= 56th General Assembly of Prince Edward Island =

The 56th General Assembly of Prince Edward Island was in session from March 18, 1983, to March 25, 1986. The Progressive Conservative Party led by James Lee formed the government.

Marion Reid was elected speaker, the first woman chosen to perform that function in the province's assembly.

There were four sessions of the 56th General Assembly:

Session	Start	End
1st	March 18, 1983	June 23, 1983
2nd	March 6, 1984	May 11, 1984
3rd	February 7, 1985	May 28, 1985
4th	March 24, 1986	March 24, 1986

== Members ==
=== Kings ===
District	Assemblyman	Party	First elected / previously elected
1st Kings	Ross "Johnny" Young	Liberal	1978
2nd Kings	Roddy Pratt	Progressive; Conservative	1978
3rd Kings	A. A. "Joey" Fraser	Progressive; Conservative	1981
4th Kings	Pat Binns	Progressive; Conservative	1978
4th Kings	Stanley Bruce (1984)	Liberal	1984
5th Kings	Arthur J. MacDonald	Liberal	1962, 1970
District	Councillor	Party	First elected / previously elected
1st Kings	Albert Fogarty	Progressive; Conservative	1979
2nd Kings	Francis O'Brien	Progressive; Conservative	1982
3rd Kings	Peter MacLeod	Progressive; Conservative	1982
4th Kings	Gilbert R. Clements	Liberal	1970, 1979
5th Kings	Lowell Johnston	Progressive; Conservative	1978

=== Prince ===
District	Assemblyman	Party	First elected / previously elected
1st Prince	Robert Morrissey	Liberal	1982
2nd Prince	Keith Milligan	Liberal	1981
3rd Prince	Léonce Bernard	Liberal	1975
4th Prince	William MacDougall	Progressive; Conservative	1978
4th Prince	Stavert Huestis (1984)	Liberal	1984
5th Prince	George McMahon	Progressive; Conservative	1976
District	Councillor	Party	First elected / previously elected
1st Prince	Robert E. Campbell	Liberal	1962
2nd Prince	Allison Ellis	Liberal	1978
3rd Prince	Edward Clark	Liberal	1970
4th Prince	Prowse Chappel	Progressive; Conservative	1978
5th Prince	Peter Pope	Progressive; Conservative	1979
5th Prince	Peter Pope	Independent	1979
5th Prince	Peter Pope	Progressive; Conservative	1979

=== Queens ===
District	Assemblyman	Party	First elected / previously elected
1st Queens	Marion Reid	Progressive; Conservative	1979
2nd Queens	Gordon Lank	Progressive; Conservative	1979
3rd Queens	Horace B. Carver	Progressive; Conservative	1978
4th Queens	Wilbur MacDonald	Progressive; Conservative	1982
5th Queens	James M. Lee	Progressive; Conservative	1975
6th Queens	Joseph Atallah Ghiz	Liberal	1982
District	Councillor	Party	First elected / previously elected
1st Queens	Leone Bagnall	Progressive; Conservative	1979
2nd Queens	Lloyd MacPhail	Progressive; Conservative	1961
2nd Queens	Ron MacKinley (1985)	Liberal	1985
3rd Queens	Fred Driscoll	Progressive; Conservative	1978
4th Queens	Daniel Compton	Progressive; Conservative	1970
5th Queens	Wilfred MacDonald	Progressive; Conservative	1979
6th Queens	Paul Connolly	Liberal	1982
