= 55th General Assembly of Prince Edward Island =

The 55th General Assembly of Prince Edward Island was in session from June 29, 1979, to August 31, 1982. The Progressive Conservative Party led by Angus MacLean formed the government. When MacLean retired from politics in 1981, James Lee became premier and party leader.

Daniel Compton was elected speaker.

There were four sessions of the 55th General Assembly:

Session	Start	End
1st	June 29, 1979	August 1, 1979
2nd	February 7, 1980	April 12, 1980
3rd	February 19, 1981	April 24, 1981
4th	March 4, 1982	May 7, 1982

== Members ==
=== Kings ===
District	Assemblyman	Party	First elected / previously elected
1st Kings	Ross "Johnny" Young	Liberal	1978
2nd Kings	Roddy Pratt	Progressive; Conservative	1978
3rd Kings	William Bennett Campbell	Liberal	1970
3rd Kings	A. A. "Joey" Fraser (1981)	Progressive; Conservative	1981
4th Kings	Pat Binns	Progressive; Conservative	1978
5th Kings	Arthur J. MacDonald	Liberal	1962, 1970
District	Councillor	Party	First elected / previously elected
1st Kings	Albert Fogarty	Progressive; Conservative	1979
2nd Kings	Leo Rossiter	Progressive; Conservative	1955
3rd Kings	Bud Ings	Liberal	1970
4th Kings	Gilbert R. Clements	Liberal	1970, 1979
5th Kings	Lowell Johnston	Progressive; Conservative	1978

=== Prince ===
District	Assemblyman	Party	First elected / previously elected
1st Prince	Russell Perry	Liberal	1970
2nd Prince	George R. Henderson	Liberal	1974
2nd Prince	Keith Milligan (1981)	Liberal	1981
3rd Prince	Léonce Bernard	Liberal	1975
4th Prince	William MacDougall	Progressive; Conservative	1978
5th Prince	George McMahon	Progressive; Conservative	1976
District	Councillor	Party	First elected / previously elected
1st Prince	Robert E. Campbell	Liberal	1962
2nd Prince	Allison Ellis	Liberal	1978
3rd Prince	Edward Clark	Liberal	1970
4th Prince	Prowse Chappel	Progressive; Conservative	1978
5th Prince	Peter Pope	Progressive; Conservative	1979

=== Queens ===
District	Assemblyman	Party	First elected / previously elected
1st Queens	Marion Reid	Progressive; Conservative	1979
2nd Queens	Gordon Lank	Progressive; Conservative	1979
3rd Queens	Horace B. Carver	Progressive; Conservative	1978
4th Queens	J. Angus MacLean	Progressive; Conservative	1976
5th Queens	James M. Lee	Progressive; Conservative	1975
6th Queens	Barry Clark	Progressive; Conservative	1978
District	Councillor	Party	First elected / previously elected
1st Queens	Leone Bagnall	Progressive; Conservative	1979
2nd Queens	Lloyd MacPhail	Progressive; Conservative	1961
3rd Queens	Fred Driscoll	Progressive; Conservative	1978
4th Queens	Daniel Compton	Progressive; Conservative	1970
5th Queens	Wilfred MacDonald	Progressive; Conservative	1979
6th Queens	Jim Larkin	Progressive; Conservative	1979
