= 1979 Prince Edward Island general election =

Canadian provincial election

← 1978	April 23, 1979	1982 →

All 32 seats in the Legislative Assembly of Prince Edward Island 17 seats needed for a majority
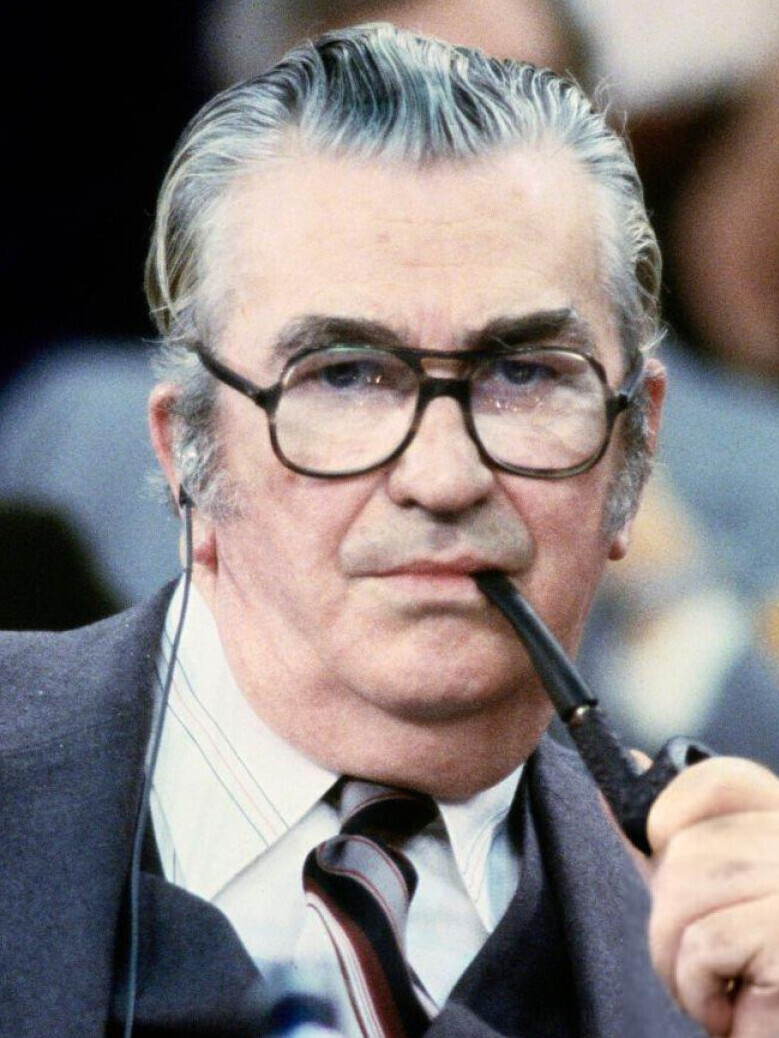
	First party	Second party
		Lib
Leader	Angus MacLean	Bennett Campbell
Party	Progressive Conservative	Liberal
Leader since	September 25, 1976	December 9, 1978
Leader's seat	4th Queens	3rd Kings
Last election	15 seats, 48.1%	17 seats, 50.7%
Seats won	21	11
Seat change	▲6	▼6
Popular vote	68,440	58,175
Percentage	53.3%	45.3%
Swing	▲5.2pp	▼5.4pp
- Seats won by each party per district. Voters elect two members (one Councillor and Assemblyman) from each of the 16 districts.
Premier before election
Bennett Campbell
Liberal
Premier after election
Angus MacLean
Progressive Conservative

The 1979 Prince Edward Island general election was held on April 23, 1979.

The election was held just one year after the 1978 election, which featured a 17–15 split in MLAs in the legislature. Following the resignation of former premier Alex Campbell from his seat, the legislature was in a 15–15 tie in voting members (the Liberal Speaker, Russell Perry, could not cast active votes in his role), the new Premier Bennett Campbell decided to call an election in an effort to regain his lost majority. The gambit failed, and instead the Progressive Conservatives led by Angus MacLean formed a strong majority government.

The campaign was the first to feature a female party leader running in PEI, with Doreen Sark serving as interim leader of the NDP. The campaign was also the only one in which the "Draft Beer Party of PEI" ran, with one candidate in 5th Queens.

== Party standings ==
↓
21	11
PC	Liberal

Party	Party Leader	Seats			Popular Vote		
Party	Party Leader	1978	Elected	Change	#	%	Change
Progressive Conservative	Angus MacLean	15	21	+6	68,440	53.3%	+5.2%
Liberal	Bennett Campbell	17	11	-6	58,174	45.3%	-5.4%
New Democratic	Doreen Sark (interim)	0	0	-	1,655	1.3%	+0.4%
Draft Beer Party	-	-	0	-	200	0.2%	+0.2%

Popular vote
PC	53.27%
Liberal	45.28%
New Democratic	1.29%
Others	0.16%

Seats summary
PC	65.63%
Liberal	34.37%

== Members elected ==
The Legislature of Prince Edward Island had two levels of membership from 1893 to 1996 - Assemblymen and Councillors. This was a holdover from when the Island had a bicameral legislature, the General Assembly and the Legislative Council.

In 1893, the Legislative Council was abolished and had its membership merged with the Assembly, though the two titles remained separate and were elected by different electoral franchises. Assembleymen were elected by all eligible voters of within a district. Before 1963, Councillors were only elected by landowners within a district, but afterward they were elected in the same manner as Assemblymen.

=== Kings ===
District	Assemblyman	Party	Councillor	Party
1st Kings	Ross "Johnny" Young	Liberal	Albert Fogarty	Progressive; Conservative
2nd Kings	Roddy Pratt	Progressive; Conservative	Leo Rossiter	Progressive; Conservative
3rd Kings	William Bennett Campbell	Liberal	Bud Ings	Liberal
4th Kings	Pat Binns	Progressive; Conservative	Gilbert R. Clements	Liberal
5th Kings	Arthur J. MacDonald	Liberal	Lowell Johnston	Progressive; Conservative

=== Prince ===
District	Assemblyman	Party	Councillor	Party
1st Prince	Russell Perry	Liberal	Robert E. Campbell	Liberal
2nd Prince	George R. Henderson	Liberal	Allison Ellis	Liberal
3rd Prince	Léonce Bernard	Liberal	Edward Clark	Liberal
4th Prince	William MacDougall	Progressive; Conservative	Prowse Chappel	Progressive; Conservative
5th Prince	George McMahon	Progressive; Conservative	Peter Pope	Progressive; Conservative

=== Queens ===
District	Assemblyman	Party	Councillor	Party
1st Queens	Marion Reid	Progressive; Conservative	Leone Bagnall	Progressive; Conservative
2nd Queens	Gordon Lank	Progressive; Conservative	Lloyd MacPhail	Progressive; Conservative
3rd Queens	Horace B. Carver	Progressive; Conservative	Fred Driscoll	Progressive; Conservative
4th Queens	J. Angus MacLean	Progressive; Conservative	Daniel Compton	Progressive; Conservative
5th Queens	James M. Lee	Progressive; Conservative	Wilfred MacDonald	Progressive; Conservative
6th Queens	Barry Clark	Progressive; Conservative	Jim Larkin	Progressive; Conservative
