= 54th General Assembly of Prince Edward Island =

The 54th General Assembly of Prince Edward Island was in session from June 6, 1978, to March 27, 1979. The Liberal Party led by Alex Campbell formed the government. Bennett Campbell became party leader and Premier in September 1978.

Russell Perry was elected speaker.

There was one session of the 54th General Assembly:

Session	Start	End
1st	June 6, 1978	July 12, 1978

== Members ==
=== Kings ===
District	Assemblyman	Party	First elected / previously elected
1st Kings	Ross "Johnny" Young	Liberal	1978
2nd Kings	Roddy Pratt	Progressive; Conservative	1978
3rd Kings	William Bennett Campbell	Liberal	1970
4th Kings	Pat Binns	Progressive; Conservative	1978
5th Kings	Arthur J. MacDonald	Liberal	1962, 1970
District	Councillor	Party	First elected / previously elected
1st Kings	James Fay	Liberal	1976
2nd Kings	Leo Rossiter	Progressive; Conservative	1955
3rd Kings	Bud Ings	Liberal	1970
4th Kings	Johnnie Williams	Progressive; Conservative	1978
5th Kings	Lowell Johnston	Progressive; Conservative	1978

=== Prince ===
District	Assemblyman	Party	First elected / previously elected
1st Prince	Russell Perry	Liberal	1970
2nd Prince	George R. Henderson	Liberal	1974
3rd Prince	Léonce Bernard	Liberal	1975
4th Prince	William MacDougall	Progressive; Conservative	1978
5th Prince	George McMahon	Progressive; Conservative	1976
District	Councillor	Party	First elected / previously elected
1st Prince	Robert E. Campbell	Liberal	1962
2nd Prince	Allison Ellis	Liberal	1978
3rd Prince	Edward Clark	Liberal	1970
4th Prince	Prowse Chappel	Progressive; Conservative	1978
5th Prince	Alexander B. Campbell	Liberal	1965

=== Queens ===
District	Assemblyman	Party	First elected / previously elected
1st Queens	Jean Canfield	Liberal	1970
2nd Queens	David Ford	Liberal	1974
3rd Queens	Horace B. Carver	Progressive; Conservative	1978
4th Queens	J. Angus MacLean	Progressive; Conservative	1976
5th Queens	James M. Lee	Progressive; Conservative	1975
6th Queens	Barry Clark	Progressive; Conservative	1978
District	Councillor	Party	First elected / previously elected
1st Queens	Ralph Johnstone	Liberal	1970
2nd Queens	Lloyd MacPhail	Progressive; Conservative	1961
3rd Queens	Fred Driscoll	Progressive; Conservative	1978
4th Queens	Daniel Compton	Progressive; Conservative	1970
5th Queens	George Proud	Liberal	1974
6th Queens	John H. Maloney	Liberal	1970
