= 1982 Prince Edward Island general election =

Canadian provincial election

← 1979	September 27, 1982	1986 →

All 32 seats in the Legislative Assembly of Prince Edward Island 17 seats needed for a majority
- Turnout: 78.2%
	First party	Second party
	PC
Leader	James Lee	Joe Ghiz
Party	Progressive Conservative	Liberal
Leader since	November 7, 1981	October 24, 1981
Leader's seat	5th Queens	6th Queens
Last election	21 seats, 53.3%	11 seats, 45.3%
Seats won	21	11
Seat change	Steady	Steady
Popular vote	71,274	60,771
Percentage	53.7%	45.8%
Swing	▲0.4pp	▲0.5pp
- Seats won by each party per district. Voters elect two members (one Councillor and Assemblyman) from each of the 16 districts.
Premier before election
James Lee
Progressive Conservative
Premier after election
James Lee
Progressive Conservative

The 1982 Prince Edward Island general election was held on September 27, 1982.

In 1981, after just two years as premier, Angus MacLean resigned his position after the election of James Lee to the Progressive Conservative leadership. In the same year, the Liberals selected future premier Joe Ghiz as their leader. Lee called an early election (traditionally elections in PEI are held every four years) in which a few seats changed hands, but the overall count stayed the same as in 1979.

This election also marked the lowest point in popular support for the New Democrats on PEI, who were led by an interim leader.

== Party standings ==
↓
21	11
PC	Liberal

Party	Party Leader	Seats			Popular Vote		
Party	Party Leader	1979	Elected	Change	#	%	Change
Progressive Conservative	James Lee	21	21	-	71,274	53.7%	+0.4%
Liberal	Joe Ghiz	11	11	-	60,771	45.8%	+0.5%
New Democratic	David Burke (interim)	0	0	-	629	0.5%	-0.8%

Popular vote
PC	53.72%
Liberal	45.80%
New Democratic	0.47%

Seats summary
PC	65.63%
Liberal	34.37%

== Members elected ==
The Legislature of Prince Edward Island had two levels of membership from 1893 to 1996 - Assemblymen and Councillors. This was a holdover from when the Island had a bicameral legislature, the General Assembly and the Legislative Council.

In 1893, the Legislative Council was abolished and had its membership merged with the Assembly, though the two titles remained separate and were elected by different electoral franchises. Assembleymen were elected by all eligible voters of within a district. Before 1963, Councillors were only elected by landowners within a district, but afterward they were elected in the same manner as Assemblymen.

=== Kings ===
District	Assemblyman	Party	Councillor	Party
1st Kings	Ross "Johnny" Young	Liberal	Albert Fogarty	Progressive; Conservative
2nd Kings	Roddy Pratt	Progressive; Conservative	Francis O'Brien	Progressive; Conservative
3rd Kings	A. A. "Joey" Fraser	Progressive; Conservative	Peter MacLeod	Progressive; Conservative
4th Kings	Pat Binns	Progressive; Conservative	Gilbert R. Clements	Liberal
5th Kings	Arthur J. MacDonald	Liberal	Lowell Johnston	Progressive; Conservative

=== Prince ===
District	Assemblyman	Party	Councillor	Party
1st Prince	Robert Morrissey	Liberal	Robert E. Campbell	Liberal
2nd Prince	Keith Milligan	Liberal	Allison Ellis	Liberal
3rd Prince	Léonce Bernard	Liberal	Edward Clark	Liberal
4th Prince	William MacDougall	Progressive; Conservative	Prowse Chappel	Progressive; Conservative
5th Prince	George McMahon	Progressive; Conservative	Peter Pope	Progressive; Conservative

=== Queens ===
District	Assemblyman	Party	Councillor	Party
1st Queens	Marion Reid	Progressive; Conservative	Leone Bagnall	Progressive; Conservative
2nd Queens	Gordon Lank	Progressive; Conservative	Lloyd MacPhail	Progressive; Conservative
3rd Queens	Horace B. Carver	Progressive; Conservative	Fred Driscoll	Progressive; Conservative
4th Queens	Wilbur MacDonald	Progressive; Conservative	Daniel Compton	Progressive; Conservative
5th Queens	James M. Lee	Progressive; Conservative	Wilfred MacDonald	Progressive; Conservative
6th Queens	Joseph Atallah Ghiz	Liberal	Paul Connolly	Liberal
