= 1986 Prince Edward Island general election =

Canadian provincial election

← 1982	April 21, 1986	1989 →

All 32 seats in the Legislative Assembly of Prince Edward Island 17 seats needed for a majority
- Turnout: 87.60%
	First party	Second party
		PC
Leader	Joe Ghiz	James Lee
Party	Liberal	Progressive Conservative
Leader since	October 24, 1981	November 7, 1981
Leader's seat	6th Queens	5th Queens (lost)
Last election	11 seats, 45.8%	21 seats, 53.7%
Seats won	21	11
Seat change	▲10	▼10
Popular vote	75,187	68,062
Percentage	50.3%	45.5%
Swing	▲4.5pp	▼8.2pp
- Seats won by each party per district. Voters elect two members (one Councillor and Assemblyman) from each of the 16 districts.
Premier before election
James Lee
Progressive Conservative
Premier after election
Joe Ghiz
Liberal

The 1986 Prince Edward Island general election was held on April 21, 1986.

The election resulted in the defeat of the two-term Progressive Conservative government by the Liberals led by Joe Ghiz. Ghiz, the son of a Lebanese store owner, went on to become the first Canadian premier that was not of complete European descent.

== Party standings ==
↓
21	11
Liberal	PC

Party	Party Leader	Seats			Popular Vote		
Party	Party Leader	1982	Elected	Change	#	%	Change
Liberal	Joe Ghiz	11	21	+10	75,187	50.3%	+4.5%
Progressive Conservative	James Lee	21	11	-10	68,062	45.5%	-8.2%
New Democratic	Jim Mayne	0	0	-	5,965	4.0%	+3.5%
Independent		-	0	-	280	0.2%	+0.2%

Popular vote
Liberal	50.29%
PC	45.53%
New Democratic	3.99%
Others	0.19%

Seats summary
Liberal	65.63%
PC	34.37%

== Members elected ==
The Legislature of Prince Edward Island had two levels of membership from 1893 to 1996 - Assemblymen and Councillors. This was a holdover from when the Island had a bicameral legislature, the General Assembly and the Legislative Council.

In 1893, the Legislative Council was abolished and had its membership merged with the Assembly, though the two titles remained separate and were elected by different electoral franchises. Assembleymen were elected by all eligible voters of within a district. Before 1963, Councillors were only elected by landowners within a district, but afterward they were elected in the same manner as Assemblymen.

=== Kings ===
District	Assemblyman	Party	Councillor	Party
1st Kings	Ross "Johnny" Young	Liberal	Albert Fogarty	Progressive; Conservative
2nd Kings	Roddy Pratt	Progressive; Conservative	Francis O'Brien	Progressive; Conservative
3rd Kings	A. A. "Joey" Fraser	Progressive; Conservative	Peter MacLeod	Progressive; Conservative
4th Kings	Stanley Bruce	Liberal	Gilbert R. Clements	Liberal
5th Kings	Arthur J. MacDonald	Liberal	Barry Hicken	Liberal

=== Prince ===
District	Assemblyman	Party	Councillor	Party
1st Prince	Robert Morrissey	Liberal	Robert E. Campbell	Liberal
2nd Prince	Keith Milligan	Liberal	Allison Ellis	Liberal
3rd Prince	Léonce Bernard	Liberal	Edward Clark	Liberal
4th Prince	Stavert Huestis	Liberal	Prowse Chappel	Progressive; Conservative
5th Prince	George McMahon	Progressive; Conservative	Peter Pope	Progressive; Conservative

=== Queens ===
District	Assemblyman	Party	Councillor	Party
1st Queens	Marion Reid	Progressive; Conservative	Leone Bagnall	Progressive; Conservative
2nd Queens	Gordon MacInnis	Liberal	Ron MacKinley	Liberal
3rd Queens	Betty Jean Brown	Liberal	Tom Dunphy	Liberal
4th Queens	Wilbur MacDonald	Progressive; Conservative	Lynwood MacPherson	Liberal
5th Queens	Wayne Cheverie	Liberal	Tim Carroll	Liberal
6th Queens	Joseph Atallah Ghiz	Liberal	Paul Connolly	Liberal
