= 52nd General Assembly of Prince Edward Island =

The 52nd General Assembly of Prince Edward Island was in session from June 2, 1970, to April 3, 1974. The Liberal Party led by Alex Campbell formed the government.

Cecil A. Miller was elected speaker.

There were five sessions of the 52nd General Assembly:

Session	Start	End
1st	June 2, 1970	June 25, 1970
2nd	February 18, 1971	November 26, 1971
3rd	March 2, 1972	April 14, 1972
4th	January 23, 1973	March 16, 1973
5th	March 7, 1974	April 3, 1974

== Members ==
=== Kings ===
District	Assemblyman	Party	First elected / previously elected
1st Kings	Bruce L. Stewart	Liberal	1966
2nd Kings	Walter Dingwell	Progressive; Conservative	1959
3rd Kings	William Bennett Campbell	Liberal	1970
4th Kings	Lorne Bonnell	Liberal	1951
4th Kings	John Bonnell (1972)	Liberal	1972
5th Kings	Arthur J. MacDonald	Liberal	1962, 1970
District	Councillor	Party	First elected / previously elected
1st Kings	Daniel J. MacDonald	Liberal	1962
1st Kings	Melvin J. McQuaid (1972)	Progressive; Conservative	1959, 1972
2nd Kings	Leo Rossiter	Progressive; Conservative	1955
3rd Kings	Bud Ings	Liberal	1970
4th Kings	Gilbert R. Clements	Liberal	1970
5th Kings	George J. Ferguson	Liberal	1961

=== Prince ===
District	Assemblyman	Party	First elected / previously elected
1st Prince	Russell Perry	Liberal	1970
2nd Prince	George Dewar	Progressive; Conservative	1955
3rd Prince	William Gallant	Liberal	1970
4th Prince	Robert Schurman	Liberal	1970
5th Prince	Earle Hickey	Liberal	1966
District	Councillor	Party	First elected / previously elected
1st Prince	Robert E. Campbell	Liberal	1962
2nd Prince	Joshua MacArthur	Liberal	1970
3rd Prince	Edward Clark	Liberal	1970
4th Prince	Frank Jardine	Liberal	1962
5th Prince	Alexander B. Campbell	Liberal	1965

=== Queens ===
District	Assemblyman	Party	First elected / previously elected
1st Queens	Jean Canfield	Liberal	1970
2nd Queens	Sinclair Cutcliffe	Liberal	1966
2nd Queens	Bennett Carr (1972)	Liberal	1972
3rd Queens	Cecil A. Miller	Liberal	1966
4th Queens	J. Stewart Ross	Liberal	1959
5th Queens	Gordon L. Bennett	Liberal	1966
6th Queens	Allison MacDonald	Liberal	1970
District	Councillor	Party	First elected / previously elected
1st Queens	Ralph Johnstone	Liberal	1970
2nd Queens	Lloyd MacPhail	Progressive; Conservative	1961
3rd Queens	Levi McNally	Liberal	1970
4th Queens	Daniel Compton	Progressive; Conservative	1970
5th Queens	Elmer Blanchard	Liberal	1966
5th Queens	Peter McNeil (1970)	Liberal	1970
6th Queens	John H. Maloney	Liberal	1970
