= 51st General Assembly of Prince Edward Island =

The 51st General Assembly of Prince Edward Island was in session from November 23, 1966, to March 26, 1970. The Liberal Party led by Alex Campbell formed the government.

Prosper Arsenault was elected speaker.

There were five sessions of the 51st General Assembly:

Session	Start	End
1st	November 23, 1966	November 24, 1966
2nd	March 14, 1967	May 19, 1967
3rd	February 22, 1968	April 25, 1968
4th	March 11, 1969	June 6, 1969
5th	February 26, 1970	March 26, 1970

== Members ==
=== Kings ===
District	Assemblyman	Party	First elected / previously elected
1st Kings	Bruce L. Stewart	Liberal	1966
2nd Kings	Walter Dingwell	Progressive; Conservative	1959
3rd Kings	Thomas A. Curran	Progressive; Conservative	1959
4th Kings	Lorne Bonnell	Liberal	1951
5th Kings	Cyril Sinnott	Progressive; Conservative	1966
District	Councillor	Party	First elected / previously elected
1st Kings	Daniel J. MacDonald	Liberal	1962
2nd Kings	Leo Rossiter	Progressive; Conservative	1955
3rd Kings	Preston MacLure	Progressive; Conservative	1966
4th Kings	Keir Clark	Liberal	1947, (Note: 3rd Kings (Councillor)) 1966
4th Kings	Keir Clark	Independent Liberal	1947, 1966
5th Kings	George J. Ferguson	Liberal	1961

=== Prince ===
District	Assemblyman	Party	First elected / previously elected
1st Prince	Prosper Arsenault	Liberal	1955, 1962
2nd Prince	George Dewar	Progressive; Conservative	1955
3rd Prince	Henry Wedge	Progressive; Conservative	1959
4th Prince	Max Thompson	Liberal	1966
5th Prince	Earle Hickey	Liberal	1966
District	Councillor	Party	First elected / previously elected
1st Prince	Robert E. Campbell	Liberal	1962
2nd Prince	Robert Grindlay	Progressive; Conservative	1959
3rd Prince	Keith Harrington	Progressive; Conservative	1959
4th Prince	Frank Jardine	Liberal	1962
5th Prince	Alexander B. Campbell	Liberal	1965

=== Queens ===
District	Assemblyman	Party	First elected / previously elected
1st Queens	Frank Myers	Progressive; Conservative	1951, 1957
2nd Queens	Sinclair Cutcliffe	Liberal	1966
3rd Queens	Cecil A. Miller	Liberal	1966
4th Queens	J. Stewart Ross	Liberal	1959
5th Queens	Gordon L. Bennett	Liberal	1966
6th Queens	J. David Stewart	Progressive; Conservative	1959
District	Councillor	Party	First elected / previously elected
1st Queens	Walter Russell Shaw	Progressive; Conservative	1959
2nd Queens	Lloyd MacPhail	Progressive; Conservative	1961
3rd Queens	J. Russell Driscoll	Progressive; Conservative	1959
4th Queens	Harold P. Smith	Liberal	1953
5th Queens	Elmer Blanchard	Liberal	1966
6th Queens	Alban Farmer	Progressive; Conservative	1959
