= 1966 Prince Edward Island general election =

Canadian provincial election

- May 30, 1966 (11 July 1966)

All 32 seats in the Legislative Assembly of Prince Edward Island 17 seats needed for a majority
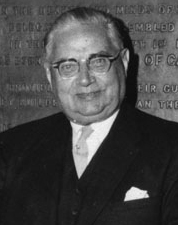
	First party	Second party
	Lib
Leader	Alex Campbell	Walter R. Shaw
Party	Liberal	Progressive Conservative
Leader since	December 11, 1965	September 17, 1957
Leader's seat	5th Prince	1st Queens
Last election	11 seats, 49.4%	19 seats, 50.6%
Seats won	17	15
Seat change	▲6	▼4
Popular vote	47,065	46,118
Percentage	50.5%	49.5%
Swing	▲1.1pp	▼1.1pp
- Seats won by each party per district. Voters elect two members (one Councillor and Assemblyman) from each of the 16 districts.
Premier before election
Walter R. Shaw
Progressive Conservative
Premier after election
Alex Campbell
Liberal

The 1966 Prince Edward Island general election was held on May 30, 1966.

The election in the riding of 1st Kings was delayed until July 11, 1966 due to the death of Liberal Assemblyman and candidate William Acorn. As it turned out, other ridings elected a total of 15 Liberals and 15 Progressive Conservatives, and the riding of 1st Kings would by itself decide the general election.

The Progressive Conservative government of 1958-1962 had attempted to ensure its re-election by rejigging the electoral map in the Queen's County and also working to win 1st Kings by unusual methods such as naming one of the PC candidates (Keith Mackenzie) as Minister of Transports, and paving 45 kilometres of road in the district. At the time, a reporter from the Charlottetown Guardian commented on how "the riding may well sink under the weight of the [paving] machines". The strategy failed as both Liberal candidates in 1st Kings ultimately won.

The Progressive Conservative government also split the 5th Queens district into two districts. The government broke with the tradition of each county having five ridings and ten members. By splitting 5th Queens, it gave the city of Charlottetown two ridings and therefore four members and gave Queen's County a sixth district and 12 members. This was the single biggest change to the map since 1893 when the ridings were devised. In that time population shifts had made some changes needed, as Charlottetown's population was more than five times that of some of the more rural ridings. The Progressive Conservatives had hoped that traditionally Progressive Conservative Charlottetown would vote in two additional Progressive Conservative members to the legislature; on election day the new riding elected two Progressive Conservatives, but the now modified old riding (Fifth Queen's) elected two Liberals.

The government's twin defeats in 1st Kings and 5th Queen's gave the Liberals a 17 to 15 majority and enabled Liberal leader Alex Campbell to become Premier.

== Party Standings ==
↓
17	15
Liberal	PC

Party	Party Leader	Seats			Popular Vote		
Party	Party Leader	1962	Elected	Change	#	%	Change
Liberal	Alex Campbell	11	17	+6	47,065	50.5%	+1.1%
Progressive Conservative	Walter R. Shaw	19	15	-4	46,118	49.5%	-1.1%

Popular vote
Liberal	50.51%
PC	49.49%

Seats summary
Liberal	53.13%
PC	46.87%

== Electoral reform ==
The Legislature of Prince Edward Island had two levels of membership from 1893 to 1996 - Assemblymen and Councillors. This was a holdover from when the Island had a bicameral legislature, the General Assembly and the Legislative Council.

In 1893, the Legislative Council was abolished and had its membership merged with the Assembly, though the two titles remained separate and were elected by different electoral franchises. Assembleymen were elected by eligible voters within a district. Up until past the 1962 election, Councillors were only elected by landowners within a district.

The Shaw government passed an Act in 1963, eliminating this requirement.

Henceforth, until multi-member seats were abolished (1996), the Assemblyman and the Councillor in each district would be elected by universal adult suffrage identically. But each seat would be filled in separate contest, through First past the post. The separate contests were held that way despite the fact that the members would sit in the same chamber. They ensured that in each contest a party would run just one candidate so no candidate had to run against others of the same party as would have happened in a one-ballot, multi-member district. It also allowed one contest to be between Catholics of various parties and the other contest to be between Protestants of various parties.

As well the ability of a voter to cast multiple votes in a contest was discontinued. Henceforth the rule would be "one man, one vote" or actually "one man, two votes".

== Members Elected ==
=== Kings ===
District	Assemblyman	Party	Councillor	Party
1st Kings	Bruce L. Stewart	Liberal	Daniel J. MacDonald	Liberal
2nd Kings	Walter Dingwell	Progressive; Conservative	Leo Rossiter	Progressive; Conservative
3rd Kings	Thomas A. Curran	Progressive; Conservative	Preston MacLure	Progressive; Conservative
4th Kings	Lorne Bonnell	Liberal	Keir Clark	Liberal
5th Kings	Cyril Sinnott	Progressive; Conservative	George J. Ferguson	Liberal

=== Prince ===
District	Assemblyman	Party	Councillor	Party
1st Prince	Prosper Arsenault	Liberal	Robert E. Campbell	Liberal
2nd Prince	George Dewar	Progressive; Conservative	Robert Grindlay	Progressive; Conservative
3rd Prince	Henry Wedge	Progressive; Conservative	Keith Harrington	Progressive; Conservative
4th Prince	Max Thompson	Liberal	Frank Jardine	Liberal
5th Prince	Earle Hickey	Liberal	Alexander B. Campbell	Liberal

=== Queens ===
District	Assemblyman	Party	Councillor	Party
1st Queens	Frank Myers	Progressive; Conservative	Walter Russell Shaw	Progressive; Conservative
2nd Queens	Sinclair Cutcliffe	Liberal	Lloyd MacPhail	Progressive; Conservative
3rd Queens	Cecil A. Miller	Liberal	J. Russell Driscoll	Progressive; Conservative
4th Queens	J. Stewart Ross	Liberal	Harold P. Smith	Liberal
5th Queens	Gordon L. Bennett	Liberal	Elmer Blanchard	Liberal
6th Queens	J. David Stewart	Progressive; Conservative	Alban Farmer	Progressive; Conservative
