= 1989 Prince Edward Island general election =

Canadian provincial election

- May 29, 1989

All 32 seats in the Legislative Assembly of Prince Edward Island 17 seats needed for a majority
| | First party | Second party |
|---|---|---|
| | | PC |
| Leader | Joe Ghiz | Mel Gass |
| Party | Liberal | Progressive Conservative |
| Leader since | October 24, 1981 | June 11, 1988 |
| Leader's seat | 6th Queens | Ran in 2nd Queens (lost) |
| Last election | 21 seats, 50.3% | 11 seats, 45.5% |
| Seats won | 30 | 2 |
| Seat change | ▲9 | ▼9 |
| Popular vote | 85,982 | 50,731 |
| Percentage | 60.7% | 35.8% |
| Swing | ▲10.4pp | ▼9.7pp |
- Seats won by each party per district. Voters elect two members (one Councillor and Assemblyman) from each of the 16 districts.
Premier before election
Joe Ghiz
Liberal
Premier after election
Joe Ghiz
Liberal

The 1989 Prince Edward Island general election was held on May 29, 1989.

The campaign resulted in the re-election of the Liberal government of Premier Joe Ghiz. In this election, the Liberals won 60.7% of the popular vote, the highest percentage that a winning party has taken on record in Prince Edward Island. The Progressive Conservatives won two seats despite taking 36 per cent of the popular vote; they were due 12 seats. This was the lowest share of the vote that the Progressive Conservatives ever received, 35.8%. Only 5 times has the Opposition had two or fewer seats in the history of Prince Edward Island; this was one of them.

One of the two members from each constituency is styled a Councillor, and the other an Assemblyman. In electoral contests Councillor candidates run against Councillor candidates; Assemblyman candidates against Assemblyman candidates.

== Opinion polls ==
Evolution of voting intentions at provincial level
| Polling firm | Last day of survey | Source | PEILA | PCPEI | NDPPEI | ME | Sample |
|---|---|---|---|---|---|---|---|
| Election 1989 | May 29, 1989 | | 60.7 | 35.8 | 3.5 | | |
| Baseline Research | May 10, 1989 | | 68 | 26 | 6 | 6−7 | 200 |
| Election 1986 | April 21, 1986 | | 50.3 | 45.5 | 4.0 | | |

== Party standings ==
↓
| 30 | 2 |
| Liberal | PC |

| Party | Party Leader | Seats | | | Popular Vote | | |
| Party | Party Leader | 1986 | Elected | Change | # | % | Change |
|---|---|---|---|---|---|---|---|
| Liberal | Joe Ghiz | 21 | 30 | +9 | 85,982 | 60.7% | +10.4% |
| Progressive Conservative | Mel Gass | 11 | 2 | -9 | 50,731 | 35.8% | -9.7% |
| New Democratic | Jim Mayne | 0 | 0 | - | 4,902 | 3.5% | -0.5% |

Popular vote
| Liberal | 60.72% |
| PC | 35.82% |
| New Democratic | 3.46% |

Seats summary
| Liberal | 93.75% |
| PC | 6.25% |

== Members elected ==
The Legislature of Prince Edward Island had two levels of membership from 1893 to 1996 - Assemblymen and Councillors. This was a holdover from when the Island had a bicameral legislature, the General Assembly and the Legislative Council.

In 1893, the Legislative Council was abolished and had its membership merged with the Assembly, though the two titles remained separate and were elected by different electoral franchises. Assembleymen were elected by all eligible voters of within a district. Before 1963, Councillors were only elected by landowners within a district, but afterward they were elected in the same manner as Assemblymen.

=== Kings ===
| District | Assemblyman | Party | Councillor | Party |
|---|---|---|---|---|
| 1st Kings | Ross "Johnny" Young | Liberal | Albert Fogarty | Progressive; Conservative |
| 2nd Kings | Claude Matheson | Liberal | Walter Bradley | Liberal |
| 3rd Kings | Peter Doucette | Liberal | Roberta Hubley | Liberal |
| 4th Kings | Stanley Bruce | Liberal | Gilbert R. Clements | Liberal |
| 5th Kings | Rose Marie MacDonald | Liberal | Barry Hicken | Liberal |

=== Prince ===
| District | Assemblyman | Party | Councillor | Party |
|---|---|---|---|---|
| 1st Prince | Robert Morrissey | Liberal | Robert E. Campbell | Liberal |
| 2nd Prince | Keith Milligan | Liberal | Allison Ellis | Liberal |
| 3rd Prince | Léonce Bernard | Liberal | Edward Clark | Liberal |
| 4th Prince | Stavert Huestis | Liberal | Libbe Hubley | Liberal |
| 5th Prince | Walter McEwen | Liberal | Nancy Guptill | Liberal |

=== Queens ===
| District | Assemblyman | Party | Councillor | Party |
|---|---|---|---|---|
| 1st Queens | Marion Murphy | Liberal | Leone Bagnall | Progressive; Conservative |
| 2nd Queens | Gordon MacInnis | Liberal | Ron MacKinley | Liberal |
| 3rd Queens | Betty Jean Brown | Liberal | Tom Dunphy | Liberal |
| 4th Queens | Alan Buchanan | Liberal | Lynwood MacPherson | Liberal |
| 5th Queens | Wayne Cheverie | Liberal | Tim Carroll | Liberal |
| 6th Queens | Joseph Atallah Ghiz | Liberal | Paul Connolly | Liberal |
