= Alban Farmer =

Canadian politician

Councillor for 5th Queens
- In office 1959–1966
- Preceded by: Alex MacIsaac
- Succeeded by: Elmer Blanchard

Councillor for 6th Queens
- In office 1966–1970
- Preceded by: first member
- Succeeded by: John H. Maloney

Personal details
- Born: Michael Alban Farmer; September 27, 1901 Kinkora, Prince Edward Island
- Died: December 27, 1988 (aged 87)
- Party: Progressive Conservative
- Occupation: lawyer

Michael Alban Farmer (September 27, 1901 – December 27, 1988) was a Canadian politician, who served in the Legislative Assembly of Prince Edward Island from 1959 to 1970. A member of the Prince Edward Island Progressive Conservative Party, he represented the electoral district of 5th Queens from 1959 to 1966, and 6th Queens from 1966 to 1970, and served on the Executive Council of Prince Edward Island as provincial treasurer and attorney general in the government of Walter Shaw.

Born and raised in Kinkora, Prince Edward Island, Farmer was educated at Prince of Wales College, St. Dunstan's University and Dalhousie University. Prior to his election to the provincial legislature, he worked as a lawyer and as private secretary to provincial Lieutenant Governor George de Blois, served on Charlottetown City Council from 1946 to 1952 and mounted two unsuccessful campaigns for mayor of Charlottetown.
