= Peter MacLeod =

Canadian politician

MLA (Councillor) for 3rd Kings
- In office 1982–1989
- Preceded by: Bud Ings
- Succeeded by: Roberta Hubley

Personal details
- Born: October 26, 1930 Lorne Valley, Prince Edward Island
- Died: May 29, 2001 (aged 70) Montague, Prince Edward Island
- Party: Progressive Conservative
- Spouse: Glenda

Peter B. MacLeod (October 26, 1930 – May 29, 2001) was a Canadian politician and farmer. He represented 3rd Kings in the Legislative Assembly of Prince Edward Island from 1982 to 1989 as a Progressive Conservative.

MacLeod was born in 1930 in Lorne Valley, Prince Edward Island. He married Glenda Mae MacLeod in 1953. MacLeod was a farmer by career, and also served as a school trustee.

MacLeod attempted to enter provincial politics in the 1978, and 1979 elections, but was defeated both times by Liberal Bud Ings. MacLeod ran again in the 1982 election, and was elected councillor for the electoral district of 3rd Kings. He was re-elected in 1986, but was defeated by Liberal Roberta Hubley when he ran for re-election in 1989.

MacLeod died in Montague, Prince Edward Island on May 29, 2001.
