= Willibald Joseph MacDonald =

Canadian politician

The Honourable Willibald Joseph MacDonald

19th Lieutenant Governor of Prince Edward Island
- In office August 1, 1963 – October 6, 1969
- Monarch: Elizabeth II
- Governors General: Georges Vanier; Roland Michener
- Premier: Walter R. Shaw; Alex Campbell
- Preceded by: Frederick Walter Hyndman
- Succeeded by: John George MacKay

Personal details
- Born: January 27, 1897 Souris, Prince Edward Island
- Died: March 17, 1977 (aged 80) Charlottetown, Prince Edward Island
- Spouse: Agnes Smith Flynn (m. 1922)
- Children: Inez, R.N. (Mrs. Justin Kelly), Joan, R.T., (Mrs. Dr. A. Raymond Grant), Dr. Douglas A.C. MacDonald, Stephanie, B.Sc. (Mrs. P.R. MacDonald), Dr. Louis V.A. MacDonald, William MacDonald (deceased) and G. Vernon MacDonald
- Education: Prince of Wales College; Saint Dunstan's University
- Occupation: Educator
- Profession: Politician

Willibald Joseph MacDonald (January 27, 1897 – March 17, 1977) was an educator and political figure on Prince Edward Island. He served as the 19th Lieutenant Governor of Prince Edward Island from August 1963 to October 1969.

He was born in Souris West, the son of Archibald J. MacDonald. MacDonald was educated in Souris, at Prince of Wales College and at Saint Dunstan's University, later becoming a professor at Prince of Wales College. He served overseas during World War I and also served in World War II. MacDonald married Agnes Smith Flynn in 1925.
