= Peter McNeil =

Peter McNeil may refer to:

- Peter McNeil (footballer) (1854–1901), Scottish footballer
- Peter McNeil (architect) (1917–1989), Canadian architect

== See also ==
- Peter MacNeill (active from 1973), Canadian film and television actor and voice-over artist
