= 5th Queens =

Former provincial electoral district in Prince Edward Island, Canada

Prince Edward Island electoral district
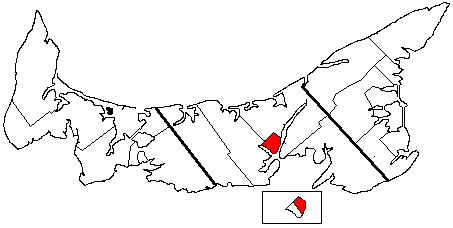
- Primary map depicts original boundaries; inset depicts boundaries after creation of 6th Queens in 1966

Defunct provincial electoral district
- Legislature: Legislative Assembly of Prince Edward Island
- District created: 1873
- District abolished: 1996
- First contested: 1873
- Last contested: 1993

Demographics
- Census division: Queens County
- Census subdivision: Charlottetown

5th Queens was a provincial electoral district of Prince Edward Island, Canada, which elected two members to the Legislative Assembly of Prince Edward Island from 1873 to 1993. The district was also known as Charlottetown Common until 1939.

Until 1966, the district comprised the entire city of Charlottetown. For that year's provincial election, the district was split, and 5th Queens comprised the eastern half of the city for the remainder of its existence. The western half of Charlottetown became the new district of 6th Queens.

The district was abolished in 1996 into Charlottetown-Kings Square, Parkdale-Belvedere, Sherwood-Hillsborough, and Stanhope-East Royalty.

== Members ==
=== Dual member ===
Assembly	Years	Member	Party	Member	Party
26th	1873	James Colledge Pope	Conservative	John Theophilus Jenkins	Conservative
26th	1873–1876	Frederick Brecken	Conservative	John Theophilus Jenkins	Conservative
27th	1876–1879	Louis Henry Davies	Liberal	George W. Deblois	Conservative
28th	1879–1882	Neil McLeod	Conservative	George W. Deblois	Conservative
29th	1882–1886	Neil McLeod	Conservative	Patrick Blake	Conservative
30th	1886–1890	Neil McLeod	Conservative	Patrick Blake	Conservative
31st	1890–1891	Neil McLeod	Conservative	Patrick Blake	Conservative
31st	1891–1893	Neil McLeod	Conservative	John Theophilus Jenkins	Conservative

=== Assemblyman-Councillor ===
Assembly	Years	Assemblyman	Party	Councillor	Party
32nd	1893–1897	Lemuel E. Prowse	Liberal	Benjamin Rogers	Liberal
33rd	1897–1900	Lemuel E. Prowse	Liberal	Benjamin Rogers	Liberal
34th	1900–1904	John Whear	Liberal	George E. Hughes	Liberal
34th	1904	James Warburton	Liberal	George E. Hughes	Liberal
35th	1904–1908	James Warburton	Liberal	George E. Hughes	Liberal
36th	1908–1912	James Warburton	Liberal	George E. Hughes	Liberal
37th	1912–1915	Stephen R. Jenkins	Conservative	William S. Stewart	Conservative
38th	1915–1919	Stephen R. Jenkins	Conservative	James Paton	Conservative
39th	1919–1923	Edmund Higgs	Liberal	Gavan Duffy	Liberal
40th	1923–1927	Chester McLure	Conservative	William J. P. MacMillan	Conservative
41st	1927–1930	Chester McLure	Conservative	William J. P. MacMillan	Conservative
41st	1930–1931	vacant		William J. P. MacMillan	Conservative
42nd	1931–1935	W. Allen Stewart	Conservative	William J. P. MacMillan	Conservative
43rd	1935–1939	T. William L. Prowse	Liberal	C. St. Clair Trainor	Liberal
44th	1939–1943	W. Allen Stewart	Conservative	William J. P. MacMillan	Conservative
45th	1943–1947	T. William L. Prowse	Liberal	William J. P. MacMillan	Conservative
46th	1947–1951	David L. Matheson	Progressive Conservative	William J. P. MacMillan	Conservative
47th	1951–1955	Earle MacDonald	Liberal	William J. P. MacMillan	Conservative
48th	1955–1959	Earle MacDonald	Liberal	Alex MacIsaac	Liberal
49th	1959–1962	J. David Stewart	Progressive Conservative	Alban Farmer	Progressive Conservative
50th	1962–1966	J. David Stewart	Progressive Conservative	Alban Farmer	Progressive Conservative
51st	1966–1970	Gordon L. Bennett	Liberal	Elmer Blanchard	Liberal
52nd	1970	Gordon L. Bennett	Liberal	Elmer Blanchard	Liberal
52nd	1970–1974	Gordon L. Bennett	Liberal	Peter McNeil	Liberal
53rd	1974	Gordon L. Bennett	Liberal	George Proud	Liberal
53rd	1974–1975	vacant		George Proud	Liberal
53rd	1975–1978	James M. Lee	Progressive Conservative	George Proud	Liberal
54th	1978–1979	James M. Lee	Progressive Conservative	George Proud	Liberal
55th	1979–1982	James M. Lee	Progressive Conservative	Wilfred MacDonald	Progressive Conservative
56th	1982–1986	James M. Lee	Progressive Conservative	Wilfred MacDonald	Progressive Conservative
57th	1986–1989	Wayne Cheverie	Liberal	Tim Carroll	Liberal
58th	1989–1993	Wayne Cheverie	Liberal	Tim Carroll	Liberal
59th	1993–1996	Wayne Cheverie	Liberal	Tim Carroll	Liberal

== Election results ==
=== 1993 ===
==== Councillor ====
1993 Prince Edward Island general election
Party	Candidate	Votes	%	±%
Liberal	Tim Carroll	4,463	48.30	-12.24
Progressive Conservative	Chester Gillan	4,199	45.44	+11.54
New Democratic	Mickey MacDonald	579	6.27	+0.70
Total valid votes		9,241	98.25	
Total rejected ballots		165	1.75	+0.45
Turnout		9,406	74.17	-2.51
Eligible voters		12,681		
Liberal hold		Swing		-12.24
Source: Elections Prince Edward Island

==== Assemblyman ====
1993 Prince Edward Island general election
Party	Candidate	Votes	%	±%
Liberal	Wayne Cheverie	5,251	56.80	-4.62
Progressive Conservative	Lloyd C. McKenna	3,387	36.64	+3.46
New Democratic	Barbara Boudreau	606	6.56	+1.16
Total valid votes		9,244	98.26	
Total rejected ballots		164	1.74	+0.71
Turnout		9,408	74.19	-2.50
Eligible voters		12,681		
Liberal hold		Swing		-4.04
Source: Elections Prince Edward Island

=== 1989 ===
==== Councillor ====
1989 Prince Edward Island general election
Party	Candidate	Votes	%	±%
Liberal	Tim Carroll	5,481	60.54	+5.34
Progressive Conservative	Jim Gaudet	3,069	33.90	-10.90
New Democratic	Kevin Roach	504	5.57	
Total valid votes		9,054	98.69	
Total rejected ballots		120	1.31	-1.09
Turnout		9,174	76.68	-8.86
Eligible voters		11,964		
Liberal hold		Swing		+8.12
Source: Elections Prince Edward Island

==== Assemblyman ====
1989 Prince Edward Island general election
Party	Candidate	Votes	%	±%
Liberal	Wayne Cheverie	5,577	61.42	+12.02
Progressive Conservative	Leon Loucks	3,013	33.18	-12.29
New Democratic	Roger Greaves	490	5.40	+0.28
Total valid votes		9,080	98.96	
Total rejected ballots		95	1.04	-0.51
Turnout		9,175	76.69	-9.34
Eligible voters		11,964		
Liberal hold		Swing		+12.16
Source: Elections Prince Edward Island

=== 1986 ===
==== Councillor ====
1986 Prince Edward Island general election
Party	Candidate	Votes	%	±%
Liberal	Tim Carroll	5,334	55.20	+13.55
Progressive Conservative	Wilfred MacDonald	4,329	44.80	-10.36
Total valid votes		9,663	97.61	
Total rejected ballots		237	2.39	+0.64
Turnout		9,900	85.54	+12.50
Eligible voters		11,574		
Liberal gain from Progressive Conservative		Swing		+11.96
Source: Elections Prince Edward Island

==== Assemblyman ====
1986 Prince Edward Island general election
Party	Candidate	Votes	%	±%
Liberal	Wayne Cheverie	4,843	49.40	+15.42
Progressive Conservative	James M. Lee	4,458	45.48	-17.60
New Democratic	Kevin Arsenault	502	5.12	+2.18
Total valid votes		9,803	98.45	
Total rejected ballots		154	1.55	-0.05
Turnout		9,957	86.03	+12.97
Eligible voters		11,574		
Liberal gain from Progressive Conservative		Swing		+16.51
Source: Elections Prince Edward Island

=== 1982 ===
==== Councillor ====
1982 Prince Edward Island general election
Party	Candidate	Votes	%	±%
Progressive Conservative	Wilfred MacDonald	4,604	55.16	+4.55
Liberal	Sibyl Cutcliffe	3,476	41.65	-3.89
New Democratic	David Burke	266	3.19	-0.66
Total valid votes		8,346	98.25	
Total rejected ballots		149	1.75	+0.09
Turnout		8,495	73.04	-3.71
Eligible voters		11,631		
Progressive Conservative hold		Swing		+4.22
Source: Elections Prince Edward Island

==== Assemblyman ====
1982 Prince Edward Island general election
Party	Candidate	Votes	%	±%
Progressive Conservative	James M. Lee	5,274	63.07	+3.02
Liberal	John Richard	2,842	33.99	-0.31
New Democratic	Maurice J. Darte	246	2.94	-0.30
Total valid votes		8,362	98.40	
Total rejected ballots		136	1.60	-0.40
Turnout		8,498	73.06	-5.48
Eligible voters		11,631		
Progressive Conservative hold		Swing		+1.66
Source: Elections Prince Edward Island

=== 1979 ===
==== Councillor ====
1979 Prince Edward Island general election
Party	Candidate	Votes	%	±%
Progressive Conservative	Wilfred MacDonald	4,106	50.62	+4.40
Liberal	George Proud	3,694	45.54	-6.68
New Democratic	Hubert Tersteeg	312	3.85	
Total valid votes		8,112	98.34	
Total rejected ballots		137	1.66	-0.40
Turnout		8,249	76.75	-6.24
Eligible voters		10,748		
Progressive Conservative gain from Liberal		Swing		+5.54
Source: Elections Prince Edward Island

==== Assemblyman ====
1979 Prince Edward Island general election
Party	Candidate	Votes	%	±%
Progressive Conservative	James M. Lee	4,968	60.05	+8.63
Liberal	Art Walsh	2,837	34.29	-8.55
New Democratic	Christopher John Brennan	268	3.24	-2.50
Draft Beer	Carl Borden Campbell	200	2.42	
Total valid votes		8,273	98.00	
Total rejected ballots		169	2.00	+0.28
Turnout		8,442	78.54	-4.43
Eligible voters		10,748		
Progressive Conservative hold		Swing		+8.59
Source: Elections Prince Edward Island

=== 1978 ===
==== Councillor ====
1978 Prince Edward Island general election
Party	Candidate	Votes	%	±%
Liberal	George Proud	4,298	52.22	+3.27
Progressive Conservative	Harry H. Cook	3,804	46.22	+6.40
Independent	A. Neil Harpman	129	1.57	
Total valid votes		8,231	97.94	
Total rejected ballots		173	2.06	
Turnout		8,404	82.99	
Eligible voters		10,127		
Liberal hold		Swing		-1.57
Source: Elections Prince Edward Island

==== Assemblyman ====
1978 Prince Edward Island general election
Party	Candidate	Votes	%	±%
Progressive Conservative	James M. Lee	4,246	51.42	+7.87
Liberal	Edward Watters	3,538	42.84	+1.03
New Democratic	Leo Richard McCormick	474	5.74	-7.92
Total valid votes		8,258	98.27	
Total rejected ballots		145	1.73	+1.24
Turnout		8,403	82.98	+29.68
Eligible voters		10,127		
Progressive Conservative hold		Swing		+3.42
Source: Elections Prince Edward Island

=== 1975 by-election (Assembly seat) ===
Prince Edward Island provincial by-election, February 17, 1975 Upon the appointment of Gordon Lockhart Bennett as Lieutenant Governor of Prince Edward Island
Party	Candidate	Votes	%	±%
Progressive Conservative	James M. Lee	2,343	43.54	+4.90
Liberal	David McLane	2,250	41.81	-9.17
New Democratic	Madrien Ferris	735	13.66	+3.29
Garden	Susan Partridge	53	0.98	
Total valid votes		5,381	99.52	
Total rejected ballots		26	0.48	
Turnout		5,407	53.30	
Eligible voters		10,145		
Progressive Conservative gain from Liberal		Swing		+7.03
Source: Elections Prince Edward Island

=== 1974 ===
==== Councillor ====
1974 Prince Edward Island general election
Party	Candidate	Votes	%	±%
Liberal	George Proud	3,692	48.95	-11.05
Progressive Conservative	James M. Lee	3,003	39.81	-0.20
New Democratic	Preston A. MacLeod	848	11.24	
Total valid votes		7,543		
Eligible voters		9,926		
Liberal hold		Swing		-5.43
Source: Elections Prince Edward Island

==== Assemblyman ====
1974 Prince Edward Island general election
Party	Candidate	Votes	%	±%
Liberal	Gordon L. Bennett	3,851	50.99	-11.82
Progressive Conservative	Norman H. Carruthers	2,919	38.65	+1.45
New Democratic	Ruth R. Smith	783	10.37	
Total valid votes		7,553		
Eligible voters		9,926		
Liberal hold		Swing		-6.63
Source: Elections Prince Edward Island

== See also ==
- List of Prince Edward Island provincial electoral districts
- Canadian provincial electoral districts
