= Francis O'Brien (Canadian politician) =

Canadian politician (1927–2020)

MLA (Councillor) for 2nd Kings
- In office 1982–1989
- Preceded by: Leo Rossiter
- Succeeded by: Walter Bradley

Personal details
- Born: December 15, 1927 Morell, Prince Edward Island
- Died: August 15, 2020 (aged 92) Souris, Prince Edward Island
- Party: Progressive Conservative

Francis Gerard O'Brien (December 15, 1927 – August 15, 2020) was a Canadian politician and farmer. He represented 2nd Kings in the Legislative Assembly of Prince Edward Island from 1982 to 1989 as a Progressive Conservative.

O'Brien was born in 1927 in Morell, Prince Edward Island. He married Rosella Magennis in 1953. He was a mink and beef farmer before entering politics.

O'Brien entered provincial politics in the 1982 election, when he was elected councillor for the electoral district of 2nd Kings. He was re-elected in 1986, but was defeated by Liberal Walter Bradley when he ran for re-election in 1989.
