= Tim Carroll =

Canadian politician and educator

Timothy E. Carroll

MLA (Councillor) for 5th Queens
- In office 1986–1996
- Preceded by: Wilfred MacDonald
- Succeeded by: riding dissolved

Personal details
- Born: January 17, 1951 Charlottetown, Prince Edward Island
- Died: December 27, 2025 (aged 74) Charlottetown, Prince Edward Island
- Party: Prince Edward Island Liberal Party

Timothy E. Carroll (January 17, 1951 – December 27, 2025) was a Canadian politician and educator. He represented 5th Queens in the Legislative Assembly of Prince Edward Island from 1986 to 1996 as a Liberal.

Carroll was born in 1951 in Charlottetown, Prince Edward Island. He graduated from the University of Prince Edward Island with a Bachelor of Business Administration degree, and the University of Saskatchewan with a Masters of Business Administration degree. He married Kathy Jenkins in 1978. In his early career, he was manager of the Ontario Vegetable Board for five years, worked as a marketing consultant in Western Canada and P.E.I., and was an assistant professor at St. Francis Xavier University and the University of Prince Edward Island.

Carroll entered provincial politics in 1986, when he was elected a councillor for the electoral district of 5th Queens, defeating Progressive Conservative incumbent Wilfred MacDonald. On May 2, 1986, Carroll was appointed to the Executive Council of Prince Edward Island as Minister of Agriculture. He resigned from cabinet in October 1988, but remained MLA and was re-elected in the 1989, and 1993 elections. He resigned as MLA on October 1, 1996.

Following his political career, Carroll continued to teach at the University of Prince Edward Island, where he was an assistant professor in the School of Business.
