= George D. Pope =

Canadian politician

George Dalrymple Pope (1867 – October 28, 1927) was a political figure on Prince Edward Island. He represented 5th Prince in the Legislative Assembly of Prince Edward Island from 1926 to 1927 as a Conservative.

He was born in Charlottetown Royalty, Prince Edward Island, the son of James Colledge Pope and Eliza Dalrymple Pethick, and was educated at the Ottawa Model School and Prince of Wales College. He served as comptroller of revenue in the Department of the Interior. Pope married Ethelwyn Calhoun. He was elected to the provincial assembly in a 1926 by-election held after Creelman McArthur was named to the Canadian senate. Pope was defeated when he ran for reelection in 1927. He died in Ottawa later that year.

His grandson Peter Pope also served in the provincial assembly.
