= Bobby Morrissey =

Canadian politician (born 1954)

Bobby Morrissey MP
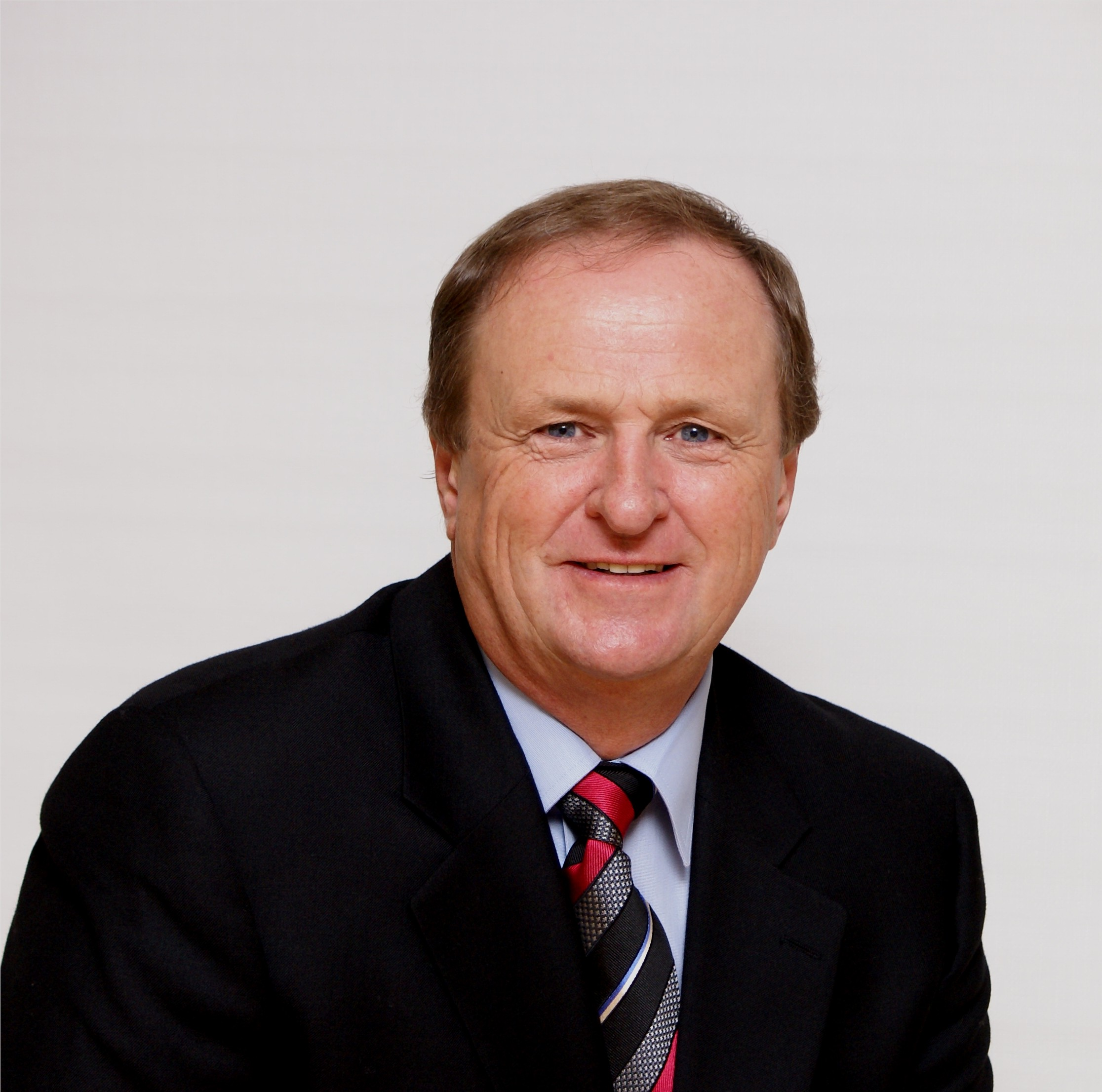

Member of Parliament for Egmont
- Incumbent
- Assumed office October 19, 2015
- Preceded by: Gail Shea

Member of the Legislative Assembly of Prince Edward Island for Tignish-DeBlois (1st Prince; 1982–1996)
- In office September 27, 1982 – April 17, 2000
- Preceded by: Russell Perry
- Succeeded by: Gail Shea

Personal details
- Born: Robert Joseph Morrissey; November 18, 1954 (age 71) Alberton, Prince Edward Island, Canada
- Party: Liberal
- Education: University of Prince Edward Island
- Occupation: Fisherman

Robert Joseph Morrissey MP (born November 18, 1954) is a Canadian politician. He represents the electoral district of Egmont in the House of Commons of Canada. He is a member of the Liberal Party.

Morrissey previously represented the electoral districts of 1st Prince from 1982 to 1996 and Tignish-DeBlois from 1996 to 2000 in the Legislative Assembly of Prince Edward Island. He was a member of the PEI Liberal Party.

== Political career ==
=== Provincial politics ===
Morrissey, a Liberal, was first elected to the Legislative Assembly in the 1982 general election for 1st Prince. He was re-elected in the 1986, 1989, and 1993 elections. He was re-elected in the 1996 election in the new electoral district of Tignish-Deblois.

On May 2, 1986, Morrissey was appointed to the Executive Council of Prince Edward Island as Minister of Transportation and Public Works. He became Minister of Industry and Minister Responsible for the Prince Edward Island Development Agency in 1989 and was also named Minister Responsible for the redevelopment of CFB Summerside and the community following the base closure by the federal government. On April 15, 1993, Morrissey was named Minister of Economic Development and Tourism and Minister Responsible for Enterprise PEI. Following the 1996 general election, he held the positions of Opposition House Leader and Opposition critic for finance. While a Member, Morrissey served on the Standing Committee on Privileges, Rules and Private Bills, and the Standing Committee on Community Affairs and Economic Development. He was the chair of the Standing Committee on Public Accounts. Morrissey did not reoffer for the 2000 general election.

=== Federal politics ===
In November 2007, Morrissey was nominated as the Liberal candidate in Egmont for the 2008 Canadian federal election, following the retirement of Liberal MP Joe McGuire. However, he withdrew his candidacy on August 5, 2008, choosing instead to return to the private sector.

On November 22, 2014, Morrissey was nominated as the Liberal candidate in Egmont, for the 2015 federal election. On October 19, 2015, Morrissey won the election, defeating Conservative incumbent Gail Shea and New Democrat candidate Herb Dickieson. He was elected chair of the Canadian House of Commons Standing Committee on Human Resources, Skills and Social Development and the Status of Persons with Disabilities in the 45th Canadian Parliament in 2025.

== Private career ==
Prior to entering politics in 1982, Morrissey was employed in the fishery. Since 2000, he was a consultant specializing in corporate/government relations, fisheries, labor market, and community development. He was also President of PFI Group, President of Global Food Technologies, and Director of Royal Star Investments.

== Community involvement ==
Morrissey served as a trustee of the Unit 1 School Board and was Chair of West Prince Community Advisory Board. He was also vice-chair of the Parish Council of St. Simon and St. Jude, and an organizer of the Tignish Irish Moss Festival prior to his election in 1982. Since 2000, he has served as a board member of the Heart & Stroke Foundation of PEI, was a founding member, President and treasurer of the Tignish Seniors Home Care Co-op, a member of the building and fundraising committees of the Credit Union Arena located in Tignish, and is Vice Chair of Tignish Special Needs Housing. Member of the Advisory Board to Holland College West Prince Campus.

== Personal life ==
Morrissey was born at the Western Hospital in Alberton, Prince Edward Island, the son of Bernard and Marie (née O'Connor) Morrissey, who lived in Seacow Pond near Tignish, Prince Edward Island. He is a Catholic. He currently resides in Seacow Pond.

== Electoral record ==
=== Federal ===
2025 Canadian federal election: Egmont
Party	Candidate	Votes	%	±%	Expenditures
Liberal	Bobby Morrissey	12,466	51.92	+5.98	$70,964.03
Conservative	Logan McLellan	10,419	43.40	+12.36	$99,933.91
New Democratic	Carol Rybinski	585	2.44	−6.21	$5,575.43
Green	Ranald MacFarlane	538	2.24	−7.17	$949.90
Total valid votes/expense limit		24,008	99.01	+0.26	$108,208.78
Total rejected ballots		241	0.99	–0.26	
Turnout		24,249	77.86		
Eligible voters		31,145			
Liberal notional hold		Swing		−3.19	
Source: Elections Canada
Note: number of eligible voters does not include voting day registrations.

2021 Canadian federal election: Egmont
Party	Candidate	Votes	%	±%	Expenditures
Liberal	Bobby Morrissey	9,040	46.21	+6.49	$52,360.87
Conservative	Barry Balsom	6,088	31.12	-3.24	$45,649.91
Green	Alex Clark	1,771	9.05	-10.76	$5,606.29
New Democratic	Lisa Bradshaw	1,688	8.63	+2.53	$3,620.46
People's	Wayne Biggar	974	4.98	–	$0.00
Total valid votes/expense limit		19,561	98.77		$89,655.36
Total rejected ballots		244	1.23	-0.11	
Turnout		19,805	68.94	-2.68	
Eligible voters		28,729			
Liberal hold		Swing		+4.86	
Source: Elections Canada

2019 Canadian federal election: Egmont
Party	Candidate	Votes	%	±%	Expenditures
Liberal	Bobby Morrissey	8,016	39.73	−9.52	$53,702.84
Conservative	Logan McLellan	6,934	34.36	+5.41	$65,608.31
Green	Alex Clark	3,998	19.81	+17.20	$14,320.88
New Democratic	Sharon Dunn	1,230	6.10	−13.08	$0.00
Total valid votes/expense limit		20,178	98.66		$85,525.15
Total rejected ballots		274	1.34	+0.93	
Turnout		20,452	71.62	−5.37	
Eligible voters		28,557			
Liberal hold		Swing		−7.46	
Source: Elections Canada

2015 Canadian federal election: Egmont
Party	Candidate	Votes	%	±%	Expenditures
Liberal	Bobby Morrissey	10,521	49.25	+17.94	$67,240.83
Conservative	Gail Shea	6,185	28.95	–25.70	$110,058.32
New Democratic	Herb Dickieson	4,097	19.18	+6.81	$34,718.49
Green	Nils Ling	559	2.62	+0.95	$4,895.27
Total valid votes/expense limit		21,362	99.59		$169,928.60
Total rejected ballots		87	0.41	–0.39	
Turnout		21,449	77.29	+5.62	
Eligible voters		27,751			
Liberal gain from Conservative		Swing		+21.82	
Source: Elections Canada

=== Provincial ===
1996 Prince Edward Island general election: Tignish-DeBlois
Party	Candidate	Votes	%
Liberal	Robert Joseph Morrissey	1,413	53.97
Progressive Conservative	Gail A. Shea	1,149	43.89
New Democratic	Howard Waite	56	2.14
Total valid votes		2,618	100.0
This riding was created from parts of the dual-member riding of 1st Prince.

1993 Prince Edward Island general election: 1st Prince
Party	Candidate	Votes	%	±%
Liberal	Robert Joseph Morrissey	3,530	55.13	-11.97
Progressive Conservative	Larry Gaudet	2,600	40.60	+10.48
New Democratic	Leroy Hiltz	273	4.27	+1.49
Total valid votes		6,403	100.0	
Assemblyman Election
Liberal hold		Swing		-11.23
Source: 1993 Election Results

1989 Prince Edward Island general election: 1st Prince
Party	Candidate	Votes	%	±%
Liberal	Robert Joseph Morrissey	4,001	67.10	+13.18
Progressive Conservative	Gerarda Corcoran	1,796	30.12	-15.97
New Democratic	Roger McPhee	165	2.78	–
Total valid votes		5,962	100.0	
Assemblyman Election
Liberal hold		Swing		+14.58
Source: 1989 Election Results

1986 Prince Edward Island general election: 1st Prince
Party	Candidate	Votes	%	±%
Liberal	Robert Joseph Morrissey	3,415	53.92	+3.82
Progressive Conservative	Gerald Keough	2,918	46.08	-3.82
Total valid votes		6,333	100.0	
Assemblyman Election
Liberal hold		Swing		+3.82
Source: 1986 Election Results

1982 Prince Edward Island general election: 1st Prince
Party	Candidate	Votes	%	±%
Liberal	Robert Joseph Morrissey	2,748	50.10	-4.90
Progressive Conservative	Gerald Keough	2,736	49.90	+4.90
Total valid votes		5,484	100.0	
Assemblyman Election
Liberal hold		Swing		-4.90
Source: 1982 Election Results
