= Walter Bradley =

Walter Bradley may refer to:

- Walter Bradley (engineer) (born 1943), American engineering professor, author, and advocate of the concept of intelligent design
- Walter Dwight Bradley (born 1946), Lieutenant Governor of New Mexico
- Walter Lyle Bradley (1943–2022), Canadian ice hockey centre
- Walter Scott Bradley (1891–1977), American composer
- Bill Bradley (cricketer) (Walter Morris Bradley, 1875–1944), English cricketer
- Walter Bradley (Australian politician) (1836–1893), Australian member of parliament for East Sydney
- Walter Bradley (Canadian politician) (1945–2023), Canadian politician in the Legislative Assembly of Prince Edward Island
