= John Whear =

Canadian politician

John Frederick Whear (January 1, 1867 – 1951) was a lawyer and political figure in Prince Edward Island, Canada. He represented 5th Queens in the Legislative Assembly of Prince Edward Island from 1900 to 1904 as a Liberal member.

He was born in Charlottetown, Prince Edward Island, the son of John Whear and Margaret Barnard. He studied at Prince of Wales College, went on to study law with Louis Davies and was called to the bar in 1890. In 1894, Whear married Florence J. Murchison. He was elected to Charlottetown City Council in 1900 and 1902, also serving as acting mayor. Whear was a member of the province's Executive Council. He was later named postmaster for Charlottetown.
