= Benjamin Rogers (politician, born 1836) =

Canadian politician

Benjamin Rogers (September 1, 1836 – January 21, 1911) was a merchant and political figure in Prince Edward Island. He represented 5th Queens in the Legislative Assembly of Prince Edward Island from 1893 to 1900 as a Liberal member.

Born in Kintleth, Carmarthenshire, Wales, the son of Jonah Rogers and Hannah Thomas, he came to Bedeque, Prince Edward Island with his parents in 1839 and was educated there. In 1854, he moved to Charlottetown where he partnered Thomas W. Dodd in a wholesale and retail hardware business, eventually becoming sole owner. In 1866, he married Mary L. Trenaman. Rogers was also a director of the P.E.I. Telephone Company.

He served in the province's Executive Council as a minister without portfolio. Rogers died in Charlottetown at the age of 74.
