= Jim Mayne =

Leader of the New Democratic Party of Prince Edward Island
- In office 1983–1989
- Preceded by: David Burke (interim)
- Succeeded by: Dody Crane (interim)

Personal details
- Died: July 16, 2015 Charlottetown, Prince Edward Island
- Party: New Democratic Party

James Herman Mayne (Aug 27, 1950 – July 16, 2015) was a Canadian politician, who was leader of the Prince Edward Island New Democratic Party from 1983 to 1989.

Mayne, a former president of the National Farmers Union, led the party in the 1986 and 1989 provincial elections. He also stood as the party's candidate in two by-elections during his term, in 4th Prince on December 2, 1985, and 5th Prince on September 14, 1987; in the 1985 by-election he became the first candidate in the party's history to earn enough of the popular vote to be reimbursed his electoral deposit.

He died on July 16, 2015, at the age of 64.
