= Jim Larkin (Canadian politician) =

Canadian politician (1946–2023)

MLA (Councillor) for 6th Queens
- In office 1979–1982
- Preceded by: John H. Maloney
- Succeeded by: Paul Connolly

Personal details
- Born: Alexander James Larkin; September 13, 1946 St. Peters Bay, Prince Edward Island, Canada
- Died: October 15, 2023 (aged 77) Charlottetown, Prince Edward Island, Canada
- Party: Progressive Conservative

Alexander James Larkin (September 13, 1946 – October 15, 2023) was a Canadian politician and businessman. He represented 6th Queens in the Legislative Assembly of Prince Edward Island from 1979 to 1982 as a Progressive Conservative.

== Life and career ==
Alexander James Larkin was born on September 13, 1946 in St. Peters Bay, Prince Edward Island. He married Helen Elizabeth MacDonald in 1971. Larkin graduated from the University of Prince Edward Island with a Bachelor of Science degree. Prior to entering politics, Larkin was the coordinator of the Prince Edward Island Federation of Municipalities. He also worked as the general manager of the Tourism Industry Association of Prince Edward Island and served on the executive of the Tourism Industry Association of Canada.

Larkin first attempted to enter provincial politics in the 1978 election, but was defeated by Liberal incumbent John H. Maloney. He ran again in 1979, and was elected councillor for the electoral district of 6th Queens. Larkin was defeated when he ran for re-election in 1982, losing to Liberal Paul Connolly by 28 votes.

Jim Larkin died from complications from Lewy body dementia on October 15, 2023, at the age of 77.
