= Alan Buchanan (politician) =

Canadian politician (born 1952)

Alan G. Buchanan

MLA for 4th Queens
- In office 1989–1996
- Preceded by: Wilbur MacDonald
- Succeeded by: riding dissolved

Personal details
- Born: October 28, 1952 (age 73) Belfast, Prince Edward Island
- Party: Green (2017–)
- Other political affiliations: Liberal (until 2017)

Alan Gilmore Buchanan (born October 28, 1952) is a Canadian university administrator and former politician from Prince Edward Island.

A native of the rural farming hamlet of Belfast in southeastern Queens County, Buchanan is a graduate of the University of Prince Edward Island and Queen's University. Buchanan served as a MLA in the Legislative Assembly of Prince Edward Island during the administrations of Joe Ghiz and Catherine Callbeck, holding several cabinet positions, including Minister of Provincial Affairs and Minister of Health. Buchanan has also held positions as a senior bureaucrat and policy advisor as well as a university lecturer. He was appointed to the Law Commission of Canada from 1999 to 2003.

Buchanan ran in the 2003 leadership race for the Prince Edward Island Liberal Party but narrowly lost to Robert Ghiz.

In 2017 along with former PEI politicians like Cynthia Dunsford also a former Liberal MLA and James Rodd the former Province's New Democratic Party leader from 2007 to 2012, did officially join the Province's Green Party due their party's member Hannah Bell won by-election in Charlottetown-Parkdale which becoming first time in PEI politics that third party won in by-election nd shared interest of Party's issue of promoting voting reform for province into adopting Proportional representation as their way to vote.

== Personal life ==
Buchanan subsequently worked as an Inter-Government Communication Officer with Island Telecom and later Aliant, as well as forming his own consulting and communication company.

In June 2005 he was appointed to the position as Registrar at his alma mater, the University of Prince Edward Island.

Buchanan has contributed articles to the journal Canadian Ethnic Studies. He also helped establish the advisory board of the Institute of Island Studies.

The son of Samuel Buchanan and Mae Gilmore, Buchanan married Deborah Ann Watts in 1978.
