= Order of Prince Edward Island =

Civilian honour for merit in Canada

- Insignia of the Order of Prince Edward Island

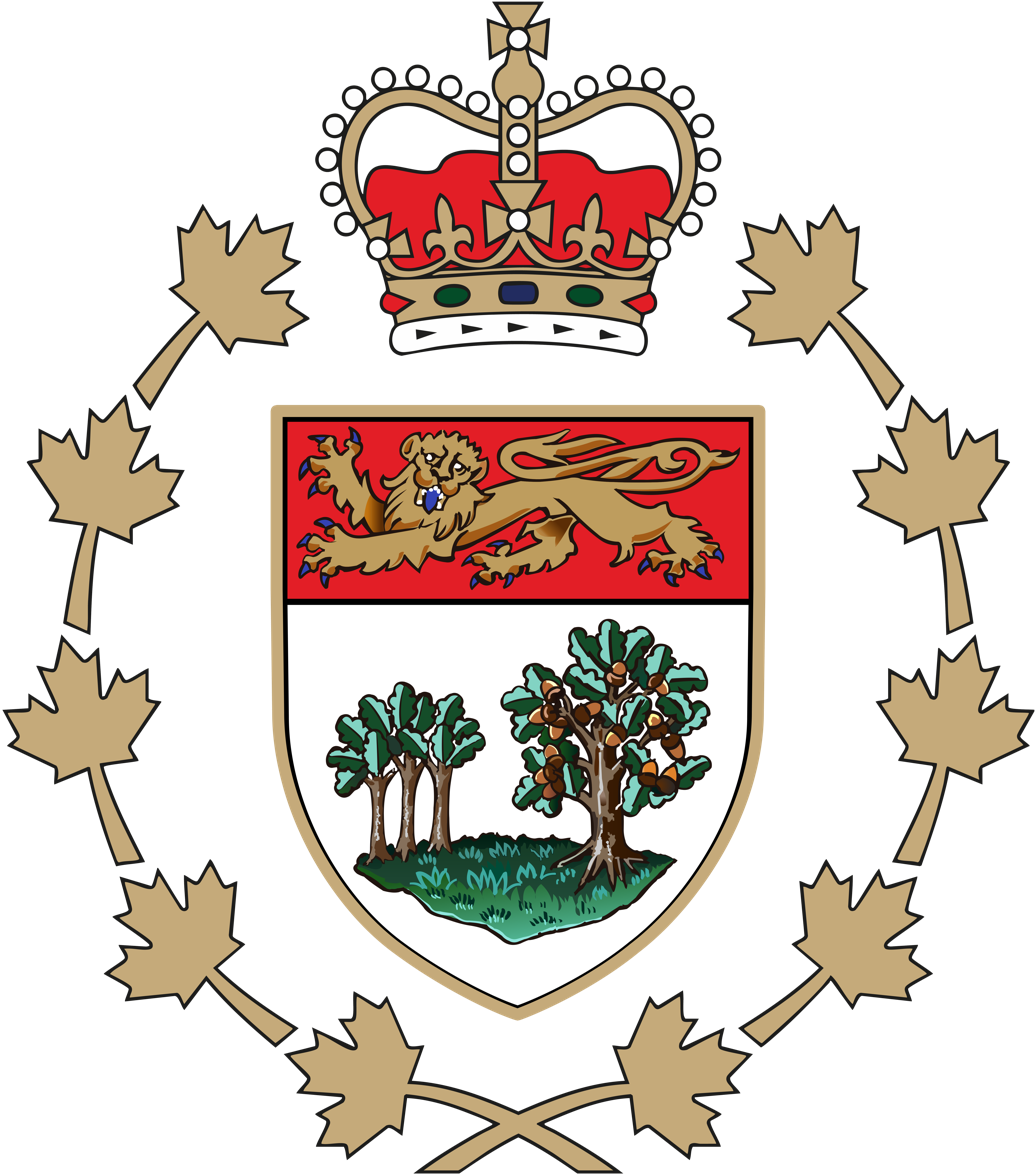
Awarded by the lieutenant governor of Prince Edward Island
- Type: Order of merit (provincial)
- Founded: 1996
- Eligibility: Any person current or former long-term resident of Prince Edward Island, save for politicians and justices while in office.
- Awarded for: Individual excellence or outstanding leadership in the community or in their chosen profession or occupation.
- Status: Currently constituted
- Founder: Gilbert Clements
- Chancellor: Wassim Salamoun
- Grades: Member
- Post-nominals: OPEI

Statistics
- First induction: 1996
- Last induction: Active
- Total inductees: 82

Precedence
- Next (higher): Alberta Order of Excellence
- Next (lower): Order of Manitoba
- Ribbon bar of the order

The Order of Prince Edward Island (Note: French: Ordre de Île-du-Prince-Édouard) is a civilian honour for merit in the Canadian province of Prince Edward Island. Instituted in 1996 by Lieutenant Governor Gilbert Clements, on the advice of the Cabinet under Premier Catherine Callbeck, the order is administered by the Governor-in-Council. It is intended to honour current or former Prince Edward Island residents for conspicuous achievements in any field, being thus described as the highest honour amongst all others conferred by the Prince Edward Island Crown.

== Structure and appointment ==
The Order of Prince Edward Island is intended to honour any current or former longtime resident of Prince Edward Island who has demonstrated a high level of individual excellence and achievement in any field, having made "remarkable contributions to the social, economic and cultural life of [Prince Edward Island] and its people." Although Canadian citizenship is not a requirement, those who are elected or appointed members of a governmental body are ineligible as long as they hold office, and only three people per year may be inducted into the order. The exception to these rules is the Chancellor of the Order, who simultaneously serves as the Lieutenant Governor of the province, and whose induction into the Order does not count against the three-person induction cap.

=== Nomination ===
The process of finding qualified individuals begins with submissions from the public to the Advisory Council of the Order of Prince Edward Island, which consists of the Chief Justice of Prince Edward Island, the President of the University of Prince Edward Island, the Clerk of the Executive Council, and two Members of the order from each of the province's three counties. This committee then makes its selected recommendations to the Cabinet, which vets the list and passes it on to the lieutenant governor. Posthumous nominations are not accepted, though an individual who dies after his or her name was submitted to the Honours and Advisory Council can still be retroactively made a Member of the Prince Edward Island. The lieutenant governor, ex officio a Member and the Chancellor of the Order of Prince Edward Island, then makes all appointments into the fellowship's single grade of membership by an Order in Council that bears the viceroyal sign-manual and the Great Seal of the province; thereafter, the new Members are entitled to use the post-nominal letters OPEI.

== Insignia ==
Upon admission into the Order of Prince Edward Island, in a ceremony held at Government House in Charlottetown, new Members are presented with the order's insignia. The main badge, called the Medal of Merit, consists of a gold roundel medallion, the obverse in enamel bearing at its centre the escutcheon of the arms of Prince Edward Island, all surrounded by a blue collar with the words MERIT • PRINCE EDWARD ISLAND. The ribbon is patterned with vertical stripes in green, white, and rust, reflecting the colours of the province's foliage and oxidized soil; men wear the medallion suspended from this ribbon at the collar, while women carry theirs on a ribbon bow at the left chest. Members will also receive for wear on casual clothing a lapel pin, appearing as a smaller version of the Medal of Merit.

== Inductees ==
Appointees into the Order of Prince Edward Island include:

- Angèle Arsenault OC OPEI, appointed 2005
- Reverend Éloi Arsenault OPEI, appointed 2004
- Georges Arsenault OPEI, appointed 2003
- Leone Bagnall CM OPEI, appointed 2005
- Carolyn Bateman OPEI, appointed 2016
- Chief Darlene Bernard OPEI, appointed 2008
- Léonce Bernard OPEI, appointed 2001
- Reverend Dr. F.W.P. Bolger CM OPEI, appointed 2004
- Emily Bryant OPEI, appointed 2012
- Marlene Bryenton OPEI, appointed 1998
- Garnet Rankin Buell OPEI, appointed 2008
- Marie Burge OPEI, appointed 1998
- Catherine Callbeck CM OPEI, appointed 2017
- William Callbeck OPEI, appointed 2011
- Dr. Sheldon Cameron OPEI, appointed 2006
- Alexander Bradshaw Campbell OPEI, appointed 2013
- Bill Campbell OPEI, appointed 2015
- Reverend Charles Cheverie OPEI, appointed 1996
- Gilbert R. Clements OPEI, appointed 1996
- Sibyl Cutcliffe OPEI, appointed 2012
- Eleanor Davies OPEI, appointed 2011
- Donald M. Deacon OC OPEI MC, appointed 2003
- Sister Mary Deighan OPEI, appointed 1997
- Dr. George Dewar CM OPEI, appointed 1996
- Vera Elizabeth Dewar OPEI, appointed 2013
- Gerald Sheldon Dixon OPEI, appointed 2015
- Dr. Dagny Dryer OPEI, appointed 2016
- Anna Duffy OPEI, appointed 2002
- Regis Duffy CM OPEI, appointed 2010
- Edith Eldershaw OPEI, appointed 1999
- Dr. Kent Ellis OPEI, appointed 1996
- J. Henri Gaudet CM OPEI, appointed 2000
- Allan Graham OPEI, appointed 2002
- Diane Griffin OPEI, appointed 2010
- Barbara Oliver Hagerman OPEI, appointed 2006
- H. Wayne Hambly CM OPEI, appointed 2014
- Wilma Hambly OPEI, appointed 2009
- Nancy Ann Hamill OPEI, appointed 2008
- James Hogan OPEI, appointed 1996
- Arthur Hudson OPEI, appointed 2000
- Dr. Albert "Bud" Ings OPEI, appointed 2012
- Derek Key OPEI QC, appointed 2005
- Frank Ledwell OPEI, appointed 2006
- Dorothy Lewis OPEI, appointed 2006
- H. Frank Lewis OPEI, appointed 2011
- Charles Linkletter CM OPEI, appointed 1997
- Elmer MacDonald OPEI, appointed 2009
- H. Wade MacLauchlan CM OPEI, appointed 2014
- William MacLean OPEI, appointed 2007
- Helen Stewart MacRae OPEI, appointed 1997
- Dr. Joyce Madigane OPEI, appointed 2013
- Dr. John H. Maloney OPEI, appointed 2001
- Maylea Manning OPEI, appointed 2001
- Shirley McGinn OPEI, appointed 2000
- Barbara McNeill OPEI, appointed 2004
- Heather Leanne Moyse OPEI, appointed 2014
- Ray Murphy OPEI, appointed 2007
- Dr. Hubert O'Hanley OPEI, appointed 1999
- Ulric Poirier OPEI, appointed 1996
- Marion Reid CM OPEI, appointed 1996
- Antoine Richard CM OPEI, appointed 1998
- Helen Robbins OPEI, appointed 2007
- Keptin John Joe Sark OPEI, appointed 2016
- Paul H. Schurman CM OPEI, appointed 1999
- Father Brady Smith OPEI, appointed 2010
- Kay Wall OPEI, appointed 2001
- Elmer Williams OPEI, appointed 2002
- Noel Wilson OPEI, appointed 2003
- Dr. David Wong OPEI, appointed 2013
- Frank Zakem OPEI, appointed 2009

== See also ==
- Symbols of Prince Edward Island
- Orders, decorations, and medals of the Canadian provinces
- Canadian honours order of wearing
