= Peter McNeil (architect) =

Canadian architect and politician

MLA (Councillor) for 5th Queens
- In office 23 November 1970 – 3 April 1974
- Preceded by: Elmer Blanchard
- Succeeded by: George Proud

Personal details
- Born: Peter Aloysius McNeil; 3 October 1917 Dominion, Nova Scotia
- Died: 4 August 1989 (aged 71) Charlottetown, Prince Edward Island
- Party: Liberal

Military service
- Branch/service: Royal Canadian Navy
- Years of service: 1941–1945
- Rank: Shipwright 3rd Class
- Battles/wars: World War II
- Awards: Defence Medal; Canadian Volunteer Service Medal; War Medal

Peter Aloysius McNeil (3 October 1917 – 4 August 1989) was a Canadian architect and politician. Born in Dominion, Nova Scotia, the eighth son and tenth child of a coal miner, McNeil worked as a farm labourer and carpenter's helper until the Second World War, joining the Royal Canadian Navy and attaining the rank of Shipwright 3rd Class. After completing a correspondence course in architecture while in the Navy, he returned to civilian life as a carpenter, carpenter's foreman, and architect. Professionally, he is most notable as an architect for the Diocese of Antigonish and the Diocese of Charlottetown, for which he built a number of churches and other buildings. He moved from Nova Scotia to Prince Edward Island in 1957, settling in the village of Parkdale, where he would serve as the chairman of the village commission from its inception until 1970. After the death of 5th Queens MLA Elmer Blanchard, McNeil became the Liberal candidate for the riding in the by-election of 23 November 1970; a race he would win. He represented the riding as Councillor until the end of the session, and did not stand for re-election. He continued to practice as an architect, designing schools, seniors' complexes, churches, and recreational centres. He was the first president of the Prince Edward Island Architect's Association, and a fellow of the Institute of Professional Designers. He died in Charlottetown, Prince Edward Island.
