= Gordon Lockhart Bennett =

Canadian politician

The Honourable Gordon Lockhart Bennett OC

21st Lieutenant Governor of Prince Edward Island
- In office October 24, 1974 – January 14, 1980
- Monarch: Elizabeth II
- Governors General: Jules Léger; Edward Schreyer
- Premier: Alex Campbell; W. Bennett Campbell; J. Angus MacLean
- Preceded by: John George MacKay
- Succeeded by: Joseph Aubin Doiron

MLA (Assemblyman) for 5th Queens
- In office May 30, 1966 – October 24, 1974
- Preceded by: J. David Stewart
- Succeeded by: James Lee

Personal details
- Born: October 10, 1912 Charlottetown, Prince Edward Island
- Died: February 11, 2000 (aged 87) Charlottetown, Prince Edward Island
- Party: Liberal
- Spouse: Doris L. Bernard
- Children: Frances Diane
- Education: Acadia University
- Occupation: Teacher, academic, educational administrator
- Profession: Politician
- Cabinet: Minister of Justice (1966–1970); Attorney General (1970–1974); President of Executive Council (1970–1974); Provincial Secretary (1972–1974)

Gordon Lockhart Bennett, OC (October 10, 1912 – February 11, 2000) was a Canadian teacher, politician and the 21st lieutenant governor of Prince Edward Island.

Born in Charlottetown, Prince Edward Island, he received a Bachelor of Science in 1937 and a Master of Science in Chemistry in 1947 from Acadia University. He started to teach in a school and joined the faculty of the department of Chemistry at Prince of Wales College in 1939.

In March 1966, Bennett was elected president of the Dominion Curling Association, succeeding Frank Sargent.

In 1966, he was elected as a Liberal candidate as a representative of 5th Queens. He was re-elected in 1970 and 1974. From 1966 to 1974, he held ministerial positions in the government of Premier Alex Campbell, including president of the Executive Council, Minister of Education, Minister of Justice, provincial secretary and chairman of Provincial Centennial Commission.

He was lieutenant governor from October 24, 1974 to January 14, 1980.

He was inducted into the Canadian Curling Hall of Fame as a builder.

In 1983, he was made an Officer of the Order of Canada. He was created a Knight of Grace of the Order of St. John in 1975.
