= Preston MacLure =

Canadian politician

MLA (Councillor) for 3rd Kings
- In office 1966–1970
- Preceded by: Douglas McGowan
- Succeeded by: Bud Ings

Personal details
- Born: July 30, 1913 Murray Harbour North, Prince Edward Island
- Died: August 31, 1972 (aged 59) Dundas, Prince Edward Island
- Party: Progressive Conservative

Preston Dalziel MacLure (July 30, 1913 – August 31, 1972) was a Canadian politician. He represented 3rd Kings in the Legislative Assembly of Prince Edward Island from 1966 to 1970 as a Progressive Conservative.

MacLure was born in 1913 in Murray Harbour North, Prince Edward Island, but resided most of his life in Montague, Prince Edward Island. He married Margaret Graham in 1936. An electrician by career, MacLure was also a cattle breeder.

MacLure entered provincial politics in the 1966 election, when he was elected councillor for the electoral district of 3rd Kings. He was defeated by Liberal Bud Ings when he ran for re-election in 1970.

MacLure died in Dundas, Prince Edward Island on August 31, 1972.
