= Marion Reid =

Canadian politician (1929–2023)

The Honourable Marion Loretta Reid CM OPEI

24th Lieutenant Governor of Prince Edward Island
- In office August 16, 1990 – August 30, 1995
- Monarch: Elizabeth II
- Governors General: Ray Hnatyshyn; Roméo LeBlanc
- Premier: Joe Ghiz; Catherine Callbeck
- Preceded by: Lloyd MacPhail
- Succeeded by: Gilbert Clements

MLA (Assemblyman) for 1st Queens
- In office April 23, 1979 – May 29, 1989
- Preceded by: Jean Canfield
- Succeeded by: Marion Murphy

Personal details
- Born: Marion Loretta Doyle; January 2, 1929 North Rustico, Prince Edward Island, Canada
- Died: June 22, 2023 (aged 94) Charlottetown, Prince Edward Island, Canada
- Party: Progressive Conservative
- Spouse: Lea P. Reid (died 1999)
- Children: 8
- Education: Prince of Wales College
- Profession: Teacher

Marion Loretta Reid CM OPEI (née Doyle; January 4, 1929 – June 22, 2023) was a Canadian politician who was the first female Speaker of the Legislative Assembly of Prince Edward Island, and the 24th as well as first female Lieutenant Governor of Prince Edward Island.

Born in North Rustico, Prince Edward Island, the daughter of Michael Doyle and Loretta Whelan, she was first elected in 1979 to the Legislative Assembly of Prince Edward Island as the Prince Edward Island Progressive Conservative Party candidate in the district of 1st Queens. She was re-elected in 1982 and 1986. She was Deputy Speaker, Speaker and Opposition House Leader. She was Lieutenant Governor of Prince Edward Island from 1990 to 1995.

In 1994, the PEI Council of the Girl Guides of Canada created an award in her name in recognition of her contributions. In 1996, she was awarded the Order of Prince Edward Island and was made a Member of the Order of Canada.

Reid died at the Queen Elizabeth Hospital in Charlottetown on June 22, 2023, at the age of 94. Upon her death, Premier Dennis King said she broke many barriers and greatly contributed to the province, as well as being part of PEI's Famous Five in 1993, when the top five legislative positions in a province were held by women for the first time in Canadian history.

== Arms ==
Coat of arms of Marion Reid
Notes The arms of Marion Loretta Reid consist of: Crest Above a helmet mantled Vert doubled Or on a wreath Or and Vert a coronet tréflé Vert rising therefrom a demi lamb Argent unguled Gules wearing a coronet fleurdelisé Vert holding between its forelegs a staff Or flying to the sinister a banner party per pale Vert and Or and over all an open book Argent bound counterchanged charged with a cross bottony party per pale of the field the banner bordered compony Vert and Or in the fly. Escutcheon Or on a pale between eight anchors Vert each side two and two dexter in bend and sinister in bend sinister a representation of the mace of the Legislative Assembly of the Province of Prince Edward Island Or. Supporters Two bloods Or crined, langued, queued and unguled Gules gorged with a collar Vert pendant therefrom a pomeis charged with a lupin blossom Or. Compartment A grassy meadow showing at the edge the soil of Prince Edward Island proper rising above waves of the sea Azure crested Argent. Motto Familia Et Ministerium
