= Prince Edward Island Liberal Party leadership elections =

The Prince Edward Island Liberal Party, a political party in the Canadian province of Prince Edward Island chooses its leadership by an open vote of party members at a convention called by the party executive when there is a vacancy in the leadership (or there is a temporary interim leader). The first convention was held when Alex W. Matheson sought reelection as leader in 1961.

== 1961 leadership convention ==
(Held in September 1961)

- Alexander Wallace Matheson 751
- J. Watson MacNaught 278
- W.E. Callahan 25

== 1965 leadership convention ==
(Held on December 11, 1965)

- Alex Campbell 765
- Lorne Bonnell 592

== 1978 leadership convention ==
(Held on December 9, 1978)

- Bennett Campbell 963
- Gerard Mitchell 382

== 1981 leadership convention ==
(Held on October 24, 1981)

- Joe Ghiz 905
- Gilbert Clements 482

== 1993 leadership convention ==
(Held on January 23, 1993)

- Catherine Callbeck 1,229
- Larry Creed 250
- Bill Campbell 77

== 1996 leadership convention ==
1996 Prince Edward Island Liberal Party leadership election
- Date: October 5, 1996
- Convention: Charlottetown
- Resigning leader: Catherine Callbeck
- Won by: Keith Milligan
- Ballots: 1
- Candidates: 4

The election was held on October 5, 1996. Former provincial cabinet minister, Keith Milligan won the leadership on the first and only ballot, defeating Wayne Cheverie, Ian "Tex" MacDonald and Dan Mullen. Milligan succeeded previous leader Catherine Callbeck as premier on October 9, 1996. Candidates were:

- Keith Milligan, former Liberal provincial cabinet minister
- Wayne Cheverie, former Liberal provincial cabinet minister
- Ian "Tex" MacDonald, former mayor of Charlottetown
- Dan Mullen, Charlottetown businessman

Result:

	First Ballot	
Candidate	Votes	Perc.
Keith Milligan	2,237	51.67%
Wayne Cheverie	1,836	42.41%
Ian "Tex" MacDonald	205	4.76%
Dan Mullen	51	1.18%
Spoiled Ballots	0	0.00%
Totals	4,329	100%

== 1999 leadership convention ==
(Held on March 5, 1999)

- Wayne Carew acclaimed

The Prince Edward Island Liberal Party leadership election of 1999 was held on March 5, 1999 to choose a new leader upon the resignation of former premier Keith Milligan. As the lone candidate for the leadership, Wayne Carew won by acclamation. Carew was defeated in the 2000 general election & resigned as leader. Ron MacKinley was chosen interim leader.

== 2003 leadership convention ==
2003 Prince Edward Island Liberal Party leadership election
- Date: April 5, 2003
- Convention: Charlottetown
- Resigning leader: Wayne Carew
- Won by: Robert Ghiz
- Ballots: 1
- Candidates: 2

The election was held on April 5, 2003. Ron MacKinley had served as interim leader since 2000, following the resignation of Wayne Carew as the previous leader. Robert Ghiz (son of former premier Joe Ghiz) won the leadership on the only ballot, defeating Alan Buchanan.

The candidates were:

- Robert Ghiz, son of former Premier Joe Ghiz
- Alan Buchanan, former Liberal provincial cabinet minister

Results:

	First Ballot	
Candidate	Votes	Perc.
Robert Ghiz	2,065	52.03%
Alan Buchanan	1,904	47.97%
Spoiled Ballots	10	0.25%
Totals	3,979	100%

== 2015 leadership convention ==
2015 Prince Edward Island Liberal Party leadership election
- Date: February 21, 2015
- Convention: Charlottetown
- Resigning leader: Robert Ghiz
- Won by: Wade MacLauchlan
- Ballots: acclaimed
- Candidates: 1
- Entrance fee: $2,500

The Liberal Party of Prince Edward Island, on February 21, 2015, chose a new leader to replace outgoing leader, Premier Robert Ghiz. On November 13, 2014, Ghiz announced his pending resignation. The Liberal Party had been the Government of Prince Edward Island with a majority in the Legislative Assembly since 12 June 2007, having won the 2007 and 2011 provincial elections. With the Liberals forming the PEI government, the newly-selected leader consequently became Premier of Prince Edward Island.

To be nominated, a candidate needed signatures from 50 party members, to pay the entry fee of $2,500, and to be approved by a green light committee. Nominations closed on January 20, 2015 with Wade MacLauchlan as the sole registered candidate. MacLauchlan officially became leader by acclamation at the February 21, 2015 convention.

Wade MacLauchlan was the only declared candidate. Former University of Prince Edward Island president

Date candidacy declared: November 28, 2014
Date nomination submitted: December 4, 2014
Supporters
Support from caucus members: Robert Vessey, Transportation and Infrastructure Minister; Wes Sheridan, Finance and Energy Minister; Doug Currie, Health Minister; Allen Roach, Innovation and Higher Learning Minister; Alan McIsaac, Education Minister; George Webster, Agriculture Minister; Kathleen Casey (MLA for Charlottetown-Lewis Point); Robert Henderson, Tourism Minister; Janice Sherry, Minister of Environment, Labour and Justice; Pat Murphy, (Alberton-Roseville); Ron MacKinley, Minister of Fisheries, Aquaculture and Rural Development; Buck Watts (Tracadie-Hillsborough Park); Hal Perry (Tignish-Palmer Road); Charlie McGeoghegan (Belfast-Murray River); Gerard Greenan (Summerside-St. Eleanors); Sonny Gallant (Evangeline-Miscouche); Bush Dumville (West Royalty-Springvale); Richard Brown (Charlottetown-Victoria Park); Paula Biggar (Tyne Valley-Linkletter)
Support from former caucus member: Alex Campbell, Premier of Prince Edward Island (1966–1978)
Support from federal caucus members: Wayne Easter (Malpeque), Sean Casey (Charlottetown), Lawrence MacAulay (Cardigan)
Other prominent supporters: Joe McGuire (MP for Egmont 1988–2008)
Policies

Keith Kennedy, an unsuccessful candidate for Mayor of Charlottetown in 2014, small businessman and environmental activist, ultimately withdrew. Kennedy joined the Liberal Party on November 21, 2014, and planned to walk through all of the province's 27 districts to collect signatures for his nomination and learn about the concerns of Islanders. Kennedy announced on January 16, 2015, that he was ending his unofficial candidacy due to MacLauchlan's insurmountable lead and his difficulty in fulfilling the nomination criteria.

Date candidacy declared: December 4, 2014
Date nomination submitted: None
Date candidacy withdrawn: January 16, 2015

Declined:

- Richard Brown, MLA (Charlottetown-Victoria Park 1997–2000, 2003–2019)
- Allan Campbell, former MLA (Souris-Elmira 2007–2011)
- Doug Currie, Health Minister
- Robert Henderson, Tourism Minister
- Robert Mitchell, MLA (Charlottetown-Sherwood 2007–2020)
- Wes Sheridan, Finance Minister
- Kali Simmonds, Charlottetown naturopathic doctor
- Robert Vessey, Transportation Minister

== 2022 leadership convention ==
The Liberal Party held a leadership election on 19 November 2022. On October 7, 2022, the party announced that Sharon Cameron, having been the only candidate to enter the race by the close of nominations, would be acclaimed as leader at the convention.

== 2025 leadership convention ==
Sharon Cameron announced her resignation on April 6, 2023, as party leader. Having not won a seat in the 2023 Prince Edward Island general election. On April 12, 2023, Hal Perry was named interim leader. The leadership convention on October 4, 2025 elected Robert Mitchell as the new leader over Todd Cormier.

== 2026 leadership convention ==
Robert Mitchell announced his resignation as party leader on July 16, 2026, after two consecutive by-election defeats. Hal Perry was named interim leader. On September 6, the party announced that Dan Kutcher, having been the only candidate to enter the race by the close of nominations, would be acclaimed as leader at the convention on October 25.

== See also ==
- Leadership convention
- Prince Edward Island Liberal Party

== See also ==
- Carty, Kenneth R. et al., Leaders and Parties in Canadian Politics : Experiences of the Provinces. Harcourt Brace Jovanovich Canada, 1992.
- Stewart, Ian and Stewart, David K., Conventional choices : Maritime leadership politics. University of British Columbia Press, 2007.
- Canadian Annual Review 1961.
