= Leone Bagnall =

Canadian politician

MLA (Councillor) for 1st Queens
- In office April 23, 1979 – March 29, 1993
- Preceded by: Ralph Johnstone
- Succeeded by: Catherine Callbeck

Interim leader of the Progressive Conservative Party of Prince Edward Island
- In office November 13, 1987 – June 11, 1988
- Preceded by: James Lee
- Succeeded by: Melbourne Gass

Personal details
- Born: Flora Minnie Leone MacKay; July 20, 1933 Springfield, Prince Edward Island
- Died: April 30, 2017 (aged 83) Charlottetown, Prince Edward Island
- Party: Progressive Conservative
- Spouse: Erroll Bagnall
- Relations: Donald Newton MacKay, grandfather
- Children: Five

Flora Minnie Leone Bagnall, CM OPEI (July 20, 1933 – April 30, 2017) was a farmer, teacher and former member of the Legislative Assembly of Prince Edward Island.

She was first elected to the Legislative Assembly of Prince Edward Island in the 1979 provincial election, representing the 1st Queens district. She was re-elected in 1982, 1986 and 1989. She was appointed Minister of Education from October 28, 1982 to May 2, 1986. Following the party's defeat in the 1986 provincial election, she briefly served as the interim leader of the Progressive Conservative Party of Prince Edward Island from 1987 to 1988.

In 1994 she was made a Member of the Order of Canada and was awarded the Order of Prince Edward Island in 2005. She also received the Queens Diamond Jubilee medal in 2002.

Bagnall died in Charlottetown on April 30, 2017, at age 83.
