= Lowell Johnston =

Canadian politician

MLA (Councillor) for 5th Kings
- In office 1978–1986
- Preceded by: Waldron Lavers
- Succeeded by: Barry Hicken

Personal details
- Born: July 3, 1926 Murray Harbour North, Prince Edward Island
- Died: August 16, 2003 (aged 77) Montague, Prince Edward Island
- Party: Progressive Conservative

Lowell Sterling Johnston (July 3, 1926 – August 16, 2003) was a Canadian politician and businessman. He represented 5th Kings in the Legislative Assembly of Prince Edward Island from 1978 to 1986 as a Progressive Conservative.

Johnston was born in 1926 in Murray Harbour North, Prince Edward Island. He married Mary Eileen Vanlderstine in 1948. In the early 1950s and 1960s, Johnston fished and was co-owner of a lobster-packing operation, he travelled throughout the province selling farm equipment, operated a cattle and grain operation on the family farm in his home community, and was a carpenter. In 1965 he purchased a small country store, which he operated with his wife and children, and two years later he opened a tent and trailer park.

Johnston first attempted to enter provincial politics in the 1974 election, but was defeated by Liberal candidate Waldron Lavers. Johnston ran again in the 1978 election, defeating Lavers by 49 votes to become councillor for the electoral district of 5th Kings. Johnston was re-elected in the 1979, and 1982 elections. Johnston did not re-offer in the 1986 election.

Johnston died in Montague, Prince Edward Island in August 2003.
