= Progressive Conservative Party of Prince Edward Island leadership elections =

The Progressive Conservative Party of Prince Edward Island, a political party in the Canadian province of Prince Edward Island chooses its leadership by an open vote of party members at a convention called by the party executive when there is a vacancy in the leadership (or when there is an interim leader).

== 1950 leadership convention ==
(Held on June 26, 1950)

- Reginald Bell presumably acclaimed

== 1957 leadership convention ==
(Held on September 17, 1957)

- Walter Russell Shaw 524
- George Dewar 522

== 1968 leadership convention ==
(Held on September 21, 1968)

- George Key 691
- Cyril Sinnott 474
- Ivan Kerry 159

== 1973 leadership convention ==
(Held on February 3, 1973)

- Melvin McQuaid acclaimed

== 1976 leadership convention ==
(Held on September 25, 1976)

- Angus MacLean 589
- James Lee 437

== 1981 leadership convention ==
(Held on November 7, 1981)

First Ballot:

- James Lee 581
- Barry Clark 348
- Fred Driscoll 282
- Pat Binns 237

Second Ballot (Binns eliminated):

- James Lee 665
- Barry Clark 463
- Fred Driscoll 281

Third Ballot (Driscoll eliminated):

- James Lee 737
- Barry Clark 577

== 1988 leadership convention ==
(Held on June 11, 1988)

- Melbourne Gass 599
- Andy Walker 572

== 1990 leadership convention ==
(Held on November 10, 1990)

- Pat Mella 473
- Barry Clark 382
- Roger Whittaker 32

== 1996 leadership convention ==
(Held on May 4, 1996)

- Pat Binns 1,284
- Wes MacAleer 527
- Gary Morgan 323

== 2010 leadership convention ==
(Held on October 2, 2010)

First Ballot:

- Olive Crane 819
- Jamie Ballem 692
- Peter Llewellyn 94
- Jamie Fox 79
- Fred McCardle 58

Second Ballot (McCardle eliminated):

- Olive Crane 908
- Jamie Ballem 604
- Jamie Fox 11
- Peter Llewellyn 7

== 2015 leadership convention ==
(Held on February 28, 2015; vote by preferential ballot)

First ballot:

- Rob Lantz
- James Aylward
- Darlene Compton

No candidate received more than 50% of the vote after the first count; Compton eliminated

Second Ballot (Compton eliminated)

- Rob Lantz
- James Aylward

2,954 ballots were cast. Vote counts were not released.

== 2017 leadership convention ==
(Held on October 20, 2017)

First ballot:

- James Aylward
- Brad Trivers

== 2019 leadership convention ==
(Held on February 9, 2019)

First ballot:

- Dennis King 2,014
- Allan Dale 746
- Kevin Arsenault 590
- Sarah Stewart-Clark 527
- Shawn Driscoll 307

Second ballot (Driscoll eliminated):

- Dennis King 2,071
- Allan Dale 803
- Kevin Arsenault 661
- Sarah Stewart-Clark 601

== 2026 leadership convention ==
(Held on February 7, 2026)

Results
Candidate	First ballot
Name	Percentage
Rob Lantz	2,889 votes 53.1%
Mark Ledwell	2,542 votes 46.9%
Total	5,437 votes cast

== See also ==
- leadership convention
- Prince Edward Island Progressive Conservative Party
