= 6th Queens =

Former provincial electoral district in Prince Edward Island, Canada

Prince Edward Island electoral district
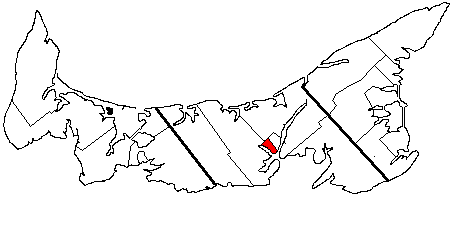

Defunct provincial electoral district
- Legislature: Legislative Assembly of Prince Edward Island
- District created: 1966
- District abolished: 1996
- First contested: 1966
- Last contested: 1993

Demographics
- Census division: Queens County
- Census subdivision: Charlottetown

6th Queens was a provincial electoral district of Prince Edward Island, Canada, which elected two members to the Legislative Assembly of Prince Edward Island from 1966 to 1993.

The district comprised the western half of the city of Charlottetown. Prior to 1966, the district was part of 5th Queens, and its creation marked the only redistribution of Prince Edward Island's provincial electoral districts to take place until the province adopted conventional single-member districts for the 1996 general election.

== History ==
The district was created for the 1966 Prince Edward Island general election following a redistribution that increased the Legislative Assembly from 30 to 32 seats, splitting the former 5th Queens district along the east–west axis of Charlottetown. Like all Prince Edward Island districts of the period, 6th Queens elected two members simultaneously: one Assemblyman and one Councillor.

In the 1982 election, Joe Ghiz won the Assemblyman seat and went on to serve as Premier of Prince Edward Island from 1986 to 1993.

The district was abolished following the adoption of the Electoral Boundaries Act (Royal Assent 19 May 1994), which reduced the Assembly to 27 single-member constituencies effective at the 1996 general election. Its territory was redistributed into Charlottetown-Rochford Square and Charlottetown-Spring Park.

== MLAs ==
Parliament	Years	Assemblyman	Party	Councillor	Party
51st	1966–1970	David Stewart	Progressive Conservative	Alban Farmer	Progressive Conservative
52nd	1970–1974	Allison MacDonald	Liberal	John H. Maloney	Liberal
53rd	1974–1978	Allison MacDonald	Liberal	John H. Maloney	Liberal
54th	1978–1979	Barry Clark	Progressive Conservative	John H. Maloney	Liberal
55th	1979–1982	Barry Clark	Progressive Conservative	Jim Larkin	Progressive Conservative
56th	1982–1986	Joe Ghiz	Liberal	Paul Connolly	Liberal
57th	1986–1989	Joe Ghiz	Liberal	Paul Connolly	Liberal
58th	1989–1993	Joe Ghiz	Liberal	Paul Connolly	Liberal
59th	1993–1996	Jeannie Lea	Liberal	Paul Connolly	Liberal

Sources: Elections Prince Edward Island.

== See also ==
- List of Prince Edward Island provincial electoral districts
- Canadian provincial electoral districts
