= Léonce Bernard =

Canadian politician (1943–2013)

The Honourable J. Léonce Bernard OPEI

26th Lieutenant Governor of Prince Edward Island
- In office May 28, 2001 – July 31, 2006
- Monarch: Elizabeth II
- Governors General: Adrienne Clarkson; Michaëlle Jean
- Premier: Pat Binns
- Preceded by: Gilbert Clements
- Succeeded by: Barbara Oliver Hagerman

MLA (Assemblyman) for 3rd Prince
- In office November 3, 1975 – March 29, 1993
- Preceded by: William Gallant
- Succeeded by: Robert Maddix

Personal details
- Born: Joseph Gérard Léonce Bernard; May 23, 1943 Abram Village, Prince Edward Island, Canada
- Died: March 25, 2013 (aged 69) Summerside, Prince Edward Island, Canada
- Party: Liberal Party of Prince Edward Island
- Spouse: Florence Gallant (m. 1968)
- Children: Michel, Pierre, Francine, and Charles
- Education: Evangeline Regional High School
- Occupation: Manager of tourism complex, manager of credit union, executive director of venture capital group, and chair of village commission
- Profession: Politician
- Cabinet: Minister of Industry and Minister Responsible for the Prince Edward Island Development Agency (1986-1989); Minister of Community and Cultural Affairs (1989-1991); Minister of Fisheries and Aquaculture (1989-1991)

Joseph Gérard Léonce Bernard, OPEI (May 23, 1943 in Abram Village, Prince Edward Island – March 25, 2013 in Prince Edward Island) was an Acadian-Canadian politician, who was the 26th Lieutenant Governor of Prince Edward Island, the third Island Acadian to hold this position.

Born in Abram Village, Prince Edward Island, he received his early education at Evangeline School in Abram Village, becoming a member of the first class to graduate from the school after the completion of its construction, in 1962. He then went on to take courses in bookkeeping and accounting while a member of the Royal Canadian Air Force. Soon after, he married Florence Gallant of Cap-Egmont, located in the same area as Abram-Village. Together, they have four children, Michel, Pierre, Francine, and Charles, as well as two grandchildren.

Before entering politics, Bernard served as office manager with McGowan Motors in Montague and as general manager of the Evangeline Credit Union in Wellington, Prince Edward Island.

He was first elected to the Legislative Assembly, as a member of the Liberal Party of Prince Edward Island, representing the district of 3rd Prince in a by-election in 1975, and was re-elected in 1978, 1979, 1982, 1986, and 1989, serving as a member of the Official Opposition from 1979 to 1986. He was Minister of Industry and Chairman of the P.E.I. Development Agency from 1986 to 1989, and from 1989 to 1991 was Minister of Fisheries and Community Affairs.

Bernard was always a strong supporter of the co-operative movement, both provincially and nationally, having served as President of the Conseil de la coopération de l'Î.P.É as well as vice-president and Treasurer of the Conseil Canadien de la coopération. Among other positions, he also served on the Advisory Committee of the Federal Minister responsible for co-operatives.

He was also very active in community affairs, having held executive positions throughout the years with such organizations as the Federation of Prince Edward Island Municipalities, the French Language School Board, the Wellington Boys and Girls Club, and the Evangeline Tourism Association.

He was appointed Lieutenant Governor on May 28, 2001. His term ended in 2006.

== Coat of arms ==
Coat of arms of Léonce Bernard
Notes The arms of J. Léonce Bernard consist of: Crest A demi lion Gules its dexter paw resting on a garden trowel Or. Escutcheon Bendy Or and Gules a cross flory Azure. Supporters Two foxes (Vulpes fulva) Sable embellished Argent each gorged with a coronet érable Or pendent therefrom a bezant, that to the dexter charged with masks of tragedy and comedy, that to the sinister charged with a treble clef Gules. Compartment A grassy mound set with lady slipper flowers proper. Motto Entraide
