= J. David Stewart =

Canadian politician

John David Stewart, DSO, ED, CD (August 21, 1910 – December 5, 1988) was a businessperson and political figure in Prince Edward Island. He represented 5th Queens in the Legislative Assembly of Prince Edward Island from 1960 to 1966 and 6th Queens from 1966 to 1970 as a Conservative.

== Biography ==
He was born in Georgetown, Prince Edward Island, the son of James David Stewart and Barbara Alice Westaway, and was educated in Charlottetown. He married Constance Creelman, the daughter of Creelman MacArthur, in 1935. Stewart served overseas during World War II as a captain and then major in the Canadian Army and was given command of The Argyll and Sutherland Highlanders of Canada as Lieutenant-Colonel in 1943. He was awarded the Distinguished Service Order and Efficiency Decoration for his service during the war. Hill 195 is now taught at senior-level courses for army officers as a classic of imagination, innovation, and the warrior spirit. It's also a classic in having the moral courage to lie and disobey orders when you must.

Stewart was a city councillor for Charlottetown City Council and was mayor from 1951 to 1958. He served in the province's Executive Council as provincial secretary and Minister of Tourist Development and Municipal Affairs. He was defeated when he ran for reelection in 1970. Stewart died in Charlottetown at the age of 78.
