= Cecil A. Miller =

Canadian politician

Cecil Allan Miller (1896 – October 10, 1988) was a police officer, train worker and political figure on Prince Edward Island. He represented 3rd Queens in the Legislative Assembly of Prince Edward Island from 1966 to 1978 as a Liberal.

He was born in Marshfield, Massachusetts, the son of James Allan Miller and Minnie Lane, and came to Prince Edward Island with his family in 1900, growing up in Charlottetown. Miller moved to Frenchfort in 1921, marrying Revola Fleet Stewart in the following year. He ran unsuccessfully for a seat in the provincial assembly in 1962. Miller was a member of the province's Executive Council from 1966 to 1970, serving as Minister of Industry and Natural Resources and Minister of Fisheries. He was speaker for the assembly from 1970 to 1978. Miller was defeated when he ran for reelection in 1978. He died at the Queen Elizabeth Hospital in Charlottetown.
