= Elmer Blanchard =

Canadian politician

J. Elmer Blanchard (March 6, 1927 – September 20, 1970) was a lawyer and political figure on Prince Edward Island. He represented 5th Queens in the Legislative Assembly of Prince Edward Island from 1966 to 1970 as a Liberal.

He was born in Charlottetown, the son of J. Henri Blanchard, who was the son of Jeremiah Blanchard, and Ursule Gallant. Blanchard was educated at Prince of Wales College and Saint Dunstan's University. He was called to the bar in 1953. In 1955, he married Jean Aylward. Blanchard was an unsuccessful candidate for a seat in the provincial assembly in 1962. Blanchard was named Queen's Counsel in 1966. He served in the provincial cabinet as Minister of Labour and Manpower Resources and then Minister of Justice and Attorney General. He died in office while tuna fishing at sea off the east coast of the island.
