= George McMahon (politician) =

Canadian politician (1929–2019)

Assemblyman for 5th Prince
- In office 1976–1986
- Preceded by: Earle Hickey
- Succeeded by: Andy Walker

Councillor for 5th Prince
- In office 1986–1987
- Preceded by: Peter Pope
- Succeeded by: Nancy Guptill

Personal details
- Born: May 30, 1929 Kensington, Prince Edward Island
- Died: January 25, 2019 (aged 89) Charlottetown, Prince Edward Island
- Party: Progressive Conservative
- Occupation: lawyer

George Rudolph McMahon (May 30, 1929 – January 25, 2019) was a Canadian politician, who represented the electoral district of 5th Prince in the Legislative Assembly of Prince Edward Island from 1976 to 1987. He was a member of the Prince Edward Island Progressive Conservative Party.

Born in Kensington, Prince Edward Island, McMahon was educated at St. Dunstan's University and Dalhousie University, and worked as a crown prosecutor in Summerside before his election to the legislature.

He was elected as assemblyman for 5th Prince in a by-election on November 8, 1976, and was re-elected in the general elections of 1978, 1979, 1982 and 1986. He served in the Executive Council of Prince Edward Island during the governments of Angus MacLean and James Lee, holding the roles of Minister of Highways, Minister of Industry and Commerce, Minister of Public Works, Minister of Justice and Attorney General, Minister of Labour and Minister of Community and Cultural Affairs.

Following the resignation of Peter Pope from the legislature, McMahon assumed the title of councillor for 5th Prince, and was succeeded as the district's assemblyman by Andy Walker. McMahon, in turn, resigned his seat in 1987 to accept an appointment to the Supreme Court of Prince Edward Island, and was succeeded as the district's councillor by Nancy Guptill. He died at a hospital in Charlottetown in 2019.
