= Wayne Cheverie =

Canadian politician (born 1950)

Wayne D. Cheverie (born May 19, 1950) is a Canadian former attorney, politician, government minister, and currently a justice of the Supreme Court of Prince Edward Island.

He was born in Charlottetown, the son of Charles George Cheverie and Clara Austin, and was educated at the University of Prince Edward Island and the Dalhousie Law School and made a career as an attorney in private practice. In 1975, he married Theresa Bennett.

Elected to the legislature in 1986, Cheverie served in various cabinet posts including Minister of Justice, Attorney General, Minister of Labour, Minister of Health and Social Services and Provincial Treasurer in the Prince Edward Island government under the administrations of Joe Ghiz and Catherine Callbeck.

Cheverie ran unsuccessfully for the leadership of the Prince Edward Island Liberal Party in 1996 against Daniel Mullen, Keith Milligan, and Ian "Tex" MacDonald, ultimately losing to Milligan.

Cheverie served as interim Leader of the Opposition after the Liberal Party lost in the 1996 general election to the PC Party under Pat Binns. He resigned from politics in 1997 to accept an appointment as chairman for the Prince Edward Island Regulatory and Appeals Commission.
