= Russell Perry (politician) =

Canadian politician

Joseph Russell Perry (June 1, 1915 – January 25, 1981) was a civil servant, merchant and political figure on Prince Edward Island. He represented 1st Prince in the Legislative Assembly of Prince Edward Island from 1970 to 1982 as a Liberal.

He was born at Palmer Road, on Prince Edward Island, the son of William T. (Slavin) Perry and Evelyn Poirier. He was educated there, in Summerside and at Saint Dunstan's College. He married Rosetta Gallant, with whom he had seven children: Marina, David, Joanne, Peggy, Betty Ann, Paula and Donnie. Perry served in the Canadian Army during World War II, and on returning was a protection officer for the Canadian Department of Fisheries near Tignish for 12 years. He moved to Tignish in 1956. Later, Perry operated a service station. He was deputy speaker from 1976 to 1978 and served as speaker for the provincial assembly from June 1978 to June 1979. He died at the Queen Elizabeth Hospital in Charlottetown at the age of 65.
