= Bud Ings =

Canadian politician

MLA from 3rd Kings
- In office 1970–1982
- Preceded by: Preston MacLure
- Succeeded by: Peter MacLeod

Personal details
- Born: Albert Earle Ings; February 5, 1926 Mount Herbert, Prince Edward Island
- Died: March 20, 2015 (aged 89) Montague, Prince Edward Island
- Party: Prince Edward Island Liberal Party
- Occupation: veterinarian

Albert Earle "Bud" Ings (February 5, 1926 – March 20, 2015) was a Canadian politician, who served in the Legislative Assembly of Prince Edward Island from 1970 to 1982. He represented the electoral district of 3rd Kings as a member of the Prince Edward Island Liberal Party.

Born in Mount Herbert, Prince Edward Island, Ings graduated from the Ontario Veterinary College in 1952. He served in the Executive Council of Prince Edward Island as Minister of Agriculture and Minister of Health. In 2008, he published his first book, Mud, Sweat and Tears : Tales from a Country Vet, and in 2010, published Vet Behind the Years : More Tales from a Country Vet.

In 2009, Ings was inducted into the Atlantic Agricultural Hall of Fame. In 2012, Ings was appointed to the Order of Prince Edward Island. Ings died in Montague, Prince Edward Island on March 20, 2015.
