= Walter Russell Shaw =

Canadian politician (1887–1981)

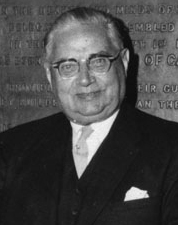

22nd Premier of Prince Edward Island
- In office September 16, 1959 – July 28, 1966
- Monarch: Elizabeth II
- Lieutenant Governor: Frederick W. Hyndman; Willibald J. MacDonald
- Preceded by: Alexander W. Matheson
- Succeeded by: Alexander B. Campbell

Leader of the Progressive Conservative Party of Prince Edward Island
- In office September 17, 1957 – September 21, 1968
- Preceded by: Reginald Bell
- Succeeded by: George Key

MLA (Councillor) for 1st Queens
- In office September 1, 1959 – May 11, 1970
- Preceded by: Frederic Large
- Succeeded by: Ralph Johnstone

Deputy Minister of Agriculture
- In office 1934–1954

Personal details
- Born: December 20, 1887 West River, Prince Edward Island
- Died: May 29, 1981 (aged 93) Charlottetown, Prince Edward Island
- Party: Progressive Conservative
- Spouse: Margaret MacKenzie (m. 1921)
- Children: 3
- Education: Prince of Wales College; Nova Scotia Agricultural College; University of Toronto
- Occupation: Livestock held worker, livestock supervisor, farmer, and civil servant
- Profession: Politician
- Cabinet: Deputy Minister of Agriculture (1934–1954)

Walter Russell Shaw, OC (December 20, 1887 – May 29, 1981) was a politician from Prince Edward Island.

A native of West River, Shaw was educated at Prince of Wales College, the Nova Scotia Agricultural College and the University of Toronto. On his return to Prince Edward Island, he farmed for several years, becoming a noted livestock breeder. Shaw worked as a civil servant in the provincial department of agriculture from 1934 to 1954, rising to the position of deputy minister. He also helped found the PEI Federation of Agriculture serving as its first general secretary. He entered politics in 1957 when he was chosen leader of the Progressive Conservative Party. He led the party to victory in the 1959 election becoming the 22nd premier at the age of 71.

The Shaw government supported the expansion of the province's food processing industry, instituted a regional system of high schools and revamped the employment system and pay scale for the civil service. Despite its support for the farming industry, Shaw's government failed to reverse the decline in the number of family farms and was unable to successfully diversify the economy. His government was defeated by the Liberal Party in 1966.

Shaw stepped down as party leader in 1968, and was succeeded by George Key, although as Key was not a sitting member of the legislature Shaw continued to serve as leader of the opposition until 1970, when he retired at the age of 82.

In 1971, he was made an Officer of the Order of Canada. Shaw was inducted into the Canadian Agricultural Hall of Fame in 1980.
