= William MacDougall =

Canadian politician

William James MacDougall (born May 8, 1944) is a Canadian clergyman and former political figure. He represented 4th Prince in the Legislative Assembly of Prince Edward Island from 1978 to 1985 as a Progressive Conservative.

He was born in Kentville, Nova Scotia, the son of James Lorn MacDougall and Gertrude Isabel MacLean, and was educated in Summerside, Prince Edward Island|, Prince of Wales College, B.A., Pine Hill Divinity School, M. Div., (now the Atlantic School of Theology) and New College, the University of Edinburgh, PhD. In 1966, he married Patricia Ann Campbell. MacDougall served congregations in Freetown, Lot 16, and North Bedeque, Prince Edward Island. He also taught religious studies courses at the University of Prince Edward Island.

He won the Assemblyman's MLA seat for 4th Prince in the 1978 Prince Edward Island general election|1978. He served as Deputy Speaker for several years. In 1985, he resigned his seat to accept a transfer to a church in Middleton, Nova Scotia.

In 1995, MacDougall left the United Church of Canada to join the Congregational Christian Churches in Canada and was the founding pastor of Emmanuel Congregational Christian Church in Middleton, Nova Scotia. In 2008 he became Chairman of the Board of Directors of the CCCC's after having served on the Board of Directors previously for six years and on the Credentials Committee of the church for two years.

Dr. MacDougall retired in 2011.
