= Albert Fogarty =

Canadian politician (1940–2024)

Albert Preston Fogarty (June 25, 1940 – September 21, 2024) was a Canadian educator and political figure on Prince Edward Island. He represented 1st Kings in the Legislative Assembly of Prince Edward Island from 1979 to 1993 as a Conservative.

== Life and career ==
Fogarty was born in Cardigan, Prince Edward Island, the son of James Wilfred Fogarty (1907 – 2003) and Julia Morrison (1914 – 1988), and was educated at Saint Dunstan's University, the University of New Brunswick and Saint Francis Xavier University. In 1963, he married Judith Diane McCabe. He was a high school teacher and principal. Fogarty served as president of the Prince Edward Island Teachers' Federation from 1969 to 1970. He ran unsuccessfully for a seat in the provincial assembly in 1974. He served in the provincial cabinet at Minister of Health and Social Services from 1981 to 1986. Fogarty was Superintendent of Education for the province from 1993 to 1994. In 1997, he became executive director of the adult and community education institute at Holland College, retiring in 2001.

Fogarty was a contributor to Minding the House: A Biographical Guide to Prince Edward Island MLAs.

Fogarty died in Charlottetown, Prince Edward Island on September 21, 2024, at the age of 84.

== Sources ==
- Weeks, Blair (2002). Minding the House: A Biographical Guide to Prince Edward Island MLAs. Acorn Press. ISBN 1-894838-01-7.
