= Wilfred MacDonald =

Canadian politician

Wilfred B. MacDonald (May 2, 1917 – April 4, 1992) was a merchant and political figure in Prince Edward Island. He represented 5th Queens in the Legislative Assembly of Prince Edward Island from 1979 to 1986 as a Progressive Conservative.

He was born in Vernon River, Prince Edward Island, the son of Benjamin R. MacDonald and Mary A. Johnson, and was educated there. MacDonald served overseas during World War II and settled in Parkdale on his return. In 1946, he married Stella Horgan. He also worked in construction and was a retail store manager. MacDonald served ten years as a school trustee in Parkdale. He was defeated when he ran for reelection to the provincial assembly in 1986. He served as Conservative whip in the assembly. MacDonald died at the Victoria General Hospital in Halifax at the age of 74.
