= Daniel Compton =

Canadian politician

Daniel James Compton (January 28, 1915 – April 18, 1990) was a merchant and political figure on Prince Edward Island. He represented 4th Queens from 1970 to 1986 as a Progressive Conservative.

He was born in Belle River, Prince Edward Island, the son of Benjamin Compton and Sarah Elizabeth. Compton served on the Canadian warship HMCS Swansea during World War II. He operated a general store in Belle River and was also involved in the timber trade. In 1947, he married Mary Agnes Compton from Massachusetts. Compton ran unsuccessfully for a seat in the provincial assembly in 1966. He served as speaker for the assembly from June 1979 to 1983.
