= Joe Ghiz =

Canadian politician and lawyer (1945–1996)

The Honourable Joe Ghiz QC

27th Premier of Prince Edward Island
- In office May 2, 1986 – January 25, 1993
- Monarch: Elizabeth II
- Lieutenant Governor: Lloyd MacPhail; Marion Reid
- Preceded by: James Lee
- Succeeded by: Catherine Callbeck

Leader of the Prince Edward Island Liberal Party
- In office October 24, 1981 – January 23, 1993
- Preceded by: Gilbert Clements (interim)
- Succeeded by: Catherine Callbeck

MLA (Assemblyman) for 6th Queens
- In office September 27, 1982 – March 29, 1993
- Preceded by: Barry Clark
- Succeeded by: Jeannie Lea

12th Dean of Dalhousie Law School
- In office 1993–1995
- Preceded by: Philip Girard
- Succeeded by: Dawn Russell

Personal details
- Born: Joseph Atallah Ghiz; January 27, 1945 Charlottetown, Prince Edward Island, Canada
- Died: November 9, 1996 (aged 51) Charlottetown, Prince Edward Island, Canada
- Party: Liberal
- Spouse: Rose Ellen McGowan (m. 1972)
- Children: Robert and Joanne
- Education: Schulich School of Law; Harvard Law School
- Occupation: Lawyer, Crown prosecutor, academic administrator, and judge
- Profession: Politician
- Cabinet: Minister of Health and Social Services (1986); Minister of Agriculture (1988–1989); Minister of Justice (1989–1993)

Joseph Atallah Ghiz QC (January 27, 1945 – November 9, 1996) was a Canadian politician and lawyer. He was the 27th premier of Prince Edward Island from 1986 to 1993, and was a justice of the Supreme Court of Prince Edward Island from 1995 until his death in 1996. He was the father of Robert Ghiz, the 31st premier of Prince Edward Island. Ghiz was the first member of a visible minority group to be premier of a Canadian province, since followed by British Columbia premier Ujjal Dosanjh and his son, Robert.

== Early life and family ==
Ghiz was born in Charlottetown, Prince Edward Island, to Atallah Joseph Ghiz, a Lebanese corner store owner, and Marguerite F. Ghiz (née McKarris). Ghiz was a graduate of Dalhousie and Harvard law schools and was a Charlottetown lawyer before entering politics.

== CBA Committee on the Constitution ==
Ghiz was active in the Canadian Bar Association. In 1977, in the aftermath of the election of the separatist Parti Québécois government in 1976, he was asked to sit on the CBA Committee on the Constitution. The mandate of the Committee was to study and make recommendations on the Constitution of Canada. The members of the Committee were drawn from each province of Canada, and included two future provincial premiers (Ghiz and Clyde Wells), a future Supreme Court of Canada justice, two future provincial chief justices, and a future Canadian Ambassador to the United Nations. The Committee presented its report to the CBA at the next annual meeting, in 1978. The Committee made wide-ranging recommendations for constitutional change, including a completely new constitution, abolishing the monarchy, changing the Senate, entrenching language rights and a bill of rights, and changing the balance of powers between the federal government and the provinces.

== Political career ==
He became president of the Prince Edward Island Liberal Party in 1977 and then party leader in 1981. His party lost the 1982 election but Ghiz was elected to the legislature and became leader of the opposition. He led the party to victory in 1986 with the Liberals gaining 20 seats to 11 for the Progressive Conservative Party of Prince Edward Island.

In January 1988, Ghiz declared that Islanders would vote in a plebiscite on the question of a "fixed link" to mainland Canada - probably the single most divisive topic in Prince Edward Island during the latter part of the 20th century. Ghiz later in life reported to have voted against the fixed link on his personal vote.

Ghiz supported the Meech Lake Accord and opposed the Canada–United States Free Trade Agreement. His participation in both debates made him a national figure. His government was re-elected in 1989 winning 30 out of 32 seats; it is speculated that this was in reaction to the federal PC government of Brian Mulroney's decision to close CFB Summerside. Ghiz's government subsequently accepted a $200 million funding agreement for highway construction in exchange for the provincial government allowing the federal Crown corporation CN Rail to abandon railway service in the province.

Ghiz favoured concessions to Quebec in constitutional negotiations and campaigned for the Charlottetown Accord, resigning three months after the accord was defeated in a 1992 referendum.

== Later life ==
Following his decision to leave politics, Ghiz served as dean of his alma mater, the Dalhousie Law School until 1995, when he was appointed as a justice to the Supreme Court of Prince Edward Island. Ghiz died of cancer in 1996. Several weeks before his death, he was driven by construction personnel across the largest completed section of the Confederation Bridge which had yet to be connected to the North American mainland.

His son Robert, served as the 31st premier of Prince Edward Island from June 12, 2007 to February 23, 2015 (leader of the PEI Liberal Party, 2003–2015). This was the second time in the history of Prince Edward Island that a father-son team both served as premier, the other pair (also Liberal) being Thane Campbell (1936–1943) and his son Alexander B. Campbell (1966–1978).
