= Alex Campbell (politician) =

Canadian politician and former provincial premier

The Honourable Alexander Bradshaw Campbell PC, OC, OPEI

23rd Premier of Prince Edward Island
- In office July 28, 1966 – September 18, 1978
- Monarch: Elizabeth II
- Lieutenant Governor: Willibald J. MacDonald; John George MacKay; Gordon L. Bennett
- Preceded by: Walter R. Shaw
- Succeeded by: W. Bennett Campbell

Leader of the Prince Edward Island Liberal Party
- In office December 11, 1965 – September 18, 1978
- Preceded by: Alex W. Matheson
- Succeeded by: W. Bennett Campbell

MLA (Councillor) for 5th Prince
- In office February 9, 1965 – September 18, 1978
- Preceded by: Lorne Monkley
- Succeeded by: Peter Pope

Personal details
- Born: December 1, 1933 (age 92) Summerside, Prince Edward Island, Canada
- Party: Liberal
- Spouse: Marilyn Ruth Gilmour (m. 1961)
- Relations: Thane A. Campbell (father)
- Children: 3
- Education: Dalhousie University
- Occupation: Lawyer
- Profession: Politician
- Cabinet: Attorney General (1966–1969); Minister of Development (1969–1972); Minister of Agriculture and Forestry (1972–1974); Minister of Justice and Attorney and Advocate General (1974–1978)

Alexander Bradshaw Campbell PC OC OPEI (born December 1, 1933) is a Canadian politician who served as the 23rd premier of Prince Edward Island from 1966 to 1978. He is the son of former premier Thane A. Campbell and Cecilia L. Bradshaw. He entered politics by winning a seat in the legislature through a 1965 by-election in 5th Prince. Later the same year he was elected leader of the PEI Liberal Party and, in 1966, took the party to power becoming one of the youngest premiers ever elected in Canada, at age 32. He also held the position of Attorney-General from 1966 until 1969.

== Education ==
Campbell attended Dalhousie University, where he earned a Bachelor of Arts degree and a law degree, and, in 1959, he passed the bar in Prince Edward Island. In 1971 he was recognized as a "Significant Sig" by the Sigma Chi fraternity, of which he is a member.

== Political career ==
Campbell's government attempted to strengthen the province's economy and improve social conditions by instituting programs such as assistance to homeowners and homebuilders. His government also revamped the educational system and established the PEI Heritage Foundation. He also started the Land Development Corporation and the PEI Lending Authority to help develop the economy. The government also brought in controls on absentee ownership of land.

== Legal career ==
Campbell left politics in 1978 to sit on the province's Supreme Court. Campbell delivered judgment in Government of P.E.I. v Walker in 1992, whose 1995 appeal has been cited in more than fifty subsequent cases.

== Personal life ==
A long-time resident of his hometown of Summerside, Campbell was a member of Scouts Canada and later served as a Scout Leader. In his retirement, Campbell now resides in Stanley Bridge during the summer months and is a part-time winter resident of St. Petersburg, Florida, where he has organized a "Prince Edward Island Picnic" at Desoto Park on the second Sunday of March every year since 2000.

Campbell was appointed to the Order of Canada in 2013.

Order of precedence
Preceded by Joan Marie Aylward as Lieutenant Governor of Newfoundland and Labrador	Order of Precedence of Canada as Member of the King's Privy Council	Succeeded by Otto Lang as Member of the King's Privy Council
