= Leo Rossiter =

Canadian politician

Leo Francis Rossiter (January 15, 1923 – October 25, 1996) was a merchant, realtor and political figure on Prince Edward Island. He represented 2nd Kings in the Legislative Assembly of Prince Edward Island from 1955 to 1981 as a Progressive Conservative.

He was born in Morell, Prince Edward Island, the son of J. Edward Rossiter and Catherine Clarkin, and was educated at Saint Dunstan's University. Rossiter operated a general store and sold farm equipment. In 1946, he married Anna Pierce. He served in the province's Executive Council as Minister of Natural Resources, Minister of Fisheries, Minister of Municipal Affairs and Provincial Secretary. After retiring from politics, Rossiter served as chair of the Workman's Compensation Board. He also served as chair of the Morell Village Commission. Rossiter died at the Queen Elizabeth Hospital in Charlottetown at the age of 73.

Leo Rossiter Anglers' Park in Morell was named in his honour.
