= James Lee (Canadian politician) =

Canadian politician (1937–2023)

The Honourable James Matthew Lee PC

26th Premier of Prince Edward Island
- In office November 17, 1981 – May 2, 1986
- Monarch: Elizabeth II
- Lieutenant Governor: Joseph Aubin Doiron; Lloyd MacPhail
- Preceded by: Angus MacLean
- Succeeded by: Joe Ghiz

Leader of the Progressive Conservative Party of Prince Edward Island
- In office November 7, 1981 – November 13, 1987
- Preceded by: Angus MacLean
- Succeeded by: Leone Bagnall (interim)

MLA (Assemblyman) for 5th Queens
- In office February 17, 1975 – April 21, 1986
- Preceded by: Gordon L. Bennett
- Succeeded by: Wayne Cheverie

Personal details
- Born: James Matthew Lee; March 29, 1937 Charlottetown, Prince Edward Island, Canada
- Died: October 10, 2023 (aged 86) Charlottetown, Prince Edward Island, Canada
- Party: Progressive Conservative
- Spouse: Patricia Laurie (m. 1960)
- Children: 3
- Education: Saint Dunstan's University
- Occupation: Real estate broker, tourist operator, and businessperson
- Profession: Politician
- Cabinet: Minister of Tourism, Parks and Conservation (1979–1980); Minister of Health and Social Services (1980–1981)

James Matthew Lee PC (March 29, 1937 – October 10, 2023) was a Canadian politician who was the 26th premier of Prince Edward Island from 1981 to 1986. He was the leader of the PEI Progressive Conservative Party from 1981 to 1987.

== Early life and education ==
Born in Charlottetown, Prince Edward Island on March 29, 1937, the son of James Matthew Lee and Catherine Blanchard. Lee was educated at Saint Dunstan's University.

== Island MLA ==
After a successful career in real estate and development, Lee ran in 1974 as a Progressive Conservative but failed to win a seat in the provincial legislature. Lee was elected to the PEI Legislature one year later after winning a by-election in 1975. Lee was re-elected in 1978, 1979 and 1982. Lee ran for the leadership of the Progressive Conservative Party of PEI in 1976 and narrowly lost to future premier J. Angus MacLean. When MacLean was elected Premier in 1979, Lee served in the provincial cabinet as Minister of Social Services and Minister of Tourism, Parks and Conservation from 1979 to 1980 and as Minister of Health and Social Services from 1980 to 1981.

== Premier ==
In 1981 Premier Angus MacLean resigned as PC leader and James M. Lee won the PC leadership convention held to choose MacLean's successor, thus becoming the 26th Premier of Prince Edward Island. Lee led his party to re-election in 1982. In April 1982, he was sworn into the Privy Council of Canada by Her Majesty Queen Elizabeth II.

A major accomplishment by the Lee government was the successful negotiation with the federal government to obtain the establishment of a school of veterinary medicine at the University of Prince Edward Island. Lee's government was defeated in the 1986 election which also cost him his seat in the legislature to Wayne Cheverie.

== Life after politics ==
Lee was appointed to be a commissioner on the Canadian Pension Commission and in 1998 became chairman of the PEI Workers' Compensation Board.

== Personal life and death ==
Lee married Patricia Laurie in 1960. He died on October 10, 2023, at the age of 86.
