= Johnny Young (politician) =

Canadian politician

Charles Frank Ross "Johnny" Young (September 1, 1931 – March 7, 1990) was a businessperson and political figure on Prince Edward Island. He represented 1st Kings in the Legislative Assembly of Prince Edward Island from 1978 to 1990 as a Liberal.

He was born in Red Point, Prince Edward Island, the son of Major Ralph Young and Nellie Mossey, and was educated on the island. He worked in Montague and outside of the province in Toronto, Ontario. In 1952, Young returned to Red Point, where he operated a service station and was a farm equipment dealer. In 1953, he married Helen MacLean. Young also operated a restaurant and motel. He served in the province's Executive Council as Minister of Education from 1986 to 1989. Young died in office from cancer at Red Point at the age of 58.

His son Ross was elected to represent 1st Kings in the by-election held following his death.
