= Saint Dunstan's University =

University on Prince Edward Island, Canada

- Type: Seminary, university
- Active: 1855–1969
- Affiliations: Roman Catholic
- Location: Charlottetown, Prince Edward Island, Canada; 46.256°N 63.139°W
- Nickname: Saints

St. Andrew's College, Prince Edward Island redirects to here.

St. Dunstan's University (SDU) is a former university which was located on the northern outskirts of Charlottetown, Prince Edward Island, Canada. SDU merged with Prince of Wales College (PWC) in 1969 to form the University of Prince Edward Island.

St. Dunstan's College was founded by the Roman Catholic Diocese of Charlottetown on January 15, 1855, as a seminary which trained young men for the Catholic clergy. The St. Andrew's College, founded in 1831, was its predecessor.

By the mid-20th century, the college had expanded into a small liberal arts university. A post–Second World War enrollment boom mandated an expansion which saw new residences and teaching buildings constructed on the campus located along Charlottetown's Elm Avenue (the Malpeque Road). SDU received a provincial degree-granting charter in 1917 but did not actually award its first bachelor's degrees until the spring 1941 convocation. SDU had formerly been affiliated with Université Laval, awarding joint degrees from the 1890s onward. Following the decision to start granting its own degrees, SDU severed the relationship with Laval by 1956.

Similarly to PWC, SDU also operated a high school, offering senior matriculation to those students wishing to continue into academic or professional studies.

Saint Dunstan's sports teams were known as the Saints.

By the 1960s, the provincial government in Prince Edward Island began a critical study of its post-secondary education institutions (PWC and SDU), concluding that a merger to form a provincial university was the desired funding and service model for future students. The merger was not without controversy as emotions ran high among supporters of both institutions; however, in May 1969 the last classes graduated from PWC and SDU, and the institutions were merged into the University of Prince Edward Island, which opened for the first time in September 1969 on what had been the SDU campus. At the same time as UPEI was formed, Elm Avenue was renamed by the City of Charlottetown to University Avenue, a name by which it is still referred to. The PWC campus on Grafton Street was taken over by the provincial government and formed the basis for a community college known as Holland College.

== Notable students and alumni ==
- Mike Duffy – Canadian Senator and journalist who briefly attended Saint Dunstan's University
- Jim Foley – CFL football player
- Bill MacMillan – NHL hockey player and coach
- Don McDougall – businessman
- George McMahon – Canadian politician
- James Cardinal McGuigan – Cardinal named by Pope Pius XII and Archbishop of Toronto, Ontario
- James Jeffrey Roche – 19th-century Irish-American poet and diplomat
