= Peter Pope (Canadian politician) =

Canadian politician

Peter MacArthur Pope (September 1, 1933 – June 1, 2007) was a Canadian businessperson and political figure on Prince Edward Island. He represented 5th Prince in the Legislative Assembly of Prince Edward Island from 1979 to 1987 as a Conservative and Independent Conservative member.

He was born in Summerside, Prince Edward Island, the son of George Reginald Pope, who was the son of George D. Pope, and K. Adele MacArthur, and was educated at Acadia University. In 1958, he married Georgie E. Lockhart. Pope ran unsuccessfully for a seat in the provincial assembly in 1974 and 1978. He sat as an Independent from February to May 1985. Pope served in the provincial cabinet as Minister of Transportation and Public Works from 1985 to 1986.

Pope was 73 years old when he died from liver failure at Prince County Hospital in Summerside.
