= Edward Clark (Canadian politician) =

Canadian politician

Edward William Clark (born March 24, 1932) is a farmer, beef producer and former political figure on Prince Edward Island. He represented 3rd Prince in the Legislative Assembly of Prince Edward Island from 1970 to 1996 as a Liberal.

He was born in Summerside, Prince Edward Island, the son of Ivan Leroy Clark and Macy Laura Miller. Clark served in the Royal Canadian Navy from 1951 to 1952. In 1958, he married Ruby Ida Best. He was a member of the province's Executive Council, serving as Minister of Agriculture & Forestry from 1978 to 1979. Clark served as speaker from 1986 to 1993. He resigned his seat in the assembly in May 1996.
