= Robert Campbell (Prince Edward Island politician) =

Canadian politician

Robert Erskine "Bob" Campbell (April 27, 1922 – May 31, 1992) was a farmer, used automobile salesperson and political figure on Prince Edward Island. He represented 1st Prince in the Legislative Assembly of Prince Edward Island from 1962 to 1992 as a Liberal.

He was born in Alberton, Prince Edward Island, the son of Keir Fraser Campbell and Eliza Mae Haywood. He served overseas in the merchant navy from 1941 to 1942. In 1943, he married Georgie Ona Lewis. Campbell farmed and raised cattle and hogs. He served in the province's Executive Council as a minister without portfolio from 1966 to 1972 and as Minister of Fisheries from 1972 to 1974 and from 1978 to 1979. Campbell died in office in Charlottetown at the age of 70.

His daughter Elizabeth married Hector MacLeod, who went on to represent 1st Prince in the provincial assembly from 1993 to 1996, and Alberton-Miminegash from 1996 to 2000.
