= 67th General Assembly of Prince Edward Island =

- Majority parliament

Parliament leaders
- Premier: Dennis King; May 9, 2019 – February 21, 2025
- Rob Lantz; February 21, 2025 – December 12, 2025
- Bloyce Thompson; December 12, 2025 – February 9, 2026
- Rob Lantz; February 9, 2026 – present
- Leader of the Opposition: Hal Perry; April 12, 2023 – present

Party caucuses
- Government: Progressive Conservative Party
- Opposition: Liberal Party
- Recognized: Green Party

Legislative Assembly
- Speaker of the Assembly: Darlene Compton; May 23, 2023 – February 27, 2025
- Sidney MacEwen; March 25, 2025 – February 12, 2026
- Brad Trivers; March 25, 2026 – present
- Members: 27 MLA seats

Sovereign
- Monarch: Charles III; 8 September 2022 – present
- Lieutenant governor: Antoinette Perry; 20 October 2017 – 17 October 2024
- Wassim Salamoun; 17 October 2024 – present
← 66th

The 67th General Assembly of Prince Edward Island is the 67th sitting of the Legislative Assembly of Prince Edward Island and the 41st since confederation in 1873. The membership of the assembly was determined by the 2023 Prince Edward Island general election, where the Progressive Conservative Party of Prince Edward Island, led by Dennis King, won a majority of seats. It was then reduced by one following the by-election of Green MLA Matt MacFarlane. Dennis King resigned as both premier and MLA for Brackley-Hunter River on 21 February 2025, and was succeeded as premier by Rob Lantz.

== Seating plan ==
	Arsenault	Dollar	Ramsay	Redmond	Deagle	Bell
	Hudson	Curran	MacKay	Thompson	LANTZ	Burridge	Compton
Trivers
		MacEwen	Croucher		PERRY	McNeilly	Bernard	MacFARLANE
	Dillon	MacLennan	DesRoches		Henderson	Simpson	Willows	Bevan-Baker

Current as of 2026

== Members of the General Assembly ==
Cabinet ministers are in bold, party leaders are in italic, and the Speaker of the Legislative Assembly is designated by a dagger (†).

Name	Party	Riding	First elected / previously elected
**Ernie Hudson**	Progressive Conservative	Alberton-Bloomfield	2019
**Darlene Compton**	Progressive Conservative	Belfast-Murray River	2015
Jamie Fox (until November 11, 2023)	Progressive Conservative	Borden-Kinkora	2015
Matt MacFarlane (since February 7, 2024)	Green	Borden-Kinkora	2024
Dennis King (until February 21, 2025)	Progressive Conservative	Brackley-Hunter River	2019
Kent Dollar (since August 12, 2025)	Progressive Conservative	Brackley-Hunter River	2025
Susie Dillon	Progressive Conservative	Charlottetown-Belvedere	2023
**Rob Lantz**	Progressive Conservative	Charlottetown-Brighton	2023
Natalie Jameson (until February 11, 2025)	Progressive Conservative	Charlottetown-Hillsborough Park	2019
Carolyn Simpson (since August 12, 2025)	Liberal	Charlottetown-Hillsborough Park	2025
Karla Bernard	Green	Charlottetown-Victoria Park	2019
Gordon McNeilly	Liberal	Charlottetown-West Royalty	2019
**Zack Bell**	Progressive Conservative	Charlottetown-Winsloe	2020
Mark McLane (until March 17, 2026)	Progressive Conservative	Cornwall-Meadowbank	2021
Tayte Willows (since July 13, 2026)	Green	Cornwall-Meadowbank	2026
Gilles Arsenault	Progressive Conservative	Evangeline-Miscouche	2023
Gilles Arsenault	Independent	Evangeline-Miscouche	2023
Steven Myers (until October 3, 2025)	Progressive Conservative	Georgetown-Pownal	2011
Brendan Curran (since December 8, 2025)	Progressive Conservative	Georgetown-Pownal	2025
Matthew MacKay	Progressive Conservative	Kensington-Malpeque	2015
**Jenn Redmond**	Progressive Conservative	Mermaid-Stratford	2023
**Cory Deagle**	Progressive Conservative	Montague-Kilmuir	2019
**Sidney MacEwen**	Progressive Conservative	Morell-Donagh	2015
Peter Bevan-Baker	Green	New Haven-Rocky Point	2015
Robert Henderson	Liberal	O'Leary-Inverness	2007
Brad Trivers†	Progressive Conservative	Rustico-Emerald	2015
**Robin Croucher**	Progressive Conservative	Souris-Elmira	2023
**Bloyce Thompson**	Progressive Conservative	Stanhope-Marshfield	2019
**Jill Burridge**	Progressive Conservative	Stratford-Keppoch	2023
**Barb Ramsay**	Progressive Conservative	Summerside-South Drive	2023
Tyler DesRoches	Progressive Conservative	Summerside-Wilmot	2023
Hal Perry	Liberal	Tignish-Palmer Road	2011 (Note: First elected as a Progressive Conservative)
Hilton MacLennan	Progressive Conservative	Tyne Valley-Sherbrooke	2023

== Party membership ==
Number of members per party by date	2023		2024	2025					2026		
Number of members per party by date	Apr 3	Nov 11	Feb 7	Feb 11	Feb 21	Aug 12	Oct 3	Dec 8	Mar 17	Mar 29	Jul 13
Progressive Conservative	22	21		20	19	20	19	20	19	18	
Liberal	3					4					
Green	2		3								4
Independent	0									1	
Total members	27	26	27	26	25	27	26	27	26		27
Vacant	0	1	0	1	2	0	1	0	1		0
Government Majority	17	16	15	14		13		12	13	12	11

=== Membership changes ===
Membership changes in the 67th Assembly
Date	Name	District	Party	Reason
April 3, 2023	See List of Members		Election day of the 2023 Prince Edward Island general election	
November 11, 2023	Jamie Fox	Borden-Kinkora	Progressive Conservative	Resigned to run for Malpeque seat, in the 2025 federal election
February 7, 2024	Matt MacFarlane	Borden-Kinkora	Green	Won by-election
February 11, 2025	Natalie Jameson	Charlottetown-Hillsborough Park	Progressive Conservative	Resigned to run for Charlottetown seat, in the 2025 federal election
February 21, 2025	Dennis King	Brackley-Hunter River	Progressive Conservative	Resigned; later appointed Ambassador to Ireland
August 12, 2025	Carolyn Simpson	Charlottetown-Hillsborough Park	Liberal	Won by-election
August 12, 2025	Kent Dollar	Brackley-Hunter River	Progressive Conservative	Won by-election
October 3, 2025	Steven Myers	Georgetown-Pownal	Progressive Conservative	Resigned
December 8, 2025	Brendan Curran	Georgetown-Pownal	Progressive Conservative	Won by-election
March 17, 2026	Mark McLane	Cornwall-Meadowbank	Progressive Conservative	Died in office.
July 13, 2026	Tayte Willows	Cornwall-Meadowbank	Green	Won by-election

== See also ==
- List of Prince Edward Island General Assemblies
