= 2026 Progressive Conservative Party of Prince Edward Island leadership election =

Canadian political party election

- February 7, 2026
- Turnout: 5,437 (87%)
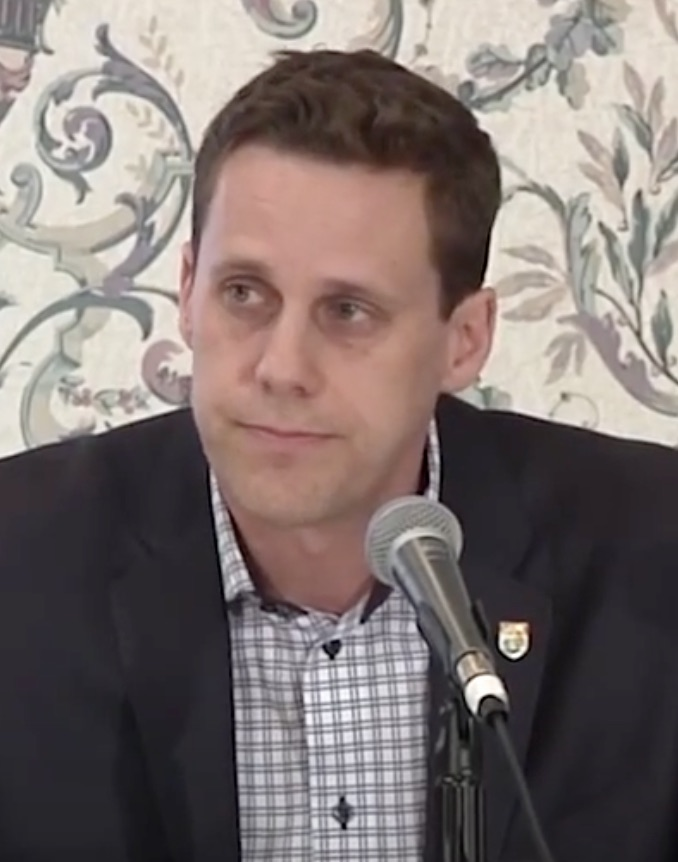
		ML
Candidate	Rob Lantz	Mark Ledwell
Popular Vote	2,889	2,542
Percentage	53.1%	46.9%
Leader before election
Bloyce Thompson (interim)
Elected Leader
Rob Lantz

2026 Progressive Conservative Party of Prince Edward Island leadership election
- Date: February 7, 2026
- Convention: Eastlink Centre, Charlottetown
- Resigning leader: Dennis King
- Won by: Rob Lantz
- Ballots: 1
- Candidates: 2

In 2026, the Progressive Conservative Party of Prince Edward Island held a leadership election to choose a successor to Dennis King. The election was triggered on February 20, 2025, after King announced his resignation as leader of the Progressive Conservative Party and Premier of Prince Edward Island, effective the following day. The PC caucus selected Rob Lantz as premier and interim leader, pending the election of his successor. In December 2025, Lantz resigned from both positions to seek the permanent leadership and was succeeded by Bloyce Thompson.

On February 7, 2026, Lantz, the winner of the 2015 leadership election, defeated lawyer Mark Ledwell and returned as PC leader and premier.

== Timeline ==
- February 20, 2025 – Progressive Conservative leader and Premier Dennis King announced his resignation (effective the following day), in a press conference.
- February 21, 2025 – King resigns, Rob Lantz appointed interim leader and Premier until a successor is elected.
- February 21, 2025 – MLA Cory Deagle announces his candidacy.
- May 22, 2025 – Lawyer Mark Ledwell announces his candidacy.
- October 10, 2025 – Deagle withdraws his candidacy.
- December 10, 2025 – Leadership election date set for February 7, 2026.
- December 8, 2025 – Progressive Conservative candidate Brendan Curran defeated Liberal leader Robert Mitchell in the 2025 Georgetown-Pownal provincial by-election by a five-point margin, a substantially reduced margin from the 57-point margin outgoing MLA Steven Myers, a former minister and former interim party leader, secured in the 2023 provincial election.
- December 11, 2025 – PC interim leader and Premier, Rob Lantz, announces resignation from both positions in order to run for party leadership.
- December 12, 2025 – Lantz's resignations take effect. Bloyce Thompson becomes premier and interim party leader.
- January 14, 2026 – First leadership forum took place at the Consolidated Credit Union Place in Summerside.
- January 16, 2026 – Last day to join the party to vote.
- January 22, 2026 – Second leadership forum took place at the Cavendish Farms Wellness Centre in Montague.
- February 2, 2026 – Third and final leadership forum took place at the Confederation Centre of the Arts in Charlottetown.
- February 7, 2026 – Leadership convention takes place at the Eastlink Centre in Charlottetown. Final day to vote online or in-person. Rob Lantz is elected leader on the only ballot.

== Candidates ==
=== Approved ===
==== Rob Lantz ====
Rob Lantz is the MLA for Charlottetown-Brighton since 2023. He was the Minister of Housing, Land and Communities from 2023 to 2024 and the Minister of Education and Early Years from 2024 to 2025. He was previously elected party leader in 2015, resigning later that year. Following Dennis King's resignation, Lantz was named interim party leader and sworn in as Premier; he resigned from both positions to enter the leadership contest. (Declared December 11, 2025)

Endorsements of Rob Lantz

Current caucus members: (14)

- Zack Bell – MLA for Charlottetown-Winsloe (since 2020); fisheries, tourism & culture minister (since 2024)
- Robin Croucher – MLA for Souris-Elmira (since 2023), education minister (since 2025)
- Brendan Curran – MLA for Georgetown-Pownal (since 2025)
- Cory Deagle – withdrawn contestant; MLA for Montague-Kilmuir (since 2019); housing & communities ministry (since 2025); cabinet minister (2022–2025); withdrawn 2026 leadership candidate
- Mark McLane – MLA for Cornwall-Meadowbank (since 2021); health minister (since 2023); finance minister (2022–2023)
- Barb Ramsay – MLA for Summerside-South Drive (since 2023); social development minister (since 2023)
- Bloyce Thompson, premier and interim leader (since 2025); MLA for Stanhope-Marshfield (since 2019)
- Brad Trivers – MLA for Rustico-Emerald (since 2015); deputy speaker (since 2025); cabinet minister (2019–2022)
- Matthew MacKay– MLA for Kensington-Malpeque (Since 2015)
- Ernie Hudson– MLA for Alberton-Bloomfield (Since 2019); Minister of Transportation and Infrastructure (since 2023)
- Jenn Redmond– MLA for Mermaid-Stratford (Since 2023); Minister of workforce, Advance learning and population (since 2023); Minister responsible for the status of women (Since 2024)
- Kent Dollar– MLA for Brackley-Hunter River (Since 2025)
- Gilles Arsenault– MLA for Evangeline-Miscouche (Since 2023); Minister of Environment, Energy, and Climate action (Since 2023); Minister Responsible for Acadian and Francophone Affairs (Since 2025)
- Jill Burridge– MLA for Stratford-Keppoch (since 2023); Minister of finance (since 2023)

==== Mark Ledwell ====
Mark Ledwell is a lawyer and former managing partner at Gowling WLG. He has advised on issues related to finance, infrastructure, energy and agri-food. (Declared May 22, 2025)

Endorsements of Mark Ledwell

Current caucus members: (5)

- Darlene Compton – MLA for Belfast-Murray River (since 2015); economic development minister (since 2025); deputy premier and cabinet minister (2019–2023); Speaker (2023–2025)
- Hilton MacLennan– MLA for Tyne Valley-Sherbrooke (Since 2023)
- Susie Dillon– MLA for Charlottetown-Belvedere (Since 2023)
- Tyler DesRoches– MLA for Summerside-Wilmot (Since 2023)
- Sidney MacEwen– MLA for Morell-Donagh (Since 2019); Speaker (Since 2025)

Former caucus members: (3)

- Pat Binns – Premier of Prince Edward Island (1996–2007); party leader (1996–2007); MLA / Aseemblyman (1978–1984 & 1996–2007); cabinet minister (1979–1984); MP for Cardigan 1984–1988
- Jamie Fox – MLA for Borden-Kinkora (2015–2023), interim party leader (2015–2017), fisheries and communities minister (2019–2023)
- Jamie Ballem – MLA for Stanhope-East Royalty (1996–2007); cabinet minister (2000–2007); runner up in the 2010 leadership contest

Other prominent individuals

- Jean Charest – Premier of Quebec (2003–2012), Deputy Prime Minister of Canada (1993), federal cabinet minister (1986–1990 & 1991–1993); leader of Progressive Conservative Party of Canada (1993–1998)

=== Withdrawn ===
==== Cory Deagle ====
Minister of Fisheries and Communities (2023–2025), MLA for Montague-Kilmuir (2019–present). (Declared February 26, 2025, Withdrew October 10, 2025)

Endorsements of Cory Deagle

Current caucus members: (3)

- Zack Bell – MLA for Charlottetown-Winsloe (since 2020); subsequently supported Lantz
- Brad Trivers – MLA for Rustico-Emerald (since 2015); subsequently supported Lantz
- Tyler DesRoches – MLA for Summerside-Wilmot (since 2023); subsequently endorsed Ledwell

Former caucus members: (1)

- Steven Myers, MLA for Georgetown-Pownal/Georgetown-St. Peters (2011–2025); interim party leader (2013), Leader of the Opposition (2013–2015); cabinet minister (2019–2025)

== Results ==
Results
Candidate	First ballot
Name	Percentage
Rob Lantz	2,889 votes 53.1%
Mark Ledwell	2,542 votes 46.9%
Total	5,437 votes cast
