= 68th Prince Edward Island general election =

- On or before October 4, 2027

All 27 seats in the Legislative Assembly of Prince Edward Island 14 seats needed for a majority
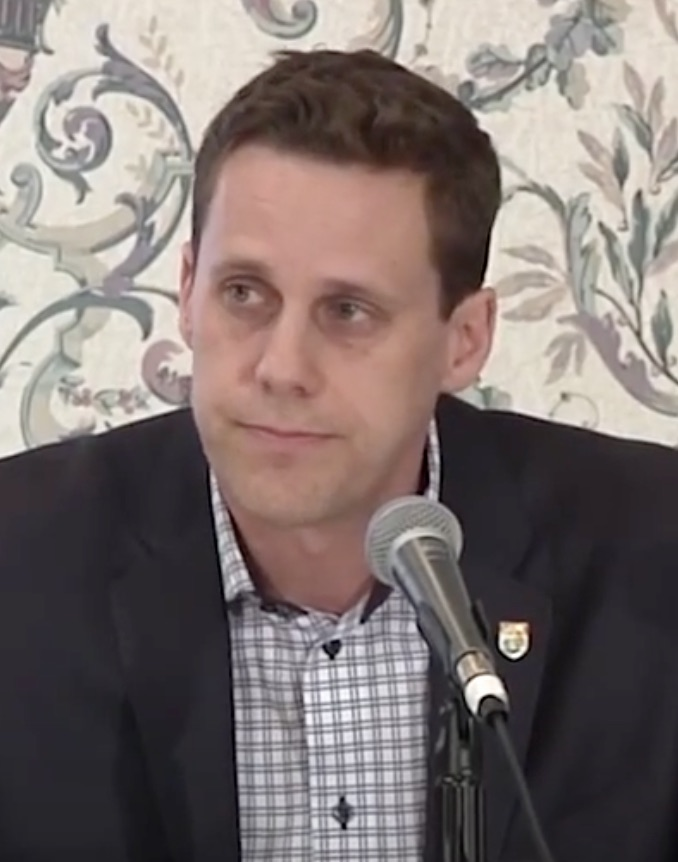
		LIB	GRN
Leader	Rob Lantz	Dan Kutcher	Matt MacFarlane
Party	Progressive Conservative	Liberal	Green
Leader since	February 7, 2026 (Note: Lantz was initially appointed as interim party leader on February 21, 2025, but vacated the position from December 11, 2025 to February 7, 2026 in order to seek the permanent leadership.)	October 25, 2026	June 7, 2025
Leader's seat	Charlottetown-Brighton	Running in Summerside-Wilmot	Borden-Kinkora
Last election	22 seats, 55.92%	3 seats, 17.21%	2 seats, 21.57%
Current seats	18	4	4
Incumbent Premier
Rob Lantz
Progressive Conservative

The 68th Prince Edward Island general election is the next general election to be held in the Canadian province of Prince Edward Island (PEI), to elect the 68th General Assembly of Prince Edward Island. It is tentatively scheduled for the fixed election date of October 4, 2027, but may be held earlier under certain circumstances.

== Election date ==
PEI's fixed election date law, passed in 2008, requires a general election to be held on the first Monday in October of the fourth calendar year following the previous general election. However, the law does not override the constitutional powers of the province's lieutenant governor to dissolve the Legislature and hold new elections at any time. Under the principles of responsible government, the lieutenant governor only calls elections on the advice of the premier or in response to the failure of a confidence vote in the Legislature. Thus it generally remains the premier's prerogative to call elections early, and premiers are often criticized for doing so for political advantage. Of PEI's four general elections held since the fixed date was passed into law, only one has been held on the fixed date; the other three were called early.

== Timeline ==
Changes in seats held (2023–present)
Seat	Before			Change			
Seat	Date	Member	Party	Reason	Date	Member	Party
Borden-Kinkora	November 11, 2023	Jamie Fox	█ PC	Resigned to run for Malpeque in the 2025 federal election	February 7, 2024	Matt MacFarlane	█ Green
Charlottetown-Hillsborough Park	February 11, 2025	Natalie Jameson	█ PC	Resigned to run for Charlottetown in the 2025 federal election	August 12, 2025	Carolyn Simpson	█ Liberal
Brackley-Hunter River	February 21, 2025	Dennis King	█ PC	Resigned; later appointed as Canada's ambassador to Ireland	August 12, 2025	Kent Dollar	█ PC
Georgetown-Pownal	October 3, 2025	Steven Myers	█ PC	Resigned	December 8, 2025	Brendan Curran	█ PC
Cornwall-Meadowbank	March 17, 2026	Mark McLane	█ PC	Died in office	July 13, 2026	Tayte Willows	█ Green
Evangeline-Miscouche	March 29, 2026	Gilles Arsenault	█ PC	Removed from caucus			█ Independent

=== 2023 ===
- April 3: General election held. The Progressive Conservative Party increases their seat total from 15 to 22 in the 27-seat Legislature, gaining 6 seats from the Green Party and 1 from the Liberal Party. The Liberals form the Official Opposition, replacing the Greens. Voter turnout of 68.5% is the province's lowest for a general election since records began in 1966.
- April 6: Sharon Cameron resigns as Liberal leader.
- April 12: Tignish-Palmer Road MLA Hal Perry is named interim Liberal leader and becomes Leader of the Official Opposition.
- June 17: Green Party leader Peter Bevan-Baker announces his intention to resign as leader.
- July 21: Charlottetown-Victoria Park MLA Karla Bernard is appointed interim Green Party leader.
- November 11: Borden-Kinkora MLA Jamie Fox resigns to run as Malpeque's Conservative candidate in the 2025 Canadian federal election.

=== 2024 ===
- February 5: The Borden-Kinkora provincial by-election was scheduled to be held this date but was pushed to February 7 due to a winter storm.
- February 7: Green candidate Matt MacFarlane wins the Borden-Kinkora provincial by-election, gaining the seat from the Progressive Conservatives.

=== 2025 ===
- February 11: Charlottetown-Hillsborough Park MLA Natalie Jameson resigns to run as Charlottetown's Conservative candidate in the 2025 Canadian federal election.
- February 20: Dennis King announces his resignation as premier, as leader of the Progressive Conservative Party, and as Brackley-Hunter River MLA, all effective February 21. This triggers a leadership election within the PC Party.
- February 21: Rob Lantz is appointed the 34th premier of Prince Edward Island.
- June 7: Matt MacFarlane is elected leader of the Green Party.
- August 12: Liberal candidate Carolyn Simpson wins the Charlottetown-Hillsborough Park by-election, gaining the seat from the Progressive Conservatives. Progressive Conservative candidate Kent Dollar wins the Brackley-Hunter River by-election, holding the seat for the party.
- October 3: Georgetown-Pownal MLA Steven Myers resigns.
- October 4: Robert Mitchell is elected leader of the Liberal Party.
- December 8: Progressive Conservative candidate Brendan Curran wins the Georgetown-Pownal by-election, holding the seat for the party.
- December 12: Rob Lantz resigns as premier and interim leader of the PCs, to run in the 2026 Progressive Conservative Party of Prince Edward Island leadership election. Deputy Premier Bloyce Thompson is appointed premier and assumes the interim leadership of the PCs.

=== 2026 ===
- February 7: Rob Lantz is elected leader of the Progressive Conservative Party.
- February 7: Thomas Burleigh is elected leader of the New Democratic Party.
- February 9: Bloyce Thompson resigns as premier. Rob Lantz is appointed as his successor.
- March 17: Cornwall-Meadowbank MLA Mark McLane dies.
- March 29: PC MLA Gilles Arsenault is removed from cabinet and becomes an independent in Evangeline-Miscouche.
- July 13: Green candidate Tayte Willows wins the Cornwall-Meadowbank provincial by-election, gaining the seat from the Progressive Conservatives.
- July 16: Robert Mitchell resigns as leader of the Liberal Party, with Hal Perry appointed as interim leader.
- October 25: Dan Kutcher is acclaimed leader of the Liberal Party.
- November 20: An attempt by Progressive Conservative party members to hold a leadership review is rejected, due to the party's constitution specifying that such reviews can only be held after the party is defeated in a general election.

== Opinion polling ==
The following is a list of scientific opinion polls of published voter intentions.

Polling firm	Date(s) conducted	Link	PC	Green	Liberal	NDP	Island	Others	Sample size	Lead
Narrative Research	September 16–28, 2026		20	46	24	9	—	—	150	22
Narrative Research	June 10–17, 2026		18	54	26	3	—	—	147	28
MQO Research	April 18–23, 2026		30	26	36	8	—	0	443	6
Narrative Research	March 6–11, 2026		25	41	26	7	—	—	176	15
Narrative Research	August 7–29, 2025		39	18	38	5	—	—	—	1
Canadian Election Study	April 29–May 13, 2025		31	22	42	3	—	1	45	11
Narrative Research	November 6–19, 2024		48	24	19	8	1	0	300	24
Narrative Research	August 5–16, 2024		45	32	22	2	0	0	300	13
Narrative Research	May 8–29, 2024		42	33	15	7	1	0	300	9
Narrative Research	February 8–13, 2024		51	28	12	9	1	0	300	23
Narrative Research	November 8–26, 2023		56	18	17	6	1	2	300	38
Narrative Research	August 2–15, 2023		53	22	18	6	1	1	300	31
Narrative Research	May 4–13, 2023		52	25	16	5	1	0	300	27
General election results	April 3, 2023		55.9	21.6	17.2	4.5	0.6	0.3	74,792	34.3
