= Executive Council of Prince Edward Island =

The Executive Council of Prince Edward Island (informally and more commonly, the Cabinet of Prince Edward Island) is the cabinet of that Canadian province.

Almost always made up of members of the Legislative Assembly of Prince Edward Island, the Cabinet is similar in structure and role to the Cabinet of Canada while being smaller in size. As federal and provincial responsibilities differ there are a number of different portfolios between the federal and provincial governments.

The Lieutenant-Governor of Prince Edward Island, as representative of the King in Right of Prince Edward Island, heads the council, and is referred to as the Governor-in-Council. Other members of the Cabinet, who advise, or minister, the vice-regal, are selected by the Premier of Prince Edward Island and appointed by the Lieutenant-Governor. Most cabinet ministers are the head of a ministry, but this is not always the case.

== Current Council ==
The current Executive Council membership, as of September 2, 2026.

Lieutenant-Governor
His Honour The Honourable Wassim Salamoun	(2024–present)
Portfolio	Minister
Premier of Prince Edward Island President of the Executive council Minister Responsible for Intergovernmental Affairs; Minister Responsible for Indigenous Relations	Rob Lantz
Deputy Premier of Prince Edward Island	Vacant
Minister of Justice and Public Safety; Attorney General Minister of Transportation and Infrastructure	Bloyce Thompson
Minister of Education and Early years	Robin Croucher
Minister of Fisheries, Rural Development and Tourism	Ernie Hudson
Minister of Land and Environment	Darlene Compton
Minister of Health and Wellness	Cory Deagle
Minister of Finance, Affordability, and Energy	Jill Burridge
Minister of Social Development and Seniors	Barb Ramsay
Minister of Economic Development, Trade, and Artificial Intelligence; Minister Responsible for Acadian and Francophone Affairs	Zack Bell
Minister of Workforce and Advanced Learning; Minister Responsible for the Status of Women	Jenn Redmond
Minister of Housing and Communities	Kent Dollar
Minister of Agriculture	Hilton MacLennan
