= Premier (Canada) =

Head of government of a Canadian province or territory

In Canada, a premier (/ˈpriːmjər/ PREEM-yər) is the head of government of a province or territory. Though the word is merely a synonym for prime minister, it is employed for provincial prime ministers to differentiate them from the prime minister of Canada. There are ten provincial premiers and three territorial premiers. In most provinces and all territories, these persons are styled the Honourable only while in office, unless they are admitted to the King's Privy Council for Canada, in which case they retain the title even after leaving the premiership. In Nova Scotia, Saskatchewan, Alberta and Ontario, former premiers are honorary members of the provincial Executive Council and thereby retain the style the Honourable for life.

The prime minister–premier distinction does not exist in French, with both federal and provincial first ministers being styled premier ministre (masculine) or première ministre (feminine).

== Name ==
In a number of provinces, premiers were previously known by the title prime minister, with premier being an informal term used to apply to all prime ministers, even the prime minister of Canada. This practice was eventually phased out to avoid confusing the provincial leaders with the federal prime minister, as well as to indicate the distinct nature of the provincial offices. The last such case outside Quebec was that of W. A. C. Bennett, who served as premier of British Columbia and styled himself as prime minister until leaving office in 1972. The title premier is typically not granted by written law. The formal name of the government position held by the premier is "president of the Executive Council" or some similar term, but that formal term is rarely used, not even in the shortened form president of the Council.

The French language does not make a distinction between premier, prime minister and first minister, which are all rendered as "premier ministre". Thus, "The prime minister of Canada and the premier of Ontario" will be translated as "Le premier ministre du Canada et le premier ministre de l'Ontario".

The terms prime minister and premier come from the United Kingdom, where there is only one prime minister / premier. Heads of government of constituent countries in the UK are titled first minister, although this position was only introduced recently with the establishment of devolution in the United Kingdom in the 1990s. Collectively, Canada's federal prime minister and the premiers are collectively referred to as first ministers, another synonym of British origin.

== Role ==
Under Canada's system of responsible government, the premier is both a member of the provincial legislative assembly and the head of the executive. The premier normally holds a seat in the legislative assembly, being elected in one of the electoral constituencies of the province. The leader of the party which commands a majority in the assembly is then legally appointed the premier by the lieutenant governor, representing the Canadian monarch in right of the province. While most often the leader of the largest party in a provincial or territorial legislature is invited to become premier, this is not always the case, the most recent exception occurring after the 2021 general election in Yukon.

Premiers advise the lieutenant governor on whom to appoint to the cabinet and they guide legislation through the legislature. Premiers thus exercise a significant amount of power within the Canadian federation, especially in regard to the federal government. In many ways they remain the most effective representatives of provincial interests to the federal government, as parliament's strong party discipline and other factors have impaired provincial representation there. This reality is acknowledged in annual "first ministers conferences" in which the federal prime minister and the 10 premiers meet to discuss provincial-federal relations. The Meech Lake Accord proposed that these meetings be constitutionally mandated, and some premiers have even proposed that these meetings become a formal branch of government, active in the legislative process (see Council of the Federation). However, only one Canadian provincial premier has ever gone on to serve as prime minister: John Thompson. Canada's first and sixth prime ministers (John A. Macdonald and Charles Tupper) had also been co-premier and premier of British provinces that became part of Canada, but no one who has led a victorious general election campaign in a Canadian province has ever been prime minister.

Canada's three territories have premiers as well, though they are technically known as "government leaders". The premier of Yukon is chosen in the usual fashion, but the premiers of Nunavut and Northwest Territories are selected from within the small and non-partisan elected territorial councils.

== Current premiers ==
List of current Canadian premiers by incumbency
Portrait	First minister	Jurisdiction	Order	Party	Incumbency	First mandate began	Current mandate began	Parl.	Ref.
	Scott Moe	Saskatchewan	15th	Saskatchewan Party	8 years, 293 days	2018 party leadership election	2024 general election	30th	
	Doug Ford	Ontario	26th	Progressive Conservative	8 years, 146 days	2018 general election	2025 general election	44th	
	Tim Houston	Nova Scotia	30th	Progressive Conservative	5 years, 83 days	2021 general election	2024 general election	65th	
	Danielle Smith	Alberta	19th	United Conservative Party	4 years, 42 days	2022 party leadership election	2023 general election	31st	
	Wab Kinew	Manitoba	25th	New Democratic	3 years, 35 days	2023 general election		43rd	
	R. J. Simpson	Northwest Territories	14th	None (consensus government)	2 years, 349 days	2023 leadership forum		20th	
	Susan Holt	New Brunswick	35th	Liberal	2 years, 20 days	2024 general election		61st	
	Tony Wakeham	Newfoundland and Labrador	16th	Progressive Conservative	1 year, 24 days	2025 general election		51st	
	John Main	Nunavut	7th	None (consensus government)	1 year, 2 days	2025 leadership forum		7th	
	Currie Dixon	Yukon	12th	Yukon Party	1 year, 0 days	2025 general election		36th	
	Rob Lantz	Prince Edward Island	34th	Progressive Conservative	286 days	2026 party leadership election		67th	
	Paul St-Pierre Plamondon	Quebec	34th	Parti Québécois	32 days	2026 general election		44th	
	Lorne Doerkson	British Columbia	38th	Conservative	2 days	2026 general election	44th		

== See also ==
- Premiers of the Australian states
- Governor (United States) (the head of government in the states of the United States)
- Deputy Premier (Canada)
