= 2025 Prince Edward Island Liberal Party leadership election =

Prince Edward Island Liberal Party leadership election

- September 29–October 4, 2025
Candidate	Robert Mitchell	Todd Cormier
Results	2,372 (82.3%)	509 (17.6%)
Leader before election
Hal Perry (interim)
Leader after election
Robert Mitchell

2025 Prince Edward Island Liberal Party leadership election
- Date: October 4, 2025
- Convention: Delta Hotels Prince Edward, Charlottetown
- Resigning leader: Sharon Cameron
- Won by: Robert Mitchell
- Candidates: 2
- Entrance fee: $22,500
- Spending limit: $50,000

The 2025 Prince Edward Island Liberal Party leadership election took place on October 4, 2025, to elect a new leader of the Prince Edward Island Liberal Party.

== Background ==
The contest was prompted by the resignation of Sharon Cameron, who stepped down after the party's poor showing in the 2023 general election.

It was the first leadership election of the party with more than one candidate since 2003.

== Rules and procedures ==
All current Liberal Party members who registered before 27 September 2025 were eligible to vote. Membership is valid for two years and costs $10.

Due to the September 2025 Canada Post labour dispute, the Prince Edward Island Liberal Party adjusted the voting process for its 2025 leadership convention. Registered party members voted using an electronic system operated by Intelivote Inc., a Nova Scotia-based company. It was the first time the party used an online voting system in its history.

Voter information was originally scheduled to be mailed on September 29, 2025, but most members received it on September 26. Members without an email address were contacted directly by phone by Intelivote to provide voting instructions.

Voting was open from 9 a.m. on September 29 until 5 p.m. on October 4, 2025. Assisted voting was available beginning at noon on October 4 at the Delta Hotels Prince Edward for members who did not receive their voter information or required assistance.

The Prince Edward Island Liberal Party required prospective candidates to meet specific fundraising thresholds to enter and compete in leadership or electoral races. Individuals seeking nomination initially raise $7,500 to qualify as a candidate. During the course of the campaign, candidates were expected to raise an additional $15,000, 50% of which is reimbursable as eligible campaign expenses. These measures were designed to ensure candidates demonstrate both financial commitment and organizational support before participating in party contests.

The spending limit was set at $50,000 per leadership candidate campaign.

== Timeline ==
- April 6, 2023 – Sharon Cameron resigns as leader of the Liberal Party. Hal Perry is selected as interim leader 6 days later.
- July 4, 2025 – Deadline for candidates to apply & deposit 1 due ($7,500)
- July 11, 2025 - Deadline for Green Light Committee Approval
- August 24, 2025 - Deposit #2 due ($7,500)
- September 10, 2025 - Leadership Roundtable 1
- September 11, 2025 - Leadership Roundtable 2
- September 11, 2025 - Deposit #3 due ($7,500)
- September 17, 2025 - Leadership Roundtable 3
- September 18, 2025 - Leadership Roundtable 4
- September 27, 2025 - Membership Registration Cutoff
- September 29, 2025 - Voting Opens
- October 4, 2025 - Convention Day & Voting Closes

== Candidates ==
=== Todd Cormier ===
- Experience: founder and former owner of Eastern Fabricators in Georgetown
Endorsements of Todd Cormier

Miscellaneous

- Lorie Kane, Professional Golfer

=== Robert Mitchell ===
- Experience: interim party leader (2019); Minister of Health and Wellness (2018–2019), Minister of Communities, Land and Environment (2015–2018); MLA for Charlottetown-Sherwood (2007–2019), MLA for Charlottetown-Winsloe (2019–2020)
Endorsements of Robert Mitchell

Federal politicians

- Sean Casey, Member of Parliament for Charlottetown

Provincial politicians

- Hal Perry, Interim Liberal Leader, Leader of the Opposition, and MLA for Tignish-Palmer Road
- Robert Henderson, Opposition Whip, and MLA for O'Leary-Inverness
- Gordon McNeilly, Opposition House Leader, and MLA for Charlottetown-West Royalty
- Carolyn Simpson, MLA for Charlottetown-Hillsborough Park
- Iain Rankin, Former Premier of Nova Scotia, and MLA for Timberlea-Prospect

Former Provincial politicians

- Francis (Buck) Watts, Former MLA for Tracadie-Hillsborough Park and Speaker of the Legislative Assembly
- Gerard Greenan, Former MLA for Summerside-St. Eleanors and Minister of Education & Attorney General
- Tina Mundy, Former MLA for Summerside-St. Eleanors and Minister of Family and Human Services
- Robert Maddix, Former MLA for Evangeline-Miscouche
- Kathleen Casey, Former MLA for Charlottetown-Lewis Point, and Speaker of the Legislative Assembly
- Bush Dumville, Former MLA for West Royalty-Springvale
- Chris Palmer, Former MLA for Summerside-Wilmot and Minister of Economic Development and Tourism
- Richard Brown, Former MLA for Charlottetown-Victoria Park and Minister of Communities, Land and Environment
- Alan McIsaac, Former MLA for Vernon River-Stratford and Minister of Agriculture and Fisheries
- Sonny Gallant, Former MLA for Evangeline-Miscouche, Interim Liberal Leader, and Minister of Workforce and Advanced Learning

== Campaign ==
Mitchell emphasized his experience in government and the stability he would bring to the party.

Cormier has been a member of the party for years but admitted to not even having voted in past elections. He stated that the state of health care, education, and the province's finances motivated him to run for party leadership, presenting himself as the change candidate.

== Results ==
Robert Mitchell won the election.

	First Ballot	
Candidate	Votes	Share
Robert Mitchell	2,372	82.3%
Todd Cormier	509	17.6%
Totals	2,882	100.0%

The following table shows the voter turnout for the three days of the event. Due to online voting, most votes were cast before the convention.

Turnout	Value
Day 1	26%
Day 2	
Day 3	66.3%
Day 4	72.8%
Day 5	85.5%
Final	90.3%
