= Robert Mitchell (Prince Edward Island politician) =

Canadian politician (born 1963)

Leader of the Prince Edward Island Liberal Party
- In office October 4, 2025 – July 16, 2026
- Preceded by: Hal Perry (interim)
- Succeeded by: Hal Perry (interim)
- Interim leader May 8, 2019 – September 9, 2019
- Preceded by: Wade MacLauchlan
- Succeeded by: Sonny Gallant (interim)

Member of the Legislative Assembly of Prince Edward Island
- In office June 12, 2007 – September 3, 2020
- Preceded by: Chester Gillan
- Succeeded by: Zack Bell
- Constituency: Charlottetown-Sherwood (2007–2019); Charlottetown-Winsloe (2019–2020)

Dean of the Legislative Assembly of Prince Edward Island
- In office March 26, 2019 – September 3, 2020 Serving with Sonny Gallant; Robert Henderson
- Preceded by: Richard Brown

Personal details
- Born: May 13, 1963 (age 63) Sherwood, Prince Edward Island, Canada
- Party: Liberal
- Occupation: Politician, Lineman

Robert Mitchell (born 13 May 1963) is a Canadian politician who served as leader of the Prince Edward Island Liberal Party from 2025 to 2026, previously serving as its interim leader in 2019. Mitchell was elected to the Legislative Assembly of Prince Edward Island in the 2007 provincial election representing a district in Charlottetown until 2020.

== Political career ==
On May 20, 2015, Mitchell was appointed to the Executive Council of Prince Edward Island as Minister of Communities, Land and Environment. On January 10, 2018, Mitchell was moved to Minister of Health and Wellness in a cabinet shuffle.

From May 8 to September 9, 2019, he served as interim leader of the Liberal Party on Prince Edward Island.

On September 3, 2020, he stepped down from his political position as MLA for Charlottetown-Winsloe, after serving in the provincial legislature for thirteen years in both districts.

On May 14, 2025, Mitchell announced his bid for the party's leadership, winning the position on October 3, defeating Todd Cormier. Mitchell was a candidate in the 2025 Georgetown-Pownal provincial by-election, which he lost to the Progressive Conservative candidate, Brendan Curran. He again sought election to the provincial legislature in 2026, running in the Cornwall-Meadowbank provincial by-election. He was defeated by Green candidate Tayte Willows. Following his consecutive defeats, Mitchell announced on July 15 that he would be resigning from the party leadership effective the next day. Hal Perry was selected by caucus to continue to serve as leader of the Official Opposition, and confirmed by the party executive to serve as interim leader.

== Electoral history ==
Prince Edward Island provincial by-election, July 13, 2026: Cornwall-Meadowbank Death of Mark McLane
Party	Candidate	Votes	%	±%
Green	Tayte Willows	1,184	39.65	+15.40
Liberal	Robert Mitchell	955	31.98	+12.86
Progressive Conservative	Caley McDonald	823	27.56	–27.19
New Democratic	Craig Nash	24	0.80	–1.07
Total valid votes		2,986	99.87	
Total rejected ballots		4	0.13	–0.37
Turnout		2,990	60.87	–7.62
Eligible voters		4,912		
Green gain from Progressive Conservative		Swing		+21.30
Source: Elections PEI

Prince Edward Island provincial by-election, December 8, 2025: Georgetown-Pownal Resignation of Steven Myers
Party	Candidate	Votes	%	±%
Progressive Conservative	Brendan Curran	986	46.86	-22.93
Liberal	Robert Mitchell	881	41.87	+29.7
Green	Eddie Childs	200	9.51	-3
New Democratic	Kevin Trainor	40	1.90	+0.9
Total valid votes		2,104		
Total rejected ballots				
Turnout		2,104	54.04	
Eligible voters		3,893		
Progressive Conservative hold		Swing		

2019 Prince Edward Island general election
Party	Candidate	Votes	%	±%
Liberal	Robert Mitchell	1,420	41.97	-1.1
Green	Amanda Morrison	1,057	31.24	+21.5
Progressive Conservative	Mike Gillis	865	25.57	-8.6
New Democratic	Jesse Reddin Cousins	41	1.21	-11.8
Total valid votes		3,383	99.79	
Total rejected ballots		7	0.21	
Turnout		3,390	80.47	
Eligible voters		4,213		
This was a newly created district
Source: Elections Prince Edward Island

2015 Prince Edward Island general election
Party	Candidate	Votes	%	±%
Liberal	Robert Mitchell	1,425	45.81	-8.12
Progressive Conservative	Mike Gillis	1,031	33.14	-4.03
New Democratic	Karalee McAskill	360	11.57	+7.12
Green	Mitchell Gallant	295	9.48	+5.03
Total valid votes		3,111	100.0	
Liberal hold		Swing		-2.04

2011 Prince Edward Island general election
Party	Candidate	Votes	%	±%
Liberal	Robert Mitchell	1,538	53.93	-0.85
Progressive Conservative	Mike Gillis	1,060	37.17	-2.67
New Democratic	Kat Murphy	127	4.45	+1.73
Green	Sarah Jones	127	4.45	+1.79
Total valid votes		2,852	100.0	
Liberal hold		Swing		+0.91

2007 Prince Edward Island general election
Party	Candidate	Votes	%	±%
Liberal	Robert Mitchell	1,712	54.78	+19.42
Progressive Conservative	Chester Gillan	1,245	39.84	-21.73
New Democratic	Brian Pollard	85	2.72	-0.35
Green	Kat Murphy	83	2.66	
Total valid votes		3,125	100.0	
This was a newly created district
Liberal gain from Progressive Conservative		Swing		+20.57
