= 2015 Progressive Conservative Party of Prince Edward Island leadership election =

Canadian provincial political party election

- Date: February 28, 2015
- Convention: Charlottetown
- Resigning leader: Olive Crane
- Won by: Rob Lantz
- Ballots: 2
- Candidates: 3
- Entrance fee: $10,000

The Progressive Conservative Party of Prince Edward Island, Canada selected a new leader on February 28, 2015, to replace Olive Crane who resigned on January 31, 2013. The Progressive Conservatives have been the Official Opposition in the Legislative Assembly of Prince Edward Island since June 12, 2007, having lost the 2007 and 2011 provincial elections to the Liberals. The interim leader was Steven Myers.

The party used a preferential ballot for its leadership convention for the first time. Voting also occurred at satellite voting sites in Bloomfield, Summerside, Souris and Montague.

The election was won by former Charlottetown City Councillor Rob Lantz on the second ballot. The party executive decided prior to voting not to release vote totals in the interests of party unity; however it was later reported that Compton was eliminated after the first ballot and that Lantz then narrowly defeated Aylward on the second ballot. Lantz would go on to win the 2026 leadership election and return as leader.

== Nomination rules ==
The nomination period opened on December 1, 2014. To be nominated, a candidate had to obtain 100 signatures from party members living in 14 of the 27 Island districts and pay an entry fee of $10,000. The deadline for nominations was January 23, 2015.

== Declared candidates ==
=== James Aylward ===
MLA for Stratford-Kinlock (2011–2019)

Date candidacy declared: December 8, 2014
Supporters
Support from caucus members: Steven Myers (Georgetown-St. Peters), Colin LaVie (Souris-Elmira)
Support from former caucus member: Chester Gillan (Parkdale-Belvedere 1996-2007); Gordie Lank (2nd Queens 1979-1986) Minister of Community and Cultural Affairs (1982-1983), Minister of Transportation and Public Works (1983-1985), Minister of Finance and Tourism (1985-1986); Pat Mella (3rd Queens 1993-1996 and Glen Stewart-Bellevue Cove 1996-2003), PC Leader (1990-1996), Minister of Finance (1996-2003)
Support from federal caucus members:
Other prominent supporters: Jamie Fox, business owner and former police chief, ran third in the 2010 leadership election.
Policies

=== Darlene Compton ===
Businesswoman, head of operations at the Dr. John M. Gillis Memorial Lodge, one of the largest private sector long-term care facilities in PEI, candidate in 2011 provincial election (Belfast-Murray River), lost to incumbent by eight votes.

Date candidacy declared: December 10, 2014
Supporters
Support from caucus members:
Support from former caucus members:
Support from federal caucus members:
Other prominent supporters:
Policies

=== Rob Lantz ===
Former Charlottetown City Councillor (2006–2014).

Date candidacy declared: December 11, 2014
Supporters
Support from caucus members:
Support from former caucus members: Philip Brown, (Cascumpec-Grand River 2000-2007), former Tourism minister (2003-2007)
Support from federal caucus members:
Other prominent supporters: Stu MacFadyen, Deputy Mayor of Charlottetown; Margaret-Ann Walsh, lawyer
Policies

== Declined ==
- Jamie Fox, business owner and former police chief, ran third in the 2010 leadership election.
- Martie Murphy, businesswoman

== Results ==
Voting was conducted by preferential ballot in which voters ranked their preferences. A candidate was required to win 50% + 1 of the votes cast. As no candidate achieved a majority on the first ballot, the lowest placed candidate was dropped and the second choice listed on those candidates ballots were added to the vote totals of the remaining two candidates in order to determine a winner.

First ballot:

- Rob Lantz
- James Aylward
- Darlene Compton

No candidate received more than 50% of the vote after the first count; Compton eliminated

Second Ballot:

- Rob Lantz
- James Aylward

Lantz had a majority of the vote on the second count and was declared the winner

2,954 votes were cast. Vote counts were not released.

== See also ==
- Progressive Conservative Party of Prince Edward Island leadership elections
