= List of Prince Edward Island provincial electoral districts =

This is a list of electoral districts in the Canadian province of Prince Edward Island.

== Current districts ==
The following 27 districts had been contested in the 2019 Prince Edward Island general election. Each is represented by one seat in the 66th General Assembly of Prince Edward Island.

=== Cardigan ===
Electoral district	No.	Eligible voters (2017)	Former district (2015)
Souris-Elmira	1	3582	same
Georgetown-Pownal	2	3644	Georgetown-St. Peters
Montague-Kilmuir	3	3571	same
Belfast-Murray River	4	3509	same
Mermaid-Stratford	5	3597	Vernon River-Stratford
Stratford-Keppoch	6	3593	Stratford-Kinlock
Morell-Donagh	7	3690	Morell-Mermaid

=== Charlottetown ===
Electoral district	No.	Eligible voters (2017)	Former district (2015)
Stanhope-Marshfield	8	3577	parts of Tracadie-Hillsborough Park and York-Oyster Bed
Charlottetown-Hillsborough Park	9	3898	parts of Tracadie-Hillsborough Park and York-Oyster Bed
Charlottetown-Winsloe	10	4028	parts of Charlottetown-Sherwood and York-Oyster Bed
Charlottetown-Belvedere	11	3972	Charlottetown-Parkdale
Charlottetown-Victoria Park	12	4019	same
Charlottetown-Brighton	13	4014	same
Charlottetown-West Royalty	14	4032	Charlottetown-Lewis Point, parts of West Royalty-Springvale
Brackley-Hunter River	15	3609	parts of York-Oyster Bed and West Royalty-Springvale

=== Malpeque ===
Electoral district	No.	Eligible voters (2017)	Former district (2015)
Cornwall-Meadowbank	16	3853	same
New Haven-Rocky Point	17	3719	Kellys Cross-Cumberland
Rustico-Emerald	18	3794	same
Borden-Kinkora	19	3718	same
Kensington-Malpeque	20	3890	same

=== Egmont ===
Electoral district	No.	Eligible voters (2017)	Former district (2015)
Summerside-Wilmot	21	4048	same
Summerside-South Drive	22	4044	Summerside-St. Eleanors
Tyne Valley-Sherbrooke	23	3613	Tyne Valley-Linkletter
Evangeline-Miscouche	24	2925	same
O'Leary-Inverness	25	3353	same
Alberton-Bloomfield	26	3346	Alberton-Roseville
Tignish-Palmer Road	27	3367	same

== Former districts ==
From Prince Edward Island joining Confederation in 1873 until 1996, the following districts were represented in the General Assembly, with each district electing two members.

Prince County

- 1st Prince
- 2nd Prince
- 3rd Prince
- 4th Prince
- 5th Prince

Queens County

- 1st Queens
- 2nd Queens
- 3rd Queens
- 4th Queens
- 5th Queens
- 6th Queens

Kings County

- 1st Kings
- 2nd Kings
- 3rd Kings
- 4th Kings
- 5th Kings

== Representation history by community ==
=== Kings County ===
Community	1966–1996	1996–2007	2007–2019	2019–present
Souris	1st Kings	Souris-Elmira	Souris-Elmira	Souris-Elmira
Elmira	1st Kings	Souris-Elmira	Souris-Elmira	Souris-Elmira
Fortune Bay	1st Kings	Morell-Fortune Bay	Souris-Elmira	Souris-Elmira
Morell	2nd Kings	Morell-Fortune Bay	Morell-Mermaid	Morell-Donagh
St. Peters	2nd Kings	Morell-Fortune Bay	Georgetown-St. Peters	Morell-Donagh
Baldwin's Road	3rd Kings	Georgetown-Baldwin's Road	Georgetown-St. Peters	Georgetown-Pownal
Montague	3rd Kings	Montague-Kilmuir	Montague-Kilmuir	Montague-Kilmuir
Kilmuir	4th Kings	Montague-Kilmuir	Montague-Kilmuir	Montague-Kilmuir
Murray River	4th Kings	Murray River-Gaspereaux	Belfast-Murray River	Belfast-Murray River
Gaspereaux	5th Kings	Murray River-Gaspereaux	Montague-Kilmuir	Montague-Kilmuir
Georgetown	5th Kings	Georgetown-Baldwin's Road	Georgetown-St. Peters	Georgetown-Pownal

=== Queens County ===
Community	1966–1996	1996–2007	2007–2019	2019–present
Park Corner	1st Queens	Park Corner-Oyster Bed	Kensington-Malpeque	Kensington-Malpeque
Emerald	1st Queens	Crapaud-Hazel Grove	Rustico-Emerald	Rustico-Emerald
Hazel Grove	1st Queens	Crapaud-Hazel Grove	Rustico-Emerald	Rustico-Emerald
Crapaud	1st Queens	Crapaud-Hazel Grove	Kellys Cross-Cumberland	Borden-Kinkora
Kellys Cross	1st Queens	Crapaud-Hazel Grove	Kellys Cross-Cumberland	Borden-Kinkora
New Haven	2nd Queens	Crapaud-Hazel Grove	Kellys Cross-Cumberland	New Haven-Rocky Point
Cumberland	2nd Queens	North River-Rice Point	Kellys Cross-Cumberland	New Haven-Rocky Point
Rice Point	2nd Queens	North River-Rice Point	Kellys Cross-Cumberland	New Haven-Rocky Point
Rocky Point	2nd Queens	North River-Rice Point	Kellys Cross-Cumberland	New Haven-Rocky Point
North River	2nd Queens	North River-Rice Point	Cornwall-Meadowbank	Cornwall-Meadowbank
Cornwall	2nd Queens	North River-Rice Point	Cornwall-Meadowbank	Cornwall-Meadowbank
Meadowbank	2nd Queens	North River-Rice Point	Cornwall-Meadowbank	Cornwall-Meadowbank
Rustico	2nd Queens	Park Corner-Oyster Bed	Rustico-Emerald	Rustico-Emerald
Hunter River	2nd Queens	Park Corner-Oyster Bed	Rustico-Emerald	Brackley-Hunter River
Springvale	2nd Queens	Park Corner-Oyster Bed	West Royalty-Springvale	Brackley-Hunter River
Oyster Bed	2nd Queens	Park Corner-Oyster Bed	York-Oyster Bed	Brackley-Hunter River
Brackley	3rd Queens	Stanhope-East Royalty	York-Oyster Bed	Brackley-Hunter River
York	3rd Queens	Stanhope-East Royalty	York-Oyster Bed	Stanhope-Marshfield
Stanhope	3rd Queens	Stanhope-East Royalty	York-Oyster Bed	Stanhope-Marshfield
Marshfield	3rd Queens	Stanhope-East Royalty	Tracadie-Hillsborough Park	Stanhope-Marshfield
Tacadie	3rd Queens	Tracadie-Fort Augustus	Tracadie-Hillsborough Park	Stanhope-Marshfield
Fort Augustus	3rd Queens	Tracadie-Fort Augustus	Morell-Mermaid	Morell-Donagh
Donagh	3rd Queens	Tracadie-Fort Augustus	Morell-Mermaid	Morell-Donagh
Mermaid	3rd Queens	Tracadie-Fort Augustus	Morell-Mermaid	Mermaid-Stratford
Stratford (east part)	3rd Queens	Glen Stewart-Bellevue Cove	Vernon River-Stratford	Mermaid-Stratford
Glen Stewart, Stratford	3rd Queens	Glen Stewart-Bellevue Cove	Stratford-Kinlock	Stratford-Keppoch
Kinlock, Stratford	3rd Queens	Glen Stewart-Bellevue Cove	Stratford-Kinlock	Stratford-Keppoch
Keppoch, Stratford	3rd Queens	Glen Stewart-Bellevue Cove	Stratford-Kinlock	Stratford-Keppoch
Winsloe	3rd Queens	Winsloe-West Royalty	West Royalty-Springvale	Charlottetown-Winsloe
Bellevue Cove	4th Queens	Glen Stewart-Bellevue Cove	Stratford-Kinlock	Mermaid-Stratford
Belfast	4th Queens	Belfast-Pownal Bay	Belfast-Murray River	Belfast-Murray River
Vernon River	4th Queens	Belfast-Pownal Bay	Vernon River-Stratford	Belfast-Murray River
Pownal	4th Queens	Belfast-Pownal Bay	Vernon River-Stratford	Georgetown-Pownal
East Royalty, Charlottetown	5th Queens	Stanhope-East Royalty	York-Oyster Bed	Charlottetown-Hillsborough Park
Hillsborough Park, Charlottetown	5th Queens	Sherwood-Hillsborough	Tracadie-Hillsborough Park	Charlottetown-Hillsborough Park
Sherwood, Charlottetown	5th Queens	Sherwood-Hillsborough	Charlottetown-Sherwood	Charlottetown-Belvedere
Belvedere, Charlottetown	5th Queens	Parkdale-Belvedere	Charlottetown-Parkdale	Charlottetown-Belvedere
Parkdale, Charlottetown	5th Queens	Parkdale-Belvedere	Charlottetown-Parkdale	Charlottetown-Belvedere
Kings Square, Charlottetown	5th Queens	Charlottetown-Kings Square	Charlottetown-Victoria Park	Charlottetown-Victoria Park
Victoria Park, Charlottetown	6th Queens	Charlottetown-Rochford Square	Charlottetown-Victoria Park	Charlottetown-Victoria Park
Rochford Square, Charlottetown	6th Queens	Charlottetown-Rochford Square	Charlottetown-Victoria Park	Charlottetown-Victoria Park
Brighton, Charlottetown	6th Queens	Charlottetown-Rochford Square	Charlottetown-Brighton	Charlottetown-Brighton
Spring Park, Charlottetown	6th Queens	Charlottetown-Spring Park	Charlottetown-Lewis Point	Charlottetown-Brighton
Lewis Point, Charlottetown	6th Queens	Winsloe-West Royalty	Charlottetown-Lewis Point	Charlottetown-West Royalty
West Royalty, Charlottetown	6th Queens	Winsloe-West Royalty	West Royalty-Springvale	Charlottetown-West Royalty

=== Prince County ===
Community	1966–1996	1996–2007	2007–2019	2019–present
Palmer Road	1st Prince	Tignish-DeBlois	Tignish-Palmer Road	Tignish-Palmer Road
DeBlois	1st Prince	Tignish-DeBlois	Tignish-Palmer Road	Tignish-Palmer Road
Tignish	1st Prince	Tignish-DeBlois	Tignish-Palmer Road	Tignish-Palmer Road
Miminegash	1st Prince	Alberton-Miminegash	Alberton-Roseville	Tignish-Palmer Road
Roseville	1st Prince	Alberton-Miminegash	Alberton-Roseville	Alberton-Bloomfield
Alberton	1st Prince	Alberton-Miminegash	Alberton-Roseville	Alberton-Bloomfield
Cascumpec	1st Prince	Cascumpec-Grand River	Alberton-Roseville	Alberton-Bloomfield
Bloomfield	1st Prince	West Point-Bloomfield	Alberton-Roseville	Alberton-Bloomfield
West Point	2nd Prince	West Point-Bloomfield	O'Leary-Inverness	O'Leary-Inverness
Tyne Valley	2nd Prince	Cascumpec-Grand River	Tyne Valley-Linkletter	Tyne Valley-Sherbrooke
Grand River	3rd Prince	Cascumpec-Grand River	Tyne Valley-Linkletter	Tyne Valley-Sherbrooke
Evangeline Region	3rd Prince	Evangeline-Miscouche	Evangeline-Miscouche	Evangeline-Miscouche
Miscouche	3rd Prince	Evangeline-Miscouche	Evangeline-Miscouche	Evangeline-Miscouche
Malpeque	3rd Prince	Kensington-Malpeque	Kensington-Malpeque	Kensington-Malpeque
Kensington	4th Prince	Kensington-Malpeque	Kensington-Malpeque	Kensington-Malpeque
Borden	4th Prince	Borden-Kinkora	Borden-Kinkora	Borden-Kinkora
Kinkora	4th Prince	Borden-Kinkora	Borden-Kinkora	Borden-Kinkora
Sherbrooke	4th Prince	Kensington-Malpeque	Kensington-Malpeque	Tyne Valley-Sherbrooke
St. Eleanors, Summerside	4th Prince	St. Eleanors-Summerside	Summerside-St. Eleanors	Tyne Valley-Sherbrooke
Linkletter	4th Prince	St. Eleanors-Summerside	Tyne Valley-Linkletter	Evangeline-Miscouche
South Drive, Summerside	4th Prince	St. Eleanors-Summerside	Tyne Valley-Linkletter	Summerside-South Drive
Wilmot, Summerside	4th Prince	Wilmot-Summerside	Summerside-Wilmot	Summerside-Wilmot
Summerside (east part)	5th Prince	Wilmot-Summerside	Summerside-Wilmot	Summerside-Wilmot
Summerside (west part)	5th Prince	St. Eleanors-Summerside	Summerside-St. Eleanors	Summerside-South Drive

== See also ==
- Canadian provincial electoral districts
