= 2025 Georgetown-Pownal provincial by-election =

Election in Canada

| ← 2023 | December 8, 2025 | Next → |

District of Georgetown-Pownal
- Turnout: 54.12% (▼19.18)
| | First party | Second party | Third party |
|---|---|---|---|
| Candidate | Brendan Curran | Robert Mitchell | Eddie Childs |
| Party | Progressive Conservative | Liberal | Green |
| Popular vote | 986 | 881 | 200 |
| Percentage | 46.80% | 41.81% | 9.49% |
| Swing | ▼22.99% | ▲29.71% | ▼3.03% |
MLA before election
Steven Myers
Progressive Conservative
Elected MLA
Brendan Curran
Progressive Conservative

A by-election took place on December 8, 2025, in the provincial riding of Georgetown-Pownal to elect a member of the Legislative Assembly of Prince Edward Island. It was triggered by the resignation of Steven Myers.

One of the main issues in the by-election was public confidence in the Prince Edward Island Regulatory and Appeals Commission (IRAC), with all the candidates having supported differing levels of reform. IRAC administers the province's Lands Protection Act, and its role had come under public scrutiny in the district due to the activities of large landholders, such as a couple of Buddhist institutions.

== Candidates ==
There were four candidates in the by-election:

- Brendan Curran (Progressive Conservative): Civil servant, senior adviser of issues management for Premier Rob Lantz. Lives in Peakes.
- Robert Mitchell (Liberal): Leader of the party. Former cabinet minister. Lives in Charlottetown.
- Eddie Childs (Green): Civil servant with the Department of Environment, Energy and Climate Action. Former president of the Holland College student union. Lives in Primrose.
- Kevin Trainor (NDP): Trade unionist, ran for the party in the 2023 election in Morell-Donagh. Lives in Dromore.

== Results ==
Prince Edward Island provincial by-election, December 8, 2025: Georgetown-Pownal Resignation of Steven Myers
| Party | Candidate | Votes | % | ±% |
|---|---|---|---|---|
| Progressive Conservative | Brendan Curran | 986 | 46.80 | –22.99 |
| Liberal | Robert Mitchell | 881 | 41.81 | +29.71 |
| Green | Eddie Childs | 200 | 9.49 | –3.03 |
| New Democratic | Kevin Trainor | 40 | 1.90 | –0.91 |
| Total valid votes | | 2,107 | | |
| Total rejected ballots | | | | |
| Turnout | | 2,104 | 54.12 | –19.18 |
| Eligible voters | | 3,893 | | |
| Progressive Conservative hold | | Swing | | –26.36 |

=== By poll ===
| Poll Number | Community | Childs | Curran | Mitchell | Trainor | Vote Total |
|---|---|---|---|---|---|---|
| Advance | — | 78 | 341 | 372 | 8 | 799 |
| 1 | Launching | 25 | 87 | 51 | 4 | 167 |
| 2 | Georgetown | 9 | 197 | 53 | 6 | 265 |
| 3 | Georgetown Royalty | 14 | 91 | 42 | 4 | 151 |
| 4 | Cardigan | 27 | 68 | 55 | 5 | 155 |
| 5 | Baldwin Road | 3 | 31 | 38 | 2 | 74 |
| 6 | Avondale | 8 | 53 | 62 | 0 | 123 |
| 7 | Mount Albion | 7 | 31 | 59 | 7 | 104 |
| 8 | Cherry Valley | 15 | 36 | 74 | 2 | 127 |
| 9 | Pownal | 14 | 51 | 75 | 2 | 142 |
| Total | — | 200 | 986 | 881 | 40 | 2,107 |

== Previous result ==
2023 Prince Edward Island general election: Georgetown-Pownal
| Party | Candidate | Votes | % | ±% |
|---|---|---|---|---|
| Progressive Conservative | Steven Myers | 1,961 | 69.79 | +21.15 |
| Green | Patrick Brothers | 352 | 12.53 | -15.65 |
| Liberal | Allister Veinot | 340 | 12.10 | -9.50 |
| New Democratic | Edith Perry | 79 | 2.81 | +1.22 |
| Island | Lucy Robbins | 78 | 2.78 | |
| Total valid votes | | 2,810 | 99.57 | |
| Total rejected ballots | | 12 | 0.43 | +0.17 |
| Turnout | | 2,822 | 73.30 | -8.74 |
| Eligible voters | | 3,850 | | |
| Progressive Conservative hold | | Swing | | +18.40 |

== See also ==
- List of Prince Edward Island by-elections
