= Cory Deagle =

Canadian politician

Cory Deagle MLA

Minister of Health and Wellness
- Incumbent
- Assumed office March 26, 2026
- Premier: Rob Lantz
- Preceded by: Mark McLane

Minister without Portfolio
- In office February, 2026 – March, 2026

Minister of Housing, Land, and Communities
- In office October, 2025 – February, 2026
- Preceded by: Steven Myers
- Succeeded by: Sidney MacEwen

Minister of Economic Development, Innovation, and Trade
- In office October, 2024 – February, 2025
- Preceded by: Gilles Arsenault
- Succeeded by: Jenn Redmond

Minister of Fisheries and Communities
- In office April 14, 2023 – February 26, 2025
- Premier: Dennis King
- Preceded by: Jamie Fox
- Succeeded by: Zack Bell

Minister of Transportation and Infrastructure
- In office July, 2022 – April, 2023
- Preceded by: James Aylward
- Succeeded by: Ernie Hudson

Government Whip
- In office 2019–2022
- Preceded by: Jordan Brown
- Succeeded by: Zack Bell

Member of the Legislative Assembly of Prince Edward Island for Montague-Kilmuir
- Incumbent
- Assumed office April 23, 2019
- Preceded by: Allen Roach

Personal details
- Born: June 27, 1991 (age 35)
- Party: Progressive Conservative

Cory Deagle (born June 27, 1991) is a Canadian politician, who was elected to the Legislative Assembly of Prince Edward Island in the 2019 Prince Edward Island general election. He represents the district of Montague-Kilmuir as a member of the Progressive Conservative Party of Prince Edward Island.

He was re-elected in the 2023 general election. He is also the youngest member of the legislature, at 31.

On February 26, 2025, Deagle resigned from Cabinet to run for the leadership of the Progressive Conservative Party. However, he dropped out of the race and rejoined Cabinet on October 10, 2025.

== Electoral record ==
2023 Prince Edward Island general election: Montague-Kilmuir
Party	Candidate	Votes	%	±%
Progressive Conservative	Cory Deagle	1,847	70.2	+23.8
Green	Norma Dingwell	379	14.4	–8.4
Liberal	Nick Sheppard	271	10.3	–16.2
Independent	Angela Reine Barton	58	2.2	–
New Democratic	Robert Lethbridge	38	1.4	–2.8
Island	Gary Robbins	38	1.4	–
Total valid votes		2,631	100.0	
Progressive Conservative hold		Swing		+18.0

2019 Prince Edward Island general election: Montague-Kilmuir
Party	Candidate	Votes	%	±%
Progressive Conservative	Cory Deagle	1,373	46.4	+15.4
Liberal	Daphne Griffin	785	26.5	–15.3
Green	John Allen Maclean	675	22.8	+18.6
New Democratic	Billy Cann	124	4.2	–18.9
Total valid votes		2,957	100.0	
Progressive Conservative gain from Liberal		Swing		+15.4
Source: Elections Prince Edward Island
