= Georgetown-St. Peters =

Former provincial electoral district in Prince Edward Island, Canada

Coordinates: 46.263°N 62.588°W

Prince Edward Island electoral district
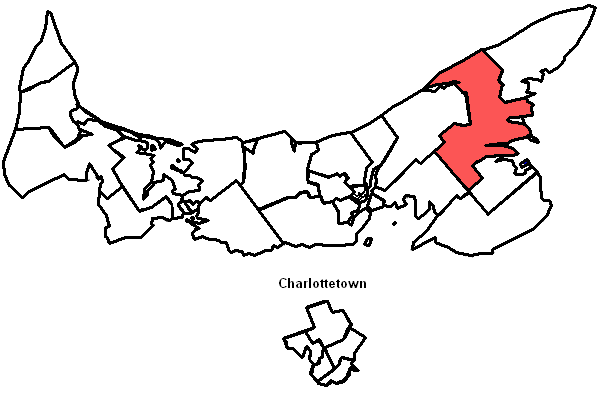

Defunct provincial electoral district
- Legislature: Legislative Assembly of Prince Edward Island
- District created: 1996
- District abolished: 2019
- First contested: 1996
- Last contested: 2015

Demographics
- Electors (2006): 3,697

Georgetown-St. Peters was a provincial electoral district for the Legislative Assembly of Prince Edward Island, Canada. It was created from mostly 3rd Kings and part of 5th Kings. The district was named Georgetown-Baldwin's Road from 1996 to 2007.

It was abolished in 2019 into Georgetown-Pownal, Montague-Kilmuir, Belfast-Murray River, Morell-Donagh, and Souris-Elmira.

== Members ==
The riding has elected the following members of the Legislative Assembly:

Members of the Legislative Assembly for Georgetown-St. Peters
Assembly	Years	Member	Party
See 1st Kings, 2nd Kings, 3rd Kings, 4th Kings, 5th Kings 1873–1996
60th	1996–2000	Mike Currie	Progressive Conservative
61st	2000–2003	Mike Currie	Progressive Conservative
62nd	2003–2007	Mike Currie	Progressive Conservative
63rd	2007–2011	Mike Currie	Progressive Conservative
64th	2011–2015	Steven Myers	Progressive Conservative
65th	2015–2019	Steven Myers	Progressive Conservative

== Election results ==
=== Georgetown-St. Peters, 2007–2019 ===
2015 Prince Edward Island general election
Party	Candidate	Votes	%	±%
Progressive Conservative	Steven Myers	1,448	47.96	-5.34
Liberal	Russ Stewart	1,170	38.75	-2.33
New Democratic	Nathan Bushey	256	8.48	+5.54
Green	Heather Gallant	145	4.80	+3.21
Total valid votes		3,019	99.67	
Total rejected ballots		10	0.33	-0.24
Turnout		3,029	84.82	+0.91
Eligible voters		3,571		
Progressive Conservative hold		Swing		-1.50

2011 Prince Edward Island general election
Party	Candidate	Votes	%	±%
Progressive Conservative	Steven Myers	1,575	53.30	+0.22
Liberal	Kevin Gotell	1,214	41.08	-2.86
New Democratic	Jane Dunphy	87	2.94	-0.03
Green	Jason Furness	47	1.59	
Island	Ray Cantelo	32	1.08	
Total valid votes		2,955	99.43	
Total rejected ballots		17	0.57	+0.16
Turnout		2,972	83.91	-4.43
Eligible voters		3,542		
Progressive Conservative hold		Swing		+1.54

2007 Prince Edward Island general election
Party	Candidate	Votes	%	±%
Progressive Conservative	Michael Currie	1,678	53.08	-8.10
Liberal	Danny Walker	1,389	43.94	+7.50
New Democratic	Jane Dunphy	94	2.97	+0.60
Total valid votes		3,161	99.59	
Total rejected ballots		13	0.41	-0.18
Turnout		3,174	88.34	-3.11
Eligible voters		3,593		
Progressive Conservative hold		Swing		-7.80

==== 2016 electoral reform plebiscite results ====
2016 Prince Edward Island electoral reform referendum
Side	Votes	%
First Past the Post	440	36.85
Mixed Member Proportional	336	28.14
Dual Member Proportional Representation	239	20.02
Preferential Voting	113	9.46
First Past the Post plus leaders	66	5.53
Two-choice preferred result
First Past the Post	570	50.71
Mixed Member Proportional	554	49.29
Total votes cast	1,194	33.01
Registered voters	3,656	
Source "Plebiscite Report" (PDF). Archived from the original (PDF) on 1 December 2017.

=== Georgetown-Baldwin's Road, 1996–2007 ===
2005 Prince Edward Island electoral reform referendum
Side	Votes	%
No	769	78.55
Yes	210	21.45

2003 Prince Edward Island general election
Party	Candidate	Votes	%	±%
Progressive Conservative	Michael Currie	1,652	61.19	-4.93
Liberal	Danny Walker	984	36.44	+6.18
New Democratic	Jane Dunphy	64	2.37	-1.25
Total valid votes		2,700	99.41	
Total rejected ballots		16	0.59	+0.41
Turnout		2,716	91.45	+0.73
Eligible voters		2,970		
Progressive Conservative hold		Swing		-5.56

2000 Prince Edward Island general election
Party	Candidate	Votes	%	±%
Progressive Conservative	Michael Currie	1,807	66.12	+11.69
Liberal	Danny Campbell	827	30.26	-13.71
New Democratic	Bruno Peripoli	99	3.62	+2.02
Total valid votes		2,733	99.82	
Total rejected ballots		5	0.18	-0.26
Turnout		2,738	90.72	-1.08
Eligible voters		3,018		
Progressive Conservative hold		Swing		+12.70

1996 Prince Edward Island general election
Party	Candidate	Votes	%
Progressive Conservative	Michael Currie	1,463	54.43
Liberal	Rose Marie MacDonald	1,182	43.97
New Democratic	Patricia Allen	43	1.60
Total valid votes		2,688	99.56
Total rejected ballots		12	0.44
Turnout		2,700	91.81
Eligible voters		2,941	
This riding was created from parts of the dual-member ridings of 3rd Kings and 5th Kings.

== See also ==
- List of Prince Edward Island provincial electoral districts
- Canadian provincial electoral districts
