= Leader of the Opposition (Prince Edward Island) =

Position in the Legislative Assembly of Prince Edward Island

- Incumbent; Hal Perry since April 12, 2023
- Official Opposition; Legislative Assembly of Prince Edward Island
- Member of: Legislative Assembly of Prince Edward Island
- Term length: While leader of the largest party not in government
- Inaugural holder: Daniel Gordon
- Formation: 1894; 132 years ago

The leader of the Opposition is the member of the Legislative Assembly (MLA) in the Legislative Assembly of Prince Edward Island that is recognized by the Speaker as the leader of the largest caucus that is not part of the government.

Green Party of Prince Edward Island
Prince Edward Island Liberal Party
Prince Edward Island Progressive Conservative Party

This list is incomplete.

#	Leader	Party	Took office	Left office
	Neil McLeod	Conservative	1891	1893
	Daniel Gordon	Conservative	1894	1903
	John A. Mathieson	Conservative	1904	1911
	John Richards	Liberal	1912	1915
	John Howatt Bell	Liberal	1915	1919
	Aubin E. Arsenault	Conservative	1919	1921
	James D. Stewart	Conservative	1921	1923
	Albert C. Saunders	Liberal	1923	1927
	James D. Stewart	Conservative	1927	1931
	Walter Lea	Liberal	1931	1935
No Official Opposition Leader 1935–1939
	William J.P. MacMillan	Progressive Conservative	1940	1950
	Reginald R. Bell	Progressive Conservative	1950	1959
	Alexander Wallace Matheson	Liberal	1959	1965
	Lorne Bonnell	Liberal	1965	1965
	Alexander B. Campbell	Liberal	1965	1966
	Walter Russell Shaw	Progressive Conservative	1966	1970
	George Dewar	Progressive Conservative	1970	1973
	Melvin McQuaid	Progressive Conservative	1973	1976
	J. Angus MacLean	Progressive Conservative	1977	1979
	William Bennett Campbell	Liberal	1979	1981
	Gilbert Clements	Liberal	1981	1982
	Joe Ghiz	Liberal	1982	1986
	Leone Bagnall	Progressive Conservative	1986	1993
	Pat Mella	Progressive Conservative	1993	1996
	Keith Milligan	Liberal	1996	1999
	Paul Connolly	Liberal	1999	2000
	Ron MacKinley	Liberal	2000	2003
	Robert Ghiz	Liberal	2003	2007
	Pat Binns	Progressive Conservative	2007	2007
	Olive Crane	Progressive Conservative	2007	2010
	Jim Bagnall	Progressive Conservative	2010	2010
	Olive Crane	Progressive Conservative	2010	2013
	Hal Perry	Progressive Conservative	2013	2013
	Steven Myers	Progressive Conservative	2013	2015
	Jamie Fox	Progressive Conservative	2015	2017
	James Aylward	Progressive Conservative	2017	2019
	Peter Bevan-Baker	Green	2019	2023
	Hal Perry	Liberal	2023	
