= Hal Perry (politician) =

Canadian politician

Hal Perry MLA

Interim Leader of the Prince Edward Island Liberal Party
- In office July 16, 2026 – October 25, 2026
- Preceded by: Robert Mitchell
- Succeeded by: Dan Kutcher
- In office April 12, 2023 – October 4, 2025
- Preceded by: Sharon Cameron
- Succeeded by: Robert Mitchell

Leader of the Opposition in Prince Edward Island
- Incumbent
- Assumed office April 12, 2023
- Preceded by: Peter Bevan-Baker
- In office January 30, 2013 – February 11, 2013
- Preceded by: Olive Crane
- Succeeded by: Steven Myers

Member of the Legislative Assembly of Prince Edward Island for Tignish-Palmer Road
- Incumbent
- Assumed office October 18, 2011
- Preceded by: Neil LeClair

Minister of Education, Early Learning, and Culture
- In office May 21, 2015 – January 7, 2016
- Preceded by: Tina Mundy
- Succeeded by: Doug Currie

Deputy Speaker
- In office June 13, 2019 – March 6, 2023
- Preceded by: Kathleen Casey
- Succeeded by: Sidney MacEwen

Personal details
- Born: John Perry; November 18, 1965 (age 60) Alberton, Prince Edward Island, Canada
- Party: Liberal (since 2013)
- Other political affiliations: Progressive Conservative (2011–2013)

John "Hal" Perry MLA (born November 18, 1965) is a Canadian politician who was elected to the Legislative Assembly of Prince Edward Island in the 2011 provincial election. He represents the district of Tignish-Palmer Road as a member of the Liberal Party. He was originally elected as a member of the Progressive Conservative Party, but left the Progressive Conservative Party and joined the Liberal Party on October 3, 2013.

== Life and career ==
He was chosen as Opposition Leader on January 30, 2013, following the resignation of Olive Crane, but resigned from that position on February 11 after losing the race for the interim leadership of the Progressive Conservatives to Steven Myers.

On May 21, 2015, Perry was appointed to the Executive Council of Prince Edward Island as Minister of Education, Early Learning and Culture, following Tina Mundy's resignation from cabinet. He was shuffled out of cabinet in January 2016.

Perry was re-elected to the legislature in the 2023 general election. He served as interim Leader of the Liberal Party from April 12, 2023, following Sharon Cameron's resignation, until October 4, 2025, upon election of Robert Mitchell as leader. He has been Opposition leader since April 2023. Following Mitchell's resignation in July 2026, he again became interim leader.

Before his election, Perry was employed as a property development officer with the PEI Department of Environment, Energy and Forestry.

Perry is a direct descendant of 19th-century Speaker of the PEI Legislature Stanislaus Francis Perry.

== Election results ==
2023 Prince Edward Island general election: Tignish-Palmer Road
Party	Candidate	Votes	%	±%
Liberal	Hal Perry	1,527	58.7	+9.4
Progressive Conservative	April Delaney	939	36.1	+7.6
New Democratic	Gail Kinch	137	5.3	+3.7
Total valid votes		2,603	100.0	
Liberal hold		Swing		+0.9

2019 Prince Edward Island general election: Tignish-Palmer Road
Party	Candidate	Votes	%	±%
Liberal	Hal Perry	1,388	49.3%	-8.93
Progressive Conservative	Melissa Handrahan	802	28.5%	-3.55
Green	Sean Doyle	584	20.7%	+14.16
New Democratic	Dale Ryan	44	1.6%	-1.57
Total valid votes		2,818	100.0	
Liberal hold		Swing		

2015 Prince Edward Island general election
Party	Candidate	Votes	%	±%
Liberal	Hal Perry	1,486	58.23	+9.49
Progressive Conservative	Joseph Profit	818	32.05	-18.01
Green	Malcolm Pitre	167	6.54	
New Democratic	John A'Hearn	81	3.17	
Total valid votes		2,552	100.0	
Liberal hold		Swing		+13.75
Liberal candidate Hal Perry gained 8.08 percentage points from his 2011 performance running as a Progressive Conservative.

2011 Prince Edward Island general election: Tignish-Palmer Road
Party	Candidate	Votes	%	±%
Progressive Conservative	Hal Perry	1,175	50.15	+5.30
Liberal	Neil LeClair	1,142	48.74	−6.41
Island	Derek D. Peters	26	1.11	
Total valid votes		2,343	100.0	
Progressive Conservative gain from Liberal		Swing		+5.86
