= Wilmot, Prince Edward Island =

Neighborhood in Summerside, Prince Edward Island

Coordinates: 46°24′0″N 63°45′13″W

Federal census population history of Wilmot
Year	Pop.	±%
1966	619	—
1971	737	+19.1%
1976	1,183	+60.5%
1981	1,563	+32.1%
1986	1,708	+9.3%
1991	2,176	+27.4%
Source: Statistics Canada

Wilmot is a neighbourhood in the Southeastern part of the Canadian city of Summerside, Prince Edward Island.

Wilmot is the home to one of Prince Edward Island's ADL Food plants, and other homes and parks like LeFurgey park.
