= Bloyce Thompson =

Prince Edward Island politician

The Honourable Bloyce Thompson MLA

35th Premier of Prince Edward Island
- In office December 12, 2025 – February 9, 2026
- Monarch: Charles III
- Lieutenant Governor: Wassim Salamoun
- Preceded by: Rob Lantz
- Succeeded by: Rob Lantz

Interim leader of the Progressive Conservative Party of Prince Edward Island
- In office December 12, 2025 – February 7, 2026
- Preceded by: Rob Lantz (interim)
- Succeeded by: Rob Lantz

3rd Deputy Premier of Prince Edward Island
- In office April 14, 2023 – December 12, 2025
- Premier: Dennis King; Rob Lantz
- Preceded by: Darlene Compton

Minister of Transportation and Infrastructure
- Incumbent
- Assumed office September 2, 2026
- Preceded by: Ernie Hudson

Minister of Agriculture
- In office April, 2023 – September 2, 2026
- Preceded by: Darlene Compton
- Succeeded by: Hilton MacLennan

Minister of Justice and Public Safety and Attorney General
- Incumbent
- Assumed office April, 2023
- Preceded by: Darlene Compton

Minister of Agriculture and Land
- In office May, 2019 – July, 2022
- Preceded by: Robert Henderson
- Succeeded by: Darlene Compton

Minister of Justice and Public Safety and Attorney General
- In office May, 2019 – July, 2022
- Preceded by: Jordan Brown
- Succeeded by: Darlene Compton

Minister of Economic Development, Tourism, and Culture
- In office July, 2022 – April, 2023
- Preceded by: Matthew MacKay
- Succeeded by: Gilles Arsenault

Member of the Legislative Assembly for Stanhope-Marshfield
- Incumbent
- Assumed office April 23, 2019
- Preceded by: Riding established

Personal details
- Party: Progressive Conservative
- Occupation: farmer

Bloyce Thompson is a Canadian politician who briefly served as the 35th premier of Prince Edward Island from 2025 to 2026. He was elected to the Legislative Assembly of Prince Edward Island in the 2019 Prince Edward Island general election. Thompson represents the district of Stanhope-Marshfield as a member of the Progressive Conservative Party of Prince Edward Island. He was re-elected in the 2023 general election.

Prior to his election to the legislature, Thompson worked as a dairy farmer.

On April 14, 2023, Thompson was appointed Deputy Premier of Prince Edward Island, by Lieutenant Governor Antoinette Perry, via the advice of Premier Dennis King.

On December 12, 2025, Thompson was sworn in as the 35th premier of Prince Edward Island, after Rob Lantz resigned to run in the 2026 Progressive Conservative Party of Prince Edward Island leadership election. After Lantz won the 2026 PC leadership election, he succeeded Thompson as premier and PC leader.

== Electoral record ==
2023 Prince Edward Island general election: Stanhope-Marshfield
Party	Candidate	Votes	%	±%
Progressive Conservative	Bloyce Thompson	2,209	79.6	+40.1
New Democratic	Marian White	566	20.4	+19.0
Total valid votes		2,775	100.0	
Progressive Conservative hold		Swing		+10.6

2019 Prince Edward Island general election: Stanhope-Marshfield
Party	Candidate	Votes	%	±%
Progressive Conservative	Bloyce Thompson	1,300	39.53	+13.4
Liberal	Wade MacLauchlan	1,196	36.36	-19.2
Green	Sarah Donald	747	22.71	+14.4
New Democratic	Marian White	46	1.40	-8.6
Total valid votes		3,289	100.00	
Progressive Conservative notional gain from Liberal		Swing		+16.3
