= Roseville, Prince Edward Island =

Coordinates: 46.821°N 64.248°W

Location of Roseville in Prince Edward Island

Roseville is a settlement on Prince Edward Island.
