= Ernie Hudson (politician) =

Canadian politician

The Honourable Ernie Hudson MLA

Member of the Legislative Assembly of Prince Edward Island for Alberton-Bloomfield
- Incumbent
- Assumed office April 23, 2019
- Preceded by: Pat Murphy

Personal details
- Party: Progressive Conservative

Ernie Hudson is a Canadian politician who was elected to the Legislative Assembly of Prince Edward Island in the 2019 Prince Edward Island general election. He represents the district of Alberton-Bloomfield as a member of the Progressive Conservative Party of Prince Edward Island.

On May 9, 2019, Hudson was appointed to the Executive Council of Prince Edward Island as Minister of Social Development and Housing.

He was re-elected in the 2023 general election.

== Electoral record ==
2023 Prince Edward Island general election: Alberton-Bloomfield
Party	Candidate	Votes	%	±%
Progressive Conservative	Ernie Hudson	1532	57.60	+12.10
Liberal	Pat Murphy	896	33.70	-10.30
Green	Ron McConnell	132	5	
New Democratic	Kester Nurse	102	3.8	+0.40
Total valid votes		2674		
Total rejected ballots		12	0.45	
Turnout		2,686		
Progressive Conservative hold		Swing		+12.10
