= Tyler DesRoches =

Canadian politician

Tyler DesRoches MLA

Government Whip
- Incumbent
- Assumed office March 25th, 2025
- Preceded by: Brad Trivers

Member of the Legislative Assembly of Prince Edward Island for Summerside-Wilmot
- Incumbent
- Assumed office April 3, 2023
- Preceded by: Lynne Lund

Personal details
- Party: Progressive Conservative

Tyler DesRoches is a Canadian politician who was elected to the Legislative Assembly of Prince Edward Island in the 2023 provincial election. DesRoches represents Summerside-Wilmot as a Progressive Conservative.

== Electoral record ==
2023 Prince Edward Island general election: Summerside-Wilmot
Party	Candidate	Votes	%	±%
Progressive Conservative	Tyler Desroches	1,651	56.70	+24.60
Green	Lynne Lund	981	33.70	+21.07
Liberal	Don Reid	214	7.40	-15.30
New Democratic	Cassie MacKay	45	1.50	+0.3
Total valid votes		2910		
Total rejected ballots		10	0.30	
Turnout		2,920		
Progressive Conservative gain		Swing		+24.60
