= Zack Bell =

Canadian politician

The Honourable Zack Bell MLA

Member of the Legislative Assembly of Prince Edward Island for Charlottetown-Winsloe
- Incumbent
- Assumed office November 2, 2020
- Preceded by: Robert Mitchell

Minister of Economic Development, Trade, and Artificial Intelligence
- Incumbent
- Assumed office September 2, 2026
- Preceded by: Jenn Redmond

Minister of Workforce and Advanced Learning
- In office February, 2026 – September 2, 2026
- Preceded by: Jenn Redmond
- Succeeded by: Jenn Redmond

Minister responsible for Acadian and Francophone Affairs
- Incumbent
- Assumed office February, 2026
- Preceded by: Gilles Arsenault

Minister of Fisheries, Tourism, Sport and Culture
- Incumbent
- Assumed office October 9, 2024
- Preceded by: Cory Deagle
- Succeeded by: Ernie Hudson

Government Whip
- In office July 15, 2022 – October, 2024
- Preceded by: Cory Deagle
- Succeeded by: Brad Trivers

Personal details
- Party: Progressive Conservative

Zack Bell is a Canadian politician, who was elected to the Legislative Assembly of Prince Edward Island in a by-election on November 2, 2020. He represents the district of Charlottetown-Winsloe as a member of the Progressive Conservative Party of Prince Edward Island.

His victory lifted the government of Dennis King from minority to majority status.

He was re-elected to the legislature in the 2023 general election.

== Electoral record ==
2023 Prince Edward Island general election: Charlottetown-Winsloe
Party	Candidate	Votes	%	±%
Progressive Conservative	Zack Bell	1,861	60.60	+35.0
Green	Charles Sanderson	553	18.0	-13.20
Liberal	Judy Hughes	540	17.60	-24.40
New Democratic	Webster Campbell	78	2.5	+1.30
Total valid votes		3086		
Total rejected ballots		13	0.42	
Turnout		3,099		
Progressive Conservative hold		Swing		+35.0
