= Barb Ramsay =

Canadian politician

The Honourable Barb Ramsay MLA

Member of the Legislative Assembly of Prince Edward Island for Summerside-South Drive
- Incumbent
- Assumed office April 3, 2023
- Preceded by: Steve Howard

Minister of Social Development and Seniors
- Incumbent
- Assumed office April 2023
- Preceded by: Matthew MacKay

Minister Responsible for the Status of Women
- In office February, 2026 – September 2, 2026
- Preceded by: Jenn Redmond
- Succeeded by: Jenn Redmond

Personal details
- Party: Progressive Conservative

Barb Ramsay is a Canadian politician who was elected to the Legislative Assembly of Prince Edward Island in the 2023 provincial election. She represents Summerside-South Drive as a member of the Progressive Conservative Party.

== Electoral record ==
2023 Prince Edward Island general election: Summerside-South Drive
Party	Candidate	Votes	%	±%
Progressive Conservative	Barb Ramsay	1,378	53.30	+31.0
Green	Steve Howard	739	28.60	-15.30
Liberal	Nancy-Beth Guptill	397	15.40	-16.20
New Democratic	Kathryn Yule	70	2.70	+0.50
Total valid votes		2598		
Total rejected ballots		14	0.53	
Turnout		2,612		
Progressive Conservative gain		Swing		+31.0
