= Hilton MacLennan =

Canadian politician

Hon. Hilton MacLennan MLA

Minister of Agriculture
- Incumbent
- Assumed office September 2, 2026
- Preceded by: Bloyce Thompson

Member of the Legislative Assembly of Prince Edward Island for Tyne Valley-Sherbrooke
- Incumbent
- Assumed office April 3, 2023
- Preceded by: Trish Altass

Personal details
- Party: Progressive Conservative

Hilton MacLennan is a Canadian politician who was elected to the Legislative Assembly of Prince Edward Island in the 2023 provincial election. MacLennan represents Tyne Valley-Sherbrooke as a Progressive Conservative.

On September 2, 2026, MacLennan was promoted to Executive Council to serve as Minister of Agriculture. He took over the role from Bloyce Thompson who served in the role for the majority of the period from when the PC's gained power in 2019, to present. MacLennan, like Thompson, has a background in farming.

== Electoral record ==
2023 Prince Edward Island general election: Tyne Valley-Sherbrooke
Party	Candidate	Votes	%	±%
Progressive Conservative	Hilton MacLennan	1356	51.20	+18.0
Green	Trish Altass	964	37.20	+1.60
Liberal	Wayne Cobb	212	8.20	20.30
Independent	Wayne Biggar	49	1.90	
New Democratic	Carol Rybinski	37	1.4	-1.20
Total valid votes		2602		
Total rejected ballots		14	0.54	
Turnout		2,616		
Progressive Conservative gain		Swing		+18.0

2019 Prince Edward Island general election: Tyne Valley-Sherbrooke
Party	Candidate	Votes	%	±%
Green	Trish Altass	1,101	35.60	+26.7
Progressive Conservative	Hilton MacLennan	1,026	33.20	+3.1
Liberal	Paula Biggar	882	28.50	-14.17
New Democratic	John Enman	81	2.60	-14.99
Total valid votes		3,110		
Total rejected ballots		20	0.64	-0.2
Turnout		3,130		
Green gain		Swing		+26.7
