= Robin Croucher =

Canadian politician

The Honourable Robin Croucher MLA

Minister of Education and Early Years
- Incumbent
- Assumed office February 27th, 2025
- Premier: Rob Lantz
- Preceded by: Rob Lantz

Member of the Legislative Assembly of Prince Edward Island for Souris-Elmira
- Incumbent
- Assumed office April 3, 2023
- Preceded by: Colin LaVie

Personal details
- Party: Progressive Conservative

Robin Croucher is a Canadian politician who was elected to the Legislative Assembly of Prince Edward Island in the 2023 provincial election. Croucher represents Souris-Elmira as a Progressive Conservative. He worked as a Primary Care Paramedic with Island EMS since 2011, prior to the election, and also owns a mechanical company titled AutoMedic.

Before entering cabinet, Croucher served on the standing committees of Education and Economic Growth as an Observing Member, as well as Health and Social Development as a Committee Member.

== Electoral record ==
2023 Prince Edward Island general election: Souris-Elmira
Party	Candidate	Votes	%	±%
Progressive Conservative	Robin Croucher	1,593	55.40	+10.70
Green	Boyd Leard	757	26.30	-0.40
Liberal	Amber Dennis	481	16.70	-11.90
New Democratic	Gordon Gay	29	1	+100
Island Party	Ahava De Kalnas Kalnassy	16	0.60	+100
Total valid votes		2892		
Total rejected ballots		16	0.55	
Turnout		2,908		
Progressive Conservative hold		Swing		+10.70
