= Evangeline-Miscouche =

Provincial electoral district in Prince Edward Island, Canada

Prince Edward Island electoral district
- Coordinates: 46.447°N 64.011°W

Provincial electoral district
- Legislature: Legislative Assembly of Prince Edward Island
MLA
Gilles Arsenault
Independent
- District created: 1996
- First contested: 1996
- Last contested: 2023

Evangeline-Miscouche (District 24) is a provincial electoral district for the Legislative Assembly of Prince Edward Island, Canada.

Evangeline-Miscouche is a Francophone- and Acadian-majority riding.

== Members ==
The riding has elected the following members of the Legislative Assembly:

Members of the Legislative Assembly for Evangeline-Miscouche
Assembly	Years	Member	Party
See 3rd Prince 1873–1996
60th	1996–2000	Robert Maddix	Liberal
61st	2000–2003	Wilfred Arsenault	Progressive Conservative
62nd	2003–2007	Wilfred Arsenault	Progressive Conservative
63rd	2007–2011	Sonny Gallant	Liberal
64th	2011–2015	Sonny Gallant	Liberal
65th	2015–2019	Sonny Gallant	Liberal
66th	2019–2023	Sonny Gallant	Liberal
67th	2023–2026	Gilles Arsenault	Progressive Conservative
67th	2026–present	Gilles Arsenault	Independent

== Election results ==
2023 Prince Edward Island general election
Party	Candidate	Votes	%	±%
Progressive Conservative	Gilles Arsenault	1,384	61.7	+38.4
Liberal	Pat MacLellan	543	24.2	-20.3
Green	Jason Charette	271	12.1	-18.7
New Democratic	Charles Turriff	45	2.0	+0.7
Total valid votes		2,243	100.0	
Progressive Conservative gain from Liberal		Swing		+29.4

2019 Prince Edward Island general election
Party	Candidate	Votes	%	±%
Liberal	Sonny Gallant	1,100	44.6%	-17.97
Green	Nick Arsenault	761	30.8%	+25.29
Progressive Conservative	Jason Woodbury	575	23.3%	-2.54
New Democratic	Grant Gallant	33	1.3%	-4.78
Total valid votes				
Liberal hold		Swing		

2015 Prince Edward Island general election
Party	Candidate	Votes	%	±%
Liberal	Sonny Gallant	1,419	62.57	-14.65
Progressive Conservative	Debbie Montgomery	586	25.84	+7.10
New Democratic	Grant Gallant	138	6.08	
Green	Jordan Cameron	125	5.51	+2.64
Total valid votes		2,268	100.0	
Liberal hold		Swing		-10.88

2011 Prince Edward Island general election
Party	Candidate	Votes	%	±%
Liberal	Sonny Gallant	1,722	77.22	+21.41
Progressive Conservative	Edgar Arsenault	418	18.74	-21.06
Green	Melissa Hotte	64	2.87	-1.51
Island	Arthur Arsenault	26	1.17	
Total valid votes		2,230	100.0	
Liberal hold		Swing		+21.24

2007 Prince Edward Island general election
Party	Candidate	Votes	%	±%
Liberal	Sonny Gallant	1,311	55.81	+9.15
Progressive Conservative	Wilfred Arsenault	935	39.80	-10.88
Green	Mannie Gallant	103	4.38	
Total valid votes		2,349	100.0	
Liberal gain from Progressive Conservative		Swing		+10.02

2003 Prince Edward Island general election
Party	Candidate	Votes	%	±%
Progressive Conservative	J. Wilfred Arsenault	1,312	50.68	+2.22
Liberal	Sonny Gallant	1,208	46.66	+1.53
New Democratic	Leona Arsenault	69	2.67	-3.74
Total valid votes		2,589	100.0	
Progressive Conservative hold		Swing		+0.34

2000 Prince Edward Island general election
Party	Candidate	Votes	%	±%
Progressive Conservative	Wilfred Arsenault	1,209	48.46	+18.36
Liberal	Robert Joseph Maddix	1,126	45.13	-17.07
New Democratic	Leona Arsenault Belaire	160	6.41	-1.29
Total valid votes		2,495	100.0	
Progressive Conservative gain from Liberal		Swing		17.72

1996 Prince Edward Island general election
Party	Candidate	Votes	%
Liberal	Robert Joseph Maddix	1,519	62.20
Progressive Conservative	Gerard Richard	735	30.10
New Democratic	Gerard Bernard	188	7.70
Total valid votes		2,442	100.0
This riding was created from parts of the dual-member riding of 3rd Prince.

=== 2016 electoral reform plebiscite results ===
2016 Prince Edward Island electoral reform referendum
Side	Votes	%
First Past the Post	245	30.43
Mixed Member Proportional	214	26.58
Dual Member Proportional Representation	166	20.62
Preferential Voting	118	14.66
First Past the Post plus leaders	62	7.70
Two-choice preferred result
Mixed Member Proportional	386	51.95
First Past the Post	357	48.05
Total votes cast	805	29.84
Registered voters	2,698	
Source "Plebiscite Report" (PDF).

== See also ==
- List of Prince Edward Island provincial electoral districts
- Canadian provincial electoral districts
