= Premier of Prince Edward Island =

Head of government of Prince Edward Island

- Premier ministre de l'Île-du-Prince-Édouard
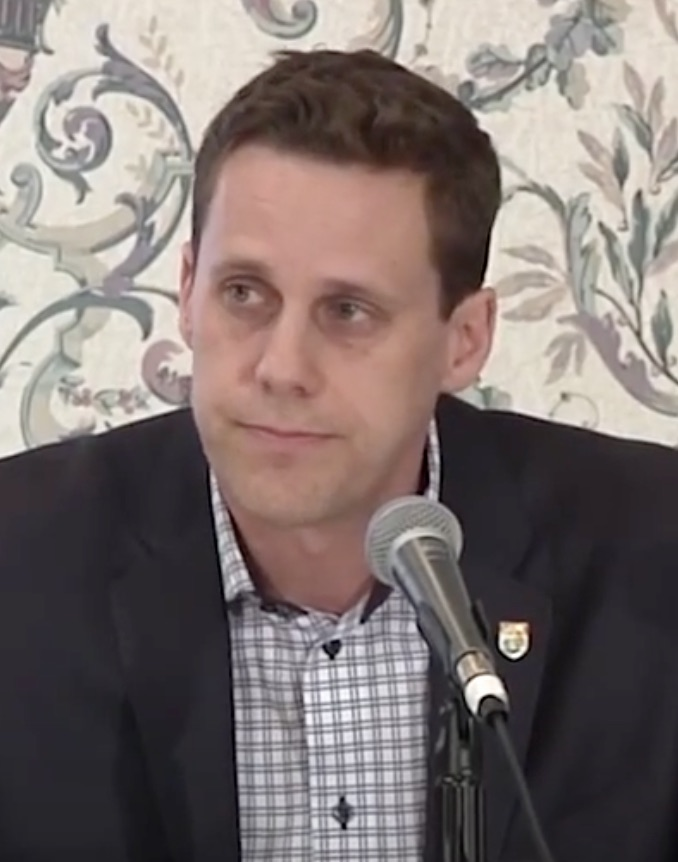
- Incumbent; Rob Lantz since February 9, 2026
- Office of the Premier
- Style: The Honourable (formal); Premier (informal)
- Status: Head of Government
- Member of: Legislative Assembly; Executive Council
- Reports to: Legislative Assembly; Lieutenant Governor
- Seat: Charlottetown
- Appointer: Lieutenant Governor of Prince Edward Island with the confidence of the Prince Edward Island Legislature
- Term length: At His Majesty's pleasure contingent on the premier's ability to command confidence in the legislative assembly
- Formation: 1851
- First holder: George Coles
- Deputy: Deputy Premier of Prince Edward Island
- Salary: $78,541 plus $85,302 (indemnity and allowances)
- Website: Office of the Premier

The premier of Prince Edward Island is the first minister to the lieutenant governor of the Canadian province of Prince Edward Island and presides over the Executive Council of Prince Edward Island. Following the Westminster system, the premier is normally the leader of the political party which has the most seats in the Legislative Assembly of Prince Edward Island who is called upon by the lieutenant governor to form a government. As the province's head of government, the premier exercises considerable power.

The current premier of Prince Edward Island is Rob Lantz, from the Progressive Conservative Party.

== Responsibilities ==
The premier serves as president of the Executive Council (Cabinet). They choose the other members of the Cabinet, who are then appointed by the lieutenant governor. As president of the Executive Council, the premier forms the government. They lead the Executive Council's decision-making process as the Council develops and implements the government's priorities and policies. The premier establishes the Executive Council's methods of operation and organization and that of its committees.

== See also ==
- Prime Minister of Canada
- Premier (Canada)
- List of premiers of Prince Edward Island
