= Legislative Assembly of Prince Edward Island =

Single house of PEI legislature

Legislative Assembly of Prince Edward Island Assemblée législative de l'Île-du-Prince-Édouard
- 67th General Assembly of Prince Edward Island

Type
- Type: Unicameral house of the General Assembly of Prince Edward Island

History
- Founded: 1893
- Preceded by: Bicameral: Legislative Council; House of Assembly

Leadership
- Speaker: Brad Trivers since March 25, 2026
- Premier: Rob Lantz, Progressive Conservative since February 9, 2026
- Leader of the Official Opposition: Hal Perry, Liberal since April 12, 2023

Structure
- Seats: 27
- Political groups: Government: Progressive Conservative (18); Official Opposition: Liberal (4); Other parties: Green (4); Independent (1)

Elections
- Last election: April 3, 2023
- Next election: On or before October 4, 2027

Meeting place
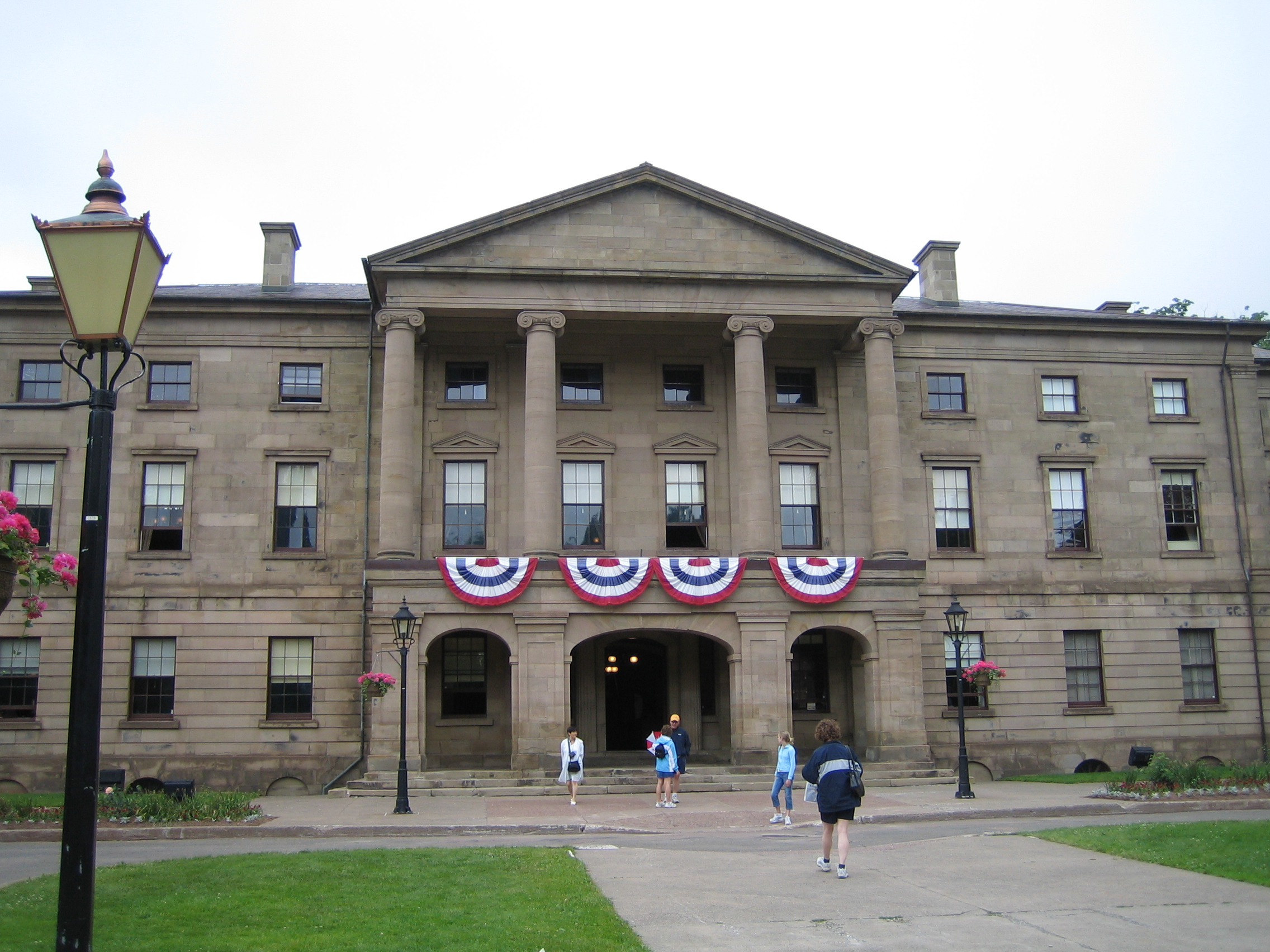
- Province House, Charlottetown, Prince Edward Island, Canada (Meeting at the adjacent Hon. George Coles Building during restoration)

Website
- assembly.pe.ca

The Legislative Assembly of Prince Edward Island (French: Assemblée législative de l'Île-du-Prince-Édouard) together with the lieutenant governor of Prince Edward Island form the General Assembly of Prince Edward Island. The Legislative Assembly meets at Province House, which is at the intersection of Richmond and Great George Streets in Charlottetown. Bills passed by the Assembly are given royal assent by the lieutenant governor in the name of the King of Canada.

== History ==
In 1769, PEI was created as the British colony of St. John's Island. That year, a British order in council established a new government in the colony. In 1770, Lieutenant Governor Walter Patterson (the island's first governor) arrived and appointed a seven-member council to assist him in the administration of the island. By 1773, at the insistence of the British government, Governor Patterson summoned the island's first assembly.

As a colony, Prince Edward Island originally had a bicameral legislature founded in 1773 with the Legislative Council of Prince Edward Island serving as the upper house and the House of Assembly as the lower house. Together they composed the 1st General Assembly of the Island of Saint John, which sat for just ten days.

Elections for the island's first House of Assembly were held on July 4, 1773, with 18 members being elected in an at-large district. Tradition has it that the first session of the island's new assembly was held in the Crossed Keys Tavern on the corner of Queen and Dorchester Streets in Charlottetown; however, a journal entry contradicts this and indicates that it was actually held in the home of James Richardson.

After the name of the colony changed in 1798, the body became known as the General Assembly of Prince Edward Island.

The House of Assembly was increased in size to 24 in 1839. At the same time, the single, colony-wide at-large district was divided, with four dual-member constituencies created in each of the three counties. It was enlarged again in 1856, to 30 members elected in five dual-member constituencies in each county, an electoral map that would be in place until 1966. The Legislative Council remained an appointed body (prior to 1862).

As well in 1839, an important distinction was drawn between the executive and legislative capacities of the Legislative Council. The Executive Council and Legislative Councils were separated in 1839. The Legislative Assembly was given three seats on the Executive Council. The three members were appointed by the Governor. This separation of Executive Council and Legislative Councils proved to be an important step on the road to responsible government, which was finally achieved on April 23, 1851, when Liberal members under their leader George Coles were appointed as members of the Executive Council. However PEI still experienced political troubles, and no less than 12 different governments reigned in the 1851–1872 period.

In 1862, the Legislative Council became an elected body, with 13 members elected by property owners.

In 1873, PEI became a province in Confederation, with the old colonial bicameral government merely changing to a bicameral provincial government. Up to 1893, Prince Edward Island retained its long-standing bicameral system of government, consisting of a Legislative Council (elected after 1862) and an elected House of Assembly.

In 1893 the province became unicameral. Instead of simply abolishing its upper house as other Canadian provinces with historically bicameral legislatures did, Prince Edward Island merged the two houses. Its two chambers were amalgamated in 1893 to create one "Legislative Assembly" consisting of 30 members elected separately in 15 different two-seat constituencies through first-past-the-post voting. The only change to this system of returning members to the assembly was the addition of two members after the creation of 6th Queens in 1966.

The province was divided into dual-member districts, each of which was represented by one member who held the title assemblyman and one member who held the title councillor. This was a holdover from the legislature's historic bicameral structure in place until 1893.

After 1893, both members sat in the same legislative house. At first two separate groups elected the two members in each district—voters living in a district voted for the assemblyman while the voters plus any owning property in the district could vote for the councillor.

The property qualification was discontinued in 1963, largely eliminating any practical distinction between the roles of councillor and assemblyman, although the nominal titles continued to be used for the two types of members sitting in the legislative house.

The boundaries of the 15 districts were never adjusted for demographic or population changes, except for the division of 5th Queens, the district that contained the capital city of Charlottetown, into two districts prior to the 1966.

In 1996, the system and the electoral map were restructured, and the province now has twenty-seven members of the Legislative Assembly, each elected from a different constituency.

In 2015, Province House was closed for repairs and conservation work. The legislature moved to the adjacent Hon. George Coles Building, where it is expected to remain for several years.

PEI's current single-member districts were introduced in 1996.

== Composition ==
The Legislative Assembly currently has 27 single-member districts and is currently the smallest provincial assembly in Canada.

== Seating plan ==
	Arsenault	Dollar	Ramsay	Redmond	Deagle	Bell
	Hudson	Curran	MacKay	Thompson	LANTZ	Burridge	Compton
Trivers
		MacEwen	Croucher		PERRY	McNeilly	Bernard	MacFARLANE
	Dillon	MacLennan	DesRoches		Henderson	Simpson	Willows	Bevan-Baker

Current as of 2026

== Members of the General Assembly ==
Cabinet ministers are in bold, party leaders are in italic, and the Speaker of the Legislative Assembly is designated by a dagger (†).

Name	Party	Riding	First elected / previously elected
**Ernie Hudson**	Progressive Conservative	Alberton-Bloomfield	2019
**Darlene Compton**	Progressive Conservative	Belfast-Murray River	2015
Jamie Fox (until November 11, 2023)	Progressive Conservative	Borden-Kinkora	2015
Matt MacFarlane (since February 7, 2024)	Green	Borden-Kinkora	2024
Dennis King (until February 21, 2025)	Progressive Conservative	Brackley-Hunter River	2019
Kent Dollar (since August 12, 2025)	Progressive Conservative	Brackley-Hunter River	2025
Susie Dillon	Progressive Conservative	Charlottetown-Belvedere	2023
**Rob Lantz**	Progressive Conservative	Charlottetown-Brighton	2023
Natalie Jameson (until February 11, 2025)	Progressive Conservative	Charlottetown-Hillsborough Park	2019
Carolyn Simpson (since August 12, 2025)	Liberal	Charlottetown-Hillsborough Park	2025
Karla Bernard	Green	Charlottetown-Victoria Park	2019
Gordon McNeilly	Liberal	Charlottetown-West Royalty	2019
**Zack Bell**	Progressive Conservative	Charlottetown-Winsloe	2020
Mark McLane (until March 17, 2026)	Progressive Conservative	Cornwall-Meadowbank	2021
Tayte Willows (since July 13, 2026)	Green	Cornwall-Meadowbank	2026
Gilles Arsenault	Progressive Conservative	Evangeline-Miscouche	2023
Gilles Arsenault	Independent	Evangeline-Miscouche	2023
Steven Myers (until October 3, 2025)	Progressive Conservative	Georgetown-Pownal	2011
Brendan Curran (since December 8, 2025)	Progressive Conservative	Georgetown-Pownal	2025
Matthew MacKay	Progressive Conservative	Kensington-Malpeque	2015
**Jenn Redmond**	Progressive Conservative	Mermaid-Stratford	2023
**Cory Deagle**	Progressive Conservative	Montague-Kilmuir	2019
**Sidney MacEwen**	Progressive Conservative	Morell-Donagh	2015
Peter Bevan-Baker	Green	New Haven-Rocky Point	2015
Robert Henderson	Liberal	O'Leary-Inverness	2007
Brad Trivers†	Progressive Conservative	Rustico-Emerald	2015
**Robin Croucher**	Progressive Conservative	Souris-Elmira	2023
**Bloyce Thompson**	Progressive Conservative	Stanhope-Marshfield	2019
**Jill Burridge**	Progressive Conservative	Stratford-Keppoch	2023
**Barb Ramsay**	Progressive Conservative	Summerside-South Drive	2023
Tyler DesRoches	Progressive Conservative	Summerside-Wilmot	2023
Hal Perry	Liberal	Tignish-Palmer Road	2011 (Note: First elected as a Progressive Conservative)
Hilton MacLennan	Progressive Conservative	Tyne Valley-Sherbrooke	2023

== Party membership ==
Number of members per party by date	2023		2024	2025					2026		
Number of members per party by date	Apr 3	Nov 11	Feb 7	Feb 11	Feb 21	Aug 12	Oct 3	Dec 8	Mar 17	Mar 29	Jul 13
Progressive Conservative	22	21		20	19	20	19	20	19	18	
Liberal	3					4					
Green	2		3								4
Independent	0									1	
Total members	27	26	27	26	25	27	26	27	26		27
Vacant	0	1	0	1	2	0	1	0	1		0
Government Majority	17	16	15	14		13		12	13	12	11

=== Membership changes ===
Membership changes in the 67th Assembly
Date	Name	District	Party	Reason
April 3, 2023	See List of Members		Election day of the 2023 Prince Edward Island general election	
November 11, 2023	Jamie Fox	Borden-Kinkora	Progressive Conservative	Resigned to run for Malpeque seat, in the 2025 federal election
February 7, 2024	Matt MacFarlane	Borden-Kinkora	Green	Won by-election
February 11, 2025	Natalie Jameson	Charlottetown-Hillsborough Park	Progressive Conservative	Resigned to run for Charlottetown seat, in the 2025 federal election
February 21, 2025	Dennis King	Brackley-Hunter River	Progressive Conservative	Resigned; later appointed Ambassador to Ireland
August 12, 2025	Carolyn Simpson	Charlottetown-Hillsborough Park	Liberal	Won by-election
August 12, 2025	Kent Dollar	Brackley-Hunter River	Progressive Conservative	Won by-election
October 3, 2025	Steven Myers	Georgetown-Pownal	Progressive Conservative	Resigned
December 8, 2025	Brendan Curran	Georgetown-Pownal	Progressive Conservative	Won by-election
March 17, 2026	Mark McLane	Cornwall-Meadowbank	Progressive Conservative	Died in office.
July 13, 2026	Tayte Willows	Cornwall-Meadowbank	Green	Won by-election

== Officers ==
The legislature Black Rod has been carried by the Sergeant-at-Arms since 2000.

== See also ==
- List of Prince Edward Island General Assemblies
