= Charlottetown-Winsloe =

Provincial electoral district in Prince Edward Island, Canada

Prince Edward Island electoral district
- Coordinates: 46.273°N 63.153°W

Provincial electoral district
- Legislature: Legislative Assembly of Prince Edward Island
MLA
Zack Bell
Progressive Conservative
- District created: 2019
- First contested: 2019
- Last contested: 2023

Demographics
- Census division: Queens County
- Census subdivision: Charlottetown

Charlottetown-Winsloe (District 10) is a provincial electoral district for the Legislative Assembly of Prince Edward Island, Canada. It was created prior to the 2019 election from parts of the former districts Charlottetown-Sherwood, West Royalty-Springvale, and York-Oyster Bed.

The riding is located in the city of Charlottetown, including the community of Winsloe and parts of the neighbourhood of Sherwood.

== Members ==
Members of the Legislative Assembly for Charlottetown-Winsloe
Assembly	Years	Member	Party
66th	2019–2020	Robert Mitchell	Liberal
66th	2020–2023	Zack Bell	Progressive; Conservative
67th	2023–present	Zack Bell	Progressive; Conservative

== Election results ==
=== Charlottetown-Winsloe, 2019–present ===
2023 Prince Edward Island general election
Party	Candidate	Votes	%	±%
Progressive Conservative	Zack Bell	1,861	60.6	+11.5
Green	Charles Sanderson	553	18.0	-9.4
Liberal	Judy Hughes	540	17.6	-4.7
New Democratic	Campbell Webster	78	2.5	+1.2
Independent	Georgina Bassett	41	1.3	
Total valid votes		3,073	100.0	
Progressive Conservative hold		Swing		+10.5

By-election, November 2, 2020 Resignation of Robert Mitchell
Party	Candidate	Votes	%	±%
Progressive Conservative	Zack Bell	1,402	49.06	+23.49
Green	Chris van Ouwerkerk	783	27.40	-3.85
Liberal	Zac Murphy	636	22.25	-19.72
New Democratic	Lynne Thiele	37	1.29	+0.08
Total valid votes		2,858		
Progressive Conservative gain from Liberal		Swing		+21.60

2019 Prince Edward Island general election
Party	Candidate	Votes	%	±%
Liberal	Robert Mitchell	1,420	41.97	-1.1
Green	Amanda Morrison	1,057	31.24	+21.5
Progressive Conservative	Mike Gillis	865	25.57	-8.6
New Democratic	Jesse Reddin Cousins	41	1.21	-11.8
Total valid votes		3,383	99.79	
Total rejected ballots		7	0.21	
Turnout		3,390	80.47	
Eligible voters		4,213		
This was a newly created district
Source: Elections Prince Edward Island

2015 Prince Edward Island general election redistributed results
Party	Votes	%
Liberal	1,374	43.1
Progressive Conservative	1,091	34.2
New Democratic	415	13.0
Green	311	9.7
Source(s) Source: Ridingbuilder

== Referendum and plebiscite results ==
=== 2019 electoral reform referendum ===
The 2019 Prince Edward Island electoral reform referendum was held on April 23, 2019.

2019 Prince Edward Island electoral reform referendum
Side	Votes	%
Yes	1,787	53.20
No	1,572	46.80
Total valid votes	3,359	100.00
Source: Elections Prince Edward Island

== See also ==
- List of Prince Edward Island provincial electoral districts
- Canadian provincial electoral districts
