= Brendan Curran =

Canadian politician

Brendan Curran MLA

Member of the Legislative Assembly of Prince Edward Island for Georgetown-Pownal
- Incumbent
- Assumed office December 8, 2025
- Preceded by: Steven Myers

Personal details
- Party: Progressive Conservative

Brendan J. Curran is a Canadian politician, who was elected to the Legislative Assembly of Prince Edward Island in the 2025 Georgetown-Pownal provincial by-election. He defeated Liberal Party leader Robert Mitchell, holding onto the seat for the Progressive Conservative Party with a decreased margin.

== Electoral record ==
Prince Edward Island provincial by-election, December 8, 2025: Georgetown-Pownal Resignation of Steven Myers
Party	Candidate	Votes	%	±%
Progressive Conservative	Brendan Curran	986	46.86	-22.93
Liberal	Robert Mitchell	881	41.87	+29.7
Green	Eddie Childs	200	9.51	-3
New Democratic	Kevin Trainor	40	1.90	+0.9
Total valid votes		2,104		
Total rejected ballots				
Turnout		2,104	54.04	
Eligible voters		3,893		
Progressive Conservative hold		Swing		
