= Georgetown-Pownal =

Provincial electoral district in Prince Edward Island, Canada

Prince Edward Island electoral district

Provincial electoral district
- Legislature: Legislative Assembly of Prince Edward Island
MLA
Brendan Curran
Progressive Conservative
- District created: 2019
- First contested: 2019
- Last contested: 2025 by-election

Demographics
- Census division(s): Kings County, Queens County
- Census subdivision(s): Alexandra, Cardigan, Central Kings (FD), Central Kings (RM), Crossroads, East River, Part 1, East River, Part 2, Hazelbrook, Morell (FD), Three Rivers, Vernon River

Georgetown-Pownal (District 2) is a provincial electoral district for the Legislative Assembly of Prince Edward Island, Canada. The district was contested for the first time in the 2019 Prince Edward Island general election.

It was created out of parts of Georgetown-St. Peters, Vernon River-Stratford, and Morell-Mermaid.

== Geography ==
The riding is mostly rural, and is located in the east part of the province. It extends from the eastern fringes of the Charlottetown metropolitan area in the west (Pownal area) to Georgetown and the north coast of Cardigan Bay on the east coast of the island. The riding covers the Route 5 corridor.

== Members ==
The riding has elected the following members of the Legislative Assembly:

Members of the Legislative Assembly for Georgetown-Pownal
Assembly	Years	Member	Party
66th	2019–2023	Steven Myers	Progressive Conservative
67th	2023–2025	Steven Myers	Progressive Conservative
67th	2025–present	Brendan Curran	Progressive Conservative

== Election results ==
=== Georgetown-Pownal, 2019–present ===
Prince Edward Island provincial by-election, December 8, 2025 Resignation of Steven Myers
Party	Candidate	Votes	%	±%
Progressive Conservative	Brendan Curran	986	46.80	–22.99
Liberal	Robert Mitchell	881	41.81	+29.71
Green	Eddie Childs	200	9.49	–3.03
New Democratic	Kevin Trainor	40	1.90	–0.91
Total valid votes		2,107		
Total rejected ballots				
Turnout		2,104	54.12	–19.18
Eligible voters		3,893		
Progressive Conservative hold		Swing		–26.36

2023 Prince Edward Island general election
Party	Candidate	Votes	%	±%
Progressive Conservative	Steven Myers	1,961	69.79	+21.15
Green	Patrick Brothers	352	12.53	-15.65
Liberal	Allister Veinot	340	12.10	-9.50
New Democratic	Edith Perry	79	2.81	+1.22
Island	Lucy Robbins	78	2.78	
Total valid votes		2,810	99.57	
Total rejected ballots		12	0.43	+0.17
Turnout		2,822	73.30	-8.74
Eligible voters		3,850		
Progressive Conservative hold		Swing		+18.40

2019 Prince Edward Island general election
Party	Candidate	Votes	%	±%
Progressive Conservative	Steven Myers	1,493	48.63	+0.95
Green	Susan Hartley	865	28.18	+22.76
Liberal	Kevin Doyle	663	21.60	-17.38
New Democratic	Edith Perry	49	1.60	-6.32
Total valid votes		3,070	99.74	
Total rejected ballots		8	0.26	
Turnout		3,078	82.04	
Eligible voters		3,752		
Progressive Conservative hold		Swing		-10.91

2015 Prince Edward Island general election redistributed results
Party	Votes	%
Progressive Conservative	1,391	47.69
Liberal	1,137	38.98
New Democratic	231	7.92
Green	158	5.42
Source(s) Source: Ridingbuilder

== See also ==
- List of Prince Edward Island provincial electoral districts
- Canadian provincial electoral districts
