= Steven Myers (politician) =

Canadian politician

The Honourable Steven Myers
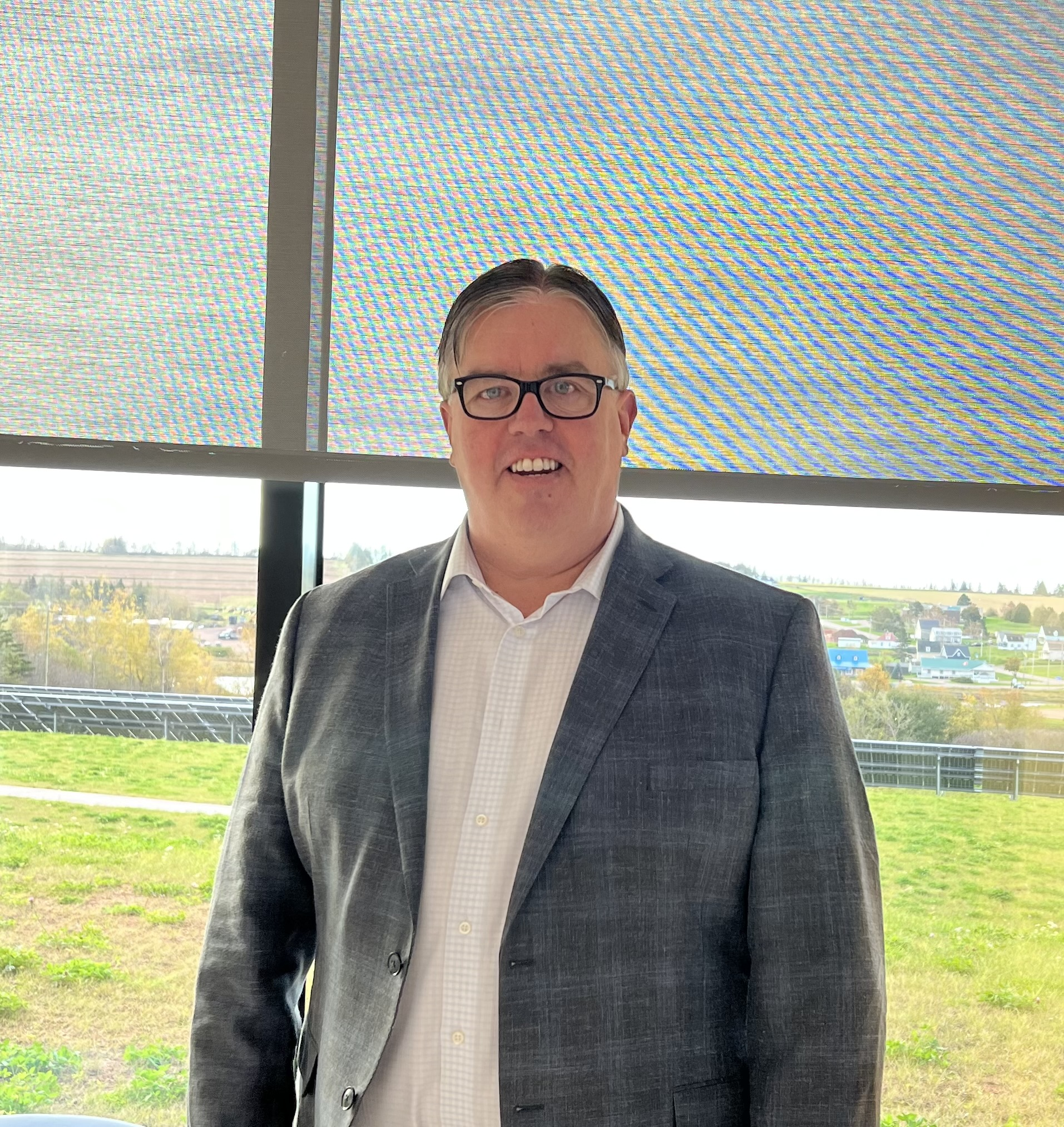

Member of the Legislative Assembly of Prince Edward Island for Georgetown-Pownal
- In office April 23, 2019 – October 3, 2025
- Preceded by: Riding established
- Succeeded by: Brendan Curran

Member of the Legislative Assembly of Prince Edward Island for Georgetown-St. Peters
- In office October 18, 2011 – March 26, 2019
- Preceded by: Michael Currie
- Succeeded by: Riding dissolved

Interim leader of the Progressive Conservative Party of Prince Edward Island
- In office January 31, 2013 – February 28, 2015
- Preceded by: Olive Crane
- Succeeded by: Rob Lantz

Minister of Environment, Energy and Climate Action
- In office February, 2021 – October, 2024
- Preceded by: Brad Trivers
- Succeeded by: Gilles Arsenault

Minister of Housing, Land and Communities
- In office October 9, 2024 – October 3, 2025
- Preceded by: Rob Lantz
- Succeeded by: Cory Deagle

Minister of Transportation, Infrastructure, and Energy
- In office May, 2019 – February, 2021
- Preceded by: Paula Biggar
- Succeeded by: Ernie Hudson

Personal details
- Born: December 8, 1972 (age 53) Montague, Prince Edward Island
- Occupation: Politician

Steven Myers (born 8 December 1972) is a Canadian politician, who was elected to the Legislative Assembly of Prince Edward Island in the 2011 provincial election. He represented the district of Georgetown-Pownal as a member of the Progressive Conservative Party of Prince Edward Island and was Leader of the Opposition in the legislature, from 2013 to 2015.

== Political career ==
He was chosen interim leader of the PEI Progressive Conservative Party on January 31, 2013, following party leader Olive Crane's resignation, and became Opposition leader on February 11, 2013, when Hal Perry relinquished the role.

Myers' tenure as PC interim leader came to an end on February 28, 2015, upon the election of Rob Lantz as leader.

Lantz, who failed to win a seat in the legislature in the 2015 provincial election requested that Myers remain as opposition leader; Myers accepted.

Myers was replaced as opposition leader on October 15, 2015, by newly named PC interim leader Jamie Fox.

On May 9, 2019, Myers was appointed to the Executive Council of Prince Edward Island as Minister of Transportation, Infrastructure and Energy.

He was re-elected in the 2023 general election.

On October 3, 2025, Myers resigned as an MLA and cabinet minister.

== Electoral record ==
2023 Prince Edward Island general election: Georgetown-Pownal
| Party | Candidate | Votes | % | ±% |
|---|---|---|---|---|
| Progressive Conservative | Steven Myers | 1,961 | 69.79 | +21.15 |
| Green | Patrick Brothers | 352 | 12.53 | –15.65 |
| Liberal | Allister Veinot | 340 | 12.10 | –9.50 |
| New Democratic | Edith Perry | 79 | 2.81 | +1.22 |
| Island | Lucy Robbins | 78 | 2.78 | |
| Total valid votes | | 2,810 | 99.57 | |
| Total rejected ballots | | 12 | 0.43 | +0.17 |
| Turnout | | 2,822 | 73.30 | –8.74 |
| Eligible voters | | 3,850 | | |
| Progressive Conservative hold | | Swing | | +18.40 |

2019 Prince Edward Island general election: Georgetown-Pownal
| Party | Candidate | Votes | % | ±% |
|---|---|---|---|---|
| Progressive Conservative | Steven Myers | 1,493 | 48.63 | +0.95 |
| Green | Susan Hartley | 865 | 28.18 | +22.76 |
| Liberal | Kevin Doyle | 663 | 21.60 | –17.38 |
| New Democratic | Edith Perry | 49 | 1.60 | –6.32 |
| Total valid votes | | 3,070 | 99.74 | |
| Total rejected ballots | | 8 | 0.26 | |
| Turnout | | 3,078 | 82.04 | |
| Eligible voters | | 3,752 | | |
| Progressive Conservative hold | | Swing | | –10.91 |

2015 Prince Edward Island general election: Georgetown-St. Peters
| Party | Candidate | Votes | % | ±% |
|---|---|---|---|---|
| Progressive Conservative | Steven Myers | 1,448 | 48.0 | -4.0 |
| Liberal | Russ Stewart | 1170 | 39.0 | -1.85 |
| New Democratic | Nathan Bushey | 256 | 8.47 | +5.54 |
| Green | Heather Gallant | 145 | 4.80 | +3.22 |
| Total valid votes | | 3019 | | |
| Total rejected ballots | | 10 | 0.33 | |
| Turnout | | 3,029 | | |
| Eligible voters | | 3,571 | | |
| Progressive Conservative hold | | Swing | | -4.0 |

2011 Prince Edward Island general election: Georgetown-St. Peters
| Party | Candidate | Votes | % | ±% |
|---|---|---|---|---|
| Progressive Conservative | Steven Myers | 1,575 | 52.99 | +0.12 |
| Liberal | Kevin Gotell | 1,214 | 40.85 | -2.10 |
| New Democratic | Jane Dunphy | 87 | 2.93 | -0.3 |
| Green | Jason Furness | 47 | 1.58 | |
| Island Party | Ray Cantelo | 32 | 1.08 | |
| Total valid votes | | 2,680 | | |
| Total rejected ballots | | 4 | 0.15 | |
| Turnout | | 2,684 | | |
| Eligible voters | | 3,112 | | |
| Progressive Conservative hold | | Swing | | +0.12 |
