= Jenn Redmond =

Canadian politician

Jenn Redmond MLA

Member of the Legislative Assembly of Prince Edward Island for Mermaid-Stratford
- Incumbent
- Assumed office April 3, 2023
- Preceded by: Michele Beaton

Minister of Workforce, and Advanced Learning
- Incumbent
- Assumed office September 2, 2026
- Preceded by: Zack Bell

Minister of Economic Development, Trade, and AI
- In office March, 2026 – September 2, 2026
- Preceded by: Gilles Arsenault
- Succeeded by: Zack Bell

Minister of Workforce, Advanced Learning, and Population
- In office April, 2023 – February, 2026
- Preceded by: Bloyce Thompson
- Succeeded by: Zack Bell

Minister Responsible for the Status of Women
- In office October, 2024 – February, 2026

Personal details
- Party: Progressive Conservative

Jenn Redmond is a Canadian politician who was elected to the Legislative Assembly of Prince Edward Island in the 2023 provincial election. She represents Mermaid-Stratford as a member of the Progressive Conservative Party. She served as the Minister of Workforce, Advanced Learning and Population, and Minister Responsible for the Status of Women.

== Electoral record ==
2023 Prince Edward Island general election: Mermaid-Stratford
Party	Candidate	Votes	%	±%
Progressive Conservative	Jenn Redmond	1,245	45.30	+14.40
Green	Michelle Beaton	1,207	43.90	+5.80
Liberal	Gail MacDonald	254	9.20	-20.60
New Democratic	Lawrence Millar	43	1.60	+.30
Total valid votes		2755		
Total rejected ballots		7	0.25	
Turnout		2,762		
Progressive Conservative gain		Swing		+14.40
