= Gilles Arsenault =

Canadian politician

Gilles Arsenault MLA

Member of the Legislative Assembly of Prince Edward Island for Evangeline-Miscouche
- Incumbent
- Assumed office April 3, 2023
- Preceded by: Sonny Gallant

Minister of Economic Development, Innovation, and Artificial Intelligence
- In office February 12, 2026 – March 28, 2026
- Succeeded by: Jenn Redmond

Minister of Environment, Energy, and Climate Action
- In office October 2024 – February 2026
- Succeeded by: Darlene Compton

Personal details
- Party: Independent (since March 2026)
- Other political affiliations: PC (2023–2026), Liberal (2015)

Gilles Arsenault is a Canadian politician who was elected to the Legislative Assembly of Prince Edward Island in the 2023 provincial election. He represents Evangeline-Miscouche as an Independent. Until 2026, he represented the Progressive Conservatives.

In 2026, he was removed from his ministerial portfolios by Premier Rob Lantz after an alleged $100,000 donation was received by a non-profit organization in his electoral district from a private land developer. Following the donation, the developer was issued a permit to work within a wetland area. Arsenault has stated the permit approval and the donation were not related. Following his removal from the provincial cabinet, the RCMP confirmed they were investigating the transaction.

== Early career ==
Arsenault served as the president of the Prince Edward Island Teachers Federation, beginning in 2011. Prior to assuming the position, Arsenault had served as the principal of École Évangéline.

In 2014, Arsenault announced that he would be seeking the Liberal nomination in the riding of Egmont in the upcoming federal election. The nomination ultimately went to Bobby Morrissey, who went on to win the election, defeating Gail Shea, the Conservative incumbent.

In 2015, Arsenault stepped down as president of the PEITF, and took a job with the provincial government, coordinating the province's French programs. In 2021, Arsenault became superintendent of the Commission Scolaire de la Langue Francaise.

== Provincial politics ==
Arsenault was elected to the Legislative Assembly of Prince Edward Island in 2023. He served as Minister of Economic Development, Innovation and Trade from 2023 to 2024, and as Minister of Environment, Energy and Climate Action from 2024 to 2026. He also served as Minister of responsible for Acadian and Francophone Affairs and Minister of Economic Development, Trade and Artificial Intelligence until his dismissal from cabinet in 2026.

In October 2025, Arsenault met with representatives from the P.E.I. Ocean View Resort, which had obtained a permit to work within in wetland in October 2024. The representatives requested that the Department of Environment grant approval for the resort to develop an additional area of wetland. Arsenault approved this request verbally. In late 2025, Arsenault contacted the Comité Diversité et Equité, a non-profit organisation in his district, and asked if they were accepting donations. On January 28, 2026, P.E.I. Ocean View Resort made a $100,000 donation to the Comité Diversité et Equité. In February 2026, the Department of Environment issued a stop work order, as they believed that the developers were operating on a greater area of wetland than Arsenault had approved.

Arsenault was dismissed from cabinet on March 28, 2026, and suspended from the Progressive Conservative caucus on March 29, pending an investigation by the province's conflict of interest commissioner. Premier Rob Lantz justified this decision by saying that Arsenault's conduct in relation to P.E.I. Ocean View Resort's requests had created a perceived conflict of interest.

In response to his removal, Arsenault apologised for his behaviour, saying that he takes full responsibility for the situation. Arsenault said that he recommended the Comité Diversité et Equité to the developers after they said that they were interested in making a donation to an environmental or charitable initiative, but that it was not his intention to make it appear as if the approval was made in exchange for the donation. He also said that the Comité Diversité et Equité was in the process of returning the donation.

In April 2026, the RCMP confirmed that it was investigating Arsenault's conduct. On May 22, 2026, Arsenault requested a formal leave of absence from the legislature, which was granted by Brad Trivers, the Speaker of the Legislature. Arsenault currently represents his district as an independent.

== Personal life ==
Arsenault resides in Abram-Village, with his wife, Leonie, and their three sons.

== Electoral results ==
2023 Prince Edward Island general election: Evangeline-Miscouche
Party	Candidate	Votes	%	±%
Progressive Conservative	Gilles Arsenault	1,384	61.7	+38.4
Liberal	Pat MacLellan	543	24.2	-20.3
Green	Jason Charette	271	12.1	-18.7
New Democratic	Charles Turriff	45	2.0	+0.7
Total valid votes		2,243	100.0	
Progressive Conservative gain from Liberal		Swing		+29.4
