= Rob Lantz =

Premier of Prince Edward Island 2025–2025; since 2026)

The Honourable Rob Lantz MLA
- Lantz in 2026

34th Premier of Prince Edward Island
- Incumbent
- Assumed office February 9, 2026
- Monarch: Charles III
- Lieutenant Governor: Wassim Salamoun
- Deputy: Vacant
- Preceded by: Bloyce Thompson
- In office February 21, 2025 – December 12, 2025
- Monarch: Charles III
- Lieutenant Governor: Wassim Salamoun
- Deputy: Bloyce Thompson
- Preceded by: Dennis King
- Succeeded by: Bloyce Thompson

Leader of the Progressive Conservative Party of Prince Edward Island
- Incumbent
- Assumed office February 7, 2026
- Preceded by: Bloyce Thompson (interim)
- Interim leader February 21, 2025 – December 12, 2025
- Preceded by: Dennis King
- Succeeded by: Bloyce Thompson (interim)
- In office February 28, 2015 – September 23, 2015
- Preceded by: Steven Myers (interim)
- Succeeded by: Jamie Fox (interim)

Minister of Housing, Land, and Communities
- In office April, 2023 – October, 2024
- Preceded by: Matthew MacKay
- Succeeded by: Steven Myers

Minister of Education and Early Years
- In office October, 2024 – February, 2025
- Preceded by: Natalie Jameson
- Succeeded by: Robin Croucher

Member of the Legislative Assembly of Prince Edward Island for Charlottetown-Brighton
- Incumbent
- Assumed office April 3, 2023
- Preceded by: Ole Hammarlund

Personal details
- Born: 1969 or 1970 (age 56–57)
- Party: Progressive Conservative
- Spouse: Kelly Lantz
- Children: 2
- Relatives: Jeff Lantz (brother)
- Profession: Politician

Robert Lantz (born February 11, 1970) is a Canadian politician who has served as the 34th premier of Prince Edward Island since February 9, 2026; he previously held the position from February to December 2025. A member of the Progressive Conservative Party of Prince Edward Island (PC), Lantz has served as the party's leader three times: from February to September 2015, from February to December 2025 as interim leader, and since February 9, 2026.

From 2006 to 2014, Lantz was a member of the Charlottetown City Council. He was elected as PC leader for the first time at a leadership election on February 28, 2015. After resigning as leader following the 2015 provincial election, Lantz was elected as the MLA for Charlottetown-Brighton in 2023. He served in the Dennis King Cabinet and assumed the premiership following King's resignation; Lantz briefly resigned as interim PC leader to run in the 2026 leadership election, which he won.

== Political career ==
Lantz led the PC party in the 2015 provincial election, but fell 24 votes short in his attempt to win his own seat representing the riding of Charlottetown-Brighton in the provincial legislature. The margin was reduced to 22 votes after a recount. Lantz resigned as PC leader on September 23, 2015. Lantz won that seat in the 2023 general election.

Following a commanding victory in the April 3, 2023, provincial election (defeating PEI NDP leader Michelle Neill), Premier Dennis King unveiled his new cabinet. On October 9, 2024, following the resignation from cabinet of Natalie Jameson, Lantz was appointed the Minister of Education and Early Years. Lantz was previously Minister of Housing, Land and Communities.

On February 21, 2025, Lantz became the province's 34th premier and interim PC leader after the resignation of Dennis King. As premier, he also served as Minister responsible for Indigenous Affairs and Minister responsible for Intergovernmental Affairs. He initially declined to seek the permanent leadership. During his first tenure, he signed agreements with other provinces to reduce interprovincial trade barriers in the midst of the United States trade war with Canada. On December 11, 2025, he announced his pending resignation from both positions, effective December 12, 2025, to run in the 2026 Progressive Conservative Party of Prince Edward Island leadership election. Deputy Premier Bloyce Thompson, also the Minister of Justice, was sworn in as his successor. His opponent, Mark Ledwell, accused Lantz of using the resources of government to help his campaign; Lantz refused these claims. During the campaign, he received endorsements from the majority of PC caucus members. During debates, he supported building a tunnel from the province to Nova Scotia. Lantz won the election, defeating Ledwell. He was re-appointed as premier on February 9, 2026.

In November 2026, members of the PC party started a formal petition calling for Lantz to be removed as leader, claiming he had lost the confidence of the party. Lantz's critics pointed specifically to the growing deficit and the PCs' low polling numbers. 2026 opinion polls from firms Narrative Research and MQO put the PCs in third and second place, respectively, polling at 20% as of a September survey. Lantz acknowledged the petition and said he would continue his work, but criticized the petition's supporters for apparently wanting to "reverse a democratic decision that was made by this party" as regards his leadership.

== Personal life ==
Lantz lives in Charlottetown-Brighton with his wife, Kelly, and his two children. Rob Lantz is the brother of Jeff Lantz, a former Prince Edward Island MLA and current Provincial Court judge.

== Election results ==
=== 2026 Progressive Conservative Party of Prince Edward Island leadership election ===
Results
| Candidate | First ballot |
| Name | Percentage |
|---|---|
| Rob Lantz | 2,889 votes 53.1% |
| Mark Ledwell | 2,542 votes 46.9% |
| Total | 5,437 votes cast |

=== Charlettown-Brighton ===
2023 Prince Edward Island general election: Charlottetown-Brighton
| Party | Candidate | Votes | % | ±% |
|---|---|---|---|---|
| Progressive Conservative | Rob Lantz | 1,171 | 43.0 | +25.4 |
| Green | Janice Harper | 864 | 31.7 | −8.6 |
| Liberal | Sandra Sunil | 487 | 17.9 | −20.0 |
| New Democratic | Michelle Neill | 202 | 7.4 | +3.1 |
| Total valid votes | | 2,724 | 100.0 | |
| Progressive Conservative gain from Green | | Swing | | +17.0 |

2015 Prince Edward Island general election
| Party | Candidate | Votes | % | ±% |
|---|---|---|---|---|
| Liberal | Jordan Brown | 1,056 | 39.02 | −13.44 |
| Progressive Conservative | Rob Lantz | 1,032 | 38.14 | +8.28 |
| Green | Derrick Biso | 353 | 13.05 | +2.88 |
| New Democratic | Bob MacLean | 265 | 9.79 | +2.27 |
| Total valid votes | | 2,706 | 100.0 | |
| Liberal hold | | Swing | | −10.86 |
These results will be subject to a judicial recount.
