= Progressive Conservative Party of Prince Edward Island =

Provincial political party in Canada

- Abbreviation: PEIPC
- Leader: Rob Lantz
- President: Robert Larsen
- Vice President: Ricky Clow
- Founded: 1851; 175 years ago
- Headquarters: 30 Pond Street; Unit B Charlottetown, Prince Edward Island; C1A 9P2
- Membership (2026): 6,132
- Ideology: Progressive conservatism; Green conservatism; Red Toryism
- Colours: Blue
- Seats in Legislature: 18 / 27

Website
- peipc.ca

The Progressive Conservative Party of Prince Edward Island (PEIPC) is one of three major political parties on Prince Edward Island. The party and its rival, the Prince Edward Island Liberal Party, have alternated in power since responsible government was granted in 1851.

== History ==
The policies of the Liberals and Progressive Conservatives (PCs) are very similar. The major differences are in their allegiances to federal parties and in personalities. The PC Party began as the Conservative Party of Prince Edward Island, and changed its name in 1942 to reflect the development of the federal Progressive Conservative Party.

The Progressive Conservatives formed the government in Prince Edward Island under Premier Pat Binns, starting in 1996. The party lost its bid for a fourth mandate in 2007.

In October 2010, following the resignation of Binns as party leader (in 2007), a leadership election was held. Jim Bagnall became interim leader of the party in 2010 when previous interim leader MLA Olive Crane resigned the post to seek the permanent leadership of the party.

Crane won the PC leadership in October 2010, and served for over two years. She resigned as party leader on 31 January 2013, and was succeeded by Steven Myers as interim leader.

Rob Lantz was elected leader of the party at a leadership election on February 28, 2015, at the University of Prince Edward Island Sports Centre, but resigned on September 23, 2015, after failing to win a seat in the 2015 provincial election.

On October 15, 2015, the party chose Borden-Kinkora MLA Jamie Fox as interim leader

James Aylward, MLA for Stratford-Kinlock, defeated Brad Trivers and was chosen leader on October 19, 2017, replacing interim leader Jamie Fox.

On September 17, 2018, Aylward announced his pending resignation as leader, effective upon the election of his successor on February 9, 2019.

Dennis King was elected leader of the party, succeeding Aylward. King resigned in 2025 and was replaced by former leader Lantz as interim leader. Lantz then resigned to run in the 2026 leadership election and was replaced by Bloyce Thompson as interim leader. Lantz would defeat lawyer Mark Ledwell in the election, returning as PC leader and premier.

Traditionally, the Tories have done better among Protestant voters, while Liberals have had more support from Catholics. Politics on the island, however, has never been sectarian, and both parties have always had voters and members from both populations. Indeed, it has been the custom until recently for a Liberal incumbent of one denomination to be opposed by a Tory challenger of the same denomination and vice versa. This had tended to minimise religious sectarianism within the parties. The Liberals have also traditionally enjoyed the support of the province's small Acadian population concentrated in Prince County at the west end of the island. Progressive Conservative support has tended to be greater on the eastern half of the island.

== Current MLAs ==
- Zack Bell, Charlottetown-Winsloe
- Jill Burridge, Stratford-Keppoch
- Darlene Compton, Belfast-Murray River
- Robin Croucher, Souris-Elmira
- Brendan Curran, Georgetown-Pownal
- Cory Deagle, Montague-Kilmuir
- Tyler DesRoches, Summerside-Wilmot
- Susie Dillon, Charlottetown-Belvedere
- Kent Dollar, Brackley-Hunter River
- Rob Lantz, Charlottetown-Brighton
- Ernie Hudson, Alberton-Bloomfield
- Sidney MacEwen, Morell-Donagh
- Hilton MacLennan, Tyne Valley-Sherbrooke
- Matthew MacKay, Kensington-Malpeque
- Barb Ramsay, Summerside-South Drive
- Jenn Redmond, Mermaid-Stratford
- Bloyce Thompson, Stanhope-Marshfield
- Brad Trivers, Rustico-Emerald

== Electoral performance ==
Election	Leader	Votes	%	Seats	+/−	Position	Status
1931	James David Stewart	36,219	51.7	18 / 30	▲12	▲1st	Majority
1935	William J. P. MacMillan	31,840	42.1	0 / 30	▼18	▼2nd	Extra-parliamentary
1939	William J. P. MacMillan	35,600	47.0	3 / 30	▲3	2nd	Opposition
1943	William J. P. MacMillan	31,849	46.1	10 / 30	▲7	2nd	Opposition
1947	William J. P. MacMillan	36,661	45.3	6 / 30	▼4	2nd	Opposition
1951	Reginald Bell	36,921	46.7	6 / 30	Steady	2nd	Opposition
1955	Reginald Bell	36,705	45.0	3 / 30	▼3	2nd	Opposition
1959	Walter Russell Shaw	43,845	50.9	22 / 30	▲19	▲1st	Majority
1962	Walter Russell Shaw	44,707	50.6	19 / 30	▼3	1st	Majority
1966	Walter Russell Shaw	46,118	49.5	15 / 32	▼4	▼2nd	Opposition
1970	George Key	46,015	41.6	5 / 32	▼10	2nd	Opposition
1974	Melvin McQuaid	47,470	39.9	6 / 32	▲1	2nd	Opposition
1978	Angus MacLean	60,878	48.1	15 / 32	▲9	2nd	Opposition
1979	Angus MacLean	68,440	53.3	21 / 32	▲6	▲1st	Majority
1982	James Lee	71,274	53.7	21 / 32	Steady	1st	Majority
1986	James Lee	68,062	45.5	11 / 32	▼10	▼2nd	Opposition
1989	Mel Gass	50,731	35.8	2 / 32	▼9	2nd	Opposition
1993	Pat Mella	57,549	39.5	1 / 32	▼1	2nd	Opposition
1996	Pat Binns	37,910	47.4	18 / 27	▲17	▲1st	Majority
2000	Pat Binns	45,820	58.0	26 / 27	▲8	1st	Majority
2003	Pat Binns	43,712	54.29	23 / 27	▼3	1st	Majority
2007	Pat Binns	33,754	41.35	4 / 27	▼19	▼2nd	Opposition
2011	Olive Crane	29,950	40.18	5 / 27	▲1	2nd	Opposition
2015	Rob Lantz	30,663	37.39	8 / 27	▲3	2nd	Opposition
2019	Dennis King	30,415	36.73	13 / 27	▲5	▲1st	Minority (2019–20)
2019	Dennis King	30,415	36.73	13 / 27	▲5	▲1st	Majority (2020–23)
2023	Dennis King	41,828	55.92	22 / 27	▲9	1st	Majority

== Conservative and PC leaders ==
- Edward Palmer, 1851–1854
- John Holl, 1854–1855
- Edward Palmer, 1855–1863
- John Hamilton Gray, 1863–1865
- James Colledge Pope, 1865–1873
- Lemuel Cambridge Owen, 1873–1877
- William Wilfred Sullivan, 1877–1889
- Neil McLeod, 1889–1894
- Daniel Gordon, 1894–1903
- John Alexander Mathieson, 1903–1917
- Aubin E. Arsenault, 1917–1921
- James David Stewart, 1921–1933
- William J. P. MacMillan, 1933–1948
- Reginald Bell, 1948–1957
- Walter Shaw, 1957–1968
- George Key, 1968–1973
- Melvin McQuaid, 1973–1976
- Lloyd MacPhail, 1976 (interim)
- J. Angus MacLean, 1976–1981
- James M. Lee, 1981–1987
- Leone Bagnall, 1987–1988 (interim)
- Melbourne Gass, 1988–1990
- Pat Mella, 1990–1996
- Pat Binns, 1996–2007
- Olive Crane, 2007–2010 (interim)
- Jim Bagnall, 2010 (interim)
- Olive Crane, 2010–2013
- Steven Myers, 2013–2015 (interim)
- Rob Lantz, 2015
- Jamie Fox, 2015–2017 (interim)
- James Aylward, 2017–2019
- Dennis King, 2019–2025
- Rob Lantz, 2025 (interim)
- Bloyce Thompson, 2025–2026 (interim)
- Rob Lantz, 2026–present

== See also ==
- Progressive Conservative Party of Prince Edward Island leadership elections
- List of premiers of Prince Edward Island
- List of political parties in Canada
- Politics of Prince Edward Island
