= General Assembly of Prince Edward Island =

Canadian provincial government

General Assembly of Prince Edward Island Assemblée générale de l'Île-du-Prince-Édouard
- 67th General Assembly of Prince Edward Island

Type
- Type: Bicameral (1773–1893); Unicameral (1893–present)
- Houses: Legislative Council (1773–1893); House of Assembly (1773–1893); Legislative Assembly (1893–present)
- Sovereign: The lieutenant governor (representing the King of Canada)

History
- Founded: 1773; 253 years ago

Meeting place
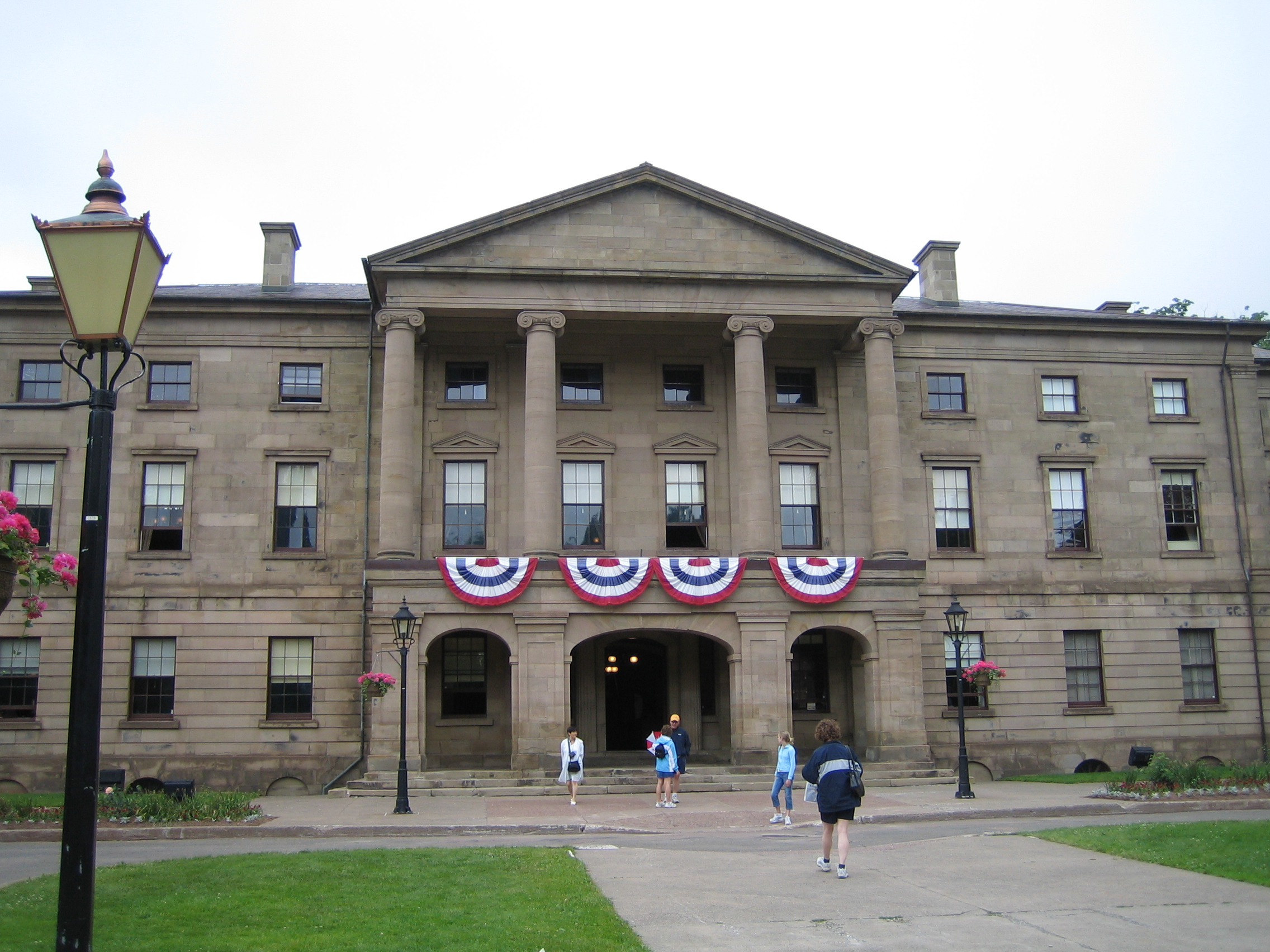
- Province House, Charlottetown, Prince Edward Island, Canada

The General Assembly of Prince Edward Island is the unicameral government of the province of Prince Edward Island, Canada, consisting of the lieutenant governor (representing the King of Canada) and the Legislative Assembly of Prince Edward Island. The legislature was first established in 1773.

Like the Canadian federal government, Prince Edward Island uses a Westminster-style parliamentary government, in which members are elected to the Legislative Assembly through general elections. The party with the most seats forms government but must obtain majority support to pass laws. A Premier of Prince Edward Island and Executive Council of Prince Edward Island are appointed by the lieutenant governor.

The legislature was originally bicameral, with an upper house called the Legislative Council of Prince Edward Island and a lower house called the House of Assembly of Prince Edward Island. The Legislative Council also held executive power until 1839. In 1893 the houses were amalgamated into the Legislative Assembly of Prince Edward Island. Unlike other provinces that eliminated their upper house, the assembly continued to have a distinction between members elected as councillors and members elected as assemblymen. This distinction was eliminated in 1996, giving all members the title Member of the Legislative Assembly, upon the change from dual ridings (two members per district) to single ridings (one member per district) in the Legislative Assembly.

== List of assemblies ==
Assembly	Period	Election	Dissolution
67th General Assembly of Prince Edward Island	2023–present	April 3, 2023	
66th General Assembly of Prince Edward Island	2019–2023	April 23, 2019	March 6, 2023
65th General Assembly of Prince Edward Island	2015–2019	May 4, 2015	March 26, 2019
64th General Assembly of Prince Edward Island	2011–2015	October 3, 2011	April 6, 2015
63rd General Assembly of Prince Edward Island	2007–2011	May 28, 2007	August 28, 2011
62nd General Assembly of Prince Edward Island	2003–2007	September 29, 2003	April 30, 2007
61st General Assembly of Prince Edward Island	2000–2003	April 17, 2000	September 2, 2003
60th General Assembly of Prince Edward Island	1996–2000	November 18, 1996	March 21, 2000
59th General Assembly of Prince Edward Island	1993–1996	March 29, 1993	October 21, 1996
58th General Assembly of Prince Edward Island	1989–1993	May 29, 1989	March 1, 1993
57th General Assembly of Prince Edward Island	1986–1989	April 21, 1986	February 13, 1989
56th General Assembly of Prince Edward Island	1982–1986	September 27, 1982	March 25, 1986
55th General Assembly of Prince Edward Island	1979–1982	April 23, 1979	August 31, 1982
54th General Assembly of Prince Edward Island	1978–1979	April 24, 1978	March 27, 1979
53rd General Assembly of Prince Edward Island	1974–1978	April 29, 1974	March 28, 1978
52nd General Assembly of Prince Edward Island	1970–1974	May 11, 1970	April 3, 1974
51st General Assembly of Prince Edward Island	1966–1970	May 30, 1966	March 26, 1970
50th General Assembly of Prince Edward Island	1962–1966	December 10, 1962	April 14, 1966
49th General Assembly of Prince Edward Island	1959–1962	September 1, 1959	November 8, 1962
48th General Assembly of Prince Edward Island	1955–1959	May 25, 1955	August 3, 1959
47th General Assembly of Prince Edward Island	1951–1955	April 26, 1951	April 27, 1955
46th General Assembly of Prince Edward Island	1947–1951	December 11, 1947	March 31, 1951
45th General Assembly of Prince Edward Island	1943–1947	September 15, 1943	October 27, 1947
44th General Assembly of Prince Edward Island	1939–1943	May 18, 1939	August 20, 1943
43rd General Assembly of Prince Edward Island	1935–1939	July 23, 1935	April 21, 1939
42nd General Assembly of Prince Edward Island	1931–1935	August 6, 1931	June 15, 1935
41st General Assembly of Prince Edward Island	1927–1931	June 25, 1927	July 2, 1931
40th General Assembly of Prince Edward Island	1923–1927	July 26, 1923	June 2, 1927
39th General Assembly of Prince Edward Island	1919–1923	July 24, 1919	June 23, 1923
38th General Assembly of Prince Edward Island	1915–1919	September 16, 1915	June 26, 1919
37th General Assembly of Prince Edward Island	1912–1915	January 3, 1912	August 21, 1915
36th General Assembly of Prince Edward Island	1908–1912	November 18, 1908	December 5, 1911
35th General Assembly of Prince Edward Island	1904–1908	December 7, 1904	October 15, 1908
34th General Assembly of Prince Edward Island	1900–1904	December 12, 1900	November 9, 1904
33rd General Assembly of Prince Edward Island	1897–1900	July 28, 1897	November 12, 1900
32nd General Assembly of Prince Edward Island	1893–1897	December 13, 1893	June 25, 1897
31st General Assembly of Prince Edward Island	1890–1893	January 30, 1890	November 18, 1893
30th General Assembly of Prince Edward Island	1886–1890	June 30, 1886	January 7, 1890
29th General Assembly of Prince Edward Island	1883–1886	May 8, 1882	June 5, 1886
28th General Assembly of Prince Edward Island	1879–1882	April 2, 1879	April 15, 1882
27th General Assembly of Prince Edward Island	1876–1879	August 10, 1876	March 12, 1879
26th General Assembly of Prince Edward Island	1873–1876	April 24, 1873	July 1, 1876
25th General Assembly of Prince Edward Island	1872–1873		
24th General Assembly of Prince Edward Island	1870–1872	April 19, 1870	
23rd General Assembly of Prince Edward Island	1867–1870		April 18, 1867
22nd General Assembly of Prince Edward Island	1863–1867		
21st General Assembly of Prince Edward Island	1859–1863		
20th General Assembly of Prince Edward Island	1854–1859		
19th General Assembly of Prince Edward Island	1854		
18th General Assembly of Prince Edward Island	1850–1854		
17th General Assembly of Prince Edward Island	1847–1850		
16th General Assembly of Prince Edward Island	1843–1847		
15th General Assembly of Prince Edward Island	1839–1843		
14th General Assembly of Prince Edward Island	1835–1839		
13th General Assembly of Prince Edward Island	1831–1835		
12th General Assembly of Prince Edward Island	1825–1831		
11th General Assembly of Prince Edward Island	1820–1825		
10th General Assembly of Prince Edward Island	1818–1820		
9th General Assembly of Prince Edward Island	1812–1818		
8th General Assembly of Prince Edward Island	1806–1812		
7th General Assembly of Prince Edward Island	1802–1806		
6th General Assembly of Prince Edward Island	1790–1802		
5th General Assembly of Prince Edward Island	1787–1790	August, 1787	
4th General Assembly of Prince Edward Island	1785–1787	March, 1785	
3rd General Assembly of Prince Edward Island	1779–1784	July, 1779	January, 1784
2nd General Assembly of Prince Edward Island	1774–1779	October 1, 1774	
1st General Assembly of Prince Edward Island	1773–1774	July 4, 1773	

== See also ==
- List of post-confederation Prince Edward Island general elections
