= 20th General Assembly of Prince Edward Island =

The 20th General Assembly of Prince Edward Island represented the colony of Prince Edward Island between September 26, 1854, and 1859.

The Assembly sat at the pleasure of the Governor of Prince Edward Island, Alexander Bannerman. Edward Thornton was elected speaker.

George Coles was Premier.

== Members ==
The members of the Prince Edward Island Legislature after the general election of 1854 were:

Riding	Name
1st Prince	James Yeo
	James Warburton
2nd Prince	Stanislaus F. Perry
	William E. Clark
3rd Prince	William W. Lord
	James Muirhead
1st Queens	George Coles
	Alexander Laird
2nd Queens	William McGill
	Robert Mooney
3rd Queens	William Douse
	Donald Munro
1st Kings	John Macintosh
	William Cooper
2nd Kings	Edward Whelan
	Joseph Dingwell
3rd Kings	Joseph Wightman
	Edward Thornton
Charlottetown	Francis Longworth
	Edward Palmer
Georgetown	Andrew A. McDonald
	Thomas Heath Haviland
Princetown	Donald Montgomery
	Thomas Heath Haviland
