= 21st General Assembly of Prince Edward Island =

The 21st General Assembly of Prince Edward Island represented the colony of Prince Edward Island between April 12, 1859, and 1863. An elected assembly had been dissolved by the governor earlier in 1859 because it could not choose a speaker.

The Assembly sat at the pleasure of the Governor of Prince Edward Island, Dominick Daly. Donald Montgomery was elected speaker.

Edward Palmer was Premier.

This was the last election while an appointed Legislative council was in operation. Before the next election in 1863, PEI switched to an elected Legislative Council operating alongside an elected House of Assembly.

== Members ==
The members of the Prince Edward Island Legislature after the general election of 1859 were:

Riding	Name	
1st Prince	Nicholas Conroy	
	Patrick Doyle	
2nd Prince	John Yeo	
	David Ramsay	
3rd Prince	James Yeo	
	Stanislaus F. Perry	
4th Prince	James C. Pope	
	Cornelius Howatt	
1st Queens	Donald Montgomery	
	Colin Holm	
2nd Queens	Alexander Laird	
	John Longworth	
3rd Queens	George Coles	
	Francis Kelly	
4th Queens	John H. Gray	
	William Douse	
1st Kings	John Knight	
	William Cooper	
2nd Kings	Edward Whelan	
	John Sutherland	
3rd Kings	Edward Thornton	
	Ronald Walker	
4th Kings	Joseph Wightman	
	Finlay McNeill	
Town and Royalty of Charlottetown	Edward Palmer	
	Daniel Davies	
Town and Royalty of Georgetown	Thomas Heath Haviland	
	Andrew A. McDonald	Roderick MacAulay after April 27, 1859
Town and Royalty of Princetown	George Sinclair	
	Donald Montgomery	

Note that the losing candidate for Georgetown and Royalty, Roderick MacAulay, petitioned the Prince Edward Island House of Assembly to complain about an undue election. Specifically, Roderick MacAulay claimed that a number of people had voted in the Georgetown / Georgetown Royalty electoral district who were not entitled to vote. As a result, the colonial government held a review of the eligibility of some of the voters. This review took place at the Georgetown courthouse starting on March 25, 1859. As a result of this review, Roderick MacAulay was declared elected by the House of Assembly in place of Andrew A. MacDonald on April 27, 1859. Roderick MacAulay took his seat in the House of Assembly the following day.
