= 16th General Assembly of Prince Edward Island =

The 16th General Assembly of Prince Edward Island represented the colony of Prince Edward Island between January 23, 1843, and 1847.

The Assembly sat at the pleasure of the Governor of Prince Edward Island, Henry Vere Huntley. Joseph Pope was elected speaker.

== Members ==
The members of the Prince Edward Island Legislature after the general election of 1843 were:

Riding	Name
1st Prince	James Yeo
	John Cambridge
2nd Prince	Alexander Rae
	Allan Fraser
3rd Prince	Joseph Pope
	Richard Hudson
1st Queens	Duncan Maclean
	George Coles
2nd Queens	J.S. Macdonald
	Alexander Macgregor
3rd Queens	Alexander Maclean
	William Douse
1st Kings	John Macintosh
	Donald McDonald
2nd Kings	William Cooper
	William Dingwell
3rd Kings	John Dalziel
	Joseph Wightman
Charlottetown	Edward Palmer
	Francis Longworth
Georgetown	Edward Thornton
	Roderick Macaulay
Princetown	Donald Montgomery
	William Beairsto
