= 18th General Assembly of Prince Edward Island =

The 18th General Assembly of Prince Edward Island represented the colony of Prince Edward Island between March 5, 1850, and 1854.

The Assembly sat at the pleasure of the Governor of Prince Edward Island, Donald Campbell. Alexander Rae was elected speaker.

Responsible government was granted to the island in 1851 and George Coles became the first Premier.

== Members ==
The members of the Prince Edward Island Legislature after the general election of 1850 were:

Riding	Name
1st Prince	James Warburton
	James Yeo
2nd Prince	Alexander Rae
	Allan Fraser
3rd Prince	William Lord
	Joseph Pope
1st Queens	George Coles
	Alexander Laird
2nd Queens	Robert Mooney
	Neil McNeill
3rd Queens	Benjamin Davies
	William Douse
1st Kings	Daniel Flynn
	Donald Beaton
2nd Kings	John Jardine
	Edward Whelan
3rd Kings	Edward Thornton
	John LaLacheur
Charlottetown	Edward Palmer
	Francis Longworth
Georgetown	Thomas Heath Haviland
	James Macdonald
Princetown	William E. Clark
	Donald Montgomery
