= 19th General Assembly of Prince Edward Island =

The 19th General Assembly of Prince Edward Island represented the colony of Prince Edward Island between February 9, 1854, and May 10, 1854.

The Assembly sat at the pleasure of the Governor of Prince Edward Island, Alexander Bannerman. John Jardine was elected speaker.

Edward Palmer, the leader of the Conservative Party, chose John Myrie Holl, a member of the Legislative Council, as Premier.

== Members ==
The members of the Prince Edward Island Legislature after the general election of 1854 were:

Riding	Name
1st Prince	James Yeo
	James Warburton
2nd Prince	Allan Fraser
	William E. Clark
3rd Prince	William W. Lord
	James H. Conroy
1st Queens	John McLeod
	George Beer
2nd Queens	Robert Mooney
	William McGill
3rd Queens	William Douse
	Benjamin Davies
1st Kings	Emmanuel McEachern
	Peter Macgowan
2nd Kings	John Jardine
	Edward Whelan
3rd Kings	Joseph Wightman
	John Goff
Charlottetown	Edward Palmer
	Francis Longworth
Georgetown	Roderick McAulay
	Thomas Heath Haviland
Princetown	Donald Montgomery
	James Mckay Thomas Heath Haviland (1854)
