= 17th General Assembly of Prince Edward Island =

The 17th General Assembly of Prince Edward Island represented the colony of Prince Edward Island between January 26, 1847, and 1850.

The Assembly sat at the pleasure of the Governor of Prince Edward Island, Henry Vere Huntley. Joseph Pope was elected speaker.

== Members ==
The members of the Prince Edward Island Legislature after the general election of 1847 were:

| Riding | Name |
|---|---|
| 1st Prince | Nicholas Conroy |
| | James Warburton |
| 2nd Prince | Alexander Rae |
| | Allan Fraser |
| 3rd Prince | Joseph Pope |
| | James Herron Conroy |
| 1st Queens | Duncan Maclean |
| | George Coles |
| 2nd Queens | John Longworth |
| | Robert Mooney |
| 3rd Queens | John Little |
| | John Macdougall |
| 1st Kings | John Macintosh |
| | Donald McDonald |
| 2nd Kings | John Jardine |
| | Edward Whelan |
| 3rd Kings | Edward Thornton |
| | John W. LeLacheur |
| Charlottetown | Edward Palmer |
| | Francis Longworth |
| Georgetown | Thomas Heath Haviland |
| | Hugh Macdonald |
| Princetown | Donald Montgomery |
| | William Clark |
