= 22nd General Assembly of Prince Edward Island =

The 22nd General Assembly of Prince Edward Island helped make laws for the colony of Prince Edward Island between March 3, 1863, and 1867. An elected Legislative Council was also in operation.

The Assembly sat at the pleasure of the Governor of Prince Edward Island, George Dundas. Thomas Heath Haviland was elected speaker.

John Hamilton Gray was Premier.

== Members ==
The members of the Prince Edward Island Legislature after the general election of 1863 were:

Riding	Name
1st Prince	Nicholas Conroy
	George W. Howlan
2nd Prince	John Yeo
	David Ramsay
3rd Prince	James Warburton
	George Sinclair
4th Prince	James C. Pope
	Cornelius Howatt
5th Prince	Colin McLennan
	James Muirhead
1st Queens	Donald Montgomery
	William Haslam
2nd Queens	John Longworth
	Alexander Laird
3rd Queens	George Coles
	Francis Kelly
4th Queens	John H. Gray
	William H. Pope
1st Kings	Joseph Hensley
	Donald Beaton
2nd Kings	Edward Whelan
	John Sutherland
3rd Kings	Edward Thornton
	Ronald Walker
4th Kings	David Kaye
	James Duncan
Charlottetown and Royalty	Daniel Davies
	Frederick de St. Croix Brecken
Georgetown and Royalty	Thomas Heath Haviland
	Roderick McAulay
