= 14th General Assembly of Prince Edward Island =

The 14th General Assembly of Prince Edward Island represented the colony of Prince Edward Island between January 26, 1835, and 1839.

The Assembly sat at the pleasure of the Governor of Prince Edward Island, Aretas William Young. George Dalrymple was elected speaker.

== Members ==
The members of the Prince Edward Island Legislature after the general election of 1835 were:

Riding	Name
Prince County	Joseph Pope
	John Ramsay
	Samuel Green
	William Lord
Queens County	George Dalrymple
	Samuel Nelson
	John Small MacDonald
	William Douse
Kings County	William Brennan
	Peter McCallum
	William Cooper
	John Le Lacheur
Charlottetown	Charles Binns
	Edward Palmer
Georgetown	Edward Thornton
	John W. James
Princetown	Thomas McNutt
	William Clarke
