= 15th General Assembly of Prince Edward Island =

The 15th General Assembly of Prince Edward Island represented the colony of Prince Edward Island between January 22, 1839, and 1843.

The Assembly sat at the pleasure of the Governor of Prince Edward Island, Charles Augustus FitzRoy. William Cooper was elected speaker.

== Members ==
The members of the Prince Edward Island Legislature after the general election of 1839 were:

Riding	Name
1st Prince	James Yeo
	Thomas Gorman
2nd Prince	Allan Fraser
	Alexander Rae
3rd Prince	Joseph Pope
	Richard Hudson
1st Queens	Charles Macneil
	Mungo Macfarlane
2nd Queens	John Small MacDonald
	Malcolm Forbes
3rd Queens	John Windsor Le Lacheur
	John Arbuckle
1st Kings	John Macintosh
	Donald McDonald
2nd Kings	William Cooper
	William Dingwell
3rd Kings	Vere Beck
	John Dalziel
Charlottetown	Edward Palmer
	Francis Longworth
Georgetown	John Thomson
	Joseph Dingwell
Princetown	William Clark
	Donald Montgomery
