= 8th General Assembly of Prince Edward Island =

The 8th General Assembly of Prince Edward Island represented the colony of Prince Edward Island between 10 August 1806 and 1812.

The Assembly sat at the pleasure of the Governor of Prince Edward Island, Joseph Frederick Wallet DesBarres. Robert Hodgson was elected speaker.

== Members ==
The members of the Prince Edward Island Legislature after the general election of 1806 were:

Riding	Name
Prince County	Robert Hodgson
	Charles Stewart
	David Murray
	Hugh Montgomery
Queens County	Ralph Brecken
	Angus McAulay
	Alexander McDonell
	Coundouly Rankin
Kings County	Peter Macgowan
	Elisha Coffin
	Benjamin Coffin
	John Stowe
Charlottetown	John F. Holland
	James B. Palmer
Georgetown	William Creed
	James Bagnall
Princetown	Charles Stewart
	James Townsend
