= 9th General Assembly of Prince Edward Island =

The 9th General Assembly of Prince Edward Island represented the colony of Prince Edward Island between August 10, 1812, and 1818.

The Assembly sat at the pleasure of the Governor of Prince Edward Island, William Townshend. Ralph Brecken was elected speaker; James Curtis became speaker after Brecken's death in 1813.

Townshend was named acting governor in August 1812; he was replaced by Charles Douglass Smith the following year.

== Members ==
The members of the Prince Edward Island Legislature after the general election of 1812 were:

| Riding | Name |
|---|---|
| Prince County | J.B. Palmer |
| | William Clark |
| | David Murray |
| | Daniel Montgomery |
| Queens County | Ralph Brecken |
| | William Hyde |
| | Angus McAulay |
| | William Duckendorff |
| Kings County | Lemuel Cambridge |
| | James Curtis |
| | Benjamin Coffin |
| | Charles Worrell |
| Charlottetown | Samuel Nelson |
| | George Birnie |
| Georgetown | Fade Goff |
| | John Gardiner |
| Princetown | Charles Stewart |
| | James Townsend |
