= Province House (Prince Edward Island) =

Seat of the Legislative Assembly of Prince Edward Island, Canada

Coordinates: 46.234927°N 63.126084°W

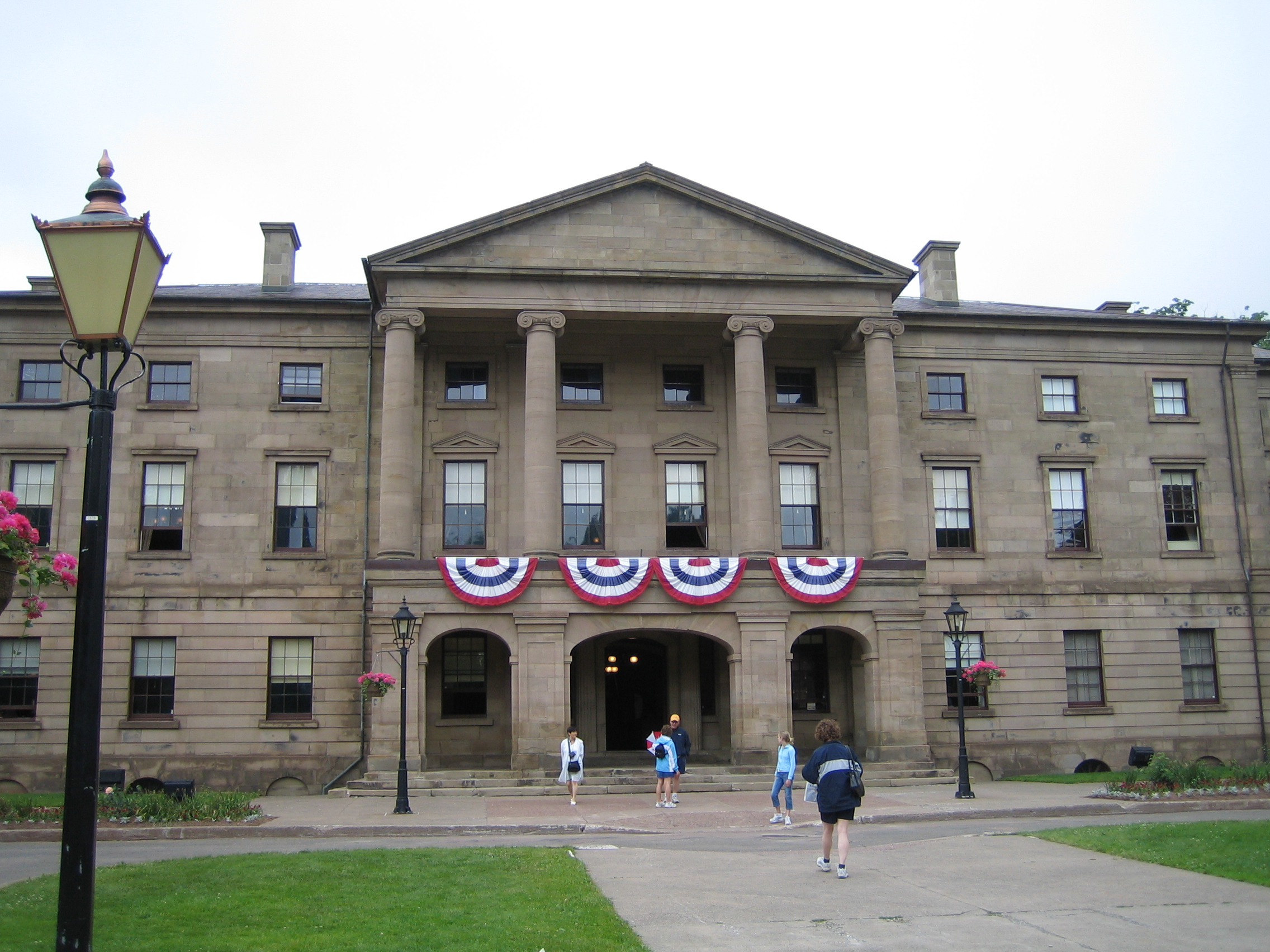
- Province House is Prince Edward Island's provincial legislature and a National Historic Site

General information
- Architectural style: Roman/Greek Revival
- Location: 165 Richmond Street, Charlottetown, Prince Edward Island, Canada
- Construction started: 1843; 183 years ago
- Inaugurated: 1847; 179 years ago

Design and construction
- Architect: Isaac Smith

National Historic Site of Canada
- Official name: Province House National Historic Site of Canada
- Designated: 1973

Prince Edward Island Heritage Place
- Type: Designated Heritage Place
- Designated: 2004

Province House is where the Prince Edward Island Legislature, known as the Legislative Assembly of Prince Edward Island, has met since 1847. The building is located at the intersection of Richmond and Great George Streets in Charlottetown; it is Canada's second-oldest seat of government.

== History ==
The cornerstone was laid in May 1843 and the building commenced operation for the first time in January 1847. The entire structure was built for a cost of £10,000 and was designed by Isaac Smith. Smith was a self-trained architect from Yorkshire, who also designed the residence of the Lieutenant Governor of Prince Edward Island. It was built by Island craftsmen during a time of prosperity for the colony. Its architectural lines include Greek and Roman influences, common to public buildings in North America built during this era.

From September 1–7, 1864, Province House had an important role in helping Prince Edward Island host the Charlottetown Conference which resulted in Canadian Confederation.

In 1973, Parks Canada approached the government of Prince Edward Island with a proposal for joint management and restoration of the structure in recognition of its important role in Canadian history. Under the ensuing agreement, both parties agreed to a 99-year period of joint management. Parks Canada paid for a C$3.5 million restoration from 1979–1983 which involved part of the building being restored to the 1864 period. The provincial legislature occupies one end of the building, whereas the restored Confederation Chamber displays the room where the Charlottetown Conference meetings occurred.

Confederation Chamber within Province House, August 2011

On April 20, 1995, a powerful pipe bomb exploded beneath a wooden wheelchair ramp on the north side of Province House, destroying glass in windows and causing some minor structural damage. Several passersby were injured and the explosion occurred only five minutes after an entire class of school children on a tour of the building had passed through the area. The bombing occurred only one day after the Oklahoma City bombing and is considered to be a copycat action. Responsibility was claimed by a group calling itself Loki 7; however, a subsequent police investigation and criminal court case blamed a single individual, Roger Charles Bell.

== Province House National Historic Site ==
Province House was designated a National Historic Site of Canada in 1973. It is one of only three provincial legislative buildings, along with Province House in Halifax and the Saskatchewan Legislative Building in Regina, to be so designated. Province House is also designated under the provincial Heritage Places Protection Act.

Visitors can tour the 1860s period rooms, which include displays about the Charlottetown Conference, the building and the Provincial Legislative Assembly. An audio-visual presentation about the Conference is available, titled "A Great Dream".

== Restoration ==
In 2015, Province House was closed for repairs and conservation work, expected to take several years, with the legislature moved to the adjacent Hon. George Coles Building. Parks Canada confirmed in May 2023 that repairs had been delayed, and it would not reopen that year as planned. The work was to replace outdated mechanical systems, address accessibility, and restore interior finishes. Through mid 2023, costs for the project stood at C$91.8 million dollars with work still incomplete. In November 2023, Charlottetown MP Sean Casey announced an additional C$46 million which was expected to complete the last two phases of construction. This brought the total cost of the project to C$138 million.

When Province House closed, the nearby Confederation Centre of the Arts opened a replica of the Confederation Chamber to allow visitors and students to experience the room. The Centre announced October 2, 2024, that the replica would close October 31 to allow some items to move back for the reopening of the original chamber in 2025. During the time it was open, the replica has hosted 160,000 guests.

Province House re-opened on October 24, 2026, with an official ribbon-cutting. The total cost of the restoration was approximately CA$138,000,000.

== Monuments and memorials ==
Charlottetown Veterans Memorial statue by G. W. Hill in front of Province House

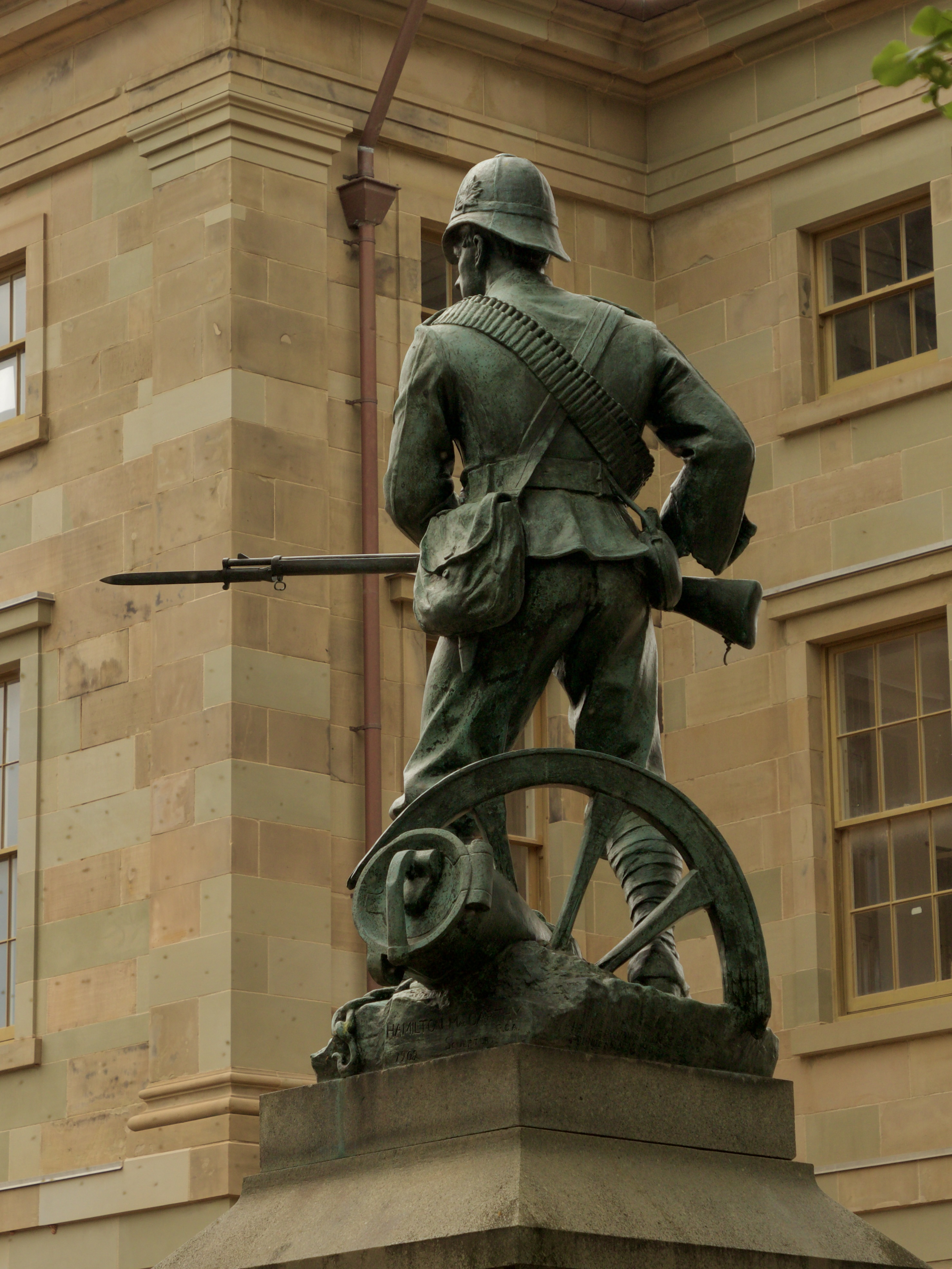
Boer War statue by Hamilton MacCarthy behind Province House

In front of the Grafton Street entrance is the Charlottetown Veterans Memorial which depicts three soldiers. The bronze memorial by G. W. Hill commemorated the dead from the World War I and was dedicated 16 July 1925. Later inscriptions were added for World War II and the Korean War. In 2014, an additional inscription was added to commemorate those lost in the Afghanistan War.

A Boer War Memorial by Hamilton MacCarthy was erected to honour the members of the Royal Canadian Regiment on the side of legislature.

A series of plaques commemorating the province's Fathers of Confederation are found along the northeast side of the building:

- Edward Whelan
- Thomas Heath Haviland
- Edward Palmer
- John Hamilton Gray
- Andrew Archibald Macdonald
- William Henry Pope
- George Coles

A small statue of Eckhart the Mouse from David Weale's children's story The True Meaning of Crumbfest is also located on the grounds of legislature. It was one of nine such statues placed around the city in 2009 to encourage students to explore historic sites in the area.
