= 12th General Assembly of Prince Edward Island =

The 12th General Assembly of Prince Edward Island represented the colony of Prince Edward Island between January 14, 1825, and 1831.

The Assembly sat at the pleasure of the Governor of Prince Edward Island, John Ready. John Stewart was elected speaker.

== Members ==
The members of the Prince Edward Island Legislature after the general election of 1825 were:

| Riding | Name |
|---|---|
| Prince County | Alexander Campbell |
| | Donald Montgomery |
| | John Stewart |
| | William McNeill |
| Queens County | Angus McAulay |
| | William Hyde |
| | Lemuel Cambridge |
| | Ewan Cameron |
| Kings County | Benjamin Coffin |
| | William Johnston |
| | John Jardine |
| | Thomas Owen |
| Charlottetown | Paul Mabey |
| | Robert Hodgson |
| Georgetown | William Dockendorff |
| | John McGregor |
| Princetown | Donald Stewart |
| | George Bearistoe |
