= 10th General Assembly of Prince Edward Island =

Canadian province Assembly, 1818 to 1820

The 10th General Assembly of Prince Edward Island represented the colony of Prince Edward Island between November 3, 1818, and 1820.

The Assembly sat at the pleasure of the Governor of Prince Edward Island, Charles Douglass Smith. Angus McAulay was elected speaker.

== Members ==
The members of the Prince Edward Island Legislature after the general election of 1818 were:

| Riding | Name |
|---|---|
| Prince County | Alexander Campbell |
| | David Murray |
| | Charles Binns |
| | William McNeill |
| Queens County | Angus McAulay |
| | William Hyde |
| | Ewan Cameron |
| | Lemuel Cambridge |
| Kings County | Benjamin Coffin |
| | James McLaren |
| | Charles Worrell |
| | Charles Kelly |
| Charlottetown | Samuel Nelson |
| | Paul Mabey |
| Georgetown | Thomas Alley |
| | Theophilus Chappell |
| Princetown | James Townsend |
| | Dugald Stewart |
