= 13th General Assembly of Prince Edward Island =

The 13th General Assembly of Prince Edward Island represented the colony of Prince Edward Island between February 3, 1831, and 1835.

The Assembly sat at the pleasure of the Governor of Prince Edward Island, John Ready. Ewan Cameron was elected speaker. Ready was replaced by Murray Maxwell as Governor later in 1831.

As of 1830, Roman Catholics were allowed to vote and hold office in the colony.

== Members ==
The members of the Prince Edward Island Legislature after the general election of 1831 were:

Riding	Name
Prince County	Samuel Green
	Thomas C. Compton
	Joseph Pope
	Patrick Cody
Queens County	Ewan Cameron
	Samuel Nelson
	John Small MacDonald
	Donald Macdonald
Kings County	Thomas Owen
	Daniel Brenan
Charlottetown	Charles Binns
	John Brecken
Georgetown	Hugh Macdonald
	Roderick McNeill
Princetown	William McNeill
