= 3rd General Assembly of Prince Edward Island =

The 3rd General Assembly of the Island of St. John represented the colony of Prince Edward Island, then known as St. John's Island, between 1779 and January 1784.

The Assembly sat at the pleasure of the Governor of St. John's Island, Walter Patterson. David Higgins was elected speaker; he was replaced by Walter Berry the following year.

== Members ==
The members of the legislature after the general election of July 1779 were:

Name
John Budd
James Campbell
David Higgins
Walter Berry
James Curtis
Thomas Mellish
David Lawson
Moses Delesdernier
John Webster
James Richardson
John Clark
Benjamin Chappell
Dugald Stewart
William Craig
Cornelius Higgins
William Warren
Thomas Hyde
Alexander Davidson
