= 11th General Assembly of Prince Edward Island =

The 11th General Assembly of Prince Edward Island represented Prince Edward Island between July 25, 1820, and 1825.

The Assembly convened the pleasure of the Governor of Prince Edward Island, Charles Douglass Smith. The speaker was Angus McAulay.

== Members ==
The following were members of this Assembly.

Riding	Name
Prince County	David Murray
	Alexander Campbell
	Donald Montgomery
Queens County	Angus McAulay
	William Hyde
	Lemuel Cambridge
	Ewan Cameron
Kings County	Charles Worrell
	Benjamin Coffin
	David McEwan
Charlottetown	Samuel Nelson
	Paul Mabey
Georgetown	Theophilus Chappell
	Samuel Bagnall
Princetown	Dugald Stewart
