= Ambrose Lane =

Canadian politician

Ambrose Lane (ca 1791 – September 7, 1853) was an Irish-born soldier, judge and political figure. He was administrator for Prince Edward Island from October 1850 to March 1851.

Lane was born in at Lanespark County Tipperary, at Lane's Park the son of Colonel John Hamilton Lane and Jane Hunt of the de Vere Hunts , whose family owned a neighbouring property called Glangoole . They were married in nearby Ballingary on 10 Feb 1782 .

He joined the 99th Foot (later the 98th Foot) in 1807, reaching the rank of lieutenant before he retired on half pay on Prince Edward Island in 1818, serving as captain in the island's militia. In 1817, he married Mary, the daughter of Charles Douglass Smith. Lane was named to the island's Council by his father-in-law in 1818. He was also appointed to several posts including registrar and master of the Court of Chancery. After calls for his removal by prominent residents of the island, Smith was replaced by John Ready in 1824. Lane was later named colonial secretary and assistant justice in the Supreme Court for the island. In 1839, he was named to the Executive Council created earlier in that year. Lane served as colonial administrator for the island, temporarily in September and October 1847 during the absence of Henry Vere Huntley and later following the death of Donald Campbell until Alexander Bannerman was named the new lieutenant governor. He died in Charlottetown in 1853.
