= 1st General Assembly of Prince Edward Island =

The 1st General Assembly of the Island of St. John assisted in the administration of the colony of Prince Edward Island, then known as St. John's Island, between July 7, 1773, and 1774. Its only session lasted just ten days.

The Assembly sat at the pleasure of the Governor of St. John's Island, Walter Patterson. Robert Stewart was elected Speaker.
