= 4th General Assembly of Prince Edward Island =

Government that represented the colony of Prince Edward Island between 1785 and 1787

The 4th General Assembly of the Island of St. John represented the colony of Prince Edward Island, then known as St. John's Island, between 1785 and 1787.

The Assembly sat at the pleasure of the Governor of St. John's Island, Walter Patterson.

An election was held in March 1784 and the elected members met on 6 March 1784. The assembly spent several weeks discussing the members' grievances against the Governor and then adjourned without Patterson's consent. The Governor declared that the assembly had dissolved itself and called a new election in March 1785.

Alexander Fletcher was chosen as speaker.

== Members ==
The members of the legislature after the general election of 1785 were:

Name
James Campbell
John Throckmorton
William Lawson
James Curtis
James McNutt
John Webster
Dugald Stewart
Alexander Fletcher
David Lawson
John Clark
William Craig
John Brecken
George Hardy
Cornelius Higgins
William Warren
William Douglas
William Schurman
Hugh Fraser
