= 2nd General Assembly of Prince Edward Island =

The 2nd General Assembly of the Island of St. John represented the colony of Prince Edward Island, then known as St. John's Island, between October 4, 1774, and 1779.

The Assembly sat at the pleasure of the Governor of St. John's Island, Walter Patterson. Robert Stewart was elected speaker.

== Members ==
The members of the legislature after the general election of October 1, 1774, were:

Name
Robert Stewart
John Budd
George Burns
Alexander Farquhar
Elisha Coffin
David Lawson
William Lawson
John Lord
William Craig
William Warren
John White
Robert Watson
Samuel Braddock
Benjamin Chappell
Adrian Van Brankle
James Richardson
John Webster
Cornelius Higgins
