= James Yeo =

James Yeo may refer to:

- James Lucas Yeo (1782–1818), British naval commander who served in the War of 1812
- James Yeo (politician) (1827–1903), merchant, ship builder, ship owner, and Canadian Member of Parliament for Prince Edward Island
- James Yeo (shipbuilder) (1789–1868), Cornish-born shipbuilder, merchant, farmer and political figure in Prince Edward Island
