= David Lawson =

David Lawson may refer to:

- David J. Lawson (1930–2007), American pastor
- David M. Lawson (born 1951), American judge
- David Lawson (politician), Scottish-Canadian politician
- David Lawson (footballer) (born 1947), former football goalkeeper
- Dave Lawson (born 1978), Australian comedian
- David G. Lawson (born 1946), member of the Delaware Senate
