= Alexander Rae (politician) =

Canadian politician

Speaker of the Legislative Assembly of Prince Edward Island
- In office 1850–1853
- Preceded by: Joseph Pope
- Succeeded by: John Jardine

Personal details
- Citizenship: Canadian
- Profession: Politician

Alexander Rae was the speaker of 18th Legislative Assembly of Prince Edward Island from 1850 to 1853. He was the speaker during all five sessions of the assembly.
