= Coun Douly Rankin =

Canadian politician

Coun Douly (Condulli) Rankin (ca 1774 – February 4, 1852) was a Scottish-born army officer and political figure in Prince Edward Island. He represented Queens County in the Legislative Assembly of Prince Edward Island from 1806 to 1812.

He was born at Breachacha Castle on the island of Coll, the son of Neil Rankin, the resident piper at the castle, and Catherine Maclean. He was trained as a piper but instead joined the army. In 1804, Rankin was named a temporary lieutenant in the New Brunswick Fencibles; later that year, he married Flora Morison. He was sent to Prince Edward Island in 1806, where he recruited additional men. In 1811, the Fencibles became the 104th Foot and later that year Rankin was made lieutenant. He also served as a justice of the peace. After being put on half pay, Rankin left the island in 1816 and settled on the Isle of Mull where he married Margaret Maclaine in 1818; his first wife had died in 1814.

In 1820, he returned to Prince Edward Island with a group of immigrants. He was named high sheriff for the island and so was responsible for collecting quitrents for Lieutenant Governor Charles Douglass Smith. In 1829, he was named major for the island's militia. He ran unsuccessfully against William Douse, a land agent, for a seat in the provincial assembly in 1834. Rankin helped organize the tenants against the landowners; this eventually led to him being evicted from the farm that he had been renting and he moved to Charlottetown. He died there in 1852.
