= Edward Thornton (politician) =

Canadian politician from Prince Edward Island (fl.1854–1858)

Speaker of the Legislative Assembly of Prince Edward Island
- In office 1854–1858
- Preceded by: John Jardine
- Succeeded by: Donald Montgomery

Personal details
- Citizenship: Canadian
- Profession: Politician

Edward Thornton was the speaker of 20th Legislative Assembly of Prince Edward Island from 1854 to 1858. He was the speaker during all the four sessions of the assembly.
