= Alexander Laird Jr. =

Canadian politician (1830–1896)

Alexander Laird (1830 – August 9, 1896) was a farmer and political figure in Prince Edward Island. He represented 4th Prince in the Legislative Assembly of Prince Edward Island from 1867 to 1870 and served in the Legislative Council from 1874 to 1882 and from 1886 to 1896 as a Liberal member.

== Early life ==
Alexander Laird Jr. was born in New Glasgow, Prince Edward Island, the son of Janet Orr and Alexander Laird, and grew up there. He established himself as a farmer in Wilmot Valley.

== Career ==
Laird ran unsuccessfully for a seat in the provincial assembly in 1882. He helped found the Agricultural Mutual Fire Insurance Company and served as its president. He was also president of the Farmers and Dairymen's Association. Laird was president of a Summerside newspaper, the Pioneer. He served in the provincial cabinet from 1891 until his death.

== Personal life ==
Laird married Rebecca P. Read in 1864. They had 12 children. His wife died in 1882. In 1884, Laird married Ann Carruthers. Laird lived in Bedeque. He died on August 9, 1896, in Wilmot Valley.

Laird's brother David served in the House of Commons and as Lieutenant-Governor for the Northwest Territories. His brother William also served in the provincial assembly.
