= John Frederick Holland =

Canadian politician

John Frederick Holland (October 27, 1764 – December 17, 1845) was an army officer, surveyor and political figure in Prince Edward Island. He represented Charlottetown in the Legislative Assembly of Prince Edward Island from 1803 to 1812.

He was born at Observation Cove (later Holland Cove), the son of Samuel Holland, while his father was surveying St. John's Island (later Prince Edward Island). He joined the Royal Navy in 1777 and, in 1779, joined the King's Royal Regiment of New York, reaching the rank of Lieutenant. After Holland left the army in 1783, he joined a survey team laying out settlements west of the Ottawa River and later worked on establishing the border between Quebec and New Brunswick. Holland married Mary Emily Tissable sometime before 1790. He became a lieutenant in Prince Edward's regiment and assisted in the construction of the citadel at Halifax.

After getting himself into trouble there, he was sent to Charlottetown, where he served as justice of the peace and high sheriff. By accusing the Loyal Electors, a political group, of being a seditious secret society, Holland succeeded in having James Bardin Palmer, one of the group's leading members, removed from his various appointments and was himself named adjutant general of militia. He was named to the Legislative Council in 1815. He was removed from the council in 1819 following allegations by Governor Charles Douglass Smith related to Holland's membership in the Masonic lodge in Charlottetown. Holland was unsuccessful in later attempts at re-election and was forced to sell much of his property after he was dropped from his post in the militia. He resigned as justice of the peace in 1841 and died in Charlottetown four years later. He was predeceased by his son Samuel John Holland (1822) and wife (1831), but survived by his two other sons and daughters.
