= John Arbuckle (disambiguation) =

Jon Arbuckle is a character in Garfield.

John or Jon Arbuckle may also refer to:

- John Arbuckle (businessman) (1838–1912), American businessman
- John Arbuckle (politician), see 15th General Assembly of Prince Edward Island
- John Arbuckle of John Arbuckle v. Joseph E Blackburn, see List of United States Supreme Court cases, volume 191
