= James Conroy =

James Conroy can refer to:

- James H. Conroy, member of 19th General Assembly of Prince Edward Island in 1854
- James Gervé Conroy (1838–1915), Irish-born Canadian politician in Newfoundland
- James Conroy, Irish republican militant in The Squad (Irish Republican Army unit) in 1919
- James J. Conroy, owner of American KTVO TV-station in 1955–1964
- Jim Conroy (Canadian football) (1937–2011), Canadian football player
- James Conroy (archer), Irish archer
- James Conroy, British mixed martial fighter, lost to Joseph Duffy (fighter) in 2013
- James “Jim” Conroy, current C.E.O. of Ross Stores since February 2025, former C.E.O. of Boot Barn from 2012 to 2025.

== See also ==
- James Conroy-Ward (born 1947), English music publisher and former actor
- Tim Conroy (Timothy James Conroy, born 1960), former American baseball player
- Will Conroy (William James Conroy, born 1982), American baseball player
