= William Townshend (colonial governor) =

Canadian politician

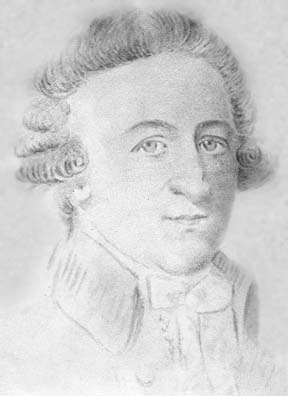
Pencil drawing of William Townshend by an unknown artist

William Townshend (c. 1745 {some sources state 1762} – December 5, 1816) was a British politician and office holder, operating mainly in the colony of Prince Edward Island. One of his duties was Acting colonial Governor of Prince Edward Island between August 5, 1812, and July 24, 1813.

== Early and Private Life ==
Townshend's birthplace is unknown. His father was Richard Townshend of Wrexham (presumably Wrexham in Wales, though other evidence suggests a place in England, possibly Wexham, Buckinghamshire).

He married Flora Stewart (b.1767 d.1843), the daughter of Chief Justice Peter Stewart, in c. 1790, and together they had eight children:

- Cecil Wray Townshend (1791 – 1870)
- Lt. William James Townshend (1796 – 1833)
- Peter Stewart Townshend (1798 – 1860s)
- John Dalton Townshend (1800 – abt.1873)
- Ester Wray Townshend (1802 – ????)
- Charles James Townshend (1804 – abt.1833)
- Helen Diana Townshend (???? – ????)
- Canon Rev. George Townshend (1810 – 1895)

== Threat of Government Scandal ==
Much of William Townshend's early life is unclear, up until the point when he became collector of customs and naval officer for St. John's Island (today known as Prince Edward Island). Speculation states that Townshend may have obtained the appointment because of a family connection with George Townshend, 1st Marquess Townshend, although others have said that Townshend had many connections with powerful officials in England.

Townshend arrived on the island in 1784 and was appointed to the Executive Council that December. Tension was soon built between Townshend and the island's colonial governor, Walter Patterson, who may have been angry that Townshend's appointment had come directly from the British Administration, Lord Sydney, the Home Secretary.

Townshend had a secure place with the government of the colony, and was soon involved in Patterson's scheme to seize land from absentee landlords. Being a member of the council, he was present when legislation was passed on the land seizures, which had gone against the British government. A report was written and charges were brought to Townshend, as well as to many other officials.

However, Townshend had still objected to the measures of the legislation, and had resigned. When the British Privy Council concluded its report in 1789, Townshend, who had resumed his seat in April 1787, was reported as being innocently drawn into the affair, and was permitted to keep his job, one of only a handful in the colony to do so. Governor Patterson, however, was removed from office in late 1789 and was replaced by Edmund Fanning. (Some sources show that Patterson was officially dismissed from office by Lord Sydney in the Spring of 1787.)

== Collector of Customs ==
As collector of customs, Townshend had his own bout of troubles in the colony. He crossed Governor Patterson in 1786 when he seized the property of merchants who had imported goods from the United States with Patterson's permission. Townshend was even accused of smuggling himself, by John Cambridge, a merchant, who had stated that Townshend had permitted smuggling from the Magdalen Islands. In 1788, an investigation by the commissioners of customs cleared Townshend of any wrongdoing.

It is probable that the most important seizure ever conducted by Townshend was on Walter Patterson himself, in June 1788, when Patterson had already been ousted from office. Townshend arrived with soldiers on Patterson's farm, where the smuggling was taking place in the dead of night, making it illegal smuggling, but clashing broke out between the soldiers and about 25 of Patterson's men, mostly servants. However, the goods and the schooner used to transport them were eventually seized and sold off at the order of the Vice admiralty court. Townshend took part of several seizures over the following years, including property belonging to John Cambridge and other merchants.

In 1791, Cambridge, other merchants and even some absentee landlords named Townshend as one of the men trying to form an illegal faction to rule the island. Townshend was also accused, among other allegations, of operating oppressive seizures. Townshend also accused the merchants of wrongdoing, and a stalemate was created between Townshend and the merchants.

An investigation was later heard in London, where Townshend presented a detailed defense but it does not appear that he impressed the investigating committee. However, the following year, the charges against Townshend were dropped. The number of smuggling cases in Island courts considerably dropped over the following years.

When Fanning had first arrived on the island, in 1786, Townshend was found amongst those who wanted Patterson out of office. Fanning even praised Townshend to the British government, stating that Townshend was a very loyal servant to the measures of the government. This statement, together with Townshend's actions in exposing Patterson in 1788, may well be considered part of William Pitt's campaign to stiffen up Customs regulations and to clear up smuggling that had become rampant under Lord North's ministry. However, with the multitude of accusations brought against Townshend, it is clear that his actions were not well-received locally.

== "Temporary Commander in Chief" ==
Later in life, Townshend wished to seek a more high-profile position within the government, but his attempts failed, and so did his health. However, in spite of illness, Townshend was named "Temporary Commander in Chief" (Acting Governor) of Prince Edward Island in 1812 following the removal of Governor Joseph Frederick Wallet DesBarres. Townshend was chosen for the job over senior councilor Thomas DesBrisay. William Townshend was so ill by the time he became Acting Governor, that he had to gather the strength to raise himself out of bed to sign in his new position.

Townshend's short time in office, lasting less than a year, was very uneventful, for he mainly followed the instructions of the Colonial Office. By the time he was replaced by Charles Douglass Smith as Governor on July 24, 1813, Townshend was quite satisfied with what he had accomplished on Prince Edward Island.

Illness overwhelming him, William Townshend died in 1816 on a visit to Plymouth, England.

Preceded by William Allanby (officially William Allanby from 1765 but noted vacant from 1774 to 1783)	Collector of Customs of Prince Edward Island; 1784 –	Succeeded by unknown
Preceded by Joseph Frederick Wallet DesBarres	(Acting) Governor of Prince Edward Island; 1812 – 1813	Succeeded by Charles Douglass Smith
