= William Laird (Canadian politician) =

Canadian politician

William Laird (June 5, 1835 – February 13, 1911) was a farmer and political figure on Prince Edward Island. He represented 2nd Queens in the Legislative Assembly of Prince Edward Island from 1908 to 1911 as a Liberal.

He was born in New Glasgow, Prince Edward Island, the son of Alexander Laird and Janet Orr. Laird married Eliza Jane Bradshaw in 1866. He served in the militia, reaching the rank of captain. He ran unsuccessfully for a seat in the provincial assembly in 1882. Laird resigned his seat in the assembly in 1911 due to poor health and died later that year in New Glasgow at the age of 75.

His brothers Alexander and David also served in the assembly; David was also a member of the Canadian House of Commons and Lieutenant-Governor of the North West Territories.
