= Frederick Walter Hyndman =

Canadian politician

The Honourable Frederick Walter Hyndman

18th Lieutenant Governor of Prince Edward Island
- In office March 31, 1958 – August 1, 1963
- Monarch: Elizabeth II
- Governors General: Vincent Massey; Georges Vanier
- Premier: Alex W. Matheson; Walter R. Shaw
- Preceded by: Thomas William Lemuel Prowse
- Succeeded by: Willibald Joseph MacDonald

Personal details
- Born: February 13, 1904 Charlottetown, Prince Edward Island
- Died: October 12, 1995 (aged 91) Charlottetown, Prince Edward Island
- Spouse: Norah Cecile (m. 1934)
- Children: Nancy, Frederick, and John
- Education: Prince of Wales College
- Occupation: Insurance company executive
- Profession: Politician

Frederick Walter Hyndman (February 13, 1904 – October 12, 1995) was an insurance company executive and political figure on Prince Edward Island. He served as the 18th Lieutenant Governor of Prince Edward Island from March 1958 to August 1963.

He was born in Charlottetown, the son of Walter Eardley Hyndman and Winnifred Sarah Cotton, and was educated at Prince of Wales College. In 1934, Hyndman married Norah Cecile Shannon. He served as a major during World War II. Hyndman ran unsuccessfully for a seat in the provincial assembly in the riding of 5th Queens in 1955.

He was president of Hyndman & Company Ltd (established in 1872).
