= Edward Reilly (Prince Edward Island politician) =

Canadian politician and journalist

Edward Reilly (c. 1839 - March 29, 1872) was a journalist and politician in Prince Edward Island.

Reilly replaced Edward Whelan in the assembly after a by-election in 1867.
