= John Jardine (Prince Edward Island politician) =

Canadian politician

Speaker of the Legislative Assembly of Prince Edward Island
- In office 1854–1854
- Preceded by: Alexander Rae
- Succeeded by: Edward Thornton

Personal details
- Citizenship: Canadian
- Profession: Politician

John Jardine was the speaker of 19th Legislative Assembly of Prince Edward Island in 1854.
