= Jedediah Slason Carvell =

Canadian politician

The Honourable Jedediah Slason Carvell
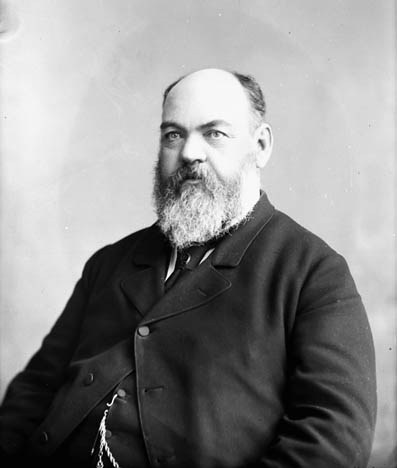

Senator for Charlottetown, Prince Edward Island
- In office 18 December 1879 – 3 July 1889
- Nominated by: John A. Macdonald

5th Lieutenant Governor of Prince Edward Island
- In office 2 September 1889 – 14 February 1894
- Monarch: Victoria
- Governors General: The Lord Stanley of Preston; The Earl of Aberdeen
- Premier: William Wilfred Sullivan; Neil McLeod; Frederick Peters
- Preceded by: Andrew Archibald Macdonald
- Succeeded by: George William Howlan

Personal details
- Born: 16 March 1832 Newcastle, New Brunswick Colony
- Died: 14 February 1894 (aged 61) Charlottetown, Prince Edward Island, Dominion of Canada
- Party: Conservative
- Spouse: Alice Caroline Hanford (m. 1861)
- Children: three sons
- Education: Fredericton High School
- Occupation: businessman
- Profession: Politician

Jedediah Slason Carvell (16 March 1832 – 14 February 1894) was a Canadian businessman, politician, and office holder.

== Accomplishments ==
From 1877 to 1878, he was the sixth Mayor of Charlottetown. He was also Spain's vice-consul in Prince Edward Island.

In 1879, he was summoned to the Senate of Canada representing the senatorial division of Charlottetown, Prince Edward Island. A Conservative, he resigned in 1889 when he was appointed the fifth Lieutenant Governor of Prince Edward Island. He served until his death in 1894.
