= James Colledge Pope =

Canadian politician

The Honourable James Pope PC
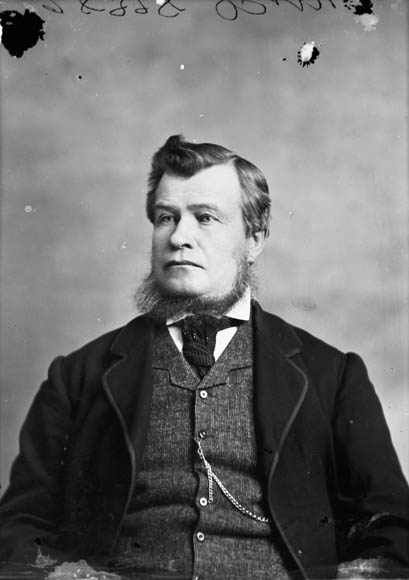

Premier of Prince Edward Island
- In office 1865–1867
- Monarch: Victoria
- Lieutenant Governor: George Dundas
- Preceded by: John Hamilton Gray
- Succeeded by: George Coles
- In office 1870–1872
- Monarch: Victoria
- Lieutenant Governor: Sir Robert Hodgson
- Preceded by: Robert Haythorne
- Succeeded by: Robert Haythorne

1st Premier of Prince Edward Island
- In office 1873–1873
- Monarch: Victoria
- Lieutenant Governor: Sir Robert Hodgson
- Preceded by: Robert Haythorne (colonial)
- Succeeded by: Lemuel Owen

Leader of the Conservative Party of Prince Edward Island
- In office 1865–1873
- Preceded by: John Hamilton Gray
- Succeeded by: Lemuel Owen

Member of the Canadian Parliament for Prince County
- In office 1873–1874 Serving with James Yeo
- Preceded by: None
- Succeeded by: Stanislaus Francis Perry

Member of the Canadian Parliament for Queen's County
- In office 1876–1882 Serving with Peter Sinclair (1876–1878); Frederick de St Croix Brecken (1878–1882)
- Preceded by: David Laird
- Succeeded by: Louis Henry Davies & John Theophilus Jenkins

Personal details
- Born: June 11, 1826 Bedeque, Prince Edward Island Colony
- Died: May 18, 1885 (aged 58) Summerside, Prince Edward Island, Canada
- Party: Prince Edward Island Conservative
- Other political affiliations: Conservative
- Spouse: Eliza Pethick (m. 1852)
- Relations: Joseph Pope (father), William Henry Pope (brother)
- Children: 8
- Cabinet: Minister of Marine and Fisheries (1878–1882)

James Colledge Pope, PC (June 11, 1826 – May 8, 1885) was a Canadian politician and businessman who served as Premier of Prince Edward Island on three occasions from 1865 to 1867, 1870 to 1872, and 1873. He oversaw the start of construction for the Prince Edward Island Railway and Prince Edward Island joining the Canadian Confederation. He served in the House of Commons of Canada and was Minister of Marine and Fisheries.

== Early life ==
James Colledge Pope was born in Bedeque, Prince Edward Island, on 11 June 1826, to Joseph Pope and Lucy Colledge. His father was active in the timber industry and served in the House of Assembly of Prince Edward Island for over twenty years. He was initially educated on the island before going to Saltash at age 14 to continue his education.

== Business ==
In 1849, Pope left Prince Edward Island to participate in the California gold rush and was among 40 people who bought the brig Fanny to sail there. None of the participants became rich and Pope returned to Prince Edward Island after contracting camp fever.

Pope established a store in Summerside, Prince Edward Island, and operated a packet boat between Bedeque and Shediac. Pope was appointed collector of customs for the district of Bedeque in 1851. He worked for at his father's shipyard in the 1840s, but was not personally involved in the shipbuilding and sold the shipbuilding yards of Bedeque and Summerside for £650 and £2,500 on 28 January 1867. He owned a telegraph line between Summerside and New Brunswick.

In 1868, Pope's 7,413 acre estate with 124 tenants was bought by the government.

== Politics ==
=== First government ===
A by-election was held for the 3rd district of Prince County in the House of Assembly on 1 June 1857. Pope defeated Liberal nominee William Warren Lord. Edward Palmer formed a government in 1859, and appointed Pope to the Executive Council.

Uniting the provinces of British North America into one federation became an issue in the 1860s. John Hamilton Gray, a supporter of confederation, ousted Palmer as premier in 1863 with the support of Pope. However, further disputes over the issue of confederation led to Palmer and Gray resigning from the Executive Council. Pope became premier on 7 January 1865.

William Henry Pope, Pope's brother, was a strong supporter of confederation. Pope initially did not take a strong stance on the issue and stated that he approved of the abstract idea. However, in 1866 he presented a resolution to the assembly which stated that no union would be satisfactory. William resigned from the government in protest. Palmer suggested that Prince Edward Island send an anti-confederation delegation to London in support of Joseph Howe, but Pope rejected this.

Samuel Cunard, who owed 15% of the land in Prince Edward Island, died in 1865. Pope's government purchased Cunard's estate on 1 July 1866, and around 1,000 tenants on these lands became freeholders.

Pope did not seek reelection in 1867, and the Tories lost the election. Palmer blamed the Tories' defeat on the government calling troops from Halifax to suppress the Tenant League in 1865.

=== Second government ===
A by-election was held for 5th Prince in 1868. Pope ran, but was defeated by Angus McMillan. The Liberals under the leadership of Robert Haythorne won a majority of the seats in the 1870 election. However, Haythorne was unable to form a government. Pope won a by-election for 4th Prince and formed a government made up of Conservatives and Liberals.

The construction of the Prince Edward Island Railway was pushed by Pope. However, the railway was a major financial burden and made confederation with Canada the only option besides bankruptcy. Approval for the railway fell and James Duncan, the new chair of the railway commission, lost a by-election to David Laird, who was against the railway, on 5 July 1871.

The assembly reconvened in March 1872, and Pope's majority ceased to exist. The Liberals won a general election that was held on 4 April.

=== Third government ===
Haythorne formed a government and reached an agreement for Prince Edward Island to join the confederation. The railway would be taken over by the confederation, Prince Edward Island's debts would be assumed, and the proposed annual subsidy was increased. A general election was called for 2 April 1873, and Pope ran a campaign stating that the terms for confederation were not good enough. Pope won 20 of the 30 seats in the assembly.

Pope refused to pledge to bring Prince Edward Island into the confederation regardless of how future negotiations ended. He was able to increase the subsidy to Prince Edward Island to $25,500. Prince Edward Island joined the Dominion of Canada on 1 July 1873.

Pope received support from all 12 Catholic members of the assembly by offering concessions which would be maintained after confederation due to section 93 of the Constitution Act, 1867. This section stated that all laws established prior to the union would be protected by the new government. Bishop Peter McIntyre wanted to block confederation until the issue of Catholic schools was resolved. Pope rescinded an informal promise of $10,000 to the bishop's schools, but later made a private gift of $5,000 after McIntyre protested. McIntyre was not pleased by this and denounced Pope from the pulpit in August 1873. McIntyre gave his support to the Liberals, who won 4 of the 6 by-elections held on 17 September.

=== Later career ===
On 17 September 1873, Pope was elected to the House of Commons of Canada and supported John A. Macdonald's government. He did not run in the 1874 election.

Pope returned to the assembly after winning a by-election on 5 April 1875. He lost his seat in the 1876 election.

Pope returned to the House of Commons after winning a by-election on 22 November 1876. After the Conservatives won the 1878 election Pope was made Minister of Marine and Fisheries. Pope's health worsen after the death of William in 1879, and he took a leave of absence from the cabinet in 1881. He was treated by Charles Tupper, but did not improve. He did not run in the 1882 election.

== Personal life ==
Although Pope was baptized into Methodism, he practiced Anglicanism for over thirty years. Pope married Eliza Pethick on 12 October 1852, and fathered eight children. His son Percy had him declared of unsound mind. He died in Summerside on 18 May 1885.

== Electoral history ==
Canadian federal by-election, 29 September 1873
Party	Candidate	Votes	Elected	
Conservative	James Colledge Pope	acclaimed		X
Liberal	James Yeo	acclaimed		X
Called as a result of Prince Edward Island joining Confederation 1 July 1873

== Works cited ==
- Holman, H. (1990). "Pope, Joseph". Dictionary of Canadian Biography. Archived from the original on 23 May 2026.
- Robertson, Ian (1982). "Pope, James Colledge". Dictionary of Canadian Biography. Archived from the original on 15 February 2026.
