= David Higgins (merchant) =

Canadian politician

Speaker of the Legislative Assembly of Prince Edward Island
- In office 1779–1780
- Preceded by: Robert Stewart
- Succeeded by: Walter Berry

Personal details
- Born: before 1760
- Died: April 1783 Charlottetown
- Citizenship: Canadian
- Profession: Merchant

David Higgins (before 1760 – April 1783) was a ship's captain, merchant, early settler and political figure on St John's Island (later Prince Edward Island).

Higgins was captain of a fishing boat operating in the Gulf of Saint Lawrence during the 1760s. With two other merchants, he acquired Lot 59 on St John's Island in 1767. He formed a partnership with James William Montgomery, Scotland's lord advocate, to develop this property. Higgins was one of the first members of the Legislative Council but was dismissed in 1773 for lack of attendance. In 1773, he married Elizabeth, the daughter of Boston merchant Job Prince. Higgins operated a store at Georgetown, built a sawmill and gristmill and settled a number of tenants on his property. He was elected to the Legislative Assembly of Prince Edward Island and was chosen as speaker in 1779 but resigned in March of the following year.

After experiencing financial losses and losing his property, his business and finally his wife, Higgins began drinking heavily and contracted a fever that led to his death in Charlottetown in 1783.
