= John Stewart (Prince Edward Island politician) =

Canadian politician

John Stewart (ca 1758 – June 22, 1834) was a Scottish-born army officer and political figure on Prince Edward Island. He served in the Legislative Assembly of Prince Edward Island from 1787 to 1801 and from 1824 to 1831.

He was born in Kintyre, the son of Peter Stewart and Helen MacKinnon, and came to St. John's Island (later Prince Edward Island) with his family in 1775. Stewart served as a lieutenant in the military corps defending the island during the American Revolution. He was elected to the assembly in an election held in March 1784 and chosen as speaker; the governor Walter Patterson dissolved this assembly because the majority of those elected were opposed to him and called a new election; Stewart was not reelected. He was elected again in 1787 after Patterson was replaced by Edmund Fanning as governor. In 1790, Stewart was named receiver general of quitrents. He served as speaker for the assembly from 1795 to 1801 and again from 1825 to 1831. Stewart played a prominent role in lobbying for the recall of governor Joseph Frederick Wallet DesBarres and his successor Charles Douglass Smith. He was named receiver general for quitrents again in 1828 and served until his death six years later. He was opposed to giving the vote to Roman Catholic islanders.

Stewart was married three times: to Hannah Turner in 1780, to Mary Ann James in 1817 and to Mary Rain in 1832. He died at his residence Mount Stewart overlooking the Hillsborough River in 1834.

He was the author of An account of Prince Edward Island, in the Gulph of St. Lawrence, North America ... published in 1806.

Stewart was named a National Historic Person by the federal government on April 25, 2022, on the advice of the national Historic Sites and Monuments Board.
