= Robert Stewart (Prince Edward Island politician) =

Canadian politician

Speaker of the Legislative Assembly of Prince Edward Island
- In office 1773–1779
- Succeeded by: David Higgins

Personal details
- Born: 1731
- Died: 1787 (aged 55–56)
- Citizenship: British
- Profession: Merchant

Robert Stewart (1731-1787) was a Canadian of Scottish origin who became first Speaker of the Legislative Assembly of Prince Edward Island, serving in this position from 1773 until 1779.

== Early years ==
Robert Stewart was born in 1731. His grandfather was the Reverend Dugald Stewart of Rothesay. One of his cousins was Dugald Stewart, the Mathematician and Philosopher, a Professor at the University of Edinburgh. He married Annabella, daughter of the Reverend Charles Stewart. They had eight children. Annabella was sister of Lieutenant Colonel Robert Stewart and of Peter Stewart, who became first Chief Justice of St. John island, as Prince Edward Island was originally called. For some time Stewart was a fish merchant in Campbeltown, Argyll, but was not successful.

== Prince Edward Island ==
In 1770 Robert and Annabella Stewart emigrated to Prince Edward Island. They sailed from Campbeltown on the brigantine Annabella, captained by Dugald Stewart and carrying one hundred passengers from Argyll. Dugald Stewart was Annabella's brother. Robert Stewart organized the first settlement in Malpeque Bay, on the north shore of the center of the island. Later his brother-in-law Lieutenant Colonel Robert Stewart took over the leadership of the settlement. Robert Stewart of Cambelford was recognized as a leader of the island's community, and became the first speaker of the province's parliament when it was founded in 1773. The first House of Assembly held only one session.
