= 32nd Light Dragoons =

British cavalry regiment (1794–1796)

The 32nd Light Dragoons was a cavalry regiment of the British Army. It was raised in October 1794, by Lieutenant-Colonel Henry Joseph Blake. It was disbanded shortly afterwards on 26 February 1796.
