= 1897 Prince Edward Island general election =

Canadian provincial election

- July 28, 1897

All 30 seats in the Legislative Assembly of Prince Edward Island 16 seats needed for a majority
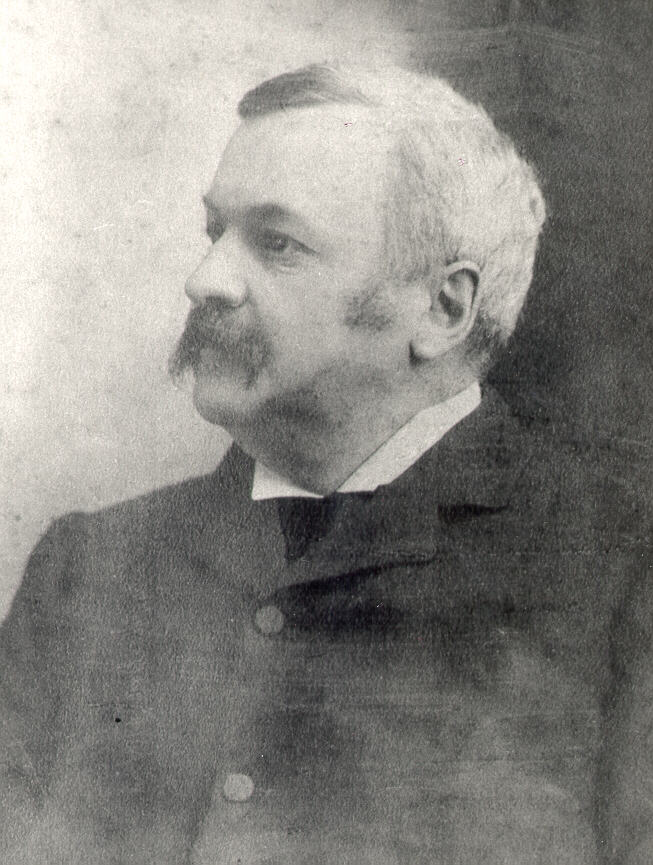
	First party	Second party
		CON
Leader	Frederick Peters	Daniel Gordon
Party	Liberal	Conservative
Leader since	1891	1894
Leader's seat	3rd Queens	5th Kings
Last election	23 seats	7 seats
Seats won	19	11
Seat change	▼4	▲4
Premier before election
Frederick Peters
Liberal
Premier after election
Alexander B. Warburton
Liberal

The 1897 Prince Edward Island general election was held in the Canadian Province of Prince Edward Island on 28 July 1897.

== Party standings ==
Party	Party Leader	Seats	
Party	Party Leader	1893	Elected
Liberal	Frederick Peters	23	19
Conservative	Daniel Gordon	7	11
