= James Curtis (politician) =

Canadian politician

James Curtis (died November 19, 1819) was a merchant, judge, land agent and political figure on Prince Edward Island. He represented Kings County in the Legislative Assembly of Prince Edward Island from 1779 to 1790, from 1797 to 1806 and from 1812 to 1818.

He arrived on St. John's Island (later Prince Edward Island) as the footman of Phillips Callbeck around 1770, later serving as clerk to Callbeck and then David Higgins. He then became a store owner and trader at Covehead in Lot 34. Curtis was first elected to the legislative assembly in 1779. He handled a series of property sales ordered by the island's Council in 1781. Curtis married Elizabeth, the daughter of David Lawson. In 1800, he was named assistant judge of the Supreme Court although he had no legal training. Curtis served as speaker for the legislative assembly from 1801 to 1805 and from 1813 to 1817. Curtis became the land agent for Ann Callbeck, the widow of Phillips Callbeck, and Sir James Montgomery.
