= Sir Donald Campbell, 1st Baronet, of Dunstaffnage =

Lieutenant Governor of Prince Edward Island

Sir Donald Campbell (August 3, 1800 – October 10, 1850) was a colonial administrator, the tenth Governor of Prince Edward Island, serving from December 9, 1847 to October 10, 1850.

He was born in Dunstaffnage, Scotland, the son of Angus Campbell and Lillias Buchanan. Campbell served in the cavalry for a short time while a young man. In 1825, he married Caroline Eliza Plomer. Campbell was named the 1st Baronet of Dunstaffnage in 1836. He became lieutenant governor for Prince Edward Island in 1847 following the dismissal of Sir Henry Vere Huntley. After his arrival, Campbell was closely associated with the more conservative faction on the island, taking Thomas Heath Haviland as his adviser. Campbell quickly came into conflict with the forces calling for responsible government for Prince Edward Island. He dissolved the assembly in 1850, hoping that more cooperative members would be returned, but the majority of those elected were reformers. He died in office in Charlottetown at the age of 50.

Baronetage of the United Kingdom
New creation	Baronet (of Dunstaffnage); 1836–1850	Succeeded by Angus Campbell
