= Benjamin Chappell =

Benjamin Chappell (March 5, 1740 – January 6, 1825) was a machinist and political figure in Prince Edward Island. He was a member of the Legislative Assembly of Prince Edward Island from 1774 to 1784.

He was born in London, the son of Richard Chappell, and trained as a wheelwright and machinist. Raised as an Anglican, he was converted to Methodism by John Wesley, becoming a lay preacher. In 1774, he married Elizabeth Patterson and, later that year, they left with a group of settlers for New London on St. John's Island (later Prince Edward Island). In 1778, he moved to Charlottetown. Chappell was involved in various construction projects, also making spinning wheels, coaches and sleighs. In 1802, he was named deputy postmaster, serving until 1807 and again from 1812 until his death in Charlottetown in 1825.

His daybooks (or diaries) covering the period from 1775 to 1788 and from 1797 to 1818 are an important source of information about life on the island during this period.
