= George R. Dalrymple =

Canadian politician

George R. Dalrymple (ca. 1790 – February 6, 1851) was a Scottish-born businessman and political figure on Prince Edward Island. He represented Kings County from 1828 to 1830 and Queens County from 1831 to 1838 in the Legislative Assembly of Prince Edward Island.

He came to Prince Edward Island in 1821 as a trained apothecary, opening a store in Charlottetown. In 1835, he married Eliza Webster. In 1828, he opened a carding mill in Charlottetown Royalty, later building a flour mill and kiln. He served as speaker for the Prince Edward Island assembly from 1835 to 1839. He was defeated when he ran for reelection in 1838, after opposing the withholding of rent to protest the lack of action on land reform on the island. In 1839, he was named to the Legislative Council of Prince Edward Island, serving until his death in Charlottetown in 1851.
