= Charles Binns =

Canadian politician

Member of the Legislative Assembly of Prince Edward Island
- In office 1818–1820

Personal details
- Born: c. 1786
- Died: April 28, 1847
- Occupation: lawyer, businessman and political figure

Charles Binns (c. 1786 – April 28, 1847) was a lawyer, businessman and political figure in Prince Edward Island. He represented Prince County from 1818 to 1820 and Charlottetown from 1831 to 1838 in the Legislative Assembly of Prince Edward Island.

Binns, thought to have been born in Yorkshire, was trained as a lawyer in England. In 1809, he set up an agency at Charlottetown with James Bardin Palmer intended to supply a partner in England with products exported from the island. In the same year, he married Elizabeth Clarke. After his business venture failed, Binns became a barrister on the island, acquired land there and also became a land agent for other land owners. He served as deputy colonial secretary, solicitor general from 1818 to 1820 and acting attorney general from 1819 to 1820. He also was a captain in the island's militia. Binns was opposed to changes to the land ownership system on the island. After becoming ill, he did not run for reelection in 1839. Binns died in Charlottetown in 1847.
