= Paul Mabey =

Canadian politician

- Born: 1786; Bedeque, Prince Edward Island
- Died: March 21, 1863 (aged 76–77)
- Occupation: politician

Paul Mabey (c. 1786 – March 21, 1863) was a merchant and political figure in Prince Edward Island. He represented Charlottetown in the Legislative Assembly of Prince Edward Island from 1817 to 1830.

Mabey was born at Bedeque, Prince Edward Island, the son of George Mabey, who had moved there from Nova Scotia. He became a clerk for a Charlottetown merchant, later becoming a partner and then opening his own business. He was part of a group that lobbied for the dismissal of Governor Charles Douglass Smith over the issue of quitrents. In 1823, he was charged with others with contempt of the Court of Chancery after a public meeting critical of Smith but these charges were later dropped. Mabey was defeated in a bid for reelection in 1830 and subsequently retired from politics. He also served as a captain in the local militia. In 1861, he was judged to be of unsound mind following a deterioration of his mental condition later in life and he died two years later at Pownal Point on the island.
