= William Henry Pope (Canadian politician) =

Canadian jurist and Father of Confederation (1825–1879)

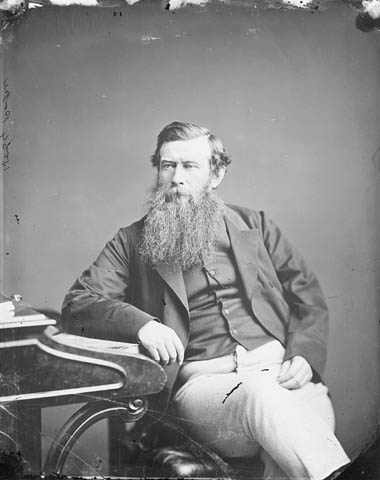

Delegate to the Charlottetown Conference from Prince Edward Island
- In office September 1, 1864 – September 9, 1864

Personal details
- Born: May 29, 1825
- Died: October 7, 1879 (aged 54)
- Party: Independent

William Henry Pope (May 29, 1825 – October 7, 1879) was a Canadian lawyer, politician, journalist, judge and one of the Fathers of Confederation.

He was born in Bedeque, P.E.I. (Prince Edward Island), the son of Joseph Pope and Lucy Colledge. He was educated in England, but returned to Charlottetown where he studied law at the office of Edward Palmer. He became a lawyer in 1847. The editor of Prince Edward Island's main Tory newspaper, The Islander, from 1859 to 1872, he entered politics in 1863.

He was named Colonial Secretary in 1859 even though he was not a part of the legislature because of a government experiment of having civil servants head the government departments. When he became a representative for the constituency of Belfast in 1863, he continued to hold that position. He was one of the hosts of the Charlottetown Conference in 1864.

An enthusiastic supporter of Canadian Confederation, he left the PEI cabinet in 1864 when the government rejected Confederation outright, but continued to press for union. The allocation of land was a key issue for Islanders in the 1860s; Pope opposed the idea of escheat, a common idea at the time. After this was accomplished in 1873 under the leadership of his brother, PEI Premier James Colledge Pope, he was appointed a county court judge. His son, Joseph Pope, became the private secretary to Canada's first Prime Minister Sir John A. Macdonald and later wrote his biography The Day of Sir John Macdonald

Ardgowan, Pope's residence, was designated a National Historic Site of Canada in 1966. During the Charlottetown Conference, the Popes billetted George Brown and hosted a luncheon for delegates at Ardgowan.

Pope was a Freemason of Victoria Lodge in Charlottetown, at the time No. 383 under the Grand Lodge of Scotland, but today No. 2 under the Grand Lodge of Prince Edward Island.

== Bibliography ==
- Robertson, Ian Ross (1972). "Pope, William Henry". In Hayne, David (ed.). Dictionary of Canadian Biography. Vol. X (1871–1880) (online ed.). University of Toronto Press.
