= James Bardin Palmer =

Canadian politician (c. 1771–1833)

James Bardin Palmer (ca 1771 – March 3, 1833) was an Irish-born land agent, lawyer and politician in Prince Edward Island. He represented Charlottetown in the Legislative Assembly of Prince Edward Island from 1806 to 1818.

He was born in Dublin, the son of Joseph Palmer. Palmer was admitted to practice as a solicitor in Ireland in 1791. He left for London sometime before 1800. Unsuccessful there, he arrived on Prince Edward Island in August 1802 as a land agent for the Reverend Raphael Walsh of Dublin, who owned Lot 11. Palmer was admitted to the Prince Edward Island bar in November 1802. In 1803, he married Millicent Jones.

Palmer was named to the Legislative Council in June 1806. He resigned from the council in October that year and ran successfully for a seat in the legislative assembly. Palmer was associated with a group known as the Loyal Electors, a group critical of the island's ruling elite. He resigned from his seat in 1809, and in October of that year, was again named to the legislative council. He served as adjutant general for the militia, inspector of public accounts, master and registrar in Chancery and inspector of roads for the colony. After the death of Peter Magowan, the attorney general, in 1810, Palmer was considered as a possible successor but Charles Stewart was chosen instead. In 1812, Palmer resigned from his seat on the council and again ran successfully for a seat in the legislative assembly. Palmer was removed as a barrister in November 1816 after charges of professional misconduct were brought against him by John Hill; Palmer had been bringing forward charges of concealment of assets against Hill, who had declared bankruptcy in 1807. Palmer was reinstated as a barrister in 1819. He served as acting attorney general in 1824 while William Johnston was temporarily removed from that post. He was elected to the assembly again in an 1827 by-election but his election was overturned by the assembly. He ran again unsuccessfully in 1829 and 1830.

With others, he helped establish a newspaper, The Phenix, which pressed for reforms in the administration of the colony. He died in Charlottetown following a stroke in 1833.

His son Edward Palmer served in the province's assembly and, although opposed to Confederation, is considered one of the Fathers of Confederation.
