= Thomas Heath Haviland Sr. =

Canadian politician (1795/1796–1867)

Thomas Heath Haviland (April 30, 1795 (or 1796)–June 18, 1867) was an English-born land owner, banker and political figure in Prince Edward Island, Canada.

He was born in Cirencester, Gloucestershire, England and came to Prince Edward Island in 1816. He served as provost marshal and naval officer. He married Jane Rebecca Brecken in 1822. In 1823, he was named to the Council for the province, in 1824, he became assistant judge in the Supreme Court and, in 1830, colonial treasurer. Haviland became colonial secretary, registrar and clerk for the Executive and Legislative councils in 1839. He accumulated a large amount of real estate in the province. In 1848, he married Amelia Janetta Emslie after the death of his first wife in 1839.

He was elected to the Legislative Assembly of Prince Edward Island for Princetown in an 1854 by-election and named to the Executive Council. Haviland served as the second mayor of Charlottetown from 1857 until his death. He was also president of the Bank of Prince Edward Island. He died of kidney disease in 1867.

Haviland's villa house in Charlottetown, Fairholm, was designated a National Historic Site of Canada in 1992.

His son, also named Thomas Heath Haviland, served in the provincial assembly, the Canadian senate and as Lieutenant Governor for the province. His daughter Sarah Frances married George Wastie Deblois.

== Bibliography ==
- Biography at the Dictionary of Canadian Biography Online
