= Alexander Laird =

Canadian politician

Alexander Laird (1797 – April 15, 1873) was a Scottish-born farmer and political figure in Prince Edward Island. He represented 1st Queens from 1850 to 1853 and from 1854 to 1859 as a Conservative and 2nd Queens from 1859 to 1866 as a Liberal in the Legislative Assembly of Prince Edward Island.

A native of Kilmacolm, he came to Prince Edward Island in 1819 and married Janet Orr in the same year. They settled at New Glasgow. He was elected in 1850 but defeated when he ran for reelection in 1853; Laird was elected again in 1854. He was originally a supporter of the Liberals, but later ran as a Tory in 1859 after he split from his former party over the issue of the place of the Bible in schools. Laird served in the provincial Executive Council in the government of Edward Palmer from 1859 to 1863. He retired from politics in 1866. Laird died on his farm in New Glasgow in 1873.

His sons Alexander and William served in the province's legislative assembly, Alexander also serving in the legislative council, and his son David was a member of the House of Commons and Lieutenant-Governor for the Northwest Territories.
