= Peter Magowan (lawyer) =

Canadian politician

Member of the Legislative Assembly of Prince Edward Island for Kings County
- In office 1790–1810

Personal details
- Born: March 22, 1762 Bridgnorth, Shropshire, UK
- Died: June 19, 1810 (aged 48) Charlottetown, Prince Edward Island
- Occupation: Lawyer

Peter Magowan (March 22, 1762 – June 19, 1810) was a Canadian lawyer and political figure in Prince Edward Island. He represented Kings County in the Legislative Assembly of Prince Edward Island from 1790 to 1810. His surname also appears as McGowan or Macgowan.

Born in Bridgnorth, Shropshire, (the Dictionary of Canadian Biography Online states that he may have been a native of Ireland) Magowan was educated in England and was admitted to practice as an attorney of the King's Bench in 1782. In 1788, he married Ann Stainforth. He immigrated to St. John's Island (later Prince Edward Island) in 1789 from London. He was first elected to the colony's assembly in 1790. For some time, he and Attorney General Joseph Aplin were the only practicing lawyers on the island. Magowan was deputy to Thomas Desbrisay, secretary and registrar, from 1795 to 1800. He was named acting attorney general in 1798 when Aplin was relieved of his duties and became attorney general in 1800, serving in that post until his death in Charlottetown in 1810. Magowan was reelected to the assembly in 1803 and 1806.

His grandson Alexander Henry Boswall MacGowan later served in the British Columbia assembly.
