= Land agent =

Occupational term with several meanings

Land agent may be used in at least three different contexts. Traditionally, a land agent was a managerial employee who conducted the business affairs of a large landed estate for a member of the nobility or landed gentry, supervising the farming of the property by farm labourers and/or tenants and collecting rents or other payments. In this context a land agent was a relatively privileged position and was a senior member of the estate's staff. The older term, which continued to be used on some estates, was steward, and in Scotland a land agent was usually referred to as a factor. Today the term estate manager or similar is more common.

== Other uses ==
A land agent, also called a warrant agent, may also be a real estate agent or broker who specialises in land and farm sales. Land and farm sales differ drastically from sales of houses, therefore there is the need for specialisation. This usage is found in the United Kingdom, Australia, and the United States. In the UK a land agent may also advise on related law, tax and planning matters.

The land agent can also be an agent of the oil and mining industry who negotiates with landowners for mineral and surface rights for the potential extraction of those minerals. This usage is primarily found in the United States and in Canada.

In the Canadian jurisdiction of the Northwest Territories, a land agent is an employee of the federal department of Indigenous and Northern Affairs tasked with guiding individuals wishing to purchase or lease crown land through the application process.
