= Henry Vere Huntley =

Canadian politician

Sir Henry Vere Huntley
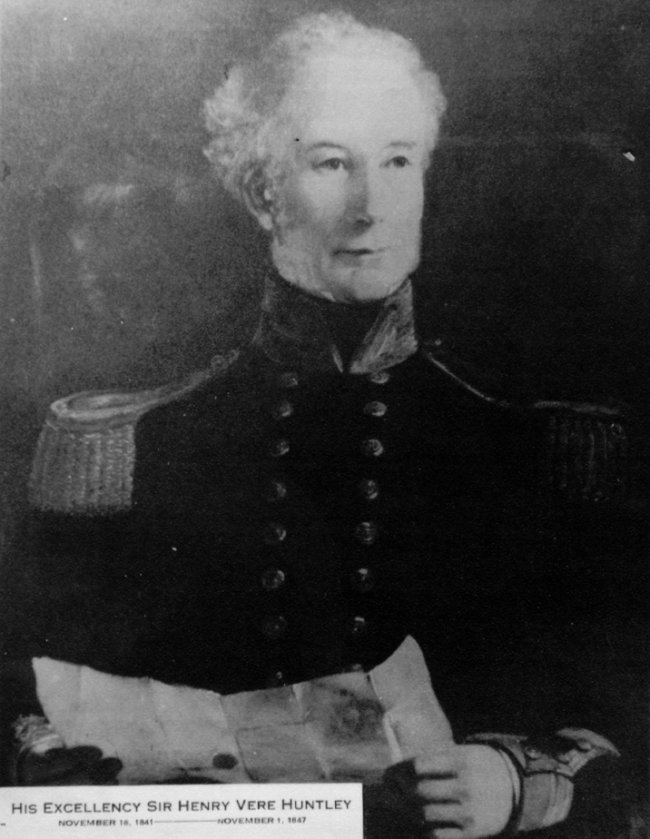

Lieutenant Governor of The Gambia
- In office 1840–1841
- Preceded by: Thomas Lewis Ingram
- Succeeded by: Thomas Lewis Ingram

Governor of Prince Edward Island
- In office 1841–1847
- Preceded by: Charles Augustus FitzRoy
- Succeeded by: Sir Donald Campbell, 1st Baronet

Personal details
- Born: 1795
- Died: 7 May 1864 (aged 68–69) Santos, Brazil

Sir Henry Vere Huntley (1795 – 7 May 1864) was an English naval officer and colonial administrator. He was the eleventh Governor of Prince Edward Island.

From 1840 to 1841, he was the Lieutenant Governor of The Gambia. From 1841 to 1847, he was governor of Prince Edward Island.
