= John Hamilton Gray (Prince Edward Island politician) =

Canadian Father of Confederation (1811–1887)

The Honourable John Hamilton Gray
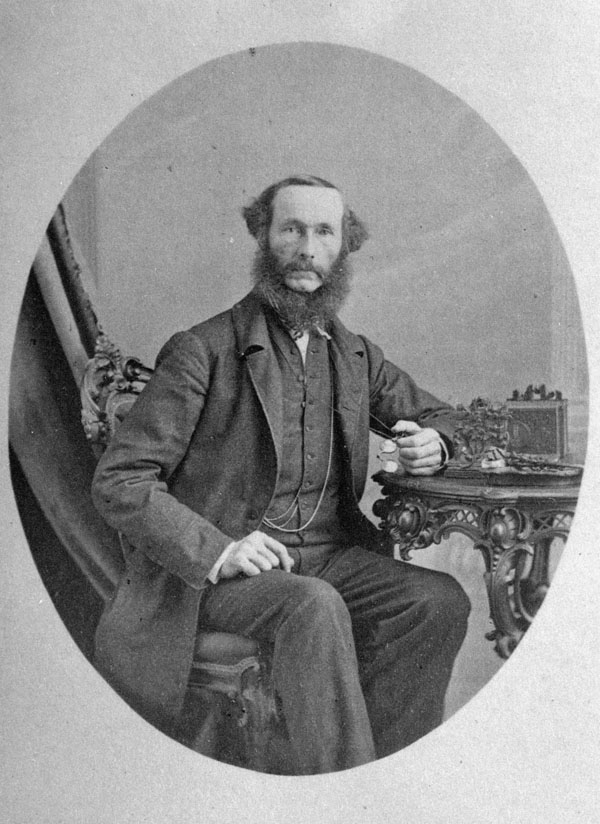

Premier of Prince Edward Island
- In office March 2, 1863 – January 7, 1865
- Preceded by: Edward Palmer
- Succeeded by: James Colledge Pope

Personal details
- Born: June 14, 1811 Charlottetown, Prince Edward Island, Canada
- Died: July 13, 1887 (aged 76) Charlottetown, Prince Edward Island, Canada
- Party: Conservative

John Hamilton Gray (June 14, 1811 – August 13, 1887) was Premier of Prince Edward Island from 1863 to 1865 and one of the Fathers of Confederation.

Gray began his political career in 1862 when he was elected to the provincial assembly as a reformer, despite his conservative roots. He became a leading member of the opposition, with a reputation even among his opponents as a great orator. He impressed the governor so much that he was invited to become a member of the Executive Council. However, his acceptance of the position drew criticism from his reform colleagues, and gained him a reputation for vacillation that followed him for the rest of his career. Gray became the Tory leader in the assembly, but when the Liberals won a majority in 1854, he was once again relegated to the opposition. Two years later, in 1856, the provincial governor dismissed the Liberal Executive Council and replaced them with a government led by Gray.

== Early life ==
Gray was born in Charlottetown, Prince Edward Island on June 14, 1811. His father, Robert Gray, was originally from Glasgow who emigrated to Virginia as a loyalist, then later moved to Shelburne, Nova Scotia, who moved to the island in 1787 under the invitation of Edmund Fanning. His mother's name was Mary Burns. Gray showed an early "desire for military life" as a child, and completed his education in England.

== Career ==
Gray was educated in Charlottetown. He chose a military career, trained in England and was commissioned into the 15th Foot in 1831. He transferred to the 13th Light Dragoons later the same year, the 15th Light Dragoons in 1839, the 1st Dragoon Guards in 1840, the 14th Light Dragoons in 1841, and the 7th Dragoon Guards in 1844.

It was not long before he was asked to participate in the political life of the colony. In 1858 he was elected to represent the district of 4th Queens in the Legislative Assembly of Prince Edward Island as a Conservative. He was re-elected in 1863.

Gray was Premier of Prince Edward Island from 1863 to 1865 and during that time he attempted to alleviate the problems of the tenants by passing the fifteen-year purchase act, but the final solution of this question had to await Confederation. Gray was chairman of the 1864 Charlottetown Conference, which laid the groundwork for the British North America Act 1867. He supported the entry of the Island into Confederation but when the Island rejected the scheme he left politics, turning the government over to James Colledge Pope.

He then returned to his first interest, the military. He was appointed adjutant-general of the PEI military in 1867 with the rank of colonel. He continued to be an administrator of military affairs until after the eventual Confederation of Prince Edward Island with Canada in 1873.

In 1887 John Hamilton Gray died at Inkerman House in Charlottetown. The name of the estate is in reference to the Battle of Inkerman where his father-in-law Sir John Pennyfeather, had lost honours to an older man. Inkerman Drive which once led to the house, is lined with trees planted by Gray and replacements of the same species, to represent the sides in the Battle. Linden on one side (Russian) and a mixture of white birch, beech, mountain ash and poplar on the other (French and English).

== Recognition and legacy ==
- Colonel Gray Sr. High School, a public secondary school in Charlottetown, Prince Edward Island that opened in 1966 is named in his honour.
- In 1968, a CN automobile/passenger/railcar ferry entered service carrying the name MV John Hamilton Gray, honouring both Fathers of Confederation.
