= William Cooper (Prince Edward Island politician) =

Canadian politician

Speaker of the Legislative Assembly of Prince Edward Island
- In office 1839–1842
- Preceded by: George R. Dalrymple
- Succeeded by: Joseph Pope

Personal details
- Citizenship: Canadian
- Profession: Politician

William Cooper was the speaker of 15th Legislative Assembly of Prince Edward Island from 1839 to 1842. He was the speaker during all the five sessions of the assembly.
