= John Small MacDonald =

Canadian politician

John Small MacDonald (ca. 1791 – January 20, 1849) was a businessman and politician on Prince Edward Island.

He was born in West River, Saint John's Island (later Prince Edward Island), the son of John Macdonald and Margaret (Peggy) Macdonald, the sister of Captain John MacDonald of Glenaladale. Macdonald married Isabella McDonald. In 1830, he was elected to represent Queens County in the Legislative Assembly. As a landowner, he opposed giving ownership of the land to the tenant farmers; however, he supported moderate reforms. Macdonald was re-elected to the assembly until he retired from politics in 1846. He also served as a captain in the militia and a justice of the peace. In 1839, he was named to the Executive Council, and served in that function until his death in Charlottetown at the age of 58. Madonald was also named high sheriff for Queens County that year. Later in life he became a shipbuilder, but his ships were not considered well-built and the business lost money.
