= John MacKintosh =

Canadian politician

John MacKintosh (December 1790 – December 14, 1881) was a farmer and politician in Prince Edward Island. His surname also appears as Macintosh.

He was born in Naufrage, Prince Edward Island, descended from Scottish immigrants. In 1808, he married Margaret MacDonald. He was first elected to the Legislative Assembly of Prince Edward Island in a by-election held in October 1835. MacKintosh supported an end to the existing land ownership system on the island and the redistribution of land to tenant farmers. Because he spoke Scottish Gaelic, he was able to help advise the uneducated tenant farmers. He was accused of disloyalty when he helped prepare a petition to King William IV proposing reform of land ownership on the island. MacKintosh served in the assembly until he was defeated in 1850. He supported responsible government for Prince Edward Island during his time in the assembly. MacKintosh was reelected in 1854 and finally retired from politics in 1858. He died at Naufrage at the age of 90.
