= John Ready =

British general and colonial administrator (d. 1845)

Major General The Honourable John Ready

6th Lieutenant Governor of the Isle of Man
- In office 1832–1845
- Monarchs: William IV; Victoria
- Preceded by: Cornelius Smelt
- Succeeded by: Charles Hope

Personal details
- Born: John Ready c. 1777
- Died: 10 July 1845 (aged 67–68)
- Spouse(s): Susanna Bromley; Sarah Tobin

Military service
- Allegiance: United Kingdom
- Branch/service: British Army
- Years of service: 1796–1845
- Rank: Major-General

John Ready (c. 1777 – 10 July 1845) was a British Army officer, who served as Lieutenant Governor of Prince Edward Island from 1824 to 1831 and also as Lieutenant Governor of the Isle of Man from 1832 to 1845.

== Career ==
Ready joined the British Army as an ensign in 1796. He was appointed Secretary to the Lord Lieutenant of Ireland in 1815 and military secretary and then civil secretary to the Governor General of British North America in 1818. In 1824 he was appointed lieutenant governor of Prince Edward Island: there he imported livestock at his own expense, promoted the building of roads and ensured there was a school in every town. He became Lieutenant Governor of the Isle of Man in 1832 but died in office at Castletown on the Isle of Man in 1845 and was buried on the island with full military honours.

== Family ==
In 1804 he married Susanna Bromley; they had two sons and two daughters; following the death of his first wife he married Sarah Tobin in 1836. His son John Tobin Ready joined the 66th Foot as an officer in 1854. As a veteran of the 2nd Afghan War (Maiwand/Kandahar) Colonel John T. Ready retired in 1887. One of his daughters married Dr. Charles Milner.

Government offices
Preceded by Cornelius Smelt	Lieutenant Governor of the Isle of Man; 1832–1845	Succeeded by Charles Hope
