= Robert Hodgson (judge) =

Canadian politician

The Honourable Sir Robert Hodgson

2nd Lieutenant Governor of Prince Edward Island
- In office July 14, 1874 – July 14, 1879
- Monarch: Victoria
- Governors General: The Earl of Dufferin; Marquess of Lorne
- Premier: Lemuel Owen; Louis Henry Davies; William Wilfred Sullivan
- Preceded by: William Cleaver Francis Robinson
- Succeeded by: Thomas Heath Haviland

Personal details
- Born: September 13, 1798 Charlottetown, Saint John’s Island Colony
- Died: September 15, 1880 (aged 82) Charlottetown, Prince Edward Island, Dominion of Canada
- Spouse: Fanny Macdonald (m. 1827)
- Children: Two sons and one daughter
- Education: University of King's College
- Occupation: Lawyer, land agent, judge
- Profession: Politician

Sir Robert Hodgson (1798 – 15 September 1880) was a Canadian lawyer, politician, judge, and the second Lieutenant Governor of Prince Edward Island.

== Early life and education ==
Hodgson was born in Charlottetown, Prince Edward Island, in 1798, to Robert Hodgson Sr. and Rebecca Robinson, the former being a member of the General Assembly of Prince Edward Island and public speaker who died while Hodgson Jr. was a child. His family was Anglican and Hodgson was the oldest of a total of 5 children, 3 sons and a daughter.

Hodgson moved to Windsor, Nova Scotia to complete his education, going to the University of King's College. He then traveled to Halifax, Nova Scotia, where Simon Bradstreet Robie and James William Johnston helped him study law. He later returned to Charlottetown and became a politician and lawyer. In Charlottetown, Hodgson had a wife, Fanny McDonell, whom he married in 1827. After having 3 children, two daughters and a son, McDonell died 5 years after their marriage, on 2 May 1832; Hodgson did not marry again after her death.

== Career ==
In 1819, Hodgson became a part of the Bar of Nova Scotia, as well as the Bar of Prince Edward Island. In 1824, Hodgson successfully contested an assembly seat in Charlottetown, Prince Edward Island. He became the land owner of several businesses, often working with John Lawson. Hodgson became the temporary attorney general of Prince Edward Island in May 1828, after the death of William Johnston, the previous attorney of the colony; this was switched to a permanent appointment in 1829. Hodgson also became the advocate general, surrogate, and judge of probate of the island in 1828.

Hodgson became the president of the Legislative Council of Prince Edward Island in 1840, after serving in that council, as well as the Executive Council, since 1829. He became a temporary chief justice of the island in 1841. In 1850, reformers of Prince Edward Island asked if Hodgson would join them, stating that they would allow him to keep both of his positions in office. However, he refused, and in 1851, the reformers ended up taking power of the island. At this point, Hodgson resigned from his attorney general position and his Executive Council seat, but kept his position as president of the Legislative Council for the next year.

After agreeing to not accept any office of payment controlled by the island's government, Hodgson received a grant of £200 a year, for his work as attorney general. On 26 May 1852, he was appointed chief justice of Prince Edward Island by the executive council; the governor, Alexander Bannerman, believed that Hodgson had "a thorough knowledge of Colonial & Constitutional law." Throughout his time as chief justice, he performed as an administrator of the island several times during Dundas's absences from governor. He was selected to be the judge of the Court of Vice-Admiralty in 1853.

His first period serving as an administrator was in 1865, from July – December, during which time disputes over land were occurring. The members of the Tenant League, a populist league which wanted to demolish the proprietary land system, would not pay landlords their rent. This issue became so severe that soldiers were sent to restore order by Hodgson. This proved to be successful, and the action was praised by the press of the island and London.

Hodgson was knighted in 1869, along with William Young. Also in 1869, Hodgson requested to be the lieutenant governor of the island, but was unsuccessful, with William C. F. Robinson becoming the lieutenant governor instead. However, Hodgson did become the lieutenant governor in 1874; the previous year, Robinson had resigned his position and left the island. Hodgson served as lieutenant governor until 1879, when he retired. He died on 15—16 September 1880, a year after his retirement, when he was 82 years old.
