= Joseph Wightman (Canadian politician) =

Canadian farmer, merchant and political figure on Prince Edward Island

Joseph Wightman (1806 – February 6, 1887) was a Scottish-born farmer, merchant and political figure on Prince Edward Island. He served in the Legislative Assembly of Prince Edward Island from 1838 to 1839 and from 1843 to 1862 and from 1867 to 1874 and in the Legislative Council of Prince Edward Island from 1874 to 1882 as a Liberal.

He was born in Dumfriesshire, the son of John Wightman and Margaret Ray Armstrong, and was educated in Scotland, attending Lockerby Academy. He came to Prince Edward Island with his family in 1823. The property on which they settled was originally leased from Sir James Montgomery but the family purchased the land in 1857. Besides farming and raising livestock, Wightman was also involved in fishing and shipbuilding. His goods were exported to England and he also traded with American fisherman. Wightman married Margaret McDonald in 1838. He was a justice of the peace and served in the militia, reaching the rank of lieutenant-colonel. Wightman also served as high sheriff for Kings County. He was speaker for the assembly from 1867 to 1870 and in 1872. He also served as president for the legislative council in 1876 and 1877. Wightman was a minister without portfolio in the province's Executive Council from 1854 to 1859 and from 1879 to 1882. Wightman retired from politics in 1882 due to health problems. He died in Lower Montague in 1887.

His daughter Mary Armstrong married James R. McLean.
