= Francis Longworth =

Canadian politician

Francis Longworth (October 3, 1807 – June 12, 1883) was a merchant, ship builder and political figure in Prince Edward Island. He represented Charlottetown and Royalty in the Legislative Assembly of Prince Edward Island from 1838 to 1859 as a Conservative member.

He was born in Charlottetown, the son of Francis Longworth, an Irish immigrant. In 1835, he married Sarah Parker Watts. In 1834, he became a partner of his brother Robert, who owned a store in Charlottetown. In 1842, he opened another store with a partner. He also built and owned ships. He was also a director for several companies, including the Charlottetown Gas Light Company and the Steam Navigation Company.

In 1838, Longworth and Edward Palmer were chosen by the elite of the town, members of the so-called "family compact", to represent Charlottetown and Royalty in the provincial assembly. He was elected nine times, often running unopposed. Longworth also was a justice of the peace. His business interests often kept him away from the business of the assembly. He served in the Executive Council as colonial secretary in 1854. Longworth retired from politics in 1859 and was named controller of customs and navigation laws and customs controller for Charlottetown. He served as appraiser of customs for Charlottetown from 1873 to 1880. Longworth was also high sheriff for Queens County, Prince Edward Island three times. He died in Charlottetown in 1883.

His brother John, a more moderate conservative, also served as a member of the provincial assembly.
