= George Coles (politician) =

Canadian Father of Confederation (1810–1875)

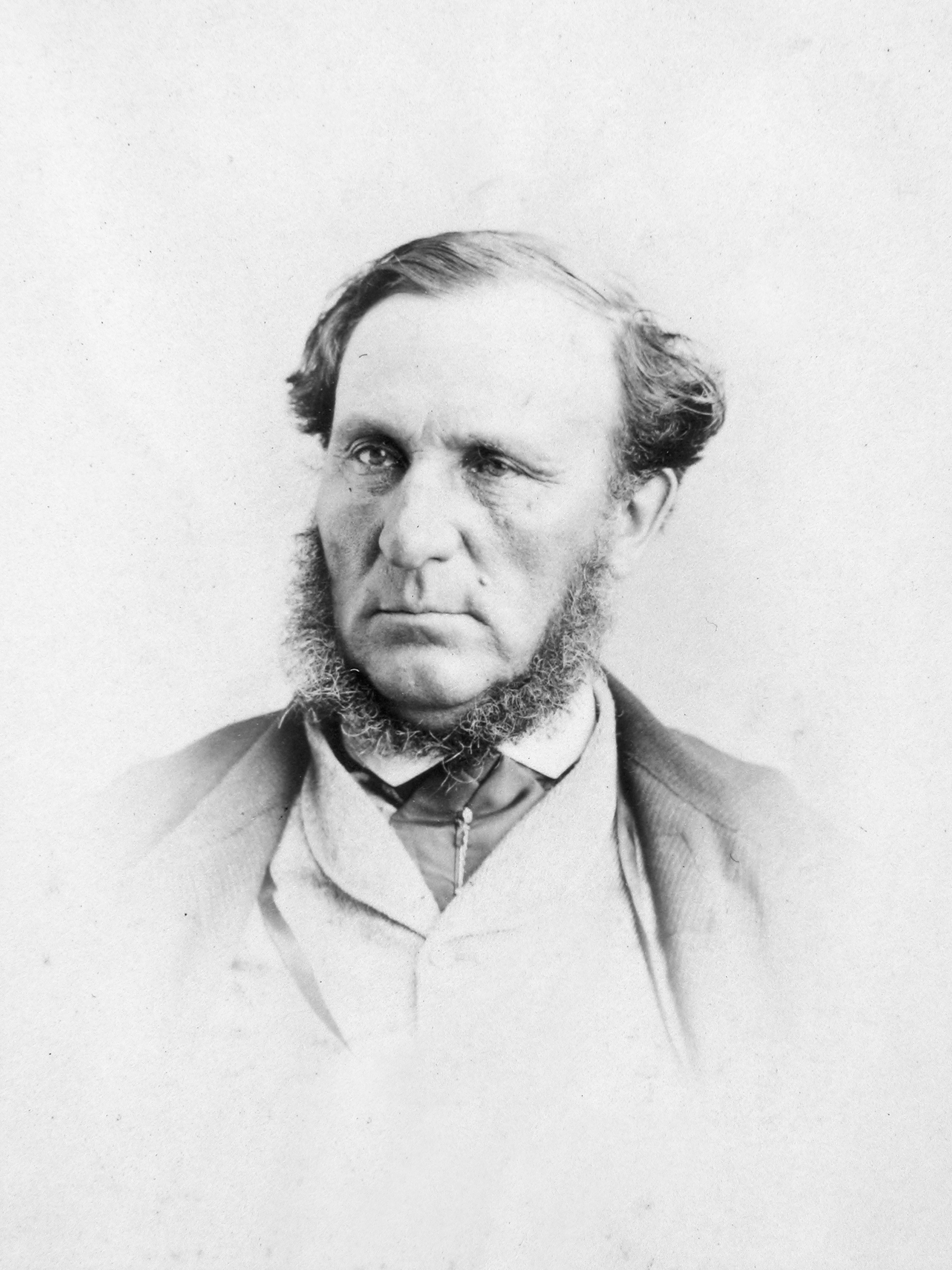
- Coles in 1865

Premier of Prince Edward Island
- In office 1851–1854
- Monarch: Victoria.
- Lieutenant Governor: Sir Alexander Bannerman
- Preceded by: None
- Succeeded by: John Holl
- In office 1855–1859
- Monarch: Victoria
- Lieutenant Governor: Sir Dominick Daly
- Preceded by: John Holl
- Succeeded by: Edward Palmer
- In office 1867–1869
- Monarch: Victoria
- Lieutenant Governor: George Dundas; Sir Robert Hodgson
- Preceded by: James Colledge Pope
- Succeeded by: Joseph Hensley

Personal details
- Born: September 20, 1810 Queens Royalty, Prince Edward Island Colony
- Died: August 21, 1875 (aged 64) Charlottetown Royalty, Prince Edward Island, Canada
- Party: Liberal
- Spouse(s): Mercy Haine from East Pennard, Somerset, England

George Coles (September 20, 1810 – August 21, 1875) was a Canadian politician, being the first premier of Prince Edward Island, and a Father of Canadian Confederation.

Coles was born in Queens Royalty, Prince Edward Island, the son of James Coles, a farmer, and Sarah Tally. Although he had little formal education he became a farmer and a businessman at an early age. He travelled to England at age 19. There he learned about the brewing industry. While in England he married Mercy Haine on August 14, 1833, and they returned to Prince Edward Island before the end of that year. He soon became a prosperous brewer and merchant.

He first entered politics in 1841 representing the New London-DeSable district in the Assembly. Coles was always a colourful political figure. He is said to have duelled with Edward Palmer and to have challenged James C. Pope to a duel as well. As a member of the provincial government in 1846, he spent 31 days in the custody of the sergeant-at-arms for refusing to retract a statement made in the assembly. He was convicted of assault in the 1850s.

His administration embarked on a number of significant reforms the most important being the Free Education Act and the Land Purchase Act. The former provided better educational opportunities than in any of the other colonies and the latter was a positive step toward a solution to the land ownership question. He and Edward Whelan had laid the foundations of the Liberal party and in doing so created the political balances which dominated Prince Edward Island politics during the middle years of the nineteenth century. Despite being an early supporter of union he turned against Confederation when it became apparent that the project would not solve the land tenure question.

Just before Confederation all his properties burned down. He abandoned his public life and went into seclusion. For a time he was thought to be insane and was placed under care by his family, though modern historians have been divided over whether he actually was insane or was merely suffering from depression. Coles died in 1875 at his home in Charlottetown Royalty.
