= David Lawson (politician) =

Canadian politician

David Lawson (c. 1720 – c. 1803) was a Scottish immigrant who settled on Prince Edward Island. He was, at various times and circumstances, a farmer, a land agent and a politician.

Lawson was born near Muthill, Scotland and became a flax farmer in Perthshire. He was recommended in 1769 to James William Montgomery, Scotland's lord advocate, who was the owner of the township of Lot 34 in the new British colony of St. John's Island (renamed Prince Edward Island in 1799). Lawson recruited about 50 indentured servants in Perthshire and embarked with his family on the Falmouth from Greenock on 8 April 1770. The Falmouth arrived on 8 June 1770 in Stanhope (named after Montgomery's Scottish estate) after a difficult voyage.

As a land agent, Lawson found himself in dispute with James William Montgomery, Scotland's lord advocate, who had funded the settlement group. Lawson's activity in politics included elected membership in the Prince Edward Island House of Assembly between 1773 and 1785. In 1788 he was evicted by Montgomery for refusing to handle his landlord duties and later successfully sued during the 1790s for damages.

Montgomery eventually forgave Lawson's debt and paid him a stipend so that he could continue to live at his home in Covehead. His name disappears from records after 1803.
