= Angus Macaulay =

Canadian politician

Member of the Legislative Assembly of Prince Edward Island
- In office 1806–1827
- Constituency: Queens County

Personal details
- Born: December 10, 1759 Applecross
- Died: December 6, 1827 (aged 67)
- Spouse: Mary Macdonald
- Occupation: Schoolmaster, Physician, Politician

Angus Macaulay (December 10, 1759 – December 6, 1827) was a schoolmaster, physician and political figure in Prince Edward Island.

He represented Queens County in the Legislative Assembly of Prince Edward Island from 1806 to 1827. His surname also appears as McAulay.

He was the son of Æneas Macaulay, born in Applecross. Macaulay studied at King's College in Aberdeen, graduating in 1782. He became qualified as a Presbyterian preacher in 1785 but instead became a school teacher on the Isle of Skye. In 1790, he married Mary Macdonald.

In 1802, Macaulay began recruiting settlers for the Earl of Selkirk for a proposed settlement in Upper Canada near the current site of Sault Ste Marie. Later the following year, the location was changed to Prince Edward Island.

Macaulay was granted a M.D. from the University of Glasgow in 1803 before his departure. On the island, he built a chapel on his property at Point Prim, where he also taught school. He was granted a license to practice law by Governor Joseph Frederick Wallet DesBarres but Peter Magowan, the island's attorney general, protested this on the grounds that Macaulay had no formal legal training and was also a preacher. In 1809, he joined the Loyal Electors, a group critical of the island's ruling elite, particularly Lord Selkirk. Macaulay served as speaker for the legislative assembly from 1818 to 1824.
