= James Yeo (shipbuilder) =

Canadian politician

James Yeo (1789 – August 25, 1868) was a Cornish-born shipbuilder, merchant, farmer and political figure in Prince Edward Island.

He was born in Kilkhampton, Cornwall, England, the son of James Yeo. Yeo married Mary Francis (~1795-1818) in 1812. He married Damaris Sargent (~1797-1868) in 1819 after the death of his first wife. He entered business as a carter and immigrated to Port Hill, Prince County, Prince Edward Island after that business failed. He set himself up as a lumber dealer, store owner and owner of a merchant schooner. Yeo began building ships in 1840 with his sons James, John and William also being involved in the business. He also exported agricultural produce and lumber. His business prospered and he acquired large amounts of land on the island, part of which later became Green Park Provincial Park.

In 1839, he was elected to the Legislative Assembly of Prince Edward Island as a Conservative member for 1st Prince serving until 1846 and again from 1848 to 1863. He was a member of the Legislative Council until 1867. Yeo died at Port Hill in 1868.
