= William Douse =

Canadian politician

William Douse (May 19, 1800 – February 5, 1864) was a land agent, landowner and political figure in Prince Edward Island. He represented Queens County from 1835 to 1839, then 3rd Queens from 1843 to 1847 and from 1850 to 1859 and then 4th Queens from 1859 to 1862 in the Legislative Assembly of Prince Edward Island.

He was born in England and came to the island in the early 1820s. He tried his hand at ship building, farming and dealing in grain and produce. Douse married Esther Young. In 1833, he became land agent for the 6th Earl of Selkirk and he continued in that role until the estate was purchased by the province in 1860. In 1855, he purchased 14,000 acres (57 km^{2}) of the estate. Douse died in Charlottetown in 1864.
