= Speaker of the Legislative Assembly of Prince Edward Island =

Canadian provincial legislative officer

The Speaker of the Legislative Assembly of Prince Edward Island is the presiding officer of the provincial legislature.

The current speaker is Brad Trivers.

Past speakers have included Wilbur MacDonald, Greg Deighan and Nancy Guptill.

== List of speakers ==
=== Speakers of the Colony of the Island of Saint John/Prince Edward Island ===
- Robert Stewart (1773–1779)
- David Higgins (1779–1780)
- Walter Berry (1780–1784)
- Alexander Fletcher (1785–1787)
- Phillips Callbeck (1788–1789)
- Alexander Fletcher (1790) 2nd time
- Joseph Robinson (1790–1794)
- John Stewart (1795–1801)
- James Curtis (1801–1805)
- Robert Hodgson (1806–1812)
- Ralph Brecken (1812–1813)
- James Curtis (1813–1818) 2nd time
- Angus Macaulay (1818–1825)
- John Stewart (1825–1831) 2nd time
- William McNeill (1831–1835)
- George Dalrymple (1835–1839)
- William Cooper (1839–1843)
- Joseph Pope (1843–1850)
- Alexander Rae (1850–1854)
- John Jardine (1854)
- Edward Thornton (1854–1859)
- Donald Montgomery (1859–1863)
- Thomas Heath Haviland (1863–1867)
- Joseph Wightman (1867–1870)
- John Yeo (1871–1873)
- Stanislaus Francis Perry (1873)

=== Speakers since Confederation ===
Name Electoral district (Birth–Death)	Term of office	Party	General Assembly
Cornelius Howatt; MLA for 4th Prince (1810–1895)	1874–1876	Conservative	26th
Henry Beer; MLA for 3rd Queens (1835–1886)	1877–1879	Liberal	27th
John Alexander Macdonald; MLA for 3rd Prince (1838–1905)	1879–1889	Conservative	28th
John Alexander Macdonald; MLA for 3rd Prince (1838–1905)	1879–1889	Conservative	29th
John Alexander Macdonald; MLA for 3rd Prince (1838–1905)	1879–1889	Conservative	30th
Patrick Blake; MLA for 5th Queens (1846–1909)	1890–1891	Conservative	31st
Bernard Donald McLellan; MLA for 1st Prince (1859–1907)	1891–1893	Liberal	31st
James Cummiskey; Councillor for 3rd Queens (1850–1925)	1894–1900	Liberal	32nd
James Cummiskey; Councillor for 3rd Queens (1850–1925)	1894–1900	Liberal	33rd
Samuel E. Reid; Assemblyman for 4th Prince (1854–1924)	1901–1904	Liberal	34th
Albert E. Douglas; Assemblyman for 2nd Queens (1860–1908)	1905–1908	Liberal	35th
Matthew Smith; Assemblyman for 1st Queens (1843–1909)	1908–1909	Liberal	36th
John Agnew; Councillor for 1st Prince (1853–1928)	1909–1911	Liberal	36th
J. Edward Wyatt; Councillor for 5th Prince (1860–1932)	1912–1915	Conservative	37th
John S. Martin; Assemblyman for 4th Queens (1855–1946)	1916–1917	Conservative	38th
Albert Prowse; Assemblyman for 4th Kings (1855–1946)	1918–1919	Conservative	38th
Charles Gavan Duffy; Councillor for 5th Queens (1874–1958)	1920–1923	Liberal	39th
Louis Jenkins; Councillor for 2nd Queens (1860–1939)	1924–1927	Conservative	40th
David McDonald; Councillor for 3rd Queens (1862–1939)	1928–1931	Liberal	41st
W. F. Alan Stewart; Councillor for 1st Queens (1885–1956)	1931	Liberal	41st
Augustine A. MacDonald; Assemblyman for 1st Kings (1876–1970)	1932–1934	Conservative	42nd
Heath Strong; Assemblyman for 4th Prince (1882–1950)	1934–1935	Conservative	42nd
Stephen Hessian; Councillor for 3rd Kings (1891–1962)	1935–1939	Liberal	43rd
W. F. Alan Stewart; Councillor for 1st Queens (1885–1956)	1940–1944	Liberal	44th
Thomas R. Cullen; Councillor for 2nd Kings (1904–1984)	1944–1947	Liberal	45th
Eugene Cullen; Councillor for 3rd Queens (1905–1995)	1948–1949	Liberal	46th
Forrest Phillips; Councillor for 2nd Prince (1887–1972)	1949–1955	Liberal	46th
Forrest Phillips; Councillor for 2nd Prince (1887–1972)	1949–1955	Liberal	47th
Augustin Gallant; Assemblyman for 3rd Prince (1916–1994)	1955–1959	Liberal	48th
Edward P. Foley; Assemblyman for 5th Prince (1891–1980)	1959	Liberal	48th
John R. McLean; Assemblyman for 1st Kings (1906–1964)	1960–1964	Progressive Conservative	49th
John R. McLean; Assemblyman for 1st Kings (1906–1964)	1960–1964	Progressive Conservative	50th
Frank Myers; Assemblyman for 1st Queens (1908–1975)	1965–1966	Progressive Conservative	50th
Prosper Arsenault; Assemblyman for 1st Prince (1894–1987)	1966–1970	Liberal	51st
Cecil A. Miller; Assemblyman for 3rd Queens (1896–1988)	1970–1978	Liberal	52nd
Cecil A. Miller; Assemblyman for 3rd Queens (1896–1988)	1970–1978	Liberal	53rd
Russell Perry; Assemblyman for 1st Prince (1915–1981)	1978	Liberal	54th
Daniel Compton; Councillor for 4th Queens (1915–1990)	1979–1983	Progressive Conservative	55th
Marion Reid; Assemblywoman for 1st Queens (1929–2023)	1983–1986	Progressive Conservative	56th
Edward Clark; Councillor for 3rd Prince (born 1932)	1986–1993	Liberal	57th
Edward Clark; Councillor for 3rd Prince (born 1932)	1986–1993	Liberal	58th
Nancy Guptill; Councillor for 5th Prince (1941–2020)	1993–1996	Liberal	59th
Wilbur MacDonald; MLA for Belfast-Pownal Bay (1933–2020)	1997–2000	Progressive Conservative	60th
Mildred Dover; MLA for Tracadie-Fort Augustus (born 1941)	2000–2003	Progressive Conservative	61st
Gregory Deighan; MLA for Wilmot-Summerside (born 1939)	2003–2007	Progressive Conservative	62nd
Kathleen Casey; MLA for Charlottetown-Lewis Point (born 1961)	2007–2011	Liberal	63rd
Carolyn Bertram; MLA for Rustico-Emerald (born 1976)	2011–2015	Liberal	64th
Buck Watts; MLA for Tracadie-Hillsborough Park (born 1944)	2015–2019	Liberal	65th
Colin LaVie; MLA for Souris-Elmira (born 1962)	2019–2023	Progressive Conservative	66th
Darlene Compton; MLA for Belfast-Murray River (born 1961)	2023–2025	Progressive Conservative	67th
Sidney MacEwen; MLA for Morell-Donagh (born 1979)	2025–2026	Progressive Conservative	67th
Brad Trivers; MLA for Rustico-Emerald (born 1971)	2026–present	Progressive Conservative	67th

== See also ==
- Speaker (politics)
- Speaker of the House of Commons of Canada
