= Legislative Council of Prince Edward Island =

Type
- Type: Upper house of the General Assembly of Prince Edward Island

History
- Founded: 1773
- Disbanded: 1893
- Preceded by: none
- Succeeded by: none

The Legislative Council of Prince Edward Island was the upper house of the General Assembly of the Canadian province of Prince Edward Island. It existed from 1773 to 1893. Members were appointed by the lieutenant governor of Prince Edward Island on the advice of the premier until 1862 when it became an elected body, elected by property owners.

In 1893, PEI became unicameral. The Legislative Council and House of Assembly were amalgamated into the Legislative Assembly of Prince Edward Island, a single body with an "assemblyman" and a "councillor" elected from each electoral district.

== See also ==
- Legislative council
