= Thomas Heath Haviland =

Canadian Father of Confederation (1822–1895)

The Honourable Thomas Heath Haviland
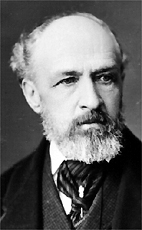
- Thomas Heath Haviland (1879)

Member of the Legislative Assembly of Prince Edward Island for Georgetown
- In office 1846–1876

Member of the Senate of Canada
- In office October 18, 1873 – July 1879

3rd Lieutenant Governor of Prince Edward Island
- In office July 10, 1879 – July 18, 1884
- Monarch: Victoria
- Governors General: Marquess of Lorne; The Marquess of Lansdowne
- Premier: William Wilfred Sullivan
- Preceded by: Robert Hodgson
- Succeeded by: Andrew Archibald Macdonald

Personal details
- Born: November 13, 1822 Charlottetown, Prince Edward Island
- Died: September 11, 1895 (aged 72) Charlottetown, Prince Edward Island, Canada
- Party: Conservative
- Spouse: Annie Elizabeth (m. 1847)
- Relations: Thomas Heath Haviland Sr. (father)
- Children: 7
- Occupation: Notary, lawyer, and landowner
- Profession: Politician
- Cabinet: Provincial Secretary 1873–1876

Thomas Heath Haviland (November 13, 1822 – September 11, 1895) was a Canadian lawyer, politician and father of Canadian Confederation. He was born in, and died in Charlottetown, Prince Edward Island. He was appointed to the Senate of Canada on October 18, 1873, and represented Prince Edward Island as a Conservative until his resignation in July 1879.

Haviland was a Freemason of Victoria Lodge No. 383 (Scotland).

== Early life and education ==
Thomas Heath Haviland was born on November 13, 1822, in Charlottetown, Prince Edward Island, to Thomas Heath Haviland Sr., an English-born emigrant to Prince Edward Island and wealthy landowner, and Jane Rebecca Brecken. Haviland attended elementary school in Charlottetown, and was further educated at a private school in Brussels, Belgium. Upon his return, Haviland took law education under James Horsfield Peters.

== Career ==
In 1846, Haviland was called to the bar. He was elected to the Legislative Assembly of Prince Edward Island for Georgetown and Royalty in 1846 and served until 1876. Haviland served in the provincial Executive Council from 1859 to 1862, from 1865 to 1867 and from 1870 to 1872. From 1863 to 1864, he was speaker for the assembly. He was also a colonel in the local militia. Haviland served as the third Lieutenant Governor of Prince Edward Island from 1879 to 1884. In 1886, he became mayor of Charlottetown after the death of Henry Beer, serving until 1893 when he retired due to poor health.

== Personal life and death ==
Haviland married Anne Elizabeth Grubbe on January 5, 1847; they had seven children, two of whom died during infancy.

Haviland died in Charlottetown on September 11, 1895.
