= Joseph Pope (politician) =

Canadian politician

Joseph Pope (June 20, 1803 – September 3, 1895) was a businessman and political figure in Prince Edward Island, Canada. He represented Prince County in the Legislative Assembly of Prince Edward Island from 1830 to 1853.

He was born in Turnchapel, Plymstock, England, the son of Thomas Pope, was educated at West Hore, Plymstock and came to Prince Edward Island in 1819, entering a timber business established by his brother and half-brother. He married Lucy Colledge in 1824. In 1828, Pope took over the operation of the business after his partners returned to England; he also became land agent for a land owner in the Bedeque area in the same year. Pope was also involved in ship building. In 1830, he married Eliza Campbell after the death of his first wife. Pope was named to the Executive Council in 1839 and also served as speaker for the assembly from 1843 to 1849. In 1848, he married Eliza M. Cooke. Pope was a major in the local militia and a tax collector. He was named treasurer for the colony in 1851. He left the island in 1853, with the intention of moving to Australia, but his wife's illness forced him to settle in Liverpool, where he became a merchant. In 1868, he returned to the island. Two years later, his son James, then the island's premier, named him colonial treasurer and manager of the government Savings Bank. He also served as commissioner of crown and public lands. Pope retired in 1883 and died in Charlottetown in 1895.

His son William served in the provincial assembly.
