= Donald Montgomery =

Canadian politician

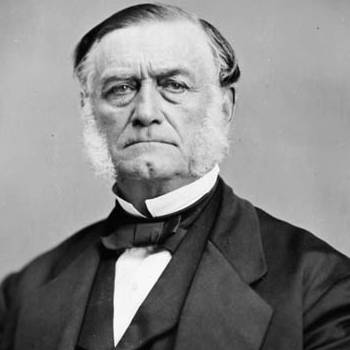
Donald Montgomery Source: Library and Archives Canada

Donald Montgomery (January 19, 1808 – July 31, 1893) was a farmer and politician from Prince Edward Island. He represented Princetown and then 1st Queens in the Legislative Assembly of Prince Edward Island from 1838 to 1874 as a Conservative member and served as a Conservative member of the Senate of Canada from 1873 until his death. Montgomery Manor in Park Corner, PEI, is where Donald Montgomery and his wife, Ann Murray raised their family.

He was born in Fox Point, Princetown, Lot 18, Prince Edward Island, the son of Daniel Montgomery & Ann/Nancy Penman. Daniel or Donald Montgomery was a Scottish immigrant and long-time member of the provincial assembly. Montgomery was educated in Princetown. In 1835, he married Ann Murray and, in 1861, married Louisa Gall after the death of his first wife. He was also a member of the Legislative Council of Prince Edward Island from 1862 to 1874. Montgomery was speaker for the Legislative Assembly from 1859 to 1862 and for the Legislative Council from 1863 to 1874.

His granddaughter Lucy Maud Montgomery wrote a series of books based on the island including Anne of Green Gables.
