= Edward Palmer (Canadian politician) =

Canadian Father of Confederation (1809–1889)

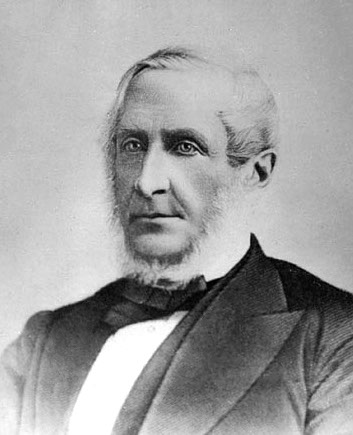
Edward Palmer

Edward Palmer (September 1, 1809 – November 3, 1889) was a Canadian politician born in Charlottetown, Prince Edward Island, and resided in Prince Edward Island until his death. He is considered one of the Fathers of the Canadian Confederation, despite his opposition to Confederation, as he was a delegate to both the Charlottetown and Quebec Conferences.

== Early life ==
Edward Palmer was the son of James Bardin Palmer, an Irish barrister who had come to the Island at the beginning of the nineteenth century, and Millicent Jones. He attended grammar school before becoming a law clerk in his father's law firm. He was called to the bar in 1830 and thereafter he worked as a lawyer, land agent, land proprietor, politician, and judge, being appointed Queen's Counsel in 1873. He was a very active politician and later a judge. He married Isabella Tremain in 1846. He acted as a land agent and was a landed proprietor but, after experiencing long term conflict with his tenant farmers, he sold his substantial landholdings in 1870.

== Political life ==
He was elected as a member of the Prince Edward Island House of Assembly for Charlottetown and Quebec in 1835. He soon established himself as one of the leading Conservatives. He was often viewed as a champion of the status quo, being against responsible government, against the union of the colonies of British North America, and against land reform. He was also much given to conflict in the assembly, frequently arguing with both George Coles and Edward Whelan. In 1849, Palmer became the leader of the Tories in the provincial assembly. In 1859, he became premier, only to be pushed from office by his colleague John Hamilton Gray in 1863. He was first appointed to the Legislative Council in 1860 and when that body became elective he retained his seat.

His views against Confederation placed him in direct opposition to John Hamilton Gray. Their conflict fractured the Tory party and damaged the union cause, eventually resulting in both Palmer and Gray resigning from Cabinet. Palmer, however, retained his position as attorney general.

Palmer remained ardently opposed to Confederation after 1864. He also opposed the "Better Terms" offer made by Canada in 1869. Instead, he favoured a free trade deal between Prince Edward Island and the United States. In 1872, Palmer changed parties and joined the Liberal, anti-Confederation government of Robert Poore Haythorne. When the financial burden of a railway project forced Prince Edward Island to the brink of economic collapse it was the Haythorne government, of which Palmer was a member, that sought the union with Canada in 1873. After Prince Edward Island joined the Confederation, Palmer became a Queens County judge and was later elevated to Chief Justice of Prince Edward Island, holding that position until his death.
