= List of lieutenant governors of Prince Edward Island =

The following is a list of the governors and lieutenant governors of Prince Edward Island, known as St. John's Island until 1799. Though the present day office of the lieutenant governor in Prince Edward Island came into being only upon the province's entry into Canadian Confederation in 1873, the post is a continuation from the first governorship of St. John's Island in 1769.

== Governors of St. John's Island, 1769–1786 ==
#	Name	Governor from	Governor until
Governors under George III (1769–1786):
1.	Walter Patterson	14 July 1769	4 November 1786

== Lieutenant governors of St. John's Island, 1786–1799 ==
#	Name	Lieutenant governor from	Lieutenant governor until
Lieutenant governors under George III (1786–1799):
2.	Edmund Fanning	4 November 1786	1 February 1799

== Lieutenant governors of Prince Edward Island, 1799–1873 ==
#	Name	Lieutenant governor from	Lieutenant governor until
Lieutenant governors under George III (1799–1820):
2.	Edmund Fanning	1 February 1799	10 May 1804
3.	Joseph Frederick Wallet DesBarres	10 May 1804	→
	William Townshend (acting Governor)	5 August 1812	24 July 1813
3.	cont...	←	24 July 1813
4.	Charles Douglass Smith	24 July 1813	→
Lieutenant governors under George IV (1820–1830):
4.	cont...	←	19 April 1824
5.	John Ready	19 April 1824	→
Lieutenant governors under William IV (1830–1837):
5.	cont...	←	16 March 1831
6.	Sir Murray Maxwell	16 March 1831	26 July 1831
7.	Sir Aretas William Young	26 July 1831	1 December 1835
8.	George Wright	1 December 1835	30 August 1836
9.	Sir John Harvey	30 August 1836	→
Lieutenant governors under Victoria (1837–1873):
9.	cont...	←	31 March 1837
10.	Sir Charles Augustus FitzRoy	31 March 1837	2 November 1841
8.	George Wright	2 November 1841	13 November 1841
11.	Sir Henry Vere Huntley	13 November 1841	1 November 1847
12.	Sir Donald Campbell, 1st Baronet	9 December 1847	18 October 1850
13.	Ambrose Lane	18 October 1850	10 March 1851
14.	Sir Alexander Bannerman	10 March 1851	11 July 1854
15.	Sir Dominick Daly	11 July 1854	25 May 1859
16.	Charles Young	25 May 1859	8 June 1859
17.	George Dundas	8 June 1859	22 October 1868
18.	Sir Robert Hodgson	22 October 1868	6 October 1870
19.	Sir William Cleaver Francis Robinson	6 October 1870	1 July 1873

== Lieutenant governors of Prince Edward Island, 1873–present ==
#	Name	Lieutenant governor from	Lieutenant governor until
Lieutenant governors under Victoria (1873–1901):
19.	Sir William Cleaver Francis Robinson	1 July 1873	4 July 1874
18.	Sir Robert Hodgson	4 July 1874	10 July 1879
20.	Thomas Heath Haviland	10 July 1879	18 July 1884
21.	Andrew Archibald Macdonald	18 July 1884	2 September 1889
22.	Jedediah Slason Carvell	2 September 1889	14 February 1894
23.	George William Howlan	21 February 1894	23 May 1899
24.	Peter Adolphus McIntyre	23 May 1899	→
Lieutenant governors under Edward VII (1901–1910):
24.	cont...	←	3 October 1904
25.	Donald Alexander MacKinnon	3 October 1904	→
Lieutenant governors under George V (1910–1936):
25.	cont...	←	1 June 1910
26.	Benjamin Rogers	1 June 1910	3 June 1915
27.	Augustine Colin Macdonald	3 June 1915	16 July 1919
28.	Murdock MacKinnon	2 September 1919	8 September 1924
29.	Frank Richard Heartz	8 September 1924	19 November 1930
30.	Charles Dalton	19 November 1930	9 December 1933
31.	George Des Brisay de Blois	28 December 1933	→
Lieutenant governors under Edward VIII (1936):
31.	cont...	←	→
Lieutenant governors under George VI (1936–1952):
31.	cont...	←	11 September 1939
32.	Bradford William LePage	11 September 1939	18 May 1945
33.	Joseph Alphonsus Bernard	18 May 1945	4 October 1950
34.	Thomas William Lemuel Prowse	4 October 1950	→
Lieutenant governors under Elizabeth II (1952–2022):
34.	cont...	←	31 March 1958
35.	Frederick Walter Hyndman	31 March 1958	1 August 1963
36.	Willibald Joseph MacDonald	1 August 1963	6 October 1969
37.	John George MacKay	6 October 1969	24 October 1974
38.	Gordon Lockhart Bennett	24 October 1974	14 January 1980
39.	Joseph Aubin Doiron	14 January 1980	1 August 1985
40.	Lloyd MacPhail	1 August 1985	16 August 1990
41.	Marion Reid	16 August 1990	30 August 1995
42.	Gilbert Clements	30 August 1995	8 May 2001
43.	Léonce Bernard	28 May 2001	31 July 2006
44.	Barbara Oliver Hagerman	31 July 2006	15 August 2011
45. (Note: Colour denotes living former lieutenant governors)	Frank Lewis	15 August 2011	20 October 2017
46.	Antoinette Perry	20 October 2017	→
Lieutenant governors under Charles III (2022–present):
46.	cont...	←	17 October 2024
47.	Wassim Salamoun	17 October 2024	present

== See also ==
- Office-holders of Canada
- Canadian incumbents by year
