= 59th General Assembly of Prince Edward Island =

The 59th General Assembly of Prince Edward Island was in session from June 7, 1993, to October 21, 1996. The Liberal Party led by Catherine Callbeck formed the government. After Callbeck's resignation, Keith Milligan became party leader and premier in October 1996.

Nancy Guptill was elected speaker.

There were four sessions of the 59th General Assembly:

Session	Start	End
1st	June 7, 1993	August 11, 1993
2nd	March 9, 1994	May 19, 1994
3rd	March 9, 1995	May 4, 1995
4th	February 29, 1996	May 2, 1996

== Members ==
=== Kings ===
District	Assemblyman	Party	First elected / previously elected
1st Kings	Roger Soloman	Liberal	1993
2nd Kings	Claude Matheson	Liberal	1989
3rd Kings	Peter Doucette	Liberal	1989
4th Kings	Stanley Bruce	Liberal	1984
5th Kings	Rose Marie MacDonald	Liberal	1988
District	Councillor	Party	First elected / previously elected
1st Kings	Ross Young	Liberal	1991
2nd Kings	Walter Bradley	Liberal	1989
3rd Kings	Roberta Hubley	Liberal	1989
4th Kings	Gilbert R. Clements (Note: named Lieutenant-Governor in 1995)	Liberal	1970, 1979
5th Kings	Barry Hicken	Liberal	1986

=== Prince ===
District	Assemblyman	Party	First elected / previously elected
1st Prince	Robert Morrissey	Liberal	1982
2nd Prince	Keith Milligan	Liberal	1981
3rd Prince	Robert Maddix	Liberal	1993
4th Prince	Stavert Huestis	Liberal	1984
5th Prince	Walter McEwen	Liberal	1989
District	Councillor	Party	First elected / previously elected
1st Prince	Hector MacLeod	Liberal	1993
2nd Prince	Randy Cooke (Note: resigned in 1995)	Liberal	1993
2nd Prince	Randy Cooke	Independent	1993
3rd Prince	Edward Clark (Note: resigned in 1996)	Liberal	1970
4th Prince	Libbe Hubley	Liberal	1989
5th Prince	Nancy Guptill	Liberal	1987

=== Queens ===
District	Assemblyman	Party	First elected / previously elected
1st Queens	Marion Murphy	Liberal	1989
2nd Queens	Gordon MacInnis	Liberal	1986
3rd Queens	Pat Mella	Progressive; Conservative	1993
4th Queens	Alan Buchanan	Liberal	1989
5th Queens	Wayne Cheverie	Liberal	1986
6th Queens	Jeannie Lea	Liberal	1993
District	Councillor	Party	First elected / previously elected
1st Queens	Catherine Sophia Callbeck	Liberal	1974, (Note: 4th Prince (Assemblyman)) 1993
2nd Queens	Ron MacKinley	Liberal	1985
3rd Queens	Tom Dunphy	Liberal	1986
4th Queens	Lynwood MacPherson	Liberal	1986
5th Queens	Tim Carroll	Liberal	1986
6th Queens	Paul Connolly	Liberal	1982
