= 58th General Assembly of Prince Edward Island =

The 58th General Assembly of Prince Edward Island was in session from June 15, 1989, to March 1, 1993. The Liberal Party led by Joe Ghiz formed the government. Catherine Callbeck became party leader and Premier in January 1993 after Ghiz retired from politics.

Edward Clark was elected speaker.

There were four sessions of the 58th General Assembly:

Session	Start	End
1st	June 15, 1989	June 20, 1989
2nd	February 22, 1990	April 26, 1990
3rd	March 19, 1991	May 9, 1991
4th	March 23, 1992	November 5, 1992

== Members ==
=== Kings ===
District	Assemblyman	Party	First elected / previously elected
1st Kings	Ross "Johnny" Young	Liberal	1978
1st Kings	Ross Young (1991)	Liberal	1991
2nd Kings	Claude Matheson	Liberal	1989
3rd Kings	Peter Doucette	Liberal	1989
4th Kings	Stanley Bruce	Liberal	1984
5th Kings	Rose Marie MacDonald	Liberal	1988
District	Councillor	Party	First elected / previously elected
1st Kings	Albert Fogarty	Progressive; Conservative	1979
2nd Kings	Walter Bradley	Liberal	1989
3rd Kings	Roberta Hubley	Liberal	1989
4th Kings	Gilbert R. Clements	Liberal	1970, 1979
5th Kings	Barry Hicken	Liberal	1986

=== Prince ===
District	Assemblyman	Party	First elected / previously elected
1st Prince	Robert Morrissey	Liberal	1982
2nd Prince	Keith Milligan	Liberal	1981
3rd Prince	Léonce Bernard	Liberal	1975
4th Prince	Stavert Huestis	Liberal	1984
5th Prince	Walter McEwen	Liberal	1989
District	Councillor	Party	First elected / previously elected
1st Prince	Robert E. Campbell	Liberal	1962
2nd Prince	Allison Ellis	Liberal	1978
2nd Prince	Allison Ellis	Independent	1978
3rd Prince	Edward Clark	Liberal	1970
4th Prince	Libbe Hubley	Liberal	1989
5th Prince	Nancy Guptill	Liberal	1987

=== Queens ===
District	Assemblyman	Party	First elected / previously elected
1st Queens	Marion Murphy	Liberal	1989
2nd Queens	Gordon MacInnis	Liberal	1986
3rd Queens	Betty Jean Brown	Liberal	1986
4th Queens	Alan Buchanan	Liberal	1989
5th Queens	Wayne Cheverie	Liberal	1986
6th Queens	Joseph Atallah Ghiz	Liberal	1982
District	Councillor	Party	First elected / previously elected
1st Queens	Leone Bagnall	Progressive; Conservative	1979
2nd Queens	Ron MacKinley	Liberal	1985
3rd Queens	Tom Dunphy	Liberal	1986
4th Queens	Lynwood MacPherson	Liberal	1986
5th Queens	Tim Carroll	Liberal	1986
6th Queens	Paul Connolly	Liberal	1982
