= 1993 Prince Edward Island general election =

Canadian provincial election

← 1989	March 29, 1993	1996 →

All 32 seats in the Legislative Assembly of Prince Edward Island 17 seats needed for a majority
	First party	Second party
	Lib	PC
Leader	Catherine Callbeck	Pat Mella
Party	Liberal	Progressive Conservative
Leader since	January 23, 1993	November 10, 1990
Leader's seat	1st Queens	3rd Queens
Last election	30 seats, 60.7%	2 seats, 35.8%
Seats won	31	1
Seat change	▲1	▼1
Popular vote	80,443	57,549
Percentage	55.1%	39.5%
Swing	▼5.6pp	▲3.7pp
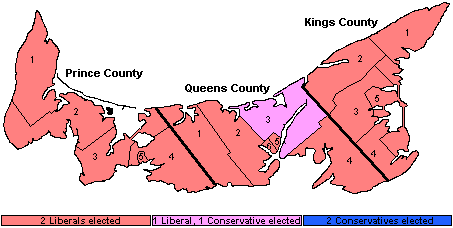
- Map of PEI's ridings coloured in based on how they voted
Premier before election
Catherine Callbeck
Liberal
Premier after election
Catherine Callbeck
Liberal

The 1993 Prince Edward Island general election was held on March 29, 1993.

The campaign resulted in the re-election of the governing Liberals under Premier Catherine Callbeck, the province's first female premier, who had taken over only two months previous from former premier Joe Ghiz. Despite dropping in the popular vote, the Liberals gained on its seat tally, taking 31 of 32 seats, with only PC leader Pat Mella as the sole opposition member in the Legislature.

This election featured several notable events. It was the first to see a female party leader lead her party to a victory in a general election, it was also the first to feature two women leading the two major parties. It was the last to use the dual-member constituencies that had been in place since 1893.

== Party standings ==
↓
31	1
Liberal	PC

Party	Party Leader	Seats			Popular Vote		
Party	Party Leader	1989	Elected	Change	#	%	Change
Liberal	Catherine Callbeck	30	31	+1	80,443	55.1%	-5.6%
Progressive Conservative	Pat Mella	2	1	-1	57,649	39.5%	+3.7%
New Democratic	Larry Duchesne	0	0	-	7,819	5.4%	+1.9%

Popular vote
Liberal	55.13%
PC	39.51%
New Democratic	5.36%

Seats summary
Liberal	96.88%
PC	3.12%

== Members elected ==
The Legislature of Prince Edward Island had two levels of membership from 1893 to 1996 - Assemblymen and Councillors. This was a holdover from when the Island had a bicameral legislature, the General Assembly and the Legislative Council.

In 1893, the Legislative Council was abolished and had its membership merged with the Assembly, though the two titles remained separate and were elected by different electoral franchises. Assemblymen were elected by all eligible voters within a district. Before 1963, Councillors were only elected by landowners within a district, but afterward they were elected in the same manner as Assemblymen.

=== Assemblymen ===
Electoral district	Candidates			Incumbent
Electoral district	Liberal	PC	NDP	Incumbent
1st Kings	Roger Soloman; 1,681	Craig Norton; 1,279		Ross Young
2nd Kings	Claude Matheson; 1,031	Henry Compton; 786	Martin Kenny; 85	Claude Matheson
3rd Kings	Peter Doucette; 1,436	John Callaghan; 1,133		Peter Doucette
4th Kings	Stanley Bruce; 1,540	Marjory Tattrie; 1,053	Janet MacDonald; 164	Stanley Bruce
5th Kings	Rose Marie MacDonald; 1,098	Hal Jamieson; 601		Rose Marie MacDonald
1st Queens	Marion Murphy; 1,598	Wilber Lamont; 1,065	Karen Kelly-Fyfe; 184	Marion Murphy
2nd Queens	Gordon MacInnis; 3,916	George Watts; 2,783	Marlene Hunt; 416	Gordon MacInnis
3rd Queens	Betty Jean Brown; 3,326	Pat Mella; 4,486	Gerry Birt; 301	Betty Jean Brown
4th Queens	Alan Buchanan; 1,343	Wilbur MacDonald; 1,245		Alan Buchanan
5th Queens	Wayne Cheverie; 5,251	Lloyd McKenna; 3,387	Barbara Boudreau; 606	Wayne Cheverie
6th Queens	Jeannie Lea; 3,934	Diane Griffin; 3,300	Heather DeMille; 402	Joe Ghiz
1st Prince	Bobby Morrissey; 3,530	Larry Gaudet; 2,600	Leroy Hiltz; 273	Bobby Morrissey
2nd Prince	Keith Milligan; 1,660	Jimmy Stewart; 816	Grace Coughlin; 246	Keith Milligan
3rd Prince	Robert Maddix; 1,942	Emile Gallant; 1,066		Léonce Bernard
4th Prince	Stavert Huestis; 4,215	Fred McCardle; 2,568	Larry Duchesne; 825	Stavert Huestis
5th Prince	Walter McEwen; 2,179	Greg Deighan; 1,298	Neil Matthews; 255	Walter McEwen

=== Councillor ===
Electoral district	Candidates			Incumbent
Electoral district	Liberal	PC	NDP	Incumbent
1st Kings	Ross Young; 1,702	Peter McQuaid; 1,208	Brian MacDonald; 83	Albert Fogarty
2nd Kings	Walter Bradley; 1,081	Kevin MacAdam; 815		Walter Bradley
3rd Kings	Roberta Hubley; 1,369	Doug Johnston; 1,123	Bruno Peripoli; 106	Roberta Hubley
4th Kings	Gilbert Clements; 1,618	Philip Curley; 912	Alan Hicken; 235	Gilbert Clements
5th Kings	Barry Hicken; 1,202	Wesley Stead; 506		Barry Hicken
1st Queens	Catherine Callbeck; 1,602	Ronald Myers; 1,115	Marvyn Wells; 150	Leone Bagnall
2nd Queens	Ron MacKinley; 4,043	Brian Dollar; 2,729	Gerard Gallant; 368	Ron MacKinley
3rd Queens	Tom Dunphy; 3,940	Mildred Dover; 3,769	Paul McCarron; 389	Tom Dunphy
4th Queens	Lynwood MacPherson; 1,553	Lou Douse; 1,034		Lynwood MacPherson
5th Queens	Tim Carroll; 4,463	Chester Gillan; 4,199	Mickey MacDonald; 579	Tim Carroll
6th Queens	Paul Connolly; 4,365	Stuart Drummond; 2,732	Ronald Kelly; 515	Paul Connolly
1st Prince	Hector MacLeod; 3,354	Gary Morgan; 2,751	Ed Kilfoil; 297	Bob Campbell
2nd Prince	Randy Cooke; 1,459	Donna Williams; 720	Herb Dickieson; 540	Allison Ellis
3rd Prince	Edward Clark; 2,229	Lorne Ramsay; 794		Edward Clark
4th Prince	Libbe Hubley; 4,342	Don MacFarlane; 2,668	Margaret Arsenault; 598	Libbe Hubley
5th Prince	Nancy Guptill; 2,441	Mac MacDonald; 1,108	Gordon Whitlock; 202	Nancy Guptill
