= 57th General Assembly of Prince Edward Island =

The 57th General Assembly of Prince Edward Island was in session from June 9, 1986, to May 2, 1989. The Liberal Party led by Joe Ghiz formed the government.

Edward Clark was elected speaker.

There were four sessions of the 57th General Assembly:

Session	Start	End
1st	June 9, 1986	July 18, 1986
2nd	February 2, 1987	May 14, 1987
3rd	February 22, 1988	May 17, 1988
4th	February 13, 1989	February 13, 1989

== Members ==
=== Kings ===
District	Assemblyman	Party	First elected / previously elected
1st Kings	Ross "Johnny" Young	Liberal	1978
2nd Kings	Roddy Pratt	Progressive; Conservative	1978
3rd Kings	A. A. "Joey" Fraser	Progressive; Conservative	1981
4th Kings	Stanley Bruce	Liberal	1984
5th Kings	Arthur J. MacDonald	Liberal	1962, 1970
5th Kings	Rose Marie MacDonald (1988)	Liberal	1988
District	Councillor	Party	First elected / previously elected
1st Kings	Albert Fogarty	Progressive; Conservative	1979
2nd Kings	Francis O'Brien	Progressive; Conservative	1982
3rd Kings	Peter MacLeod	Progressive; Conservative	1982
4th Kings	Gilbert R. Clements	Liberal	1970, 1979
5th Kings	Barry Hicken	Liberal	1986

=== Prince ===
District	Assemblyman	Party	First elected / previously elected
1st Prince	Robert Morrissey	Liberal	1982
2nd Prince	Keith Milligan	Liberal	1981
3rd Prince	Léonce Bernard	Liberal	1975
4th Prince	Stavert Huestis	Liberal	1984
5th Prince	George McMahon	Progressive; Conservative	1976
5th Prince	Andrew "Andy" Walker (1986)	Progressive; Conservative	1986
District	Councillor	Party	First elected / previously elected
1st Prince	Robert E. Campbell	Liberal	1962
2nd Prince	Allison Ellis	Liberal	1978
3rd Prince	Edward Clark	Liberal	1970
4th Prince	Prowse Chappel	Progressive; Conservative	1978
5th Prince	Peter Pope	Progressive; Conservative	1979
5th Prince	Nancy Evelyn Guptill (1987)	Liberal	1987

=== Queens ===
District	Assemblyman	Party	First elected / previously elected
1st Queens	Marion Reid	Progressive; Conservative	1979
2nd Queens	Gordon MacInnis	Liberal	1986
3rd Queens	Betty Jean Brown	Liberal	1986
4th Queens	Wilbur MacDonald	Progressive; Conservative	1982
5th Queens	Wayne Cheverie	Liberal	1986
6th Queens	Joseph Atallah Ghiz	Liberal	1982
District	Councillor	Party	First elected / previously elected
1st Queens	Leone Bagnall	Progressive; Conservative	1979
2nd Queens	Ron MacKinley	Liberal	1985
3rd Queens	Tom Dunphy	Liberal	1986
4th Queens	Lynwood MacPherson	Liberal	1986
5th Queens	Tim Carroll	Liberal	1986
6th Queens	Paul Connolly	Liberal	1982
