= 1996 Prince Edward Island general election =

Canadian provincial election

← 1993	November 18, 1996	2000 →

All 27 seats in the Legislative Assembly of Prince Edward Island 14 seats needed for a majority
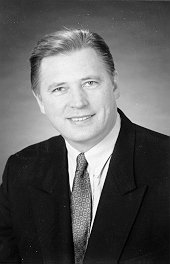
	First party	Second party	Third party
	PC	Lib
Leader	Pat Binns	Keith Milligan	Herb Dickieson
Party	Progressive Conservative	Liberal	New Democratic
Leader since	May 4, 1996	October 5, 1996	March 1995
Leader's seat	Murray River-Gaspereaux	Cascumpec-Grand River	West Point-Bloomfield
Last election	1 seat, 39.5%	31 seats, 55.1%	0 seats, 5.4%
Seats before	1	31	0
Seats won	18	8	1
Seat change	▲17	▼23	▲1
Popular vote	37,910	35,802	6,283
Percentage	47.4%	44.8%	7.9%
Swing	▲7.9pp	▼10.3pp	▲2.5pp
- Popular vote by riding. As this is an FPTP election, seat totals are not determined by popular vote, but instead via plurality results by each riding.
Premier before election
Keith Milligan
Liberal
Premier after election
Pat Binns
Progressive Conservative

The 1996 Prince Edward Island general election was held on November 18, 1996. It was the first election in the province's history to not use multi-member constituencies, and instead elect a single member in each of 27 districts. (Previously, since 1873 the province had been divided into 15 or 16 districts, each electing two members.)

The governing Liberals of Premier Keith Milligan, who had been in power since Joe Ghiz first won government in 1986, lost to the resurgent Progressive Conservatives under their new leader, Pat Binns.

This was also the first election where a party other than the Liberals or Tories won a seat in the Legislature, with New Democratic Party leader Herb Dickieson winning a three-way race in a Prince County riding.

This election was the only one in PEI history where a party formed government without winning a majority of the vote until the 2015 election.

== Party standings ==
↓
18	8	1
PC	Liberal	NDP

Party	Party Leader	Seats			Popular Vote	
Party	Party Leader	1993	Elected	Change	#	%
Progressive Conservative	Pat Binns	1	18	+17	37,910	47.39%
Liberal	Keith Milligan	31	8	-23	35,802	44.76%
New Democrats	Herb Dickieson	-	1	+1	6,283	7.85
Total		32	27		79,995	100%

Popular vote
PC	47.39%
Liberal	44.76%
New Democratic	7.85%

Seats summary
PC	66.67%
Liberal	29.63%
New Democratic	3.70%

== Members elected ==
Electoral district	Candidates			Incumbent
Electoral district	PC	Liberal	NDP	Incumbent
1. Souris-Elmira	Andy Mooney; 1,287	Ross Young; 1,159	Brian MacDonald; 54	Ross Young & Roger Soloman†; 1st Kings
2. Morell-Fortune Bay	Kevin MacAdam; 1,347	Walter Bradley; 1,269	Kathy Murphy; 40	Walter Bradley & Claude Matheson†; 2nd Kings
3. Georgetown-Baldwin's Road	Michael Currie; 1,463	Rose Marie MacDonald; 1,182	Patricia Allen; 43	Peter Doucette† & Roberta Hubley†; 3rd Kings
3. Georgetown-Baldwin's Road	Michael Currie; 1,463	Rose Marie MacDonald; 1,182	Patricia Allen; 43	Merged riding
3. Georgetown-Baldwin's Road	Michael Currie; 1,463	Rose Marie MacDonald; 1,182	Patricia Allen; 43	Rose Marie MacDonald & Barry Hicken‡ 5th Kings
4. Montague-Kilmuir	Jim Bagnall; 1,259	Beverly Deelstra; 964	Janet Gillis; 71	New District
5. Murray River-Gaspereaux	Pat Binns; 1,309	Barry Hicken; 1,022	Alan Hicken; 112	Stanley Bruce †; 4th Kings
6. Belfast-Pownal Bay	Wilbur MacDonald; 1,275	Lynwood MacPherson; 1,242	Edith Perry; 99	Lynwood MacPherson; 4th Queens
7. Glen Stewart-Bellevue Cove	Pat Mella; 2,357	Mary Hughes; 914	Pat Burgoyne; 146	Pat Mella (PC) & Tom Dunphy† (Lib); 3rd Queens
8. Tracadie-Fort Augustus	Mildred Dover; 1,511	Alan McIsaac; 1,279	Suzanne Gibler; 90	Pat Mella (PC) & Tom Dunphy† (Lib); 3rd Queens
9. Stanhope-East Royalty	Jamie Ballem; 1,625	Eddie Reardon; 1,404	Leo Cheverie; 165	New District
10. Sherwood-Hillsborough	Elmer MacFadyen; 1,585	Larry Hughes; 1,212	Ronald Kelly; 207	Wayne Cheverie; 5th Queens
11. Parkdale-Belvedere	Chester Gillan; 1,584	Stephen Dowling; 1,008	Larry Duchesne; 169	Wayne Cheverie; 5th Queens
12. Charlottetown-Kings Square	Brian McKenna; 1,075	Wayne Cheverie; 1,345	Sybil Frei; 363	Wayne Cheverie; 5th Queens
13. Charlottetown-Rochford Square	Jeff Lantz; 1,242	Paul Connolly; 1,348	Mark Forrest; 226	Paul Connolly; 6th Queens
14. Charlottetown-Spring Park	Wes MacAleer; 1,481	Ian MacDonald; 1,119	Leo Broderick; 862	Paul Connolly; 6th Queens
15. Winsloe-West Royalty	Don MacKinnon; 1,751	Perley MacNeill; 1,575	James Rodd; 190	New District
16. North River-Rice Point	Brian Dollar; 1,606	Ron MacKinley; 1,958	Marlene Hunt; 224	Gordon MacInnis‡ & Ron MacKinley; 2nd Queens
17. Crapaud-Hazel Grove	Norman MacPhee; 1,666	Eric MacArthur; 1,529	J'Nan Brown; 312	Marion Murphy†; 1st Queens
18. Park Corner-Oyster Bed	Beth MacKenzie; 1,824	Gordon MacInnis; 1,652	Gerard Gallant; 187	New District
19. Borden-Kinkora	Eric Hammill; 1,521	Stavert Huestis; 1,310	Gerard Sexton; 195	Stavert Huestis & Libbe Hubley†; 4th Prince
20. Kensington-Malpeque	Mitch Murphy; 2,020	Bill Campbell; 1,312	Calvin Roberts; 227	New District
21. Wilmot-Summerside	Greg Deighan; 1,506	Walter McEwen; 1,394	Bill McKinnon; 492	Walter McEwen & Nancy Guptill; 5th Prince
22. St. Eleanors-Summerside	Gardiner MacNeill; 1,145	Nancy Guptill; 1,716	Marsha Arseneault; 307	Walter McEwen & Nancy Guptill; 5th Prince
23. Cascumpec-Grand River	Barry Balsom; 715	Keith Milligan; 1,823	Donna Lewis; 162	Keith Milligan; 2nd Prince
24. Evangeline-Miscouche	Gerard Richard; 735	Robert Maddix; 1,519	Gerard Bernard; 188	Robert Maddix; 3rd Prince
25. West Point-Bloomfield	Gary Morgan; 695	Fairley Yeo; 783	Herb Dickieson; 921	New District
26. Alberton-Miminegash	Eddie Trail; 1,127	Hector MacLeod; 1,351	Ed Kilfoil; 175	Bobby Morrissey & Hector MacLeod; 1st Prince
27. Tignish-DeBlois	Gail Shea; 1,149	Bobby Morrissey; 1,413	Howard Waite; 56	Bobby Morrissey & Hector MacLeod; 1st Prince

== See also ==
- 2000 Prince Edward Island general election
- List of Prince Edward Island general elections (post-Confederation)
- List of PEI political parties
