= 1943 Prince Edward Island general election =

Canadian provincial election

← 1939	September 15, 1943	1947 →

All 30 seats in the Legislative Assembly of Prince Edward Island 16 seats needed for a majority
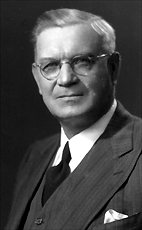

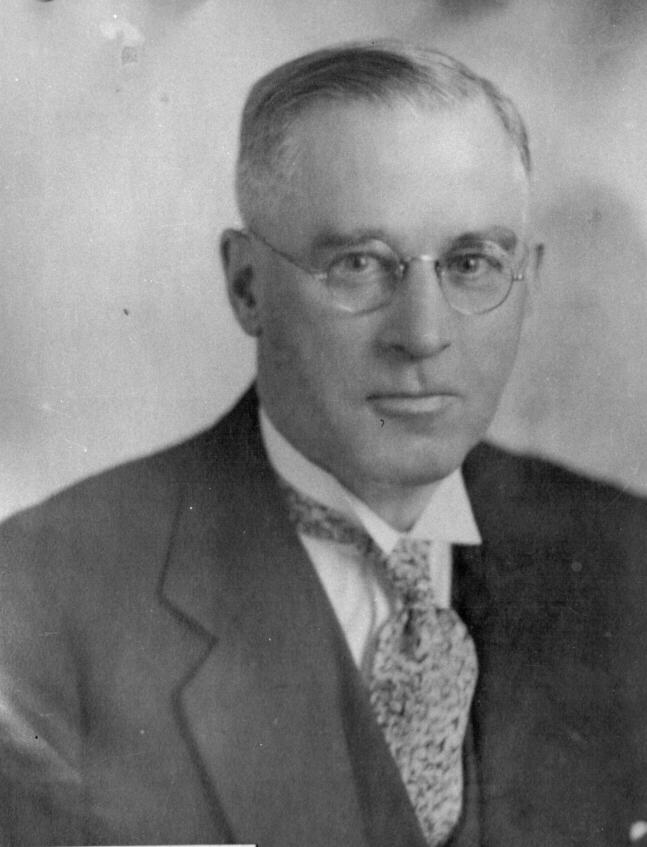
	First party	Second party
Leader	J. Walter Jones	William J. P. MacMillan
Party	Liberal	Progressive Conservative
Leader since	1943	1933
Leader's seat	4th Queens	5th Queens
Last election	27 seats, 53.0%	3 seats, 47.0%
Seats won	20	10
Seat change	▼7	▲7
Popular vote	35,396	31,849
Percentage	51.3%	46.1%
Swing	▼1.7pp	▼0.9pp
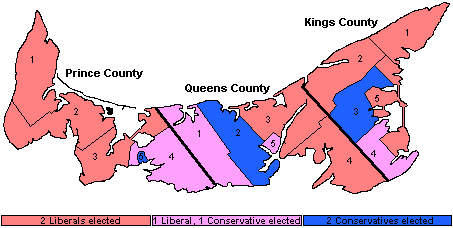
- Map of PEI's ridings coloured in based on how they voted
Premier before election
J. Walter Jones
Liberal
Premier after election
J. Walter Jones
Liberal

The 1943 Prince Edward Island general election was held in the Canadian province of Prince Edward Island on September 15, 1943.

The governing Liberals of Premier J. Walter Jones lost seven seats to the Progressive Conservatives led by former Premier William J.P. MacMillan, but were able to retain a strong majority in the Legislature. Jones became Premier in May 1943 following the elevation of his predecessor Thane Campbell to the position of Chief Justice of the Supreme Court of Prince Edward Island.

This election featured the first appearance of the democratic socialist Co-operative Commonwealth Federation in provincial Island politics. Though they had formed an association in 1936, they did not run any candidates provincially until this election. The CCF ran nine candidates throughout the Island and earned just over 2% of the popular vote, though no seats.

This election also took place during the Second World War.

== Party Standings ==
↓
20	10
Liberal	PC

Party	Party Leader	Seats			Popular Vote		
Party	Party Leader	1939	Elected	Change	#	%	Change
Liberal	J. Walter Jones	27	20	-7	35,396	51.3%	-1.7%
Progressive Conservative	William J. P. MacMillan	3	10	+7	31,849	46.1%	-0.9%
Co-operative Commonwealth		-	-	-	1,436	2.1%	+2.1%
Independent Liberal		-	-	-	379	0.5%	+0.5%

== Members Elected ==
The Legislature of Prince Edward Island had two levels of membership from 1893 to 1996 - Assemblymen and Councillors. This was a holdover from when the Island had a bicameral legislature, the General Assembly and the Legislative Council.

In 1893, the Legislative Council was abolished and had its membership merged with the Assembly, though the two titles remained separate and were elected by different electoral franchises. Assembleymen were elected by all eligible voters of within a district, while Councillors were only elected by landowners within a district.

=== Kings ===
District	Assemblyman	Party	Councillor	Party
1st Kings	Harry S. Francis	Liberal	T. J. Kickham	Liberal
2nd Kings	Harry Cox	Liberal	Thomas R. Cullen	Liberal
3rd Kings	Leslie Hunter	Progressive; Conservative	Francis MacPhee	Progressive; Conservative
4th Kings	John A. Campbell	Liberal	Murdock McGowan	Progressive; Conservative
5th Kings	William Hughes	Liberal	George Saville	Liberal

=== Queens ===
District	Assemblyman	Party	Councillor	Party
1st Queens	Walter G. MacKenzie	Progressive; Conservative	W. F. Alan Stewart	Liberal
2nd Queens	Philip Matheson	Progressive; Conservative	Reginald Bell	Progressive; Conservative
3rd Queens	Russell C. Clark	Liberal	Mark R. MacGuigan	Liberal
4th Queens	Dougald MacKinnon	Liberal	John Walter Jones	Liberal
5th Queens	William Prowse	Liberal	William J. P. MacMillan	Progressive; Conservative

=== Prince ===
District	Assemblyman	Party	Councillor	Party
1st Prince	Joseph A. Bernard	Liberal	Fred Ramsay	Liberal
2nd Prince	George H. Barbour	Liberal	William H. Dennis	Liberal
3rd Prince	Marin Gallant	Liberal	Thomas Linkletter	Liberal
4th Prince	Heath Strong	Progressive; Conservative	Horace Wright	Liberal
5th Prince	Daniel F. MacNeill	Progressive; Conservative	Ernest Strong	Progressive; Conservative
