= Catherine Callbeck =

Canadian politician

The Honourable Catherine S. Callbeck CM OPEI

9th Chancellor of the University of Prince Edward Island
- Incumbent
- Assumed office September 29, 2018
- Preceded by: Don McDougall

28th Premier of Prince Edward Island
- In office January 25, 1993 – October 9, 1996
- Monarch: Elizabeth II
- Lieutenant Governor: Marion L. Reid; Gilbert Clements
- Preceded by: Joe Ghiz
- Succeeded by: Keith Milligan

Senator from Prince Edward Island
- In office September 22, 1997 – July 25, 2014
- Nominated by: Jean Chrétien
- Appointed by: Roméo LeBlanc

Leader of the Prince Edward Island Liberal Party
- In office January 23, 1993 – October 5, 1996
- Preceded by: Joe Ghiz
- Succeeded by: Keith Milligan

MLA (Assemblyman) for 4th Prince
- In office April 29, 1974 – April 24, 1978
- Preceded by: Robert Schurman
- Succeeded by: William MacDougall

MLA (Councillor) for 1st Queens
- In office March 29, 1993 – November 18, 1996
- Preceded by: Leone Bagnall
- Succeeded by: riding abolished

Member of the Canadian Parliament for Malpeque
- In office December 12, 1988 – January 25, 1993
- Preceded by: Melbourne Gass
- Succeeded by: Wayne Easter

Personal details
- Born: July 25, 1939 (age 87) Central Bedeque, Prince Edward Island, Canada
- Party: Liberal (until 2014); Independent Liberal (2014-present)
- Other political affiliations: Prince Edward Island Liberal Party
- Education: Mount Allison University; Dalhousie University; Syracuse University
- Profession: Politician
- Cabinet: Minister of Health and Social Services (1974–1978); Minister responsible for Native Affairs (1974–1978); Minister responsible for the Disabled (1974–1978)
- Website: Catherine Callbeck – Parliament of Canada biography

Catherine Sophia Callbeck CM OPEI (born July 25, 1939) is a retired Canadian politician and the current and ninth Chancellor of the University of Prince Edward Island.

She was the 28th premier of Prince Edward Island from 1993 to 1996, the third female premier in Canadian history, and the first to win a general election (the first female premier, Rita Johnston of British Columbia, became premier after winning the party leadership but lost the subsequent election; the second, Nellie Cournoyea of the Northwest Territories, was elected premier by MLAs following a non-partisan consensus government election). She was subsequently a member of the Senate of Canada from 1997 until her retirement in 2014.

== Early life and career ==
Callbeck was born in Central Bedeque, Prince Edward Island, the daughter of Ralph R. Callbeck and Ruth Campbell. She received a Bachelor of Commerce degree from Mount Allison University in 1960 and a Bachelor of Education degree from Dalhousie University in 1962. She took post-graduate courses in business administration from Syracuse University.

Callbeck was a business teacher in New Brunswick and Ontario before returning to the island to enter the family retail business.

== Early political career ==
A Liberal, Callbeck was first elected to the Legislative Assembly of Prince Edward Island in 1974. She was appointed to Cabinet as Minister of Health and Social Services and Minister Responsible for Disabled Persons. She decided not to seek re-election in 1978 in order to work in the family business.

== Member of Parliament ==
Callbeck returned to politics in 1988 when she was elected to the federal House of Commons as an MP for the Liberal Party of Canada. She was the MP for Malpeque during the 34th Canadian Parliament.

During her time in the House of Commons, Callbeck sat on numerous legislative committees, the Standing Committee on Energy, Mines and Resources and the Standing Committee on Consumer and Corporate Affairs and Government Operations.

She held various Critic responsibilities in the national Liberal caucus of Liberal Party Leader John Turner (1988-1989) and Jean Chrétien (1990-1993). Callbeck was Critic for Finance (Financial Institutions), Critic for Consumer and Corporate Affairs (Co-operatives), Assistant Critic for Treasury Board (Privatization and Regulatory Affairs), and Critic for Energy, Mines and Resources.

== Premier of Prince Edward Island ==
In January 1993, Callbeck returned to provincial politics to successfully run for the leadership of the Prince Edward Island Liberal Party and was appointed Premier on 25 January. Under her leadership the Liberals won the 1993 provincial election, making her the first female leader of a political party in Canada to lead her party to victory in a general election while winning her own seat.

Callbeck was premier at the same time as the other three most important public offices in the province were also held by women: Elizabeth II was Sovereign in Prince Edward Island, Marion Reid was the Lieutenant Governor, and Patricia Mella was the Leader of the Official Opposition. In addition, the two most elected senior roles within the Legislative Assembly of Prince Edward Island were held by women during Callbeck's time in office: Nancy Guptill was Speaker of the Legislative Assembly of Prince Edward Island and Elizabeth Hubley as Deputy Speaker.

Callbeck's time in office was marked by significant progress. Spurred by new investments in food processing, manufacturing, aerospace and information technology, the rate of economic growth between 1993 and 1996 was the second highest in Canada. The number of people working in the province reached a record high. The unemployment rate dropped by a whopping seven per cent, the largest reduction of any province in Canada.

Coming into office, the Callbeck government pledged to bring the high budget deficit under control. Under her predecessor, the deficit had risen to an all-time high of $89 million. Through a combination of rising revenues due to the stronger economy, and what a national accounting firm called one of the most aggressive deficit-cutting strategies in the country, the Callbeck government brought in a surplus budget in 1995–96. it was the first budget surplus in a decade.

Reaching a surplus budget, however, did not come without a political cost. Public service salary rollbacks were widely opposed by public service unions - but no jobs were cut.

There were other accomplishments. A new agreement on electricity with New Brunswick resulted in lower electrical costs. A new waste management project put Prince Edward Island as a leader in Canada in reducing the amount of waste going into landfills. In keeping with Callbeck's commitment to strengthen social programs, new investments were made in health and education.

There were significant reforms. Municipal amalgamation reduced duplication and overlap in the province's larger municipalities. The number of government departments, agencies and crown corporations was reduced. A new electoral system replaced the previous 16 dual-member ridings with 27 single-member ridings. It was the first significant electoral reform in more than a century.

Callbeck's time in office saw the beginning of construction of the Confederation Bridge linking Prince Edward Island to New Brunswick. When Callbeck came into office, the project was stalled because of an impasse between federal and provincial officials. She worked closely with the federal public works minister to resolve the issues, and the resulting constitutional change paved the way for the largest capital project in the history of the province.

=== Resignation ===
Callbeck resigned in October 1996 after only three and a half years as PEI's premier. The Liberal party lost the provincial election in November 1996 as well as the next two general elections, only returning to power in the 2007 election.

== Senator ==
On September 22, 1997, Callbeck was appointed to the Senate of Canada by Prime Minister Jean Chrétien.

She sat on numerous Standing Committees and held membership on others. She initiated the motion that led to the Senate's first study on post-secondary education in more than 20 years.

In January 2014, Liberal leader Justin Trudeau announced that all Liberal senators were removed from the national Liberal caucus, and would continue sitting as Independents. The Senators referred to themselves as the Senate Liberal Caucus even though they were no longer members of the parliamentary Liberal caucus. She left the senate at the mandatory retirement age of 75.

== Chancellor ==
On September 29, 2018, Callbeck was appointed as Chancellor of the University of Prince Edward Island (UPEI) by the university's Board of Governors. She is the ninth chancellor in the history of UPEI.

== Awards and recognition ==
Callbeck was named a member of the Order of Canada in 2015 and a member of the Order of PEI in 2017. She holds honorary degrees from Mount Allison University and the University of Prince Edward Island.

== See also ==
- List of female first ministers in Canada
