= Schürmann =

Schürmann is a surname that comes from the Old German language, meaning "one who shears," probably referring to sheep-shearing. Its variations include Schuermann, Schurman and Schuerman.

== Notable people ==
- Anna Maria van Schurman (1607–1678), Dutch painter, engraver, poet, scholar, philosopher and feminist writer
- Clamor Wilhelm Schürmann (1815–1893), Lutheran missionary and linguist in South Australia
- David Schurmann (born 1974), film director
- D. M. Schurman (1924–2013), Canadian naval historian
- Dorothy Schurman Hawes (née Schurman; 1905–1977), American writer
- Georg Caspar Schürmann (c. 1672–1751), German composer
- Jacob Gould Schurman (1854–1942), Canadian-American diplomat and educator
- James T. Schuerman (born 1957), American bishop
- M. F. Schurman (born 1957), Canadian ice hockey player
- Pete Schuermann, American director, producer, editor and cinematographer
- Petra Schürmann (1933–2010), German actress, model, TV announcer and beauty queen
- Pierre-André Schürmann (born 1960), Swiss football manager
- Reiner Schürmann (1941–1993), philosophy academic
- Robert Schurman (1925–1973), Canadian politician
- Sue Schurman, American professor
- Ted Schurmann (1917–2009), Australian writer
- Vilfredo Schürmann (born 1948), Brazilian sailing explorer
- William Schurman (c. 1743–1819), Canadian businessman and politician

== See also ==
- Schuermann, German firm of architects
- Schurman Commission, a committee formed by US President William McKinley
- Schurman Retail Group, American paper products company
- Schuermans
- Scheuer
