= David McKenna (politician) =

Canadian optometrist, businessman and politician

David T. McKenna

MLA for Glen Stewart-Bellevue Cove
- In office 2003–2007
- Preceded by: Pat Mella
- Succeeded by: Cynthia Dunsford

Personal details
- Born: January 24, 1957 Charlottetown
- Died: March 19, 2014 (aged 57) Queenstown, New Zealand
- Party: Progressive Conservative
- Occupation: optometrist

David Terence McKenna (24 January 1957 – 19 March 2014) was a Canadian optometrist, businessman and politician. He represented the electoral district of Glen Stewart-Bellevue Cove in the Legislative Assembly of Prince Edward Island from 2003 to 2007. He was a Progressive Conservative.

A resident of Stratford, Prince Edward Island, McKenna attended the University of Prince Edward Island, and graduated from the optometry program at the University of Waterloo. He owned and operated Family Vision Centre in Charlottetown for 32 years. He entered provincial politics in the 2003 election, winning the Glen Stewart-Bellevue Cove riding. In the 2007 election, he lost to Liberal Cynthia Dunsford by 81 votes in the renamed Stratford-Kinlock riding.

On March 19, 2014, McKenna died in Queenstown, New Zealand, at the age of 57.
