= Lynne Lund =

Canadian politician

Member of the Legislative Assembly of Prince Edward Island for Summerside-Wilmot
- In office April 23, 2019 – March 6, 2023
- Preceded by: Chris Palmer
- Succeeded by: Tyler DesRoches

Deputy Leader of the Green Party of Prince Edward Island
- In office 2015–2023
- Leader: Peter Bevan-Baker

Personal details
- Born: Summerside, Prince Edward Island, Canada
- Party: Green
- Occupation: Businesswoman

Lynne Lund (née Gallant) is a Canadian politician, who was elected to the Legislative Assembly of Prince Edward Island in the 2019 Prince Edward Island general election. She represents the district of Summerside-Wilmot as a member of the Green Party of Prince Edward Island, and serves as the deputy leader of the party.

== Electoral record ==
2023 Prince Edward Island general election: Summerside-Wilmot
Party	Candidate	Votes	%	±%
Progressive Conservative	Tyler DesRoches	1,651	56.7	+24.6
Green	Lynne Lund	981	33.7	-5.3
Liberal	Don Reid	214	7.4	-20.3
New Democratic	Cassie MacKay	45	1.5	+0.3
Island	Eriena O'Reilly	19	0.7	+0.7
Total valid votes		2,910	100.0	
Progressive Conservative gain from Green		Swing		+14.9

2019 Prince Edward Island general election
Party	Candidate	Votes	%	±%
Green	Lynne Lund	1,258	39	+17.1
Progressive Conservative	Tyler Desroches	1,037	32.1	+0.94
Liberal	Chris Palmer	892	27.7	-14.62
New Democratic	Paulette Halupa	39	1.2	-3.43
Total valid votes		2,311	100.00	
Green gain from Liberal		Swing		+17.1

Prince Edward Island provincial by-election, October 17, 2016 Resignation of Janice Sherry
Party	Candidate	Votes	%	±%
Liberal	Chris Palmer	978	42.32	+2.88
Progressive Conservative	Brian Ramsay	720	31.16	-7.24
Green	Lynne Lund	506	21.90	+11.99
New Democratic	Scott Gaudet	107	4.63	-7.64
Total valid votes		2,311	100.00	
Liberal hold		Swing		+5.06

2015 Canadian federal election: Malpeque
Party	Candidate	Votes	%	±%	Expenditures
Liberal	Wayne Easter	13,950	62.08	+19.68	$84,420.76
Conservative	Stephen Stewart	3,947	17.56	–21.54	$40,127.00
New Democratic	Leah-Jane Hayward	2,509	11.17	–3.46	$6,264.15
Green	Lynne Lund	2,066	9.19	+5.32	$12,265.59
Total valid votes/expense limit		22,472	99.55		$170,512.40
Total rejected ballots		102	0.45	+0.01	
Turnout		22,574	79.05	+1.58	
Eligible voters		28,556			
Liberal hold		Swing		+20.61	
Source: Elections Canada
