= Don McDougall =

Don McDougall or McDougal may refer to:

- Donnie McDougall (born 1948), guitarist for The Guess Who
- Don McDougall (director) (1917–1991), American television director
- Donald McDougal, Canadian politician representing Ottawa—Vanier 1908–1911
- Donald MacDougall (1912–2004), British economist
- Don McDougall (baseball) (born 1937), baseball businessman

== See also ==
- Don MacDougall, American sound engineer
