= Henry Callbeck =

Canadian politician (1818–1898)

Henry John Callbeck
- Born: February 25, 1818; Tryon, Prince Edward Island
- Died: January 29, 1898 (aged 79)
- Occupations: Merchant, politician
- Known for: Represented 2nd Queens in the Legislative Assembly of Prince Edward Island

Henry John Callbeck (February 25, 1818 – January 29, 1898) was a Canadian merchant and political figure in Prince Edward Island. He represented 2nd Queens in the Legislative Assembly of Prince Edward Island from 1867 to 1876 as a Liberal member. While in his first term as a legislator, he served as a member of the province's Executive Council from 1867 to 1870.

Callbeck was born in Tryon, Prince Edward Island, the son of Phillip M. Callbeck and the grandson of Phillips Callbeck. He married Charlotte A. Robertson in 1843.

Callbeck operated a general store and built ships at Tryon from 1840 to 1851. He moved to Charlottetown in 1851 and opened a store there, mainly buying and selling wool from sheep raised on the island. He was also an agent for the woolen mills at Tryon, which were later purchased by the Stanfield family. Prior to seeking elective office, Callbeck was treasurer for the city of Charlottetown from 1856 to 1867. After his last term as a legislator ended, Callbeck was High Sheriff for Queens County in 1881 and 1882. He was also a justice of the peace, a governor for Prince of Wales College, and president of the Mutual Fire Insurance Company. He died in Charlottetown at the age of 79.

His brother was the great-great-grandfather of Catherine Callbeck.
