= Summerside-Wilmot =

Provincial electoral district in Prince Edward Island, Canada

Prince Edward Island electoral district
- Coordinates: 46.404°N 63.773°W

Provincial electoral district
- Legislature: Legislative Assembly of Prince Edward Island
MLA
Tyler DesRoches
Progressive Conservative
- District created: 1996
- First contested: 1996
- Last contested: 2023

Demographics
- Census division: Prince County
- Census subdivision: Summerside

Summerside-Wilmot (District 21) is a provincial electoral district for the Legislative Assembly of Prince Edward Island, Canada. It was formerly named Wilmot-Summerside from 1996 to 2007.

== Members ==
The riding has elected the following members of the Legislative Assembly:

Members of the Legislative Assembly for Summerside-Wilmot
Assembly	Years	Member	Party
Riding created from 4th Prince and 5th Prince
60th	1996–2000	Greg Deighan	Progressive Conservative
61st	2000–2003	Greg Deighan	Progressive Conservative
62nd	2003–2007	Greg Deighan	Progressive Conservative
63rd	2007–2011	Janice Sherry	Liberal
64th	2011–2015	Janice Sherry	Liberal
65th	2015–2016	Janice Sherry	Liberal
65th	2016–2019	Chris Palmer	Liberal
66th	2019–2023	Lynne Lund	Green
67th	2023–present	Tyler DesRoches	Progressive Conservative

== Election results ==
=== Summerside-Wilmot, 2007–present ===
2023 Prince Edward Island general election
Party	Candidate	Votes	%	±%
Progressive Conservative	Tyler DesRoches	1,651	56.7	+24.6
Green	Lynne Lund	981	33.7	-5.3
Liberal	Don Reid	214	7.4	-20.3
New Democratic	Cassie MacKay	45	1.5	+0.3
Island	Eriena O'Reilly	19	0.7	+0.7
Total valid votes		2,910	100.0	
Progressive Conservative gain from Green		Swing		+14.9

2019 Prince Edward Island general election
Party	Candidate	Votes	%	±%
Green	Lynne Lund	1,258	39	+17.1
Progressive Conservative	Tyler Desroches	1,037	32.1	+0.94
Liberal	Chris Palmer	892	27.7	-14.62
New Democratic	Paulette Halupa	39	1.2	-3.43
Total valid votes		3226	100.00	
Green gain from Liberal		Swing		+17.1

Prince Edward Island provincial by-election, October 17, 2016 Resignation of Janice Sherry
Party	Candidate	Votes	%	±%
Liberal	Chris Palmer	978	42.32	+2.88
Progressive Conservative	Brian Ramsay	720	31.16	-7.24
Green	Lynne Lund	506	21.90	+11.99
New Democratic	Scott Gaudet	107	4.63	-7.64
Total valid votes		2,311	100.00	
Liberal hold		Swing		+5.06

2015 Prince Edward Island general election
Party	Candidate	Votes	%	±%
Liberal	Janice Sherry	1,135	39.44	-15.79
Progressive Conservative	Brian Ramsay	1,105	38.39	+1.64
New Democratic	Scott Gaudet	353	12.27	
Green	Donald MacFadzen-Reid	285	9.90	+1.88
Total valid votes		2,878	100.0	
Liberal hold		Swing		-8.72

2011 Prince Edward Island general election
Party	Candidate	Votes	%	±%
Liberal	Janice Sherry	1,315	55.23	-1.87
Progressive Conservative	Shirley Anne Cameron	875	36.75	-3.15
Green	Rosalyn Ridlington Abbott	191	8.02	
Total valid votes		2,381	100.0	
Liberal hold		Swing		+0.64

2007 Prince Edward Island general election
Party	Candidate	Votes	%	±%
Liberal	Janice Sherry	1,645	57.10	+16.65
Progressive Conservative	Gerard McCardle	1,063	39.90	-12.23
New Democratic	Ryan Pollard	173	6.00	-1.41
Total valid votes		2,881	100.0	
Liberal gain from Progressive Conservative		Swing		+14.44

==== 2016 electoral reform plebiscite results ====
2016 Prince Edward Island electoral reform referendum
Side	Votes	%
First Past the Post	395	30.45
Mixed Member Proportional	352	27.14
Dual Member Proportional Representation	276	21.28
Preferential Voting	171	13.18
First Past the Post plus leaders	103	7.94
Two-choice preferred result
Mixed Member Proportional	667	53.83
First Past the Post	572	46.17
Total votes cast	1,297	33.20
Registered voters	3,907	
Source "Plebiscite Report" (PDF).

=== Wilmot-Summerside, 1996–2007 ===
2003 Prince Edward Island general election
Party	Candidate	Votes	%	±%
Progressive Conservative	Greg Deighan	1,807	52.13	+1.75
Liberal	Duke Cormier	1,402	40.45	+2.95
New Democratic	Gary Robichaud	257	7.41	-4.72
Total valid votes		3,466	100.0	
Progressive Conservative hold		Swing		-0.60

2000 Prince Edward Island general election
Party	Candidate	Votes	%	±%
Progressive Conservative	Greg Deighan	1,674	50.38	+5.99
Liberal	Paul Schurman	1,246	37.50	-3.59
New Democratic	Gary Robichaud	403	12.13	-2.37
Total valid votes		3,323	100.0	
Progressive Conservative hold		Swing		+4.79

1996 Prince Edward Island general election
Party	Candidate	Votes	%
Progressive Conservative	Greg Deighan	1,506	44.39
Liberal	Walter McEwen	1,394	41.09
New Democratic	Bill McKinnon	492	14.50
Total valid votes		3,392	100.0
This district was created from parts of the dual-member ridings of 4th Prince and 5th Prince.

== See also ==
- List of Prince Edward Island provincial electoral districts
- Canadian provincial electoral districts
