= Schuurman =

Schuurman and Schuurmans are Dutch toponymic surnames meaning "man who sands woodwork". Notable people with the surnames include:

Schuurman

- Adriaan Schuurman (1904–1998), Dutch composer
- Betty Schuurman (b. 1962), Dutch actress
- Birgit Schuurman (b. 1977), Dutch rock singer and actress
- Carol Schuurman (1934–2009), Dutch footballer
- Egbert Schuurman (b. 1937), Dutch philosopher and politician
- Glenn Schuurman (b. 1991), Dutch field hockey player
- Jari Schuurman (b. 1997), Dutch footballer
- Katja Schuurman (b. 1975), Dutch actress and singer
- Marriët Schuurman (b. 1969), Dutch diplomat
- Petra Schuurman (b. 1968), Dutch chess master
- Renée Schuurman (1939–2001), South African tennis player
- Resit Schuurman (b. 1979), Dutch footballer
- Steven Schuurman (born 1975), Dutch technology and media entrepreneur
- Tollien Schuurman (1913–1994), Dutch sprinter
- Wil Schuurman (b. 1943), Dutch politician

Schuurmans

- Daan Schuurmans (b. 1972), Dutch actor
- Jared Schuurmans (b. 1987), American athlete

== See also ==
- Schuerman
- Schurman
