= Stratford-Kinlock =

Former provincial electoral district in Prince Edward Island, Canada

Prince Edward Island electoral district
- Coordinates: 46.207°N 63.103°W

Defunct provincial electoral district
- Legislature: Legislative Assembly of Prince Edward Island
- District created: 1996
- District abolished: 2019
- First contested: 1996
- Last contested: 2015

Demographics
- Population (2011): 8,046
- Electors: approx. 4,000
- Area (km²): 22.48

Stratford-Kinlock was a provincial electoral district for the Legislative Assembly of Prince Edward Island, Canada. It was previously known as Glen Stewart-Bellevue Cove.

== Members ==
Members of the Legislative Assembly for Stratford-Kinlock
| Assembly | Years | Member | Party |
|---|---|---|---|
See 3rd Queens 1873–1996
| 60th | 1996–2000 | Pat Mella | Progressive Conservative |
| 61st | 2000–2003 | Pat Mella | Progressive Conservative |
| 62nd | 2003–2007 | David McKenna | Progressive Conservative |
| 63rd | 2007–2011 | Cynthia Dunsford | Liberal |
| 64th | 2011–2015 | James Aylward | Progressive Conservative |
| 65th | 2015–2019 | James Aylward | Progressive Conservative |

== Election results ==
=== Stratford-Kinlock, 2007–2019 ===
2015 Prince Edward Island general election
| Party | Candidate | Votes | % | ±% |
|---|---|---|---|---|
| Progressive Conservative | James Aylward | 2,155 | 50.26 | -5.33 |
| Liberal | David Dunphy | 1,453 | 33.89 | -0.26 |
| New Democratic | Chris van Ouwerkerk | 350 | 8.16 | +2.52 |
| Green | Samantha Saunders | 330 | 7.70 | +3.08 |
| Total valid votes | | 4,288 | 100.0 | |
| Progressive Conservative hold | | Swing | | -2.54 |

2011 Prince Edward Island general election
| Party | Candidate | Votes | % | ±% |
|---|---|---|---|---|
| Progressive Conservative | James Aylward | 2,020 | 55.59 | +9.65 |
| Liberal | Cynthia Dunsford | 1,241 | 34.15 | -14.11 |
| New Democratic | Chris van Ouwerkerk | 205 | 5.64 | +3.55 |
| Green | Donald Killorn | 168 | 4.62 | +0.92 |
| Total valid votes | | 3,634 | 100.0 | |
| Progressive Conservative gain from Liberal | | Swing | | +11.88 |

2007 Prince Edward Island general election
| Party | Candidate | Votes | % | ±% |
|---|---|---|---|---|
| Liberal | Cynthia Dunsford | 1,682 | 48.26 | +14.13 |
| Progressive Conservative | David McKenna | 1,601 | 45.94 | -16.18 |
| Green | Mark Wellman | 129 | 3.70 | |
| New Democratic | Jane McNeil | 73 | 2.09 | -1.66 |
| Total valid votes | | 3,485 | 100.0 | |
| Liberal gain from Progressive Conservative | | Swing | | +15.16 |

==== 2016 electoral reform plebiscite results ====
2016 Prince Edward Island electoral reform referendum
| Side | Votes | % |
|---|---|---|
| Mixed Member Proportional | 789 | 33.73 |
| First Past the Post | 608 | 25.99 |
| Dual Member Proportional Representation | 491 | 20.99 |
| Preferential Voting | 234 | 10.00 |
| First Past the Post plus leaders | 217 | 9.28 |
Two-choice preferred result
| Mixed Member Proportional | 1,314 | 59.46 |
| First Past the Post | 896 | 40.54 |
| Total votes cast | 2,339 | 42.64 |
| Registered voters | 5,486 | |
Source "Plebiscite Report" (PDF).

=== Glen Stewart-Bellevue Cove, 1996–2007 ===
2003 Prince Edward Island general election
| Party | Candidate | Votes | % | ±% |
|---|---|---|---|---|
| Progressive Conservative | David McKenna | 2,350 | 62.12 | -6.42 |
| Liberal | Eric Ellsworth | 1,291 | 34.13 | +9.79 |
| New Democratic | Jane MacNeil | 142 | 3.75 | -3.36 |
| Total valid votes | | 3,783 | 100.0 | |
| Progressive Conservative hold | | Swing | | -8.10 |

2000 Prince Edward Island general election
| Party | Candidate | Votes | % | ±% |
|---|---|---|---|---|
| Progressive Conservative | Pat Janet Mella | 2,399 | 68.54 | -0.44 |
| Liberal | Viola Evans-Murley | 852 | 24.34 | -2.41 |
| New Democratic | Jane NacNeil [sic] | 249 | 7.11 | +2.84 |
| Total valid votes | | 3,500 | 100.0 | |
| Progressive Conservative hold | | Swing | | +0.98 |

1996 Prince Edward Island general election
| Party | Candidate | Votes | % |
|---|---|---|---|
| Progressive Conservative | Pat Janet Mella | 2,357 | 68.98 |
| Liberal | Mary Hughes | 914 | 26.75 |
| New Democratic | Pat Burgoyne | 146 | 4.27 |
| Total valid votes | | 3,417 | 100.0 |
This district was created from parts of the dual-member riding of 3rd Queens.

== See also ==
- List of Prince Edward Island provincial electoral districts
- Canadian provincial electoral districts
