= John R. Calhoun =

Canadian politician

John R. Calhoun was a merchant and political figure on Prince Edward Island. He represented 4th Prince in the Legislative Assembly of Prince Edward Island from 1876 to 1879 as a Liberal.

Born in New Brunswick, Calhoun spent most of his life in Summerside. He owned a general store and operated a sawmill and warehouse there. Calhoun was a member of the town board for Summerside from 1875 to 1877.
