= O'Leary-Inverness =

Provincial electoral district in Prince Edward Island, Canada

Coordinates: 46.680°N 64.226°W

Prince Edward Island electoral district

Provincial electoral district
- Legislature: Legislative Assembly of Prince Edward Island
MLA
Robert Henderson
Liberal
- District created: 1996
- First contested: 1996
- Last contested: 2023

O'Leary-Inverness (District 25) is a provincial electoral district for the Legislative Assembly of Prince Edward Island, Canada. It was formerly known as West Point-Bloomfield from 1996 to 2007. It was created in 1996 from parts of 1st Prince and 2nd Prince. It is notable for being the first district on the Island to ever elect a member of a third party to the legislature.

== Members ==
The riding has elected the following members of the Legislative Assembly:

Members of the Legislative Assembly for O'Leary-Inverness
Assembly	Years	Member	Party
See 1st Prince and 2nd Prince 1873–1996
60th	1996–2000	Herb Dickieson	New Democratic
61st	2000–2003	Eva Rodgerson	Progressive Conservative
62nd	2003–2007	Eva Rodgerson	Progressive Conservative
63rd	2007–2011	Robert Henderson	Liberal
64th	2011–2015	Robert Henderson	Liberal
65th	2015–2019	Robert Henderson	Liberal
66th	2019–2023	Robert Henderson	Liberal
67th	2023–present	Robert Henderson	Liberal

== Election results ==
=== O'Leary-Inverness, 2007–present ===
2023 Prince Edward Island general election
Party	Candidate	Votes	%	±%
Liberal	Robert Henderson	894	37.2	-3.8
Progressive Conservative	Daniel MacDonald	738	30.7	+13.5
New Democratic	Herb Dickieson	702	29.2	-4.2
Green	Richard Lush	72	3.0	-5.6
Total valid votes		2,406	100.0	
Liberal hold		Swing		-0.5

2019 Prince Edward Island general election
Party	Candidate	Votes	%	±%
Liberal	Robert Henderson	1,102	40.90	-7.91
New Democratic	Herb Dickieson	898	33.35	+21.60
Progressive Conservative	Barb Broome	462	17.16	-22.41
Green	Jason Charette	231	8.58	New
Total valid votes		2,693	100.00	
Liberal hold		Swing		

2015 Prince Edward Island general election
Party	Candidate	Votes	%	±%
Liberal	Robert Henderson	1,310	48.81	-6.69
Progressive Conservative	Daniel MacDonald	1,063	39.61	-4.88
New Democratic	Billy MacKendrick	311	11.59	
Total valid votes		2,684	100.0	
Liberal hold		Swing		-0.90

2011 Prince Edward Island general election
Party	Candidate	Votes	%	±%
Liberal	Robert Henderson	1,431	55.50	-6.63
Progressive Conservative	Daniel MacDonald	1,147	44.49	+6.62
Total valid votes		2,578	100.0	
Liberal hold		Swing		-6.62

2007 Prince Edward Island general election
Party	Candidate	Votes	%	±%
Liberal	Robert Henderson	1,731	62.13	+24.17
Progressive Conservative	Eva Rodgerson	1,055	37.87	-14.07
Total valid votes		2,786	100.0	
Liberal gain from Progressive Conservative		Swing		+19.12

=== 2016 electoral reform plebiscite results ===
2016 Prince Edward Island electoral reform referendum
Side	Votes	%
First Past the Post	426	47.76
Mixed Member Proportional	155	17.38
Dual Member Proportional Representation	152	17.04
Preferential Voting	88	9.87
First Past the Post plus leaders	71	7.96
Final round preferred result
First Past the Post	498	56.98
Mixed Member Proportional	204	23.34
Dual Member Proportional Representation	172	19.68
Total votes cast	892	26.56
Registered voters	3,359	
Source "Plebiscite Report" (PDF). Archived from the original (PDF) on 1 December 2017.

=== West Point-Bloomfield, 1996–2007 ===
2003 Prince Edward Island general election
Party	Candidate	Votes	%	±%
Progressive Conservative	Eva Rodgerson	1,193	51.94	+11.24
Liberal	Sean O'Halloran	872	37.96	+16.18
New Democratic	Ed Kilfoil	232	10.10	-27.41
Total valid votes		2,297	100.0	
Progressive Conservative hold		Swing		-2.47

2000 Prince Edward Island general election
Party	Candidate	Votes	%	±%
Progressive Conservative	Eva Rodgerson	753	40.70	+11.73
New Democratic	Herb Dickieson	694	37.51	-0.88
Liberal	Charles Adams	403	21.78	-10.86
Total valid votes		1,850	100.0	
Progressive Conservative gain from New Democratic		Swing		+6.30

1996 Prince Edward Island general election
Party	Candidate	Votes	%
New Democratic	Herb Dickieson	921	38.39
Liberal	Fairley Yeo	783	32.64
Progressive Conservative	Gary Morgan	695	28.97
Total valid votes		2,399	100.0
This district was created from parts of the dual-member ridings of 1st Prince and 2nd Prince.

== See also ==
- List of Prince Edward Island provincial electoral districts
- Canadian provincial electoral districts
