= Jeannie Lea =

Canadian politician (born 1950)

MLA for 6th Queens
- In office 1993–1996
- Preceded by: Joe Ghiz
- Succeeded by: riding dissolved

Personal details
- Born: October 16, 1950 (age 75) Moncton, New Brunswick
- Party: Liberal
- Occupation: civil servant, teacher

Sarah Jean "Jeannie" Lea is a former Canadian politician.

She was elected to the Legislative Assembly of Prince Edward Island in the 1993 provincial election. She represented the electoral district of 6th Queens and was a member of the Liberal Party.

She was born Sarah Jean Robidoux, the daughter of Maurice D. Robidoux and Dorther E. Fraser, and was educated in Moncton, at Mount Allison University, and at Holland College. She worked as a substitute teacher in Charlottetown and also as a craftsperson. She has served as a member of the Unit Three school board and was also president of the Prince Edward Island Spinners and Weavers Guild. Lea was president of the Heart and Stroke Foundation of PEI and a director of the Heart and Stroke Foundation of Canada.

She served only a single term in office and resigned a few months before the 1996 election. Lea was a member of the province's Executive Council, serving as a minister without portfolio, Minister Responsible for Government Reform and the Status of Women and Minister Responsible for Higher Education, Adult Training and Literacy. Since her retirement from office, she has been actively involved in the electoral reform movement in Canada and has been promoting the involvement of women in politics.

She is married to James Lea, the grandson of Walter Maxfield Lea, who was Premier of Prince Edward Island from 1930 to 1936.
