= Wayne Carew =

Canadian businessman

Wayne Carew is a Canadian businessman and former politician in the province of Prince Edward Island.

A resident of Stanley Bridge, Carew was elected by acclamation as leader of the Prince Edward Island Liberal Party, then the Official Opposition in the Legislative Assembly of Prince Edward Island, in 1999 following the resignation of Keith Milligan.

Carew ran for a seat in the legislature in the 2000 general election but was not successful.

Carew resigned from leadership of the party following the 2000 election and was replaced by Ron MacKinley on an interim basis.

Carew a former retired General Motors and Ford Canada car dealer is currently the president of Confederation M&A (formerly MRSB Mergers & Acquisitions).

Carew has been awarded the Queen Elizabeth 11 Diamond Jubilee Medal, the King Charles 111 Coronation Medal and the Senate of Canada Volunteer Medal for his Volunteer activities.

Awarded an Honorary Doctorate Degree from UPEI and inducted to the PEI Business Hall Of Fame in 2025.
