= Eva Rodgerson =

Canadian politician (born 1945)

MLA for West Point-Bloomfield
- In office April 17, 2000 – May 28, 2007
- Preceded by: Herb Dickieson
- Succeeded by: Robert Henderson

Personal details
- Born: June 21, 1945 (age 80) O'Leary, Prince Edward Island
- Party: Progressive Conservative

Eva Elizabeth Rodgerson (born June 21, 1945) is a Canadian politician, who was a member of the Legislative Assembly of Prince Edward Island from 2000 to 2007. She represented the electoral district of West Point-Bloomfield and was a member of the Progressive Conservative Party.

She was born Eva Elizabeth MacMillan in O'Leary, Prince Edward Island, the daughter of Hamel MacMillan and Helen Gay, and was educated at Holland College. She married Gordon Rodgerson in 1963. Rodgerson was a community development officer and was involved in the construction of the "Big Potato" in O'Leary. In 2008, she was awarded the Governor General's Caring Canadian Award for over thirty-five years of service to the community of O'Leary.
