= Roger Soloman =

Canadian politician and educator (1939–2021)

Member of the Legislative Assembly of Prince Edward Island
- In office 1993–1996
- Preceded by: Albert Fogarty
- Succeeded by: District abolished
- Constituency: 1st Kings

Personal details
- Born: Roger Allan Francis Soloman; May 16, 1939 Georgetown, Prince Edward Island, Canada
- Died: April 14, 2021 (aged 81) Charlottetown, Prince Edward Island, Canada
- Party: Prince Edward Island Liberal Party
- Spouse: Sheila Graham (m. 1965)
- Children: 4
- Education: Saint Dunstan's University (BSc); University of Prince Edward Island (BEd); University of New Brunswick; Saint Francis Xavier University (MEd)
- Occupation: educator, politician

Roger Allan Francis Soloman (May 16, 1939 – April 14, 2021) was a Canadian provincial politician and educator on Prince Edward Island. He served as member of the Legislative Assembly of Prince Edward Island (MLA) from 1993 to 1996, representing 1st Kings and sitting with the Prince Edward Island Liberal Party.

== Early life ==
Soloman was born in Georgetown, Prince Edward Island, on May 16, 1939. He was one of seven children of Walter Soloman and Lucy (Scully). Soloman first studied at Saint Dunstan's University, graduating with a Bachelor of Science in 1963, before earning a Bachelor of Education from the University of Prince Edward Island eight years later. He subsequently undertook postgraduate studies at the University of New Brunswick and Saint Francis Xavier University, obtaining a Master of Education from the latter institution in 1977.

Soloman went on to serve as a lieutenant in the Royal Canadian Navy on HMCS Bonaventure. His crew were part of the United Nations peacekeeping force in Cyprus from 1963 until 1964. After his stint in the navy, he worked as an educator for over 30 years at Souris Consolidated and Souris Regional School, first as a math and science teacher and then as a principal.

== Political career ==
Soloman entered politics in 1993, running in the provincial election that year. He was elected to the Legislative Assembly, representing the riding of 1st Kings. He served on various legislative committees, most notably as chair of the Special Committee on Proposed Tax Harmonization during his final year in the legislature.

Soloman chose not to run in the 1996 election. Instead, he acted as campaign chair for Premier Keith Milligan. He also served in that capacity for Lawrence MacAulay, the federal Member of Parliament for Cardigan.

== Later life ==
After retiring from politics, Soloman went into the cottage business, in order to be closer to his family. He oversaw De Roma Cottages on the Brudenell River. He resided in Stratford with his wife during his later years.

== Personal life ==
Soloman married Sheila Graham on December 27, 1965. Together, they had four children: Paulette, Terry, Kimberly, and Frank. He was a Roman Catholic.

Soloman died on April 14, 2021, at the Queen Elizabeth Hospital in Charlottetown. He was 81 years old.
