= Augustus Holland =

Canadian politician

Augustus Edward Crevier Holland (March 26, 1824 – 1919) was a farmer and political figure in Prince Edward Island. He represented 4th Prince in the Legislative Assembly of Prince Edward Island from 1873 to 1876 and from 1879 to 1886 as a Conservative member.

He was born in Tryon, Prince Edward Island, the son of Frederick B. Holland and Elizabeth Grathay, and the grandson of Samuel Holland. Holland led a volunteer rifle company and served on the Board of Works.

Holland seconded the motion put forward by Cornelius Howatt in 1873 opposing the entry of Prince Edward Island into the Dominion of Canada. He was married three times: to Mary Conroy, the widow of Doctor James H. Conroy, in 1858, then to Emma Parker in 1879 and finally to Annie Page in 1898.
