= Tryon, Prince Edward Island =

Tryon
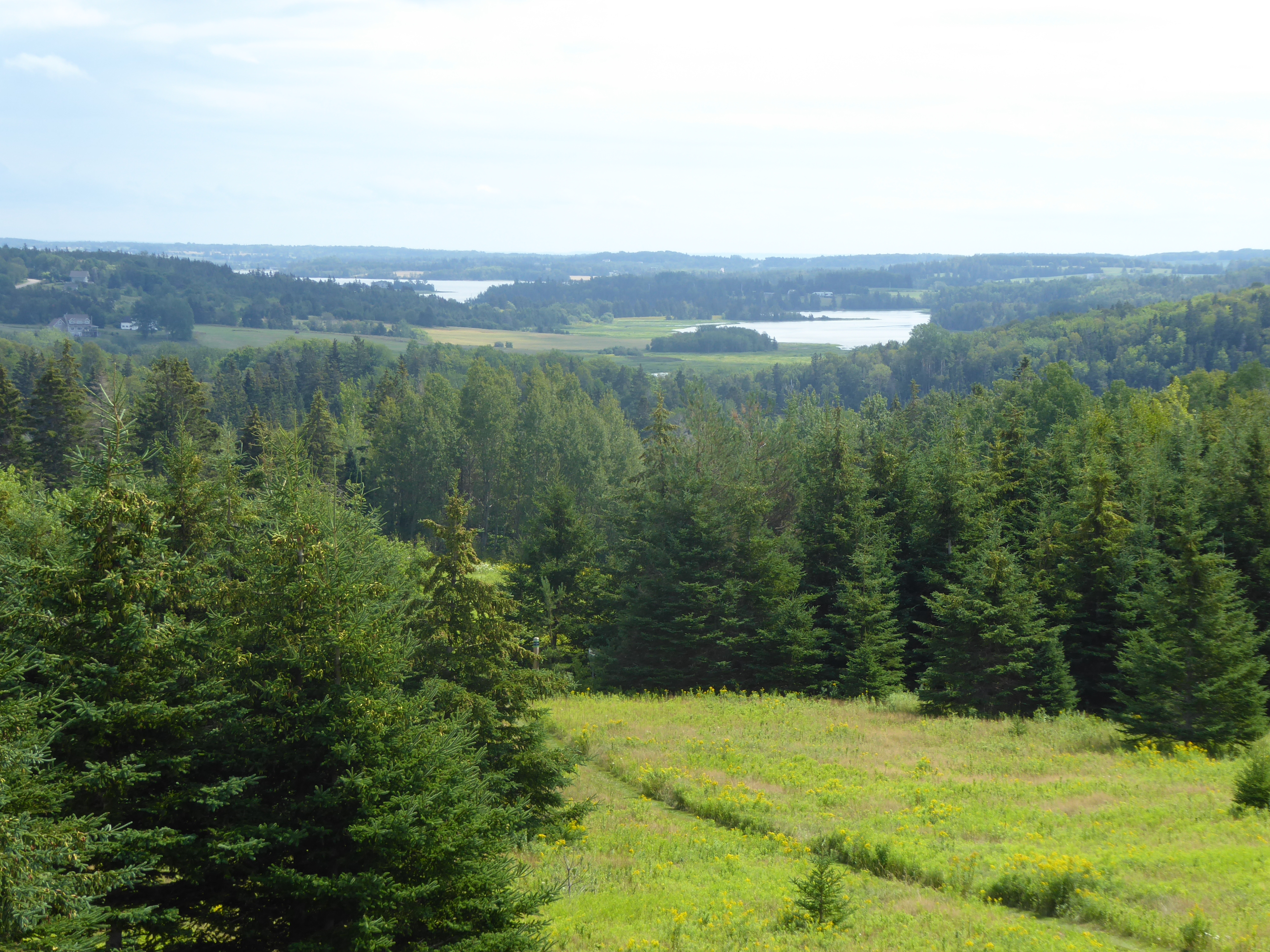
- Landscape at Tryon

- Location of Tryon in Prince Edward Island Tryon (Canada)
- Coordinates: 46°14′10.18″N 63°32′58.06″W
- Country: Canada
- Province: Prince Edward Island
- County: Prince County

Tryon is an unincorporated area in Prince County, Prince Edward Island, Canada. Situated on Route 1 and Route 10, it lies within the township of Lot 28 which in 2006 had a population of 880 people. Tryon is not far from Crapaud, Prince Edward Island.

The area is mostly rural. In 1856, Charles E. Stanfield and his brother-in-law Samuel Dawson founded Tryon Woollen Mills in Tryon. Charles sold his interest to Samuel a decade later and moved to Truro, Nova Scotia where he founded the well-known Stanfields Underwear, which still operates.

Tryon was named after William Tryon (1729-1788) an American colonial governor who also served in Canada. There are two churches: one Baptist, and one United. Both are noted architectural works by William Critchlow Harris. The Tryon United Church was designated a National Historic Site of Canada in 1990. In 2006 it was renamed South Shore United Church after the amalgamation of four area congregations (Bonshaw, Hampton, Tryon and Victoria).

The Tryon & Area Historical Society Inc. was officially incorporated on Feb. 28, 2008 with the purpose of collecting, preserving, and promoting the rich history of the community.

The local Tryon River Watershed Co-operative is active in preserving and enhancing the Tryon River.

== Notable people ==
- Morley Bell, lawyer and political figure
- Henry Callbeck, merchant and political figure
- Augustus Holland, farmer and political figure
- Cornelius Howatt, farmer and political figure
- William C. Lea, farmer and political figure
- His son, Walter Lea, 17th Premier of Prince Edward Island
- William Schurman, businessman and politician

== See also ==
- Abegweit Passage
- Cape Tryon Light
