= Herb Dickieson =

Canadian politician

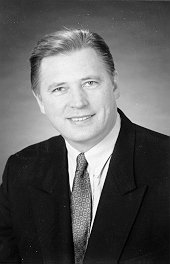

Leader of the New Democratic Party of Prince Edward Island
- In office 1995–2002
- Preceded by: Larry Duchesne
- Succeeded by: Gary Robichaud

MLA for West Point-Bloomfield
- In office 1996–2000
- Preceded by: Riding created
- Succeeded by: Eva Rodgerson

President of the New Democratic Party of Prince Edward Island
- In office November 12, 2023 – October 25, 2025

Personal details
- Born: March 8, 1954 (age 72) New Glasgow, Prince Edward Island
- Party: New Democratic
- Occupation: Physician

Herb Dickieson (born March 8, 1954) is a retired physician and a former educator and politician in Prince Edward Island, Canada. Dickieson was the first and, to date, only member of the New Democratic Party of Prince Edward Island to have sat in the Legislative Assembly.

Dickieson was raised in New Glasgow on a small family farm. He graduated from the University of Prince Edward Island with his B.Sc. in 1979 and received a B.Ed. in 1982. Dickieson taught high school in Calgary, Alberta for one year before entering medical school at Dalhousie University, from which he graduated with his medical degree in 1987. Dickieson interned in New Brunswick and in Prince Edward Island and established a family medicine practise in O'Leary.

Dickieson was elected leader of the Island New Democrats in March 1995, and led the party in the 1996 and 2000 provincial elections, seeking to be a Member of the Legislature for District 25, West Point-Bloomfield. He was successful in the 1996 election, but was defeated in the 2000 election. Dickieson led the party through the 1990s, but resigned two years after his personal electoral defeat.

Dickieson was a popular politician during his term, even among non-New Democrats, as a voice for change. He was encouraged by many members to run for the federal New Democratic Party in the 2004 federal election and again provincially, he had refused until he announced on September 12, 2014 that he would seek the NDP nomination for Egmont for the 2015 federal election. Dickieson was nominated as the candidate in October 2014. On October 19, 2015, Dickieson was defeated in the election, finishing third behind the winner, Liberal Bobby Morrissey and Conservative incumbent Gail Shea.

Dickieson was involved in local and provincial issues, including concern over the closing of rural post offices, the fate of farmers, and the quality of education, particularly among children. He has served on boards for the promotion of a community youth centre, Chamber of Commerce board of directors, and as Chief of Medical Staff at the Community Hospital in O'Leary. He is also a Past President of the Medical Society of Prince Edward Island.

He resides with his wife Kathleen and family in Howlan.

He was elected President of the PEI NDP on November 12, 2023. He served in the role until October 25, 2025.

On December 16, 2025, Dickieson announced his bid for the leadership of the New Democratic Party of Prince Edward Island. He withdrew from the race on January 20, 2026.

== Electoral record ==
2023 Prince Edward Island general election: O'Leary-Inverness
Party	Candidate	Votes	%	±%
Liberal	Robert Henderson	894	37.2	-3.8
Progressive Conservative	Daniel MacDonald	738	30.7	+13.5
New Democratic	Herb Dickieson	702	29.2	-4.2
Green	Richard Lush	72	3.0	-5.6
Total valid votes		2,406	100.0	
Liberal hold		Swing		-0.5

2019 Prince Edward Island general election: O'Leary-Inverness
Party	Candidate	Votes	%	±%
Liberal	Robert Henderson	1,102	40.90	-7.91
New Democratic	Herb Dickieson	898	33.35	+21.60
Progressive Conservative	Barb Broome	462	17.16	-22.41
Green	Jason Charette	231	8.58	New
Total valid votes		2,693	100.00	
Liberal hold		Swing		

2015 Canadian federal election: Egmont
Party	Candidate	Votes	%	±%	Expenditures
Liberal	Bobby Morrissey	10,521	49.25	+17.94	$67,240.83
Conservative	Gail Shea	6,185	28.95	–25.70	$110,058.32
New Democratic	Herb Dickieson	4,097	19.18	+6.81	$34,718.49
Green	Nils Ling	559	2.62	+0.95	$4,895.27
Total valid votes/expense limit		21,362	99.59		$169,928.60
Total rejected ballots		87	0.41	–0.39	
Turnout		21,449	77.29	+5.62	
Eligible voters		27,751			
Liberal gain from Conservative		Swing		+21.82	
Source: Elections Canada

2000 Prince Edward Island general election: West Point-Bloomfield
Party	Candidate	Votes	%	±%
Progressive Conservative	Eva Rodgerson	753	40.70	+11.73
New Democratic	Herb Dickieson	694	37.51	-0.88
Liberal	Charles Adams	403	21.78	-10.86
Total valid votes		1,850	100.0	
Progressive Conservative gain from New Democratic		Swing		+6.30

1996 Prince Edward Island general election: West Point-Bloomfield
Party	Candidate	Votes	%
New Democratic	Herb Dickieson	921	38.39
Liberal	Fairley Yeo	783	32.64
Progressive Conservative	Gary Morgan	695	28.97
Total valid votes		2,399	100.0
This district was created from parts of the dual-member ridings of 1st Prince and 2nd Prince.
