= William G. Strong =

William Gambee Strong (June 21, 1819 – after 1881) was a merchant and political figure in Prince Edward Island. He served as a member of the Legislative Council of Prince Edward Island for eight years.

He was born in Sackville, New Brunswick, the son of the reverend John B. Strong and Elizabeth Gambee. Strong was educated in Saint John, New Brunswick and at a boarding school in Annapolis, Nova Scotia. In 1842, he married Sarah Jane Bonsfield. Strong worked as a clerk for a merchant in Saint John before moving to Bedeque, Prince Edward Island in 1851, where he was a merchant and shipbuilder. In 1877, he settled in Summerside. He served as a member of the province's Executive Council from 1873 until 1881, when he was named sheriff for Prince County.

Strong was also a lay preacher in the Methodist Church.

His grandsons Heath and Ernest served in the Prince Edward Island assembly.
