= Cornelius Howatt =

Canadian politician

Cornelius Howatt (February 4, 1810 – May 7, 1895) was a farmer and political figure in Prince Edward Island. He represented 4th Prince in the Legislative Assembly of Prince Edward Island from 1859 to 1876 as a Conservative member.

He was born in Tryon, Prince Edward Island, the son of James Howatt. He married Jane Bell around 1840. Howatt was speaker for the provincial assembly from 1874 to 1876.

With Augustus Holland, he supported a motion opposing union with Canada in 1873 even though, by that time, union was considered by most as inevitable. He died at North St. Eleanors in 1895.

His daughter Helen married John Howatt Bell.
