= James Aylward (politician) =

Canadian politician (born 1964)

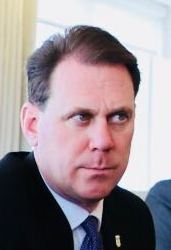
- Aylward in 2019

Member of the Legislative Assembly of Prince Edward Island for Stratford-Kinlock
- In office October 18, 2011 – March 26, 2019
- Preceded by: Cynthia Dunsford
- Succeeded by: Riding dissolved

Member of the Legislative Assembly of Prince Edward Island for Stratford-Keppoch
- In office April 23, 2019 – March 6, 2023
- Preceded by: Riding established
- Succeeded by: Jill Burridge

Leader of the Progressive Conservative Party of Prince Edward Island
- In office October 20, 2017 – February 9, 2019
- Preceded by: Jamie Fox (interim)
- Succeeded by: Dennis King

Leader of the Opposition in Prince Edward Island
- In office October 20, 2017 – April 23, 2019
- Preceded by: Jamie Fox
- Succeeded by: Peter Bevan-Baker

Personal details
- Born: January 12, 1964 (age 62)
- Party: Conservative; Progressive Conservative

James Aylward (born January 12, 1964) is a Canadian politician affiliated with the Prince Edward Island Progressive Conservative Party. His political career began with his election to the Legislative Assembly of Prince Edward Island in the 2011 provincial election, representing the district of Stratford-Keppoch.

Prior to this leadership role, Aylward campaigned for the party’s leadership in December 2014 but was narrowly defeated by Rob Lantz on the second ballot during the leadership convention held on February 28, 2015.

Aylward served as the Leader of the Opposition and leader of the Prince Edward Island Progressive Conservative Party from October 2017 until February 2019 after defeating MLA, Brad Trivers.

On September 17, 2018, Aylward announced his resignation as the Leader of the Prince Edward Island Progressive Conservative Party. He stated that "It has become clear to me over the past couple of months that despite my best efforts, I have not been able to make a strong enough connection with Islanders."

On May 9, 2024, Aylward announced he was seeking the nomination for the Conservative Party of Canada for Cardigan. He would be defeated in the 2025 Canadian federal election by Liberal Kent MacDonald.

== Parliamentary roles ==
- Opposition House Leader (2015–2016): As the Opposition House Leader, Aylward was responsible for coordinating the opposition’s activities in the legislature, such as debating bills and review government policies.
- Leader of the Official Opposition (2017–2018): In this role, Aylward led the main opposition party, challenging the government’s agenda and offering alternative policies.
- Minister of Health & Wellness (2019–2021): As the Minister of Health & Wellness, he administered the public health and healthcare systems and promoting wellness
- Minister of Transportation & Infrastructure (2021–2023): Aylward would was in charge of the development and maintenance of the region’s transportation systems and infrastructure projects.

== Electoral record ==
2025 Canadian federal election: Cardigan
Party	Candidate	Votes	%	±%	Expenditures
Liberal	Kent MacDonald	14,404	57.02	+6.45	
Conservative	James Aylward	9,442	37.38	+6.47	
New Democratic	Lynne Thiele	505	2.00	−7.77	
Independent	Wayne Phelan	404	1.60		
Green	Maria Rodriguez	326	1.29	−3.52	
People's	Adam Harding	180	0.71	−2.57	
Total valid votes/expense limit		25,261	99.09		
Total rejected ballots		233	0.91		
Turnout		25,494	79.55		
Eligible voters		32,048			
Liberal notional hold		Swing		−0.01	
Source: Elections Canada
Note: number of eligible voters does not include voting day registrations.

2019 Prince Edward Island general election: Stratford-Keppoch
Party	Candidate	Votes	%	±%	Expenditures
Progressive Conservative	James Aylward	1,270	42.5	-7.8	$5,903.30
Liberal	David Dunphy	882	29.5	-4.4	8,888.76
Green	Devon Strang	805	26.9	+21.0	3,436.51
New Democratic	Lynne Thiele	31	1.0	-8.1	none listed
Total valid votes/expense limit		2,988	99.83		$10,111.92
Total rejected ballots		5	0.17		
Turnout		2,993	80.80		
Eligible voters		3,704			
Progressive Conservative hold		Swing		-7.8	
Source: Elections Prince Edward Island
