= John Elliot Williams =

Canadian politician

MLA (Councillor) for 4th Kings
- In office 1978–1979
- Preceded by: Gilbert Clements
- Succeeded by: Gilbert Clements

Personal details
- Born: September 5, 1920 Beach Point, Prince Edward Island
- Died: June 4, 1988 (aged 67) Charlottetown, Prince Edward Island
- Party: Progressive Conservative

John Elliot Williams (September 5, 1920 – June 4, 1988) was a Canadian politician and boat builder. He represented 4th Kings in the Legislative Assembly of Prince Edward Island from 1978 to 1979 as a Progressive Conservative.

Williams was born in 1920 in Beach Point, Prince Edward Island. He married Annie Giddings in 1940. Williams enlisted in the Royal Canadian Navy during the Second World War, to work as a shipwright. Following the war, he returned to Beach Point, and worked various jobs as a fisherman and carpenter before starting a career as a boat builder in the 1950s.

Williams entered provincial politics in the 1978 election, defeating Liberal incumbent Gilbert Clements by 24 votes to become councillor for the electoral district of 4th Kings. Williams was defeated by Clements when he ran for re-election in 1979.

Following his term as MLA, Williams continued his career as a boat builder and died at Queen Elizabeth Hospital in Charlottetown in June 1988.
