= Chris Palmer (Prince Edward Island politician) =

Canadian politician

Member of the Legislative Assembly of Prince Edward Island for Summerside-Wilmot
- In office October 17, 2016 – March 26, 2019
- Preceded by: Janice Sherry
- Succeeded by: Lynne Lund

Personal details
- Born: October 4, 1968 (age 57) Summerside
- Party: Prince Edward Island Liberal Party

Chris Palmer (born 4 October 1968) is a Canadian politician, who was elected to the Legislative Assembly of Prince Edward Island in a by-election on October 17, 2016. He represented the electoral district of Summerside-Wilmot as a member of the Prince Edward Island Liberal Party until his defeat in the 2019 Prince Edward Island general election.

== Biography ==
On January 10, 2018, Palmer was appointed to the Executive Council of Prince Edward Island as Minister of Economic Development and Tourism.

Prior to his election to the legislature, Palmer was a business owner in Summerside, including as a property developer and owner of a pottery business.

== Electoral record ==
2019 Prince Edward Island general election
Party	Candidate	Votes	%	±%
Green	Lynne Lund	1258	39	+17.1
Progressive Conservative	Tyler Desroches	1037	32.1	+0.94
Liberal	Chris Palmer	892	27.7	-14.62
New Democratic	Paulette Halupa	39	1.2	-3.43
Total valid votes		2,311	100.00	
Green gain from Liberal		Swing		+17.1

Prince Edward Island provincial by-election, October 17, 2016 Resignation of Janice Sherry
Party	Candidate	Votes	%	±%
Liberal	Chris Palmer	978	42.32	+2.88
Progressive Conservative	Brian Ramsay	720	31.16	-7.24
Green	Lynne Lund	506	21.90	+11.99
New Democratic	Scott Gaudet	107	4.63	-7.64
Total valid votes		2,311	100.00	
Liberal hold		Swing		+5.06
