= Ernest Strong =

Canadian politician

Ernest Henry Strong (September 26, 1886 – August 7, 1961) was a lawyer, judge and political figure on Prince Edward Island. He represented 5th Prince in the Legislative Assembly of Prince Edward Island from 1944 to 1945 as a Conservative.

He was born in Crapaud, Prince Edward Island, the son of C. Edward Strong and Sarah Davis Ellison, and the grandson of William G. Strong. He was educated at Prince of Wales College. Strong was called to the bar in 1912. He served overseas during World War I receiving the military cross in the battle of Amiens in 1917. He retired from the military in 1939 at the rank of lieutenant-colonel. Strong was married twice: first to Loretta McNeill and then, in 1931, to Clara Wilkinson, They had two children Edward Strong and Elizabeth Reagh (née Strong) . He resigned his seat in the assembly in 1945 to run unsuccessfully for a seat in the House of Commons. Strong ran unsuccessfully for re-election to Prince Edward Island assembly in 1947, 1951, 1955 and 1957. He was stipendiary magistrate at Summerside from 1931 to 1958 and also served as deputy judge in juvenile court at Summerside. Strong died in Summerside at the age of 74.

His brother Heath also served in the province's assembly.
