= Schuermans =

Schuermans is a surname. Notable people with the surname include:

- Alfred Schuermans (1897–1978), Belgian painter
- Jens Schuermans (born 1993), Belgian mountain cyclist
- Kenneth Schuermans (born 1991), Belgian footballer

== See also ==
- James T. Schuerman (born 1956), American Roman Catholic bishop
