= Heath Strong =

Canadian politician

Heath Edward Strong, KC (August 21, 1882 – November 16, 1950) was a lawyer and political figure in Prince Edward Island. He represented 4th Prince in the Legislative Assembly of Prince Edward Island from 1932 to 1935 and from 1944 to 1945 as a Conservative.

Heath Edward Strong was born in Summerside, Prince Edward Island, was the son of C. Edward Strong and Sarah Jane Bousfield, and the grandson of William G. Strong. He was educated there and at Prince of Wales College. Strong was called to the bar in 1907. He was named King's Counsel in 1924. In 1927, he married Ethel Louise Sinclair. He was speaker for the assembly from 1934 to 1935. Strong resigned his seat in the provincial assembly in 1945 to run unsuccessfully for a seat in the House of Commons. He died in Summerside at the age of 68.

His brother Ernest also served in the provincial assembly.
