= Cynthia Dunsford =

Canadian politician

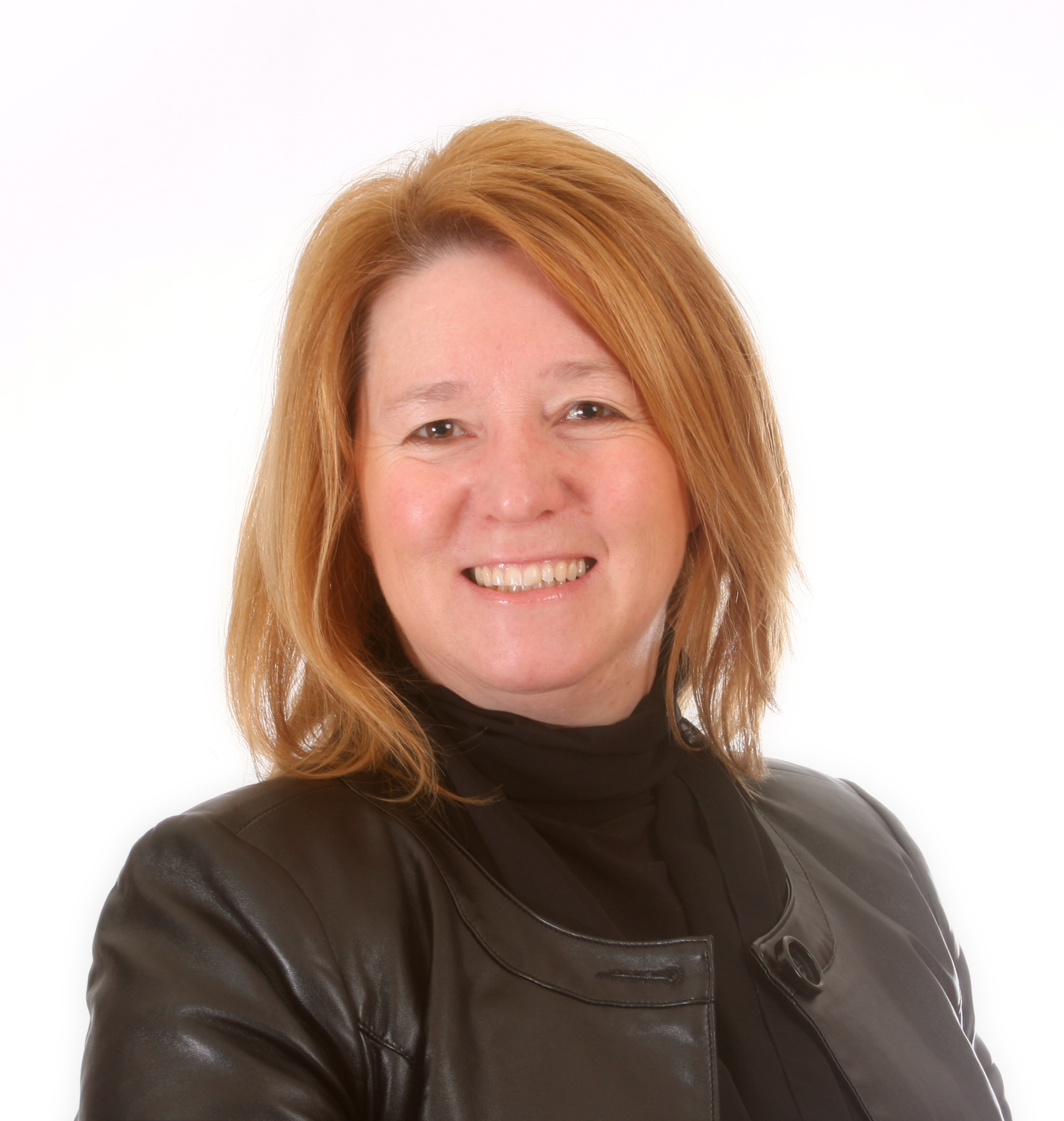

MLA for Stratford-Kinlock
- In office June 12, 2007 – October 18, 2011
- Preceded by: David McKenna
- Succeeded by: James Aylward

Personal details
- Born: May 22, 1962 (age 64) Moncton, New Brunswick
- Party: Liberal

Cynthia King Dunsford (born May 22, 1962) is a Canadian politician.

== Early life ==
Born and raised in Moncton, New Brunswick, King Dunsford attended Hillcrest School and Moncton High School. She worked in the family business, King Sports Ltd., during her school years. She attended the University of Prince Edward Island studying Canadian Studies and Political Science. She was an AUS (AUAA) athlete, as well as a member of the UPEI Student Union and the UPEI Board of Governors.

== Career ==
Before politics, Cynthia King Dunsford's professional career as a writer, comedian and actor took her all across Canada. Her years of experience in theatre, television and radio led to contract work with various arts organizations and production companies. She is best known for her weekly CBC show Parkdale Doris.

King Dunsford has an extensive non-profit work and volunteer background. She served as a Co-Founding Director on the Board of Directors for the Queen Street Commons, a shared workspace fostering social innovation through a place-based hub of people, ideas, services and strategies. She has also served as Vice President of Squash P.E.I.; Director of the Board of the Townships Project; President of Theater P.E.I.; Founding Member of BUG PEI (Bike User Group); Founding Member of the Environmental Coalition of P.E.I.; Board Member of the International Island Games Association; Member of the Canadian Ski Patrol System; a NCCP Squash Coach.

King Dunsford was elected to the Legislative Assembly of Prince Edward Island in the 2007 provincial election. She represented the electoral district of Stratford-Kinlock as a member of the Liberal Party.

In the 63rd Assembly she passed a motion that enabled the Standing Committee on Agriculture, Forestry and Environment to fully review the implementation of a province-wide ban on the use of cosmetic pesticides. Subsequent legislation was passed during the Spring Session of 2009 and the ban was fully implemented in April 2010.

King Dunsford was appointed Chair of the Standing Committee on Education and Innovation and was a Member of the Standing Committee on Community and Intergovernmental Affairs; the Standing Committee on Health, Social Development and Seniors. She initiated the formation of the first PEI Legislative Women's Caucus which mandates to encourage more women to run for public office. King Dunsford was also appointed PEI President of L'assemblee Parlementaire de la Francophonie (APF), an association of the parliaments of Francophone countries around the world.

She was defeated when she ran for re-election in 2011.

== Personal life ==
King Dunsford has two children Ashley and Ian Dunsford. She currently lives in Stratford, Prince Edward Island and owns and operates PEI Cycling Tours, Bits Bikes Brews Cafe/Bar and Brookvale MTB Camps. She also hosts a podcast called The Belong Podcast.
