= William Schurman =

Canadian politician

William Schurman (c. 1743 – September 15, 1819) was a businessman and politician of Prince Edward Island. He was a member of the Legislative Assembly of Prince Edward Island from 1785 to 1787.

He was born in New Rochelle, New York, the son of Jacob Schureman, of Dutch descent, and Jane Parcot, of Huguenot descent. In 1768, he married Jane Bonnet. Schurman married Elizabeth Hyatt in 1778.

Schurman remained loyal to Britain during the American revolution and, in 1783, immigrated to Tryon on St. John's Island (later Prince Edward Island). He settled at Bedeque the following year, setting up a store in his house and engaging in trade with a ship that he owned.

Besides serving in the colony's assembly, he was also a justice of the peace and overseer for roads. After losing his ship in 1799, Schurman became involved in shipbuilding. In 1808, he bought a wooded area along the Wilmot River, constructed a sawmill and entered into the trade in lumber. He died at his home in the Wilmot Valley in 1819.

His great-grandson Jacob Gould Schurman later became president of Cornell University and an American ambassador.
