= Janice Sherry =

Canadian politician

Janice A. Sherry

Member of the Legislative Assembly of Prince Edward Island for Summerside-Wilmot
- In office June 12, 2007 – August 1, 2016
- Preceded by: Gregory Deighan
- Succeeded by: Chris Palmer

Personal details
- Born: June 14, 1960 (age 65) Summerside, Prince Edward Island
- Party: Liberal

Janice Ann Sherry (born 14 June 1960) is a Canadian politician, who served in the Legislative Assembly of Prince Edward Island from 2007 to 2016. She represented the electoral district of Summerside-Wilmot as a member of the Liberal Party. A native and resident of Summerside, Prince Edward Island, Sherry is a former business owner.

== Political career ==
In January 2010, Sherry was appointed to the Executive Council of Prince Edward Island as Minister of Community Services, Seniors and Labour. Following the 2011 election, Sherry was moved to Minister of Environment, Energy and Forestry. She became Minister of Environment, Labour and Justice in November 2011, when Premier Robert Ghiz reduced the number of government departments. Sherry retained the portfolio when Wade MacLauchlan took over as premier in February 2015, but was dropped from cabinet following the 2015 election.

Sherry resigned as MLA for Summerside-Wilmot on August 1, 2016.

== Electoral record ==
2015 Prince Edward Island general election
Party	Candidate	Votes	%	±%
Liberal	Janice Sherry	1,135	39.44	-15.79
Progressive Conservative	Brian Ramsay	1,105	38.39	+1.64
New Democratic	Scott Gaudet	353	12.27	
Green	Donald MacFadzen-Reid	285	9.90	+1.88
Total valid votes		2,878	100.0	
Liberal hold		Swing		-8.72

2011 Prince Edward Island general election
Party	Candidate	Votes	%	±%
Liberal	Janice Sherry	1,315	55.23	-1.87
Progressive Conservative	Shirley Anne Cameron	875	36.75	-3.15
Green	Rosalyn Ridlington Abbott	191	8.02	
Total valid votes		2,381	100.0	
Liberal hold		Swing		+0.64

2007 Prince Edward Island general election
Party	Candidate	Votes	%	±%
Liberal	Janice Sherry	1,645	57.10	+16.65
Progressive Conservative	Gerard McCardle	1,063	39.90	-12.23
New Democratic	Ryan Pollard	173	6.00	-1.41
Total valid votes		2,881	100.0	
Liberal gain from Progressive Conservative		Swing		+14.44
