= Robert Schurman =

Robert Clayton Schurman was the MLA (Assemblyman) for 4th Prince, in Prince Edward Island, Canada.

== Early life ==
Schurman was born on 5 December 1925 in Malden, Massachusetts, United States.

== Career ==
Schurman played for Summerside Crystals from 1941 to 1948. He played for Moncton Hawks briefly from 1946 to 1947.

== Death ==
Schurman died in January 1973.
