= Gregory Deighan =

Canadian politician (born 1939)

28th Speaker of the Legislative Assembly of Prince Edward Island
- In office November 12, 2003 – July 5, 2007
- Preceded by: Mildred Dover
- Succeeded by: Kathleen Casey

Member of the Legislative Assembly of Prince Edward Island for Wilmot-Summerside
- In office November 18, 1996 – May 28, 2007
- Preceded by: Riding Established
- Succeeded by: Janice Sherry

Personal details
- Born: October 15, 1939 (age 86)
- Party: Progressive Conservative

Gregory "Greg" J. Deighan (born 15 October 1939) was the Speaker of the Legislative Assembly of Prince Edward Island, Canada. He was a member of the Progressive Conservative Party, representing the Wilmot-Summerside electoral district.

In May 2000, Deighan was appointed to the Executive Council of Prince Edward Island as Minister of Tourism. In August 2002, Deighan was moved to Minister of Fisheries and Aquaculture. He served as Speaker of the Legislative Assembly from 2003 to 2007.

He did not stand for re-election in the 2007 general election.
