= Ross Young (politician) =

Canadian politician (1962–2021)

Member of the Legislative Assembly of Prince Edward Island
- In office 1991–1996
- Preceded by: Johnny Young
- Succeeded by: District abolished
- Constituency: 1st Kings

Personal details
- Born: Ross Terry Young; March 20, 1962 Souris, Prince Edward Island, Canada
- Died: April 9, 2021 (aged 59)
- Party: Prince Edward Island Liberal Party
- Spouse: Mary Rita Sullivan (m. 1994)
- Children: 3
- Occupation: Politician; teacher; financial advisor

Ross Terry Young (March 20, 1962 – April 9, 2021) was a Canadian provincial-level politician and financial advisor on Prince Edward Island. He served as member of the Legislative Assembly of Prince Edward Island (MLA) from 1991 to 1996, representing 1st Kings and sitting with the Prince Edward Island Liberal Party.

== Early life ==
Young was born in Souris, Prince Edward Island, on March 20, 1962. His father, Ross "Johnny" Young, was also an MLA who represented 1st Kings; his mother was Helen Rae MacLean. He attended Souris Regional School, graduating in 1980, then studied commerce and Canadian studies at Mount Allison University. He later managed a store for several years and was an account executive at the Atlantic Television Network. He subsequently returned to school, obtaining a Bachelor of Arts from the University of Prince Edward Island in 1990.

== Political career ==
Young went into politics in 1991, following the death of his father from cancer the previous year. He won the by-election for 1st Kings (his father's former riding) on March 18, and was re-elected in the 1993 provincial election.

Young served on various legislative committees, most notably on the Election Act and Electoral Boundaries Commission. He consequently put forward a private member's bill on May 6, 1994, to change the province's electoral districts to single-member ridings. The bill passed in the legislature and received royal assent on May 19 of that same year. 1st Kings was subsequently abolished due to redistribution. He lost re-election in the new electoral district of Souris-Elmira in 1996 to Andy Mooney by 128 votes.

== Later work ==
After retiring from politics, Young was employed in financial services, post-secondary education and private consulting. He served as executive assistant for Alan McIsaac, the Minister of Education and Early Childhood Development, starting in October 2011. He also acted as a political panelist on the Canadian Broadcasting Corporation. A Canadian football enthusiast, he oversaw the re-founding of minor football in Eastern Kings, coaching his hometown Souris Wildcats, and the Holland College Hurricanes from 2016 to 2018.

== Personal life ==
Young married Mary Rita Sullivan on December 30, 1994. Together, they had three children: Laura, John Ross, and Jay. Young died on April 9, 2021, at the age of 59.
