= Walter Bradley (Canadian politician) =

Canadian politician (1945–2023)

MLA (Councillor) for 2nd Kings
- In office 1989–1996
- Preceded by: Francis O'Brien
- Succeeded by: riding dissolved

Personal details
- Born: September 29, 1945 St. Theresa's, Prince Edward Island
- Died: June 2, 2023 (aged 77) Morell, Prince Edward Island
- Party: Prince Edward Island Liberal Party

Walter Bradley (September 29, 1945 – June 2, 2023) was a Canadian politician. He represented 2nd Kings in the Legislative Assembly of Prince Edward Island from 1989 to 1996 as a Liberal.

Bradley was born in 1945 in St. Theresa's, Prince Edward Island. He married Janet MacLeod in 1968. Bradley graduated from the University of Prince Edward Island with a Bachelor of Education degree, and from Dalhousie University with a master's degree in education. He was a teacher by career, and later was principal of Morell Regional High School.

Bradley entered provincial politics in 1989, when he was elected a councillor for the electoral district of 2nd Kings. He was re-elected in the 1993 election. On April 15, 1993, Bradley was appointed to the Executive Council of Prince Edward Island as Minister of Agriculture, Fisheries and Forestry. In the 1996 election, Bradley was defeated by Progressive Conservative Kevin MacAdam in the new Morell-Fortune Bay riding.

Bradley died on June 2, 2023, at the age of 77.
