= Don McDougall (baseball) =

Canadian businessman (born 1937)

Don McDougall CM
- Born: December 15, 1937 (age 88); Charlottetown, Prince Edward Island, Canada
- Education: Saint Dunstan's University; University of Western Ontario
- Employer: Labatt Brewing Company
- Known for: Bringing Major League Baseball to Toronto
- Baseball career

Member of the Canadian

Baseball Hall of Fame
- Induction: 2002

Don McDougall CM (born December 15, 1937) is a Canadian businessman. He served as president of the Labatt Brewing Company, and led the group that successfully lobbied for a Major League Baseball expansion team, the Toronto Blue Jays.

== Biography ==
McDougall was born in Charlottetown, Prince Edward Island. He graduated from Saint Dunstan's University with a bachelor's degree, and earned his MBA from the University of Western Ontario.

He worked in several managerial positions for the Labatt Brewing Company, before being named the company's president in 1973. He resigned in 1980 to run for office in the federal elections as a member of the Progressive Conservative Party of Canada.

One of his tasks as president was to secure a Major League Baseball franchise for the brewery and the city of Toronto. He had to overcome a failed attempt to bring the San Francisco Giants to the city, and also had to fend off a rival group of businessmen with the same goal of bringing baseball north. He was part of the team that eventually brought the Toronto Blue Jays into existence in 1976, and was the club's founding director.

McDougall is a brother of Pat Mella, who served as leader of the Progressive Conservative Party of Prince Edward Island from 1990 to 1996.

== Electoral record ==
1980 Canadian federal election
Party	Candidate	Votes	%	±%
Liberal	Judd Buchanan	27,118	44.2	+1.8
Progressive Conservative	Don McDougall	25,031	40.8	-0.7
New Democratic	Paddy Musson	8,817	14.4	-1.4
Rhinoceros	Stewart Showers	224	0.4	
Libertarian	Richard Keys	159	0.3	-0.1
Marxist–Leninist	John Stafford	35	0.1	0.0
Total valid votes		61,384	100.0	

== Honours and affiliations ==
- In 2002, McDougall was inducted into the Canadian Baseball Hall of Fame.
- In 2008, the University of Prince Edward Island named a new building after McDougall and his wife, Marion, to honour their commitment to higher learning and philanthropic efforts.
- In 2009, he was inducted into the London Business Hall of Fame.
- In 2014, the University of Prince Edward Island installed McDougall as Chancellor.
- In 2014, he is a member of the University of Waterloo Stratford Campus Advisory Board.
- He was appointed to the Order of Canada in June 2023.
