= Robert Maddix =

Canadian politician

Robert Joseph Maddix (born September 26, 1960) is a civil servant and former political figure on Prince Edward Island of Acadian origin. He represented 3rd Prince and then Evangeline-Miscouche in the Legislative Assembly of Prince Edward Island from 1993 to 1999 as a Liberal.

He was born in Wellington, Prince Edward Island, the son of Réné Maddix and Alice Gallant, and was educated at the Université de Moncton and Holland College. In 1982, he married Cathy Fraser. Maddix worked as a tourism development officer for the Department of Tourism and Parks from 1988 to 1992. He was opposition house leader from 1999 to 2000. Maddix was defeated when he ran for reelection in 2000. After retiring from politics, he was employed as an economic development officer at Baie Acadienne.
