= 4th Prince =

Former provincial electoral district in Prince Edward Island, Canada

Prince Edward Island electoral district
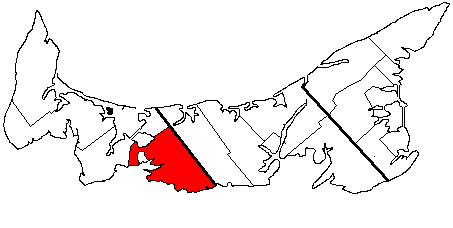

Defunct provincial electoral district
- Legislature: Legislative Assembly of Prince Edward Island
- District created: 1873
- District abolished: 1996
- First contested: 1873
- Last contested: 1993

Demographics
- Census division: Prince County

4th Prince was a provincial electoral district of Prince Edward Island, Canada, which elected two members to the Legislative Assembly of Prince Edward Island from 1873 to 1993.

The district comprised the easternmost portion of Prince County, except for the city of Summerside. It was abolished in 1996.

== Members ==
=== Dual member ===
Assembly	Years	Member	Party	Member	Party
26th	1873–1876	Augustus Holland	Conservative	Cornelius Howatt	Conservative
27th	1876–1879	John Calhoun	Liberal	William Lea	Liberal
28th	1879–1882	Augustus Holland	Conservative	George Bentley	Conservative
29th	1882–1886	Augustus Holland	Conservative	George Bentley	Conservative
30th	1886–1890	John Bell	Liberal	George Bentley	Conservative
31st	1890–1893	John Bell	Liberal	George Bentley	Conservative

=== Assemblyman-Councillor ===
Assembly	Years	Assemblyman	Party	Councillor	Party
32nd	1893–1896	John Bell	Liberal	Alexander Laird	Liberal
32nd	1896–1897	John Bell	Liberal	William Campbell	Conservative
33rd	1897–1898	John Bell	Liberal	Peter MacNutt	Liberal
33rd	1899–1900	Samuel Reid	Liberal	Peter MacNutt	Liberal
34th	1900–1904	Samuel Reid	Liberal	Joseph Read	Liberal
35th	1904–1908	Samuel Reid	Liberal	Joseph Read	Liberal
36th	1908–1909	James Kennedy	Conservative	Joseph Read	Liberal
36th	1909–1912	James Kennedy	Conservative	Michael Delaney	Conservative
37th	1912–1915	James Kennedy	Conservative	Michael Delaney	Conservative
38th	1915–1919	John Bell	Liberal	Walter Lea	Liberal
39th	1919–1923	John Bell	Liberal	Walter Lea	Liberal
40th	1923–1927	Whitefield Bentley	Conservative	John Myers	Conservative
41st	1927–1931	Horace Wright	Liberal	Walter Lea	Liberal
42nd	1931–1935	Heath Strong	Conservative	Walter Lea	Liberal
43rd	1935–1936	Cleveland Baker	Liberal	Walter Lea	Liberal
43rd	1936–1939	Cleveland Baker	Liberal	Horace Wright	Liberal
44th	1939–1943	Cleveland Baker	Liberal	Horace Wright	Liberal
45th	1943–1947	Heath Strong	Progressive Conservative	Horace Wright	Liberal
46th	1947–1949	Cleveland Baker	Liberal	Horace Wright	Liberal
46th	1949–1951	Cleveland Baker	Liberal	George MacKay	Liberal
47th	1951–1955	George MacKay	Liberal	Cleveland Baker	Liberal
48th	1955–1959	George MacKay	Liberal	Cleveland Baker	Liberal
49th	1959–1962	George MacKay	Liberal	Cleveland Baker	Liberal
50th	1962–1966	George MacKay	Liberal	Frank Jardine	Liberal
51st	1966–1970	Max Thompson	Liberal	Frank Jardine	Liberal
52nd	1970–1973	Robert Schurman	Liberal	Frank Jardine	Liberal
52nd	1973–1974	vacant		Frank Jardine	Liberal
53rd	1974–1978	Catherine Callbeck	Liberal	Frank Jardine	Liberal
54th	1978–1979	William MacDougall	Progressive Conservative	Prowse Chappel	Progressive Conservative
55th	1979–1982	William MacDougall	Progressive Conservative	Prowse Chappel	Progressive Conservative
56th	1982–1985	William MacDougall	Progressive Conservative	Prowse Chappel	Progressive Conservative
56th	1985–1986	Stavert Huestis	Liberal	Prowse Chappel	Progressive Conservative
57th	1986–1989	Stavert Huestis	Liberal	Prowse Chappel	Progressive Conservative
58th	1989–1993	Stavert Huestis	Liberal	Libbe Hubley	Liberal
59th	1993–1996	Stavert Huestis	Liberal	Libbe Hubley	Liberal

== Election results ==
=== 1989 ===
==== Councillor ====
1989 Prince Edward Island general election
Party	Candidate	Votes	%	±%
Liberal	Libbe Hubley	4,158	56.46	+16.91
Progressive Conservative	Don MacFarlane	2,642	35.88	-14.00
New Democratic	Margaret Arsenault	564	7.66	-2.91
Total valid votes		7,364	98.38	
Total rejected ballots		121	1.62	+0.33
Turnout		7,485	72.86	-7.41
Eligible voters		10,273		
Liberal gain from Progressive Conservative		Swing		+15.45
Source: Elections Prince Edward Island

==== Assemblyman ====
1989 Prince Edward Island general election
Party	Candidate	Votes	%	±%
Liberal	Stavert Huestis	4,343	58.98	+15.67
Progressive Conservative	Royce Green	2,453	33.31	-9.01
New Democratic	Larry Duchesne	582	7.90	-6.81
Total valid votes		7,378	98.69	
Total rejected ballots		98	1.31	+0.37
Turnout		7,476	72.77	-7.49
Eligible voters		10,273		
Liberal hold		Swing		+12.34
Source: Elections Prince Edward Island

=== 1993 ===
==== Councillor ====
1993 Prince Edward Island general election
Party	Candidate	Votes	%	±%
Liberal	Libbe Hubley	4,342	57.07	+0.61
Progressive Conservative	Don MacFarlane	2,668	35.07	-0.81
New Democratic	Margaret Arsenault	598	7.86	+0.20
Total valid votes		7,608	98.47	
Total rejected ballots		118	1.53	-0.09
Turnout		7,726	74.20	+1.34
Eligible voters		10,412		
Liberal hold		Swing		+0.71
Source: Elections Prince Edward Island

==== Assemblyman ====
1993 Prince Edward Island general election
Party	Candidate	Votes	%	±%
Liberal	Stavert Huestis	4,215	55.40	-3.57
Progressive Conservative	Fred McCardle	2,568	33.75	+0.44
New Democratic	Larry Duchesne	825	10.84	+2.94
Total valid votes		7,608	98.52	
Total rejected ballots		114	1.48	+0.17
Turnout		7,722	74.16	+1.39
Eligible voters		10,412		
Liberal hold		Swing		-2.01
Source: Elections Prince Edward Island

== See also ==
- List of Prince Edward Island provincial electoral districts
- Canadian provincial electoral districts
