= Gilbert Clements =

Canadian politician (1928–2012)

The Honourable Gilbert Clements OPEI

25th Lieutenant Governor of Prince Edward Island
- In office 30 August 1995 – 28 May 2001
- Monarch: Elizabeth II
- Governors General: Roméo LeBlanc; Adrienne Clarkson
- Premier: Catherine Callbeck; Keith Milligan; Pat Binns
- Preceded by: Marion Reid
- Succeeded by: Léonce Bernard

Interim leader of the Prince Edward Island Liberal Party
- In office 13 April 1981 – 24 October 1981
- Preceded by: Bennett Campbell
- Succeeded by: Joe Ghiz

MLA (Councillor) for 4th Kings
- In office 11 May 1970 – 24 April 1978
- Preceded by: Keir Clark
- Succeeded by: Johnnie Williams
- In office 23 April 1979 – 30 August 1995
- Preceded by: Johnnie Williams
- Succeeded by: riding abolished

Personal details
- Born: Gilbert Ralph Clements; 11 September 1928 Victoria Cross, Montague, Prince Edward Island
- Died: 27 November 2012 (aged 84) Montague, Prince Edward Island
- Party: Liberal
- Spouse: Wilma Catherine MacLure (m. 1953)
- Children: Robert, David, Gail
- Education: Montague Memorial School; Mount Allison University
- Occupation: electrical contractor, merchant, realtor, insurance agent
- Profession: politician
- Cabinet: Minister of Municipal Affairs (1974–1978); Minister of Environment (1974–1978); Minister of Tourism (1974–1978); Minister of Parks and Conservation (1974–1978); Minister of Finance (1986–1993); Minister of Community and Cultural Affairs (1986–1989); Minister of the Environment (1989–1993)

Gilbert Ralph Clements OPEI (11 September 1928 – 27 November 2012) was a Canadian politician and the 25th Lieutenant Governor of Prince Edward Island from 1995 to 2001.

Born in Victoria Cross, Prince Edward Island, he was first elected to the Legislative Assembly of Prince Edward Island in 1970 representing 4th Kings. He was re-elected in 1974, 1979, 1982, 1986, 1989, and 1993. He held the following positions: Minister Municipal Affairs, Environment & Tourism, Parks & Conservation (1974–1978), Opposition Critic for Finance and Energy (1979–1986), Minister of Finance & Minister of Community and Cultural Affairs (1986–1989), and Minister of Finance & Minister of the Environment (1989–1993).

In 1981, he was interim Prince Edward Island Liberal Party Leader and opposition party leader. He became interim leader following the resignation of leader and former premier Bennett Campbell and served until Joe Ghiz was elected as leader.

Clements died at age 84, in Montague, Prince Edward Island.

== Arms ==
Coat of arms of Gilbert Clements

Notes
Granted 8 November 1996.
Crest
Issuant from a mural coronet Or masoned Gules set above with five oak leaves Vert a demi lion Gules holding in its dexter forepaw a fly fishing rod Or.
Escutcheon
Gules on an island an oak tree fructed between dexter one oak sapling and sinister two oak saplings in chief a coronet érablé in chevron with on either side two single lens reflex camera affronty all Or.
Supporters
On a mound Vert set with ladyslippers proper rising above barry wavy of four Argent and Azure on either side an English setter Or gorged with a collar chequy Azure and Argent pendant therefrom a torteau charged with a representation of the Mace of the Legislative Assembly of the Province of Prince Edward Island Or.
Motto
Through A Lens Clearly
