= Rose Marie MacDonald =

Canadian politician

Assemblyman for 5th Kings
- In office 1988–1996
- Preceded by: Arthur MacDonald
- Succeeded by: riding dissolved

Personal details
- Born: Rose Marie MacLean; July 3, 1941 Woodville Mills, Prince Edward Island
- Died: September 3, 2012 (aged 71)
- Party: Liberal
- Spouse: Ronald MacDonald

Rose Marie MacDonald, née MacLean (July 3, 1941 – September 3, 2012) was a Canadian politician, who represented 5th Kings in the Legislative Assembly of Prince Edward Island from 1988 to 1996. She was a member of the Prince Edward Island Liberal Party.

Born in Woodville Mills, Prince Edward Island, she worked as a cook, as an office clerk and as an employee of the Bank of Montreal prior to her career in politics.

She was first elected to the legislature in a by-election in 1988, and was reelected in the general elections of 1989 and 1993. As a member of the assembly, she chaired the committee on education, community and cultural affairs, the committee on natural resources and the environment and a special committee on legislative reform, and served as the Liberal caucus whip. On April 20, 1995, she was speaking in the legislature when a pipe bomb exploded outside the building, sending glass flying into the chamber.

At the 1996 regional conference of the Commonwealth Parliamentary Association, MacDonald was a panelist, alongside Lloyd Snow of Newfoundland and Maynard Sonntag of Saskatchewan, at a seminar on the social and legal implications of government-sponsored gambling initiatives.

In the 1996 election, she was defeated by Michael Currie of the Progressive Conservatives in the new district of Georgetown-Baldwin's Road.

She later served on the board of directors of the Souris Hospital, the Island Community Theatre and the Canada Mortgage and Housing Corporation.
