= Barry Hicken =

Canadian politician

MLA (Councillor) for 5th Kings
- In office 1986–1996
- Preceded by: Lowell Johnston
- Succeeded by: riding dissolved

Personal details
- Born: August 8, 1946 (age 79) Pembroke, Prince Edward Island
- Party: Prince Edward Island Liberal Party

Barry Hicken (born August 8, 1946) is a Canadian politician and farmer. He represented 5th Kings in the Legislative Assembly of Prince Edward Island from 1986 to 1996 as a Liberal.

Hicken was born in 1946 in Pembroke, Prince Edward Island. He was educated at Montague Regional High School and Holland College, and was a mechanic by career. He married Louise Alice McHerron in 1972.

Hicken first attempted to enter provincial politics in the 1982 election, but was defeated by Progressive Conservative Lowell Johnston. Hicken ran again in 1986, and was elected councillor for the electoral district of 5th Kings. He was re-elected in 1989. On June 6, 1989, Hicken was appointed to the Executive Council of Prince Edward Island as Minister of Energy and Forestry. In November 1991, he was moved to Minister of Community and Cultural Affairs and Minister of Fisheries and Aquaculture. In January 1993, he was given an additional role as Minister responsible for Francophone Affairs. Hicken was re-elected in the 1993 election, and was appointed Minister of Environmental Resources on April 15. In the 1996 election, Hicken was defeated by Progressive Conservative leader Pat Binns in the new Murray River-Gaspereaux riding.
