= Lynwood MacPherson =

Canadian politician

MLA (Councillor) for 4th Queens
- In office 1986–1996
- Preceded by: Daniel Compton
- Succeeded by: riding dissolved

Personal details
- Born: September 21, 1947 (age 78) Charlottetown, Prince Edward Island
- Party: Prince Edward Island Liberal Party

Lynwood MacPherson (born September 21, 1947) is a Canadian politician, farmer, and businessman. He represented 4th Queens in the Legislative Assembly of Prince Edward Island from 1986 to 1996 as a Liberal.

MacPherson was born in 1947 in Charlottetown, Prince Edward Island. A Montague Regional High School graduate, he married Mary Patricia Evans in 1973. Before entering politics, MacPherson was a tobacco farmer, a shareholder, and a plant manager for Belfast Tobacco Growers Limited.

MacPherson entered provincial politics in 1986 when he was elected a councillor for the electoral district of 4th Queens. He was re-elected in the 1989 and 1993 elections. On May 21, 1996, MacPherson was appointed as Minister of Provincial Affairs and Attorney General to the Executive Council of Prince Edward Island. In the 1996 election, MacPherson was defeated by former Progressive Conservative MLA Wilbur MacDonald in the new Belfast-Pownal Bay riding.
