= Tom Dunphy =

Canadian politician (1937–2025)

MLA (Councillor) for 3rd Queens
- In office 1986–1996
- Preceded by: Fred Driscoll
- Succeeded by: Riding dissolved

Personal details
- Born: December 12, 1937 Peakes Station, Prince Edward Island, Canada
- Died: May 24, 2025 (aged 87) Charlottetown, Prince Edward Island, Canada
- Party: Prince Edward Island Liberal Party

Thomas Joseph Dunphy (December 12, 1937 – May 24, 2025) was a Canadian politician, teacher and realtor. He represented 3rd Queens in the Legislative Assembly of Prince Edward Island from 1986 to 1996 as a Liberal.

== Life and career ==
Dunphy was born on December 12, 1937 in Peakes Station, Prince Edward Island. Dunphy graduated from the Nova Scotia Agricultural College with a two-year degree in agricultural studies in 1958, and from Macdonald College at McGill University with a Bachelor of Science in agriculture in 1960. He was married to Rita Kenny, and then Marion MacRae-Gillis in 1978. Dunphy had 4 children Peter, Maggie, Kimberley, and Tracy, as well as 4 grandchildren, Sebastian, Sarah, Liam and Patrick. Prior to entering politics, Dunphy was a teacher in Prince Edward Island and Quebec. He also worked with Dr Leo Killorn in the PEI addiction treatment centre.

Dunphy entered provincial politics in 1986, when he was elected a councillor for the electoral district of 3rd Queens. He was re-elected in the 1989 election. In November 1991, Dunphy was appointed to the Executive Council of Prince Edward Island as Minister of Transportation and Public Works. Dunphy was re-elected in 1993, but was dropped from cabinet following the election. He did not re-offer in the 1996 election. Following his political career, Dunphy worked as a realtor. Dunphy died at a hospital in Charlottetown, Prince Edward Island on May 24, 2025.
