= Betty Jean Brown =

Canadian politician

Betty Jean Brown (born October 31, 1937) is a registered nurse and former political figure in Prince Edward Island. She represented 3rd Queens in the Legislative Assembly of Prince Edward Island from 1986 to 1993 as a Liberal.

She was born Betty Jean Roberts in Charlottetown, Prince Edward Island, the daughter of Gordon Roberts, and was educated at the Prince of Wales College and the Prince Edward Island Hospital School of Nursing. She helped operate the family fur farm in Southport and also worked as a nurse practitioner. She served on the Southport Village Commission and was chair in 1976. In 1979, she was elected president of the Prince Edward Island Federation of Municipalities. She ran unsuccessfully for a seat in the provincial assembly in 1982. In 1986, she married Murdo M. Brown. Brown served in the province's Executive Council as Minister of Education from 1986 to 1989. She was defeated when she ran for reelection in 1993.
