= Walter McEwen =

Canadian politician

Walter A. McEwen

MLA for 5th Prince
- In office 1989–1996
- Preceded by: Andy Walker
- Succeeded by: riding dissolved

Personal details
- Born: January 31, 1940 Montague, Prince Edward Island, Canada
- Died: August 1, 2023 (aged 83)
- Party: Liberal Party

Walter A. McEwen, QC (January 31, 1940 – August 1, 2023) was a lawyer and former Canadian politician, who served in the Legislative Assembly of Prince Edward Island from 1989 to 1996.

He was the son of Ted McEwen and Mary Burke and was educated at Saint Dunstan's University, receiving a BSc, and Dalhousie University, where he studied law. In 1965, he married Myrna Nicholson. After graduating from Dalhousie in 1971, McEwen moved to Toronto and was admitted to the Ontario bar in March 1973. He then returned to Prince Edward Island, was admitted to the bar in October 1973 and set up practice in Summerside. He was named Queen's Counsel in 1986.

A member of the Liberal Party, he represented the electoral district of 5th Prince. McEwen served in the province's Executive Council as Minister of Provincial Affairs, Attorney General and Minister of Health and Social Services. After he retired from politics, McEwen returned to the practice of law. He also served as a member of the National Parole Board of Canada.
