= Marion Murphy =

Canadian politician (born 1941)

Marion Murphy (born August 21, 1941) is an educator, business person and former political figure on Prince Edward Island. She represented 1st Queens in the Legislative Assembly of Prince Edward Island from 1989 to 1996 as a Liberal.

Murphy was born Marion Larsen in Cape Traverse, Prince Edward Island, the daughter of Marius Larsen and Nellie Heffel, and was educated at Prince of Wales College and the University of Prince Edward Island. In 1964, she married Elmer Murphy. She taught school from 1958 to 1972. Murphy was involved in operating the family farm and sawmill in Millvale. She was an unsuccessful candidate for a seat in the provincial assembly in 1986 before being elected in 1989.
