= Roberta Hubley =

Canadian politician

MLA from 3rd Kings
- In office 1989–1996
- Preceded by: Peter MacLeod
- Succeeded by: riding dissolved

Personal details
- Born: Roberta Mildred MacPhee; May 27, 1941 (age 84) Hopefield, Prince Edward Island, Canada
- Party: Prince Edward Island Liberal Party

Roberta Hubley (born May 27, 1941) is a former Canadian politician. Hubley served in the Legislative Assembly of Prince Edward Island from 1989 to 1996. She represented the electoral district of 3rd Kings as a member of the Prince Edward Island Liberal Party.

Hubley was born in Hopefield, Prince Edward Island.
