= Peter Doucette =

Canadian politician (1954–2019)

Peter Vincent Doucette (August 14, 1954 – January 4, 2019) was a Canadian politician who served in the Legislative Assembly of Prince Edward Island from 1989 to 1996.

Doucette was born in Charlottetown, Prince Edward Island. He lived in the United States for a portion of his childhood, and graduated from high school in Quincy, Massachusetts. Doucette's first political experience was serving as youth campaign manager for United States Senator Ted Kennedy. Doucette then enrolled at Stonehill College. He worked at the Regional Co-operative Development Centre in Moncton, where he was program manager, and as a contractor with Georgetown Shipyard. Doucette later moved to Montague in his home province. In 1986, Doucette helped establish the Southern Kings and Queens Food Bank and served on its advisory board through 1989. Between 1987 and 1990, Doucette was secretary-treasurer of the Montague Lions Club.

He was elected to the Legislative Assembly of Prince Edward Island, twice as a Liberal Party candidate, in 1989 and 1993, and chose not to run again in 1996. Doucette later served as Montague city councillor. He was also a board member of many local and provincial organizations, among them Artisans on Main in Montague, Health PEI, Montague Economic Development Corporation, and the Prince Edward Island Council of People with Disabilities. Doucette died on January 4, 2019, at Queen Elizabeth Hospital in Charlottetown, aged 64.
