= Pat Mella =

Canadian politician and teacher

Leader of the Progressive Conservative Party of Prince Edward Island
- In office November 10, 1990 – May 4, 1996
- Preceded by: Melbourne Gass
- Succeeded by: Pat Binns

Member of the Legislative Assembly of Prince Edward Island for Glen Stewart-Bellevue Cove (3rd Queens; 1993–1996)
- In office March 29, 1993 – September 29, 2003
- Preceded by: Russell Perry
- Succeeded by: David McKenna

Personal details
- Born: Patricia Janet MacDougal; August 29, 1943 (age 83) Port Hill, Prince Edward Island, Canada
- Spouse: Angelo Mella
- Education: Saint Dunstan's University; University of Prince Edward Island

Patricia Janet Mella (née MacDougal; born August 29, 1943) is a Canadian politician and former teacher. Mella was Prince Edward Island Progressive Conservative Party (PC) leader from 1990 to 1996 and an elected member of the Legislative Assembly of Prince Edward Island from 1993 to 2003.

== Early life ==
She was born Patricia McDougall in Port Hill, Prince Edward Island (along with her twin sister, Peggy) and was educated at Saint Dunstan's University and the University of Prince Edward Island. A teacher and lecturer, she married Angelo Mella while teaching at St. Patrick's College in Ottawa.

Mella is a sister of Canadian businessman Don McDougall, who was a founder of the Toronto Blue Jays.

== Career ==
Mella entered political life, having been an unsuccessful candidate in the 1989 provincial election as a member of the Prince Edward Island Progressive Conservative Party. She served as the Leader of the party from 1990 to 1996 and Leader of the Opposition from 1993 to 1996. She represented 3rd Queens from 1993 to 1996, and then Glen Stewart-Bellevue Cove from 1996 to 2003.

Elected with the government of Premier Pat Binns in 1996, she served as Provincial Treasurer (Minister of Finance) until 2003.

Mella retired from the legislature before the 2003 provincial general election and did not reoffer.

In 2004, Mella was appointed with Douglas MacArthur and Matt Power to chair the Prince Edward Island Conservative Party of Canada federal election campaign.
