= Libbe Hubley =

Canadian politician

The Honourable Elizabeth M. "Libbe" Hubley

Canadian Senator from Prince Edward Island
- In office March 8, 2001 – September 8, 2017
- Nominated by: Jean Chrétien
- Appointed by: Adrienne Clarkson

Member of the Legislative Assembly of Prince Edward Island from 4th Prince
- In office 1989–1996 Serving with Stavert Huestis
- Preceded by: Prowse Chappel
- Succeeded by: riding dissolved

Personal details
- Born: September 8, 1942 (age 83) Howlan, Prince Edward Island, Canada
- Party: Liberal (until 2014); Independent Liberal (2014-present)
- Other political affiliations: Prince Edward Island Liberal Party

Elizabeth M. "Libbe" Hubley (born September 8, 1942) is a Canadian politician who sat in the Senate of Canada representing Prince Edward Island from 2001 until her retirement in 2017.

In 1989 she was elected to Prince Edward Island's legislative assembly as a Liberal. She was re-elected in 1993 and served as Deputy Speaker of the legislature from 1993 to 1996.

On March 8, 2001, Hubley was appointed to the Canadian Senate on the advice of Prime Minister Jean Chrétien. Beginning in 2006, she was the Deputy Whip of the Liberal Party.

On January 29, 2014, Liberal Party leader Justin Trudeau announced all Liberal Senators, including Hubley, were removed from the Liberal caucus, and would continue sitting as Independents. The Senators continue to refer to themselves as the Senate Liberal Caucus even though they are no longer members of the parliamentary Liberal caucus.

Hubley is a past member and longtime supporter of the Girl Guides of Canada.
