= Gordon MacInnis =

Canadian politician

Gordon MacInnis (born July 13, 1945) is a Canadian businessman, former educator and political figure on Prince Edward Island. He represented 2nd Queens in the Legislative Assembly of Prince Edward Island from 1986 to 1996 as a Liberal.

He was born in Charlottetown, Prince Edward Island, the son of Ernest MacInnis and Celia Stevenson, and was educated at Prince of Wales College and the University of Prince Edward Island. In 1968, he married Winnifred Anne Lowther. MacInnis served in the province's Executive Council as Minister of Tourism in 1986, as Minister of Transportation and Public Works from 1989 to 1991, as Minister of Tourism and Parks and Recreation from 1991 to 1993, as Minister of Education from 1993 to 1996 and as Minister of Human Resources from 1994 to 1996. He was defeated when he ran for re-election in 1996.

In 2005, he was named to the board of directors for the Canadian Tourism Commission.
