= Stavert Huestis =

Canadian politician

Assemblyman from 4th Prince
- In office 1984–1996 Serving with Prowse Chappel (1985-89), Libbe Hubley (1989-96)
- Preceded by: William MacDougall
- Succeeded by: riding dissolved

Personal details
- Born: June 20, 1938 (age 87)
- Party: Prince Edward Island Liberal Party

Stavert Huestis (born June 20, 1938) is a farmer and former political figure on Prince Edward Island. He represented 4th Prince in the Legislative Assembly of Prince Edward Island from 1984 to 1996 as a Liberal.

He was born in Wilmot Valley, Prince Edward Island, the son of Ira W. Huestis and Etta Jean Stavert. In partnership with his brother, Huestis was involved in potato and grain farming. In 1964, he married Edith MacGregor. Huestis ran unsuccessfully for a seat in the provincial assembly in 1978 but was later elected in a 1984 by-election held after William MacDougall left the province. He was defeated when he ran for reelection in the new district of Borden-Kinkora in 1996.

Huestis was deputy speaker from 1989 to 1993.
