= Keith Milligan =

Canadian politician

29th Premier of Prince Edward Island
- In office October 9, 1996 – November 27, 1996
- Monarch: Elizabeth II
- Lieutenant Governor: Gilbert Clements
- Preceded by: Catherine Callbeck
- Succeeded by: Pat Binns

Leader of the Prince Edward Island Liberal Party
- In office October 5, 1996 – March 5, 1999
- Preceded by: Catherine Callbeck
- Succeeded by: Wayne Carew

Member of the Legislative Assembly of Prince Edward Island for Cascumpec-Grand River (2nd Prince; 1981–1996)
- In office February 2, 1981 – April 17, 2000
- Preceded by: George Henderson (1980)
- Succeeded by: Philip Brown

Personal details
- Born: Keith Wayne Milligan; February 8, 1950 (age 76) Inverness, Prince Edward Island, Canada
- Party: Liberal
- Spouse: Deborah Foley (m. 1978)
- Children: 3
- Education: University of PEI
- Occupation: Teacher; farmer
- Profession: Politician
- Cabinet: Minister of Health and Social Services (1986–1989); Minister Responsible for the Hospital and Health Services Commission (1986–1989); Minister of Agriculture (1989–1993); Minister of Education and Human Resources (1993–1994); Minister of Transportation and Public Works (1994–1996)

Keith Wayne Milligan (born February 8, 1950) is a Canadian politician who was the 29th premier of Prince Edward Island, serving for seven weeks in the autumn of 1996. He was educated at Inverness District School, O'Leary Regional High School and the University of PEI, where he obtained Bachelor of Arts and Bachelor of Education degrees. He is married to the former Deborah Foley and they reside in Tyne Valley. They have three children - Charles Christian (Jolene), Olivia (Shawn) and Dustin.

== Provincial politics ==
He was first elected to the Legislative Assembly of PEI in a by-election on February 2, 1981, and was re-elected in the general elections of 1982, 1986, 1989, 1993 and 1996. He served as interim Leader of the Opposition and Critic for Education. In 1986 he was appointed Minister of Health and Social Services and Minister Responsible for the Hospital and Health Services Commission. In 1989, Milligan was appointed Minister of Agriculture. In 1993 he was appointed Minister of Education and Human Resources and in 1994 he was appointed Minister of Transportation and Public Works.

=== Brief tenure as Premier ===
In October 1996, he was chosen leader of the governing Liberal party and became Premier, following Catherine Callbeck's resignation. Milligan's Liberals lost the following November provincial election to Pat Binns' Progressive Conservatives.

== Federal politics ==
Having announced he would be seeking the Liberal nomination in the federal riding of Egmont, on November 3, 2007, at the nominating Liberal convention, he lost the nomination to Robert Morrissey. When Morrissey stepped down, however, Milligan was acclaimed as the new candidate on September 5, 2008. He lost to Conservative candidate, Gail Shea in the 2008 election, in one of the narrowest results in the country. A requested recount did not affect the result, and Milligan conceded.

== Since 2008 ==
Milligan is a former elk farmer and silver fox rancher. He has previously been employed as a teacher with the Unit 1 School board and Regional Director of the West Prince Services Centre. He has been vice-president of the Tyne Valley Community Oyster Festival, a member of the West Prince Community Advisory Board, the Canadian National Fur Breeders' Association, the PEI Fur Breeders' Association, the Tyne Valley Fireman's Club and the Tyne Valley Community Sports Centre.

== Electoral record ==
2008 Canadian federal election: Egmont
Party	Candidate	Votes	%	±%	Expenditures
Conservative	Gail Shea	8,110	43.93	+12.97	$51,795.67
Liberal	Keith Milligan	8,055	43.63	-9.54	$45,007.86
New Democratic	Orville Lewis	1,670	9.05	-0.50	$2,245.18
Green	Rebecca Ridlington	626	3.39	-1.80	$2,678.98
Total valid votes/expense limit		18,461	100.0		$67,686
Total rejected, unmarked and declined ballots		115	0.62	+0.01	
Turnout		18,576	68.15	-3.57	
Eligible voters		27,256			
Conservative gain from Liberal		Swing		+11.26	
