= Ron MacKinley =

Canadian politician (born 1947)

Interim Leader of the Prince Edward Island Liberal Party
- In office April 17, 2000 – April 5, 2003
- Preceded by: Wayne Carew
- Succeeded by: Robert Ghiz

Member of the Legislative Assembly of Prince Edward Island for Cornwall-Meadowbank North River-Rice Point (1996-2007)
- In office November 18, 1996 – May 4, 2015
- Preceded by: Riding Established
- Succeeded by: Heath MacDonald

Councillor of the Legislative Assembly of Prince Edward Island for 2nd Queens
- In office December 2, 1985 – November 18, 1996
- Preceded by: Lloyd MacPhail
- Succeeded by: Riding Abolished

Personal details
- Born: August 24, 1947 (age 79) Charlottetown, Prince Edward Island, Canada
- Party: Liberal
- Spouse: Anne Clarkin (m. 1969–2026)
- Children: 3
- Occupation: Farmer; farm chemical salesperson; snow removal business person
- Profession: Politician
- Cabinet: Minister of Transportation and Public Works (2007–2010); Minister of Transportation and Infrastructure Renewal (2010–2011); Minister of Fisheries, Aquaculture and Rural Development (2011–2015)

Ronald William "Ronnie" MacKinley (born August 24, 1947) is a Prince Edward Island Liberal politician, and former member of the Legislative Assembly of Prince Edward Island.

== Early life ==
Born in Charlottetown, MacKinley is the son of John McKinley and Mildred Sellar. He was raised on the family farm in the rural community of North River which was amalgamated into the town of Cornwall in 1996. Before running for office, MacKinley worked as a farmer in North River. Apart from owning and operating his farm, he co-owns MacKinley Brothers beef farm with his mother and his son. He was married to Anne Clarkin on 2 August 1969 and remained married until her death in 2026. He and Clarkin had three children and five grandchildren.

MacKinley has served as vice-chair of the Elliot River CIC; as a director of the P.E.I. Federation of Agriculture and of the P.E.I. Farm Centre. In addition to this, he is a former member of the Canadian Horticultural Council Labour Board and Uniform Legislation Board, as well as a former Queens County Chair for the P.E.I. Potato Producers' Association.

== Political career ==
MacKinley enjoyed a long political career. He was first elected to represent his riding in a 1985 by-election, and served continuously until 2015.

In the 2000 provincial election, MacKinley was the sole Liberal MLA elected, and also the only Opposition MLA. As a result of this, he served as Leader of the Opposition and de facto Liberal leader until 2003, when he was replaced in both capacities by Robert Ghiz. MacKinley has served as Opposition Critic for Transportation and Public Works, Agriculture, Forestry, Fisheries and Aquaculture; he was the Chairman of the important Public Accounts Committee of the legislature, which must always be chaired by a member of the Opposition.

On 12 June 2007, MacKinley assumed office as Minister of Transportation and Public Works, serving under PEI Premier Robert Ghiz. His position was renamed to Minister of Transportation and Infrastructure Renewal during a government reorganization on 13 January 2010.

MacKinley announced his retirement from politics on 10 February 2015, choosing not to seek re-election in the 2015 provincial campaign.
