= 1955 Prince Edward Island general election =

Canadian provincial election

← 1951	May 25, 1955	1959 →

All 30 seats in the Legislative Assembly of Prince Edward Island 16 seats needed for a majority
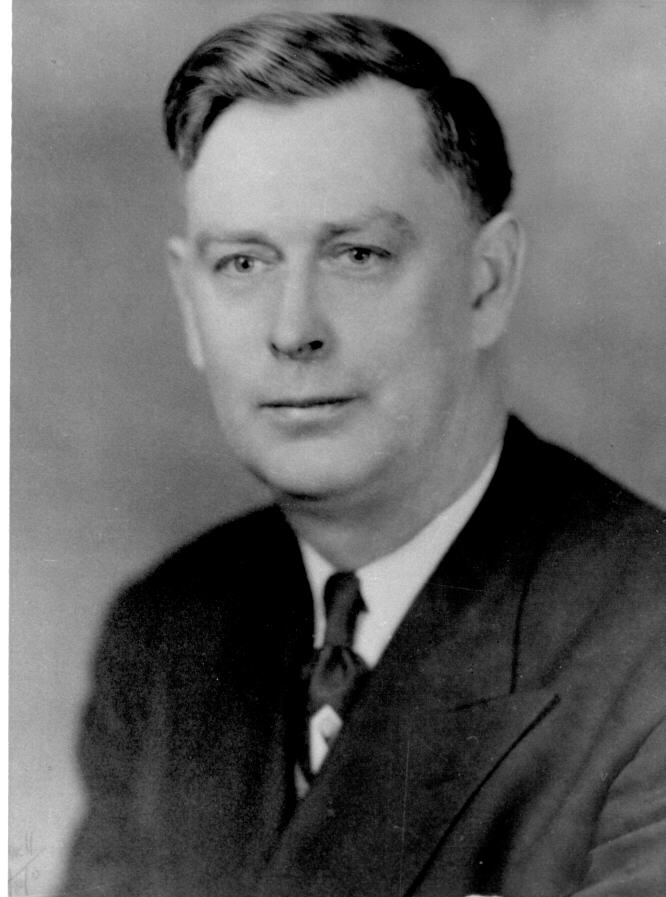
	First party	Second party
		PC
Leader	Alex W. Matheson	Reginald Bell
Party	Liberal	Progressive Conservative
Leader since	1953	1950
Leader's seat	4th Kings	2nd Queens
Last election	24 seats, 51.6%	6 seats, 46.7%
Seats won	27	3
Seat change	▲3	▼3
Popular vote	44,918	36,705
Percentage	55.0%	45.0%
Swing	▲3.4pp	▼1.7pp
Premier before election
Alex W. Matheson
Liberal
Premier after election
Alex W. Matheson
Liberal

The 1955 Prince Edward Island general election was held in the Canadian province of Prince Edward Island on May 25, 1955.

The governing Liberals of Premier Alex W. Matheson increased their majority in the Legislature, winning three more seats over the opposition Progressive Conservatives led by Reginald Bell, who would resign as leader in 1957 following this election. Matheson took over as premier from his predecessor J. Walter Jones in May 1953 following his appointment to the Senate.

This election marked the first and only time (as of 2016) that a party has won six consecutive general elections on Prince Edward Island.

== Party Standings ==
↓
27	3
Liberal	PC

Party	Party Leader	Seats			Popular Vote		
Party	Party Leader	1951	Elected	Change	#	%	Change
Liberal	Alex W. Matheson	24	27	+3	44,918	55.0%	+3.4%
Progressive Conservative	Reginald Bell	6	3	-3	36,705	45.0%	-1.7%

Popular vote
Liberal	55.03%
PC	44.97%

Seats summary
Liberal	90.00%
PC	10.00%

== Members Elected ==
The Legislature of Prince Edward Island had two levels of membership from 1893 to 1996 - Assemblymen and Councillors. This was a holdover from when the Island had a bicameral legislature, the General Assembly and the Legislative Council.

In 1893, the Legislative Council was abolished and had its membership merged with the Assembly, though the two titles remained separate and were elected by different electoral franchises. Assembleymen were elected by all eligible voters of within a district, while Councillors were only elected by landowners within a district.

=== Kings ===
District	Assemblyman	Party	Councillor	Party
1st Kings	William Acorn	Liberal	Brenton St. John	Liberal
2nd Kings	Harvey Douglas	Liberal	Leo Rossiter	Progressive; Conservative
3rd Kings	Joseph Campbell	Liberal	Keir Clark	Liberal
4th Kings	Lorne Bonnell	Liberal	Alexander Wallace Matheson	Liberal
5th Kings	Stephen Hessian	Liberal	George Saville	Liberal

=== Queens ===
District	Assemblyman	Party	Councillor	Party
1st Queens	Frederic Large	Liberal	W. F. Alan Stewart	Liberal Progressive; Conservative
2nd Queens	George Kitson	Liberal	Reginald Bell	Progressive; Conservative
3rd Queens	Russell C. Clark	Liberal	Eugene Cullen	Liberal
4th Queens	Dougald MacKinnon	Liberal	Harold P. Smith	Liberal
5th Queens	Earle MacDonald	Liberal	Alex MacIsaac	Liberal

=== Prince ===
District	Assemblyman	Party	Councillor	Party
1st Prince	Prosper Arsenault	Liberal	Fred Ramsay	Liberal
2nd Prince	George Dewar	Progressive; Conservative	Forrest Phillips	Liberal
3rd Prince	Augustin Gallant	Liberal	Frank MacNutt	Liberal
4th Prince	J. George MacKay	Liberal	Cleveland Baker	Liberal
5th Prince	Edward P. Foley	Liberal	Morley Bell	Liberal
