= List of premiers of Prince Edward Island =

Premier of Prince Edward Island
- Coat of arms of Prince Edward Island

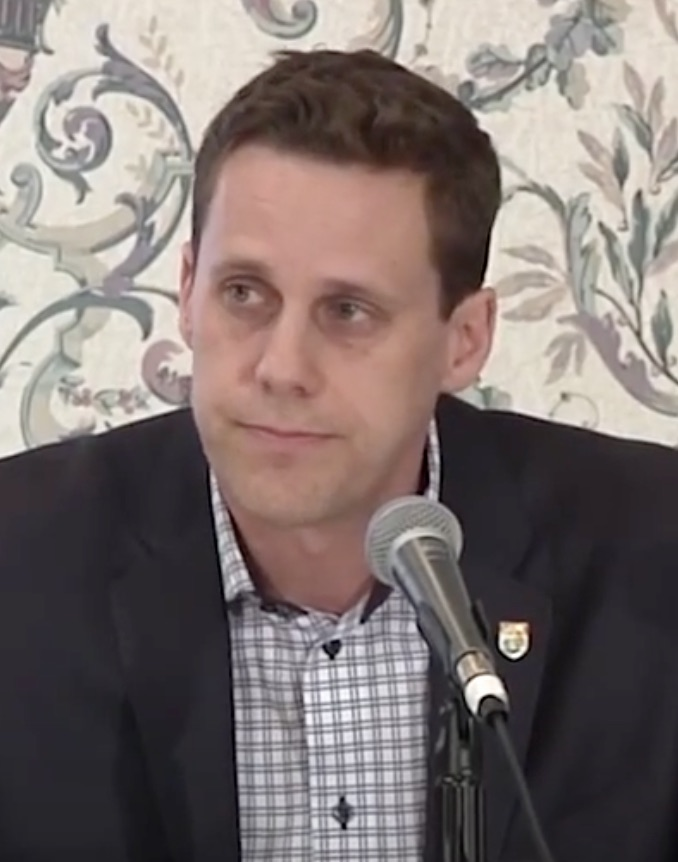
- Incumbent; Rob Lantz since February 9, 2026
- Government of Prince Edward Island; Office of the Premier
- Style: The Honourable
- Member of: Executive Council
- Reports to: Legislative Assembly
- Seat: Charlottetown
- Appointer: Lieutenant Governor of Prince Edward Island
- Term length: At His Majesty's pleasure
- Formation: 1873
- Salary: $68,721 plus $74,634 (indemnity and allowances)

The premier of Prince Edward Island is the first minister for the Canadian province of Prince Edward Island. They are the province's head of government and de facto chief executive.

Prince Edward Island was a British crown colony before it joined Canadian Confederation in 1873. It has had a system of responsible government since 1851, and the province kept its own legislature to deal with provincial matters after joining Confederation. Prince Edward Island has a unicameral Westminster-style parliamentary government, in which the premier is the leader of the party that controls the most seats in the Legislative Assembly. The premier is Prince Edward Island's head of government, and the king of Canada is its head of state and is represented by the lieutenant governor of Prince Edward Island. The premier picks a cabinet from the elected members to form the Executive Council of Prince Edward Island, and presides over that body.

Members are first elected to the legislature during general elections. General elections must be conducted every five years from the date of the last election, but the premier may ask for early dissolution of the Legislative Assembly. An election may also take place if the governing party loses the confidence of the legislature by the defeat of a supply bill or tabling of a confidence motion.

Prince Edward Island has had 46 government leaders since it became a colony in 1851. The province had 7 premiers while a colony and 34 premiers after joining Confederation, of which 18 were from the Prince Edward Island Progressive Conservative Party and 23 were from the Prince Edward Island Liberal Party.

The current premier is Rob Lantz, since February 9, 2026.

== List of premiers of Prince Edward Island ==
No.	Portrait	Name (Birth–Death)	Term of office	Electoral mandates (Assembly)	Political party	Parliamentary seat	Ref.
Premiers of the Colony of Prince Edward Island
1 (1 of 3)		George Coles (1810–1875)	24 April 1851 – 1854	Title created (18th Leg.) 1853 election (19th Leg.)	Liberal (Ldr. 1851)	MHA for 1st Queens	
2		John Holl (1802–1869)	1854 – 1855	Appointment (19th Leg.)	Conservative (Ldr. 1854)	Councillor for colony-at-large	
— (2 of 3)		George Coles (1810–1875)	1855 – 1859	1854 election (20th Leg.)	Liberal (Ldr. 1851)	MHA for 1st Queens	
3		Edward Palmer (1809–1889)	1859 – 2 March 1863	1859 election (21st Leg.)	Conservative (Ldr. 1855)	MHA for 5th Queens (Councillor after 1860)	
4		John Hamilton Gray (1811–1887)	2 March 1863 – 7 January 1865	1863 election (22nd Leg.)	Conservative (Ldr. 1863)	MHA for 4th Queens	
5 (1 of 3)		J. C. Pope (1826–1885)	7 January 1865 – 14 March 1867	Appointment (22nd Leg.)	Conservative (Ldr. 1865)	MHA for 3rd Prince	
— (3 of 3)		George Coles (1810–1875)	14 March 1867 – c. late 1868	1867 election (23rd Leg.)	Liberal (Ldr. 1851)	MHA for 1st Queens	
6		Joseph Hensley (1824–1894)	c. late 1868 – July; 1869	Appointment (23rd Leg.)	Liberal (Ldr. 1869)	MHA for 1st Kings	
7 (1 of 2)		R. P. Haythorne (1815–1891)	1869 – 10 September 1870	Appointment (23rd Leg.) 1870 election (24th Leg.)	Liberal (Ldr. 1869)	Councillor for 2nd Queens	
— (2 of 3)		J. C. Pope (1826–1885)	10 September 1870 – 1872	Appointment (24th Leg.)	Conservative (Ldr. 1865)	MHA for 4th Prince	
— (2 of 2)		R. P. Haythorne (1815–1891)	1872 – April; 1873	1872 election (25th Leg.)	Liberal (Ldr. 1869)	Councillor for 2nd Queens	
— (3 of 3)		J. C. Pope (1826–1885)	April; 1873 – 1 July 1873	1873 election (26th Leg.)	Conservative (Ldr. 1865)	MHA for 5th Queens	
Premiers of the province of Prince Edward Island
1		J. C. Pope (1826–1885)	1 July 1873 – September; 1873	Title created (26th Leg.)	Conservative (Ldr. 1865)	MHA for 5th Queens	
2		L. C. Owen (1822–1912)	September; 1873 – August; 1876	Appointment (26th Leg.)	Conservative (Ldr. 1873)	MHA for 3rd Kings	
3		Louis Henry Davies (1845–1924)	August; 1876 – 25 April 1879	1876 election (27th Leg.)	Liberal (Ldr. 1876)	MHA for 5th Queens	
4		William Wilfred Sullivan (1839–1920)	25 April 1879 – 1 November 1889	1879 election (28th Leg.) 1882 election (29th Leg.) 1886 election (30th Leg.)	Conservative (Ldr. 1877)	MHA for 2nd Kings	
5		Neil McLeod (1842–1915)	1 November 1889 – 27 April 1891	Appointment (30th Leg.) 1890 election (31st Leg.)	Conservative (Ldr. 1889)	MHA for 5th Queens	
6		Frederick Peters (1851–1919)	27 April 1891 – 1 October 1897	Appointment (31st Leg.) 1893 election (32nd Leg.)	Liberal (Ldr. 1891)	MHA for 3rd Queens (Assemblyman after 1893)	
7		Alexander B. Warburton (1852–1929)	1 October 1897 – 1 August 1898	1897 election (33rd Leg.)	Liberal (Ldr. 1897)	Councillor for 1st Queens	
8		Donald Farquharson (1834–1903)	1 August 1898 – 29 December 1901	Appointment (33rd Leg.) 1900 election (34th Leg.)	Liberal (Ldr. 1898)	Councillor for 2nd Queens	
9		Arthur Peters (1854–1908)	29 December 1901 – 29 January 1908	Appointment (34th Leg.) 1904 election (35th Leg.)	Liberal (Ldr. 1901)	Assemblyman for 2nd Kings	
10		Francis Haszard (1849–1938)	1 February 1908 – 16 May 1911	Appointment (35th Leg.) 1908 election (36th Leg.)	Liberal (Ldr. 1908)	Councillor for 4th Queens	
11		H. James Palmer (1851–1939)	16 May 1911 – 2 December 1911	Appointment (36th Leg.)	Liberal (Ldr. 1911)	Assemblyman for 3rd Queens	
12		John A. Mathieson (1863–1947)	2 December 1911 – 21 June 1917	Appointment (36th Leg.) 1912 election (37th Leg.) 1915 election (38th Leg.)	Conservative (Ldr. 1903)	Councillor for 5th Kings	
13		Aubin-Edmond Arsenault (1870–1968)	21 June 1917 – 9 September 1919	Appointment (38th Leg.)	Conservative (Ldr. 1917)	Assemblyman for 3rd Prince	
14		John Howatt Bell (1846–1929)	9 September 1919 – 5 September 1923	1919 election (39th Leg.)	Liberal (Ldr. 1915)	Assemblyman for 4th Prince	
15 (1 of 2)		James D. Stewart (1874–1933)	5 September 1923 – 12 August 1927	1923 election (40th Leg.)	Conservative (Ldr. 1921)	Councillor for 5th Kings	
16		Albert C. Saunders (1874–1943)	12 August 1927 – 20 May 1930	1927 election (41st Leg.)	Liberal (Ldr. 1923)	Assemblyman for 1st Prince	
17 (1 of 2)		Walter M. Lea (1874–1936)	20 May 1930 – 29 August 1931	Appointment (41st Leg.)	Liberal (Ldr. 1930)	Councillor for 4th Prince	
— (2 of 2)		James D. Stewart (1874–1933)	29 August 1931 – 10 October 1933	1931 election (42nd Leg.)	Conservative (Ldr. 1921)	Councillor for 5th Kings	
18		William J. P. MacMillan (1881–1957)	14 October 1933 – 15 August 1935	Appointment (42nd Leg.)	Conservative (Ldr. 1933)	Councillor for 5th Queens	
— (2 of 2)		Walter M. Lea (1874–1936)	15 August 1935 – 10 January 1936	1935 election (43rd Leg.)	Liberal (Ldr. 1930)	Councillor for 4th Prince	
19		Thane A. Campbell (1895–1978)	14 January 1936 – 11 May 1943	Appointment (43rd Leg.) 1939 election (44th Leg.)	Liberal (Ldr. 1936)	Councillor for 1st Prince	
20		J. Walter Jones (1878–1954)	11 May 1943 – 25 May 1953	Appointment (44th Leg.) 1943 election (45th Leg.) 1947 election (46th Leg.) 1951 election (47th Leg.)	Liberal (Ldr. 1943)	Councillor for 4th Queens	
21		Alexander W. Matheson (1903–1976)	25 May 1953 – 16 September 1959	Appointment (47th Leg.) 1955 election (48th Leg.)	Liberal (Ldr. 1953)	Councillor for 4th Kings	
22		Walter R. Shaw (1887–1981)	16 September 1959 – 28 July 1966	1959 election (49th Leg.) 1962 election (50th Leg.)	Progressive Conservative (Ldr. 1957)	Councillor for 1st Queens	
23		Alexander B. Campbell (b. 1933)	28 July 1966 – 18 September 1978	1966 election (51st Leg.) 1970 election (52nd Leg.) 1974 election (53rd Leg.) 1978 election (54th Leg.)	Liberal (Ldr. 1965)	Councillor for 5th Prince	
24		W. Bennett Campbell (1943–2008)	18 September 1978 – 3 May 1979	Appointment (54th Leg.)	Liberal (Ldr. 1978)	Assemblyman for 3rd Kings	
25		J. Angus MacLean (1914–2000)	3 May 1979 – 17 November 1981	1979 election (55th Leg.)	Progressive Conservative (Ldr. 1976)	Assemblyman for 4th Queens	
26		Jim Lee (1937–2023)	17 November 1981 – 2 May 1986	Appointment (55th Leg.) 1982 election (56th Leg.)	Progressive Conservative (Ldr. 1981)	Assemblyman for 5th Queens	
27		Joe Ghiz (1945–1996)	2 May 1986 – 25 January 1993	1986 election (57th Leg.) 1989 election (58th Leg.)	Liberal (Ldr. 1981)	Assemblyman for 6th Queens	
28		Catherine Callbeck (b. 1939)	25 January 1993 – 10 October 1996	Appointment (58th Leg.) 1993 election (59th Leg.)	Liberal (Ldr. 1993)	Councillor for 1st Queens	
29		Keith Milligan (b. 1950)	10 October 1996 – 27 November 1996	Appointment (59th Leg.)	Liberal (Ldr. 1996)	Assemblyman for 2nd Prince	
30		Pat Binns (b. 1948)	27 November 1996 – 13 June 2007	1996 election (60th Leg.) 2000 election (61st Leg.) 2003 election (62nd Leg.)	Progressive Conservative (Ldr. 1996)	MLA for Murray River-Gaspereaux	
31		Robert Ghiz (b. 1974)	13 June 2007 – 23 February 2015	2007 election (63rd Leg.) 2011 election (64th Leg.)	Liberal (Ldr. 2003)	MLA for Charlottetown-Brighton	
32		Wade H. MacLauchlan (b. 1954)	23 February 2015 – 9 May 2019	Appointment (64th Leg.) 2015 election (65th Leg.)	Liberal (Ldr. 2015)	MLA for York-Oyster Bed	
33		Dennis King (b. 1971)	9 May 2019 – 21 February 2025	2019 election (66th Leg.) 2023 election (67th Leg.)	Progressive Conservative (Ldr. 2019)	MLA for Brackley-Hunter River	
34 (1 of 2)		Rob Lantz (b. 1970)	21 February 2025 – 12 December 2025	Appointment (67th Leg.)	Progressive Conservative (Ldr. 2025; interim)	MLA for Charlottetown-Brighton	
35		Bloyce Thompson	12 December 2025 – 9 February 2026	Appointment (67th Leg.)	Progressive Conservative (Ldr. 2025; interim)	MLA for Stanhope-Marshfield	
— (2 of 2)		Rob Lantz (b. 1970)	9 February 2026 – incumbent	Appointment (67th Leg.)	Progressive Conservative (Ldr. 2026)	MLA for Charlottetown-Brighton	

== See also ==
- Leader of the Opposition (Prince Edward Island)
