= 1951 Prince Edward Island general election =

Canadian provincial election

← 1947	April 26, 1951	1955 →

All 30 seats in the Legislative Assembly of Prince Edward Island 16 seats needed for a majority
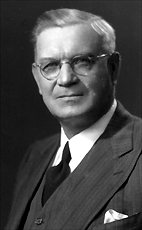
	First party	Second party
		PC
Leader	J. Walter Jones	Reginald Bell
Party	Liberal	Progressive Conservative
Leader since	1943	1950
Leader's seat	4th Queens	2nd Queens
Last election	24 seats, 50.3%	6 seats, 45.3%
Seats won	24	6
Seat change	Steady	Steady
Popular vote	40,847	36,921
Percentage	51.6%	46.7%
Swing	▲1.3pp	▲1.4pp
Premier before election
J. Walter Jones
Liberal
Premier after election
J. Walter Jones
Liberal

The 1951 Prince Edward Island general election was held in the Canadian province of Prince Edward Island on April 26, 1951.

The governing Liberals of Premier J. Walter Jones held on to their majority in the Legislature over the opposition Progressive Conservatives led by Reginald Bell, who was elected leader of the party in 1950. Both parties kept the same number of seats they earned in the previous election, though eight seats did change hands.

The democratic socialist Co-operative Commonwealth Federation fell back from their previous high in 1947, losing over half of their vote. This would be the last election contested by the CCF or any third party in provincial PEI elections until the CCF's successor, the New Democratic Party, ran in by-elections in 1972.

This election featured the first female candidate for office, Hilda Ramsay, who came in third while running for the CCF as Councillor in 3rd Prince.

== Party Standings ==
↓
24	6
Liberal	PC

Party	Party Leader	Seats			Popular Vote		
Party	Party Leader	1947	Elected	Change	#	%	Change
Liberal	J. Walter Jones	24	24	±0	40,847	51.6%	+1.3%
Progressive Conservative	Reginald Bell	6	6	±0	36,921	46.7%	+1.4%
Co-operative Commonwealth		-	-	-	1,336	1.7%	-2.6%

Popular vote
Liberal	51.64%
PC	46.67%
CCF	1.69%

Seats summary
Liberal	80.00%
PC	20.00%

== Members elected ==
The Legislature of Prince Edward Island had two levels of membership from 1893 to 1996 - Assemblymen and Councillors. This was a holdover from when the Island had a bicameral legislature, the General Assembly and the Legislative Council.

In 1893, the Legislative Council was abolished and had its membership merged with the Assembly, though the two titles remained separate and were elected by different electoral franchises. Assembleymen were elected by all eligible voters of within a district, while Councillors were only elected by landowners within a district.

=== Kings ===
District	Assemblyman	Party	Councillor	Party
1st Kings	William Acorn	Liberal	Brenton St. John	Liberal
2nd Kings	Harvey Douglas	Liberal	Thomas R. Cullen	Liberal
3rd Kings	John A. MacDonald	Progressive; Conservative	Keir Clark	Liberal
4th Kings	Lorne Bonnell	Liberal	Alexander Wallace Matheson	Liberal
5th Kings	William Hughes	Liberal	George Saville	Liberal

=== Queens ===
District	Assemblyman	Party	Councillor	Party
1st Queens	Frank Myers	Progressive; Conservative	W. F. Alan Stewart	Liberal
2nd Queens	George Kitson	Liberal	Reginald Bell	Progressive; Conservative
3rd Queens	Russell C. Clark	Liberal	Eugene Cullen	Liberal
4th Queens	Dougald MacKinnon	Liberal	John Walter Jones	Liberal
5th Queens	Earle MacDonald	Liberal	William J. P. MacMillan	Progressive; Conservative

=== Prince ===
District	Assemblyman	Party	Councillor	Party
1st Prince	Hubert Gaudet	Progressive; Conservative	Don Campbell	Progressive; Conservative
2nd Prince	Walter Darby	Liberal	Forrest Phillips	Liberal
3rd Prince	J. Wilfred Arsenault	Liberal	Frank MacNutt	Liberal
4th Prince	J. George MacKay	Liberal	Cleveland Baker	Liberal
5th Prince	Edward P. Foley	Liberal	Lorne H. MacFarlane	Liberal
