= 48th General Assembly of Prince Edward Island =

General assembly of Edward Island

The 48th General Assembly of Prince Edward Island was in session from February 21, 1956, to August 3, 1959. The Liberal Party led by Alexander Wallace Matheson formed the government.

Augustin Gallant was elected speaker. Edward Foley replaced Gallant as speaker in 1959.

There were four sessions of the 48th General Assembly:

Session	Start	End
1st	February 21, 1956	March 29, 1956
2nd	February 26, 1957	April 18, 1957
3rd	March 11, 1958	April 12, 1958
4th	February 10, 1959	March 25, 1959

== Members ==
=== Kings ===
District	Assemblyman	Party	First elected / previously elected
1st Kings	William Acorn	Liberal	1951
2nd Kings	Harvey Douglas	Liberal	1950
3rd Kings	Joseph Campbell	Liberal	1947, 1955
4th Kings	Lorne Bonnell	Liberal	1951
5th Kings	Stephen Hessian	Liberal	1919, (Note: Assemblyman) 1935, 1955
District	Councillor	Party	First elected / previously elected
1st Kings	Brenton St. John	Liberal	1949
2nd Kings	Leo Rossiter	Progressive; Conservative	1955
3rd Kings	Keir Clark	Liberal	1947
4th Kings	Alexander Wallace Matheson	Liberal	1940, (Note: 2nd Queens (Assemblyman)) 1947
5th Kings	George Saville	Liberal	1935

=== Prince ===
District	Assemblyman	Party	First elected / previously elected
1st Prince	Prosper Arsenault	Liberal	1955
2nd Prince	George Dewar	Progressive; Conservative	1955
3rd Prince	Augustin Gallant	Liberal	1954
4th Prince	J. George MacKay	Liberal	1949
5th Prince	Edward P. Foley	Liberal	1935, 1951
District	Councillor	Party	First elected / previously elected
1st Prince	Fred Ramsay	Liberal	1943, 1955
2nd Prince	Forrest Phillips	Liberal	1946
3rd Prince	Frank MacNutt	Liberal	1951
4th Prince	Cleveland Baker	Liberal	1935, 1947
5th Prince	Morley Bell	Liberal	1945, 1955

=== Queens ===
District	Assemblyman	Party	First elected / previously elected
1st Queens	Frederic Large	Liberal	1947, 1955
2nd Queens	George Kitson	Liberal	1940, 1951
3rd Queens	Russell C. Clark	Liberal	1927, 1935
4th Queens	Dougald MacKinnon	Liberal	1935
5th Queens	Earle MacDonald	Liberal	1951
District	Councillor	Party	First elected / previously elected
1st Queens	W. F. Alan Stewart (Note: died in 1956)	Liberal	1927, 1935
1st Queens	Frank Myers (1957)	Progressive; Conservative	1951, 1957
2nd Queens	Reginald Bell	Progressive; Conservative	1943
3rd Queens	Eugene Cullen	Liberal	1944
4th Queens	Harold P. Smith	Liberal	1953
5th Queens	Alex MacIsaac	Liberal	1955
