= 47th General Assembly of Prince Edward Island =

The 47th General Assembly of Prince Edward Island was in session from October 23, 1951, to April 27, 1955. The Liberal Party led by John Walter Jones formed the government. Alexander Wallace Matheson replaced Jones as Premier and party leader in 1953.

Forest W. Phillips was elected speaker.

There were five sessions of the 47th General Assembly:

Session	Start	End
1st	October 23, 1951	October 24, 1951
2nd	March 11, 1952	April 9, 1952
3rd	March 3, 1953	April 7, 1953
4th	March 2, 1954	April 10, 1954
5th	February 8, 1955	March 18, 1955

== Members ==
=== Kings ===
District	Assemblyman	Party	First elected / previously elected
1st Kings	William Acorn	Liberal	1951
2nd Kings	Harvey Douglas	Liberal	1950
3rd Kings	John A. MacDonald	Progressive; Conservative	1945, 1951
4th Kings	Lorne Bonnell	Liberal	1951
5th Kings	William Hughes	Liberal	1935
District	Councillor	Party	First elected / previously elected
1st Kings	Brenton St. John	Liberal	1949
2nd Kings	Thomas R. Cullen	Liberal	1943, 1951
3rd Kings	Keir Clark	Liberal	1947
4th Kings	Alexander Wallace Matheson	Liberal	1940, (Note: 2nd Queens (Assemblyman)) 1947
5th Kings	George Saville	Liberal	1935

=== Prince ===
District	Assemblyman	Party	First elected / previously elected
1st Prince	Hubert Gaudet	Progressive; Conservative	1951
2nd Prince	Walter Darby	Liberal	1949
3rd Prince	J. Wilfred Arsenault (Note: resigned)	Liberal	1947
3rd Prince	Augustin Gallant (1954)	Liberal	1954
4th Prince	J. George MacKay	Liberal	1949
5th Prince	Edward P. Foley	Liberal	1935, 1951
District	Councillor	Party	First elected / previously elected
1st Prince	Don Campbell	Progressive; Conservative	1951
2nd Prince	Forrest Phillips	Liberal	1946
3rd Prince	Frank MacNutt	Liberal	1951
4th Prince	Cleveland Baker	Liberal	1935, 1947
5th Prince	Lorne H. MacFarlane	Liberal	1947

=== Queens ===
District	Assemblyman	Party	First elected / previously elected
1st Queens	Frank Myers	Progressive; Conservative	1951
2nd Queens	George Kitson	Liberal	1940, 1951
3rd Queens	Russell C. Clark	Liberal	1927, 1935
4th Queens	Dougald MacKinnon	Liberal	1935
5th Queens	Earle MacDonald	Liberal	1951
District	Councillor	Party	First elected / previously elected
1st Queens	W. F. Alan Stewart	Liberal	1927, 1935
2nd Queens	Reginald Bell	Progressive; Conservative	1943
3rd Queens	Eugene Cullen	Liberal	1944
4th Queens	John Walter Jones (Note: named to Senate)	Liberal	1935
4th Queens	Harold P. Smith (1953)	Liberal	1953
5th Queens	William J. P. MacMillan	Progressive; Conservative	1923, 1939
