= 43rd General Assembly of Prince Edward Island =

- Majority parliament
- September 25, 1935 – April 21, 1939

Parliament leaders
- Premier: Walter Lea; August 15, 1935 – January 10, 1936
- Thane Campbell; January 14, 1936 – May 11, 1943

Party caucuses
- Government: Liberal Party
- Opposition: Liberal Party shadow cabinet*
- * The Liberal Party won every seat in the Assembly, so Premier Lea named several members of his own caucus to act as an opposition.

Legislative Assembly
- Speaker of the Assembly: Stephen Hessian
- Members: 15 MLA seats
- Counsellors: 15 counsellor seats

Sovereign
- Monarch: George V 6 May 1910 – 20 Jan. 1936
- Edward VIII; 20 Jan. 1936 – 11 Dec. 1936
- 11 Dec. 1936 – 6 Feb. 1952
- Lieutenant Governor: George Des Brisay de Blois; December 28, 1933 – October 1, 1939

Sessions
- 1st session September 25, 1935 – September 25, 1935
- 2nd session March 30, 1936 – April 18, 1936
- 3rd session April 16, 1937 – March 22, 1937
- 4th session April 22, 1938 – March 28, 1938
- 5th session April 20, 1939 – March 20, 1939
| ← 42nd | → 44th |

The 43rd General Assembly of Prince Edward Island was in session from September 25, 1935, to April 21, 1939. The Liberal Party led by Walter Lea formed the government, winning all the seats in the legislature. Thane Campbell became Premier and party leader following Lea's death in 1936.

Stephen Hessian was elected speaker.

There were five sessions of the 43rd General Assembly:

| Session | Start | End |
|---|---|---|
| 1st | September 25, 1935 | September 25, 1935 |
| 2nd | March 30, 1936 | April 18, 1936 |
| 3rd | March 22, 1937 | April 16, 1937 |
| 4th | March 28, 1938 | April 22, 1938 |
| 5th | March 20, 1939 | April 20, 1939 |

== Members ==
=== Kings ===
| District | Assemblyman | Party | First elected / previously elected |
|---|---|---|---|
| 1st Kings | Peter A. MacIsaac | Liberal | 1935 |
| 2nd Kings | Harry Cox | Liberal | 1927 |
| 3rd Kings | John Mustard | Liberal | 1927, 1935 |
| 4th Kings | John A. Campbell | Liberal | 1927 |
| 5th Kings | William Hughes | Liberal | 1935 |
| District | Councillor | Party | First elected / previously elected |
| 1st Kings | Herbert H. Acorn | Liberal | 1935 |
| 2nd Kings | James P. McIntyre | Liberal | 1919, 1927 |
| 3rd Kings | Stephen Hessian | Liberal | 1919, 1935 |
| 4th Kings | Montague Annear | Liberal | 1931 |
| 5th Kings | George Saville | Liberal | 1935 |

=== Prince ===
| District | Assemblyman | Party | First elected / previously elected |
|---|---|---|---|
| 1st Prince | Aeneas Gallant | Liberal | 1931 |
| 2nd Prince | George H. Barbour | Liberal | 1935 |
| 3rd Prince | Marin Gallant | Liberal | 1935 |
| 4th Prince | Cleveland Baker | Liberal | 1935 |
| 5th Prince | Edward P. Foley | Liberal | 1935 |
| District | Councillor | Party | First elected / previously elected |
| 1st Prince | Thane Alexander Campbell | Liberal | 1931 |
| 2nd Prince | William H. Dennis | Liberal | 1915 |
| 3rd Prince | Thomas Linkletter | Liberal | 1935 |
| 4th Prince | Walter Lea (Note: died in 1936) | Liberal | 1915, 1927 |
| 4th Prince | Horace Wright (1936) | Liberal | 1927, (Note: Assemblyman) 1936 |
| 5th Prince | Lucas R. Allan | Liberal | 1927 |

=== Queens ===
| District | Assemblyman | Party | First elected / previously elected |
|---|---|---|---|
| 1st Queens | Donald N. McKay | Liberal | 1935 |
| 2nd Queens | Angus McPhee | Liberal | 1927, 1935 |
| 3rd Queens | Russell C. Clark | Liberal | 1927, 1935 |
| 4th Queens | Dougald MacKinnon | Liberal | 1935 |
| 5th Queens | T. William L. Prowse | Liberal | 1935 |
| District | Councillor | Party | First elected / previously elected |
| 1st Queens | W. F. Alan Stewart | Liberal | 1927, 1935 |
| 2nd Queens | Bradford W. LePage | Liberal | 1919, 1927 |
| 3rd Queens | Mark R. MacGuigan | Liberal | 1935 |
| 4th Queens | John Walter Jones | Liberal | 1935 |
| 5th Queens | C. St. Clair Trainor | Liberal | 1935 |
