= 44th General Assembly of Prince Edward Island =

The 44th General Assembly of Prince Edward Island was in session from March 2, 1940, to August 20, 1943. The Liberal Party led by Thane Campbell formed the government. John Walter Jones became premier and party leader in May 1943 after Campbell accepted an appointment as a judge.

Walter F. Alan Stewart was elected speaker.

There were four sessions of the 44th General Assembly:

Session	Start	End
1st	March 20, 1940	May 2, 1940
2nd	March 24, 1941	April 10, 1941
3rd	March 16, 1942	April 2, 1942
4th	March 5, 1943	April 2, 1943

== Members ==
=== Kings ===
District	Assemblyman	Party	First elected / previously elected
1st Kings	Herbert H. Acorn	Liberal	1935
1st Kings	John R. McLean (1940)	Conservative/ Prog. Conservative	1940
2nd Kings	Harry Cox	Liberal	1927
3rd Kings	John Mustard	Liberal	1927, 1935
4th Kings	John A. Campbell	Liberal	1927
5th Kings	William Hughes	Liberal	1935
District	Councillor	Party	First elected / previously elected
1st Kings	Peter A. MacIsaac	Liberal	1935
2nd Kings	James P. McIntyre	Liberal	1919, 1927
3rd Kings	Francis MacPhee	Conservative/ Prog. Conservative	1926, 1931, 1939
4th Kings	Montague Annear	Liberal	1931
5th Kings	George Saville	Liberal	1935

=== Prince ===
District	Assemblyman	Party	First elected / previously elected
1st Prince	Aeneas Gallant	Liberal	1931
2nd Prince	George H. Barbour	Liberal	1935
3rd Prince	Marin Gallant	Liberal	1935
4th Prince	Cleveland Baker	Liberal	1935
5th Prince	Edward P. Foley	Liberal	1935
District	Councillor	Party	First elected / previously elected
1st Prince	Thane Alexander Campbell	Liberal	1931
2nd Prince	William H. Dennis	Liberal	1915
3rd Prince	Thomas Linkletter	Liberal	1935
4th Prince	Horace Wright	Liberal	1927, (Note: Assemblyman) 1936
5th Prince	Brewer W. Robinson	Liberal	1939

=== Queens ===
District	Assemblyman	Party	First elected / previously elected
1st Queens	Donald N. McKay	Liberal	1935
2nd Queens	Angus McPhee	Liberal	1927, 1935
2nd Queens	George Kitson	Liberal	1940
3rd Queens	Russell C. Clark	Liberal	1927, 1935
4th Queens	Dougald MacKinnon	Liberal	1935
5th Queens	William Allan Stewart	Conservative/ Prog. Conservative	1931, 1939
District	Councillor	Party	First elected / previously elected
1st Queens	W. F. Alan Stewart	Liberal	1927, 1935
2nd Queens	Bradford W. LePage	Liberal	1919, 1927
2nd Queens	Alexander W. Matheson (1940)	Liberal	1940
3rd Queens	Mark R. MacGuigan	Liberal	1935
4th Queens	John Walter Jones	Liberal	1935
5th Queens	William J. P. MacMillan	Conservative/ Prog. Conservative	1923, 1939
