= 1959 Prince Edward Island general election =

Canadian provincial election

- September 1, 1959

All 30 seats in the Legislative Assembly of Prince Edward Island 16 seats needed for a majority
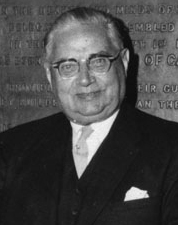

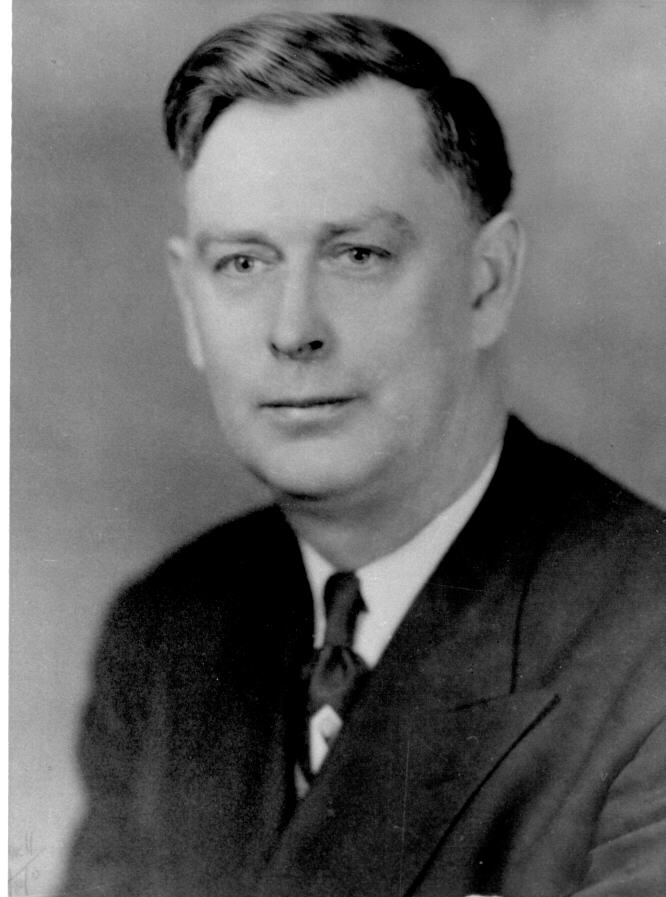
| | First party | Second party |
|---|---|---|
| Leader | Walter R. Shaw | Alex W. Matheson |
| Party | Progressive Conservative | Liberal |
| Leader since | 1957 | 1953 |
| Leader's seat | 1st Queens | 4th Kings |
| Last election | 3 seats, 45.0% | 27 seats, 55.0% |
| Seats won | 22 | 8 |
| Seat change | ▲19 | ▼19 |
| Popular vote | 43,845 | 42,214 |
| Percentage | 50.9% | 49.1% |
| Swing | ▲5.9pp | ▼5.9pp |
Premier before election
Alex W. Matheson
Liberal
Premier after election
Walter R. Shaw
Progressive Conservative

The 1959 Prince Edward Island general election was held in the Canadian province of Prince Edward Island on September 1, 1959.

The governing Liberals of Premier Alex W. Matheson were defeated by the Progressive Conservatives led by Walter R. Shaw, who gained a massive number of districts across the Island to earn a majority government, despite a close result in the popular vote.

The defeat of the Matheson-led Liberals marked the end of the longest serving government in Island history. The Liberals had governed for 24 straight years since their initial victory in the 1935 general election, a feat that would not be rivaled by any other provincial government on the Island.

== Party standings ==
↓
| 22 | 8 |
| PC | Liberal |

| Party | Party Leader | Seats | | | Popular Vote | | |
| Party | Party Leader | 1955 | Elected | Change | # | % | Change |
|---|---|---|---|---|---|---|---|
| Progressive Conservative | Walter R. Shaw | 3 | 22 | +19 | 43,845 | 50.9% | +5.9% |
| Liberal | Alex W. Matheson | 27 | 8 | -19 | 42,214 | 49.1% | -5.9% |

Popular vote
| PC | 50.95% |
| Liberal | 49.05% |

Seats summary
| PC | 73.33% |
| Liberal | 26.67% |

== Members elected ==
The Legislature of Prince Edward Island had two levels of membership from 1893 to 1996 - Assemblymen and Councillors. This was a holdover from when the Island had a bicameral legislature, the General Assembly and the Legislative Council.

In 1893, the Legislative Council was abolished and had its membership merged with the Assembly, though the two titles remained separate and were elected by different electoral franchises. Assembleymen were elected by all eligible voters of within a district, while Councillors were only elected by landowners within a district.

=== Kings ===
| District | Assemblyman | Party | Councillor | Party |
|---|---|---|---|---|
| 1st Kings | John R. McLean | Progressive; Conservative | Melvin J. McQuaid | Progressive; Conservative |
| 2nd Kings | Walter Dingwell | Progressive; Conservative | Leo Rossiter | Progressive; Conservative |
| 3rd Kings | Thomas A. Curran | Progressive; Conservative | Douglas McGowan | Progressive; Conservative |
| 4th Kings | Lorne Bonnell | Liberal | Alexander Wallace Matheson | Liberal |
| 5th Kings | Stephen Hessian | Liberal | George Saville | Liberal |

=== Queens ===
| District | Assemblyman | Party | Councillor | Party |
|---|---|---|---|---|
| 1st Queens | Frank Myers | Progressive; Conservative | Walter Russell Shaw | Progressive; Conservative |
| 2nd Queens | Philip Matheson | Progressive; Conservative | Reginald Bell | Progressive; Conservative |
| 3rd Queens | Andrew B. MacRae | Progressive; Conservative | J. Russell Driscoll | Progressive; Conservative |
| 4th Queens | J. Stewart Ross | Liberal | Harold P. Smith | Liberal |
| 5th Queens | J. David Stewart | Progressive; Conservative | Alban Farmer | Progressive; Conservative |

=== Prince ===
| District | Assemblyman | Party | Councillor | Party |
|---|---|---|---|---|
| 1st Prince | Hubert Gaudet | Progressive; Conservative | Don Campbell | Progressive; Conservative |
| 2nd Prince | George Dewar | Progressive; Conservative | Robert Grindlay | Progressive; Conservative |
| 3rd Prince | Henry Wedge | Progressive; Conservative | Keith Harrington | Progressive; Conservative |
| 4th Prince | J. George MacKay | Liberal | Cleveland Baker | Liberal |
| 5th Prince | Hubert B. MacNeill | Progressive; Conservative | G. Lorne Monkley | Progressive; Conservative |
