= 49th General Assembly of Prince Edward Island =

The 49th General Assembly of Prince Edward Island was in session from March 1, 1960, to November 8, 1962. The Progressive Conservative Party led by Walter Russell Shaw formed the government.

John R. MacLean was elected speaker.

There were four sessions of the 49th General Assembly:

Session	Start	End
1st	March 1, 1960	March 29, 1960
2nd	February 9, 1961	March 16, 1961
3rd	December 4, 1961	December 7, 1961
4th	February 22, 1962	April 6, 1962

== Members ==
=== Kings ===
District	Assemblyman	Party	First elected / previously elected
1st Kings	John R. McLean	Progressive; Conservative	1940, 1947, 1959
2nd Kings	Walter Dingwell	Progressive; Conservative	1959
3rd Kings	Thomas A. Curran	Progressive; Conservative	1959
4th Kings	Lorne Bonnell	Liberal	1951
5th Kings	Stephen Hessian	Liberal	1919, (Note: Assemblyman) 1935, 1955
District	Councillor	Party	First elected / previously elected
1st Kings	Melvin J. McQuaid	Progressive; Conservative	1959
2nd Kings	Leo Rossiter	Progressive; Conservative	1955
3rd Kings	Douglas McGowan	Progressive; Conservative	1959
4th Kings	Alexander Wallace Matheson	Liberal	1940, (Note: 2nd Queens (Assemblyman)) 1947
5th Kings	George Saville (Note: died)	Liberal	1935
5th Kings	George J. Ferguson (1961)	Liberal	1961

=== Prince ===
District	Assemblyman	Party	First elected / previously elected
1st Prince	Hubert Gaudet	Progressive; Conservative	1951, 1959
2nd Prince	George Dewar	Progressive; Conservative	1955
3rd Prince	Henry Wedge	Progressive; Conservative	1959
4th Prince	J. George MacKay	Liberal	1949
5th Prince	Hubert B. MacNeill	Progressive; Conservative	1959
District	Councillor	Party	First elected / previously elected
1st Prince	Don Campbell	Progressive; Conservative	1951, 1959
2nd Prince	Robert Grindlay	Progressive; Conservative	1959
3rd Prince	Keith Harrington	Progressive; Conservative	1959
4th Prince	Cleveland Baker	Liberal	1935, 1947
5th Prince	G. Lorne Monkley	Progressive; Conservative	1959

=== Queens ===
District	Assemblyman	Party	First elected / previously elected
1st Queens	Frank Myers	Progressive; Conservative	1951, 1957
2nd Queens	Philip Matheson	Progressive; Conservative	1943, 1959
3rd Queens	Andrew B. MacRae	Progressive; Conservative	1959
4th Queens	J. Stewart Ross	Liberal	1959
5th Queens	J. David Stewart	Progressive; Conservative	1959
District	Councillor	Party	First elected / previously elected
1st Queens	Walter Russell Shaw	Progressive; Conservative	1959
2nd Queens	Reginald Bell (Note: resigned)	Progressive; Conservative	1943
2nd Queens	Lloyd MacPhail (1961)	Progressive; Conservative	1961
3rd Queens	J. Russell Driscoll	Progressive; Conservative	1959
4th Queens	Harold P. Smith	Liberal	1953
5th Queens	Alban Farmer	Progressive; Conservative	1959
