= 1962 Prince Edward Island general election =

Canadian provincial election

- December 10, 1962

All 30 seats in the Legislative Assembly of Prince Edward Island 16 seats needed for a majority
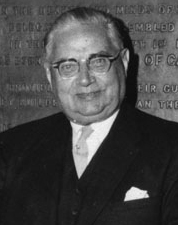

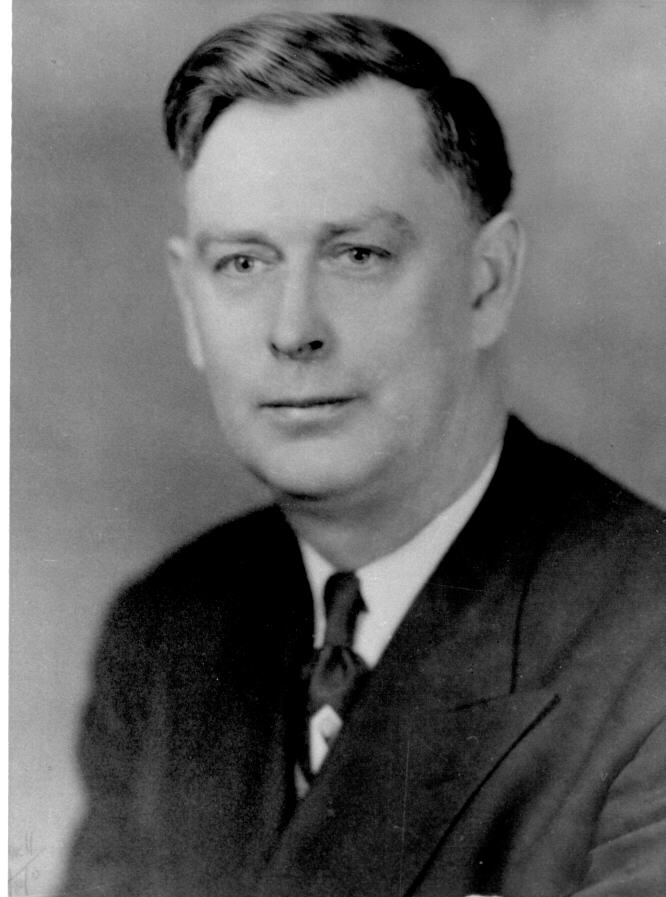
	First party	Second party
Leader	Walter R. Shaw	Alex W. Matheson
Party	Progressive Conservative	Liberal
Leader since	1957	1953
Leader's seat	1st Queens	4th Kings
Last election	22 seats, 50.9%	8 seats, 49.1%
Seats won	19	11
Seat change	▼3	▲3
Popular vote	44,707	43,604
Percentage	50.6%	49.4%
Swing	▼0.3pp	▲0.3pp
- Seats won by each party per district. Voters elect two members (one Councillor and Assemblyman) from each of the 16 districts.
Premier before election
Walter R. Shaw
Progressive Conservative
Premier after election
Walter R. Shaw
Progressive Conservative

The 1962 Prince Edward Island general election was held in the Canadian province of Prince Edward Island on December 10, 1962.

The governing Progressive Conservatives of Premier Walter R. Shaw won re-election with a majority government over the opposition Liberals, led by former Premier Alex W. Matheson.

== Party Standings ==
↓
19	11
PC	Liberal

Party	Party Leader	Seats			Popular Vote		
Party	Party Leader	1959	Elected	Change	#	%	Change
Progressive Conservative	Walter R. Shaw	22	19	-3	44,707	50.6%	-0.3%
Liberal	Alex W. Matheson	8	11	+3	43,604	49.4%	+0.3%

Popular vote
PC	50.62%
Liberal	49.38%

Seats summary
PC	63.33%
Liberal	36.67%

== Members Elected ==
The Legislature of Prince Edward Island had two levels of membership from 1893 to 1996 - Assemblymen and Councillors. This was a holdover from when the Island had a bicameral legislature, the General Assembly and the Legislative Council.

In 1893, the Legislative Council was abolished and had its membership merged with the Assembly, though the two titles remained separate and were elected by different electoral franchises. Assembleymen were elected by all eligible voters of within a district, while Councillors were only elected by landowners within a district. This landowner requirement would be abolished before the next election

=== Kings ===
District	Assemblyman	Party	Councillor	Party
1st Kings	John R. McLean	Progressive; Conservative	Daniel J. MacDonald	Liberal
2nd Kings	Walter Dingwell	Progressive; Conservative	Leo Rossiter	Progressive; Conservative
3rd Kings	Thomas A. Curran	Progressive; Conservative	Douglas McGowan	Progressive; Conservative
4th Kings	Lorne Bonnell	Liberal	Alexander Wallace Matheson	Liberal
5th Kings	Arthur MacDonald	Liberal	George J. Ferguson	Liberal

=== Queens ===
District	Assemblyman	Party	Councillor	Party
1st Queens	Frank Myers	Progressive; Conservative	Walter Russell Shaw	Progressive; Conservative
2nd Queens	Philip Matheson	Progressive; Conservative	Lloyd MacPhail	Progressive; Conservative
3rd Queens	Andrew B. MacRae	Progressive; Conservative	J. Russell Driscoll	Progressive; Conservative
4th Queens	J. Stewart Ross	Liberal	Harold P. Smith	Liberal
5th Queens	J. David Stewart	Progressive; Conservative	Alban Farmer	Progressive; Conservative

=== Prince ===
District	Assemblyman	Party	Councillor	Party
1st Prince	Prosper Arsenault	Liberal	Robert E. Campbell	Liberal
2nd Prince	George Dewar	Progressive; Conservative	Robert Grindlay	Progressive; Conservative
3rd Prince	Henry Wedge	Progressive; Conservative	Keith Harrington	Progressive; Conservative
4th Prince	J. George MacKay	Liberal	Frank Jardine	Liberal
5th Prince	Hubert B. MacNeill	Progressive; Conservative	G. Lorne Monkley	Progressive; Conservative
