= 50th General Assembly of Prince Edward Island =

The 50th General Assembly of Prince Edward Island was in session from March 14, 1963, to April 14, 1966. The Progressive Conservative Party led by Walter Russell Shaw formed the government.

John R. MacLean was elected speaker. Frank Myers replaced MacLean as speaker in 1965.

There were four sessions of the 50th General Assembly:

Session	Start	End
1st	March 14, 1963	March 29, 1963
2nd	February 11, 1964	March 16, 1964
3rd	February 8, 1965	March 24, 1965
4th	February 24, 1966	April 7, 1966

== Members ==
=== Kings ===
District	Assemblyman	Party	First elected / previously elected
1st Kings	John R. McLean (Note: died in 1964)	Progressive; Conservative	1940, 1947, 1959
1st Kings	William A. Acorn (1965)	Liberal	1951, 1965
2nd Kings	Walter Dingwell	Progressive; Conservative	1959
3rd Kings	Thomas A. Curran	Progressive; Conservative	1959
4th Kings	Lorne Bonnell	Liberal	1951
5th Kings	Arthur MacDonald	Liberal	1962
District	Councillor	Party	First elected / previously elected
1st Kings	Daniel J. MacDonald	Liberal	1962
2nd Kings	Leo Rossiter	Progressive; Conservative	1955
3rd Kings	Douglas McGowan	Progressive; Conservative	1959
4th Kings	Alexander Wallace Matheson	Liberal	1940, (Note: 2nd Queens (Assemblyman)) 1947
5th Kings	George J. Ferguson	Liberal	1961

=== Prince ===
District	Assemblyman	Party	First elected / previously elected
1st Prince	Prosper Arsenault	Liberal	1955, 1962
2nd Prince	George Dewar	Progressive; Conservative	1955
3rd Prince	Henry Wedge	Progressive; Conservative	1959
4th Prince	J. George MacKay	Liberal	1949
5th Prince	Hubert B. MacNeill	Progressive; Conservative	1959
District	Councillor	Party	First elected / previously elected
1st Prince	Robert E. Campbell	Liberal	1962
2nd Prince	Robert Grindlay	Progressive; Conservative	1959
3rd Prince	Keith Harrington	Progressive; Conservative	1959
4th Prince	Frank Jardine	Liberal	1962
5th Prince	G. Lorne Monkley (Note: ran for federal seat)	Progressive; Conservative	1959
5th Prince	Alexander B. Campbell (1965)	Liberal	1965

=== Queens ===
District	Assemblyman	Party	First elected / previously elected
1st Queens	Frank Myers	Progressive; Conservative	1951, 1957
2nd Queens	Philip Matheson	Progressive; Conservative	1943, 1959
3rd Queens	Andrew B. MacRae	Progressive; Conservative	1959
4th Queens	J. Stewart Ross	Liberal	1959
5th Queens	J. David Stewart	Progressive; Conservative	1959
District	Councillor	Party	First elected / previously elected
1st Queens	Walter Russell Shaw	Progressive; Conservative	1959
2nd Queens	Lloyd MacPhail	Progressive; Conservative	1961
3rd Queens	J. Russell Driscoll	Progressive; Conservative	1959
4th Queens	Harold P. Smith	Liberal	1953
5th Queens	Alban Farmer	Progressive; Conservative	1959
