= 42nd General Assembly of Prince Edward Island =

The 42nd General Assembly of Prince Edward Island was in session from March 2, 1932, to June 15, 1935. The Conservative Party led by James David Stewart formed the government. William J. P. MacMillan became Premier and party leader following Stewart's death in 1933.

Augustine A. MacDonald was elected speaker. Heath Strong became speaker in 1934.

There were four sessions of the 42nd General Assembly:

| Session | Start | End |
|---|---|---|
| 1st | March 2, 1932 | April 2, 1932 |
| 2nd | March 5, 1933 | April 6, 1933 |
| 3rd | March 6, 1934 | April 5, 1934 |
| 4th | March 5, 1935 | April 4, 1935 |

== Members ==
=== Kings ===
| District | Assemblyman | Party | First elected / previously elected |
|---|---|---|---|
| 1st Kings | Augustine A. MacDonald | Conservative | 1915, 1923 |
| 2nd Kings | Harry Cox | Liberal | 1927 |
| 3rd Kings | Leslie Hunter | Conservative | 1923, 1931 |
| 4th Kings | John A. Campbell | Liberal | 1927 |
| 5th Kings | J. Howard MacDonald | Conservative | 1923, 1931 |
| District | Councillor | Party | First elected / previously elected |
| 1st Kings | Harry D. McLean | Conservative | 1916 |
| 2nd Kings | James P. McIntyre | Liberal | 1919, 1927 |
| 3rd Kings | Francis MacPhee | Conservative | 1926, 1931 |
| 4th Kings | Montague Annear | Liberal | 1931 |
| 5th Kings | James David Stewart | Conservative | 1917 |

=== Prince ===
| District | Assemblyman | Party | First elected / previously elected |
|---|---|---|---|
| 1st Prince | Aeneas Gallant | Liberal | 1931 |
| 2nd Prince | Shelton Sharp | Conservative | 1930 |
| 3rd Prince | Adrien Arsenault | Conservative | 1922 |
| 4th Prince | Heath Strong | Conservative | 1931 |
| 5th Prince | Leonard M. MacNeill | Conservative | 1922, 1927 |
| 5th Prince | John F. MacNeill (1932) | Conservative | 1922, 1927, 1932 |
| District | Councillor | Party | First elected / previously elected |
| 1st Prince | Thane Alexander Campbell | Liberal | 1931 |
| 2nd Prince | William H. Dennis | Liberal | 1915 |
| 3rd Prince | Thomas MacNutt | Conservative | 1922, 1931 |
| 4th Prince | Walter Lea | Liberal | 1915, 1927 |
| 5th Prince | Lucas Allen | Liberal | 1927 |

=== Queens ===
| District | Assemblyman | Party | First elected / previously elected |
|---|---|---|---|
| 1st Queens | Thomas Wigmore | Conservative | 1931 |
| 2nd Queens | David F. Bethune | Conservative | 1931 |
| 3rd Queens | Matthew W. Wood | Conservative | 1931 |
| 4th Queens | J. James Larabee | Liberal | 1927 |
| 5th Queens | W. Allen Stewart | Conservative | 1931 |
| District | Councillor | Party | First elected / previously elected |
| 1st Queens | Walter G. MacKenzie | Conservative | 1931 |
| 2nd Queens | Bradford W. LePage | Liberal | 1919, 1927 |
| 3rd Queens | J. Augustine MacDonald | Conservative | 1923, 1931 |
| 4th Queens | Callum J. Bruce | Liberal | 1928 |
| 5th Queens | William Joseph Parnell MacMillan | Conservative | 1923 |
