= Thomas William Lemuel Prowse =

Canadian politician

The Honourable T. William L. Prowse

17th Lieutenant Governor of Prince Edward Island
- In office October 4, 1950 – March 31, 1958
- Monarchs: George VI; Elizabeth II
- Governors General: The Viscount Alexander of Tunis; Vincent Massey
- Premier: J. Walter Jones; Alex W. Matheson
- Preceded by: Joseph Alphonsus Bernard
- Succeeded by: Frederick Walter Hyndman

MLA (Assemblyman) for 5th Queens
- In office July 23, 1935 – May 18, 1939
- Preceded by: W. Allen Stewart
- Succeeded by: W. F. Alan Stewart
- In office September 15, 1943 – December 11, 1947
- Preceded by: W. F. Alan Stewart
- Succeeded by: David L. Matheson

26th Mayor of Charlottetown
- In office 1930–1932
- Preceded by: Ira J. Yeo
- Succeeded by: William S. Stewart

Personal details
- Born: August 31, 1888 Charlottetown, Prince Edward Island
- Died: November 2, 1973 (aged 85) Charlottetown, Prince Edward Island
- Party: Liberal
- Spouse: Annie Martyn (m. 1913)
- Relations: Lemuel Ezra Prowse (father)
- Children: Lemuel E., Doris H., Margaret F., and Fairlie C.
- Education: Sydney Academy; Prince of Wales College
- Occupation: Businessman
- Profession: Politician
- Cabinet: Minister without Portfolio (1935-1939)(1943-1947)

Thomas William Lemuel Prowse (August 31, 1888 – November 2, 1973) was a businessman and was the 17th Lieutenant Governor of Prince Edward Island from 1950 to 1958.

The son of Lemuel Ezra Prowse and Frances J. Stanley, he was born and educated in Charlottetown, Prince Edward Island.

He was proprietor and president of Prowse Brothers Ltd. in Charlottetown. Active in local politics, he was a councillor on Charlottetown City Council for eight years and served as the 26th mayor from 1930 to 1932.

A Liberal, he was elected to the Legislative Assembly of Prince Edward Island representing the Charlottetown Common and Royalty District in Queens County, first in the 1935 general election and again in 1943. In 1950 he was appointed lieutenant governor of the island and served for eight years.
