= Joseph Alphonsus Bernard =

Canadian politician

The Honourable Joseph Alphonse Bernard

16th Lieutenant Governor of Prince Edward Island
- In office May 30, 1945 – October 4, 1950
- Monarch: George VI
- Governors General: The Earl of Athlone; The Viscount Alexander of Tunis
- Premier: J. Walter Jones
- Preceded by: Bradford William LePage
- Succeeded by: Thomas William Lemuel Prowse

MLA (Assemblyman) for 1st Prince
- In office September 15, 1943 – May 30, 1945
- Preceded by: Aeneas Gallant
- Succeeded by: Clarence Morrissey

Personal details
- Born: March 27, 1881 Tignish, Prince Edward Island
- Died: September 7, 1962 (aged 81) Sherwood, Prince Edward Island
- Party: Liberal
- Spouse: Zoe Chiasson (m. 1909)
- Relations: Stanislaus Francis Perry (father-in-law); Augustin Gallant (son-in-law)
- Children: (Joseph) Theodore, (Marie) Catherine Ann, (Theodore) Stanislaus, (Timothy) Poirier, (Tish) Mary Letitia, (Walter) Hilairin, (Edie) Mary Edith, (Marcella) Mary, (Lefty) Mark Elphege, (Joan) Joan of Arc, (Harold) Cletus, (Benedict) Joseph, (Cecil) John, (Omer) Jules, (Fr. Ralph) John Raphael, (Gloria) Mary, (Norma) Mary
- Occupation: Clerk and merchant
- Profession: Politician

Joseph Alphonse Bernard (March 27, 1881 – September 7, 1962), which later evolved into the anglicized Joseph Alphonsus, was the 16th and first Acadian Lieutenant Governor of Prince Edward Island, serving between 1945 and 1950.

Born on March 27, 1881, in Tignish, Prince Edward Island, Bernard was the son of Acadians Theodore Bernard and Anne Perry, who was the daughter of Stanislaus Francis Perry. He received his education in Tignish and in various locations on the island.

On September 21, 1909, he married Zoë Chiasson of Tignish and they had seventeen children. He was a merchant and served as President of the Tignish Merchants Association. He was the Chairman of the Tignish Library and also Civilian Recruiting Director.

A member of the Liberal Party of Prince Edward Island, Bernard was elected on September 15, 1943, to represent the district of 1st Prince in the Provincial Legislature. He was appointed Lieutenant-Governor of Prince Edward Island on May 30, 1945, and served until October 4, 1950.

He died at a nursing home in Sherwood at the age of 81.

His daughter Marcella married Augustin Gallant.
