= George Aitken (politician) =

Canadian politician

George Beairsto. Aitken (20 May 1836 – 18 February 1909) was a merchant and political figure in Prince Edward Island. He represented 4th Kings in the Legislative Assembly of Prince Edward Island from 1893 to 1897 as a Liberal councillor.

He was born in Lower Montague and was of Scottish descent. In 1868, Aitken married Jane Shaw. He was a justice of the peace.

In the 1897 election, Murdock MacKinnon and George Aitken polled an equal number of votes for the council seat in 4th Kings. MacKinnon was declared elected by Justice E. J. Hodgson under the Controverted Elections Act.

Aitken died of pneumonia in Lower Montague at the age of 72.
