= Manoah Rowe =

Canadian politician

Monoah Rowe (ca 1813 – May 12, 1899) was an English-born farmer, merchant, shipbuilder and political figure on Prince Edward Island. He represented 4th Kings in the Legislative Assembly of Prince Edward Island from 1873 to 1876 as a Liberal.

He came to the island in 1822. For a time, he lived in Summerside, later moving to Montague Bridge. Rowe operated a general store there. He was also a customs collector and operated a tavern in the area. He married Penelope Rowe, whose parents had also come to the island from England.
