= Stephen Gallant =

Canadian politician

Étienne (Stephen) Gallant (February 6, 1844 – February 11, 1918) was a merchant and political figure in Prince Edward Island. He represented 3rd Prince in the Legislative Assembly of Prince Edward Island from 1895 to 1897 as a Liberal member.
