= William Gallant =

Canadian politician

William Marshall Gallant (January 20, 1915 – July 21, 1988) was an air force officer, credit union manager and political figure in Prince Edward Island. He represented 3rd Prince in the Legislative Assembly of Prince Edward Island from 1970 to 1975 as a Liberal.

He was born in Saint Charles, Prince Edward Island, the son of Leo Gallant, and was educated in New Acadia. Gallant served 25 years in the Royal Canadian Air Force. In 1941, he married Lucy Irene Young. After he retired from the air force, he became manager of the credit union at CFB Summerside. Gallant served in the province's Executive Council as Minister of Community Services and Minister of the Environment and Tourism from 1973 to 1974. After he retired from politics in 1975, he moved to Woodstock, New Brunswick. Gallant died at the Victoria Health Centre in Fredericton at the age of 73.
