= John M. Montgomery =

Canadian politician

John Malcolm Montgomery (January 4, 1843 – February 18, 1895) was a farmer and political figure on Prince Edward Island. He represented 3rd Prince in the Legislative Assembly of Prince Edward Island from 1890 to 1893 as a Liberal.

He was born in Princetown, Prince Edward Island, the son of James Townsend Montgomery and Rose McCarty, and was educated in Malpeque. In 1882, he married Mary Emily McNeil. Montgomery was an unsuccessful candidate for a seat in the provincial assembly in 1886. He served as Usher of the Black Rod for the Legislative Council from 1887 to 1890. He ran unsuccessfully for reelection in 1893. He died in Malpeque at the age of 52.
