= Hubert Howatt =

Canadian politician

William Hubert Howatt (September 7, 1867 – January 9, 1919) was a farmer and political figure on Prince Edward Island. He represented the 5th Prince in the Legislative Assembly of Prince Edward Island from 1915 to 1919 as a Liberal.

Born in New Village, Prince Edward Island and educated in Summerside, he was the son of Nelson Howatt and Catherine Platts and the grandson of Cornelius Howatt, who had served in the provincial assembly. He married Mahala Bell in 1890. Howatt was involved in raising silver fox for fur.

He was an unsuccessful candidate for a seat in the provincial assembly in 1912. Howatt died in office at his home in St. Eleanors at the age of 51.
