= John A. Dewar =

Canadian politician

John Alexander Dewar (February 7, 1863 – August 14, 1945) was a farmer and political figure on Prince Edward Island. He represented 3rd Kings in the Legislative Assembly of Prince Edward Island from 1912 to 1917 as a Conservative. Following several votes against his party in the 38th General Assembly, Dewar lost the Conservative nomination in his district. He ran and won re-election as an Independent the 1919 election, but was unable to win in 1923.

He was the son of Robert Dewar and Jessie Dewar. In 1908, he married Laura McPhee. Dewar was a director and vice-president of the provincial Dairyman's Association.

His brother George F. Dewar also served in the provincial assembly, as did his son Lloyd George Dewar.
