= Thomas R. Cullen =

Canadian politician

Thomas Reid Cullen (January 19, 1904 – December 9, 1984) was a Canadian farmer and political figure on Prince Edward Island. He represented 2nd Kings in the Legislative Assembly of Prince Edward Island as a Liberal from 1943 to 1947 and from 1951 to 1955.

He was born in Hope River, Prince Edward Island, the son of Timothy Patrick Cullen and Frances Etta Landrigan, and was educated at Prince of Wales College and Saint Dunstan's College. Cullen taught school for several years. In 1928, he married Pearl Burke. Cullen served as speaker for the assembly from 1944 to 1947. He was defeated when he ran for reelection in 1947. He served as Clerk for the General Assembly from 1949 to 1959 and again from 1966 to 1978. Cullen died at the Queen Elizabeth Hospital in Charlottetown at the age of 80.

His brother Eugene also served as speaker for the assembly.
