= Lucas Allen =

Canadian politician

Lucas R. Allen (July 17, 1878 – April 7, 1964) was a merchant and political figure on Prince Edward Island. He represented 5th Prince in the Legislative Assembly of Prince Edward Island from 1928 to 1939 as a Liberal.

He was born in St. Nicholas, Lot 17, Prince Edward Island, the son of Benjamin C. Allen and Melvina Goodwin, both natives of New Brunswick. Allen was educated in St. Nicholas and Summerside. He worked as a delivery person for Brace, McKay and Company, later becoming manager of the grocery department and then company president. In 1903, he married Winnifred Brace. He was also plant manager for Island Foods Inc., which manufactured dehydrated potatoes for troops during World War II. Allen served on the boards of directors of a number of Prince Edward Island companies, including Brace, McKay and Company. He also served on the town council for Summerside and was president of the Summerside Board of Trade. He served in the province's Executive Council as a minister without portfolio. Allen died in Summerside at the age of 85.
