= Morley Bell =

Canadian politician

Morley Myers Bell (January 14, 1894 – July 2, 1976) was a lawyer and political figure on Prince Edward Island. He represented 5th Prince in the Legislative Assembly of Prince Edward Island from 1946 to 1947 and from 1956 to 1959 as a Liberal.

He was born in Tryon, Prince Edward Island, the son of Donald Bell and Eva Myers, and was educated at Prince of Wales College. Bell served overseas during World War I. He articled with his uncle John Howatt Bell and was called to the bar in 1918. In 1922, he married Flora Robinson. He served on the town council for Summerside from 1940 to 1943. Bell was first elected to the provincial assembly in a 1946 by-election held after Ernest Strong ran for a federal seat. He was defeated when he ran for reelection in 1959. He served as a member of the board for Prince County Hospital for over 45 years.

Bell retired from the practice of law in 1973 and died three years later in Summerside at the age of 82.
