= James Clow (politician) =

Canadian politician

James Clow (1837 – April 1, 1901) was a merchant, farmer and political figure on Prince Edward Island. He represented 4th Kings in the Legislative Assembly of Prince Edward Island from 1890 to 1893 as a Conservative.

He was born in Murray Harbour North, Prince Edward Island, the son of Benjamin Clow; his mother was a native of Scotland. He owned a general store there and was also a justice of the peace. Clow married Lucy Graham in 1857. He represented 2nd Kings in the Legislative Council of Prince Edward Island from 1882 to 1890. Clow was defeated when he ran for reelection in 1893. He died in Murray Harbour North.
