= John F. Gillis =

Canadian politician

John F. Gillis (21 October 1843 – 23 January 1899) was a physician and political figure in Prince Edward Island. He represented 5th Prince in the Legislative Assembly of Prince Edward Island from 1883 to 1890 as a Conservative member.

He was born in Miscouche, Prince Edward Island, the son of John P. Gillis, and was of Scottish descent. He was educated at St. Dunstan's College in Charlottetown and at McGill College. Gillis established his medical practice in Summerside. In 1882, he married Regina Doyle.

Gillis died in Summerside at the age of 55.
