= Lorne MacFarlane =

Canadian politician

Lorne Herbert MacFarlane (April 28, 1904 – January 11, 1971) was a farmer and political figure in Prince Edward Island, Canada. He represented 5th Prince in the Legislative Assembly of Prince Edward Island from 1948 to 1955 as a Liberal.

He was born in Bedeque, Prince Edward Island, the son of Neil Howard MacFarlane and Helen Leard. In 1927, he married Pearl H. Vaughan. MacFarlane spent most of his life in Summerside. He was also a produce dealer and vice-president and founder of MacFarlane Produce. MacFarlane was a co-founder of the Prince Edward Island Bag Company, which was established in 1935 to manufacture jute potato bags, later expanding to produce other types of packages.
