= Joseph Hensley =

Canadian politician

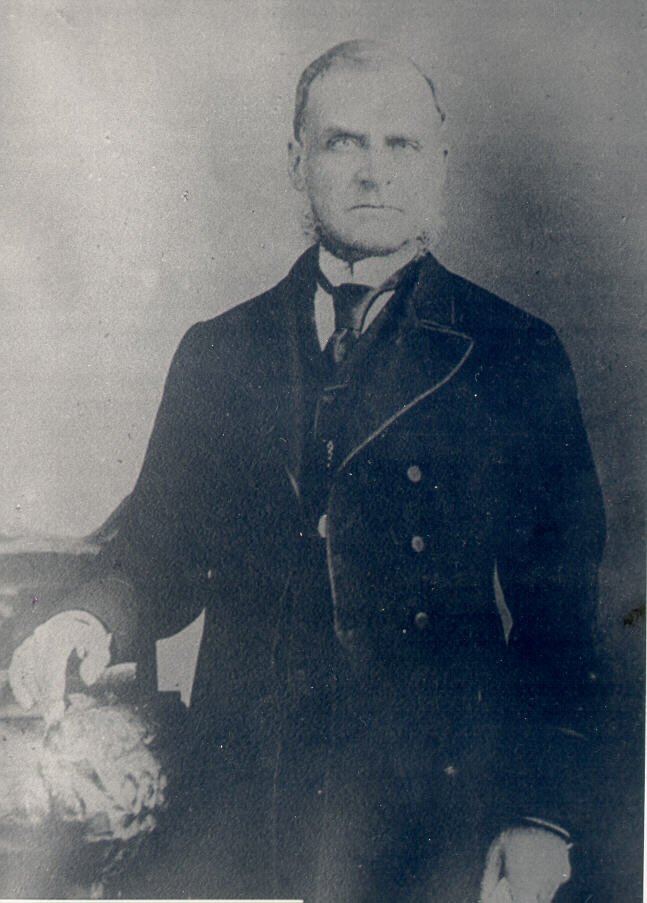
Joseph Hensley

Joseph Hensley (12 June 1824 – 11 May 1894) was a Prince Edward Island politician. His father, Charles Hensley, had been a member of the legislative council and colonial treasurer. Hensley served briefly as Premier of Prince Edward Island in 1869 and then as an associate justice of the province's Supreme Court for a quarter of a century.

== Background ==
Josephy Hensley was born and educated in England. His family settled on PEI in 1841 where Hensley became a lawyer. He was appointed to the legislative council by George Coles and served as Attorney-General under Coles' various Liberal governments of the 1850s. In 1861, Hensley was elected to the House of Assembly in 1861 and became Coles' lieutenant in the legislature. When Coles retired as Liberal leader and Premier in 1869, Hensley succeeded him. Hensley only served in the office for a few months before accepting an appointment to the Supreme Court of Prince Edward Island and was succeeded as premier by Robert Poore Haythorne.

Prior to becoming premier, while serving as Attorney General, Hensley was the prosecutor in the 1869 murder trial of George Dowie, who was executed in Prince Edward Island's last public hanging. During his tenure as a Supreme Court associate justice, he presided over another sensational trial in the murder of Mary Tuplin, in which the defendant William Millman was convicted and hung in 1888.

Hensley's death in 1894 at the age of 69 resulted from what was described as "inflammation of the brain."
