= Brewer Waugh Robinson =

Canadian politician

Brewer Waugh Robinson (January 9, 1891 – January 20, 1949) was a fox rancher and political figure on Prince Edward Island. He represented 5th Prince in the Legislative Assembly of Prince Edward Island from 1939 to 1945 as a Progressive Conservative. Robinson sat for Summerside division in the Senate of Canada from 1945 to 1949. Appointed by Mackenzie King, Robinson sat as a Liberal.

He was born in Summerside, Prince Edward Island, the son of George W. Robinson and Lucy Waugh. After studying in Summerside and at the Commercial College, he worked for the Union Bank of Canada in Western Canada. Robinson returned to the island at the start of World War I and served overseas in an artillery unit. After the war, he became a fox rancher in partnership with his father and also managed the family bakery. In 1919, he married Ethel R. Mills. Robinson was mayor of Summerside in 1936 and 1937, and also served as president of the Summerside Board of Trade. During World War II, he served overseas with the Canadian Legion War Services. He died in office in Summerside at the age of 58.
