= Augustin Gallant =

Canadian politician

Augustin Gallant (August 4, 1916 – May 5, 1994) was an educator, lawyer and political figure on Prince Edward Island. He represented 3rd Prince in the Legislative Assembly of Prince Edward Island from 1954 to 1959 as a Liberal.

He was born in Egmont Bay, Prince Edward Island, the son of Peter Gallant and Eleanor Arsenault. Gallant was educated at Prince of Wales College and then received a teaching license from Mount Allison University. He taught school in Urbainville and was a school principal in Tignish. Gallant served as a pilot in the Royal Canadian Air Force during World War II. In 1943, he married Marcella, the daughter of Joseph Alphonse Bernard. They had seven (7) children. The oldest, Peter Gallant, was born in Vancouver, British Columbia. From there they had five children (Michael, Carroll, John, Robert and Patrick) all born in Prince Edward Island. Their youngest, Richard Gallant, was born in Jonquière, Quebec. He returned to Mount Allison University and then studied law at Dalhousie University. He set up practice in Summerside. Gallant ran unsuccessfully for a seat in the provincial assembly in 1951, losing to J. Wilfred Arsenault. He was first elected to the provincial assembly in a 1954 by-election held after Arsenault resigned his seat. He served as speaker from 1956 to 1958. After he retired from politics, Gallant was a high school principal in Bagotville, Quebec. Twenty years later, he returned to Prince Edward Island, practising law at Alberton from 1979 to 1990. Gallant died in Summerside at the age of 77.
