= George Hilton Barbour =

Canadian politician (1878–1962)

George Hilton Barbour (September 5, 1878 – February 6, 1962) was a farmer and political figure on Prince Edward Island. He represented 2nd Prince in the Legislative Assembly of Prince Edward Island from 1935 to 1942 and from 1943 to 1949 as a Liberal. Barbour sat for Prince division in the Senate of Canada from 1949 to 1962.

He was born in Alma, Prince Edward Island, the son of Thomas Archibald Barbour and Mary Currie, and was educated there and in Boston, Massachusetts. In 1907, he married Carrie Elora Casely. After operating a farm and raising livestock for several years, Barbour became a constable in Alberton, later moving to Howlan. He served as chief prohibition inspector from 1918 to 1927, moving to Summerside in 1923. In 1927, he moved to Charlottetown to become district chief of the Customs and Excise Department. From 1934 to 1945, he operated a farm and raised dairy cattle.

Barbour resigned his seat in the provincial assembly in 1942 after being named to the Wartime Prices and Trade Board in Charlottetown. Barbour served in the province's Executive Council as Minister of Public Works and Highways from 1945 to 1949. He resigned his seat in the provincial assembly in 1949 after being named to the senate. Barbour died in office in Ottawa at the age of 83.
