= Marin Gallant =

Canadian politician

Marin Gallant (July 24, 1873 – October 25, 1958) was a farmer, educator and political figure on Prince Edward Island. He represented 3rd Prince in the Legislative Assembly of Prince Edward Island from 1935 to 1947 as a Liberal.

He was born in South Rustico, Prince Edward Island, the son of Arcade Gallant and Virginia Blanchard, and was educated at Saint Dunstan's College. Gallant taught school in Rustico, Miscouche and Egmont Bay. In 1907, Gallant married Marie-Rose Arsenault. He was a public school inspector for French schools from 1910 to 1922 and from 1927 to 1932. He ran unsuccessfully for a seat in the provincial assembly in 1927. Gallant served in the province's Executive Council as a minister without portfolio from 1935 to 1946.
