= Bradford William LePage =

Canadian politician

The Honourable Bradford W. LePage

15th Lieutenant Governor of Prince Edward Island
- In office October 1, 1939 – May 30, 1945
- Monarch: George VI
- Governors General: The Lord Tweedsmuir; The Earl of Athlone
- Premier: Thane Campbell; J. Walter Jones
- Preceded by: George Des Brisay de Blois
- Succeeded by: Joseph Alphonsus Bernard

MLA (Assemblyman) for 2nd Queens
- In office July 24, 1919 – June 26, 1923
- Preceded by: George E. Hughes
- Succeeded by: John Buntain

MLA (Councillor) for 2nd Queens
- In office June 25, 1927 – October 1, 1939
- Preceded by: Louis Jenkins
- Succeeded by: Alex W. Matheson

Personal details
- Born: February 19, 1876 Rusticoville, Prince Edward Island
- Died: December 4, 1958 (aged 82) Charlottetown, Prince Edward Island
- Party: Liberal
- Spouse: Harriet Edna Christie (m. 1897)
- Children: William Reuel and Hilda Ruth
- Occupation: merchant and lobster packer
- Profession: Politician
- Cabinet: Minister without Portfolio (1927–1931)(1935–1936) acting Premier (1936) acting Minister of Agriculture (1936)

Bradford William LePage (February 19, 1876 – December 4, 1958) was a Canadian politician and the 15th Lieutenant Governor of Prince Edward Island.

Born in Rusticoville, Prince Edward Island, LePage owned and operated a general store prior to entering politics. He and his family moved to Charlottetown after his election to the provincial legislature. LePage sold his store to his brother, Garfield LePage, and opened the Lepage Shoe Company which was operated for many years by his son, William Reuel, and his grandsons, Walter B. LePage and Don Wonnacott (Don was the last to own and operate The LePage Shoe Co.).

LePage was first elected as a member of the Liberal Party of Prince Edward Island in the district of 2nd Queens in the 1919 election. He was re-elected in the 1927, 1931, 1935, and the 1939 elections.

He was Lieutenant Governor from October 1, 1939, to May 30, 1945.

On February 24, 1897, he married Harriett Christie. They had two children, William Reuel and Hilda Ruth.
