= Robert Haythorne =

Canadian politician

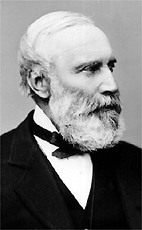
Robert Poore Haythorne

Robert Poore Haythorne (2 December 1815 – 7 May 1891) was a Prince Edward Island politician and premier. He was born in England to a prominent family, his father having been mayor of Bristol on several occasions.

Haythorne arrived in Prince Edward Island at the age of 25 and, with his brother, acquired ownership of 10,000 ac (4,000 ha) of land. When the land question became a major issue in the 1860s Haythorne who had been a progressive farmer and a reformer decided to sell his land to his tenants for $2.00/ac ($4.94/ha). His former tenants asked him to run for a seat on the legislative council (which was by then an elected body) in 1867 and he did so winning the seat as a Liberal. Haythorne joined the Liberal government of George Coles and became Premier in 1869 after Coles retired and his successor, Joseph Hensley accepted a judicial appointment.

Politically, Haythorne became skeptical of Canadian Confederation and his government rejected pressure by the British to join Canada because he didn't see confederation as offering a solution to the land question. He favoured reciprocity with the United States as an alternative. Haythorne's majority in the legislature was cut to only four seats as a result of the 1870 election. The issue of school funding divided his government, Haythorne supported funding of separate schools leading to the resignation of several of his ministers and the fall of his government in the fall of 1870.

James Colledge Pope formed a coalition government with dissidents from Haythorne's Liberal party but Pope's government fell in 1872 when its railway policy almost bankrupted the colony. Haythorne's Liberals returned to power but had to commit to a promise to extend the railway to both ends of the island, a project with the colony could not afford. The financial situation forced Haythorne's government to send a delegation to Ottawa in February 1873 and seek terms for admission to Canadian Confederation which would see the completion of the railway and the Canadian government assume the island's debts. Haythorne reached favourable terms including the taking over of the railway by the federal government, the assumption of the colonial debt, an $800,000 payment for the acquisition of proprietary lands in order to settle the land question by allowing land reform, and a promise of continuous steam communication with the mainland.

Haythorne had the legislature dissolved and ran an election on the terms of union with Canada. His Conservative rival, John Colledge Pope, outmanoeuvered Haythorne during the campaign, however, by promising that he could get even better terms. Pope's Tories were elected in April, persuaded Ottawa to increase the promised annual federal subsidy to the island by $25,000 and led the island into confederation on July 1, 1873.

Haythorne was named to the Senate of Canada in October 1873 where he supported free trade with the United States and was an active supporter of the federal Liberal party. He remained a Senator until his death in 1891.
