= Herbert H. Acorn =

Canadian politician (1868–1939)

Herbert Hunt Acorn (August 1868 – December 6, 1939) was a merchant and political figure on Prince Edward Island. He represented 1st Kings in the Legislative Assembly of Prince Edward Island from 1935 to 1939 as a Liberal.

He was born in Lower Montague, Prince Edward Island, the son of Charles Acorn and Caroline Sabine, and was educated there and at the Charlottetown Business School. Acorn worked for Daniel Gordon, then for the firm of Westaway and McDonald and then for Prowse Brothers Ltd, owned by Lemuel Prowse. In 1894, he married Harriet Ann Sellar. He opened a general store in Souris in 1896. After fire destroyed his store, he opened a lumber mill. Acorn was mayor of Souris from 1920 to 1921. He also served as president of the Souris Board of Trade. Acorn died in office at Prince Edward Island Hospital in Charlottetown at the age of 71.

His son William also served in the provincial assembly.
