= Douglas McGowan =

Canadian politician

Douglas McGowan MC

MLA (Councillor) for 3rd Kings
- In office 1959–1966
- Preceded by: Keir Clark
- Succeeded by: Preston MacLure

Personal details
- Born: November 18, 1915 Kilmuir, Prince Edward Island
- Died: October 25, 1989 (aged 73) Montague, Prince Edward Island
- Party: Progressive Conservative

Douglas McGowan, MC (November 18, 1915 – October 25, 1989) was a Canadian politician and businessman. He represented 3rd Kings in the Legislative Assembly of Prince Edward Island from 1959 to 1966 as a Progressive Conservative.

McGowan was born in 1915 in Kilmuir, Prince Edward Island. He married Elizabeth Margaret Watson in 1945. McGowan attended Mount Allison University, and was a businessman by career. He established McGowan Motors in Montague, Prince Edward Island. McGowan was also a municipal councillor, serving as deputy mayor of Montague from 1951 to 1955.

McGowan entered provincial politics in the 1959 election, when he defeated Liberal incumbent Keir Clark by 58 votes to become councillor for the electoral district of 3rd Kings. He was re-elected in the 1962 election. McGowan did not re-offer in the 1966 election.

McGowan died in Montague on October 25, 1989.
