= Mark MacGuigan Sr. =

Canadian politician

Mark Rudolph MacGuigan (November 5, 1894 – April 4, 1972) was an educator, lawyer, judge and political figure on Prince Edward Island. He represented 3rd Queens in the Legislative Assembly of Prince Edward Island from 1935 to 1944 as a Liberal.

He was born in Hope River, Prince Edward Island, the son of Peter P. MacGuigan and Annie M. Hughes. After completing his early education, he taught school from 1910 to 1912, then attended Saint Dunstan's College. He went on to article in law and was called to the bar in 1918. MacGuigan opened his own practice, later taking on Charles St. Clair Trainor as a partner. MacGuigan married Agnes Violet Trainor in 1923. He was an unsuccessful candidate for a seat in the provincial assembly in 1931. MacGuigan resigned his seat in the provincial assembly after he was named a judge in the Supreme Court of Prince Edward Island, serving until 1967. He died while on vacation in St. Petersburg, Florida at the age of 77.

His son Mark Rudolph was a federal cabinet minister and a judge on the Federal Court of Canada (Appeals Division).
