= Eugene Cullen =

Canadian politician (1905–1995)

Eugene Patrick Cullen (August 7, 1905 – July 9, 1995) was a farmer and political figure on Prince Edward Island. He represented 3rd Queens in the Legislative Assembly of Prince Edward Island from 1944 to 1959 as a Liberal.

He was born in Hope River, Prince Edward Island, the son of Timothy Patrick Cullen and Frances Etta Landrigan, and was educated at the Prince Edward Island Agricultural and Technical School. He operated a dairy farm and was also owned a milk processing company. In 1942, he married Gladys Kathleen McCardle. Cullen was first elected to the provincial assembly in a 1944 by-election held after Mark R. MacGuigan was appointed a judge. He was defeated when he ran for reelection in 1959, 1962 and 1966. Cullen served as speaker for the assembly in 1948 and 1949. He was also a member of the province's Executive Council, serving as Minister of Industry and Natural Resources in 1950 and as Minister of Agriculture from 1955 to 1959.

Cullen was also chairman of the board for Saint Dunstan's University, chairman of the board of management for the Prince Edward Island Central School of Nursing and chairman for the Prince Edward Island Health Services Commission. He was a director for the United Way and was chair of the provincial campaign in 1970.

He died in Charlottetown at the age of 89.

His brother Thomas also served in the provincial assembly.
