= Keir Clark =

Canadian politician

William Keir Clark

MLA (Councillor) for 3rd Kings
- In office December 11, 1947 – September 1, 1959
- Preceded by: John Augustine Macdonald
- Succeeded by: Douglas McGowan

MLA (Councillor) for 4th Kings
- In office May 30, 1966 – May 11, 1970
- Preceded by: Alexander Matheson
- Succeeded by: Gilbert Clements

Personal details
- Born: May 30, 1910 Mount Stewart, Prince Edward Island
- Died: November 28, 2010 (aged 100) Eldon, Prince Edward Island
- Party: Liberal
- Spouse: Anna I. McLaren (m. 1940)
- Relations: Russell C. Clark, father
- Children: Gwen, Marion, and Marjorie
- Education: Prince of Wales College
- Occupation: Merchant
- Profession: Politician

William Keir Clark (May 30, 1910 – November 28, 2010) was a Canadian merchant and political figure in Prince Edward Island. After serving as mayor of Montague in 1941 and 1942, he represented 3rd Kings in the Legislative Assembly of Prince Edward Island from 1947 to 1959 and 4th Kings from 1966 to 1970 as a Liberal. In 1970, he sat as an Independent Liberal.

He was born in Mount Stewart, Prince Edward Island, the son of Russell Charles Clark and Marion J. McKay, and was educated at Prince of Wales College and Dalhousie University. In 1940, Clark married Anna I. McLaren. He served as mayor of Montague. Clark served in the province's Executive Council as Minister of Education from 1953 to 1959, as Provincial Treasurer from 1954 to 1955 and as Minister of Health and Municipal Affairs from 1966 to 1969. He resigned from cabinet in 1969, saying that he did not support all aspects of his government's development plan.

He was defeated when he ran for reelection in 1959. In 2008 he became P.E.I.'s oldest living former politician, and he turned 100 in 2010. Clark died in Eldon, Prince Edward Island on November 28, 2010.
