= 1873 Prince Edward Island general election =

Canadian provincial election

The 1873 Prince Edward Island election was held on 1 April 1873 to elect members of the House of Assembly of the British colony of Prince Edward Island. It was won by the Conservative party. This was Prince Edward Island's last general election as a British colony, as it joined Canada on July 1, 1873 as a province.

The election was held using 15 districts, each electing two members in separate contests.

Party	Leader	Seats won	Popular vote	(%)
Conservative	James Colledge Pope	15		
Liberal	Robert Haythorne	10		
Non-party		5		
Totals		30		
