= 3rd Kings =

Former provincial electoral district in Prince Edward Island, Canada

Prince Edward Island electoral district
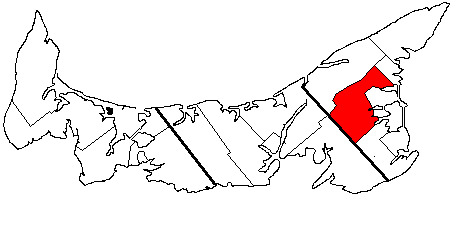

Defunct provincial electoral district
- Legislature: Legislative Assembly of Prince Edward Island
- District created: 1873
- District abolished: 1996
- First contested: 1873
- Last contested: 1993

Demographics
- Census division: Kings County

3rd Kings was a provincial electoral district of Prince Edward Island Canada, which elected two members to the Legislative Assembly of Prince Edward Island from 1873 to 1993.

The district comprised the western central portion of Kings County. It was abolished in 1996.

== Members ==
3rd Kings elected members to the Legislative Council of Prince Edward Island from 1873 to the dissolution of the Legislative Council in 1893. Subsequently, 3rd Kings elected members to the Legislative Assembly of Prince Edward Island until the district was dissolved in 1996. The members it elected were:

=== Dual member ===
Assembly	Years	Member	Party	Member	Party
26th	1873	Lemuel Owen	Conservative	A. C. Macdonald	Conservative
26th	1873–1876	Lemuel Owen	Conservative	James E. MacDonald	Conservative
27th	1876–1879	John Scrimgeour	Liberal	James E. MacDonald	Conservative
28th	1879–1882	Donald Ferguson	Conservative	James E. MacDonald	Conservative
29th	1882–1886	John McDougall	Conservative	Peter McLaren	Conservative
30th	1886–1890	Hugh Lord McDonald	Conservative	Cyrus Shaw	Conservative
30th	1890	James E. MacDonald	Conservative	Cyrus Shaw	Conservative
31st	1890–1893	James E. MacDonald	Conservative	Cyrus Shaw	Conservative

=== Assemblyman-Councillor ===
Assembly	Years	Assemblyman	Party	Councillor	Party
32nd	1893–1897	Cyrus Shaw	Conservative	James E. MacDonald	Conservative
33rd	1897–1900	Cyrus Shaw	Conservative	James E. MacDonald	Conservative
34th	1900–1902	Malcolm MacDonald	Liberal	James E. MacDonald	Conservative
34th	1902–1904	Walter Morson	Conservative	James E. MacDonald	Conservative
34th	1904	Walter Morson	Conservative	Patrick Kelly	Conservative
35th	1904–1908	Walter Morson	Conservative	Patrick Bowland	Liberal
36th	1908–1912	Walter Morson	Conservative	John Alexander Macdonald	Conservative
37th	1912–1915	John A. Dewar	Conservative	John Alexander Macdonald	Conservative
38th	1915–1919	John A. Dewar	Conservative	James Johnstone	Liberal
39th	1919–1923	John A. Dewar	Independent	James Johnstone	Liberal
40th	1923–1925	Leslie Hunter	Conservative	John Alexander Macdonald	Conservative
40th	1925–1927	Leslie Hunter	Conservative	Francis MacPhee	Conservative
41st	1927–1930	John Mustard	Liberal	Thomas Grant	Liberal
41st	1930–1931	John Mustard	Liberal	vacant	
42nd	1931–1935	Leslie Hunter	Conservative	Francis MacPhee	Conservative
43rd	1935–1939	John Mustard	Liberal	Stephen Hessian	Liberal
44th	1939–1943	John Mustard	Liberal	Francis MacPhee	Conservative
45th	1943–1945	Leslie Hunter	Conservative	Francis MacPhee	Conservative
45th	1945–1947	Leslie Hunter	Conservative	John Augustine Macdonald	Conservative
46th	1947–1951	Joseph Campbell	Liberal	Keir Clark	Liberal
47th	1951–1955	John Augustine Macdonald	Conservative	Keir Clark	Liberal
48th	1955–1959	Joseph Campbell	Liberal	Keir Clark	Liberal
49th	1959–1962	Thomas A. Curran	Conservative	Douglas McGowan	Conservative
50th	1962–1966	Thomas A. Curran	Conservative	Douglas McGowan	Conservative
51st	1966–1970	Thomas A. Curran	Conservative	Preston MacLure	Conservative
52nd	1970–1974	William Bennett Campbell	Liberal	Bud Ings	Liberal
53rd	1974–1978	William Bennett Campbell	Liberal	Bud Ings	Liberal
54th	1978–1979	William Bennett Campbell	Liberal	Bud Ings	Liberal
55th	1979–1981	William Bennett Campbell	Liberal	Bud Ings	Liberal
55th	1981–1982	Joey Fraser	Conservative	Bud Ings	Liberal
56th	1982–1986	Joey Fraser	Conservative	Peter MacLeod	Conservative
57th	1986–1989	Joey Fraser	Conservative	Peter MacLeod	Conservative
58th	1989–1993	Peter Doucette	Liberal	Roberta Hubley	Liberal
59th	1993–1996	Peter Doucette	Liberal	Roberta Hubley	Liberal

== See also ==
- List of Prince Edward Island provincial electoral districts
- Canadian provincial electoral districts
