= 5th Prince =

Former provincial electoral district in Prince Edward Island, Canada

Prince Edward Island electoral district
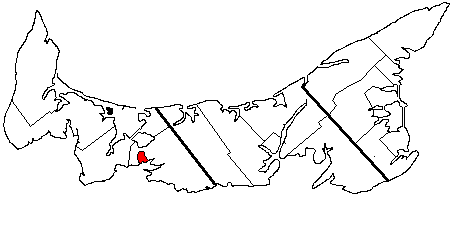

Defunct provincial electoral district
- Legislature: Legislative Assembly of Prince Edward Island
- District created: 1873
- District abolished: 1996
- First contested: 1873
- Last contested: 1993

Demographics
- Census division: Prince County
- Census subdivision: Summerside

5th Prince was a provincial electoral district of Prince Edward Island, Canada, which elected two members to the Legislative Assembly of Prince Edward Island from 1873 to 1993.

The district comprised the town (city after 1995) of Summerside. In the 1873 Prince Edward Island general election, it was known as Summerside and Royalty. The district was abolished in 1996.

== Members ==
1st Kings elected members to the Legislative Council of Prince Edward Island from 1873 to the dissolution of the Legislative Council in 1893. Subsequently, 5th Prince elected members to the Legislative Assembly of Prince Edward Island until the district was dissolved in 1996. The members it elected were:

=== Dual Member ===
Assembly	Years	Member	Party	Member	Party
26th	1873–1875	Thomas Kelly	Conservative	John Lefurgey	Conservative
26th	1875–1876	James Colledge Pope	Conservative	John Lefurgey	Conservative
27th	1876–1879	Angus McMillan	Liberal	John Lefurgey	Conservative
28th	1879–1882	Angus McMillan	Liberal	John Lefurgey	Conservative
29th	1882–1886	John F. Gillis	Conservative	John Lefurgey	Conservative
30th	1886–1890	John F. Gillis	Conservative	John Lefurgey	Conservative
31st	1890–1893	Angus McMillan	Liberal	David Rogers	Conservative

=== Assemblyman-Councillor ===
Parliament	Years	Assemblyman	Party	Councillor	Party
32nd	1893–1897	George Godkin	Liberal	Angus McMillan	Liberal
33rd	1897–1900	Alfred Lefurgey	Conservative	Angus McMillan	Liberal
34th	1900–1904	George Godkin	Liberal	Robert McLeod	Liberal
35th	1904–1908	John M. Clarke	Liberal	George Godkin	Liberal
36th	1908–1912	James A. MacNeill	Conservative	Edward Wyatt	Conservative
37th	1912–1915	James A. MacNeill	Conservative	Edward Wyatt	Conservative
38th	1915–1919	James A. MacNeill	Conservative	William Howatt	Liberal
39th	1919–1923	James A. MacNeill	Conservative	Creelman MacArthur	Liberal
39th	1922–1923	John Forbes MacNeill	Liberal	Creelman MacArthur	Liberal
40th	1923–1926	James A. MacNeill	Conservative	Creelman MacArthur	Liberal
40th	1926–1927	James A. MacNeill	Conservative	George Pope	Conservative
41st	1927–1931	John Forbes MacNeill	Liberal	Lucas Allen	Liberal
42nd	1931–1932	Leonard MacNeill	Liberal	Lucas Allen	Liberal
42nd	1932–1935	John Forbes MacNeill	Liberal	Lucas Allen	Liberal
43rd	1935–1939	Edward Foley	Liberal	Lucas Allen	Liberal
44th	1939–1943	Edward Foley	Liberal	Brewer Robinson	Liberal
45th	1943–1945	Daniel MacNeill	Progressive Conservative	Ernest Strong	Progressive Conservative
45th	1945–1946	Daniel MacNeill	Progressive Conservative	Morley Bell	Liberal
45th	1946–1947	Francis MacNeill	Progressive Conservative	Morley Bell	Liberal
46th	1947–1951	Carrol Delaney	Liberal	Lorne MacFarlane	Liberal
47th	1951–1955	Edward Foley	Liberal	Lorne MacFarlane	Liberal
48th	1955–1959	Edward Foley	Liberal	Morley Bell	Liberal
49th	1959–1962	Hubert MacNeill	Progressive Conservative	Lorne Monkley	Progressive Conservative
50th	1962–1963	Hubert MacNeill	Progressive Conservative	Lorne Monkley	Progressive Conservative
50th	1963–1965	Hubert MacNeill	Progressive Conservative	vacant	
50th	1965–1966	Hubert MacNeill	Progressive Conservative	Alex Campbell	Liberal
51st	1966–1970	Earle Hickey	Liberal	Alex Campbell	Liberal
52nd	1970–1974	Earle Hickey	Liberal	Alex Campbell	Liberal
53rd	1974–1976	Earle Hickey	Liberal	Alex Campbell	Liberal
53rd	1976–1978	George McMahon	Progressive Conservative	Alex Campbell	Liberal
54th	1978	George McMahon	Progressive Conservative	Alex Campbell	Liberal
54th	1978–1979	George McMahon	Progressive Conservative	vacant	
55th	1979–1982	George McMahon	Progressive Conservative	Peter Pope	Progressive Conservative
56th	1982–1986	George McMahon	Progressive Conservative	Peter Pope	Progressive Conservative
57th	1986	George McMahon	Progressive Conservative	Peter Pope	Progressive Conservative
57th	1986–1987	Andy Walker	Progressive Conservative	George McMahon	Progressive Conservative
57th	1987–1989	Andy Walker	Progressive Conservative	Nancy Guptill	Liberal
58th	1989–1993	Walter McEwen	Progressive Conservative	Nancy Guptill	Liberal
59th	1993–1996	Walter McEwen	Progressive Conservative	Nancy Guptill	Liberal

== See also ==
- List of Prince Edward Island provincial electoral districts
- Canadian provincial electoral districts
