= Prosper Arsenault =

Canadian politician

Prosper A. Arsenault (May 25, 1894 – October 28, 1987) was an educator and political figure on Prince Edward Island. He represented 1st Prince in the Legislative Assembly of Prince Edward Island from 1956 to 1959 and from 1962 to 1970 as a Liberal.

He was born in Howlan, Prince Edward Island, the son of Julitte Arsenault, and was educated there and at St. Dunstan's College. He taught school for many years and was also vice-principal of a school in Saskatchewan. He served in the province's Executive Council as a minister without portfolio from 1958 to 1959. He was defeated when he ran for reelection to the provincial assembly in 1959. Arsenault served as speaker from 1966 to 1970.
