= 3rd Prince =

Former provincial electoral district in Prince Edward Island, Canada

Prince Edward Island electoral district
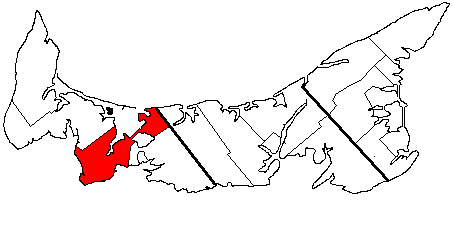

Defunct provincial electoral district
- Legislature: Legislative Assembly of Prince Edward Island
- District created: 1873
- District abolished: 1996
- First contested: 1873
- Last contested: 1993

Demographics
- Census division: Prince County

3rd Prince was a provincial electoral district of Prince Edward Island, which elected two members to the Legislative Assembly of Prince Edward Island from 1873 to 1993.

The district comprised the eastern central portion of Prince County. It was abolished in 1996.

== Members ==
3rd Prince elected members to the Legislative Council of Prince Edward Island from 1873 to the dissolution of the Legislative Council in 1893. Subsequently, 3rd Prince elected members to the Legislative Assembly of Prince Edward Island until the district was dissolved in 1996. The members it elected were:

=== Dual member ===
Assembly	Years	Member	Party	Member	Party
26th	1873–1876	Octave Arsenault	Conservative	John MacDonald	Conservative
27th	1876–1879	Octave Arsenault	Conservative	John MacDonald	Conservative
28th	1879–1882	Octave Arsenault	Conservative	John MacDonald	Conservative
29th	1882–1886	Octave Arsenault	Conservative	John MacDonald	Conservative
30th	1886–1890	Octave Arsenault	Conservative	John MacDonald	Conservative
31st	1890–1893	Octave Arsenault	Conservative	John Montgomery	Liberal

=== Assemblyman-Councillor ===
Assembly	Years	Assemblyman	Party	Councillor	Party
32nd	1893–1895	Octave Arsenault	Conservative	John MacDonald	Conservative
32nd	1895–1897	Stephen Gallant	Liberal	John MacDonald	Conservative
33rd	1897–1900	Félix Arsenault	Conservative	John MacDonald	Conservative
34th	1900–1904	Félix Arsenault	Conservative	Peter MacNutt	Liberal
35th	1904–1908	Félix H. Arsenault	Liberal	Peter MacNutt	Liberal
36th	1908–1912	Aubin-Edmond Arsenault	Conservative	Hector Dobie	Conservative
37th	1912–1915	Aubin-Edmond Arsenault	Conservative	Hector Dobie	Conservative
38th	1915–1919	Aubin-Edmond Arsenault	Conservative	Alfred Edgar MacLean	Liberal
39th	1919–1921	Aubin-Edmond Arsenault	Conservative	Alfred Edgar MacLean	Liberal
39th	1921–1922	vacant		vacant	
39th	1922–1923	Adrien Arsenault	Conservative	Thomas MacNutt	Conservative
40th	1923–1927	Adrien Arsenault	Conservative	Thomas MacNutt	Conservative
41st	1927–1931	Adrien Arsenault	Conservative	Harry Darby	Liberal
42nd	1931–1935	Adrien Arsenault	Conservative	Thomas MacNutt	Conservative
43rd	1935–1939	Marin Gallant	Liberal	Thomas Linkletter	Liberal
44th	1939–1943	Marin Gallant	Liberal	Thomas Linkletter	Liberal
45th	1943–1947	Marin Gallant	Liberal	Thomas Linkletter	Liberal
46th	1947–1951	J. Wilfred Arsenault	Liberal	Thomas Linkletter	Liberal
47th	1951–1954	J. Wilfred Arsenault	Liberal	Frank MacNutt	Liberal
47th	1954–1955	Augustin Gallant	Liberal	Frank MacNutt	Liberal
48th	1955–1959	Augustin Gallant	Liberal	Frank MacNutt	Liberal
49th	1959–1962	Henry Wedge	Progressive Conservative	Keith Harrington	Progressive Conservative
50th	1962–1966	Henry Wedge	Progressive Conservative	Keith Harrington	Progressive Conservative
51st	1966–1970	Henry Wedge	Progressive Conservative	Keith Harrington	Progressive Conservative
52nd	1970–1974	William Gallant	Liberal	Edward Clark	Liberal
53rd	1974–1975	William Gallant	Liberal	Edward Clark	Liberal
53rd	1975–1978	Léonce Bernard	Liberal	Edward Clark	Liberal
54th	1978–1979	Léonce Bernard	Liberal	Edward Clark	Liberal
55th	1979–1982	Léonce Bernard	Liberal	Edward Clark	Liberal
56th	1982–1986	Léonce Bernard	Liberal	Edward Clark	Liberal
57th	1986–1989	Léonce Bernard	Liberal	Edward Clark	Liberal
58th	1989–1993	Léonce Bernard	Liberal	Edward Clark	Liberal
59th	1993–1996	Robert Maddix	Liberal	Edward Clark	Liberal

== See also ==
- List of Prince Edward Island provincial electoral districts
- Canadian provincial electoral districts
