= William Acorn =

Canadian politician (1915–1966)

William A. Acorn (January 10, 1915 – May 25, 1966) was an automobile dealer and political figure in Prince Edward Island. He represented 1st Kings in the Legislative Assembly of Prince Edward Island from 1951 to 1959 and from 1965 to 1966 as a Liberal.

He was born in Souris, Prince Edward Island, the son of Herbert H. Acorn and Harriet Ann Sellar. In 1938, he married Ann Selina MacIsaac. Acorn was defeated when he ran for reelection in 1959 and in 1962. He was elected in a 1965 by-election held following the death of John R. McLean. Acorn was chosen as the Liberal candidate for the 1966 general election but died in Souris of a heart attack during the campaign at the age of 51.
