= 4th Kings =

Former provincial electoral district in Prince Edward Island, Canada

Prince Edward Island electoral district
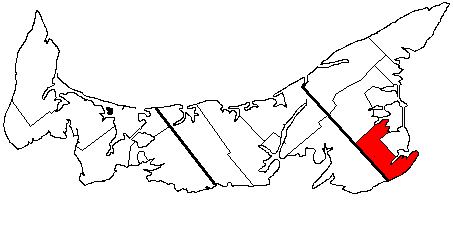

Defunct provincial electoral district
- Legislature: Legislative Assembly of Prince Edward Island
- District created: 1873
- District abolished: 1996
- First contested: 1873
- Last contested: 1993

Demographics
- Census division: Kings County

4th Kings was a provincial electoral district of Prince Edward Island, Canada, which elected two members to the Legislative Assembly of Prince Edward Island from 1873 to 1993.

The district comprised the southernmost portion of Kings County. It was abolished in 1996.

== Members ==
4th Kings elected members to the Legislative Council of Prince Edward Island from 1873 to the dissolution of the Legislative Council in 1893. Subsequently, 4th Kings elected members to the Legislative Assembly of Prince Edward Island until the district was dissolved in 1996. The members it elected were:

=== Dual member ===
Assembly	Years	Member	Party	Member	Party
26th	1873–1876	Louis Henry Davies	Liberal	Manoah Rowe	Liberal
27th	1876–1879	James Robertson	Liberal	Samuel Prowse	Conservative
28th	1879–1883	William Poole	Conservative	Samuel Prowse	Conservative
29th	1882	Malcolm McFadyen	Liberal	James Robertson	Liberal
29th	1882–1886	Malcolm McFadyen	Liberal	Samuel Prowse	Conservative
30th	1886–1890	Angus MacLeod	Liberal	Samuel Prowse	Conservative
31st	1890–1893	Angus MacLeod	Liberal	James Clow	Conservative

=== Assemblyman-Councillor ===
Assembly	Years	Assemblyman	Party	Councillor	Party
32nd	1893–1897	Donald MacKinnon	Liberal	George Aitken	Liberal
33rd	1897–1899	Donald MacKinnon	Liberal	Murdock MacKinnon	Conservative
33rd	1899–1900	Albert Prowse	Conservative	Murdock MacKinnon	Conservative
34th	1900–1904	John Mathieson	Conservative	Murdock MacKinnon	Conservative
35th	1904–1908	Albert Prowse	Conservative	Murdock MacKinnon	Conservative
36th	1908–1912	Albert Prowse	Conservative	Murdock MacKinnon	Conservative
37th	1912–1915	Albert Prowse	Conservative	Murdock MacKinnon	Conservative
38th	1915–1919	Albert Prowse	Conservative	Murdock MacKinnon	Conservative
39th	1919–1923	Wallace Butler	Liberal	William G. Sutherland	Liberal
39th	1922–1923	Wallace Butler	Liberal	Mark Bonnell	Liberal
40th	1923–1926	Maynard McDonald	Conservative	Albert Prowse	Conservative
40th	1926–1927	Maynard McDonald	Conservative	Norman MacLeod	Independent
41st	1927–1931	John Campbell	Liberal	Wallace Butler	Liberal
42nd	1931–1935	John Campbell	Liberal	Montague Annear	Liberal
43rd	1935–1939	John Campbell	Liberal	Montague Annear	Liberal
44th	1939–1943	John Campbell	Liberal	Montague Annear	Liberal
45th	1943–1947	John Campbell	Liberal	Murdock McGowan	Progressive Conservative
46th	1947–1949	John Campbell	Liberal	Alexander Matheson	Liberal
46th	1949–1951	Daniel MacRae	Independent	Alexander Matheson	Liberal
47th	1951–1955	Lorne Bonnell	Liberal	Alexander Matheson	Liberal
48th	1955–1959	Lorne Bonnell	Liberal	Alexander Matheson	Liberal
49th	1959–1962	Lorne Bonnell	Liberal	Alexander Matheson	Liberal
50th	1962–1966	Lorne Bonnell	Liberal	Alexander Matheson	Liberal
51st	1966–1970	Lorne Bonnell	Liberal	Keir Clark	Liberal
52nd	1970–1971	Lorne Bonnell	Liberal	Gilbert Clements	Liberal
52nd	1971–1972	vacant		Gilbert Clements	Liberal
52nd	1972–1974	John Bonnell	Liberal	Gilbert Clements	Liberal
53rd	1974–1978	Charles Fraser	Liberal	Gilbert Clements	Liberal
54th	1978–1979	Pat Binns	Progressive Conservative	Johnnie Williams	Progressive Conservative
55th	1979–1982	Pat Binns	Progressive Conservative	Gilbert Clements	Liberal
56th	1982–1984	Pat Binns	Progressive Conservative	Gilbert Clements	Liberal
56th	1984–1986	Stanley Bruce	Liberal	Gilbert Clements	Liberal
57th	1986–1989	Stanley Bruce	Liberal	Gilbert Clements	Liberal
58th	1989–1993	Stanley Bruce	Liberal	Gilbert Clements	Liberal
59th	1993–1995	Stanley Bruce	Liberal	Gilbert Clements	Liberal
59th	1995–1996	Stanley Bruce	Liberal	Vacant	

== See also ==
- List of Prince Edward Island provincial electoral districts
- Canadian provincial electoral districts
