= Forrest Phillips =

Canadian politician

Forrest William Phillips (July 1, 1887 – July 8, 1972) was a farmer and political figure on Prince Edward Island. He represented 2nd Prince from 1946 to 1959 as a Liberal.

He was born in Ellerslie, Prince Edward Island, the son of Thomas Henry Phillips and Eleanor Agnes Williams. In 1907, he married Gertrude MacArthur. Phillips moved to Mount Royal in 1916. Besides farming, he was also a land appraiser for the Canadian Farm Loans Board. Phillips was first elected to the provincial assembly in a 1946 by-election held after the death of William H. Dennis. He served as speaker for the assembly from 1949 to 1955. He also was a member of the province's Executive Council, serving as Minister of Welfare and Labour in 1956. Phillips died at Prince County Hospital in Summerside at the age of 85.

His daughter Vera married Joshua MacArthur, who also served in the provincial assembly.
