= Aeneas Gallant =

Canadian politician

Pius Aeneas Gallant (February 1, 1882 – November 10, 1971) was a farmer, merchant and political figure on Prince Edward Island. He represented 1st Prince in the Legislative Assembly of Prince Edward Island from 1932 to 1943 as a Liberal.

He was born in Rustico, Prince Edward Island, the son of Dr. Isidore Gallant and Marguerite Campbell. He operated a store in Bloomfield Station for several years. In 1941, Gallant married Lillian-Mae MacAuland. He was accountant for the Falconwood Hospital in Charlottetown from 1943 to 1954. He died in Charlottetown at the age of 89.
