= Brenton St. John =

Canadian politician

John Brenton St. John (11 January 1910 – 16 April 2001) was a merchant and political figure on Prince Edward Island. He represented 1st Kings in the Legislative Assembly of Prince Edward Island from 1949 to 1959.

He was born in Souris, Prince Edward Island, the son of Patrick St. John and Anastasia MacAulay, and was educated at Saint Dunstan's College. St. John was director of a fish factory and a dealer and exporter of farm produce. In 1949, he married Edna Campbell. St. John served nine years as a member of the town council for Souris. He was first elected to the provincial assembly in a 1949 by-election held after Thomas Joseph Kickham was elected to the House of Commons. St. John served in the provincial cabinet as a minister without portfolio from 1951 to 1953 and was deputy Speaker from 1954 to 1959. He was defeated when he ran for reelection in 1959. St. John died in 2001 at the age of 91.
