= Russell Charles Clark =

Canadian politician (1878–1964)

Russell Charles Clark (December 22, 1878 – July 15, 1964) was a farmer, merchant and political figure in Prince Edward Island. He represented 3rd Queens in the Legislative Assembly of Prince Edward Island from 1928 to 1931 and from 1935 to 1959 as a Liberal.

He was born in Mount Stewart, Prince Edward Island, the son of Solomon C. Clark and Hannah Newberry, and was educated at Prince of Wales College and Charlottetown Business School. He was a merchant in Mount Stewart, also operated processing plants for lobsters and blueberries, owned a fox ranch and was a partner in a car dealership. In 1900, Clark married Marion J. McKay. He served in the province's Executive Council as a minister without portfolio. He was defeated when he ran for reelection in 1931. Clark died at the Prince Edward Island Hospital in Charlottetown at the age of 85.

His son Keir also served in the provincial assembly.
