= Stephen Hessian =

Canadian politician

Stephen Stanley Hessian (October 2, 1891 – November 5, 1962) was a lawyer and political figure on Prince Edward Island. He represented 5th Kings from 1920 to 1923 and 3rd Kings from 1935 to 1939 and from 1955 to 1962 in the Legislative Assembly of Prince Edward Island as a Liberal.

He was born in Georgetown, Prince Edward Island, the son of Thomas G. Hessian and Hannah Cummings, and was educated at Saint Dunstan's College. In 1928, he married Blanche Wickham. Hessian was speaker for the provincial assembly from 1935 to 1939. Hessian died in Lagos, Nigeria at the age of 71 while representing the province at a Commonwealth Parliamentary Association conference.
