= Lorne Monkley =

Canadian politician and civil servant

George Lorne Monkley (June 24, 1914 – March 8, 1997) was a civil servant and political figure on Prince Edward Island. He represented 5th Prince in the Legislative Assembly of Prince Edward Island from 1960 to 1963 as a Progressive Conservative.

He was born in Summerside, Prince Edward Island, the son of Edward H. Monkley and Mae MacDonald. Monkley was secretary-treasurer for Amalgamated Dairies Ltd. In 1939, he married Edna Jane Champion. Monkley served in the armed forces during World War II. After the war, he was a director for the Hillcrest Housing Company which managed housing at CFB Summerside. Monkley served as Clerk of the Legislative Assembly before being elected to office. He resigned his seat in the provincial assembly in 1963 to run for a federal seat. Monkley later served as chairperson for the province's Civil Service Commission. He was the first Chief Electoral Officer for Prince Edward Island, serving from 1965 to 1978. He died in Charlottetown at the age of 77.
