= George Dewar (Canadian politician) =

Canadian politician

Member of the Legislative Assembly of Prince Edward Island
- In office 1955–1974
- In office 1976–1978

Personal details
- Born: Lloyd George Dewar; October 20, 1915 New Perth, Prince Edward Island
- Died: November 19, 2003 (aged 88) O'Leary, Prince Edward Island
- Party: Progressive Conservative
- Relations: John Alexander Dewar, father

Lloyd George Dewar, CM OPEI (October 20, 1915 – November 19, 2003) was a Canadian physician and politician.

Born in New Perth, Prince Edward Island, the son of John A. Dewar and Laura MacPhee, he studied at Prince of Wales College and graduated with an M.D. from Dalhousie University in 1943. During World War II, he was a member of the Royal Canadian Army Medical Corps. After the war, Dewar practiced in Bedeque and O'Leary. He married Greta Jean Price.

Dewar was first elected to the Legislative Assembly of Prince Edward Island as a PC candidate representing district of 2nd Prince in the 1955 elections, going on to represent the riding for 21 years. He served as Minister of Education from 1959 to 1966 and Provincial Secretary from 1964 to 1966. Dewar ran unsuccessfully for a seat in the House of Commons in 1984. He also served as chairman of the O'Leary Museum and Library Association, later the Prince Edward Island Potato Museum.

In 1993, he was made a Member of the Order of Canada and was awarded the Order of Prince Edward Island in 1996.

In 1993, his autobiography, A Prescription For A Full Life was published.

He is buried at the Brudenell Protestant Cemetery in Prince Edward Island.
