= Edward P. Foley =

Canadian politician

Edward P. Foley (March 10, 1891 – October 17, 1980) was a pharmacist and political figure on Prince Edward Island. He represented 5th Prince in the Legislative Assembly of Prince Edward Island from 1935 to 1943, and from 1951 to 1959 as a Liberal.

He was born in Kildare, Prince Edward Island, the son of Patrick Foley. Foley was educated at Prince of Wales College and became a pharmacist in Summerside. He served as a member of the local Board of Trade. Foley was married twice: to Helen Noonan in 1925, then later to Margaret Tierney. He served as speaker in 1939, and in 1943 defeated when he ran for reelection. He was a minister without portfolio in the province's Executive Council from 1954 to 1958. Foley died in Summerside at the age of 89.
