= Dougald MacKinnon =

Canadian politician

Dougald MacKinnon (December 15, 1886 – August 21, 1970) was a farmer and political figure on Prince Edward Island. He represented 4th Queens in the Legislative Assembly of Prince Edward Island from 1935 to 1959 as a Liberal.

He was born in Mount Buchanan, Prince Edward Island, the son of John MacKinnon and Flora Caroline MacLeod. He also fished for lobsters and operated a lobster cannery. In 1915, MacKinnon married Mary Sarah McWilliams. He served in the province's Executive Council as a minister without portfolio from 1939 to 1943, as Minister of Public Works and Highways from 1951 to 1955 and then Minister of Industry and Natural Resources and later Minister of Fisheries. MacKinnon died at home in Mount Buchanan at the age of 83.
