= John R. McLean (Canadian politician) =

Canadian politician

John Robert McLean (January 1, 1906 – October 9, 1964) was a merchant and political figure on Prince Edward Island. He represented 1st Kings in the Legislative Assembly of Prince Edward Island from 1940 to 1943, from 1947 to 1951 and from 1959 to 1964 as a Progressive Conservative.

He was born in Souris, Prince Edward Island, the son of Harry Daniel McLean and Annie Mitchell, and the grandson of John McLean. He was educated at the Pictou Academy. In 1936, he married Marjorie Robina McBeath. He worked at a bank for several years before becoming president of the family business. McLean was defeated by Herbert Acorn when he ran for a seat in the provincial assembly in 1939; he was elected to the provincial assembly in a 1940 by-election held following Acorn's death. He was defeated when he ran for reelection in 1943, 1951 and 1955. McLean served as speaker for the assembly from 1959 until his death in office at the Prince Edward Island Hospital in Charlottetown at the age of 58.
