= John Walter Jones =

Canadian politician

The Honourable John Walter Jones
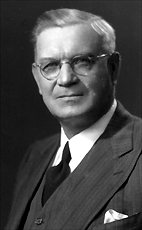

20th Premier of Prince Edward Island
- In office May 11, 1943 – May 25, 1953
- Monarchs: George VI; Elizabeth II
- Lieutenant Governor: Bradford W. LePage; Joseph A. Bernard; T. William L. Prowse
- Preceded by: Thane A. Campbell
- Succeeded by: Alex W. Matheson

Leader of the Prince Edward Island Liberal Party
- In office May 11, 1943 – May 25, 1953
- Preceded by: Thane Campbell
- Succeeded by: Alex W. Matheson

MLA (Councillor) for District of 4th Queens
- In office July 23, 1935 – May 25, 1953
- Preceded by: Callum J. Bruce
- Succeeded by: Harold P. Smith

Senator for Queen's, Prince Edward Island
- In office May 25, 1953 – March 31, 1954
- Appointed by: Louis St. Laurent

Personal details
- Born: April 14, 1878 Pownal, Prince Edward Island
- Died: March 31, 1954 (aged 75) Ottawa, Ontario
- Party: Liberal
- Spouse: Katherine Francis Bovyer (m. 1909)
- Children: 5
- Education: Acadia University
- Occupation: Farmer, scientist, and teacher
- Profession: Politician
- Cabinet: Minister of Public Welfare and Minister in Charge of Air Raid Precautions (1943–1944); Minister of Agriculture (1944–1945); Minister of Education (1945–1950) (1951–1953); Minister of Reconstruction (1945–1949); Provincial Secretary-Treasurer (1949–1950); Minister of Public Works and Highways (1950)

John Walter Jones (April 14, 1878 – March 31, 1954) was a politician and farmer in Prince Edward Island, Canada. An agronomist, he was instrumental in introducing the potato crop to the island, which was to become a staple of the economy. In 1935, he received the King George V medal as the best farmer in the province.

Born in Pownal, he first ran for public office in the 1921 federal election as a Farmer-Progressive candidate, but failed to win a seat in the House of Commons of Canada.

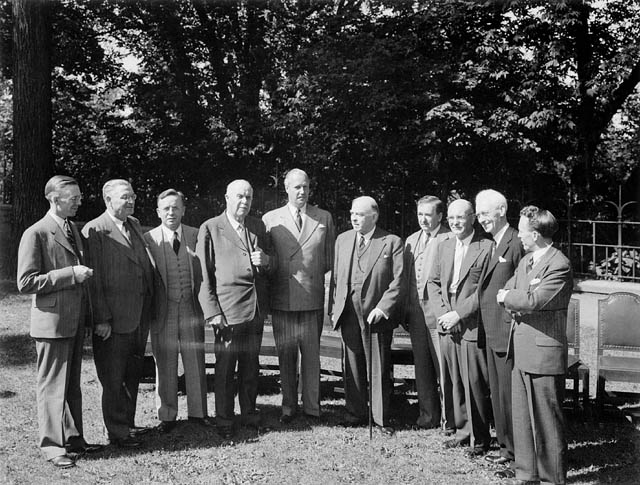
J. Walter Jones (3rd to the left) at the Dominion-Provincial Conference on Reconstruction

He was first elected to the Legislative Assembly of Prince Edward Island as a Liberal in 1935. In 1943, he became the 20th premier of the province when Thane A. Campbell was appointed Chief Justice of the PEI Supreme Court.

The government of "Farmer Jones" repealed strict prohibition, and created the PEI Liquor Control Commission to regulate the sale of liquor. He had to proceed by order-in-council because the lieutenant governor, as a prohibitionist, refused to give Royal Assent to the necessary legislation. In 1947, his government broke a strike at Canada Packers, a meat-packing plant, by seizing the plant, employing strike-breakers and outlawing trade union affiliation with national or international unions in the name of "protect(ing) the farm interest".

He left provincial politics in 1953 to accept an appointment to the Senate of Canada.
