= John George MacKay =

Canadian politician

The Honourable John George MacKay

20th Lieutenant Governor of Prince Edward Island
- In office October 6, 1969 – October 21, 1974
- Monarch: Elizabeth II
- Governors General: Roland Michener; Jules Léger
- Premier: Alex Campbell
- Preceded by: Willibald Joseph MacDonald
- Succeeded by: Gordon Lockhart Bennett

MLA (Councillor) for 4th Prince
- In office July 4, 1949 – April 26, 1951
- Preceded by: Horace Wright
- Succeeded by: Cleveland Baker

MLA (Assemblyman) for 4th Prince
- In office April 26, 1951 – May 30, 1966
- Preceded by: Cleveland Baker
- Succeeded by: Max Thompson

Personal details
- Born: November 6, 1893 Albany, Prince Edward Island
- Died: October 21, 1974 (aged 80) Charlottetown, Prince Edward Island
- Party: Liberal
- Spouse: Muriel Beatrice Boulter (m. 1918)
- Children: John Howatt, Audrey Beryl, Lois Rita, Sutherland Bruce (died at 22) and Phillis (died at seven months)
- Occupation: Farmer
- Profession: Politician
- Cabinet: Minister without Portfolio (1952-1955); Minister of Highways (1955-1959) acting Minister of Public Works and Highways (1967-1969)

John George MacKay (November 6, 1893 – October 21, 1974) was a farmer and political figure on Prince Edward Island. He represented 4th Prince in the Legislative Assembly of Prince Edward Island from 1949 to 1966 as a Liberal. MacKay was the 20th Lieutenant Governor of Prince Edward Island, serving from October 6, 1969, to October 24, 1974.

== Biography ==
He was born in Albany, Prince Edward Island, the son of David MacKay and Almira Harvey, and was educated there. MacKay married Muriel Beatrice Boulter in 1918. He was president of the Tryon Dairying Company and the Tryon Farmers' Institute and also served as a director of the Provincial Swine Breeders' Association. MacKay served in the 10th Siege Battery with the Canadian Expeditionary Force during World War I. After the war, he continued his military service in the Canadian Militia as a sergeant in The Prince Edward Island Light Horse (now part of The Prince Edward Island Regiment (RCAC)). He was a member of the provincial cabinet as a minister without portfolio in 1952 and as Minister of Highways from 1955 to 1959. MacKay died in office at the Prince Edward Island Hospital in Charlottetown at the age of 80.
