= Frank Myers (politician) =

Canadian politician

Frank Sheldon Myers (February 22, 1908 – March 15, 1975) was a farmer and political figure on Prince Edward Island. He represented 1st Queens in the Legislative Assembly of Prince Edward Island from 1951 to 1955 and from 1957 to 1970 as a Conservative.

He was born in Hampton, Prince Edward Island, the son of John Howard Myers and Adelaide Dixon. In 1928, he married Florence May Profitt. Myers was defeated by W. F. Alan Stewart when he ran for reelection in 1955; he was elected in a 1957 by-election held after Stewart's death. He served as speaker from February 1965 to April 1966. Myers was defeated in 1970 by Jean Canfield. He died at home in Crapaud at the age of 67.
