= Reginald Bell =

Canadian politician (1901–1980)

Richard Reginald Bell (December 5, 1901 – March 24, 1980) was a lawyer, judge and political figure on Prince Edward Island. He represented 2nd Queens in the Legislative Assembly of Prince Edward Island from 1944 to 1960 as a Progressive Conservative.

He was born in Charlottetown, Prince Edward Island, the son of Arthur J. Bell and Sarah MacKenzie, and was educated at Prince of Wales College. Bell articled in law with G. S. Inman and was admitted to the bar in 1927. In 1934, he married Helena J. Rogers, the granddaughter of Benjamin Rogers. Bell was a lieutenant in the battery reserve during World War II. He was named King's Counsel in 1946. In 1947, he purchased a farm where he raised cattle, hogs and sheep.

Bell was leader of the provincial Conservative Party from 1950 to 1957. He served in the province's Executive Council as Attorney and Advocate General from 1959 to 1960. He resigned his seat in the provincial assembly in 1960 when he was named to the Supreme Court of Prince Edward Island. Bell died in Charlottetown at the age of 78.

Bell was also a curler. He played for Prince Edward Island at the 1940 and 1942 Macdonald Briers. He served as the president of the Charlottetown Curling Club from 1944 to 1945.
