= W. F. Alan Stewart =

Canadian politician (1885–1956)

Walter Fitz-Alan Stewart (July 11, 1885 – February 9, 1956) was a farmer, fox rancher and political figure in Prince Edward Island. He represented 1st Queens in the Legislative Assembly of Prince Edward Island from 1928 to 1931 and from 1935 to 1957 as a Liberal.

He was born in Strathgartney, Prince Edward Island, the son of Robert Bruce Stewart and Anne Warburton, and was educated at the Ontario Agricultural College. In 1933, he married Marian, the daughter of Walter Lea. Stewart was speaker in 1931 and again from 1940 to 1944. He was defeated when he ran for reelection in 1931. Stewart served in the province's Executive Council as Minister of Agriculture in 1944 and as Minister of Welfare and Labour from 1956 to 1957. He died in office at the age of 70.
