= Alexander Wallace Matheson =

Canadian politician

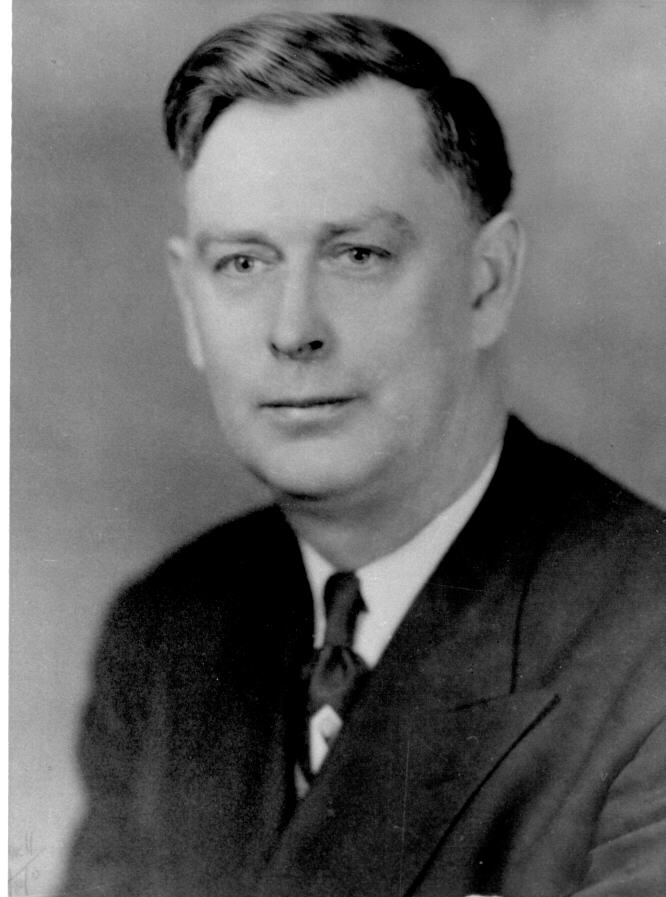

21st Premier of Prince Edward Island
- In office May 25, 1953 – September 16, 1959
- Monarch: Elizabeth II
- Lieutenant Governor: T. William L. Prowse; Frederick W. Hyndman
- Preceded by: J. Walter Jones
- Succeeded by: Walter R. Shaw

Leader of the Prince Edward Island Liberal Party
- In office May 25, 1953 – December 11, 1965
- Preceded by: J. Walter Jones
- Succeeded by: Alex Campbell

MLA (Assemblyman) for 2nd Queens
- In office November 7, 1940 – September 15, 1943
- Preceded by: Bradford W. LePage
- Succeeded by: Reginald Bell

MLA (Councillor) for 4th Kings
- In office December 11, 1947 – May 30, 1966
- Preceded by: Murdock McGowan
- Succeeded by: Keir Clark

Personal details
- Born: June 10, 1903 Bellevue, Prince Edward Island
- Died: March 6, 1976 (aged 72) Charlottetown, Prince Edward Island
- Party: Liberal
- Spouse: Helen B. Farquharson (m. 1937)
- Children: 5
- Education: Prince of Wales College
- Occupation: teacher, lawyer, and judge
- Profession: Politician
- Cabinet: Minister of Health and Welfare (1948–1953)

Alexander Wallace Matheson (June 11, 1903 – March 3, 1976) was a Prince Edward Island politician.

He was born in Bellevue, Prince Edward Island. He was first elected to the provincial legislature in 1940 as a Liberal, representing the district of 2nd Queens. Not reelected in the provincial election of 1943, he was reelected in 1947 in the district of 4th Kings.

Matheson became minister of health and welfare in the government of Premier J. Walter Jones in 1948 and succeeded Jones as premier and attorney-general in 1953. His government was defeated in the 1959 election but remained Liberal Party leader until 1965 when he retired from politics. In 1967 he was appointed a County Court Judge.
