= Cleveland Baker =

Canadian politician

- Born: Chester Cleveland Baker; April 14, 1886; Margate, Prince Edward Island
- Died: June 22, 1967 (aged 81)
- Education: Nova Scotia Agricultural College
- Occupation: farmer
- Spouse: Ethel M. Johnson & Winnifred Gertrude Thompson
- Parent: Richard Herbert Baker & Evelyn England Tuplin

Chester Cleveland Baker (April 14, 1886 – July 22, 1967) was a farmer, fox breeder and political figure on Prince Edward Island. He represented 4th Prince in the Legislative Assembly of Prince Edward Island from 1935 to 1943 and from 1948 to 1962 as a Liberal.

He was born in Margate, Prince Edward Island, the son of Richard Herbert Baker and Evelyn England Tuplin, and was educated at the Nova Scotia Agricultural College. Baker was married twice: to Ethel M. Johnson in 1910 and to Winnifred Gertrude Thompson in 1934. He served as fox inspector for the federal Department of Agriculture from 1925 to 1929. Baker was also president of the Canadian Fox Breeders Association. He was defeated when he ran for reelection to the provincial assembly in 1943. Baker served in the province's Executive Council as Minister of Agriculture from 1949 to 1955. He died in Margate following an accident involving highway maintenance equipment at the age of 81.
