= Prince of Wales College =

Former college in Canada, predecessor of the University of Prince Edward Island

- Collège Prince of Wales
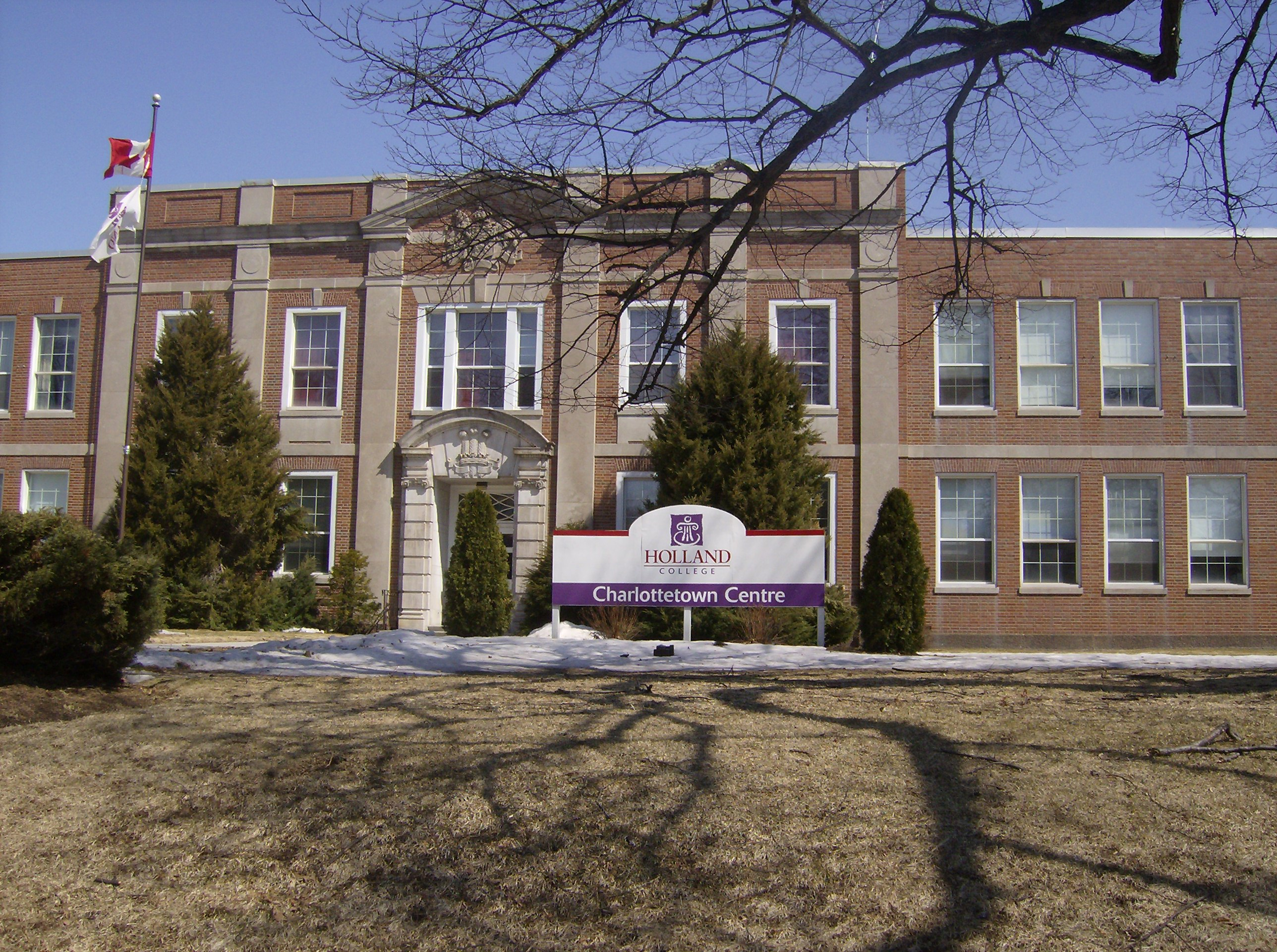
- Prince of Wales College campus on Grafton Street in Charlottetown's east end. It is now known as the "Prince of Wales Campus" for the province's community college system, Holland College.
- Motto: Ich dien (German)
- Motto in English: "I serve"
- Type: University college
- Active: 1804–1969
- Location: Charlottetown, Prince Edward Island, Canada
- Nickname: Flying Welshmen

Prince of Wales College (PWC) is a former university college, which was located in Charlottetown, Prince Edward Island, Canada. PWC merged with St. Dunstan's University in 1969 to form the University of Prince Edward Island.

== History ==
PWC traces its history to 1804 when land was set aside by Lieutenant-Governor Edmund Fanning for a college - the colony's first. In 1821 a district school called the National School opened on the site located on Kent Street in the east end of Charlottetown. In 1835 Central Academy opened on a site along Grafton Street, immediately south of the National School. The National School closed in the early 1850s and the provincial Normal School for training teachers opened on the site in 1856.

In 1860 the Central Academy was upgraded and renamed Prince of Wales College (PWC) in honour of a visit to the colony that year by the Prince of Wales, later to become King Edward VII. In 1879, PWC became co-educational and the Normal School was merged into the institution. A significant expansion took place in the late 1920s and early 1930s when a new brick and stone campus was constructed on the site of the original PWC campus. Ferdinand Herbert Marani, an architect with Marani & Paisley designed the new PWC campus which opened in 1932.

PWC remained a non-denominational or inter-denominational college which served to provide an education comparable to the present-day colleges in Quebec, namely senior matriculation and one or several years of university. It was the non-denominational character of PWC which led many of Island Roman Catholics to label the school as being "Protestant". Many Catholic women attended PWC despite this label because they were barred from attending St. Dunstan's University which was male-only. It was not until 1965 that the provincial government granted PWC a degree-granting charter and the only Bachelor's degrees from PWC were awarded in the spring 1969 convocation.

== Notable administrators ==
PWC had several administrators who proved their importance to Prince Edward Island's education profession:

- Dr. Alexander Anderson served as professor 1862–1868 and principal of PWC from 1868–1901, having influenced many islanders, including Lucy Maud Montgomery.
- Dr. Samuel Napier Robertson served as professor and took over as principal of PWC following Anderson's move into the provincial civil service, serving in that role from 1901 to 1937.
- G. Douglas Steel, a Harvard graduate would be on faculty for 40 years and served from 1937 to 1949 as principal.
- Dr. Frank MacKinnon being invited back to the Island in 1949 at the age of 30, he took on the role of principal until he resigned in 1968, amid an effort by government to amalgamate the college with St. Dunstan's University. Sixteen other PWC faculty resigned soon after.
- Thomas M. Lothian a biology professor became interim principal from 1968 until its dissolution in 1969.

== Merger ==
PWC held high academic standards for its students and as early as the 1910s, McGill University entered into talks related to integrating PWC as its Atlantic coast counterpart to the University of Victoria, which McGill had also helped to establish and nurture. Master plans had called for quadrupling the size of the PWC Grafton Street campus to encompass most of what is now the eastern end of downtown Charlottetown with the proposed PWC-McGill campus being built along the area bounded by Grafton, Prince, Kent, and Edward Streets in a massive redevelopment of the community.

The plans did not come to fruition and by the 1960s, the provincial government began a critical study of its post-secondary education institutions (PWC and SDU), concluding that a merger to form a provincial university was the desired funding and service model for future students. The merger was not without controversy as emotions ran their course on the part of supporters of both institutions, however, in May 1969 the last classes graduated from PWC and SDU and the institutions were merged into the University of Prince Edward Island which opened for the first time in September 1969 on the now-former SDU campus. The PWC campus on Grafton Street was taken over by the provincial government and became part of UPEI during the early period of amalgamation. By the early 1970s it was the Charlottetown campus of a new provincial community college named Holland College.

== See also ==
- Royal eponyms in Canada
