= Prince Edward Island Liberal Party =

Provincial political party in Canada

- Leader: Dan Kutcher
- President: Katie Morello
- Founded: 1873; 153 years ago
- Headquarters: PO Box 2559 Charlottetown, Prince Edward Island; C1A 8C2
- Membership (2025): 3,192
- Ideology: Liberalism (Canadian)
- Political position: Centre
- National affiliation: Liberal Party of Canada
- Colours: Red
- Seats in Legislature: 4 / 27

Website
- www.liberalpei.ca

The Prince Edward Island Liberal Party, officially the Prince Edward Island Liberal Association, is a political party in the province of Prince Edward Island, Canada. It is one of the three parties currently represented in the Legislative Assembly of Prince Edward Island, and, along with its primary rival, the Progressive Conservative Party of PEI, one of only two parties with a continual presence in the provincial legislature since confederation.

The PEI Liberals have formed the government of Prince Edward Island for 90 of the approximately 160 years since PEI became a province of Canada.

== History ==
The party has produced 21 of the province's 35 premiers, including:

- Canada's youngest Premier (Alex Campbell, 32 years and 8 months in 1966, a record later broken by New Brunswick's Brian Gallant who became premier in 2014 at age 32 years and 5 months)
- Canada's first and third premiers of non-European descent (Joe Ghiz in 1986, and his son Robert Ghiz in 2007)
- Canada's first female premier with an elected mandate (Catherine Callbeck in 1993)
- Canada's second gay premier (Wade MacLauchlan in 2015, second to Ontario's Kathleen Wynne).

The party was created in 1867, when PEI was a British colony, by reformers who agitated for the system of responsible government. This was granted by the British crown to the colony in 1851.

George Coles was its dominant figure in its first decades. While initially supportive of Canadian Confederation, Coles and the Liberals soured on the project, and it was not until 1873 that the island joined Canada as a means of relieving the PEI government's severe debts.

The early party supported the abolition of school fees, and a resolution to the "Land Question" that divided the province. The Liberals supported land reform through the state acquisition of large landed estates. These estates were broken up and turned over to tenants and squatters.

The Liberals have been one of only two parties forming government on the island since 1851, the other being the Progressive Conservatives. The Liberals have formed government more often, but not in recent times. In practice, there is little to distinguish the two parties from each other: both lean towards the centre of the political spectrum. The Liberals are slightly to the left and the Conservatives (Tories) slightly to the right.

Traditionally, the Tories have done better among Protestant voters, while Liberals have had more support from Catholics. Politics on the island, however, has never been sectarian, and both parties have always had voters and members from both populations. Indeed, it has been the custom until recently for a Liberal incumbent of one denomination to be opposed by a Tory challenger of the same denomination and vice versa. This had tended to minimize religious sectarianism within the parties. The Liberals have also traditionally enjoyed the support of the province's small Acadian population concentrated in Prince County at the west end of the island. Conservative support has tended to be greater on the eastern half of the island.

In the past forty years, the most significant figures in the party have been Alexander B. Campbell and, later, Joe Ghiz. Liberal governments in the 1960s and 1970s under Campbell supported diversification of the province's agricultural economy. Government incentives were provided to attract manufacturing and tourism. Under Ghiz in the 1980s, the Liberals opposed free trade between Canada and the United States, and the federal Tory government's decision to close a military base on the island. The party's enthusiasm for economic intervention in the economy had waned since the Campbell years.

Ghiz resigned in 1993 and was succeeded by Catherine Callbeck. Callbeck was the third female premier in Canadian history and, after the 1993 election, the first to lead her party to victory in a general election. After three and a half years, Callbeck resigned and was succeeded by Keith Milligan, under whom the Liberals were defeated in the 1996 election, falling to 8 seats. Wayne Carew was elected leader in 1999, and saw the party's fortunes fall further, winning a single seat in the 2000 election. Robert Ghiz, son of Joe Ghiz, was elected leader in 2003.

After more than ten years in opposition, the Liberals returned to government in the 2007 election, and were re-elected in 2011. Ghiz resigned in 2015 and was succeeded as party leader and premier by Wade MacLauchlan, who led the Liberals to a third victory in 2015. After twelve years in government, the Liberals were defeated in the 2019 election, and were reduced to third party status for the first time in their history, behind the Progressive Conservatives and the Green Party. MacLauchlan resigned as party leader shortly after the election.

In 2015, the party abolished membership fees.

As the only candidate to seek the leadership, Sharon Cameron was named leader on November 19, 2022. The party regained opposition status in the 2023 Prince Edward Island general election, winning three seats to the Greens' two, though the party's 17.2% share of the popular vote was the lowest in the party's history. Cameron placed third in her own district, and resigned as party leader days later. Hal Perry was appointed interim leader on April 12, 2023.

In the context of the 2025 Prince Edward Island Liberal Party leadership election, an annual general meeting in May 2025 reverted its 2015 decision and reintroduced membership fees, costing $10 for a two-year party membership. Former interim leader Robert Mitchell was elected leader on October 4. Following two consecutive by-election defeats, Mitchell announced his resignation in July 2026. Perry was again selected as interim leader. Former Summerside mayor Dan Kutcher was acclaimed party leader in October.

== Current MLAs ==
- Robert Henderson, O'Leary-Inverness
- Gord McNeilly, Charlottetown-West Royalty
- Hal Perry, Tignish-Palmer Road
- Carolyn Simpson, Charlottetown-Hillsborough Park

== Election results ==
Election	Leader	Votes	%	Seats	+/−	Position	Status
1931	Walter Lea	33,836	48.3	12 / 30	▼12	▼2nd	Opposition
1935	Walter Lea	43,824	57.9	30 / 30	▲18	▲1st	Supermajority
1939	Thane Campbell	40,201	53.0	27 / 30	▼3	1st	Majority
1943	John Walter Jones	35,396	51.3	20 / 30	▼7	1st	Majority
1947	John Walter Jones	40,758	50.3	24 / 30	▲4	1st	Majority
1951	John Walter Jones	40,847	51.6	24 / 30	Steady	1st	Majority
1955	Alexander Wallace Matheson	44,918	55.0	27 / 30	▲3	1st	Majority
1959	Alexander Wallace Matheson	42,214	49.1	8 / 30	▼19	▼2nd	Opposition
1962	Alexander Wallace Matheson	43,604	49.4	11 / 30	▲3	2nd	Opposition
1966	Alex Campbell	47,065	50.5	17 / 32	▲6	▲1st	Majority
1970	Alex Campbell	64,484	58.4	27 / 32	▲10	1st	Majority
1974	Alex Campbell	64,212	54.0	26 / 32	▼1	1st	Majority
1978	Alex Campbell	64,133	50.7	17 / 32	▼9	1st	Majority
1979	Bennett Campbell	58,175	45.3	11 / 32	▼6	▼2nd	Opposition
1982	Joe Ghiz	60,771	45.8	11 / 32	Steady	2nd	Opposition
1986	Joe Ghiz	75,187	50.3	21 / 32	▲10	▲1st	Majority
1989	Joe Ghiz	85,982	60.7	30 / 32	▲9	1st	Majority
1993	Catherine Callbeck	80,443	55.1	31 / 32	▲1	1st	Majority
1996	Keith Milligan	35,802	44.8	8 / 27	▼23	▼2nd	Opposition
2000	Wayne Carew	26,739	33.84	1 / 27	▼7	2nd	Opposition
2003	Robert Ghiz	34,347	42.66	4 / 27	▲3	2nd	Opposition
2007	Robert Ghiz	43,205	52.93	23 / 27	▲19	▲1st	Majority
2011	Robert Ghiz	38,315	51.39	22 / 27	▼1	1st	Majority
2015	Wade MacLauchlan	33,481	40.83	18 / 27	▼4	1st	Majority
2019	Wade MacLauchlan	24,346	29.40	6 / 27	▼12	▼3rd	Third party
2023	Sharon Cameron	12,876	17.21	3 / 27	▼3	▲2nd	Opposition

== Liberal leaders ==
- George Coles, 1851–1869
- Joseph Hensley, 1869
- Robert Haythorne, 1869–1876
- Louis Henry Davies, 1876–1882
- John Yeo, 1882–1891
- Frederick Peters, 1891–1897
- Alexander Warburton, 1897–1898
- Donald Farquharson, 1898–1901
- Arthur Peters, 1901–1908
- Francis Haszard, 1908–1911
- Herbert James Palmer, 1911–1912
- John Richards, 1912–1915
- John Howatt Bell, 1915–1923
- Albert Charles Saunders, 1923–1930
- Walter Lea, 1930–1936
- Thane Campbell, 1936–1943
- John Walter Jones, 1943–1953
- Alex W. Matheson, 1953–1965
- Lorne Bonnell, 1965 (interim)
- Alexander B. Campbell, 1965–1978
- Bennett Campbell, 1978 (interim), 1978–1981
- Gilbert Clements, 1981 (interim)
- Joseph A. Ghiz, 1981–1993
- Catherine Callbeck, 1993–1996
- Keith Milligan, 1996–1999
- Wayne Carew, 1999–2000
- Ron MacKinley, 2000–2003 (interim)
- Robert Ghiz, 2003–2015
- Wade MacLauchlan, 2015–2019
- Robert Mitchell, 2019 (interim)
- Sonny Gallant, 2019–2022 (interim)
- Sharon Cameron, 2022–2023
- Hal Perry, 2023–2025 (interim)
- Robert Mitchell, 2025–2026
- Hal Perry, 2026 (interim)
- Dan Kutcher, 2026–present

== See also ==
- List of Prince Edward Island premiers
- List of political parties in Prince Edward Island
- Politics of Prince Edward Island
- Prince Edward Island Liberal Party leadership elections
