= Canadian federal election results in Prince Edward Island =

Electoral history
Year	Results
2025	
2021	
2019	
2015	
2011	
2008	
2006	
2004	
2000	
1997	
1993	
1988	
1984	
1980	
1979	
1974	
1972	
1968	
1965	
1963	
1962	
1958	
1957	
1953	
1949	
1945	
1940	
1935	
1930	
1926	
1925	
1921	
1917	
1911	
1909	
1904	
1900	
1896	
1891	
1887	
1882	
1878	
1874	

Canadian federal elections have provided the following results in Prince Edward Island.

== Regional profile ==
=== Seats by party throughout time ===
From 1988 to 2006, Prince Edward Island did not elect a non-Liberal MP. In 2008, the Conservatives finally broke through in the province, as Gail Shea was elected in Egmont. Lawrence MacAulay won by less than 300 votes in both 1997 and 2000, but won with a commanding majority in 2004. In 2011 PEI had an unusual result in which the Conservatives had the most votes province-wide, but won only one out of the four provincial seats. This was due to a comfortable margin of victory in Egmont, and closer losses in the other three ridings. In 2015, the Liberals easily swept all 4 seats. They repeated the sweep in 2019, but with smaller margins due to a large rise in Green support. A third Liberal sweep occurred in 2021, with the Greens support crumbling down to 9%.

Liberal
Conservative
Progressive Conservative (defunct)

=== Votes by party throughout time ===
Election	Liberal	Conservative	New Democratic	Green	PC	Reform / Alliance	Others
1979	26,231; 40.6%	—	4,181; 6.5%	—	34,147; 52.8%	—	54; 0.1%
1980	31,005; 46.8%	—	4,339; 6.6%	—	30,653; 46.3%	—	208; 0.3%
1984	30,075; 41.0%	—	4,737; 6.5%	37; 0.1%	38,160; 52.0%	—	405; 0.6%
1988	37,761; 49.9%	—	5,661; 7.5%	No candidate	31,372; 41.5%	No candidate	850; 1.1%
1993	43,217; 60.2%	—	3,720; 5.2%	249; 0.3%	22,878; 31.9%	744; 1.0%	958; 1.3%
1997	31,595; 44.8%	—	10,675; 15.1%	No candidate	26,998; 38.3%	1,056; 1.5%	219; 0.3%
2000	35,021; 47.0%	—	6,714; 9.0%	250; 0.3%	28,610; 38.4%	3,719; 5.0%	150; 0.2%
2004	40,241; 52.5%	23,499; 30.7%	9,566; 12.5%	3,184; 4.2%	—	—	105; 0.1%
2006	41,195; 52.6%	26,146; 33.4%	7,491; 9.6%	3,025; 3.9%	—	—	509; 0.6%
2008	35,365; 47.7%	26,863; 36.2%	7,232; 9.8%	3,485; 4.7%	—	—	1,225; 1.7%
2011	32,380; 41.0%	32,548; 41.2%	12,135; 15.4%	1,895; 2.4%	—	—	87; 0.1%
2015	51,002; 58.3%	16,900; 19.3%	14,006; 16.0%	5,281; 6.0%	—	—	295; 0.3%
2019	37,300; 43.7%	23,321; 27.3%	6,444; 7.6%	17,817; 20.9%	—	—	412; 0.5%
2021	39,046; 46.3%	26,673; 31.6%	7,802; 9.2%	8,048; 9.5%	—	—	2,793; 3.3%
2025	56,011; 57.6%	35,846; 36.9%	2,367; 2.4%	2,170; 2.2%	—	—	847; 0.9%

Election statistics in Prince Edward Island

Liberal Conservative New Democratic	Green Progressive Conservative (defunct) Alliance / Reform (defunct)

== Detailed results ==
=== 2025 ===
Electoral district	Candidates						Incumbent
Electoral district	Liberal	Conservative	NDP	Green	PPC	Independent	Incumbent
Cardigan	Kent MacDonald; 14,404; 57.0%	James Aylward; 9,442; 37.4%	Lynne Thiele; 505; 2.0%	Maria Rodriguez; 326; 1.3%	Adam Harding; 180; 0.7%	Wayne Phelan; 404; 1.6%	Lawrence MacAulay†
Charlottetown	Sean Casey; 13,656; 64.8%	Natalie Jameson; 6,139; 29.1%	Joe Byrne; 906; 4.3%	Daniel Cousins; 257; 1.2%	Robert Lucas; 131; 0.6%		Sean Casey
Egmont	Bobby Morrissey; 12,466; 51.9%	Logan McLellan; 10,419; 43.4%	Carol Rybinski; 585; 2.4%	Ranald MacFarlane; 538; 2.2%			Bobby Morrissey
Malpeque	Heath MacDonald; 15,485; 57.6%	Jamie Fox; 9,846; 36.6%	Cassie Mackay; 371; 1.4%	Anna Keenan; 1,049; 3.9%	Hilda Baughan; 132; 0.5%		Heath MacDonald

=== 2021 ===
Electoral district	Candidates						Incumbent
Electoral district	Liberal	Conservative	NDP	Green	PPC	Christian Heritage	Incumbent
Cardigan	Lawrence MacAulay; 11,175; 50.58%	Wayne Phelan; 6,817; 30.85%	Lynne Thiele; 2,168; 9.81%	Michael MacLean; 1,064; 4.82%	Kevin Hardy; 725; 3.28%	Fred MacLeod; 145; 0.66%	Lawrence MacAulay
Charlottetown	Sean Casey; 8,919; 46.70%	Doug Currie; 5,932; 31.06%	Margaret Andrade; 2,048; 10.72%	Darcie Lanthier; 1,832; 9.59%	Scott McPhee; 369; 1.93%		Sean Casey
Egmont	Bobby Morrissey; 9,040; 46.21%	Barry Balsom; 6,088; 31.12%	Lisa Bradshaw; 1,688; 8.63%	Alex Clark; 1,771; 9.05%	Wayne Biggar; 974; 4.98%		Bobby Morrissey
Malpeque	Heath MacDonald; 9,912; 41.81%	Jody Sanderson; 7,836; 33.05%	Michelle Neill; 1,898; 8.01%	Anna Keenan; 3,381; 14.26%	Christopher Landry; 680; 2.87%		Wayne Easter†

=== 2019 ===
Electoral district	Candidates					Incumbent
Electoral district	Liberal	Conservative	NDP	Green	Christian Heritage	Incumbent
Cardigan	Lawrence MacAulay; 10,939; 49.35%	Wayne Phelan; 6,439; 29.05%	Lynne Thiele; 1,481; 6.68%	Glen Beaton; 3,068; 13.84%	Christene Squires; 240; 1.08%	Lawrence MacAulay
Charlottetown	Sean Casey; 8,812; 44.26%	Robert A. Campbell; 4,040; 20.29%	Joe Byrne; 2,238; 11.24%	Darcie Lanthier; 4,648; 23.35%	Fred MacLeod; 172; 0.86%	Sean Casey
Egmont	Bobby Morrissey; 8,016; 39.73%	Logan McLellan; 6,934; 34.36%	Sharon Dunn; 1,230; 6.10%	Alex Clark; 3,998; 19.81%		Bobby Morrissey
Malpeque	Wayne Easter; 9,533; 41.38%	Stephen Stewart; 5,908; 25.64%	Craig Nash; 1,495; 6.49%	Anna Keenan; 6,103; 26.49%		Wayne Easter

=== 2015 ===
Electoral district	Candidates					Incumbent
Electoral district	Conservative	NDP	Liberal	Green	Christian Heritage	Incumbent
Cardigan	Julius Patkai; 3,632; 16.15%	Billy Cann; 2,503; 11.13%	Lawrence MacAulay; 14,621; 65.03%	Teresa Doyle; 1,434; 6.38%	Christene Squires; 295; 1.31%	Lawrence MacAulay
Charlottetown	Ron MacMillan; 3,136; 14.82%	Joe Byrne; 4,897; 23.14%	Sean Casey; 11,910; 56.27%	Becka Viau; 1,222; 5.77%		Sean Casey
Egmont	Gail Shea; 6,185; 28.95%	Herb Dickieson; 4,097; 19.18%	Bobby Morrissey; 10,521; 49.25%	Nils Ling; 559; 2.62%		Gail Shea
Malpeque	Stephen Stewart; 3,947; 17.56%	Leah-Jane Hayward; 2,509; 11.17%	Wayne Easter; 13,950; 62.08%	Lynne Lund; 2,066; 9.19%		Wayne Easter

=== 2011 ===
Electoral district	Candidates					Incumbent
Electoral district	Conservative	Liberal	NDP	Green	Christian Heritage	Incumbent
Cardigan	Mike Currie; 8,107; 38.37%	Lawrence MacAulay; 10,486; 49.63%	Lorne Cudmore; 2,164; 10.24%	Leslie Stewart; 373; 1.77%		Lawrence MacAulay
Charlottetown	Donna Profit; 6,040; 32.71%	Sean Casey; 7,292; 39.48%	Joe Byrne; 4,632; 25.08%	Eliza Knockwood; 417; 2.26%	Baird Judson; 87; 0.47%	Shawn Murphy†
Egmont	Gail Shea; 10,467; 54.65%	Guy Gallant; 5,997; 31.31%	Jacquie Robichaud; 2,369; 12.37%	Carl Anthony Arnold; 320; 1.67%		Gail Shea
Malpeque	Tim Ogilvie; 7,934; 39.10%	Wayne Easter; 8,605; 42.40%	Rita Jackson; 2,970; 14.63%	Peter Bevan-Baker; 785; 3.87%		Wayne Easter

=== 2008 ===
Three Liberal incumbents were re-elected. This was the first victory for the Conservatives in Prince Edward Island since 1984.

Electoral district	Candidates					Incumbent
Electoral district	Conservative	Liberal	NDP	Green	Other	Incumbent
Cardigan	Sid McMullin; 5,661; 29.59%	Lawrence MacAulay; 10,105; 52.81%	Mike Avery; 1,556; 8.13%	Emma Daughton; 710; 3.71%	Larry McGuire (Ind.); 1,101; 5.75%	Lawrence MacAulay
Charlottetown	Tom DeBlois; 5,704; 32.11%	Shawn Murphy; 8,893; 50.06%	Brian Pollard; 2,187; 12.31%	Laura M. Bisaillon; 858; 4.83%	Baird Judson (CHP); 124; 0.70%	Shawn Murphy
Egmont	Gail Shea; 8,110; 43.93%	Keith Milligan; 8,055; 43.63%	Orville Lewis; 1,670; 9.05%	Rebecca Ridlington; 626; 3.39%		Joe McGuire†
Malpeque	Mary Crane; 7,388; 39.28%	Wayne Easter; 8,312; 44.19%	J'Nan Brown; 1,819; 9.67%	Peter Bevan-Baker; 1,291; 6.86%		Wayne Easter

=== 2006 ===
All four Liberal incumbents were re-elected. This was the sixth consecutive sweep of Prince Edward Island for the federal Liberals.

Electoral district	Candidates					Incumbent
Electoral district	Liberal	Conservative	NDP	Green	Other	Incumbent
Cardigan	Lawrence MacAulay; 11,542; 56.21%	Don Gillis; 6,923; 33.72%	Edith Perry; 1,535; 7.48%	Haida Arsenault-Antolick; 533; 2.60%		Lawrence MacAulay
Charlottetown	Shawn Murphy; 9,586; 50.16%	Tom DeBlois; 6,524; 34.14%	Brian Pollard; 2,126; 11.12%	David Lobie Daughton; 586; 3.07%	Andrew J. Chisholm (Mar.); 193 1.01%	Shawn Murphy
Charlottetown	Shawn Murphy; 9,586; 50.16%	Tom DeBlois; 6,524; 34.14%	Brian Pollard; 2,126; 11.12%	David Lobie Daughton; 586; 3.07%	Baird Judson (CHP); 97 0.51%	Shawn Murphy
Egmont	Joe McGuire; 10,288; 53.17%	Edward Guergis; 5,991; 30.96%	Regena Kaye Russell; 1,847; 9.55%	Ron Matsusaki; 1,005; 5.19%	Michael Nesbitt (Ind.); 219; 1.13%	Joe McGuire
Malpeque	Wayne Easter; 9,779; 50.48%	George Noble; 6,708; 34.63%	George Marshall; 1,983; 10.24%	Sharon Labchuk; 901; 4.65%		Wayne Easter

=== 2004 ===
Electoral district	Candidates					Incumbent
Electoral district	Liberal	Conservative	NDP	Green	Christian Heritage	Incumbent
Cardigan	Lawrence MacAulay; 11,064; 53.38%	Peter McQuaid; 6,889; 33.24%	Dave MacKinnon; 2,103; 10.15%	Jeremy Stiles; 670; 3.23%		Lawrence MacAulay
Charlottetown	Shawn Murphy; 9,175; 49.36%	Darren Peters; 5,121; 27.55%	Dody Crane; 3,428; 18.44%	Will McFadden; 760; 4.09%	Baird Judson; 105; 0.56%	Shawn Murphy
Egmont	Joe McGuire; 10,220; 55.44%	Reg Harper; 5,363; 29.09%	Regena Kaye Russell; 2,133; 11.57%	Irené Novaczek; 717; 3.89%		Joe McGuire
Malpeque	Wayne Easter; 9,782; 51.90%	Mary Crane; 6,126; 32.50%	Ken Bingham; 1,902; 10.09%	Sharon Labchuk; 1,037; 5.50%		Wayne Easter

==== Maps ====
1. Cardigan
2. Charlottetown
3. Egmont
4. Malpeque
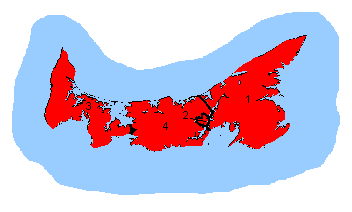
Key map

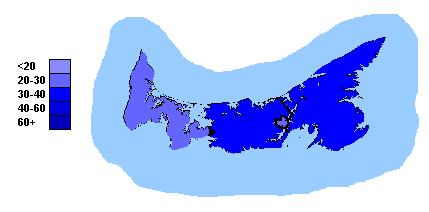
Conservative Party of Canada

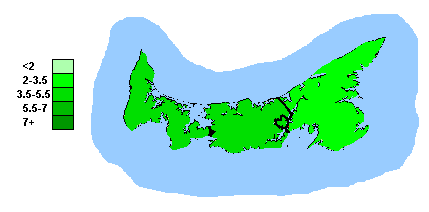
Green Party of Canada

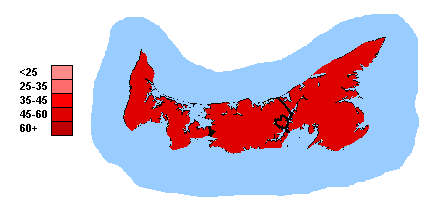
Liberal Party of Canada

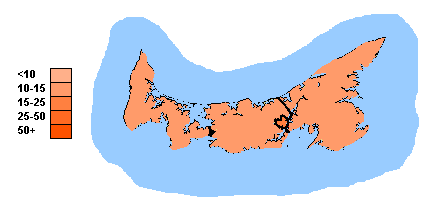
New Democratic Party

=== 2000 ===
Electoral district	Candidates					Incumbent
Electoral district	Liberal	Canadian Alliance	NDP	PC	Other	Incumbent
Cardigan	Lawrence MacAulay; 8,545; 48.06%	Darrell Hickox; 500; 2.81%	Deborah Kelly Hawkes; 465; 2.62%	Kevin MacAdam; 8,269; 46.51%		Lawrence MacAulay
Egmont	Joe McGuire; 9,227; 50.05%	Jeff Sullivan; 952; 5.16%	Nancy Wallace; 1,139; 6.18%	John Griffin; 7,116; 38.60%		Joe McGuire
Hillsborough	Shawn Murphy; 8,277; 41.81%	Gerry Stewart; 1,005; 5.08%	Dody Crane; 4,328; 21.86%	Darren W. Peters; 6,039; 30.50%	Peter Cameron (NLP); 92 0.46% Baird Judson (NA); 58 0.29%	George Proud†
Malpeque	Wayne Easter; 8,972; 48.62%	Chris Wall; 1,262; 6.84%	Ken Bingham; 782; 4.24%	Jim Gorman; 7,186; 38.94%	Jeremy Stiles (Green); 250; 1.35%	Wayne Easter

=== 1997 ===
Electoral district	Candidates					Incumbent
Electoral district	Liberal	Reform	NDP	PC	Other	Incumbent
Cardigan	Lawrence MacAulay; 7,555; 45.05%		Larry Duchesne; 1,761; 10.50%	Dan Hughes; 7,456; 44.46%		Lawrence MacAulay
Egmont	Joe McGuire; 8,498; 48.42%		Adelard Pitre; 1,300; 7.41%	John MacDonald; 7,754; 44.18%		Joe McGuire
Hillsborough	George Proud; 7,630; 40.87%	Blaine Jensen; 476; 2.55%	Dody Crane; 5,751; 30.80%	Mitchell Tweel; 4,594; 24.61%	Baird Jensen (CHP); 145; 0.78%	George Proud
Hillsborough	George Proud; 7,630; 40.87%	Blaine Jensen; 476; 2.55%	Dody Crane; 5,751; 30.80%	Mitchell Tweel; 4,594; 24.61%	Paula Price (NLP); 74; 0.40%	George Proud
Malpeque	Wayne Easter; 7,912; 45.09%	Stephen Livingstone; 580; 3.31%	Andrew Wells; 1,863; 10.62%	Jimmie Gorman; 7,194; 40.99%		Wayne Easter

=== 1993 ===
Electoral district	Candidates						Incumbent
Electoral district	PC	Liberal	NDP	Reform	Christian Heritage	Other	Incumbent
Cardigan	Wilbur MacDonald; 5,360; 32.67%	Lawrence MacAulay; 10,170; 61.67%	Reg Phelan; 934; 5.66%				Lawrence MacAulay
Egmont	Basil Stewart; 6,850; 37.57%	Joe McGuire; 10,687; 57.61%	Basil Brian Dumville; 880; 4.81%				Joe McGuire
Hillsborough	Tom McMillan; 5,269; 26.65%	George Proud; 11,976; 60.57%	Dody Crane; 1,143; 5.78%	Freeman Whitty; 744; 3.76%	Baird Judson; 167; 0.84%	Dave Patterson (Nat.); 350; 1.77%	George Proud
Hillsborough	Tom McMillan; 5,269; 26.65%	George Proud; 11,976; 60.57%	Dody Crane; 1,143; 5.78%	Freeman Whitty; 744; 3.76%	Baird Judson; 167; 0.84%	Peter Cameron (NLP); 123; 0.62%	George Proud
Malpeque	Garth Staples; 5,399; 31.19%	Wayne Easter; 10,579; 60.77%	Karen Fyfe; 763; 4.41%		John Freddie Gunn; 318; 1.84%	Jeremy Stiles (Green); 249; 1.43%	Catherine Callbeck†

=== 1988 ===
Electoral district	Candidates				Incumbent
Electoral district	PC	Liberal	NDP	Other	Incumbent
Cardigan	Pat Binns; 7,936; 43.93%	Lawrence MacAulay; 9,325; 51.62%	Gertrude Partridge; 805; 4.46%		Pat Binns
Egmont	Prowse Chappell; 7,538; 39.40%	Joe McGuire; 10,158; 53.09%	Irene Dyment; 1,438; 7.52%		George Henderson†
Hillsborough	Tom McMillan; 8,638; 42.41%	George Proud; 8,897; 43.68%	Dody Crane; 1,984; 9.74%	David Weale (Ind.); 569; 2.79%	Tom McMillan
Hillsborough	Tom McMillan; 8,638; 42.41%	George Proud; 8,897; 43.68%	Dody Crane; 1,984; 9.74%	Baird Judson (CHP); 281; 1.38%	Tom McMillan
Malpeque	Gordon Lank; 7,260; 40.17%	Catherine Callbeck; 9,381; 51.90%	Judy Whitaker; 1,434; 7.93%		Mel Gass†

=== 1984 ===
Electoral district	Candidates				Incumbent
Electoral district	Liberal	PC	NDP	Other	Incumbent
Cardigan	Bennett Campbell; 8,344; 42.14%	Pat Binns; 10,566; 53.36%	Lorne Cudmore; 891; 4.50%		Bennett Campbell
Egmont	George Henderson; 10,158; 53.09%	George Dewar; 7,859; 44.58%	Wain Munro; 994; 5.64%		George Henderson
Hillsborough	Gerry Birt; 6,768; 39.32%	Tom McMillan; 9,158; 53.20%	David Burke; 846; 4.91%	Big John Muise (Ind.); 323; 1.88%	Tom McMillan
Hillsborough	Gerry Birt; 6,768; 39.32%	Tom McMillan; 9,158; 53.20%	David Burke; 846; 4.91%	Izzurd Goat Mcfadden (Ind.); 82; 0.48%	Tom McMillan
Hillsborough	Gerry Birt; 6,768; 39.32%	Tom McMillan; 9,158; 53.20%	David Burke; 846; 4.91%	David Daughton (Green); 37; 0.21%	Tom McMillan
Malpeque	Paul Schurman; 6,186; 32.96%	Mel Gass; 10,577; 56.35%	Janet Norgrove; 2,006; 10.69%		Mel Gass

=== 1980 ===
Electoral district	Candidates				Incumbent
Electoral district	PC	Liberal	NDP	Other	Incumbent
Cardigan	Wilbur MacDonald; 8,006; 44.90%	Daniel J. MacDonald; 8,590; 48.18%	Aubrey Cantelo; 1,054; 5.91%	Arthur Reddin (Ind.); 180; 1.01%	Wilbur MacDonald
Egmont	David MacDonald; 7,033; 42.63%	George Henderson; 8,639; 52.37%	Vincent Gallant; 824; 5.00%		David MacDonald
Hillsborough	Tom McMillan; 7,128; 47.66%	Gerry Birt; 6,555; 43.83%	Bob Crockett; 1,245; 8.32%	Kathryn Schmidt (M-L); 28; 0.19%	Tom McMillan
Malpeque	Mel Gass; 8,486; 50.14%	David Peppin; 7,221; 42.67%	Vic Arsenault; 1,216; 7.19%		Mel Gass

=== 1979 ===
Electoral district	Candidates				Incumbent
Electoral district	Liberal	PC	NDP	Libertarian	Incumbent
Cardigan	Daniel J. MacDonald; 7,972; 46.67%	Wilbur MacDonald; 8,219; 48.11%	George Macfarlane; 892; 5.22%		Daniel J. MacDonald
Egmont	Bill Reese; 6,233; 39.44%	David MacDonald; 8,861; 56.07%	Vincent Gallant; 710; 4.49%		David MacDonald
Hillsborough	Gordon Tweedy; 5,319; 35.08%	Tom McMillan; 8,338; 54.99%	Bob Crockett; 1,453; 9.58%	Garry Anstett; 54; 0.36%	Heath MacQuarrie†
Malpeque	Don Wood; 7,221; 40.50%	Mel Gass; 8,729; 52.70%	Charlie Sark; 1,126; 6.80%		Don Wood

=== 1974 ===
Electoral district	Candidates				Incumbent
Electoral district	Liberal	PC	NDP	Other	Incumbent
Cardigan	Daniel J. MacDonald; 6,958; 53.99%	Leo James Walsh; 5,429; 42.13%	Martin Kenny; 423; 3.28%	Neil Harpham (Ind.); 77; 0.60%	Daniel J. MacDonald
Egmont	Bill Reese; 6,422; 44.25%	David MacDonald; 7,853; 52.25%	Cletus Shea; 509; 3.51%		David MacDonald
Hillsborough	George Chandler; 8,577; 43.56%	Heath MacQuarrie; 9,917; 50.36%	Preston Macleod; 1,197; 6.08%		Heath MacQuarrie
Malpeque	John Watson MacNaught; 4,975; 44.57%	Angus MacLean; 5,649; 50.61%	Doreen Sark; 537; 4.81%		Angus MacLean

=== 1972 ===
Electoral district	Candidates				Incumbent
Electoral district	Liberal	PC	NDP	Social Credit	Incumbent
Cardigan	Daniel J. MacDonald; 5,528; 44.54%	Alfred Kenneth Fraser; 5,111; 41.18%	Aquinas Ryan; 1,771; 14.27%		Melvin McQuaid†
Egmont	George Olscamp; 5,681; 40.28%	David MacDonald; 7,868; 55.78%	Carroll Kadey; 501; 3.55%	Hugh Ryan; 55; 0.39%	David MacDonald
Hillsborough	Ian Glass; 7,168; 37.26%	Heath MacQuarrie; 10,605; 55.13%	Etsel Ross; 1,464; 7.61%		Heath MacQuarrie
Malpeque	Sinclair Cutcliffe; 4,573; 41.95%	Angus MacLean; 5,835; 53.53%	Maurice Darte; 493; 4.52%		Angus MacLean

=== 1968 ===
Electoral district	Candidates			Incumbent
Electoral district	Liberal	PC	NDP	Incumbent
Cardigan	John Mullally; 5,623; 48.71%	Melvin McQuaid; 5,717; 49.53%	Spurgeon Joseph Hazelden; 203; 1.76%	Melvin McQuaid; King's
Egmont	Melville Campbell; 5,945; 44.30%	David MacDonald; 7,182; 53.52%	Harvey Dawson; 292; 2.18%	David MacDonald; Prince
Hillsborough	Jack McAndrew; 6,447; 41.05%	Heath MacQuarrie; 8,328; 53.03%	David Hall; 930; 5.92%	Heath MacQuarrie; Queen's
Malpeque	Don Wood; 4,839; 47.92%	Angus MacLean; 5,049; 50.00%	Douglas Macfarlane; 211; 2.09%	Angus MacLean; Queen's

=== 1965 ===
Electoral district	Candidates			Incumbent
Electoral district	Liberal	PC	NDP	Incumbent
King's	John Mullally; 4,451; 48.66%	Melvin McQuaid; 4,591; 50.19%	Tobias Wilfred Mullin; 106; 1.16%	John Mullally
Prince	John Watson MacNaught; 8,312; 46.75%	David MacDonald; 9,082; 51.09%	Harvey Dawson; 384; 2.16%	John Watson MacNaught
Queen's	Mark Macguigan; 9,626; 21.57%	Angus MacLean; 12,588; 28.20%	Alexander Maclean; 670; 1.50%	Angus MacLean
Queen's	B. B. Jones; 9,143; 20.48%	Heath MacQuarrie; 12,305; 27.57%	Douglas Macfarlane; 303; 0.68%	Heath MacQuarrie

=== 1963 ===
Electoral district	Candidates			Incumbent
Electoral district	PC	Liberal	NDP	Incumbent
King's	Margaret Macdonald; 4,304; 47.45%	John Mullally; 4,705; 51.87%	Brendon Dunphy; 62; 0.68%	Margaret Macdonald
Prince	Lorne Monkley; 8,387; 47.65%	John Watson MacNaught; 8,967; 50.95%	Gregory McInnis; 247; 1.40%	Orville Phillips†
Queen's	Angus MacLean; 11,666; 27.45%	Ira Lewis; 9,257; 21.78%	Alexander Maclean; 567; 1.33%	Angus MacLean
Queen's	Heath MacQuarrie; 11,608; 27.31%	Allison Gillis; 9,144; 21.51%	Leonard Arsenault; 264; 0.62%	Heath MacQuarrie

=== 1962 ===
Electoral district	Candidates				Incumbent
Electoral district	PC	Liberal	NDP	Social Credit	Incumbent
King's	Margaret Macdonald; 4,548; 48.39%	Thomas Kickham; 4,383; 46.64%	Tommy Dunphy; 467; 4.97%		Margaret Macdonald
Prince	Orville Phillips; 9,133; 49.33%	J. George Mackay; 8,492; 45.87%	Arnold Wood; 735; 3.97%	R. L. Mackillop; 153; 0.83%	Orville Phillips
Queen's	Angus MacLean; 12,117; 26.91%	Ira Lewis; 9,372; 20.81%	Leo Macisaac; 1,403; 3.12%		Angus MacLean
Queen's	Heath MacQuarrie; 11,590; 25.74%	Allison Gillis; 9,356; 20.77%	Wilfred Inman; 1,197; 2.66%		Heath MacQuarrie

=== 1958 ===
Electoral district	Candidates			Incumbent
Electoral district	PC	Liberal	CCF	Incumbent
King's	John Augustine Macdonald; 5,018; 56.37%	Thomas Kickham; 3,884; 43.63%		John Augustine Macdonald
Prince	Orville Phillips; 10,444; 60.39%	John Watson MacNaught; 6,636; 38.37%	Cyrus Gallant; 215; 1.24%	Orville Phillips
Queen's	Angus MacLean; 13,969; 32.66%	Ernest Reid; 7,787; 18.20%		Angus MacLean
Queen's	Heath MacQuarrie; 13,480; 31.51%	J. O. C. Campbell; 7,540; 17.63%		Heath MacQuarrie

=== 1957 ===
Electoral district	Candidates			Incumbent
Electoral district	Liberal	PC	CCF	Incumbent
King's	Thomas Kickham; 4,146; 46.95%	John Augustine Macdonald; 4,598; 52.07%	Alexander Maclean; 87; 0.99%	Thomas Kickham
Prince	John Watson MacNaught; 7,885; 48.25%	Orville Phillips; 8,119; 49.68%	Muriel Macinnis; 339; 2.07%	John Watson MacNaught
Queen's	Neil Matheson; 9,725; 23.36%	Angus MacLean; 11,597; 27.86%	Murdoch Macleod; 254; 0.61%	Angus MacLean
Queen's	Cecil Miller; 9,406; 22.59%	Heath MacQuarrie; 10,651; 25.58%	Murdoch Macleod; 254; 0.61%	Neil Matheson

=== 1953 ===
Electoral district	Candidates			Incumbent
Electoral district	Liberal	PC	CCF	Incumbent
King's	Thomas Kickham; 4,750; 52.07%	John Augustine Macdonald; 4,373; 47.93%		Thomas Kickham
Prince	John Watson MacNaught; 8,782; 52.38%	John Price; 7,431; 44.32%	James Macfarlane; 552; 3.29%	John Watson MacNaught
Queen's	Neil Matheson; 10,351; 25.64%	Angus MacLean; 10,086; 24.98%		Angus MacLean
Queen's	Cecil Miller; 9,991; 24.75%	Chester McLure; 9,946; 24.63%		Chester McLure

=== 1949 ===
Electoral district	Candidates			Incumbent
Electoral district	Liberal	PC	CCF	Incumbent
King's	Thomas Kickham; 4,079; 53.12%	John Augustine Macdonald; 4,482; 46.88%		Thomas Grant†
Prince	John Watson MacNaught; 8,007; 47.04%	John Price; 7,834; 46.02%	Donald MacLean; 1,182; 6.94%	John Watson MacNaught
Queen's	J. Lester Douglas; 10,652; 25.66%	Chester McLure; 10,657; 25.67%	Lorne Houston; 444; 1.07%	J. Lester Douglas
Queen's	Cecil Miller; 9,742; 23.47%	Angus MacLean; 10,016; 24.13%	Lorne Houston; 444; 1.07%	Chester McLure

=== 1945 ===
Electoral district	Candidates			Incumbent
Electoral district	Liberal	PC	CCF	Incumbent
King's	Thomas Grant; 4,655; 50.30%	Hugh MacPhee; 4,282; 46.27%	Mercier Mullin; 317; 3.43%	Thomas Grant
Prince	John Watson MacNaught; 7,346; 47.29%	Ernest Strong; 7,277; 46.85%	Cyrus Gallant; 911; 5.86%	James Ralston†
Queen's	J. Lester Douglas; 9,570; 24.78%	Chester McLure; 9,253; 23.96%	Leo Bradley; 868; 2.25%	J. Lester Douglas
Queen's	Cyrus MacMillan; 9,125; 23.63%	Angus MacLean; 9,213; 23.86%	Allan Callaghan; 589; 1.53%	Cyrus MacMillan

=== 1940 ===
Electoral district	Candidates		Incumbent
Electoral district	Liberal	Conservative (historical)	Incumbent
King's	Thomas Grant; 4,997; 55.05%	Augustine McDonald; 4,081; 44.95%	Thomas Grant
Prince	James Ralston; 8,745; 60.26%	John MacPhee; 5,767; 39.74%	James Ralston
Queen's	Cyrus MacMillan; 10,511; 26.88%	John Orlebar Hyndman; 9,206; 23.54%	Charles Dunning†
Queen's	J. Lester Douglas; 10,411; 26.63%	Chester McLure; 8,974; 22.95%	Vacant (Note: Peter Sinclair Jr. had been elected in 1935, but he had died while in office on March 8, 1938.)

=== 1935 ===
Electoral district	Candidates			Incumbent
Electoral district	Conservative (historical)	Liberal	Reconstruction	Incumbent
King's	Augustine McDonald; 3,510; 36.36%	Thomas Grant; 5,895; 61.06%	George Leslie; 249; 2.58%	Vacant (Note: John Alexander Macdonald had been elected in 1930, but he had been appointed to the Senate of Canada in 1935.)
Prince	J. Frank Arnett; 5,063; 35.42%	Alfred MacLean; 9,233; 64.58%		Alfred MacLean
Queen's	Chester McLure; 7,767; 20.71%	James Larabee; 10,326; 27.54%	Bernard Hughes; 1,004; 2.68%	Chester McLure
Queen's	John H. Myers; 7,262; 19.37%	Peter Sinclair Jr. 10,303; 27.48%	Earl Ings; 836; 2.23%	John H. Myers

=== 1930 ===
Electoral district	Candidates		Incumbent
Electoral district	Liberal	Conservative (historical)	Incumbent
King's	Thomas Grant; 4,391; 48.20%	John Alexander Macdonald; 4,719; 51.80%	John Alexander Macdonald
Prince	Alfred MacLean; 8,058; 55.41%	J. Frank Arnett; 6,485; 44.59%	Alfred MacLean
Queen's	Harold Jenkins; 8,767; 24.53%	Chester McLure; 9,310; 26.05%	Harold Jenkins
Queen's	Cyrus MacMillan; 8,482; 23.73%	John H. Myers; 9,178; 25.68%	John Ewen Sinclair

=== 1926 ===
Electoral district	Candidates		Incumbent
Electoral district	Conservative (historical)	Liberal	Incumbent
King's	John Alexander Macdonald; 4,329; 50.58%	James J. Johnston; 4,229; 49.42%	John Alexander Macdonald
Prince	J. Edward Wyatt; 5,641; 43.38%	Alfred MacLean; 7,362; 56.62%	Alfred MacLean
Queen's	John Messervy; 8,124; 23.98%	Harold Jenkins; 9,006; 26.58%	Harold Jenkins
Queen's	John H. Myers; 8,123; 23.98%	John Ewen Sinclair; 8,625; 25.46%	John Messervy

=== 1925 ===
Electoral district	Candidates			Incumbent
Electoral district	Liberal	Conservative (historical)	Others	Incumbent
King's	James J. Johnston; 3,422; 47.66%	John Alexander Macdonald; 3,758; 52.34%		Vacant (Note: James Hughes had been elected in 1921, but he had been appointed to the Senate of Canada in 1925.)
Prince	Alfred MacLean; 6,692; 56.43%	Shelton Sharp; 5,167; 43.57%		Alfred MacLean
Queen's	Harold Jenkins; 8,167; 26.87%	John Messervy; 7,432; 24.45%	Donald McKinnon (Unknown); 7,392; 24.32%	Donald MacKinnon†
Queen's	John Ewen Sinclair; 7,400; 24.35%	John Messervy; 7,432; 24.45%	Donald McKinnon (Unknown); 7,392; 24.32%	John Ewen Sinclair

=== 1921 ===
Electoral district	Candidates				Incumbent
Electoral district	Conservative (historical)	Liberal	Progressive	Labour	Incumbent
King's	James McIsaac; 3,008; 34.52%	James Hughes; 3,829; 43.94%	Daniel J. Mullin; 1,877; 21.54%		James McIsaac
Prince	James A. McNeil; 4,671; 35.14%	Alfred MacLean; 5,930; 44.61%	Horace Wright; 2,693; 20.26%		W. L. Mackenzie King‡ (ran in York North)
Queen's	John Myers; 6,017; 19.77%	John Ewen Sinclair; 7,367; 24.20%	John Walter Jones; 1,883; 6.19%	Picton S. Brown; 2,537; 8.34%	Donald Nicholson†
Queen's	Donald McKinnon; 5,808; 19.08%	Donald MacKinnon; 6,824; 22.42%	John Walter Jones; 1,883; 6.19%	Picton S. Brown; 2,537; 8.34%	John Ewen Sinclair

=== 1917 ===
Electoral district	Candidates		Incumbent
Electoral district	Unionist	Laurier Liberals	Incumbent
King's	James McIsaac; 2,889; 50.45%	James Hughes; 2,837; 49.55%	James Hughes
Prince	Alfred Lefurgey; 3,974; 48.04%	Joseph Read; 4,298; 51.96%	Vacant (Note: James Richards had been elected in 1911, but he had died whle in office on March 9, 1915.)
Queen's	Donald Nicholson; 5,435; 25.32%	John Ewen Sinclair; 7,367; 24.20%	Angus A. McLean†
Queen's	Alexander Martin; 5,374; 25.04%	Alexander Warburton; 5,276; 24.58%	Donald Nicholson

=== 1911 ===
Electoral district	Candidates		Incumbent
Electoral district	Liberal	Conservative (historical)	Incumbent
King's	James Hughes; 2,538; 50.14%	Austin Fraser; 2,524; 49.86%	Austin Fraser
Prince	James Richards; 3,529; 50.83%	Patrick Murphy; 3,414; 49.17%	James Richards
Queen's	Alexander Warburton; 4,016; 24.15%	Angus A. McLean; 4,392; 26.41%	Lemuel Prowse
Queen's	Lemuel Prowse; 3,915; 23.54%	Donald Nicholson; 4,308; 25.90%	Alexander Warburton

=== 1908 ===
Electoral district	Candidates		Incumbent
Electoral district	Liberal	Conservative (historical)	Incumbent
King's	James Hughes; 2,490; 48.24%	Austin Fraser; 2,672; 51.76%	James Hughes
Prince	James Richards; 3,520; 51.19%	Alfred Lefurgey; 3,356; 48.81%	Alfred Lefurgey
Queen's	Lemuel Prowse; 4,290; 25.62%	Angus A. McLean; 4,145; 24.76%	Alexander Martin
Queen's	Alexander Warburton; 4,196; 25.06%	Alexander Martin; 4,113; 24.56%	Angus A. McLean

=== 1904 ===
Electoral district	Candidates		Incumbent
Electoral district	Liberal	Conservative (historical)	Incumbent
King's	James Hughes; 2,653; 50.54%	John McLean; 2,596; 49.46%	James Hughes
Prince	James Richards; 3,408; 49.33%	Alfred Lefurgey; 3,501; 50.67%	Alfred Lefurgey; East Prince
Prince	James Richards; 3,408; 49.33%	Alfred Lefurgey; 3,501; 50.67%	Edward Hackett†; West Prince
Queen's	Lemuel Prowse; 4,286; 24.82%	Angus A. McLean; 4,522; 26.19%	Donald MacKinnon†; East Queen's
Queen's	Alexander Warburton; 4,094; 23.71%	Alexander Martin; 4,367; 25.29%	Horace Haszard†; West Queen's

=== 1900 ===
Electoral district	Candidates		Incumbent
Electoral district	Conservative (historical)	Liberal	Incumbent
King's	Augustine Macdonald; 1,970; 47.13%	James Hughes; 2,210; 52.87%	Augustine Macdonald
East Prince	Alfred Lefurgey; 2,272; 52.60%	John H. Bell; 2,047; 47.40%	John H. Bell
East Queen's	Alexander Martin; 2,250; 49.92%	Donald MacKinnon; 2,257; 50.08%	Alexander Martin
West Prince	Edward Prowse; 1,854; 50.12%	Bernard McLellan; 1,845; 49.88%	Bernard McLellan
West Queen's	William S. Stewart; 1,793; 41.59%	Louis Henry Davies; 2,528; 58.50%	Louis Henry Davies
