= List of Prince Edward Island senators =

This is a list of past and present members of the Senate of Canada representing the province of Prince Edward Island.

Prince Edward Island, was guaranteed four Senate seats at the 1864 conference in Quebec City of the "Fathers of Confederation", Prince Edward Island representatives campaigned for equal representation claiming that the rights of small provinces needed to be safe guarded. Prince Edward Island delayed joining confederation until 1873 for various reasons including the Senate question. Under the Prince Edward Island Terms of Union, 1873 Prince Edward Island was given four Senate seats.

== Current senators ==
Name	Party	Division^{1}	Date appointed	Nominated by^{2}	Mandatory retirement
Percy Downe	Canadian Senators Group	Charlottetown	March 26, 2003	Chrétien	July 8, 2029
Brian Francis	Progressive Senate Group	Prince Edward Island	October 11, 2018	J. Trudeau	September 28, 2032
Jane MacAdam	Independent Senators Group	Prince Edward Island	May 3, 2023	J. Trudeau	March 1, 2032
Mary Robinson	Canadian Senators Group	Prince Edward Island	January 22, 2024	J. Trudeau	August 3, 2045

Notes:

^{1} Senators are appointed to represent Prince Edward Island. Each senator may choose to designate a geographic area within the province as his or her division.
^{2} Senators are appointed by the governor general on the recommendation of the prime minister.

== Historical ==
Name	Party	Division^{1}	Date appointed	Appointed by^{2}	End of term
Doris Margaret Anderson	Liberal	St. Peter's, Kings County	September 21, 1995	Chrétien	July 5, 1997
Joseph-Octave Arsenault	Conservative	Prince Edward Island	February 18, 1895	Bowell	December 14, 1897
George Hilton Barbour	Liberal	Prince	July 6, 1949	St. Laurent	February 6, 1962
Lorne Bonnell	Liberal	Murray River	November 15, 1971	Trudeau, P. E.	January 4, 1998
Catherine Callbeck	Liberal	Prince Edward Island	September 23, 1997	Chrétien	July 25, 2014
Jedediah Slason Carvell	Conservative	Charlottetown	December 18, 1879	MacDonald	July 3, 1894
Mike Duffy	Conservative	Cavendish	January 2, 2009	Harper	May 21, 2021
Donald Ferguson	Conservative	Queen's	September 4, 1893	Thompson	September 3, 1909
Thomas Vincent Grant	Liberal	Montague	June 25, 1949	St. Laurent	August 19, 1965
Diane Griffin	Independent	Prince Edward Island	November 10, 2016	J. Trudeau	March 18, 2022
Thomas Heath Haviland	Conservative	Prince Edward Island	October 18, 1873	Macdonald	July 1, 1879
Robert Haythorne	Liberal	Queen's	October 18, 1873	Macdonald	May 7, 1891
George William Howlan	Liberal	Alberton	October 18, 1873; January 5, 1881; March 25, 1891	Macdonald	December 27, 1880; February 18, 1891; February 1, 1894
Elizabeth Hubley	Liberal	Prince Edward Island	March 8, 2001	Chrétien	September 8, 2017
James Joseph Hughes	Liberal	King's	September 5, 1925	King	March 5, 1941
Florence Elsie Inman	Liberal	Murray Harbour	July 28, 1955	St. Laurent	May 31, 1986
Archibald Johnstone	Liberal	Prince Edward Island	March 6, 1998	Chrétien	June 12, 1999
John Walter Jones	Liberal	Queen's	May 19, 1953	St. Laurent	March 31, 1954
Thomas Joseph Kickham	Liberal	Cardigan	July 8, 1966	Pearson	December 1, 1974
Creelman MacArthur	Liberal	Prince	September 5, 1925	King	December 27, 1943
Andrew Macdonald	Liberal-Conservative	Charlottetown	May 11, 1891	Macdonald	March 21, 1912
John Alexander Macdonald	Conservative	Cardigan	July 20, 1935	Bennett	November 15, 1948
John Joseph MacDonald	Progressive Conservative	Queen's	January 27, 1958	Diefenbaker	April 20, 1971
Heath MacQuarrie	Progressive Conservative	Hillsborough	October 3, 1979	Clark	September 18, 1994
James P. McIntyre	Liberal	Mount Stewart	February 19, 1943	King	April 8, 1957
John McLean	Conservative	Souris	December 3, 1915	Borden	February 20, 1936
Donald Montgomery	Conservative	Park Corner	October 18, 1873	Macdonald	July 31, 1893
Patrick Charles Murphy	Conservative	Tignish	November 20, 1912	Borden	March 6, 1925
Melvin Perry	Liberal	Prince Edward Island	August 11, 1999	Chrétien	August 23, 2000
Orville Howard Phillips	Progressive Conservative	Prince	February 5, 1963	Diefenbaker	March 24, 1999
Benjamin Charles Prowse	Liberal	Charlottetown	May 5, 1911	Laurier	February 22, 1930
Samuel Prowse	Liberal-Conservative	King's	September 14, 1889	MacDonald	January 14, 1902
James Edwin Robertson	Liberal	Prince Edward Island	February 7, 1902	Laurier	April 13, 1915
Brewer Waugh Robinson	Liberal	Summerside	April 19, 1945	King	January 20, 1949
Eileen Rossiter	Progressive Conservative	Prince Edward Island	November 17, 1986	Mulroney	July 14, 2004
John Ewen Sinclair	Liberal	Queen's	June 7, 1930	King	December 23, 1949
John Yeo	Liberal	East Prince	November 19, 1898	Laurier	December 14, 1924

Notes:

^{1} Senators are appointed to represent Prince Edward Island. Each senator may choose to designate a geographic area within Prince Edward Island as his or her division.
^{2} Senators are appointed by the governor general on the recommendation of the prime minister.

== Maritimes regional senators ==
Senators listed were appointed to represent the Maritimes under section 26 of the Constitution Act. This clause has only been used once before to appoint two extra senators to represent four regional Senate divisions: Ontario, Quebec, the Maritimes and the Western Provinces.

As vacancies open up among the normal members of the Senate, they are automatically filled by the regional senators. Regional senators may also designate themselves to a senate division in any province of their choosing in their region.

Name	Party^{1}	Division^{2}	Date appointed	Appointed by^{3}	Date shifted to provincial	Province shifted to	Provincial seat vacated by	End of term
Michael Forrestall	Conservative	Dartmouth/Eastern Shore, NS	September 27, 1990	Mulroney	November 10, 1994	Nova Scotia	Robert Muir	June 9, 2006
James W. Ross	Progressive Conservative	Maritimes divisional	September 27, 1990	Mulroney	April 26, 1991	New Brunswick	Richard Hatfield	May 25, 1993

Notes:

^{1} Party listed was the last party of which the senator was a member.
^{2} Senators are appointed to represent their region. Each senator may choose to designate a geographic area within their region as his or her division.
^{3} Senators are appointed by the governor general on the recommendation of the prime minister.

== See also ==
- Lists of Canadian senators
