= Chester McLure =

Canadian politician

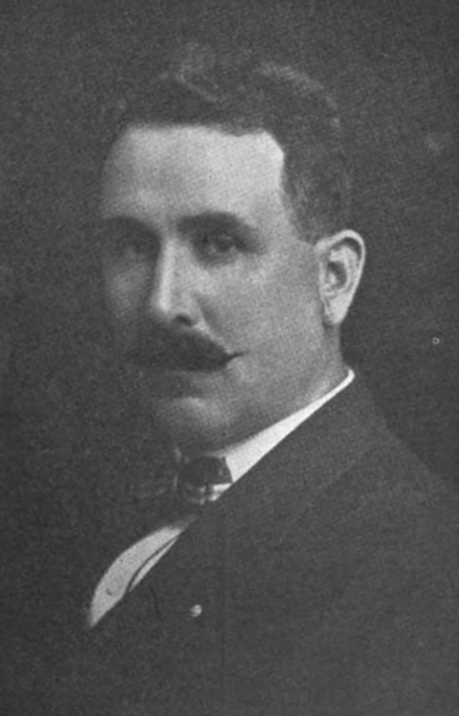

Member of the Legislative Assembly of Prince Edward Island for 5th Queens
- In office 1923–1930

Member of Parliament for Queen's
- In office July 1930 – October 1935
- Preceded by: Robert Harold Jenkins; John Ewen Sinclair
- Succeeded by: J. James Larabee; Peter Sinclair

Member of Parliament for Queen's
- In office June 1945 – August 1953
- Preceded by: Cyrus MacMillan
- Succeeded by: Angus MacLean; Neil Matheson

Personal details
- Born: Winfield Chester Scott McLure; 16 March 1875 North Rustico, Prince Edward Island
- Died: 18 June 1955 (aged 80)
- Party: Progressive Conservative; National Government; Conservative (1867–1942)
- Spouse(s): Lottie Evelyn Brehaut m. 25 June 1902
- Profession: Broker, teacher, trader

Winfield Chester Scott McLure (16 March 1875 – 18 June 1955) was a Progressive Conservative party, National Government and Conservative member of the House of Commons of Canada.

He was born in North Rustico, Prince Edward Island to a father who was a participant in the American Civil War (1861–1865). W. Chester S. McLure graduated with a teacher's certificate from Prince of Wales College and became a broker, salesman, men's clothing retailer, public school teacher and trader by career. For six years, he was a school principal at Gaytown and Alexandra.

His interest in fox farming since 1911 led to research and a book with Dr. J. C. Allan titled Theory and Practice of Fox Farming.

McLure was elected to the Legislative Assembly of Prince Edward Island in 1923 as a Conservative candidate for the 5th Queens riding and re-elected there for a second term in 1927.

After resigning from provincial politics, McLure was elected to Parliament as a Conservative party member at the Queen's riding in the 1930 federal election. After a term in the House of Commons, he was defeated by J. James Larabee and Peter Sinclair of the Liberal party in the 1935 election and again in 1940. McLure won Queen's in the 1945 election as a Progressive Conservative party candidate and returned to Parliament, and was re-elected in 1949. McLure was defeated in the 1953 election as the riding was won by Neil Matheson of the Liberals and Angus MacLean of the Progressive Conservatives who retained his seat.

McLure was also an Honorary Lieutenant-Colonel in 1930 for the 2nd Medium Light Artillery.
