= Donald Alexander MacKinnon =

Canadian politician

The Honourable Donald Alexander MacKinnon
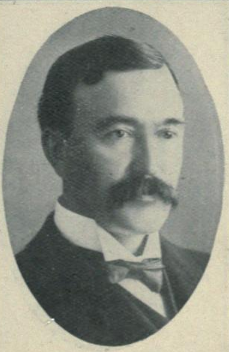

8th Lieutenant Governor of Prince Edward Island
- In office 3 October 1904 – 30 May 1910
- Monarchs: Edward VII; George V
- Governors General: The Earl of Minto; The Earl Grey
- Premier: Arthur Peters; Francis Haszard
- Preceded by: Peter Adolphus McIntyre
- Succeeded by: Benjamin Rogers

MLA (Assemblyman) for 4th Kings
- In office 13 December 1893 – 13 December 1899
- Preceded by: New District
- Succeeded by: Albert Prowse

Member of the Canadian Parliament for East Queen's
- In office 7 November 1900 – 3 November 1904
- Preceded by: Alexander Martin
- Succeeded by: Electoral district was abolished in 1903.

Member of the Canadian Parliament for Queen's
- In office 6 December 1921 – 29 October 1925 Serving with John Ewen Sinclair
- Preceded by: Donald Nicholson
- Succeeded by: Robert Harold Jenkins; John Albert Messervy

Personal details
- Born: 22 February 1863 Uigg, Prince Edward Island Colony
- Died: 20 April 1928 (aged 65) Charlottetown, Prince Edward Island, Dominion of Canada
- Party: Liberal
- Spouse: Adelaide Beatrice Louise (m. 1892)
- Children: Beatrice, Arthur, and a second son who died in childhood
- Education: Dalhousie Law School; Prince of Wales College
- Occupation: teacher, lawyer, author
- Profession: Politician
- Cabinet: Attorney General (1899-1900)

Donald Alexander MacKinnon (22 February 1863 – 20 April 1928) was a Canadian teacher, lawyer, politician, author, and the eighth Lieutenant Governor of Prince Edward Island from 1904 to 1910.

Born in Uigg, Prince Edward Island, the son of William and Catherine Nicholson Mackinnon, MacKinnon attended Uigg grammar school and started teaching when he was 14. He later received a first-class teaching licence from the Prince of Wales College in Charlottetown. In 1882, he started articling with the Charlottetown barrister Malcolm McLeod. From 1885 to 1887, he attended Dalhousie Law School where he received a Bachelor of Laws degree. He was called to the Bar an attorney in 1887 and a barrister in 1888. He was created a Queen's Counsel in 1899. He opened a practice in Georgetown, Prince Edward Island in 1887 where he remained until moving to Charlottetown in 1897. In 1900, he became president of the Law Society of Prince Edward Island.

From 1893 to 1900, he was a member of the Legislative Assembly of Prince Edward Island for the electoral district of 4th Kings. In 1899, he was chosen as attorney general in the cabinet of Donald Farquharson; however, as a result of the appointment, he was required to run for reelection and he was defeated.

He was elected to the House of Commons of Canada as the Liberal candidate for the electoral district of East Queen's in the 1900 federal election. In 1901, the election was declared void and MacKinnon was re-elected in the resulting 1901 by-election. In 1904, he was appointed Lieutenant Governor of Prince Edward Island and served until 1910. He returned to federal politics when he was elected to the House of Commons for electoral district of Queen's in the 1921 federal election. MacKinnon died in Charlottetown in 1928.
