= Angus McLean =

Angus McLean may refer to:

- Angus Wilton McLean (1870–1935), American banker, governor of North Carolina
- Angus McLean (footballer) (1925–1979), Welsh football player and manager
- Angus Alexander McLean (1854–1943), Canadian lawyer and politician, MP for Queen's, 1904–1908 and 1911–1917
- Angus MacLean (1914–2000), Canadian politician and farmer, MP for Queen's, 1951–1968 and Malpeque, 1968–1976
- Angus MacLean (British Columbia politician) (1891–1972)
