= Douglas Murray =

Douglas Murray may refer to:

- Douglas Murray (author) (born 1979), British political commentator and writer
- Doug Murray (comics) (born 1947), American fiction writer
- Douglas Murray (ice hockey) (born 1980), Swedish ice hockey player
- Douglas Murray (politician) (fl. c. 1980), Canadian politician
- Douglas Murray (sound editor), American sound editor
