= Ephraim Bell Muttart =

Canadian politician

Member of Parliament for King's County
- In office 1878–1882 Serving with Augustine Macdonald
- Preceded by: Daniel Davies; Peter A. McIntyre
- Succeeded by: Peter A. McIntyre; James Edwin Robertson

Personal details
- Born: March 7, 1839 Cape Traverse, Prince Edward Island, British North America
- Died: June 26, 1912 (aged 73) Souris, Prince Edward Island, Canada
- Party: Conservative
- Profession: physician

Ephraim Bell Muttart (March 7, 1839 – June 26, 1912) was a physician and political figure in Prince Edward Island, Canada. He represented King's County in the House of Commons of Canada from 1878 to 1882 as a Conservative member.

He was born in Cape Traverse, Prince Edward Island, the son of John Muttart, of German origin, and Elizabeth Bell, a Scottish immigrant. Muttart was educated in P.E.I., in Sackville, New Brunswick and at Harvard University, receiving his M.D. there in 1861. Muttart set up practice in Souris. In 1863, he married a Miss McDonald. Muttart also was coroner and was medical referee for the Standard and Canada Life Assurance companies. He was unsuccessful in bids for reelection in 1882 and 1887. He died in Souris, Prince Edward Island in 1912.

1887 Canadian federal election: King's County
Party	Candidate	Votes	%	Elected
Liberal	J.E. Robertson	2,434	–	X
Liberal	Peter Adolphus McIntyre	2,431	–	X
Conservative	Augustine Colin Macdonald	2,398	–	
Conservative	Ephraim Bell Muttart	2,355	–	

1878 Canadian federal election: King's County
Party	Candidate	Votes	%	Elected
Liberal–Conservative	Augustine Colin Macdonald	2,264	–	X
Conservative	Ephraim Bell Muttart	2,077	–	X
Liberal	Peter Adolphus McIntyre	1,499	–	
Unknown	Malcolm McFadyen	1,251	–	

1882 Canadian federal election: King's County
Party	Candidate	Votes	%	Elected
Liberal	Peter Adolphus McIntyre	2,124	–	X
Liberal	James Edwin Robertson	2,002	–	X
Liberal–Conservative	Augustine Colin Macdonald	1,941	–	
Conservative	Ephraim Bell Muttart	1,854	–	
