= Peter Sinclair Jr. =

Canadian politician (1887–1938)

Peter Sinclair

Member of Legislative Assembly of Prince Edward Island for 1st Queens
- In office 1927–1931

Member of Parliament for Queen's
- In office October 1935 – March 1938
- Preceded by: Chester McLure; John Howard Myers
- Succeeded by: James Lester Douglas; Cyrus Macmillan

Personal details
- Born: 13 November 1887 Summerfield, Prince Edward Island, Canada
- Died: 8 March 1938 (aged 50) Ottawa, Ontario, Canada
- Party: Liberal
- Spouse(s): Anna Campbell m. 23 December 1909
- Profession: farmer

Peter Sinclair (13 November 1887 – 8 March 1938) was a Liberal party member of the House of Commons of Canada. He was born in Summerfield, Prince Edward Island and became a farmer.

The son of Peter Sinclair and Margaret MacMurdo, Sinclair was educated in Springfield and farmed near Charlottetown.

Sinclair was a Liberal member of the Legislative Assembly of Prince Edward Island from 1927 until his defeat in the 1931 election, at the 1st Queens riding.

He was first elected to Parliament at the Queen's riding in the 1935 general election. Sinclair died on 8 March 1938 before completing his term in the 18th Canadian Parliament.
