= Donald Nicholson (Canadian politician) =

Canadian politician

Donald Nicholson MP

Member of Parliament for Queen's
- In office 1911–1921 Serving with Angus McLean, John Ewen Sinclair
- Preceded by: Lemuel Prowse, Alexander B. Warburton
- Succeeded by: Donald McKinnon

Personal details
- Born: March 20, 1850 Charlottetown, Prince Edward Island, British North America
- Died: April 30, 1932 (aged 82)
- Party: Conservative

Donald Nicholson (March 20, 1850 - April 30, 1932) was a Canadian politician, who served in the House of Commons of Canada from 1911 to 1921. He represented the Prince Edward Island electoral district of Queen's as a member of the Conservative Party from 1911 to 1917, and the Unionist Party from 1917 to 1921.

Prior to his election to the House of Commons, Nicholson was a tobacco merchant.

Nicholson built two houses on Fitzroy Street in Charlottetown, at house numbers 13 and 15, for his sons Edward and Robert. Both are designated as historic properties by the city of Charlottetown.

John Paton Nicholson, Robert's son and Donald's grandson, later became chief justice of the Supreme Court of Prince Edward Island.
