= Messervy =

Messervy is a surname. Notable people with the surname include:

- Frank Messervy (1893–1974), British soldier, first Commander-in-Chief of the Pakistan Army
- John Albert Messervy (1861–1928), Canadian industrialist
- William S. Messervy (1812–1886), American trader and politician

== Fictional ==
- M (James Bond), in full Vice Admiral Sir Miles Messervy KCMG, a fictional British spymaster
