= Kickham =

Kickham or Kickhams may refer to:

Surname

- Charles Kickham (1828–82) Irish republican ideologue and writer
- John Kickham (1847–1917) member of the Legislative Assembly of Prince Edward Island, Canada
- Mike Kickham (born 1988) Major League baseball player
- Thomas Joseph Kickham (1901–74) member of the Legislative Assembly of Prince Edward Island and the Canadian House of Commons

GAA clubs named after Charles Kickham

- Ballymun Kickhams GAA, Dublin city
- Knockavilla-Donaskeigh Kickhams GAA, Dundrum, South Tipperary
- Mullinahone-CJ Kickhams GAA, Mullinahone, South Tipperary
- Cooley Kickhams, Louth GAA
- Creggan Kickhams, Antrim GAA
- Ardoyne Kickhams, Belfast, Antrim GAA
- Wrensboro Kickhams, predecessor of Thurles Sarsfields, North Tipperary
- Riverstown Charles Kickhams, predecessor of Kildangan GAA (Tipperary)
