= Alexander Warburton =

Canadian politician

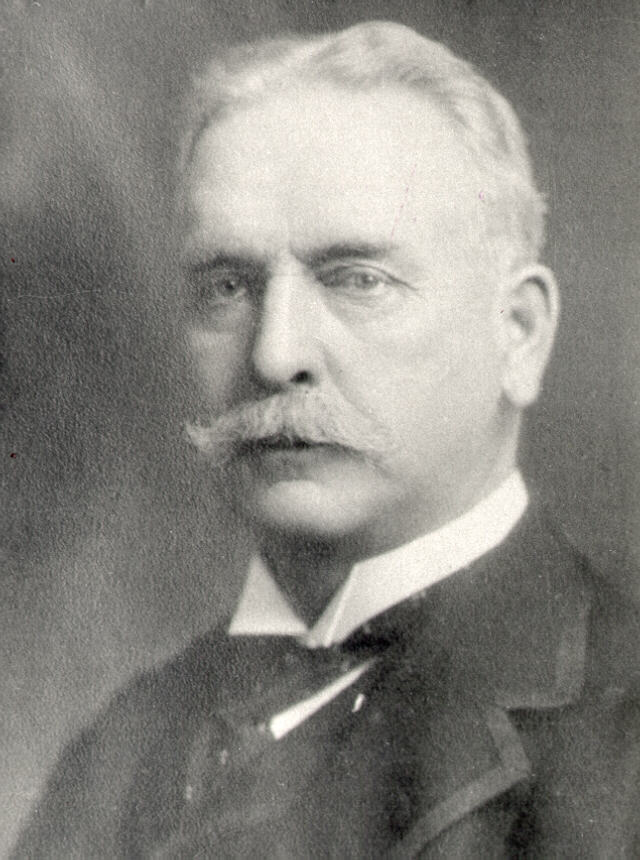

7th Premier of Prince Edward Island
- In office October 1, 1897 – August 1, 1898
- Monarch: Victoria
- Lieutenant Governor: George William Howlan
- Preceded by: Frederick Peters
- Succeeded by: Donald Farquharson

Leader of the Prince Edward Island Liberal Party
- In office October 1, 1897 – August 1, 1898
- Preceded by: Frederick Peters
- Succeeded by: Donald Farquharson

Member of the General Assembly of Prince Edward Island for 1st Queens
- In office May 29, 1891 – December 13, 1893 Serving with Peter Sinclair
- Preceded by: James Miller Sutherland
- Succeeded by: district abolished

MLA (Councillor) for 1st Queens
- In office December 13, 1893 – August 1, 1898
- Preceded by: himself
- Succeeded by: William Campbell

Member of Parliament for Queen's
- In office October 26, 1908 – September 21, 1911 Serving with Lemuel E. Prowse
- Preceded by: Angus A. McLean; Alexander Martin
- Succeeded by: Angus A. McLean; Donald Nicholson

Personal details
- Born: April 5, 1852 Summerside, Prince Edward Island
- Died: January 14, 1929 (aged 76) Charlottetown, Prince Edward Island
- Party: Liberal
- Other political affiliations: Liberal
- Spouse(s): Helen Margaret Davies (m. 1883) Isabella Cogswell Longworth (m. 1889)
- Children: 3
- Education: St. Dunstan's College; King's College; University of Edinburgh
- Occupation: lawyer, judge, and author
- Profession: Politician

Alexander Bannerman Warburton (April 5, 1852 – January 14, 1929) was a politician, jurist and author, who served as the seventh premier of Prince Edward Island, Canada.

Alexander was born in Summerside, the son of James Warburton, who was a member of the provincial assembly. Named after Lieut. Governor, Sir Alexander Bannerman, he was educated in Summerside, at St. Dunstan's College, King's College in Nova Scotia and the University of Edinburgh. He was called to the bar in 1879. He was a director for the Patriot Publishing Company and the Eastern Assurance Company of Canada.

Warburton was first elected to the province's House of Assembly in 1891 as a Liberal, and was re-elected in 1893 and 1897. He became premier of the province on October 27, 1897, when his predecessor resigned to move to British Columbia. Warburton only served in the position for eight months until resigning in June 1898 to accept a judicial appointment.

In the 1908 federal election, he was elected to the House of Commons of Canada as a Liberal Member of Parliament (MP), but lost his seat in the 1911 election that defeated the Laurier Liberals. He attempted to return to the House but was again defeated in the 1917 election. In 1920, Warburton returned to the bench as a judge on probate court and held that position until his death.

Warburton wrote two books on the history of the island, Prince Edward Island, Past and Present in 1905, and A History of Prince Edward Island published in 1923. Prior to entering politics, Warburton started a movement to beautify Charlottetown which resulting in the planting of more than 800 trees along main thoroughfares and in public squares, many of which stand to this day.
