= King's County (electoral district) =

Former federal electoral district in Prince Edward Island, Canada

Prince Edward Island electoral district

Defunct federal electoral district
- Legislature: House of Commons
- District created: 1873
- District abolished: 1892
- First contested: By-election 1873
- Last contested: 1891

King's County was a federal electoral district in Prince Edward Island, Canada, that was represented in the House of Commons of Canada from 1873 to 1896. This riding was created in 1873 when Prince Edward Island joined the Canadian Confederation. It was abolished in 1892 when it was redistributed into East Queen's and King's ridings.

It consisted of King's County, and elected two members.

== Election results ==
By-election on 29 September 1873 As a result of Prince Edward Island joining Confederation 1 July 1873
Party	Candidate	Votes
Conservative	Daniel Davies	acclaimed
Liberal–Conservative	Augustine Colin Macdonald	acclaimed

1874 Canadian federal election
Party	Candidate	Votes	%	Elected
Conservative	Daniel Davies	1,704	–	X
Liberal	Peter Adolphus McIntyre	1,530	–	X
Liberal–Conservative	Augustine Colin Macdonald	1,496	–	
lop.parl.ca

1878 Canadian federal election
Party	Candidate	Votes	%	Elected
Liberal–Conservative	Augustine Colin Macdonald	2,264	–	X
Conservative	Ephraim Bell Muttart	2,077	–	X
Liberal	Peter Adolphus McIntyre	1,499	–	
Unknown	Malcolm McFadyen	1,251	–	

1882 Canadian federal election
Party	Candidate	Votes	%	Elected
Liberal	Peter Adolphus McIntyre	2,124	–	X
Liberal	James Edwin Robertson	2,002	–	X
Liberal–Conservative	Augustine Colin Macdonald	1,941	–	
Conservative	Ephraim Bell Muttart	1,854	–	

By-election on 26 April 1883 Mr. Robertson was declared not duly elected on the grounds that he was a member of the Prince Edward Island Legislative Assembly at the time of the election. The seat was adjudicated to Mr. MacDonald.
Party	Candidate	Votes
Liberal–Conservative	Augustine Colin Macdonald	acclaimed

1887 Canadian federal election
Party	Candidate	Votes	%	Elected
Liberal	J.E. Robertson	2,434	–	X
Liberal	Peter Adolphus McIntyre	2,431	–	X
Conservative	Augustine Colin Macdonald	2,398	–	
Conservative	Ephraim Bell Muttart	2,355	–	

1891 Canadian federal election
Party	Candidate	Votes	%	Elected
Conservative	John McLean	2,624	–	X
Conservative	Augustine Colin Macdonald	2,514	–	X
Liberal	Peter Adolphus McIntyre	2,369	–	
Liberal	James Edwin Robertson	2,276	–	

== See also ==
- List of Canadian electoral districts
- Historical federal electoral districts of Canada
