= Malcolm McFadyen =

Canadian politician

Member of the Legislative Assembly of Prince Edward Island
- In office 1882–1883
- Preceded by: William A. Poole
- Succeeded by: Angus MacLeod
- Constituency: 4th Kings

Personal details
- Born: June 9, 1838 Lake Ainslie, Nova Scotia, Canada
- Died: 15 April 1883 (aged 44)
- Party: Liberal

Malcolm McFadyen (9 June 1838 – c. 15 April 1883) was a Canadian politician, who represented 4th Kings in the Legislative Assembly of Prince Edward Island from 1882 to 1886. He was a member of the Prince Edward Island Liberal Party. A school teacher, farmer and general merchant in Murray Harbour, Prince Edward Island, McFadyen ran unsuccessfully in the 1876 provincial election, the 1878 federal election and the 1879 provincial election before being elected in the 1882 provincial election.

During his term he became embroiled in a controversy when James Edwin Robertson was declared ineligible for election to the House of Commons of Canada after winning a seat in the 1882 federal election, on the grounds that he was still a sitting member of Prince Edward Island's legislative assembly, and therefore ineligible to run in the federal election. According to Robertson, in accordance with the process for resigning from the legislature he had submitted his resignation notice to two fellow MLAs, McFadyen and Peter McLaren, but a procedural error in McFadyen and McLaren's handling of the document had left the resignation improperly registered.

1878 Canadian federal election: King's County
Party	Candidate	Votes	%	Elected
Liberal–Conservative	Augustine Colin Macdonald	2,264	–	X
Conservative	Ephraim Bell Muttart	2,077	–	X
Liberal	Peter Adolphus McIntyre	1,499	–	
Unknown	Malcolm McFadyen	1,251	–	
