= Alexander Martin (Canadian politician) =

Canadian politician

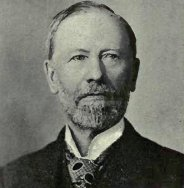

Member of the Legislative Assembly of Prince Edward Island for 4th Queens
- In office 1884–1886

Member of the Legislative Council of Prince Edward Island for 2nd Queen's District
- In office 1886–1890

Member of the Canadian Parliament for East Queen's
- In office 1896–1900
- Preceded by: District was created in 1892
- Succeeded by: Donald Alexander MacKinnon

Member of the Canadian Parliament for Queen's
- In office 1904–1908 Serving with Angus Alexander McLean
- Preceded by: District was created in 1903
- Succeeded by: Lemuel E. Prowse & Alexander Warburton

Personal details
- Born: March 14, 1842 Springton, Prince Edward Island
- Died: April 13, 1921 (aged 79)
- Party: Conservative

Alexander Martin (March 14, 1842 – April 13, 1921) was a Canadian politician.

Born in Springton, Prince Edward Island, the son of Alex and Isabelle Martin, Martin was educated at the Common Schools, the Normal School and Prince of Wales College. In 1868, he married Annie McLeod. A farmer and merchant by occupation, he was elected to the Legislative Assembly of Prince Edward Island for 4th Queens in an 1884 by-election held following the death of Angus D. MacMillan. Martin ran unsuccessfully for reelection to the provincial assembly in 1886, 1890 and 1893. He was elected to the Legislative Council of Prince Edward Island for 2nd Queens in the 1886 general election. Martin supported the abolition of the province's Legislative Council, which occurred in 1893. He later moved to Valleyfield, where he farmed and operated a general store. Martin also taught school for nine years.

A Conservative, he was elected to the House of Commons of Canada for the electoral district of East Queen's in the general elections of 1896 and, in 1900, he lost the seat on a recount before a judge. He was an unsuccessful candidate at a by-election held in 1901, but was elected again in the general elections of 1904. He was defeated in 1908 and again in 1917. He died in Valleyfield at the age of 79.
