= Tracadie, Prince Edward Island =

Tracadie is a Canadian rural community in Queens County, Prince Edward Island. It is located southwest of Mount Stewart. The name Tracadie, which is of Mi'kmaq origin, means "ideal camping location" and is pronounced tǔlakǎdǐk.

This community is located on the scenic north shore of P.E.I., on Tracadie Bay and is also close to the Hillsborough River. It is largely a farming community and there are also mussel farms found in Tracadie Bay. The heart of the community contains a community centre, elementary school, Catholic church, ball diamond, outdoor rink and a seniors housing complex. Tracadie is close to Charlottetown, the cultural hub of P.E.I. Every summer in August, the community celebrates Tracadie Days.

John Alexander MacDonald, a former member of the Canadian House of Commons and the Canadian Senate, was born in Tracadie in 1874. Sir William Christopher Macdonald was born in Tracadie in 1831, he went on to become a tobacco manufacturer and major education philanthropist.
