= James Bernard Fay =

Canadian politician

James Bernard Fay (born September 23, 1947) was a farmer and political figure on Prince Edward Island. He represented 1st Kings in the Legislative Assembly of Prince Edward Island from 1976 to 1979 as a Liberal.

He was born in Charlottetown, the son of John Brady Fay and Margaret Theresa Ellsworth. Fay worked as a federal potato inspector for Kings County. He was first elected to the legislative assembly in a 1976 by-election held after Melvin J. McQuaid was named a judge. Fay was reelected in the 1978 general election but defeated in 1979. He served in the provincial cabinet as minister without portfolio and as Minister of Justice. After he retired from politics, he was a political advisor for Eugene Whelan. During his time in Ottawa, from 1979-1984 Fay became a voice to Eugene Whelan who was Minister of Agriculture Canada and to Jean Chrétien who was Minister of Justice and Attorney General Canada. Helping them create the Canadian Charter of Rights and Freedoms, ending the Cold War, playing a role in fall of the Iron Curtain, and allowing inter-provincial movement of feed.1 Fay later moved to Fort McMurray, Alberta, where he worked for an oil company and then owned a taxi company.
