= Angus Alexander McLean =

Canadian politician

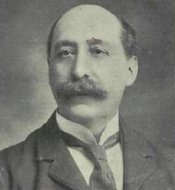

Member of the Canadian Parliament for Queen's
- In office 1904–1908 Serving with Alexander Martin
- Preceded by: District was created in 1903
- Succeeded by: Lemuel E. Prowse; Alexander Warburton
- In office 1911–1917 Serving with Donald Nicholson
- Preceded by: Lemuel E. Prowse; Alexander Warburton
- Succeeded by: John Ewen Sinclair

Member of the Legislative Assembly of Prince Edward Island for 4th Queens
- In office 1888–1893

Personal details
- Born: December 17, 1854 Belfast, Prince Edward Island
- Died: April 3, 1943 (aged 88)
- Party: Conservative

Angus Alexander McLean, KC (December 17, 1854 – April 3, 1943) was a Canadian lawyer and politician.

Born in Belfast, Prince Edward Island, the son of William McLean. McLean was educated at the Prince of Wales College, Charlottetown, and the Harvard Law School. A lawyer and King's Counsel, he was married to Leah Yeo, daughter of John Yeo, from 1882 to her death in 1897. His second wife was Frances H. Longworth.

He was a law clerk of the Prince Edward Legislature for eight years. In 1894, he was appointed Revising Officer for East Queen's and was an official Assignee under the Dominion Insolvency Act for five years. In 1904, he was elected President of the Prince Edward Island Law Society.

McLean was a Conservative member of the Legislative Assembly of Prince Edward Island for 4th Queens from 1888 until 1900. He ran unsuccessfully for the House of Commons of Canada in a 1902 and 1904 by-elections for West Queen's. A Conservative, he was first elected in the general elections of 1904 for Queen's and was defeated in 1908. He was re-elected in 1911 and did not run in 1917.
