= Peter Adolphus McIntyre =

Canadian politician (1840–1910)

The Honourable Peter Adolphus McIntyre
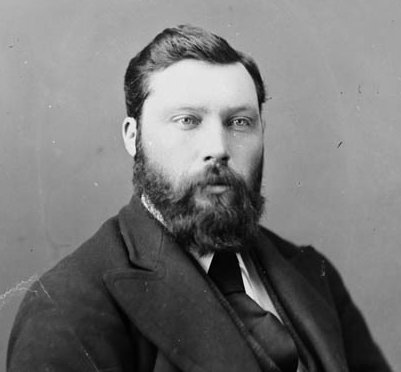

7th Lieutenant Governor of Prince Edward Island
- In office 23 May 1899 – 3 October 1904
- Monarchs: Victoria; Edward VII
- Governor General: The Earl of Minto
- Premier: Donald Farquharson; Arthur Peters
- Preceded by: George William Howlan
- Succeeded by: Donald Alexander MacKinnon

Member of the Canadian Parliament for King's County
- In office 22 January 1874 – 17 September 1878 Serving with Daniel Davies
- Preceded by: Augustine Colin Macdonald
- Succeeded by: Augustine Colin Macdonald; Ephraim Bell Muttart
- In office 20 June 1882 – 5 March 1891 Serving with James Edwin Robertson
- Preceded by: Augustine Colin Macdonald; Ephraim Bell Muttart
- Succeeded by: Augustine Colin Macdonald; John McLean

Personal details
- Born: 19 July 1840 Peterville, Prince Edward Island Colony
- Died: 16 July 1910 (aged 69) Souris, Prince Edward Island, Dominion of Canada
- Party: Liberal
- Spouses: Agnes McDonald (m. 1871) Barbara Rigg (m. 1886)
- Education: Quebec Seminary; Laval University; McGill University; Saint Dunstan's University
- Occupation: public servant, physician and coroner
- Profession: Politician

Peter Adolphus McIntyre (19 July 1840 – 16 July 1910) was a Canadian politician, public servant, physician and coroner.

Born at Peterville in Kings County, Prince Edward Island, McIntyre's paternal grandfather came to Canada from Scotland around 1785 and settled at Cable Head, PEI. McIntyre's great-grandfather on his mother's side fought under General Wolfe at the Battle of the Plains of Abraham in 1759.

McIntyre was educated at the Quebec Seminary, Laval University and McGill University where he earned his medical degree in 1867. He returned to Prince Edward Island to begin his practice. He served as Kings County coroner for several years.

In 1872 he was appointed one of the commissioners overlooking the construction of the Prince Edward Island Railway and was railway commander.

Following Prince Edward Island's entry into Canadian Confederation which occurred, in part, as a result of the debt incurred by the colony for the railway's construction, McIntyre was elected in the 1874 federal election to the House of Commons of Canada as a Liberal Member of Parliament for Kings County. He was defeated in the 1878 federal election but regained his seat in 1882 and was re-elected in 1887. After being defeated in the next two elections, McIntyre was appointed the seventh Lieutenant Governor of Prince Edward Island by the Laurier government in 1899. He served in office until 1904 and died six years later in Souris, P.E.I.

1874 Canadian federal election: King's County
Party	Candidate	Votes	%	Elected
Conservative	Daniel Davies	1,704	–	X
Liberal	Peter Adolphus McIntyre	1,530	–	X
Liberal–Conservative	Augustine Colin Macdonald	1,496	–	
lop.parl.ca

1878 Canadian federal election: King's County
Party	Candidate	Votes	%	Elected
Liberal–Conservative	Augustine Colin Macdonald	2,264	–	X
Conservative	Ephraim Bell Muttart	2,077	–	X
Liberal	Peter Adolphus McIntyre	1,499	–	
Unknown	Malcolm McFadyen	1,251	–	

1882 Canadian federal election: King's County
Party	Candidate	Votes	%	Elected
Liberal	Peter Adolphus McIntyre	2,124	–	X
Liberal	James Edwin Robertson	2,002	–	X
Liberal–Conservative	Augustine Colin Macdonald	1,941	–	
Conservative	Ephraim Bell Muttart	1,854	–	

1887 Canadian federal election: King's County
Party	Candidate	Votes	%	Elected
Liberal	J.E. Robertson	2,434	–	X
Liberal	Peter Adolphus McIntyre	2,431	–	X
Conservative	Augustine Colin Macdonald	2,398	–	
Conservative	Ephraim Bell Muttart	2,355	–	

1891 Canadian federal election: King's County
Party	Candidate	Votes	%	Elected
Conservative	John McLean	2,624	–	X
Conservative	Augustine Colin Macdonald	2,514	–	X
Liberal	Peter Adolphus McIntyre	2,369	–	
Liberal	James Edwin Robertson	2,276	–	
