= East Queen's =

Former federal electoral district in Prince Edward Island, Canada

Prince Edward Island electoral district

Defunct federal electoral district
- Legislature: House of Commons
- District created: 1892
- District abolished: 1903
- First contested: 1896
- Last contested: By-election 1901

East Queen's was a federal electoral district in Prince Edward Island, Canada, that was represented in the House of Commons of Canada from 1896 to 1904. This riding was created in 1892 from parts of King's County and Queen's County ridings. It was abolished in 1903 when it was redistributed into King's and Queen's ridings.

It consisted of the eastern part of Queen's County and parts of King's County.

== Election results ==
1896 Canadian federal election
Party	Candidate	Votes
Conservative	MARTIN, A.	2,175
Liberal	WELSH, William	1,821

1900 Canadian federal election
Party	Candidate	Votes
Liberal	MCKINNON, D.A.	2,257
Conservative	MARTIN, Alexander	2,250

By-election: On election being declared void, 11 February 1901

By-election on 20 March 1901
Party	Candidate	Votes
Liberal	MCKINNON, D.A.	2,433
Conservative	MARTIN, Alex.	2,039

== See also ==
- List of Canadian electoral districts
- Historical federal electoral districts of Canada
