= John Alexander Macdonald (Prince Edward Island politician) =

Canadian politician

The Hon. John Alexander Macdonald
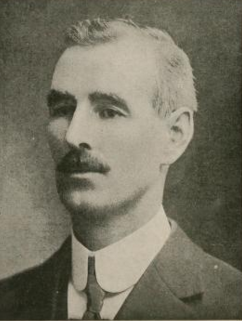

Senator for Cardigan, Prince Edward Island
- In office July 20, 1935 – November 15, 1948
- Appointed by: R. B. Bennett

Member of the Canadian Parliament for King's
- In office 1925–1935
- Preceded by: James Joseph Hughes
- Succeeded by: Thomas Vincent Grant

Member of the Legislative Assembly of Prince Edward Island for 3rd Kings
- In office 1923–1925
- In office 1908–1915

Personal details
- Born: April 12, 1874 Tracadie, Prince Edward Island, Canada
- Died: November 15, 1948 (aged 74)
- Party: Conservative
- Other political affiliations: Prince Edward Island Progressive Conservative Party
- Relations: Margaret Mary Macdonald, daughter-in-law
- Children: John Augustine
- Cabinet: Minister Without Portfolio (1926 & 1930-1935); Minister of Public Works and Highways (1923-1925); Minister Without Portfolio (1911-1915)

John Alexander Macdonald, PC (April 12, 1874 – November 15, 1948) was a Canadian politician.

Born in Tracadie, Prince Edward Island, the son of John Charles Macdonald, he represented 3rd Kings in the Legislative Assembly of Prince Edward Island from 1908 to 1915 and from 1923 to 1925 as a Conservative member. Macdonald served in the provincial cabinet as Minister without Portfolio from 1911 to 1915 and as Minister of Public Works and Highways from 1923 to 1925. He was first elected to the House of Commons of Canada in the riding of King's in the 1925 federal election. A Conservative, he was re-elected in 1926 and 1930. Macdonald was a Minister without Portfolio in the federal cabinet in 1926 and from 1930 to 1935. In 1935, he was appointed to the Senate of Canada representing the senatorial division of Cardigan, Prince Edward Island. He served until his death in Cardigan in 1948.

Macdonald was a merchant, exporter and shipbuilder. He also was a director of the Cardigan Electric Company, the Cardigan Silver Fox Company Limited and the Georgetown Fish Company. In 1905, he married Marie Josephine MacDonald.

His son John Augustine also represented the riding of King's in the House of Commons. John Augustine's wife Margaret Mary was the first woman from Prince Edward Island to serve in the House of Commons.
