= Neil Matheson =

Canadian politician

Member of Parliament for Queen's
- In office August 1953 – June 1957 Serving with Angus MacLean
- Preceded by: Chester McLure
- Succeeded by: Heath MacQuarrie

Personal details
- Born: Neil Alexander Matheson; 25 August 1904 Rose Valley, Prince Edward Island, Canada
- Died: 1 April 1972 (aged 67)
- Party: Liberal
- Spouse: Margaret McLeod Miller (m. 1934)
- Profession: editor, farmer, journalist

Neil Alexander Matheson (25 August 1904 – 1 April 1972) was a Liberal party member of the House of Commons of Canada. He was born in Rose Valley, Prince Edward Island and was also an editor, farmer and journalist.

He obtained a Bachelor of Arts degree at Mount Allison University. During World War II, he was a captain in the reserves.

Matheson was first elected with Angus MacLean at the Queen's electoral district in the 1953 general election, when that riding elected two members to Parliament. In the 1957 election, he was defeated when MacLean and fellow Progressive Conservative party candidate Heath MacQuarrie received the two highest votes.
