= John Augustine Macdonald =

Canadian politician

Member of Parliament for King's
- In office June 1957 – January 1961
- Preceded by: Thomas Joseph Kickham
- Succeeded by: Margaret Mary Macdonald

Personal details
- Born: 4 February 1913 Cardigan, Prince Edward Island
- Died: 4 January 1961 (aged 47)
- Party: Progressive Conservative
- Spouse: Margaret Smith (m. 1941)
- Profession: merchant, produce dealer

John Augustine Macdonald (4 February 1913 – 4 January 1961) was a Progressive Conservative party member of the House of Commons of Canada. He was born in Cardigan, Prince Edward Island becoming a potato grower, general merchant, produce dealer by career.

His father was John Alexander Macdonald, a provincial politician then a federal Member of Parliament and Senator. The younger Macdonald served in World War II, commanding the Prince Edward Island Regiment. He was injured at Normandy in July 1944 and returned to Prince Edward Island. He won a seat at the 3rd Kings riding in a 1945 provincial by-election despite remaining in hospital recovering from his war injuries. He lost his riding in the 1947 provincial election, but returned to the provincial legislature in a 1951 election victory after which he became his party's whip and finance critic.

As a merchant, Macdonald became J. A. MacDonald & Co. Ltd.'s President and was a director for Associated Shippers, Inc. He also served on various boards and associations.

Macdonald was first elected to the House of Commons of Canada at King's riding in the 1957 general election and re-elected there in the 1958 election. Macdonald made two previous unsuccessful attempts to win a seat at King's in the 1949 and 1953 elections.

Macdonald died at his home in Cardigan, Prince Edward Island on the morning of 4 January 1961, during his term in the 24th Parliament. His wife, Margaret Mary Macdonald, succeeded him as the Member of Parliament for King's in a by-election later that year.
