= James Edwin Robertson =

Canadian politician (1840-1915)

The Hon. James Edwin Robertson
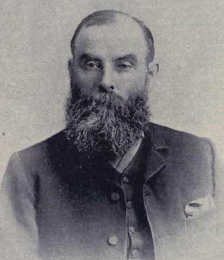

Senator for Prince Edward Island
- In office 1902–1915
- Appointed by: Wilfrid Laurier

Personal details
- Born: October 8, 1840 New Perth, Prince Edward Island
- Died: October 30, 1915 (aged 75)
- Party: Liberal

James Edwin Robertson (October 8, 1840 – October 30, 1915) was a Canadian physician and politician.

He was born in New Perth, Prince Edward Island, as the son of Peter Robertson and Annie McFarlane. Robertson received his education at McGill University where he graduated with honors in 1865. After his graduation, he established a successful medical practice in Montague, Prince Edward Island.

In 1870, Robertson was acclaimed to the Legislative Assembly of Prince Edward Island for 4th Kings district. He was re-elected in 1876 but faced defeat in 1879. However, he was re-elected in 1882. During his tenure, he served as a Minister Without Portfolio in the cabinets of Robert Poore Haythorne and Louis Henry Davies.

In the 1882 election, he was elected to the House of Commons of Canada, representing King's County.

== Unseating ==
In 1883, he was declared not duly elected on the grounds that he was a member of the Prince Edward Island Legislative Assembly at the time of the election, which violated the law prohibiting dual mandates. Shortly after winning his federal seat, he had submitted his resignation notice from the provincial legislature to two fellow MLAs, Malcolm McFadyen and Peter McLaren, in accordance with the process for resigning from the legislature, and the legislature had already held a by-election to replace him. However, a procedural error by McFadyen and McLaren had left the resignation not properly registered, thus leaving his provincial office technically double-seated and his eligibility for federal office in doubt. While several Canadian provinces did at the time allow people to simultaneously hold seats in both the provincial and federal legislatures, Prince Edward Island had enacted a law explicitly disallowing this.

The federal committee adjudicating the matter was dominated by the governing Conservative Party, whereas Robertson was a Liberal. The committee ruled that his resignation from the provincial legislature was not valid, and voted to unseat Robertson; rather than holding a by-election, the committee directly awarded the seat to Augustine Macdonald, the Conservative candidate whom Robertson had defeated in the federal election.

He was re-elected in 1887, but faced defeat again in 1891.

== Senate appointment ==
In 1902, he was appointed to the Senate of Canada by Wilfrid Laurier, representing the senatorial division of Prince Edward Island. He served in the Senate until April 1915.

1891 Canadian federal election: King's County
Party	Candidate	Votes	%	Elected
Conservative	John McLean	2,624	–	X
Conservative	Augustine Colin Macdonald	2,514	–	X
Liberal	Peter Adolphus McIntyre	2,369	–	
Liberal	James Edwin Robertson	2,276	–	

Parliament of Canada
Preceded by Augustine Macdonald; Ephraim Bell Muttart	Member of Parliament for King's County with Peter Adolphus McIntyre; 1882–1883	Succeeded by Peter A. McIntyre; Augustine Macdonald
Preceded by Peter A. McIntyre; Augustine Macdonald	Member of Parliament for King's County with Peter Adolphus McIntyre; 1887–1891	Succeeded by John McLean; Augustine Macdonald
