= Margaret Mary Macdonald =

Canadian politician

Member of Parliament for King's
- In office 1961–1963
- Preceded by: John Augustine Macdonald
- Succeeded by: John Mullally

Personal details
- Born: November 11, 1910 Halifax, Nova Scotia, Canada
- Died: February 3, 1968 (aged 57)
- Party: Progressive Conservative
- Occupation: teacher, secretary

Margaret Mary Macdonald (November 11, 1910 – February 3, 1968) was a Canadian politician. On May 29, 1961 she became the first woman to represent Prince Edward Island in the House of Commons of Canada.

She first won representation for the electoral district of King's at the House of Commons in a by-election in 1961, a seat vacated by the death of her husband John Augustine Macdonald. Macdonald retained her seat in the 1962 federal election. She was defeated by Liberal John Mullally in the 1963 federal election.
