= James Lester Douglas =

Canadian politician

Member of Parliament for Queen's
- In office March 1940 – September 1950
- Preceded by: Charles Avery Dunning; Peter Sinclair
- Succeeded by: Angus MacLean

Personal details
- Born: James Lester Douglas; 29 November 1881 Head of Hillsborough, Prince Edward Island, Canada
- Died: 30 September 1950 (aged 68)
- Party: Liberal
- Spouse: Mabel Wright
- Profession: exporter, farmer

James Lester Douglas (29 November 1881 – 30 September 1950) was a Liberal party member of the House of Commons of Canada. He was born in Head of Hillsborough, Prince Edward Island, the son of Elisha Albert Douglas and Emma Louise Coffin. He became an exporter and farmer by career.

He was educated at Charlottetown Business College. In 1910, Douglas received a Royal Humane Society Medal for life saving. He married Mabel Amanda Wright (1898–1969) on 17 May 1927.

He was first elected to Parliament at the Queen's riding in the 1940 general election and re-elected there in the 1945 and 1949 elections. Douglas died on 30 September 1950 before completing his term in the 21st Canadian Parliament.
