= John McLean (Canadian politician) =

Canadian politician

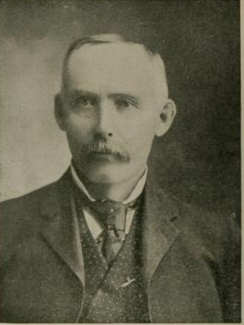
John McLean

John McLean (September 24, 1846 – February 20, 1936) was a merchant and political figure in Prince Edward Island. He represented King's County in the House of Commons of Canada from 1891 to 1896 as a Conservative member. McLean represented Souris division in the Senate of Canada from 1915 until his death.

He was born in Mount Herbert, the son of Daniel McLean, and was educated at Prince of Wales College. In 1852, he married Matilda Jane Jury. McLean represented 1st Kings in the Legislative Assembly of Prince Edward Island from 1882 to 1891, from 1900 to 1904 and from 1908 to 1915. He was an unsuccessful candidate for the riding of King's in the House of Commons in 1904. He served in the provincial Executive Council as a Minister without Portfolio from 1911 to 1915.

He died in Souris at the age of 89.

His son Harry and his grandson John Robert McLean also served in the provincial assembly.

1891 Canadian federal election: King's County
Party	Candidate	Votes	%	Elected
Conservative	John McLean	2,624	–	X
Conservative	Augustine Colin Macdonald	2,514	–	X
Liberal	Peter Adolphus McIntyre	2,369	–	
Liberal	James Edwin Robertson	2,276	–	
