= Daniel Davies (Canadian politician) =

Canadian politician

Daniel Davies (January 18, 1825 – May 11, 1911) was a Canadian merchant and political figure. He represented King's County in the House of Commons of Canada from 1873 to 1878 as a Conservative.

He was born in Charlottetown, Prince Edward Island and educated there. He went to sea at the age of 16 and later became a shipbuilder and ship owner. In 1853, he married Catherine Cameron. Davies represented Charlottetown in the Legislative Assembly of Prince Edward Island from 1859 to 1866 as a Liberal member, serving as a member of the Executive Council from 1864 to 1866. He retired from politics in 1878. He served as a magistrate for a number of years and was also a director of the Bank of Prince Edward Island and the Charlottetown gas company. Davies was president of the P.E.I. Steam Navigation Co. and the Merchants Marine Insurance Company of Charlottetown. Cameron died in Charlottetown at the age of 86.

By-election on 29 September 1873 As a result of Prince Edward Island joining Confederation 1 July 1873
Party	Candidate	Votes
Conservative	Daniel Davies	acclaimed
Liberal–Conservative	Augustine Colin Macdonald	acclaimed

1874 Canadian federal election: King's County
Party	Candidate	Votes	%	Elected
Conservative	Daniel Davies	1,704	–	X
Liberal	Peter Adolphus McIntyre	1,530	–	X
Liberal–Conservative	Augustine Colin Macdonald	1,496	–	
lop.parl.ca
