= Melvin McQuaid =

Canadian politician

Melvin James McQuaid
- Official 1968 portrait

MLA (Councillor) for 1st Kings
- In office 1 September 1959 – 10 December 1962
- Preceded by: Brenton St. John
- Succeeded by: Daniel J. MacDonald
- In office 4 December 1972 – 1 July 1976
- Preceded by: Daniel J. MacDonald
- Succeeded by: James Bernard Fay

Member of Parliament for King's
- In office 8 November 1965 – 25 June 1968
- Preceded by: John Mullally
- Succeeded by: riding dissolved

Member of Parliament for Cardigan
- In office 25 June 1968 – 1 September 1972
- Preceded by: riding created
- Succeeded by: Daniel J. MacDonald

Leader of the Progressive Conservative Party of Prince Edward Island
- In office 2 February 1973 – 1 July 1976
- Preceded by: George Key
- Succeeded by: Lloyd MacPhail (interim)

Personal details
- Born: 6 September 1911 Souris, Prince Edward Island
- Died: 16 January 2001 (aged 89)
- Party: Progressive Conservative
- Spouse: Catherine Handrahan (m. 15 September 1947, predeceased)
- Profession: lawyer, clerk

Melvin James McQuaid (6 September 1911 – 16 January 2001) was a Progressive Conservative party member of the House of Commons of Canada. He was born in Souris, Prince Edward Island and became a lawyer and clerk by career.

McQuaid attended Saint Dunstan's University, St. Francis Xavier University and Dalhousie Law School.

In 1957, he became town clerk for Souris. He served in provincial politics as a Councillor of the Legislative Assembly of Prince Edward Island for 1st Kings District from 1959 to 1962, including functions as provincial treasurer and Attorney General.

He was first elected at the King's riding in the 1965 general election, and re-elected at the Cardigan riding in the 1968 election.

After serving his terms in the 27th and 28th Canadian Parliaments, McQuaid returned to provincial politics to become leader of the provincial Progressive Conservative party which was the Opposition party. He once again became a Councillor for the 1st Kings electoral district from 1972 until 1976. After leaving provincial office, McQuaid was appointed a judge of the Supreme Court of Prince Edward Island. After his retirement from the court in 1981, he served on the National Parole Board.

== Electoral record ==
1968 Canadian federal election: Cardigan
Party	Candidate	Votes	%
Progressive Conservative	Melvin McQuaid	5,717	49.53
Liberal	John Mullally	5,623	48.75
New Democratic	Spurgeon Joseph Hazelden	203	1.76
Total valid votes		11,543	100.00
