= Doreen Sark =

Canadian politician

Leader of the New Democratic Party of Prince Edward Island Interim
- In office 1979–1981
- Preceded by: Aquinas Ryan
- Succeeded by: Douglas Murray

Personal details
- Party: New Democratic Party

Doreen Sark is a former Canadian politician who served as the interim leader of the Prince Edward Island New Democratic Party from 1979 to 1981. During the 1979 provincial election, she led the party and became the first woman ever to lead a political party in the province during an election campaign.

1974 Canadian federal election: Malpeque
Party	Candidate	Votes	%	±%
Progressive Conservative	Angus MacLean	5,649	50.61	-2.92
Liberal	John W. MacNaught	4,975	44.57	+2.62
New Democratic	Doreen Sark	537	4.81	+0.29
Total valid votes		11,161	100.00	
