= Queen's (Prince Edward Island federal electoral district) =

Former federal electoral district in Prince Edward Island, Canada

Prince Edward Island electoral district

Defunct federal electoral district
- Legislature: House of Commons
- District created: 1903
- District abolished: 1966
- First contested: 1904
- Last contested: 1965

Queen's was a federal electoral district in Prince Edward Island, Canada, that was represented in the House of Commons of Canada from 1904 to 1968.

== History ==
This riding was created in 1903 from parts of East Prince, East Queen's and West Queen's ridings.

It was abolished in 1966 when it was redistributed into Cardigan, Hillsborough and Malpeque ridings, to take effect at the time of the next election (which took place in 1968).

It consisted of the County of Queen's and elected two members.

In 1914, it was redefined to elect only one member until the British North America Act, 1867, was amended to entitle the province of Prince Edward Island to four members. When that was done, before the next election, Queen's again was entitled to elect two members.

It continued to have two members until it was abolished in 1966. Queen's and the riding of Halifax were the last two multi-member ridings used in Canadian elections.

It elected its MPs through Block Voting.

=== Members of Parliament ===
This riding has elected the following members of Parliament:

Parliament	Years	Member	Party	Member	Party
Queen's
10th	1904–1908	Angus Alexander McLean	Conservative	Alexander Martin	Conservative
11th	1908–1911	Lemuel Prowse	Liberal	Alexander B. Warburton	Liberal
12th	1911–1917	Angus Alexander McLean	Conservative	Donald Nicholson	Conservative
13th	1917–1921	John Ewen Sinclair	Opposition (Laurier Liberals)	Donald Nicholson	Government (Unionist)
14th	1921–1925	John Ewen Sinclair	Liberal	Donald Alexander MacKinnon	Liberal
15th	1925–1926	Robert Harold Jenkins	Liberal	John Albert Messervy	Conservative
16th	1926–1930	Robert Harold Jenkins	Liberal	John Ewen Sinclair	Liberal
17th	1930–1935	Chester McLure	Conservative	John Howard Myers	Conservative
18th	1935	James Larabee	Liberal	Peter Sinclair	Liberal
18th	1935–1940	Charles Avery Dunning	Liberal	Peter Sinclair	Liberal
19th	1940–1945	Cyrus Macmillan	Liberal	James Lester Douglas	Liberal
20th	1945–1949	Chester McLure	Progressive Conservative	James Lester Douglas	Liberal
21st	1949–1951	Chester McLure	Progressive Conservative	James Lester Douglas	Liberal
21st	1951–1953	Chester McLure	Progressive Conservative	Angus MacLean	Progressive Conservative
22nd	1953–1957	Neil Matheson	Liberal	Angus MacLean	Progressive Conservative
23rd	1957–1958	Heath MacQuarrie	Progressive Conservative	Angus MacLean	Progressive Conservative
24th	1958–1962	Heath MacQuarrie	Progressive Conservative	Angus MacLean	Progressive Conservative
25th	1962–1963	Heath MacQuarrie	Progressive Conservative	Angus MacLean	Progressive Conservative
26th	1963–1965	Heath MacQuarrie	Progressive Conservative	Angus MacLean	Progressive Conservative
27th	1965–1968	Heath MacQuarrie	Progressive Conservative	Angus MacLean	Progressive Conservative

== Election results ==
1904 Canadian federal election
Party	Candidate	Votes	%	Elected
Conservative	Angus Alexander McLean	4,522	–	X
Conservative	Alexander Martin	4,367	–	X
Liberal	Lemuel Prowse	4,286	–	
Liberal	Alexander B. Warburton	4,094	–	

1908 Canadian federal election
Party	Candidate	Votes	%	Elected
Liberal	Lemuel Prowse	4,290	–	X
Liberal	Alexander B. Warburton	4,196	–	X
Conservative	Angus A. McLean	4,145	–	
Conservative	Alexander Martin	4,113	–	

1911 Canadian federal election
Party	Candidate	Votes	%	Elected
Conservative	Angus Alexander McLean	4,392	–	X
Conservative	Donald Nicholson	4,308	–	X
Liberal	Alexander Bannerman Warburton	4,016	–	
Liberal	Lemuel Ezra Prowse	3,915	–	

1917 Canadian federal election
Party	Candidate	Votes	%	Elected
Government (Unionist)	Donald Nicholson	5,435	–	X
Opposition (Laurier Liberals)	John Ewen Sinclair	5,377	–	X
Government (Unionist)	Alexander Martin	5,374	–	
Opposition (Laurier Liberals)	Alexander Bannerman Warburton	5,276	–	

1921 Canadian federal election
Party	Candidate	Votes	%	Elected
Liberal	John Ewen Sinclair	7,367	–	X
Liberal	Donald Alexander MacKinnon	6,824	–	X
Conservative	John Howard Myers	6,017	–	
Conservative	Donald McKinnon	5,808	–	
Labour	Picton Simons Brown	2,537	–	
Progressive	John Walter Jones	1,883	–	

1925 Canadian federal election
Party	Candidate	Votes	%	Elected
Liberal	Robert Harold Jenkins	8,167	–	X
Conservative	John Albert Messervy	7,432	–	X
Liberal	John Ewen Sinclair	7,400	–	
Unknown	Donald McKinnon	7,392	–	

1926 Canadian federal election
Party	Candidate	Votes	%	Elected
Liberal	Robert Harold Jenkins	9,006	–	X
Liberal	John Ewen Sinclair	8,625	–	X
Conservative	John Albert Messervy	8,124	–	
Conservative	John Howard Myers	8,123	–	

1930 Canadian federal election
Party	Candidate	Votes	%	Elected
Conservative	Chester McLure	9,310	–	X
Conservative	John Howard Myers	9,178	–	X
Liberal	R. Harold Jenkins	8,767	–	
Liberal	Hon. Cyrus MacMillan	8,482	–	

1935 Canadian federal election
Party	Candidate	Votes	%	Elected
Liberal	J. James Larabee	10,326	–	X
Liberal	Peter Sinclair	10,303	–	X
Conservative	Chester McLure	7,767	–	
Conservative	John H. Myers	7,262	–	
Reconstruction	Bernard H. Hughes	1,004	–	
Reconstruction	Earl Ings	836	–	

By-election on 30 December 1935 Larabee resigned and became a Fisheries Protection Service officer for Prince Edward Island, 18 December 1935.
Party	Candidate	Votes
Liberal	Hon. Charles Avery Dunning	acclaimed

1940 Canadian federal election
Party	Candidate	Votes	%	Elected
Liberal	Cyrus MacMillan	10,511	–	X
Liberal	James Lester Douglas	10,411	–	X
National Government	John Orlebar Hyndman	9,206	–	
National Government	Winfield Chester Scott McLure	8,974	–	

1945 Canadian federal election
Party	Candidate	Votes	%	Elected
Liberal	J. Lester Douglas	9,570	–	X
Progressive Conservative	Chester McLure	9,253	–	X
Progressive Conservative	Angus MacLean	9,213	–	
Liberal	Cyrus J. MacMillan	9,125	–	
Co-operative Commonwealth	Leo James Bradley	868	–	
Co-operative Commonwealth	Allan Joseph Callaghan	589	–	

1949 Canadian federal election
Party	Candidate	Votes	%	Elected
Progressive Conservative	Chester McLure	10,657	–	X
Liberal	James Lester Douglas	10,652	–	X
Progressive Conservative	Angus MacLean	10,016	–	
Liberal	Cecil Allan Miller	9,742	–	
Co-operative Commonwealth	Lorne Ellsworth Houston	444	–	

By-election on 25 June 1951 On Mr. Douglas' death, 30 September 1950
Party	Candidate	Votes
Progressive Conservative	Angus MacLean	9,540
Liberal	Cecil Allen Miller	9,087

1953 Canadian federal election
Party	Candidate	Votes	%	Elected
Liberal	Neil Matheson	10,351	–	X
Progressive Conservative	Angus MacLean	10,086	–	X
Liberal	Cecil Allan Miller	9,991	–	
Progressive Conservative	Chester McLure	9,946	–	

1957 Canadian federal election
Party	Candidate	Votes	%	Elected
Progressive Conservative	Angus MacLean	11,597	–	X
Progressive Conservative	Heath MacQuarrie	10,651	–	X
Liberal	Neil Matheson	9,725	–	
Liberal	Cecil A. Miller	9,406	–	
Co-operative Commonwealth	Murdoch Macleod	254	–	

1958 Canadian federal election
Party	Candidate	Votes	%	Elected
Progressive Conservative	Angus MacLean	13,969	–	X
Progressive Conservative	Heath MacQuarrie	13,480	–	X
Liberal	Ernest D. Reid	7,787	–	
Liberal	J.O.C. Campbell	7,540	–	

1962 Canadian federal election
Party	Candidate	Votes	%	Elected
Progressive Conservative	Angus MacLean	12,117	–	X
Progressive Conservative	Heath MacQuarrie	11,590	–	X
Liberal	Ira C. Lewis	9,372	–	
Liberal	Allison M. Gillis	9,356	–	
New Democratic	Leo P. MacIsaac	1,403	–	
New Democratic	Wilfred N. Inman	1,197	–	

1963 Canadian federal election
Party	Candidate	Votes	%	Elected
Progressive Conservative	Angus MacLean	11,666	–	X
Progressive Conservative	Heath MacQuarrie	11,608	–	X
Liberal	Ira Lewis	9,257	–	
Liberal	Allison M. Gillis	9,144	–	
New Democratic	Alexander MacLean	567	–	
New Democratic	Leonard E. Arsenault	264	–	

1965 Canadian federal election
Party	Candidate	Votes	%	Elected
Progressive Conservative	Angus MacLean	12,588	–	X
Progressive Conservative	Heath MacQuarrie	12,305	–	X
Liberal	Mark MacGuigan	9,626	–	
Liberal	B.B. Jones	9,143	–	
New Democratic	Alexander MacLean	670	–	
New Democratic	Douglas MacFarlane	303	–	

== See also ==
- List of Canadian electoral districts
- Historical federal electoral districts of Canada
