= Aquinas Ryan =

Canadian politician and educator

Leader of the New Democratic Party of Prince Edward Island
- In office 1972–1979
- Preceded by: David Hall
- Succeeded by: Doreen Sark (interim)

Personal details
- Born: 1932/1933
- Died: 3 March 2017 (aged 84)
- Party: New Democratic Party
- Spouse: Toddy Rossiter
- Children: Stephen, Andy, Maura, and Maribeth
- Profession: schoolteacher and principal

Aquinas Ryan (1932 or 1933 – 3 March 2017) was a Canadian politician and educator who was leader of the Prince Edward Island New Democratic Party from 1972 to 1979. He ran as the party's candidate in Cardigan in the 1972 federal election, finishing with 14.2 per cent of the vote — which was a historically strong result for the party in the province — and was thus selected as the provincial party's leader later in 1972 following the resignation of David Hall.

Ryan led the party to 5.9 per cent of the popular vote in the 1974 provincial election, the first general election in which it competed with a full slate of candidates, but did not succeed in winning any seats. Ryan won 14.6 per cent of the vote in his own riding. In the 1978 provincial election, the party's popular vote declined to 0.9 per cent provincewide, and the party was able to field just five candidates.

Due to party infighting, he resigned as leader in 1979.

Ryan studied at St. Thomas University in New Brunswick, and taught in Morell, Prince Edward Island, becoming principal of St. Peter's Consolidated School in 1966 and remaining until his 1991 retirement.

Ryan was also involved in the community of St. Peters, helping develop a local park and the annual St. Peters Blueberry Festival.

1972 Canadian federal election: Cardigan
Party	Candidate	Votes	%	±%
Liberal	Daniel J. MacDonald	5,528	44.54	-4.21
Progressive Conservative	Alfred Kenneth Fraser	5,111	41.18	-8.35
New Democratic	Aquinas Ryan	1,771	14.27	+12.51
Total valid votes		12,410	100.00	
