= Douglas Murray (politician) =

Canadian politician

Leader of the New Democratic Party of Prince Edward Island
- In office 1981–1982
- Preceded by: Doreen Sark (interim)
- Succeeded by: David Burke (interim)

Personal details
- Party: New Democratic Party

Douglas Murray was a Canadian politician, who was leader of the Prince Edward Island New Democratic Party from 1981 to 1982. A longtime organizer with the party, he assumed the leadership in 1981; however, within a year he resigned the position due to difficulties in fulfilling the role due to a congenital heart condition.
