= Benjamin Charles Prowse =

Canadian politician

The Hon. Benjamin Charles Prowse

Senator for Charlottetown, Prince Edward Island
- In office 5 May 1911 – 22 February 1930
- Appointed by: Wilfrid Laurier

Personal details
- Born: 10 December 1862 near Charlottetown, Prince Edward Island
- Died: 22 February 1930 (aged 67) Charlottetown, Prince Edward Island
- Party: Liberal
- Spouse(s): 1) Amanda Maud Millner m. 30 June 1886–1928 (her death); 2) Clara Eliza Isabelle MacMillan m. 1929

Benjamin Charles Prowse (10 December 1862 – 22 February 1930) was a Canadian merchant and politician.

He was born near Charlottetown, the son of William Prowse and attended public school there. He worked as a clerk for a dry goods firm there before finding work in his brother Lemuel's clothing store. By 1886, Prowse had become junior partner in his brother's firm. He married Amanda Maud Millner in 1886. Prowse served on the Charlottetown council from 1904 to 1908 and was the 15th mayor from 1908 to 1910. He served in the local militia from 1878 to 1896. He became president of the Prowse Brothers firm in 1925 after his brother's death. Prowse also helped establish Carter and Company Limited and served as its president.

In 1911, he was summoned to the Senate of Canada on the advice of Wilfrid Laurier representing the senatorial division of Charlottetown, Prince Edward Island. A Liberal, he served for almost 19 years until his death in 1930.

In 1929, he married Clara Eliza Isabelle MacMillan; his first wife had died a year earlier. He died at his residence in Charlottetown in 1930 following a "brief illness".
