= Augustine Colin Macdonald =

Canadian politician

The Honourable Augustine Colin Macdonald
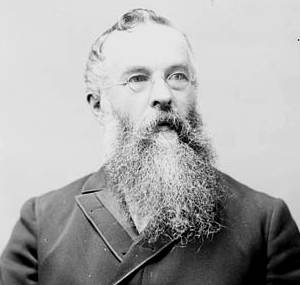
- Augustine C. Macdonald; Source: Library and Archives Canada

10th Lieutenant Governor of Prince Edward Island
- In office June 2, 1915 – July 16, 1919
- Monarch: George V
- Governors General: The Duke of Connaught and Strathearn; The Duke of Devonshire
- Premier: John Alexander Mathieson; Aubin E. Arsenault
- Preceded by: Benjamin Rogers
- Succeeded by: Murdock MacKinnon

Member of the General Assembly of Prince Edward Island for 3rd Kings
- In office April 19, 1870 – April 24, 1873
- Preceded by: None
- Succeeded by: Lemuel Owen

Member of the Canadian Parliament for King's County
- In office September 29, 1873 – January 22, 1874 Serving with Daniel Davies,
- Succeeded by: Peter Adolphus McIntyre
- In office September 17, 1878 – June 20, 1882 Serving with Ephraim Bell Muttart
- Preceded by: Peter Adolphus McIntyre
- Succeeded by: James Edwin Robertson
- In office April 26, 1883 – February 22, 1887 Serving with Peter Adolphus McIntyre
- Preceded by: James Edwin Robertson
- Succeeded by: James Edwin Robertson; Peter Adolphus McIntyre
- In office March 5, 1891 – June 23, 1896 Serving with John McLean (Canadian politician)
- Preceded by: James Edwin Robertson; Peter Adolphus McIntyre
- Succeeded by: The electoral district was abolished in 1892.

Member of the Canadian Parliament for King's
- In office June 23, 1896 – November 7, 1900
- Preceded by: The electoral district was created in 1892.
- Succeeded by: James Joseph Hughes

Personal details
- Born: June 30, 1837 Panmure Island, Prince Edward Island Colony
- Died: July 16, 1919 (aged 82) Charlottetown, Prince Edward Island, Dominion of Canada
- Party: Liberal-Conservative
- Spouse: Mary Elizabeth MacDonald (m. 1865)
- Relations: Andrew Archibald (brother); Archibald John (brother); John S. MacDonald (father-in-law)
- Children: M. Josephine, W. Jane, S. Francis, C. Helena, A. Florence, and A. J. Louis
- Education: University of Prince Edward Island
- Occupation: merchant
- Profession: Politician

Augustine Colin Macdonald (June 30, 1837 – July 16, 1919) was a Canadian merchant and political figure. He represented King's County and later King's in the House of Commons of Canada from 1873 to 1874, from 1878 to 1882, from 1883 to 1887 and from 1891 to 1900 as a Liberal-Conservative member. Macdonald served as the tenth Lieutenant Governor of Prince Edward Island from 1915 to 1919.

He was born in Panmure Island, the son of Hugh Macdonald, a Scottish immigrant, and was educated in Georgetown and Charlottetown. Macdonald married Mary Elizabeth, the daughter of John Small MacDonald, in 1865. He served as a captain in the militia. He represented 3rd Kings in the Legislative Assembly of Prince Edward Island from 1870 to 1873. He resigned his seat in 1873 to run for the federal seat. On June 2, 1915, Macdonald was named Lieutenant Governor. He died in office in 1919.

His brother Andrew Archibald served in the Senate of Canada and was also a Lieutenant Governor for the province and his brother Archibald John was a long-time member of the provincial assembly.

== Electoral record ==
By-election on 29 September 1873 As a result of Prince Edward Island joining Confederation 1 July 1873
Party	Candidate	Votes
Conservative	Daniel Davies	acclaimed
Liberal–Conservative	Augustine Colin Macdonald	acclaimed

1874 Canadian federal election: King's County
Party	Candidate	Votes	%	Elected
Conservative	Daniel Davies	1,704	–	X
Liberal	Peter Adolphus McIntyre	1,530	–	X
Liberal–Conservative	Augustine Colin Macdonald	1,496	–	
lop.parl.ca

1878 Canadian federal election: King's County
Party	Candidate	Votes	%	Elected
Liberal–Conservative	Augustine Colin Macdonald	2,264	–	X
Conservative	Ephraim Bell Muttart	2,077	–	X
Liberal	Peter Adolphus McIntyre	1,499	–	
Unknown	Malcolm McFadyen	1,251	–	

1882 Canadian federal election: King's County
Party	Candidate	Votes	%	Elected
Liberal	Peter Adolphus McIntyre	2,124	–	X
Liberal	James Edwin Robertson	2,002	–	X
Liberal–Conservative	Augustine Colin Macdonald	1,941	–	
Conservative	Ephraim Bell Muttart	1,854	–	

By-election on 26 April 1883 Mr. Robertson was declared not duly elected on the grounds that he was a member of the Prince Edward Island Legislative Assembly at the time of the election. The seat was adjudicated to Mr. MacDonald.
Party	Candidate	Votes
Liberal–Conservative	Augustine Colin Macdonald	acclaimed

1887 Canadian federal election: King's County
Party	Candidate	Votes	%	Elected
Liberal	J.E. Robertson	2,434	–	X
Liberal	Peter Adolphus McIntyre	2,431	–	X
Conservative	Augustine Colin Macdonald	2,398	–	
Conservative	Ephraim Bell Muttart	2,355	–	

1891 Canadian federal election: King's County
Party	Candidate	Votes	%	Elected
Conservative	John McLean	2,624	–	X
Conservative	Augustine Colin Macdonald	2,514	–	X
Liberal	Peter Adolphus McIntyre	2,369	–	
Liberal	James Edwin Robertson	2,276	–	
