= Eileen Rossiter =

Canadian politician

The Honourable Eileen Rossiter

Senator for Prince Edward Island
- In office 1986–2004
- Appointed by: Brian Mulroney

Personal details
- Born: July 14, 1929 Souris, Prince Edward Island
- Died: January 20, 2007 (aged 77)
- Party: Progressive Conservative (1986-2004); Conservative (2004)
- Relations: James Joseph Hughes, grandfather
- Committees: Chair, Standing Committee on Fisheries (1991-1996)

Eileen Rossiter, (née Hughes) (July 14, 1929 – January 20, 2007) was a Canadian politician. She was the second Prince Edward Island woman appointed to Senate of Canada (the first was Florence Elsie Inman).

Born in Souris, Prince Edward Island, she was a realtor before being appointed to the Senate in 1986 representing the senatorial division of Prince Edward Island. She sat as a Progressive Conservative and later a Conservative. She retired on her 75th birthday in 2004.

She married Linus J. Rossiter in 1952. They had six children: Philip, Leonard, Kevin, Patricia, Colleen, and Mary.
