= Austin Levi Fraser =

Canadian politician

Austin Levi Fraser (March 17, 1868 – April 22, 1946) was a Canadian lawyer, judge and political figure on Prince Edward Island. He represented 1st Kings in the Legislative Assembly of Prince Edward Island from 1904 to 1908 and King's in the House of Commons of Canada from 1908 to 1911 as a Conservative member.

He was born in Vernon River, Prince Edward Island, the son of Edward F. Fraser and Florence MacIsaac, and was educated at Prince of Wales College and Saint Dunstan's College. He taught school for several years, then studied law in the office of Francis Haszard and was admitted to the bar in 1900. In 1901, he married Maud Adelaide Moar and set up practice in Souris. Fraser resigned his seat in the provincial assembly in 1908 to run for a seat in the House of Commons. He was defeated by James Joseph Hughes when he ran for reelection in 1911. He was then named judge in the court for Kings County. Fraser died in Souris at the age of 78.
