= James Larabee =

Canadian politician (1885–1954)

J. James Larabee

Member of Parliament for Queen's
- In office October 1935 – December 1935
- Preceded by: Chester McLure
- Succeeded by: Charles Avery Dunning

Personal details
- Born: J. James Larabee; 10 April 1885 Eldon, Prince Edward Island, Canada
- Died: 28 November 1954 (aged 69)
- Party: Liberal
- Profession: merchant

J. James Larabee (10 April 1885 – 28 November 1954) was a Liberal party member of the House of Commons of Canada. He was born in Eldon, Prince Edward Island and became a merchant.

He was first elected to Parliament at the Queen's riding in the 1935 general election. On 18 December 1935, slightly more than two months after election, Larabee resigned to become a fisheries protection officer responsible for his province, opening his Parliamentary seat for Charles Avery Dunning, the designated Minister of Finance.
