= James Joseph Hughes =

Canadian politician

The Hon. James Joseph Hughes
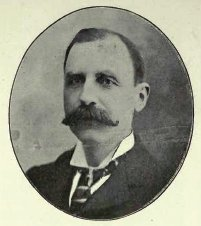

Member of the Canadian Parliament for King's
- In office 1900–1908
- Preceded by: Augustine Colin Macdonald
- Succeeded by: Austin Levi Fraser
- In office 1911–1917
- Preceded by: Austin Levi Fraser
- Succeeded by: James McIsaac
- In office 1921–1925
- Preceded by: James McIsaac
- Succeeded by: John A. Macdonald

Senator for King's, Prince Edward Island
- In office 1925–1941
- Appointed by: William Lyon Mackenzie King

Personal details
- Born: August 15, 1856 St. Mary's Road, Prince Edward Island
- Died: March 5, 1941 (aged 84)
- Party: Liberal
- Relations: Eileen Rossiter, granddaughter; Ellen Webber, granddaughter; William Hughes (son)

James Joseph Hughes (August 15, 1856 – March 5, 1941) was a Canadian politician.

Born in St. Mary's Road, Prince Edward Island, Hughes was the son of Irish parents. He was educated at the Log School House in St. Mary's Road and was a graduate of St. Dunstan's College in Charlottetown.

A merchant, he was first elected to the House of Commons of Canada for the electoral district of King's in the general elections of 1900. A Liberal, he was re-elected in 1904 but was defeated in 1908. He was elected again in 1911 and was defeated in 1917. He was elected again in 1921. In 1925, he was summoned the Senate of Canada representing the senatorial division of King's, Prince Edward Island on the advice of Prime Minister Mackenzie King. He served until his death in 1941.

His son, William Hughes was a cabinet minister on PEI. His granddaughter, Eileen Rossiter, was also a senator, and another granddaughter Ellen Webber was a controller and alderman in Ottawa.
