= David Hall (Canadian politician) =

Canadian politician

Leader of the New Democratic Party of Prince Edward Island
- In office 1972–1972
- Succeeded by: Aquinas Ryan

Personal details
- Born: c. 1939
- Party: New Democratic Party

David Hall (born c. 1939) was a Canadian politician who was the first leader of the Prince Edward Island New Democratic Party in 1972. He previously ran as the party's candidate in Hillsborough in the 1968 federal election.

Under Hall's leadership, the party contested three provincial by-elections in 1972 — its first attempt at running for provincial seats since the Co-operative Commonwealth Federation last competed in 1951 — and received 5.2 per cent of the total vote. Soon afterward, however, Hall moved out of the province and resigned the leadership. He was succeeded as leader by Aquinas Ryan.

== Electoral record ==
1968 Canadian federal election: Hillsborough
Party	Candidate	Votes	%	±%
Progressive Conservative	Heath MacQuarrie	8,328	54.99	
Liberal	Jack McAndrew	6,447	41.05	
New Democratic	David Hall	930	5.92	
