= James McIsaac =

Canadian politician

James McIsaac (1854 – April 2, 1927) was a journalist and political figure in Prince Edward Island, Canada. He represented King's in the House of Commons of Canada from 1917 to 1921 as a supporter of Sir Robert Borden's Union government.

He was born in St Peters Bay, Prince Edward Island, the son of Donald McIsaac and Jane McEachern, and was educated at Saint Dunstan's College and the Université Laval. McIsaac was a journalist in Charlottetown. He was president of the Herald Publishing Company. He ran unsuccessfully in 2nd Kings for a seat in the provincial assembly in 1904 and 1908. McIsaac was defeated when he ran for reelection to the House of Commons in 1921. He died in Ottawa at the age of 73.
