= Heath MacQuarrie =

Canadian politician

The Honourable Heath Macquarrie

Senator for Hillsborough, Prince Edward Island
- In office 3 October 1979 – 18 September 1994
- Appointed by: Joe Clark

Member of Parliament for Hillsborough
- In office 25 June 1968 – 21 May 1979
- Preceded by: Riding created
- Succeeded by: Thomas McMillan

Member of Parliament for Queen's
- In office 10 June 1957 – 24 June 1968
- Preceded by: Neil Matheson
- Succeeded by: Riding abolished

Personal details
- Born: 18 September 1919 Victoria, Prince Edward Island, Canada
- Died: 2 January 2002 (aged 82)
- Party: Progressive Conservative
- Spouse: Jean Isabel Stewart (m. 1949)
- Children: 3
- Profession: Professor; Radio-Commentator; Political Scientist; Author; Teacher

Heath Nelson Macquarrie (18 September 1919 – 2 January 2002) was a Canadian politician, teacher, scholar, and writer. Macquarrie described himself as a Red Tory, using the term in the title of his autobiography Red Tory Blues.

During the October Crisis of 1970, he agonized over the implementation of the War Measures Act, and was prepared to vote against it, but relented for the sake of keeping the Tory caucus united behind Robert Stanfield. Writing in retrospect, Macquarrie described his vote in favour of the Act as "fundamentally wrong".

He was first elected to the House of Commons of Canada as a Progressive Conservative candidate in the 1957 federal election that brought John Diefenbaker to power. He served as a member of parliament for twenty-two consecutive years, until he was appointed to the Senate of Canada in 1979 on the advice of Joe Clark. He sat in the upper house for a further fifteen years, retiring at the mandatory age of 75 in 1994.

He was publicly loyal to Clark's successor, Brian Mulroney, but privately disagreed with the government on several occasions, once saying during a caucus meeting, "You know, a lot of people think I have a prominent nose because of my enjoyment of a certain beverage. Well, that's all nonsense. I got it that way by having to hold it so often while voting for some of Mulroney's bills."

Macquarrie remained active following his retirement from the Senate in 1994, by contributing a column to the Hill Times and to newspapers in his home province of Prince Edward Island.

Macquarrie was educated at Prince of Wales College, the University of Manitoba, the University of New Brunswick and McGill University. He studied for his doctorate at McGill, choosing for his thesis topic Robert Borden. He lectured at Brandon University and at Mount Allison University, in economics, political science and international relations.

He edited and wrote the introduction to the published edition of Sir Robert Borden's diaries. An admirer of the World War I-era prime minister, Macquarrie considered Borden to be the architect of Canadian independence.

== Bibliography ==
- The Conservative Party (1965)
- Robert Laird Borden: His Memoirs (1969, 2 vols.) (ed.)
- Canada and the Third World (1976)
- Canada and the Palestinians, 1947–1982 (1982), ISBN 0-88628-014-1
- Red Tory Blues: A Political Memoir (1992), ISBN 0-8020-5958-9

== Archives ==
There is a Heath Nelson Macquarrie fonds at Library and Archives Canada.

== Electoral record ==
1974 Canadian federal election: Hillsborough
Party	Candidate	Votes	%	±%
Progressive Conservative	Heath MacQuarrie	9,917	50.36	
Liberal	George Chandler	8,577	43.56	
New Democratic	Preston MacLeod	1,197	6.08	
lop.parl.ca

1972 Canadian federal election: Hillsborough
Party	Candidate	Votes	%	±%
Progressive Conservative	Heath MacQuarrie	10,605	55.13	
Liberal	Ian Glass	7,168	37.26	
New Democratic	Etsel Ross	1,464	7.61	
Source: lop.parl.ca

1968 Canadian federal election: Hillsborough
Party	Candidate	Votes	%	±%
Progressive Conservative	Heath MacQuarrie	8,328	54.99	
Liberal	Jack McAndrew	6,447	41.05	
New Democratic	David Hall	930	5.92	
