= John Howard Myers =

Canadian politician

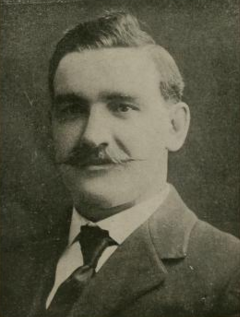
John Howard Myers

John Howard Myers (September 23, 1880 – October 12, 1956) was a farmer and political figure on Prince Edward Island. He represented 1st Queens from 1912 to 1915 and 4th Prince from 1923 to 1926 in the Legislative Assembly of Prince Edward Island and Queen's in the House of Commons of Canada as a Conservative member.

He was born in Hampton, Prince Edward Island, the son of Abraham Myers and Annie McNeill, and was educated at Prince of Wales College. In 1905, Myers married Adelaide Dixon. He served in the province's Executive Council as Minister of Agriculture and Provincial Secretary from 1923 to 1926. Myers ran unsuccessfully for a seat in the House of Commons in 1921 and 1926. He was defeated when he ran for reelection to the House of Commons in 1935. Myers died on his son's farm in Hampton at the age of 76 while helping with the potato harvest.

His son Frank served in the Prince Edward Island assembly.
