= King's (Prince Edward Island electoral district) =

Former federal electoral district in Prince Edward Island, Canada

Prince Edward Island electoral district

Defunct federal electoral district
- Legislature: House of Commons
- District created: 1892
- District abolished: 1966
- First contested: 1896
- Last contested: 1965

King's was a federal electoral district in Prince Edward Island, Canada, that was represented in the House of Commons of Canada from 1896 to 1968.

== History ==
This riding was created from King's County riding. It was abolished in 1966 when it was merged into Cardigan riding. It initially consisted of the town of Georgetown and other parts of the County of King's.

In 1903, it was redefined to consist of the whole of the County of King's.

== Members of Parliament ==
Parliament	Years	Member	Party
King's
8th	1896–1900	Augustine Colin Macdonald	Conservative
9th	1900–1904	James Joseph Hughes	Liberal
10th	1904–1908	James Joseph Hughes	Liberal
11th	1908–1911	Austin Levi Fraser	Conservative
12th	1911–1917	James Joseph Hughes	Liberal
13th	1917–1921	James McIsaac	Government (Unionist)
14th	1921–1925	James Joseph Hughes	Liberal
15th	1925–1926	John Alexander Macdonald	Conservative
16th	1926–1930	John Alexander Macdonald	Conservative
17th	1930–1935	John Alexander Macdonald	Conservative
18th	1935–1940	Thomas Vincent Grant	Liberal
19th	1940–1945	Thomas Vincent Grant	Liberal
20th	1945–1949	Thomas Vincent Grant	Liberal
21st	1949–1953	Thomas Joseph Kickham	Liberal
22nd	1953–1957	Thomas Joseph Kickham	Liberal
23rd	1957–1958	John Augustine Macdonald	Progressive Conservative
24th	1958–1961	John Augustine Macdonald	Progressive Conservative
24th	1961–1962	Margaret Mary Macdonald	Progressive Conservative
25th	1962–1963	Margaret Mary Macdonald	Progressive Conservative
26th	1963–1965	John Mullally	Liberal
27th	1965–1968	Melvin McQuaid	Progressive Conservative

== Election results ==
1896 Canadian federal election
Party	Candidate	Votes
Conservative	Augustine Colin Macdonald	1,939
Liberal	P.A. Mcintyre	1,924

1900 Canadian federal election
Party	Candidate	Votes
Liberal	James Joseph Hughes	2,210
Conservative	Augustine Colin Macdonald	1,970

1904 Canadian federal election
Party	Candidate	Votes
Liberal	James Joseph Hughes	2,653
Conservative	John Mclean	2,596

1908 Canadian federal election
Party	Candidate	Votes
Conservative	Austin Levi Fraser	2,672
Liberal	James Joseph Hughes	2,490

1911 Canadian federal election
Party	Candidate	Votes
Liberal	James Joseph Hughes	2,538
Conservative	Austin Levi Fraser	2,524

1917 Canadian federal election
Party	Candidate	Votes
Government (Unionist)	James Mcisaac	2,889
Opposition (Laurier Liberals)	James Joseph Hughes	2,837

1921 Canadian federal election
Party	Candidate	Votes
Liberal	James Joseph Hughes	3,829
Conservative	James Mcisaac	3,008
Progressive	Daniel J. Mullin	1,877

1925 Canadian federal election
Party	Candidate	Votes
Conservative	John A. Macdonald	3,758
Liberal	James J. Johnston	3,422

1926 Canadian federal election
Party	Candidate	Votes
Conservative	John Alexander Macdonald	4,329
Liberal	James J. Johnston	4,229

1930 Canadian federal election
Party	Candidate	Votes
Conservative	John Alexander Macdonald	4,719
Liberal	Thomas V. Grant	4,391

1935 Canadian federal election
Party	Candidate	Votes
Liberal	Thomas Vincent Grant	5,895
Conservative	Augustine Adolphus Macdonald	3,510
Reconstruction	George A. Leslie	249

1940 Canadian federal election
Party	Candidate	Votes
Liberal	Thomas Vincent Grant	4,997
National Government	Augustine Adolphus Mcdonald	4,081

1945 Canadian federal election
Party	Candidate	Votes
Liberal	Thomas Vincent Grant	4,655
Progressive Conservative	Hugh Francis Macphee	4,282
Co-operative Commonwealth	Mercier Joseph Mullin	317

1949 Canadian federal election
Party	Candidate	Votes
Liberal	Thomas Joseph Kickham	5,079
Progressive Conservative	John Augustine Macdonald	4,482

1953 Canadian federal election
Party	Candidate	Votes
Liberal	Thomas Joseph Kickham	4,750
Progressive Conservative	John Augustine Macdonald	4,373

1957 Canadian federal election
Party	Candidate	Votes
Progressive Conservative	John Augustine Macdonald	4,598
Liberal	Thomas Joseph Kickham	4,146
Co-operative Commonwealth	Alexander Maclean	87

1958 Canadian federal election
Party	Candidate	Votes
Progressive Conservative	John Augustine Macdonald	5,018
Liberal	Thomas Joseph Kickham	3,884

By-election on 29 May 1961 Macdonald's death, 4 January 1961
Party	Candidate	Votes
Progressive Conservative	Margaret Mary Macdonald	4,472
Liberal	T.J. Kickham	4,309

1962 Canadian federal election
Party	Candidate	Votes
Progressive Conservative	Margaret Mary Macdonald	4,548
Liberal	Thomas J. Kickham	4,383
New Democratic	Tommy Joseph Dunphy	467

1963 Canadian federal election
Party	Candidate	Votes
Liberal	John Mullally	4,705
Progressive Conservative	Margaret Mary Macdonald	4,304
New Democratic	Brendon Dunphy	62

1965 Canadian federal election
Party	Candidate	Votes
Progressive Conservative	Melvin McQuaid	4,591
Liberal	John Mullally	4,451
New Democratic	Tobias Wilfred Mullin	106

== See also ==
- List of Canadian electoral districts
- Historical federal electoral districts of Canada
