= John Mullally =

Canadian politician (1930–2021)

John Cooney Mullally

Member of Parliament for King's
- In office April 1963 – September 1965

Personal details
- Born: 28 November 1930 Souris, Prince Edward Island
- Died: 7 February 2021 (aged 90) Halifax, Nova Scotia
- Party: Liberal
- Profession: Teacher

John Cooney Mullally (28 November 1930 – 7 February 2021) was a Liberal party member of the House of Commons of Canada. He was a teacher by profession.

He was first elected at the King's riding in the 1963 general election. After serving only one term in office, the 26th Canadian Parliament, Mullally was defeated at King's riding in the 1965 election by Melvin McQuaid of the Progressive Conservative party.

Mullally faced McQuaid again in the 1968 federal election, that time at Cardigan because of riding boundary changes in the late 1960s. Mullally once again lost to McQuaid. Mullally died on 7 February 2021 at the age of 90.
