= Cyrus Macmillan =

Canadian politician

The Honourable Cyrus Macmillan PC

Member of the Canadian Parliament for Queen's
- In office 1940–1945

Personal details
- Born: September 12, 1878 Wood Islands, Prince Edward Island
- Died: June 29, 1953 (aged 74)
- Party: Liberal
- Spouse: Margaret Brower
- Cabinet: Minister of Fisheries (1930)
- Committees: Chair, Special Committee on Pension Act and War Veterans' Allowance Act (1940–1942); Chair, Special Committee on Land Settlement of Veterans of the Present War (1940–1942); Chair, Special Committee on Honours and Decorations (1940–1942); Chair, Special Committee on Social Security (1942–1943)
- Portfolio: Parliamentary Assistant to the Minister of National Defence for Air (1943–1946)

Cyrus Macmillan, PC (September 12, 1878 – June 29, 1953) was a Canadian academic, writer and politician.

Born in Wood Islands, Prince Edward Island, he received a Bachelor of Arts degree in 1900 from McGill University. He was appointed to the faculty of Prince of Wales College in Charlottetown (1901–1907). He received a Master of Arts (1905) and Ph.D. (1909) from Harvard University and started as a contract lecturer at McGill. He joined the faculty full time in 1911. During World War I, he took a leave from McGill and served with both the 6th and the 7th Canadian Siege Battery, 1916–1919. After the war, he resumed his faculty position at the rank of Associate Professor and in 1923 was appointed Chair of the English department. From 1940 to 1947, he was the Dean of the Faculty of Arts and Science, retiring in the latter year.

His entry to politics was through appointments to the federal Royal Commission on Maritime Claims (1926) and Atlantic Fisheries (1928). He chaired the Royal Commission on Education for Prince Edward Island in 1929. In June 1930, he was appointed Minister of Fisheries in the cabinet of Liberal Prime Minister Mackenzie King. He was defeated in July's 1930 federal election in the Prince Edward Island riding of Queen's. In 1940, he was elected to the House of Commons of Canada in the riding of Queen's. He was defeated in 1945. From 1943 to 1946, he was the Parliamentary Assistant to the Minister of National Defence for Air and served on or chaired numerous government committees.

A staunch member of the Presbyterian Church of Canada, he played an important role in its continuation after many adherents joined the United Church of Canada. Just prior to church union to form the United Church of Canada, he served as the sole lay delegate to the Church of Scotland assembly in Edinburgh, in May 1925, where he successfully argued with his cousin the Rev. Dr. Daniel Fraser, for the continued recognition of the Presbyterian Church in Canada.

He is the author of McGill and Its Story, 1821-1921 (1921), Canadian Wonder Tales (1918) and Canadian Fairy Tales (1922).

== Harvard University Ph.D. ==
MacMillan's doctoral thesis was supervised by Professor George Lyman Kittredge (1860–1941) of the English Department at Harvard University, and titled The Folk Songs of Canada. It was completed in 1909, comprising four volumes in English and in French and more than a thousand pages of text, both in type and, in the case of many of the song lyrics, handwritten. It was the first doctoral thesis approved at Harvard that was not confined to purely American literature. Kittredge was primarily a Shakespearean scholar, known for his Complete Works of Shakespeare (1936) but also recognized for his work in folk songs and myths of New England. It was during this time that MacMillan developed a lifelong love of classical literature and folklore.

== McGill University career ==
In addition to playing a major role as a professor of English in establishing McGill's theatre program, he served as Dean of Arts and Science from 1940 to 1947, and he published books on Canadian mythology. His McGill and its Story, 1821-1921 (Toronto, 1921), the university's first monographic history, was superseded only in the 1980s with the publication of Stanley Frost's McGill University: for the Advancement of Learning (Montreal, 1980, 1984) 2 vol.

== Military career ==
World War I interrupted the careers of many young men. MacMillan left academia in April 1916 and served with an artillery battery mounted by students and faculty from McGill University and partner colleges in Montreal and Halifax, undergoing his basic training as well as officer's training. He was posted to England in September 1916 for artillery training. Captain MacMillan fought at Vimy Ridge and Hill 70—two of the most famous battles fought on French soil. He served in Canadian Siege Batteries No. 6 and 7, rising to the rank of Major.

== Family life ==
His family background is Scottish. Both his maternal and paternal great-grandparents emigrated from Scotland to Prince Edward Island in 1803 and 1806 respectively. His letters home to his wife, Margaret Eaton Brower (they had been married in Montreal in August 1916, just a month before he left for his overseas posting), and family offer a sanitized but beautifully written account of his war experiences. Just prior to entering the theatre of war in France, MacMillan and Brower, herself a graduate of McGill University, made a brilliant marriage. They shared a love of literature, drama, and the theatre, as well as faith and politics. They had no children.

== Political career ==
His participation in Canadian public life was notable. During the 1920s he was appointed to Royal Commissions for Maritime Claims, Atlantic Fisheries, and Prince Edward Island Education. In 1930, he served briefly as the first Federal Minister of Fisheries, before being defeated in a general election. Between 1940 and 1945, while serving as a Dean at McGill, he was also a Member of Parliament for Queens County, P.E.I., serving from 1942 to 1945 as Parliamentary Assistant to the Minister of Defence for Air.

== Writings ==
He is the author of several books:

- Canadian Wonder Tales (1918)
- McGill and Its Story, 1821-1921 (1921)
- Canadian Fairy Tales (1922)
- Folk Songs of Canada (1909, doctoral thesis at McGill)
- Glooscap's Country and other Indian Tales (1955, published posthumously)
