= John Albert Messervy =

Canadian politician

John Albert Messervy (October 20, 1861 – June 2, 1928) was an industrialist and political figure on Prince Edward Island, Canada. He represented Queen's in the House of Commons of Canada from 1925 to 1926 as a Conservative.

He was born in St. George's, Newfoundland and Labrador, the son of Benjamin Thomas Messervy and Martha J.M. Bagg. In 1870, Messervy moved to Prince Edward Island and was educated in Charlottetown. He was a manufacturer in Charlottetown and a director of the Hickey and Nicholson Tobacco Company. In 1898, he married Carrie A. Wade. Messervy was defeated when he ran for reelection to the House of Commons in 1926. He died in Charlottetown at the age of 66.
