= Robert Harold Jenkins =

Canadian politician

Robert Harold Jenkins (June 30, 1873 – November 5, 1939) was a merchant, investment dealer and political figure in Prince Edward Island, Canada. He represented Queen's in the House of Commons of Canada from 1925 to 1930 as a Liberal MP.

He was born at Mount Albion, Prince Edward Island, the son of Robert Jenkins and Jessie Currie. Jenkins graduated from the Commercial College in Charlottetown in 1889. For a time, he was involved in the trade in eggs with the United States and then entered the grocery trade in Charlottetown. In 1897, he married Minnie M. Hooper.

He was the 22nd mayor of Charlottetown from 1923 to 1924. Jenkins was elected to the House of Commons in 1925 and 1926 but was defeated when he ran for reelection in 1930.
