= Thomas Vincent Grant =

Canadian politician (1876–1966)

Thomas Vincent Grant (21 December 1876 – 24 December 1966) was a physician, educator and political figure in Prince Edward Island, Canada. He represented 3rd Kings in the Legislative Assembly of Prince Edward Island from 1927 to 1930 and King's in the House of Commons of Canada from 1935 to 1949 as a Liberal. Grant sat for Montague division in the Senate of Canada from 1949 to 1965.

He was born in Peakes Station, Prince Edward Island, the son of Allan Grant and Mary Fisher, and was educated there and at Prince of Wales College. He taught school for several years and then was hired by the Charlottetown Post Office. In 1902, he married Minnie Donovan. He later worked as an insurance agent, then attended medical college in Boston and practiced medicine in Cardigan, Vernon River and Montague. He was coroner for Kings County from 1920 to 1930. Grant served in the province's Executive Council as a minister without portfolio from 1927 to 1930. He resigned his seat in the provincial assembly in 1930 to run unsuccessfully for a federal seat. Grant died in the Charlottetown Hospital at the age of 90.
