= Thomas Joseph Kickham =

Canadian politician

The Honourable Thomas Joseph Kickham

Senator for Cardigan
- In office July 8, 1966 – December 1, 1974

Member of the Canadian Parliament for King's
- In office June 6, 1949 – June 9, 1957

Personal details
- Born: March 11, 1901 Souris West, Prince Edward Island, Canada
- Died: December 1, 1974 (aged 73) Souris West, Prince Edward Island, Canada
- Party: Liberal

Thomas Joseph Kickham (March 11, 1901 – December 1, 1974) was a farmer, trader and political figure on Prince Edward Island. He represented 1st Kings in the Legislative Assembly of Prince Edward Island from 1943 to 1949 and King's in the House of Commons of Canada from 1949 to 1957 as a Liberal. Kickham sat for Cardigan division in the Senate of Canada from 1966 to 1974.

He was born in Souris West, Prince Edward Island, the son of Richard Kickham and Alice Landrigan, and was educated at Saint Dunstan's College. In 1943, he married Mabel MacDonald. Kickham resigned his seat in the provincial assembly in 1949 to run for a seat in the House of Commons. He ran unsuccessfully for reelection to the House of Commons in 1957, 1958, 1961 and 1962. He also served as a director for the Kings County Hospital. Kickham died in office in Souris West at the age of 73.
