= Angus MacLean =

Canadian politician

The Honourable Angus MacLean PC OC DFC
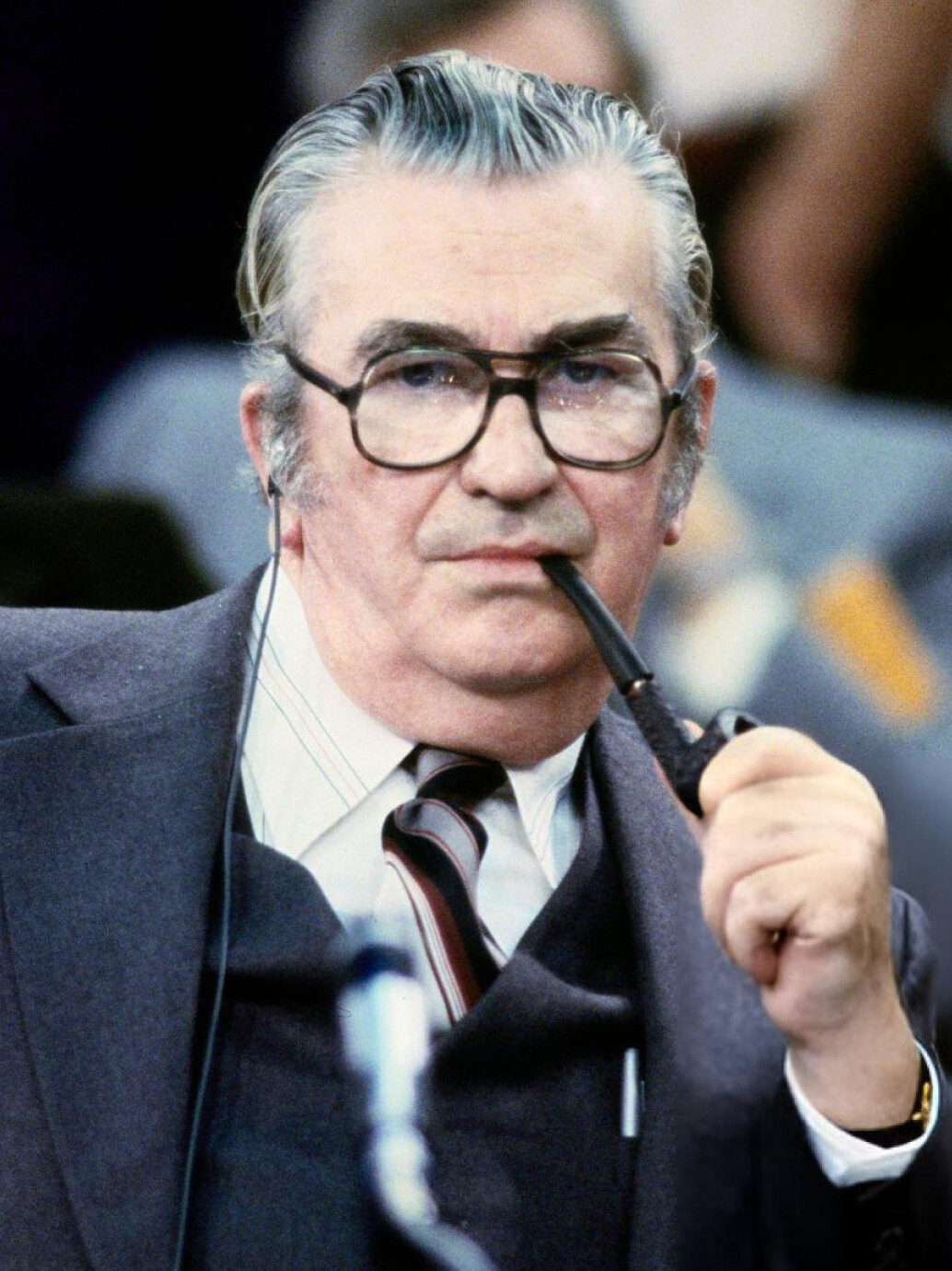
- MacLean, c. 1980

25th Premier of Prince Edward Island
- In office May 3, 1979 – November 17, 1981
- Monarch: Elizabeth II
- Lieutenant Governor: Gordon L. Bennett; Joseph Aubin Doiron
- Preceded by: W. Bennett Campbell
- Succeeded by: James Lee

MLA (Assemblyman) for 4th Queens
- In office November 8, 1976 – September 27, 1982
- Preceded by: Vernon MacIntyre
- Succeeded by: Wilbur MacDonald

Leader of the Progressive Conservative Party of Prince Edward Island
- In office September 25, 1976 – November 7, 1981
- Preceded by: Lloyd MacPhail (interim)
- Succeeded by: James Lee

Member of Parliament for Malpeque
- In office June 25, 1968 – October 20, 1976
- Preceded by: District created
- Succeeded by: Don Wood

Member of Parliament for Queen's
- In office June 25, 1951 – June 25, 1968
- Preceded by: James Lester Douglas
- Succeeded by: District abolished

Personal details
- Born: John Angus MacLean; May 15, 1914 Lewes, Prince Edward Island
- Died: February 15, 2000 (aged 85) Charlottetown, Prince Edward Island
- Party: Progressive Conservative
- Other political affiliations: Progressive Conservative Party of Prince Edward Island
- Spouse: Gwendolyn Esther Burwash (m. 1952)
- Children: 4
- Education: Mount Allison University; University of British Columbia
- Cabinet: Federal: Ministers of Fisheries (1957–1963); Postmaster General (acting) (1962–1963) Provincial: Minister Responsible for Cultural Affairs (1979–1980)

John Angus MacLean PC OC DFC (May 15, 1914 – February 15, 2000) was a politician and farmer in Prince Edward Island, Canada.

He was an alumnus of both Mount Allison University and the University of British Columbia with degrees in science. MacLean left farming to enlist in the Royal Canadian Air Force during World War II, serving from 1939 to 1947 and achieving the rank of Wing Commander.

MacLean's bomber was shot down, and he evaded capture in Nazi-occupied Europe with the help of the Belgian escape-line Comète with Andrée De Jongh.

MacLean returned to Prince Edward Island after the war, and ran for a seat in the House of Commons of Canada as a Progressive Conservative Party of Canada candidate, but was defeated in the 1945 and 1949 federal elections.

He was first elected to Parliament in a 1951 by-election and held his seat continuously until he left federal politics in 1976. MacLean served in the cabinet of Prime Minister John Diefenbaker as Minister of Fisheries from 1957 until the government's defeat in the 1963 election.

In 1976, MacLean was persuaded to leave federal politics and take the leadership of the Progressive Conservative Party of Prince Edward Island which had languished in opposition for a decade. On 8 November 1976, MacLean was elected to the provincial legislature in a by-election. MacLean led the party to victory in 1979, and formed a government that emphasized rural community life, banned new shopping malls and instituted a Royal Commission to examine land use and sprawl. His government cancelled the province's participation in the Point Lepreau Nuclear Generating Station in New Brunswick.

On 17 August 1981, MacLean announced his intention to resign as premier upon electing a new party leader. MacLean retired as premier on 17 November 1981, when James Lee was sworn-in as his successor and did not run in the 1982 provincial election. He returned to the family farm that he redeveloped for low-intensity blueberry farming. A respected steward of the land and of rural communities, MacLean was a committed Presbyterian of Scottish descent. In 1991, he was made an Officer of the Order of Canada.

He died in Charlottetown on February 15, 2000.

== Electoral record ==
1974 Canadian federal election: Malpeque
Party	Candidate	Votes	%	±%
Progressive Conservative	Angus MacLean	5,649	50.61	-2.92
Liberal	John W. MacNaught	4,975	44.57	+2.62
New Democratic	Doreen Sark	537	4.81	+0.29
Total valid votes		11,161	100.00	

1972 Canadian federal election: Malpeque
Party	Candidate	Votes	%	±%
Progressive Conservative	Angus MacLean	5,835	53.53	+3.53
Liberal	Sinclair Cutcliffe	4,573	41.95	−5.97
New Democratic	Maurice J. Darte	493	4.52	+2.43
Total valid votes		10,901	100.00	

1968 Canadian federal election: Malpeque
Party	Candidate	Votes	%
Progressive Conservative	Angus MacLean	5,049	50.00
Liberal	Don Wood	4,839	47.92
New Democratic	Douglas H. MacFarlane	211	2.09
Total valid votes		10,099	100.00
