= Lemuel E. Prowse =

Canadian politician

Lemuel Ezra Prowse (2 February 1858 – 17 December 1925) was a merchant and political figure in Prince Edward Island. He represented 5th Queens in the Legislative Assembly of Prince Edward Island from 1893 to 1900 as a Liberal member and represented Queen's in the House of Commons of Canada from 1908 to 1911 as a Liberal.

He was born in Charlottetown, the son of William Prowse, and educated there. In 1879, he married Frances Stanley. With his brothers, he operated a dry goods store in Charlottetown. Prowse ran unsuccessfully for a federal seat in 1904; he was defeated when he ran for reelection in 1911.

His son Thomas William served in the provincial assembly and became lieutenant-governor for Prince Edward Island. His brother Benjamin Charles served as mayor of Charlottetown and in the Canadian Senate.
