= John Ewen Sinclair =

Canadian politician

The Hon. John Ewen Sinclair

Member of the Canadian Parliament for Queen's
- In office 1917–1925
- In office 1926–1930

Senator for Queen's, Prince Edward Island
- In office 1930–1949
- Appointed by: William Lyon Mackenzie King

Personal details
- Born: 24 December 1879 Summerfield, Prince Edward Island
- Died: 23 December 1949 (aged 69)
- Party: Liberal
- Cabinet: Minister Without Portfolio (1921-1925)

John Ewen Sinclair, PC (24 December 1879 – 23 December 1949) was a Canadian politician.

Born in Summerfield, Prince Edward Island, the son of Peter Sinclair, he was first elected to the House of Commons of Canada in the Prince Edward Island riding of Queen's in 1917 federal election. A Liberal, he was re-elected in 1921. He was defeated in 1925 but was elected again in 1926.

From 1921 to 1925, he was a Minister without Portfolio.

In 1930, he was appointed to the Senate of Canada representing the senatorial division of Queen's, Prince Edward Island. He served until his death in 1949.
