= Outline of Prince Edward Island =

Overview of and topical guide to Prince Edward Island

Location of Prince Edward Island

The following outline is provided as an overview of and topical guide to Prince Edward Island:

Flag of Prince Edward Island

Prince Edward Island – Canadian province consisting of an island of the same name, as well as other islands. It is one of the three Maritime provinces and is the smallest in the nation in land area and in population. According to the 2011 census, the province of Prince Edward Island has 140,204 residents. It is located approximately 200 km north of Halifax, Nova Scotia and 600 km east of Quebec City. It consists of the main island plus 231 minor islands.

== General reference ==
- Pronunciation:
- Common English country name(s): Prince Edward Island
- Official English country name(s): Province of Prince Edward Island
- Nickname(s):
  - "Garden of the Gulf"
  - "Birthplace of Confederation"
- Common endonym(s):
- Official endonym(s):
- Adjectival(s):
- Demonym(s): Prince Edward Islander, Islander (colloquial)

== Geography of Prince Edward Island ==
Geography of Prince Edward Island

- Prince Edward Island is: an island province of Canada
- Population of Prince Edward Island:
- Area of Prince Edward Island:
- Atlas of Prince Edward Island

=== Location ===
- Prince Edward Island is situated within the following regions:
  - Northern Hemisphere, Western Hemisphere
    - Americas
      - North America
        - Northern America
          - Laurentia
            - Canada
              - Eastern Canada
                - Atlantic Canada
                  - The Maritimes
  - Atlantic Ocean
    - Gulf of St. Lawrence
- Time zone(s): Atlantic

=== Environment of Prince Edward Island ===
- List of protected areas of Prince Edward Island
  - List of historic places in Prince Edward Island
  - List of National Historic Sites of Canada in Prince Edward Island

==== Natural geographic features of Prince Edward Island ====
- Islands of Prince Edward Island
- Rivers of Prince Edward Island
- World Heritage Sites in Prince Edward Island

=== Islands of Prince Edward Island ===
- List of islands of Prince Edward Island

==== Administrative divisions of Prince Edward Island ====
- Counties of Prince Edward Island
  - Parishes in Prince Edward Island

===== Counties of Prince Edward Island =====
Counties of Prince Edward Island

- Kings County, Prince Edward Island
  - Shiretown: Georgetown
- Prince County, Prince Edward Island
  - Shiretown: Summerside
- Queens County, Prince Edward Island
  - Shiretown: Charlottetown

===== Parishes of Prince Edward Island, by county =====
- Prince County
  - North Parish
  - Egmont Parish
  - Halifax Parish
  - Richmond Parish
  - St. David's Parish
- Queens County
  - Grenville Parish
  - Hillsboro Parish
  - Charlotte Parish
  - Bedford Parish
  - St. John's Parish
- Kings County
  - St. Mary's Parish
  - St. Patrick's Parish
  - East Parish
  - St. George's Parish
  - St. Andrew's Parish

===== Municipalities of Prince Edward Island =====
- Capital of Prince Edward Island: Capital of Prince Edward Island
- List of population centres in Prince Edward Island
- Cities of Prince Edward Island
- List of townships in Prince Edward Island

=== Demography of Prince Edward Island ===
Demographics of Prince Edward Island

- List of population centres in Prince Edward Island

== Government and politics of Prince Edward Island ==
Politics of Prince Edward Island

- Form of government: Constitutional monarchy
- Capital of Prince Edward Island: Charlottetown
- Elections in Prince Edward Island
  - Elections Prince Edward Island
  - Canadian federal election results in Prince Edward Island
  - Prince Edward Island general elections
    - 1873 - 1876 - 1879 - 1882 - 1886 - 1890 - 1893 - 1897 - 1900 - 1904 - 1908 - 1912 - 1915 - 1919 - 1923 - 1927 - 1931 - 1935 - 1939 - 1943 - 1947 - 1951 - 1955 - 1959 - 1962 - 1966 - 1970 - 1974 - 1978 - 1979 - 1982 - 1986 - 1989 - 1993 - 1996 - 2000 - 2003 - 2007- 2011 - 2015
- First Nations in Prince Edward Island – First Nations are the various Aboriginal peoples in Canada who are neither Inuit nor Métis.
  - Indian Association of Prince Edward Island – province-wide First Nations rights organization.
- Political parties in Prince Edward Island
- Taxation in Prince Edward Island

=== Federal representation ===
- Senators

=== Provincial government of Prince Edward Island ===
==== Executive branch ====
- Head of state: King in Right of Prince Edward Island, King of Canada, King Charles III
  - Head of state's representative (Viceroy): Lieutenant Governor of Prince Edward Island
    - List of lieutenant governors of Prince Edward Island
    - Head of government: Premier of Prince Edward Island
      - List of premiers of Prince Edward Island
      - Deputy Premier of Prince Edward Island
      - Cabinet: Executive Council of Prince Edward Island
        - Head of council: Lieutenant Governor in Council, as representative of the King in Right of Prince Edward Island
- Order of precedence in Prince Edward Island
- Prince Edward Island ministries

==== Legislative branch ====
- Parliament of Prince Edward Island, which has 2 components:
  - King-in-Parliament (King of Canada), represented in his absence by the Lieutenant-Governor of Prince Edward Island
    - List of lieutenant governors of Prince Edward Island
  - Legislative Assembly of Prince Edward Island
    - Speaker of the Legislative Assembly of Prince Edward Island
    - List of Prince Edward Island General Assemblies
    - Leader of the Opposition (Prince Edward Island)
- Federal representation
  - List of Prince Edward Island senators

==== Judicial branch ====
- Supreme Court of Prince Edward Island
  - Court of Appeal of Prince Edward Island
    - Court of King's Bench of Prince Edward Island (Superior court)
      - Provincial Court of Prince Edward Island
        - County Court of Prince Edward Island

=== Foreign relations of Prince Edward Island ===
Foreign relations of Prince Edward Island

- Diplomatic missions in Prince Edward Island
- Diplomatic missions of Prince Edward Island

=== Law and order in Prince Edward Island ===
- Same-sex marriage in Prince Edward Island

== History of Prince Edward Island ==
History of Prince Edward Island

== Culture of Prince Edward Island ==
Culture of Prince Edward Island

- Architecture in Prince Edward Island
  - List of lighthouses in Prince Edward Island
- Museums in Prince Edward Island
- Order of Prince Edward Island
- Scouting and Guiding in Prince Edward Island
- Symbols of Prince Edward Island
  - Coat of arms of Prince Edward Island
  - Flag of Prince Edward Island
- World Heritage Sites in Prince Edward Island

=== Art in Prince Edward Island ===
- Prince Edward Island Council of the Arts
- Music of Prince Edward Island
  - Prince Edward Island Music Awards

=== Sports in Prince Edward Island ===
- List of curling clubs in Prince Edward Island
- Hockey in Prince Edward Island
  - List of ice hockey teams in Prince Edward Island
  - Prince Edward Island Junior C Hockey League
- Prince Edward Island Rugby Union
- Prince Edward Island Scotties Tournament of Hearts

== Economy of Prince Edward Island ==
Economy of Prince Edward Island

- Communications in Prince Edward Island
  - List of radio stations in Prince Edward Island
  - List of television stations in Prince Edward Island
  - Postage stamps and postal history of Prince Edward Island
- Energy in Prince Edward Island
  - List of electrical generating stations in Prince Edward Island
  - Petroleum pricing in Prince Edward Island
- Health in Prince Edward Island
  - Prince Edward Island Hospital
- Transport in Prince Edward Island
  - Airports in Prince Edward Island
  - Roads in Prince Edward Island
    - List of Prince Edward Island provincial highways
  - Vehicle registration plates of Prince Edward Island

== Education in Prince Edward Island ==
- English Language School Board (Prince Edward Island)
- List of school districts in Prince Edward Island
- Higher education in Prince Edward Island
  - University of Prince Edward Island

== See also ==
- Outline of geography
  - Outline of North America
    - Outline of Canada
      - Outline of Alberta
      - Outline of British Columbia
      - Outline of Manitoba
      - Outline of Nova Scotia
      - Outline of Ontario
      - Outline of Quebec
      - Outline of Saskatchewan
