= Politics of Prince Edward Island =

Canadian provincial government

- Coat of arms of Prince Edward Island
- Polity type: Province within a federal parliamentary constitutional monarchy
- Constitution: Constitution of Canada

Legislative branch
- Name: General Assembly: Legislative Assembly
- Type: Unicameral
- Meeting place: Province House, Charlottetown
- Presiding officer: Speaker of the Legislative Assembly

Executive branch
- Head of state
- Currently: King Charles III represented by Wassim Salamoun, Lieutenant Governor
- Head of government
- Currently: Premier; Bloyce Thompson
- Appointer: Lieutenant Governor
- Cabinet
- Name: Executive Council
- Leader: Premier (as President of the Executive Council)
- Appointer: Lieutenant Governor
- Headquarters: Charlottetown

Judicial branch
- Court of Appeal
- Chief judge: David H. Jenkins
- Seat: Charlottetown

The politics of Prince Edward Island are centred on a provincial government resembling that of the other Canadian provinces. The capital of the province of Prince Edward Island is Charlottetown, where the lieutenant governor and the premier reside, and where the provincial legislature and cabinet are located.

== Legislature ==
Prince Edward Island's government is based on the Westminster model, with a unicameral legislature – the General Assembly – consisting of the Lieutenant Governor and the Legislative Assembly with 27 members of the Legislative Assembly (MLAs), elected from 27 roughly equal electoral districts using plurality voting (first-past-the-post voting). The legislature may sit for a maximum of five years, as is customary in the Westminster system, and may be dissolved at any time by the lieutenant-governor, normally on the advice of the premier. By custom, the provincial Cabinet (which currently has ten members) is drawn exclusively from the Legislative Assembly, and must secure the support of a majority of the Assembly's members.

== Political history ==
Prince Edward Island is a Canadian province consisting of an island of the same name. The island is part of Mi'kma'ki, the lands of the Mi'kmaq people. Explored by Europeans in the 16th century, the French claimed all of the lands of the Maritimes in 1604 and French colonists arrived in 1720. By conquest, the British claimed all of the lands including Prince Edward Island in 1763. It became the British colony of St. John Island in 1769 and joined Canada on July 1, 1873.

=== Electoral history ===
==== The two-seat district era (1873–1996) ====
During this period, all of PEI's MLAs were elected in two-seat districts using first-past-the-post voting. In the early elections, different voters voted to fill the two separate seats, but in the later years, the exact same voters could vote to fill each of the two seats.

Election date		Win.	Total seats	Conservative/Progressive Conservative (Note: Includes results for Progressive Conservatives from 1942 onwards.)		Liberal		NDP (Note: Includes results for the Co-operative Commonwealth Federation from 1943 to 1951.)		Green		Other		
Election date		Win.	Total seats	Seats	Vote (%)	Seats	Vote (%)	Seats	Vote (%)	Seats	Vote (%)	Seats	Vote (%)	Seat-winning party
1873	April 1, 1873	CON	30	15	(Note: Vote share not known for the elections in the 19th century.)	10						5		Non-partisan
1876	August 10, 1876	CON	30	15		7						8		Non-partisan
1879	April 2, 1879	CON	30	24		6								
1882	May 8, 1882	CON	30	21		9								
1886	June 30, 1886	CON	30	18		12								
1890	January 30, 1890	CON	30	15 (Note: Tie between Conservatives and Liberals, resulting in the incumbent Conservatives remaining in power until losing a motion of confidence in 1891 after a series of by-election losses and the Liberals taking power for the remainder of the term.)		15								
1893	December 13, 1893	LIB	30	7		23								
1897	July 28, 1897	LIB	30	11		19								
1900	December 12, 1900	LIB	30	9	46.5	21	53.5							
1904	December 7, 1904	LIB	30	8	45.9	22	54.1							
1908	November 18, 1908	LIB	30	13	48.4	17	51.6							
1912	January 3, 1912	CON	30	28	60.3	2	39.7							
1915	September 16, 1915	CON	30	17	50.1	13	49.9							
1919	July 24, 1919	LIB	30	6	46.1	24	53.9							
1923	July 26, 1923	CON	30	25	51.5	5	43.8						4.7 (Note: Includes 3.4% for the Progressive Party / United Farmers.)	
1927	June 25, 1927	LIB	30	6	46.9	24	53.1							
1931	August 6, 1931	CON	30	18	51.7	12	48.3							
1935	July 23, 1935	LIB	30	–	42.0	30	58.0							
1939	May 18, 1939	LIB	30	4	47.0	26	53.0							
1943	September 15, 1943	LIB	30	10	46.1	20	51.3		2.1				0.5	
1947	December 11, 1947	LIB	30	6	45.8	24	49.8		4.3				0.1	
1951	April 26, 1951	LIB	30	6	46.7	24	51.6		1.7					
1955	May 25, 1955	LIB	30	3	45.0	27	55.0							
1959	September 1, 1959	PC	30	22	50.9	8	49.1							
1962	December 10, 1962	PC	30	19	50.6	11	49.4							
1966	May 30, 1966	LIB	32	15	49.5	17	50.5							
1970	May 11, 1970	LIB	32	5	41.7	27	58.3							
1974	April 29, 1974	LIB	32	6	40.2	26	53.9		5.9					
1978	April 24, 1978	LIB	32	15	48.2	17	50.7		1.1					
1979	April 23, 1979	PC	32	21	53.2	11	45.3		1.3				0.2	
1982	September 27, 1982	PC	32	21	53.6	11	45.7		0.7					
1986	April 21, 1986	LIB	32	11	45.6	21	50.4		4.0					
1989	May 29, 1989	LIB	32	2	35.8	30	60.7		3.5					
1993	March 29, 1993	LIB	32	1	39.5	31	55.1		5.4					

==== The Post-Two party era (1996–present) ====
Elections to the Legislative Assembly of Prince Edward Island (1996–2023) - seats won by party
Government	PC			Liberal			PC	
Party	1996	2000	2003	2007	2011	2015	2019	2023
Progressive Conservative	18	26	23	4	5	8	13 (Note: Extended election for vacant seat held July 15, 2019 due to the death of original Green Party candidate before the election on April 23, 2019.)	22
Liberal	8	1	4	23	22	18	6	3
Green						1	8	2
New Democratic	1							
Total	27	27	27	27	27	27	27	27

== Political parties ==
Prince Edward Island used to have the purest two-party system of any level of government in Canada until both 1996 and 2015 elections. Since joining the Canadian Confederation in 1873, the province has been governed at intervals by the Liberal Party of Prince Edward Island and the Progressive Conservative Party of Prince Edward Island (which has gone by other names in the past). Third Party candidates have been elected 12 times during that time.

In the Prince Edward Island 1996 election, Herb Dickieson of the Island New Democrats was the elected member for West Point-Bloomfield. He served from 1996 to 2000.

The next third party candidate to earn a seat in the provincial legislature was in the 2015 election when Peter Bevan-Baker, leader of the Green Party of Prince Edward Island, was elected in the riding of Kellys Cross-Cumberland. In a 2017 by-election PEI Green Party member Hannah Bell was elected from Charlottetown-Parkdale, marking the first time in Prince Edward Island's politics that two third-party candidates had held seats in the legislature.

In the 2019 election, the Green Party elected eight and became the new official opposition party, while the Liberals became the new third party. Thus PEI's two-party system finally ended to become a semi-two-party system.

In the 2023 election, the Liberals regained official opposition status.

Political parties are registered in the province, under Section 24 of the Election Act.

=== The Progressive Conservative Party ===
The Progressive Conservative Party of Prince Edward Island, founded in 1873, was a fully incorporated wing of the Progressive Conservative Party of Canada (and its antecedents) until the federal party was disbanded in 2003. It is not formally a part of the new Conservative Party of Canada, but the two organizations share members, and most senior provincial officials have openly stated support for the federal party. It has governed frequently, most recently from 1996 to 2007. The party is strongly of the Red Tory political tradition. In October 2011, "The Progressive Conservatives boosted their seat count from two to five," out of 27. Due to a floor crossing on October 3, 2013, followed the next day by an expulsion of an MLA, the seat total fell to three. The party won 8 seats in the 2015 election to expand its seats as the official opposition. The party won 12 seats in the 2019 election, to become the first minority government since 1893. It increased its seat count to 13 in an extension election in July 2019, then won a by-election in November 2020, to up their number to 14 seats, thus becoming a majority government. The party won an increased majority of 22 seats, in the 2023 election.

=== Green Party ===
The Green Party of Prince Edward Island was founded in 2005, and ran in the 2007 election for the first time. The party received a larger proportion of the total vote than the NDP during the 2007 provincial election.

In July 2012, the Green Party of PEI leader and co-founder Sharon Labchuk resigned. Darcie Lanthier served as interim leader until November 2012. At the Leadership Convention in Charlottetown, 3 November 2012, the Green Party of Prince Edward Island elected Peter Bevan-Baker as leader. Bevan-Baker was elected to the Legislature in 2015, winning the party's first seat since the party was founded. He was joined in the Legislature by Hannah Bell in a 2017 by–election. In the 2019 election, they surpassed the Liberal Party by both seat size and popular vote to become the province's Official Opposition party, as they gained six more seats from the Liberal Party. The Greens were reduced to two seats in the 2023 election, losing their status as official opposition to the Liberals.

=== The Liberal Party ===
The Liberal Party of Prince Edward Island, founded in 1873, is a fully incorporated wing of the Liberal Party of Canada. It has governed frequently, including several notable stretches from 1891 to 1911 and 1935 to 1959. It most recently held government from 2007 to 2019. In October 2011, the Liberal Party lost two seats, but retained 22 out of 27 seats in the Legislature. The seat total was 23 from October 3, 2013, following a floor crossing, until February 23, 2015, due to three MLA resignations, thus reducing to 20. The party dropped to 18 seats in the 2015 election. Then in 2017 due to a resignation (and loss in subsequent by-election), followed by a floor crossing in 2018, the party dropped to 16 seats. The party suffered further losses in the 2019 election due to gains by the Green Party and Progressive Conservatives, reducing the Liberals to 6 seats. This resulted in the Liberals becoming the province's third party for the first time in their history. The party was further reduced to 5 seats in September 2020, with the resignation of an MLA and subsequent loss of the resultant by-election in November 2020. The Liberals regained their status as the official opposition, winning three seats to the Greens two in the 2023 election.

=== The New Democratic Party ===
The New Democratic Party of Prince Edward Island, founded in 1962, are a fully incorporated wing of the New Democratic Party of Canada. While nominally included as one of the Island's major political parties, it has elected only one member in its history, usually performing poorly in general elections and finishing behind the other parties. The party's candidates often finish last out of party-affiliated candidates in each riding, though in 2000 Herb Dickieson, the sitting MLA, finished second, and in 1947, a Co-operative Commonwealth Federation (precursor to the NDP) candidate finished second in a riding with a Conservative candidate who had been thrown out of the party. The New Democrats are currently unrepresented in the legislature. Michelle Neill was elected party leader on April 23, 2022, succeeding Joe Byrne who had resigned on September 1, 2020. The New Democrats failed to win any seats in 2023.

=== The Island Party ===
The Island Party of Prince Edward Island formed after the 2007 election. The party officially registered on March 5, 2010, and fielded 11 candidates in the 2011 election under leader Billy Cann. The party was deregistered when it failed to nominate the required 10 candidates for the 2015 election and did not file an information return.

The party re-registered on September 9, 2022. Party president Paul Smitz cited Liberal and PC governments' failure to rescind the controversial Municipal Government Act as a significant reason for the party re-forming. University of Prince Edward Island political science professor Don Desserud described the party's platform as "right-leaning" with "some progressive social policy," and compared the party to the United Farmers movement. Members of the party participated in the 2022 Freedom Convoy protests against COVID-19 public health mandates. The party nominated 11 candidates for the 2023 election under leader Ahava Kálnássy de Kálnás, electing none and receiving around 1% of the popular vote.

== Political culture ==
PEI has been called the closest thing to a direct democracy in Canada. Because of its small population (135,851 residents, as of the 2006 Canadian census) and sizable legislature, each MLA represents, at most, approximately 5,000 people. Ridings, especially urban ones, tend to be quite small. The result of this is that almost everyone knows their MLA personally, or through a friend or colleague. Provincial elections on PEI make next to no use of television and radio advertising, and are instead fought house-to-house, since tiny districts make it realistically possible to visit almost every constituent while campaigning.

Voter turnout on Prince Edward Island is the highest for any jurisdiction in North America above the municipal level. For example, the 2003 election occurred on the day after Hurricane Juan struck, knocking out power to much of the Island and felling trees, but turnout was higher than 80%. Turnout for federal elections tends to be somewhat lower than turnout for provincial elections. Because of the small districts, even a handful of votes can swing a district. In 2003, three MLAs were elected with victory margins of less than 100 votes, and only two with margins of more than 1000 votes.

Patronage is a strong element of traditional Island politics, and has been a widely accepted practice for generations. Recent political discrimination rulings based on the Charter of Rights and Freedoms have put this longstanding tradition into question, however.

In 2010, some PEI politicians expressed concerns that eliminating the "long form" census would form a less detailed picture of PEI, and thus hurt the island's population by way of reduced Confederation programs. Politicians expressing worry about these developments included MP Shawn Murphy (Liberal-Charlottetown) and PEI Finance Minister Wes Sheridan (also a Liberal).

== Issues ==
Because of the highly centrist trend that characterizes both major parties, elections are rarely fought on wildly contrasting platforms, and instead on a collection of local issues. Recently, a prominent issue has been the continued operation of the Island's five rural hospitals, which is increasingly questioned by the growing urban population.

Prince Edward Island is dependent on federal equalization payments for much of its budget. The economy is heavily based on agriculture, the fishery, tourism, and bioscience, with no natural resources or heavy industry (although light manufacturing of avionics parts is growing in importance). The provincial government often has a budgetary deficit, given the lack of local revenues and dependency on federal funds. The continued maintenance of traditional industries is often debated, as well as the need to diversify the province's economy.

== Overview of federal politics ==
Under the Canadian Constitution, Prince Edward Island is entitled to four seats in the Senate of Canada, and a corresponding minimum of four seats in the House of Commons of Canada. This results in PEI being considerably overrepresented in the current House, as six of Canada's ten provinces are to varying degrees.

As of April 2019, PEI is regarded as a stronghold for the Liberal Party of Canada, having been represented exclusively by Liberal Members of Parliament from 1988 until 2008. In 2006, it was one of only two provinces (the other being Alberta) to give more than 50 percent of its votes to a single party. Much of this can be attributed to the total collapse and eventual demise of the Progressive Conservative Party of Canada, which had previously been the stronger of PEI's two competing political parties for much of the 20th century. The Reform Party/Canadian Alliance rejected Red Toryism, and the Conservative Party of Canada has yet to be accepted as a legitimate heir to the old Progressive Conservatives. The federal New Democratic Party has never attracted much support on PEI, although it is more successful than its provincial counterpart. In 2008, Gail Shea became the first conservative MP from PEI since 1988.

In the most recent federal election of 2019, however, the Greens have seen a rise in support, as their Official Opposition status on the provincial level has benefitted it on the federal stage. However, all 4 seats remain in Liberal hands.

== See also ==
- Lieutenant-Governor of Prince Edward Island
- Premier of Prince Edward Island (list)
- Legislative Assembly of Prince Edward Island
- List of Prince Edward Island general elections (post-Confederation)
- Political parties of Prince Edward Island
- Government of Prince Edward Island
- Executive Council of Prince Edward Island
- Council of the Federation
- Politics of Canada
- Political culture of Canada

== Other sources ==
- Francis William Pius Bolger, Prince Edward Island and Confederation: 1863-1873, CCHA, Report, 28 (1961), 25–30.
