= List of post-confederation Prince Edward Island general elections =

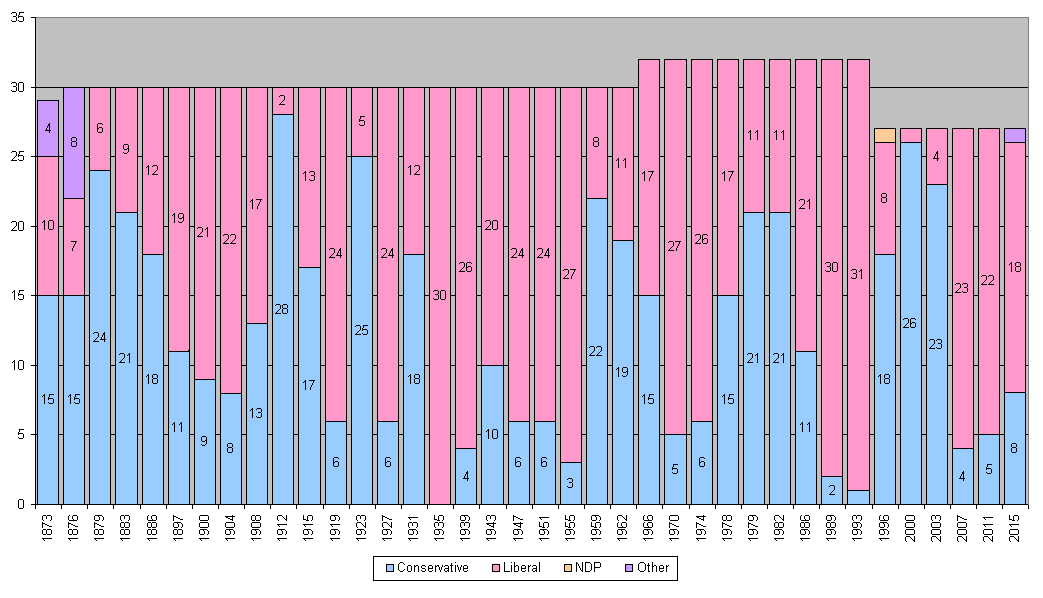
Number of seats won by major parties at each election (except 2019 and 2023 general elections): Conservative/PC; Liberal; NDP; Non-partisan

General elections to the Canadian province of Prince Edward Island's unicameral legislative body, the Prince Edward Island House of Assembly. Prince Edward Island became part of the Canadian Confederation in 1873. Prior to that, Prince Edward Island was a British colony; the House of Assembly dates to 1769.

The number of seats has varied over time, from a high of thirty-two between the 1960s and 1990s, to the current low of twenty-seven.

Prince Edward Island was effectively a two-party system - the Liberal party (red) and Conservative/Progressive Conservative party (blue) until the 2019 election. After the first two elections (when not all MLAs declared a party allegiance), until 2015, only one MLA had been elected who has not been a member of these two parties. The Green Party won their first seat in 2015, their second in a 2017 byelection, and won a total of 8 seats in 2019, to form the first Green Official Opposition.

The Liberal party was elected to majority of seats in eighteen of the twenty-nine PEI general elections that occurred in the 20th century.

Prior to 1996, PEI used 16 dual-member districts; the 32 members have sat together since the 1893 abolition of the Legislative Council as a separate body. The boundaries for these districts were drawn in 1893; a single change was made in 1966 (when the riding of Charlottetown, also known as 5th Queens, was split into two parts). In 1996, a court determined that the number of electors varied too much between districts, and was therefore unconstitutional. This resulted in a redistricting in which a system of single-member districts was created.

== Summary ==
The table below shows the total number of seats won by the major political parties at each election (if greater than zero). It also shows the percentage of the vote obtained by the major political parties at each election, if greater than 0.1%. The winning party's totals are shown in bold. To date, no party has formed a government that did not have the largest share of the vote. Full details on any election are linked via the year of the election at the start of the row.

Election date		Win.	Total seats	PC^{[A]}		Liberal		NDP^{[B]}		Green		Other		
Election date		Win.	Total seats	Seats	Vote (%)	Seats	Vote (%)	Seats	Vote (%)	Seats	Vote (%)	Seats	Vote (%)	Seat-winning party
1873	April 1, 1873	CON	30	**15**	^{[C]}	10	^{[C]}					5		Non-partisan
1876	August 10, 1876	CON	30	**15**	^{[C]}	7	^{[C]}					8		Non-partisan
1879	April 2, 1879	CON	30	**24**	^{[C]}	6	^{[C]}							
1882	May 8, 1882	CON	30	**21**	^{[C]}	9	^{[C]}							
1886	June 30, 1886	CON	30	**18**	^{[C]}	12	^{[C]}							
1890	January 30, 1890	CON	30	15^{[D]}	^{[C]}	15^{[D]}	^{[C]}							
1893	December 13, 1893	LIB	30	7	^{[C]}	**23**	^{[C]}							
1897	July 28, 1897	LIB	30	11	^{[C]}	**19**	^{[C]}							
1900	December 12, 1900	LIB	30	9	46.5	**21**	**53.5**							
1904	December 7, 1904	LIB	30	8	45.9	**22**	**54.1**							
1908	November 18, 1908	LIB	30	13	48.4	**17**	**51.6**							
1912	January 3, 1912	CON	30	**28**	**60.3**	2	39.7							
1915	September 16, 1915	CON	30	**17**	**50.1**	13	49.9							
1919	July 24, 1919	LIB	30	6	46.1	**24**	**53.9**							
1923	July 26, 1923	CON	30	**25**	**51.5**	5	43.8						4.7^{[E]}	
1927	June 25, 1927	LIB	30	6	46.9	**24**	**53.1**							
1931	August 6, 1931	CON	30	**18**	**51.7**	12	48.3							
1935	July 23, 1935	LIB	30	–	42.0	**30**	**58.0**							
1939	May 18, 1939	LIB	30	4	47.0	**26**	**53.0**							
1943	September 15, 1943	LIB	30	10	46.1	**20**	**51.3**		2.1				0.5	
1947	December 11, 1947	LIB	30	6	45.8	**24**	**49.8**		4.3				0.1	
1951	April 26, 1951	LIB	30	6	46.7	**24**	**51.6**		1.7					
1955	May 25, 1955	LIB	30	3	45.0	**27**	**55.0**							
1959	September 1, 1959	PC	30	**22**	**50.9**	8	49.1							
1962	December 10, 1962	PC	30	**19**	**50.6**	11	49.4							
1966	May 30, 1966	LIB	32	15	49.5	**17**	**50.5**							
1970	May 11, 1970	LIB	32	5	41.7	**27**	**58.3**							
1974	April 29, 1974	LIB	32	6	40.2	**26**	**53.9**		5.9					
1978	April 24, 1978	LIB	32	15	48.2	**17**	**50.7**		1.1					
1979	April 23, 1979	PC	32	**21**	**53.2**	11	45.3		1.3				0.2	
1982	September 27, 1982	PC	32	**21**	**53.6**	11	45.7		0.7					
1986	April 21, 1986	LIB	32	11	45.6	**21**	**50.4**		4.0					
1989	May 29, 1989	LIB	32	2	35.8	**30**	**60.7**		3.5					
1993	March 29, 1993	LIB	32	1	39.5	**31**	**55.1**		5.4					
1996	November 18, 1996	PC	27	**18**	**47.4**	8	44.8	1	7.8					
2000	April 17, 2000	PC	27	**26**	**57.9**	1	33.7		8.4					
2003	September 29, 2003	PC	27	**23**	**54.0**	4	42.9		3.1					
2007	May 28, 2007	LIB	27	4	41.4	**23**	**52.9**		2.0		3.0		0.7	
2011	October 3, 2011	LIB	27	5	40.2	**22**	**51.4**		3.2		4.4		0.9	
2015	May 4, 2015	LIB	27	8	37.4	**18**	**40.8**		11.0	1	10.8			
2019	April 23, 2019	PC	27	**12**	**36.5**	6	29.5		2.9	8	30.6			
2023	April 3, 2023	PC	27	**22**	**55.92**	3	17.21		4.49	2	21.57			

=== Notes ===
^{A} Includes results for Progressive Conservatives from 1942 onwards.
^{B} Includes results for the Co-operative Commonwealth Federation from 1943 to 1951.
^{C} Vote share not known for the elections in the 19th century.
^{D} Tie between Conservatives and Liberals, resulting in the incumbent Conservatives remaining in power until losing a motion of confidence in 1891 after a series of by-election losses and the Liberals taking power for the remainder of the term.
^{E} Includes 3.4% for the Progressive Party / United Farmers.

== Historical voter turnouts ==
Year	Turnout (%)
1966	85.65
1970	87.32
1974	82.10
1978	86.30
1979	83.80
1982	78.20
1986	87.60
1989	80.80
1993	80.70
1996	85.48
2000	84.86
2003	83.27
2007	83.84
2011	76.53
2015	82.1
2019	76.28
2023	68.50

== Bibliography ==
- "Historical Election Dates". Elections PEI. Archived from the original on 2012-02-05. (Number of MLAs per party for all elections)
- "Chief Electoral Officer Reports". Elections PEI. (Full results back to 1966)
- "Provincial General Election Results 1962" (PDF). Elections PEI. 2001-05-29.
- "Provincial General Election Results 1959" (PDF). Elections PEI. 2001-05-29.
- "Provincial General Election Results 1955" (PDF). Elections PEI. 2001-05-29.
- "Provincial General Election Results 1951" (PDF). Elections PEI. 2001-05-29.
- "Provincial General Election Results 1947" (PDF). Elections PEI. 2001-05-29.
- "Provincial General Election Results 1943" (PDF). Elections PEI. 2001-05-29.
- "Provincial General Election Results 1939" (PDF). Elections PEI. 2001-05-29.
- "Provincial General Election Results 1935" (PDF). Elections PEI. 2001-05-29.
- "Provincial General Election Results 1931" (PDF). Elections PEI. 2001-05-29.
- "Provincial General Election Results 1927" (PDF). Elections PEI. 2001-05-29.
- "Provincial General Election Results 1923" (PDF). Elections PEI. 2001-05-29.
- "Provincial General Election Results 1919" (PDF). Elections PEI. 2001-05-29.
- "Provincial General Election Results 1915" (PDF). Elections PEI. 2001-05-29.
- "Provincial General Election Results 1912" (PDF). Elections PEI. 2001-05-29.
- "Provincial General Election Results 1908" (PDF). Elections PEI. 2001-05-29.
- "Provincial General Election Results 1904" (PDF). Elections PEI. 2001-05-29.
- "Provincial General Election Results 1900" (PDF). Elections PEI. 2001-05-29.
- "P.E.I. voter turnout lowest in decades". CBC.ca. 2011-10-04.

== See also ==
- Timeline of Canadian elections
- List of political parties in Prince Edward Island
