= 1931 in Canada =

- Decades: 1910s; 1920s; 1930s; 1940s; 1950s
- See also: History of Canada; Timeline of Canadian history; List of years in Canada

Events from the year 1931 in Canada.

== Incumbents ==
=== Crown ===
- Monarch – George V

=== Federal government ===
- Governor General – Freeman Freeman-Thomas, 1st Marquess of Willingdon (until April 4) then Vere Ponsonby, 9th Earl of Bessborough
- Prime Minister – Richard Bedford Bennett
- Chief Justice – Francis Alexander Anglin (Ontario)
- Parliament – 17th

=== Provincial governments ===
==== Lieutenant governors ====
- Lieutenant Governor of Alberta – William Egbert (until May 5) then William Legh Walsh
- Lieutenant Governor of British Columbia – Robert Randolph Bruce (until July 18) then John William Fordham Johnson
- Lieutenant Governor of Manitoba – James Duncan McGregor
- Lieutenant Governor of New Brunswick – Hugh Havelock McLean
- Lieutenant Governor of Nova Scotia – Frank Stanfield (until September 25) then Walter Harold Covert (from October 5)
- Lieutenant Governor of Ontario – William Donald Ross (until October 25) then William Mulock
- Lieutenant Governor of Prince Edward Island – Charles Dalton
- Lieutenant Governor of Quebec – Henry George Carroll
- Lieutenant Governor of Saskatchewan – Henry William Newlands (until March 31) then Hugh Edwin Munroe

==== Premiers ====
- Premier of Alberta – John Edward Brownlee
- Premier of British Columbia – Simon Fraser Tolmie
- Premier of Manitoba – John Bracken
- Premier of New Brunswick – John Baxter (until May 19) then Charles Dow Richards
- Premier of Nova Scotia – Gordon Sidney Harrington
- Premier of Ontario – George Stewart Henry
- Premier of Prince Edward Island – Walter Lea (until August 29) then James D. Stewart
- Premier of Quebec – Louis-Alexandre Taschereau
- Premier of Saskatchewan – James Thomas Milton Anderson

=== Territorial governments ===
==== Commissioners ====
- Gold Commissioner of Yukon – George Ian MacLean
- Commissioner of Northwest Territories – William Wallace Cory (until March 31) then Hugh Rowatt

== Events ==
- May 19 – Charles Richards becomes premier of New Brunswick, replacing John Baxter
- August 29 – James D. Stewart becomes premier of Prince Edward Island for the second time, replacing Walter Lea
- November 12 – Maple Leaf Gardens opens in Toronto
- September 29 – Striking coal miners clash with the Royal Canadian Mounted Police in the Estevan riot.
- December 11 – the Statute of Westminster goes into effect: Canada is granted full legislative independence in national and international affairs, with the Crown represented by the Governor General.
- The Beauharnois Scandal breaks out

== Sport ==
- March 27 - The Manitoba Junior Hockey League's Elmwood Millionaires win their only Memorial Cup by defeating Ottawa City Junior Hockey League's Ottawa Primroses 2 games to 1. The deciding Game 3 was played at Ottawa Auditorium
- April 14 - The Montreal Canadiens win their fourth Stanley Cup by defeating the Chicago Black Hawks 3 game to 2. The deciding game was played at the Montreal Forum
- November 12 - Maple Leaf Gardens opens
- December 5 - The Montreal AAA Winged Wheelers win their first and only Grey Cup by defeating the Regina Roughriders 22 to 0 in the 19th Grey Cup played Percival Molson Memorial Stadium in Montreal

== Births ==
=== January to March ===
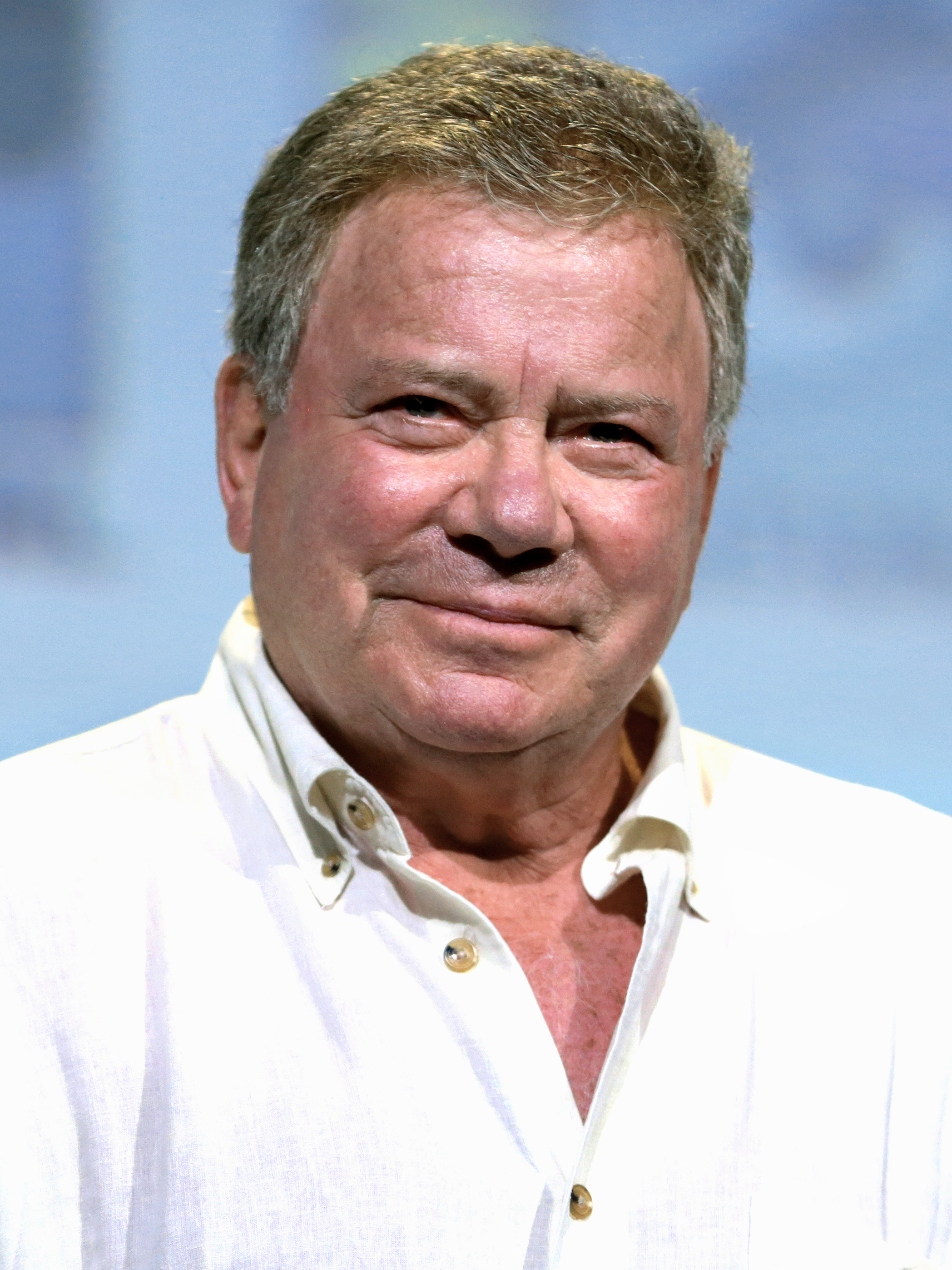
William Shatner

- January 5 - Percy Schmeiser, businessman, farmer, and politician (d. 2020)
- January 6 - Dickie Moore, ice hockey player, businessman and philanthropist (d. 2015)
- January 7 - Elizabeth Kishkon, politician (d. 2018)
- January 19 - Robert MacNeil, Canadian-American journalist (d. 2024)
- January 27 - Mordecai Richler, author, screenwriter and essayist (d. 2001)
- January 30 - John Crosbie, politician and Minister (d. 2020)
- February 16 - Bernie Geoffrion, ice hockey player (d. 2006)
- February 17 - Mark MacGuigan, academic and politician (d. 1998)
- February 26 - C. William Doody, politician and Senator (d. 2005)
- March 10 - Georges Dor, author, composer, playwright, singer, poet, translator and theatrical producer and director (d. 2001)
- March 12 - Danny Lewicki, Canadian professional ice hockey player (d. 2018)
- March 16 - Patricia Rideout-Rosenberg, contralto and music educator (d. 2006)
- March 20 - Hubert Desbiens, politician (d. 2009).
- March 22 - William Shatner, actor and novelist
- March 22 - Monte Kwinter, politician
- March 25 - Jack Chambers, artist and filmmaker (d. 1978)
- March 28 - Jane Rule, novelist and non-fiction writer (d. 2007)
- March 30 - Gérard Bruchési, politician

=== April to June ===
- April 2 - Howard Engel, writer and television producer (d. 2019)
- April 9 - Richard Hatfield, politician and 26th Premier of New Brunswick (d. 1991)
- April 13 - Cliff Lumsdon, world champion marathon swimmer (d. 1991)
- April 15 - Helen Maksagak, politician, first woman and first Inuk Northwest Territories Commissioner (d. 2009)
- April 19 - Walter Stewart, writer, editor and journalism educator (d. 2004)
- April 22 - John Buchanan, lawyer, politician and 27th Premier of Nova Scotia
- April 29 - Chris Pearson, 1st Premier of the Yukon (d. 2014)
- May 18 - Clément Vincent, politician (d. 2018)
- May 21 - Jeannine Pelland, former President of the Order of nurses of Quebec
- May 22 - Arthé Guimond, Roman Catholic prelate, Archbishop of Grouard-McLennan (2000–2006) (d. 2013).
- May 24 - Bruce Owen, politician and lawyer (d. 2022)
- May 25 - Herb Gray, politician, Canada's first Jewish federal cabinet minister
- June 23 - Charles Keith Taylor, politician
- June 25 - Stan Dromisky, politician
- June 27 - Charles Bronfman, businessman and philanthropist
- June 30 - Joyce Wieland, experimental filmmaker and mixed media artist (d. 1998)

=== July to September ===
- July 2 - Robert Ito, actor
- July 5 - Peter Silverman, broadcast journalist (d. 2021)
- July 6 - Jean Campeau, Quebec businessman and politician
- July 7 - Charles Alexander Best, politician (d. 1978)
- July 10 - Alice Munro, short-story writer (d. 2024)
- July 15 - Jacques-Yvan Morin, politician (d. 2023)
- July 19 - Allan Slaight, rock and roll radio pioneer, media mogul, and philanthropist (d. 2021)
- July 20 - Gilles Morin, politician
- August 18 - Bramwell Tillsley, General of The Salvation Army
- August 29 - Lise Payette, politician, feminist, writer and columnist
- August 30 - Frank Zakem, politician and businessman (d. 2013)
- August 31 - Jean Béliveau, ice hockey player
- September 23 - Gerald Merrithew, politician (d. 2004)

=== October to December ===
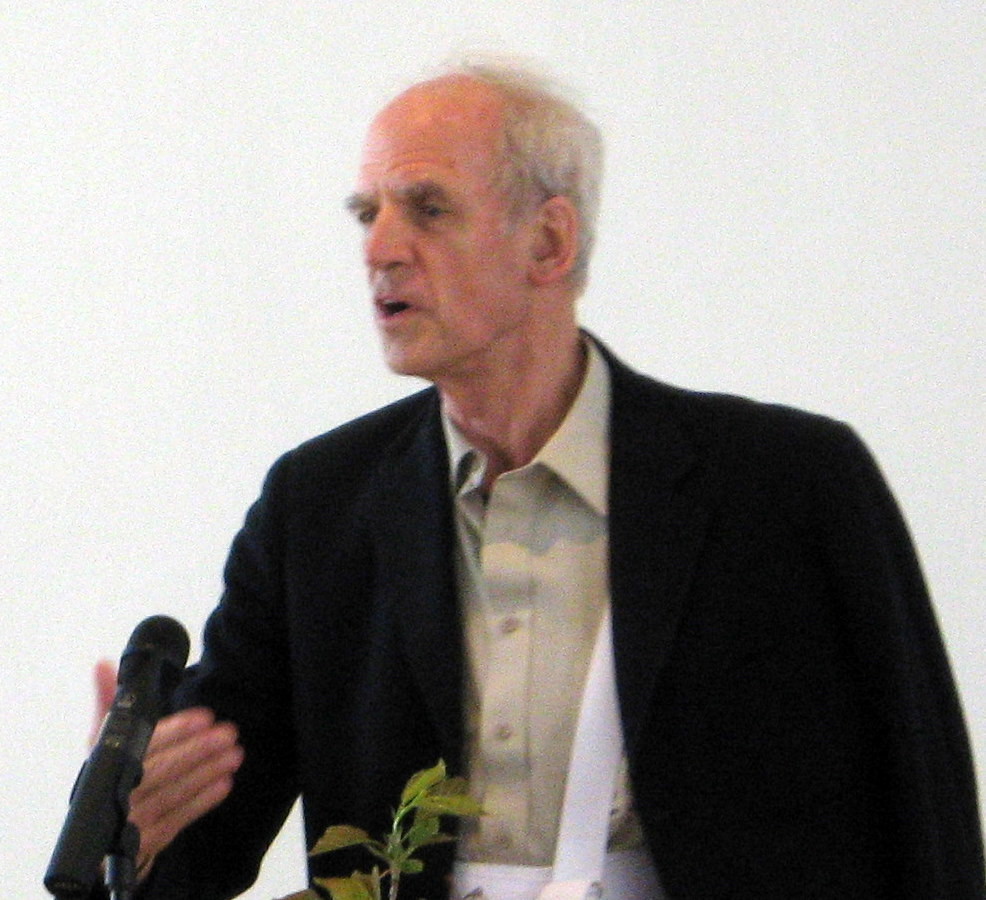
Charles Taylor

- October 4 - Werner Israel, physicist (d. 2022)
- October 8 - Isadore Sharp, businessman
- November 5 - Charles Taylor, philosopher
- November 8 – Morley Safer, journalist (60 Minutes) (d. 2016)
- November 13 - Andrée Lachapelle, actress (d. 2019)
- November 28 - George Ramsay Cook, historian (d. 2016)
- November 30 - Harry Enns, politician
- December 4 - Alex Delvecchio, ice hockey player (d. 2025)
- December 10 - Jack Riddell, politician (d. 2024)
- December 15 - John Allen Fraser, politician, Speaker of the House of Commons (d. 2024)

=== Full date unknown ===
- Gaelyne Gabora, soprano and music teacher (d. 2001)

== Deaths ==
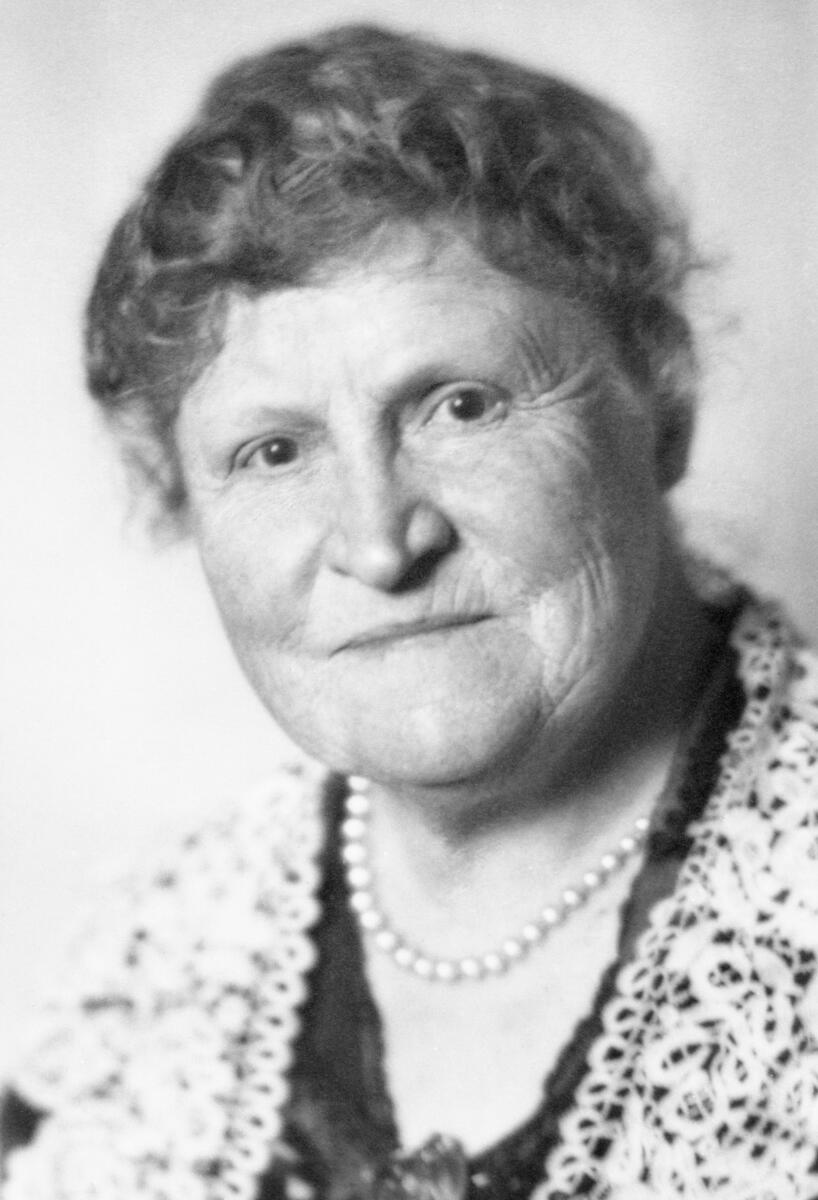
Henrietta Edwards

- July 10 - Louise McKinney, first woman sworn into the Legislative Assembly of Alberta and first woman elected to a legislature in Canada and in the British Empire (b. 1868)
- July 28 - Charles Doherty, politician and jurist (b. 1855)
- November 10 - Henrietta Edwards, women's rights activist and reformer (b. 1849)
- December 30 - George Eulas Foster, politician and academic (b. 1847)

=== Full date unknown ===
- Fred Dixon, politician (b. 1881)

== See also ==
- List of Canadian films
