= 1927 Prince Edward Island general election =

Canadian provincial election

← 1923	June 25, 1927	1931 →

All 30 seats in the Legislative Assembly of Prince Edward Island 16 seats needed for a majority
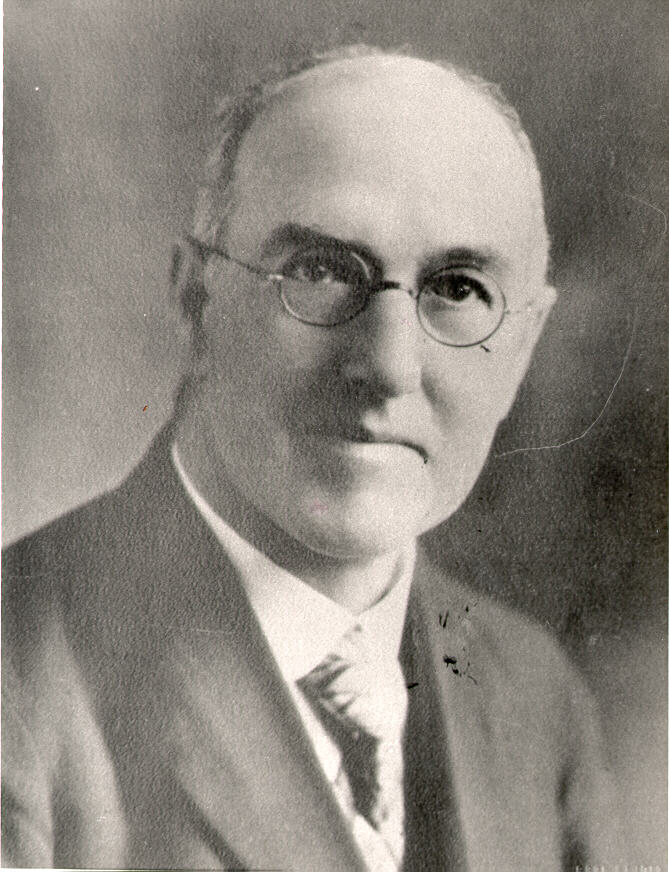

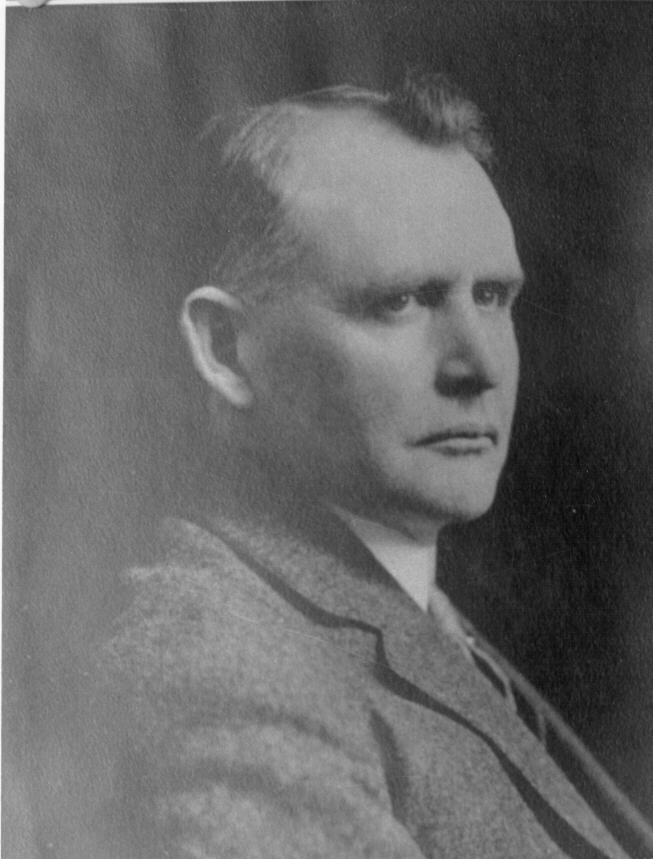
	First party	Second party
Leader	Albert C. Saunders	James D. Stewart
Party	Liberal	Conservative
Leader since	1923	1921
Leader's seat	2nd Prince	5th Kings
Last election	5 seats, 44.1%	25 seats, 52.3%
Seats won	24	6
Seat change	▲19	▼19
Popular vote	33,983	30,072
Percentage	53.1%	46.9%
Swing	▲9.0pp	▼5.4pp
Premier before election
James D. Stewart
Conservative
Premier after election
Albert C. Saunders
Liberal

The 1927 Prince Edward Island general election was held in the Canadian province of Prince Edward Island on June 25, 1927.

The opposition Liberals led by Albert C. Saunders gained many seats to defeat the incumbent government of Conservative Premier James D. Stewart.

== Party Standings ==
↓
24	6
Liberal	Conservative

Party	Party Leader	Seats			Popular Vote		
Party	Party Leader	1923	Elected	Change	#	%	Change
Liberal	Albert C. Saunders	5	24	+19	33,983	53.1%	+9.0%
Conservative	James D. Stewart	25	6	-19	30,072	46.9%	-5.4%

== Members Elected ==
The Legislature of Prince Edward Island had two levels of membership from 1893 to 1996 - Assemblymen and Councillors. This was a holdover from when the Island had a bicameral legislature, the General Assembly and the Legislative Council.

In 1893, the Legislative Council was abolished and had its membership merged with the Assembly, though the two titles remained separate and were elected by different electoral franchises. Assembleymen were elected by all eligible voters of within a district, while Councillors were only elected by landowners within a district.

=== Kings ===
District	Assemblyman	Party	Councillor	Party
1st Kings	Augustine A. MacDonald	Conservative	Harry D. McLean	Conservative
2nd Kings	Harry Cox	Liberal	James P. McIntyre	Liberal
3rd Kings	John Mustard	Liberal	Thomas V. Grant	Liberal
4th Kings	John A. Campbell	Liberal	Walter Bruce Butler	Liberal
5th Kings	Paul A. Scully	Liberal	James David Stewart	Conservative

=== Queens ===
District	Assemblyman	Party	Councillor	Party
1st Queens	Peter Sinclair	Liberal	W. F. Alan Stewart	Liberal
2nd Queens	Angus McPhee	Liberal	Bradford W. LePage	Liberal
3rd Queens	Russell C. Clark	Liberal	David McDonald	Liberal
4th Queens	J. James Larabee	Liberal	George S. Inman	Liberal
5th Queens	W. Chester S. McLure	Conservative	William J. P. MacMillan	Conservative

=== Prince ===
District	Assemblyman	Party	Councillor	Party
1st Prince	Jeremiah Blanchard	Liberal	Robert H. Gordon	Liberal
2nd Prince	Albert Charles Saunders	Liberal	William H. Dennis	Liberal
3rd Prince	Adrien Arsenault	Conservative	Harry A. Darby	Liberal
4th Prince	Horace Wright	Liberal	Walter Lea	Liberal
5th Prince	John F. MacNeill	Conservative	Lucas R. Allan	Liberal
