= 1939 Prince Edward Island general election =

Canadian provincial election

← 1935	May 18, 1939	1943 →

All 30 seats in the Legislative Assembly of Prince Edward Island 16 seats needed for a majority
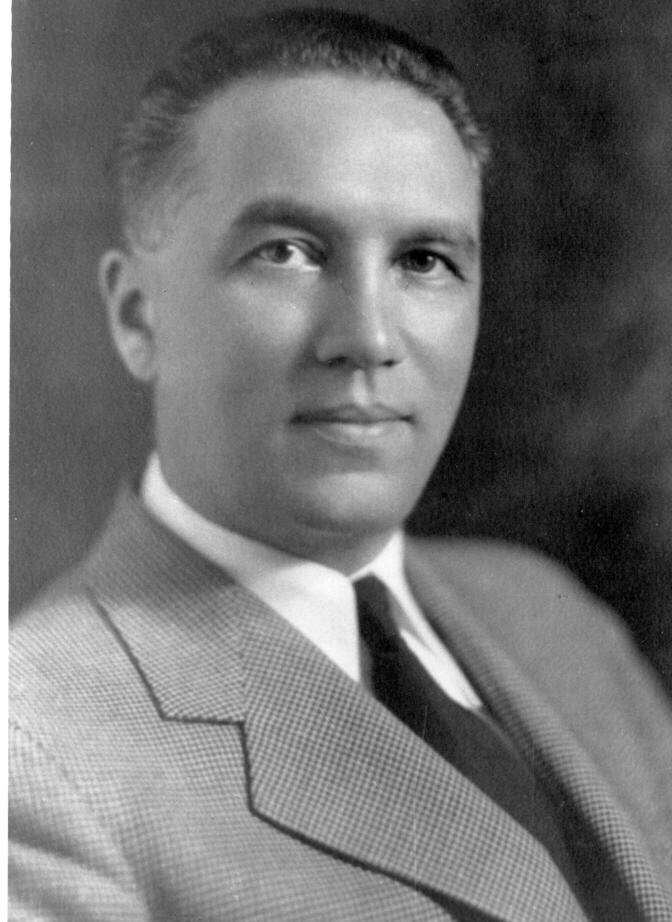

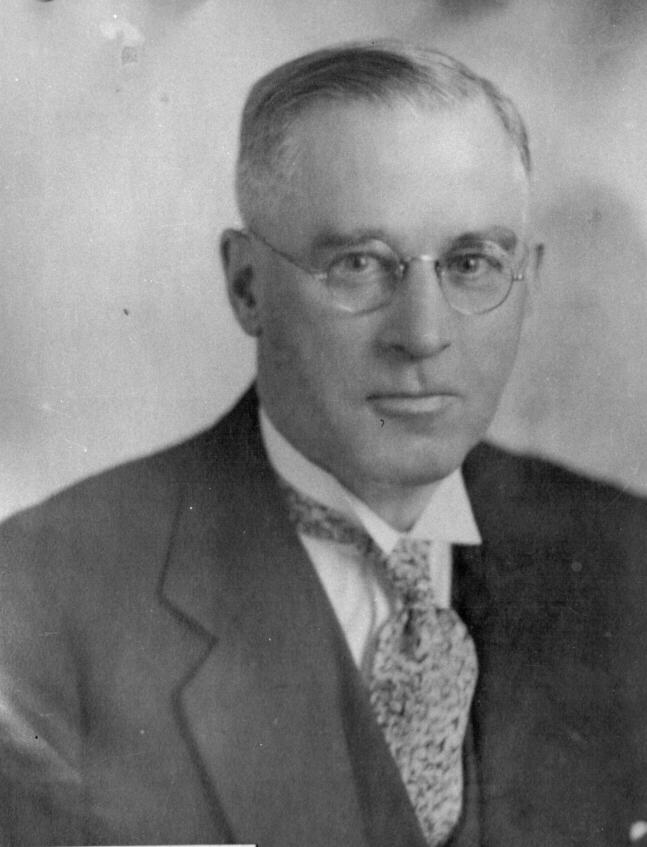
	First party	Second party
Leader	Thane Campbell	William J. P. MacMillan
Party	Liberal	Conservative
Leader since	1936	1933
Leader's seat	1st Prince	5th Queens
Last election	30 seats, 57.9%	0 seats, 42.1%
Seats won	27	3
Seat change	▼3	▲3
Popular vote	40,201	35,600
Percentage	53.0%	47.0%
Swing	▼4.9pp	▲4.9pp
Premier before election
Thane Campbell
Liberal
Premier after election
Thane Campbell
Liberal

The 1939 Prince Edward Island general election was held in the Canadian province of Prince Edward Island on May 18, 1939.

The governing Liberals of Premier Thane Campbell were able to retain a strong majority in the Legislature, though not as impressive as their total sweep of all 30 seats in the previous election. Campbell became Premier in 1936 following the death of his predecessor Walter Lea. This election was the first to see a government re-elected to a second term since the 1915 election.

The Conservatives, led by former Premier William J.P. MacMillan were able to win back three districts and return an Official Opposition to Legislature. Following the lead of the federal Conservatives in 1942, the party changed its name to the "Progressive Conservatives" (or PCs), which remains the party's name today.

== Party standings ==
↓
27	3
Liberal	Conservative

Party	Party Leader	Seats			Popular Vote		
Party	Party Leader	1935	Elected	Change	#	%	Change
Liberal	Thane Campbell	30	27	-3	40,201	53.0%	-4.9%
Conservative	William J. P. MacMillan	-	3	+3	35,600	47.0%	+4.9%

== Members elected ==
The Legislature of Prince Edward Island had two levels of membership from 1893 to 1996 - Assemblymen and Councillors. This was a holdover from when the Island had a bicameral legislature, the General Assembly and the Legislative Council.

In 1893, the Legislative Council was abolished and had its membership merged with the Assembly, though the two titles remained separate and were elected by different electoral franchises. Assembleymen were elected by all eligible voters of within a district, while Councillors were only elected by landowners within a district.

=== Kings ===
District	Assemblyman	Party	Councillor	Party
1st Kings	Herbert H. Acorn	Liberal	Peter A. MacIsaac	Liberal
2nd Kings	Harry Cox	Liberal	James P. McIntyre	Liberal
3rd Kings	John Mustard	Liberal	Francis MacPhee	Conservative
4th Kings	John A. Campbell	Liberal	Montague Annear	Liberal
5th Kings	William Hughes	Liberal	George Saville	Liberal

=== Queens ===
District	Assemblyman	Party	Councillor	Party
1st Queens	Donald N. McKay	Liberal	W. F. Alan Stewart	Liberal
2nd Queens	Angus McPhee	Liberal	Bradford W. LePage	Liberal
3rd Queens	Russell C. Clark	Liberal	Mark R. MacGuigan	Liberal
4th Queens	Dougald MacKinnon	Liberal	John Walter Jones	Liberal
5th Queens	W. F. Alan Stewart	Conservative	William J. P. MacMillan	Conservative

=== Prince ===
District	Assemblyman	Party	Councillor	Party
1st Prince	Aeneas Gallant	Liberal	Thane Alexander Campbell	Liberal
2nd Prince	George H. Barbour	Liberal	William H. Dennis	Liberal
3rd Prince	Marin Gallant	Liberal	Thomas Linkletter	Liberal
4th Prince	Cleveland Baker	Liberal	Horace Wright	Liberal
5th Prince	Edward P. Foley	Liberal	Brewer W. Robinson	Liberal
