= Gavin Duffy (disambiguation) =

Gavin Duffy (born 1960) is an Irish entrepreneur and politician.

Gavin Duffy may also refer to:

- Gavin Duffy (sportsman) (born 1981), Irish rugby union player and Gaelic footballer

== See also ==
- Gavan Duffy (1874–1958), Canadian lawyer
