= 1923 Prince Edward Island general election =

Canadian provincial election

← 1919	July 24, 1923	1927 →

All 30 seats in the Legislative Assembly of Prince Edward Island 16 seats needed for a majority
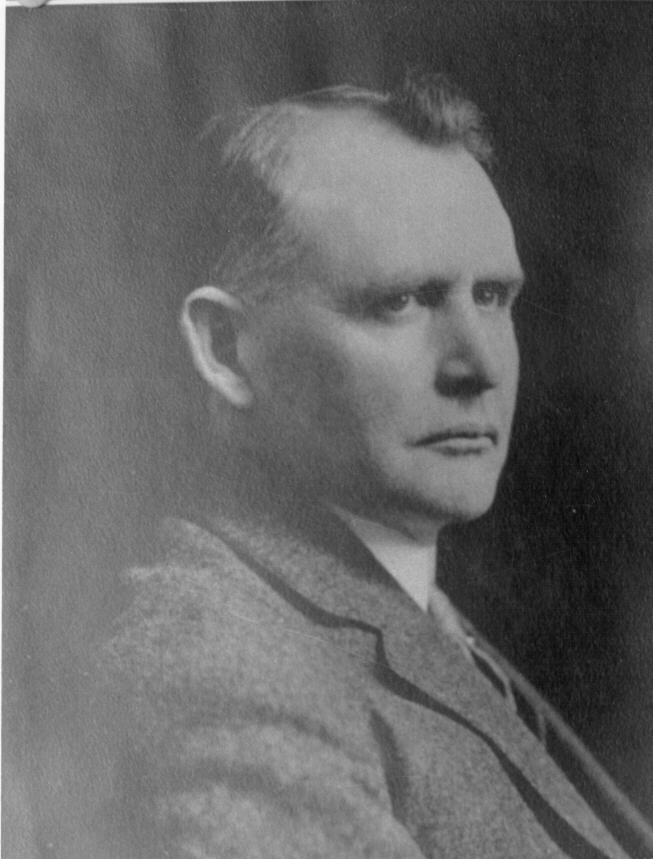

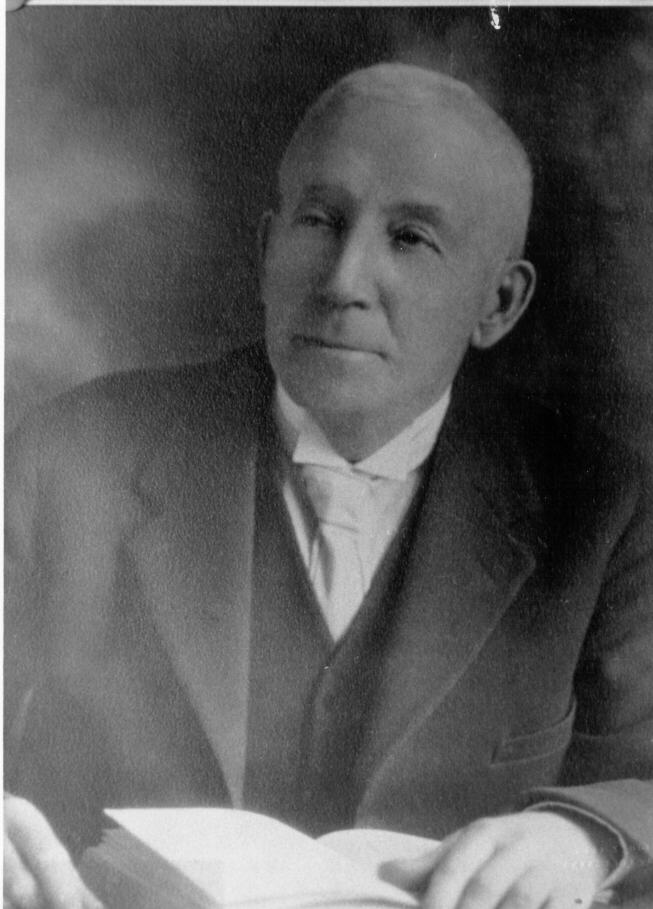
	First party	Second party
Leader	James D. Stewart	John Howatt Bell
Party	Conservative	Liberal
Leader since	1921	1915
Leader's seat	5th Kings	4th Prince (lost)
Last election	5 seats, 44.8%	24 seats, 53.5%
Seats won	25	5
Seat change	▲20	▼19
Popular vote	27,143	22,884
Percentage	52.3%	44.1%
Swing	▲7.5pp	▼9.4pp
Premier before election
John Howatt Bell
Liberal
Premier after election
James D. Stewart
Conservative

The 1923 Prince Edward Island general election was held in the Canadian province of Prince Edward Island on July 24, 1923.

The opposition Conservatives led by James D. Stewart gained many seats to defeat the incumbent government of Liberal Premier John Howatt Bell.

This election had a number of firsts for PEI. It was the first election in which women on the Island could vote, following legislation passed in 1921.

It also featured the first organized third party in a PEI election, when local members of the Progressive Party ran four candidates in three Prince County districts and collected just over 2% of the vote.

== Party Standings ==
Party	Party Leader	Seats			Popular Vote		
Party	Party Leader	1919	Elected	Change	#	%	Change
Conservative	James D. Stewart	5	25	+20	27,143	52.3%	+7.5%
Liberal	John Howatt Bell	24	5	-19	22,884	44.1%	-9.4%
Progressive		-	-	-	1,222	2.4%	+2.4%
Independent		1	-	-1	677	1.3%	-0.4%

== Members Elected ==
The Legislature of Prince Edward Island had two levels of membership from 1893 to 1996 - Assemblymen and Councillors. This was a holdover from when the Island had a bicameral legislature, the General Assembly and the Legislative Council.

In 1893, the Legislative Council was abolished and had its membership merged with the Assembly, though the two titles remained separate and were elected by different electoral franchises. Assemblymen were elected by all eligible voters of within a district, while Councillors were only elected by landowners within a district.

=== Kings ===
District	Assemblyman	Party	Councillor	Party
1st Kings	Augustine A. MacDonald	Conservative	Harry D. McLean	Conservative
2nd Kings	Harvey D. McEwen	Conservative	James B. McDonald	Conservative
3rd Kings	Leslie Hunter	Conservative	John Alexander Macdonald	Conservative
4th Kings	Maynard F. McDonald	Conservative	Albert P. Prowse	Conservative
5th Kings	J. Howard MacDonald	Conservative	James David Stewart	Conservative

=== Queens ===
District	Assemblyman	Party	Councillor	Party
1st Queens	Murdock Kennedy	Conservative	Alexander McNevin	Conservative
2nd Queens	John Buntain	Conservative	Louis Jenkins	Conservative
3rd Queens	Leonard J. Wood	Conservative	J. Augustine MacDonald	Conservative
4th Queens	James C. Irving	Liberal	Shaw McMillan	Conservative
5th Queens	W. Chester S. McLure	Conservative	William J. P. MacMillan	Conservative

=== Prince ===
District	Assemblyman	Party	Councillor	Party
1st Prince	Jeremiah Blanchard	Liberal	Wilfred Tanton	Conservative
2nd Prince	Albert Charles Saunders	Liberal	William H. Dennis	Liberal
3rd Prince	Adrien Arsenault	Conservative	Thomas MacNutt	Conservative
4th Prince	Whitefield Bentley	Conservative	John H. Myers	Conservative
5th Prince	James A. MacNeill	Conservative	Creelman McArthur	Liberal
