= 1919 Prince Edward Island general election =

Canadian provincial election

← 1915	July 24, 1919	1923 →

All 30 seats in the Legislative Assembly of Prince Edward Island 16 seats needed for a majority
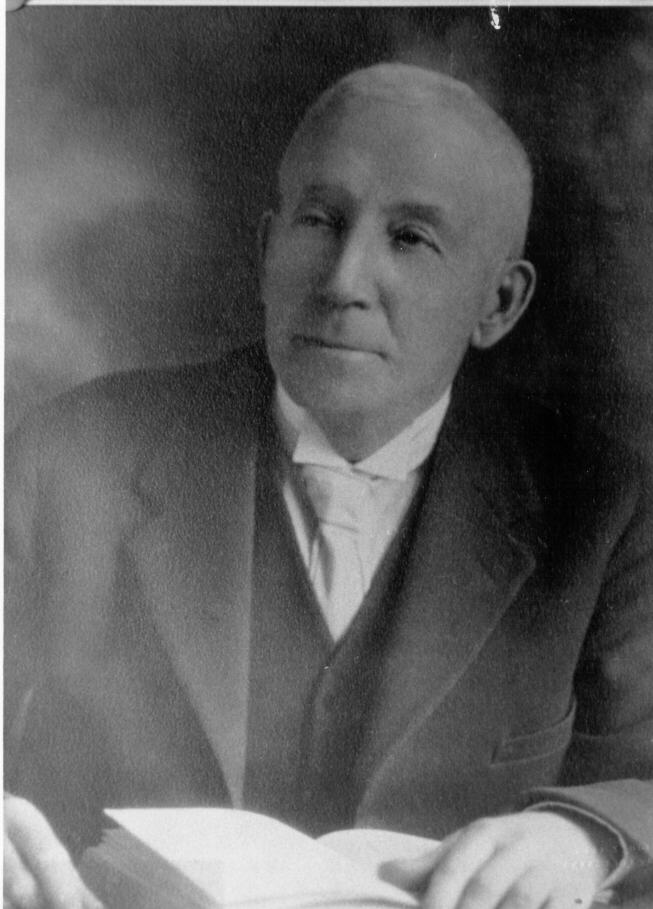

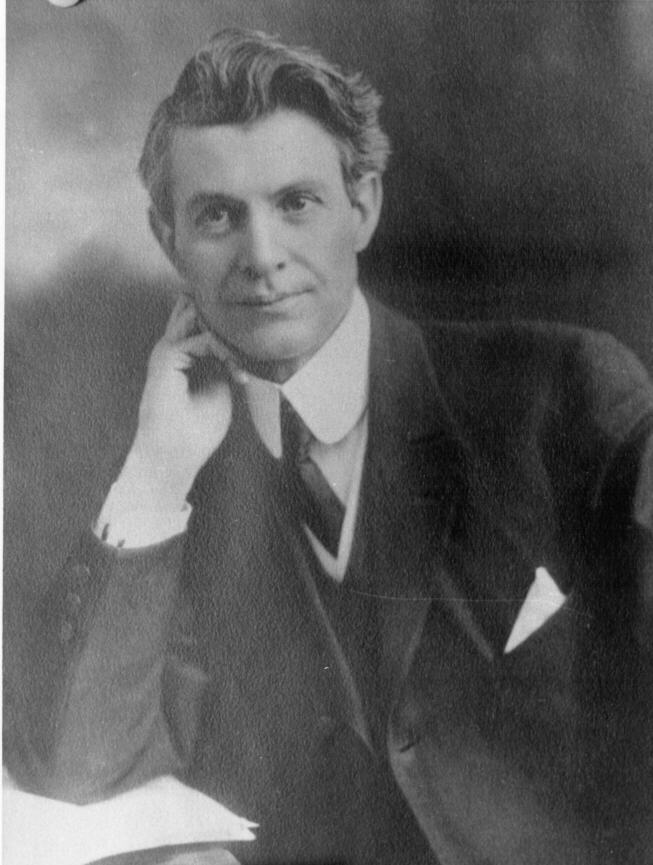
	First party	Second party
Leader	John Howatt Bell	Aubin E. Arsenault
Party	Liberal	Progressive Conservative
Leader since	1915	1917
Leader's seat	4th Prince	3rd Prince
Last election	13 seats, 49.9%	17 seats, 50.1%
Seats won	24	5
Seat change	▲11	▼12
Popular vote	19,910	16,669
Percentage	53.5%	44.8%
Swing	▲3.6pp	▼5.3pp
Premier before election
Aubin E. Arsenault
Conservative
Premier after election
John Howatt Bell
Liberal

The 1919 Prince Edward Island general election was held in the Canadian province of Prince Edward Island on July 24, 1919.

The opposition Liberals led by John Howatt Bell gained eleven seats to defeat the incumbent government of Conservative Premier Aubin E. Arsenault, who had succeeded former Premier John A. Mathieson in 1917.

John A. Dewar, a former Conservative member, was elected as an Independent Assemblyman for 3rd Kings.

== Party Standings ==
Party	Party Leader	Seats			Popular Vote		
Party	Party Leader	1915	Elected	Change	#	%	Change
Liberal	John Howatt Bell	13	24	+11	19,910	53.5%	+3.6%
Conservative	Aubin E. Arsenault	17	5	-12	16,669	44.8%	-5.3%
Independent		-	1	+1	646	1.7%	+1.7%

== Members Elected ==
The Legislature of Prince Edward Island had two levels of membership from 1893 to 1996 - Assemblymen and Councillors. This was a holdover from when the Island had a bicameral legislature, the General Assembly and the Legislative Council.

In 1893, the Legislative Council was abolished and had its membership merged with the Assembly, though the two titles remained separate and were elected by different electoral franchises. Assembly men were elected by all eligible voters of within a district, while Councillors were only elected by landowners within a district.

=== Kings ===
District	Assemblyman	Party	Councillor	Party
1st Kings	Daniel C. MacDonald	Liberal	Harry D. McLean	Conservative
2nd Kings	Robert Cox	Liberal	James P. McIntyre	Liberal
3rd Kings	John A. Dewar	Independent	James J. Johnston	Liberal
4th Kings	Wallace B. Butler	Liberal	William G. Sutherland	Liberal
5th Kings	Stephen Hessian	Liberal	James David Stewart	Conservative

=== Queens ===
District	Assemblyman	Party	Councillor	Party
1st Queens	Murdock Kennedy	Conservative	Cyrus Crosby	Liberal
2nd Queens	Bradford W. LePage	Liberal	George E. Hughes	Liberal
3rd Queens	Peter Brodie	Liberal	David McDonald	Liberal
4th Queens	James C. Irving	Liberal	Frederick J. Nash	Liberal
5th Queens	Edmund Higgs	Liberal	Gavan Duffy	Liberal

=== Prince ===
District	Assemblyman	Party	Councillor	Party
1st Prince	Benjamin Gallant	Liberal	Christopher Metherall	Liberal
2nd Prince	Albert Charles Saunders	Liberal	William H. Dennis	Liberal
3rd Prince	Aubin Edmond Arsenault	Conservative	Alfred E. MacLean	Liberal
4th Prince	John Howatt Bell	Liberal	Walter Lea	Liberal
5th Prince	James A. MacNeill	Conservative	Creelman McArthur	Liberal
