= Gavan Duffy (surname) =

Gavan Duffy is a compound surname. A list of people with the name include:

- C. Gavan Duffy (1874–1958), Canadian politician and judge
- Charles Gavan Duffy (1816–1903), Irish and Australian editor, politician, and jurist
- Charles Cashel Gavan Duffy (1855–1932), Australian public servant
- Charles Leonard Gavan Duffy (1882–1961), Australian judge
- Frank Gavan Duffy (1852–1936), Australian jurist
- George Gavan Duffy (1882–1951), Irish politician and jurist
- Louise Gavan Duffy (1884–1969), Irish nationalist and Irish language enthusiast who founded an Irish language school

== See also ==
- Gavan Duffy (1874–1958), Canadian politician and jurist.
- Gavin Duffy (born 1981), Irish rugby player
