= 1915 Prince Edward Island general election =

Canadian provincial election

- September 16, 1915

All 30 seats in the Legislative Assembly of Prince Edward Island 16 seats needed for a majority
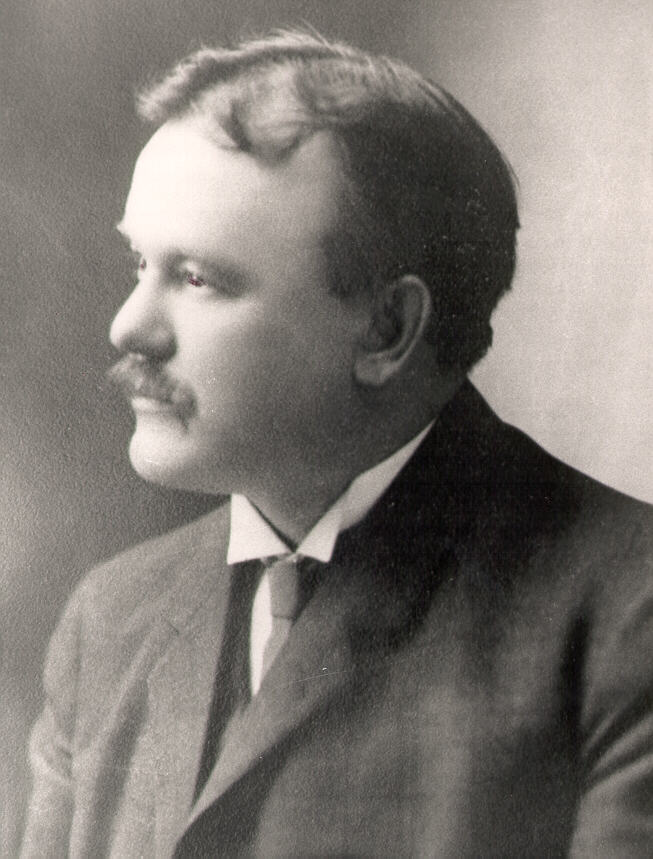
	First party	Second party
		LIB
Leader	John A. Mathieson	unknown
Party	Conservative	Liberal
Leader since	1903	-
Leader's seat	5th Kings	-
Last election	28 seats, 59.2%	2 seats, 40.8%
Seats won	17	13
Seat change	▼11	▲11
Popular vote	17,179	17,097
Percentage	50.1%	49.9%
Swing	▼9.1pp	▲9.1pp
Premier before election
John A. Mathieson
Conservative
Premier after election
John A. Mathieson
Conservative

The 1915 Prince Edward Island general election was held in the Canadian province of Prince Edward Island on September 16, 1915. The election was held in the midst of the First World War.

The election was won by the governing Conservatives, led by incumbent Premier John A. Mathieson, whose government lost a large number of seats as the opposition Liberals won back a number of districts lost in previous elections.

The Liberals in this election were able to climb up from one of their worst electoral defeats in 1912 to nearly topple the Mathieson government. However, it is unknown who the Liberal leader was during the election, if there was one at all. Previous Official Opposition Leader John Richards chose not to run in this election, while his successor John Howatt Bell was chosen as leader following the election. It is possible the Liberals did not have an official leader for this election.

== Party Standings ==
Party	Party Leader	Seats		Popular Vote	
Party	Party Leader	1912	Elected	#	%
Conservative	John A. Mathieson	28	17	17,179	50.1%
Liberal	unknown	2	13	17,097	49.9%

== Members Elected ==
The Legislature of Prince Edward Island had two levels of membership from 1893 to 1996 - Assemblymen and Councillors. This was a holdover from when the Island had a bicameral legislature, the General Assembly and the Legislative Council.

In 1893, the Legislative Council was abolished and had its membership merged with the Assembly, though the two titles remained separate and were elected by different electoral franchises. Assemblymen were elected by all eligible voters within a district, while Councillors were only elected by landowners within a district.

=== Kings ===
District	Assemblyman	Party	Councillor	Party
1st Kings	Augustine A. MacDonald	Conservative	John McLean	Conservative
2nd Kings	Harvey D. McEwen	Conservative	James D. McInnis	Liberal
3rd Kings	John A. Dewar	Conservative	James J. Johnston	Liberal
4th Kings	Albert P. Prowse	Conservative	Murdock MacKinnon	Conservative
5th Kings	Roderick J. McLellan	Conservative	John Alexander Mathieson	Conservative

=== Queens ===
District	Assemblyman	Party	Councillor	Party
1st Queens	Murdock Kennedy	Conservative	Alexander McNevin	Conservative
2nd Queens	George E. Hughes	Liberal	John McMillan	Liberal
3rd Queens	Leonard Wood	Conservative	David McDonald	Liberal
4th Queens	John S. Martin	Conservative	George Forbes	Liberal
5th Queens	James Paton	Conservative	Stephen R. Jenkins	Conservative

=== Prince ===
District	Assemblyman	Party	Councillor	Party
1st Prince	Benjamin Gallant	Liberal	Charles E. Dalton	Conservative
2nd Prince	Albert Charles Saunders	Liberal	William H. Dennis	Liberal
3rd Prince	Aubin Edmond Arsenault	Conservative	Alfred E. MacLean	Liberal
4th Prince	John Howatt Bell*	Liberal	Walter Lea	Liberal
5th Prince	James A. MacNeill	Conservative	Hubert Howatt	Liberal

- John Howatt Bell named Leader of the Official Opposition and Liberal Party Leader following the election
