= George Des Brisay de Blois =

Canadian politician and merchant (1887-1964)

The Honourable George DesBrisay DeBlois

14th Lieutenant Governor of Prince Edward Island
- In office December 28, 1933 – October 1, 1939
- Monarchs: George V Edward VIII; George VI
- Governors General: The Earl of Bessborough; The Lord Tweedsmuir
- Premier: William J. P. MacMillan; Walter Lea; Thane Campbell
- Preceded by: Charles Dalton
- Succeeded by: Bradford William LePage

Personal details
- Born: October 21, 1887 Charlottetown, Prince Edward Island
- Died: April 22, 1958 (aged 70) Charlottetown, Prince Edward Island
- Spouse: Marion Newberry (m. 1915)
- Children: Robert, Gordon and Helen
- Education: St. Peter's School
- Occupation: Wholesale merchant and exporter
- Profession: Politician

George DesBrisay DeBlois (October 21, 1887 – April 22, 1958) was a wholesale merchant and political figure on Prince Edward Island. He served as 14th Lieutenant Governor of Prince Edward Island from December 1933 to September 1939.

He was born in Charlottetown, Prince Edward Island, the son of Robert Fitzgerald DeBlois and Ethel Helen DesBrisay, and educated at Saint Peter's Collegiate. DeBlois married Marion Ella Newbery in 1915. He was commissioner for the Provincial Tuberculosis Sanatorium.
