= Henry Beer =

Canadian politician

Henry Beer (7 June 1835 – 2 August 1886) was a merchant and political figure in Prince Edward Island. A Liberal he represented 3rd Queens in the Legislative Assembly of Prince Edward Island from 1870 to 1879 and from 1883 to 1886. Beer was also the ninth mayor of Charlottetown from 1885 until his death in 1886.

Beer was born in Charlottetown, the son of George Beer and Mary Ann Holland. In 1857, he married Amelia Ings. Beer served as a member of the Executive Council from 1872 to 1873 and was speaker for the provincial assembly from 1877 to 1879. He also served as lieutenant-colonel in the local militia. Beer was defeated when he ran for reelection in 1879 and in 1886.

Beer died in Charlottetown at the age of 51.

Beer's daughter Annie Augusta married William S. Stewart.
