= Frank Richard Heartz =

Canadian politician

The Honourable Frank Richard Heartz
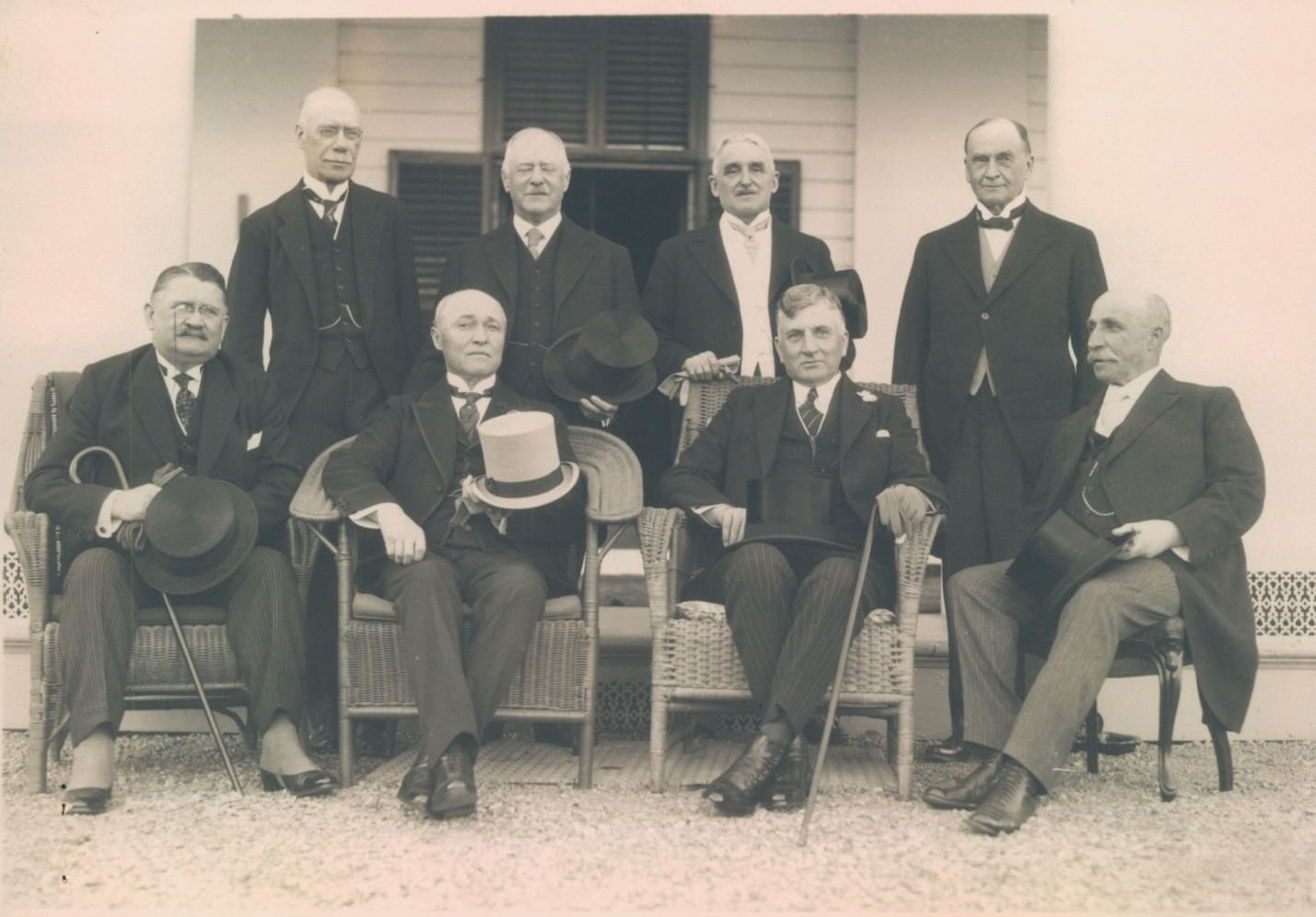
- Frank Richard Heartz, standing second from right.

25th Lieutenant Governor of Prince Edward Island
- In office September 8, 1924 – November 29, 1930
- Monarch: George V
- Governors General: The Viscount Byng of Vimy; The Viscount Willingdon
- Premier: James D. Stewart; Albert C. Saunders; Walter Lea
- Preceded by: Murdoch MacKinnon
- Succeeded by: Charles Dalton

Personal details
- Born: January 7, 1871 Charlottetown, Prince Edward Island Colony
- Died: August 27, 1955 (aged 84) Charlottetown, Prince Edward Island, Canada
- Party: Liberal
- Spouse: Bessie Matthew (m. 1895)
- Children: Frances Ruth
- Education: Prince of Wales College; Upper Canada College
- Occupation: businessman and farmer
- Profession: Politician

Frank Richard Heartz (7 January 1871 – 27 August 1955) was a Canadian politician who served as the 25th Lieutenant Governor of Prince Edward Island.

He was born in 1871 in Charlottetown, Prince Edward Island, the son of Benjamin Heartz and Henrietta Davison. He was educated in local public schools, followed by Prince of Wales College and Upper Canada College.

He married Bessie Matthew of Souris on September 25, 1895.

In his political career, Heartz ran for the 1st Kings District in the Provincial Legislative Assembly in 1909 but was defeated. Heartz was appointed Lieutenant-Governor of Prince Edward Island on September 8, 1924, and served until November 19, 1930. He died in Charlottetown.
