= Carrol Delaney =

Canadian politician

Carrol Wilfred Delaney (May 20, 1909 – June 25, 1971) was a farmer, fur rancher, businessperson and political figure on Prince Edward Island. He represented 5th Prince in the Legislative Assembly of Prince Edward Island from 1947 to 1951 as a Liberal.

He was born in Summerside, Prince Edward Island, the son of Dr. Mark Delaney and Mary Cosgrove. He was married twice: to Josephine Arsenault in 1930 and later to Alice Toombs. Delaney served on the town council for Summerside. He raised fox and mink for fur and grew potatoes. Delaney was also a ticketing agent for the Canadian National Railway and owned a construction and trucking company. He ran unsuccessfully for a seat in the provincial assembly in a 1946 by-election, losing to Francis J. MacNeill. Delaney defeated MacNeill in the 1947 general election. He later moved to Hunter River, where he died at the age of 62.
