= William S. Stewart =

Canadian politician

William Snodgrass Stewart (February 13, 1855 – February 11, 1938) was a lawyer, judge and political figure on Prince Edward Island. He represented 5th Queens in the Legislative Assembly of Prince Edward Island from 1912 to 1914 as a Conservative.

He was born in Marshfield, Prince Edward Island, the son of Alexander Stewart, and was educated at Prince of Wales College, Dalhousie University and McGill University. He studied law with Frederick Peters, was called to the bar in 1883 and set up practice in Summerside. Stewart later moved to Charlottetown. In 1892, he married Annie Augusta, the daughter of Henry Beer. Stewart ran unsuccessfully for a seat in the provincial assembly in 1893 and 1908 and for a seat in the House of Commons in 1900. Stewart served in the province's Executive Council as a minister without portfolio from 1912 to 1914. He resigned his seat in that year after he was named a judge for Queens County. In 1920, he was named to the Admiralty Court. Stewart retired from the bench in 1930. He was mayor of Charlottetown from 1932 to 1934. He died in Charlottetown at the age of 82.
