= James Paton (Prince Edward Island politician) =

Scottish-born merchant and political figure

James Paton (June 5, 1853 – September 16, 1935) was a Scottish-born merchant and political figure in Prince Edward Island, Canada. He was 14th mayor of Charlottetown from 1906 to 1908, and he represented 5th Queens in the Legislative Assembly of Prince Edward Island from 1915 to 1919 as a Conservative member.

Patton was born in Paisley, the son of Alexander Paton, who was involved in the design and manufacture of shawls there, and Elizabeth McKechnie. After completing his education, Paton was employed in a goods and drapery business there for six years. He then came to Charlottetown, where he worked for a time for a dry goods merchant. Paton then joined the firm of Weeks and Findlay, going on to become a partner with Mr. Weeks and later sole owner of the business. In 1880, he married Eva Melcora Auderson. He married Florence Gertrude Brown in 1887 following the death of his first wife. Paton was also vice-president of the Canadian Retail Furniture Dealers' Association and of the Union of Canadian Municipalities. He was an unsuccessful candidate for a seat in the provincial assembly in the 1897, 1900, and 1919 general elections.
