= William C. Lea =

Canadian politician

William Charles Lea (March 22, 1833 – March 1911) was a farmer and political figure on Prince Edward Island. He represented 4th Prince in the Legislative Assembly of Prince Edward Island from 1876 to 1879 as a Liberal.

He was born in Tryon, Prince Edward Island, the son of John Lea and Hannah Maxfield. He was married twice: to Rebecca E. Reid in 1858 and to Annie Murphy in 1865. In 1866, he moved to Victoria where he owned a farm.

His son Walter later served as the province's premier.
