= 1935 Prince Edward Island general election =

Canadian provincial election

- July 23, 1935

30 seats of the Legislative Assembly of Prince Edward Island 16 seats needed for a majority
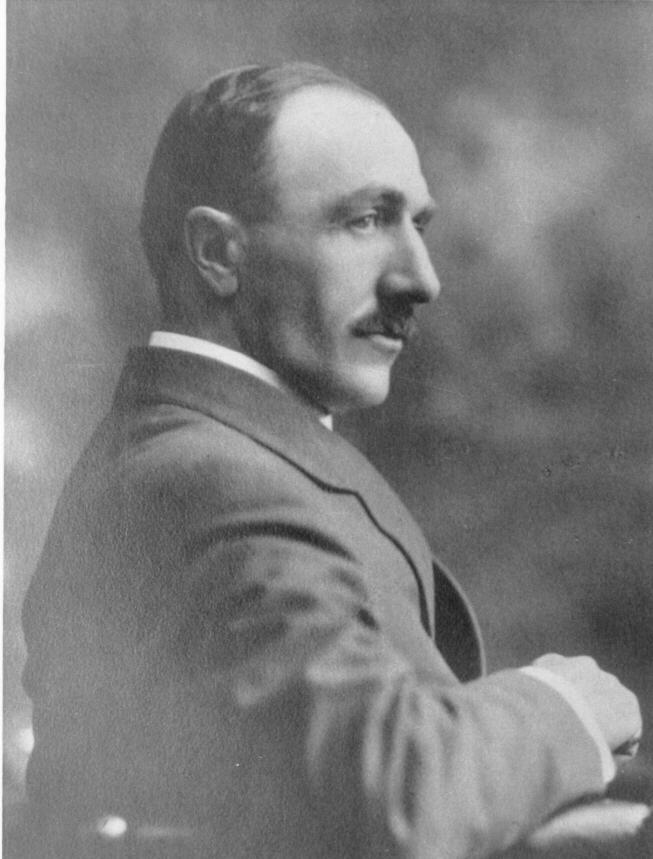

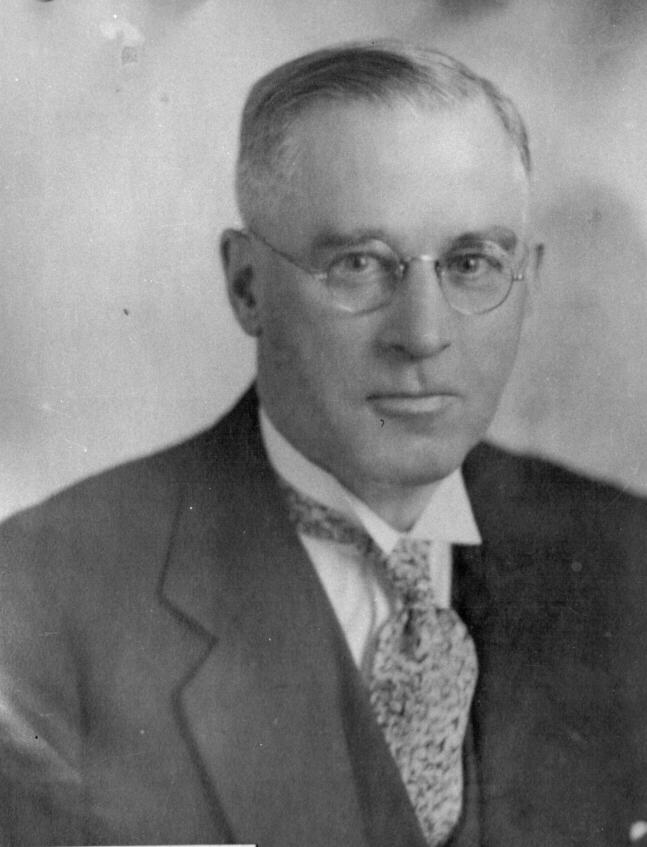
	First party	Second party
Leader	Walter Lea	William J. P. MacMillan
Party	Liberal	Conservative
Leader since	1930	1933
Leader's seat	4th Prince	5th Queens (lost)
Last election	12 seats, 48.3%	18 seats, 51.7%
Seats won	30	0
Seat change	▲18	▼18
Popular vote	43,824	31,840
Percentage	57.9%	42.1%
Swing	▲9.6pp	▼9.6pp
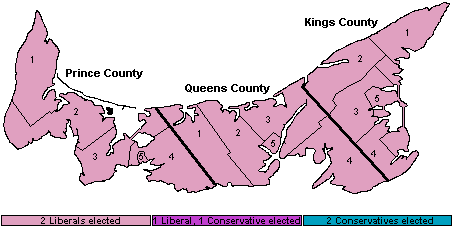
- Map of PEI's ridings coloured in based on how they voted
Premier before election
William J. P. MacMillan
Conservative
Premier after election
Walter Lea
Liberal

The 1935 Prince Edward Island general election was held in the Canadian province of Prince Edward Island on 23 July 1935. The Liberal Party led by Walter Lea swept the board by winning every seat in every constituency. This was the first time that a government in the British Commonwealth would face no opposition in an elected chamber. To date, that feat has only been accomplished one other time in Canadian history, the 1987 New Brunswick election. It was also the first time that a ruling party lost all of their seats.

== Background ==
The 1935 election took place in the shadow of the Great Depression. In 1931, the Conservative Party, then under James David Stewart, defeated the incumbent Liberal government, installing Stewart as Premier. As Premier, Stewart worked to get federal assistance in combating the Depression, but stress caused him to die in office in 1933.

When Stewart's health was failing, he was replaced by Acting Premier William J. P. MacMillan, who took over for Stewart upon his death. MacMillan continued Stewart's policies of increased economic spending and government assistance, until the election in 1935.

Walter Lea, a farmer by trade, had been elected to the Legislature in 1915, and had been Premier before Stewart from 1930–31. During his time as Premier, he "undertook many initiatives to improve and diversify the island’s agricultural industry". After his loss to James Stewart, he continued in opposition until 1935. By the time the 1935 election came around, Lea was very ill. He coordinated most of the campaign "from a hospital bed for six weeks, and then from his home for the remainder of the election. He made only one public appearance during the entire campaign".

== Results ==
↓
30
Liberal

Party	Party Leader	Seats			Popular Vote		
Party	Party Leader	1931	Elected	Change	#	%	Change
Liberal	Walter Lea	12	30	+18	43,824	57.9%	+9.6%
Conservative	William J. P. MacMillan	18	-	-18	31,840	42.1%	-9.6%

The Liberal Party, under Lea, won all 30 seats in the House of Assembly, a feat that had never been accomplished before in the Commonwealth. News media across the Commonwealth broadcast the story. When faced with this unusual institutional setup, Lea had several members of his own party act as members of the opposition, as an actual opposition party did not exist within the legislature. This step was also used in the New Brunswick Legislative Assembly after the 1987 election, in which the New Brunswick Liberal Party won all 58 seats in the Legislative Assembly.

Lea died a few months into his mandate, and was replaced by Thane Campbell, who served as Premier until 1943.

== Members ==
The Legislature of Prince Edward Island had two levels of membership from 1893 to 1996 - Assemblymen and Councillors. This was a holdover from when the Island had a bicameral legislature, the General Assembly and the Legislative Council.

In 1893, the Legislative Council was abolished and had its membership merged with the Assembly, though the two titles remained separate and were elected by different electoral franchises. Assembleymen were elected by all eligible voters of within a district, while Councillors were only elected by landowners within a district.

=== Kings ===
District	Assemblyman	Party	Councillor	Party
1st Kings	Peter A. MacIsaac	Liberal	Herbert H. Acorn	Liberal
2nd Kings	Harry Cox	Liberal	James P. McIntyre	Liberal
3rd Kings	John Mustard	Liberal	Stephen Hessian	Liberal
4th Kings	John A. Campbell	Liberal	Montague Annear	Liberal
5th Kings	William Hughes	Liberal	George Saville	Liberal

=== Queens ===
District	Assemblyman	Party	Councillor	Party
1st Queens	Donald N. McKay	Liberal	W. F. Alan Stewart	Liberal
2nd Queens	Angus McPhee	Liberal	Bradford W. LePage	Liberal
3rd Queens	Russell C. Clark	Liberal	Mark R. MacGuigan	Liberal
4th Queens	Dougald MacKinnon	Liberal	John Walter Jones	Liberal
5th Queens	T. William L. Prowse	Liberal	C. St. Clair Trainor	Liberal

=== Prince ===
District	Assemblyman	Party	Councillor	Party
1st Prince	Aeneas Gallant	Liberal	Thane Alexander Campbell	Liberal
2nd Prince	George H. Barbour	Liberal	William H. Dennis	Liberal
3rd Prince	Marin Gallant	Liberal	Thomas Linkletter	Liberal
4th Prince	Cleveland Baker	Liberal	Walter Lea	Liberal
5th Prince	Edward P. Foley	Liberal	Lucas R. Allan	Liberal
