= List of islands of Prince Edward Island =

The main island of Prince Edward Island is surrounded by smaller islands.

This is a list of islands of the Atlantic Canadian province of Prince Edward Island besides the main island (with the same name):

- Boughton Island, 240 hectares (593 acres), third largest overall, uninhabited but popular for day visits for hiking and picknicking
- Bunbury Island
- Cascumpeque Sand Hills
- Conway Sand Hills
- George Island
- Glenfinnan Island
- Governors Island, 32 hectares (79 acres), privately owned
- Grover (Ram) Island
- Holman Island
- Malpeque Bay Islands
  - Mary Fraser Island
  - Courtin Island
  - Little Courtin Island
  - Little Rock
  - Ram Island
  - Bird Island
  - Lennox Island, home of the Lennox Island First Nation of the Mi'kmaq people
  - Hog Island, a barrier island forming the northern boundary of Malpeque Bay
  - Fish Island, a section of Hog Island that occasionally separates/joins due to erosion and accretion
- Murray Islands, a group of islands within Murray Harbour
  - Cherry Island
  - Gordons Island
  - Herring Island
  - Reynolds Island
  - Thomas Island
- Oultons Island
- Panmure Island, 324 hectares (801 acres), red sandstone with sandy beaches, home of a community of the same name and Panmure Island Provincial Park
- Robinson's Island
- St. Peter's Island
