= 1931 Prince Edward Island general election =

Canadian provincial election

- August 6, 1931

All 30 seats in the Legislative Assembly of Prince Edward Island 16 seats needed for a majority
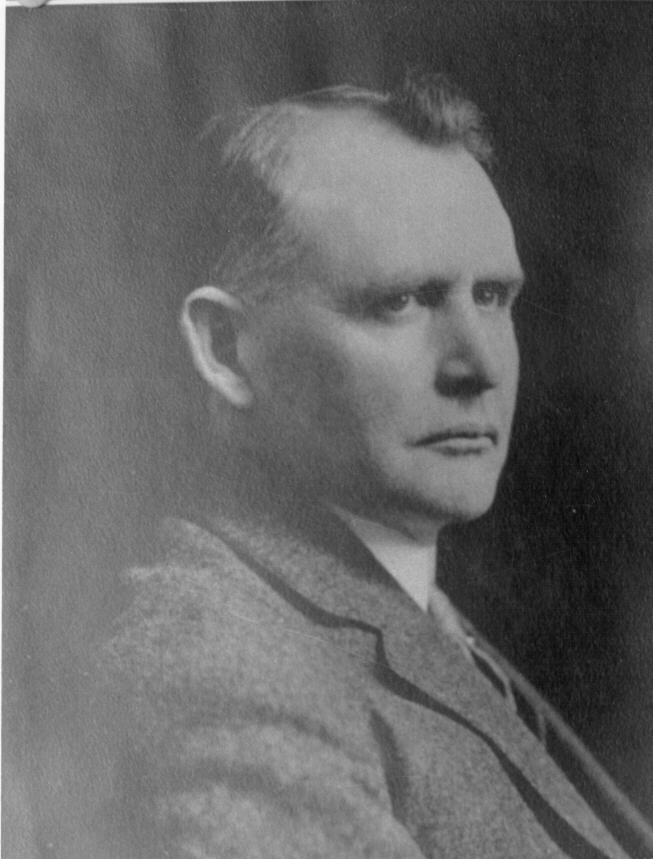

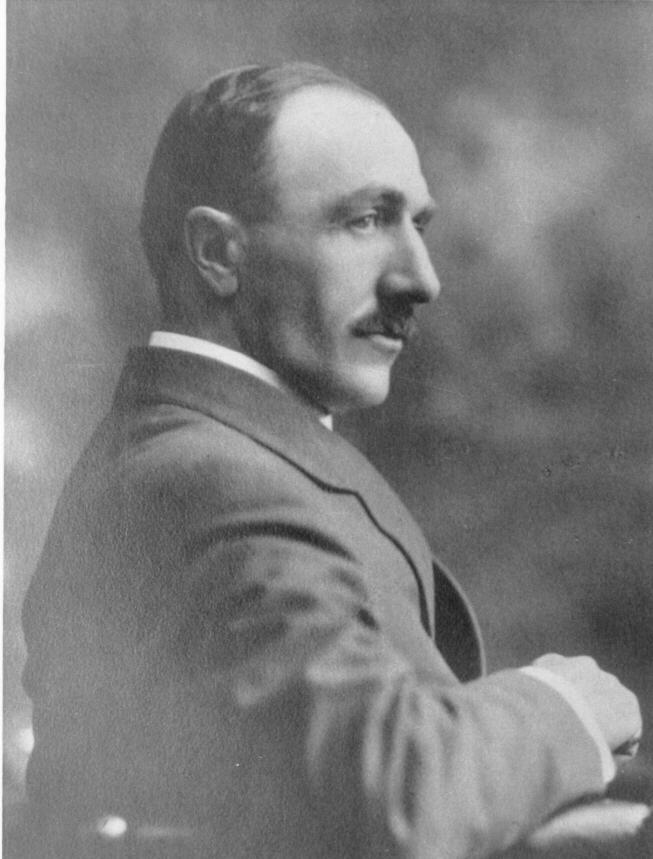
	First party	Second party
Leader	James D. Stewart	Walter Lea
Party	Conservative	Liberal
Leader since	1921	1930
Leader's seat	5th Kings	4th Prince
Last election	6 seats, 46.9%	24 seats, 53.1%
Seats won	18	12
Seat change	▲12	▼12
Popular vote	36,219	33,836
Percentage	51.7%	48.3%
Swing	▲4.8pp	▼4.8pp
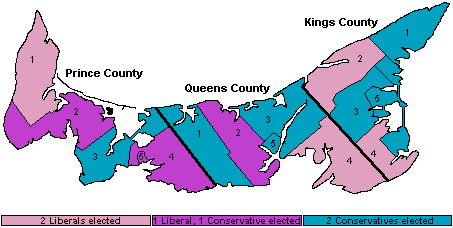
- Map of PEI's ridings coloured in based on how they voted
Premier before election
Walter Lea
Liberal
Premier after election
James D. Stewart
Conservative

The 1931 Prince Edward Island general election was held on 6 August 1931 in the Canadian Province of Prince Edward Island. The governing Liberals of Premier Walter Lea were defeated by the Conservatives led by James D. Stewart.

== Party standings ==
↓
18	12
Conservative	Liberal

Party	Party Leader	Seats			Popular Vote		
Party	Party Leader	1927	Elected	Change	#	%	Change
Conservative	James D. Stewart	6	18	+12	36,219	51.7%	+4.8%
Liberal	Walter Lea	24	12	-12	33,836	48.3%	-4.8%

== Members elected ==
The Legislature of Prince Edward Island had two levels of membership from 1893 to 1996 - Assemblymen and Councillors. This was a holdover from when the Island had a bicameral legislature, the General Assembly and the Legislative Council.

In 1893, the Legislative Council was abolished and had its membership merged with the Assembly, though the two titles remained separate and were elected by different electoral franchises. Assembleymen were elected by all eligible voters of within a district, while Councillors were only elected by landowners within a district.

=== Kings ===
District	Assemblyman	Party	Councillor	Party
1st Kings	Augustine A. MacDonald	Conservative	Harry D. McLean	Conservative
2nd Kings	Harry Cox	Liberal	James P. McIntyre	Liberal
3rd Kings	Leslie Hunter	Conservative	Francis MacPhee	Conservative
4th Kings	John A. Campbell	Liberal	Montague Annear	Liberal
5th Kings	J. Howard MacDonald	Conservative	James David Stewart	Conservative

=== Queens ===
District	Assemblyman	Party	Councillor	Party
1st Queens	Thomas Wigmore	Conservative	Walter G. MacKenzie	Conservative
2nd Queens	David F. Bethune	Conservative	Bradford W. LePage	Liberal
3rd Queens	Matthew W. Wood	Conservative	J. Augustine MacDonald	Conservative
4th Queens	J. James Larabee	Liberal	Callum J. Bruce	Liberal
5th Queens	W. Allen Stewart	Conservative	William Joseph Parnell MacMillan	Conservative

=== Prince ===
District	Assemblyman	Party	Councillor	Party
1st Prince	Aeneas Gallant	Liberal	Thane Alexander Campbell	Liberal
2nd Prince	Shelton Sharp	Conservative	William H. Dennis	Liberal
3rd Prince	Adrien Arsenault	Conservative	Thomas MacNutt	Conservative
4th Prince	Heath Strong	Conservative	Walter Lea	Liberal
5th Prince	Leonard M. MacNeill	Conservative	Lucas Allen	Liberal
