= Jeannine Pelland =

Canadian nurse

Jeannine Pelland (born 21 May 1931 in Montreal) is a former President of the Order of nurses of Quebec.
