= Thane Campbell =

Canadian politician

The Honourable Thane Campbell CC
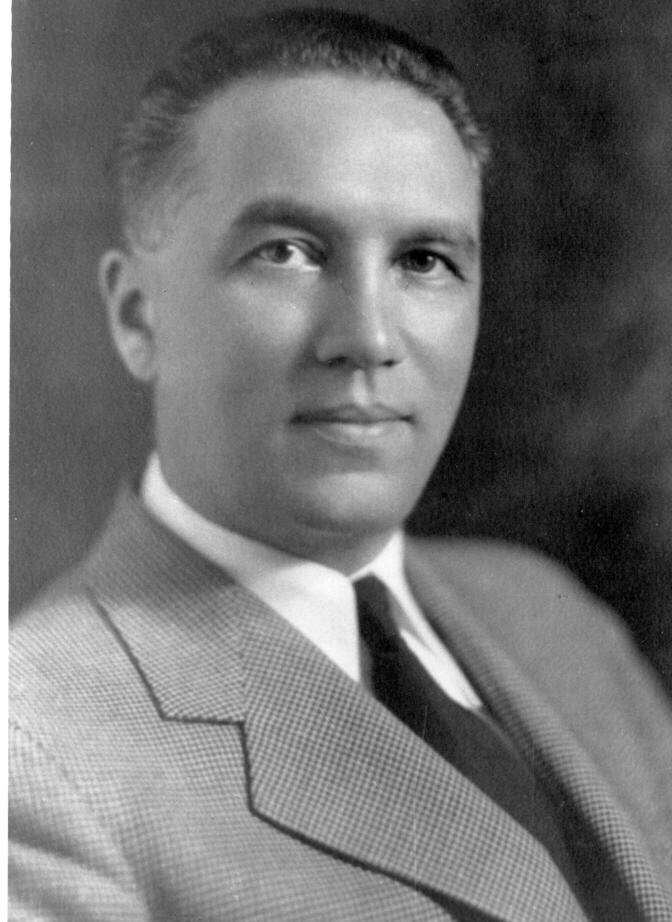

19th Premier of Prince Edward Island
- In office January 14, 1936 – May 11, 1943
- Monarchs: George V Edward VIII; George VI
- Lieutenant Governor: George DesBrisay DeBlois; Bradford W. LePage
- Preceded by: Walter Lea
- Succeeded by: John Walter Jones

Leader of the Prince Edward Island Liberal Party
- In office January 14, 1936 – May 11, 1943
- Preceded by: Walter Lea
- Succeeded by: John Walter Jones

MLA (Councillor) for 1st Prince
- In office August 6, 1931 – May 11, 1943
- Preceded by: Robert H. Gordon
- Succeeded by: Joseph A. Bernard

Personal details
- Born: July 7, 1895 Summerside, Prince Edward Island
- Died: September 28, 1978 (aged 83) Ottawa, Ontario
- Party: Liberal
- Spouse: Cecilia Bradshaw
- Children: 4, including Alex
- Education: Saint Dunstan's University; Dalhousie University; Corpus Christi College, Oxford
- Occupation: Lawyer and judge
- Profession: Politician
- Cabinet: Attorney General (1930–1931); Attorney and Advocate General (1935–1936)

Thane Alexander Campbell, CC (July 7, 1895 – September 28, 1978) was a Prince Edward Island politician and jurist, who served as the 19th premier of Prince Edward Island from 1936 to 1943.

== Early life ==
Born in Summerside, Prince Edward Island, the son of Alexander and Clara (Muttart) Campbell, Campbell was educated at Summerside Public School and Prince of Wales College. He received a Bachelor of Arts from Saint Dunstan's University and Master of Arts from Dalhousie University. A Rhodes Scholar, he received a Master of Arts degree from Corpus Christi College, Oxford. Returning to PEI in 1922, he read law with A. C. Saunders in Summerside.

== Politics ==
Campbell first ran for a seat in the Legislative Assembly of Prince Edward Island in a 1930 by-election as the Liberal candidate in 2nd Prince but lost. In 1930, he was appointed Attorney General of Prince Edward Island. He was elected for 1st Prince in 1931 and re-elected in 1935 and was appointed Attorney and Advocate General in Premier Walter Lea's cabinet.

When Premier Lea died in 1936, Campbell succeeded him. Campbell's government organised the provincial police, passed the province's first law governing the public service and established a national park. With the beginning of World War II, Campbell's government committed itself to organising the province for the war effort.

== Judicial career ==
In 1943, Campbell left politics to become Chief Justice on the island's Supreme Court and, in 1970, became head of the Foreign Claims Commission. While Chief Justice he saw his son, Alexander B. Campbell, sworn in as premier in 1966.

== Curling ==
A curler, he joined the Summerside Curling Club in 1928. He was President of the PEI Curling Association in 1936. He served as President of the Dominion Curling Association from 1941 to 1942. In 2007, he was posthumously inducted into the Prince Edward Island Curling Hall of Fame and Museum. In 1974, he was inducted into the Canadian Curling Hall of Fame in the builder category.

== Honours ==
In 1973 he was made a Companion of the Order of Canada.

== Family life ==
He married Cecilia Bradshaw (1906–1968) on 28 February 1930. They had four children: Virginia; Alex; Harriet; and J. Melville.
