= Matthew W. Wood =

Canadian politician

Matthew Worland Wood (March 2, 1879 – May 10, 1969) was a farmer and political figure on Prince Edward Island. He represented 3rd Queens in the Legislative Assembly of Prince Edward Island from 1932 to 1935 as a Conservative.

He was born in Mount Herbert, Prince Edward Island, the son of Robert Wood. Wood was a cattle dealer and was also one of the earliest fox ranchers on the island. He was married twice: to Ethel Catherine Wood in 1902 and then later to Maude MacPherson after his first wife's death. Wood served in the province's Executive Council as a minister without portfolio. He ran unsuccessfully for reelection to the provincial assembly in 1935, 1939, 1943, 1947 and 1951. Wood died at a nursing home in Charlottetown at the age of 90. He had two daughters and one son who died as an infant.
