= Leonard Wood (Prince Edward Island politician) =

Canadian politician (1865–1957)

Leonard J. Wood (July 27, 1865 – April 13, 1957) was a Canadian farmer, trader, and political figure from Prince Edward Island. He represented 3rd Queens in the Legislative Assembly of Prince Edward Island from 1904 to 1908, from 1916 to 1919 and from 1924 to 1927 as a Conservative.

== Biography ==
He was born on July 27, 1865, in Mount Herbert, Prince Edward Island, to Leonard Wood and Margaret Irving. In 1889, he married Jessie May Stewart. Wood lived in Hopeton. He was defeated when he ran for reelection in 1919. He served in the province's Executive Council as a minister without portfolio. He died on April 13, 1957, aged 91.
