= John Howatt Bell =

Canadian politician (1846–1929)

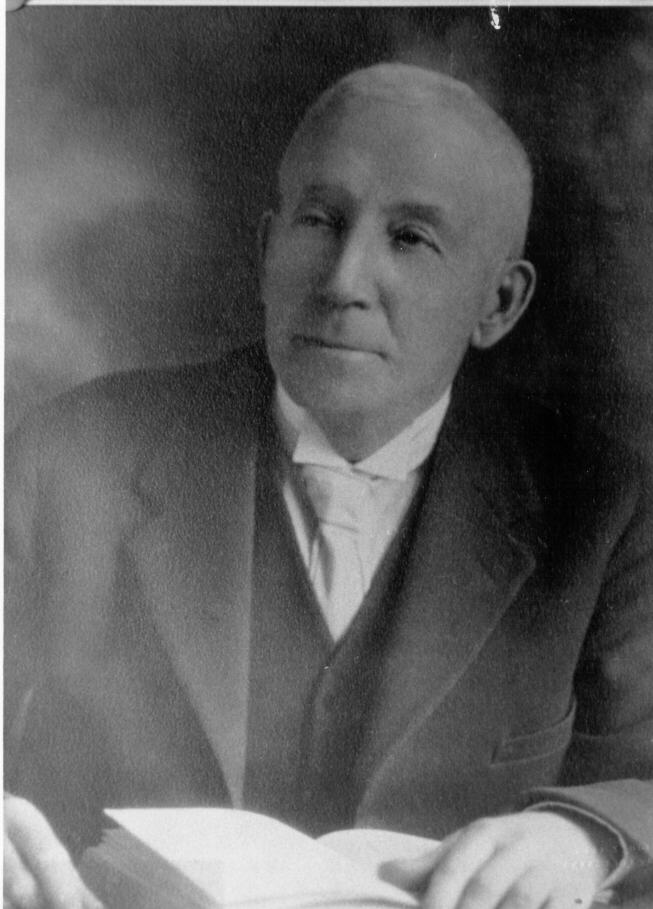

14th Premier of Prince Edward Island
- In office 9 September 1919 – 5 September 1923
- Monarch: George V
- Lieutenant Governor: Murdoch McKinnon
- Preceded by: Aubin-Edmond Arsenault
- Succeeded by: James D. Stewart

Leader of the Prince Edward Island Liberal Party
- In office 13 July 1915 – 26 July 1923
- Preceded by: John Richards
- Succeeded by: Albert Charles Saunders

Member of the General Assembly of Prince Edward Island for 4th Prince
- In office 30 June 1886 – 13 December 1893 Serving with George W. Bentley
- Preceded by: Augustus Holland
- Succeeded by: district abolished

MLA (Assemblyman) for 4th Prince
- In office 13 December 1893 – 14 May 1898
- Preceded by: himself
- Succeeded by: Samuel E. Reid
- In office 16 September 1915 – 26 July 1923
- Preceded by: James Kennedy
- Succeeded by: Whitefield Bentley

Member of Parliament for East Prince
- In office 14 December 1898 – 7 November 1900
- Preceded by: John Yeo
- Succeeded by: Alfred Lefurgey

Personal details
- Born: 13 December 1846 Cape Traverse, Prince Edward Island Colony
- Died: 29 January 1929 (aged 82) Los Angeles, California
- Party: Prince Edward Island Liberal Party
- Other political affiliations: Liberal
- Spouse: Helen Howatt (m. 1882)
- Education: Prince of Wales College; Albert College
- Occupation: Teacher and lawyer
- Profession: Politician

John Howatt Bell (13 December 1846 – 29 January 1929) was a lawyer and politician who served as the 14th premier of Prince Edward Island.

Bell was born in Cape Traverse, the son of Walter Bell and Elizabeth Howatt. He was educated at Prince of Wales College and at Albert College in Belleville. After studying law, he was called to the Ontario bar in 1874 and set up practice in Ottawa, Ontario. He moved to Manitoba, was called to the bar there and set up practice in Emerson. In 1882, he married his first cousin, Helen, the daughter of Cornelius Howatt. He returned to Prince Edward Island, was called to the bar, and set up practice in Summerside.

Bell entered politics in 1886 when he was elected to the province's legislative assembly as a Liberal. In 1898 he won a seat in the House of Commons of Canada as a supporter of the federal Liberals under Sir Wilfrid Laurier. He lost his seat in 1900 but returned to the provincial assembly in 1915 when he was chosen to lead the Liberal Party and became leader of the opposition. After Bell led the Liberals to power in 1919, he became Premier. His government extended the province's road system and adopted a highway improvement policy funded by a tax that contributed to the government's unpopularity. His administration also extended the voting franchise to women in 1922.

Bell's government was ridden with disputes within his cabinet, which harmed the party's unity and popularity and led to his government's electoral defeat in 1923 after a single term in office. Bell retired from politics and died six years later in a car accident in Los Angeles, California.
