= Charles Dalton =

Canadian businessman, politician and philanthropist

The Honourable Charles Dalton
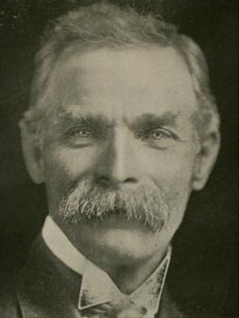

13th Lieutenant Governor of Prince Edward Island
- In office November 26, 1930 – December 9, 1933
- Monarch: George V
- Governors General: The Earl of Willingdon; The Earl of Bessborough
- Premier: Walter Lea; James D. Stewart; William J. P. MacMillan
- Preceded by: Frank Richard Heartz
- Succeeded by: George Des Brisay de Blois

MLA (Councillor) for 1st Prince
- In office January 3, 1912 – July 24, 1919
- Preceded by: John Agnew
- Succeeded by: Christopher Metherall

Personal details
- Born: June 9, 1850 Tignish, Prince Edward Island Colony
- Died: December 9, 1933 (aged 83) Charlottetown, Prince Edward Island, Canada
- Party: Conservative
- Spouse: Annie Gavin (m. 1874)
- Children: C. Howard M.D., Freda, Nora, Julia P., Florence, Edith, Irene, Gerald, Zita, Joseph Arnold, Catherine, and Mary B.
- Occupation: Businessman, philanthropist, druggist, farmer, and fox breeder
- Profession: Politician
- Cabinet: Minister without Portfolio (1915-1919)

Charles Dalton (June 9, 1850 – December 9, 1933) was a Canadian businessman, politician and philanthropist on Prince Edward Island.

== Biography ==
Charles Dalton was born at Tignish, Prince Edward Island, the son of Patrick Dalton and Margaret McCarthy. He first worked as a farmer and then as a druggist. He married Anne Gavin in 1874.

Dalton earned his fortune through silver fox breeding, in the process making the island the centre of the world's trade in the fur-bearing animal. He used his fortune to purchase The Guardian newspaper in Charlottetown. He served as a Conservative provincial cabinet minister and then the 13th Lieutenant Governor of Prince Edward Island from 1930 until his death in 1933.

During World War I, he donated a motor ambulance to the Canadian government. He also built a school in his home town of Tignish. In 1916, he was named a Knight Commander in the Order of St. Gregory the Great.

Dalton became devoted to the fight against tuberculosis after losing a daughter to the disease, donating funds to allow for the construction of a sanatorium on the island which was named in his honour.
