= Peter MacIsaac =

Canadian politician

Peter A. MacIsaac (February 10, 1878 – January 9, 1969) was a dairy farmer and political figure on Prince Edward Island. He represented 1st Kings in the Legislative Assembly of Prince Edward Island from 1935 to 1943 as a Liberal.

He was born in Souris, Prince Edward Island, the son of Donald A. MacIsaac and Annie Ford. MacIsaac was a lieutenant in a Canadian artillery unit from 1898 to 1902. In 1910, he married Mary Josephine McInnis. He was an unsuccessful candidate for a seat in the provincial assembly in 1931 and was defeated when he ran for reelection in 1943. MacIsaac died in the Souris Hospital at the age of 90.
