= 1947 Prince Edward Island general election =

Canadian provincial election

← 1943	December 11, 1947	1951 →

All 30 seats in the Legislative Assembly of Prince Edward Island 16 seats needed for a majority
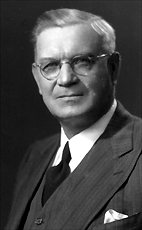

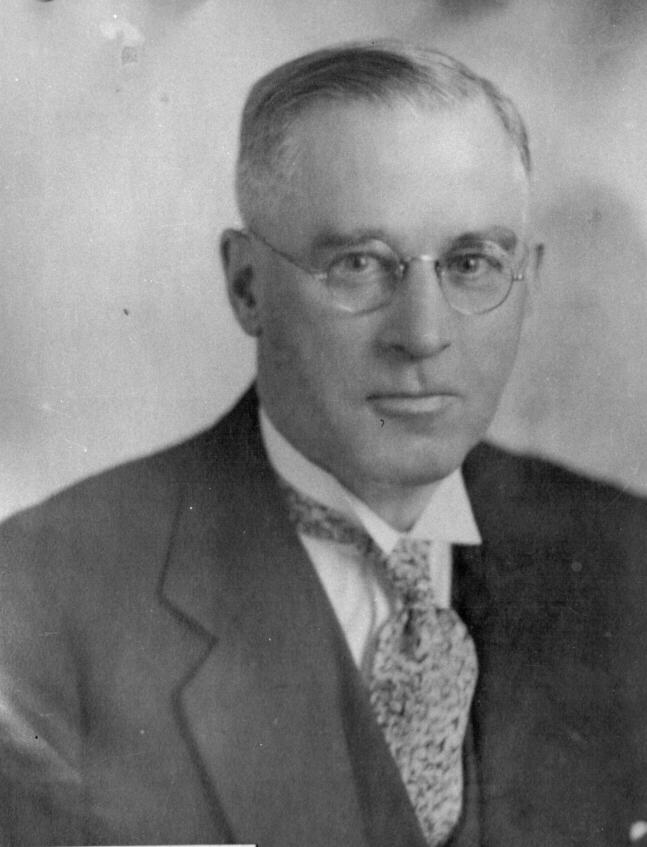
	First party	Second party
Leader	J. Walter Jones	William J. P. MacMillan
Party	Liberal	Progressive Conservative
Leader since	1943	1933
Leader's seat	4th Queens	5th Queens
Last election	20 seats, 51.3%	10 seats, 46.1%
Seats won	24	6
Seat change	▲4	▼4
Popular vote	40,758	36,661
Percentage	50.3%	45.3%
Swing	▼1.0pp	▼0.8pp
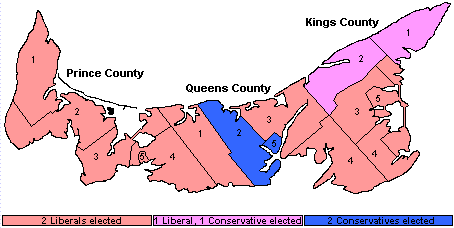
- Map of PEI's ridings coloured in based on how they voted
Premier before election
J. Walter Jones
Liberal
Premier after election
J. Walter Jones
Liberal

The 1947 Prince Edward Island general election was held in the Canadian province of Prince Edward Island on December 11, 1947.

The governing Liberals of Premier J. Walter Jones were able to increase their majority in the Legislature over the opposition Progressive Conservatives, led by former Premier William J.P. MacMillan. This would be MacMillan's last election as PC leader.

The democratic socialist Co-operative Commonwealth Federation increased their share of the vote marginally, but were unable to capture any seats. Cyrus Gallant, the CCF's candidate for Assemblyman in 3rd Prince, made history as the first third-party candidate to place second in an electoral contest over one of the two major party candidates.

== Party Standings ==
↓
24	6
Liberal	PC

Party	Party Leader	Seats			Popular Vote		
Party	Party Leader	1943	Elected	Change	#	%	Change
Liberal	J. Walter Jones	20	24	+4	40,758	50.3%	-1.0%
Progressive Conservative	William J. P. MacMillan	10	6	-4	36,661	45.3%	-0.8%
Co-operative Commonwealth		-	-	-	3,509	4.3%	+2.2%
Independent		-	-	-	89	0.1%	+0.1%

Popular vote
Liberal	50.31%
PC	42.25%
CCF	4.33%
Others	0.11%

Seats summary
Liberal	80.00%
PC	20.00%

== Members Elected ==
The Legislature of Prince Edward Island had two levels of membership from 1893 to 1996 - Assemblymen and Councillors. This was a holdover from when the Island had a bicameral legislature, the General Assembly and the Legislative Council.

In 1893, the Legislative Council was abolished and had its membership merged with the Assembly, though the two titles remained separate and were elected by different electoral franchises. Assembleymen were elected by all eligible voters of within a district, while Councillors were only elected by landowners within a district.

=== Kings ===
District	Assemblyman	Party	Councillor	Party
1st Kings	John R. McLean	Progressive; Conservative	T. J. Kickham	Liberal
2nd Kings	Harry Cox	Liberal	Lou Burge	Progressive; Conservative
3rd Kings	Joseph G. Campbell	Liberal	Keir Clark	Liberal
4th Kings	John A. Campbell	Liberal	Alexander Wallace Matheson	Liberal
5th Kings	William Hughes	Liberal	George Saville	Liberal

=== Queens ===
District	Assemblyman	Party	Councillor	Party
1st Queens	Frederic Large	Liberal	W. F. Alan Stewart	Liberal
2nd Queens	Philip Matheson	Progressive; Conservative	Reginald Bell	Progressive; Conservative
3rd Queens	Russell C. Clark	Liberal	Eugene Cullen	Liberal
4th Queens	Dougald MacKinnon	Liberal	John Walter Jones	Liberal
5th Queens	David L. Matheson	Progressive; Conservative	William J. P. MacMillan	Progressive; Conservative

=== Prince ===
District	Assemblyman	Party	Councillor	Party
1st Prince	Hector Richard	Liberal	Fred Ramsay	Liberal
2nd Prince	George H. Barbour	Liberal	Forrest Phillips	Liberal
3rd Prince	J. Wilfred Arsenault	Liberal	Thomas Linkletter	Liberal
4th Prince	Cleveland Baker	Liberal	Horace Wright	Liberal
5th Prince	Carrol Delaney	Liberal	Lorne H. MacFarlane	Liberal
