= William J. P. MacMillan =

Canadian politician (1881–1957)

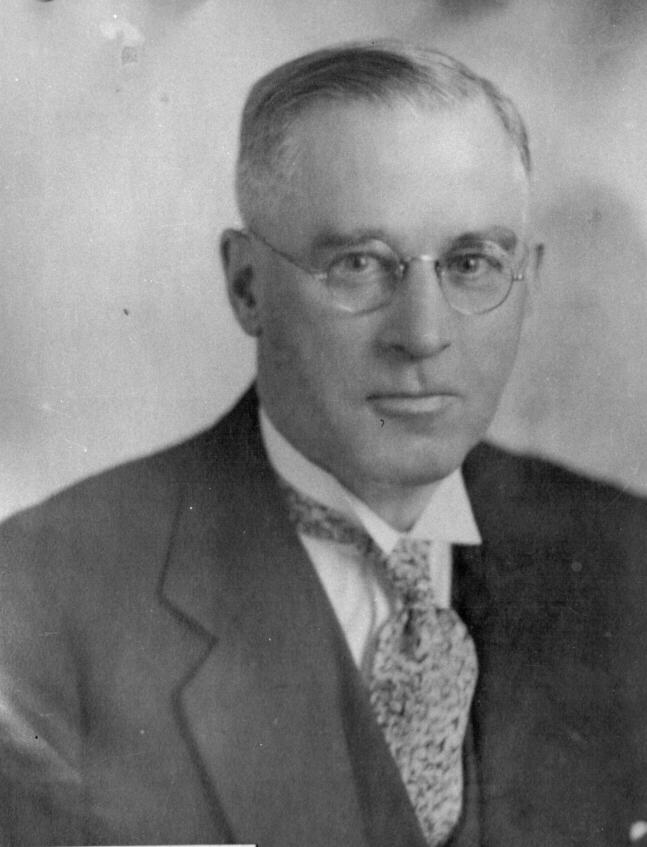

18th Premier of Prince Edward Island
- In office October 14, 1933 – August 15, 1935
- Monarch: George V
- Lieutenant Governor: Charles Dalton; George DesBrisay DeBlois
- Preceded by: James D. Stewart
- Succeeded by: Walter Lea

Leader of the Conservative/Progressive Conservative of Prince Edward Island
- In office October 14, 1933 – June 26, 1950
- Preceded by: James D. Stewart
- Succeeded by: Reginald Bell

MLA (Councillor) for 5th Queens
- In office July 26, 1923 – July 23, 1935
- Preceded by: Gavan Duffy
- Succeeded by: C. St. Clair Trainor
- In office May 18, 1939 – May 25, 1955
- Preceded by: C. St. Clair Trainor
- Succeeded by: Alex MacIsaac

Personal details
- Born: William Joseph Parnell MacMillan; March 24, 1881 Clermont, Prince Edward Island
- Died: December 7, 1957 (aged 76) Charlottetown, Prince Edward Island
- Party: Conservative/Progressive Conservative
- Spouses: Mary B. Macdonald (m. 1909) Letitia Macdonald (nee Roberts (m. 1922)
- Children: 6
- Education: Prince of Wales College; McGill University
- Occupation: physician and surgeon
- Profession: Politician
- Cabinet: Minister without Portfolio (1923–1927); Minister of Education (1931–1933); Minister of Public Health (1931–1935); Provincial Secretary-Treasurer (1933–1935)

William Joseph Parnell MacMillan (March 24, 1881 – December 7, 1957) was a physician and Prince Edward Island politician.

== Life and career ==
Born in Clermont, MacMillan was a graduate of Prince of Wales College and the McGill University Faculty of Medicine.

After running a medical practice for several years, MacMillan entered politics in 1923 winning a seat in the provincial legislative assembly as a Conservative. In 1932 he became the province's first minister of health and education. As minister he rebuilt Prince of Wales College and the Provincial Mental Hospital which had both been destroyed by fire. He also secured a Carnegie Foundation endowment that enabled the government to establish a provincial library system.

When Premier James D. Stewart became ill, MacMillan served as acting premier and then became the 18th premier of Prince Edward Island when Stewart died in 1933. MacMillan's government implemented relief programs and increasing government spending to help dampen the impact of the Great Depression. Nevertheless, his government was swept from power in the 1935 election which saw the Liberals capture every seat in the legislature. He returned to the legislature in 1939 and remained leader of the Conservative Party until the late 1940s and a member of the legislature until he lost his seat in the 1955 election.

MacMillan was named the province's lieutenant governor on November 22, 1957 but died before being sworn in.
