= Whitefield Bentley =

Canadian politician

Thomas Whitefield Bentley (July 5, 1884 – June 12, 1952) was a life insurance company manager and political figure on Prince Edward Island. He represented 4th Prince in the Legislative Assembly of Prince Edward Island from 1924 to 1927 as a Conservative.

He was the son of George Bentley and Emma Jane Dennis. Bentley married Linda Irene Moore. He lived in Kensington. He was a branch manager for the Maritime Life Assurance Company; after he retired in 1952, he was rehired by the company as provincial supervisor. He died at the Prince Edward Island Hospital in Charlottetown at the age of 67.
