= 1882 Prince Edward Island general election =

Canadian provincial election

The 1882 Prince Edward Island election was held on May 8, 1882, to elect members of the House of Assembly of the province of Prince Edward Island, Canada. It was won by the Conservative Party.

The election is currently listed on the website of Elections Prince Edward Island as taking place in 1883 — however, contemporaneous sources place the election in 1882.

== Results ==
Party	Leader	1879	Seats won	% change	Popular vote	(%)
Conservative	William Wilfred Sullivan	24	21	-14%		
Liberal	Vacant	6	9	+33%		
Totals		30	30			
