= 1890 Prince Edward Island general election =

Canadian provincial election

The 1890 Prince Edward Island election was held on 10 August 1890 to elect members of the House of Assembly of the province of Prince Edward Island, Canada. This was the only election to produce a minority government for Prince Edward Island, until 2019. In many other elections such as 2019, a party won a majority of the seats without receiving a majority of the vote.

Party	Leader	1886	Seats won	% change	Popular vote	(%)
Conservative	Neil McLeod	18	15	-17%		
Liberal		12	15	+25%		
Totals		30	30			
