= David McDonald (Prince Edward Island politician) =

Canadian politician (1862–1939)

Donald David McDonald (March 13, 1862 – June 1939) was a farmer and political figure in Prince Edward Island. He represented 3rd Queens in the Legislative Assembly of Prince Edward Island from 1916 to 1923 and from 1928 to 1931 as a Liberal.

He was the son of Donald A. McDonald and was educated in Glenfinnan, Prince Edward Island. He was married twice: to Mary J. McIntyre in 1894 and to Mary McDonald in 1924. McDonald served as census commissioner for Queens County in 1901 and 1911. He also served as a justice of the peace. McDonald was defeated when he ran for a seat in the provincial assembly in 1912 and when he ran for reelection in 1923. He served in the province's Executive Council as a minister without portfolio. McDonald was speaker for the legislative assembly from 1928 to 1931. He died in Glenfinnan at the age of 77.
