= Charles Gavan Duffy (Canadian politician) =

Canadian politician (1874–1958)

Charles Gavan Duffy (November 2, 1874 – March 14, 1958) was a lawyer, judge and political figure on Prince Edward Island. He represented 5th Queens in the Legislative Assembly of Prince Edward Island from 1920 to 1923 as a Liberal and served as Speaker of the Legislative Assembly of Prince Edward Island.

He was born in Kinkora, Prince Edward Island, the son of James Duffy and Elizabeth Smith. After completing high school in 1891, Duffy attended Prince of Wales College and earned his teaching licence. After teaching school in Tracadie and Tignish, Duffy returned to school, attending Saint Dunstan's College. Duffy articled with Walter Morson and was called to the bar in 1903. The firm later came to be known as Morson and Duffy. Duffy was named King's Counsel in 1921.

Duffy was an unsuccessful candidate for a seat in the provincial assembly in 1915. He ran again, successfully, in the 1919 provincial election. He served as speaker from 1920 to 1923. Duffy ran unsuccessfully for reelection in 1923 and 1927.

On February 25, 1930, Duffy was appointed as a judge of the Prince Edward Island County Court, sitting in Queens County. Duffy retired from the court on November 2, 1949.

In 1906, he married Ethel Mary Eden. A Roman Catholic, Duffy was a member of the Knights of Columbus, at one time holding the post of Grand Master. Duffy died in Charlottetown on March 14, 1958. His grandson is Canadian former senator and former journalist Mike Duffy.
