= 1893 Prince Edward Island general election =

Canadian provincial election

The 1893 Prince Edward Island general election was held in the Canadian Province of Prince Edward Island on 13 December 1893 to elect members of the newly amalgamated Legislative Assembly. This was the first general election of Prince Edward Island won by the Liberal Party.

Each district elected two members. One of the two members from each constituency was styled a Councillor, and the other an Assemblyman. Assemblymen were elected by all resident males over the age of 21. Councillors were elected by property-owners.

In electoral contests Councillor candidates ran against Councillor candidates; Assemblyman candidates against Assemblyman candidates.

Prince Edward Island general election, 1893
| Name | Seats |
|---|---|
| Prince Edward Island Liberal Party | 23 |
| Prince Edward Island Conservative Party | 7 |
