= James David Stewart =

Canadian politician

James David Stewart KC
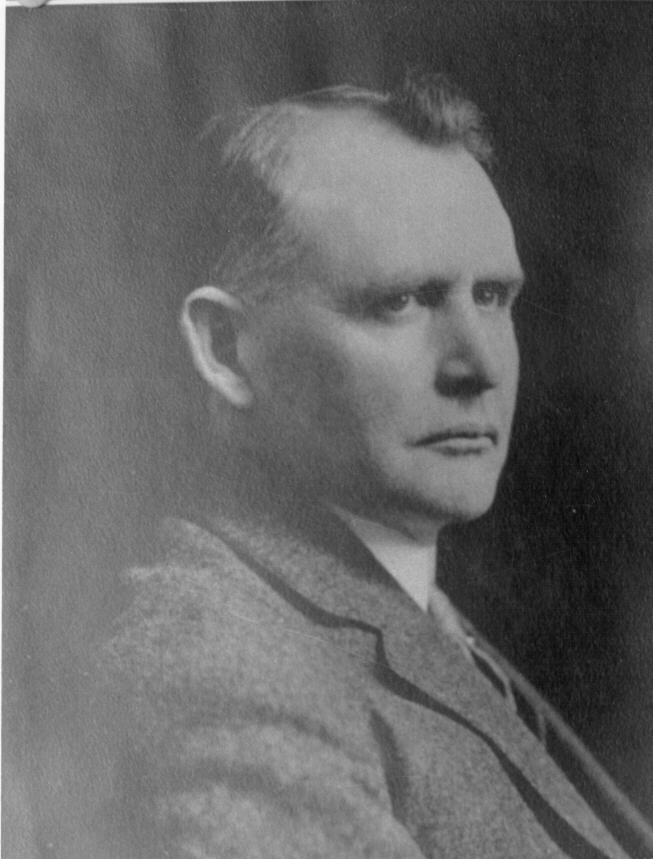

15th Premier of Prince Edward Island
- In office September 5, 1923 – August 21, 1927
- Monarch: George V
- Lieutenant Governor: Murdoch McKinnon; Frank Richard Heartz
- Preceded by: John Howatt Bell
- Succeeded by: Albert C. Saunders
- In office August 29, 1931 – October 10, 1933
- Monarch: George V
- Lieutenant Governor: Charles Dalton
- Preceded by: Walter Lea
- Succeeded by: William J. P. MacMillan

Leader of the Conservative Party of Prince Edward Island
- In office May 1, 1921 – October 10, 1933
- Preceded by: Aubin-Edmond Arsenault
- Succeeded by: William J. P. MacMillan

MLA (Councillor) for 5th Kings
- In office July 25, 1917 – October 10, 1933
- Preceded by: John A. Mathieson
- Succeeded by: George Saville

Personal details
- Born: January 15, 1874 Lower Montague, Prince Edward Island
- Died: October 10, 1933 (aged 59) Charlottetown, Prince Edward Island
- Party: Conservative
- Spouse: Barbara Alice MacDonald Westaway
- Children: 7, including J. David Stewart
- Education: Prince of Wales College; Dalhousie University
- Occupation: lawyer
- Profession: Politician
- Cabinet: Attorney General (1923–1927) (1931–1933)

James David Stewart (January 15, 1874 – October 10, 1933) was a Prince Edward Island educator, lawyer and politician, the province's 15th premier.

Born in Lower Montague and educated at Prince of Wales College and Dalhousie University, he taught school in Georgetown for several years before entering the legal profession.

In 1917, the Conservative Party recruited Stewart, then a young lawyer, to be the party's candidate in a by-election in King's County. Stewart won the vote and took his seat in the provincial legislative assembly.

In 1921 he was elected leader of the Conservative Party and led the party to victory in the 1923 election but his government was defeated in the 1927 election due to Stewart's opposition to total prohibition of alcohol.

He remained party leader and defeated the Liberal government in the 1931 election thanks, in part, to the difficulty all incumbent governments had in dealing with the Great Depression.

Stewart took on several cabinet positions himself and also intensively lobbied the federal government for relief so the province could deal with the economic hardships Prince Edward Islanders were suffering during the Depression. He obtained a larger federal subsidy for the island but the workload had a toll on Stewart and he died in office in 1933 at the age of 59.
