= Walter Lea =

Canadian politician (1874–1936)

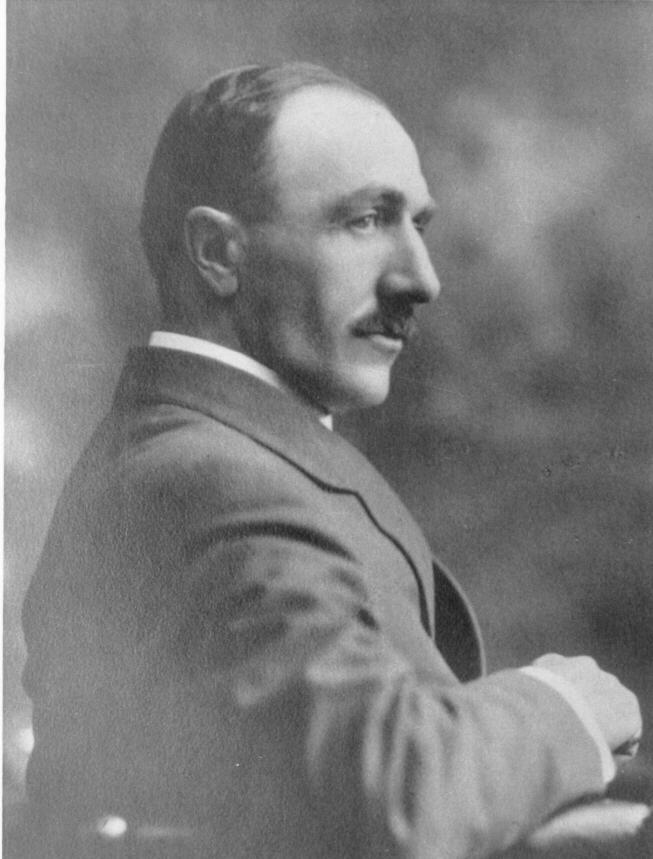

17th Premier of Prince Edward Island
- In office May 20, 1930 – August 29, 1931
- Monarch: George V
- Lieutenant Governor: Frank Richard Heartz; Charles Dalton
- Preceded by: Albert C. Saunders
- Succeeded by: James D. Stewart
- In office August 15, 1935 – January 10, 1936
- Monarch: George V
- Lieutenant Governor: George DesBrisay DeBlois
- Preceded by: William J. P. MacMillan
- Succeeded by: Thane A. Campbell

Leader of the Prince Edward Island Liberal Party
- In office May 20, 1930 – January 10, 1936
- Preceded by: Albert C. Saunders
- Succeeded by: Thane Campbell

MLA (Councillor) for 4th Prince
- In office September 16, 1915 – July 26, 1923
- Preceded by: Michael C. Delaney
- Succeeded by: John H. Myers
- In office June 25, 1927 – January 10, 1936
- Preceded by: John H. Myers
- Succeeded by: Horace Wright

Personal details
- Born: February 10, 1874 Tryon, Prince Edward Island
- Died: January 10, 1936 (aged 61) Charlottetown, Prince Edward Island
- Party: Liberal
- Spouse: Helena Esma Maude Mary Rogerson (m. 1899)
- Relations: William C. Lea (father)
- Children: 5
- Occupation: Farmer and livestock breeder
- Profession: Politician
- Cabinet: Minister of Agriculture (1919–1923); Commissioner of Agriculture and Provincial Secretary-General (1927–1930)

Walter Maxfield Lea (February 10, 1874 – January 10, 1936) was a Prince Edward Island politician.

A farmer and livestock breeder by profession, Lea was born in Tryon, the son of William C. Lea and Annie Murphy. He was elected to the provincial House of Assembly in 1915 as a Liberal and became commissioner of agriculture in 1919. In 1930 Lea became premier when his predecessor was appointed to the Supreme Court of Prince Edward Island but the Great Depression took a toll on the government's popularity and he lost the election the next year to the rival Conservative Party of Prince Edward Island.

Lea rebuilt the party while in opposition and in 1935 the Liberals won all 30 seats in the legislature, the first time such a thing had ever happened in the British Empire. Lea had been ill during the campaign, however, and died in office at the Prince Edward Island Hospital in Charlottetown on January 10, 1936.

He married Helena Esma Maude Mary Rodgerson in 1899. His daughter Marion married Walter Fitz-Alan Stewart.
