= Order of precedence in Prince Edward Island =

Relative preeminence of officials for ceremonial purposes

The Prince Edward Island order of precedence is a nominal and symbolic hierarchy of important positions within the province of Prince Edward Island. It has no legal standing but is used to dictate ceremonial protocol at events of a provincial nature.

1. The King in Right of Prince Edward Island (His Majesty Charles III)
2. The Lieutenant Governor of Prince Edward Island, or, in his official absence, the Administrator (Wassim Salamoun)
3. The Premier of Prince Edward Island (Rob Lantz)
4. The mayor or other elected senior official of an incorporated municipality when the ceremony or event is hosted by or particularly involves that municipality
5. The Chief Justice of Prince Edward Island
6. The Speaker of the Legislative Assembly of Prince Edward Island (Brad Trivers)
7. Former lieutenant governors, with relative precedence governed by their date of leaving office
8. Former premiers, with relative precedence governed by their date of leaving office
9. Members of the Executive Council of Prince Edward Island
10. The Chief Justice of the Supreme Court of Prince Edward Island
11. Justices of the Supreme Court of Prince Edward Island, with relative precedence governed by date of appointment
12. The Chief Judge of the Provincial Court of Prince Edward Island
13. Judges of the Provincial Court of Prince Edward Island, with relative precedence governed by date of appointment
14. Members of the Legislative Assembly of Prince Edward Island
  - Leader of the Opposition
  - Deputy Speaker
  - Government House Leader
  - Opposition House Leader
  - Thereafter by date of first election, and if concurrent, then alphabetically)
15. Members of the Senate of Canada (by date of appointment)
16. Members of the House of Commons of Canada (members of the Federal Cabinet, then by date of first election, and if coincident, alphabetically)
17. Mayors or other elected senior officials of incorporated municipalities outside their municipality, alphabetically by municipality name
18. The Bishop of Charlottetown, the Bishop of Nova Scotia and the President of the Queens County Ministerial Association, with relative precedence governed by date of appointment or election
19. The Senior Officer for the Royal Canadian Mounted Police in Prince Edward Island
20. The President of the University of Prince Edward Island
21. Deputy heads of departments, agencies, commissions and offices of the Provincial Government, with relative precedence governed by date of initial appointment as a Deputy Head
