= Frank Lewis (broadcaster) =

Canadian politician

The Honourable H. Frank Lewis CM OPEI
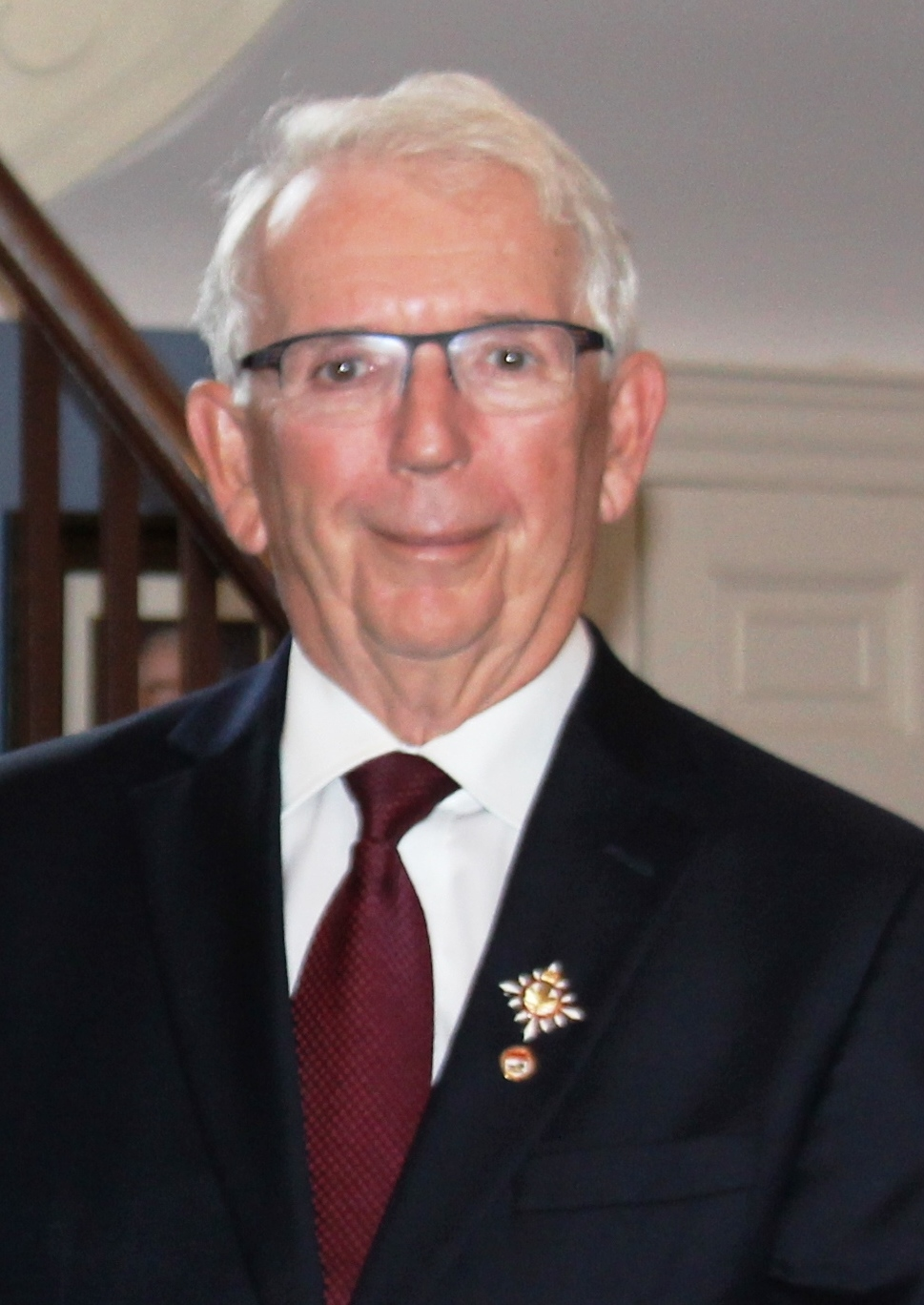
- Lewis in 2014

28th Lieutenant Governor of Prince Edward Island
- In office August 15, 2011 – October 20, 2017
- Monarch: Elizabeth II
- Governors General: David Johnston; Julie Payette
- Premier: Robert Ghiz; Wade MacLauchlan
- Preceded by: Barbara Oliver Hagerman
- Succeeded by: Antoinette Perry

Personal details
- Born: 1939 (age 86–87) York, Prince Edward Island, Canada
- Spouse: Dorothy

Harry Franklin Lewis, CM OPEI (born 1939) is a Canadian broadcaster and politician who served as the 28th lieutenant governor of Prince Edward Island, as viceregal representative of Queen Elizabeth II of Canada in the province of Prince Edward Island. He held the position from August 15, 2011, until October 20, 2017, and was succeeded by Antoinette Perry who was appointed on September 14, 2017.

Born in 1939 in York, Queens County, Prince Edward Island, Lewis started working at CFCY-FM in Charlottetown in 1966 and retired in 2004 when he was a vice president and General Manager. Since his retirement, he has worked as a senior advisor for Newcap Radio. He was appointed the 28th Lieutenant Governor of Prince Edward Island on July 28, 2011, by Governor General of Canada David Lloyd Johnston on the Constitutional advice of Prime Minister of Canada Stephen Harper. He was sworn in by David Jenkins, the Chief Justice of the Supreme Court of Prince Edward Island, on August 15, 2011, at Province House. As Lieutenant Governor, Lewis was Chancellor of the Order of Prince Edward Island.

In 2006 he was inducted into the Canadian Association of Broadcasters Hall of Fame.

== Arms ==
Coat of arms of Frank Lewis

Crest
On an island a radio mast between two horse chestnut saplings Proper its antenna emitting a signal Or.
Escutcheon
Azure three barrulets wavy Argent between in chief two hands clasped in fess between two millrinds and in base a speckled trout naiant Or.
Supporters
Two German shepherds proper each gorged of a collar Azure pendent therefrom a hurt charged with a chevron reversed Argent both standing on a grassy mount proper set with plates and roses Argent.
Motto
Salutemus Amicos Veteres Et Novos (Let Us Welcome Our Friends Old And New)
