= William Wilfred Sullivan =

Canadian politician

Sir William Wilfred Sullivan
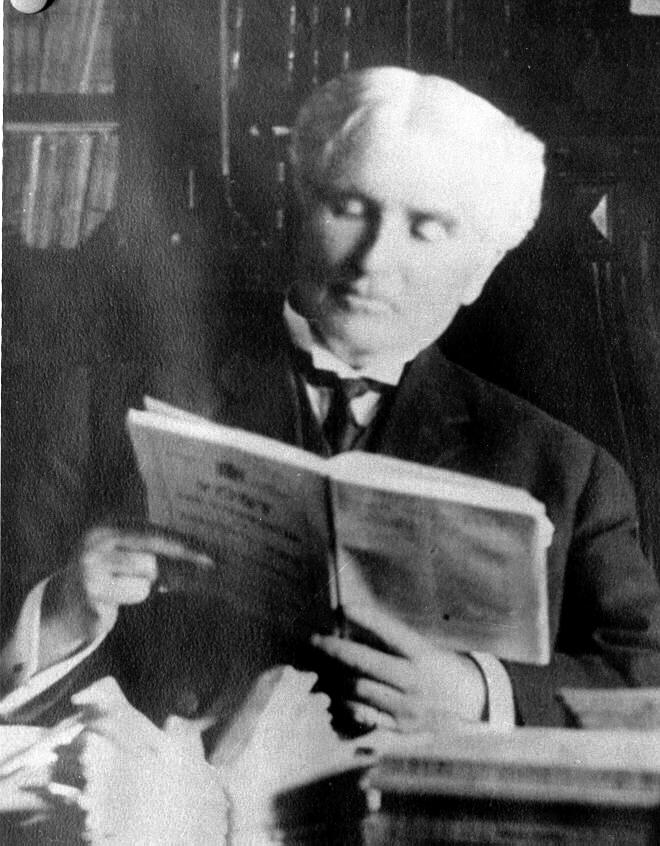

4th Premier of Prince Edward Island
- In office April 25, 1879 – November 13, 1889
- Monarch: Victoria
- Lieutenant Governor: Robert Hodgson; Thomas Heath Haviland; Andrew Archibald Macdonald; Jedediah Slason Carvell
- Preceded by: Louis Henry Davies
- Succeeded by: Neil McLeod

Leader of the Conservative Party of Prince Edward Island
- In office 1877 – November 13, 1889
- Preceded by: Lemuel Owen
- Succeeded by: Neil McLeod

Chief Justice of Prince Edward Island
- In office November 13, 1889 – June 21, 1917
- Preceded by: Edward Palmer
- Succeeded by: John Alexander Mathieson

Member of the General Assembly of Prince Edward Island for 2nd Kings
- In office 1872 – November 13, 1889 Serving with Hilary McIsaac, William Hooper, John Underhay
- Preceded by: none
- Succeeded by: John P. Sullivan

Administrator of Prince Edward Island
- In office February 14, 1894 – February 21, 1894
- Preceded by: Jedediah Slason Carvell
- Succeeded by: George William Howlan

Personal details
- Born: December 6, 1839 Hope River, Prince Edward Island Colony
- Died: September 30, 1920 (aged 80) Memramcook, New Brunswick, Canada
- Party: Conservative Party
- Spouse: Alice Maud Mary Newberry (m. 1872)
- Children: 6
- Education: University of Prince Edward Island; St. Dunstan's College
- Occupation: Journalist, lawyer, and judge
- Profession: Politician
- Cabinet: Solicitor General (1873–1876)

Sir William Wilfred Sullivan (December 6, 1839 – September 30, 1920) was a Prince Edward Island journalist, politician and jurist, the fourth premier of Prince Edward Island.

A native of Hope River, Sullivan had a career as an assistant editor at the Charlottetown Herald as well as a lawyer before being elected to the provincial legislature in 1872 as a Liberal MLA.

A staunch Catholic, Sullivan became leader of the opposition in 1877 to the Protestant coalition government of Louis Henry Davies which had been formed to implement a public, secular school system that denied funding to Roman Catholic separate schools. Sullivan reorganised the Conservative Party and was asked by the lieutenant governor to become premier once Davies' coalition broke up and became unable to command a majority in the assembly.

Sullivan served as premier for ten years and fought for PEI's rights in Canada. He protested the federal government's failure to fulfill the terms of Canadian Confederation on which the island had joined the dominion in 1873. In 1886, he petitioned the Imperial government in London protesting Canada's delinquency in respect to promises to ensure communication lines between the island and the rest of the country but the problem remained unresolved until the 1900s.

In 1889, Sullivan was appointed Chief Justice of PEI and served in that position until his retirement in 1917. In 1914 he was made a Knight Bachelor by King George V.
