= Flag of Prince Edward Island =

Prince Edward Island
- Use: Civil and state flag
- Proportion: 2:3
- Adopted: May 30, 1905 (royal warrant); March 24, 1964 (provincial statute)
- Design: A gold lion passant on a red upper field and three oak saplings and a large oak tree on a green island in the bottom white field, surrounded on three sides by a border of red and white rectangles.

The flag of Prince Edward Island consists of a golden lion passant on a red field in the upper portion and a white field charged with three oak saplings and a large oak tree on a green island in the bottom portion. This is bordered on three edges other than the hoist by a fimbriation of alternating red and white rectangles. Adopted in 1964 in the run-up to the Canadian Centennial, it has been the flag of the province since March 24 of that year. It is a banner of arms modelled after the province's coat of arms. When flown with the flags of other Canadian provinces and the national flag, it is eighth in the order of precedence.

== History ==
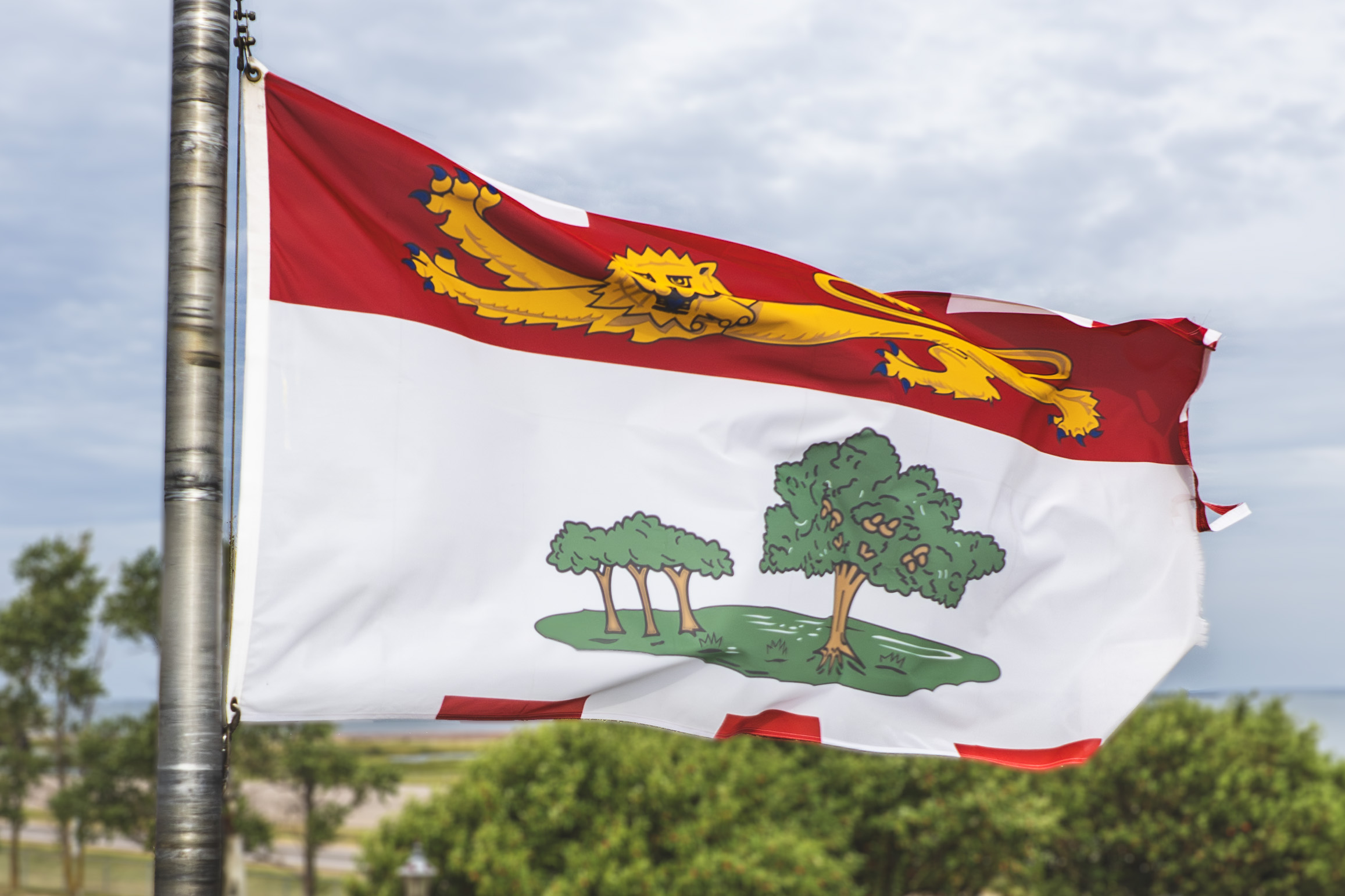
Flag of Prince Edward Island.

The French first settled in modern-day Prince Edward Island during the 1720s and named it Île Saint-Jean. The Treaty of Paris of 1763 saw France permanently relinquish the island to the United Kingdom. It was consequently placed under the administration of the Colony of Nova Scotia and its name was anglicized to St. John’s Island. The territory became a separate colony in 1769, and was accorded its own seal on July 14 of that same year. It featured an oak tree with three adjacent smaller trees. The island was renamed in 1799 to honour Prince Edward, Duke of Kent and Strathearn, who was the commander of the British forces in North America and garrisoned in nearby Halifax at the time.

Responsible government was accorded to Prince Edward Islanders in 1851. The territory hosted the Charlottetown Conference in 1864, which culminated in Canadian Confederation three years later on July 1, 1867, between the Province of Canada (consisting of modern-day Ontario and Quebec), Nova Scotia, and New Brunswick. Although the island was consequently dubbed the "Cradle of Confederation", it initially opted not to join due to lack of popular support. However, major economic troubles on the island led it to reconsider and eventually acquiesce to confederation. It officially joined the Dominion of Canada exactly six years later on July 1, 1873. Subsequently, King Edward VII issued a Royal Warrant on May 30, 1905, allowing Prince Edward Island to utilize their own coat of arms. The shield was derived from the Great Seal of 1769, with the addition of a gold lion on a red chief.

In the time leading up to the Canadian Centennial in 1967, Conrad Swan – the first Canadian to be appointed to the College of Arms in London – was invited to design a flag for Prince Edward Island. He created an armorial banner based on the province's coat of arms and included a fimbriation of alternating red and white rectangles on the outer three sides of the flag. The Act of Legislature that tabled this flag received royal assent on March 24, 1964.

In a 2001 online survey conducted by the North American Vexillological Association, Prince Edward Island's flag ranked within the top third of state, provincial and territorial flags from Canada, the United States, and select current and former territories of the United States. It finished in 21st place out of 72, and placed fifth among official Canadian flags after Quebec, Nova Scotia, Nunavut, and New Brunswick.

== Design ==
=== Description ===
The flag of Prince Edward Island is described in detail in the Provincial Flag Act, provincial legislation that has been in force from March 24, 1964. It specifies the flag is to have an aspect ratio of 2:3. (Note: The official proportions of the flag are "six feet in the fly and four feet in the hoist inclusive of the fringe or band". However, the figures are divided by their lowest common denominator of two.) The blazon for the arms – as outlined in the letters patent registering it with the Canadian Heraldic Authority (CHA) on July 15, 2011 – reads, "Argent on an island Vert, to the sinister an oak tree fructed, to the dexter thereof three oak saplings sprouting all proper, on a chief Gules a lion passant guardant Or". The flag itself was registered with the CHA on November 15, 2010. For a 4-by-6-foot (120 cm × 180 cm) flag, the fimbriation of alternating red and white bands consists of rectangles measuring 10 inches (25 cm) in length and 3 inches (7.6 cm) in height.

=== Design variations ===
Common variant flag with an incorrect 1:2 size

Variant flag

=== Symbolism ===
The Royal Arms of England (left) and the arms of Prince Edward, Duke of Kent and Strathearn (right) feature gold lions on red fields that inspired the same design on Prince Edward Island's flag.

The colours and symbols of the flag carry cultural, political, and regional meanings. According to vexillologist Whitney Smith, the gold lion in the upper part of the flag – corresponding to the one on the Royal Arms of England – alludes to the English heritage of the early colonists to Prince Edward Island. It also evokes the coat of arms of Prince Edward, Duke of Kent and Strathearn, who is the namesake of the island. The large oak tree on the right symbolizes England, while the three oak saplings on the left epitomize the three counties that constitute the province (namely Kings County, Queens County, and Prince County). The green island on which these trees are planted on represents Prince Edward Island and Great Britain, which are both islands. Taken altogether, the trees tie in with the province's motto of Parva sub ingenti ("the small under the protection of the great", from the second book of the Georgics by Virgil). The island was historically a small colony of the British Empire, as well as the smallest Canadian province by area. The three oak saplings are therefore interpreted in Complete Flags of the World by DK as the "descendants" of the British oak tree and are guarded by the British lion.

The oak tree on Prince Edward Island's coat of arms (and by extension, its flag) is surmised to be Quercus rubra (red oak). This was adopted as the provincial tree in 1987. However, it has not been officially identified as such with regard to the arms.

== Protocol ==
Advice regarding flag etiquette is the responsibility of the province's Office of Protocol, specifically the Chief of Protocol. When flown together with the flag of Canada and the other provincial and territorial flags, the flag of Prince Edward Island is eighth in the order of precedence (after the national flag and, in descending order of precedence, the flags of Ontario, Quebec, Nova Scotia, New Brunswick, Manitoba, and British Columbia). This is because it was the seventh province to enter into Confederation. Within Prince Edward Island, the provincial flag is third in the order of precedence, after the personal standard of a member of the Royal Family, the Governor General, or the province's Lieutenant Governor, as well as the national flag. Under section 3 of the Provincial Flag Act, the utilization of the flag in a way that is prohibited by the Lieutenant Governor-in-Council is a summary offence that is punishable by a maximum fine of C$50 for the first instance and a maximum of $500 for every offence thereafter.

In addition to the dates set out by the federal government for flying flags at half-mast, the provincial flag is half-masted upon the death of the Lieutenant Governor or premier (either an incumbent or a previous one), as well as the incumbent speaker of the legislative assembly, member of the executive council, and federal members of parliament (MPs) and senators who represent the province. It may also be flown in such a manner when an individual honoured by Prince Edward Island dies. The flag may be draped over the casket of an individual who was a member of the Canadian Armed Forces or who served in public office. When utilized in this situation, the flag should measure 4.5 feet (1.4 m) by 9 feet (2.7 m) and be placed with the canton covering the left end of the coffin.

The guidelines also state that the flag is not to touch the ground, nor should it be used to cover a table or seat. It ought to be hoisted at sunrise and lowered before sunset, unless the flag is illuminated by floodlight throughout the night. The provincial flag should not be flown on the same flagpole that displays another flag. The only exception to this is if the other flag is the banner of an organization, in which case it is to be flown underneath the flag of Prince Edward Island if individual flagpoles are not available. It is not to be employed at an unveiling ceremony to cover a statue, monument, or plaque, nor should it be situated between the ground tier and platform tier at the front of a stage.
