= Charles St. Clair Trainor =

Canadian politician (1901–1978)

Charles St. Clair Trainor (December 8, 1901 – June 19, 1978) was a lawyer, judge and political figure on Prince Edward Island. He represented 5th Queens in the Legislative Assembly of Prince Edward Island from 1935 to 1939 as a Liberal.

He was born in Albany, Prince Edward Island, the son of Thomas Trainor and Annie Greenan, and was educated at Saint Dunstan's College. Trainor articled in law with Mark MacGuigan and was called to the bar in 1927, entering practice with MacGuigan. In 1938, he was named King's Counsel. He was prosecutor for Queens County from 1939 to 1942.

He was an unsuccessful candidate for a seat in the provincial assembly in 1931 and was defeated when he ran for reelection in 1939.

Trainor was judge in the Kings County court from 1942 to 1949 and in the Queens County court from 1949 to 1967. In 1967, he was named to the Supreme Court of Prince Edward Island and became its chief justice in 1970.

He also served on the board of governors for Saint Dunstan's University and was chair of the board of governors for the University of Prince Edward Island. He was a member of the Charlottetown School Board from 1956 to 1968. He helped found the provincial polio association and was chairman of the Canadian National Institute for the Blind in the province.

Trainor was married twice: to Catherine Bernadette MacMillan, the daughter of William J. P. MacMillan, in 1938 and to Annie Maud MacGuigan in 1968. Judge Trainor and Bernadette MacMillan (Trainor) were parents of: Elaine, Charles and Leo.
