= Harry Cox (politician) =

Canadian politician

Harry Howard Cox (June 1874 – 1950) was a farmer, merchant and political figure on Prince Edward Island. He represented 2nd Kings in the Legislative Assembly of Prince Edward Island from 1928 to 1950 as a Liberal.

He was the son of Julian Cox and Jane Ellen Jeffs. Cox was married three times: to Margaret Florence MacLaine in 1905, then to Lottie A. MacLaine and finally to Katherine M. Pratt. He worked for his uncle Robert Cox before opening his own business in Morell. Cox also owned a lobster factory and operated a farm near Morell. He ran unsuccessfully for a seat in the provincial assembly in 1923. He served in the province's Executive Council as a minister without portfolio from 1948 to 1950. Cox died in office in 1950.
