= Munson Jarvis =

Canadian politician

Munson Jarvis (October 11, 1742 – October 7, 1824) was a merchant and politician in New Brunswick. He represented Saint John County in the Legislative Assembly of New Brunswick from 1804 to 1809.

He was born in Stamford, Connecticut, the son of Samuel Jarvis and Martha Seymour, and was employed as a silversmiths at the start of the American Revolution. In 1770, he had married Mary Arnold. He was a loyalist, Jarvis fled to Long Island where he recruited for the British, later setting up business in New York City. Following the end of the war, he moved to New Brunswick, settling in Parrtown (later Saint John). Jarvis served as an alderman from 1785 to 1790. He operated a hardware store and also was involved in trade with England, the United States and the West Indies. His sons William and Ralph also later became involved in the family business. Jarvis was an unsuccessful candidate for a seat in the New Brunswick assembly in 1789. He was elected to the assembly in an 1804 by-election held after the election of Edward Sands was overturned. Jarvis died in Saint John at the age of 81.

His youngest son Edward James served as the first Chief Justice of Prince Edward Island.
