= Murder of Mary Tuplin =

1887 murder in Canada

Mary Tuplin
- Born: Mary Pickering Tuplin; May 5, 1870
- Died: June 28, 1887 (aged 17); Margate, Prince Edward Island, Canada
- Cause of death: Gunshot wounds (x2) to head
- Resting place: Margate Cemetery, Prince Edward Island, Canada; 46.45900°N 63.58961°W (approximate)
- Known for: Murder victim
- Parent(s): Johnny and Margaret (née Marks) Tuplin

Mary Pickering Tuplin (May 5, 1870 – June 28, 1887), was murdered in Margate, Prince Edward Island, Canada in 1887, her body found at the bottom of the Southwest River weighted by a heavy stone. Tuplin, who was 17, died of two shots to the head from a .32 caliber revolver. A medical examination also determined the girl was six months pregnant.

Tuplin's alleged lover, 19-year-old William Millman, was charged with the killing and was convicted, largely on circumstantial evidence. Though he professed innocence, Millman was hanged following a sensational trial held in Charlottetown early the next year.

The Murder of Mary Tuplin (Roud #12463) is one of several ballads written about the crime, which at the time shocked the entire country.

In 2016, Tuplin's skull was reunited with the rest of her remains in a burial arranged by descendants. The skull had been separated from the girl's body during the post-mortem examination and was stored for well over a century in what had once served as the coroner's office in Charlottetown.

== Background ==
Margate is an unincorporated village in a rural area of Prince Edward Island. The Tuplins and Millmans were farming families that lived on opposite sides of the Southwest River. Mary Pickering Tuplin was born on May 5, 1870, the daughter of Johnny and Margaret (Marks) Tuplin who had 10 children. William Millman was born in 1868. He was the eldest son of John and Johanna Millman, one of six children.

Mary and William met at a party on New Year's Eve, December 31, 1886, and it is believed he walked her home after the party ended around 3 a.m. Sometime later, Mary told one of her sisters that she was with child and that William was the father. Eventually, Mary's pregnancy and William's relationship with her became the subject of rumors in the close-knit Irish-Scottish community.

== Mary's disappearance and murder ==
Hearing the rumors, William arranged to see Mary on Sunday, June 26. Mary's younger brother John was gravely ill and died early the next morning. His funeral was held Tuesday the 28th, and Mary stayed home to tend her sister's baby. After her family returned from services, Mary left the house without a word. It was just after sundown, and she was wearing a light cotton dress, stockings and a pair of boots. It was the last Mary's parents would see her alive.

Concerned about his daughter's whereabouts, Mary's father went to look for her, stopping by a neighbor's house and calling for her in the night without success. The next day he visited the Millman home on the other side of the river to speak with William's parents. Tuplin also went to an attorney to inquire about having a warrant drawn up for William's arrest.

Word quickly spread about the girl's disappearance, and by Friday, a search party was mounted with at least a dozen men joining in. Two clues were uncovered that led searchers to focus on the Southwest River. A handkerchief of Mary's was found near the river bank, and a boat moored near the Millman property was missing a large stone that had served as an anchor. Using a grappling hook, the men began to drag the river. Finally, on Monday, July 4, they located Mary's body in 4–5 feet of water near a spring. Tied around her waist was the missing stone.

Three physicians were called to examine the body. They determined Mary had been shot twice in the head and also found she was six months pregnant. Learning of the body's discovery, William traveled to Charlottetown that day to speak with an attorney about the accusations by Mary's father. An investigation into Mary's death was launched and three days later, July 7, William was arrested.

During the arraignment, John Millman sought to provide an alibi for his son, unable to believe he could be involved in anything so terrible. While testifying he was with William around the time of the murder, the father fainted. After recovering, he admitted he and his wife had been at a church meeting the night of the girl's disappearance. William was sent to the county jail in Charlottetown to await trial.

== The trial ==
William Millman's Supreme Court trial for murder convened on January 24, 1888, with associate justice Joseph J. Hensley presiding and chief justice Edward Palmer and associate justice James Horsfield Peters present. After jury selection, attorney general Frederick Peters laid out the Crown's case. The prosecutor told the jury only two questions needed answers: Was Mary Tuplin murdered, and if so, who did the deed? Peters said the answer to the first question was obvious. Regarding the second, he said he would present evidence proving William Millman was the murderer.

The Crown called 48 witnesses to the stand over the course of the 11-day trial, which drew large crowds. Most evidence was beyond dispute. The medical examiner testified two bullets were recovered, one that flattened against Mary's skull and another that penetrated her brain causing her death. One of William's friends told the court the defendant had borrowed a .32 caliber revolver without any bullets the week before the murder and that he returned it two days after Mary's body was found with three bullets and two empty shells in its chambers. Another witness testified William had tried unsuccessfully to convince him to sign an affidavit attesting the two were together the night of June 28. A 13-year-old girl also said she had seen William crossing the river that night in a small boat. The boat's owner then told the court that the 80-pound rock tied to Mary's body had been kept in the bottom of his boat for use as an anchor.

While the evidence pointed to William, all of it was circumstantial. Testimony from witnesses also raised uncertainties. A stranger in dark clothing had been seen near the river before sundown, and only one of those who saw the man thought it was William. A few people recalled a wagon traveling at a high speed that night with two young men and a girl aboard, none of whom could be identified. Witnesses also confused the times connected with key events, such as Mary's disappearance, the church meeting they attended and two shots that were heard in the vicinity of the river.

After the prosecution rested, William's attorney, E.J. Hodgson, called just 18 witnesses. Perhaps the most damaging testimony came from William's family. His mother Johanna Millman told the court William was not at home when she had returned from the church meeting after 10 o'clock that night. She testified that a few minutes later, she saw him standing in the kitchen dressed in dark clothes. William's sister Mary Eliza shed additional light on his whereabouts testifying that while her parents were at the church meeting, William told her he was going down to the river to bathe.

In his closing remarks, attorney Hodgson emphasized the importance of reasonable doubt, that suspicions however strong are not sufficient to warrant conviction. Attorney general Peters countered these points, agreeing that guilt must be proved but noting that reasonable doubts should not be impossible ones. Further, Peters raised the argument that Millman was the only person with a motive for killing Mary Tuplin. The next day, February 4, justice Hansley helped bolster the prosecution's case in a detailed review of the evidence that lasted four hours and offered little to exonerate the defendant.

== The verdict and hanging ==
At 4 o'clock in the afternoon. after finishing his summary, justice Hensley sent the jury to its room to deliberate. The jurors took five hours to reach a decision. When the jury foreman announced a verdict of guilty, William fainted and was carried from the courtroom unconscious.

A few days later, on February 9, the crowds returned to the Charlottetown courthouse to learn Millman's fate. Justice Hensley rejected the jury's recommendation to spare the defendant's life, declaring Millman had shown no mercy for his young victim even though she had done him no harm. In pronouncing sentence, the judge ordered Millman be "kept in custody until Tuesday, the tenth day of the month of April...and that on that day, between the hours of eight o'clock in the forenoon and four o'clock in the afternoon, within the walls of the said prison, you be hanged by the neck until you are dead."

Millman was returned to his cell. In late March, he tried to escape, hitting a guard over the head with a bottle. Unable to find a way out of the jail yard, he was captured and placed in shackles until the day of his scheduled execution.

On April 10, a limited audience of 50 people was admitted to the prison yard to view the hanging. To avoid witnessing the scene, Millman asked to be blindfolded before being taken to the gallows. After the sheriff read the death warrant, the jailers strapped his legs together, final prayers were read, and a rope was placed around his neck. At 8:08 a.m., the door in the gallows floor dropped. Doctors recorded an intermittent pulse for the next 10 minutes, but at 8:19, Millman was pronounced dead.

The hanging was the last on Prince Edward Island in the 19th century. Another 53 years would pass before the next executions on the island, the very last, a double hanging in Charlottetown in 1941.

== Second burial of Mary Tuplin ==
During the post-mortem examination of Mary Tuplin on the shore of the Southwest River on July 4, 1887, the girl's head was detached from her body and was taken to Charlottetown as evidence. Mary's body was buried that night in the same cemetery plot in Margate where her younger brother had been laid to rest the week before. She reportedly had been buried without a ceremony, without a casket, and without her family present.

The story of Mary's death was passed down from generation to generation in the Tuplin family, including details of her burial. Well over a century later, after hearing the story, one of Mary's distant relatives set out to find what had happened to her skull. He learned that the coroner's office where Mary's head had been sent later became a pharmacy and was now being operated as a restaurant. By chance, someone found a well-labeled box stored in the building with Mary's skull still inside, and the box was turned over to her relative.

A burial re-uniting the skull with Mary's remains was held August 21, 2016. About 30 of her relatives attended the ceremony, which was officiated by a minister. Finally, 129 years after her death, Mary Tuplin received a proper burial.

== See also ==
- Lists of solved missing person cases
