= Antoinette Perry (lieutenant governor) =

29th lieutenant governor of Prince Edward Island

The Honourable Antoinette Perry OPEI
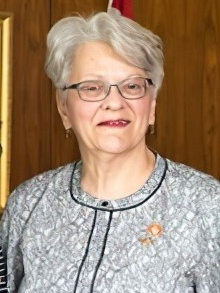
- Perry in 2018

29th Lieutenant Governor of Prince Edward Island
- In office October 20, 2017 – October 17, 2024
- Monarchs: Elizabeth II; Charles III
- Governors General: Julie Payette; Mary Simon
- Premier: Wade MacLauchlan; Dennis King
- Preceded by: H. Frank Lewis
- Succeeded by: Wassim Salamoun

Personal details
- Born: 1953 or 1954 (age 72–73) Tignish, Prince Edward Island, Canada
- Education: Université de Moncton (1976)
- Profession: Schoolteacher, church organist

Antoinette Perry OPEI (born 1953 or 1954) is a Canadian former schoolteacher who served as the 29th lieutenant governor of Prince Edward Island from 2017 to 2024, acting as the province's viceregal representative of Queen Elizabeth II and then of King Charles III. She was appointed on September 14, 2017, by Governor General David Johnston on the constitutional advice of Prime Minister Justin Trudeau, and was sworn in on October 20, 2017, succeeding H. Frank Lewis. Perry's swearing in ceremony took place in Tignish, Prince Edward Island, marking the first time a PEI lieutenant governor was sworn in outside of the province's capital, Charlottetown.

Perry is an Acadian who taught as a schoolteacher for 32 years after attaining a bachelor's degree in music education at the Université de Moncton in 1976, and has also served as the church organist at St. Simon & St. Jude Church in Tignish. Perry, who is single, was the first unmarried lieutenant governor of Prince Edward Island.

== Arms ==
Coat of arms of Antoinette Perry
Crest A blue jay rising Proper wearing a coronet flory and holding in its beak a mullet Or issuant from a coronet erablé Gules. Escutcheon Azure a rank of organ pipes Or charged with a treble clef Gules. Supporters Two Doberman pinschers each gorged of oregano and summer savoury leaves standing on a verdant base set with lady’s slipper flowers and oak leaves bordered by sandstone cliffs beaches and the sea Proper. Motto One day at a time
