= Great Seal of Prince Edward Island =

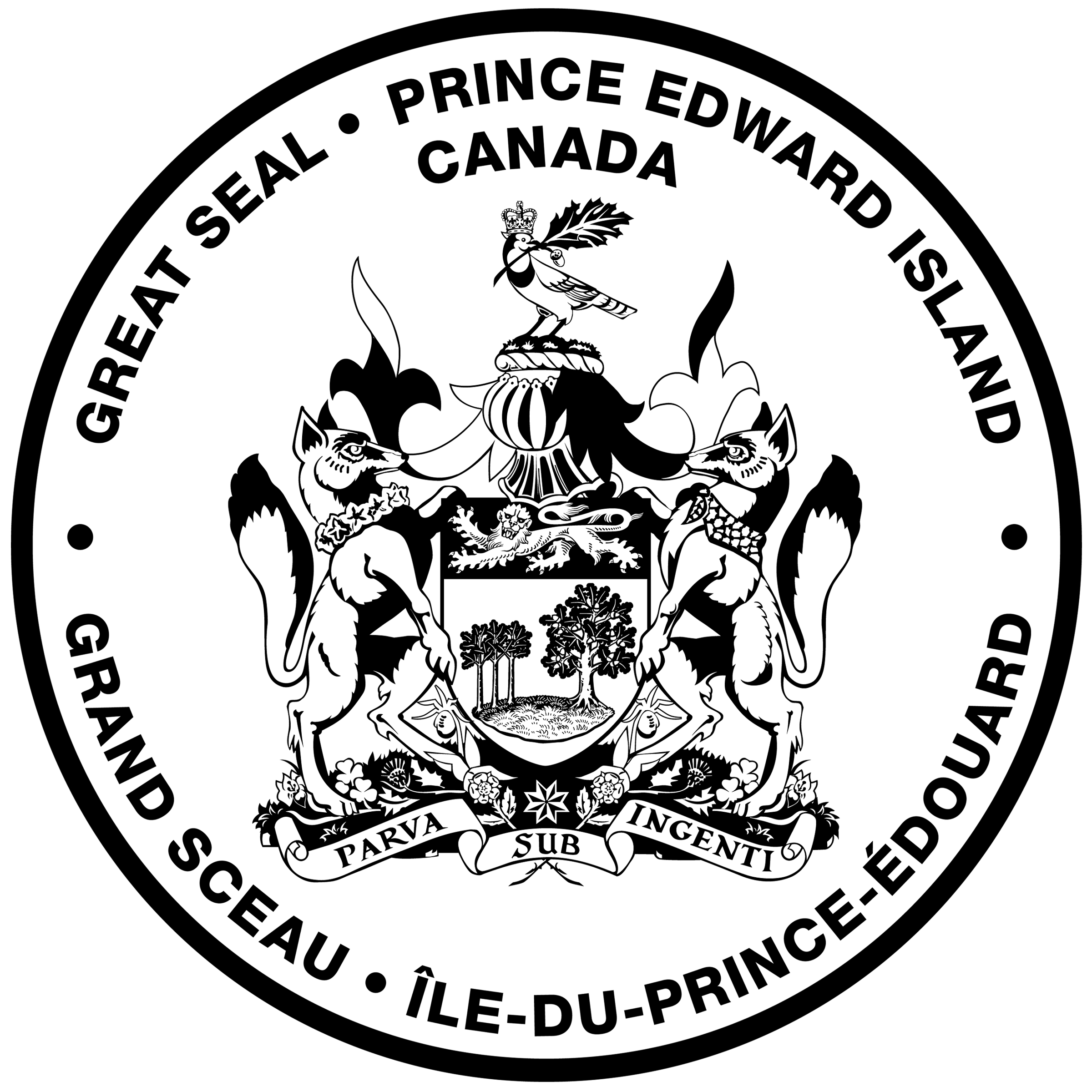
Great Seal of Prince Edward Island

Great Seal of Prince Edward Island is a seal used to authenticate documents issued by the government of Prince Edward Island that are released in the name of the King in Right, including the appointment of the Executive Council and Ministers (the Cabinet).

== Design ==
The current seal consist of the Coat of Arms of Prince Edward Island with the border with the words The Great Seal of the Province of Prince Edward Island - Grand Sceau l'Île-du-Prince-Édouard.

== History ==
External videos
- "How the Great Seal of P.E.I. was stolen by American privateers, and never returned" – CBC News (2:18 min)

The Great Seal of Prince Edward Island was granted in 1769 as St. John's Island and several seals created after 1815 as Prince Edward Island. The 1769 seal was a double sided seal with the King's arms on one side and the shield from the colonial on the other; it was stolen in 1775 by American forces and never returned.

The current Great Seal was introduced in 2002 via Vice-Regal Warrant.

== See also ==
- Symbols of Prince Edward Island
