= Gerard Mitchell =

Canadian judge

Gerard Eugene Mitchell BA LL.B (born 1943 in Charlottetown, Prince Edward Island) is a former Canadian judge and Chief Justice of Prince Edward Island.

He was educated at Grand Tracadie Consolidated and St. Dunstan's High School. He received his BA from St. Dunstan's University in 1964 and was a school teacher until 1967, when he returned to school to get his law degree from the University of New Brunswick in 1970. He practiced law in PEI from 1970 to 1975, when he was named to the provincial court as a judge. He resigned in 1977 to return to private practice until 1981, when he was appointed to the PEI Supreme Court. He served as Chief Justice from 1987 until 2008, when he was succeeded by David Jenkins. In 2009 he was appointed P.E.I.'s Police Commissioner.
