= Edward James Jarvis =

Canadian lawyer, judge, and politician

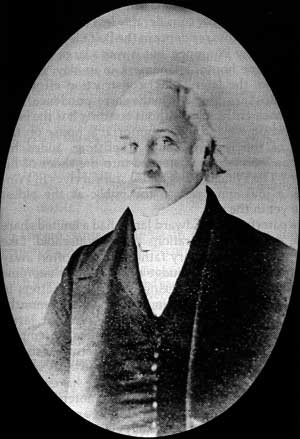
Edward James Jarvis

Edward James Jarvis (1788 – 9 May 1852) was a Canadian lawyer, judge, and politician.

He was born the youngest son of Munson Jarvis of Saint John, New Brunswick and educated at King's College, Windsor, Nova Scotia, where he was awarded B.A. in 1809. He was admitted to the New Brunswick bar as an attorney at law in 1811 and became a Notary public in Saint John in 1812. In January 1813 he sailed to London to continue his legal studies at the Inner Temple and returned to Saint John in 1816 to practise law.

In 1821 he was appointed Clerk of the House of Assembly. In 1823, after travelling to London in search of a good position, was sent to Malta as King's Assessor (effectively Attorney General), holding the post until 1827. He then returned to Prince Edward Island to be sworn in as Chief Justice of Prince Edward Island on 30 August 1828, holding the position until his death.

He died in 1852. He had married twice; firstly Anna Maria Boyd, with whom he had 8 children and secondly Elizabeth Gray, with whom he had 3 children.
