= Provincial Court of Prince Edward Island =

Province of Prince Edward Island court of justice

- The provincial arms as used by the Provincial Court
- Jurisdiction: Prince Edward Island
- Website: courts.pe.ca/provincial-court

The Provincial Court of Prince Edward Island is the provincial court of the Canadian province of Prince Edward Island, established according to the Provincial Court Act.

The Provincial Court has three judges, who sit in Summerside, Charlottetown, and Georgetown. The Court has jurisdiction to hear criminal offences and cases contrary to provincial legislation.

The Provincial Court judges also serve as judges of the Youth Court, which hears cases pursuant to the Youth Criminal Justice Act.

Applications for judicial reviews for decisions made in Provincial Court can be heard by the Supreme Court of Prince Edward Island, and appeals can be heard by the Court of Appeal of Prince Edward Island.

== Current Judges ==
Position	Name	Appointed	Nominated by	Position Prior to Appointment
Provincial Court Judge	Nancy K. Orr	1995	Catherine Callbeck	Lawyer at PEI Legal Aid
Provincial Court Judge	Krista J. MacKay	2020	Dennis King	Prothonotary of the Supreme Court of Prince Edward Island
Chief Provincial Court Judge	Jeffrey E. Lantz	2005	Pat Binns	Minister of Education and Attorney-General of Prince Edward Island
