= John P. Sullivan (politician) =

Canadian politician

John P. Sullivan (April 23, 1843 – September 30, 1898) was a farmer, merchant and political figure on Prince Edward Island. He represented 2nd Kings in the Legislative Assembly of Prince Edward Island from 1890 to 1893 as a Conservative.

Sullivan was born in New London, Prince Edward Island, the son of William Sullivan and Mary McCarthy, Irish immigrants. He was a general merchant in St. Peters. He was married twice: to Ellen MacDonald in 1873 and Helen MacDonald in 1877. Sullivan was defeated when he ran for reelection in 1893. He died suddenly at the age of 56 while travelling to Charlottetown.

Sullivan's brother William Wilfred Sullivan served as provincial premier.

Sullivan's former home in St. Peter's Bay, now known as the Tír na nÓg Inn, has been designated as a historic place by the province.
