= Monarchy in Prince Edward Island =

Function of the Canadian monarchy in Prince Edward Island

King in Right of Prince Edward Island
- Provincial
- King's Arms in Right of Prince Edward Island

Incumbent
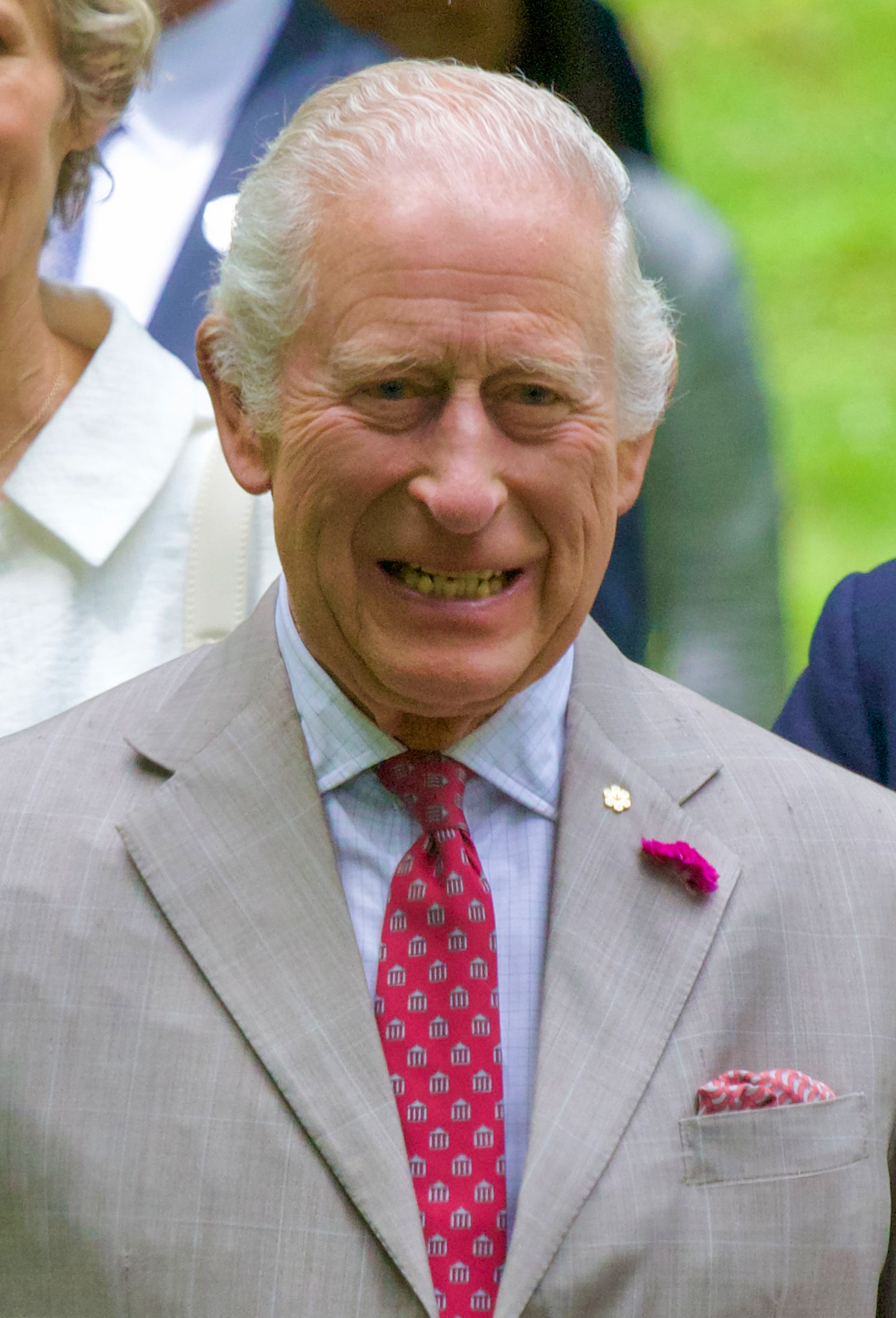
- Charles III; King of Canada since 8 September 2022

Details
- Style: His Majesty
- First monarch: Victoria
- Formed: 1 July 1873

By the arrangements of the Canadian federation, the Canadian monarchy operates in Prince Edward Island as the core of the province's Westminster-style parliamentary democracy. As such, the Crown within Prince Edward Island's jurisdiction is referred to as the Crown in Right of Prince Edward Island, His Majesty in Right of Prince Edward Island, or the King in Right of Prince Edward Island. The Constitution Act, 1867, however, leaves many royal duties in Prince Edward Island specifically assigned to the sovereign's viceroy, the lieutenant governor of Prince Edward Island, whose direct participation in governance is limited by the conventional stipulations of constitutional monarchy.

== Constitutional role ==
The role of the Crown is both legal and practical; it functions in Prince Edward Island in the same way it does in all of Canada's other provinces, being the centre of a constitutional construct in which the institutions of government acting under the sovereign's authority share the power of the whole. It is thus the foundation of the executive, legislative, and judicial branches of the province's government.

The Canadian monarch—since 8 September 2022, King Charles III—is represented and his duties carried out by the lieutenant governor of Prince Edward Island, whose direct participation in governance is limited by the conventional stipulations of constitutional monarchy, with most related powers entrusted for exercise by the elected parliamentarians, the ministers of the Crown generally drawn from among them, and the judges and justices of the peace. The Crown today primarily functions as a guarantor of continuous and stable governance and a nonpartisan safeguard against the abuse of power. This arrangement began with an 1873 order-in-council by Queen Victoria and continued an unbroken line of monarchical government extending back to the early 16th century. However, though Prince Edward Island has a separate government headed by the King, as a province, Prince Edward Island is not itself a kingdom.

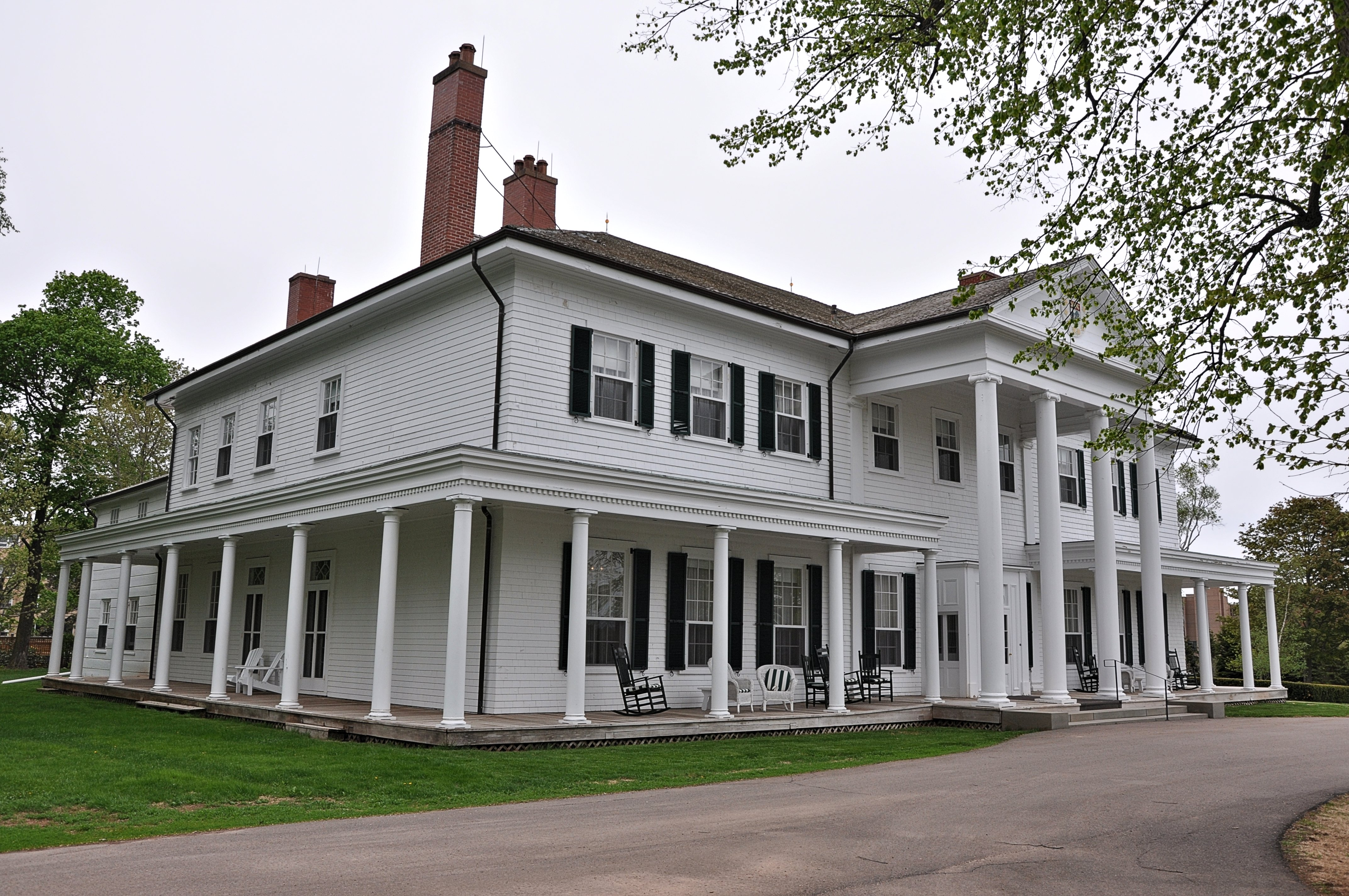
Government House, or Fanningbank, in Charlottetown

Government House in Charlottetown is owned by the sovereign in his capacity as King in Right of Prince Edward Island and is used as an official residence by the lieutenant governor, and the monarch when in Prince Edward Island. It is also where the Executive Council is sworn-in and honours are given to Prince Edward Islanders.

According to the Legislative Assembly's Members' Handbook, members are not permitted to speak "disrespectfully of the Queen, the royal family, the governor general, the lieutenant governor, or the administrator of the province", as, "by their rank and position, they are entitled to respect from members." What constitutes unacceptable language "depends largely on circumstances". However, insults, obscene language, or questioning a royal or viceregal person's integrity, honesty, or character is disallowed.

== Royal associations ==
Those in the royal family perform ceremonial duties when on a tour of the province; the royal persons do not receive any personal income for their service, only the costs associated with the exercise of these obligations are funded by both the Canadian and Prince Edward Island Crowns in their respective councils.

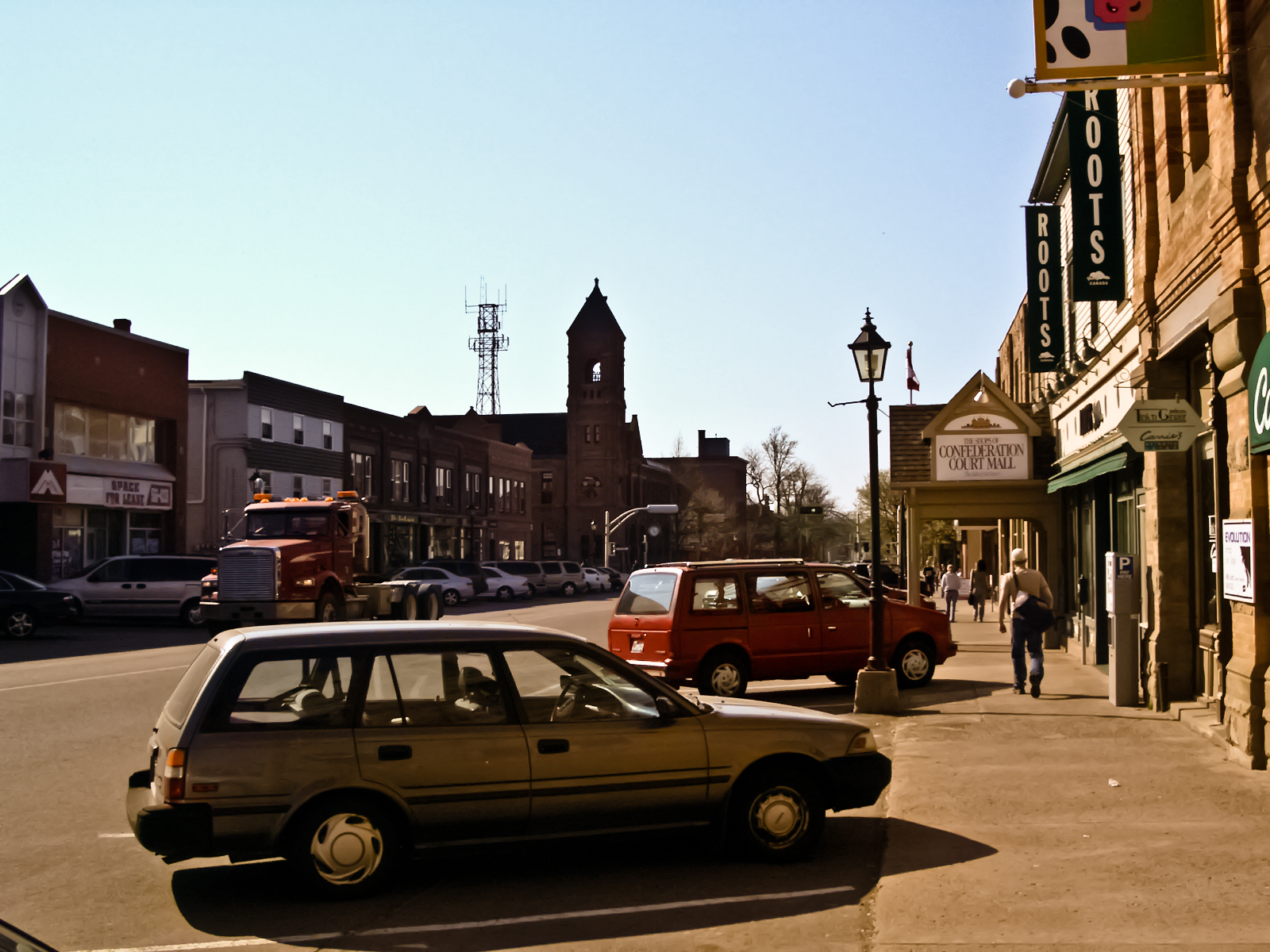
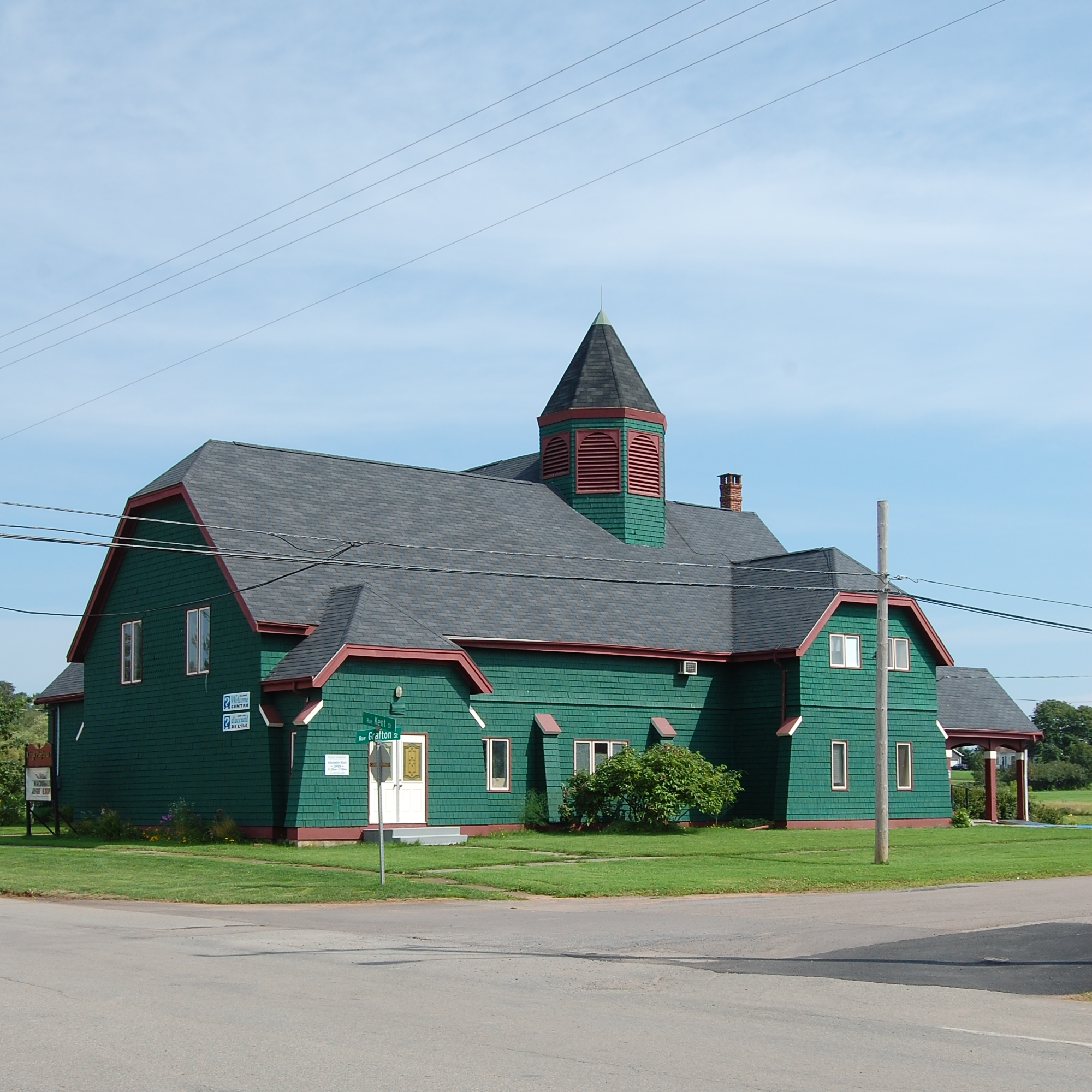
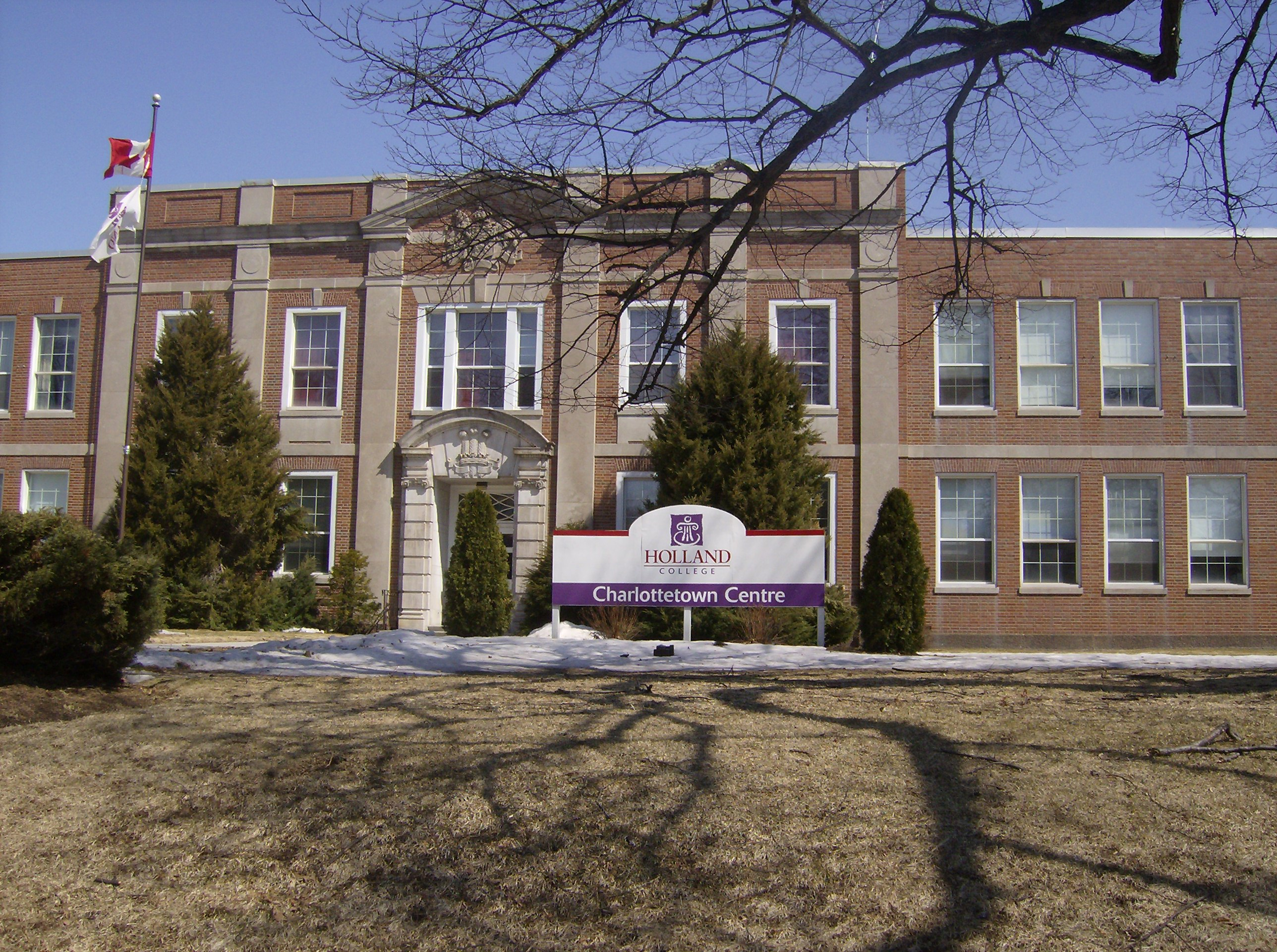
From top to bottom: Charlottetown, named for Queen Charlotte; the Kings County Playhouse in Georgetown, King's County, both of which are named in honour of King George III; Prince of Wales College, which derived its name from Prince Edward, Prince of Wales (later King Edward VII)

Monuments around Prince Edward Island mark some of those visits, while others honour a royal personage or event. Further, Prince Edward Island's monarchical status is illustrated by royal names applied regions, communities, schools, and buildings, many of which may also have a specific history with a member or members of the royal family; Prince Edward Island is itself named in honour of Prince Edward, Duke of Kent and Strathearn. Associations also exist between the Crown and many private organizations within the province; these may have been founded by a royal charter, received a royal prefix, and/or been honoured with the patronage of a member of the royal family. Examples include the Central Agricultural Society, which was under the patronage of Prince Albert, Prince Consort, after 1843.

The main symbol of the monarchy is the sovereign himself, his image (in portrait or effigy) thus being used to signify government authority. A royal cypher or crown may also illustrate the monarchy as the locus of authority, without referring to any specific monarch. Further, though the monarch does not form a part of the constitutions of Prince Edward Island's honours, they do stem from the Crown as the fount of honour and so bear on the insignia symbols of the sovereign.

== History ==
=== Foundations of the Crown in Prince Edward Island ===
What is today Prince Edward Island was discovered and claimed by John Cabot for King Henry VII; though, it was in 1523 also claimed by Giovanni da Verrazzano for King Francis I, putting Île Saint-Jean, as Verrazzno called it, under the sovereignty of the French Crown. As a consequence of the Acadians' refusal to swear allegiance to King George III and their subsequent expulsion from British-controlled Nova Scotia, between 1755 and 1764, Île Saint-Jean's population rose to approximately 5,000.

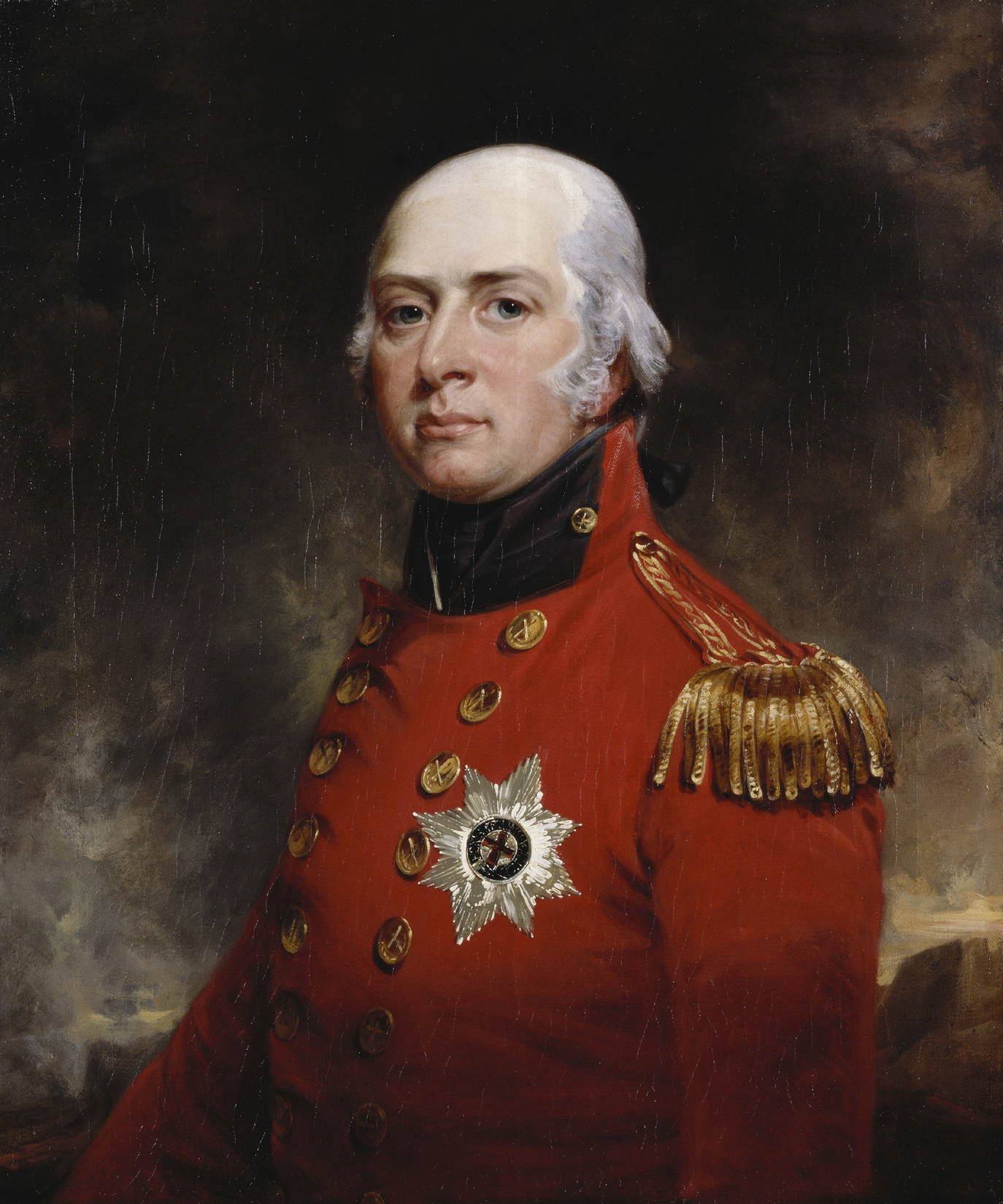
(Clockwise from top) Prince Edward in 1799; the coat of arms of Prince Edward; the King's Arms in Right of Prince Edward Island with the gold lion passant drawn from the Prince's arms

However, these new arrivals found themselves once again under the British Crown following the signing of the 1762 Treaty of Fontainbleau, which transferred sovereignty over the island from King Louis XV to King George III, who merged it with Nova Scotia. The following year, the Earl of Egmont presented an elaborate memorial to the King, asking that the Island of Saint John be granted to him and divided into baronies. After initially denying Egmont's request, George, swayed by Egmont's second petition in 1767, approved. On 19 July 1769, Saint John Island was separated from the jurisdiction of Nova Scotia and became its own colony of the British Crown.

During the American Revolutionary War, which took place between 1775 and 1783, Charlottetown was raided by a pair of US-employed privateers who imprisoned the colonial administrator, Phillips Callbeck, standing-in during the absence of Lieutenant Governor Walter Patterson. Both as the conflict proceeded and after it ended, some 46,000 American settlers loyal to the Crown, known as the United Empire Loyalists, fled north to the Maritimes and other colonies in the Canadas. The King-in-Council granted each family 0.81 square kilometres (200 acres) of land. Though the majority settled on the mainland, the government of St. John's Island had some success with its effort to attract the exiles, about 2,000 of them immigrating to the colony.

One of George III's sons, Prince Edward, arrived in Halifax, Nova Scotia, in 1794. Though Edward never visited the island (a planned royal tour in 1800 was cancelled after the Prince was injured in a riding accident), he, as Commander-in-Chief of the British forces in North America, ordered that new barracks be built in Charlottetown and defences constructed to protect the harbour; completed in 1805, this was named the Prince Edward Battery. (The cannons there today bear the royal cyphers of both Edward's father, King George III, and Edward's daughter, Queen Victoria.) Recognising the Prince's interest in the island, its legislature passed a bill that received royal assent on 2 February 1799, with effect on 6 June of the same year, changing the colony's name in honour of Edward. The gold lion passant on the modern arms of the King in right of the province refers to Prince Edward's coat of arms. Kent College, named for Prince Edward's Dukedom of Kent, was established in 1804 by Lieutenant Governor Edmund Fanning and his Legislative Council. The college would eventually become the University of Prince Edward Island.

=== The 19th century ===
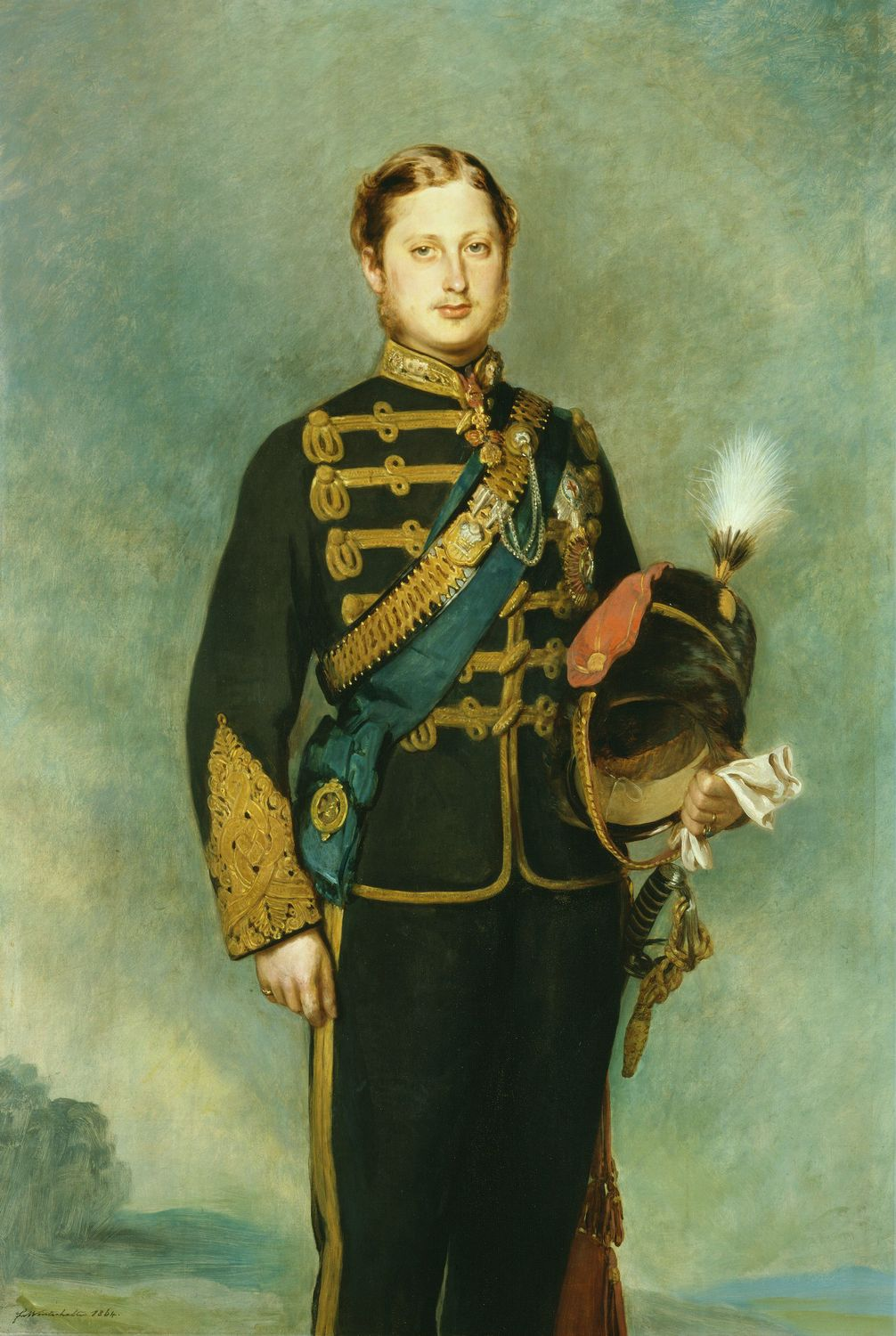
Prince Albert Edward, Prince of Wales, in 1864, four years after he visited Prince Edward Island, making him the first member of the royal family to do so

By 1843, construction of Province House was begun and the laying of the cornerstone was followed by a royal salute and three cheers for Queen Victoria. Not four years after, the Legislative Assembly adopted an address to the Queen, asking for the establishment of responsible government in the colony, as had been done in a number of other jurisdictions in the Canadas, and the request was soon thereafter granted.

The Liberal Reform Party won the plurality of seats in the Legislative Assembly in 1850 and made responsible government a key goal. They faced opposition from Lieutenant Governor Ambrose Lane, but, would not relent and the legislature "virtually went 'on strike'" the following year, voting non-confidence in the Executive Council and refusing to pass supply bills. The impasse was finally overcome when the Lieutenant Governor invited George Coles to form a PEI's first responsible government.

Prince Albert Edward (the future King Edward VII), the eldest son of, and heir to, Queen Victoria, landed at Charlottetown, on 10 August 1860, where he was welcomed by George Dundas, the colony's Lieutenant Governor, and proceeded to Government House. There, the Prince held audience with the Executive Council and, later, attended a formal ball and levee. Albert Edward toured the countryside and visited Province House, where he received an addresses from the Executive Council. Upon his departure, the Prince left £150 with the Governor for charitable use.

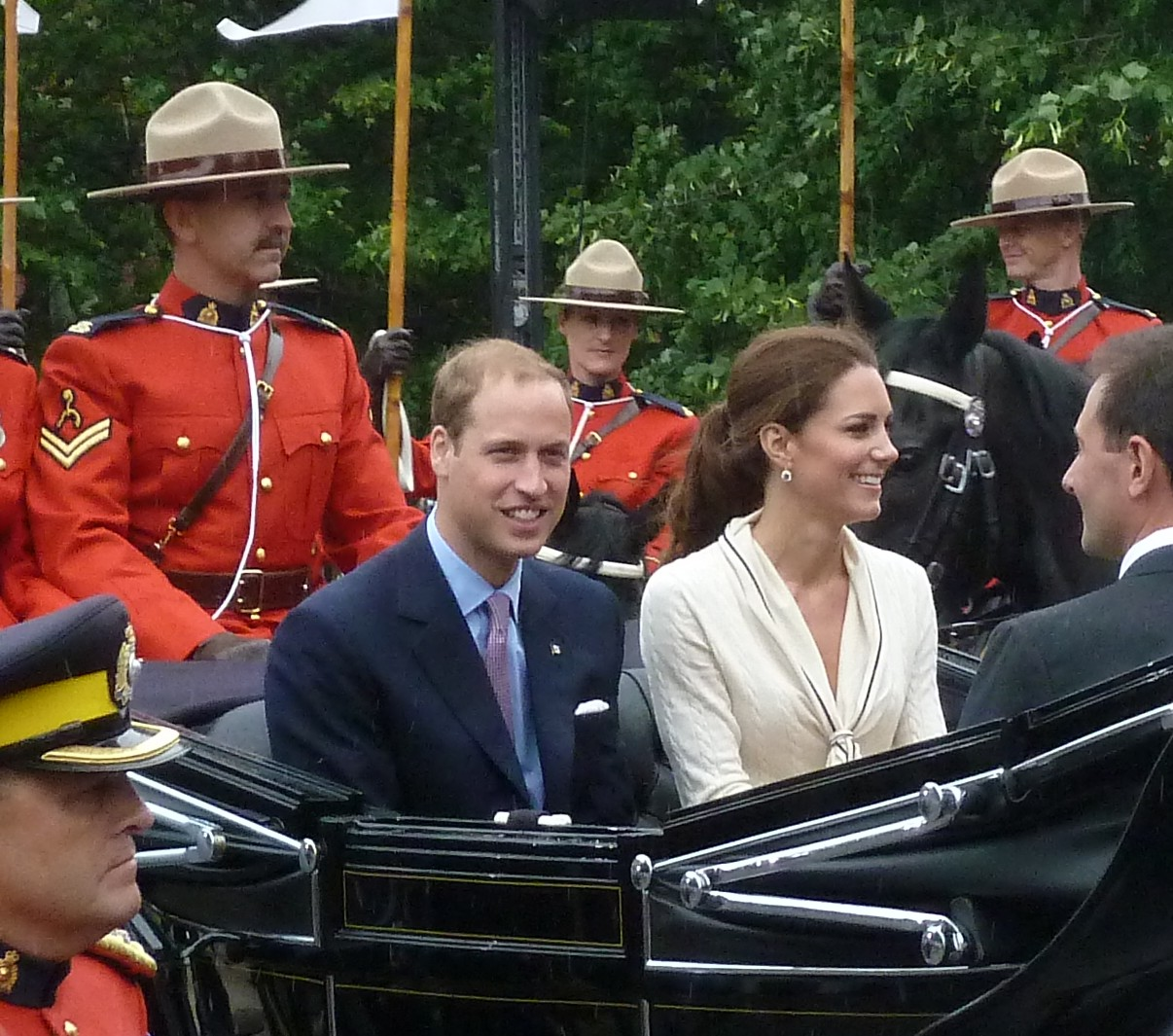
Prince William, Duke of Cambridge, and Catherine, Duchess of Cambridge, in Charlottetown, 2011

=== The 20th and 21st centuries ===
Prince Albert (later King George VI) arrived on Prince Edward Island in 1913, while serving as a midshipman aboard the Royal Navy cruiser HMS Cumberland, spending some leisure time coaching a cricket match.

Queen Elizabeth II attended the 100th anniversary of Prince Edward Island's entry into Confederation. Her son, Prince Charles (now King Charles III), toured the island in 2014, following his son, Prince William, and William's wife, Catherine, Duchess of Cambridge, who travelled through PEI in 2011. While he was in Charlottetown, William gave a speech at Province House, standing where his ancestor, Prince Edward, had stood 151 years before, and said, "it is quite a moment for Catherine and me to be standing here in the Atlantic Canada, in front of Province House, where Canadian federation was forged [...] Here, in the crucible of Canadian nationhood, we look forward to meeting many of you."

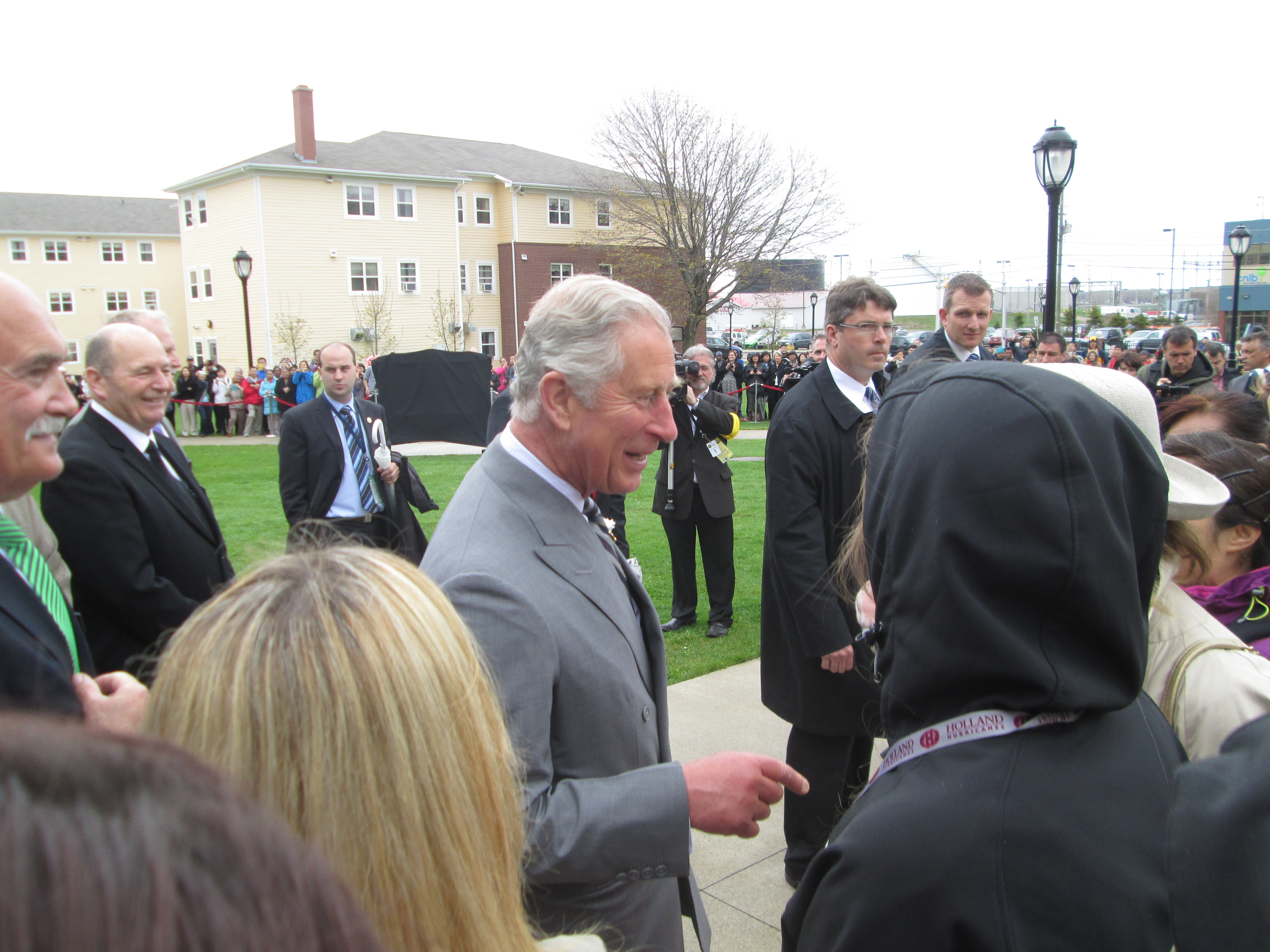
Prince Charles at Holland College, 2014

In 2022, Prince Edward Island instituted a provincial Platinum Jubilee medal to mark the Queen's seventy years on the Canadian throne; the first time in Canada's history that a royal occasion was commemorated on provincial medals.

== See also ==
- Symbols of Prince Edward Island
- Monarchy
