= Government House (Prince Edward Island) =

Residence of the Lieutenant Governor of Prince Edward Island

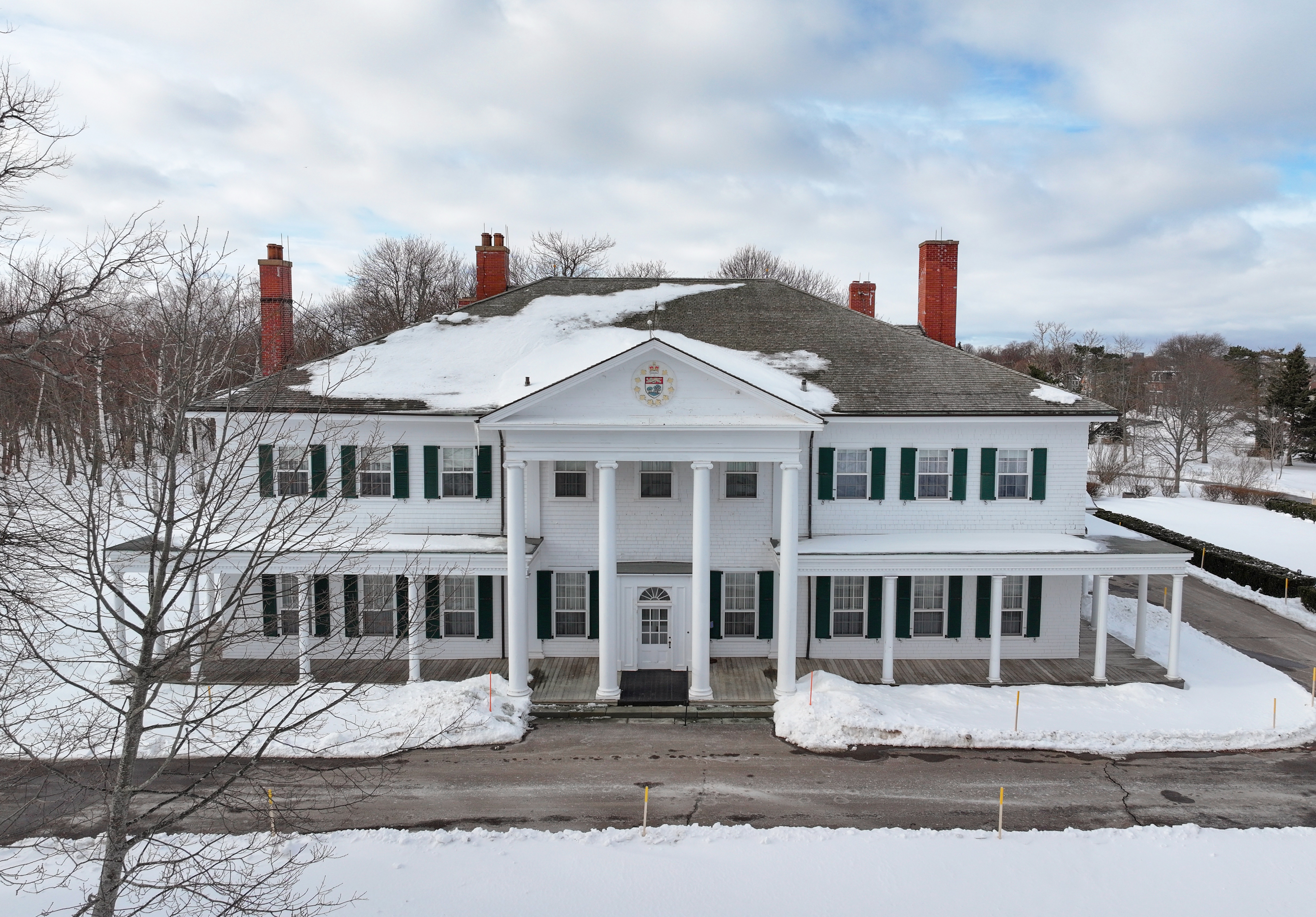
- Fanningbank

General information
- Architectural style: Palladian Georgian
- Location: 1 Terry Fox Drive; Charlottetown, Prince Edward Island; C1A 8T6, Canada
- Coordinates: 46.231168°N 63.136148°W
- Construction started: 1834
- Client: The King of the United Kingdom (William IV)
- Owner: The King in Right of Prince Edward Island (Charles III)

Technical details
- Structural system: Timber framing

National Historic Site of Canada
- Official name: Government House National Historic Site of Canada
- Designated: 1971-05-27
- Reference no.: 578

Prince Edward Island Heritage Place
- Official name: Government House
- Type: Provincial Designated Heritage Place
- Designated: 2001-10-26
- Reference no.: 3243

Prince Edward Island Heritage Place
- Official name: Government House
- Type: Heritage Resource (Charlottetown)
- Designated: 1979-10-26
- Reference no.: 3375

Government House of Prince Edward Island, often referred to as Fanningbank, is the official residence of the lieutenant governor of Prince Edward Island. The vice-regal residence is located in the provincial capital of Charlottetown. It stands in the provincial capital at 1 Terry Fox Drive; while the equivalent building in many provinces has a prominent, central place in the capital, the site of Prince Edward Island's Government House is relatively unobtrusive within Charlottetown, giving it more the character of a private home.

== History ==
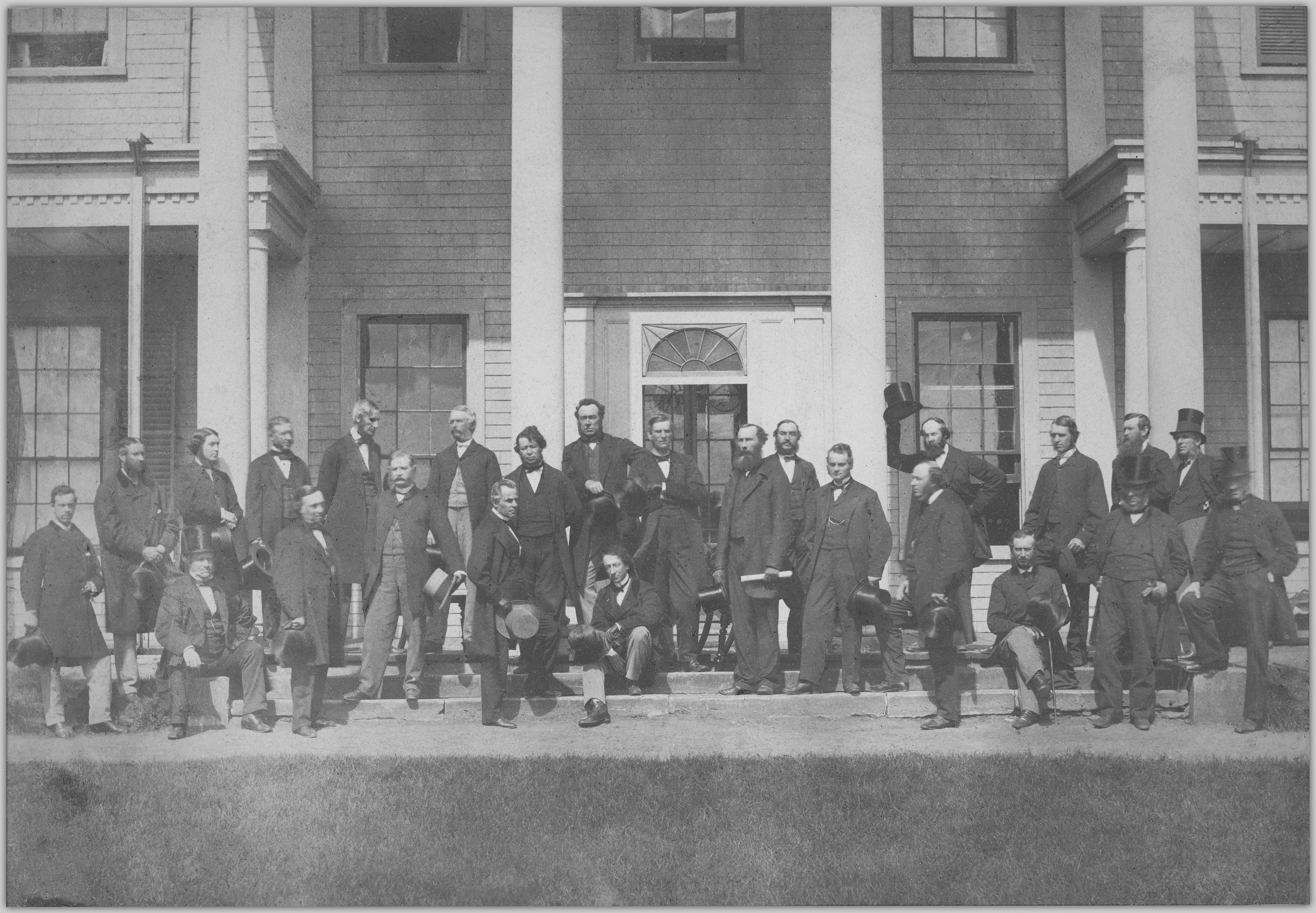
The Fathers of Confederation gathered on the steps of Government House for the Charlottetown Conference, 1864

Government House was constructed between 1832 and 1834 as a viceregal residence for the lieutenant governor of the then British colony of Prince Edward Island. The land, a parcel of 100 acres (0.40 km^{2}) known as Fanning Bank or Fanning's Bank, was in 1789 set aside by Lieutenant Governor Edmund Fanning as Crown land, with the specific stipulation that it be used as the site for the governor's residence. In 1873, approximately 10 acres (40,000 m^{2}) was retained for Government House and its grounds. 40 acres was given to the City of Charlottetown and later became Victoria Park.

Government House was designated a National Historic Site of Canada in 1971.

== Use ==
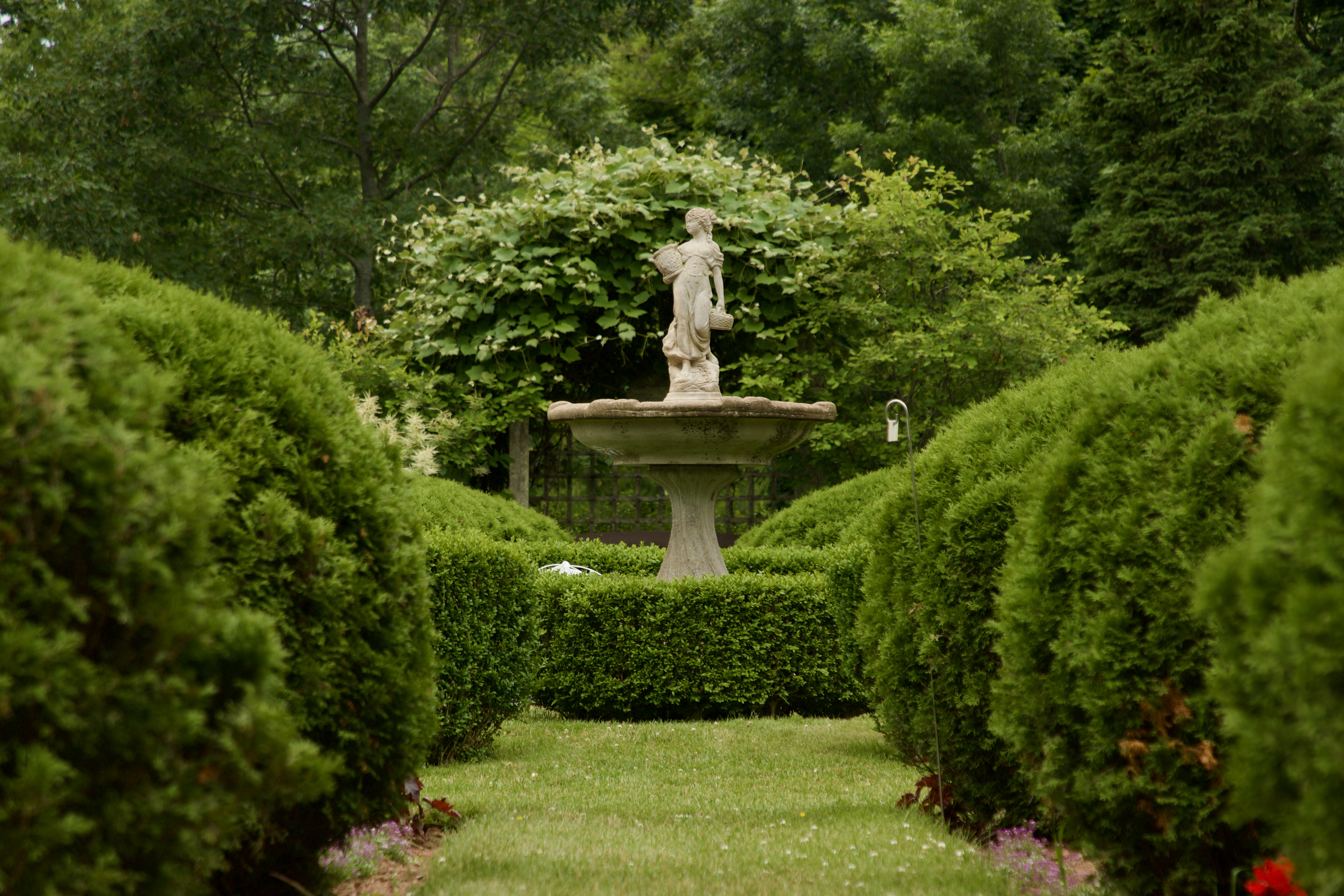
Vice-regal gardens at Fanningbank, Charlottetown

Government House is the official residence of the lieutenant governor and his or her spouse and "also serves as a centre of official hospitality in the province" where many distinguished visitors to Prince Edward Island are entertained. Queen Elizabeth II and Prince Philip, Duke of Edinburgh stayed at the house during their royal visit in 1959. The house hosts events such as the bestowing of provincial awards or inductions into the Order of Prince Edward Island, as well as luncheons, dinners, receptions, and speaking engagements. It is also at the vice-regal residence that the lieutenant governor drops the writs of election, swears-in new members of the Executive Council, and holds audiences with the premier.

The property is owned by the King in Right of Prince Edward Island and is open to the public for certain periods during the summer.

== Architecture and interiors ==
The wood-frame building's architectural design is Georgian with echoes of the Palladian tradition. The two axes of the house converge on the main entrance hall, which has doric columns and pilasters and a double switchback stair leading to the second floor. The residence was designed by Yorkshire architect Isaac Smith, who also designed the Island's Colonial Building.

== See also ==
- Government Houses in Canada
- Government Houses of the British Empire
