= Symbols of Prince Edward Island =

Prince Edward Island is one of Canada's provinces, and has established several provincial symbols.

== Symbols ==
	Symbol	Image	Adopted	Remarks
Coat of arms	Coat of arms of Prince Edward Island	Coat of arms of Prince Edward Island	December 13, 2002	Coat of arms was authorized by Vice-regal Warrant dated April 26, 2002, and by an act of the Legislature.
Motto	Parva sub ingenti The small under the protection of the great		December 13, 2002	Granted with other elements of the coat of arms
Flag	Flag of Prince Edward Island	Flag of Prince Edward Island	1964	Duplicates the design of the shield of arms of Prince Edward Island.
Seal	Great Seal of Prince Edward Island	Great Seal of Prince Edward Island	December 13, 2002	The Great Seal of Prince Edward Island was originally granted by royal warrant of King Edward VII on May 30, 1905, and the current seal was authorized by Vice-Regal Warrant in 2002.
Bird	Blue jay Cyanocitta cristata	Blue jay	1977	The blue jay was named as the provincial bird in 1977, following a public vote held in 1976.
Flower	Lady's slipper Cypripedium acaule	Lady's slipper	April 25, 1947	
Tree	Red oak Quercus rubra	Red oak	1987	
Tartan	Reddish-brown, green, white and yellow		1960	Tartan of Prince Edward Island was designed by Mrs. Jean Reed
Soil	Charlottetown soil	Charlottetown soil		The Charlottetown soil is the most predominant on the Island, accounting for roughly 470,000 acres (1,900 km^{2}) of land.
Orders	Order of Prince Edward Island	Order Prince Edward Island ribbon bar		The Order of Prince Edward Island is the highest honour the Province can bestow.
Anthem	"The Island Hymn"		May 7, 2010	The words of the patriotic song of Prince Edward Island, were written by Lucy Maud Montgomery and performed for the first time in public on May 22, 1908. The 2010 Spring Session of the Legislature passed amendments that included "The Island Hymn" as the provincial anthem.
Animal	Red Fox	Fox – British Wildlife Centre (17429406401)		
