= Robert Cox (Canadian politician) =

Canadian politician (1850–1934)

Robert N. Cox (October 12, 1850 – April 19, 1934) was a merchant and political figure on Prince Edward Island. He represented 2nd Kings in the Legislative Assembly of Prince Edward Island from 1908 to 1911 and from 1920 to 1923 as a Liberal.

He was born in Charlottetown, the son of John Benjamin Cox, a native of Newfoundland. In 1885, he married Elizabeth Sutherland. He operated a general store in Morell for many years. Cox was also involved in lobster packing, fox ranching, potato starch manufacturing and farming. He served in the province's Executive Council as a minister without portfolio. He was defeated when he ran for reelection in 1912 and 1923. Cox died of a stroke at home in Charlottetown at the age of 83.
