= William Hooper (Canadian politician) =

Canadian politician

William Hooper (23 July 1824 – 5 January 1899) was a political figure in Prince Edward Island. He represented 2nd Kings in the Legislative Assembly of Prince Edward Island from 1870 to 1873 and from 1879 to 1886 as a Liberal member.

He was born in Northleigh, Devonshire, England, the son of Joseph Hooper, and educated in Honiton. In 1847, he married Louisa Maria Esparanca. Hooper served in the British Commissariat in Bermuda from 1847 to 1850, when he resigned and settled in Prince Edward Island. He was chairman of the board of Railway Appraisers from 1872 to 1873.
