= Coat of arms of Prince Edward Island =

Canadian provincial heraldic symbol

Arms of His Majesty The King in Right of Prince Edward Island

Versions
- Escutcheon-only

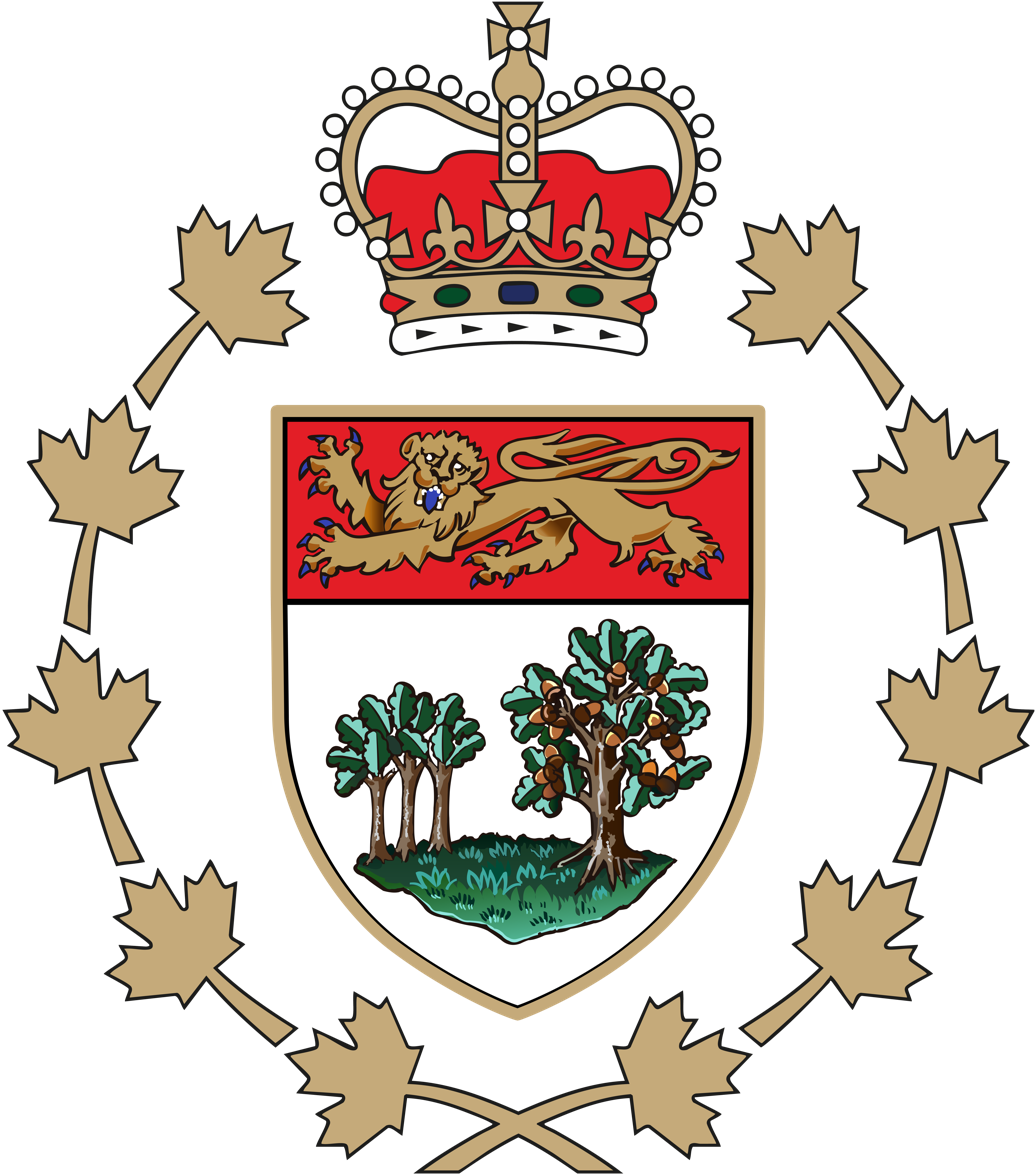
- For use by the Lieutenant Governor of Prince Edward Island
- Armiger: Charles III in Right of Prince Edward Island
- Adopted: 13 December 2002
- Crest: On a grassy mount a blue jay (Cyanocitta cristata) reguardant crowned with the Royal Crown and bearing in its beak a leaf of the red oak tree (Quercus rubra L.) fructed proper;
- Shield: Argent on an island Vert, to the sinister an oak tree fructed, to the dexter thereof three oak saplings sprouting all proper, on a chief Gules a lion passant guardant Or;
- Supporters: Two foxes (Vulpes fulva) Sable embellished Argent, that to the dexter gorged with a collar of potato blossoms proper, that to the sinister gorged with a length of fishnet Argent
- Compartment: A mount Vert set with a Mi'kmaq star Azure between lady's slipper flowers (Cypripedium acaule), red roses, thistles, shamrocks and white garden lilies proper;
- Motto: Parva sub ingenti The small under the protection of the great

The coat of arms of Prince Edward Island, officially the King's Arms in Right of Prince Edward Island, are the coat of arms of Prince Edward Island, being the arms of King Charles III in right of the province. They were created when the shield and motto in the achievement were granted in 1905 by royal warrant from King Edward VII. The latest iteration was given by the Canadian Heraldic Authority in 2002.

== History ==
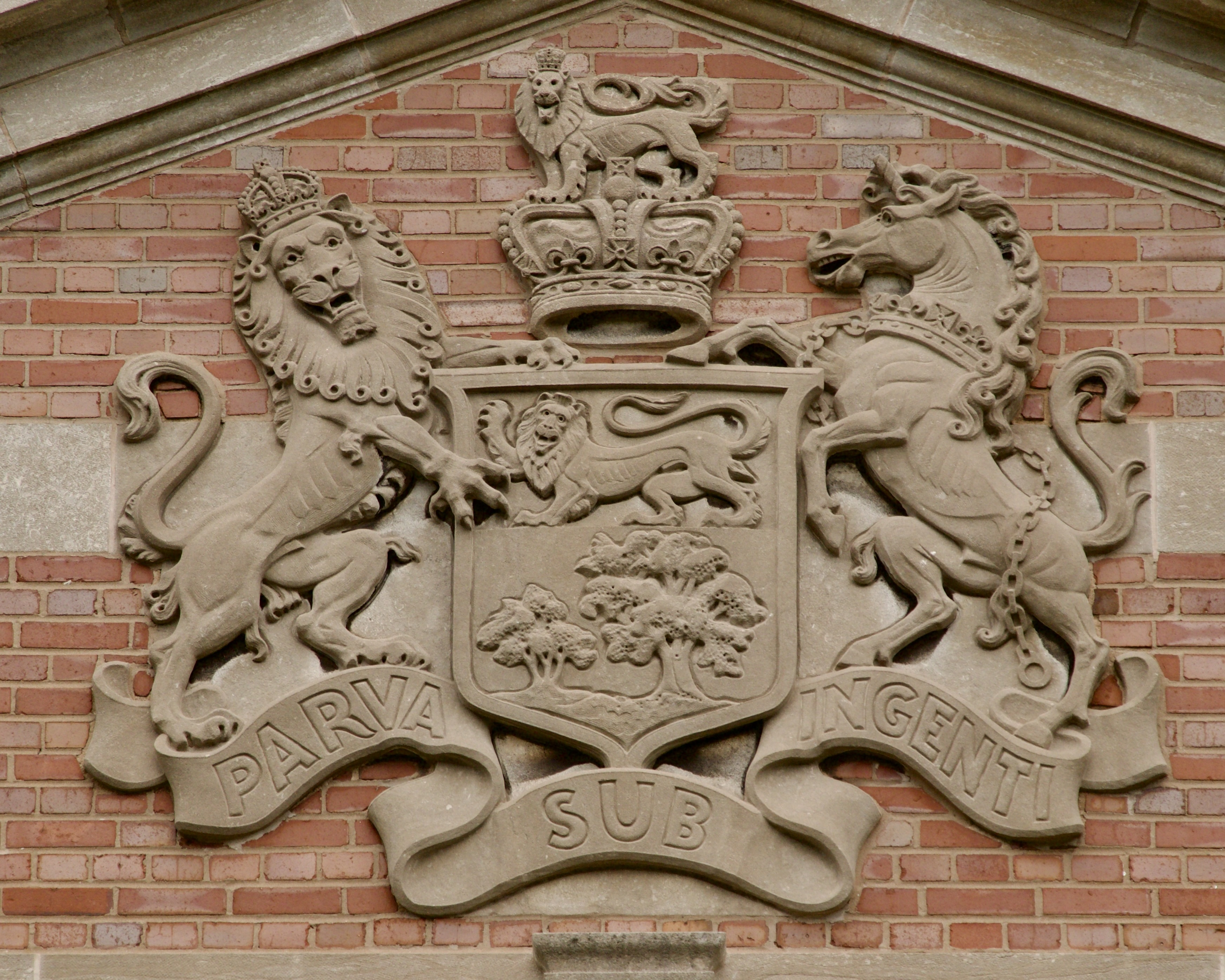
Unofficial PEI armorial based on the British coat of arms, featuring only the provincial shield and motto (1932)

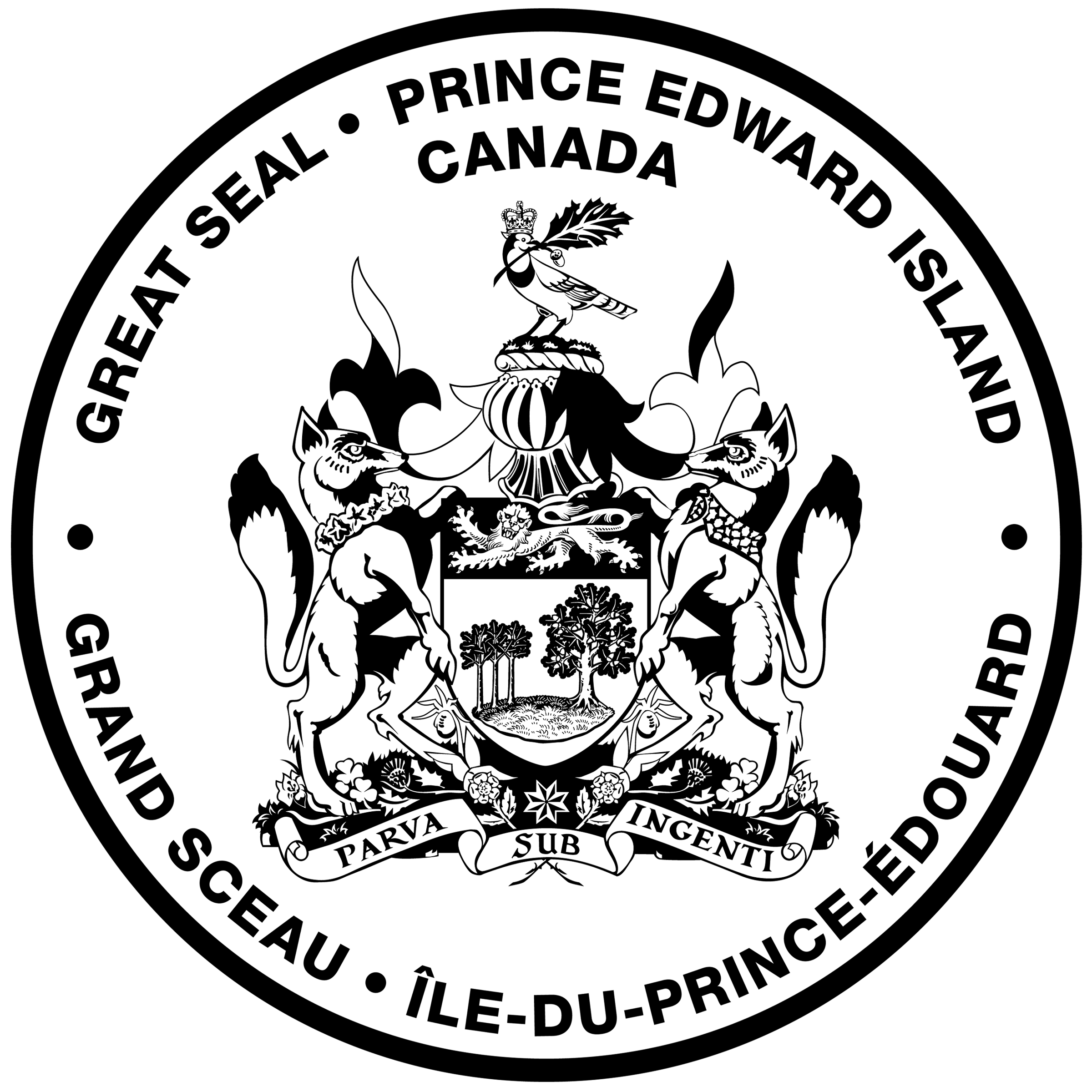
The coat of arms appears on the Great Seal of Prince Edward Island, held by the lieutenant governor and entrusted by him or her to the attorney general.

In the chief of the shield is the lion passant (or "leopard") of England. The lower portion depicts three oak saplings, representing the Island's three counties, beneath a mature oak that originally represented Britain. Prior to the adoption of the current coat of arms, the trees were used, without the lion, as the symbol of the province.

The additions to the arms were granted on 26 April 2002, and the process was completed on 13 December of the same year, when Governor General of Canada Adrienne Clarkson unveiled the crest, supporters, and compartment, after which the full achievement was taken into official use. This was requested by Prince Edward Island Premier Pat Binns to commemorate the 150th anniversary of responsible government on the island.

== Symbolism ==
The crest is a crowned blue jay holding in its beak a sprig of red oak, both symbols of the island. The crown represents royal sovereignty and its use in the arms is an honour granted by the King.

The thistles represent Scotland. The Red rose represents the house of Lancaster whilst the white rose in the middle represents the house of York. The gold lion passant is drawn from the arms of Prince Edward, Duke of Kent and Strathearn.

The supporters are silver foxes, rare animals native to the region; fur farming was perfected on Prince Edward Island, and Island silver fox fur was prized. The fox also represents sagacity and wit. To denote other Island industries, one fox wears a garland of potato blossoms, and another one wears a length of fishing net.

The compartment centres on a Mi'kmaq eight-pointed star symbol representing the sun; this is surrounded by roses for England, lilies for France, thistles for Scotland, and shamrocks for Ireland, as well as Lady's Slippers, the floral emblem of the island.

The island's motto, Parva sub ingenti (the small under the protection of the great), is taken from Virgil's Georgics. The full quotation is:

...etiam Parnasia laurus parva sub ingenti matris se subicit umbra.'
...so too a small plant, beneath its mother's mighty shade, upshoots the laurel-tree of Parnassus.

It has been the island's motto since 1769.

== Blazon ==
The shield was blazoned by Royal Warrant on 30 May 1905, as:

Argent on an island Vert, to the sinister an oak tree fructed, to the dexter thereof three oak saplings sprouting all proper, on a chief Gules a lion passant guardant Or.

The warrant also specified the motto Parva sub ingenti.

This was augmented by proclamation, recorded in the PEI Royal Gazette, 21 December 2002, with the following:

A HELMET: Or mantled Gules doubled Argent with a wreath of these colours;
AND FOR A CREST: On a grassy mount a blue jay (Cyanocitta cristata) reguardant crowned with the Royal Crown and bearing in its beak a leaf of the red oak tree (Quercus rubra L.) fructed proper;
AND FOR SUPPORTERS: Two foxes (Vulpes fulva) Sable embellished Argent, that to the dexter gorged with a collar of potato blossoms proper, that to the sinister gorged with a length of fishnet Argent, both on a mount Vert set with a Mi'kmaq star Azure between lady's slipper flowers (Cypripedium acaule), red roses, thistles, shamrocks and white lilies proper.

== See also ==
- Symbols of Prince Edward Island
- Flag of Prince Edward Island
- List of Canadian provincial and territorial symbols
- Heraldry
- Monarchy in Prince Edward Island
