= Wassim Salamoun =

30th lieutenant governor of Prince Edward Island

His Honour the Honourable Wassim Salamoun OPEI

30th Lieutenant Governor of Prince Edward Island
- Incumbent
- Assumed office October 17, 2024
- Monarch: Charles III
- Governors General: Mary Simon; Louise Arbour
- Premier: Dennis King; Rob Lantz; Bloyce Thompson; Rob Lantz
- Preceded by: Antoinette Perry

Personal details
- Born: 1952 (age 73–74) Machghara, Lebanon
- Children: 2
- Education: University of Bordeaux
- Profession: Otolaryngologist

Wassim Salamoun OPEI (born 1952) is a Lebanese-born Canadian doctor who is the 30th lieutenant governor of Prince Edward Island.

He was born in Machghara, Lebanon, in 1952. He holds a Doctor of Medicine degree from the Université de Bordeaux. He completed his Canadian internship in Moncton, and his surgical training in Halifax, Nova Scotia and in Pittsburgh.

Salamoun is a medical professional from Summerside. Before his retirement in 2022, he was an otolaryngologist (ENT) and medical director for Prince County Hospital, as well as a medical doctor for hospitals in western PEI. Salamoun has received many community awards recognizing his long-time service and outstanding ethical conduct, including the Dr. Tom Moore Award from Prince County Hospital and the Putting Patients First Award from the Medical Society of PEI. He directed Prince County Hospital from 2006 to 2015.

He was sworn in as Lieutenant Governor of Prince Edward Island and invested as a member of the Order of PEI, for which he serves as Chancellor, in a special ceremony on October 17, 2024, at the Confederation Centre of the Arts in Charlottetown. He is the 43rd lieutenant governor since the colony of PEI was established and the 30th since Confederation. He is the first non-European and immigrant-born lieutenant governor in the history of the province.

== See also ==
- Lieutenant Governor of Prince Edward Island

Order of precedence
Preceded by Wendy Lisogar-Cocchia as Lieutenant Governor of British Columbia	Canadian order of precedence as Lieutenant Governor of Prince Edward Island	Succeeded by Bernadette McIntyre as Lieutenant Governor of Saskatchewan
