= Court of Appeal of Prince Edward Island =

Canadian provincial appellate court

- The Royal Arms as used by the Court of Appeal
- Jurisdiction: Prince Edward Island
- Website: courts.pe.ca/court-of-appeal

The Court of Appeal of Prince Edward Island (also known as the Prince Edward Island Court of Appeal, and as PECA in legal abbreviation) is the appellate court for the Canadian province of Prince Edward Island, and thus the senior provincial court below the Supreme Court of Canada. As the number of appeals heard by the Supreme Court of Canada is extremely limited, the Court of Appeal is in practice the court of final appeal for most residents of Prince Edward Island.

The Court is composed of three judges, led by the Chief Justice of Prince Edward Island, currently David H. Jenkins. At any given time there may be one or more additional justices who sit as supernumerary justices. The Court of Appeal derives its jurisdiction from Prince Edward Island's Judicature Act, enacted in its current form in 2008.

== History and functions ==
Prior to 2008 reforms that were formally implemented in 2009, the senior appellate body in Prince Edward Island was the Supreme Court of Prince Edward Island (Appeal Division). With the passage of the Judicature Act, the Supreme Court was stripped of its appellate functions, now assigned to the Court of Appeal, while the Supreme Court of Prince Edward Island remained as a single-division superior court. All members of the former Appeal Division became the justices of the Court of Appeal.

The Court of Appeals hears appeals from the Provincial Court of Prince Edward Island on indictable criminal matters as well as appeals from decisions made by the Supreme Court of Prince Edward Island.

The Appeal Division sits in Charlottetown, Prince Edward Island, in the Sir Louis Henry Davies Law Courts.

Pursuant to the Constitution Act, 1867, the Court of Appeal is operated by the provincial government, while its justices are appointed by the Governor General of Canada, on the advice of the Prime Minister of Canada.

== Current membership ==
Position	Name	Appointed	Nominated by	Position prior to appointment
Chief Justice of PEI	James W. Gormley	2022	Trudeau	Justice of the Supreme Court of PEI
Justice	Michele M. Murphy	2007	Harper	
Justice	Thomas Laughlin	2023	Trudeau	
Supernumerary Justice	John K. Mitchell	2013	Harper	Justice of the Supreme Court of PEI

== Chief Justices of PEI ==
Name	Years	Position prior to appointment	Notes
James W. Gormley	2022–present	Justice of the Supreme Court of PEI	
David H. Jenkins	2008–2021	Justice of the Supreme Court of PEI	
Gerard E. Mitchell	2001–2008	Supreme Court judge	
Norman H. Carruthers	1985–2001		
John Paton Nicholson	1977–1985		
Charles St. Clair Trainor	1970–1976	Queen's County Court judge	
Thane Alexander Campbell	1943–1970	Premier of PEI, 1936-43	
John Alexander Mathieson	1917–1943	Premier of PEI, 1911-17	
William Wilfred Sullivan	1889–1917	Premier of PEI, 1878-89	
Edward Palmer	1874–1889	Queen's County judge	
Robert Hodgson	1852–1874	Lawyer	
Edward James Jarvis	1828–1852	King's Assessor, Malta	
Samuel George William Archibald	1824–1828	Attorney	
Thomas Tremlett	1813–1824	Chief Justice of Newfoundland	Exchanged for Colclough
Caesar Colclough	1805–1813	Barrister	Exchanged for Tremlett
Robert Thorpe	1801–1804	Irish lawyer	Captured by French at sea in 1804
Peter Stewart	1775–1800	Scottish Law Clerk	
John Duport	?–1775		Died in Service

Note that one chief justice is missing from the above list.
