= Supreme Court of Prince Edward Island =

Provincial high court in Canada

- The Royal Arms as used by the Supreme Court

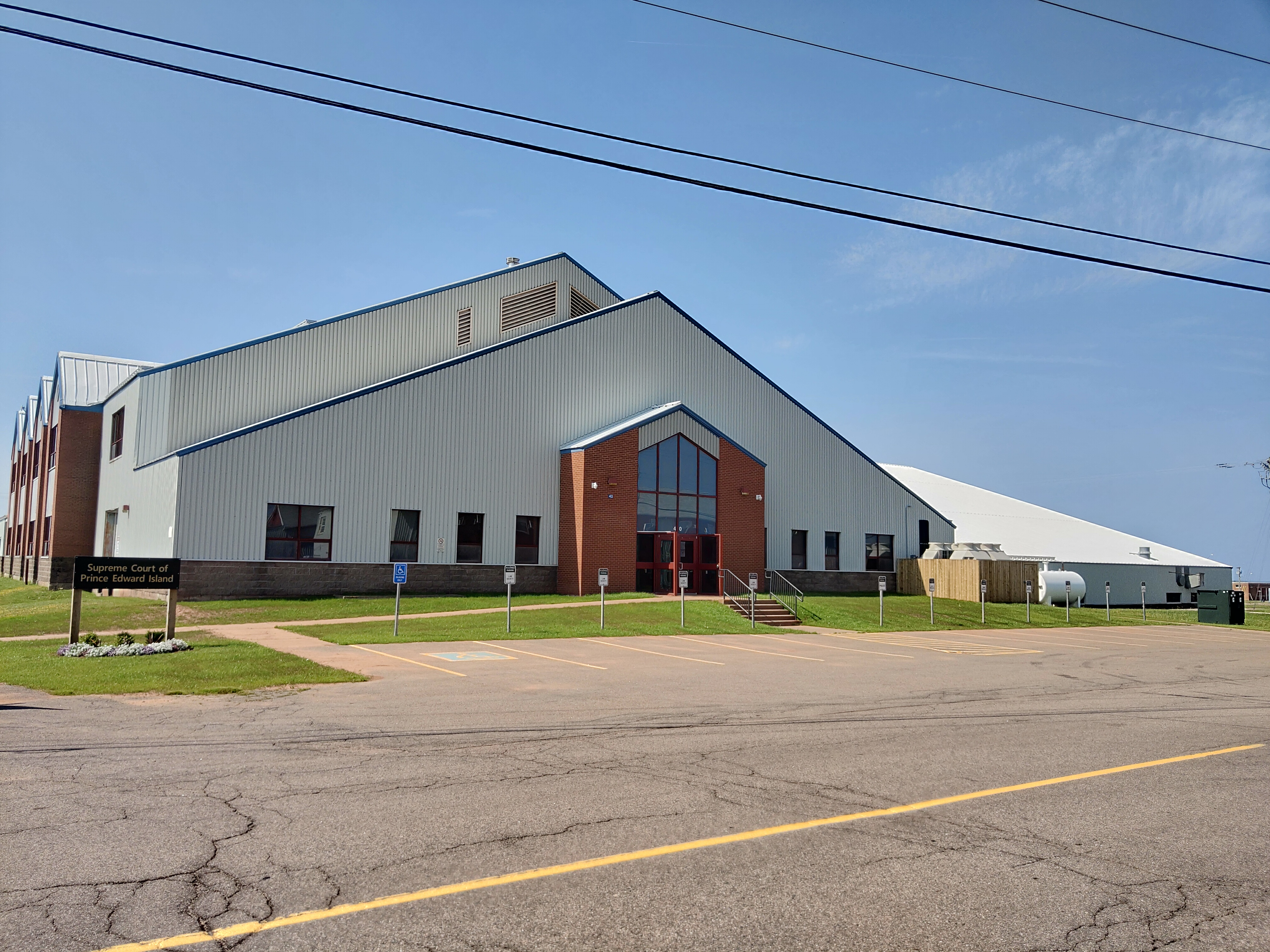
- Jurisdiction: Prince Edward Island
- Appeals to: Court of Appeal of Prince Edward Island
- Website: courts.pe.ca/supreme-court

The Supreme Court of Prince Edward Island (also called the Prince Edward Island Supreme Court, or PESC) is the superior court of the Canadian province of Prince Edward Island.

The Court is composed of five judges, led by its Chief Justice, currently Tracey L. Clements. The Supreme Court derives its jurisdiction from Prince Edward Island's Judicature Act, enacted in its current form in 2008.

== History and functions ==
Prior to 2008 reforms that were formally implemented in 2009, the superior court in Prince Edward Island was the Supreme Court of Prince Edward Island (Trial Division). With the passage of the Judicature Act, the Supreme Court was stripped of its corresponding Appeal Division, now assigned to the newly created Court of Appeal of Prince Edward Island, while the Supreme Court of Prince Edward Island remained as a single-division superior court. All former justices of the Supreme Court (Trial Division) became justices of the Supreme Court.

Pursuant to the Constitution Act, 1867, the Supreme Court is operated by the provincial government, while its justices are appointed by the Governor General of Canada, on the advice of the Prime Minister of Canada. Section 96 of the Constitution Act has traditionally been interpreted as supplying the Supreme Court with inherent jurisdiction.

The Supreme Court sits in Georgetown, Summerside, and the provincial capital of Charlottetown, Prince Edward Island. It deals with pre-trial matters and hears trials dealing with such cases as family matters, estate and probate, as well as indictable criminal matters, which can be heard with or without a jury. It also hears applications for judicial reviews concerning the decisions of tribunals with the Provincial Court of Prince Edward Island.

== Current judges ==
| Position | Name | Appointed | Supernumerary | Nominated by | Position prior to appointment |
|---|---|---|---|---|---|
| Chief Justice | Tracey L. Clements | 2017 | | Trudeau | Lawyer at Stewart McKelvey |
| Justice | Nancy L. Key | 2013 | | Harper | Lawyer at McInnes Cooper |
| Justice | Gregory A. Cann | 2018 | | Trudeau | Lawyer at Cox & Palmer |
| Justice | Jonathan M. Coady | 2022 | | Trudeau | Lawyer at Stewart McKelvey |
| Justice | Sophie MacDonald | 2023 | | Trudeau | Lawyer at Stewart McKelvey |
| Supernumerary Justice | Gordon L. Campbell | 2001 | 2018 | Chrétien | Lawyer at Stewart McKelvey Stirling Scales |

== See also ==
- Judicial appointments in Canada
