= Lieutenant Governor of Prince Edward Island =

Representative in Prince Edward Island of the Canadian monarch

- Emblem of the lieutenant governor

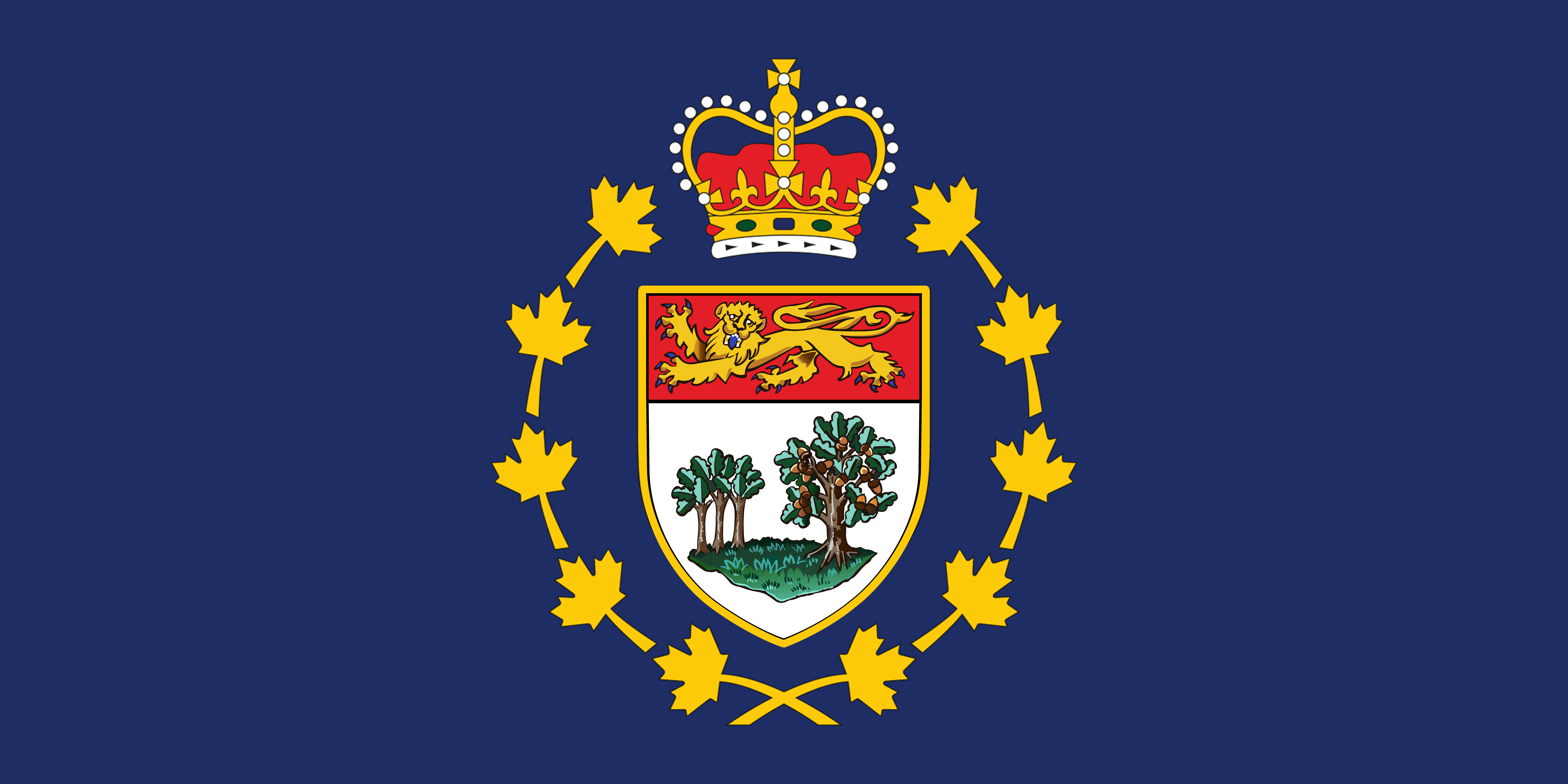
- Flag of the lieutenant governor of Prince Edward Island
- Incumbent; Wassim Salamoun since 17 October 2024
- Viceroy
- Style: His Honour the Honourable
- Residence: Government House, Charlottetown
- Appointer: The governor general on the advice of the prime minister
- Term length: At the governor general's pleasure
- Formation: 1 July 1873
- First holder: Sir William Cleaver Francis Robinson
- Website: www.lgpei.ca

The lieutenant governor of Prince Edward Island (/lɛfˈtɛnənt/) is the representative in Prince Edward Island of the monarch, who operates distinctly within the province but is also shared equally with the ten other jurisdictions of Canada. The lieutenant governor of Prince Edward Island is appointed in the same manner as the other provincial viceroys in Canada and is similarly tasked with carrying out most of the monarch's constitutional and ceremonial duties.

The present lieutenant governor of Prince Edward Island is Wassim Salamoun, who assumed the role on 17 October 2024. He is the first lieutenant governor in the history of the province who is immigrant born and not of European ancestry .

== Role and presence ==
The lieutenant governor of Prince Edward Island is vested with a number of governmental duties and is also expected to undertake various ceremonial roles. For instance, the lieutenant governor acts as patron, honorary president, or an honorary member of certain Prince Edward Island institutions, such as the Prince Edward Island Council of the Arts, the Royal Commonwealth Society of Prince Edward Island, and the Canadian Cancer Society (Prince Edward Island division). Also, The viceroy, him or herself a member and Chancellor of the order, will induct deserving individuals into the Order of Prince Edward Island and, upon installation, automatically becomes a Knight or Dame of Justice and the Vice-Prior in Prince Edward Island of the Most Venerable Order of the Hospital of Saint John of Jerusalem. The viceroy further presents numerous other provincial honours and decorations, as well as various awards that are named for and presented by the lieutenant governor. These honours are presented at official ceremonies, which count amongst hundreds of other engagements the lieutenant governor partakes in each year, either as host or guest of honour; the lieutenant governor of Prince Edward Island undertook an average of 350 engagements in both 2006 and 2007.

At these events, the lieutenant governor's presence is marked by the lieutenant governor's standard, consisting of a blue field bearing the escutcheon of the Arms of His Majesty in Right of Prince Edward Island surmounted by a crown and surrounded by ten gold maple leaves, symbolizing the ten provinces of Canada. Within Prince Edward Island, the lieutenant governor also follows only the sovereign in the province's order of precedence, preceding even other members of the Canadian Royal Family and the King's federal representative.

== History ==
Standard of the lieutenant governor of Prince Edward Island from 1905 to 1981

Standard of the lieutenant governor of Prince Edward Island from 1878 to 1905

The lieutenant governor of Prince Edward Island came into being in 1786, when the government of William Pitt adopted the idea that Prince Edward Island (then St. John's Island), along with New Brunswick, Nova Scotia, and Quebec, should have as their respective governors a single individual. The earlier post of governor of St. John's Island thus came to be occupied by the overreaching authority of the governor-in-chief, who was represented in the colony by a lieutenant. The modern incarnation of the office, however, was established in 1873, upon Prince Edward Island's entry into Confederation. Since that date, 27 lieutenant governors have served the province, amongst whom were notable firsts, such as Marion Reid – the first female lieutenant governor of the province – and Joseph Alphonsus Bernard – the first lieutenant governor of Acadian ancestry. The shortest mandate by a lieutenant governor of Prince Edward Island was William Cleaver Francis Robinson, from 1 July 1873 to 4 July 1874, while the longest was Thomas William Lemuel Prowse, from 4 October 1950 to 31 March 1958.

== See also ==
- Monarchy in the Canadian provinces
- Government of Prince Edward Island
- Lieutenant Governors of Canada
