= List of Prince Edward Island by-elections =

The list of Prince Edward Island by-elections includes every by-election held in the Canadian province of Prince Edward Island since 1873. By-elections occur whenever there is a vacancy in the Legislative Assembly, although an imminent general election may allow the vacancy to remain until the dissolution of the legislative assembly. Until 1932 incumbent members were required to recontest their seats upon being appointed to Cabinet. Nearly all of these Ministerial by-elections were uncontested.

== 67th General Assembly of Prince Edward Island 2023–present ==
By-election	Date	Incumbent	Party	Winner	Party	Cause	Retained
Cornwall-Meadowbank	July 13, 2026	Mark McLane	Progressive Conservative	Tayte Willows	Green	Death	No
Georgetown-Pownal	December 8, 2025	Steven Myers	Progressive Conservative	Brendan Curran	Progressive Conservative	Resignation	Yes
Brackley-Hunter River	August 12, 2025	Dennis King	Progressive Conservative	Kent Dollar	Progressive Conservative	Resignation	Yes
Charlottetown-Hillsborough Park	August 12, 2025	Natalie Jameson	Progressive Conservative	Carolyn Simpson	Liberal	Resigned to run for Charlottetown seat, in the 2025 federal election, defeated.	No
Borden-Kinkora	February 7, 2024	Jamie Fox	Progressive Conservative	Matt MacFarlane	Green	Resigned to run for Malpeque seat, in the 2025 federal election, defeated.	No

== 66th General Assembly of Prince Edward Island 2019–2023 ==
By-election	Date	Incumbent	Party	Winner	Party	Cause	Retained
Cornwall-Meadowbank	November 15, 2021	Heath MacDonald	Liberal	Mark McLane	Progressive Conservative	Resignation	No
Charlottetown-Winsloe	November 2, 2020	Robert Mitchell	Liberal	Zack Bell	Progressive Conservative	Resignation	No

== 65th General Assembly of Prince Edward Island 2015–2019 ==
By-election	Date	Incumbent	Party	Winner	Party	Cause	Retained
Charlottetown-Parkdale	November 27, 2017	Doug Currie	Liberal	Hannah Bell	Green	Resignation	No
Summerside-Wilmot	October 17, 2016	Janice Sherry	Liberal	Chris Palmer	Liberal	Resignation	Yes

== 64th General Assembly of Prince Edward Island 2011–2015 ==
no by-elections

== 63rd General Assembly of Prince Edward Island 2007–2011 ==
By-election	Date	Incumbent	Party	Winner	Party	Cause	Retained
Belfast-Murray River	October 15, 2007	Pat Binns	Progressive Conservative	Charlie McGeoghegan	Liberal	Resignation, Appointed Ambassador to Ireland	No

== 62nd General Assembly of Prince Edward Island 2003–2007 ==
By-election	Date	Incumbent	Party	Winner	Party	Cause	Retained
Morell-Fortune Bay	March 20, 2006	Kevin MacAdam	Progressive Conservative	Olive Crane	Progressive Conservative	Resignation	Yes

== 61st General Assembly of Prince Edward Island 2000–2003 ==
By-election	Date	Incumbent	Party	Winner	Party	Cause	Retained
Morell-Fortune Bay	February 26, 2001	Kevin MacAdam	Progressive Conservative	Kevin MacAdam	Progressive Conservative	Resignation to contest the 2000 Federal Election	Yes

== 60th General Assembly of Prince Edward Island 1996–2000 ==
By-election	Date	Incumbent	Party	Winner	Party	Cause	Retained
Charlottetown-Kings Square	November 17, 1997	Wayne Cheverie	Liberal	Richard Brown	Liberal	Resignation upon appointment as Chairman for the Prince Edward Island Regulatory and Appeals Commission.	Yes

== 59th General Assembly of Prince Edward Island 1993–1996 ==
no by-elections

== 58th General Assembly of Prince Edward Island 1989–1993 ==
By-election	Date	Incumbent	Party	Winner	Party	Cause	Retained
1st Kings Assemblyman	March 18, 1991	Johnny Young	Liberal	Ross Young	Liberal	Death	Yes

== 57th General Assembly of Prince Edward Island 1986–1989 ==
By-election	Date	Incumbent	Party	Winner	Party	Cause	Retained
5th Kings Assemblyman	July 11, 1988	Arthur J. MacDonald	Liberal	Rose Marie MacDonald	Liberal	Appointed to the Workmen's Compensation Board	Yes
5th Prince Councillor	September 14, 1987	Peter Pope	Progressive Conservative	Nancy Guptill	Liberal	Resignation	No
5th Prince Assemblyman	November 10, 1986	George McMahon	Progressive Conservative	Andy Walker	Progressive Conservative	Appointed to the provincial Supreme Court	Yes

== 56th General Assembly of Prince Edward Island 1982–1986 ==
By-election	Date	Incumbent	Party	Winner	Party	Cause	Retained
2nd Queens Councillor	December 2, 1985	Lloyd MacPhail	Progressive Conservative	Ron MacKinley	Liberal	Appointed Lieutenant Governor	No
4th Prince Assemblyman	December 2, 1985	William MacDougall	Progressive Conservative	Stavert Huestis	Liberal	Resignation	No
4th Kings Assemblyman	November 26, 1984	Pat Binns	Progressive Conservative	Stanley Bruce	Liberal	Resignation to contest the 1984 Federal Election	No

== 55th General Assembly of Prince Edward Island 1979–1982 ==
By-election	Date	Incumbent	Party	Winner	Party	Cause	Retained
3rd Queens Assemblyman	July 13, 1981	Bennett Campbell	Liberal	Joey Fraser	Progressive Conservative	Resignation to contest a Federal by-election	No
2nd Prince Assemblyman	February 2, 1981	George Henderson	Liberal	Keith Milligan	Liberal	Resignation to contest the 1980 Federal Election	Yes

== 54th General Assembly of Prince Edward Island 1978–1979 ==
no by-elections

== 53rd General Assembly of Prince Edward Island 1974–1978 ==
By-election	Date	Incumbent	Party	Winner	Party	Cause	Retained
1st Kings Councillor	November 8, 1976	Melvin McQuaid	Progressive Conservative	James Bernard Fay	Liberal	Appointed to the provincial Supreme Court	No
4th Queens Assemblyman	November 8, 1976	Vernon MacIntyre	Progressive Conservative	Angus MacLean	Progressive Conservative	Death	Yes
5th Prince Assemblyman	November 8, 1976	Earle Hickey	Liberal	George McMahon	Progressive Conservative	Resignation	No
2nd Prince Councillor	November 8, 1976	Joshua MacArthur	Liberal	George Dewar	Progressive Conservative	Resignation (ill-health)	No
3rd Prince Assemblyman	November 3, 1975	William Gallant	Liberal	Léonce Bernard	Liberal	Resignation	Yes
5th Queens Assemblyman	February 17, 1975	Gordon Lockhart Bennett	Liberal	James Lee	Progressive Conservative	Appointed Lieutenant Governor	No

== 52nd General Assembly of Prince Edward Island 1970–1974 ==
By-election	Date	Incumbent	Party	Winner	Party	Cause	Retained
2nd Queens Assemblyman	December 4, 1972	Sinclair Cutcliffe	Liberal	Bennett Carr	Progressive Conservative	Resignation to contest the 1972 Federal Election	No
4th Kings Assemblyman	December 4, 1972	Lorne Bonnell	Liberal	John Bonnell	Liberal	Appointed to the Senate	Yes
1st Kings Councillor	December 4, 1972	Daniel J. MacDonald	Liberal	Melvin McQuaid	Progressive Conservative	Resignation to contest the 1972 Federal Election	No
5th Queens Councillor	November 23, 1970	Elmer Blanchard	Liberal	Peter McNeill	Liberal	Death	Yes

== 51st General Assembly of Prince Edward Island 1966–1970 ==
no by-elections

== 50th General Assembly of Prince Edward Island 1962–1966 ==
By-election	Date	Incumbent	Party	Winner	Party	Cause	Retained
5th Prince Councillor	February 9, 1965	Lorne Monkley	Progressive Conservative	Alexander Campbell	Liberal	Resignation to contest the 1963 Federal Election	No
1st Kings Assemblyman	February 9, 1965	John R. McLean	Progressive Conservative	William Acorn	Liberal	Death	No

== 49th General Assembly of Prince Edward Island 1959–1962 ==
By-election	Date	Incumbent	Party	Winner	Party	Cause	Retained
5th Kings Councillor	July 17, 1961	George Saville	Liberal	George J. Ferguson	Liberal	Death	Yes
2nd Queens Councillor	July 17, 1961	Reginald Bell	Progressive Conservative	Lloyd MacPhail	Progressive Conservative	Resignation upon appointment to the provincial Supreme Court	Yes

== 48th General Assembly of Prince Edward Island 1955–1959 ==
By-election	Date	Incumbent	Party	Winner	Party	Cause	Retained
1st Queens Assemblyman	July 4, 1957	W. F. Alan Stewart	Liberal	Frank Myers	Progressive Conservative	Death	No

== 47th General Assembly of Prince Edward Island 1951–1955 ==
By-election	Date	Incumbent	Party	Winner	Party	Cause	Retained
3rd Prince Assemblyman	November 29, 1954	J. Wilfred Arsenault	Liberal	Augustin Gallant	Liberal	Resignation	Yes
4th Queens Councillor	September 10, 1953	John Walter Jones	Liberal	Harold P. Smith	Liberal	Appointed to the Senate	Yes

== 46th General Assembly of Prince Edward Island 1947–1951 ==
By-election	Date	Incumbent	Party	Winner	Party	Cause	Retained
2nd Kings Assemblyman	December 4, 1950	Harry Cox	Liberal	Harvey Douglas	Liberal	Resignation	Yes
2nd Prince Assemblyman	August 1, 1949†	George Hilton Barbour	Liberal	Walter Darby	Liberal	Appointed to the Senate	Yes
1st Kings Councillor	July 18, 1949	Thomas Joseph Kickham	Liberal	Brenton St. John	Liberal	Resignation to contest the 1949 Federal Election	Yes
4th Kings Assemblyman	July 4, 1949†	John A. Campbell	Liberal	Daniel A. MacRae	Liberal	Resignation	Yes
4th Prince Councillor	July 4, 1949†	Horace Wright	Liberal	John George MacKay	Liberal	Resignation	Yes

† Won by acclamation

== 45th General Assembly of Prince Edward Island 1943–1947 ==
By-election	Date	Incumbent	Party	Winner	Party	Cause	Retained
5th Prince Assemblyman	November 26, 1946	Daniel MacNeill	Progressive Conservative	Francis MacNeill	Progressive Conservative	Death	Yes
2nd Prince Councillor	September 17, 1946	William H. Dennis	Liberal	Forrest Phillips	Liberal	Death	Yes
5th Prince Councillor	December 19, 1945	Ernest Strong	Progressive Conservative	Morley Bell	Liberal	Resignation to contest the 1945 Federal Election	No
1st Prince Assemblyman	December 19, 1945	Joseph Alphonsus Bernard	Liberal	Clarence Morrissey	Progressive Conservative	Appointed Lieutenant Governor	No
3rd Kings Councillor	June 4, 1945	Francis MacPhee	Progressive Conservative	John Augustine Macdonald	Progressive Conservative	Resignation to contest the 1945 Federal Election	Yes
3rd Queens Councillor	July 10, 1944†	Mark MacGuigan	Liberal	Eugene Cullen	Liberal	Appointed to provincial Supreme Court	Yes

† Won by acclamation

== 44th General Assembly of Prince Edward Island 1939–1943 ==
By-election	Date	Incumbent	Party	Winner	Party	Cause	Retained
2nd Queens Councillor	November 7, 1940	Bradford William LePage	Liberal	Alexander Wallace Matheson	Liberal	Appointed Lieutenant Governor	Yes
2nd Queens Assemblyman	November 7, 1940	Angus McPhee	Liberal	George Kitson	Liberal	Death	Yes
1st Kings Assemblyman	February 8, 1940	Herbert H. Acorn	Liberal	John R. McLean	Conservative	Death	No

== 43rd General Assembly of Prince Edward Island 1935–1939 ==
By-election	Date	Incumbent	Party	Winner	Party	Cause	Retained
4th Prince Councillor	February 29, 1936	Walter Lea	Liberal	Horace Wright	Liberal	Death	Yes

== 42nd General Assembly of Prince Edward Island 1931–1935 ==
By-election	Date	Incumbent	Party	Winner	Party	Cause	Retained
5th Prince Assemblyman	October 12, 1932	Leonard M. MacNeill	Conservative	John F. MacNeill	Liberal	Death	No
5th Prince Assemblyman	September 16, 1931†	Leonard M. MacNeill	Conservative	Leonard M. MacNeill	Conservative	Sought reelection upon appointment as Minister of Public Works and Highways	Yes
2nd Prince Assemblyman	September 16, 1931†	Shelton Sharp	Conservative	Shelton Sharp	Conservative	Sought reelection upon appointment as Minister of Agriculture and Provincial Secretary-Treasurer	Yes
Charlottetown Common & Royalty Councillor	September 16, 1931†	William J. P. MacMillan	Conservative	William J. P. MacMillan	Conservative	Sought reelection upon appointment as Minister of Education and Public Health	Yes
5th Kings Councillor	September 16, 1931†	James David Stewart	Conservative	James David Stewart	Conservative	Sought reelection upon appointment as Premier and Attorney and Advocate General	Yes

† Won by acclamation

== 41st General Assembly of Prince Edward Island 1927–1931 ==
By-election	Date	Incumbent	Party	Winner	Party	Cause	Retained
2nd Prince Assemblyman	October 21, 1930	Albert Charles Saunders	Liberal	Shelton Sharp	Conservative	Appointed to provincial Supreme Court	No
4th Queens Councillor	August 16, 1928	George S. Inman	Liberal	Callum J. Bruce	Liberal	Resignation	Yes
4th Prince Councillor	September 1, 1927†	Walter Lea	Liberal	Walter Lea	Liberal	Sought reelection upon appointment as Minister of Agriculture and Provincial Secretary-Treasurer	Yes
2nd Prince Assemblyman	September 1, 1927†	Albert Charles Saunders	Liberal	Albert Charles Saunders	Liberal	Sought reelection upon appointment as Premier and Attorney and Advocate General	Yes
2nd Kings Councillor	September 1, 1927†	James P. McIntyre	Liberal	James P. McIntyre	Liberal	Sought reelection upon appointment as Minister of Public Works	Yes

† Won by acclamation

== 40th General Assembly of Prince Edward Island 1923–1927 ==
By-election	Date	Incumbent	Party	Winner	Party	Cause	Retained
4th Kings Councillor	January 14, 1926	Albert Prowse	Conservative	Norman MacLeod	Conservative	Death	Yes
3rd Kings Councillor	January 14, 1926	John Alexander Macdonald	Conservative	H. Frank McPhee	Conservative	Resignation to contest the 1925 Federal Election	Yes
5th Prince Councillor	January 14, 1926	Creelman McArthur	Liberal	George D. Pope	Conservative	Appointed to the Senate	No
5th Kings Councillor	September 27, 1923†	James David Stewart	Conservative	James David Stewart	Conservative	Sought reelection upon appointment as Premier and Attorney General	Yes
3rd Kings Councillor	September 27, 1923†	John Alexander Macdonald	Conservative	John Alexander Macdonald	Conservative	Sought reelection upon appointment as Commissioner of Public Works	Yes
4th Prince Councillor	September 27, 1923†	John Howard Myers	Conservative	John Howard Myers	Conservative	Sought reelection upon appointment as Provincial Secretary-Treasurer and Commissioner of Agriculture	Yes

† Won by acclamation

== 39th General Assembly of Prince Edward Island 1919–1923 ==
By-election	Date	Incumbent	Party	Winner	Party	Cause	Retained
5th Prince Assemblyman	August 30, 1922	James A. MacNeill	Conservative	John F. MacNeill	Liberal	Resignation to contest the 1921 Federal Election	No
3rd Prince Councillor	August 30, 1922	Alfred Edgar MacLean	Liberal	Thomas MacNutt	Conservative	Resignation to contest the 1921 Federal Election	No
3rd Prince Assemblyman	August 30, 1922	Aubin-Edmond Arsenault	Conservative	Adrien Arsenault	Conservative	Appointed to provincial Supreme Court	Yes
1st Prince Assemblyman	August 30, 1922	Benjamin Gallant	Liberal	Jeremiah Blanchard	Liberal	Death	Yes
4th Kings Councillor	August 30, 1922	William G. Sutherland	Liberal	Mark Bonnell	Liberal	Death	Yes
1st Queens Councillor	October 3, 1919	Cyrus Crosby	Liberal	Cyrus Crosby	Liberal	Sought reelection upon appointment as Commissioner of Public Works	Yes
3rd Kings Councillor	October 3, 1919†	James J. Johnston	Liberal	James J. Johnston	Liberal	Sought reelection upon appointment as Attorney General	Yes
4th Prince Councillor	October 3, 1919†	Walter Lea	Liberal	Walter Lea	Liberal	Sought reelection upon appointment as Provincial Secretary-Treasurer and Commissioner of Agriculture	Yes
4th Prince Assemblyman	October 3, 1919†	John Howatt Bell	Liberal	John Howatt Bell	Liberal	Sought reelection upon appointment as Premier	Yes

† Won by acclamation

== 38th General Assembly of Prince Edward Island 1915–1919 ==
By-election	Date	Incumbent	Party	Winner	Party	Cause	Retained
2nd Kings Councillor	November 7, 1917	James McInnis	Liberal	R. J. MacDonald	Conservative	Death	No
5th Kings Councillor	July 25, 1917	John Alexander Mathieson	Conservative	James David Stewart	Conservative	Appointed Chief Justice of Prince Edward Island	Yes
3rd Prince Assemblyman	July 25, 1917	Aubin-Edmond Arsenault	Conservative	Aubin-Edmond Arsenault	Conservative	Sought re-election upon appointment as Premier and Attorney General	Yes
1st Kings Councillor	January 5, 1916	John McLean	Conservative	Harry D. McLean	Conservative	Appointed to the Senate	Yes

== 37th General Assembly of Prince Edward Island 1912–1915 ==
no by-elections

== 36th General Assembly of Prince Edward Island 1908–1911 ==
By-election	Date	Incumbent	Party	Winner	Party	Cause	Retained
4th Queens Councillor	November 15, 1911	Francis Haszard	Liberal	Alexander Macphail	Independent Conservative	Appointed Master of the Rolls	No
3rd Queens Assemblyman	November 15, 1911	Herbert James Palmer	Liberal	George F. Dewar	Conservative	Sought reelection upon appointment as Premier and Attorney General	No
2nd Queens Assemblyman	February 8, 1911	William Laird	Liberal	George Washington McPhee	Liberal	Resignation	Yes
3rd Kings Assemblyman	August 10, 1910	Walter Morson	Conservative	John A. Dewar	Conservative	Appointed Deputy Prothonotary of the Supreme Court	Yes
4th Prince Councillor	August 6, 1909	Joseph Read	Liberal	Michael C. Delaney	Conservative	Resignation to recontest over election petition	No
1st Queens Assemblyman	July 7, 1909	Matthew Smith	Liberal	Cyrus Crosby	Liberal	Death	Yes
2nd Prince Assemblyman	December 1908†	John Richards	Liberal	John Richards	Liberal	Sought re-election upon appointment as Provincial Secretary-Treasurer and Commissioner of Agriculture	Yes

† Won by acclamation

== 35th General Assembly of Prince Edward Island 1904–1908 ==
By-election	Date	Incumbent	Party		Winner	Party	Cause	Retained
1st Queens Councillor	December 19, 1906	George Simpson		Liberal	Murdock Kennedy	Conservative	Death	No
3rd Queens Councillor	November 22, 1905	James Cummiskey		Liberal	James Cummiskey	Liberal	Void Election	Yes
2nd Kings Assemblyman	March 28, 1905†	Vacant	N/A	N/A	Arthur Peters	Liberal	No return made due to a tie between Arthur Peters and Harvey David McEwen	N/A
4th Prince Assemblyman	February 23, 1905	Samuel E. Reid		Liberal	Samuel E. Reid	Liberal	Sought reelection upon appointment as Provincial Secretary-Treasurer and Commissioner of Agriculture	Yes

† Won by acclamation

== 34th General Assembly of Prince Edward Island 1900–1904 ==
By-election	Date	Incumbent	Party	Winner	Party	Cause	Retained
3rd Kings Councillor	March 29, 1904	James E. MacDonald	Conservative	Patrick Kelly	Conservative	Death	Yes
2nd Kings Councillor	March 16, 1904	Anthony McLaughlin	Liberal	James McInnis	Liberal	Appointed a judge	Yes
Charlottetown Common & Royalty Assemblyman	March 16, 1904	John Whear	Liberal	James Warburton	Liberal	Resignation	Yes
3rd Kings Assemblyman	December 9, 1902	Malcolm MacDonald	Liberal	Walter Morson	Conservative	Death	No
2nd Queens Councillor	December 9, 1902	Donald Farquharson	Liberal	Dougald Currie	Conservative	Resignation to contest a federal by-election	No
1st Prince Councillor	January 30, 1901	Benjamin Rogers	Liberal	Benjamin Rogers	Liberal	Sought reelection upon appointment as Provincial Secretary-Treasurer and Commissioner of Agriculture	Yes
3rd Queens Councillor	January 30, 1901†	James Cummiskey	Liberal	James Cummiskey	Liberal	Sought reelection upon appointment as Commissioner of Public Works	Yes
2nd Kings Assemblyman	January 30, 1901†	Arthur Peters	Liberal	Arthur Peters	Liberal	Sought reelection upon appointment as Attorney General	Yes

† Won by acclamation

== 33rd General Assembly of Prince Edward Island 1897–1900 ==
By-election	Date	Incumbent	Party	Winner	Party	Cause	Retained
2nd Queens Assemblyman	July 11, 1900	Joseph Wise	Liberal	Albert E. Douglas	Liberal	Resignation	Yes
4th Queens Assemblyman	December 13, 1899	Hector C. McDonald	Liberal	Angus A. MacLean	Conservative	Appointed a county judge	No
4th Kings Assemblyman	December 13, 1899	Donald Alexander MacKinnon	Liberal	Albert Prowse	Conservative	Sought reelection upon appointment as Attorney General	No
1st Prince Assemblyman	July 25, 1899	Meddie Gallant	Liberal	Henry Pineau	Conservative	Void By-Election	No
5th Prince Assemblyman	February 2, 1899	Alfred Lefurgey	Liberal	Gilbert DesRoches	Conservative	Resignation to contest a federal by-election	No
4th Prince Assemblyman	February 2, 1899	John Howatt Bell	Liberal	Samuel E. Reid	Liberal	Resignation to contest a federal by-election	Yes
1st Queens Assemblyman	August 31, 1898	Alexander Warburton	Liberal	William Campbell	Conservative	Appointed a judge	No
1st Prince Assemblyman	July 20, 1898	Edward Hackett	Conservative	Meddie Gallant	Liberal	Resignation to contest a federal by-election	No
4th Queens Assemblyman	November 17, 1897†	Hector C. McDonald	Liberal	Hector C. McDonald	Liberal	Sought reelection upon appointment as Attorney General	Yes

† Won by acclamation

== 32nd General Assembly of Prince Edward Island 1893–1897 ==
By-election	Date	Incumbent	Party	Winner	Party	Cause	Retained
4th Prince Councillor	September 29, 1896	Alexander Laird	Liberal	William Campbell	Conservative	Death	No
3rd Prince Assemblyman	July 25, 1895	Joseph-Octave Arsenault	Conservative	Stephen Gallant	Liberal	Appointed to the Senate	No

== 31st General Assembly of Prince Edward Island 1890–1893 ==
By-election	Date	Incumbent	Party	Winner	Party	Cause	Retained
1st Queens	May 29, 1891	James Miller Sutherland	Liberal	Alexander Warburton	Liberal	Resignation	Yes
1st Kings	May 14, 1891†	James R. McLean	Liberal	James R. McLean	Liberal	Sought reelection upon appointment as Commissioner of Public Works	Yes
3rd Queens	May 14, 1891†	Frederick Peters	Liberal	Frederick Peters	Liberal	Sought reelection upon appointment as Premier and Attorney General	Yes
5th Prince	May 14, 1891†	Angus McMillan	Liberal	Angus McMillan	Liberal	Sought reelection upon appointment as Provincial Secretary-Treasurer and Commissioner of Crown and Public Lands	Yes
1st Kings	April 9, 1891	John McLean	Conservative	Alexander D. Robertson	Liberal	Resignation to contest the 1891 Federal Election	No
Charlottetown Common & Royalty	April 9, 1891	Patrick Blake	Conservative	John Theophilus Jenkins	Independent Conservative	Resignation to contest the 1891 Federal Election	No
3rd Queens	April 9, 1891	Donald Ferguson	Conservative	James Cummiskey	Liberal	Resignation to contest the 1891 Federal Election	No
2nd Prince	April 9, 1891†	John Yeo	Liberal	Alfred McWilliams	Liberal	Resignation to contest the 1891 Federal Election	Yes
3rd Kings	November 1890†	Hugh Lord McDonald	Conservative	James E. MacDonald	Conservative	Death	Yes

† Won by acclamation

== 30th General Assembly of Prince Edward Island 1886–1890 ==
By-election	Date	Incumbent	Party	Winner	Party	Cause	Retained
4th Queens	March 15, 1888	Donald Charles Martin	Liberal	Alexander Warburton	Conservative	Death	No
1st Prince	March 15, 1888	Stanislaus Francis Perry	Liberal	Bernard Donald McLellan	Liberal	Resignation to contest the 1887 Federal Election	Yes
3rd Queens	March 5, 1887	Donald Ferguson	Conservative	Donald Ferguson	Conservative	Resignation to contest the 1887 Federal Election	Yes
5th Prince	March 5, 1887†	John Lefurgey	Conservative	John Lefurgey	Conservative	Resignation to contest the 1887 Federal Election	Yes
4th Prince	February 4, 1887	George Bentley	Conservative	George Bentley	Conservative	Sought reelection upon appointment as Commissioner of Public Works	Yes

† Won by acclamation

== 29th General Assembly of Prince Edward Island 1882–1886 ==
By-election	Date	Incumbent	Party	Winner	Party	Cause	Retained
4th Queens	February 20, 1884	Angus D. MacMillan	Liberal	Alexander Martin	Conservative	Death	No
1st Prince	April 17, 1883	John Archibald Matheson	Liberal	John Archibald Matheson	Liberal	Void Election	Yes
4th Kings	July 31, 1882	James Edwin Robertson	Liberal	Samuel Prowse	Conservative	Resignation upon winning a seat in the 1882 Federal Election	No

== 28th General Assembly of Prince Edward Island 1879–1882 ==
By-election	Date	Incumbent	Party	Winner	Party	Cause	Retained
1st Queens	March 1880†	William Campbell	Conservative	William Campbell	Conservative	Sought reelection upon appointment as Commissioner of Public Works	Yes
4th Queens	October 21, 1879	Donald Montgomery	Conservative	Duncan Crawford	Conservative	Appointed Chief Superintendent of Education	Yes
1st Prince	1879	Nicholas Conroy	Liberal	Stanislaus Francis Perry	Liberal	Resignation	Yes
3rd Queens	May 19, 1879	Francis Kelly	Conservative	Donald A. MacDonald	Conservative	Death	Yes

† Won by acclamation

== 27th General Assembly of Prince Edward Island 1876–1879 ==
By-election	Date	Incumbent	Party	Winner	Party	Cause	Retained
4th Queens	November 7, 1878†	John F. Robertson	Liberal	James Nicholson	Conservative	Resignation	No
1st Prince	November 1878	Edward Hackett	Conservative	Peter Gavin	Conservative	Resignation to contest the 1878 Federal Election	Yes
4th Queens	September 1878	William Welsh	Liberal	Donald Montgomery	Conservative	Resignation	No
3rd Kings	June 1878†	John Scrimgeour	Liberal	Donald Ferguson	Conservative	Resignation	No
Charlottetown Common & Royalty	September 28, 1876	Louis Henry Davies	Liberal	Louis Henry Davies	Liberal	Sought reelection upon appointment as Premier and Attorney General	Yes
Charlottetown Common & Royalty	September 28, 1876	George Wastie Deblois	Conservative	George Wastie Deblois	Conservative	Sought reelection upon appointment as Provincial Secretary-Treasurer	Yes
1st Queens	September 21, 1876†	William Dunbar Stewart	Liberal	William Dunbar Stewart	Liberal	Sought reelection upon appointment as Commissioner of Public Works	Yes

† Won by acclamation

== 26th General Assembly of Prince Edward Island 1873–1876 ==
By-election	Date	Incumbent	Party	Winner	Party	Cause	Retained
1st Kings	December 16, 1875	Emmanuel McEachern	Conservative	Lauchlin MacDonald	Liberal	Death	No
3rd Queens	November 1875	Francis Kelly	Conservative	Francis Kelly	Conservative	Sought reelection upon appointment as Commissioner of Crown Lands	Yes
1st Prince	April 17, 1875	Stanislaus Francis Perry	Liberal	Francis Gallant	Conservative	Resignation upon winning a seat in the 1874 Federal Election	No
5th Prince	February 11, 1875†	Thomas Kelly	Conservative	James Colledge Pope	Conservative	Resignation	Yes
1st Queens	October 14, 1873	Peter Sinclair	Liberal	William Campbell	Conservative	Resignation to contest a federal by-election upon Confederation	No
Charlottetown Common & Royalty	October 14, 1873	James Colledge Pope	Conservative	Frederick de St Croix Brecken	Conservative	Resignation to contest federal by-elections upon Confederation	Yes
Charlottetown Common & Royalty	October 14, 1873	Frederick de St Croix Brecken	Conservative	John Theophilus Jenkins	Conservative	Resignation to contest federal by-elections upon Confederation	Yes
2nd Prince	October 1873	James Yeo	Liberal	James William Richards	Conservative	Resignation to contest a federal by-election upon Confederation	No
1st Prince	October 1873†	George William Howlan	Liberal	Nicholas Conroy	Liberal	Resignation to contest a federal by-election upon Confederation	Yes
4th Queens	September 1873	David Laird	Liberal	William Welsh	Liberal	Resignation to contest a federal by-election upon Confederation	Yes
3rd Kings	September 1873	Augustine Colin Macdonald	Conservative	James E. MacDonald	Conservative	Resignation to contest a federal by-election upon Confederation	Yes
2nd Kings	April 1873†	William Wilfred Sullivan	Conservative	William Wilfred Sullivan	Conservative	Sought reelection upon appointment as Solicitor General	Yes
Georgetown Common & Royalty	April 1873†	Thomas Heath Haviland	Conservative	Thomas Heath Haviland	Conservative	Sought reelection upon appointment as Colonial Secretary	Yes
Charlottetown Common & Royalty	April 1873†	Frederick de St Croix Brecken	Conservative	Frederick de St Croix Brecken	Conservative	Sought reelection upon appointment as Attorney General	Yes

† Won by acclamation

== See also ==
- List of federal by-elections in Canada
