= 27th General Assembly of Prince Edward Island =

Legislature, 1877–1879

The 27th General Assembly of Prince Edward Island was in existence from March 15, 1877, to March 12, 1879. It was elected in the 1876 general election.

The first government formed was a Protestant coalition led by Louis Henry Davies. After the coalition failed, the Conservative Party led by William Wilfred Sullivan formed a government.

There were three sessions of the 27th General Assembly:

Session	Start	End
1st	March 15, 1877	April 18, 1877
2nd	March 14, 1878	April 18, 1878
3rd	February 27, 1879	March 11, 1879

Henry Beer was elected speaker.

== Members ==
Electoral district	Member	Party	First elected
1st Kings	James R. McLean	Liberal	1873
1st Kings	Lauchlin MacDonald	Liberal	1875
2nd Kings	William W. Sullivan	Conservative	1873
2nd Kings	Hilary McIsaac	Conservative	1873
3rd Kings	James E. MacDonald	Conservative	1873
3rd Kings	John G. Scrimgeour	Liberal	1876
3rd Kings	Donald Ferguson	Conservative	1878
4th Kings	James Robertson	Liberal	1876
4th Kings	Samuel Prowse	Conservative	1876
5th Kings	Daniel Gordon	Conservative	1876
5th Kings	Lewis J. Westaway	Liberal	1876
1st Prince	Nicholas Conroy	Liberal	1873
1st Prince	Edward Hackett	Independent	1876
1st Prince	Peter Gavin (1878)	Conservative	1878
2nd Prince	John Yeo	Conservative	1873
2nd Prince	James W. Richards	Conservative	1873
3rd Prince	Joseph O. Arsenault	Conservative	1873
3rd Prince	John A. MacDonald	Conservative	1873
4th Prince	John R. Calhoun	Liberal	1876
4th Prince	William C. Lea	Liberal	1876
5th Prince	Angus McMillan	Liberal	1876
5th Prince	John Lefurgey	Conservative	1873
1st Queens	William Dunbar Stewart	Conservative	1873
1st Queens	William Campbell	Conservative	1873
2nd Queens	Donald McKay	Conservative	1876
2nd Queens	Donald Farquharson	Liberal	1876
3rd Queens	Francis Kelly	Conservative	1873
3rd Queens	Henry Beer	Liberal	1873
4th Queens	William Welsh	Liberal	1873
4th Queens	John F. Robertson	Independent	1876
4th Queens	Donald Montgomery (1878)	Independent	1878
4th Queens	James Nicholson (1878)	Conservative	1878
5th Queens	Louis H. Davies	Liberal	1873
5th Queens	George W. Deblois	Conservative	1876
