= 28th General Assembly of Prince Edward Island =

The 28th General Assembly of Prince Edward Island was in existence from April 24, 1879, to April 15, 1882. It was elected in the 1879 general election.

The majority party was the Conservative Party led by William Wilfred Sullivan.

There were four sessions of the 28th General Assembly:

Session	Start	End
1st	April 24, 1879	June 7, 1879
2nd	March 4, 1880	April 26, 1880
3rd	March 1, 1881	April 5, 1881
4th	March 8, 1882	April 8, 1882

The speaker was John A. MacDonald.

== Members ==
Electoral district	Member	Party	First elected / previously elected
1st Kings	Lauchlin MacDonald	Liberal	1875
1st Kings	John C. Underhay	Liberal	1876
2nd Kings	William W. Sullivan	Conservative	1873
2nd Kings	William Hooper	Independent	1876
3rd Kings	James E. MacDonald	Conservative	1876
3rd Kings	Donald Ferguson	Conservative	1878
4th Kings	Samuel Prowse	Conservative	1876
4th Kings	W.A. Poole	Conservative	1879
5th Kings	Daniel Gordon	Conservative	1876
5th Kings	Archibald J. MacDonald	Independent	1873, 1879
1st Prince	Peter Gavin	Conservative	1878
1st Prince	Nicholas Conroy	Liberal	1873
1st Prince	S.F. Perry (1879)	Liberal	1879
2nd Prince	John Yeo	Conservative	1873
2nd Prince	James W. Richards	Conservative	1873
3rd Prince	John A. MacDonald	Conservative	1873
3rd Prince	Joseph O. Arsenault	Conservative	1873
4th Prince	George W. Bentley	Conservative	1879
4th Prince	A.E.C. Holland	Conservative	1873, 1879
5th Prince	John Lefurgey	Conservative	1873
5th Prince	Angus McMillan	Liberal	1876
1st Queens	William Campbell	Conservative	1873
1st Queens	Donald Cameron	Conservative	1879
2nd Queens	Donald McKay	Conservative	1876
2nd Queens	Donald Farquharson	Liberal	1876
3rd Queens	Francis Kelly	Conservative	1873
3rd Queens	Donald A. MacDonald (1879)	Conservative	1879
3rd Queens	Robert Shaw	Conservative	1879
4th Queens	James Nicholson	Conservative	1878
4th Queens	Donald Montgomery	Independent	1878
4th Queens	Duncan Crawford (1879)	Conservative	1879
5th Queens	Neil McLeod	Conservative	1879
5th Queens	George W. Deblois	Conservative	1876
