= 26th General Assembly of Prince Edward Island =

The 26th General Assembly of Prince Edward Island was in session from March 4, 1874, to July 1, 1876. It was elected in the 1873 general election, which had been held when PEI was still a colony.

It was the first assembly after Prince Edward Island became a Canadian province.

The majority party was the Conservative Party led by Premier James Colledge Pope. After Pope resigned to run for a federal seat, Lemuel Owen became party leader and premier.

There were three sessions of the 26th General Assembly:

Session	Start	End
1st	March 4, 1874	April 28, 1874
2nd	March 18, 1875	April 27, 1875
3rd	March 16, 1876	April 29, 1876

Cornelius Howatt was elected speaker.

== Members ==
Electoral district	Member	Party	First elected
1st Kings	Emmanuel McEachern	Conservative	1873
1st Kings	Lauchlin MacDonald (1875)	Liberal	1875
1st Kings	J.R. McLean	Liberal	1873
2nd Kings	William W. Sullivan	Conservative	1873
2nd Kings	Hilary McIsaac	Conservative	1873
3rd Kings	L.C. Owen	Conservative	1873
3rd Kings	A.C. MacDonald	Independent	1873
3rd Kings	J.E. MacDonald (1873)	Conservative	1873
4th Kings	L.H. Davies	Liberal	1873
4th Kings	Manoah Rowe	Liberal	1873
5th Kings	T.H. Haviland	Independent	1873
5th Kings	A.J. MacDonald	Conservative	1873
1st Prince	G.W. Howlan	Independent	1873
1st Prince	N. Conroy (1873)	Liberal	1873
1st Prince	S.F. Perry	Liberal	1873
1st Prince	Francis Gallant (1875)	Conservative	1873
2nd Prince	John Yeo	Conservative	1873
2nd Prince	James Yeo	Independent	1873
2nd Prince	James W. Richards (1873)	Conservative	1873
3rd Prince	John A. MacDonald	Conservative	1873
3rd Prince	J.O. Arsenault	Conservative	1873
4th Prince	A.E.C. Holland	Conservative	1873
4th Prince	C. Howatt	Conservative	1873
5th Prince	John Lefurgey	Conservative	1873
5th Prince	Thomas Kelly	Conservative	1873
5th Prince	James Colledge Pope (1875)	Conservative	1875
1st Queens	P. Sinclair	Liberal	1873
1st Queens	William Campbell (1873)	Independent	1873
1st Queens	W.D. Stewart	Liberal	1873
2nd Queens	H. Callbeck	Liberal	1873
2nd Queens	W.S. McNeill	Liberal	1873
3rd Queens	H. Beer	Liberal	1873
3rd Queens	F. Kelly	Conservative	1873
4th Queens	David Laird	Independent	1873
4th Queens	William Welsh (1873)	Liberal	1873
4th Queens	Benjamin Davies	Liberal	1873
5th Queens	James Colledge Pope	Conservative	1873
5th Queens	Frederick Brecken (1873)	Conservative	1873
5th Queens	Frederick Brecken	Conservative	1873
5th Queens	John Theophilus Jenkins (1873)	Conservative	1873
