= 30th General Assembly of Prince Edward Island =

The 30th General Assembly of Prince Edward Island was in session from March 29, 1887, to January 7, 1890. The majority party was the Conservative Party led by William Wilfred Sullivan. After Sullivan resigned to serve in the province's Supreme Court, Neil McLeod became party leader and premier.

There were three sessions of the 30th General Assembly:

Session	Start	End
1st	March 29, 1887	May 7, 1887
2nd	March 22, 1888	April 28, 1888
3rd	March 14, 1889	April 17, 1889

The speaker was John A. MacDonald.

== Members ==
Electoral district	Member	Party	First elected / previously elected
1st Kings	John McLean	Conservative	1876, 1882
1st Kings	James R. McLean	Liberal	1882
2nd Kings	William W. Sullivan	Conservative	1873
2nd Kings	J.C. Underhay	Conservative	1879, 1886
3rd Kings	H.L. McDonald	Conservative	1886
3rd Kings	Cyrus Shaw	Conservative	1886
4th Kings	Samuel Prowse	Conservative	1876, 1882
4th Kings	Angus MacLeod	Liberal	1886
5th Kings	Daniel Gordon	Conservative	1876
5th Kings	Archibald J. MacDonald	Conservative	1873, 1879
1st Prince	Stanislaus F. Perry	Liberal	1879
1st Prince	Bernard McLellan (1888)	Liberal	1888
1st Prince	John A. Matheson	Liberal	1882
2nd Prince	John Yeo	Conservative	1873
2nd Prince	J. W. Richards	Conservative	1873
3rd Prince	Joseph O. Arsenault	Conservative	1873
3rd Prince	John A. MacDonald	Conservative	1873
4th Prince	George W. Bentley	Conservative	1879
4th Prince	John H. Bell	Liberal	1886
5th Prince	John Lefurgey	Conservative	1873
5th Prince	John F. Gillis	Conservative	1882
1st Queens	Peter Sinclair	Conservative	1873, 1882
1st Queens	James M. Sutherland	Conservative	1886
2nd Queens	Donald Farquharson	Liberal	1876
2nd Queens	Joseph Wise	Liberal	1886
3rd Queens	Donald Ferguson	Conservative	1878
3rd Queens	Lucius O. Kelly	Conservative	1886
4th Queens	George Forbes	Liberal	1886
4th Queens	Donald C. Martin	Liberal	1882
4th Queens	Alexander Warburton (1888)	Liberal	1888
5th Queens	Patrick Blake	Conservative	1882
5th Queens	Neil McLeod	Conservative	1879
