= 29th General Assembly of Prince Edward Island =

The 29th General Assembly of Prince Edward Island was in session from March 20, 1883, to June 5, 1886. The majority party was the Conservative Party led by William Wilfred Sullivan.

There were four sessions of the 29th General Assembly:

Session	Start	End
1st	March 20, 1883	April 27, 1883
2nd	March 6, 1884	April 17, 1884
3rd	March 11, 1885	April 11, 1885
4th	April 8, 1886	May 14, 1886

The speaker was John A. MacDonald.

== Members ==
Electoral district	Member	Party	First elected / previously elected
1st Kings	John McLean	Conservative	1876, 1882
1st Kings	James R. McLean	Liberal	1882
2nd Kings	William Hooper	Liberal	1876
2nd Kings	William W. Sullivan	Conservative	1873
3rd Kings	John McDougall	Conservative	1882
3rd Kings	Peter McLaren	Conservative	1882
4th Kings	Malcolm McFadyen	Liberal	1882
4th Kings	J.E. Robertson	Independent	1876, 1882
4th Kings	Samuel Prowse (1882)	Conservative	1876, 1882
5th Kings	Archibald J. MacDonald	Conservative	1873, 1879
5th Kings	Daniel Gordon	Conservative	1876
1st Prince	Stanislaus F. Perry	Liberal	1879
1st Prince	John A. Matheson	Liberal	1882
2nd Prince	John Yeo	Conservative	1873
2nd Prince	J. W. Richards	Conservative	1873
3rd Prince	John A. MacDonald	Conservative	1873
3rd Prince	Joseph O. Arsenault	Conservative	1873
4th Prince	George W. Bentley	Conservative	1879
4th Prince	A.E.C. Holland	Conservative	1873, 1879
5th Prince	John F. Gillis	Conservative	1882
5th Prince	John Lefurgey	Conservative	1873
1st Queens	William Campbell	Conservative	1873
1st Queens	Peter Sinclair	Conservative	1873, 1882
2nd Queens	Donald Farquharson	Liberal	1876
2nd Queens	Donald McKay	Conservative	1876
3rd Queens	Henry Beer	Liberal	1873, 1882
3rd Queens	Donald Ferguson	Conservative	1878
4th Queens	Donald C. Martin	Liberal	1882
4th Queens	A.D. MacMillan	Liberal	1882
4th Queens	Alex Martin (1884)	Conservative	1884
5th Queens	Patrick Blake	Conservative	1882
5th Queens	Neil McLeod	Conservative	1879
