= 39th General Assembly of Prince Edward Island =

The 39th General Assembly of Prince Edward Island was in session from April 6, 1920, to June 23, 1923. The Liberal Party led by John Howatt Bell formed the government.

C. Gavin Duffy was elected speaker.

There were four sessions of the 39th General Assembly:

Session	Start	End
1st	April 6, 1920	May 1, 1920
2nd	March 10, 1921	April 27, 1921
3rd	March 14, 1922	May 3, 1922
4th	March 20, 1923	May 2, 1923

== Members ==
=== Kings ===
District	Assemblyman	Party	First elected / previously elected
1st Kings	Daniel C. MacDonald	Liberal	1919
2nd Kings	Robert Cox	Liberal	1908, 1919
3rd Kings	John A. Dewar	Independent (Note: First elected as a Conservative)	1910
4th Kings	Wallace B. Butler	Liberal	1919
5th Kings	Stephen Hessian	Liberal	1919
District	Councillor	Party	First elected / previously elected
1st Kings	Harry D. McLean	Conservative	1916
2nd Kings	James P. McIntyre	Liberal	1919
3rd Kings	James J. Johnston	Liberal	1915
4th Kings	William G. Sutherland	Liberal	1919
4th Kings	Mark Bonnell (1922)	Liberal	1922
5th Kings	James David Stewart	Conservative	1917

=== Prince ===
District	Assemblyman	Party	First elected / previously elected
1st Prince	Benjamin Gallant	Liberal	1900, 1915
1st Prince	Jeremiah Blanchard (1922)	Liberal	1893, 1922
2nd Prince	Albert Charles Saunders	Liberal	1915
3rd Prince	Aubin Edmond Arsenault	Conservative	1908
3rd Prince	Adrien Arsenault (1922)	Conservative	1922
4th Prince	John Howatt Bell	Liberal	1886, 1915
5th Prince	James A. MacNeill	Conservative	1908
5th Prince	John F. MacNeill (1922)	Independent	1922
District	Councillor	Party	First elected / previously elected
1st Prince	Christopher Metherall	Liberal	1919
2nd Prince	William H. Dennis	Liberal	1915
3rd Prince	Alfred E. MacLean	Liberal	1915
3rd Prince	Thomas MacNutt (1922)	Liberal	1922
4th Prince	Walter Lea	Liberal	1915
5th Prince	Creelman McArthur	Liberal	1919

=== Queens ===
District	Assemblyman	Party	First elected / previously elected
1st Queens	Murdock Kennedy	Conservative	1906
2nd Queens	Bradford W. LePage	Liberal	1919
3rd Queens	Peter Brodie	Liberal	1919
4th Queens	James C. Irving	Liberal	1919
5th Queens	Edmund Higgs	Liberal	1919
District	Councillor	Party	First elected / previously elected
1st Queens	Cyrus Crosby	Liberal	1909, 1919
2nd Queens	George E. Hughes	Liberal	1900, (Note: 5th Queens (Councillor)) 1915
3rd Queens	David McDonald	Liberal	1915
4th Queens	Frederick J. Nash	Liberal	1919
5th Queens	Gavan Duffy	Liberal	1919
