= 40th General Assembly of Prince Edward Island =

The 40th General Assembly of Prince Edward Island was in session from March 12, 1924, to June 2, 1927. The Conservative Party led by James David Stewart formed the government.

Louis L. Jenkins was elected speaker.

There were four sessions of the 40th General Assembly:

Session	Start	End
1st	March 12, 1924	April 11, 1924
2nd	March 17, 1925	April 9, 1925
3rd	March 9, 1926	March 31, 1926
4th	March 15, 1927	April 12, 1927

== Members ==
=== Kings ===
District	Assemblyman	Party	First elected / previously elected
1st Kings	Augustine A. MacDonald	Conservative	1915, 1923
2nd Kings	Harvey D. McEwen	Conservative	1915, 1923
3rd Kings	Leslie Hunter	Conservative	1923
4th Kings	Maynard F. McDonald	Conservative	1923
5th Kings	J. Howard MacDonald	Conservative	1923
District	Councillor	Party	First elected / previously elected
1st Kings	Harry D. McLean	Conservative	1916
2nd Kings	James B. McDonald	Conservative	1923
3rd Kings	John Alexander Macdonald	Conservative	1908, 1923
3rd Kings	H. Frank McPhee (1926)	Independent	1926
4th Kings	Albert P. Prowse	Conservative	1899, 1904, 1923
4th Kings	Norman MacLeod (1926)	Conservative	1926
5th Kings	James David Stewart	Conservative	1917

=== Prince ===
District	Assemblyman	Party	First elected / previously elected
1st Prince	Jeremiah Blanchard	Liberal	1922
2nd Prince	Albert Charles Saunders	Liberal	1915
3rd Prince	Adrien Arsenault	Conservative	1922
4th Prince	Whitefield Bentley	Conservative	1923
5th Prince	James A. MacNeill	Conservative	1908, 1923
District	Councillor	Party	First elected / previously elected
1st Prince	Wilfred Tanton	Conservative	1923
2nd Prince	William H. Dennis	Liberal	1915
3rd Prince	Thomas MacNutt	Conservative	1922
4th Prince	John H. Myers	Conservative	1912, 1923
5th Prince	Creelman McArthur	Liberal	1919
5th Prince	George D. Pope(1926)	Conservative	1926

=== Queens ===
District	Assemblyman	Party	First elected / previously elected
1st Queens	Murdock Kennedy	Conservative	1906
2nd Queens	John Buntain	Conservative	1912, 1923
3rd Queens	Leonard J. Wood	Conservative	1904, 1915, 1923
4th Queens	James C. Irving	Liberal	1919
5th Queens	W. Chester S. McLure	Conservative	1923
District	Councillor	Party	First elected / previously elected
1st Queens	Alexander McNevin	Conservative	1915, 1923
2nd Queens	Louis Jenkins	Conservative	1912, 1923
3rd Queens	J. Augustine MacDonald	Conservative	1923
4th Queens	Shaw McMillan	Conservative	1923
5th Queens	William Joseph Parnell MacMillan	Conservative	1923
