= 41st General Assembly of Prince Edward Island =

Canadian General Assembly

The 41st General Assembly of Prince Edward Island was in session from March 20, 1928, to July 2, 1931. The Liberal Party led by Albert Charles Saunders formed the government. After Saunders was named a judge, Walter Lea became party leader and Premier in 1930.

David McDonald was elected speaker.

There were four sessions of the 41st General Assembly:

Session	Start	End
1st	March 20, 1928	April 27, 1928
2nd	March 19, 1929	April 19, 1929
3rd	March 11, 1930	April 10, 1930
4th	March 24, 1931	May 7, 1931

== Members ==
=== Kings ===
District	Assemblyman	Party	First elected / previously elected
1st Kings	Augustine A. MacDonald	Conservative	1915, 1923
2nd Kings	Harry Cox	Liberal	1927
3rd Kings	John Mustard	Liberal	1927
4th Kings	John A. Campbell	Liberal	1927
5th Kings	Paul A. Scully	Liberal	1927
District	Councillor	Party	First elected / previously elected
1st Kings	Harry D. McLean	Conservative	1916
2nd Kings	James P. McIntyre	Liberal	1919, 1927
3rd Kings	Thomas V. Grant	Liberal	1927
4th Kings	Walter Bruce Butler	Liberal	1919, 1927
5th Kings	James David Stewart	Conservative	1917

=== Prince ===
District	Assemblyman	Party	First elected / previously elected
1st Prince	Jeremiah Blanchard	Liberal	1922
2nd Prince	Albert Charles Saunders	Liberal	1915
2nd Prince	Shelton Sharp (1930)	Conservative	1930
3rd Prince	Adrien Arsenault	Conservative	1922
4th Prince	Horace Wright	Liberal	1927
5th Prince	John F. MacNeill	Conservative	1922, 1927
District	Councillor	Party	First elected / previously elected
1st Prince	Robert H. Gordon	Liberal	1927
2nd Prince	William H. Dennis	Liberal	1915
3rd Prince	Harry A. Darby	Liberal	1927
4th Prince	Walter Lea	Liberal	1915, 1927
5th Prince	Lucas R. Allan	Liberal	1927

=== Queens ===
District	Assemblyman	Party	First elected / previously elected
1st Queens	Peter Sinclair	Liberal	1927
2nd Queens	Angus McPhee	Liberal	1927
3rd Queens	Russell C. Clark	Liberal	1927
4th Queens	J. James Larabee	Liberal	1927
5th Queens	W. Chester S. McLure	Conservative	1923
District	Councillor	Party	First elected / previously elected
1st Queens	W. F. Alan Stewart	Liberal	1927
2nd Queens	Bradford W. LePage	Liberal	1919, 1927
3rd Queens	David McDonald	Liberal	1915, 1927
4th Queens	George S. Inman	Liberal	1927
4th Queens	Callum J. Bruce (1928)	Liberal	1928
5th Queens	William Joseph Parnell MacMillan	Conservative	1923
