= 45th General Assembly of Prince Edward Island =

The 45th General Assembly of Prince Edward Island was in session from February 15, 1944, to October 27, 1947. The Liberal Party led by John Walter Jones formed the government.

Thomas R. Cullen was elected speaker.

There were four sessions of the 45th General Assembly:

Session	Start	End
1st	February 15, 1944	March 17, 1944
2nd	March 13, 1945	April 19, 1945
3rd	February 26, 1946	March 30, 1946
4th	March 18, 1947	April 25, 1947

== Members ==
=== Kings ===
District	Assemblyman	Party	First elected / previously elected
1st Kings	Harry S. Francis	Liberal	1943
2nd Kings	Harry Cox	Liberal	1927
3rd Kings	Leslie Hunter	Progressive; Conservative	1923, 1931, 1943
4th Kings	John A. Campbell	Liberal	1927
5th Kings	William Hughes	Liberal	1935
District	Councillor	Party	First elected / previously elected
1st Kings	T. J. Kickham	Liberal	1943
2nd Kings	Thomas R. Cullen	Liberal	1943
3rd Kings	Francis MacPhee	Progressive; Conservative	1926, 1931, 1939
3rd Kings	John A. MacDonald (1945)	Progressive; Conservative	1945
4th Kings	Murdock McGowan	Progressive; Conservative	1943
5th Kings	George Saville	Liberal	1935

=== Prince ===
District	Assemblyman	Party	First elected / previously elected
1st Prince	Joseph A. Bernard	Liberal	1943
1st Prince	Clarence Morrissey (1945)	Progressive Conservative	1945
2nd Prince	George H. Barbour	Liberal	1935
3rd Prince	Marin Gallant	Liberal	1935
4th Prince	Heath Strong	Progressive; Conservative	1931, 1943
5th Prince	Daniel F. MacNeill	Progressive; Conservative	1943
5th Prince	Francis J. MacNeill (1946)	Progressive; Conservative	1946
District	Councillor	Party	First elected / previously elected
1st Prince	Fred Ramsay	Liberal	1943
2nd Prince	William H. Dennis	Liberal	1915
2nd Prince	Forrest Phillips (1946)	Liberal	1946
3rd Prince	Thomas Linkletter	Liberal	1935
4th Prince	Horace Wright	Liberal	1927, (Note: Assemblyman) 1936
5th Prince	Ernest Strong	Progressive; Conservative	1943
5th Prince	Morley M. Bell (1945)	Liberal	1945

=== Queens ===
District	Assemblyman	Party	First elected / previously elected
1st Queens	Walter G. MacKenzie	Progressive; Conservative	1931, 1943
2nd Queens	Philip Matheson	Progressive; Conservative	1943
3rd Queens	Russell C. Clark	Liberal	1927, 1935
4th Queens	Dougald MacKinnon	Liberal	1935
5th Queens	William Prowse	Liberal	1935, 1943
District	Councillor	Party	First elected / previously elected
1st Queens	W. F. Alan Stewart	Liberal	1927, 1935
2nd Queens	Reginald Bell	Progressive; Conservative	1943
3rd Queens	Mark R. MacGuigan	Liberal	1935
3rd Queens	Eugene Cullen (1944)	Liberal	1944
4th Queens	John Walter Jones	Liberal	1935
5th Queens	William J. P. MacMillan	Progressive; Conservative	1923, 1939
