= Hubert B. MacNeill =

Canadian politician (1922–2020)

Hubert Bernard MacNeill (or McNeill, March 4, 1922 – February 19, 2020) was a Canadian physician and political figure on Prince Edward Island. He represented 5th Prince in the Legislative Assembly of Prince Edward Island from 1960 to 1966 as a Progressive Conservative.

He was born in Summerside, Prince Edward Island, the son of Daniel Francis MacNeill and Pearl Tamlyn, and was educated at Prince of Wales College and Dalhousie University. MacNeill served overseas during World War II. In 1952, he married Christine Mary Baker. In 1958, with four others, he established the Hillcrest Housing Company which provided housing for personnel at CFB Summerside; MacNeill was later president of the company. He served in the province's Executive Council as Minister of Health from 1959 to 1963 and then as Minister of Welfare and Labour. MacNeill was defeated when he ran for re-election in 1966. In 1983, he became manager of the Summerside Medical Centre.

His brother Francis and his uncle Leonard M. MacNeill also served in the provincial assembly. MacNeill died on February 19, 2020, at the age of 97 in Summerside.
