= Lemuel Owen =

Canadian politician

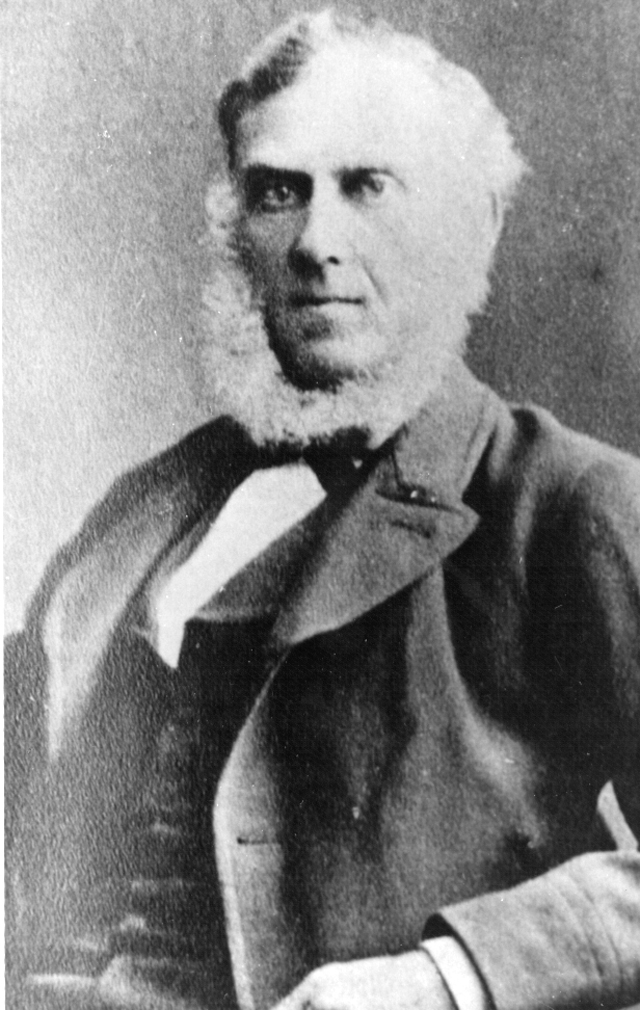

2nd Premier of Prince Edward Island
- In office September 1, 1873 – August 15, 1876
- Monarch: Victoria
- Lieutenant Governor: William Robinson; Robert Hodgson
- Preceded by: James Colledge Pope
- Succeeded by: Louis Henry Davies

Leader of the Conservative Party of Prince Edward Island
- In office September 1, 1873 – 1877
- Preceded by: James Colledge Pope
- Succeeded by: William Wilfred Sullivan

Member of the General Assembly of Prince Edward Island for 3rd Kings
- In office April 24, 1873 – August 10, 1876 Serving with A.C. MacDonald, J.E. MacDonald
- Preceded by: None
- Succeeded by: John Scrimgeour

Personal details
- Born: November 1, 1822 Charlottetown, Prince Edward Island Colony
- Died: November 26, 1912 (aged 90) Charlottetown, Prince Edward Island, Canada
- Party: Conservative
- Spouse: Lois Welsh (m. 1861)
- Children: William Edgar Wallace, Lemuel Cambridge, and Marion Adele
- Education: Prince of Wales College
- Occupation: Business person and shipping magnate
- Profession: Politician

Lemuel Cambridge Owen (November 1, 1822 – November 26, 1912) was a Prince Edward Island shipbuilder, banker, merchant, politician, and the second premier of Prince Edward Island.

He was born in Charlottetown to Thomas Owen, who was Postmaster General for Prince Edward Island for eighteen years, serving until his death in 1860. Owen was educated in private schools and at the Central Academy in Charlottetown (later Prince of Wales College). He was a brother of Canadian writer, Elizabeth Lee Owen Macdonald.

One of the island's most successful businessmen, Owen succeeded his father as Postmaster General of the island in 1860 before entering politics in 1866 winning election as a Conservative. Owen became Premier of the province in 1873 after James Colledge Pope entered federal politics. Owen was the second premier since PEI joined Canadian Confederation on July 1, 1873. His government set up a Land Commission that was responsible for using funds provided by the federal government to implement land reform and end the island's system of proprietary land ownership and tenant farming.

His government was unable to resolve the contentious schools question that divided both the Conservative and Liberal parties along sectarian lines and his government was replaced in 1876 by a Protestant coalition formed to implement a secular school system on the island. Owen retired from politics and returned to his business interests.

Owen had married Lois Welsh in 1861. He retired from business in 1892 and died at the home of one of his sons in Charlottetown in 1912.
