= Peter Gavin =

Peter Gavin may refer to:

- Peter Gavin (Canadian politician) (1847–1931)
- Peter Gavin (Australian politician) (born 1949)
