= George Bentley =

George Bentley may refer to:

- George Bentley (publisher) (1828–1895), English publisher
- George Bentley (politician) (1842–1909), Canadian politician
- George Bentley (Shortland Street), fictional character
