= John Matheson (disambiguation) =

John Matheson (1917–2013) was a Canadian lawyer, judge, and politician who helped develop both the maple leaf flag and the Order of Canada.

John Matheson can also refer to:

- John Archibald Matheson (1844–1919), Canadian politician
- John Matheson (bishop) (1901–1950), British Roman Catholic clergyman who served as the Bishop of Aberdeen
- Jack Matheson (1924–2011), Canadian sports journalist
