= Patrick Kelly (Canadian politician) =

Canadian politician

Patrick Kelly (March 17, 1846 – August 2, 1916) was a merchant, farmer and political figure on Prince Edward Island. He represented 3rd Kings in the Legislative Assembly of Prince Edward Island in 1904 as a Conservative.

The son of John Kelly and Sally Woods, both natives of Ireland, Kelly lived in Montague. He was also a dealer in spirits. In 1876, he married Mary Jane Hynes. Kelly was elected to the provincial assembly in a 1904 by-election held after the death of James E. MacDonald. He was defeated when he ran for reelection later that same year.
