= 46th General Assembly of Prince Edward Island =

The 46th General Assembly of Prince Edward Island was in session from February 24, 1948, to March 31, 1951. The Liberal Party led by John Walter Jones formed the government.

Eugene Cullen was elected speaker. Forest W. Phillips replaced Cullen as speaker in 1949.

There were five sessions of the 46th General Assembly:

Session	Start	End
1st	February 24, 1948	March 25, 1948
2nd	February 22, 1949	March 23, 1949
3rd	February 27, 1950	March 30, 1950
4th	September 7, 1950	November 29, 1950
5th	March 6, 1951	March 30, 1951

== Members ==
=== Kings ===
District	Assemblyman	Party	First elected / previously elected
1st Kings	John R. McLean	Progressive; Conservative	1940, 1947
2nd Kings	Harry Cox (Note: died)	Liberal	1927
2nd Kings	Harvey Douglas (1950)	Liberal	1950
3rd Kings	Joseph G. Campbell	Liberal	1947
4th Kings	John A. Campbell (Note: resigned)	Liberal	1927
4th Kings	Daniel A. MacRae (1949)	Liberal	1949
5th Kings	William Hughes	Liberal	1935
District	Councillor	Party	First elected / previously elected
1st Kings	T. J. Kickham (Note: elected to federal seat)	Liberal	1943
1st Kings	Brenton St. John (1949)	Liberal	1949
2nd Kings	Lou Burge	Progressive; Conservative	1947
3rd Kings	Keir Clark	Liberal	1947
4th Kings	Alexander Wallace Matheson	Liberal	1940, (Note: 2nd Queens (Assemblyman)) 1947
5th Kings	George Saville	Liberal	1935

=== Prince ===
District	Assemblyman	Party	First elected / previously elected
1st Prince	Hector Richard	Liberal	1947
2nd Prince	George H. Barbour (Note: named to Senate)	Liberal	1935
2nd Prince	Walter Darby (1949)	Liberal	1949
3rd Prince	J. Wilfred Arsenault	Liberal	1947
4th Prince	Cleveland Baker	Liberal	1935, 1947
5th Prince	Carrol Delaney	Liberal	1947
District	Councillor	Party	First elected / previously elected
1st Prince	Fred Ramsay	Liberal	1943
2nd Prince	Forrest Phillips	Liberal	1946
3rd Prince	Thomas Linkletter	Liberal	1935
4th Prince	Horace Wright	Liberal	1927, (Note: Assemblyman) 1936
4th Prince	J. George MacKay (1949)	Liberal	1949
5th Prince	Lorne H. MacFarlane	Liberal	1947

=== Queens ===
District	Assemblyman	Party	First elected / previously elected
1st Queens	Frederic Large	Liberal	1947
2nd Queens	Philip Matheson	Progressive; Conservative	1943
3rd Queens	Russell C. Clark	Liberal	1927, 1935
4th Queens	Dougald MacKinnon	Liberal	1935
5th Queens	David L. Matheson	Progressive; Conservative	1947
District	Councillor	Party	First elected / previously elected
1st Queens	W. F. Alan Stewart	Liberal	1927, 1935
2nd Queens	Reginald Bell	Progressive; Conservative	1943
3rd Queens	Eugene Cullen	Liberal	1944
4th Queens	John Walter Jones	Liberal	1935
5th Queens	William J. P. MacMillan	Progressive; Conservative	1923, 1939
