= Stephen Wastie Deblois =

Canadian politician

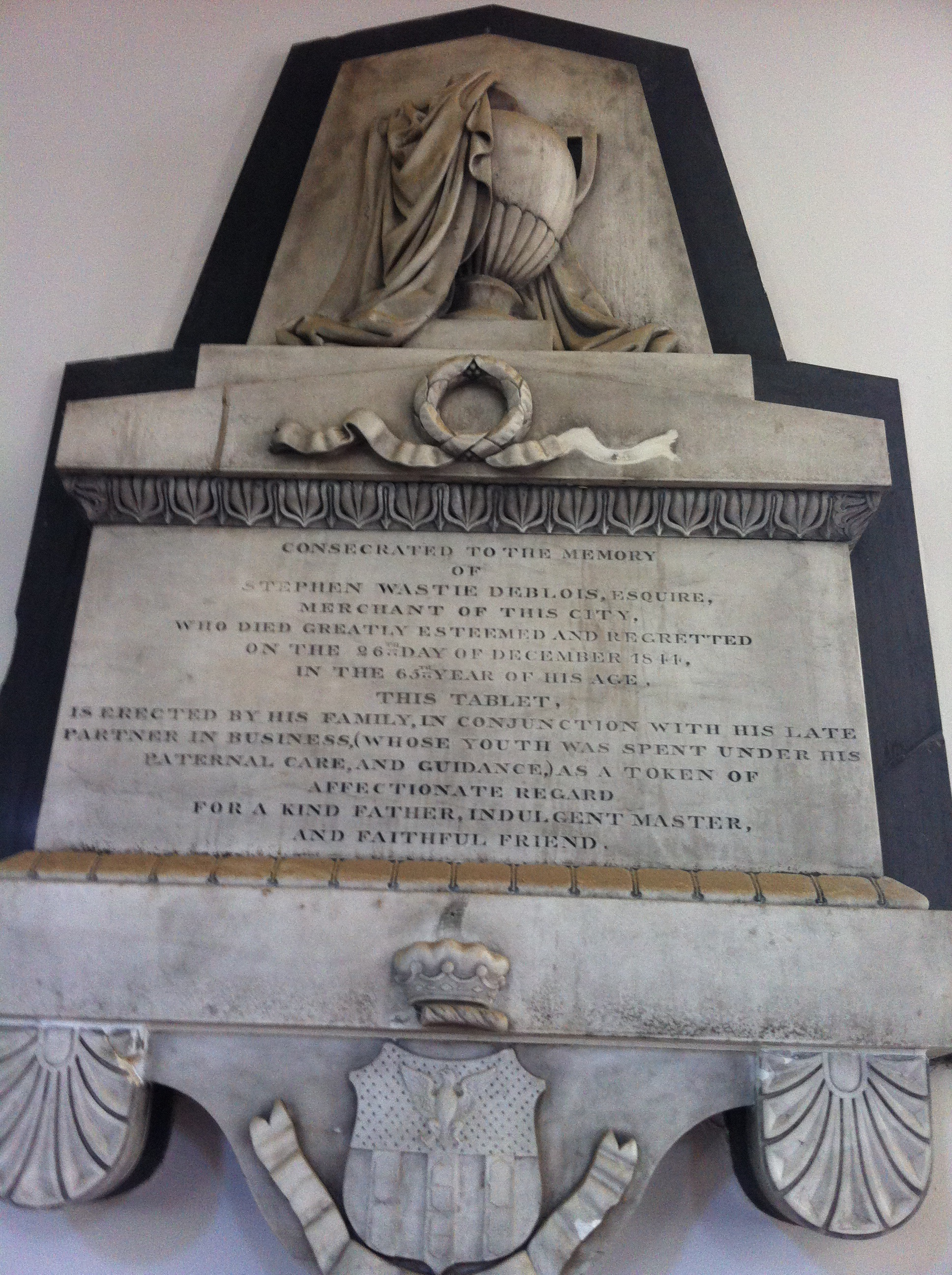
Stephen Deblois, St George's Church, Halifax, Nova Scotia

Stephen Wastie Deblois (January 16, 1780 – December 26, 1844) was a businessman and political figure in Nova Scotia. He represented Halifax township in the Nova Scotia House of Assembly from 1830 to 1836.

He was born in New York City, the son of George Deblois and Sarah Deblois. He later moved to Halifax with his family near the end of the American Revolution. After his father died in 1799, his mother took over the operation of the family business. Deblois became an auctioneer. He was a member of the Halifax Chamber of Commerce and served as its vice-president. He had a family with Jane Catherine Witham and later married her. Deblois defeated Beamish Murdoch to become a member of the provincial assembly in 1830. He died in Halifax at the age of 64.

His son George Wastie Deblois served in the assembly for Prince Edward Island.
