= Beamish Murdoch =

Canadian politician (1800–1876)

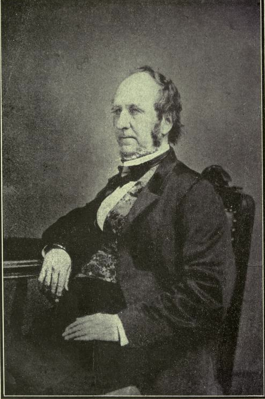
- Beamish Murdoch
- Born: August 1, 1800; Halifax, Nova Scotia
- Died: February 9, 1876 (aged 75); Lunenburg, Nova Scotia, Canada
- Occupations: Lawyer, historian, and political figure
- Notable work: A History of Nova-Scotia, Or Acadie

Beamish Murdoch (August 1, 1800 – February 9, 1876) was a lawyer, historian, and political figure in Nova Scotia. He represented Halifax township in the Nova Scotia House of Assembly from 1826 to 1830.

He was born in Halifax, Nova Scotia, the son of Andrew Murdoch and Elizabeth Beamish. His family had come to Nova Scotia from the North of Ireland. His grandfather, a Presbyterian minister, Rev. James Murdoch served several parishes in the Province for 23 years. Murdoch was admitted to the Nova Scotia bar in 1822. In 1824, he was elected vice-president of the Charitable Irish Society in Halifax.

He also contributed articles to the Acadian Recorder and the Acadian Magazine or Literary Mirror. Murdoch was defeated by Stephen Wastie Deblois when he ran for reelection in 1830; he was an unsuccessful candidate again in 1836 and 1840. He served as president of the Halifax Temperance Society. In 1841, Murdoch became clerk for the Central Board of Education and, in 1852, was named record for the city of Halifax. Between 1865 and 1867, he published A History of Nova-Scotia, Or Acadie.

He died in Lunenburg at the age of 75. He is buried with a gravestone at the Hillcrest Cemetery (Lunenburg, Nova Scotia).
