= Donald Newton MacKay =

Canadian politician and farmer (1868–1943)

MLA for 1st Queens
- In office July 23, 1935 – September 15, 1943

Personal details
- Born: 1 July 1868 Springfield, Prince Edward Island, Canada
- Died: 19 December 1943 (aged 75) Charlottetown, Prince Edward Island, Canada
- Party: Liberal
- Spouse: Flora Sutherland
- Children: 2
- Relatives: Leone Bagnall (granddaughter)

Donald Newton MacKay (July 1, 1868 – December 19, 1943) was a farmer and politician in Prince Edward Island, Canada. He represented 1st Queens in the Legislative Assembly of Prince Edward Island from 1935 to 1943 as a member of the Liberal Party.

Born in Springfield, the son of William MacKay and Catherine Mallett, MacKay was educated at the local school and became a successful farmer. He was a member of many farming organizations, a supporter of the cooperative movement and an ardent proponent of temperance, belonging to the Sons of Temperance. In 1895 he married Flora Sutherland, with whom he had two children.

He was first elected to the Legislative Assembly in the 1935 general election, and was re-elected in the 1939 general election. He was defeated in the 1943 general election. His granddaughter, Leone Bagnall, later represented 1st Queens as a Progressive Conservative from 1979 to 1993.

MacKay died at the Prince Edward Island Hospital in Charlottetown on 19 December 1943.
