= Donald Cameron (Prince Edward Island politician) =

Canadian politician

Donald Cameron (ca. 1836 – in or after 1882) was a farmer, official and political figure on Prince Edward Island. He represented 1st Queens in the Legislative Assembly of Prince Edward Island from 1867 to 1873 and from 1879 to 1882 as a Conservative.

He was born in Springton, Prince Edward Island, the son of John Cameron, a Scottish immigrant, and Mary Stuart. He was educated there and settled in Springton. Cameron was defeated when he ran for reelection in 1873 and again in 1882. He was postmaster for Township 67 and a commissioner for taking affidavits in Supreme Court.
