= Francis MacNeill =

Canadian politician

Francis J. "Peg" MacNeill (October 15, 1912 – July 12, 2000) was an educator and political figure on Prince Edward Island. He represented 5th Prince in the Legislative Assembly of Prince Edward Island from 1946 to 1947 as a Progressive Conservative.

He was born in Summerside, Prince Edward Island, the son of Daniel F. MacNeill and Pearl Tamlyn, and was educated at Prince of Wales College, Saint Dunstan's College, Saint Francis Xavier University and the University of New Brunswick. He taught school, later becoming a school principal and then superintendent of schools for Summerside. MacNeill served overseas during World War II. He married Anne Marie de la Garde in 1940.

MacNeill was elected to the provincial assembly in a 1946 by-election held following the death of his father. He was defeated when he ran for reelection in 1947. He died at the Prince County Hospital in Summerside at the age of 87.

His brother Hubert and his uncle Leonard M. MacNeill also served in the provincial assembly.
