= William A. Poole =

Canadian politician

William Aitken Poole (September 1, 1831 – August 28, 1903) was a farmer, merchant and political figure on Prince Edward Island. He represented 4th Prince in the Legislative Assembly of Prince Edward Island from 1879 to 1882 as a Conservative.

He was born in Murray Harbour, Prince Edward Island, the son of John Poole. He married Christina Leslie in 1860. He was defeated when he ran for re-election in 1882. Poole died in Lower Montague.
