= Hector C. McDonald =

Canadian politician

Hector Charles McDonald, KC (May 3, 1856 – May 10, 1914) was a barrister, judge and political figure in Prince Edward Island. He represented 4th Queens in the Legislative Assembly of Prince Edward Island from 1890 to 1899 as a Liberal member.

He was born in Belfast, Prince Edward Island, the son of John McDonald and Marcy McKinnon, of Scottish descent. McDonald was educated at Prince of Wales College and McGill College. He was called to the bar in 1886 and was named Queen's Counsel in 1898. He served in the province's Executive Council as Attorney General from 1897 to 1899.

McDonald resigned his seat in 1899 after he was named judge in the Queens County court He died in Charlottetown at the age of 58.

McDonald was also a prominent member of the Freemasons and of the Knights of Pythias.
