= Alexander MacNevin =

Canadian politician

Alexander J. MacNevin (September 20, 1885 – August 25, 1937) was a merchant, farmer and political figure on Prince Edward Island. He represented 1st Queens in the Legislative Assembly of Prince Edward Island from 1916 to 1919 and from 1924 to 1927 as a Conservative.

He was born in Argyle Shore, Prince Edward Island, the son of John McNevin and Ann Campbell, and was educated at Charlottetown Business College. McNevin was defeated when he ran for reelection in 1919. He lived in Bonshaw for many years. Around 1927, McNevin moved to Toronto after becoming a partner in the Canada Varnish Company. He died there at the age of 51.
