= Meddie Gallant =

Canadian politician

Amédée "Meddie" Gallant (October 24, 1848 – June 19, 1933) was a farmer, fish exporter and political figure on Prince Edward Island. He represented 1st Prince in the Legislative Assembly of Prince Edward Island from 1898 to 1899 as a Liberal.

He was born in Bloomfield, Prince Edward Island, the son of Fabien Gallant. In 1877, he married Véronique Pineau. He was elected to the provincial assembly in an 1898 by-election held after Edward Hackett resigned his seat to run for a federal seat. However, the by-election result was then contested under the provincial Controverted Elections Act, and was overturned by Justice E. J. Hodgson on February 7, 1899. The by-election was rerun on July 25, 1899, and was won by Henry Pineau.

He was supervisor of highways for West Prince. Gallant died in Bloomfield at the age of 84.
