= John F. MacNeill =

Canadian politician

John Forbes MacNeill (May 11, 1870 – May 8, 1962) was a physician and political figure on Prince Edward Island. He represented 5th Prince in the Legislative Assembly of Prince Edward Island as a Liberal from 1922 to 1923, from 1928 to 1931 and from 1932 to 1935.

He was born in Long Creek, Prince Edward Island, the son of John Alexander MacNeill and Catherine MacKenzie, and was educated at Prince of Wales College and McGill University. MacNeill operated drug stores in Montague and Summerside before receiving his medical degree; he went on to practise medicine in Summerside for 55 years. He married Rudy Darrach in 1903.

MacNeill was first elected to the provincial assembly in a 1922 by-election held after James A. MacNeill ran for a federal seat. He was defeated when he ran for reelection in 1923 and 1931 and then elected again in a 1932 by-election held after the death of Leonard M. MacNeill. He was named to the province's Executive Council in 1927 as a minister without portfolio.

MacNeill was a president of the Medical Society of Canada. He also was a Grand Master in the Masonic Order.

He died at home in Summerside at the age of 91.
