= 1st Queens =

Electoral district of Prince Edward Island, Canada

Prince Edward Island electoral district
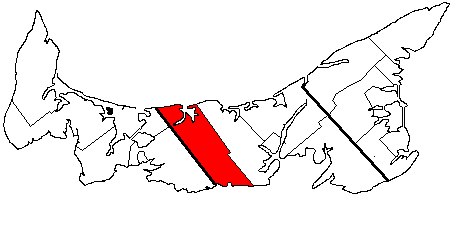

Defunct provincial electoral district
- Legislature: Legislative Assembly of Prince Edward Island
- District created: 1873
- District abolished: 1996
- First contested: 1873
- Last contested: 1993

Demographics
- Census division: Queens County

1st Queens was a provincial electoral district of Prince Edward Island, Canada, which elected two members to the Legislative Assembly of Prince Edward Island from 1873 until the riding was abolished in 1996 with the elimination of dual member ridings.

The district comprised the westernmost portion of Queens County.

The district holds a unique place in the history of women's participation in Prince Edward Island's provincial politics. In 1970, it elected Jean Canfield to the legislature as the province's first female MLA; in 1979, the election of Marion Reid and Leone Bagnall made it the first district in the province's history to elect women to both of its legislative seats. Reid became the province's first female speaker of the legislature; after her retirement from electoral politics she also became the province's first female lieutenant governor. In 1993, the district elected Catherine Callbeck, the province's first female premier.

== Members ==
=== Dual member ===
Assembly	Years	Member	Party	Member	Party
26th	1873	Peter Sinclair, Sr.	Liberal	William Stewart	Liberal
26th	1873–1876	William Campbell	Conservative	William Stewart	Liberal
27th	1876–1879	William Campbell	Conservative	William Stewart	Liberal
28th	1879–1882	William Campbell	Conservative	Donald Cameron	Conservative
29th	1882–1886	William Campbell	Conservative	Peter Sinclair, Sr.	Liberal
30th	1886–1890	James Sutherland	Conservative	Peter Sinclair, Sr.	Liberal
31st	1890–1891	James Sutherland	Conservative	Peter Sinclair, Sr.	Liberal
31st	1891–1893	Alexander Warburton	Liberal	Peter Sinclair, Sr.	Liberal

=== Assemblyman-Councillor ===
Assembly	Years	Assemblyman	Party	Councillor	Party
32nd	1893–1897	Alexander Warburton	Liberal	Peter Sinclair, Sr.	Liberal
33rd	1897–1898	Alexander Warburton	Liberal	Peter Sinclair, Sr.	Liberal
33rd	1898–1900	William Campbell	Conservative	Peter Sinclair, Sr.	Liberal
34th	1900–1904	Matthew Smith	Liberal	George Simpson	Liberal
35th	1904–1906	Matthew Smith	Liberal	George Simpson	Liberal
35th	1906–1908	Matthew Smith	Liberal	Murdock Kennedy	Conservative
36th	1908–1909	Murdock Kennedy	Conservative	Matthew Smith	Liberal
36th	1909–1912	Murdock Kennedy	Conservative	Cyrus Crosby	Liberal
37th	1912–1915	Murdock Kennedy	Conservative	John Myers	Conservative
38th	1915–1919	Murdock Kennedy	Conservative	Alexander McNevin	Conservative
39th	1919–1923	Murdock Kennedy	Conservative	Cyrus Crosby	Liberal
40th	1923–1927	Murdock Kennedy	Conservative	Alexander McNevin	Conservative
41st	1927–1931	Peter Sinclair, Jr.	Liberal	Alan Stewart	Liberal
42nd	1931–1935	Thomas Wigmore	Conservative	Walter MacKenzie	Conservative
43rd	1935–1939	Donald McKay	Liberal	Alan Stewart	Liberal
44th	1939–1943	Donald McKay	Liberal	Alan Stewart	Liberal
45th	1943–1947	Walter MacKenzie	Progressive Conservative	Alan Stewart	Liberal
46th	1947–1951	Frederic Large	Liberal	Alan Stewart	Liberal
47th	1951–1955	Frank Myers	Progressive Conservative	Alan Stewart	Liberal
48th	1955–1957	Alan Stewart	Liberal	Frederic Large	Liberal
48th	1957–1959	Frank Myers	Progressive Conservative	Frederic Large	Liberal
49th	1959–1962	Frank Myers	Progressive Conservative	Walter Shaw	Progressive Conservative
50th	1962–1966	Frank Myers	Progressive Conservative	Walter Shaw	Progressive Conservative
51st	1966–1970	Frank Myers	Progressive Conservative	Walter Shaw	Progressive Conservative
52nd	1970–1974	Jean Canfield	Liberal	Ralph Johnstone	Liberal
53rd	1974–1978	Jean Canfield	Liberal	Ralph Johnstone	Liberal
54th	1978–1979	Jean Canfield	Liberal	Ralph Johnstone	Liberal
55th	1979–1982	Marion Reid	Progressive Conservative	Leone Bagnall	Progressive Conservative
56th	1982–1986	Marion Reid	Progressive Conservative	Leone Bagnall	Progressive Conservative
57th	1986–1989	Marion Reid	Progressive Conservative	Leone Bagnall	Progressive Conservative
58th	1989–1993	Marion Murphy	Liberal	Leone Bagnall	Progressive Conservative
59th	1993–1996	Marion Murphy	Liberal	Catherine Callbeck	Liberal

== See also ==
- List of Prince Edward Island provincial electoral districts
- Canadian provincial electoral districts
