= 4th Queens =

Former provincial electoral district in Prince Edward Island, Canada

Prince Edward Island electoral district
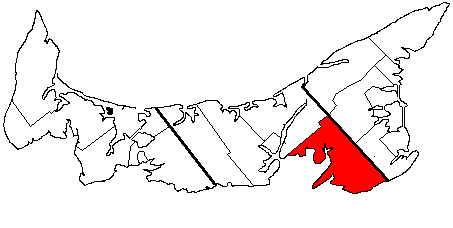

Defunct provincial electoral district
- Legislature: Legislative Assembly of Prince Edward Island
- District created: 1873
- District abolished: 1996
- First contested: 1873
- Last contested: 1993

Demographics
- Census division: Queens County

4th Queens was a provincial electoral district of Prince Edward Island, Canada, which elected two members to the Legislative Assembly of Prince Edward Island from 1873 to 1993.

The district comprised the southeastern portion of Queens County. It was abolished in 1996 when Prince Edward Island adopted single-member constituencies for the 1996 general election.

== History ==
The district was one of the original constituencies created for the 1873 Prince Edward Island general election, the first provincial election after Prince Edward Island joined Confederation. Its first members included David Laird, who later served as the first Lieutenant-Governor of the Northwest Territories and Keewatin.

Like all Prince Edward Island districts of the period, 4th Queens initially elected two members with the undifferentiated title of member. From 1893, the district elected one Assemblyman and one Councillor simultaneously. John Walter Jones, who served as Premier of Prince Edward Island from 1943 to 1953, represented the district as Councillor from 1935 to 1955. Angus MacLean, who served as Premier from 1979 to 1981, held the Councillor seat from 1976 to 1982.

The district was abolished following the adoption of the Electoral Boundaries Act (Royal Assent 19 May 1994), effective at the 1996 general election, with its territory redistributed into Belfast-Murray River and Vernon River-Stratford.

== Members ==
=== Dual member ===
Assembly	Years	Member	Party	Member	Party
26th	1873	David Laird	Independent	Benjamin Davies	Liberal
26th	1873–1876	William Welsh	Liberal	Benjamin Davies	Liberal
27th	1876–1879	William Welsh	Liberal	John F. Robertson	Liberal
28th	1879	James Nicholson	Conservative	Donald Montgomery	Independent
28th	1879–1882	James Nicholson	Conservative	Duncan Crawford	Conservative
29th	1882–1884	Donald C. Martin	Liberal	Angus D. MacMillan	Liberal
29th	1884–1886	Donald C. Martin	Liberal	Alexander Martin	Conservative
30th	1886–1888	Donald C. Martin	Liberal	George Forbes	Liberal
30th	1888–1890	Vacant		George Forbes	Liberal
31st	1890–1893	Hector C. McDonald	Liberal	George Forbes	Liberal

=== Assemblyman-Councillor ===
Assembly	Years	Assemblyman	Party	Councillor	Party
32nd	1893–1897	Hector C. McDonald	Liberal	George Forbes	Liberal
33rd	1897–1899	Hector C. McDonald	Liberal	George Forbes	Liberal
33rd	1899–1900	Angus MacLean	Independent	George Forbes	Liberal
34th	1900–1904	David Irving	Liberal	George Forbes	Liberal
35th	1904–1908	David Irving	Liberal	Francis Haszard	Liberal
36th	1908–1911	David Irving	Liberal	Francis Haszard	Liberal
36th	1911–1912	David Irving	Liberal	Alexander Macphail	Conservative
37th	1912–1915	John S. Martin	Conservative	Alexander Macphail	Conservative
38th	1915–1919	John S. Martin	Conservative	George Forbes	Liberal
39th	1919–1923	James Irving	Liberal	Frederick Nash	Liberal
40th	1923–1927	James Irving	Liberal	Shaw McMillan	Conservative
41st	1927–1928	James Larabee	Liberal	George Inman	Liberal
41st	1928–1931	James Larabee	Liberal	Callum Bruce	Liberal
42nd	1931–1935	James Larabee	Liberal	Callum Bruce	Liberal
43rd	1935–1939	Dougald MacKinnon	Liberal	John Walter Jones	Liberal
44th	1939–1943	Dougald MacKinnon	Liberal	John Walter Jones	Liberal
45th	1943–1947	Dougald MacKinnon	Liberal	John Walter Jones	Liberal
46th	1947–1951	Dougald MacKinnon	Liberal	John Walter Jones	Liberal
47th	1951–1953	Dougald MacKinnon	Liberal	John Walter Jones	Liberal
47th	1953–1955	Dougald MacKinnon	Liberal	Harold Smith	Liberal
48th	1955–1959	Dougald MacKinnon	Liberal	Harold Smith	Liberal
49th	1959–1962	Stewart Ross	Liberal	Harold Smith	Liberal
50th	1962–1966	Stewart Ross	Liberal	Harold Smith	Liberal
51st	1966–1970	Stewart Ross	Liberal	Harold Smith	Liberal
52nd	1970–1974	Stewart Ross	Liberal	Daniel Compton	Progressive Conservative
53rd	1974–1976	Vernon MacIntyre	Progressive Conservative	Daniel Compton	Progressive Conservative
53rd	1976–1978	Angus MacLean	Progressive Conservative	Daniel Compton	Progressive Conservative
54th	1978–1979	Angus MacLean	Progressive Conservative	Daniel Compton	Progressive Conservative
55th	1979–1982	Angus MacLean	Progressive Conservative	Daniel Compton	Progressive Conservative
56th	1982–1986	Wilbur MacDonald	Progressive Conservative	Daniel Compton	Progressive Conservative
57th	1986–1989	Wilbur MacDonald	Progressive Conservative	Lynwood MacPherson	Liberal
58th	1989–1993	Alan Buchanan	Liberal	Lynwood MacPherson	Liberal
59th	1993–1996	Alan Buchanan	Liberal	Lynwood MacPherson	Liberal

Sources: Elections Prince Edward Island.

== See also ==
- List of Prince Edward Island provincial electoral districts
- Canadian provincial electoral districts
