= Alexander Macphail =

James Alexander Macphail CMG DSO (January 25, 1870 – January 13, 1949) was a Canadian engineer, educator and political figure on Prince Edward Island. He represented 4th Queens in the Legislative Assembly of Prince Edward Island from 1911 to 1915 as a Conservative.

He was born in Orwell, Prince Edward Island, the son of William Macphail and Catherine E. Smith, and was educated at Prince of Wales College, McGill University and Queen's University. In 1910, he married Agnes Mary Moray MacMorine. He was a professor in the School of Mining and then the Department of Civil Engineering at Queen's, later becoming department head.

He served with the Royal Canadian Engineers during World War I. He led a company of engineers as a major, later reaching the rank of lieutenant-colonel. During the war, Macphail received the Distinguished Service Order, and was appointed a Companion of the Order of St Michael and St George in the 1919 New Year Honours, for services rendered in connection with military operations in France and Flanders.

His brother Andrew was a noted physician, educator and author.
