= Lucius Kelly =

Canadian politician

Lucius Owen Kelly (June 18, 1858 – July 11, 1932) was a farmer and political figure on Prince Edward Island, Canada. He represented 3rd Queens in the Legislative Assembly of Prince Edward Island from 1886 to 1890 as a Conservative.

He was born in Fort Augustus, Prince Edward Island, the son of Francis Kelly and Sarah McCarron, and was educated at Prince of Wales College and at a business college in Charlottetown. Kelly was defeated when he ran for reelection in 1890. He also served as a commissioner of the peace. Kelly moved to Boston later in life and died there at the age of 74.
