= Alfred Lefurgey =

Canadian politician

Alfred Alexander Lefurgey
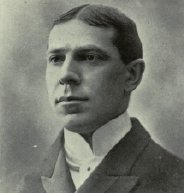

Member of the Canadian Parliament for East Prince
- In office 1900–1904
- Preceded by: John Howatt Bell
- Succeeded by: District was abolished in 1903

Member of the Canadian Parliament for Prince
- In office 1904–1908
- Preceded by: District was created in 1903
- Succeeded by: James William Richards

Member of the Legislative Assembly of Prince Edward Island for 5th Prince
- In office 1897–1900

Personal details
- Born: April 22, 1871 Summerside, Prince Edward Island, Canada
- Died: November 11, 1934 (aged 63)
- Party: Conservative
- Relations: John Lefurgey, father
- Education: Prince of Wales College; Dalhousie University Medical School

Alfred Alexander Lefurgey (April 22, 1871 – November 11, 1934) was a Canadian lawyer and politician.

Born in Summerside, Prince Edward Island, the son of John Lefurgey, Lefurgey was educated at St. Dunstan's College, Mount Allison University (B.A. in 1891) and Harvard Law School (LL.B in 1894). He returned to Summerside where he entered his father's ship building and shipping business with his brother, John Ephraim.

Lefurgey was first elected to the Legislative Assembly of Prince Edward Island for 5th Prince in 1897. Lefurgey resigned his seat in 1898 to run unsuccessfully for a federal seat in 1898. He was elected to the House of Commons of Canada for East Prince in the general elections of 1900 and re-elected in 1904 for Prince. A Conservative, he was defeated in 1908 and again in 1917. In the House of Commons, he served as Conservative whip for the Maritime provinces.

Lefurgey was a prominent member in the Masonic order.
