= Henry Pineau =

Canadian politician (1863–1904)

Assemblyman for 1st Prince
- In office 1899–1900
- Preceded by: Meddie Gallant
- Succeeded by: Benjamin Gallant

Personal details
- Born: January 22, 1863 Bloomfield, Prince Edward Island
- Died: February 18, 1904 (aged 41) Miminegash, Prince Edward Island
- Party: Conservative → Liberal

Henry Pineau (January 22, 1863 – February 18, 1904) was a Canadian politician, who represented the electoral district of 1st Prince in the Legislative Assembly of Prince Edward Island from 1899 to 1900. A member of the Conservative Party, he was most noted for crossing the floor to vote with the governing Liberals on a crucial motion of non-confidence in early 1900.

A farmer and fisherman in Miminegash, Prince Edward Island, Pineau was elected to the legislature in a by-election in 1899, after the election of Meddie Gallant in an 1898 by-election was overturned by the courts. However, he was rarely actually present in the legislature until the confidence crisis of early 1900, when the government of Donald Farquharson was threatened by MLA Joseph Wise's attempt to withdraw his earlier resignation; Wise attempted to vote with the Conservatives, which would have brought down the government, but his vote was disqualified by speaker James Cummiskey. Pineau then crossed the floor to the Liberals, ensuring the government's survival on the vote.

Pineau did not run for reelection in the 1900 general election. He died on February 18, 1904, in Miminegash.
