= George Forbes (Canadian politician) =

Canadian politician

George Forbes (November 25, 1840 – December 17, 1925) was a merchant and political figure in Prince Edward Island. He represented 4th Queens in the Legislative Assembly of Prince Edward Island from 1886 to 1904 and from 1915 to 1919 as a Liberal member.

He was born in Hillsborough River, Prince Edward Island, the son of Malcolm Forbes. Forbes served as postmaster for Vernon Bridge where he also operated a store and shipping business. In 1877, he married Jessie Isabella Stewart. Forbes also served on the Board of Education.
