= Bernard Donald McLellan =

Canadian politician

Bernard Donald McLellan (November 3, 1859 – April 11, 1907) was a Canadian farmer and political figure in Prince Edward Island. He represented 1st Prince in the Legislative Assembly of Prince Edward Island from 1888 to 1893 and West Prince in the House of Commons of Canada from 1898 to 1900 as a Liberal member.

McLellan was born in Indian River, Prince Edward Island, the son of Angus J. McLellan and Matilda McDonald, and educated at St. Dunstan's College in Charlottetown. McLellan taught school for nine years. In 1881, he married Emily Costin. McLellan was speaker for the provincial assembly from 1891 to 1893. He was elected to the House of Commons in an 1898 by-election held after the death of Stanislaus Francis Perry. McLellan was unsuccessful in a bid for reelection to the federal seat in 1900.

His uncle John Alexander MacDonald also served as speaker for the provincial assembly.
