= Emanuel McEachen =

Canadian politician

Emanuel McEachen (c.1816 – November 5, 1875) was a farmer and political figure on Prince Edward Island. He represented 1st Kings in the Legislative Assembly of Prince Edward Island in 1854, from 1866 to 1867, from 1870 to 1872 and from 1873 to 1875 as a Conservative.

He was born at South Lake, Prince Edward Island, the son of Charles McEachern and Mary Beaton, a few months after the death of his father. He took over the operation of the family farm at a young age. McEachern also served as a justice of the peace. He was opposed to the island joining the Dominion of Canada. He served in the province's Executive Council as Commissioner of Public Lands. He was defeated when he ran for reelection in 1858, 1863, 1867 and 1872. McEachern died in office in Charlottetown.
