= Cyrus Crosby =

Canadian politician

Cyrus William Crosby (January 13, 1855 – January 20, 1936) was a farmer, mill owner and political figure on Prince Edward Island. He represented 1st Queens in the Legislative Assembly of Prince Edward Island from 1909 to 1911 and from 1920 to 1923 as a Liberal.

He was born in Bonshaw, Prince Edward Island, the son of Andrew C. Crosby and Sarah McNeill. In 1882, he married Grace McNeill. He was first elected to the provincial assembly in a 1909 by-election held after the death of Matthew Smith. He served in the province's Executive Council as Commissioner of Public Works from 1919 to 1923. Because of the improvements made to the provincial highway system during his tenure, he was given the nickname "Good Roads Crosby". Crosby was defeated when he ran for reelection in 1912, 1915 and 1923. He sold his farm in 1921 and moved to Charlottetown, settling in Souris later in life. Crosby died in Souris at the age of 81.
