= James J. Johnston =

English boxing promoter and manager (1875–1946)

- Born: James Joy Johnston; November 28, 1875; Liverpool, England
- Died: May 7, 1946 (aged 70); New York, U.S.
- Other names: The Boy Bandit of Broadway, "Pop" Johnston
- Occupations: Boxing promoter Boxing manager

James Joy Johnston (November 28, 1875 – May 7, 1946) was an English boxer, boxing manager, promoter, and matchmaker who was in the fight business for 40 years.

== Early life ==
James Joy Johnston was born in Liverpool, England, on November 28, 1875.

He and his family relocated to the United States when he was 12 years old.

== Career ==
The émigré from Liverpool worked in an iron foundry while boxing professionally as a bantamweight in New York. As a professional boxer, he once refused $50 to fight "Terrible Terry" McGovern.

He worked under Charley Harvey, a specialist in importing English boxers, before starting his own management career around 1912.

While managing the Central Boxing Club at the Manhattan Casino in July 1921, Johnston was charged with withholding $9,000 in ticket tax and held on $1,000 bail. Under the Revenue Act of 1918, he was convicted for failing to pay and report federal taxes on boxing match admissions.

By 1924, Johnston was serving as matchmaker for the Cromwell Athletic Club, the Polo Grounds A.C., and other small clubs.

Johnston's stable included nine world champions, and featured former world light heavyweight champion Mike McTigue. He also managed England's Phil Scott during the "golden twenties." The boxing manager maneuvered Scott into the title shot discussions with Boston heavyweight Jack Sharkey in 1930.

In 1931, Johnston managed Dodger Athletic Club, Inc., which directed Brooklyn's Ebbets Field. He set up a fight between Jack Sharkey and Primo Carnera that year, but a court ruled against him after Madison Square Garden asserted exclusive contract rights to Carnera. He later handled promotion for the Sharkey–Carnera fight at Ebbets Field and notably gave James J. Braddock a chance on the undercard.

=== Madison Square Garden ===
Johnston accepted an offer to be general manager of Madison Square Garden Corp. in October 1931, with a yearly salary of $25,000. He succeeded the late Tex Rickard as the fight promoter for Madison Square Garden.

On June 21, 1932, he staged Sharkey vs. Max Schmeling for the world heavyweight championship. The next month, he introduced the idea of an elimination tournament to select a challenger for Sharkey.

Johnston promoted featherweight champion Kid Chocolate vs. Tony Canzoneri at the Garden in 1933. By that time, multiple members of the Johnston family were actively involved in combat sports. His brother, Charles B. Johnston, handled wrestling bookings throughout New York State, and his son, James J. Johnston Jr., was matchmaker at the St. Nicholas Arena.

By the mid-1930s, he held another heavyweight elimination tournament at the Garden. He staged Braddock against Max Baer in the summer of 1935. Johnston initially refused to book Joe Louis at the arena, believing that a Black fighter would not draw sufficient ticket sales. Louis's success at Yankee Stadium led to his acceptance at most venues, including the Garden.

Johnston served as the Garden's matchmaker for six years before being succeeded by Mike Jacobs in October 1937. While at the Garden, he oversaw 35 world championship bouts—five for the heavyweight title—and ensured the operation remained profitable. Johnston reentered the managing scene that year.

== Death ==
James J. Johnston died at 70 years old on May 7, 1946, in New York, United States.

== Legacy ==
Known for his rich vocabulary, signature derby hat, and tea-drinking habit, the Englishman from Liverpool cultivated a distinctive persona. "The Boy Bandit of Broadway" was the nickname coined for him by American sportswriter Damon Runyon. He was profiled by author Marcus Griffin in the 1933 book "Wise Guy: James J. Johnston: A Rhapsody in Fistics," published by Vanguard Press.

In 1999, James J. Johnston was inducted into the International Boxing Hall of Fame.

Johnston was later portrayed by American actor Bruce McGill in the 2005 film Cinderella Man.

== Personal life ==
By the year 1937, he was the patriarch of a large boxing family, with 12 children between the ages of 4 and 38. His brothers—Charlie, Willie, and Ned—were all active in the sport: Charlie managed several fighters including Bobby Pacho; Willie promoted events at St. Nicholas Arena; and Ned trained their stable. His 30-year-old son Jimmy Jr. managed Bob Pastor, Tommy Tucker, and Maxie Farber.
