= James A. MacNeill =

Canadian politician (1854–1927)

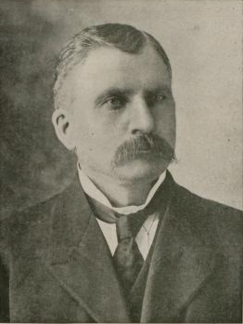
James A. MacNeill

James A. MacNeill (July 22, 1854 – January 28, 1927) was a blacksmith, merchant and political figure in Prince Edward Island, Canada. He represented 5th Prince in the Legislative Assembly of Prince Edward Island from 1908 to 1922 and from 1923 to 1926 as a Conservative member.

He was born at Travellers Rest, Prince Edward Island, the son of Malcolm MacNeill and Isabel McDonald. He sold farm equipment. MacNeill was elected to the Summerside Town Council and was mayor from 1901 to 1904. He also served as chairman of the Water Commission and chief of the Fire Department. MacNeill served on the province's Executive Council as Commissioner of Public Works. His sons Leonard and Daniel Francis and his grandsons Francis J. MacNeill and Hubert B. MacNeill also served in the provincial assembly.
