= Thomas Kelly (Canadian politician) =

Canadian politician

Thomas Kelly (October 1833 – 1893) was a lawyer, judge and political figure in Prince Edward Island. He represented 5th Prince in the Legislative Assembly of Prince Edward Island from 1872 to 1875 as a Conservative member.

He was born in Covehead Road, Prince Edward Island in Queens County, the son of Thomas Kelly and Mary Grace, Irish immigrants, and was educated in Charlottetown. Kelly studied law in Saint John, New Brunswick, was called to the bars for New Brunswick and Prince Edward Island in 1865 and set up practice in Summerside. He married Mary Emeline Eskildson in 1867. In 1871, he married Marianne Campbell after the death of his first wife. He was a director of the Summerside Bank. Kelly served on the first board of railway commissioners for Prince Edward Island, resigning in 1872 when the government of James Colledge Pope was defeated. In 1877, Kelly was elected license commissioner and also became town recorder for Summerside. In 1879, he was named judge in the court for Prince County. Kelly was also named a commissioner for swearing in officials for the Dominion of Canada in Prince Edward Island in 1880.
