= Francis Gallant =

Canadian politician

Francis "Frank" Gallant (March 17, 1841 – October 3, 1905) was a merchant, mariner and political figure on Prince Edward Island. He represented 1st Prince in the Legislative Assembly of Prince Edward Island from 1875 to 1876 as a Conservative member.

He was born François Gallant in Nail Pond, Prince Edward Island, the son of Sylvain Gallant and Mary Gaudet. He went to sea at a young age and became a master mariner involved in the trade with the West Indies. After 14 years at sea, he established a lobster packing at Tignish. Gallant then became a general merchant. He served as postmaster for Tignish and operated an inn there. In 1870, he married Katherine McKenna. Gallant was elected to the provincial assembly in an 1875 by-election held after Stanislaus Francis Perry was elected to the House of Commons. Gallant died in Tignish at the age of 64.

His daughter Bertha married Aubin-Edmond Arsenault.
