= Hilary McIsaac =

Canadian politician

Hilary McIsaac (November 1, 1820 – August 23, 1901) was a farmer, shipbuilder and political figure in Prince Edward Island. He represented 2nd Kings in the Legislative Assembly of Prince Edward Island from 1872 to 1879 as a Conservative member.

He was born in St. Peters Bay, Prince Edward Island, the son of Dougald McIsaac, an Irish immigrant. In 1852, he married Sophie McDonald. McIsaac served on the Board of Works and was customs collector and controller of navigation laws for Port St. Peters.

McIsaac, who was also a justice of the peace and a commissioner for the probate of wills, was defeated when he ran for reelection in 1879. He died in Head of St. Peters Bay at the age of 80.
