= Donald A. MacDonald =

Canadian politician (c. 1849 – 1884)

Donald A. MacDonald (c. 1849 – 9 May 1884) was a farmer and political figure on Prince Edward Island. He represented 3rd Queens in the Legislative Assembly of Prince Edward Island from 1879 to 1882 as a Conservative.

MacDonald lived in French Village, Prince Edward Island. He married Margaret McDonald in 1880. He was elected to the provincial assembly in an 1879 by-election held following the death of Francis Kelly. MacDonald was defeated when he ran for reelection in 1882.
