= 1st Prince =

Electoral district of Prince Edward Island, Canada

Prince Edward Island electoral district
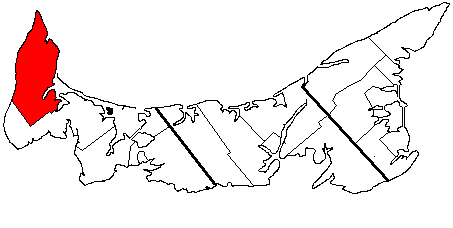

Defunct provincial electoral district
- Legislature: Legislative Assembly of Prince Edward Island
- District created: 1873
- District abolished: 1996
- First contested: 1873
- Last contested: 1993

Demographics
- Census division: Prince County

1st Prince was a provincial electoral district of Prince Edward Island, Canada, which elected two members to the Legislative Assembly of Prince Edward Island from 1873 to 1993. It was also used in pre-Confederation colonial elections such as the 1859 election electing two members of the 21st General Assembly of Prince Edward Island.

The district comprised the westernmost portion of Prince County. Communities in the district included Alberton and Tignish.

When the provincial electoral districts were reorganized into conventional single-member districts in 1996, 1st Prince was replaced by the districts of Tignish-DeBlois, Alberton-Miminegash, and West Point-Bloomfield.

== Members ==
=== Dual member ===
Assembly	Years	Member	Party	Member	Party
26th	1873	George Howlan	Liberal	Stanislaus Perry	Liberal
26th	1873–1875	Nicholas Conroy	Liberal	Stanislaus Perry	Liberal
26th	1875–1876	Nicholas Conroy	Liberal	Francis Gallant	Conservative
27th	1876–1879	Nicholas Conroy	Liberal	Edward Hackett	Conservative
28th	1879	Nicholas Conroy	Liberal	Peter Gavin	Conservative
28th	1879–1882	Stanislaus Perry	Liberal	Peter Gavin	Conservative
29th	1882–1886	Stanislaus Perry	Liberal	John Matheson	Liberal
30th	1886–1887	Stanislaus Perry	Liberal	John Matheson	Liberal
30th	1887–1888	vacant		John Matheson	Liberal
30th	1888–1890	Bernard Donald McLellan	Liberal	John Matheson	Liberal
31st	1890–1893	Bernard Donald McLellan	Liberal	John Matheson	Liberal

=== Assemblyman-Councillor ===
Assembly	Years	Assemblyman	Party	Councillor	Party
32nd	1893–1897	Jeremiah Blanchard	Conservative	Benjamin Rogers	Liberal
33rd	1897–1898	Edward Hackett	Conservative	James Birch	Liberal
33rd	1898–1899	Meddie Gallant	Conservative	James Birch	Liberal
33rd	1899–1900	Henry Pineau	Conservative	James Birch	Liberal
33rd	1900	Henry Pineau	Liberal	James Birch	Liberal
34th	1900–1904	Benjamin Gallant	Liberal	Benjamin Rogers	Liberal
35th	1904–1908	Benjamin Gallant	Liberal	John Agnew	Liberal
36th	1908–1912	Benjamin Gallant	Liberal	John Agnew	Liberal
37th	1912–1915	Sylvain Gallant	Conservative	Charles Dalton	Conservative
38th	1915–1919	Benjamin Gallant	Liberal	Charles Dalton	Conservative
39th	1919–1923	Benjamin Gallant	Liberal	Christopher Metherall	Liberal
39th	1922–1923	Jeremiah Blanchard	Liberal	Christopher Metherall	Liberal
40th	1923–1927	Jeremiah Blanchard	Liberal	Wilfred Tanton	Conservative
41st	1927–1931	Jeremiah Blanchard	Liberal	Robert H. Gordon	Liberal
42nd	1931–1935	Aeneas Gallant	Liberal	Thane Campbell	Liberal
43rd	1935–1939	Aeneas Gallant	Liberal	Thane Campbell	Liberal
44th	1939–1943	Aeneas Gallant	Liberal	Thane Campbell	Liberal
45th	1943–1945	Alphonse Bernard	Liberal	Fred Ramsay	Liberal
45th	1945–1947	Clarence Morrissey	Liberal	Fred Ramsay	Liberal
46th	1947–1951	Hector Richard	Liberal	Fred Ramsay	Liberal
47th	1951–1955	Hubert Gaudet	Progressive Conservative	Don Campbell	Progressive Conservative
48th	1955–1959	Prosper Arsenault	Liberal	Fred Ramsay	Liberal
49th	1959–1962	Hubert Gaudet	Progressive Conservative	Don Campbell	Progressive Conservative
50th	1962–1966	Prosper Arsenault	Liberal	Bob Campbell	Liberal
51st	1966–1970	Prosper Arsenault	Liberal	Bob Campbell	Liberal
52nd	1970–1974	Russell Perry	Liberal	Bob Campbell	Liberal
53rd	1974–1978	Russell Perry	Liberal	Bob Campbell	Liberal
54th	1978–1979	Russell Perry	Liberal	Bob Campbell	Liberal
55th	1979–1982	Russell Perry	Liberal	Bob Campbell	Liberal
56th	1982–1986	Bobby Morrissey	Liberal	Bob Campbell	Liberal
57th	1986–1989	Bobby Morrissey	Liberal	Bob Campbell	Liberal
58th	1989–1992	Bobby Morrissey	Liberal	Bob Campbell	Liberal
58th	1992–1993	Bobby Morrissey	Liberal	vacant	
59th	1993–1996	Bobby Morrissey	Liberal	Hector MacLeod	Liberal

== See also ==
- List of Prince Edward Island provincial electoral districts
- Canadian provincial electoral districts
