= Aubin-Edmond Arsenault =

Canadian politician

Aubin-Edmond Arsenault LL.D. M.A.
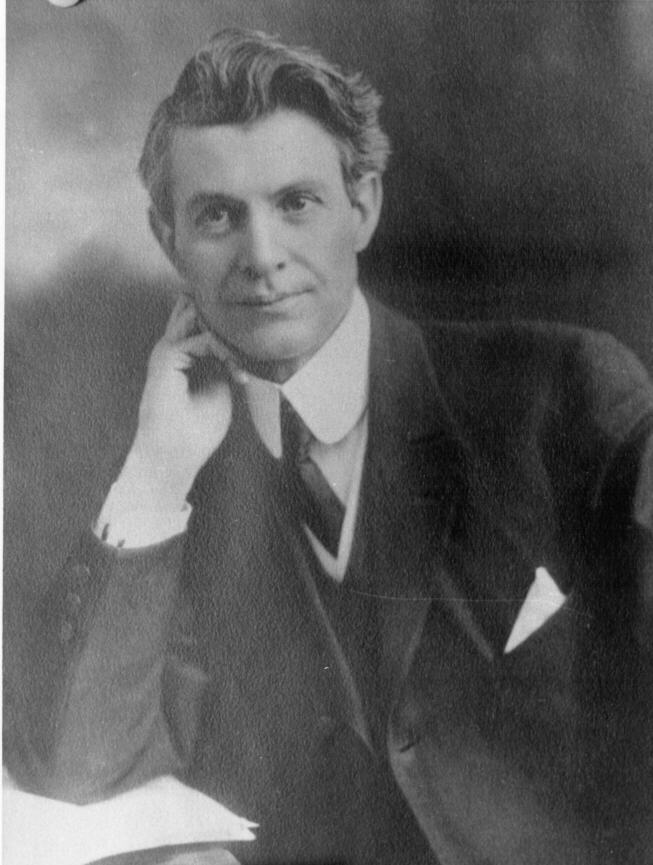

13th Premier of Prince Edward Island
- In office 21 June 1917 – 9 September 1919
- Monarch: George V
- Lieutenant Governor: Augustine C. Macdonald; Murdoch McKinnon
- Preceded by: John A. Mathieson
- Succeeded by: John Howatt Bell

Leader of the Conservative Party of Prince Edward Island
- In office 21 June 1917 – 1 May 1921
- Preceded by: John A. Mathieson
- Succeeded by: James David Stewart

MLA (Assemblyman) for 3rd Prince
- In office 11 November 1908 – 1 May 1921
- Preceded by: Joseph F. H. Arsenault
- Succeeded by: Adrien Arsenault

Personal details
- Born: 28 July 1870 Egmont Bay, Prince County, Prince Edward Island Colony
- Died: 29 April 1968 (aged 97) Charlottetown, Prince Edward Island, Canada
- Party: Conservative
- Spouse(s): Anita Bertha Rose Gallant (m. 1907)
- Relations: Joseph-Octave Arsenault (father)
- Children: 11
- Education: St. Dunstan's College
- Occupation: teacher, lawyer, and judge
- Profession: Politician
- Cabinet: Minister without Portfolio (1912–1917); Attorney General (1917–1919)

Aubin-Edmond Arsenault (28 July 1870 – 29 April 1968) was a Prince Edward Island politician. He was the 13th premier of Prince Edward Island from 1917 to 1919.

Born in Egmont Bay, Prince County, Prince Edward Island, Arsenault's family settled on the island in 1729, when it was a French called Île-Saint-Jean. His father, Joseph-Octave Arsenault, was a provincial politician and the first Acadian from PEI to be named to the Senate of Canada. Arsenault was educated at St. Dunstan's College, Charlottetown, and St. Joseph University, New Brunswick. He studied law with McLeod, Morson and McQuarrie in Charlottetown and with Charles Russell, Baron Russell of Killowen in London. He was admitted to the bar in 1898. Arsenault married Bertha, the daughter of Francis Gallant.

He was first elected to the Legislative Assembly of Prince Edward Island in 1908 as a Conservative. In 1912 he became Attorney-General in the government of Premier John A. Mathieson. When Mathieson left politics for a judicial appointment in 1917, Arsenault succeeded him becoming the first Acadian to be premier in any province.

Arsenault's government repealed legislation to restrict automobile travel on the island to specific days and routes. His government also founded the PEI Travel Bureau. His government was defeated in the 1919 election, and he served as leader of the opposition until 1921 when he was appointed to the Supreme Court of Prince Edward Island. He retired in 1946.
