= James Miller Sutherland =

Canadian politician

Member of the Legislative Assembly of Prince Edward Island
- In office 1887–1891
- Constituency: 1st Queens

Personal details
- Born: June 30, 1853 Park Corner, Prince Edward Island, British North America
- Died: 1921 (aged 67–68)
- Party: Liberal
- Education: Prince of Wales College
- Occupation: Attorney, politician

James Miller Sutherland (June 30, 1853 – 1921) was a lawyer and political figure in Prince Edward Island, Canada. He represented 1st Queens in the Legislative Assembly of Prince Edward Island from 1887 to 1891 as a Liberal member.

He was born in Park Corner, Prince Edward Island, the son of John S. Sutherland, a Scottish immigrant. Sutherland was educated at Prince of Wales College in Charlottetown, was called to the bar in 1877 and set up practice in Charlottetown. He married Isabella Henderson. He resigned his seat in the provincial assembly in 1891.
