= Albert Prowse =

Canadian politician (1858–1925)

Albert Perkins Prowse (December 24, 1858 – June 20, 1925) was a merchant and political figure in Prince Edward Island, Canada. He represented 4th Kings in the Legislative Assembly of Prince Edward Island from 1899 to 1900, from 1904 to 1919 and from 1923 to 1925 as a Conservative member. He served as Speaker of the Legislative Assembly of Prince Edward Island from 1918 to 1919.

He was born in Charlottetown, Prince Edward Island, the son of Samuel Prowse and Eliza Willis. Prowse was educated at the Wesleyan Academy and then entered his father's business. His brother William joined the business some time later. Prowse exported dried fish, canned lobsters and farm produce. In 1881, he married Williamina A. Kirkland. Prowse ran unsuccessfully for a seat in the provincial assembly in 1897 but defeated Donald Alexander MacKinnon in an 1899 by-election held after MacKinnon was named attorney general. Prowse died in office in 1925.
