= Angus D. MacMillan =

Canadian politician

Angus D. MacMillan (February 18, 1839 – January 1, 1884) was a merchant and political figure on Prince Edward Island. He represented 4th Queens in the Legislative Assembly of Prince Edward Island from 1882 to 1884 as a Liberal.

He was born in Wood Islands, Prince Edward Island, the son of Duncan MacMillan and Mary Shaw, of Scottish descent. MacMillan married Clara S. Janes-Cornish in 1871. He died in office at the age of 44.
