= John F. Robertson =

Canadian politician

John Ferguson Robertson (July 10, 1841 – October 25, 1905) was a merchant, ship broker and political figure on Prince Edward Island. He represented 4th Queens in the Legislative Assembly of Prince Edward Island from 1876 to 1879.

He was born in New Perth, Prince Edward Island, the son of Peter Robinson and Annie McFarlane. Robertson worked as a clerk and then later was a partner and manager in a shipbuilding firm. In 1869, he married Margaret Heatherington. He served as a member of the province's Executive Council. He also served as provincial auditor. Robertson died in Charlottetown at the age of 64.
