= Nicholas Conroy =

Canadian politician

Nicholas Conroy (1816 – October 13, 1879) was an Irish-born farmer and politician in Prince Edward Island. He represented 1st Prince in the PEI House of Assembly (Legislative Assembly of Prince Edward Island) from 1846 to 1850 as a Tory, and from 1859 to 1867 and from 1873 to 1879 as a Liberal member.

He was born in Rathdowney, the son of Thomas Conroy, and came to Prince Edward Island with his father in 1835. He ran unsuccessfully for a seat in the provincial assembly in 1842 but was elected in 1846. In 1851, he married Catherine McDonald. Conroy was defeated in 1867 in 1st Prince but was reelected in an 1873 by-election after George William Howlan was named to the Canadian Senate. He supported the creation of separate schools in the province but became a trustee for the public school in Tignish after the Public School Act of 1877 was passed. Conroy served as a member of the Executive Council for a short time in 1879 but resigned his seat in June 1879 due to poor health. He died of brain disease at home in Tignish later that year.
