= Angus McMillan (politician) =

Canadian politician

Angus McMillan (October 29, 1817 – March 13, 1906) was a Scottish-born merchant and political figure in Prince Edward Island. He represented 5th Prince in the Legislative Assembly of Prince Edward Island from 1868 to 1872, from 1876 to 1882 and from 1890 to 1900 as a Liberal member.

He was born in Argyll, the son of Hugh McMillan, was educated in Scotland and came to Prince Edward Island with his family in 1834, settling at [Wheatley River. In 1851, he began building ships; McMillan would eventually build 58 vessels over his career. He married Mary Ross in 1855. In 1866, he moved to Summerside, where he established additional shipbuilding yards. In 1865, he was named director for the Summerside Bank and he later served as its president. McMillan was first elected in an 1868 by-election, defeating Conservative leader James Colledge Pope. He was a member of the Executive Council from 1878 to 1879 and from 1891 to 1900, serving as provincial secretary and treasurer and commissioner of crown and public lands. He retired from politics in 1900. McMillan died at Wheatley River in 1906.
