= James Nicholson (Canadian politician) =

Canadian politician

James Nicholson (October 16, 1827 – June 10, 1905) was a farmer and political figure in Prince Edward Island. He represented 4th Queens in the Legislative Assembly of Prince Edward Island from 1879 to 1882 as a Conservative member.

He was born in Belfast, Prince Edward Island, the son of Samuel Nicholson, who came to the island from the Isle of Skye, Scotland, and Flora McLeod. In 1855, he married Mary Jane Monroe.

He was defeated when he ran for reelection in 1882. In 1882, he was elected to the Legislative Council and served until 1892. He was Conservative leader in the Legislative Council and was a member of the province's Executive Council from 1887 to 1891. Nicholson died in Eldon at the age of 77.
