= Creelman MacArthur =

Canadian politician

The Hon. Creelman MacArthur

Senator for Prince, Prince Edward Island
- In office 1925–1943
- Appointed by: William Lyon Mackenzie King

Member of the Legislative Assembly of Prince Edward Island for 5th Prince
- In office 1919–1925

Personal details
- Born: June 12, 1874 Summerside, Prince Edward Island
- Died: December 27, 1943 (aged 69) Summerside, Prince Edward Island
- Party: Liberal

Creelman MacArthur (June 12, 1874 – December 27, 1943) was a senator in the Parliament of Canada representing Prince Edward Island. He was a businessman in Summerside, Prince Edward Island.

Born and educated in Summerside, he was the son of Jeremiah MacArthur and Ellen Donald. MacArthur was married twice: to Hannah Lois Beattie in 1899 and to Muriel Mabel Lee in 1937. He was elected to the Summerside Town Council in 1915, serving until 1919 when he became a Liberal member of the Legislative Assembly for the district of 5th Prince. He resigned his seat in 1925 when the prime minister of Canada, William Lyon Mackenzie King, appointed him to the Senate of Canada.

MacArthur promoted his island home as a tourist destination. He built a noted summer home at Foxley River where he entertained extensively, including, in the summer of 1933, the officers and petty officers of the Royal Navy sloop, HMS Scarborough.

He died in office in Summerside at the age of 69.

His daughter Constance married John David Stewart.
