= John Archibald Matheson =

Canadian politician (1844–1919)

John Archibald Matheson (September 3, 1844 – March 20, 1919) was a merchant and politician in Prince Edward Island. He represented 1st Prince in the Legislative Assembly of Prince Edward Island from 1883 to 1893.

He was born in Black River, Queens County, Prince Edward Island, the son of John Matheson, a Scottish immigrant. He was educated there and in Charlottetown. He worked for George Howlan before establishing his own business, operating as a general merchant and also being involved in fishing. In 1881, he married Emily M. Clowser. Matheson was a justice of the peace and postmaster. His election in 1883 was declared invalid but he was reelected in the by-election held later that same year.

Matheson was defeated when he ran for reelection in 1893. He died in Revelstoke, British Columbia at the age of 74.
