= James P. McIntyre =

Canadian politician (1883–1957)

James Peter McIntyre (July 19, 1883 – April 8, 1957) was a farmer, lobster packer and political figure on Prince Edward Island. He represented 2nd Kings in the Legislative Assembly of Prince Edward Island from 1919 to 1923 and from 1927 to 1943 as a Liberal. McIntyre sat for Mount Stewart division in the Senate of Canada from 1943 to 1957.

He was born in St. Andrews, Prince Edward Island, the son of William D. McIntyre and Elizabeth MacKinnon. In 1908, he married Marion Amelia Story. He ran unsuccessfully for a seat in the provincial assembly in a 1917 by-election held following the death of James McInnis. He was defeated when he ran for reelection to the assembly in 1923. McIntyre served in the province's Executive Council as Minister of Public Works from 1927 to 1931 and as Minister of Public Works and Highways from 1935 to 1943. He died in office during a visit to Massachusetts at the age of 73.
