= Leonard M. MacNeill =

Canadian politician

Leonard Malcolm MacNeill (December 11, 1883 – February 23, 1932) was an accountant and political figure on Prince Edward Island. He represented 5th Prince in the Legislative Assembly of Prince Edward Island in 1932 as a Conservative.

He was born in Summerside, Prince Edward Island, the son of James A. MacNeill and Sarah Eliza, and was educated there. He worked as an accountant for the town of Summerside before joining R. T. Holman Limited, later becoming chief accounting for the firm. MacNeill married Elizabeth Regina Deagan. He retired in 1928 to take over the operation of his father's business. He served in the province's Executive Council as Minister of Public Works and Highways. MacNeill died in office in Summerside at the age of 48.

His brother Daniel Francis also served in the provincial assembly.
