= William Dunbar Stewart =

Canadian politician

William Dunbar Stewart (August 20, 1839 – October 28, 1918) was a merchant, bookkeeper and political figure on Prince Edward Island. He represented 1st Queens in the Legislative Assembly of Prince Edward Island from 1873 to 1879 as a Liberal.

Stewart was born in New Perth, Prince Edward Island, the son of Peter Stewart and Lizzie McIntyre. In 1866, he married Thomasina Amelia Pidgeon. Stewart served in the province's Executive Council as Commissioner of Public Works. Stewart was defeated when he ran for reelection in 1879. He lived in New London and later Charlottetown.
