= Donald Montgomery (educator) =

Canadian politician

Donald Montgomery (May 3, 1848 – May 14, 1890) was an educator and political figure in Prince Edward Island, Canada. He represented 4th Queens in the Legislative Assembly of Prince Edward Island from 1878 to 1879 as an Independent member. He was chief superintendent of education for the province from 1879 until his death.

He was born in Valleyfield, Prince Edward Island, the son of Malcolm Montgomery, a Scottish-born farmer. Montgomery taught school in rural Kings County before continuing his education at Prince of Wales College. In 1874, he became master of the province's Normal School and Model School. Montgomery was dismissed in 1877 by the government of Louis Henry Davies because it was felt that he lacked sufficient credentials for the post. He studied law at McGill College before returning to the island in 1878. He was elected to the provincial assembly in a by-election held that year and was reelected in the general election the following year. In September 1879, he resigned his seat to become superintendent of education, an office that he had suggested should be created. Among other duties, Montgomery was charged with implementing the 1877 Public Schools Act. He established a Provincial Educational Institute, which held an annual convention to provide professional development for the province's teachers. He also took steps to try to encourage French language education at Prince of Wales College. In 1887, he married Mary Isabella, the daughter of William McPhail. Montgomery died in Charlottetown in 1890. His death was attributed to his heart having been weakened by a vaccination against smallpox.
