= Adrien Arsenault =

Canadian politician

Adrien F. Arsenault (April 12, 1889 – June 28, 1941) was a lawyer and political figure on Prince Edward Island. He represented 3rd Prince in the Legislative Assembly from 1922 to 1935 as a Conservative.

== Biography ==
He was born in Egmont Bay, Prince Edward Island, the son of Étienne J. Arsenault and Philomène Pitre, and was educated at the Université Saint-Joseph. He studied law with Albert C. Saunders and practised in the office of MacQuarrie and Arsenault at Summerside. Arsenault was married twice: to Bernice A. MacDonald, the daughter of John Alexander MacDonald, in 1920 and to Ellen MacNeill in 1935. He was first elected to the provincial assembly in a 1922 by-election held after Aubin Edmond Arsenault was named a judge. Arsenault served in the province's Executive Council as a minister without portfolio from 1923 to 1927 and from 1931 to 1935. He died in Summerside at the age of 52.
