= John Scrimgeour (Canadian politician) =

Canadian politician

John Gow Scrimgeour (9 September 1842 – 21 August 1917) was a Scottish-born farmer and political figure in Prince Edward Island. He represented 3rd Kings in the Legislative Assembly of Prince Edward Island from 1871 to 1872 and from 1876 to 1878 as a Liberal member. He was a member of the Legislative Council for the province from 1886 to 1894.

He was born in Glasgow, the son of John Scrimgeour, came to Prince Edward Island with his parents in 1843 and was educated there. In 1885, he married Charlotte Sencabaugh. He served as Usher of the Black Rod for the Legislative Council from 1879 to 1880.

Scrimgeour died in Cardigan at the age of 74.
