= George Wastie Deblois =

Canadian politician and businessman

George Wastie DeBlois (July 12, 1824 – August 14, 1886) was a businessman and political figure in Prince Edward Island. He represented 5th Queens in the Legislative Assembly of Prince Edward Island from 1877 to 1882 as a Conservative member.

He was born in Halifax, Nova Scotia, the son of Stephen Wastie Deblois, a merchant there. He moved to Charlottetown in 1847. Later that year, he married Sarah Frances, the daughter of Thomas Heath Haviland, Sr. DeBlois was the land agent for the Cunard family and several other large land owners on the island. In 1875, these properties were purchased by the provincial government. He was also a justice of the peace, a lieutenant-colonel in the local militia and a trustee for Prince of Wales College. DeBlois was named to the Executive Council in 1877, serving as provincial secretary and treasurer, but resigned in 1878 following the passage of the Public Schools Act; his main reason for supporting the coalition government had been the issue of public schools. He died in Charlottetown Royalty in 1886.
