= Donald Charles Martin =

Canadian politician

Donald Charles Martin (February 1, 1849 – January 10, 1888) was a lawyer and political figure in Prince Edward Island. He represented 4th Queens in the Legislative Assembly of Prince Edward Island from 1882 to 1888 as a Liberal member.

He was born in Belfast, Prince Edward Island and educated at Prince of Wales College in Charlottetown and Dalhousie College in Halifax. Martin was called to the bar in 1879 and set up practice in Charlottetown. Martin taught high school in Alberton for five years before entering the study of law in 1875.

He died in office in Charlottetown at the age of 38.
