= George William Howlan =

Canadian politician

The Honourable George William Howlan
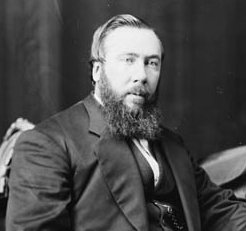

6th Lieutenant Governor of Prince Edward Island
- In office February 21, 1894 – May 23, 1899
- Monarch: Victoria
- Governors General: The Earl of Aberdeen; The Earl of Minto
- Premier: Frederick Peters; Alexander Warburton; Donald Farquharson
- Preceded by: Jedediah Slason Carvell
- Succeeded by: Peter Adolphus McIntyre

Senator for Alberton, Prince Edward Island
- In office March 25, 1891 – February 1894
- Nominated by: John A. Macdonald
- In office January 5, 1881 – February 18, 1891
- Nominated by: John A. Macdonald
- In office October 18, 1873 – December 27, 1880
- Nominated by: John A. Macdonald

Member of the Legislative Assembly of Prince Edward Island for 1st Prince
- In office 1862–1873

Personal details
- Born: May 19, 1835 New Ross, County Wexford, Ireland
- Died: May 11, 1901 (aged 65) Charlottetown, Prince Edward Island, Dominion of Canada
- Party: Liberal
- Spouses: Elizabeth Olson (m. 1866) Mary Doran (m. 1881)
- Education: University of Prince Edward Island
- Occupation: merchant, ship owner, ship builder, and customs officer
- Profession: Politician

George William Howlan (May 19, 1835 – May 11, 1901) was an Irish-born merchant, ship owner and political figure in Prince Edward Island.

He represented 1st Prince in the Legislative Assembly of Prince Edward Island from 1863 to 1873 as a Liberal member. He represented Alberton division in the Senate of Canada from 1873 to 1894 and was the province's sixth Lieutenant Governor from 1894 to 1899.

He was born in Wexford and came to Nova Scotia with his parents in the late 1830s. They settled in Prince Edward Island in 1839. Howlan was educated in Charlottetown and was hired as a clerk in a store there in 1850. He moved to Cascumpec (later Alberton), first working for a Boston merchant there and then setting up his own business. In 1866, he married Elizabeth Olson. Howlan was named to the Executive Council in 1867, serving until 1873. However, in 1870, he threw his support behind the Conservatives after Protestants in the Liberal caucus refused to support separate schools. Howlan initially opposed Confederation, believing that the island would have little say. However, he supported railway building in the province and the resulting debt load forced the island to reconsider union with Canada. In 1873, he was named customs collector at Charlottetown.

In 1873, Howlan ran unsuccessfully for a seat in the House of Commons but was named to the Senate that same year. He married Mary E. Doran in 1881 after the death of his first wife. Howlan resigned from his seat in the Senate in 1891 to run unsuccessfully for a seat in the House of Commons but was appointed again to the Senate later that year. Also in 1891, he went to England as a representative of the province to discuss with engineers there the feasibility of a tunnel connecting the island to the mainland. Howlan died in Charlottetown in 1901.

1891 Canadian federal election: Prince County
Party	Candidate	Votes	Elected	
Liberal	John Yeo	3,279		X
Liberal	Stanislaus Francis Perry	3,182		X
Conservative	George William Howlan	2,903		
Conservative	Richard Hunt	2,661		
