= Peter Gavin (Canadian politician) =

Canadian politician

Peter Gavin (October 15, 1847 – February 22, 1931) was a merchant and political figure in Prince Edward Island. He represented 1st Prince in the Legislative Assembly of Prince Edward Island from 1879 to 1883 as a Conservative member.

He was born in Tignish, Prince Edward Island, the son of Michael Gavin, an Irish immigrant. He was educated in Tignish. In 1876, he married Anastasia Ryan. Gavin served as a member of the Executive Council. He lived in Alberton.

He was defeated when he ran for reelection in 1883. He was the co-owner of a general store and owned a lobster factory. Gavin died in Duluth, Minnesota at the age of 83.
