= Lauchlin MacDonald =

Canadian politician

Lauchlin MacDonald (March 25, 1844 – October 27, 1928) was a farmer and political figure in Prince Edward Island, Canada. He represented 1st Kings from 1875 to 1883 and from 1908 to 1912 in the Legislative Assembly of Prince Edward Island as a Liberal member.

He was born on the family farm at East Point, Kings County, Prince Edward Island, the son of Ronald Macdonald and Catherine Macdonald. He was educated at St. Dunstan's College. MacDonald was an unsuccessful candidate for a seat in the provincial assembly in 1873. He was first elected to the provincial assembly in an 1875 by-election held after Emmanuel McEachern died. He was a vice-president of the Prince Edward Island Dairy Association, president of the Cheese Board of Trade of Prince Edward Island and president of the East Point Farmers' Institute. In 1876, he married Teresa McLean. MacDonald was named lighthouse keeper for East Point in 1897.

He died in Charlottetown at the age of 84.
