= Albert Charles Saunders =

Canadian politician

The Honourable Albert Charles Saunders K.C.
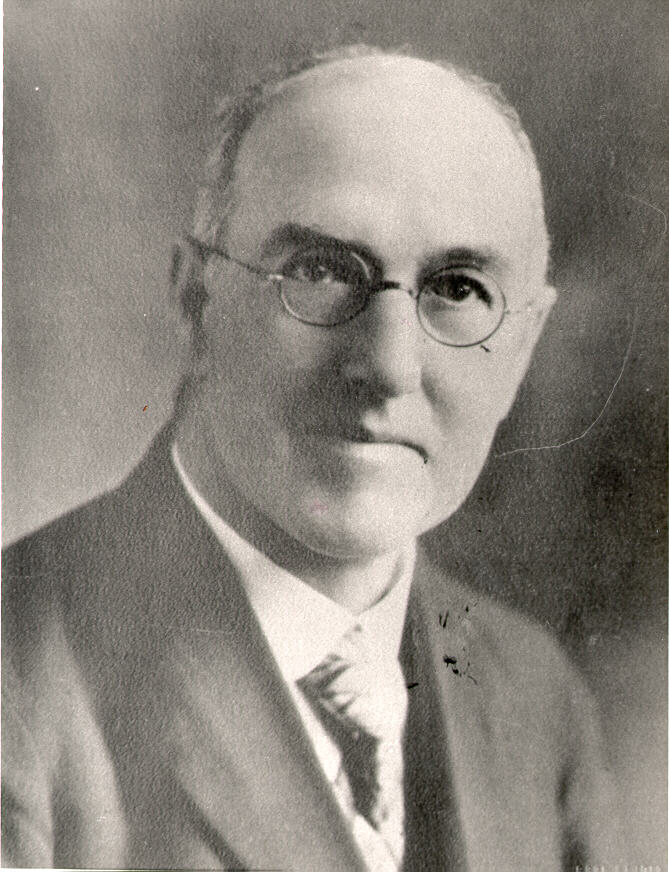

16th Premier of Prince Edward Island
- In office August 21, 1927 – May 20, 1930
- Monarch: George V
- Lieutenant Governor: Frank Richard Heartz
- Preceded by: James D. Stewart
- Succeeded by: Walter Lea

Leader of the Prince Edward Island Liberal Party
- In office July 26, 1923 – May 20, 1930
- Preceded by: John Howatt Bell
- Succeeded by: Walter Lea

MLA (Assemblyman) for 1st Prince
- In office September 16, 1915 – May 20, 1930
- Preceded by: John Richards
- Succeeded by: Shelton Sharp

Personal details
- Born: October 12, 1874 Summerside, Prince Edward Island
- Died: October 18, 1943 (aged 69) Summerside, Prince Edward Island
- Party: Liberal
- Spouse: Leila Zwicker Graves (m. 1902)
- Children: 4
- Education: Prince of Wales College
- Occupation: lawyer and judge
- Profession: Politician

Albert Charles Saunders (October 12, 1874 – October 18, 1943) was a Canadian politician and jurist from Prince Edward Island.

Saunders served as mayor of Summerside for four terms. He was first elected to the provincial legislature in 1919 and became leader of the opposition Liberal Party in 1923.

He led the Liberals to victory in the 1927 election by supporting the continuation of total prohibition against the Conservative government's proposals to ease the temperance measure. The Saunders government revised the curriculum of the public school system, raised the salaries of teachers and improved the island's roads.

He served as the 16th premier of Prince Edward Island until 1930 when he accepted an appointment to the provincial Supreme Court.

Saunders died at home in Summerside on October 18, 1943.
