= William Campbell (Prince Edward Island politician) =

Canadian politician

William Campbell (January 12, 1836 – December 15, 1909) was a farmer and political figure in Prince Edward Island. He represented 1st Queens in the Legislative Assembly of Prince Edward Island from 1873 to 1886 and from 1898 to 1900 and 4th Prince from 1896 to 1897 as a Conservative member.

== Biography ==
Campbell was born in New London, Prince Edward Island, the son of James Campbell and Elizabeth Montgomery, and educated there. In 1863, he married Miss E. McLeod; after her death, he married Elizabeth Sutherland in 1874. He served as lieutenant-colonel for the county militia. Campbell was first elected to the provincial assembly after Peter Sinclair resigned his seat to run for a seat in the House of Commons. He served in the province's Executive Council as Commissioner of Public Works. Campbell was defeated when he ran for reelection in 1886. He was reelected to the assembly in an 1886 by-election held following the death of Alexander Laird but defeated in the general election that followed. Campbell was elected again in an 1898 by-election held after Alexander Bannerman Warburton was named to the bench; he was defeated in the 1900 general election.

He died in Seaview at the age of 73.
