= Jeremiah Blanchard =

Canadian politician

Jérémie "Jeremiah" Blanchard (September 27, 1859 – March 17, 1939) was a farmer and political figure in Prince Edward Island. He represented 1st Prince in the Legislative Assembly of Prince Edward Island from 1893 to 1897 as a Conservative and from 1922 to 1931 as a Liberal.

He was born in Rustico, Prince Edward Island, the son of Sylvestre Blanchard and Virginie Doucette. He learned the trade of carpentry from his father. Blanchard was married twice: to Domitilde Gallant in 1880 and to Leonie Gomeau (née DesRoches) in 1921. He was an unsuccessful candidate for a seat in the provincial assembly in 1890 and in 1919. He served in the province's Executive Council as a minister without portfolio.

His grandson Elmer Blanchard also served in the provincial assembly.
