= Francis Kelly (Canadian politician) =

Canadian politician

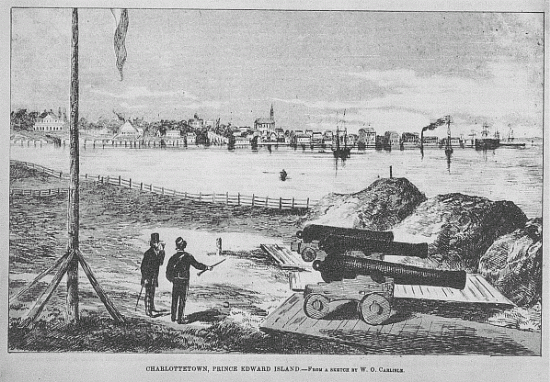
Sketch of Charlottetown, capital of Prince Edward Island, in the late 19th century.

Francis Kelly (May 1806 – 19 April 1879) was a Canadian surveyor, business agent, farmer, and politician, noted for his long service as a member of the government of Prince Edward Island (PEI), and as an advocate for Catholic issues on PEI during the period of Canadian Confederation.

== His Life Prior to Politics ==
Born in Mulloloughan, County Monaghan, Ireland, Kelly was schooled in Dublin, and worked as a teacher and law clerk before emigrating to PEI with his wife, Catherine Lennon, in May, 1835, ten years before the Great Famine. Kelly settled at Fort Augustus, Price Edward Island, not far from the province's capital of Charlottetown. Kelly was hired by the Reverend John McDonald as an assayer and business agent, for whom he worked until May 1846.

== Political career ==
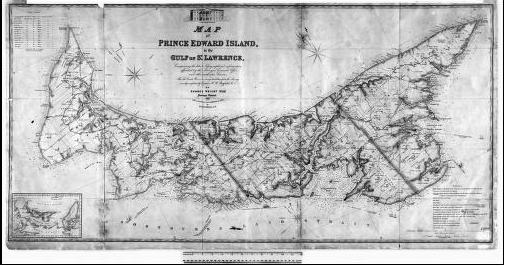
An 1874 Crown map of Prince Edward Island, similar to those Kelly would examine as Chief Commissioner of Crown Lands.

Interested in politics, Kelly made two attempts at election to the House of Assembly for the third district of Queens County in the 1840s. He was defeated in those first two attempts, but was elected to the Legislative Assembly in 1858, seven years after responsible government had been established. The assembly, having at that time thirty members, was housed in the recently completed Province House. Kelly was elected as the running mate of the quick-tempered Liberal George Coles, who had recently become the first Premier of Prince Edward Island. Kelly maintained his seat (with the exception of the 1872 session, when the province's government fell over a bankrupting railway policy) until his death in 1879.

Kelly's involvement in politics went beyond his being a member of the legislature. Kelly was also a Justice of the Peace, Postmaster, Taker of Affidavits for the Supreme Court, Commissioner for Taking Recognizance of Bail, member of the Executive Council, Land Survyer and Commissioner of Crown Lands, member of the Board of Education, and captain of the Fort Augustus Rifles (the local militia).

=== Political Positions ===
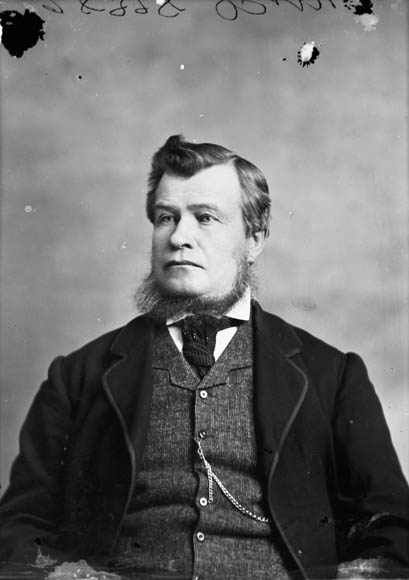
James Colledge Pope, to whose Conservative Party Kelly defected in 1870.

A devoted Catholic, Kelly argued for educational concessions for Catholics in the province. Kelly had been in Dublin when Daniel O'Connell won his campaign for Catholic Emancipation in Great Britain, and tension over the place of Catholics in the British Empire also arose in Charlottetown. In 1870, the Liberal government of the province was split over whether or not to publicly fund St. Dunstan's College, a Catholic school. Kelly, strongly in favour of a separate school system, left the Liberal party over the issue, in spite of the fact that current Liberal leader Robert Poore Haythorne was also a supporter. Kelly, along with six other Liberal party Catholics, joined James Colledge Pope's Tories. The defection brought the Tories to power. Pope rewarded Kelly by giving him the position of Chief Commissioner of Crown Lands, a post he kept for two years, and regained through 1875 to 1876, until the school issue cost Pope his control of the House.

Kelly, like most of his former Liberal colleagues, opposed Confederation. Even though the Tories were seen as less hostile to Confederation, Kelly and Pope (a delegate at the Charlottetown Conference) both voted for the 1866 "no terms" resolution in response to the Quebec Conference. Both politicians also voted for the "better terms" resolution in 1873, by which time Confederation had come to be viewed both as an economic necessity, and as a benefit for Prince Edward Island's Catholics. Pope and Kelly won their better terms, as the government in Ottawa increased their annual subsidy offer by $25 000. Prince Edward Island joined Confederation July 1 of that year.

Kelly also supported land reform legislation, a Liberal position with popular support.

== Death ==
Kelly died in 1879, at the age of seventy-six. Tory Donald A. MacDonald replaced his Assembly seat in a May by-election.

His son Lucius later represented 3rd Queens in the provincial assembly.
