= James R. MacLean =

Canadian politician

James Roderick MacLean (April 9, 1842 – March 26, 1903) was a merchant, notary public and political figure in Prince Edward Island. He represented 1st Kings in the Legislative Assembly of Prince Edward Island from 1869 to 1879 and from 1883 to 1900 as a Liberal member.

He was born at East Point, the son of Alexander MacLean and Mary MacDonald, of Scottish descent, and was educated in Prince Edward Island. In 1870, he married Mary Armstrong, the daughter of Joseph Wightman. McLean served as a governor for Prince of Wales College. He served on the provincial Executive Council from 1872 to 1873. He was named Commissioner of Public Works on the Executive Council in 1891.

McLean married Marcella MacDonald around 1894.
