= John Alexander MacDonald (Prince Edward Island politician) =

Canadian politician

John Alexander MacDonald (October 21, 1838 – 1905) was a farmer and political figure in Prince Edward Island. He represented 3rd Prince in the Legislative Assembly of Prince Edward Island from 1870 to 1900 as a Conservative member.

He was born in Bedeque, Prince Edward Island, the son of Angus McDonald. In 1875, he married Annie C. McKelvie. MacDonald was a justice of the peace in Indian River. He served as chairman of the board of railway appraisers and was a governor for Wales' College. He was speaker for the assembly from 1879 to 1891. MacDonald also served as a member of the Executive Council.

His nephew Bernard Donald McLellan also served as speaker for the provincial assembly. His uncle Bernard Donald Macdonald was bishop of Charlottetown. His daughter Bernice married Adrien Arsenault.
