= Daniel MacNeill =

Canadian politician

Daniel Francis MacNeill (August 30, 1885 – September 24, 1946) was a businessperson and political figure on Prince Edward Island. He represented 5th Prince in the Legislative Assembly of Prince Edward Island from 1944 to 1946 as a Progressive Conservative.

He was born in Summerside, Prince Edward Island, the son of James A. MacNeill and Sarah Eliza. MacNeill married Pearl Tamlyn. MacNeill was an unsuccessful candidate for a seat in the provincial assembly in 1933 and 1939. He took over the operation of the family farm machinery company. MacNeill was also deputy chief of the Summerside Fire Department and served 14 years as a member of Summerside town council. He died in office at the Prince County Hospital in Summerside at the age of 61.
