= George Bentley (politician) =

Canadian politician

George Whitefield Whitlock Bentley (December 1, 1842 – April 8, 1909) was a merchant, farmer and political figure in Prince Edward Island, Canada. He represented 4th Prince in the Legislative Assembly of Prince Edward Island from 1879 to 1893 as a Conservative member. Born in Margate, Prince Edward Island, he was the son of Thomas Bentley and Hannah Smith, and was educated there. In 1870, he married Emma Jane Dennis. He served on the Executive Council as Commissioner of Public Works from 1887 to 1890 and as Provincial Secretary-treasurer and Commissioner of Crown Lands from 1890 to 1891. He was defeated when he ran for re-election in 1893. His son, Whitefield Bentley, also served in the legislative assembly when he grew up.
