= Peter Sinclair Sr. =

Canadian politician (1819–1906)

Peter Sinclair
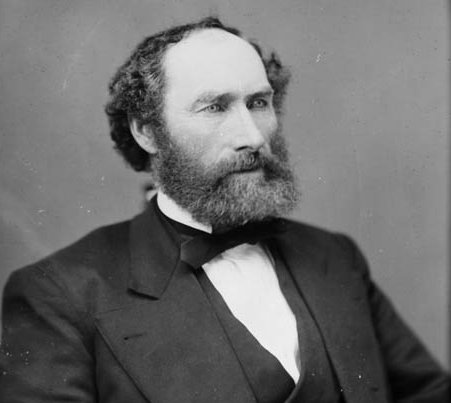

Member of the Canadian Parliament for Queen's County
- In office 1873–1878

Personal details
- Born: November 13, 1819 Glendaruel, Argyleshire, Scotland
- Died: October 9, 1906 (aged 86) Summerfield, Prince Edward Island, Canada
- Party: Liberal

Peter Sinclair (November 18, 1819 – October 9, 1906) was a Scottish farmer and politician in Prince Edward Island. He represented Queen's County in the House of Commons of Canada from 1873 to 1878 as a Liberal member.

He was born in Glendaruel, Argyleshire, the son of Peter Sinclair, and came to Queens County, Prince Edward Island in 1840 with his mother. He was an unsuccessful candidate for a seat in the provincial assembly in 1858. Sinclair represented 1st Queens in the Legislative Assembly of Prince Edward Island from 1867 to 1873 and from 1882 to 1900 as a Liberal. He served in the Executive Council for the province as government leader from 1872 to 1873 and as minister without portfolio from 1891 to 1898. He was unsuccessful in a bid for reelection to the federal parliament in 1878. Sinclair married Margaret MacMurdo in 1879. He died in Summerfield in 1906.

His sons Peter and John Ewen also later served in the House of Commons of Canada.
