= Samuel Prowse =

Canadian politician

The Hon. Samuel Prowse
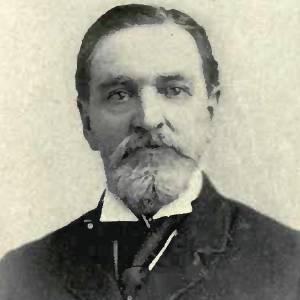

Senator for King's, Prince Edward Island
- In office September 14, 1889 – January 14, 1902
- Appointed by: John A. Macdonald

Member of the Legislative Assembly of Prince Edward Island for 4th Kings
- In office 1882–1889
- In office 1876–1882
- In office 1867–1873

Personal details
- Born: August 23, 1835 Charlottetown, Prince Edward Island
- Died: January 14, 1902 (aged 66)
- Party: Liberal-Conservative
- Cabinet: Prince Edward Island: Minister Without Portfolio (1876-1878 & 1879-1889)

Samuel Prowse (August 23, 1835 – January 14, 1902) was a Canadian merchant and politician.

Born in Charlottetown, Prince Edward Island, the son of William Prowse who moved from Devonshire, England, to Prince Edward Island in 1823, Prowse was educated in Charlottetown. In 1856, he married Eliza Willis; he married her sister Louise Willis in 1861 after the Eliza's death. Prowse was first elected to the Legislative Assembly of Prince Edward Island at the general election in 1867 for 4th Kings. In 1876 he was re-elected for the same seat, and accepted a seat in the Coalition Government on the School Question. He resigned his seat in the government in 1878, was re-elected in 1879, and accepted a seat in the Liberal-Conservative government. He was re-elected in 1882 and also in 1886. He sat in the House of Assembly until 1889. He was a member of the Executive Council from 1876 until 1878, and was reappointed in 1879. He was appointed to the Senate in September 1889 on the advice of John A. Macdonald, representing the senatorial division of King's, Prince Edward Island. A Liberal-Conservative, he served 12 years until his death in 1902.

His son Albert also served as a member of the Prince Edward Island assembly.
