= John Lefurgey =

Canadian politician

John Lefurgey (March 17, 1825 – May 5, 1891) was a merchant, ship builder and political figure in Prince Edward Island. He represented 5th Prince in the Legislative Assembly of Prince Edward Island from 1870 to 1890 as a Conservative member.

He was born in Bedeque, Prince Edward Island, the son of William Lefurgey, and educated there. Lefurgey married Doretha Reid. In 1886, he was named to the board of examiners for fish inspectors in Prince County. He served a number of terms as a member of the Executive Council and assisted in the passage of the Railway Bill. Lefurgey was a supporter of Confederation. He ran unsuccessfully for a seat in the federal parliament in 1882.

His daughter Rosara married William Arthur Brennan. His son Alfred served in the provincial assembly and House of Commons.
