= James E. MacDonald =

Canadian politician

James Emmanuel MacDonald (January 5, 1842 – October 1, 1903) was a merchant and political figure in Prince Edward Island. He represented 3rd Kings in the Legislative Assembly of Prince Edward Island from 1873 to 1882 and from 1890 to 1904 as a Conservative member.

He was born in Georgetown, Prince Edward Island, the son of Angus MacDonald, and was educated there. In 1864, he moved to Cardigan, where he entered into business with Hugh McDonald. Around 1876, he established his own ship building business. He married Georgina Stevens in 1877. MacDonald was first elected to the provincial assembly in 1873 after Augustine Colin Macdonald was elected to the House of Commons. He retired from politics in 1882 but was elected again in 1890 after the death of Hugh Lord McDonald. MacDonald served in the province's Executive Council as Commissioner of Public Works from 1890 to 1891, when he resigned from the council.

MacDonald was also a member of the Dairymen's Association for the province. He died in office in 1903 during a trip to Boston.
