= 1904 Prince Edward Island general election =

Canadian provincial election

← 1900	December 7, 1904	1908 →

All 30 seats in the Legislative Assembly of Prince Edward Island 16 seats needed for a majority
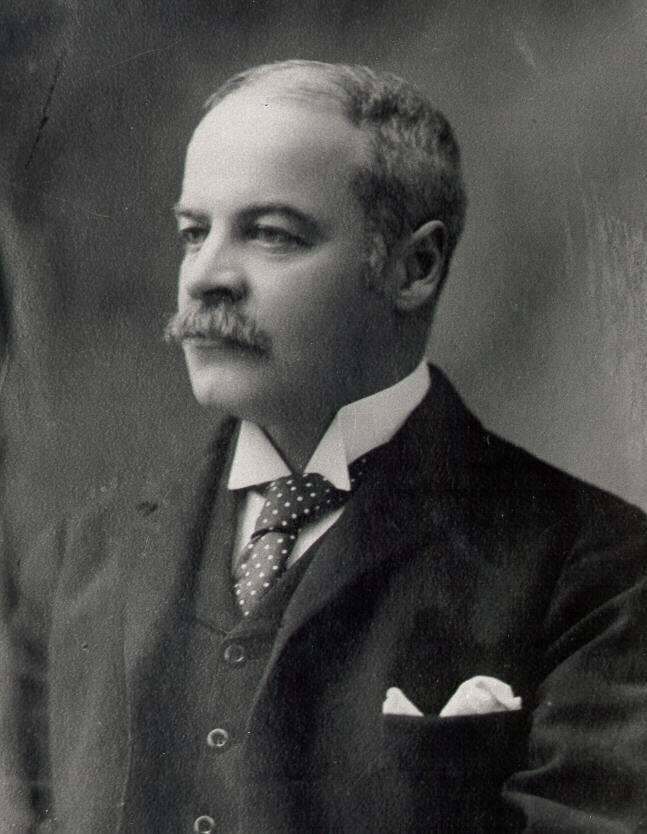

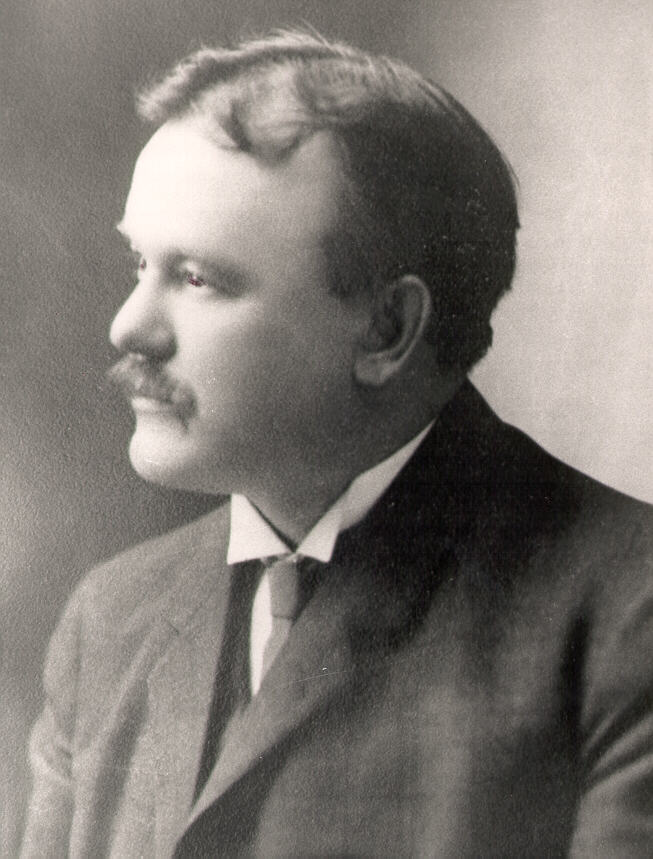
	First party	Second party
Leader	Arthur Peters	John A. Mathieson
Party	Liberal	Conservative
Leader since	1901	1903
Leader's seat	2nd Kings	5th Kings
Last election	22 seats, 53.5%	8 seats, 46.5%
Seats won	22	8
Seat change	Steady	Steady
Popular vote	17,011	14,427
Percentage	54.1%	45.9%
Swing	▲0.6pp	▼0.6pp
Premier before election
Arthur Peters
Liberal
Premier after election
Arthur Peters
Liberal

The 1904 Prince Edward Island general election was held in the Canadian province of Prince Edward Island on December 7, 1904.

The election was won by the governing Liberals, led by incumbent Premier Arthur Peters. Peters' own election in the district of 2nd Kings was almost in doubt, due to a tie vote of 515 votes each for him and his Conservative opponent; following a judicial recount, a by-election was held where Peters was acclaimed as the district's Assemblyman.

Peters died in January 1908, and was succeeded as Premier by Francis Haszard.

The seat counts of both parties in this election did not change.

One of the two members from each constituency is styled a Councillor, and the other an Assemblyman. In electoral contests Councillor candidates runs against Councillor candidates; Assemblyman candidates against Assemblyman candidates.

== Party Standings ==
Party	Party Leader	Seats		Popular Vote	
Party	Party Leader	1900	Elected	#	%
Liberal	Arthur Peters	22	22	17,011	54.1%
Conservative	John A. Mathieson	8	8	14,427	45.9%

== Members Elected ==
The Legislature of Prince Edward Island had two levels of membership from 1893 to 1996 - Assemblymen and Councillors. This was a holdover from when the Island had a bicameral legislature, the General Assembly and the Legislative Council.

In 1893, the Legislative Council was abolished and had its membership merged with the Assembly, though the two titles remained separate and were elected by different electoral franchises. Assembleymen were elected by all eligible voters of within a district, while Councillors were only elected by landowners within a district.

=== Kings ===
District	Assemblyman	Party	Councillor	Party
1st Kings	Austin L. Fraser	Conservative	John Kickham	Conservative
2nd Kings	Arthur Peters	Liberal	James McInnis	Liberal
3rd Kings	Walter A. O. Morson	Conservative	Patrick D. Bowlen	Liberal
4th Kings	Albert P. Prowse	Conservative	Murdock MacKinnon	Conservative
5th Kings	Archibald J. MacDonald	Conservative	John Alexander Mathieson	Conservative

=== Prince ===
District	Assemblyman	Party	Councillor	Party
1st Prince	Benjamin Gallant	Liberal	John Agnew	Liberal
2nd Prince	James W. Richards	Liberal	Alfred McWilliams	Liberal
3rd Prince	Joseph F. H. Arsenault	Liberal	Peter MacNutt	Liberal
4th Prince	Samuel E. Reid	Liberal	Joseph Read	Liberal
5th Prince	John M. Clarke	Liberal	George Godkin	Liberal

=== Queens ===
District	Assemblyman	Party	Councillor	Party
1st Queens	Matthew Smith	Liberal	George Simpson	Liberal
2nd Queens	Albert E. Douglas	Liberal	John McMillan	Liberal
3rd Queens	Leonard Wood	Conservative	James H. Cummiskey	Liberal
4th Queens	David P. Irving	Liberal	Francis L. Haszard	Liberal
5th Queens	James Warburton	Liberal	George E. Hughes	Liberal
