= 1900 Prince Edward Island general election =

Canadian provincial election

← 1897	December 12, 1900	1904 →

All 30 seats in the Legislative Assembly of Prince Edward Island 16 seats needed for a majority
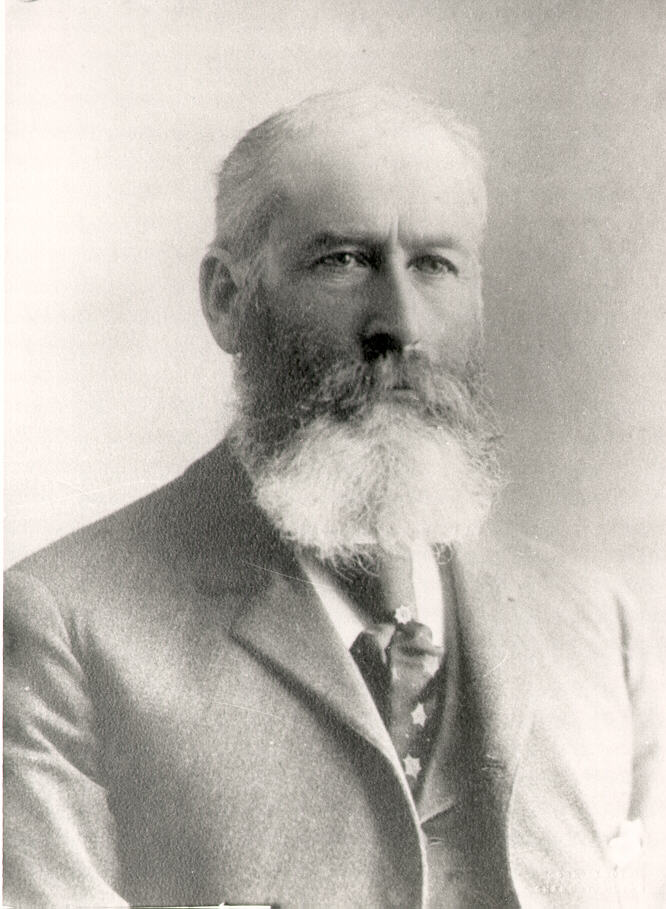
	First party	Second party
		CON
Leader	Donald Farquharson	Daniel Gordon
Party	Liberal	Conservative
Leader since	1898	1894
Leader's seat	2nd Queens	5th Kings
Last election	19 seats	11 seats
Seats won	22	8
Seat change	▲3	▼3
Popular vote	16,916	14,699
Percentage	53.5%	46.5%
Premier before election
Donald Farquharson
Liberal
Premier after election
Donald Farquharson
Liberal

The 1900 Prince Edward Island general election was held in the Canadian province of Prince Edward Island on December 12, 1900.

The election was won by the governing Liberals, led by incumbent Premier Donald Farquharson. Farquharson would later give up his office in 1901 to run successfully for federal office. He was succeeded by Arthur Peters, who previously served as the province's Attorney General.

The opposition Conservatives, led by Daniel Gordon, lost two seats. This was Gordon's final election before stepping down as Conservative leader in 1903 - he was succeeded by John A. Mathieson

== Party standings ==
Party	Party Leader	Seats		Popular Vote	
Party	Party Leader	1898	Elected	#	%
Liberal	Donald Farquharson	19	22	16,916	53.5%
Conservative	Daniel Gordon	11	8	14,699	46.5%

== Members Elected ==
The Legislature of Prince Edward Island had two levels of membership from 1893 to 1996 - Assemblymen and Councillors. This was a holdover from when the Island had a bicameral legislature, the General Assembly and the Legislative Council.

In 1893, the Legislative Council was abolished and had its membership merged with the Assembly, though the two titles remained separate and were elected by different electoral franchises. Assembleymen were elected by all eligible voters of within a district, while Councillors were only elected by landowners within a district.

=== Kings ===
District	Assemblyman	Party	Councillor	Party
1st Kings	John McLean	Conservative	John Kickham	Conservative
2nd Kings	Arthur Peters	Liberal	Anthony McLaughlin	Liberal
3rd Kings	Malcolm MacDonald	Liberal Conservative	James E. MacDonald	Conservative
4th Kings	John A. Mathieson	Conservative	Alexander F. Bruce Murdock MacKinnon (1900)	Liberal Conservative
5th Kings	Archibald J. MacDonald	Conservative	Daniel Gordon	Conservative

=== Prince ===
District	Assemblyman	Party	Councillor	Party
1st Prince	Benjamin Rogers	Liberal	Benjamin Gallant	Liberal
2nd Prince	James W. Richards	Liberal	Alfred McWilliams	Liberal
3rd Prince	Joseph F. Arsenault	Conservative	Peter MacNutt	Liberal
4th Prince	Samuel E. Reid	Liberal	Joseph Read	Liberal
5th Prince	George Godkin	Liberal	Robert C. McLeod	Liberal

=== Queens ===
District	Assemblyman	Party	Councillor	Party
1st Queens	Matthew Smith	Liberal	George Simpson	Liberal
2nd Queens	Edward Douglas	Liberal	Donald Farquharson	Liberal
3rd Queens	H. James Palmer	Liberal	James H. Cummiskey	Liberal
4th Queens	David P. Irving	Liberal	George Forbes	Liberal
5th Queens	John F. Whear	Liberal	George E. Hughes	Liberal
