= 34th General Assembly of Prince Edward Island =

The 34th General Assembly of Prince Edward Island was in session from March 19, 1901, to November 9, 1904. The Liberal Party led by Donald Farquharson formed the government. In December 1901, Arthur Peters became Liberal party leader and Premier.

There were four sessions of the 34th General Assembly:

Session	Start	End
1st	March 19, 1901	May 10, 1901
2nd	March 11, 1902	April 18, 1902
3rd	March 19, 1903	April 30, 1903
4th	March 24, 1904	April 30, 1904

Samuel E. Reid was elected speaker.

== Members ==
=== Kings ===
District	Assemblyman	Party	First elected / previously elected
1st Kings	John McLean	Conservative	1882, 1900
2nd Kings	Arthur Peters	Liberal	1893
3rd Kings	Malcolm MacDonald	Liberal	1900
3rd Kings	Walter A. O. Morson (1902)	Conservative	1902
4th Kings	John A. Mathieson	Conservative	1900
5th Kings	Archibald J. MacDonald	Conservative	1873, 1879
District	Councillor	Party	First elected / previously elected
1st Kings	John Kickham	Conservative	1897
2nd Kings	Anthony McLaughlin	Liberal	1893
2nd Kings	James McInnis (1904)	Liberal	1904
3rd Kings	James E. MacDonald	Conservative	1890
3rd Kings	Patrick Kelly (1904)	Conservative	1904
4th Kings	Alexander F. Bruce	Liberal	1900
4th Kings	Murdock MacKinnon (1902)	Conservative	1897, 1902
5th Kings	Daniel Gordon	Conservative	1876

=== Prince ===
District	Assemblyman	Party	First elected / previously elected
1st Prince	Benjamin Gallant	Liberal	1900
2nd Prince	James W. Richards	Liberal	1873
3rd Prince	Joseph F. Arsenault	Conservative	1895
4th Prince	Samuel E. Reid	Liberal	1899
5th Prince	George Godkin	Liberal	1893, 1900
District	Councillor	Party	First elected / previously elected
1st Prince	Benjamin Rogers	Liberal	1893, 1900
2nd Prince	Alfred McWilliams	Liberal	1891
3rd Prince	Peter MacNutt	Conservative	1897
4th Prince	Joseph Read	Liberal	1900
5th Prince	Robert C. McLeod	Liberal	1900

=== Queens ===
District	Assemblyman	Party	First elected / previously elected
1st Queens	Matthew Smith	Liberal	1900
2nd Queens	Edward Douglas	Liberal	1900
3rd Queens	H. James Palmer	Liberal	1900
4th Queens	David P. Irving	Liberal	1900
5th Queens	John F. Whear	Liberal	1900
5th Queens	James Warburton (1904)	Liberal	1904
District	Councillor	Party	First elected / previously elected
1st Queens	George Simpson	Liberal	1900
2nd Queens	Donald Farquharson	Liberal	1876
2nd Queens	Dougald Currie (1902)	Conservative	1902
3rd Queens	James H. Cummiskey	Liberal	1891
4th Queens	George Forbes	Liberal	1886
5th Queens	George E. Hughes	Liberal	1900
