= 35th General Assembly of Prince Edward Island =

The 35th General Assembly of Prince Edward Island was in session from February 8, 1904, to October 15, 1908. The Liberal Party led by Arthur Peters formed the government. On February 1, 1908, Francis Haszard became Liberal party leader and Premier after Peters died in office.

There were four sessions of the 35th General Assembly:

Session	Start	End
1st	February 8, 1905	May 5, 1905
2nd	March 13, 1906	April 21, 1906
3rd	February 19, 1907	April 13, 1907
4th	February 25, 1908	April 15, 1908

Albert E. Douglas was elected speaker.

== Members ==
=== Kings ===
District	Assemblyman	Party	First elected / previously elected
1st Kings	Austin L. Fraser	Conservative	1904
2nd Kings	Arthur Peters	Liberal	1893
3rd Kings	Walter A. O. Morson	Conservative	1902
4th Kings	Albert P. Prowse	Conservative	1899, 1904
5th Kings	Archibald J. MacDonald	Conservative	1873, 1879
District	Councillor	Party	First elected / previously elected
1st Kings	John Kickham	Conservative	1897
2nd Kings	James McInnis	Liberal	1904
3rd Kings	Patrick D. Bowland	Liberal	1904
4th Kings	Murdock MacKinnon	Conservative	1897, 1902
5th Kings	John Alexander Mathieson	Conservative	1900

=== Prince ===
District	Assemblyman	Party	First elected / previously elected
1st Prince	Benjamin Gallant	Liberal	1900
2nd Prince	James W. Richards	Liberal	1873
3rd Prince	Joseph F. H. Arsenault	Liberal	1904
4th Prince	Samuel E. Reid	Liberal	1899
5th Prince	John M. Clarke	Liberal	1904
District	Councillor	Party	First elected / previously elected
1st Prince	John Agnew	Liberal	1904
2nd Prince	Alfred McWilliams	Liberal	1891
3rd Prince	Peter MacNutt	Conservative	1897
4th Prince	Joseph Read	Liberal	1900
5th Prince	George Godkin	Liberal	1893, 1900

=== Queens ===
District	Assemblyman	Party	First elected / previously elected
1st Queens	Matthew Smith	Liberal	1900
2nd Queens	Albert E. Douglas	Liberal	1900
3rd Queens	Leonard Wood	Conservative	1904
4th Queens	David P. Irving	Liberal	1900
5th Queens	James Warburton	Liberal	1904
District	Councillor	Party	First elected / previously elected
1st Queens	George Simpson	Liberal	1900
1st Queens	Murdock Kennedy (1906)	Conservative	1906
2nd Queens	John McMillan	Liberal	1904
3rd Queens	James H. Cummiskey	Liberal	1891
4th Queens	Francis L. Haszard	Liberal	1904
5th Queens	George E. Hughes	Liberal	1900
