= 1908 Prince Edward Island general election =

Canadian provincial election

← 1904	November 18, 1908	1912 →

All 30 seats in the Legislative Assembly of Prince Edward Island 16 seats needed for a majority
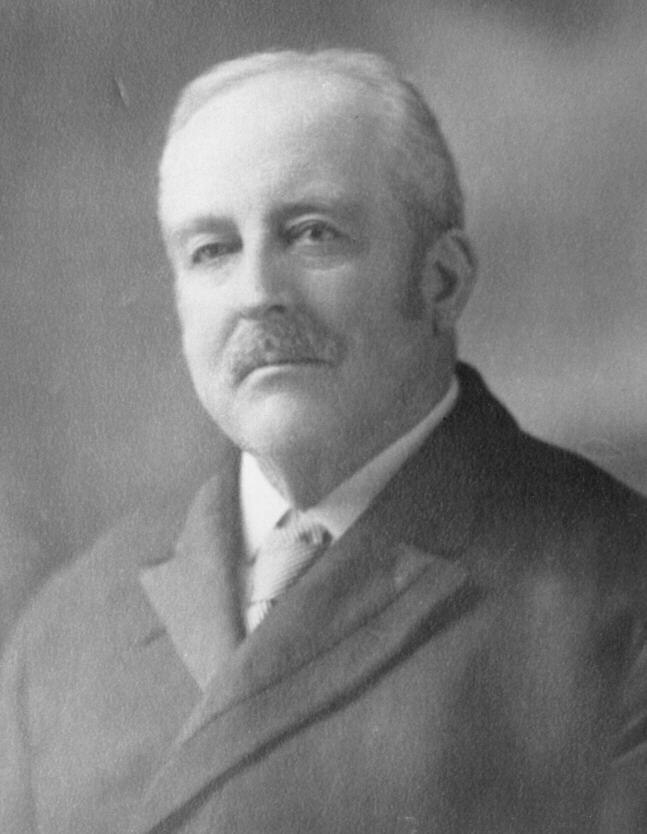

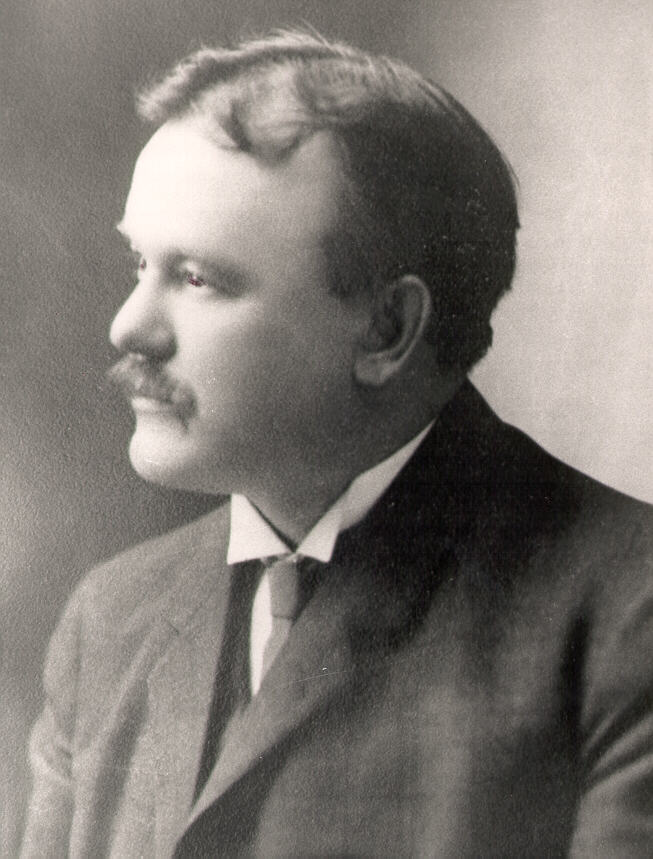
	First party	Second party
Leader	Francis Haszard	John A. Mathieson
Party	Liberal	Conservative
Leader since	1908	1903
Leader's seat	4th Queens	5th Kings
Last election	22 seats, 54.1%	8 seats, 45.9%
Seats won	17	13
Seat change	▼5	▲5
Popular vote	15,488	14,541
Percentage	51.6%	48.4%
Swing	▼2.5pp	▲2.5pp
Premier before election
Francis Haszard
Liberal
Premier after election
Francis Haszard
Liberal

The 1908 Prince Edward Island general election was held in the Canadian province of Prince Edward Island on November 18, 1908.

The election was won by the governing Liberals, led by incumbent Premier Francis Haszard. Haszard had taken over from his predecessor, Arthur Peters, following his death in January 1908.

Haszard resigned as Premier in 1911 following appointment to the province's Supreme Court, and he was succeeded as Premier by H. James Palmer. Due to his designation as Premier, Palmer ran in a by-election in his district of 3rd Queens; traditionally, the Opposition does not run a candidate in these triggered by-elections, but the Conservatives did in the December, 1911 by-election and defeated Palmer in his own district.

The opposition Conservatives, led by John A. Mathieson, gained five seats in this election.

== Party Standings ==
Party	Party Leader	Seats		Popular Vote	
Party	Party Leader	1904	Elected	#	%
Liberal	Francis Haszard	22	17	15,488	51.6%
Conservative	John A. Mathieson	8	13	14,541	48.4%

== Members Elected ==
The Legislature of Prince Edward Island had two levels of membership from 1893 to 1996 - Assemblymen and Councillors. This was a holdover from when the Island had a bicameral legislature, the General Assembly and the Legislative Council.

In 1893, the Legislative Council was abolished and had its membership merged with the Assembly, though the two titles remained separate and were elected by different electoral franchises. Assembleymen were elected by all eligible voters of within a district, while Councillors were only elected by landowners within a district.

=== Kings ===
District	Assemblyman	Party	Councillor	Party
1st Kings	John McLean	Conservative	Lauchlin MacDonald	Liberal
2nd Kings	Robert Cox	Liberal	James McInnis	Liberal
3rd Kings	Walter A. O. Morson	Conservative	John A. MacDonald	Conservative
4th Kings	Albert P. Prowse	Conservative	Murdock MacKinnon	Conservative
5th Kings	Archibald J. MacDonald	Conservative	John Alexander Mathieson	Conservative

=== Prince ===
District	Assemblyman	Party	Councillor	Party
1st Prince	Benjamin Gallant	Liberal	John Agnew	Liberal
2nd Prince	John Richards	Liberal	Alfred McWilliams	Liberal
3rd Prince	Aubin Edmond Arsenault	Conservative	Hector Dobie	Conservative
4th Prince	James Kennedy	Conservative	Joseph Read	Liberal
5th Prince	James A. MacNeill	Conservative	J. Edward Wyatt	Conservative

=== Queens ===
District	Assemblyman	Party	Councillor	Party
1st Queens	Matthew Smith	Liberal	Murdock Kennedy	Conservative
2nd Queens	William Laird	Liberal	John McMillan	Liberal
3rd Queens	Herbert James Palmer	Liberal	James H. Cummiskey	Liberal
4th Queens	David P. Irving	Liberal	Francis L. Haszard	Liberal
5th Queens	James Warburton	Liberal	George E. Hughes	Liberal
