= 36th General Assembly of Prince Edward Island =

The 36th General Assembly of Prince Edward Island was in session from February 2, 1908, to December 5, 1911. The Liberal Party led by Francis Haszard formed the government. After Haszard accepted an appointment to the province's Supreme Court, Herbert James Palmer became Liberal party leader and Premier in May 1911; when he ran for reelection on November 15, 1911, he was defeated and the Liberals lost their majority, forcing an election.

There were three sessions of the 36th General Assembly:

Session	Start	End
1st	February 2, 1908	March 22, 1908
2nd	February 15, 1910	April 8, 1910
3rd	March 7, 1911	April 26, 1911

Matthew Smith was elected speaker.

== Members ==
=== Kings ===
District	Assemblyman	Party	First elected / previously elected
1st Kings	John McLean	Conservative	1882, 1900
2nd Kings	Robert Cox	Liberal	1908
3rd Kings	Walter A. O. Morson	Conservative	1902
3rd Kings	John A. Dewar (1910)	Conservative	1910
4th Kings	Albert P. Prowse	Conservative	1899, 1904
5th Kings	Archibald J. MacDonald	Conservative	1873, 1879
District	Councillor	Party	First elected / previously elected
1st Kings	Lauchlin MacDonald	Liberal	1875, 1908
2nd Kings	James McInnis	Liberal	1904
3rd Kings	John A. MacDonald	Conservative	1908
4th Kings	Murdock MacKinnon	Conservative	1897, 1902
5th Kings	John Alexander Mathieson	Conservative	1900

=== Prince ===
District	Assemblyman	Party	First elected / previously elected
1st Prince	Benjamin Gallant	Liberal	1900
2nd Prince	John Richards	Liberal	1908
3rd Prince	Aubin Edmond Arsenault	Conservative	1908
4th Prince	James Kennedy	Conservative	1908
5th Prince	James A. MacNeill	Conservative	1908
District	Councillor	Party	First elected / previously elected
1st Prince	John Agnew	Liberal	1904
2nd Prince	Alfred McWilliams	Liberal	1891
3rd Prince	Hector Dobie	Conservative	1908
4th Prince	Joseph Read	Liberal	1900
4th Prince	Michael C. Delaney (1909)	Conservative	1909
5th Prince	J. Edward Wyatt	Conservative	1908

=== Queens ===
District	Assemblyman	Party	First elected / previously elected
1st Queens	Matthew Smith	Liberal	1900
1st Queens	Cyrus Crosby (1909)	Liberal	1909
2nd Queens	William Laird	Liberal	1908
2nd Queens	George W. McPhee (1911)	Liberal	1911
3rd Queens	Herbert James Palmer	Liberal	1900, 1908
3rd Queens	George F. Dewar (1911)	Conservative	1911
4th Queens	David P. Irving	Liberal	1900
5th Queens	James Warburton	Liberal	1904
District	Councillor	Party	First elected / previously elected
1st Queens	Murdock Kennedy	Conservative	1906
2nd Queens	John McMillan	Liberal	1904
3rd Queens	James H. Cummiskey	Liberal	1891
4th Queens	Francis L. Haszard	Liberal	1904
4th Queens	Alexander Macphail (1911)	Conservative	1911
5th Queens	George E. Hughes	Liberal	1900
