= 33rd General Assembly of Prince Edward Island =

Session from April 5, 1898 - November 12, 1900

The 33rd General Assembly of Prince Edward Island was in session from April 5, 1898, to November 12, 1900. The Liberal Party led by Alexander Bannerman Warburton formed the government. In August 1898, Donald Farquharson became Liberal party leader and Premier.

There were three sessions of the 33rd General Assembly:

Session	Start	End
1st	April 5, 1898	May 14, 1898
2nd	April 17, 1899	May 19, 1899
3rd	May 28, 1900	June 19, 1900

James H. Cummiskey was elected speaker.

== Members ==
=== Kings ===
District	Assemblyman	Party	First elected / previously elected
1st Kings	James R. McLean	Liberal	1876, 1882
2nd Kings	Arthur Peters	Liberal	1893
3rd Kings	Cyrus Shaw	Conservative	1886
4th Kings	Donald A. MacKinnon	Liberal	1893
4th Kings	Albert P. Prowse (1899)	Conservative	1899
5th Kings	Archibald J. MacDonald	Conservative	1873, 1879
District	Councillor	Party	First elected / previously elected
1st Kings	John Kickham	Conservative	1897
2nd Kings	Anthony McLaughlin	Liberal	1893
3rd Kings	James E. MacDonald	Conservative	1890
4th Kings	Murdock MacKinnon	Conservative	1897
5th Kings	Daniel Gordon	Conservative	1876

=== Prince ===
District	Assemblyman	Party	First elected / previously elected
1st Prince	Edward Hackett	Conservative	1876, 1897
1st Prince	Meddie Gallant (1898)	Liberal	1898
1st Prince	Henry Pineau (1899)	Conservative	1899
2nd Prince	James W. Richards	Liberal	1873
3rd Prince	Joseph F. Arsenault	Conservative	1895
4th Prince	John H. Bell	Liberal	1886
4th Prince	Samuel E. Reid (1899)	Liberal	1899
5th Prince	Alfred A. LeFurgey	Liberal	1897
5th Prince	Gilbert DesRoches (1899)	Independent	1899
District	Councillor	Party	First elected / previously elected
1st Prince	James Birch	Liberal	1897
2nd Prince	Alfred McWilliams	Liberal	1891
3rd Prince	John A. MacDonald	Conservative	1873, 1876, 1893
4th Prince	Peter MacNutt	Liberal	1897
5th Prince	Angus McMillan	Liberal	1876, 1890

=== Queens ===
District	Assemblyman	Party	First elected / previously elected
1st Queens	Alexander Bannerman Warburton	Liberal	1888, (Note: 4th Queens) 1891
1st Queens	William Campbell (1898)	Independent	1898
2nd Queens	Joseph Wise	Liberal	1886, 1893
2nd Queens	Albert E. Douglas (1900)	Liberal	1900
3rd Queens	Frederick Peters	Liberal	1890
4th Queens	Hector C. McDonald	Liberal	1890
4th Queens	Angus A. MacLean (1899)	Independent	1899
5th Queens	Lemuel E. Prowse	Liberal	1893
District	Councillor	Party	First elected / previously elected
1st Queens	Peter Sinclair	Liberal	1873, 1882
2nd Queens	Donald Farquharson	Liberal	1876
3rd Queens	James H. Cummiskey	Liberal	1891
4th Queens	George Forbes	Liberal	1886
5th Queens	Benjamin Rogers	Liberal	1893
