= 32nd General Assembly of Prince Edward Island =

The 32nd General Assembly of Prince Edward Island was in session from March 28, 1894, to June 25, 1897. The Liberal Party led by Frederick Peters formed the government.

In late 1893, after the dissolution of the 31st General Assembly, the Legislative Council was combined with the House of Assembly into a unicameral body known as the Legislative Assembly. An assemblyman and councillor was elected from each electoral district.

There were four sessions of the 32nd General Assembly:

Session	Start	End
1st	March 28, 1894	May 9, 1894
2nd	March 21, 1895	April 19, 1895
3rd	March 24, 1896	April 30, 1896
4th	March 30, 1897	May 1, 1897

James H. Cummiskey was elected speaker.

== Members ==
=== Kings ===
District	Assemblyman	Party	First elected / previously elected
1st Kings	James R. McLean	Liberal	1876, 1882
2nd Kings	Arthur Peters	Liberal	1893
3rd Kings	Cyrus Shaw	Conservative	1886
4th Kings	Donald A. MacKinnon	Liberal	1893
5th Kings	Archibald J. MacDonald	Conservative	1873, 1879
District	Councillor	Party	First elected / previously elected
1st Kings	A.D. Robertson	Liberal	1891
2nd Kings	Anthony McLaughlin	Liberal	1893
3rd Kings	James E. MacDonald	Conservative	1890
4th Kings	George B. Aitken	Liberal	1893
5th Kings	Daniel Gordon	Conservative	1876

=== Prince ===
District	Assemblyman	Party	First elected / previously elected
1st Prince	J. Blanchard	Conservative	1893
2nd Prince	James W. Richards	Liberal	1873
3rd Prince	Joseph Octave Arsenault	Conservative	1873
3rd Prince	S.E. Gallant (1895)	Conservative	1895
4th Prince	John H. Bell	Liberal	1886
5th Prince	George Godkin	Liberal	1893
District	Councillor	Party	First elected / previously elected
1st Prince	Benjamin Rogers	Liberal	1893
2nd Prince	Alfred McWilliams	Liberal	1891
3rd Prince	John A. MacDonald	Conservative	1873, 1876, 1893
4th Prince	Alexander Laird	Liberal	1893
4th Prince	William Campbell (1896)	Conservative	1873, (Note: 1st Queens) 1896
5th Prince	Angus McMillan	Liberal	1876, 1890

=== Queens ===
District	Assemblyman	Party	First elected / previously elected
1st Queens	Alexander Bannerman Warburton	Liberal	1888, (Note: 4th Queens) 1891
2nd Queens	Joseph Wise	Liberal	1886, 1893
3rd Queens	Frederick Peters	Liberal	1890
4th Queens	Hector C. McDonald	Liberal	1890
5th Queens	Lemuel E. Prowse	Liberal	1893
District	Councillor	Party	First elected / previously elected
1st Queens	Peter Sinclair	Liberal	1873, 1882
2nd Queens	Donald Farquharson	Liberal	1876
3rd Queens	James H. Cummisky	Liberal	1891
4th Queens	George Forbes	Liberal	1886
5th Queens	Benjamin Rogers	Liberal	1893
