= 38th General Assembly of Prince Edward Island =

The 38th General Assembly of Prince Edward Island was in session from March 29, 1916, to June 26, 1919. The Conservative Party led by John Alexander Mathieson formed the government. Aubin-Edmond Arsenault succeeded Mathieson as Premier and party leader in 1917.

John S. Martin was elected speaker. Albert P. Prowse became speaker in 1918.

There were five sessions of the 38th General Assembly:

Session	Start	End
1st	March 29, 1916	May 4, 1916
2nd	August 4, 1916	August 5, 1916
3rd	March 15, 1917	April 26, 1917
4th	March 26, 1918	April 26, 1918
5th	April 2, 1919	May 4, 1919

== Members ==
=== Kings ===
District	Assemblyman	Party	First elected / previously elected
1st Kings	Augustine A. MacDonald	Conservative	1915
2nd Kings	Harvey D. McEwen	Conservative	1915
3rd Kings	John A. Dewar	Conservative	1910
4th Kings	Albert P. Prowse	Conservative	1899, 1904
5th Kings	Roderick J. McLellan	Conservative	1915
District	Councillor	Party	First elected / previously elected
1st Kings	John McLean	Conservative	1882, 1900
1st Kings	Harry D. McLean (1916)	Conservative	1916
2nd Kings	James D. McInnis	Liberal	1904, 1915
2nd Kings	R. J. MacDonald (1917)	Conservative	1917
3rd Kings	James J. Johnston	Liberal	1915
4th Kings	Murdock MacKinnon	Conservative	1897, 1902
5th Kings	John Alexander Mathieson	Conservative	1900
5th Kings	James David Stewart (1917)	Conservative	1917

=== Prince ===
District	Assemblyman	Party	First elected / previously elected
1st Prince	Benjamin Gallant	Liberal	1900, 1915
2nd Prince	Albert Charles Saunders	Liberal	1915
3rd Prince	Aubin Edmond Arsenault	Conservative	1908
4th Prince	John Howatt Bell	Liberal	1886, 1915
5th Prince	James A. MacNeill	Conservative	1908
District	Councillor	Party	First elected / previously elected
1st Prince	Charles E. Dalton	Conservative	1912
2nd Prince	William H. Dennis	Liberal	1915
3rd Prince	Alfred E. MacLean	Liberal	1915
4th Prince	Walter Lea	Liberal	1915
5th Prince	Hubert Howatt	Liberal	1915

=== Queens ===
District	Assemblyman	Party	First elected / previously elected
1st Queens	Murdock Kennedy	Conservative	1906
2nd Queens	George E. Hughes	Liberal	1900, (Note: 5th Queens (Councillor)) 1915
3rd Queens	Leonard Wood	Conservative	1904, 1915
4th Queens	John S. Martin	Conservative	1912
5th Queens	James Paton	Conservative	1915
District	Councillor	Party	First elected / previously elected
1st Queens	Alexander McNevin	Conservative	1915
2nd Queens	John McMillan	Liberal	1904, 1915
3rd Queens	David McDonald	Liberal	1915
4th Queens	George Forbes	Liberal	1886, 1915
5th Queens	Stephen R. Jenkins	Conservative	1912
