= 1974 Prince Edward Island general election =

Canadian provincial election

| ← 1970 | April 29, 1974 | 1978 → |

All 32 seats in the Legislative Assembly of Prince Edward Island 17 seats needed for a majority
| | First party | Second party |
|---|---|---|
| | Lib | PC |
| Leader | Alex Campbell | Melvin McQuaid |
| Party | Liberal | Progressive Conservative |
| Leader since | December 11, 1965 | February 3, 1973 |
| Leader's seat | 5th Prince | 1st Kings |
| Last election | 27 seats, 58.4% | 5 seats, 41.6% |
| Seats won | 26 | 6 |
| Seat change | ▼1 | ▲1 |
| Popular vote | 64,212 | 47,470 |
| Percentage | 54.0% | 39.9% |
| Swing | ▼4.4pp | ▼1.7pp |
- Seats won by each party per district. Voters elect two members (one Councillor and Assemblyman) from each of the 16 districts.
Premier before election
Alex Campbell
Liberal
Premier after election
Alex Campbell
Liberal

The 1974 Prince Edward Island general election was held on April 29, 1974.

This election was the first that the New Democratic Party contested as a provincial party on PEI, and the first third party to run candidates since the Co-operative Commonwealth Federation, the NDP's predecessor, contested their last election in 1951.

== Party standings ==
↓
| 26 | 6 |
| Liberal | PC |

| Party | Party Leader | Seats | | | Popular Vote | | |
| Party | Party Leader | 1966 | Elected | Change | # | % | Change |
|---|---|---|---|---|---|---|---|
| Liberal | Alex Campbell | 27 | 26 | -1 | 64,212 | 54.0% | -4.4% |
| Progressive Conservative | Melvin McQuaid | 5 | 6 | +1 | 47,470 | 39.9% | -1.7% |
| New Democratic | Aquinas Ryan | - | 0 | - | 7,327 | 6.2% | +6.2% |

Popular vote
| Liberal | 53.96% |
| PC | 39.89% |
| New Democratic | 6.16% |

Seats summary
| Liberal | 81.25% |
| PC | 18.75% |

== Members elected ==
The Legislature of Prince Edward Island had two levels of membership from 1893 to 1996 - Assemblymen and Councillors. This was a holdover from when the Island had a bicameral legislature, the General Assembly and the Legislative Council.

In 1893, the Legislative Council was abolished and had its membership merged with the Assembly, though the two titles remained separate and were elected by different electoral franchises. Assembleymen were elected by all eligible voters of within a district. Before 1963, Councillors were only elected by landowners within a district, but afterward were elected in the same manner as Assemblymen.

=== Kings ===
| District | Assemblyman | Party | Councillor | Party |
|---|---|---|---|---|
| 1st Kings | Bruce L. Stewart | Liberal | Melvin J. McQuaid | Progressive; Conservative Liberal |
| 2nd Kings | Walter Dingwell | Progressive; Conservative | Leo Rossiter | Progressive; Conservative |
| 3rd Kings | William Bennett Campbell | Liberal | Bud Ings | Liberal |
| 4th Kings | Charles Fraser | Liberal | Gilbert R. Clements | Liberal |
| 5th Kings | Arthur J. MacDonald | Liberal | Waldron Lavers | Liberal |

=== Prince ===
| District | Assemblyman | Party | Councillor | Party |
|---|---|---|---|---|
| 1st Prince | Russell Perry | Liberal | Robert E. Campbell | Liberal |
| 2nd Prince | George R. Henderson | Liberal | Joshua MacArthur | Liberal Progressive; Conservative |
| 3rd Prince | William Gallant | Liberal | Edward Clark | Liberal |
| 4th Prince | Catherine Sophia Callbeck | Liberal | Frank Jardine | Liberal |
| 5th Prince | Earle Hickey | Liberal | Alexander B. Campbell | Liberal |

=== Queens ===
| District | Assemblyman | Party | Councillor | Party |
|---|---|---|---|---|
| 1st Queens | Jean Canfield | Liberal | Ralph Johnstone | Liberal |
| 2nd Queens | David Ford | Liberal | Lloyd MacPhail | Progressive; Conservative |
| 3rd Queens | Cecil A. Miller | Liberal | Levi McNally | Liberal |
| 4th Queens | Vernon MacIntyre | Progressive; Conservative | Daniel Compton | Progressive; Conservative |
| 5th Queens | Gordon L. Bennett | Liberal Progressive; Conservative | George Proud | Liberal |
| 6th Queens | Allison MacDonald | Liberal | John H. Maloney | Liberal |
