= 53rd General Assembly of Prince Edward Island =

The 53rd General Assembly of Prince Edward Island was in session from May 21, 1974, to May 28, 1978. The Liberal Party led by Alex Campbell formed the government.

Cecil A. Miller was elected speaker.

There were five sessions of the 53rd General Assembly:

Session	Start	End
1st	May 21, 1974	November 20, 1974
2nd	April 3, 1975	December 12, 1975
3rd	April 4, 1976	April 22, 1976
4th	March 10, 1977	May 13, 1977
5th	March 2, 1978	March 28, 1978

== Members ==
=== Kings ===
District	Assemblyman	Party	First elected / previously elected
1st Kings	Bruce L. Stewart	Liberal	1966
2nd Kings	Walter Dingwell	Progressive; Conservative	1959
3rd Kings	William Bennett Campbell	Liberal	1970
4th Kings	Charles Fraser	Liberal	1974
5th Kings	Arthur J. MacDonald	Liberal	1962, 1970
District	Councillor	Party	First elected / previously elected
1st Kings	Melvin J. McQuaid (Note: named judge)	Progressive; Conservative	1959, 1972
1st Kings	James Fay (1976)	Liberal	1976
2nd Kings	Leo Rossiter	Progressive; Conservative	1955
3rd Kings	Bud Ings	Liberal	1970
4th Kings	Gilbert R. Clements	Liberal	1970
5th Kings	Waldron Lavers	Liberal	1974

=== Prince ===
District	Assemblyman	Party	First elected / previously elected
1st Prince	Russell Perry	Liberal	1970
2nd Prince	George R. Henderson	Liberal	1974
3rd Prince	William Gallant (Note: resigned)	Liberal	1970
3rd Prince	Léonce Bernard (1975)	Liberal	1975
4th Prince	Catherine Sophia Callbeck	Liberal	1974
5th Prince	Earle Hickey	Liberal	1966
5th Prince	George McMahon (1976)	Progressive; Conservative	1976
District	Councillor	Party	First elected / previously elected
1st Prince	Robert E. Campbell	Liberal	1962
2nd Prince	Joshua MacArthur	Liberal	1970
2nd Prince	L. George Dewar (1976)	Progressive; Conservative	1955, (Note: Assemblyman) 1976
3rd Prince	Edward Clark	Liberal	1970
4th Prince	Frank Jardine	Liberal	1962
5th Prince	Alexander B. Campbell	Liberal	1965

=== Queens ===
District	Assemblyman	Party	First elected / previously elected
1st Queens	Jean Canfield	Liberal	1970
2nd Queens	David Ford	Liberal	1974
3rd Queens	Cecil A. Miller	Liberal	1966
4th Queens	Vernon MacIntyre (Note: died)	Progressive; Conservative	1974
4th Queens	J. Angus MacLean (1976)	Progressive; Conservative	1976
5th Queens	Gordon L. Bennett (Note: named Lieutenant-Governor)	Liberal	1966
5th Queens	James M. Lee (1975)	Progressive; Conservative	1975
6th Queens	Allison MacDonald	Liberal	1970
District	Councillor	Party	First elected / previously elected
1st Queens	Ralph Johnstone	Liberal	1970
2nd Queens	Lloyd MacPhail	Progressive; Conservative	1961
3rd Queens	Levi McNally	Liberal	1970
4th Queens	Daniel Compton	Progressive; Conservative	1970
5th Queens	George Proud	Liberal	1974
6th Queens	John H. Maloney	Liberal	1970
