= 1970 Prince Edward Island general election =

Canadian provincial election

← 1966	May 11, 1970	1974 →

All 32 seats in the Legislative Assembly of Prince Edward Island 17 seats needed for a majority
	First party	Second party
	Lib	PC
Leader	Alex Campbell	George Key
Party	Liberal	Progressive Conservative
Leader since	December 11, 1965	September 21, 1968
Leader's seat	5th Prince	Ran in 2nd Prince (lost)
Last election	17 seats, 50.5%	15 seats, 49.5%
Seats won	27	5
Seat change	▲10	▼10
Popular vote	64,484	46,015
Percentage	58.4%	41.6%
Swing	▲7.9pp	▼7.9pp
- Seats won by each party per district. Voters elect two members (one Councillor and Assemblyman) from each of the 16 districts.
Premier before election
Alex Campbell
Liberal
Premier after election
Alex Campbell
Liberal

The 1970 Prince Edward Island general election was held on May 11, 1970.

The incumbent Liberal government of Alex Campbell was easily re-elected, gaining a total of 7.9% in the popular vote on the Tories, who dropped by the identical amount, as only the two parties ran any candidates in both the 1970 and 1966 elections.

Jean Canfield, the first woman ever elected to the Legislative Assembly of Prince Edward Island, was a victorious candidate in 1st Queens in this election.

== Party standings ==
↓
27	5
Liberal	PC

Party	Party Leader	Seats			Popular Vote		
Party	Party Leader	1966	Elected	Change	#	%	Change
Liberal	Alex Campbell	17	27	+10	64,484	58.4%	+7.9%
Progressive Conservative	George Key	15	5	-10	46,015	41.6%	-7.9%

Popular vote
Liberal	58.36%
PC	41.64%

Seats summary
Liberal	84.38%
PC	15.62%

== Members elected ==
The Legislature of Prince Edward Island had two levels of membership from 1893 to 1996 - Assemblymen and Councillors. This was a holdover from when the Island had a bicameral legislature, the General Assembly and the Legislative Council.

In 1893, the Legislative Council was abolished and had its membership merged with the Assembly, though the two titles remained separate and were elected by different electoral franchises. Assembleymen were elected by all eligible voters of within a district. Before 1963, Councillors were only elected by landowners within a district, but afterward were elected in the same manner as Assemblymen.

=== Kings ===
District	Assemblyman	Party	Councillor	Party
1st Kings	Bruce L. Stewart	Liberal	Daniel J. MacDonald	Liberal Progressive; Conservative
2nd Kings	Walter Dingwell	Progressive; Conservative	Leo Rossiter	Progressive; Conservative
3rd Kings	William Bennett Campbell	Liberal	Bud Ings	Liberal
4th Kings	Lorne Bonnell	Liberal	Gilbert R. Clements	Liberal
5th Kings	Arthur J. MacDonald	Liberal	George J. Ferguson	Liberal

=== Prince ===
District	Assemblyman	Party	Councillor	Party
1st Prince	Russell Perry	Liberal	Robert E. Campbell	Liberal
2nd Prince	George Dewar	Progressive; Conservative	Joshua MacArthur	Liberal
3rd Prince	William Gallant	Liberal	Edward Clark	Liberal
4th Prince	Robert Schurman	Liberal	Frank Jardine	Liberal
5th Prince	Earle Hickey	Progressive; Conservative	Alexander B. Campbell	Liberal

=== Queens ===
District	Assemblyman	Party	Councillor	Party
1st Queens	Jean Canfield	Liberal	Ralph Johnstone	Liberal
2nd Queens	Sinclair Cutcliffe	Liberal	Lloyd MacPhail	Progressive; Conservative
3rd Queens	Cecil A. Miller	Liberal	Levi McNally	Liberal
4th Queens	J. Stewart Ross	Liberal	Daniel Compton	Progressive; Conservative
5th Queens	Gordon L. Bennett	Liberal	Elmer Blanchard	Liberal
6th Queens	Allison MacDonald	Liberal	John H. Maloney	Liberal
