= 1978 Prince Edward Island general election =

Canadian provincial election

← 1974	April 24, 1978	1979 →

All 32 seats in the Legislative Assembly of Prince Edward Island 17 seats needed for a majority
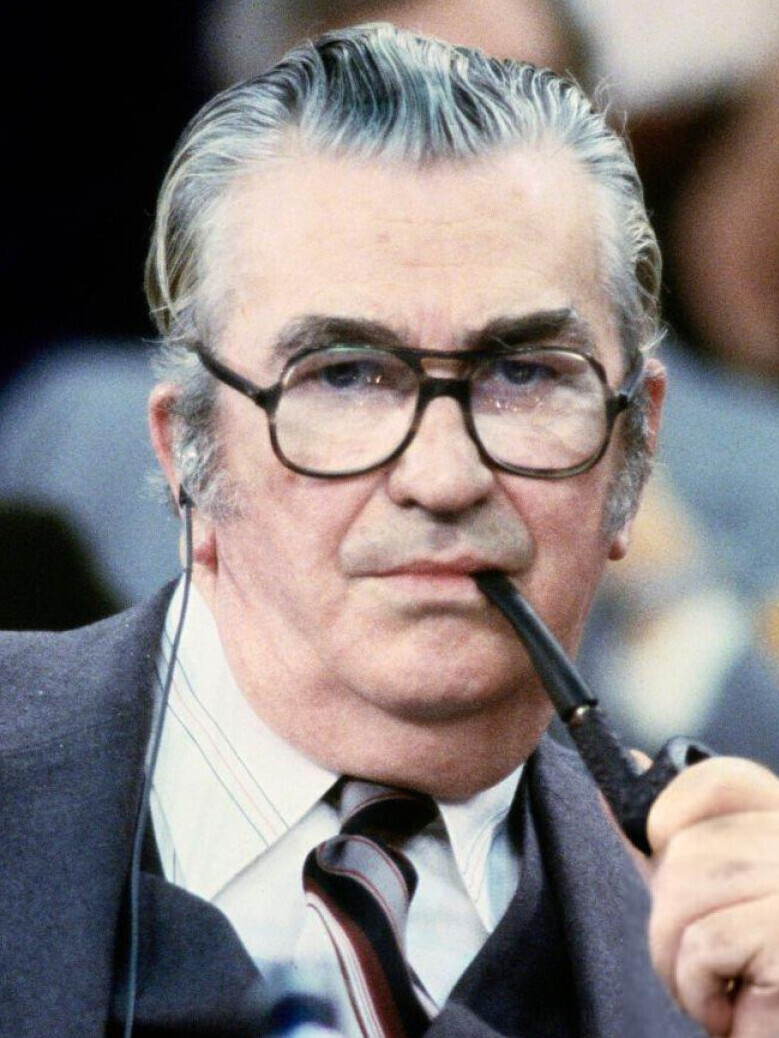
	First party	Second party
	Lib
Leader	Alexander B. Campbell	Angus MacLean
Party	Liberal	Progressive Conservative
Leader since	December 11, 1965	September 25, 1976
Leader's seat	5th Prince	4th Queens
Last election	26 seats, 54.0%	6 seats, 39.9%
Seats won	17	15
Seat change	▼9	▲9
Popular vote	64,133	60,878
Percentage	50.7%	48.1%
Swing	▼3.3pp	▲8.2pp
- Seats won by each party per district. Voters elect two members (one Councillor and Assemblyman) from each of the 16 districts.
Premier before election
Alexander B. Campbell
Liberal
Premier after election
Alexander B. Campbell
Liberal

The 1978 Prince Edward Island general election was held on April 24, 1978.

The election was one of the closest in P.E.I. history, with the governing Liberals of Premier Alexander B. Campbell losing a number of seats to their Progressive Conservative rivals. The decrease of the 26 to 6 Liberal majority to a slim 17 to 15 lead over the PC, and the resignation of Alex Campbell, led to an unstable legislature, and another election was held just one year later in 1979.

== Party standings ==
↓
17	15
Liberal	PC

Party	Party Leader	Seats			Popular Vote		
Party	Party Leader	1974	Elected	Change	#	%	Change
Liberal	Alex Campbell	26	17	-9	64,133	50.7%	-3.3%
Progressive Conservative	Angus MacLean	6	15	+9	60,878	48.1%	+8.2%
New Democratic	Aquinas Ryan	0	0	-	1,173	0.9%	-5.3%
Independent		-	0	-	257	0.2%	+0.2%

Popular vote
Liberal	50.72%
PC	48.15%
New Democratic	0.93%
Others	0.20%

Seats summary
Liberal	53.13%
PC	46.87%

== Members elected ==
The Legislature of Prince Edward Island had two levels of membership from 1893 to 1996 - Assemblymen and Councillors. This was a holdover from when the Island had a bicameral legislature, the General Assembly and the Legislative Council.

In 1893, the Legislative Council was abolished and had its membership merged with the Assembly, though the two titles remained separate and were elected by different electoral franchises. Assembleymen were elected by all eligible voters of within a district. Before 1963, Councillors were only elected by landowners within a district, but afterward they were elected in the same manner as Assemblymen.

=== Kings ===
District	Assemblyman	Party	Councillor	Party
1st Kings	Ross "Johnny" Young	Liberal	James Fay	Liberal
2nd Kings	Roddy Pratt	Progressive; Conservative	Leo Rossiter	Progressive; Conservative
3rd Kings	William Bennett Campbell	Liberal	Bud Ings	Liberal
4th Kings	Pat Binns	Progressive; Conservative	Johnnie Williams	Progressive; Conservative
5th Kings	Arthur J. MacDonald	Liberal	Lowell Johnston	Progressive; Conservative

=== Prince ===
District	Assemblyman	Party	Councillor	Party
1st Prince	Russell Perry	Liberal	Robert E. Campbell	Liberal
2nd Prince	George R. Henderson	Liberal	Allison Ellis	Liberal
3rd Prince	Léonce Bernard	Liberal	Edward Clark	Liberal
4th Prince	William MacDougall	Progressive; Conservative	Prowse Chappel	Progressive; Conservative
5th Prince	George McMahon	Progressive; Conservative	Alexander B. Campbell	Liberal

=== Queens ===
District	Assemblyman	Party	Councillor	Party
1st Queens	Jean Canfield	Liberal	Ralph Johnstone	Liberal
2nd Queens	David Ford	Liberal	Lloyd MacPhail	Progressive; Conservative
3rd Queens	Horace B. Carver	Progressive; Conservative	Fred Driscoll	Progressive; Conservative
4th Queens	J. Angus MacLean	Progressive; Conservative	Daniel Compton	Progressive; Conservative
5th Queens	James M. Lee	Progressive; Conservative	George Proud	Liberal
6th Queens	Barry Clark	Progressive; Conservative	John H. Maloney	Liberal
