= George Key (politician) =

Canadian politician

Leader of the Progressive Conservative Party of Prince Edward Island
- In office September 21, 1968 – February 2, 1973
- Preceded by: Walter Shaw
- Succeeded by: Melvin McQuaid

Mayor of Summerside, Prince Edward Island
- In office 1965 – November 28, 1968
- Succeeded by: Ross MacKenzie

Personal details
- Born: 1930/31 Summerside, Prince Edward Island
- Died: July 3, 2005 (aged 73–75)
- Party: Progressive Conservative Party of Prince Edward Island

George Key, Jr. (1930/31 – July 3, 2005) was a Canadian politician, who was the leader of the Progressive Conservative Party of Prince Edward Island from 1968 to 1973.

Born and raised in Summerside, Prince Edward Island, he was the son of George Key, Sr., a prominent local businessman for whom the city's annual "Citizen of the Year" award is named. He served for three years on Summerside's municipal council before becoming the city's mayor in 1965.

He won the leadership at the party's leadership election on September 21, 1968, while sitting as mayor of Summerside. He stepped down as mayor on November 28 after winning the party leadership, just weeks after being reelected to his second term as mayor. As he did not hold a seat in the Legislative Assembly of Prince Edward Island, his predecessor Walter Shaw continued to serve as Leader of the Opposition.

Key led the party into the 1970 election, in which the party won just five seats. Key himself was not elected to the legislature; as the party's assemblyman candidate in the electoral district of 2nd Prince, he lost by a margin of just eight votes to Joshua MacArthur, even as his co-candidate George Dewar won the district's council seat. MacArthur's victory was subsequently confirmed on a judicial recount. Since Key continued not to hold a seat in the legislature and Shaw had not stood for reelection in 1970, Dewar became the new leader of the opposition.

Key announced his resignation as party leader in 1972, and was succeeded by Melvin McQuaid in early 1973.

He died on July 3, 2005.
