= Sinclair Cutcliffe =

Canadian politician from Prince Edward Island

Assemblyman for 2nd Queens
- In office 1966–1972
- Preceded by: Philip Matheson
- Succeeded by: Bennett Carr

Personal details
- Born: John Sinclair Cutcliffe; August 22, 1930 Summerside, Prince Edward Island, Canada
- Died: November 10, 2007 (aged 77) Charlottetown, Prince Edward Island, Canada
- Party: Liberal
- Occupation: Funeral director

John Sinclair Cutcliffe (August 22, 1930 – November 10, 2007) was a Canadian politician, who served in the Legislative Assembly of Prince Edward Island from 1966 to 1972. A member of the Liberal Party, he represented the district of 2nd Queens.

Born and raised in Summerside, Prince Edward Island, he initially worked at his father's business, the Cutcliffe Funeral Home and eventually became its owner. He also served as the president of the provincial Red Cross, the chief of rescue with the Prince Edward Island Emergency Measures Organization, and the president of the International Rescue and First Aid Association.

He was first elected to the legislature in the 1966 provincial election, serving as a backbench MLA. Reelected in the 1970 provincial election, he served as deputy speaker of the legislature. He resigned his provincial seat in 1972 to run as a Liberal Party of Canada candidate for Malpeque in the 1972 federal election, but was defeated by Angus MacLean.

He died on November 10, 2007, at the Queen Elizabeth Hospital in Charlottetown.
