= William Simpson McNeill =

Canadian politician

William Simpson McNeill (March 17, 1814 – April 2, 1902) was a farmer, fisherman and political figure in Prince Edward Island. He represented 2nd Queens in the Legislative Assembly of Prince Edward Island from 1866 to 1876 as a Liberal member.

He was born in Cavendish, Prince Edward Island, the son of William McNeill, who had served as speaker in the provincial assembly. He was educated in Charlottetown. In 1839, McNeill married Anna Maria Jones. He served as a captain in the local militia.

McNeill, also a commissioner of highways and justice of the peace, was defeated when he ran for reelection in 1876. He died in North Rustico at the age of 88.
