= Dougald Currie =

Canadian politician

Dougald Currie (August 22, ca. 1844 – November 5, 1918) was a farmer and political figure on Prince Edward Island, and was educated there. He represented 2nd Queens in the Legislative Assembly of Prince Edward Island from 1902 to 1904 as a Conservative.

He was born in Fairview, Queens County, Prince Edward Island, the son of Malcolm Currie and Katherine Bell, both Scottish immigrants. In 1869, he married Maria Burdette. Currie spent most of his life on a large farm in Fairview, later moving to Charlottetown. He ran unsuccessfully for a seat in the provincial assembly in 1890. Currie was elected to the assembly in a 1902 by-election held after Donald Farquharson was elected to the House of Commons. He ran unsuccessfully for reelection in 1904. He died in Charlottetown.
