= William Richards (politician) =

Canadian politician

William Richards (born May 15, 1819), was a political figure in Prince Edward Island. He was a member of the Legislative Assembly of Prince Edward Island from 1870 to 1872.

He was born in Swansea, Wales, the son of Captain William Richards, and was educated in Wales and Ireland. At the age of eighteen, he went to sea with his father, going on to become owner of his own ship and then a ship builder, building about one hundred ships in his career. Richards settled at Bideford, Prince Edward Island where he built a shipyard. He also owned shipyards at Summerside and Egmont Bay. Rogers purchased a sawmill and cutting rights in New Brunswick. In 1849, he married Susan, the daughter of James Yeo. He supported the bill for the construction of a Prince Edward Island Railway. Richards was elected to the Legislative Council in 1876 for one term. He was president of the Charlottetown Steam Navigation Company.

His son James William served in the provincial assembly and the Canadian House of Commons.
