= John M. Clarke =

Canadian politician

John Montague Clarke (October 1854 – May 25, 1936) was a lumber merchant, contractor and political figure on Prince Edward Island. He represented 5th Kings in the Legislative Assembly of Prince Edward Island from 1904 to 1908 as a Liberal.

He was born in Bedeque, Prince Edward Island, the son of Theophilus Desbrisay Clarke. After completing his education in Bedeque, Clarke worked for John R. Calhoun. He then lived in Colorado for five years before returning to the island and opening his own lumber company in Kensington. In 1877, he married Sarah M. Reeves. Clarke worked as a general building contractor for several years. He also was a member of the town councillor for Summerside Town Council and of the Summerside school board. He served in the province's Executive Council as a minister without portfolio in 1908. He was defeated when he ran for reelection later that year. In 1916, Clarke and his family moved to Edmonton, Alberta. He served as supervisor of Agriculture for Alberta. Clarke died in Edmonton at the age of 81.
