= Gilbert DesRoches =

Canadian politician

Gilbert DesRoches (24 July 1848 – 2 June 1915) was a merchant, farmer and political figure in Prince Edward Island. He represented 5th Prince in the Legislative Assembly of Prince Edward Island from 1899 to 1900.

He was born on 23 or 24 July 1848 in Miscouche, Prince Edward Island, the son of Jean DesRoches and Nanette Poirier, Acadians. In 1873, he married Sophie Poirier. He learned the trade of making shoes but then went into business with his brother-in-law, Joseph Poirier, in 1876. In 1880, he established his own business in Miscouche, building a store and grain storehouse. DesRoches also exported lobsters and Malpeque oysters. He served as local postmaster and, for a time, operated a construction business. In 1880, he attended the Convention Nationale des Canadiens Français at Quebec City and he helped organized the Second Acadian National Convention which was held in Miscouche in 1884. Desroches ran unsuccessfully for a seat in the provincial assembly in 1890, 1893, and 1897. He was finally elected in an 1899 by-election held after Alfred Lefurgey resigned his seat to run for a seat in the House of Commons, but was then defeated in the 1900 general election. DesRoches died in Miscouche in 1915 after a long illness.
