= John H. Maloney =

Canadian politician and physician

John H. Maloney OPEI

MLA (Councillor) for 6th Queens
- In office 1970–1979
- Preceded by: Alban Farmer
- Succeeded by: Jim Larkin

Personal details
- Born: February 6, 1918 Barachois, Quebec
- Died: May 10, 2001 (aged 83) Charlottetown, Prince Edward Island
- Party: Liberal

John H. Maloney, OPEI (February 6, 1918 – May 10, 2001), was a Canadian politician and physician. He represented 6th Queens in the Legislative Assembly of Prince Edward Island from 1970 to 1979 as a Liberal.

Maloney was born in 1918 in Barachois, Quebec. He married Marguerite Jobe in 1945. Maloney was educated at St. Francis Xavier University, and received a medical degree from McGill University in 1942. From 1943 to 1946, he served overseas in the Royal Canadian Army Medical Corps.

Maloney entered provincial politics in the 1970 election, when he was elected councillor for the electoral district of 6th Queens. On June 25, 1970, Maloney was appointed to the Executive Council of Prince Edward Island as Minister of Health and Welfare. In November 1971, he was given an additional role in cabinet as Minister of Industry and Commerce. In October 1972, he was shuffled from the health portfolio to Minister of Development. He was re-elected in 1974, and was retained as Minister of Development in a post election cabinet shuffle. Maloney was re-elected in the 1978 election, defeating Progressive Conservative Jim Larkin. Following the election, he continued to serve as Minister of Development, but was also given the job as Minister of Education. Maloney did not re-offer in the 1979 election.

Maloney died in Charlottetown on May 10, 2001. In June 2001, he was posthumously named to the Order of Prince Edward Island.
