= Donald McKay (politician) =

Canadian politician

Donald McKay (January 13, 1836 – January 2, 1895) was a merchant and political figure in Prince Edward Island. He represented 2nd Queens in the Legislative Assembly of Prince Edward Island from 1876 to 1886 and 1890 to 1893 as a Conservative member.

He was born in New London, Prince Edward Island, the son of Donald McKay, a Scottish immigrant. McKay married Jane Matheson. He was a justice of the peace, a commissioner for Small Debt Court, and a member of the board of Railway Commissioners.

He was defeated when he ran for reelection in 1886 and 1893. McKay died in Oyster Bed Bridge at the age of 58.
