= Jean Canfield =

Canadian politician

Member of the Legislative Assembly of Prince Edward Island for 1st Queens
- In office 1970–1979 Serving with Ralph Johnstone
- Preceded by: Frank Myers
- Succeeded by: Marion Reid

Personal details
- Born: Ella Jean Garrett; October 4, 1919 Westmoreland, Prince Edward Island
- Died: December 31, 2000 (aged 81)
- Party: Liberal

Ella Jean Canfield, née Garrett (October 4, 1919 – December 31, 2000) was a Canadian politician. She was the first woman ever elected to the Legislative Assembly of Prince Edward Island, as well as the first woman to serve in the Executive Council of Prince Edward Island.

She was born in Westmoreland, Prince Edward Island, the daughter of Everett Garrett and Lydia Granville McVittie, and married Parker Canfield in 1939.

Canfield originally stood for office in the 1966 provincial election in 1st Queens, but failed against incumbent Frank Myers. She then stood again in the 1970 election, and was successful. She was reelected in the 1974 election and the 1978 election, but was defeated in the 1979 election.

From October 10, 1972, to May 2, 1974, she served as Minister without Portfolio and Minister responsible for the PEI Housing Authority in the government of Alex Campbell.

Following her death in 2000, the Government of Canada announced in 2005 that a new federal office building in Charlottetown would be named the Jean Canfield Building. The building officially opened in 2007.
