= Lloyd MacPhail =

Canadian politician (1920–1995)

The Honourable Lloyd MacPhail CM

23rd Lieutenant Governor of Prince Edward Island
- In office August 1, 1985 – August 16, 1990
- Monarch: Elizabeth II
- Governors General: Jeanne Sauvé; Ray Hnatyshyn
- Premier: James M. Lee; Joe Ghiz
- Preceded by: Joseph Aubin Doiron
- Succeeded by: Marion Reid

Leader of the Progressive Conservative Party of Prince Edward Island Interim
- In office July 1, 1976 – September 25, 1976
- Preceded by: Melvin McQuaid
- Succeeded by: Angus MacLean

MLA (Councillor) for 2nd Queens
- In office July 17, 1961 – August 1, 1985
- Preceded by: Reginald Bell
- Succeeded by: Ron MacKinley

Personal details
- Born: Robert Lloyd George MacPhail; March 22, 1920 New Haven, Prince Edward Island
- Died: July 2, 1995 (aged 75) Charlottetown, Prince Edward Island
- Party: Prince Edward Island Progressive Conservative Party
- Spouse: Helen MacDougall
- Children: Judith Anne, Lynn, Ferne, and Robert
- Education: Prince of Wales College
- Occupation: Businessman, Merchant
- Profession: Politician
- Cabinet: Minister of Industry (1961-1962); Minister of Natural Resources (1962-1965); Minister of Tourism and Development (1965-1966); Minister of Finance (1979-1985); Chairman of the Treasury (1979-1985); Minister of Development (1979-1980); Minister responsible for Tourism (1982-1985)

Robert Lloyd George MacPhail, CM (March 22, 1920 – July 2, 1995) was a Canadian politician and the 23rd Lieutenant Governor of Prince Edward Island.

MacPhail was born on March 22, 1920 in New Haven, Prince Edward Island, the son of Robert Archibald MacPhail and Catherine C. MacLean.

He was first elected in a 1961 by-election to the Legislative Assembly of Prince Edward Island as the Prince Edward Island Progressive Conservative Party candidate in the district of 2nd Queens. He was re-elected in the elections of 1962, 1966, 1970, 1974, 1978, 1979 and 1982. He held many cabinet positions including: Minister of Industry and Natural Resources and of Tourism Development (1965–1966), Minister of Finance (1979–1981), Chairman of the Treasury Board (1979–1981), and Minister of Development (1979–1980). He was Lieutenant Governor from 1985 to 1990.

On March 1, 1995, he was made a Member of the Order of Canada.

MacPhail died on July 2, 1995.

== Arms ==
Coat of arms of Lloyd MacPhail
Notes The arms of Lloyd MacPhail consist of: Crest Above a helmet mantled Azure doubled Or on a wreath Or and Azure rising from a coronet of oak leaves Vert set on a rim Argent a demi lion Argent langued and armed Azure holding in its dexter forepaw a cross crosslet fitchee Gules. Escutcheon Or a lymphad under full sail Azure the sail charged with an oak tree Argent the oars and pennons Gules. Supporters Dexter a race horse Or gorged with a silk collar Azure pendant therefrom a chaplet of potato flowers Gules and sinister a fox gules with underpertions tail tip and ear linings Or gorged with a coronet composed alternately of cross crosslets and thistle flowers Argent. Compartment A grassy meadow divided by a pale Azure fimbriated Argent on either side an oak sapling sprouting bearing a chickadee bird proper. Motto Ex Viribus Familiae Ministerium Civitati
