= Ralph Johnstone (politician) =

Canadian politician (1914–2010)

MLA for 1st Queens
- In office 1970–1979 Serving with Jean Canfield
- Preceded by: Walter Russell Shaw
- Succeeded by: Leone Bagnall

Personal details
- Born: May 5, 1914 Long River, Prince Edward Island
- Died: August 25, 2010 (aged 96) Summerside, Prince Edward Island
- Party: Liberal

Ralph Warren Johnstone (May 5, 1914 – August 25, 2010) was a Canadian politician and farmer. He represented 1st Queens in the Legislative Assembly of Prince Edward Island from 1970 to 1979 as a Liberal.

Johnstone was born in 1914 in Long River, Prince Edward Island. He married Marion Hazel Howard in 1945. A farmer by career, Johnstone operated two farms and was an active member of the Federation of Agriculture.

Johnstone entered provincial politics in the 1970 election, when he was elected councillor for the electoral district of 1st Queens. He was re-elected in the 1974, and 1978 elections. Johnstone was defeated by Progressive Conservative Leone Bagnall, when he ran for re-election in 1979.

Johnstone died in Summerside, Prince Edward Island in August 2010.
