= Joshua MacArthur =

Canadian politician

Joshua Gordon MacArthur

Representative of 2nd Prince
- In office 1970-1976

Personal details
- Born: October 19, 1911 Poplar Grove, Prince Edward Island
- Died: July 23, 1980 (aged 68) Tyne Valley, Prince Edward Island
- Party: Liberal
- Spouse(s): Edna Noye (m. 1933), Vera Jannette Smallman (m. 1969)
- Children: With Edna Noye; George; Joyce; Arnold; Nita; Wilfred; Wyman; Verna; Audrey; Eric; Ivan; With Vera Jannette Smallman; Herman Smallman
- Relatives: George Percy MacArthur (father) Caroline Alice Adams (mother)
- Occupation: Politician, farmer, carpenter

Joshua Gordon MacArthur (October 19, 1911 – July 23, 1980) was a carpenter, farmer and political figure on Prince Edward Island. He represented 2nd Prince in the Legislative Assembly of Prince Edward Island from 1970 to 1976 as a Liberal.

He was born in Poplar Grove, Prince Edward Island, the son of George Percy MacArthur and Caroline Alice Adams. He was married twice: to Edna Noye in 1933 and to Vera Jannette Smallman, the daughter of Forrest Phillips, in 1969.

First elected in the 1970 election, he won by a margin of just eight votes over Progressive Conservative leader George Key. His victory was subsequently confirmed on a judicial recount.

MacArthur resigned due to poor health in 1976. He died at the Stewart Memorial Health Centre in Tyne Valley at the age of 68.
