= Donald Farquharson (politician) =

Canadian politician

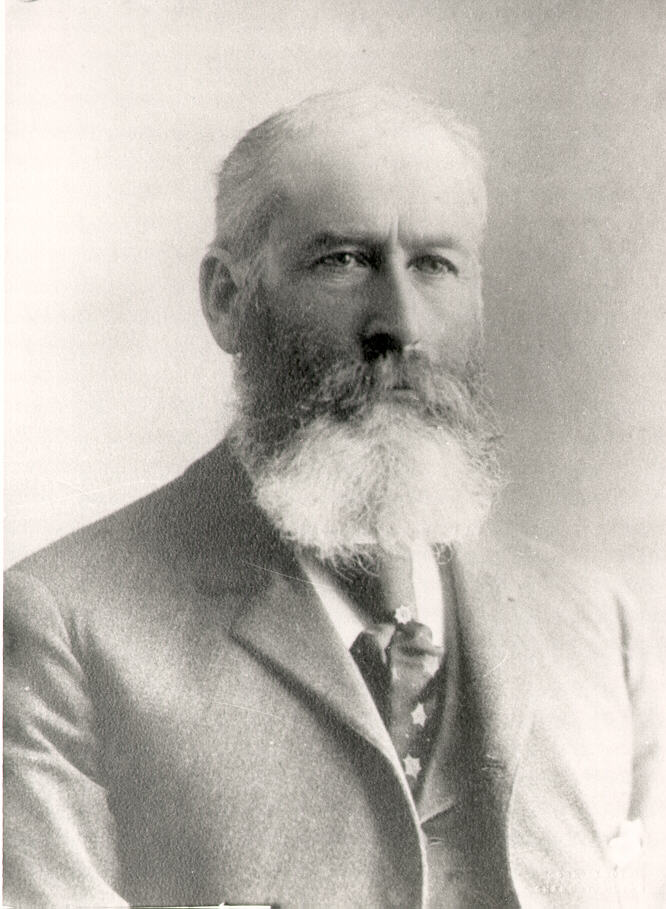

8th Premier of Prince Edward Island
- In office August 1, 1898 – December 29, 1901
- Monarchs: Victoria; Edward VII
- Lieutenant Governor: George William Howlan; Peter Adolphus McIntyre
- Preceded by: Alexander B. Warburton
- Succeeded by: Arthur Peters

Leader of the Prince Edward Island Liberal Party
- In office August 1, 1898 – December 29, 1901
- Preceded by: Alexander B. Warburton
- Succeeded by: Arthur Peters

Member of the General Assembly of Prince Edward Island for 2nd Queens
- In office August 10, 1876 – December 13, 1893 Serving with Donald McKay, Joseph Wise
- Preceded by: Augustus Holland
- Succeeded by: district abolished

MLA (Councillor) for 2nd Queens
- In office December 13, 1893 – January 15, 1902
- Preceded by: himself
- Succeeded by: Samuel E. Reid

Member of Parliament for West Queen's
- In office January 15, 1902 – June 26, 1903
- Preceded by: Louis Henry Davies
- Succeeded by: Horace Haszard

Personal details
- Born: July 27, 1834 Mermaid, Prince Edward Island
- Died: June 26, 1903 (aged 68) Charlottetown, Prince Edward Island
- Party: Liberal
- Spouses: Dopsin May Edwards Smith (m. 1860) Sarah Moore (m. 1870)
- Children: 7
- Education: University of Prince Edward Island
- Occupation: teacher, merchant, and newspaper director
- Profession: Politician
- Cabinet: Minister without Portfolio (1878–1879) (1891–1898)

Donald Farquharson (July 27, 1834 – June 26, 1903) was a Canadian politician who served as the eighth premier of Prince Edward Island.

A native of Mermaid, Farquharson had been a teacher and then a businessman involved in wholesale and shipping. He was elected to the legislature as a Liberal in 1876 and joined the government of Louis Henry Davies in 1878 until the Davies administration fell the next year. Farquharson sat in opposition until the Liberals won the 1891 election. He became Premier in August 1898 but, in 1901, he was persuaded to run in a by-election to the federal House of Commons since PEI Liberals hoped that as a former Premier, he would be elevated to the Canadian cabinet guaranteeing the island's representation in government. Farquharson won the by-election but Sir Wilfrid Laurier appointed a westerner to cabinet instead leaving Farquharson on the backbenches until his death in 1903.

During Farquharson's premiership the provincial legislature passed the Prohibition Act (or Scott Act) which implemented a complete ban on alcohol sales and production in the province starting in 1901. It would not be repealed until 1948.

== See also ==
- Canada Temperance Act
- Provincial premiers who have become Canadian MPs
