= Robert C. McLeod (Prince Edward Island politician) =

Canadian politician

Robert C. McLeod (May 1851 – April 5, 1905) was a merchant, farmer and political figure on Prince Edward Island. He represented 5th Prince in the Legislative Assembly of Prince Edward Island from 1901 to 1904 as a Liberal.

He was born in Dunstaffnage, Lot 35, Prince Edward Island, the son of John Scott McLeod, a Scottish immigrant. McLeod worked as a bookkeeper before entering business on his own as a produce trader. He later sold carriage and farm implements. He served on the town council for Summerside from 1880 to 1883 and was town chairman in 1883. McLeod was also the first president of the Summerside Board of Trade. In 1883, he married Madge L. MacRae. He served in the province's Executive Council.
