= 2nd Queens =

Former provincial electoral district in Prince Edward Island, Canada

Prince Edward Island electoral district
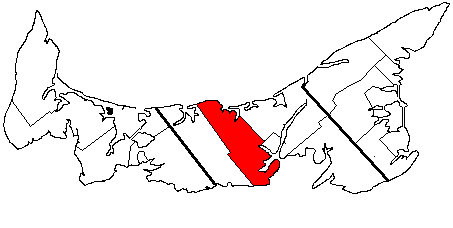

Defunct provincial electoral district
- Legislature: Legislative Assembly of Prince Edward Island
- District created: 1873
- District abolished: 1996
- First contested: 1873
- Last contested: 1993

Demographics
- Census division: Queens County

2nd Queens was a provincial electoral district of Prince Edward Island, Canada, which elected two members to the Legislative Assembly of Prince Edward Island from 1873 to 1993.

The district comprised the western central portion of Queens County. It was abolished in 1996.

== Members ==
=== Dual member ===
Assembly	Years	Member	Party	Member	Party
26th	1873–1876	Henry Callbeck	Liberal	William McNeill	Liberal
27th	1876–1879	Donald McKay	Liberal	Donald Farquharson	Liberal
28th	1879–1882	Donald McKay	Liberal	Donald Farquharson	Liberal
29th	1882–1886	Donald McKay	Liberal	Donald Farquharson	Liberal
30th	1886–1890	Joseph Wise	Liberal	Donald Farquharson	Liberal
31st	1890–1893	Joseph Wise	Liberal	Donald Farquharson	Liberal

=== Assemblyman-Councillor ===
Assembly	Years	Assemblyman	Party	Councillor	Party
32nd	1893–1897	Joseph Wise	Liberal	Donald Farquharson	Liberal
33rd	1897–1900	Joseph Wise	Liberal	Donald Farquharson	Liberal
34th	1900–1902	Albert E. Douglas	Liberal	Donald Farquharson	Liberal
34th	1902–1904	Albert E. Douglas	Liberal	Dougald Currie	Conservative
35th	1904–1908	Albert E. Douglas	Liberal	John McMillan	Liberal
36th	1908–1911	William Laird	Liberal	John McMillan	Liberal
36th	1911–1912	George McPhee	Liberal	John McMillan	Liberal
37th	1912–1915	John Buntain	Conservative	Louis Jenkins	Conservative
38th	1915–1919	George Hughes	Liberal	John McMillan	Liberal
39th	1919–1923	Bradford LePage	Liberal	George Hughes	Liberal
40th	1923–1927	John Buntain	Conservative	Louis Jenkins	Conservative
41st	1927–1931	Angus McPhee	Liberal	Bradford LePage	Liberal
42nd	1931–1935	David Bethune	Conservative	Bradford LePage	Liberal
43rd	1935–1939	Angus McPhee	Liberal	Bradford LePage	Liberal
44th	1939	Angus McPhee	Liberal	Bradford LePage	Liberal
44th	1939–1940	Angus McPhee	Liberal	vacant	
44th	1940–1943	George Kitson	Liberal	Alexander Matheson	Liberal
45th	1943–1947	Philip Matheson	Progressive Conservative	Reginald Bell	Progressive Conservative
46th	1947–1951	Philip Matheson	Progressive Conservative	Reginald Bell	Progressive Conservative
47th	1951–1955	George Kitson	Liberal	Reginald Bell	Progressive Conservative
48th	1955–1959	George Kitson	Liberal	Reginald Bell	Progressive Conservative
49th	1959–1960	Philip Matheson	Progressive Conservative	Reginald Bell	Progressive Conservative
49th	1960–1961	Philip Matheson	Progressive Conservative	vacant	
49th	1961–1962	Philip Matheson	Progressive Conservative	Lloyd MacPhail	Progressive Conservative
50th	1962–1966	Philip Matheson	Progressive Conservative	Lloyd MacPhail	Progressive Conservative
51st	1966–1970	Sinclair Cutcliffe	Liberal	Lloyd MacPhail	Progressive Conservative
52nd	1970–1972	Sinclair Cutcliffe	Liberal	Lloyd MacPhail	Progressive Conservative
52nd	1972–1974	Bennett Carr	Progressive Conservative	Lloyd MacPhail	Progressive Conservative
53rd	1974–1978	David Ford	Liberal	Lloyd MacPhail	Progressive Conservative
54th	1978–1979	David Ford	Liberal	Lloyd MacPhail	Progressive Conservative
55th	1979–1982	Gordon Lank	Progressive Conservative	Lloyd MacPhail	Progressive Conservative
56th	1982–1985	Gordon Lank	Progressive Conservative	Lloyd MacPhail	Progressive Conservative
56th	1985–1986	Gordon Lank	Progressive Conservative	Ron MacKinley	Liberal
57th	1986–1989	Gordon MacInnis	Liberal	Ron MacKinley	Liberal
58th	1989–1993	Gordon MacInnis	Liberal	Ron MacKinley	Liberal
59th	1993–1996	Gordon MacInnis	Liberal	Ron MacKinley	Liberal

== Election results ==
=== 1993 ===
==== Councillor ====
1993 Prince Edward Island general election
Party	Candidate	Votes	%	±%
Liberal	Ron MacKinley	4,043	56.62	-4.48
Progressive Conservative	Brian Dollar	2,729	38.22	-0.67
New Democratic	Gerard Gallant	368	5.15	
Total valid votes		7,140	98.70	
Total rejected ballots		94	1.30	-1.84
Turnout		7,234	83.57	-0.40
Eligible voters		8,656		
Liberal hold		Swing		-1.90
Source: Elections Prince Edward Island

==== Assemblyman ====
1993 Prince Edward Island general election
Party	Candidate	Votes	%	±%
Liberal	Gordon MacInnis	3,916	55.04	-3.71
Progressive Conservative	George Watts	2,783	39.11	-2.14
New Democratic	Marlene Hunt	416	5.85	*
Total valid votes		7,115	98.42	
Total rejected ballots		114	1.58	-1.49
Turnout		7,229	83.51	-0.53
Eligible voters		8,656		
Liberal hold		Swing		-0.78
Source: Elections Prince Edward Island

=== 1989 ===
==== Councillor ====
1989 Prince Edward Island general election
Party	Candidate	Votes	%	±%
Liberal	Ron MacKinley	4,105	61.10	+10.42
Progressive Conservative	Willard MacPhail	2,613	38.90	-4.18
Total valid votes		6,718	96.86	
Total rejected ballots		218	3.14	+2.41
Turnout		6,936	83.97	-4.75
Eligible voters		8,260		
Liberal hold		Swing		+7.30
Source: Elections Prince Edward Island

==== Assemblyman ====
1989 Prince Edward Island general election
Party	Candidate	Votes	%	±%
Liberal	Gordon MacInnis	3,953	58.75	+9.76
Progressive Conservative	Mel Gass	2,776	41.25	-4.56
Total valid votes		6,729	96.93	
Total rejected ballots		213	3.07	+2.32
Turnout		6,942	84.04	-4.57
Eligible voters		8,260		
Liberal hold		Swing		+7.16
Source: Elections Prince Edward Island

=== 1986 ===
==== Councillor ====
1986 Prince Edward Island general election
Party	Candidate	Votes	%	±%
Liberal	Ron MacKinley	3,516	50.68	+5.79
Progressive Conservative	Leonard Cusack	2,988	43.07	+1.56
New Democratic	Janet Norgrove	433	6.24	-7.35
Total valid votes		6,937	99.27	
Total rejected ballots		51	0.73	
Turnout		6,988	88.74	+10.93
Eligible voters		7,875		
Liberal hold		Swing		+2.12
Source: Elections Prince Edward Island

==== Assemblyman ====
1986 Prince Edward Island general election
Party	Candidate	Votes	%	±%
Liberal	Gordon MacInnis	3,393	48.99	+5.39
Progressive Conservative	Gordon Lank	3,173	45.81	-10.59
New Democratic	Judith Thorp Whitaker	360	5.02	
Total valid votes		6,926	99.25	
Total rejected ballots		52	0.75	-1.07
Turnout		6,978	88.61	+7.21
Eligible voters		7,875		
Liberal gain from Progressive Conservative		Swing		+7.99
Source: Elections Prince Edward Island

=== 1985 by-election (Councillor seat) ===
Prince Edward Island provincial by-election, December 2, 1985 Upon the appointment of Lloyd MacPhail as Lieutenant Governor of Prince Edward Island
Party	Candidate	Votes	%	±%
Liberal	Ron MacKinley	2,629	44.89	-1.40
Progressive Conservative	Leonard Cusack	2,431	41.51	-12.20
New Democratic	Janet Norgrove	796	13.59	
Total valid votes/Turnout		5,856	77.81	-4.32
Eligible voters		7,526		
Liberal gain from Progressive Conservative		Swing		+5.40
Source: Elections Prince Edward Island

=== 1982 ===
==== Councillor ====
1982 Prince Edward Island general election
Party	Candidate	Votes	%	±%
Progressive Conservative	Lloyd MacPhail	3,215	53.71	-6.61
Liberal	Ron MacKinley	2,771	46.29	+6.61
Total valid votes		5,986	97.19	
Total rejected ballots		173	2.81	+0.76
Turnout		6,159	82.13	-3.85
Eligible voters		7,499		
Progressive Conservative hold		Swing		-6.61
Source: Elections Prince Edward Island

==== Assemblyman ====
1982 Prince Edward Island general election
Party	Candidate	Votes	%	±%
Progressive Conservative	Gordon Lank	3,380	56.40	+2.18
Liberal	Ernest Smith	2,613	43.60	+1.93
Total valid votes		5,993	98.16	
Total rejected ballots		111	1.82	+0.73
Turnout		6,104	81.40	-4.29
Eligible voters		7,499		
Progressive Conservative hold		Swing		+0.13
Source: Elections Prince Edward Island

=== 1979 ===
==== Councillor ====
1979 Prince Edward Island general election
Party	Candidate	Votes	%	±%
Progressive Conservative	Lloyd MacPhail	3,396	60.32	+8.11
Liberal	Harold R. Godfrey	2,234	39.68	-8.11
Total valid votes		5,630	97.95	
Total rejected ballots		118	2.05	+0.56
Turnout		5,748	85.98	-0.75
Eligible voters		6,685		
Progressive Conservative hold		Swing		+8.11
Source: Elections Prince Edward Island

==== Assemblyman ====
1979 Prince Edward Island general election
Party	Candidate	Votes	%	±%
Progressive Conservative	Gordon Lank	3,008	54.22	+5.97
Liberal	David Ford	2,312	41.67	-7.69
New Democratic	Fred Horne	228	4.11	
Total valid votes		5,548	98.91	
Total rejected ballots		61	1.09	-0.26
Turnout		5,609	85.69	-1.75
Eligible voters		6,546		
Progressive Conservative gain from Liberal		Swing		+6.83
Source: Elections Prince Edward Island

=== 1978 ===
==== Councillor ====
1978 Prince Edward Island general election
Party	Candidate	Votes	%	±%
Progressive Conservative	Lloyd MacPhail	2,794	52.20	+1.87
Liberal	Lawson Drake	2,558	47.80	-1.87
Total valid votes		5,352	98.51	
Total rejected ballots		81	1.49	-1.67
Turnout		5,433	86.73	-0.31
Eligible voters		6,264		
Progressive Conservative hold		Swing		+1.87
Source: Elections Prince Edward Island

==== Assemblyman ====
1978 Prince Edward Island general election
Party	Candidate	Votes	%	±%
Liberal	Dave Ford	2,646	49.37	+0.72
Progressive Conservative	Gordon Lank	2,586	48.25	+2.27
Independent	Anco Hamming	128	2.39	
Total valid votes		5,360	98.66	
Total rejected ballots		73	1.34	-0.50
Turnout		5,433	87.43	+0.39
Eligible voters		6,214		
Liberal hold		Swing		-0.78
Source: Elections Prince Edward Island

=== 1974 ===
==== Councillor ====
1974 Prince Edward Island general election
Party	Candidate	Votes	%	±%
Progressive Conservative	Lloyd MacPhail	2,171	50.34	-0.20
Liberal	Arthur H. Howard	2,142	49.66	+0.20
Total valid votes		4,313	96.83	
Total rejected ballots		141	3.17	+1.02
Turnout		5,117	87.04	-2.18
Eligible voters		5,117		
Progressive Conservative hold		Swing		-0.20
Source: Elections Prince Edward Island

==== Assemblyman ====
1974 Prince Edward Island general election
Party	Candidate	Votes	%	±%
Liberal	H. David Ford	2,127	48.65	+4.72
Progressive Conservative	Bennett Carr	2,010	45.97	-6.17
New Democratic	Roland MacKinnon	235	5.38	+1.44
Total valid votes		4,372	98.16	
Total rejected ballots		82	1.84	
Turnout		4,454	87.04	
Eligible voters		5,117		
Liberal gain from Progressive Conservative		Swing		+5.45
Source: Elections Prince Edward Island

=== 1972 by-election (Assemblyman seat) ===
Prince Edward Island provincial by-election, December 4, 1972 Upon the resignation of Sinclair Cutcliffe to run in the 1972 Canadian federal election
Party	Candidate	Votes	%	±%
Progressive Conservative	Bennett Carr	1,910	52.14	+3.12
Liberal	David Henry Ford	1,609	43.93	-7.05
New Democratic	Margaret Large	144	3.93	
Total valid votes		3,663		
Progressive Conservative gain from Liberal		Swing		+5.09
Source: Elections Prince Edward Island

=== 1970 ===
==== Councillor ====
1970 Prince Edward Island general election
Party	Candidate	Votes	%	±%
Progressive Conservative	Lloyd MacPhail	1,891	50.53	+0.49
Liberal	Horace B. Willis	1,851	49.47	-0.49
Total valid votes		3,742	97.86	
Total rejected ballots		82	2.14	-6.65
Turnout		3,824	89.22	-3.60
Eligible voters		4,286		
Progressive Conservative hold		Swing		+0.49
Source: Elections Prince Edward Island

==== Assemblyman ====
1970 Prince Edward Island general election
Party	Candidate	Votes	%	±%
Liberal	J. Sinclair Cutcliffe	1,904	50.98	-2.54
Progressive Conservative	Bennett Carr	1,831	49.02	+2.54
Total valid votes		3,735	97.67	
Total rejected ballots		89	2.33	-6.38
Turnout		3,824	89.22	-4.59
Eligible voters		4,286		
Liberal hold		Swing		-4.75
Source: Elections Prince Edward Island

== See also ==
- List of Prince Edward Island provincial electoral districts
- Canadian provincial electoral districts
