= Joseph Wise =

Canadian politician

Member of the Legislative Assembly of Prince Edward Island for 2nd Queens
- In office 1886–1890
- In office 1893–1900

Personal details
- Born: October 14, 1834 North Milton, Prince Edward Island
- Died: February 21, 1909 (aged 74) Charlottetown, Prince Edward Island
- Party: Liberal
- Occupation: Farmer, politician

Joseph Wise (October 14, 1834 – February 21, 1909) was a farmer and political figure in Prince Edward Island. He represented 2nd Queens in the Legislative Assembly of Prince Edward Island from 1886 to 1890 and from 1893 to 1900 as a Liberal member.

He was born in North Milton, Prince Edward Island, the son of Joseph Wise, an immigrant from England, and Grace Ryder. Wise married Jane Essery in 1866. After she died, he married Sophia Essery, widow of Albert McKinnon, in 1883. He served as Grand Master in the Orange Lodge and favoured free trade with the United States.

Wise was defeated when he ran for re-election in 1890. During the sessions held in 1899, he voted with the Conservatives. Wise agreed to resign his seat if a by-election would be held for 2nd Queens before spring 1900. The by-election was not held, and consequently Wise withdrew his resignation. He took his seat in the assembly on May 9, 1900. However, his vote, which would have defeated the government, was not recognized by speaker James Cummiskey. When Wise attempted to take his seat the following day, he was physically removed from the legislature by the Serjeant-at-Arms and the House Messenger, and locked in the Speaker's office until the House adjourned. His resignation was entered into the parliamentary record.

Joseph Wise died in Charlottetown at the age of 74.
