= John Agnew (Prince Edward Island politician) =

Canadian politician (1853–1928)

John Agnew (August 22, 1853 – October 26, 1928) was a Scottish-born merchant and political figure. He represented 1st Prince in the Legislative Assembly of Prince Edward Island from 1904 to 1912 as a Liberal member.

He was born in Glasgow, the son of John Agnew and Jean McCulloch. Agnew was educated there and worked as a commission agent for some time before immigrating to New Brunswick. He moved to Alberton, Prince Edward Island, where he worked as a clerk for several years before establishing a lobster, mackerel and meat canning business, mainly exporting his products to Europe. In 1882, he married Agnes I. Ireland. Agnew served as president of the Alberton Board of Trade. He was mayor of Alberton from 1913 to 1917.

Agnew was also involved in fox breeding, owning ranches on the island, in Ontario and in British Columbia. He died in Charlottetown at the age of 84.
