= Albert E. Douglas =

Canadian politician

Albert Edward Douglas (December 9, 1860 – May 6, 1908) was a physician and political figure in Prince Edward Island, Canada.

He represented 2nd Queens in the Legislative Assembly of Prince Edward Island from 1900 to 1908 as a Liberal member.

He was born at Head of Hillsborough as the son of William Henry Douglas, a Scottish immigrant. He was educated at Prince of Wales College, McGill College and New York University. In 1891, Douglas married Barbara Anderson. He was elected in a by-election held in 1900 after Joseph Wise resigned his seat and reelected in the general elections of 1900 and 1904. Douglas was elected speaker for the provincial assembly in 1905.

He lived in Breadalbane, Charlottetown and later in Hunter River. Douglas died in office of pneumonia in Hunter River at the age of 47.
