= George Simpson (Canadian politician) =

Canadian politician

Member of the Legislative Assembly of Prince Edward Island for 1st Queens
- In office 1901–1906
- Preceded by: Peter Sinclair Sr.
- Succeeded by: Murdock Kennedy

Personal details
- Born: George Woodside Simpson; December 10, 1858; Bay View, Prince Edward Island, British North America
- Died: October 21, 1906 (aged 47)
- Political party: Liberal

George Woodside Simpson (December 10, 1858 – October 21, 1906) was a Canadian farmer and political figure on Prince Edward Island. He represented 1st Queens in the Legislative Assembly of Prince Edward Island from 1901 to 1906 as a Liberal.

== Background ==
Simpson was born in Bayview, Prince Edward Island, the son of John Simpson. In 1888, he married Catherine Taylor. Simpson was active in the temperance movement. He was named to the Executive Council of Prince Edward Island in 1903. In 1906, he was selected as a Liberal candidate for the federal riding of Queen's but he died in office at the age of 47 before the federal election was held.
