= Francis Haszard =

Canadian politician

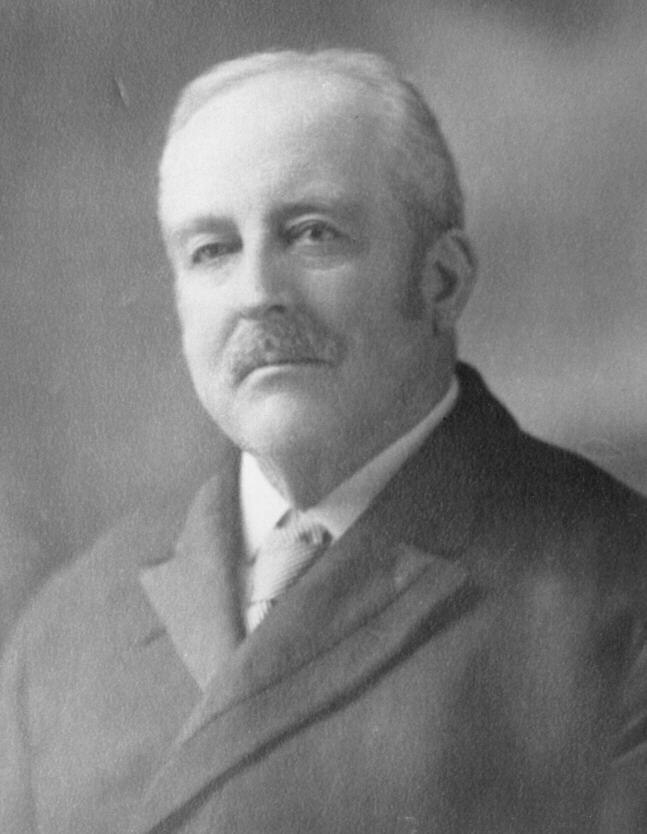

10th Premier of Prince Edward Island
- In office February 1, 1908 – May 16, 1911
- Monarchs: Edward VII; George V
- Lieutenant Governor: Donald Alexander MacKinnon; Benjamin Rogers
- Preceded by: Arthur Peters
- Succeeded by: Herbert James Palmer

Leader of the Prince Edward Island Liberal Party
- In office February 1, 1908 – May 16, 1911
- Preceded by: Arthur Peters
- Succeeded by: Herbert James Palmer

MLA (Councillor) for 4th Queens
- In office December 7, 1904 – May 16, 1911
- Preceded by: George Forbes
- Succeeded by: Alexander Macphail

Personal details
- Born: Francis Longworth Haszard; November 20, 1849 Bellevue, Lot 49, Prince Edward Island, Canada
- Died: July 25, 1938 (aged 88) Charlottetown, Prince Edward Island
- Party: Liberal
- Spouse: Elizabeth DesBrisay (m. 1876)
- Children: 7
- Education: Prince of Wales College
- Occupation: lawyer, city magistrate, city recorder, master of the rolls, judge, and farmer
- Profession: Politician
- Cabinet: Attorney General (1908–1911)

Francis Longworth Haszard (November 20, 1849 – July 25, 1938) was a Prince Edward Island politician and jurist, the tenth premier of Prince Edward Island. His family had been United Empire Loyalists who left the United States after the American Revolution.

Haszard was born at Bellevue, Lot 49, Prince Edward Island. He studied law, was called to the bar in 1872 and set up practice in Charlottetown. He had been a magistrate in Charlottetown before being elected to the provincial legislature for the first time in 1904 as a Liberal. In 1908, he was asked by the lieutenant governor to become premier after the death of Arthur Peters.

The Liberals had been in power since 1891 and their majority in the legislature had eroded over time. By the time Haszard became premier the Liberals and opposition Conservatives had almost equal strength in the house.

Haszard represented PEI at the Maritime and Inter-Provincial conferences held in 1910 and attempted to obtain a better deal for the province from the federal government. He left politics in 1911 to accept an appointment to the province's Supreme Court and as Master of the Rolls. He retired from the bench in 1930.
