= Peter MacNutt =

Canadian politician

Peter MacNutt (5 April 1834 – 24 October 1919) was a merchant and political figure in Prince Edward Island.

He served as a member of the Legislative Council of Prince Edward Island from 1882 to 1886 and from 1890 to 1893. He represented 4th Prince in the Legislative Assembly of Prince Edward Island from 1897 to 1900, and 3rd Prince from 1900 to 1908, as a Liberal member.

He was born in Darnley, Prince Edward Island, the son of Peter S. MacNutt, a former member of the Legislative Council, and was educated there and at the Central Academy (later Prince of Wales College). He served as a commissioner of small debts and as coroner for Prince County for 43 years. MacNutt was county sheriff from 1875 to 1877. In 1861, he married Anna Stewart MacNutt. With Dugalt S. MacNutt, he established a general store at Malpeque, becoming sole owner in 1888 after his partner's death.
