= George Godkin =

Canadian politician

George Albert Godkin (June 4, 1860 – April 1919) was a jeweller, watchmaker and political figure in Prince Edward Island, Canada. He represented 5th Prince in the Legislative Assembly of Prince Edward Island from 1893 to 1897 and from 1900 to 1908 as a Liberal member.

He was born in Charlottetown and later settled in Summerside. In 1890, he married Sadie Brown. In 1907, Godkin was named customs collector for Summerside, serving in that post until his death there in 1919.
