= James McInnis =

Canadian politician

James D. McInnis (May 24, 1855 – August 20, 1917) was a farmer and political figure on Prince Edward Island. He represented 2nd Kings in the Legislative Assembly of Prince Edward Island from 1904 to 1911 and from 1916 to 1917 as a Liberal.

McInnis married Sarah J. McCormack in 1873. He lived at the Head of St. Peters Bay. McInnis was first elected to the provincial assembly in a 1904 by-election held after Anthony McLaughlin was named a judge. He was defeated when he ran for reelection in 1912 but was elected again in 1915. McInnis served in the province's Executive Council. He died in office at the age of 62.
