= John Kickham =

Canadian politician

John Kickham (1847 – January 2, 1917) was a farmer, blacksmith and political figure in Prince Edward Island. He represented 1st Kings in the Legislative Assembly of Prince Edward Island from 1897 to 1908 and 1912 to 1915 as a Conservative member.

He was born in North River, Prince Edward Island, the son of John Kickham, an Irish immigrant, and Mary Cahill. In 1869, he set up shop in West Souris. He married Catherine McLean, sister of James R. McLean, in 1870 and then married Mary MacDonald after his first wife's death.

Kickham was defeated when he ran for reelection in 1908.
