= James Warburton =

Canadian politician

James Warburton (June 30, 1855 – February 9, 1928) was a physician and political figure in Prince Edward Island, Canada. He represented 5th Queens in the Legislative Assembly of Prince Edward Island from 1904 to 1912 as a Liberal member.

He was born in Woodbrook, Lot 10, Prince Edward Island, the son of James Warburton and Martha C. Green, and was educated at St. Dunstan's College, Prince of Wales College and Windsor College. Warburton went on to study medicine at the University of Edinburgh and practiced in Fife for some time. In 1882, he returned to practice in Charlottetown. Warburton was elected mayor of Charlottetown in 1893, in 1900 and in 1902. In 1887, he married Louise Margaretta Hobkirk. He was elected to the provincial assembly in a 1904 by-election held after John Whear resigned his seat.

His brother Alexander was a member of the Canadian House of Commons.
