= Anthony McLaughlin =

Canadian politician

Anthony McLaughlin (March 10, 1844 – November 27, 1925) was a farmer and political figure in Prince Edward Island. He represented 2nd Kings in the Legislative Assembly of Prince Edward Island from 1894 to 1903 as a Liberal member.

He was born at Bedford, Queens County, Prince Edward Island, the son of James McLaughlin and Mary Phillips, both Irish immigrants, and was educated there. He married Clementina Carmichael. McLaughlin served as a minister without portfolio in the Executive Council from 1895 to 1903. McLaughlin served as a magistrate for Kings County and was bursar for the Prince Edward Island Hospital for the Insane.
