= Walter Morson =

Canadian politician

Walter Augustus Ormsby Morson (December 24, 1851 – September 9, 1921) was a lawyer and political figure in Prince Edward Island, Canada. He represented 3rd Kings in the Legislative Assembly of Prince Edward Island from 1902 to 1908 as a Conservative member.

He was born in Malpeque, Prince Edward Island, the son of Richard Willock Morson, who was born in the West Indies, and Elizabeth Cody. Morson studied law with William Wilfred Sullivan in Charlottetown and was called to the bar in 1877, becoming a junior partner in the firm of Sullivan, McLeod and Morson. In 1891, he married May Elizabeth Desbrisay. Morson served in the local militia, reaching the rank of major. He was prothonotary for the Supreme Court of Nova Scotia, then registrar in the court of chancery and master in chancery. He was first elected to the provincial assembly in a 1902 by-election held after the death of Malcolm MacDonald. Morson later became senior partner in law firms named Morson and McQuarrie and Morson and Duffy.
