= John McMillan (Prince Edward Island politician) =

Canadian politician

- Born: May 14, 1851
- Died: 1927

John McMillan (May 14, 1851 – 1927) was a farmer and political figure on Prince Edward Island. He represented 2nd Queens from 1905 to 1911 and from 1916 to 1919 as a Liberal.

He was born in Fairview, Lot 65, Prince Edward Island, the son of Captain Ewan McMillan and Isabella Matheson, and was educated at Prince of Wales College. McMillan operated a large farm in Lot 65. For a short time, he worked as a sailor, travelling to Europe and the West Indies. In 1882, he married Margaret Hamilton Reid. McMillan also served as director of a cheese manufacturing company. From 1908 to 1912, he was a member of the province's Executive Council. McMillan was defeated when he ran for reelection to the provincial assembly in 1912.
