= John Alexander Mathieson =

Canadian politician

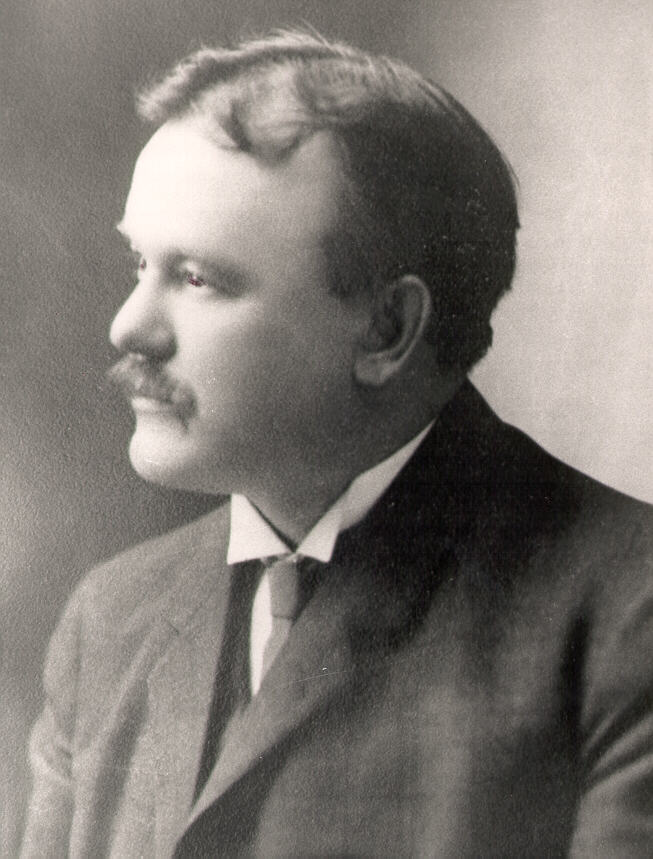

12th Premier of Prince Edward Island
- In office December 2, 1911 – June 21, 1917
- Monarch: George V
- Lieutenant Governor: Benjamin Rogers; Augustine Colin Macdonald
- Preceded by: H. James Palmer
- Succeeded by: Aubin-Edmond Arsenault

Leader of the Conservative Party of Prince Edward Island
- In office 1903 – June 21, 1917
- Preceded by: Daniel Gordon
- Succeeded by: Aubin-Edmund Arsenault

MLA (Assemblyman) for 4th Kings
- In office December 12, 1900 – December 7, 1904
- Preceded by: Albert Prowse
- Succeeded by: Albert Prowse

MLA (Councillor) for 5th Kings
- In office December 7, 1904 – June 21, 1917
- Preceded by: Daniel Gordon
- Succeeded by: James David Stewart

Administrator of Prince Edward Island
- In office July 16, 1919 – September 2, 1919
- Preceded by: Augustine Colin Macdonald
- Succeeded by: Murdock MacKinnon
- In office December 9, 1933 – December 28, 1933
- Preceded by: Charles Dalton
- Succeeded by: George Des Brisay de Blois

Personal details
- Born: May 19, 1863 Harrington, Prince Edward Island Colony
- Died: January 7, 1947 (aged 83) Charlottetown, Prince Edward Island, Canada
- Party: Conservative
- Spouse: Mary Alice I-aird (m. 1896)
- Children: 5
- Education: Prince of Wales College
- Occupation: Teacher, principal, lawyer
- Profession: Politician

John Alexander Mathieson (May 19, 1863 – January 7, 1947) was a politician and jurist of Prince Edward Island, Canada, and the 12th premier.

Mathieson was born in Harrington and graduated from Prince of Wales College. He was a schoolmaster and lawyer before entering politics with his election to the province's legislature as a Conservative in 1900. He represented the district of 4th Kings in his first term in the legislature, then shifted to 5th Kings in 1904.

Mathieson sat on the opposition benches, becoming Leader of the Opposition and of the Conservative Party in 1903. In December 1911, the Liberal government resigned when Premier H. James Palmer was defeated in a by-election which also caused the governing Liberals to lose their majority in the legislature. The Lieutenant-Governor of Prince Edward Island asked Mathieson as leader of the opposition to form a government, which he did, going on to win a mandate in the 1912 general election.

Mathieson's government pressed the federal government to fulfill the terms on which Prince Edward Island joined Canadian Confederation in 1873. He succeeded in persuading Ottawa to provide an improved annual subsidy to the province and, in 1915, Ottawa announced the creation of a year-round ferry service to connect the island to the mainland. The ferries began operating between PEI and New Brunswick in 1917.

The province was also at risk of losing representation in the House of Commons of Canada due to population shifts. PEI had six MPs when it joined confederation in 1873, this was reduced to four and was to be cut further as a result of the 1911 census. Mathieson persuaded the federal government to agree to an amendment to the British North America Act guaranteeing the province a minimum of four MPs in perpetuity.

In 1917, Premier Mathieson left politics to accept an appointment as Chief Justice and served in that position until he retired in 1943.
