= 1st Kings =

Former provincial electoral district in Prince Edward Island, Canada

Prince Edward Island electoral district
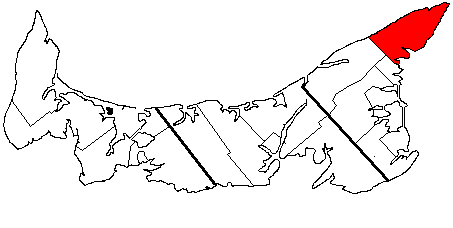

Defunct provincial electoral district
- Legislature: Legislative Assembly of Prince Edward Island
- District created: 1873
- District abolished: 1996
- First contested: 1873
- Last contested: 1993

Demographics
- Census division: Kings County

1st Kings was a provincial electoral district of Prince Edward Island, Canada, which elected two members to the Legislative Assembly of Prince Edward Island from 1873 to 1993.

The district comprised the easternmost portion of Kings County. It was abolished in 1996.

== Members ==
1st Kings elected members to the Legislative Council of Prince Edward Island from 1873 to the dissolution of the Legislative Council in 1893. Subsequently, 1st Kings elected members to the Legislative Assembly of Prince Edward Island until the district was dissolved in 1996. The members it elected were:

=== Dual Member ===
Assembly	Years	Member	Party	Member	Party
26th	1873-1875	James R. McLean	Liberal	Emmanuel McEachern	Conservative
26th	1875–1876	James R. McLean	Liberal	Lauchlin MacDonald	Liberal
27th	1876-1879	James R. McLean	Liberal	Lauchlin MacDonald	Liberal
28th	1879-1882	John Underhay	Liberal	Lauchlin MacDonald	Liberal
29th	1882-1886	James R. McLean	Liberal	John McLean	Conservative
30th	1886-1890	James R. McLean	Liberal	John McLean	Conservative
31st	1890-1891	James R. McLean	Liberal	John McLean	Conservative
31st	1891–1893	James R. McLean	Liberal	Alexander D. Robertson	Liberal

=== Assemblyman-Councillor ===
Assembly	Years	Assemblyman	Party	Councillor	Party
32nd	1893-1897	James R. McLean	Liberal	A. D. Robertson	Liberal
33rd	1897-1900	James R. McLean	Liberal	John Kickham	Conservative
34th	1900-1904	John McLean	Conservative	John Kickham	Conservative
35th	1904-1908	Austin Fraser	Conservative	John Kickham	Conservative
36th	1908-1912	John McLean	Conservative	Lauchlin MacDonald	Liberal
37th	1912-1915	John Kickham	Conservative	John McLean	Conservative
38th	1915-1916	Augustine MacDonald	Conservative	John McLean	Conservative
38th	1916–1919	Augustine MacDonald	Conservative	Harry McLean	Conservative
39th	1919-1923	Daniel C. MacDonald	Liberal	Harry McLean	Conservative
40th	1923-1927	Augustine MacDonald	Conservative	Harry McLean	Conservative
41st	1927-1931	Augustine MacDonald	Conservative	Harry McLean	Conservative
42nd	1931-1935	Augustine MacDonald	Conservative	Harry McLean	Conservative
43rd	1935-1939	Peter MacIsaac	Liberal	Herbert Acorn	Liberal
44th	1939	Herbert Acorn	Liberal	Peter MacIsaac	Liberal
44th	1939-1940	vacant		Peter MacIsaac	Liberal
44th	1940–1943	John Robert McLean	Conservative	Peter MacIsaac	Liberal
45th	1943-1947	Harry Francis	Liberal	Thomas Kickham	Liberal
46th	1947-1949	John Robert McLean	Progressive Conservative	Thomas Kickham	Liberal
46th	1949–1951	John Robert McLean	Progressive Conservative	Brenton St. John	Liberal
47th	1951-1955	William Acorn	Liberal	Brenton St. John	Liberal
48th	1955-1959	William Acorn	Liberal	Brenton St. John	Liberal
49th	1959-1962	John Robert McLean	Progressive Conservative	Melvin McQuaid	Progressive Conservative
50th	1962-1965	John Robert McLean	Progressive Conservative	Daniel J. MacDonald	Liberal
50th	1965–1966	William Acorn	Liberal	Daniel J. MacDonald	Liberal
51st	1966-1970	Bruce Stewart	Liberal	Daniel J. MacDonald	Liberal
52nd	1970-1972	Bruce Stewart	Liberal	Daniel J. MacDonald	Liberal
52nd	1972–1974	Bruce Stewart	Liberal	Melvin McQuaid	Progressive Conservative
53rd	1974-1976	Bruce Stewart	Liberal	Melvin McQuaid	Progressive Conservative
53rd	1976–1978	Bruce Stewart	Liberal	James Bernard Fay	Liberal
54th	1978-1979	Johnny Young	Liberal	James Bernard Fay	Liberal
55th	1979-1982	Johnny Young	Liberal	Albert Fogarty	Progressive Conservative
56th	1982-1986	Johnny Young	Liberal	Albert Fogarty	Progressive Conservative
57th	1986-1989	Johnny Young	Liberal	Albert Fogarty	Progressive Conservative
58th	1989-1990	Johnny Young	Liberal	Albert Fogarty	Progressive Conservative
58th	1990–1991	vacant		Albert Fogarty	Progressive Conservative
58th	1991–1993	Ross Young	Liberal	Albert Fogarty	Progressive Conservative
59th	1993-1996	Roger Soloman	Liberal	Ross Young	Liberal

== See also ==
- List of Prince Edward Island provincial electoral districts
- Canadian provincial electoral districts
