= Matthew Smith (Canadian politician) =

Canadian politician

Matthew Smith (July 15, 1843 – March 1, 1909) was a farmer, hotel owner and political figure in Prince Edward Island, Canada. He represented 1st Queens in the Legislative Assembly of Prince Edward Island from 1901 to 1909 as a Liberal member.

He was born in Crapaud, Prince Edward Island, the son of George Smith, who was born in Yorkshire, England, and Anna Wiggington. In 1870, he married Sarah Elizabeth Lea. Smith was Sunday school superintendent for the Methodist Church and was also trustee and secretary for the local school board. He operated the Pleasant View Hotel at Hampton. He was speaker for the provincial assembly from 1908 until his death in office in Charlottetown in 1909.
