= Joseph Read (Canadian politician) =

Canadian politician

Joseph Read (October 31, 1849 – April 6, 1919) was a Canadian merchant, ship owner and political figure on Prince Edward Island. He represented 4th Prince in the Legislative Assembly of Prince Edward Island from 1900 to 1909 and Prince in the House of Commons of Canada from 1917 to 1919 as a Liberal.

He was born in Summerside, Prince Edward Island, the son of Ephraim Read and Rosara Chappell, and was educated there. After high school, he attended Ion's Nautical School in Liverpool, England. He later became a master mariner, commanding a number of large ships owned by John Lefurgey. In 1877, he married Sarah Carruthers. Read later served as shipping master and port warden at Summerside.

Read served in the province's Executive Council from 1904 to 1905. His election in 1908 was disputed due to questions about the eligibility of some votes. Depending on the source quoted, in 1909, either his election was overturned or he resigned to allow a by-election. Read was defeated by three votes in the by-election held later that year. In the House of Commons, Read spoke against the decrease in the number of federal seats allocated to Prince Edward Island from six at the time that it joined Canada to four when Read was elected to the House. He died in office in Ottawa at the age of 69.

William Lyon Mackenzie King, chosen as Liberal party leader but without a seat, was elected to the House of Commons in the 1919 by-election held for the Prince seat following Read's death.
