= David P. Irving =

Canadian politician

David Purdy Irving (April 6, 1841 – 1922) was a farmer and political figure in Prince Edward Island, Canada. He represented 4th Queens in the Legislative Assembly of Prince Edward Island from 1900 to 1912 as a Liberal member.

He was born in Cherry Valley, Prince Edward Island, the son of James Irving and Anne McKenzie. He was educated at Prince of Wales College and taught school for some time. In 1867, he married Anne Tweedy. Irving operated a large orchard at Cherry Valley.

His son James C. Irving also served in the provincial assembly.
