= Samuel E. Reid =

Canadian politician

Samuel Edward Reid (November 14, 1854 – March 8, 1924) was a farmer, manufacturer and political figure in Prince Edward Island, Canada. He represented 4th Prince in the Legislative Assembly of Prince Edward Island from 1899 to 1908 as a Liberal member.

He was born in St. Eleanor's, Prince County, Prince Edward Island, the son of James Reid, an Irish immigrant, and Charlotte Dawson. Reid was educated at St. Eleanor's and Summerside. He first worked as a bookkeeper for his brothers. Reid then formed the Tryon Woolen Manufacturing Company with one of his brothers. He also managed the Tryon Dairying Company. In 1881, he married Vina Lea. Reid was first elected to the provincial assembly in an 1899 by-election held after John Howatt Bell was elected to the House of Commons. He served as speaker for the assembly from 1901 to 1904. Reid served in the province's Executive Council as provincial secretary, provincial treasurer and Commissioner of Agriculture.

Reid died in Boston at the age of 79.
