= James William Richards =

Canadian politician

James William Richards (May 31, 1850 – March 9, 1915) was a businessman, ship-owner and politician in Canada. From 1873 to 1908 he represented 2nd Prince in the Legislative Assembly of Prince Edward Island, Canada, as a Conservative and then Liberal member. From 1908 to 1915 he represented Prince County in the House of Commons of Canada as a Liberal member.

== Biography ==
James William Richards was born in Britain, at Swansea in South Wales, the son of politician William Richards. He was educated at Prince of Wales College and St. Dunstan's College in Charlottetown.

Richards was first elected to the provincial assembly in an 1873 by-election after James Yeo resigned his seat. He served as a member of the provincial Executive Council from 1891 to 1904. Richards was an unsuccessful candidate for a seat in the House of Commons in 1904 but then was elected in 1908 and reelected in 1911. He died in office in 1915.
