= 3rd Queens =

Former provincial electoral district in Prince Edward Island, Canada

Prince Edward Island electoral district
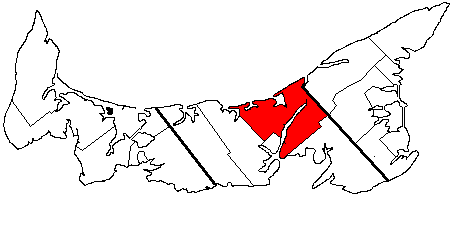

Defunct provincial electoral district
- Legislature: Legislative Assembly of Prince Edward Island
- District created: 1873
- District abolished: 1996
- First contested: 1873
- Last contested: 1993

Demographics
- Census division: Queens County

3rd Queens was a provincial electoral district of Prince Edward Island, Canada, which elected two members to the Legislative Assembly of Prince Edward Island from 1873 to 1993.

The district comprised the northeastern portion of Queens County. It was abolished in 1996.

== Members ==
=== Dual member ===
Assembly	Years	Member	Party	Member	Party
26th	1873–1876	Henry Beer	Liberal	Francis Kelly	Conservative
27th	1876–1879	Henry Beer	Liberal	Francis Kelly	Conservative
28th	1879	Robert Shaw	Conservative	Francis Kelly	Conservative
28th	1879–1882	Robert Shaw	Conservative	Donald A. MacDonald	Conservative
29th	1882–1886	Henry Beer	Liberal	Donald Ferguson	Conservative
30th	1886–1890	Lucius Kelly	Conservative	Donald Ferguson	Conservative
31st	1890–1891	Frederick Peters	Liberal	Donald Ferguson	Conservative
31st	1891–1893	Frederick Peters	Liberal	James Cummiskey	Liberal

=== Assemblyman-Councillor ===
Assembly	Years	Assemblyman	Party	Councillor	Party
32nd	1893–1897	Frederick Peters	Liberal	James Cummiskey	Liberal
33rd	1897–1900	Frederick Peters	Liberal	James Cummiskey	Liberal
34th	1900–1904	James Palmer	Liberal	James Cummiskey	Liberal
35th	1904–1908	Leonard Wood	Conservative	James Cummiskey	Liberal
36th	1908–1911	James Palmer	Liberal	James Cummiskey	Liberal
36th	1911–1912	George Dewar	Conservative	James Cummiskey	Liberal
37th	1912–1915	George Dewar	Conservative	Henry Feehan	Conservative
38th	1915–1919	Leonard Wood	Conservative	David McDonald	Liberal
39th	1919–1923	Peter Brodie	Liberal	David McDonald	Liberal
40th	1923–1927	Leonard Wood	Conservative	Augustine MacDonald	Conservative
41st	1927–1931	Russell Clark	Liberal	David McDonald	Liberal
42nd	1931–1935	Matthew Wood	Conservative	Augustine MacDonald	Conservative
43rd	1935–1939	Russell Clark	Liberal	Mark MacGuigan	Liberal
44th	1939–1943	Russell Clark	Liberal	Mark MacGuigan	Liberal
45th	1943–1944	Russell Clark	Liberal	Mark MacGuigan	Liberal
45th	1944–1947	Russell Clark	Liberal	Eugene Cullen	Liberal
46th	1947–1951	Russell Clark	Liberal	Eugene Cullen	Liberal
47th	1951–1955	Russell Clark	Liberal	Eugene Cullen	Liberal
48th	1955–1959	Russell Clark	Liberal	Eugene Cullen	Liberal
49th	1959–1962	Andrew MacRae	Progressive Conservative	Russell Driscoll	Progressive Conservative
50th	1962–1966	Andrew MacRae	Progressive Conservative	Russell Driscoll	Progressive Conservative
51st	1966–1970	Cecil Miller	Liberal	Russell Driscoll	Progressive Conservative
52nd	1970–1974	Cecil Miller	Liberal	Levi McNally	Liberal
53rd	1974–1978	Cecil Miller	Liberal	Levi McNally	Liberal
54th	1978–1979	Horace Carver	Progressive Conservative	Fred Driscoll	Progressive Conservative
55th	1979–1982	Horace Carver	Progressive Conservative	Fred Driscoll	Progressive Conservative
56th	1982–1986	Horace Carver	Progressive Conservative	Fred Driscoll	Progressive Conservative
57th	1986–1989	Betty Jean Brown	Liberal	Tom Dunphy	Liberal
58th	1989–1993	Betty Jean Brown	Liberal	Tom Dunphy	Liberal
59th	1993–1996	Pat Mella	Progressive Conservative	Tom Dunphy	Liberal

Sources: Elections Prince Edward Island.

== See also ==
- List of Prince Edward Island provincial electoral districts
- Canadian provincial electoral districts
