= Benjamin Gallant =

Canadian politician

Benjamin Gallant (June 11, 1871 – October 27, 1921) was a merchant and political figure in Prince Edward Island. He represented 1st Prince in the Legislative Assembly of Prince Edward Island from 1900 to 1912 and from 1915 to 1922 as a Liberal member.

He was born in Bloomfield, Prince Edward Island, the son of Ebenezer 'Eusèbe' Gallant and Martha Arsenault. Gallant was a merchant, trader and brick manufacturer.

In 1901, he married Annie M. Gallant. Gallant was involved in fish packing, also processing lobster. He was named to the province's Executive Council in 1919. Gallant died in office at Summerside in 1921.
