= 5th Kings =

Former provincial electoral district in Prince Edward Island, Canada

Prince Edward Island electoral district
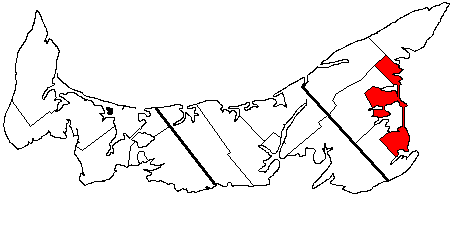

Defunct provincial electoral district
- Legislature: Legislative Assembly of Prince Edward Island
- District created: 1873
- District abolished: 1996
- First contested: 1873
- Last contested: 1993

Demographics
- Census division: Kings County

5th Kings was a provincial electoral district of Prince Edward Island, Canada, which elected two members to the Legislative Assembly of Prince Edward Island from 1873 to 1993.

The district comprised the eastern central portion of Kings County. It was abolished in 1996.

== Members ==
5th Kings elected members to the Legislative Council of Prince Edward Island from 1873 to the dissolution of the Legislative Council in 1893. Subsequently, 5th Kings elected members to the Legislative Assembly of Prince Edward Island until the district was dissolved in 1996. The members it elected were:

=== Dual member ===
| Assembly | Years | Member | Party | Member | Party |
|---|---|---|---|---|---|
| 26th | 1873–1876 | T. Heath Haviland | Independent | Archibald MacDonald | Conservative |
| 27th | 1876–1879 | Daniel Gordon | Conservative | Lewis Westaway | Liberal |
| 28th | 1879–1882 | Daniel Gordon | Conservative | Archibald MacDonald | Independent |
| 29th | 1882–1886 | Daniel Gordon | Conservative | Archibald MacDonald | Conservative |
| 30th | 1886–1890 | Daniel Gordon | Conservative | Archibald MacDonald | Conservative |
| 31st | 1890–1893 | Daniel Gordon | Conservative | Archibald MacDonald | Conservative |

=== Assemblyman-Councillor ===
| Assembly | Years | Assemblyman | Party | Councillor | Party |
|---|---|---|---|---|---|
| 32nd | 1893–1897 | Archibald MacDonald | Conservative | Daniel Gordon | Conservative |
| 33rd | 1897–1900 | Archibald MacDonald | Conservative | Daniel Gordon | Conservative |
| 34th | 1900–1904 | Archibald MacDonald | Conservative | Daniel Gordon | Conservative |
| 35th | 1904–1908 | Archibald MacDonald | Conservative | John Mathieson | Conservative |
| 36th | 1908–1912 | Archibald MacDonald | Conservative | John Mathieson | Conservative |
| 37th | 1912–1915 | Temple McDonald | Conservative | John Mathieson | Conservative |
| 38th | 1915–1917 | Roderick McLellan | Conservative | John Mathieson | Conservative |
| 38th | 1917–1919 | Roderick McLellan | Conservative | James Stewart | Conservative |
| 39th | 1919–1923 | Stephen Hessian | Liberal | James Stewart | Conservative |
| 40th | 1923–1927 | Howard MacDonald | Conservative | James Stewart | Conservative |
| 41st | 1927–1931 | Paul Scully | Liberal | James Stewart | Conservative |
| 42nd | 1931–1933 | Howard MacDonald | Conservative | James Stewart | Conservative |
| 42nd | 1933–1935 | Howard MacDonald | Conservative | vacant | |
| 43rd | 1935–1939 | William Hughes | Liberal | George Saville | Liberal |
| 44th | 1939–1943 | William Hughes | Liberal | George Saville | Liberal |
| 45th | 1943–1947 | William Hughes | Liberal | George Saville | Liberal |
| 46th | 1947–1951 | William Hughes | Liberal | George Saville | Liberal |
| 47th | 1951–1955 | William Hughes | Liberal | George Saville | Liberal |
| 48th | 1955–1959 | Stephen Hessian | Liberal | George Saville | Liberal |
| 49th | 1959–1961 | Stephen Hessian | Liberal | George Saville | Liberal |
| 49th | 1961–1962 | Stephen Hessian | Liberal | George J. Ferguson | Liberal |
| 50th | 1962–1966 | Arthur MacDonald | Liberal | George J. Ferguson | Liberal |
| 51st | 1966–1970 | Cyril Sinnott | Progressive Conservative | George J. Ferguson | Liberal |
| 52nd | 1970–1974 | Arthur MacDonald | Liberal | George J. Ferguson | Liberal |
| 53rd | 1974–1978 | Arthur MacDonald | Liberal | Waldron Lavers | Liberal |
| 54th | 1978–1979 | Arthur MacDonald | Liberal | Lowell Johnston | Progressive Conservative |
| 55th | 1979–1982 | Arthur MacDonald | Liberal | Lowell Johnston | Progressive Conservative |
| 56th | 1982–1986 | Arthur MacDonald | Liberal | Lowell Johnston | Progressive Conservative |
| 57th | 1986–1988 | Arthur MacDonald | Liberal | Barry Hicken | Liberal |
| 57th | 1988–1989 | Rose Marie MacDonald | Liberal | Barry Hicken | Liberal |
| 58th | 1989–1993 | Rose Marie MacDonald | Liberal | Barry Hicken | Liberal |
| 59th | 1993–1996 | Rose Marie MacDonald | Liberal | Barry Hicken | Liberal |

== Election results ==
=== 1993 ===
==== Councillor ====
1993 Prince Edward Island general election
| Party | Candidate | Votes | % |
|---|---|---|---|
| Liberal | Barry Hicken | 1,202 | 70.37 |
| Progressive Conservative | Wesley Stead | 506 | 29.63 |
| Total valid votes | | 1,708 | 97.21 |
| Total rejected ballots | | 49 | 2.79 |
| Turnout | | 1,757 | 88.07 |
| Eligible voters | | 1,995 | |
Source: Elections Prince Edward Island

==== Assemblyman ====
1993 Prince Edward Island general election
| Party | Candidate | Votes | % |
|---|---|---|---|
| Liberal | Rose Marie MacDonald | 1,098 | 64.63 |
| Progressive Conservative | Hal Jamieson | 601 | 35.37 |
| Total valid votes | | 1,699 | 96.70 |
| Total rejected ballots | | 58 | 3.30 |
| Turnout | | 1,757 | 88.07 |
| Eligible voters | | 1,995 | |
Source: Elections Prince Edward Island

== See also ==
- List of Prince Edward Island provincial electoral districts
- Canadian provincial electoral districts
