= 2nd Kings =

Former provincial electoral district in Prince Edward Island, Canada

Prince Edward Island electoral district
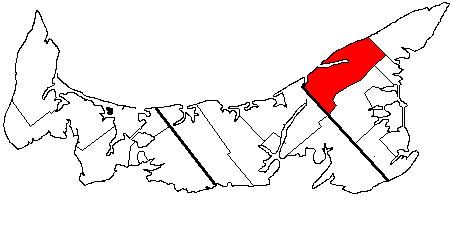

Defunct provincial electoral district
- Legislature: Legislative Assembly of Prince Edward Island
- District created: 1873
- District abolished: 1996
- First contested: 1873
- Last contested: 1993

Demographics
- Census division: Kings County

2nd Kings was a provincial electoral district of Prince Edward Island, Canada, which elected two members to the Legislative Assembly of Prince Edward Island from 1873 to 1993.

The district comprised the northwestern portion of Kings County. It was abolished in 1996.

== Members ==
2nd Kings elected members to the Legislative Council of Prince Edward Island from 1873 to the dissolution of the Legislative Council in 1893. Subsequently, 2nd Kings elected members to the Legislative Assembly of Prince Edward Island until the district was dissolved in 1996. The members it elected were:

=== Dual member ===
| Assembly | Years | Member | Party | Member | Party |
|---|---|---|---|---|---|
| 26th | 1873–1876 | William W. Sullivan | Conservative | Hilary McIsaac | Conservative |
| 27th | 1876–1879 | William W. Sullivan | Conservative | Hilary McIsaac | Conservative |
| 28th | 1879–1882 | William W. Sullivan | Conservative | William Hooper | Independent |
| 29th | 1882–1886 | William W. Sullivan | Conservative | William Hooper | Liberal |
| 30th | 1886–1889 | William W. Sullivan | Conservative | John Underhay | Conservative |
| 30th | 1889–1890 | vacant | | John Underhay | Conservative |
| 31st | 1890–1893 | John P. Sullivan | Conservative | John Underhay | Conservative |

=== Assemblyman-Councillor ===
| Assembly | Years | Assemblyman | Party | Councillor | Party |
|---|---|---|---|---|---|
| 32nd | 1893–1897 | Arthur Peters | Liberal | Anthony McLaughlin | Liberal |
| 33rd | 1897–1900 | Arthur Peters | Liberal | Anthony McLaughlin | Liberal |
| 34th | 1900–1904 | Arthur Peters | Liberal | Anthony McLaughlin | Liberal |
| 34th | 1904 | Arthur Peters | Liberal | James McInnis | Liberal |
| 35th | 1904–1908 | Arthur Peters | Liberal | James McInnis | Liberal |
| 36th | 1908–1912 | Robert Cox | Liberal | James McInnis | Liberal |
| 37th | 1912–1915 | Albert Simpson | Conservative | Aeneas Macdonald | Conservative |
| 38th | 1915–1917 | Harvey McEwen | Conservative | James McInnis | Liberal |
| 38th | 1917–1919 | Harvey McEwen | Conservative | R. J. Macdonald | Conservative |
| 39th | 1919–1923 | Robert Cox | Liberal | James McIntyre | Conservative |
| 40th | 1923–1927 | Harvey McEwen | Conservative | James McDonald | Conservative |
| 41st | 1927–1931 | Harry Cox | Liberal | James McIntyre | Conservative |
| 42nd | 1931–1935 | Harry Cox | Liberal | James McIntyre | Conservative |
| 43rd | 1935–1939 | Harry Cox | Liberal | James McIntyre | Conservative |
| 44th | 1939–1943 | Harry Cox | Liberal | James McIntyre | Conservative |
| 45th | 1943–1947 | Harry Cox | Liberal | Thomas Cullen | Liberal |
| 46th | 1947–1950 | Harry Cox | Liberal | Lou Burge | Progressive Conservative |
| 46th | 1950–1951 | Harvey Douglas | Liberal | Lou Burge | Progressive Conservative |
| 47th | 1951–1955 | Harvey Douglas | Liberal | Thomas Cullen | Liberal |
| 48th | 1955–1959 | Harvey Douglas | Liberal | Leo Rossiter | Progressive Conservative |
| 49th | 1959–1962 | Walter Dingwell | Progressive Conservative | Leo Rossiter | Progressive Conservative |
| 50th | 1962–1966 | Walter Dingwell | Progressive Conservative | Leo Rossiter | Progressive Conservative |
| 51st | 1966–1970 | Walter Dingwell | Progressive Conservative | Leo Rossiter | Progressive Conservative |
| 52nd | 1970–1974 | Walter Dingwell | Progressive Conservative | Leo Rossiter | Progressive Conservative |
| 53rd | 1974–1978 | Walter Dingwell | Progressive Conservative | Leo Rossiter | Progressive Conservative |
| 54th | 1978–1979 | Roddy Pratt | Progressive Conservative | Leo Rossiter | Progressive Conservative |
| 55th | 1979–1981 | Roddy Pratt | Progressive Conservative | Leo Rossiter | Progressive Conservative |
| 55th | 1981–1982 | Roddy Pratt | Progressive Conservative | vacant | |
| 56th | 1982–1986 | Roddy Pratt | Progressive Conservative | Francis O'Brien | Progressive Conservative |
| 57th | 1986–1989 | Roddy Pratt | Progressive Conservative | Francis O'Brien | Progressive Conservative |
| 58th | 1989–1993 | Claude Matheson | Liberal | Walter Bradley | Liberal |
| 59th | 1993–1996 | Claude Matheson | Liberal | Walter Bradley | Liberal |

== See also ==
- List of Prince Edward Island provincial electoral districts
- Canadian provincial electoral districts
