= George E. Hughes =

Canadian politician

- Born: April 15, 1854; Charlottetown, Prince Edward Island, Canada
- Died: November 4, 1937 (aged 83); Charlottetown, Prince Edward Island, Canada
- Education: Prince of Wales College, St. Dunstan's College
- Occupations: merchant and political figure
- Years active: 1900–1912, 1915–1923
- Known for: member, Legislative Assembly of Prince Edward Island
- Political party: Liberal
- Spouse: Anna Gordon Boyle (m. 1878)
- Parents: Frederick W. Hughes (father); Margaret Binns (mother)

George Edward Hughes (April 15, 1854 – November 4, 1937) was a merchant and political figure in Prince Edward Island, Canada. He represented 5th Queens in the Legislative Assembly of Prince Edward Island from 1900 to 1912 and 2nd Queens from 1915 to 1923 as a Liberal member.

He was born in Charlottetown, the son of Frederick W. Hughes and Margaret Binns. Hughes was educated at Prince of Wales College and St. Dunstan's College. He studied medicine with Dr. Frank D. Beer and then opened a drug store in Charlottetown. Hughes served as a member of the Charlottetown City Council and was also president of the Board of Trade. He also helped establish the Prince Edward Island Development and Tourist Association and served as its president. He was a member of the province's Executive Council.

Hughes was defeated when he ran for reelection in 1912 and in 1923.

He married Anna Gordon Boyle in 1878. Hughes owned a farm in Brookfield where he raised horses for harness racing and cattle. He died in Charlottetown at the age of 83.

One of the locations where Hughes operated as a druggist, known as DesBrisay Block or Apothecaries Hall, is now designated as a National Historic Site of Canada.
