= Arthur Peters (Canadian politician) =

Canadian politician

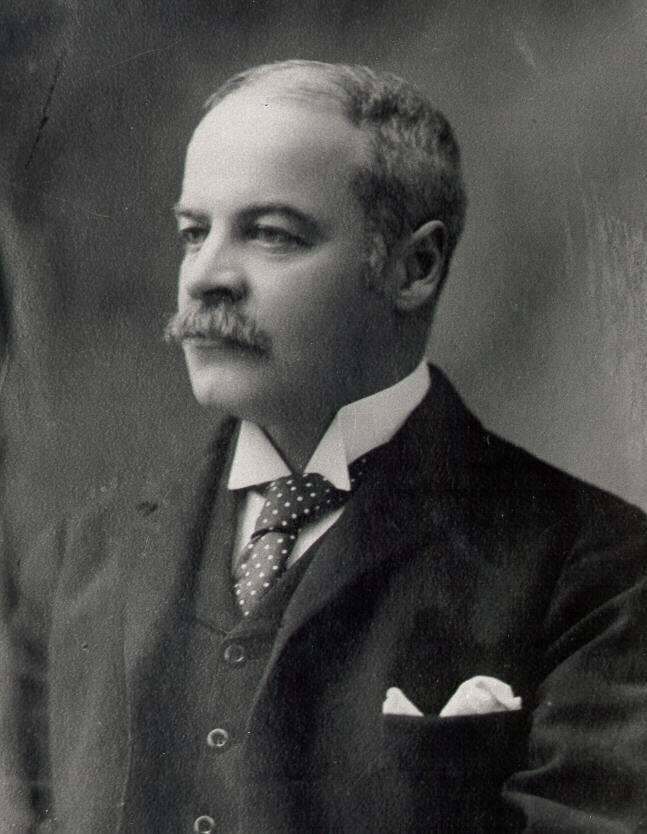

9th Premier of Prince Edward Island
- In office December 29, 1901 – January 29, 1908
- Monarch: Edward VII
- Lieutenant Governor: Peter Adolphus McIntyre; Donald Alexander MacKinnon
- Preceded by: Donald Farquharson
- Succeeded by: Francis Haszard

Leader of the Prince Edward Island Liberal Party
- In office December 29, 1901 – January 29, 1908
- Preceded by: Donald Farquharson
- Succeeded by: Francis Haszard

MLA (Assemblyman) for 2nd Kings
- In office December 13, 1893 – January 29, 1908
- Preceded by: John P. Sullivan; J.C. Underhay
- Succeeded by: Robert Cox

Personal details
- Born: August 29, 1854 Charlottetown, Prince Edward Island
- Died: January 29, 1908 (aged 53) Charlottetown, Prince Edward Island
- Party: Liberal
- Spouse: Mary Cunard (m. 1884)
- Relations: Frederick Peters (brother)
- Children: 4
- Education: Prince of Wales College; King's College
- Occupation: lawyer
- Profession: Politician
- Cabinet: Attorney General (1900–1901)

Arthur Peters (August 29, 1854 – January 29, 1908) was the ninth premier of Prince Edward Island.

Arthur Peters and his brother Frederick Peters (also destined to enter political office) were born in Charlottetown.

Arthur Peters was first elected to the province's legislative assembly in 1893 as a Liberal. He became Attorney-General in 1900 and was asked by the lieutenant governor to become premier of the province on December 29, 1901, after his predecessor had resigned to enter federal politics.

Peters attempted to renegotiate the rules governing the island's representation in the House of Commons of Canada as the island was losing parliamentary seats as a result of successive censuses. Peters argued the province's case before the Judicial Committee of the Privy Council in London (though the matter was not resolved during his lifetime) and he also negotiated an increased federal subsidy to the province. Peters died in office on January 29, 1908, at the age of 53.
