= 2nd Prince =

Former provincial electoral district in Prince Edward Island, Canada

Prince Edward Island electoral district
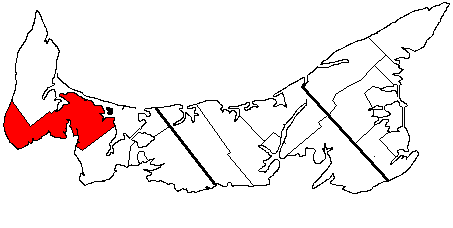

Defunct provincial electoral district
- Legislature: Legislative Assembly of Prince Edward Island
- District created: 1873
- District abolished: 1996
- First contested: 1873
- Last contested: 1993

Demographics
- Census division: Prince County

2nd Prince was a provincial electoral district of Prince Edward Island, Canada, which elected two members to the Legislative Assembly of Prince Edward Island from 1873 to 1993.

The district comprised the western central portion of Prince County, the portion which lay between Malpeque Bay and Egmont Bay. It was abolished in 1996.

== Members ==
=== Dual member ===
Assembly	Years	Member	Party	Member	Party
26th	1873	John Yeo	Conservative	James Yeo	Liberal
26th	1873–1876	John Yeo	Conservative	James Richards	Conservative
27th	1876–1879	John Yeo	Conservative	James Richards	Conservative
28th	1879–1882	John Yeo	Conservative	James Richards	Conservative
29th	1882–1886	John Yeo	Conservative	James Richards	Conservative
30th	1886–1890	John Yeo	Conservative	James Richards	Conservative
31st	1890–1893	John Yeo	Liberal	James Richards	Liberal
31st	1890–1891	vacant		James Richards	Liberal
31st	1891–1893	Alfred McWilliams	Liberal	James Richards	Liberal

=== Assemblyman-Councillor ===
Assembly	Years	Assemblyman	Party	Councillor	Party
32nd	1893–1897	James Richards	Liberal	Alfred McWilliams	Liberal
33rd	1897–1900	James Richards	Liberal	Alfred McWilliams	Liberal
34th	1900–1904	James Richards	Liberal	Alfred McWilliams	Liberal
35th	1904–1908	James Richards	Liberal	Alfred McWilliams	Liberal
36th	1908–1912	John Richards	Liberal	Alfred McWilliams	Liberal
37th	1912–1915	John Richards	Liberal	Alfred McWilliams	Liberal
38th	1915–1919	Albert Charles Saunders	Liberal	William H. Dennis	Liberal
39th	1919–1923	Albert Charles Saunders	Liberal	William H. Dennis	Liberal
40th	1923–1927	Albert Charles Saunders	Liberal	William H. Dennis	Liberal
41st	1927–1930	Albert Charles Saunders	Liberal	William H. Dennis	Liberal
41st	1930–1931	Shelton Sharp	Conservative	William H. Dennis	Liberal
42nd	1931–1935	Shelton Sharp	Conservative	William H. Dennis	Liberal
43rd	1935–1939	George Barbour	Liberal	William H. Dennis	Liberal
44th	1939–1943	George Barbour	Liberal	William H. Dennis	Liberal
45th	1943–1946	George Barbour	Liberal	William H. Dennis	Liberal
45th	1946–1947	George Barbour	Liberal	Forrest Phillips	Liberal
46th	1947–1949	George Barbour	Liberal	Forrest Phillips	Liberal
46th	1949–1951	Walter Darby	Liberal	Forrest Phillips	Liberal
47th	1951–1955	Walter Darby	Liberal	Forrest Phillips	Liberal
48th	1955–1959	George Dewar	Progressive Conservative	Forrest Phillips	Liberal
49th	1959–1962	George Dewar	Progressive Conservative	Robert Grindlay	Progressive Conservative
50th	1962–1966	George Dewar	Progressive Conservative	Robert Grindlay	Progressive Conservative
51st	1966–1970	George Dewar	Progressive Conservative	Robert Grindlay	Progressive Conservative
52nd	1970–1974	George Dewar	Progressive Conservative	Joshua MacArthur	Liberal
53rd	1974–1976	George Henderson	Liberal	Joshua MacArthur	Liberal
53rd	1976–1978	George Henderson	Liberal	George Dewar	Progressive Conservative
54th	1978–1979	George Henderson	Liberal	Allison Ellis	Liberal
55th	1979–1981	George Henderson	Liberal	Allison Ellis	Liberal
55th	1981–1982	Keith Milligan	Liberal	Allison Ellis	Liberal
56th	1982–1986	Keith Milligan	Liberal	Allison Ellis	Liberal
57th	1986–1989	Keith Milligan	Liberal	Allison Ellis	Liberal
58th	1989–1992	Keith Milligan	Liberal	Allison Ellis	Liberal
58th	1992–1993	Keith Milligan	Liberal	Allison Ellis	Independent
59th	1993–1995	Keith Milligan	Liberal	Randy Cooke	Liberal
59th	1995–1996	Keith Milligan	Liberal	vacant	

== See also ==
- List of Prince Edward Island provincial electoral districts
- Canadian provincial electoral districts
