= Alfred McWilliams =

Canadian politician

Alfred McWilliams (October 6, 1840 – 1928) was a farmer and political figure in Prince Edward Island. He represented 2nd Prince in the Legislative Assembly of Prince Edward Island from 1891 to 1915 as a Liberal member.

He was born in West Cape, Prince Edward Island, of Scottish descent. McWilliams was a miller, a justice of the peace and served as postmaster for West Cape for 30 years. He was first elected to the provincial assembly in an 1891 by-election held after John Yeo was elected to the House of Commons.

McWilliams owned a gristmill, a carding mill and a sawmill. He married Clara Jane Winslow in 1905. McWilliams died in West Cape.
