= Archibald John Macdonald (Prince Edward Island politician) =

Canadian politician (1834–1917)

Archibald John Macdonald (October 10, 1834 – August 18, 1917) was a merchant and political figure in Prince Edward Island. He represented 5th Kings in the Legislative Assembly of Prince Edward Island as a Conservative member from 1872 to 1876 and from 1879 to 1912.

He was born in Panmure Island, the son of Hugh Macdonald and Catherine McDonald, and was educated at Georgetown and at the Central Academy (later Prince of Wales College) in Charlottetown. He went into business with his older brother Andrew Archibald and his younger brother Augustine Colin. In 1873, he married Marion Murphy. Macdonald was a justice of the peace, a customs collector at Georgetown and was also a consular agent for the United States. He served as a member of the province's Executive Council from 1873 to 1876 and again in 1883.

Macdonald was defeated when he ran for reelection in 1876. He also served as sheriff for Kings County. He died in Georgetown at the age of 72.
