= Murdoch MacKinnon =

Canadian politician

The Honourable Murdoch MacKinnon
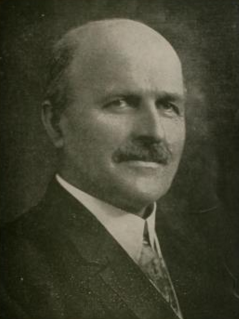

11th Lieutenant Governor of Prince Edward Island
- In office September 2, 1919 – September 8, 1924
- Monarch: George V
- Governors General: The Duke of Devonshire; The Lord Byng of Vimy
- Premier: Aubin E. Arsenault; John Howatt Bell; James D. Stewart
- Preceded by: Augustine Colin Macdonald
- Succeeded by: Frank Richard Heartz

MLA (Councillor) for 4th Kings
- In office July 28, 1897 – July 24, 1919
- Preceded by: George Aitken
- Succeeded by: William G. Sutherland

Personal details
- Born: March 15, 1865 Brooklyn, Kings County, Prince Edward Island Colony
- Died: October 12, 1944 (aged 79) Charlottetown, Prince Edward Island, Canada
- Party: Conservative
- Spouse: Perle Beecher Taylor (m. 1914)
- Children: Francis
- Education: Prince of Wales College
- Occupation: Farmer
- Profession: Politician
- Cabinet: Commissioner of Agriculture (1911-1917); Provincial Secretary Treasurer (1911-1917)

Murdoch MacKinnon (March 15, 1865 – October 12, 1944) was a Canadian politician and served as the 11th Lieutenant Governor of Prince Edward Island.

MacKinnon was born in Brooklyn, Prince Edward Island to parents of Scottish descent, Lauchlin MacKinnon and Mary MacDonald. He received his higher education from Prince of Wales College and then became a farmer. On October 21, 1914, he married Perle Beecher Taylor, and together they had one son.

In the July 28, 1897 General Elections, MacKinnon was elected to represent the Conservative Party in the 4th Kings District in the Provincial Legislature. From that point until the 1919 General Elections, MacKinnon was continuously re-elected and retained his seat in the Legislature. Between 1911 and 1919, he served as Commissioner of Agriculture and Provincial Secretary Treasurer in the provincial cabinet.

On September 8, 1919, Murdoch MacKinnon was appointed Lieutenant Governor of Prince Edward Island and served in that capacity until 1924. He is best known for making constitutional history in the province in 1923 for refusing his assent to the Church Union Bill. He died in Charlottetown.
