= James Cummiskey =

Canadian politician

James H. Cummiskey (January 4, 1850 – February 5, 1925) was a merchant and political figure on Prince Edward Island. He represented 3rd Queens in the Legislative Assembly of Prince Edward Island from 1891 to 1911 as a Liberal.

He was born in Fort Augustus, Prince Edward Island, the first son of Hubert (some texts say Hugh) Cummiskey and Ellen Mitchell. Cummiskey married Catherine Woods(b. 1856 - d. 1925)in St. Joachim Roman Catholic church, Vernon River, PEI in 1878 and they had 12 children. He operated a general store and also farmed. He was an unsuccessful candidate for a seat in the provincial assembly in 1890, but was then elected in an 1891 by-election held after Donald Ferguson ran for a federal seat. Cummiskey served as speaker for the assembly from 1898 to 1900. He was also a member of the province's Executive Council, serving as Minister of Public Works. Cummiskey died in Massachusetts at the age of 75.
