= 1912 Prince Edward Island general election =

Canadian provincial election

- January 3, 1912

All 30 seats in the Legislative Assembly of Prince Edward Island 16 seats needed for a majority
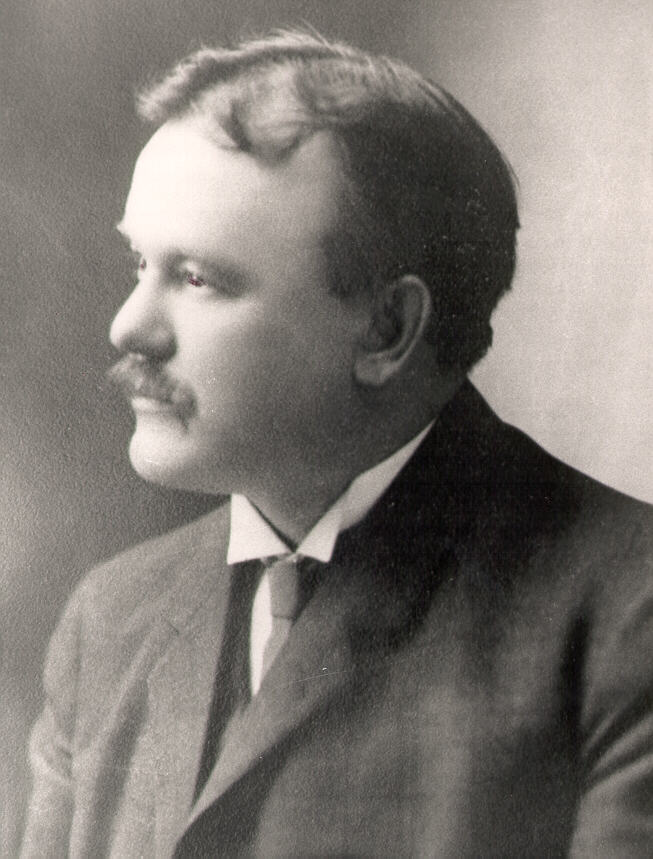

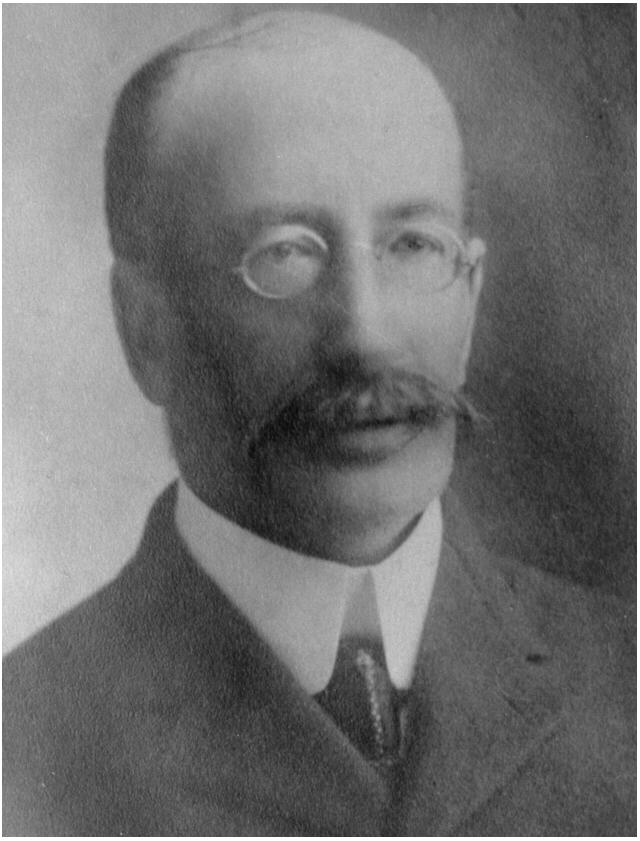
	First party	Second party
Leader	John A. Mathieson	H. James Palmer
Party	Conservative	Liberal
Leader since	1903	1911
Leader's seat	5th Kings	did not run
Last election	13 seats, 48.4%	17 seats, 51.6%
Seats won	28	2
Seat change	▲15	▼15
Popular vote	15,963	10,994
Percentage	59.2%	40.8%
Swing	▲10.8pp	▼10.8pp
Premier before election
John A. Mathieson
Conservative
Premier after election
John A. Mathieson
Conservative

The 1912 Prince Edward Island general election was held in the Canadian province of Prince Edward Island on January 3, 1912.

The election was won by the governing Conservatives, led by incumbent Premier John A. Mathieson, nearly sweeping the island's 30 districts and granting the Conservatives their first clear general election victory since the 1886 election.

Mathieson was designated Premier in December 1911 at the behest of the Lieutenant Governor, following the defeat of his predecessor, Liberal Premier H. James Palmer in a by-election, one that ultimately shifted the balance of power in the Legislature from a bare Liberal majority to a situation in the Conservative's favour.

H. James Palmer, having no seat in the Legislature and ultimately having lost the confidence of the Legislature, resigned from politics and did not run in this election. It is therefore unknown if Palmer led the Liberals in this election, though his biography at the PEI Legislative Documents Online archive makes reference to the "Palmer-led Liberals." There is no other listed leader for the Liberals during the election; Assemblyman John Richards led the Liberals as Leader of the Opposition in the 37th Legislature.

== Party Standings ==
Party	Party Leader	Seats		Popular Vote	
Party	Party Leader	1908	Elected	#	%
Conservative	John A. Mathieson	13	28	15,963	59.2%
Liberal	H. James Palmer	17	2	10,994	40.8%

== Members Elected ==
The Legislature of Prince Edward Island had two levels of membership from 1893 to 1996 - Assemblymen and Councillors. This was a holdover from when the Island had a bicameral legislature, the General Assembly and the Legislative Council.

In 1893, the Legislative Council was abolished and had its membership merged with the Assembly, though the two titles remained separate and were elected by different electoral franchises. Assemblymen were elected by all eligible voters of within a district, while Councillors were only elected by landowners within a district.

=== Kings ===
District	Assemblyman	Party	Councillor	Party
1st Kings	John McLean	Conservative	John Kickham	Conservative
2nd Kings	Albert E. Simpson	Conservative	Aeneas A. Macdonald	Conservative
3rd Kings	John A. Dewar	Conservative	John A. MacDonald	Conservative
4th Kings	Albert P. Prowse	Conservative	Murdock MacKinnon	Conservative
5th Kings	Temple W. Macdonald	Conservative	John Alexander Mathieson	Conservative

=== Prince ===
District	Assemblyman	Party	Councillor	Party
1st Prince	Sylvain Gallant	Conservative	Charles E. Dalton	Conservative
2nd Prince	John Richards	Liberal	Alfred McWilliams	Liberal
3rd Prince	Aubin Edmond Arsenault	Conservative	Hector Dobie	Conservative
4th Prince	James Kennedy	Conservative	Michael C. Delaney	Conservative
5th Prince	James A. MacNeill	Conservative	J. Edward Wyatt	Conservative

=== Queens ===
District	Assemblyman	Party	Councillor	Party
1st Queens	Murdock Kennedy	Conservative	John H. Myers	Conservative
2nd Queens	John Buntain	Conservative	Louis Jenkins	Conservative
3rd Queens	George F. Dewar	Conservative	Henry F. Feehan	Conservative
4th Queens	John S. Martin	Conservative	Alexander Macphail	Conservative
5th Queens	Stephen R. Jenkins	Conservative	William S. Stewart	Conservative
