= 37th General Assembly of Prince Edward Island =

The 37th General Assembly of Prince Edward Island was in session from March 7, 1912, to August 21, 1915. The Conservative Party, led by John Alexander Mathieson formed the government.

J. Edward Wyatt was elected speaker.

There were four sessions of the 37th General Assembly:

Session	Start	End
1st	March 7, 1912	April 26, 1912
2nd	March 12, 1913	April 24, 1913
3rd	March 11, 1914	April 22, 1914
4th	March 17, 1915	April 24, 1915

== Members ==
=== Kings ===
District	Assemblyman	Party	First elected / previously elected
1st Kings	John McLean	Conservative	1882, 1900
2nd Kings	Albert E. Simpson	Conservative	1912
3rd Kings	John A. Dewar	Conservative	1910
4th Kings	Albert P. Prowse	Conservative	1899, 1904
5th Kings	Temple W. Macdonald	Conservative	1912
District	Councillor	Party	First elected / previously elected
1st Kings	John Kickham	Conservative	1897, (Note: Councillor) 1912
2nd Kings	Aeneas A. Macdonald	Conservative	1912
3rd Kings	John A. MacDonald	Conservative	1908
4th Kings	Murdock MacKinnon	Conservative	1897, 1902
5th Kings	John Alexander Mathieson	Conservative	1900

=== Prince ===
District	Assemblyman	Party	First elected / previously elected
1st Prince	Sylvain Gallant	Conservative	1912
2nd Prince	John Richards	Liberal	1908
3rd Prince	Aubin Edmond Arsenault	Conservative	1908
4th Prince	James Kennedy	Conservative	1908
5th Prince	James A. MacNeill	Conservative	1908
District	Councillor	Party	First elected / previously elected
1st Prince	Charles E. Dalton	Conservative	1912
2nd Prince	Alfred McWilliams	Liberal	1891
3rd Prince	Hector Dobie	Conservative	1908
4th Prince	Michael C. Delaney	Conservative	1909
5th Prince	J. Edward Wyatt	Conservative	1908

=== Queens ===
District	Assemblyman	Party	First elected / previously elected
1st Queens	Murdock Kennedy	Conservative	1906
2nd Queens	John Buntain	Conservative	1912
3rd Queens	George F. Dewar	Conservative	1911
4th Queens	John S. Martin	Conservative	1912
5th Queens	Stephen R. Jenkins	Conservative	1912
District	Councillor	Party	First elected / previously elected
1st Queens	John H. Myers	Conservative	1912
2nd Queens	Louis Jenkins	Conservative	1912
3rd Queens	Henry F. Feehan	Conservative	1912
4th Queens	Alexander Macphail	Conservative	1911
5th Queens	William S. Stewart	Conservative	1912
