= Kensington Railway Station =

Railway station in Prince Edward Island, Canada

Coordinates: 46.4378°N 63.6389°W

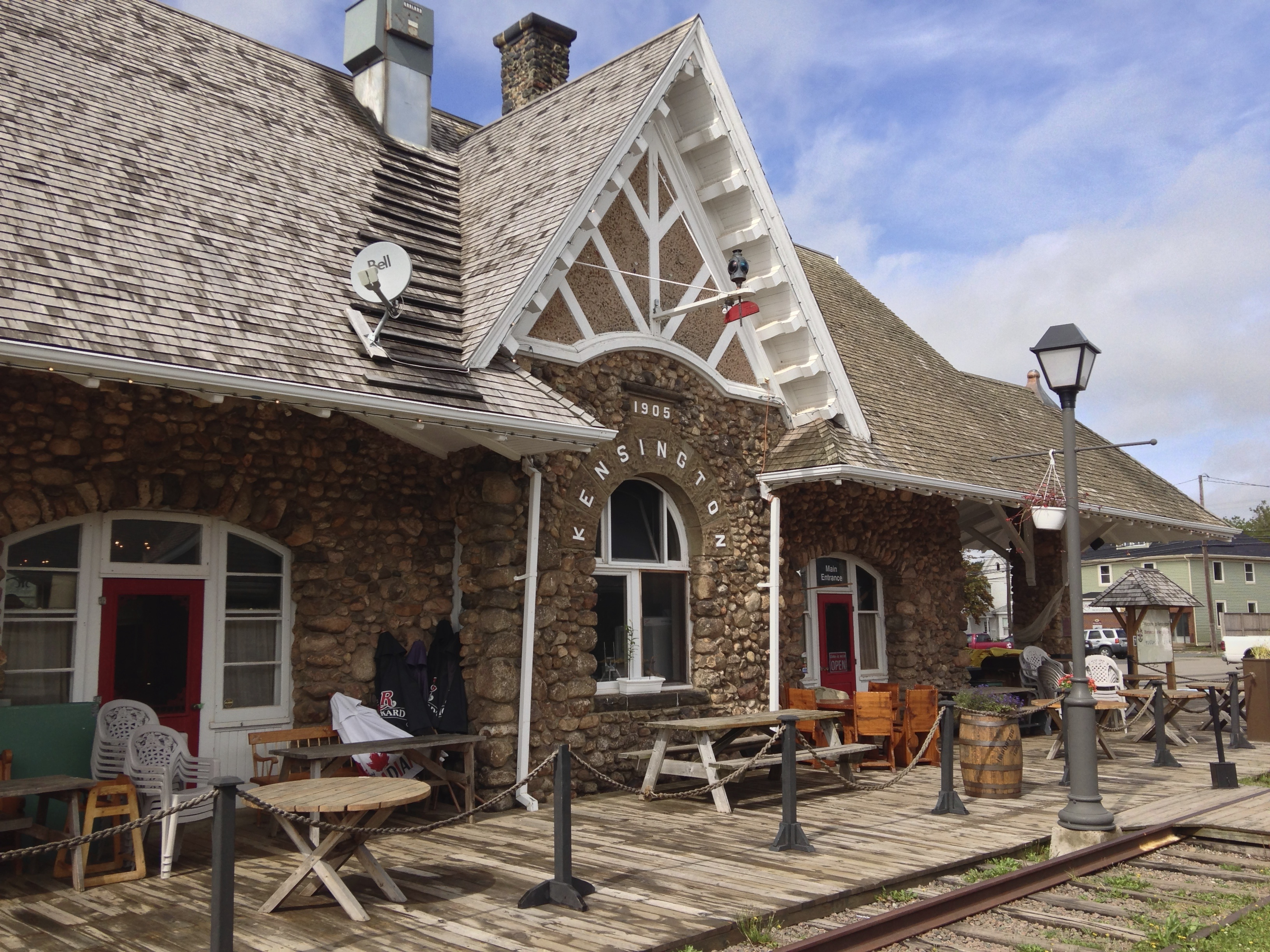
- The station in September 2013 in use as a restaurant
- Interactive map of the Kensington Railway Station area

General information
- Location: Kensington, Prince Edward Island, Canada
- Completed: 1905
- Opened: 20 December 1905

Technical details
- Material: Fieldstone
- Floor count: 1

Design and construction
- Architect: Charles Benjamin Chappell

National Historic Site of Canada
- Official name: Kensington Railway Station National Historic Site of Canada
- Designated: 15 June 1976

The Kensington Railway Station is a National Historic Site of Canada, located in the town of Kensington, Prince Edward Island. The train station was the third built at the site, and one of two "boulder stations" built by Charles Benjamin Chappell in 1904, so named for the fieldstone composing its exterior walls.

Passenger service to the station was terminated in 1969, and in 1985 the site was purchased by the town of Kensington. In 1990, diesel locomotive Engine 1762 was moved to the site from Summerside for permanent display. The building has been restored and renovated, and has been used for various purposes, including as a library and tourist information centre. It is currently used as a restaurant.

== Background ==
In 1871, Prince Edward Island undertook a railway project to connect Georgetown in the east with Alberton in the west. The project greatly increased its debt, which provided impetus for the colony of British North America to evaluate several options, eventually joining Canadian Confederation on 1 July 1873 under the Prince Edward Island Terms of Union.

The earliest station building in Kensington did not have living quarters, making it inadequate for the town. It was a 42-by-22-foot (12.8 by 6.7 m) structure with a ticket office and waiting room, and also had freight storage facilities.

The Prince Edward Island Railway station was replaced in 1878 by a mansard-roofed station building, but could not satisfy the demands placed upon it. In 1904, architect Charles Benjamin Chappell was hired to design a new station building, the same year he designed the railway station in Alberton. The construction company M.F. Schurman and Company was hired to build it. Facilities for processing freight were located north of the station building.

In 1906, the second station building was moved to Imperial Street, where it became the station master residence. That building is still in use. The new station building was opened on 20 December 1905.

== Description ==
The station building has a frontage of 68 by 28 feet (20.7 by 8.5 m) and is constructed from fieldstone obtained from western Prince County and New Brunswick. This stone represented the bulk of the $5,000 cost of the building, was arranged by shape, and was affixed with stucco.

It is a rectangular building with a steeply pitched cross-gable roof, the ends of which are decorated in Tudor style. At the north and south ends of the building, the canopy terminates as a hip roof. The roof overhangs the east and west ends of the building, which provided passengers with shade from the sun and shelter from the rain.

Stone columns support the porticos on each side, and there are sheltered platforms at each gable end. The protruding bay with the arch window was used by the telegraph operator.

Panelling in the office consisted of North Carolina pine and ash, the latter also used to panel the waiting rooms at either end of the station. Hardwood floors were installed throughout the building. The waiting rooms were originally segregated, with a smoking room for men and a non-smoking room for women. These were later transformed for local and express trains.

The site also included a freight shed built in 1906, which was a 22 by 90 feet (6.7 by 27.4 m) building to store freight for shipment, and a number of other warehouses owned by local businesses. A flower garden with concrete lettering spelling the town's name was once installed at the site, but had been removed no later than the 1970s. Near the station are various craft shops.

== National Historic Site ==
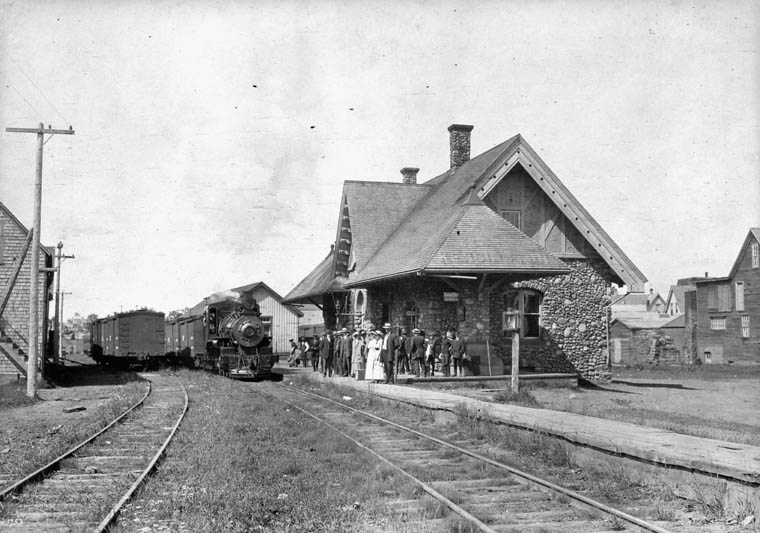
A train arriving at Kensington Railway Station in 1914, with passengers awaiting on the platform.

On 15 June 1976, the Kensington Railway Station was declared a National Historic Site of Canada. The site was purchased by the town of Kensington in 1985 for restoration. A conservation project restored the site in 1999. It was designated a provincial heritage place under the Heritage Places Protection Act in March 2015, along with five other properties: Emerald Railway Station, O’Leary Railway Station, Lyle House (Birch Hill), St. Anne's Church (in Lennox Island), and the West River Petroglyph Site in Bonshaw.

=== Engine 1762 ===
Near the station building is Engine 1762, a diesel locomotive which had been used by Canadian National Railway on the island's railway system. The locomotive had been obtained by Summerside resident Lowell Huestis, who with the assistance of the Summerside Chamber of Commerce moved the 125-ton locomotive from the Canadian National Railway rail yard to a property near his home. After painting it black, he contacted the Kensington Area Chamber of Commerce to propose moving the locomotive to a permanent location in Kensington.

On 16 November 1990, the locomotive was moved, first pushed by a payloader along tracks from Summerside to New Annan, then along portable tracks over an intersection, until it reached a cheering crowd at Kensington Railway Station at about 16:00. Twenty years later, Confederation Trails and the P.E.I. Museum and Heritage Foundation agreed to a joint project to refurbish the locomotive. The project will also install fencing, signage, and interpretive panels, and landscape the surrounding area.

== Legacy ==
The station at Alberton and this station are referred to as "boulder stations" because they were built of fieldstone, and are described as the only two train stations in the province to be architecturally outstanding.

The Prince Edward Island Railway had been subsumed in 1915 as one of the principal components of the Canadian Government Railways (the others were the Intercolonial Railway of Canada, the National Transcontinental Railway, and the Hudson Bay Railway). On 20 December 1918, the Privy Council of Canada issued an Order in Council establishing the Canadian National Railway to manage the nationalized railway system. The Canadian National Railway terminated passenger service on the line in 1969, at which time the station was closed. The railway line was abandoned by Canadian National Railway in 1989, and since then has been redeveloped in stages as a rail trail known as Confederation Trail.

The station building has been used as a box office, library, tourist information centre, and as a storage site for the PEI Railway Heritage Association. In 2006, it was renovated for use as a restaurant. On Saturday mornings, the freight shed hosts a farmers' market.

A replica of the building was created in 1993 for use as the entrance gate at Canadian World, a theme park in Ashibetsu, on the island of Hokkaido, Japan.
