= Stratford, Prince Edward Island =

Stratford
- Town
- Town of Stratford
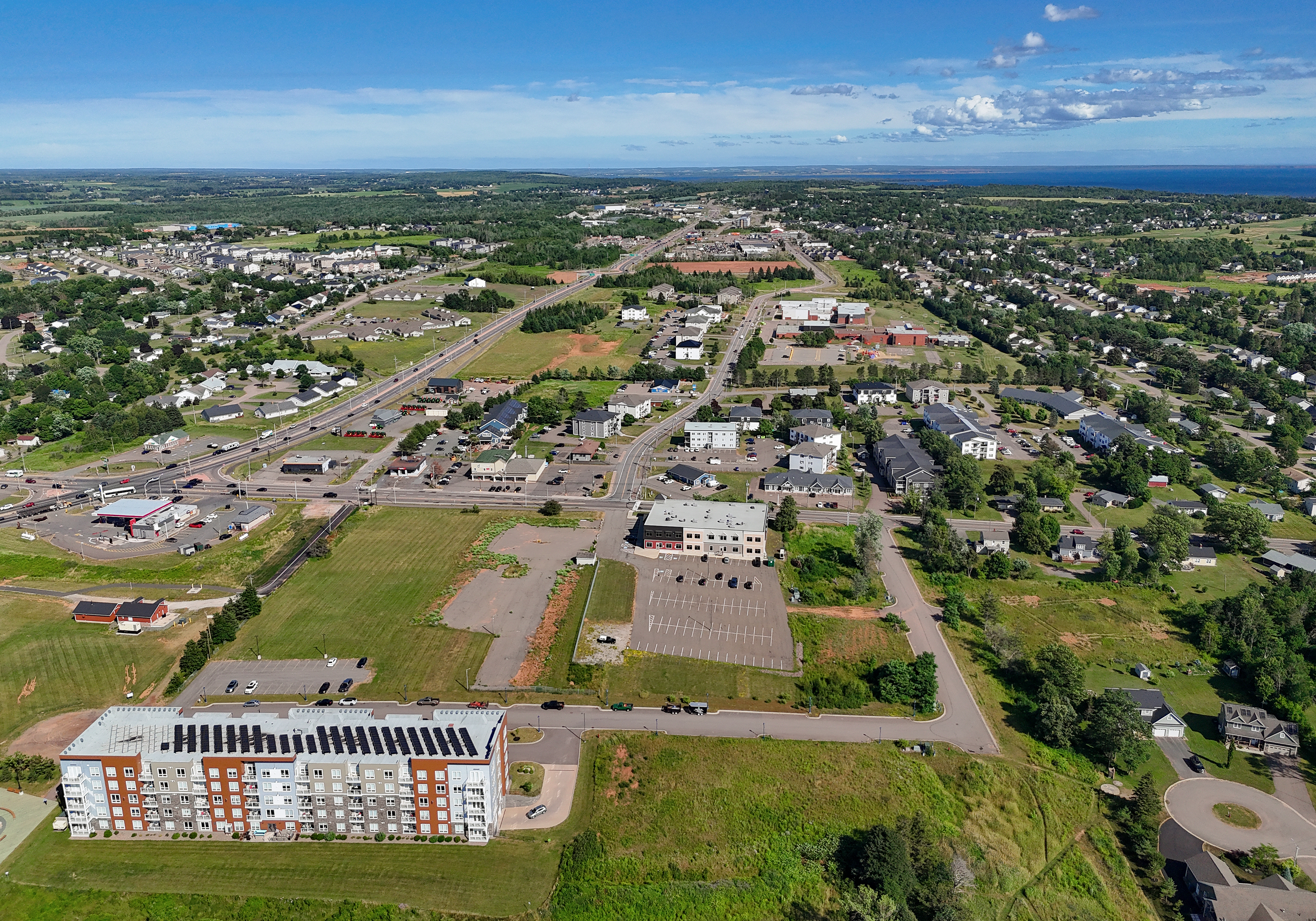

- Flag Seal
- Nickname: A Town of Beauty and Opportunity
- Location of Stratford in Prince Edward Island
- Coordinates: 46°13′00″N 63°05′22″W
- Country: Canada
- Province: Prince Edward Island
- County: Queens County
- Parish: Bedford
- Lot: Lot 48
- Settled: 1750s
- Incorporated: April 1, 1995

Government
  - Mayor: Steve Ogden
  - Councillors: Steve Gallant; Jill Chandler; Gordie Cox; Ron Dowling; Jody Jackson; Jeff MacDonald
  - CAO: Jeremy Crosby

Area
  - Land: 22.67 km^{2} (8.75 sq mi)

Population (2021)
  - Total: 10,927
  - Density: 482/km^{2} (1,250/sq mi)
  - Change (2016-21): ▲12.5%
  - Dwellings: 4,667
- NTS Map: 11L3 Charlottetown
- GNBC Code: BAEWW
- Website: www.townofstratford.ca

Stratford is a town located in Queens County, Prince Edward Island, Canada.

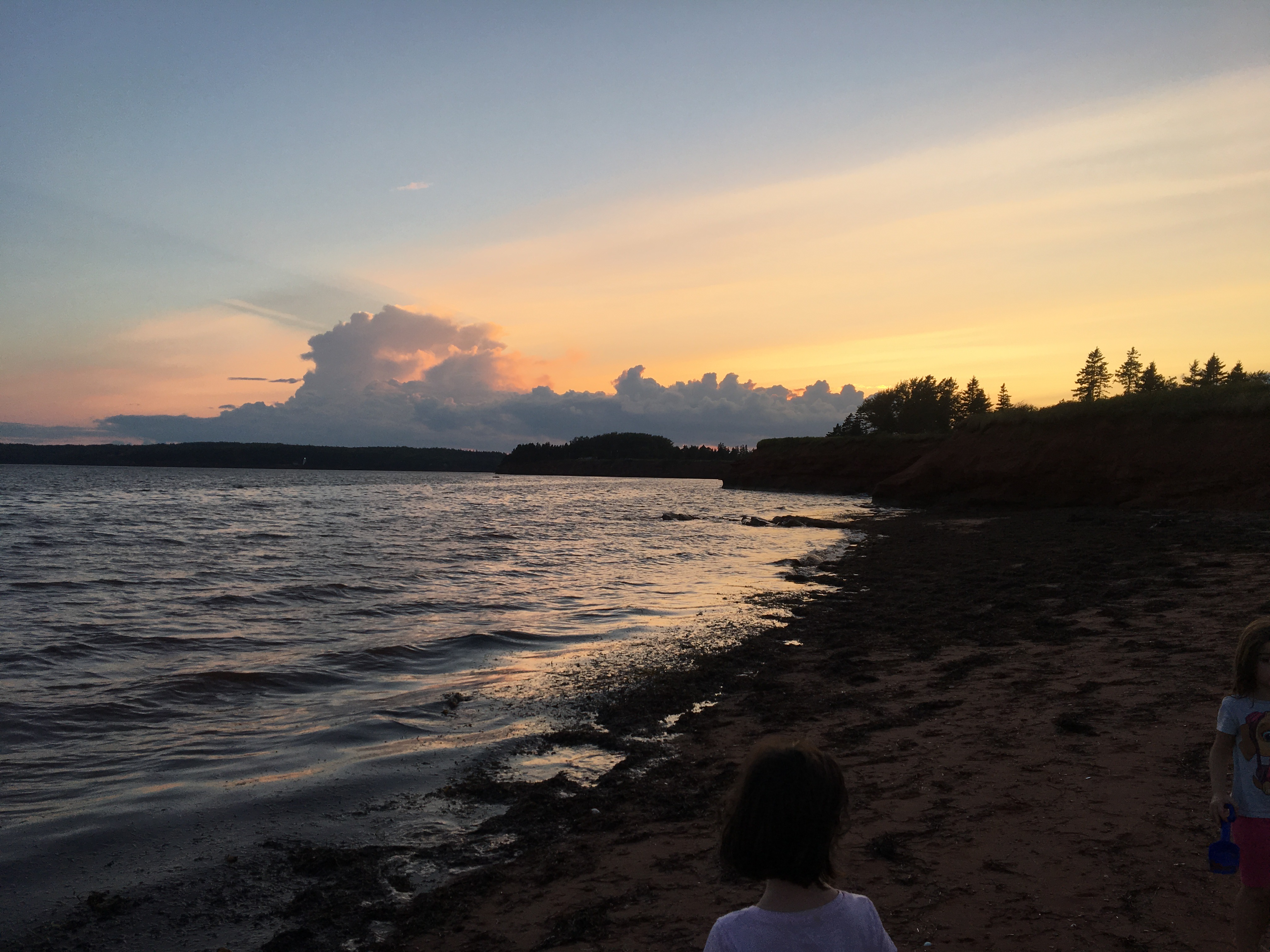
Keppoch Beach, Stratford, Prince Edward Island - facing the Northumberland Strait.

Situated immediately southeast of the city of Charlottetown, Stratford recorded a population of 10,927 in the 2021 census. The town is the third-largest municipality in the province and has experienced population growth in recent decades since improvements were made to the Hillsborough River Bridge connecting the town with Charlottetown.

== Amalgamation ==
Southport was incorporated in 1972, with a main road named "Stratford Road," after the secondary name that had competed with Southport as the village name more than a century earlier.

On April 1, 1995, the incorporated communities of Bunbury, Cross Roads, Keppoch-Kinlock, and Southport amalgamated to form the Town of Stratford. At the same time, the amalgamated Stratford annexed a small portion of the Lot 48 township. The legislation designated the new town as Charlottetown South but that name did not survive long and the town's renaming became controversial as municipal leaders opted to choose a name that had no historic connection to the predecessor constituent communities. It is derived from the Stratford Road, a 4 km (2.5 mi) suburban road connecting Bunbury via Southport with Cross Roads. When the provincial government decided to amalgamate the communities around Southport into a town in 1995, a vote of residents on the new municipality's name resulted in the choice of "Stratford."

Stratford's constituent communities each have had slightly different development patterns. The shoreline of the Hillsborough River in Southport was historically a cottage area for city residents, with cottage development proceeding to Keppoch during the postwar era. Cross Roads, Bunbury, Rosebank and Kinlock were historically agricultural communities.

== Geography ==
The town is situated on a peninsula formed by the Hillsborough River estuary, Charlottetown Harbour, and Hillsborough Bay - a sub-basin of the Northumberland Strait. It is located in the township of Lot 48.

== History ==
Stratford's location across the Hillsborough River from the provincial capital, Charlottetown, has made it an important gateway to the eastern part of the province throughout its history. In early times there had been Mi'kmaq summer camping areas, and during the French regime several families were recorded in the 1752 census at Anse de St-Pierre (in the area later called Keppoch).

Upon the confirmation of British possession of the Island by the Treaty of Paris in 1763, the Island was divided into 67 townships, called "lots." Present-day Stratford is mostly in Lot 48, with the southern portion of the town in Lot 49.

The area's fortunes, historically have been and remain tied to the evolution and development of transportation links with Charlottetown. While the area initially grew a slower pace as a farming community, its first significance was as part of the essential transportation connection between Charlottetown and the Kings County seat, Georgetown, whose port was ice-free and open for shipping more weeks of the year. The Georgetown Road, built by the statute labour of local men aged 16 to 60, and male prisoners sentenced to "hard labour," was a vital link that began at the south side of the Hillsborough River.

By the 1820s, a small ferry service opened to bring passengers, animals, and goods between Ferry Point in Southport to a wharf on the Charlottetown waterfront. The location across from the capital city where it landed became locally known as "the Ferry". During the winter months, horse-drawn sleighs would operate directly across the river, if its waters were frozen.

As settlers arrived in the 19th century, many of them tenant farmers, land was cleared, and the constituent communities of present-day Stratford grew. Most of the early area place-names were originally the names of single farms or homes: Bellevue, Bunbury, Rosebank, Keppoch, Kinlock.

The locally known name for the area changed from "the Ferry" to "Southport," referring to its proximity to Charlottetown, and Southport remained the community name until 1994. However, the name "Stratford" was proposed in the 1850s by Major J. P. Beete, a wealthy and eccentric Englishman who owned property in Lot 48. This competed with "Southport" for about 25 years until Major Beete returned to England.

By mid-century, the village of Southport expanded as roads were improved, and churches and schools grew along with mills, blacksmith shops, and road-houses. Several brick-makers flourished by filling the need for more substantial, fire-resistant buildings.

The Southport Ferry evolved from simple paddle-craft to a small steam-boat that brought people, animals and goods across the province's major river with departures every half-hour from each side. As the appeal of summer homes grew, Keppoch and Rosebank became popular cottage areas.

In 1905, the Prince Edward Island Railway constructed the first Hillsborough River Bridge between Charlottetown and Southport, allowing for train travel to the eastern side of the river. Horse-drawn carriages and sleighs (and later automobiles) were also permitted on the span when trains were not operating, although it was only 1-lane wide with wood planks placed between and on each side of the rails.

The opening of the Hillsborough Bridge between Charlottetown and Southport in 1905 caused a decline in business around the ferry wharf. While dairy and potato farmers, market gardeners, and livestock breeders of cows, horses and silver foxes continued to flourish, during the next 50 years the number of small, mixed farms rapidly declined as the land was bought for housing developments. A two-lane highway bridge replaced the old railway bridge across the river in 1961. The increased ease of automobile traffic contributed to further residential growth on the south side of the river, with permanent year-round dwellings and several subdivisions beginning to replace the seasonal cottages which fronted the Hillsborough River.

By the 1980s, commuter and residential development patterns in PEI were changing and it became apparent that the traffic levels on the new 2-lane Hillsborough River Bridge were surpassing its designed capacity. The 1962-era 2-lane bridge was expanded to a 4-lane bridge with new approach routes in 1995 as a sub-contract to the Northumberland Strait Crossing Project (the Confederation Bridge) with cost-sharing between the federal and provincial governments. The expanded Hillsborough River Bridge was completed in the mid-1990s at around the same time as municipal amalgamation took place.

The current town of Stratford is experiencing growth as a result of the improved highway connection to Charlottetown, where most residents work. The development now includes new subdivisions, a waterfront area, a highway commercial district, and several municipal buildings including a town hall and community centre.

== Demographics ==
Federal census population history of Stratford
Year	Pop.	±%
1991	5,427	—
1996	5,869	+8.1%
2001	6,314	+7.6%
2006	7,083	+12.2%
2011	8,574	+21.1%
2016	9,706	+13.2%
2021	10,927	+12.6%
Source: Statistics Canada

In the 2021 Census of Population conducted by Statistics Canada, Stratford had a population of 10,927 living in 4,307 of its 4,667 total private dwellings, a change of 12.5% from its 2016 population of 9,711. With a land area of 22.67 km^{2} (8.75 sq mi), it had a population density of 482.0/km^{2} (1,248.4/sq mi) in 2021.

Panethnic groups in the Town of Stratford (2001−2021)
Panethnic group	2021		2016		2011		2006		2001	
Panethnic group	Pop.	%	Pop.	%	Pop.	%	Pop.	%	Pop.	%
European (Note: Statistic includes all persons that did not make up part of a visible minority or an indigenous identity.)	9,125	84.1%	8,560	88.89%	7,880	92.76%	6,925	97.88%	6,210	98.49%
East Asian (Note: Statistic includes total responses of "Chinese", "Korean", and "Japanese" under visible minority section on census.)	790	7.28%	545	5.66%	225	2.65%	30	0.42%	10	0.16%
South Asian	320	2.95%	105	1.09%	55	0.65%	20	0.28%	15	0.24%
African	175	1.61%	95	0.99%	30	0.35%	45	0.64%	25	0.4%
Indigenous	160	1.47%	180	1.87%	200	2.35%	15	0.21%	60	0.95%
Middle Eastern (Note: Statistic includes total responses of "West Asian" and "Arab" under visible minority section on census.)	140	1.29%	115	1.19%	10	0.12%	0	0%	0	0%
Southeast Asian (Note: Statistic includes total responses of "Filipino" and "Southeast Asian" under visible minority section on census.)	65	0.6%	35	0.36%	10	0.12%	0	0%	0	0%
Latin American	60	0.55%	0	0%	0	0%	45	0.64%	0	0%
Other/multiracial (Note: Statistic includes total responses of "Visible minority, n.i.e." and "Multiple visible minorities" under visible minority section on census.)	20	0.18%	0	0%	0	0%	0	0%	0	0%
Total responses	10,850	99.3%	9,630	99.17%	8,495	99.08%	7,075	99.89%	6,305	99.86%
Total population	10,927	100%	9,711	100%	8,574	100%	7,083	100%	6,314	100%
Note: Totals greater than 100% due to multiple origin responses

== Notable people ==
- Henry Bayfield (1795-1885), spent a distinguished career as a hydrographer for the Royal Navy, as surveyor of the Great Lakes, St. Lawrence River, and Atlantic coastline. Based in Charlottetown from 1841, where he retired in 1856, Bayfield later enjoyed summers at his substantial cottage in the Keppoch beach community.
- Francis Haszard (1849-1930), was born at Bellevue, Lot 49, a place named after the home of his Loyalist grandfather and early settler, William Haszard. He was described by the Toronto Globe as "an able lawyer, a keen debater, and one with a wide knowledge on most subjects, who believes that anything worth doing is worth doing well." He served as Island Premier in a Liberal administration from 1908 to 1911.
- John Walter Jones (1878-1954), of Bunbury Farm, Bunbury, a well-known breeder of purebred Holstein cattle and silver foxes, was known as the "Farmer Premier" when he headed the government between 1943 and 1953. While a Member of the Legislative Assembly in 1937, at the annual meeting of the PEI Dairymen's Association he gave "an address on 'Let's go to the cow stable,' in which he described feeding problems."
- Sarah Steele (1995–present), played women's ice hockey with Canada's entry at the 2013 IIHF World Women's U18 Championship, winning a gold medal. She would also compete at the NCAA level with the Boston University Terriers women's ice hockey program, graduating in 2017. She would also play professionally in Europe, skating in the European Women's Hockey League with clubs such as Vienna, Austria's EHV Sabres, the Swiss League's Neuchâtel Hockey Academy Dames, plus Hungary's KMH Budapest squad, winning the Supercup, OB1 Hungarian League and EWHL championships during the 2019–20 season.
