= Hillsborough River Bridge =

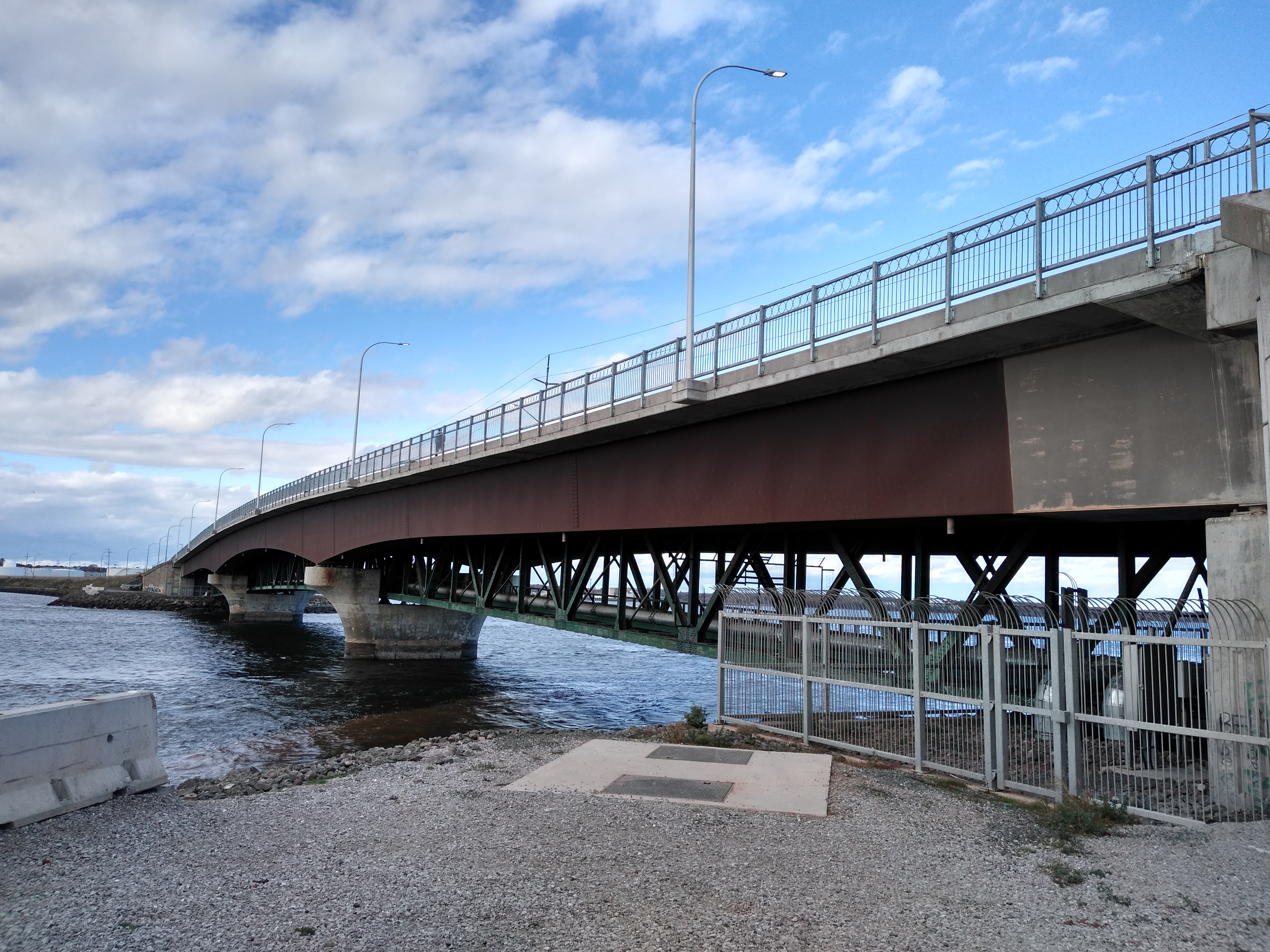
- The bridge from the Stratford side in 2021
- Coordinates: 46°14′9″N 63°6′16″W
- Carries: Motor vehicles
- Crosses: Hillsborough River
- Locale: Queens County, Prince Edward Island, Canada

History
- Opened: 1962

Location
- Interactive map of Hillsborough River Bridge

The Hillsborough River Bridge is a bridge crossing the Hillsborough River estuary between Charlottetown and Stratford in Queens County, Prince Edward Island. The current road bridge, built in 1962, replaced a 1905 rail bridge crossing the same span which was known by the same name.

The first bridge was built by the Prince Edward Island Railway to complete a rail line from Charlottetown to Murray River. The single-lane bridge opened in 1905, and incorporated iron spans from two bridges in Miramichi, New Brunswick built about 30 years earlier. As rail service in the province was converted to standard gauge and heavier service, use of the bridge declined until it was deemed unsafe for all traffic in the 1950s.

As the Trans-Canada Highway project was planned in the 1950s, improving the crossing of the Hillsborough River was deemed essential. A new, improved 2-lane road bridge was built immediately upstream of the old rail bridge, opening in 1962. The bridge was widened to carry 4 lanes of traffic in 1995.

== First bridge, 1905–1962 ==
The Hillsborough River is a 30 km long and up to 1 km wide tidal inlet which empties into Charlottetown Harbour. During the 1800s, a seasonal passenger ferry service operated between the Charlottetown waterfront and Ferry Point on the opposite side. When the river was frozen in winter, horse-drawn sleighs would cross the ice. In 1905, the Prince Edward Island Railway (PEIR) constructed a railway bridge across the river, allowing for train travel to the eastern side.

The Prince Edward Island Railway had constructed a railway line from Southport (now part of Stratford) to Murray Harbour. Like all of the other lines on the Island at the time, the line was built using the 3 ft 6 in (1,067 mm) gauge. The last remaining link in this line involved crossing the Hillsborough River to Charlottetown.

The Intercolonial Railway was a sister company to the PEIR in the neighbouring Maritime provinces and Quebec. Like the PEIR, it was owned by the Government of Canada and it was upgrading its mainline through northeastern New Brunswick to handle heavier locomotives and rail cars. The Intercolonial Railway crossed the Southwest Miramichi River and Northwest Miramichi River between Nelson and Newcastle using two iron bridges set upon stone piers, as designed by engineer-in-chief Sir Sandford Fleming.

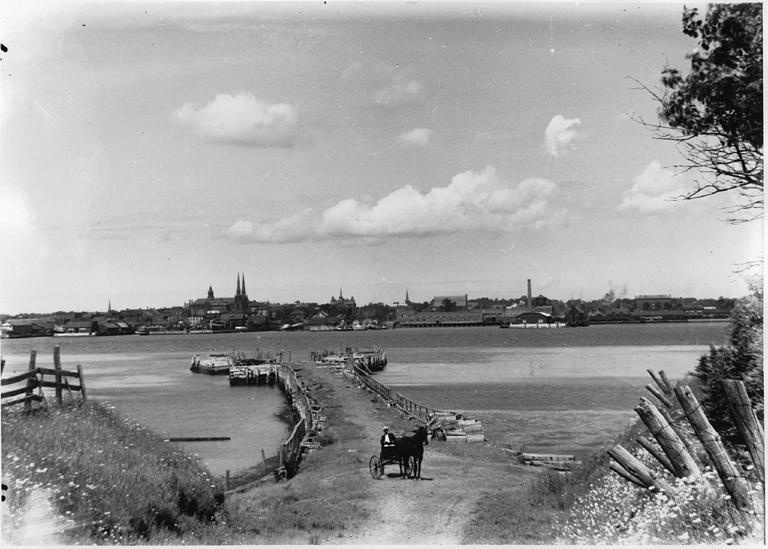
Prior to 1905, the only access across the Hillsborough River was by ferry.

These spans were considered surplus after their heavier replacements were installed, thus the federal government decided to salvage the structure for use on the PEIR's line to Murray Harbour. Both bridges, consisting of 12 spans, were transported on barges to Prince Edward Island.

Before installing the structure, the PEIR hauled thousands of rail car loads of soil excavated alongside the railway line east of the St. Dunstan's University campus several miles northwest of the bridge abutment. These railcars were pushed in 10-15 car trains to the waterfront and used to in-fill large areas for expanded rail yards and wharves, as well as to build an approach causeway from the Charlottetown side. A corresponding approach causeway was built on the Southport side using soil excavated along the railway line in Bunbury east of the bridge.

The remaining gap had 11 stone piers constructed deep into the mud of the Hillsborough River using cofferdams and high pressure air, with stone being imported from Nova Scotia and cemented into place atop the sandstone bedrock beneath the riverbed. The bridge had a motorized swing span in the centre to permit ship traffic to operate upriver on the Hillsborough River, with 2 supporting piers when the span was opened.

=== Impact on travel ===
The bridge opened in 1905 and immediately revolutionized travel in southeastern Prince Edward Island, allowing narrow gauge passenger and freight trains to operate between Charlottetown and Murray Harbour, as well as pedestrians and horse-drawn carriages and sleighs (and later automobiles) to use the bridge when trains were not crossing; for this purpose, wood planks were placed between and on each side of the rails.

The railway bridge saw steady use through to the early 1930s when the PEIR's successor, Canadian National Railways (CNR), completed the conversion of the rail lines in the province from narrow (3 feet 6 inches (107 cm)) to standard (4 feet 8.5 inches (143.5 cm)) gauge. The larger dimensions and weight of standard gauge rail cars and locomotives saw the railway's structural engineers deem the railway bridge unsafe, so a bypass route from Mount Stewart Junction to Lake Verde Junction was built as a depression-era project.

Following the opening of the "Short Line", all heavy rail traffic bound for Murray Harbour was routed through Mount Stewart. The rails on the Hillsborough River Bridge were standard gauged but only lightweight rail cars and locomotives were permitted to use it, thus its use by CNR declined markedly.

=== Decline ===
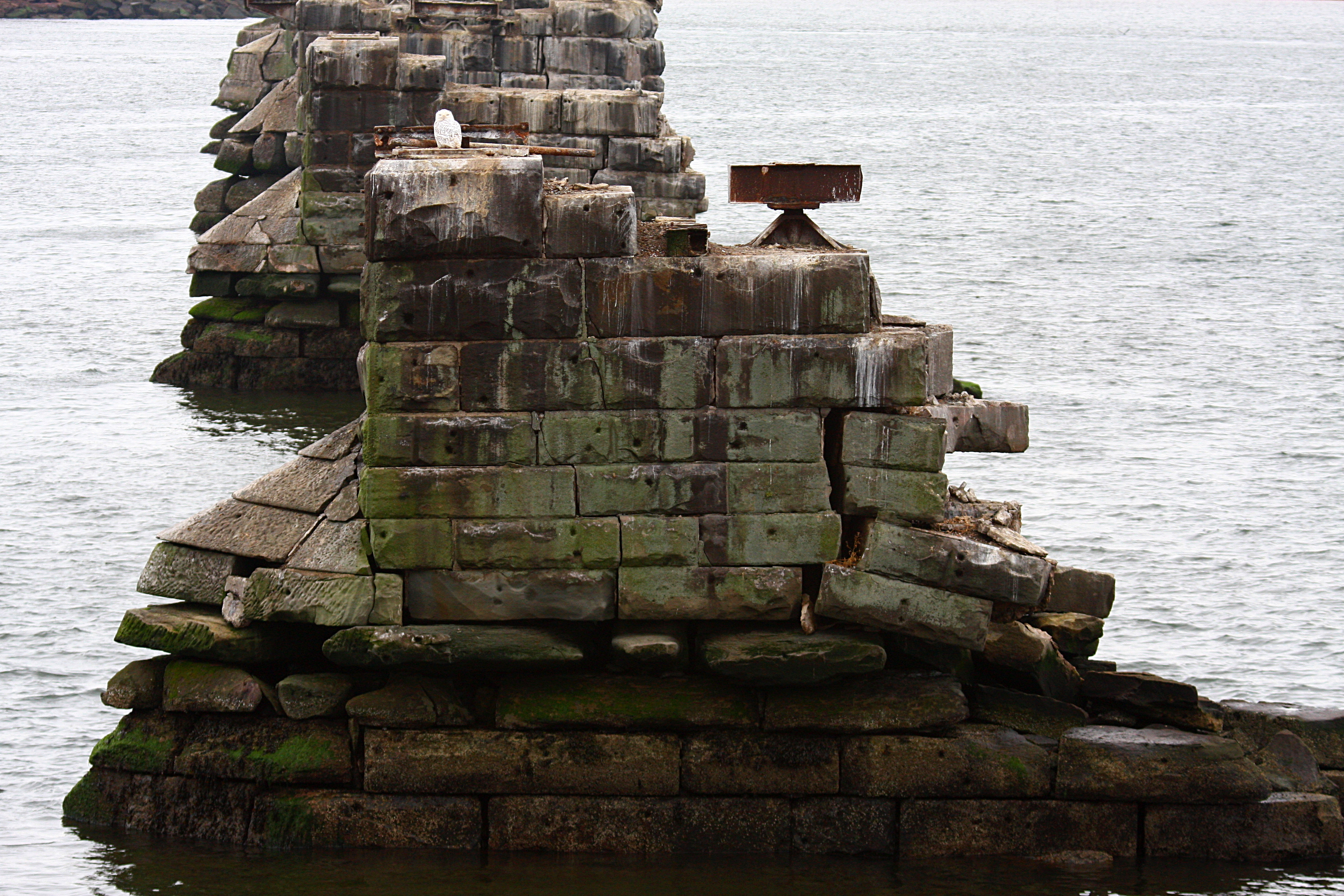
Snowy owl in the ruins of the old Hillsborough River Bridge, 2008.

In 1950 CNR structural engineers felt the bridge was unsafe for any rail traffic and the rails were removed while the railway instituted taxi service for passengers travelling to Murray Harbour, allowing them to board passenger trains at its terminus near the bridge abutment in Southport.

No longer used for rail traffic, CNR wished to rid itself of operating the bridge and tried to get the provincial government to take ownership. The provincial government, which had been getting away with having the federally owned railway company operate this important bridge for many years, sought to delay any handover and at one point in the early 1950s, CNR engineers barricaded the bridge to public travel, partly out of concern that the bridge was unsafe, and partly to pressure the provincial negotiators.

The provincial government was outraged and Premier J. Walter Jones staged a publicity stunt at the Charlottetown abutment of the bridge, boarding a bulldozer and demanding in front of local media, that the bridge be reopened.

CNR relented and reopened the bridge, making temporary repairs, however the long-term viability of the bridge, then approaching 85 years of age (when its 30-year service in New Brunswick was taken into account), was in doubt.

== Second bridge, 1962-present ==
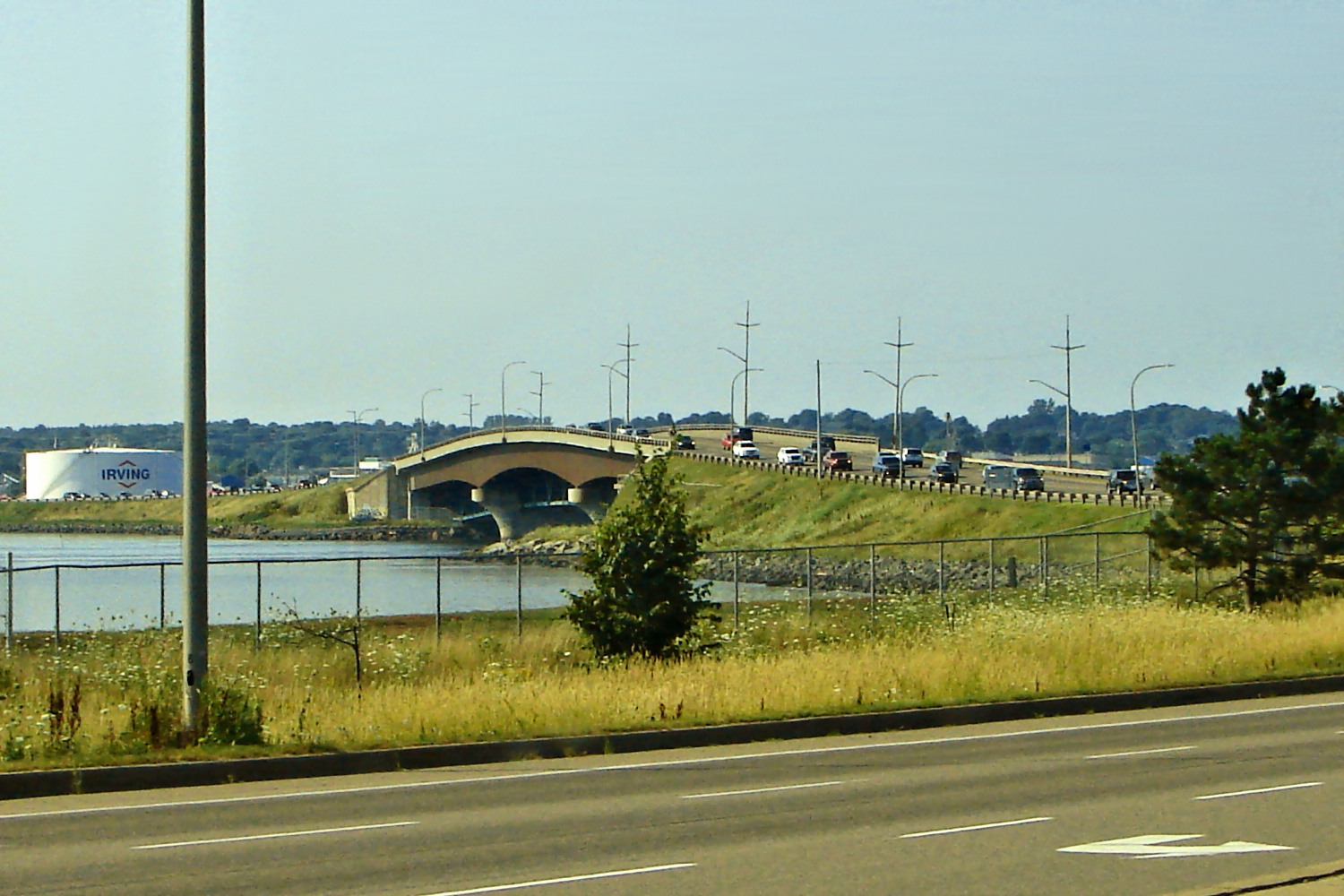
Hillsborough River Bridge seen from the Southport side in the summer of 2015.

By the mid-1950s, the federal government had begun to develop the Trans-Canada Highway network across the country. The Prince Edward Island component was planned between the ferry terminals in Borden and Wood Islands via Charlottetown.

As part of this national project, an improved crossing of the Hillsborough River was deemed necessary, however it required several years of negotiation over joint federal and provincial funding before construction could begin. A new 2-lane highway bridge opened in 1962 to carry Route 1 over the Hillsborough River parallel to, and immediately upstream of, the single lane railway bridge.

The new bridge used the original soil-infilled approach causeways on both sides of the river that had been used for the railway bridge. Thus, though the span is straight, the overall crossing takes a distinctive curving alignment. The causeways were widened to the Trans-Canada Highway standard width of 3 lanes (2 travel lanes and emergency shoulders) and lengthened to narrow the span to roughly half that of the railway bridge.

The new bridge structure was constructed using structural steel as an arched truss using 2 piers. The emergency shoulders on the bridge structure were occupied by concrete sidewalks.

The original railway bridge immediately downstream of the new highway bridge was dismantled and the iron structure was scrapped, although the stone piers were left in place. These became a nesting site for cormorants and terns for the next three decades (1960s to 1990s). Ice and wind and wave damage by the turn of the 21st century had caused the majority of the old piers to collapse and are now mostly invisible from the bridge.

=== Widening, 1995 ===
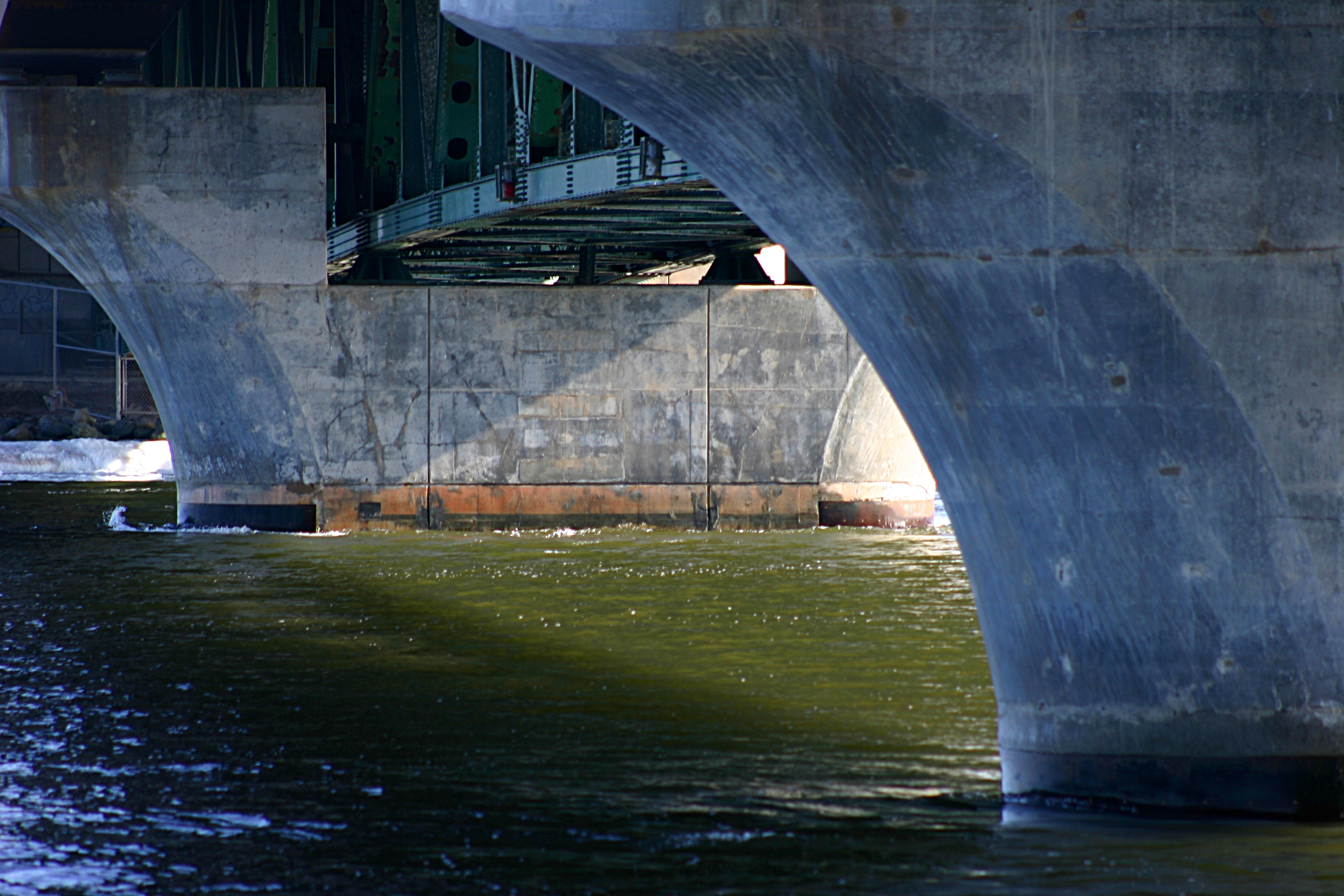
Under the Hillsborough River Bridge, 2007.

In 1992 the Government of Canada signed an agreement with Strait Crossing Joint Venture (SCJV), an international construction consortium, to build the Northumberland Strait Crossing Project (today known as the Confederation Bridge) between Prince Edward Island and New Brunswick. Part of the agreement negotiated with the Government of Prince Edward Island provided for a federal-provincial cost-sharing to have Strait Crossing Joint Venture take ownership of and expand the Hillsborough River Bridge from 2 lanes to 4.

This expansion had been studied since the late 1970s when traffic delays began to occur as residential development took place in areas east of Charlottetown, namely the communities of Bunbury, Southport, Kinlock, Keppoch and Cross Roads, creating changes in commuting patterns. Studies indicated that vehicle counts on the 2-lane bridge were approaching 30,000 trips per day.

SCJV expanded the bridge in 1995, placing additional continuous span girders on each side of the original structure with expanded piers, then removing of the guardrails and concrete sidewalk and bridge deck from the original structure, replacing it with an integrated deck. This work took place without any significant delays or closures. For taxation purposes, the Hillsborough River Bridge structure owned by SCJV is jurisdictionally within the town of Stratford; the municipal boundary between Stratford and Charlottetown is thus located at the western abutment of the bridge on the approach causeway.

=== Other works ===
Additional work was undertaken by the provincial government on the approach routes to the span, with additional infilling of Charlottetown Harbour to extend Water Street through the former railway yard (CN Rail abandoned rail service in PEI on December 31, 1989) and intersection with Grafton Street and Riverside Drive. Additional redesign work was undertaken on the Southport side of the bridge to allow for a more efficient traffic flow. In 2021 the province built an active transportation trail on the bridge for use by pedestrians and cyclists, in a construction effort that also included a new sewer line connecting Charlottetown to Stratford and bridge strengthening to accommodate both.

== See also ==
- List of bridges in Canada
