= Tea Hill Provincial Park =

Provincial park of Prince Edward Island, Canada

Coordinates: 46°11′46″N 63°03′46″W

Tea Hill Provincial Park is a provincial park in Prince Edward Island, Canada.

It is located in the town of Stratford.
