= Hillsborough River =

There are at least two rivers named the Hillsborough River:

- Hillsborough River (Florida), which flows through Tampa
- Hillsborough River (Prince Edward Island), which flows through Charlottetown
