= Hillsborough River (Prince Edward Island) =

River in Canada

Coordinates: 46°22′N 62°47′W

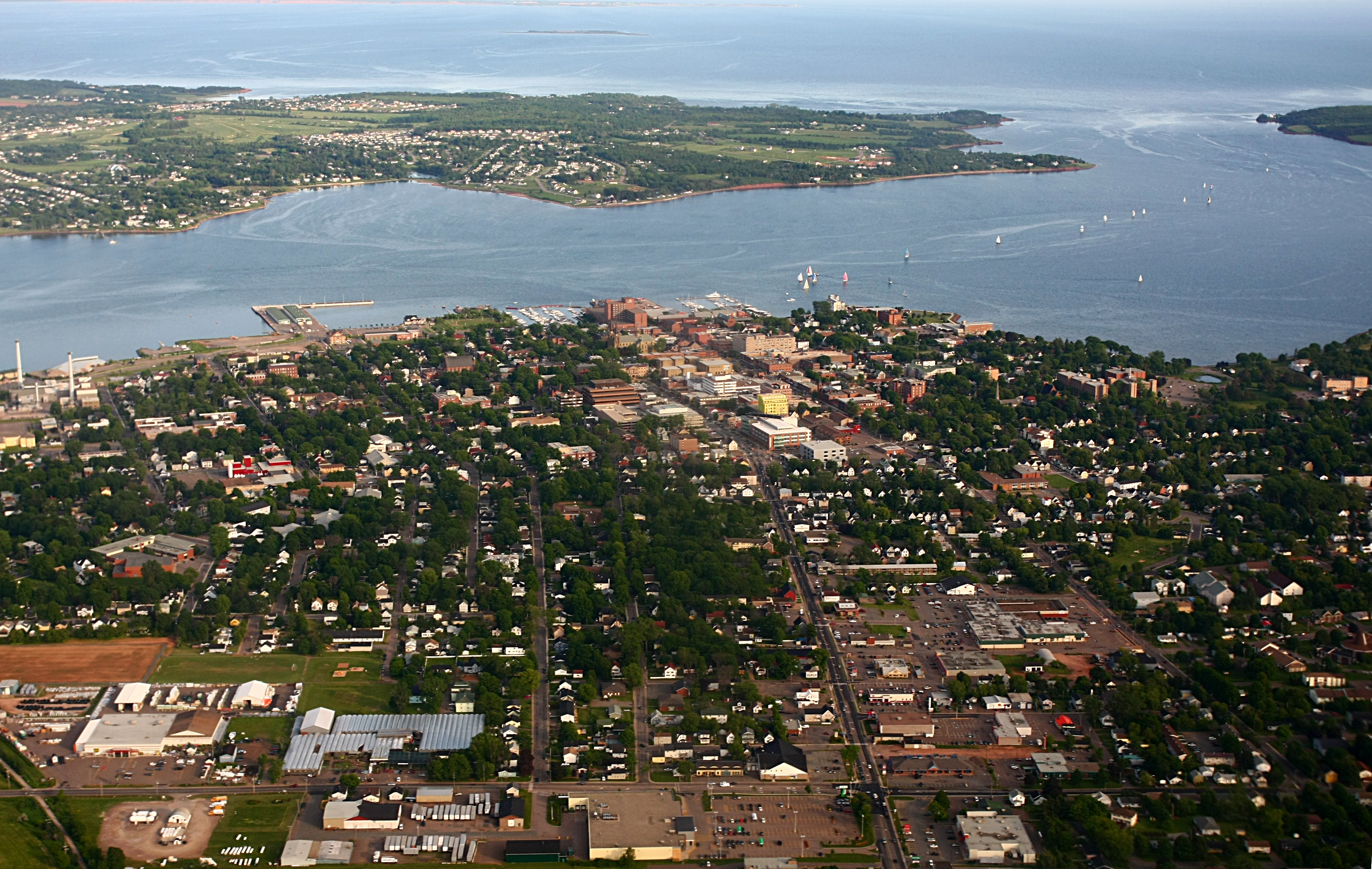
Mouth of the Hillsborough River at Charlottetown

The Hillsborough River, also known as the East River, is a Canadian river in northeastern Queens County, Prince Edward Island.

== History ==
=== Battle at Port-la-Joye ===
After the Siege of Louisbourg (1745) during King George's War, the New Englanders also captured Île Saint-Jean (modern Prince Edward Island). The New Englanders had a force of two warships and 200 soldiers stationed at Port-la-Joye. To regain Acadia, Jean-Baptiste Nicolas Roch de Ramezay was sent from Quebec to the region to join forces with the Duc d'Anville expedition. Upon arriving at Chignecto, he sent French officer Charles Deschamps de Boishébert et de Raffetot to Île Saint-Jean on reconnaissance to assess the size of the New England force. After Boishébert returned, Ramezay sent Joseph-Michel Legardeur de Croisille et de Montesson, along with over 500 men, 200 of whom were Mi'kmaq, to Port-la-Joye. In July, 1746, the battle happened near Rivière Nord-est ("Northeast River", the present-day Hillsborough). Montesson and his troops killed or imprisoned forty New Englanders. Montesson was commended for having distinguished himself in his first independent command.

According to the 1752 census, the Acadians arrived in Rivière Nord-est in 1750. The influential Acadian Joseph-Nicolas Gautier dit Ballair and his family moved from Annapolis Royal to Rivière Nord-est, at the location known today as Scotchfort.

As well, Jean Pitre's family and many from the Henry family arrived from Maitland, in Hants County, Nova Scotia, as part of the Acadian Exodus, to escape hostilities after the arrival of Protestants in Nova Scotia and the establishment of Halifax (1749).

== Rivers and highways ==
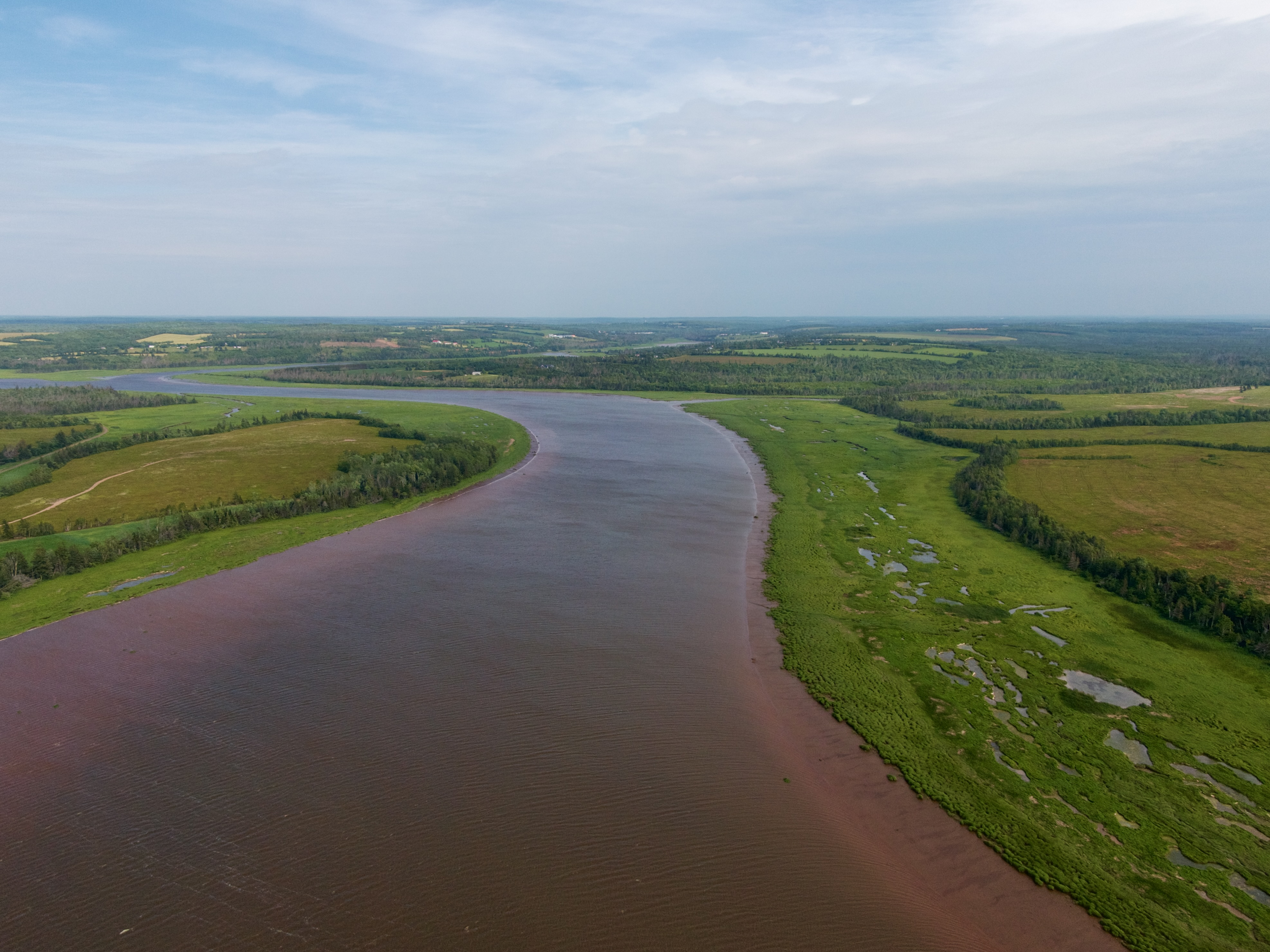
Hillsborough River near Scotchfort 4

From its source near the farming hamlet of Head of Hillsborough, in the northeastern part of the county, the river flows southwesterly, becoming a tidal estuary at Mount Stewart, which gradually widens from several dozen metres to approximately 1 km at its discharge point in Charlottetown Harbour. The river's total meander length is about 45 kilometres (28 mi), of which 12 kilometres (7 mi) forms an estuary.

The river was the 27th in Canada, and the first in Prince Edward Island, to be nominated to the Canadian Heritage Rivers System. The river's estuary fronts heritage agricultural communities, Acadian dykes, historic shipyards, and the Charlottetown waterfront, where the Fathers of Confederation landed. The river's freshwater portion flows through pristine forests and farming areas, as well as extensive wetlands. The river during its freshwater run resembles a typical stream in other Canadian provinces.

The river was bridged by the Prince Edward Island Railway between Charlottetown and Southport on the massive Hillsborough River Bridge, one of the longest railway bridges in eastern Canada, as well as one of the longest narrow-gauge railway bridges in the world, as well as on a much shorter crossing in Mount Stewart.

The modern highway bridge was constructed adjacent to the railway bridge between Charlottetown and Southport in 1962 and was modernized and expanded in 1995. Additional highway bridges cross the river at Mount Stewart and at several points upstream.

The river hosts a variety of recreational activities as well as quahog and oyster fisheries. The river suffers from high nitrate levels and surface runoff from over-farming and excess riparian zone development.

== See also ==
- List of rivers of Prince Edward Island
