= John Alexander Dewar =

John Alexander Dewar may refer to:

- John Alexander Dewar (1863 – 1945, farmer and political figure on Prince Edward Island.
- John Dewar, 1st Baron Forteviot, Scottish businessman, elder son of the founder of John Dewar & Sons company and a Liberal Member of Parliament
