= Emerald, Prince Edward Island =

Community in Prince Edward Island, Canada

Coordinates: 46.361°N 63.545°W

Location of Emerald in Prince Edward Island

Emerald is a rural community in the Canadian province of Prince Edward Island, located primarily in Prince County but also partially in Queens County.

A railway junction named Emerald Junction was located in the community from the 1880s until the abandonment of the railway in Prince Edward Island on December 31, 1989.

== See also ==
- List of communities in Prince Edward Island
