= Elizabeth Lee Owen Macdonald =

Canadian writer

Elizabeth Lee Macdonald (née Owen; 11 May 1835 – 12 July 1901) was a Canadian writer.

== Early life ==
Elizabeth was born on 11 May 1835 at Cardigan, Prince Edward Island. She was a daughter of Thomas Owen, the first postmaster general for Prince Edward Island, and Ann Campbell. While still young, her family moved to Charlottetown. Her brother Lemuel later served as the second premier of PEI.

== Career ==
While her husband was lieutenant-governor, she attended openings and closing of the provincial legislature, as well as various other special events. She also contributed her time and financial support to St. Peter's Cathedral in Charlottetown.

She contributed a series of nine articles describing life in Charlottetown fifty years early in the Prince Edward Island Magazine.

== Personal life ==
In 1863, she married Andrew Archibald Macdonald (1829–1912); although she was Anglican her husband was Catholic which was controversial at the time. The couple had four sons, including:

- Aeneas Adolph Macdonald (1864–1920), who served in the provincial legislature; he married Margaret Macdonald in 1904.

Macdonald died from complications due to diabetes in Charlottetown on 12 July 1901 at the age of 66.
