= Mount Stewart, Prince Edward Island =

Mount Stewart
- Rural municipality
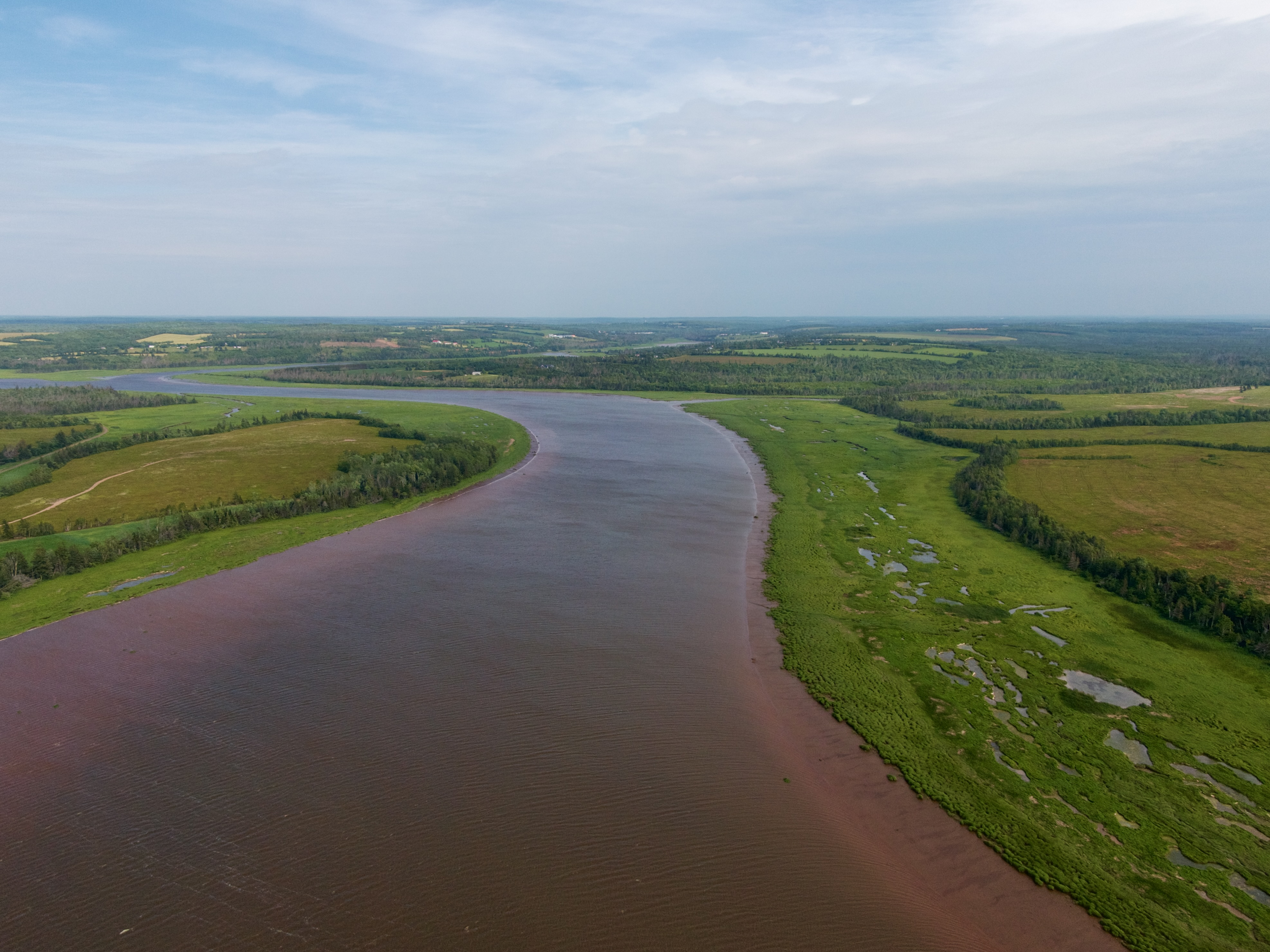
- Hillsborough River near Mount Stewart

- Mount Stewart in Prince Edward Island
- Coordinates: 46.365°N 62.867°W
- Country: Canada
- Province: Prince Edward Island
- County: Queens County

Population (2021)
  - Total: 226
- Time zone: AST
  - Summer (DST): ADT
- Area code: 902

Mount Stewart is a rural municipality in Prince Edward Island, Canada. It is located in the northeastern part of Queens County, at the head of the once-navigable portion of the Hillsborough River at the point where the river begins to narrow significantly. Mount Stewart had a population of 226 at the time of the 2021 Census.

The community played an important role in the province's early transportation history, being the site of a bridge over the river along the route between the capital at Charlottetown and the shire town of Kings County at Georgetown.

== History ==
In the early 1870s, the Prince Edward Island Railway ran its mainline between both communities through Mount Stewart. If any one wanted to travel to Georgetown or Souris from Charlottetown, they would have to come through or make a stop at Mount Stewart. Mount Stewart also came to be referred to as Mount Stewart Junction after the PEIR built a line northeast to Morell and Souris. During the 1930s, the community became the centre of all railway service accessing eastern PEI after the Hillsborough River Bridge carrying the railway line to Murray Harbour between Charlottetown and Southport was condemned. The CNR constructed what was known as the "Short Line" between Mount Stewart and Lake Verde, permitting rail traffic to continue to serve the southeastern part of the province. People would also use the railways to transport vegetables, potatoes, lumber, and other resources. The last train that came here was from Charlottetown in 1989, it was also when the railway stopped running.

== Demographics ==
Federal census population history of Mount Stewart
Year	Pop.	±%
1956	439	—
1961	433	−1.4%
1966	429	−0.9%
1971	413	−3.7%
1976	368	−10.9%
1981	364	−1.1%
1986	344	−5.5%
1991	315	−8.4%
1996	310	−1.6%
2001	312	+0.6%
2006	261	−16.3%
2011	225	−13.8%
2016	209	−7.1%
2021	226	+8.1%
Source: Statistics Canada

In the 2021 Census of Population conducted by Statistics Canada, Mount Stewart had a population of 226 living in 107 of its 118 total private dwellings, a change of 8.1% from its 2016 population of 209. With a land area of 1.52 km^{2} (0.59 sq mi), it had a population density of 148.7/km^{2} (385.1/sq mi) in 2021.

== Education ==
There is one school that is currently operating in Mount Stewart. It was built on May 7, 1976. It is located at 120 Main Street. There are approximately 160 students as of April 2013. The grades are kindergarten up to grade 8. In 2009 two schools joined Mount Stewart Consolidated, St. Teresa's and Tracadie Cross. After students finish grade 8, they go to Morell Regional High School for grades 9-12. The school that was operating before the current school is now being used for storage.

== Sports ==
Baseball in Mount Stewart and the surrounding areas was and still is very popular. The local teams have won the Atlantic championships multiple times over the years. They also had a team in the KCBL (Kings County Baseball League). Some of the local players went on to play in the Florida Rookie League, for university-level players who show dedication to playing pro ball.
