= Herbert James Palmer =

Canadian politician

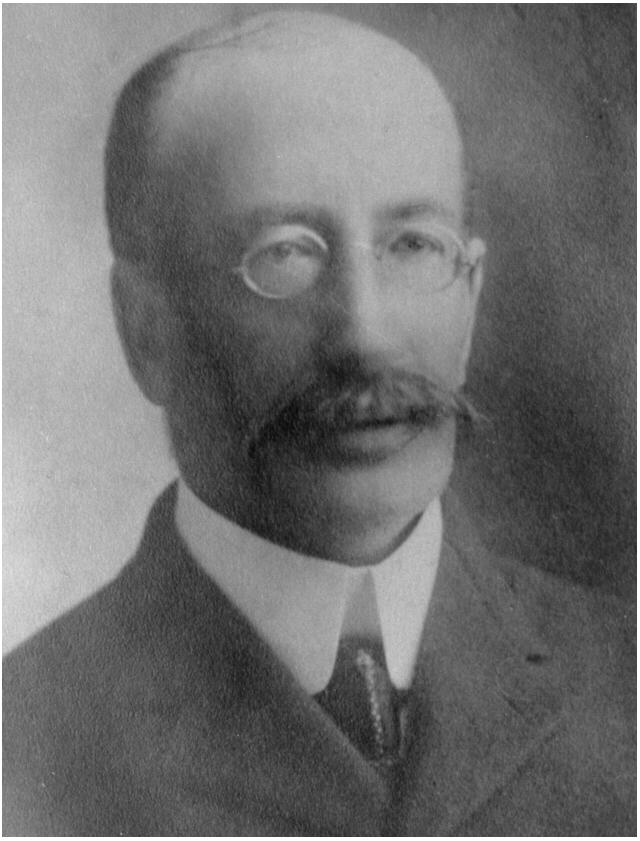

11th Premier of Prince Edward Island
- In office May 16, 1911 – December 2, 1911
- Monarch: George V
- Lieutenant Governor: Benjamin Rogers
- Preceded by: Francis Haszard
- Succeeded by: John A. Mathieson

Leader of the Prince Edward Island Liberal Party
- In office May 16, 1911 – January 3, 1912
- Preceded by: Francis Haszard
- Succeeded by: John Richards

MLA (Assemblyman) for 3rd Queens
- In office December 12, 1900 – November 15, 1911
- Preceded by: Frederick Peters
- Succeeded by: George F. Dewar

Personal details
- Born: August 26, 1851 Charlottetown, Prince Edward Island Colony
- Died: December 22, 1939 (aged 88) Charlottetown, Prince Edward Island, Canada
- Party: Liberal
- Spouse: Ada Millicent Patena (m. 1880)
- Relations: Edward Palmer (father)
- Children: 5
- Education: Prince of Wales College; University of King's College
- Occupation: Lawyer and director
- Profession: Politician

Herbert James Palmer (August 26, 1851 – December 22, 1939) was the 11th premier of Prince Edward Island and the son of former colonial Premier Edward Palmer.

Born in Charlottetown, Palmer was educated at Prince of Wales College and then at King's College in Windsor, Nova Scotia.

He was called to the bar in 1876 and became a Queen's Counsel in 1878. Palmer entered the provincial legislature as a Liberal upon winning a seat in the election of 1900. He served as Attorney-General at various times except between 1904 and 1908 when he was out of office. In May 1911 he became premier when Francis Longworth Haszard was appointed to the Supreme Court of the province. At the time, members of the legislature who became Premier were required to resign their seats and run for re-election in a by-election. Palmer did so but was defeated in the December by-election. He resigned as premier and returned to his law practice. The loss of Palmer's seat also caused the Liberal government to lose their majority in the legislature and the lieutenant governor asked the leader of the opposition, John A. Mathieson, to form a new government.
