= Vernon Bridge, Prince Edward Island =

Coordinates: 46.179°N 62.884°W

Location of Vernon Bridge in Prince Edward Island

Vernon Bridge is a settlement in Prince Edward Island. It is located within Lot 50.
