= Kinross, Prince Edward Island =

Coordinates: 46.157°N 62.813°W

Location of Kinross in Prince Edward Island

Kinross is a settlement in Prince Edward Island. It is named after Kinross in Scotland. It is within the census subdivision of Lot 57, Prince Edward Island. Kinross borders three other communities: Uigg, Orwell, and Lyndale.
