= John S. Martin (politician) =

Canadian politician (1855–1946)

John S. Martin (August 2, 1855 – June 29, 1946) was a farmer and political figure on Prince Edward Island. He represented 4th Queens in the Legislative Assembly of Prince Edward Island from 1912 to 1919 as a Conservative and was Speaker of the assembly from 1916 to 1917.

He was born in Kinross, the son of Samuel Martin and Sarah Campbell, and was educated in Uigg. In 1875, he married Hattie M. McKenzie.

He was defeated when he ran for reelection in 1919.
