= Confederation Trail =

Rail trail system in Prince Edward Island, Canada

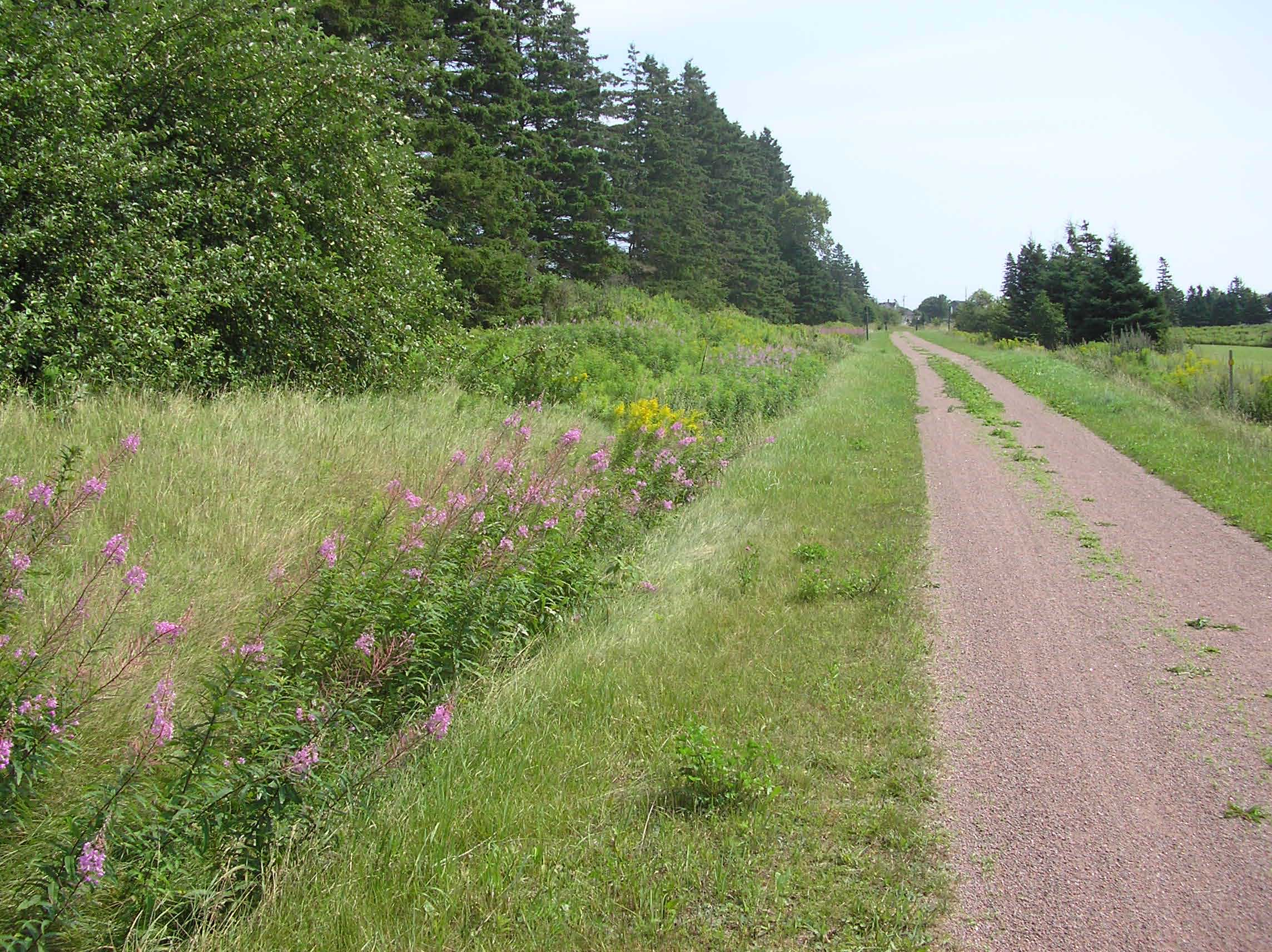
Confederation Trail

The Confederation Trail is a 273 kilometre long recreational rail trail system in the Canadian province of Prince Edward Island. It was developed in the 1990s, following the abandonment of all railway lines in the province on December 31, 1989, by Canadian National Railway.

== Description and history ==
Comprising almost the total mileage of the historic Prince Edward Island Railway, development of the Confederation Trail was encouraged by a rails to trails advocacy group founded at a meeting held in Charlottetown on August 3, 1989. Rails-to-Trails P.E.I. worked with local communities and individuals across the island, culminating in the decision by the provincial government to purchase the entire railway right-of-way from CN in 1994 after the company had removed all track. The vision of a multiuse linear park from one end of the island to the other was embraced by the provincial government, which manages operations through the Parks Division of Tourism, while the Properties section of the Department of Transportation handles all matters pertaining to the use of the trail other than public use as a biking or hiking trail.

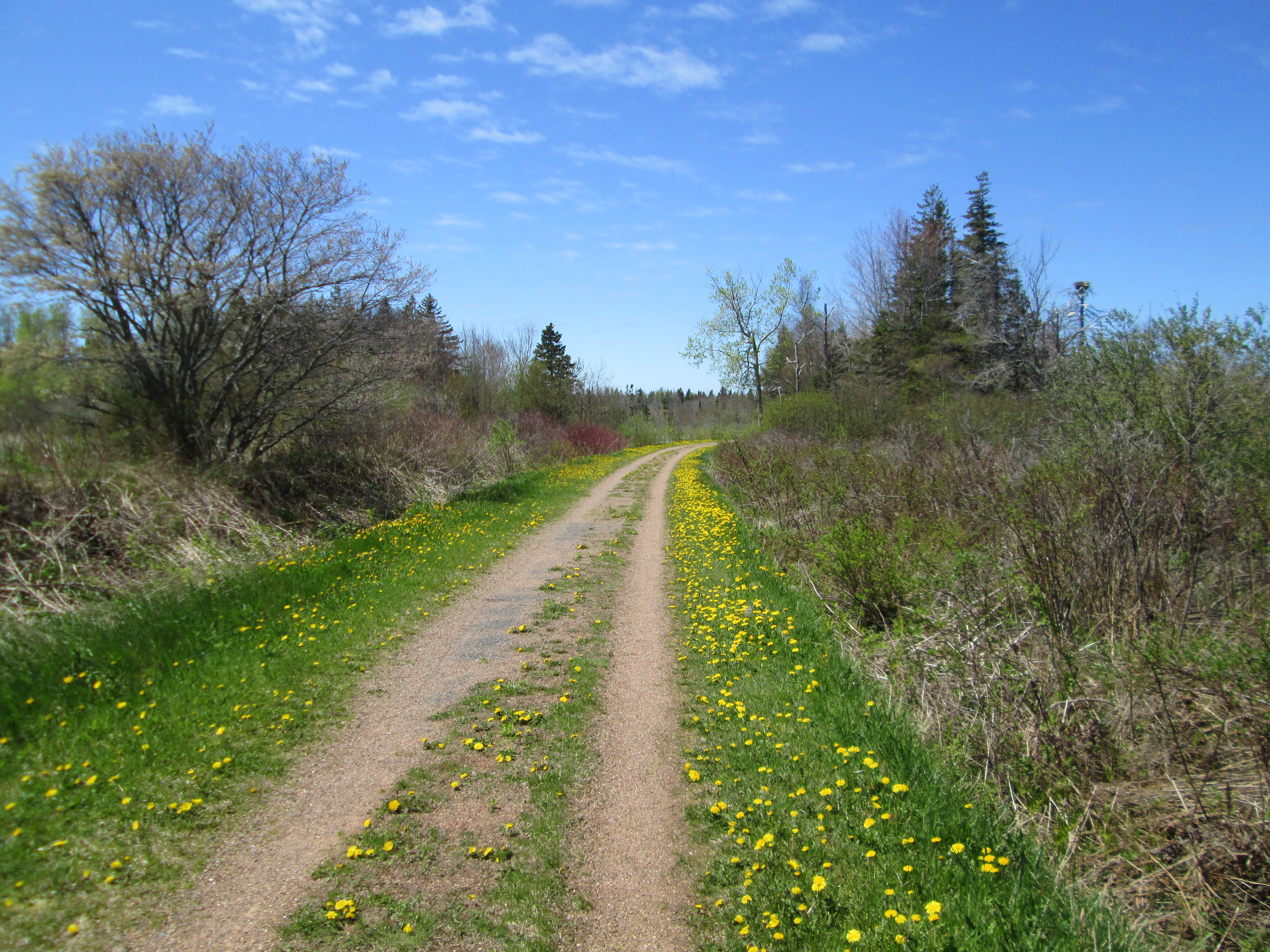
Confederation Trail near Morell, Prince Edward Island

In addition to provincial government employees, the development of the Confederation Trail was assisted by the Trans Canada Trail foundation and by various community groups, volunteers, and Canadian Forces engineers who volunteered in reconstructing abandoned railway bridges for recreational trail use across Canada.

Since its completion from Tignish to Elmira in 2000, the Confederation Trail has proven a popular recreational trail for residents and tourists. Given its railway heritage, the trail has little to no grades and is well drained. Stone dust has been placed over the traditional railway crushed rock ballast, providing a surface suitable for walking/running and biking. Horses are not allowed on the trail. The Confederation Trail remains a non-motorized path for most of the year except during the winter, when the PEI Snowmobile Association leases it, from December 1 to March 31 each year.

The entire trail system is marked with kilometre posts and directional and interpretive signage as well as benches, picnic table shelters, and scenic lookouts throughout. The trail winds through Prince Edward Island's agricultural and forested landscapes and is frequently crossed by public roads.

== Completed ==
As of 2025, the Confederation Trail had several major routes:

Main trail

- Tignish to O'Leary (45 km easy-to-moderate)
- O'Leary to Wellington (45 km easy-to-moderate)
- Wellington to Hunter River (65 km moderate-to-hard)
- Hunter River to Morell (65 km moderate-to-hard)
- Morell to Elmira (54 km moderate)

Branch trails

- Emerald to Borden-Carleton (18 km easy)
- Cardigan Junction to Montague (10 km easy)
- Royalty Junction to Charlottetown (8 km easy)
- Mt. Stewart to Georgetown (39 km moderate)
- Pisquid to Lake Verde 16 km (2 km hard, along Route 21)
- Cardigan Junction to Montague (10 km easy)
- New Harmony Junction to Souris (8 km easy)
- Stratford to Murray Harbour (80 km moderate)
