= Prince Edward Island Railway =

Historic Canadian railway

- Map of the Prince Edward Island Railway, c. 1912

Overview
- Headquarters: Charlottetown, Prince Edward Island
- Locale: Prince Edward Island, Canada
- Dates of operation: 1871–1918, merged into CNR, abandoned in 1989

Technical
- Track gauge: 1,435 mm (4 ft 8 1/2 in) standard gauge
- Previous gauge: 3 ft 6 in (1,067 mm) until 1930

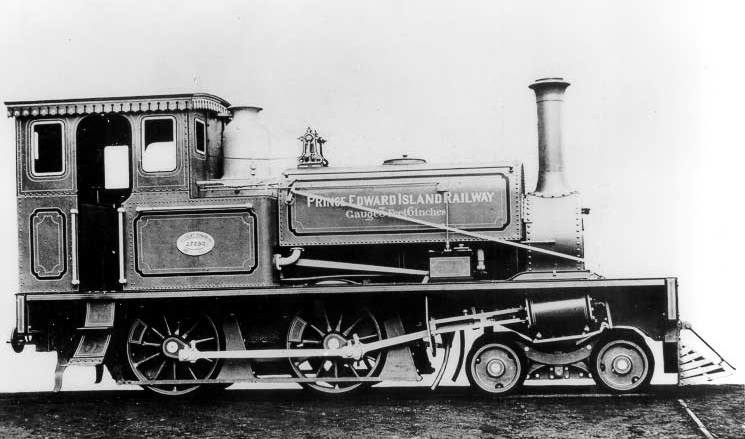
Typical of the narrow-gauge engines that served the PEIR, Engine Number 1 was a compact machine with a 4-4-0 layout. These engines proved unsuccessful, as they had been designed for use in warmer climates and lighter loads than those of PEI.

The Prince Edward Island Railway (PEIR) was a historic Canadian railway in Prince Edward Island (PEI). The railway ran tip-to-tip on the island, from Tignish in the west to Elmira in the west, with major spurs serving Borden-Carleton's train ferry dock, the capital in Charlottetown, Montague and Georgetown and the original eastern terminus at Souris. A major spur from Charlottetown served Murray Harbour on the south coast.

Construction began in 1871 but costs almost bankrupted the government by the next year, a problem that helped pave PEI's entrance into Confederation. The work was picked up by the Canadian Government Railways and largely completed by the mid-1880s. The PEIR saw heavy use, especially during World War II, but like many railways saw declining use through the 1970s. The line officially closed on 31 December 1989 and the rails removed between 1990 and 1992, with the provincial government receiving a one-time payment of $200 million to upgrade the road network in exchange for not opposing the closure.

The provincial government purchased the properties in 1994, and 75 per cent of the route now forms the basis of the Confederation Trail rail trail system. The station in Elmira at the eastern end of the line is now used as the Elmira Railway Museum.

== History ==
=== Construction ===
Located wholly within the province of Prince Edward Island, construction of the PEIR started in 1871, eventually financed by Canada. The line was initially built to 3 ft 6 in (1,067 mm) gauge, under the supervision of Chief Engineer John Edward Boyd a native of Saint John, New Brunswick, who first advocated the use of narrow gauge for the New Brunswick Railway in the 1860s, and was responsible for the first surveys of the Toronto, Grey and Bruce Railway and the Toronto and Nipissing Railway in Ontario. The PEIR was frequently criticized for its meandering path, reputedly caused by construction contractors who were paid by the mile; this may also be accounted for in economies taken by reducing the amount of grading and trenching required by going around hills and obstacles. At one point there was on average one railway station for every 2.5 miles (4 km) of track. The main line connected the northwestern port of Alberton (later extended to Tignish) with the Northumberland Strait ports of Summerside, Charlottetown, Georgetown, and Souris. By 1872, construction debts threatened to bankrupt the colony.

=== Confederation ===
The United Kingdom had consistently encouraged the small colony to enter into Canadian Confederation, something which it had been avoiding since playing host to the Charlottetown Conference a decade earlier. The railway construction debts pushed the colony into reconsidering Confederation, and following further negotiations, Prince Edward Island became a province of Canada on July 1, 1873.

The understated provision in the Prince Edward Island Terms of Union reads as follows:

That the railways under contract and in course of construction for the Government of the Island, shall be the property of Canada;

=== Canadian Government Railways ===
Thus the Government of Canada came to inherit the PEIR in 1874 at the same time as construction was progressing on the Intercolonial Railway (IRC), which would link the strategic winter ports of the Canadian Maritimes with Central Canada. New locomotives were purchased from the United Kingdom and from Canadian manufacturers along with new rail cars.

In 1885, a new line was built connecting the Charlottetown-Summerside main line at Emerald Junction with another Northumberland Strait port at Cape Traverse. From Cape Traverse, iceboats would cross the Abegweit Passage to Cape Tormentine, New Brunswick during the winter months.

Another new line was built east from Charlottetown to Murray Harbour, part of which included building the Hillsborough River Bridge, using a former IRC bridge over the Miramichi River at Newcastle, New Brunswick. Branches were also constructed at this time off PEIR lines to Vernon Bridge, Montague, and Elmira.

From 1915 to 1918, PEIR and IRC would come to be known collectively as the Canadian Government Railways (CGR), although each company would maintain its separate corporate identity and management.

The most revolutionary change to the PEIR occurred in 1915 when a new icebreaking railcar ferry called Prince Edward Island was ordered by the federal government, arriving from the United Kingdom with a capacity of 12 rail cars, however it would not be until 1917 that the port facilities at Port Borden and Cape Tormentine would be ready to handle the vessel. In the meantime, the Prince Edward Island continued to operate the service to the port of Pictou, Nova Scotia from Georgetown and Charlottetown for the next two years.

The new ferry port at Borden required the Cape Traverse-Emerald Junction line be modified, and a line was constructed to Borden, along with marshalling yards and other facilities. The Cape Traverse line would only last a few more years before being abandoned following the move to Borden. Up until this point, the PEIR was a completely captive system, having no need for interchange with mainland North American railways. Following the start of railcar service in 1917, the lines to Charlottetown and Summerside from Borden were dual-gauged, capable of handling mainland cars with the standard gauge of 1,435 mm (4 ft 8 1/2 in) and the PEIR's narrow gauge of 3 ft 6 in (1,067 mm).

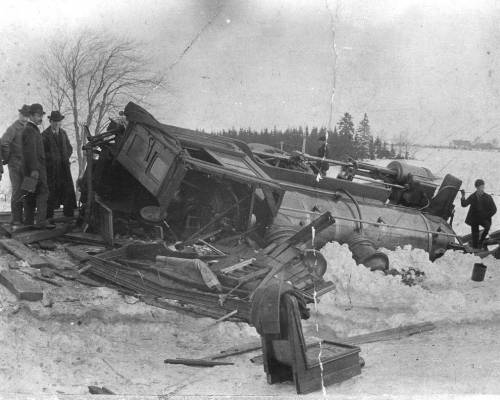
This steam engine left the rails near New Annan in 1903. No one was hurt, but another accident at the same location three years earlier scalded the engineer to death. Such accidents were common on the PEIR's narrow-gauge line, prior to gauge standardization, which was subject to shifts and frost heaves.

=== Canadian National Railways ===
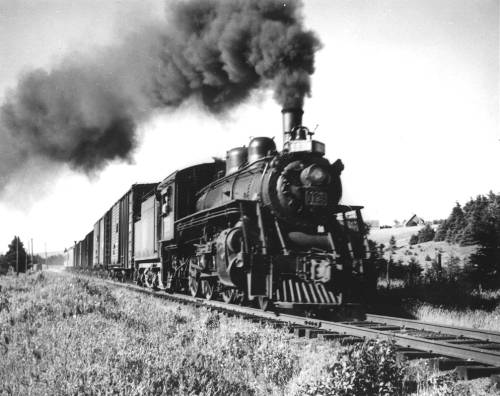
After re-gauging, PEIR could support standard gauge locomotives and trains. This example is pulling through the Maple Hill region in the spring of 1949.

In September 1918, management of CGR (including PEIR) was transferred to the newly nationalized Canadian Northern Railway (CNoR). These companies were assumed by a new Crown corporation established by the federal government in December 1918, called Canadian National Railways (CNR). By 1923 all corporate entities ceased to exist under CNR.

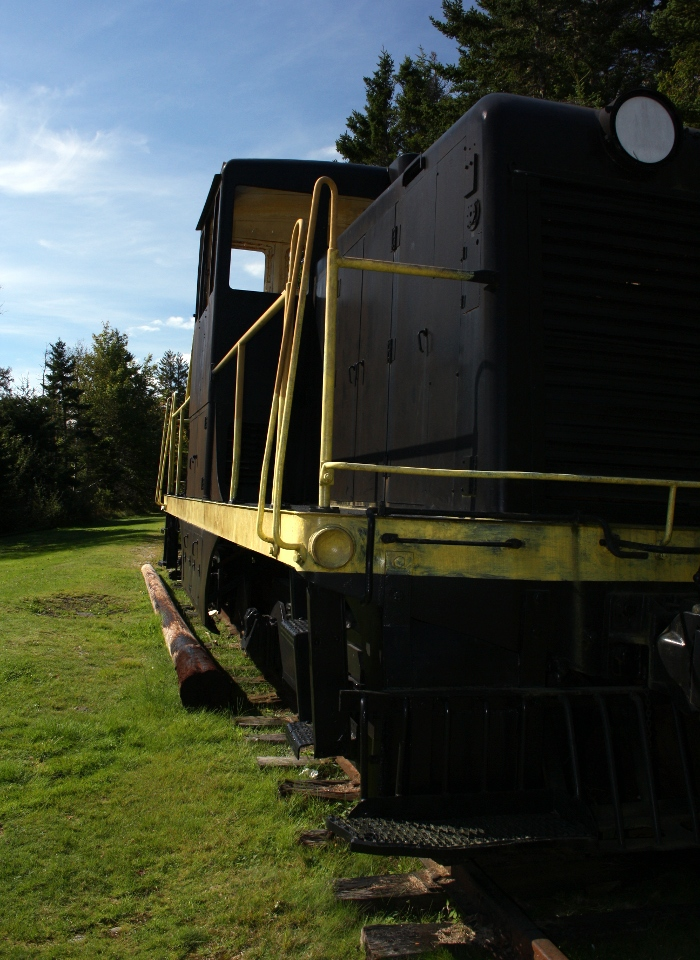
Diesel engine used in PEI in the 1950s. PEI had diesel service a full decade before the rest of Canada.

Soon after CNR took over, it was decided to standard gauge all narrow gauge trackage on Prince Edward Island. This was completed from Tignish to Charlottetown by 1924, and remaining lines in the east end of the province were completed by 1926 except for the Murray Harbour line which was standard gauged by September 1930.

The last significant railway construction on Prince Edward Island occurred during the early 1930s when the Hillsborough River Bridge carrying the Murray Harbour line over the Hillsborough River was unable to handle the heavier standard gauge cars, thus a 10-mile (16.1 km) connecting track called the Short Line was built from a point at Maple Hill Junction on the Mount Stewart Jct.-Georgetown line, to connect with the Murray Harbour track at Lake Verde Junction. In 1951, the Hillsborough River bridge was deemed too weak to carry even the lightest engines and cars, thus the trackage was removed and trains trying to reach Southport on the opposite side of Charlottetown Harbour would have to run over 30 miles (48.3 km) via Mount Stewart Junction and the Short Line.

CNR was busy on Prince Edward Island during the Second World War when a 2-mile (3.2 km) spur line was built from St. Eleanors, west of Summerside, to service a new air force base (CFB Summerside), and the railway was pressed into service to supply a radar base in Tignish, as well as a flight training school in Mount Pleasant, midway between Summerside and Tignish.

Increased use of diesel locomotives in North America during and after the Second World War saw CNR completely dieselize its operations on Prince Edward Island by the late 1940s as a means to save money on hauling bulk coal to the province. This meant that Prince Edward Island rail lines had diesel locomotives fully one decade before the rest of Canada saw the last of steam, giving the province a prominent place in Canadian railway history as one of the first regional dieselization projects.

=== Rise of automobiles and trucks ===
The rising popularity of automobiles travelling on government-funded all-weather highways saw passenger rail traffic decline sharply during the 1950s and into the 1960s. The last passenger train on Prince Edward Island operated in 1968, being replaced by buses thereafter.

CN (name change to Canadian National Railway or acronym CN in 1960) was a major presence in Prince Edward Island's economy, from operating the freight and passenger railway (and later bus) services, to a large fleet of company owned and operated ferries. The ferry system was noteworthy by the fact that it was mandated by Prince Edward Island's "Terms of Union" under the British North America Act of Canadian Confederation, to provide "efficient steamship service." This required the use of icebreakers, some of which were the largest of their kind in the world at one time.

=== Decline ===
Trucks soon began to take traffic away from freight operations on Prince Edward Island, particularly as CNR improved the ferry system to accept more road vehicles. By the 1970s, critical agricultural cargo such as the potato harvests were increasingly transferring to trucks with each successive season. As a result, CN increasingly began to avoid investing capital into improving railway infrastructure in the province. In a classic "demarketing" strategy, CN's deteriorating track conditions resulted in further loss of service to trucks.

By the early 1980s CN made it clear the days of its railway operations on Prince Edward Island were numbered, but Island politicians at the provincial and federal level managed to dissuade CN from abandoning. The renewed talk of building a highway/railway causeway across Abegweit Passage (the Confederation Bridge) in 1985–1986, following aborted attempts at building one in 1957 and 1965–1969, saw CN accelerate its attempts to withdraw railway service on Prince Edward Island.

=== Preservation ===
In 1975 the railway station in Elmira was re-opened to become the Island's first railway museum. The museum is housed in the actual Elmira railway station. The museum originally included two former Canadian National Railway passenger cars: one former wood sided baggage car and a steel railway post office (RPO) car. In the 1990s arson claimed the baggage car. Approximately a decade later, RPO was scrapped having succumbed to age and a lack of preservation activities. The trucks from the baggage car are still on the property. Several railway cars were on display at the provincially operated railway museum at Elmira until the mid-2000s but have since been scrapped due to neglect on the part of the PEI Museum & Heritage Foundation. An ex-CN caboose 78431 was acquired and moved to museum in 2009.

In 1990, a diesel locomotive (class MLW RSC-14 number 1762) donated to Summerside several years earlier, needed to be moved to nearby Kensington. Although now abandoned, the railway's tracks were still intact between both locations, except for several grade crossings at local roads where rails had been removed. The locomotive was towed by construction machinery across temporary tracks built over these roads to its new location, where it remains on display as part of a community-operated railway museum. The former Kensington Railway Station was designated a National Historic Site of Canada.

Another railway car is currently undergoing preservation at Borden-Carleton. This car is a plywood sided, former CNR, caboose and is located adjacent to a replica railway station. Both can be seen from the Confederation Bridge.

Two former railway tank cars reside beside the railway on the property of Island Construction on the Sherwood Road in Charlottetown. Both tank cars are adjacent to the railway trail can be easily seen and photographed from the trail. These tank cars are 36' long each. During the final years of railway operation on PEI these tank cars could be seen parked in the Borden railway yard and were used to store fuel oil for the ferry boats. Both tank cars are painted a light blue colour (the same paint scheme they featured during their railway service).

== Route ==
The western end of the PEIR starts in Tignish, abutting Church Street which forms the downtown axis. A wye-junction just west of the end serves as a turnaround, running north to Maple Street. The line initially runs west-southwest out of town but soon turns south towards the northern edge of the original western terminus of the line at Alberton. Here the line folds back on itself, leaving town west-northwest almost parallel to the incoming line, an artifact of its later extension. The line originally bent south to run through town to the docks at Northport. The line to Northport was turned into a spur by building a large wye junction at the sharp curve that developed when the extension was added.

The line continues westward, avoiding Cascumpec Bay, which extends inland to the west for some distance. This takes the line through Elmsdale and O'Leary, where it starts bending back toward the east and south, running through Wellington (and forming Wellington Station). Here it turns east to Summerside. Just west of Summerside a wye was built to provide a spur line to service Summerside Airport, running along the eastern side of the airport.

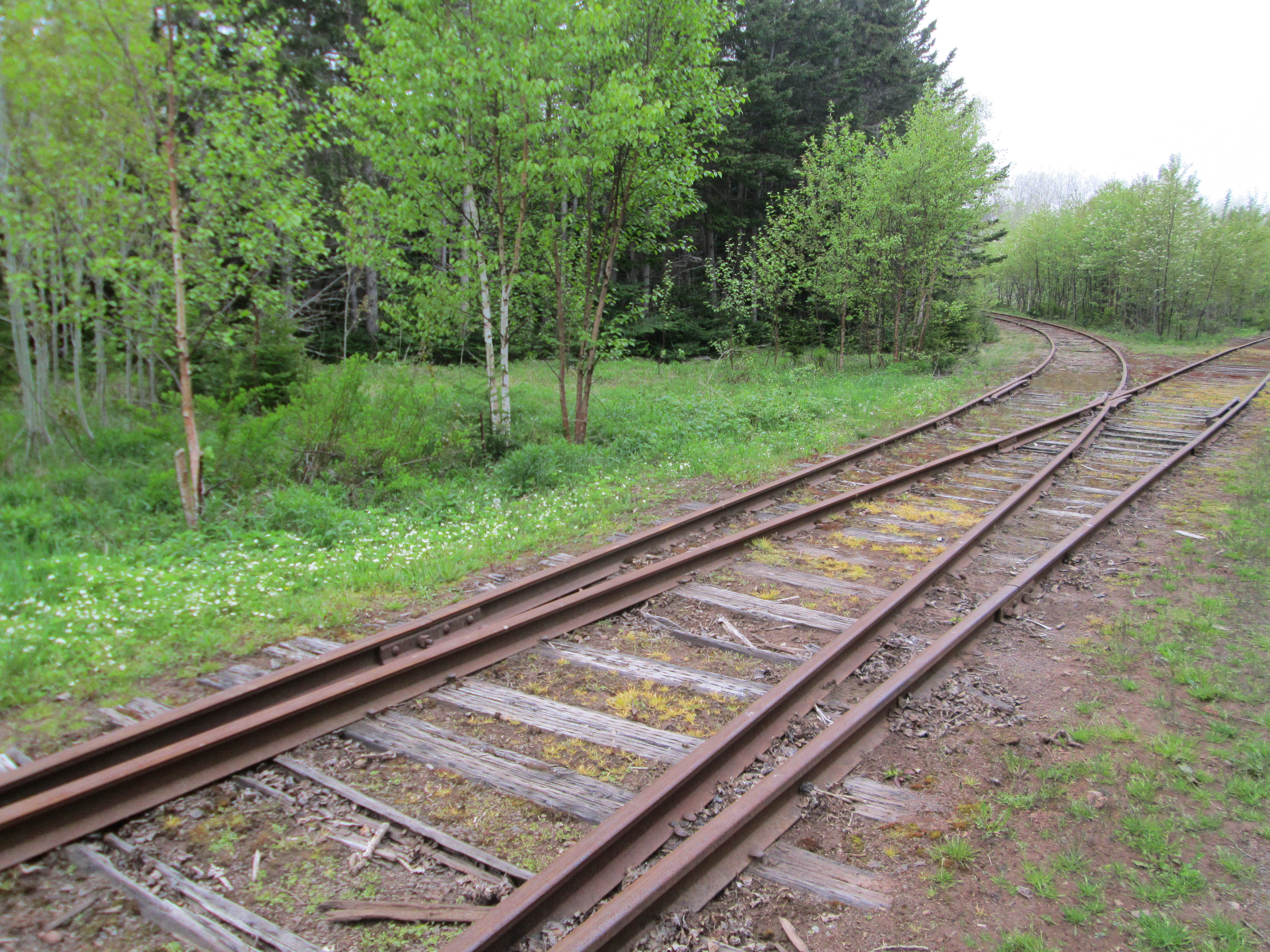
Train tracks. Part of the PEI Railway Museum, Elmira, PEI.

The line continues eastward out of Summerside to the New Annan area, where several large potato processing factories were built. Today this is the site of major factories for Cavendish Farms, which runs two dozen factories in this area. The line runs through Kensington and then turns south to Emerald Junction, where a wye junction splits off a spur leading southwest to Borden-Carleton, serving the former ferry docks. The line continues east from the junction, running east and south to Royalty Junction, just north of Charlottetown. Here a wye formed a spur serving the downtown area.

The line continues away from Charlottetown running east-northeast to Mount Stewart, where it splits in a wye just west of town. The mainline continues northeast, while a major spur bends south and then southwest for the run to Montague Junction. Here a wye forms a spur running southwest to Montague and southeast and Georgetown. The mainline continues out of Mount Stewart and passes through Morell, and, on the eastern side of town, begins to parallel the northern coast of the island as far as Saint Peter's Bay. Here it leaves the coast and continues eastward to a wye at Harmony Junction, where it originally looped back westward and then south for the short run to Souris. The Harmony wye made the Souris line a spur, with the mainline continuing east to its ultimate end in Elmira. Like the western end, a wye junction and spur just west of Elmira allowed the trains to turn around.

The Murray Harbour Line started at the end of the mainline spur in Charlottetown, crossing the Hillsborough River Bridge (the original pilings can still be seen) before bending sharply to the northeast through Bunbury. From here it runs roughly eastward to Lake Verde, where a wye provides a spur running south a short distance to a large turning loop at Vernon Bridge. With the closing of the Hillsborough bridge, a second wye was added just to the east of the first, spurring off the Short Line that runs northward to meet the Montague/Georgetown spur just south of Mount Stewart, near Maple Hill. The mainline of the Murray Harbour Line continues eastward a short distance before turning south at Hermitage, and then eastward again when it meets the Belle River on the south coast, running the remaining distance to Murray Harbour. A spur was later added in the Belle River area to Wood Islands. This collection of spurs on the PEIR is the only area that has not been fully converted to rail trail use, with several sections currently undeveloped.

Like many lines of the era, small whistle-stop towns sprang up all along the line, typically where the railway crossed an existing road. These often bear the terms "Junction", "Crossing" or "Station" as part of their names. Many of these exist only as names on a map today, the dwellings long since gone.

Due to its relatively recent abandonment, and especially due to maintenance as part of the rail trail conversion, the route of PEIR remains easily visible in aerial and satellite photos.

9==Rolling stock==

=== Narrow Gauge Locomotives ===
Image	Number	Builder	Type	Date	Works number	Notes
	1st # 1	Hunslet Engine Company	4-4-0T	1872	84	Scrapped prior to 1880
	2nd # 1	Mason Machine Works	0-4-4F	1873	531	Purchased from New Brunswick Railway 1880 - Scrapped 1901–04
	3rd # 1	Canadian Locomotive Company	4-4-0	1904	616	Renumbered CNR class X-4-a #10 - Scrapped 12/1924
	1st # 2	Hunslet Engine Company	4-4-0T	1872	85	Sold to Harbour Grace Railway 1881
	2nd # 2	Mason Machine Works	0-4-4F	1873	532	Purchased from New Brunswick Railway 1880 - Scrapped after 1904
	1st # 3	Hunslet Engine Company	4-4-0T	1872	86	Sold to Harbour Grace Railway 1881
	2nd # 3	Canadian Locomotive Company	4-4-0	1882	227	Scrapped 9/1920
	1st # 4	Hunslet Engine Company	4-4-0T	1872	87	Sold to Harbour Grace Railway 1881
	2nd # 4	Canadian Locomotive Company	4-4-0	1882	228	Scrapped 9/1920
	1st # 5	Hunslet Engine Company	4-4-0T	1872	88	Sold to Harbour Grace Railway 1881
	2nd # 5	Canadian Locomotive Company	4-4-0	1882	229	Scrapped 9/1920
	1st # 6	Hunslet Engine Company	4-4-0T	1872	89	Sold to Harbour Grace Railway 1881
	2nd # 6	Canadian Locomotive Company	4-4-0	1882	230	Scrapped 9/1920
	1st # 7	Hawthorn Leslie and Company	4-4-0T	1872	225	Scrapped prior to 1884
	2nd # 7	Canadian Locomotive Company	4-4-0	1884	294	Renumbered CNR class X-4-a 1st # 15 - Scrapped 2/1921
	1st # 8	Hawthorn Leslie and Company	4-4-0T	1872	226	Scrapped 1884–89
	2nd # 8	Canadian Locomotive Company	4-4-0	1899	470	Renumbered CNR class X-4-a 1st # 16 - Scrapped 2/1923
	9	Hawthorn Leslie and Company	4-4-0T	1872	227	Scrapped after 1904
	1st # 10	Hawthorn Leslie and Company	4-4-0T	1872	228	Scrapped 1885–87
	2nd # 10	Canadian Locomotive Company	4-4-0	1887	326	Renumbered CNR class X-4-a 1st # 17 - Scrapped 7/1923
	1st # 11	Baldwin Locomotive Works	4-4-0	1874	3535	Scrapped 1901–04
	2nd # 11	Canadian Locomotive Company	4-4-0	1904	617	Renumbered CNR class X-4-a 1st # 18 - Scrapped 12/1924
	12	Baldwin Locomotive Works	4-4-0	1874	3536	Scrapped after 1904
	13	Baldwin Locomotive Works	4-4-0	1874	3537	Scrapped after 1904
	14	Baldwin Locomotive Works	4-4-0	1874	3538	Scrapped after 1904
	15	Canadian Locomotive Company	4-4-0	1876		Scrapped after 1904
	16	Canadian Locomotive Company	4-4-0	1876		Scrapped after 1904
	17	Canadian Locomotive Company	4-4-0	1876		Scrapped after 1904
	18	Canadian Locomotive Company	4-4-0	1876		Scrapped after 1904
	1st # 19	Canadian Locomotive Company	0-4-4F	1880		Scrapped 1899–1907
	2nd # 19	Canadian Locomotive Company	4-4-0	1904	625	Displayed at the Louisiana Purchase Exposition; Delivered as # 28 and renumbered in 1907; Became CNR class X-4-a # 19; Sold 11/1923 to Lamoreux-Kelly Co. Montreal
	1st # 20	Canadian Locomotive Company	0-4-4F	1880		Scrapped prior to 1899
	2nd # 20	Canadian Locomotive Company	4-4-0	1899	471	Became CNR class X-4-a # 20 - Sold 11/1923 to Lamoreux-Kelly Co., Montreal
	21	Canadian Locomotive Company	4-4-0	1884	295	Became CNR class X-4-a # 21 - Scrapped 2/1921
	22	Canadian Locomotive Company	4-4-0	1900	496	Became CNR class X-4-a # 22 - Scrapped 2/1923
	23	Canadian Locomotive Company	4-4-0	1900	497	Became CNR class X-4-a # 23 - Sold 11/1923 to Lamoreux-Kelly Co., Montreal
	24	Canadian Locomotive Company	4-4-0	1901	520	Became CNR class X-4-a # 24 - Sold 11/1923 to Lamoreux-Kelly Co., Montreal
	25	Canadian Locomotive Company	4-4-0	1901	521	Became CNR class X-4-a # 25 - Scrapped 7/1923
	26	Canadian Locomotive Company	4-4-0	1904	618	Became CNR class X-4-a # 26 - Scrapped 12/1924
	27	Canadian Locomotive Company	4-4-0	1904	619	Became CNR class X-4-a # 27 - Sold 11/1923 to Lamoreux-Kelly Co., Montreal
	2nd # 28	Canadian Locomotive Company	4-6-0	1907	781	Became CNR class X-5-a # 28 - Scrapped 5/1927
	29	Canadian Locomotive Company	4-6-0	1907	782	Became CNR class X-5-a # 29 - Scrapped 5/1927
	30	Canadian Locomotive Company	4-6-0	1907	783	Became CNR class X-5-a # 30 - Scrapped 5/1927
	31	Canadian Locomotive Company	4-6-0	1907	784	Became CNR class X-5-a # 31 - Scrapped 5/1927
	32	Canadian Locomotive Company	4-6-0	1918	1521	Became CNR class X-5-b # 32 - Scrapped 12/1932
	33	Canadian Locomotive Company	4-6-0	1918	1522	Became CNR class X-5-b # 33 - Scrapped 12/1932
	34	Canadian Locomotive Company	4-6-0	1918	1523	Became CNR class X-5-b # 34; Operated the last narrow-gauge train on Prince Edward Island 27 September 1930; Scrapped 12/1932
	35	Canadian Locomotive Company	4-6-0	1918	1524	Became CNR class X-5-b # 35 - Scrapped 12/1932
	36	Davenport Locomotive Works	0-4-0T	1910		Purchased from G.A.Morrison 1918; Renumbered CNR class X-1-a # 1 Sold 4/1930 to H.N.Price Moncton

== Diesel locomotives ==
image	Numbers	Builder	Type	Class	Built	Notes
	7751, 7752	General Electric	44 Ton			First diesels on PEI
	7800-7817	General Electric	70 Ton			Renumbered to 26–43
	1615, 1616 and 1617	Canadian Locomotive Company	H12-44			
	1700–1734	Montreal Locomotive Works	RSC-13			Scrapped. Trucks to RSC-14 fleet.
	1750–1787	Montreal Locomotive Works	RSC-14	MR-14b and MR-14c	1975–1976	

=== Railcars ===
Steven Boyko notes on his blog

Side note: RDC D302 was tested on PEI in March 1958 but "it proved unsuitable because of difficulties it encountered crossing the ferry ramp, and negotiating the sharp turns between Borden and Charlottetown".

=== Ferry service ===
The following vessels were owned and operated by CNR/CN (1918–1977), CN Marine (CN subsidiary, 1977–1986) or by successor Marine Atlantic (post-1986) on the Northumberland Strait ferry service:

- Prince Edward Island (1915–1968)*
- Scotia I (various times 1901–1955)*
- Charlottetown (1931–1941)*
- Abegweit (1947–1982)*
- Scotia II (various times 1915–1968)*
- Confederation (1962–1975)
- John Hamilton Gray (1968–1997)*
- Lucy Maude Montgomery (1969–1973)
- Holiday Island (1971–1997)
- Vacationland (1971–1997)
- Abegweit (1982–1997)*

* denotes combination train ferry/ferry

== See also ==
- Canadian Government Railways
- Canadian National Railway
- Confederation Trail
- Marine Atlantic
