= James Kennedy (Canadian politician) =

Canadian merchant and politician

James Kennedy (May 14, 1869 – April 23, 1915) was a merchant and political figure in Prince Edward Island, Canada. He represented 4th Prince in the Legislative Assembly of Prince Edward Island from 1908 to 1915 as a Conservative member.

He was born in Breadalbane, Prince Edward Island, the son of Samuel Kennedy and Christy MacKinnon, of Scottish descent. He worked for the Prince Edward Island Railway for two years and then set up in business as a general merchant in Breadalbane, later moving to Kensington. In 1889, he married Mary Gillis.

Kennedy died in office in Kensington at the age of 45.

His brother Murdock also served in the provincial assembly.
