= George F. Dewar =

Canadian politician (1865–1961)

George Forbes Dewar (December 12, 1865 – November 25, 1961) was a physician and political figure in Prince Edward Island, Canada. He represented 3rd Queens in the Legislative Assembly of Prince Edward Island from 1911 to 1915 as a Conservative member.

He was born in New Perth, Prince Edward Island, the son of Robert Dewar and Jessie Dewar. Dewar obtained a teacher's licence from Prince of Wales College and then went on to study medicine at McGill University, receiving an M.D. there in 1893. He set up practice in Southport. In 1900, he married Marion Isabella McLeod. Dewar was elected in a 1911 by-election held after Herbert James Palmer was named premier and so was required to run for reelection. As a result of Palmer's defeat, the Liberals lost their majority in the assembly and a new general election was held later that year.
