= Aeneas A. Macdonald =

Canadian politician

Aeneas Adolph Macdonald (November 30, 1864 – June 30, 1920) was a lawyer and political figure on Prince Edward Island. He represented 2nd Kings in the Legislative Assembly of Prince Edward Island from 1912 to 1915 as a Conservative.

He was born in Georgetown, Prince Edward Island, the son of Andrew A. Macdonald and Elizabeth L. Owen. He was educated at St. Dunstan's College and Prince of Wales College. He was called to the bar in 1890. In 1904, he married Margaret Macdonald. Macdonald served as chairman of the Relief Committee of the Canadian Patriotic Society which looked after soldier's families following World War I.

He was named a probate judge in 1916. He also served as private secretary to his uncle Augustine Colin Macdonald, lieutenant-governor of the province.
