= Murdock Kennedy =

Canadian politician

Murdock Kennedy (March 25, 1873 – 1950) was a merchant and political figure in Prince Edward Island, Canada. He represented 1st Queens in the Legislative Assembly of Prince Edward Island from 1906 to 1927 as a Conservative member.

He was born in Breadalbane, Prince Edward Island, the son of Samuel Kennedy and Christy MacKinnon. In 1894, he married Margaret Davison Biggar. Kennedy was first elected to the provincial assembly in a 1906 by-election held after the death of George Simpson. He served in the province's Executive Council as Provincial Secretary-Treasurer and Commissioner of Agriculture. Kennedy resigned his cabinet post in 1913 because he was opposed to the operation of automobiles on public roads, which was supported by the government of the time.

His brother James also served in the provincial assembly.
