= Michael C. Delaney =

Canadian politician

- Born: November 20, 1849; Malpeque, Prince Edward Island
- Died: January 20, 1918 (aged 68)
- Occupation: Merchant Politician

Michael C. Delaney (November 20, 1849 – January 20, 1918) was a merchant and politician.

== Life ==
He was born in Malpeque, Prince Edward Island, the son of John Delaney and Mary Quigley. Delaney sold agricultural products; his two sons later joined him in the business. In 1871, he married Altimira Jane Robinson. Delaney was an unsuccessful candidate for a seat in the provincial assembly in 1904 and 1908. He was first elected to the provincial assembly in a 1909 by-election held after Joseph Read was unseated (or resigned his seat, according to some sources). He was defeated when he ran for reelection in 1915.
