= Hector Dobie =

Canadian politician

Hector D. Dobie (September 7, 1860 – April 21, 1954) was a farmer and political figure on Prince Edward Island. He represented 3rd Prince in the Legislative Assembly of Prince Edward Island from 1908 to 1915 as a Conservative.

He was born in St. John's, Newfoundland, the son of the Reverend Robert T. Dobie, and came to Prince Edward Island with his family in 1875. Dobie married Priscilla Dougherty in 1887. He operated a farm in Lot 14. Dobie was also the director of a dairy company. He was defeated when he ran for reelection to the provincial assembly in 1915. He and his family moved to Fredericton, NB in 1923 where he operated a dairy farm until 1946. He sold most of his Fredericton farm to the federal government for the construction of housing for veterans of World War II. That portion of the city is still referred to as "The Dobie" and the type of houses built there are referred to as "Dobie Houses" throughout New Brunswick.
