= Sylvain Gallant =

Canadian politician

Assemblyman for 1st Prince
- In office 1912–1915
- Preceded by: Benjamin Gallant
- Succeeded by: Benjamin Gallant

Personal details
- Born: Sylvain Thomas Gallant; October 10, 1866 Bloomfield, Colony of Prince Edward Island
- Died: January 13, 1960 (aged 93)
- Party: Conservative

Sylvain Thomas Gallant (October 10, 1866 – January 13, 1960) was a Canadian politician, who represented the electoral district of 1st Prince in the Legislative Assembly of Prince Edward Island from 1912 to 1915. He was a member of the Conservative Party.

After his term in the legislature, Gallant served as Prince Edward Island's chief fisheries inspector from 1919 to 1936.

Some biographical sources may also have incorrectly given the name of Stephen Gallant, the MLA for 3rd Prince from 1895 to 1897, as Sylvain.
