= J. Edward Wyatt =

Canadian politician

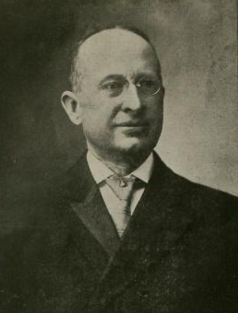
James Edward "Ned" Wyatt

James Edward "Ned" Wyatt (September 24, 1860 – May 4, 1932) was a lawyer and political figure on Prince Edward Island. He represented 5th Prince in the Legislative Assembly of Prince Edward Island from 1908 to 1915 as a Conservative.

He was born in Charlottetown, Prince Edward Island, the son of William Wyatt, and was educated at Prince of Wales College. He married Cecilia, the daughter of John Lefurgey. Wyatt studied law, was admitted to the bar in 1883 and set up practice in Summerside with his brother-in-law J.E. Lefurgey. He was defeated when he ran for a seat in the provincial assembly in 1904 but was successful in the elections of 1908 and 1912. Wyatt was defeated when he ran for reelection in 1915 and in a 1922 by-election. He also was an unsuccessful candidate for a seat in the House of Commons in 1926.

His daughter Wanda was the first female law student in the province. Her father supported a bill in the legislature to allow women to study law and sponsored her application to law school.
