= John Richards (Canadian politician) =

Canadian politician

John Richards (October 4, 1857 – March 8, 1917) was a farmer and political figure on Prince Edward Island. He represented 2nd Prince in the Legislative Assembly of Prince Edward Island from 1908 to 1915 as a Liberal.

He was born in Port Hill, Prince Edward Island, the son of Captain William Richards and Susan Yeo, and was educated at Saint Dunstan's College and King's College. In 1884, Richards married Alice Broad. He served in the province's Executive Council as provincial secretary and Commissioner of Agriculture. Richards was leader of the opposition from 1912 to 1915. He died during a visit to Los Angeles, California at the age of 59.

His brother James William Richards also served in the provincial assembly and sat in the House of Commons.
