= Southport, Prince Edward Island =

Southport
- Interactive map of Southport
- Coordinates: 46°13′35″N 63°6′20″W
- Country: Canada
- Province: Prince Edward Island
- County: Queens
- Town: Stratford

Southport is a community in Queens County, Prince Edward Island, Canada. Since April 1, 1995, when the Charlottetown Area Municipalities Act came into effect and created the town of Stratford, Southport has been part of Stratford.

Federal census population history of Southport
| Year | Pop. | ±% |
|---|---|---|
| 1971 | 365 | — |
| 1976 | 1,009 | +176.4% |
| 1981 | 1,313 | +30.1% |
| 1986 | 1,321 | +0.6% |
| 1991 | 1,665 | +26.0% |
Source: Statistics Canada

== Notable residents ==
- Betty Jean Brown, registered nurse and political figure
- George F. Dewar, physician and political figure
