= List of shipwrecks in 1963 =

The list of shipwrecks in 1963 includes all ships sunk, foundered, grounded, or otherwise lost during 1963.

table of contents
1963
Jan	Feb	Mar	Apr
May	Jun	Jul	Aug
Sep	Oct	Nov	Dec
Unknown date

== January ==
=== 8 January ===
List of shipwrecks: 8 January 1963
Ship	State	Description
Nueva Guinea	Spain	The coaster exploded and sank off Santa Cruz de la Palma, Canary Islands. One crewmember was reported missing and two were injured.

=== 12 January ===
List of shipwrecks: 12 January 1963
Ship	State	Description
Marnipo	Lebanon	The Liberty ship ran aground in the Dardanelles and broke in two. She was on a voyage from Constanţa, Romania to Alexandria, Egypt.

=== 13 January ===
List of shipwrecks: 13 January 1963
Ship	State	Description
Stranger	United States	The 16-gross register ton, 38.3-foot (11.7 m) fishing vessel was destroyed by a storm at Shearwater Bay (57°20′N 152°55′W) on the southeast coast of Kodiak Island.

=== 20 January ===
List of shipwrecks: 20 January 1963
Ship	State	Description
Adelfotis II	Lebanon	The cargo ship was driven ashore at South Shields, County Durham, United Kingdom. All 23 crew were rescued by breeches buoy.
Orizia	Italy	The Liberty ship was driven ashore at Veracruz, Mexico and was abandoned by her crew. She was declared a constructive total loss.

=== 23 January ===
List of shipwrecks: 23 January 1963
Ship	State	Description
Coalinga Hills	United States	The T2 tanker ran aground off Tanegashima, Japan. She was on a voyage from Iran to Kudamatsu. Consequently scrapped due to damage sustained.

=== 25 January ===
List of shipwrecks: 25 January 1963
Ship	State	Description
Nicolaos Tsavliris	Greece	The Liberty ship ran aground off Kilyos, Turkey. She was on a voyage from Bourgas, Bulgaria to Kilyos. She was refloated, but ran aground again. Sold and scrapped in situ.

=== 24 January ===
List of shipwrecks: 24 January 1963
Ship	State	Description
Graziella	Italy	The cargo ship was driven ashore in a gale at Tangier, Morocco.

=== 31 January ===
List of shipwrecks: 31 January 1963
Ship	State	Description
Crescence	United Kingdom	The cargo ship ran aground at Winterton, Norfolk.

== February ==
=== 3 February ===
List of shipwrecks: 3 February 1963
Ship	State	Description
Bridgehampton	United States	The bulk carrier, a converted T2 tanker, caught fire in the Atlantic Ocean 1,000 nautical miles (1,900 km) north east of Bermuda. She was on a voyage from Halifax, Nova Scotia, Canada to Port Said, Egypt. She completed her voyage and was abandoned by her crew on arrival on 23 February.

=== 4 February ===
List of shipwrecks: 4 February 1963
Ship	State	Description
Marine Sulphur Queen	United States	The T2 tanker vanished off the southern coast of Florida after a routine radio report on this date. All 39 crew members were lost. She was on a voyage from Beaumont, Texas to Norfolk, Virginia.

=== 6 February ===
List of shipwrecks: 6 February 1963
Ship	State	Description
Achroite	United Kingdom	The 133.2-foot (40.6 m), 314-ton trawler broke loose from her moorings and was driven ashore on Rosslare Strand 5 miles (8.0 km) northeast or northwest of Rosslare Lighthouse. In a storm on 10–11 February she was driven further ashore and down the beach ending up 2 miles (3.2 km) north of Rosslare Harbour and was stripped and abandoned. Her wreck was dispersed with explosives sometime in 1986–1987.
Johan Collett	Norway	The cargo ship en route from Sardinia to Ghent with a cargo of zinc ore sank after the cargo shifted in a force 10 gale. Nine men were saved by the Guernsey Royal National Lifeboat Institution lifeboat, earning their gold medal and also one from the Norwegian Lifeboat Institution.

=== 7 February ===
List of shipwrecks: 7 February 1963
Ship	State	Description
Barracuda	United States	With two men and a woman aboard, the 10-gross register ton, 36-foot (11.0 m) fishing vessel was wrecked at Split Rock (57°55′30″N 152°29′50″W) near Ouzinkie, Alaska. One of the men and the woman were washed overboard and drowned; the captain was the sole survivor.

=== 11 February ===
List of shipwrecks: 11 February 1963
Ship	State	Description
Flaksee	West Germany	The cargo ship collided with Canuck Trader (Canada) near the Varne Lightvessel ( Trinity House) and sank 9 nautical miles (17 km) off Folkestone, Kent.

=== 15 February ===
List of shipwrecks: 15 February 1963
Ship	State	Description
Maasdam	Netherlands	The ocean liner struck the wreck of Harborough (United Kingdom) at Bremen, West Germany and was holed. All 230 passengers and 276 crew rescued by Gotthilf Hagen (West Germany).

=== 25 February ===
List of shipwrecks: 25 February 1963
Ship	State	Description
Aagtedyk	Netherlands	The Victory ship collided with the cargo ship Citos (Sweden) in the Elbe and was severely damaged. She was towed in to Hamburg, West Germany where she was declared uneconomic to repair and sold for scrapping.
Egli	Greece	The cargo ship sank in the Aegean Sea with the loss of all but one of her 22 crew. She was on a voyage from Salonica to Alexandria, Egypt.
Miraflores	Panama	The tanker collided with Abadesa in the Westerschelde, Netherlands. Both tankers caught fire. One crew and five reported missing from Miraflores. The tanker George Livanos (Panama) ran aground when taking avoiding action.
Unnamed ferry	Japan	The ferry collided with a cargo ship (Japan) off Kobe and sank. Of the 64 people on board, nineteen were rescued, seven killed and 38 were reported missing.

=== 28 February ===
List of shipwrecks: 28 February 1963
Ship	State	Description
Ilektra	Greece	The cargo ship ran aground on the Corncarhai Rock off Brest, France and sank. Sixteen crew took refuge on the rock and were rescued by helicopter. The captain was killed and two crew reported missing.

== March ==
=== 11 March ===
List of shipwrecks: 11 March 1963
Ship	State	Description
Master Elias	Liberia	The Liberty ship ran aground on Buritas Island, Philippines (12°49′N 123°17′E) whilst on a voyage from a Japanese port to Manila, Philippines. She was refloated on 15 March and towed in to Manila in a damaged condition. Consequently scrapped in 1965.

=== 13 March ===
List of shipwrecks: 13 March 1963
Ship	State	Description
Aghios Ioannis	Greece	The Liberty ship ran aground at Ōhara, Japan and broke in two.

=== 15 March ===
List of shipwrecks: 15 March 1963
Ship	State	Description
Mist	United States	The 20-gross register ton, 41.8-foot (12.7 m) fishing vessel sank off Spruce Island in the Kodiak Archipelago near Kodiak, Alaska.

=== 18 March ===
List of shipwrecks: 18 March 1963
Ship	State	Description
Agios Nektarios	Greece	The Empire F type coaster caught fire in the Ionian Sea and was abandoned by her crew. She was on a voyage from Patras to Trieste, Italy. She was taken in tow by Lastovo (Yugoslavia) but sank off Patras.
Protoklidos	Lebanon	The Liberty ship ran aground on the Portuguese coast. Subsequently refloated but sank in the Atlantic Ocean on 20 March north of Cabo Roca.

=== 19 March ===
List of shipwrecks: 19 March 1963
Ship	State	Description
Arctic Bear	Canada	Under tow by the tug Irving Birch (United States) from Mahone Bay, Nova Scotia, Canada, to Philadelphia, Pennsylvania, for use as a museum ship and floating seafood restaurant, the steamer – a former United States Coast Guard cutter – parted her towline in a gale. The storm collapsed her foremast, which punctured her hull, and she foundered in the North Atlantic Ocean about 100 nautical miles (185 km) east of Cape Sable Island, Nova Scotia, and about 260 nautical miles (482 km) east of Boston, Massachusetts, at 42°40′N 065°11′W. Irving Birch rescued her two-man crew.

=== 20 March ===
List of shipwrecks: 20 March 1963
Ship	State	Description
Alkimos	Greece	The Liberty ship ran aground on the Australian coast 170 nautical miles (310 km) north of Fremantle. Refloated in January 1964.
Bear	United States	The barquentine sank 250 nautical miles (460 km) south of Nova Scotia, Canada after losing her tow. Both crew rescued.

=== 24 March ===
List of shipwrecks: 24 March 1963
Ship	State	Description
Northgate	United Kingdom	The cargo ship sank off Le Havre, France. All eight crew rescued by the Le Havre pilot boat.

=== 27 March ===
List of shipwrecks: 27 March 1963
Ship	State	Description
USS Bray	United States Navy	The decommissioned Rudderow-class destroyer escort was sunk as a target.
HDMS Tranen	Royal Danish Navy	The fast patrol boat collided with HNoMS Trygg (Royal Norwegian Navy) and sank off Stavanger, Norway. Her crew were rescued. She was later salvaged and scrapped.

=== 28 March ===
List of shipwrecks: 28 March 1963
Ship	State	Description
Valor	Panama	The cargo ship ran aground at Mukho, South Korea and was declared a constructive total loss.

=== Unknown date ===
List of shipwrecks: Unknown date March 1963
Ship	State	Description
Alkimos	Greece	The cargo ship ran aground on a reef in the Indian Ocean off the coast of Western Australia. She later was refloated and repaired.

== April ==
=== 1 April ===
List of shipwrecks: 1 April 1963
Ship	State	Description
Bulwark	South Africa	Ran aground at Danger Point, Cape Province and broke in two. A total loss.

=== 10 April ===
List of shipwrecks: 10 April 1963
Ship	State	Description
USS Thresher	United States Navy	The Thresher-class submarine broke up and sank with the loss of all 129 crew during deep diving tests in the Atlantic Ocean 190 nautical miles (350 km) east of Cape Cod, Massachusetts.

=== 12 April ===
List of shipwrecks: 12 April 1963
Ship	State	Description
K-33	Soviet Navy	The Hotel II-class ballistic missile submarine collided with the cargo ship MS Finnclipper (Finland) in the Kattegat. She was repaired and returned to service.

=== 16 April ===
List of shipwrecks: 16 April 1963
Ship	State	Description
Arctic Sealer	United Kingdom	The sealing ship sank off Newfoundland, Canada. All crew rescued by Arctic Endeavour (United Kingdom).

=== 21 April ===
List of shipwrecks: 21 April 1963
Ship	State	Description
Bernières	France	The Liberty ship ran aground at Abidjan, Ivory Coast. She was declared a constructive total loss and later scrapped.

=== 23 April ===
List of shipwrecks: 23 April 1963
Ship	State	Description
Petronap	Panama	The former depot ship caught fire and wrecked on San Lorenzo Island, near Callao, Peru.

=== 24 April ===
List of shipwrecks: 24 April 1963
Ship	State	Description
Cato	United Kingdom	The coaster was cut in two and sank at Avonmouth, Somerset when a mooring rope from City of Brooklyn (United States) broke. Later raised and scrapped.

=== 26 April ===
List of shipwrecks: 26 April 1963
Ship	State	Description
Marine Progress	United States	The Liberty ship was driven ashore on the coast of Puerto Rico. She was refloated but declared a constructive total loss and scrapped.

=== 27 April ===
List of shipwrecks: 27 April 1963
Ship	State	Description
Capri	United States	The T3 tanker ran aground on the Molasses Reef, Florida (25°07′N 80°22′W). She was on a voyage from Providence, Rhode Island to Smiths Bluff, Texas. She was refloated and towed in to Tampa, Florida. She was consequently scrapped.

=== 28 April ===
List of shipwrecks: 28 April 1963
Ship	State	Description
Vivian	United States	The Victory ship lost her propeller 450 nautical miles (830 km) off Penang, Federation of Malaya. She was on a voyage from Chittagong, East Pakistan to Yokohama, Japan. She was towed in to Singapore where she was declared a constructive total loss.

=== 29 April ===
List of shipwrecks: 29 April 1963
Ship	State	Description
Cosmonaut	Soviet Union	The cargo ship ran aground off Copenhagen, Denmark on her maiden voyage and was holed.
Thor	United States	The 59-gross register ton, 59.9-foot (18.3 m) fishing vessel sank in Behm Canal in the Alexander Archipelago in Southeast Alaska.

=== 30 April ===
List of shipwrecks: 30 April 1963
Ship	State	Description
Aghios Georgios II	Lebanon	The cargo ship caught fire off Eastbourne, Sussex, United Kingdom. The crew were taken off by the Eastbourne Lifeboat Beryl Tollemache ( Royal National Lifeboat Institution) and the ship was beached at Norman's Bay.

=== Unknown date ===
List of shipwrecks: Unknown date March 1963
Ship	State	Description
Arosa Sun	Italy	The accommodation ship was damaged by fire near IJmuiden, North Holland, Netherlands.
Djebel Aures	Algerian National Navy	The BYMS-class coastal minesweeper was wrecked off Algiers, Algeria.

== May ==
=== 1 May ===
List of shipwrecks: 1 May 1963
Ship	State	Description
Transcaribbean	United States	The Victory ship ran aground on Cabras Island, off San Juan, Puerto Rico. She was on a voyage from New York to Bermuda. Salvage was abandoned after further damage by weather and she was declared a constructive total loss.
Yue Jin	China	The cargo ship struck a rock, and sank off Cheju Island, South Korea. All 55 crew rescued by the fishing boat Iki-maru (Japan).

=== 4 May ===
List of shipwrecks: 5 May 1963
Ship	State	Description
Adel	Egypt	The ferry capsized and sank in the Nile near Karara in Sudan with the loss of 173 lives.

=== 5 May ===
List of shipwrecks: 5 May 1963
Ship	State	Description
Adel	Egypt	The ferry capsized and sank in the Nile near Karara in Sudan with the loss of 173 lives.
Anna Demetrios	Liberia	The T2 tanker was disabled off Jamaica (18°44′N 79°49′W) when her turbine exploded. She was on a voyage from Aruba, Netherlands Antilles to New Orleans, Louisiana, United States. She was towed in to Kingston, Jamaica the next day. Declared a constructive total loss, she was consequently scrapped.

=== 8 May ===
List of shipwrecks: 8 May 1963
Ship	State	Description
Pinta	Netherlands	Carrying a cargo of teak lumber from Central America to New York City, the 194-foot (59.1 m), 1,000-deadweight ton motor cargo ship sank in the North Atlantic Ocean 8 nautical miles (15 km; 9.2 mi) east-northeast of Shark River Inlet, New Jersey, in 85 feet (26 m) of water at 40°13.827′N 073°50.625′W 48 minutes after colliding with the steam cargo ship City of Perth (United Kingdom). City of Perth rescued her entire crew of 12.
Saint Louis	United States	The 18-gross register ton, 41.6-foot (12.7 m) motor vessel was destroyed by fire at Juneau, Alaska.

=== 20 May ===
List of shipwrecks: 20 May 1963
Ship	State	Description
Bruce M	Lebanon	The cargo ship collided with Puerto de Castillon (Spain), which sank west of Jersey, Channel Islands. Bruce M rescued the crew of the other ship and made for Plymouth, Devon but started to take on water. Assistance was given by HMS Wakeful (Royal Navy).

=== 22 May ===
List of shipwrecks: 22 May 1963
Ship	State	Description
Mparmpa Petros	Greece	The cargo ship ran aground at Porto de Pedras, Brazil and was wrecked. She was on a voyage from Buenos Aires, Argentina to Naples, Italy.

=== 23 May ===
List of shipwrecks: 22 May 1963
Ship	State	Description
Bridgehampton	United States	The bulk carrier, a converted T2 tanker, caught fire at Port Said, Egypt.

=== 31 May ===
List of shipwrecks: 31 May 1963
Ship	State	Description
Alkimos	Greece	The cargo ship ran aground 30 nautical miles (56 km) north of Perth, Western Australia following the loss of her tow.

=== Unknown date ===
List of shipwrecks: Unknown date 1963
Ship	State	Description
USS Iona	United States Navy	The tug was sunk in an accident. Later raised and scrapped by burning.
Leningrad	Soviet Union	The decommissioned Leningrad-class destroyer sank off the Solovetsky Islands after being used as a target ship.

== June ==
=== 2 June ===
List of shipwrecks: 2 June 1963
Ship	State	Description
Lord Gladstone	United Kingdom	The cargo ship ran aground at Novorossiysk, Soviet Union. Later refloated with aid of Soviet ships.

=== 5 June ===
List of shipwrecks: 5 June 1963
Ship	State	Description
Cascade	United States	The motor vessel sank off Duke Island in the Gravina Islands in the Alexander Archipelago in southeast Alaska.
Seacrest	Liberia	The Liberty ship ran aground near Barcelona, Spain. She was later refloated and towed to Genoa, Italy where she was declared a constructive total loss.

=== 6 June ===
List of shipwrecks: 6 June 1963
Ship	State	Description
Anna D	United States	The 197-gross register ton, 96.8-foot (29.5 m) fishing vessel sank at False Pass, Alaska.

=== 7 June ===
List of shipwrecks: 7 June 1963
Ship	State	Description
Seekonk	Canada	The T1 tanker caught fire while pierside at Charlottetown, Prince Edward Island, Canada, and suffered a series of explosions. She was towed away and grounded on Governors Island in Hillsborough Bay. After the fire burned itself out, she was refloated and scrapped.

=== 8 June ===
List of shipwrecks: 8 June 1963
Ship	State	Description
Sea Rose	United States	The 128-gross register ton, 80.5-foot (24.5 m) fishing vessel was wrecked on a reef at Seal Cape (55°21′45″N 161°18′30″W) in the Shumagin Islands off the Alaska Peninsula.

=== 13 June ===
List of shipwrecks: 13 June 1963
Ship	State	Description
Carmen	Panama	The cargo ship collided with Sadikzade (Turkey) in the Strait of Dover and sank with the loss of two crew. Sadikzade then collided with Leandros (Greece), which in turn collided with Clyde Sergeant (United Kingdom). All three ships reached port safely.
Giannis	Greece	The Liberty ship ran aground 3 nautical miles (5.6 km) off Ohara, Japan (35°10′N 140°23′E). She was on a voyage from San Francisco, California, United States to a Japanese port. She broke in two on 13 July and was a total loss.

=== 17 June ===
List of shipwrecks: 17 June 1963
Ship	State	Description
T. M.	United States	The 6-gross register ton, 28.7-foot (8.7 m) fishing vessel sank in Orca Bay in Prince William Sound on the coast of Alaska.

=== 18 June ===
List of shipwrecks: 18 June 1963
Ship	State	Description
Agios Nektarios	Greece	caught fire in the Ionian Sea, taken in tow but sank near Patras, Greece.

=== 19 June ===
List of shipwrecks: 19 June 1963
Ship	State	Description
Gianni Zeta	Italy	The cargo liner collided with Fosna (Norway) and sank off Gibraltar. All nineteen crew and nine passengers saved.

=== 26 June ===
List of shipwrecks: 26 June 1963
Ship	State	Description
Fleurus	Canada	The circus ship caught fire at Yarmouth, Nova Scotia. All people and animals saved except for some zebras. The wreck was scuttled in October 1963.

=== 27 June ===
List of shipwrecks: 27 June 1963
Ship	State	Description
Tahiti	United States	The 36-gross register ton, 46.5-foot (14.2 m) fishing vessel sank in Raspberry Strait (58°02′N 153°00′W) between Raspberry Island and Afognak near Kodiak, Alaska.

== July ==
=== 1 July ===
List of shipwrecks: 1 July 1963
Ship	State	Description
Elfin II	United States	The motor vessel sank in Sergis Narrows (57°24′20″N 135°38′00″W) in Peril Strait in the Alexander Archipelago in Southeast Alaska.
Pen 14	United States	The motor vessel sank in Bristol Bay off the coast of Alaska.

=== 2 July ===
List of shipwrecks: 2 July 1963
Ship	State	Description
Netty	Netherlands	The coaster collided with Fina Canada (Italy) off Ramsgate, Kent and sank. All five crew rescued by Fina Canada.

=== 4 July ===
List of shipwrecks: 4 July 1963
Ship	State	Description
Erin	United States	The 10-gross register ton, 31-foot (9.4 m) fishing vessel was destroyed by fire at Orca, Alaska (60°39′50″N 145°43′00″W).
Hawk	United States	The 25-gross register ton 45.1-foot (13.7 m) barge sank in Bristol Bay at Naknek, Alaska.

=== 8 July ===
List of shipwrecks: 8 July 1963
Ship	State	Description
Patrician	United Kingdom	The cargo ship collided with Santa Emilia (United States) and sank off Gibraltar. Thirty-four of the 37 crew were rescued by Santa Emilia, with three reported as missing.
Unidentified vessel	Portugal	Guinea-Bissau War of Independence: The vessel was sunk by PAIGC action at the confluence of the Cumbija River and the Cobade River.

=== 9 July ===
List of shipwrecks: 9 July 1963
Ship	State	Description
Dorothy H	United States	The 8-gross register ton, 27-foot (8.2 m) fishing vessel was destroyed by fire at Chignik Lagoon, Alaska.
Hazel	United States	The motor vessel sank in Spasski Bay (58°06′35″N 135°19′00″W) east of Hoonah Alaska.

=== 11 July ===
List of shipwrecks: 11 July 1963
Ship	State	Description
Ciudad de Asuncion	Argentina	The ferry struck the wreck of Marionga J Cairns (flag unknown), caught fire and sank in the River Plate between Buenos Aires and Montevideo, Uruguay. At least 53 of the 420 people on board were killed.
Sandra	United States	The 10-gross register ton, 30-foot (9.1 m) fishing vessel was wrecked off Kalgin Island in Cook Inlet ion the coast of Alaska.

=== 14 July ===
List of shipwrecks: 14 July 1963
Ship	State	Description
Hobart Star	United Kingdom	The cargo ship ran aground at Melbourne, Australia in a storm. Later refloated and returned to service.
Margie Ann	United States	The 12-gross register ton, 33.1-foot (10.1 m) fishing vessel was destroyed by fire at Fresh Water Bay (57°51′N 134°59′W) near Tenakee, Alaska.

=== 15 July ===
List of shipwrecks: 15 July 1963
Ship	State	Description
Bassurelle	France	The trawler was wrecked in the English Channel off Langton Matravers, Dorset, United Kingdom. Her five crew were rescued.
HMS Brave Swordsman	Royal Navy	The Brave-class patrol boat ran aground 10 nautical miles (19 km) off Clacton-on-Sea, Essex. Later refloated and taken to Chatham Dockyard for examination.

=== 17 July ===
List of shipwrecks: 17 July 1963
Ship	State	Description
Sunbeam	United States	The 58-gross register ton, 62.6-foot (19.1 m) fishing vessel was wrecked near Point Gardner (57°01′N 134°37′W) in Southeast Alaska.
Trebisnjica	Yugoslavia	Trebisnjica in July 2010 The Liberty ship ran aground on Hogsty Reef, in the Bahamas (21°36′N 73°50′W).

=== 21 July ===
List of shipwrecks: 21 July 1963
Ship	State	Description
Aronda	United Kingdom	The cargo liner broke free from her tow in a storm. She was being towed from Hong Kong to Kaohsiung, Taiway. She came ashore near Macao. Subsequently refloated and repaired.
Tritonica	Bermuda	The bulk carrier collided with Roonagh Head (United Kingdom) and sank in the St Lawrence River 55 nautical miles (102 km) from Quebec City, Quebec, Canada. Thirty-three crew were killed.

=== 24 July ===
List of shipwrecks: 24 July 1963
Ship	State	Description
Aronda	China	The cargo ship ran aground at Macao after losing her tow in a typhoon whilst being towed to Hong Kong for scrapping.

=== 25 July ===
List of shipwrecks: 25 July 1963
Ship	State	Description
Blikur	Faroe Islands	The coaster struck an iceberg and sank off Greenland. All 35 crew saved by Poseidon (West Germany).

== August ==
=== 1 August ===
List of shipwrecks: 1 August 1963
Ship	State	Description
Meteor	United States	The 83-gross register ton, 75.5-foot (23.0 m) cargo vessel was wrecked at Coal Harbor in Zachary Bay (55°22′N 160°38′W) on the coast of Unga Island in the Shumagin Islands off the south coast of the Alaska Peninsula.

=== 4 August ===
List of shipwrecks: 4 August 1963
Ship	State	Description
Kastela	Yugoslavia	The Liberty ship sank in the Hudson Strait 500 nautical miles (930 km) north north east of Churchill, Manitoba, Canada (63°39′N 77°20′W). She was on a voyage from Churchill to a British port.

=== 7 August ===
List of shipwrecks: 7 August 1963
Ship	State	Description
Venus	United States	The 8-gross register ton 29.8-foot (9.1 m) wooden fishing vessel was destroyed by fire in Ivan Bay (56°00′N 158°50′W) near Chignik, Alaska.

=== 14 August ===
List of shipwrecks: 14 August 1963
Ship	State	Description
Empire Grace	United Kingdom	The refrigerated cargo liner ran aground at Kanholmsfjärden, Sweden. Refloated on 26 August but declared a constructive total loss and consequently scrapped.
USS Queenfish	United States Navy	The decommissioned Balao-class submarine was sunk as a target by the submarine USS Swordfish (United States Navy).

== September ==
=== 2 September ===
List of shipwrecks: 2 September 1963
Ship	State	Description
Eli-Yuk	United States	The 35-gross register ton motor vessel sank in the Arctic Ocean off Point Wainwright (70°38′15″N 160°01′45″W) on the coast of Alaska.

=== 4 September ===
List of shipwrecks: 4 September 1963
Ship	State	Description
Archangelsk	Soviet Union	The cargo ship ran aground in fog in the Bosphorus, ramming a house and killing three people.
Salah El Din	Egypt	The Victory ship was severely damaged by fire at Hamilton, Ontario, Canada. She was subsequently sold and repaired.

=== 6 September ===
List of shipwrecks: 6 September 1963
Ship	State	Description
USS Balao	United States Navy	The decommissioned Balao-class submarine was sunk as a target off the coast of northern Florida.

=== 13 September ===
List of shipwrecks: 13 September 1963
Ship	State	Description
Alacrity	United Kingdom	The coaster ran aground on the Cornish coast between Land's End and St Ives and was holed.

=== 19 September ===
List of shipwrecks: 19 September 1963
Ship	State	Description
Hagemeister	United States	The 69-gross register ton 65.2-foot (19.9 m) motor cargo vessel sank approximately 12 nautical miles (22 km; 14 mi) southeast of Cape Yakataga, Alaska.

=== 21 September ===
List of shipwrecks: 21 September 1963
Ship	State	Description
USS Grouse	United States Navy	The minesweeper was wrecked without loss of life on Little Salvages Shoal off Rockport, Massachusetts. The United States Navy burned her wreck. Its remains settled in up to 20 feet (6.1 m) of water at 42°40′24″N 070°34′29″W.
Memories	United States	The 13-gross register ton, 35.2-foot (10.7 m) fishing vessel was destroyed by fire at Cordova, Alaska.

=== 22 September ===
List of shipwrecks: 22 September 1963
Ship	State	Description
Andes	United Kingdom	The ocean liner ran aground off Sicily, Italy but was refloated after three hours.

=== 23 September ===
List of shipwrecks: 23 September 1963
Ship	State	Description
USS Grouse	United States Navy	The minesweeper was destroyed by explosives after running aground off Rockport, Massachusetts, two days earlier.

=== 24 September ===
List of shipwrecks: 24 September 1963
Ship	State	Description
Roland	West Germany	The coaster collided with Rio Quequen (Argentina) off Warnemünde and sank with the loss of one crewmember, two others reported missing.

=== 25 September ===
List of shipwrecks: 25 September 1963
Ship	State	Description
Apex No. 1	United States	The 19-gross register ton, 42.4-foot (12.9 m) fishing vessel wrecked off the Trinity Islands (56°33′N 154°20′W) in Alaska's Kodiak Archipelago.

=== 27 September ===
List of shipwrecks: 27 September 1963
Ship	State	Description
Bremerton	United States	The motor vessel was destroyed by fire in Kasaan Bay (55°24′N 132°06′W) in Southeast Alaska.

=== Unknown date ===
List of shipwrecks: Unknown date 1963
Ship	State	Description
Spray	United States	The 7-gross register ton, 33.1-foot (10.1 m) fishing vessel was lost at False Pass, Alaska.

== October ==
=== 2 October ===
List of shipwrecks: 2 October 1963
Ship	State	Description
Humbergate	United Kingdom	The coaster capsized and sank off West Pentire, Cornwall. All five crew survived.

=== 8 October ===
List of shipwrecks: 8 October 1963
Ship	State	Description
Manticos	Greece	The Empire Malta-class cargo ship sprang a leak 210 nautical miles (390 km) south of Dakar, Senegal, and was beached. She sank at the stern on 22 October and was declared a total loss.

=== 11 October ===
List of shipwrecks: 11 October 1963
Ship	State	Description
Larch	United States	The 28-gross register ton, 47.3-foot (14.4 m) fishing vessel sank in the Gulf of Alaska off Martin Island (60°10′N 144°36′W) on the south-central coast of Alaska.

=== 13 October ===
List of shipwrecks: 13 October 1963
Ship	State	Description
Jinny C	United States	The 72-gross register ton, 68.2-foot (20.8 m) fishing vessel was wrecked in Crescent Bay (52°02′15″N 175°14′00″W) on the north coast of Atka Island in the Aleutian Islands.

=== 14 October ===
List of shipwrecks: 14 October 1963
Ship	State	Description
Island Cypress	Canada	The barge broke in two and sank off the mouth of the Quillayute River.

=== 21 October ===
List of shipwrecks: 21 October 1963
Ship	State	Description
Bharatveer	India	The cargo ship was driven ashore 5 nautical miles (9.3 km) north of Madras in a typhoon. She was on a voyage from Calcutta to Cuddalore. She caught fire on 23 October and was declared a constructive total loss.

=== 22 October ===
List of shipwrecks: 22 October 1963
Ship	State	Description
Island Maple	Canada	The barge broke in two off Cape Flattery. The bow section sank, the stern section capsized and was scuttled.
Manticos	Greece	Sank after pumping operation failed and leak increased.

=== 23 October ===
List of shipwrecks: 23 October 1963
Ship	State	Description
Juan Ferrer	Spain	Capsized and sank near Boscawen Point, United Kingdom, with the loss of eleven of the fifteen crew.
Northern Spray	United Kingdom	The 188.1-foot (57.3 m), 620-ton trawler went aground in a storm at Graenahlid, Iceland 3 miles (4.8 km) inside the tip of Ritur Huk. The vessel was declared a total loss after three salvage attempts failed. The crew were taken off by ICGV Óðinn (Icelandic Coast Guard)

=== 24 October ===
List of shipwrecks: 24 October 1963
Ship	State	Description
Theokotos	Panama	The Liberty ship collided with British Statesman (United Kingdom) off Lisbon, Portugal. She was declared a constructive total loss.

=== 26 October ===
List of shipwrecks: 26 October 1963
Ship	State	Description
Hai Fu	Taiwan	The Victory ship ran aground at Honolulu, Hawaii, United States. She was on a voyage from Houston, Texas, United States to Kaohsiung. She was later refloated and towed in to Honolulu, where she was declared a constructive total loss. She was consequently scrapped.

=== 27 October ===
List of shipwrecks: 27 October 1963
Ship	State	Description
Actuality	United Kingdom	The coaster collided with Betty Anne-S (Netherlands) and sank in the English Channel 4 nautical miles (7.4 km) off Hastings, Sussex. Actuality was on a voyage from Amble, Northumberland to Yelland, Devon.

== November ==
=== 1 November ===
List of shipwrecks: 1 November 1963
Ship	State	Description
Unidentified barge	United States	Carrying a crane, a 90-foot (27.4 m) barge sank while under tow off the coast of Massachusetts in Nantucket Sound southeast of Cross Rip at 41°26′03″N 070°13′28″W.

=== 2 November ===
List of shipwrecks: 2 November 1963
Ship	State	Description
Irene	United States	The 8-gross register ton, 26.3-foot (8.0 m) fishing vessel sank in Tongass Narrows in Southeast Alaska near Ketchikan, Alaska.

=== 7 November ===
List of shipwrecks: 7 November 1963
Ship	State	Description
Lord Stanhope	United Kingdom	The 157.3-foot (47.9 m), 448-ton trawler stranded 4 miles (6.4 km) west of Ingolfshofdi Lighthouse, Iceland (63°48′N 16°40′W) in heavy swells and Force 7 winds. Later declared a total loss. All 18 crew made it to shore.

=== 13 November ===
List of shipwrecks: 13 November 1963
Ship	State	Description
Woodburn	United Kingdom	The cargo ship ran aground off Singapore and was holed.

=== 14 November ===
List of shipwrecks: 14 November 1963
Ship	State	Description
Dynafuel	United States	The T1 tanker collided with Fernview (Norway) at Buzzard's Bay, Massachusetts. Dynafuel caught fire. She was on a voyage from Newington, New Hampshire to Newark, New Jersey. She sank on 15 November after the two ships were separated. The crews of both vessels were rescued by the United States Coast Guard. Dynafuel was declared a constructive total loss and abandoned to the United States Army Corps of Engineers for disposal.

=== 17 November ===
List of shipwrecks: 17 November 1963
Ship	State	Description
William H. McAllister	United States	The 80-foot (24 m), 140-gross register ton tug struck Schuyler Reef in Lake Champlain off Burlington, Vermont, and sank in deep water without loss of life.

=== 19 November ===
List of shipwrecks: 19 November 1963
Ship	State	Description
Bertie II	United States	The 12-gross register ton, 36.3-foot (11.1 m) fishing vessel was destroyed by fire at Tenakee Springs, Alaska.

=== 26 November ===
List of shipwrecks: 26 November 1963
Ship	State	Description
Westland Producer	United Kingdom	The ship collided with Urania (Panama) and sank off Sheerness, Kent. One of her seven crew was reported missing.

=== Unknown date ===
List of shipwrecks: Unknown date 1963
Ship	State	Description
Dentist	United States	The 274-gross register ton, 80-foot (24.4 m) barge was destroyed by fire at Nakwasina (57°12′N 135°24′W), Alaska, 20 nautical miles (37 km; 23 mi) north of Sitka.
Kilo	Netherlands	The cargo ship caught fire in the Bristol Channel. Her crew were rescued by the Mumbles Lifeboat.

== December ==
=== 3 December ===
List of shipwrecks: 3 December 1963
Ship	State	Description
Roumeli	Lebanon	The Ocean ship ran aground at Gijón, Spain. Later refloated and consequently scrapped.

=== 8 December ===
List of shipwrecks: 8 December 1963
Ship	State	Description
Fort Albany	Canada	Collided with ship in Saint Lawrence River and sank near Sorel, Quebec, Canada
Margaret Wicks	United Kingdom	The 136.9-foot (41.7 m), 366-ton trawler stranded on rocks in the Mull of Oa, Isley. Her crew was rescued. She was pulled off by R.F.A. Dispencer (Royal Fleet Auxiliary) on 15 December. Later declared a Constructive Total Loss and scrapped.

=== 13 December ===
List of shipwrecks: 13 December 1963
Ship	State	Description
"Loch Lorgan"	United Kingdom	The 88-foot (27 m) trawler ran aground on Middle Caister Shoal, she refloated at high tide and was driven ashore on North Beach, Yarmouth. Salvaged and returned to service.

=== 14 December ===
List of shipwrecks: 14 December 1963
Ship	State	Description
Castillo Montjuich	Spain	The vessel was last reported in the North Atlantic Ocean 400 nautical miles (740 km) northwest of the Azores (43°12′N 34°20′W).

=== 18 December ===
List of shipwrecks: 18 December 1963
Ship	State	Description
Wesco No. 1	United States	The 17-gross register ton, 35-foot (11 m) fishing vessel foundered in Prince William Sound off Perry Island, Alaska.

=== 20 December ===
List of shipwrecks: 20 December 1963
Ship	State	Description
Mary Pauline	Canada	The coaster foundered off St. John's, Newfoundland with the loss of six of her seven crew.

=== 21 December ===
List of shipwrecks: 21 December 1963
Ship	State	Description
Douala	France	The coaster foundered off Point-aux-Basques, Newfoundland with the loss of at least seven crew.

=== 22 December ===
List of shipwrecks: 22 December 1963
Ship	State	Description
Lakonia	Greece	The 20,314-ton passenger liner caught fire in the Atlantic Ocean while sailing to the island of Madeira and was disabled; 128 fatalities.

=== 23 December ===
List of shipwrecks: 23 December 1963
Ship	State	Description
LT-85	Cuban Revolutionary Navy	The Project 123K-class motor torpedo boat was sunk in Siguanea harbor by a Limpet mine. 3 crewmen killed, 18 wounded.

=== 24 December ===
List of shipwrecks: 24 December 1963
Ship	State	Description
Amazon	Greece	The Liberty ship ran aground near Cape Bon, Tunisia (36°43′N 10°58′E). She was later refloated but declared a constructive total loss and scrapped.

=== 25 December ===
List of shipwrecks: 25 December 1963
Ship	State	Description
Mohammedi	India	The ocean liner ran aground 14 nautical miles (26 km) south of Singapore. HMS Barbain (Royal Navy) attempted to go to her aid but was ordered out of Indonesian territorial waters by Indonesian Navy gunboats. Her clearance to enter Indonesian waters not being accepted, she withdrew to international waters.

=== 29 December ===
List of shipwrecks: 29 December 1963
Ship	State	Description
Lakonia	Greece	After being disabled by a fire on 22 December, the abandoned 20,314-ton passenger liner sank in the Atlantic Ocean 230 nautical miles (430 km) southwest of Lisbon, Portugal, and 250 nautical miles (460 km) west of Gibraltar while under tow.

=== 30 December ===
List of shipwrecks: 30 December 1963
Ship	State	Description
Totsy	United States	The 17-gross register ton, 42-foot (13 m) fishing vessel was wrecked at Waterfall in Southeast Alaska.
Jinamho No.2	South Korea	Jinamho No.2 (제2지남호), a 102-ton fishing vessel, was sunk by rogue wave while fishing tuna in Samoan waters. Out of its 23 crew members, only 2 survived by swimming to Rakahanga, Cook Islands.

=== 31 December ===
List of shipwrecks: 31 December 1963
Ship	State	Description
Challenger	United States	The 13-gross register ton, 34.9-foot (10.6 m) fishing vessel sank off Seldovia, Alaska.

== Unknown date ==
List of shipwrecks: Unknown date 1963
Ship	State	Description
Dunay	Soviet Navy	The full-rigged ship was destroyed by fire.
John W. Cullen	United States	The Liberty ship was driven ashore near Jamaica Beach, Texas between 26 January and 6 February. She was being towed from Beaumont, Texas to New Orleans, Louisiana for scrapping. She was refloated on 14 February and the voyage was resumed.
USAT Liberty	United States	The United States Army Transport, aground at Tulamben, Bali, Indonesia, since being torpedoed during World War II by the submarine I-166 (Imperial Japanese Navy) on 11 February 1942, slipped off the beach due to seismic tremors associated with the volcanic eruption of Mount Agung and sank.
Rande A	United States	The cattle transport was wrecked on Chirikof Island in the Gulf of Alaska.
Unidentified barge	United States	The barge became hung up on the wreck of the cattle transport Rande A (United States) on Chirikof Island in the Gulf of Alaska shortly after Rande A came ashore. The barge also was wrecked.

== Sources ==
- Sawyer, L. A.; Mitchell, W. H. (1974). Victory Ships and Tankers. Newton Abbot: David and Charles. ISBN 0 7153 6036 1.
- Sawyer, L. A.; Mitchell, W. H. (1985). The Liberty Ships (Second ed.). London: Lloyd's of London Press Ltd. ISBN 1-85044-049-2.
