= USS Seekonk =

History

United States
- Name: USS Seekonk
- Namesake: Seekonk River in Rhode Island
- Ordered: as SS Summit Springe; T1-M-A2 tanker hull, MC hull 902
- Laid down: 1943
- Launched: 24 May 1943
- Commissioned: 10 February 1944
- Decommissioned: 1 May 1946
- Stricken: 21 May 1946
- Fate: Scrapped in Buctouche, New Brunswick, Canada in 1963

General characteristics
- Tonnage: 1,228 long tons deadweight (DWT)
- Displacement: 846 short tons (755 LT) (net), 2,270 short tons (2,030 LT)
- Length: 220 feet 6 inches (67.21 m)
- Beam: 37 feet (11 m)
- Draught: 17 feet (5.2 m)
- Propulsion: Diesel direct drive, single screw, 720 hp
- Speed: 10 knots (19 km/h)
- Complement: 62
- Armament: one single 3 in (76 mm) dual purpose gun mount, two 40 mm guns, three single 20 mm gun mounts

USS Seekonk (AOG-20) was a Mettawee-class gasoline tanker acquired by the U.S. Navy for the dangerous task of transporting gasoline to warships in the fleet, and to remote Navy stations.

Seekonk was built in 1943 as Summit Springe (MC hull 902) under a Maritime Commission contract by the Marine Maintenance Corp., now East Coast Shipyards, Inc., Bayonne, New Jersey, launched on 24 May 1943 sponsored by Miss Gladys G. Merrick; and commissioned on 10 February 1944.

== World War II service ==
Seekonk was the fourth of a group of small, single screw, engine-aft, diesel propelled tankers accepted by the Navy during World War II. After fitting out at Staten Island, New York; shakedown training in Chesapeake Bay; and post-shakedown availability at the Norfolk Navy Yard, Seekonk got underway in convoy on 22 March 1944 for Aruba, Netherlands West Indies. Putting into Nicolas Bay, Aruba, on 1 April, Seekonk loaded cargo, fuel, and aviation gasoline and departed the next day for the Panama Canal Zone. On 10 April, the gasoline tanker departed Balboa for New Guinea, arriving at Finschaven on 1 June.

=== South Pacific operations ===
For the remainder of 1944, Seekonk operated off the coast of New Guinea, visiting such ports as Madang, Hollandia, Sansapor, Mios Woendi, Biak, and Morotai. On 31 October, aided by harbor guns, the small oiler fought off four attacking Japanese planes off Soemoe Island, Morotai, Netherlands East Indies, and splashed two and possibly three of the attackers.

=== Serving Philippine invasion forces ===
From 7 January to 14 February 1945, Seekonk fueled a large share of the amphibious ships used in liberating Luzon and other islands of the Philippines. On the 18th, the gasoline tanker, towing Army crash boat, N6-1, took her position in convoy GI 11-(A) en route to Leyte, Philippines, and arrived at San Pedro Bay on 4 March.

=== End-of-war activity ===
Seekonk operated in the Philippine area until the cessation of hostilities in August. During this period the ship served as harbor oiler at Mindoro Island, Subic Bay, and Lingayen. From 28 August to 9 October, the ship fueled Task Group 71.2 as it was engaged in sweeping Allied and Japanese-laid mines from the approaches to Shanghai.

== Post-war operations ==
On 10 October, Seekonk got underway with Task Group 73.14, assigned to clear the mines in Haiphong Harbor, French Indochina, and in the Hainan Strait. From 12 October, Seekonk had to be towed by Frament (DE-677) due to a piston seizure in her main engine. On the 20th, she anchored off Doson Peninsula, Tonkin Gulf. Continuing the fueling of the task group, Seekonk was towed to the Norway Islands, Tonkin Gulf, on 24 October, and to Hainan on the 29th. On 2 November the gasoline tanker was towed to Han Dau Island, using her own engine part of the time. On 11 November, she got underway with Task Group 74.4 for Hong Kong. Towed part of the way, Seekonk arrived there on 15 November.

== Continued engine problems ==
On 21 December, her main engine repaired, Seekonk departed Hong Kong en route to Pearl Harbor. On 26 December, however, her main engine was again disabled, and she limped toward Okinawa, assisted into Buckner Bay by Cahuilla (ATF-152) on the 29th.

== Post-war decommissioning ==
Seekonk reached San Francisco, California, on 26 February 1946. She was decommissioned and stripped on 1 May 1946 and struck from the Navy list on 21 May 1946. The small oiler was turned over to the Maritime Commission as a usable vessel on 28 August 1946. Seekonk was fitted out and sold as a merchant vessel by the Maritime Commission.

Seekonk was purchased on 28 January 1949 by Newfoundland Tankers Ltd., a subsidiary of Irving Oil. Under Irving ownership, the name was unchanged, and Seekonk sailed to eastern Canada where she worked in the Great Lakes on charter to British-American Oil Company for several seasons beginning in 1951. She later saw service for Irving Oil to ports in the Maritimes and Newfoundland and Labrador.

On 7 June 1963 a fire broke out in the galley while Seekonk was in Charlottetown, Prince Edward Island, Canada. Following several explosions, the fire spread throughout the aft end of the vessel, consuming the bridge, accommodations and engine room. The burning ship was towed from the pier by the Canadian Coast Guard's CCGS Tupper and was removed from the harbour; the Seekonk was beached on Governors Island in Hillsborough Bay where the fire burned out after two days. After the fire was out, Seekonk was towed to an Irving Oil dock in Buctouche, New Brunswick, Canada and later to Sydney Nova Scotia where she was broken up.

== Military awards and honors ==
The U.S. Navy record does not indicate whether Seekonk was awarded battle stars. However, her crew was eligible for the following:

- Combat Action Ribbon (retroactive)
- China Service Medal (extended)
- American Campaign Medal
- Asiatic-Pacific Campaign Medal
- World War II Victory Medal
- Navy Occupation Service Medal (with Asia clasp)
- Philippines Liberation Medal
