= SS Mparmpa Petros =

1943 cargo ship

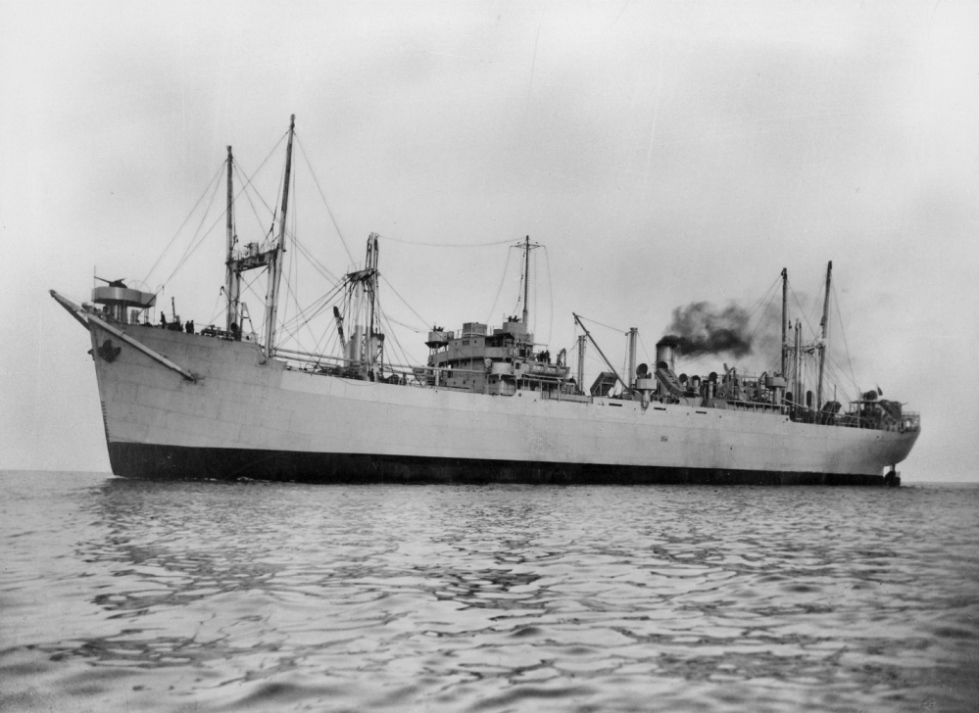
- Empire Crown

History
- Name: Empire Crown (1943–45); Capitaine G Lacoley (1945–61); Mparmpa Petros (1961–63)
- Owner: Ministry of War Transport (1943–45); Ministry of Transport (1945–46); French Government (1946–61); Mparmpapetros Shipping Co SA (1961–63)
- Operator: J & C Harrison (1944–46); Armement Chastellain (1946–61); Pateras Shipbrokers Ltd (1961–63)
- Port of registry: (United Kingdom) South Shields (1943–45); France (1945–61); Greece (1961–64)
- Builder: John Readhead & Sons Ltd
- Yard number: 537
- Launched: 16 October 1943
- Completed: January 1944
- Maiden voyage: 4 January 1944
- Out of service: 22 May 1963
- Identification: United Kingdom Official Number 169054 (1943–45); Code Letters GBPX (1943–45)
- Fate: Wrecked

General characteristics
- Type: Cargo ship
- Tonnage: 7,067 GRT; 10,280 DWT
- Length: 431 ft (131 m)
- Beam: 56 ft (17 m)
- Propulsion: Triple expansion steam engine, single screw propeller

Mparmpa Petros was a 7,067 GRT cargo ship that was built in 1943 as Empire Crown by John Readhead & Sons Ltd, Sunderland, County Durham. She spent much of the Second World War sailing in the Mediterranean. In 1945, she was transferred to the French Government and renamed Capitaine G Lacoley. She served until sold to Greece in 1961 and was renamed Mparmpa Petros. She was wrecked in 1963.

== Description ==
The ship was built in 1943 by John Readhead & Sons Ltd, Sunderland. She was Yard Number 537.

The ship was 431 feet (131 m) long, with a beam of 56 feet (17 m). She was assessed at 7,067 GRT. Her DWT was 10,280. The ship was propelled by a triple expansion steam engine.

== History ==
=== War service ===
Empire Crown was built for the MoWT. She was placed under the management of J & C Harrison Ltd. Her port of registry was South Shields, County Durham. The United Kingdom Official Number 169054 and Code Letters GBPX were allocated.

Empire Crown departed from the Tyne on her maiden voyage on 4 January 1944, joining Convoy FN 1225, which had departed from Southend, Essex on 3 January and arrived at Methil, Fife on 5 January. She then joined Convoy EN 329, which departed from Methil the next day and arrived at Loch Ewe on 8 January. She then made a voyage to Cairnryan, Wigtownshire and the sailed to the Clyde to join Convoy OS66 km, which departed from Liverpool, Lancashire on 24 January and split at sea on 5 February. Empire Crown was in the part of the convoy which became Convoy KMS 40G and arrived at Gibraltar on 7 February. She then joined Convoy KMS 40, which departed Gibraltar that day and arrived at Port Said, Egypt on 18 February. She left the convoy at Augusta, Italy on 13 February. She then joined Convoy VN 21, which departed from August the next day and arrived at Naples on 15 February.

Empire Crown departed Naples on 27 February as a member of Convoy NV 23, which arrived at Augusta on 29 February. That day, she joined Convoy GUS 32, which had departed from Port Said on 24 February and arrived at the Hampton Roads, Virginia, United States on 24 March. She left the convoy at Bône, Algeria on 4 March. She then sailed to Algiers, returned to Bône and then returned to Algiers. On 29 March, she joined Convoy KMS 45, which had departed from Gibraltar on 27 March and arrived at Port Said on 6 April. She left the convoy at Philippeville, Algeria the next day. On 9 April, Empire Crown joined Convoy KMS 46, which had departed from Gibraltar on Gibraltar on 6 April and arrived at Port Said on 16 April. She left the convoy at Augusta on 12 April. The next day, she joined Convoy VN 33, which arrived at Naples on 14 April. She returned with Convoy NV 33, departing Naples on 17 April and arriving back at Augusta on 18 April. Empire Crown then sailed to Tripoli, Libya and back to Augusta, arriving on 27 April. She then joined Convoy VN 36, which departed Augusta on 28 April and arrived at Naples the next day. She left the convoy at Torre Annunziata. She departed Torre Annunziata on 4 May for Naples. On 7 May, she departed Naples as a member of Convoy NV 37, which arrived at Augusta the next day.

Empire Crown then joined Convoy GUS 39, which had departed from Port Said on 4 May and arrived at the Hampton Roads on 29 May. She left the convoy on 15 May at Oran, Algeria. On 29 May, she joined Convoy MKS 50, which had departed from Port Said on 19 May and arrived at Gibraltar on 31 May. She then joined Convoy MKS50G, which departed from Gibraltar that day and rendezvoused at sea with Convoy SL 159MK on 31 May. She was carrying a cargo of vehicles. The combined convoy arrived at Liverpool on 11 June. Empire Crown left the convoy at Loch Ewe on 10 June, joining Convoy WN 595, which arrived at Methil on 13 June. She then joined Convoy FS 1482, which arrived at Southend on 15 June. She left the convoy at Middlesbrough, Yorkshire on 14 June.

Empire Crown departed Middlesbrough on 22 July, joining Convoy FS 1521, which had departed Methil that day and arrived at Southend on 24 July. Between 30 July and 9 September, she sailed between Southend and the Seine Bay in various ETM and FTM convoys. On 10 September, Empire Crown departed from Southend as a member of Convoy FN 1476, which arrived at Methil the next day. She left the convoy at Middlesbrough, and then sailed to the Tyne. On 23 September, she joined Convoy FS 1584, which had departed from Methil that day and arrived at Southend on 25 September. She departed from Southend on 27 September to join Convoy ON 256, which departed from Liverpool on 28 September and arrived at New York City United States on 12 October. She had to leave the convoy and put into Milford Haven, Pembrokeshire, on 7 October. The next day, she sailed to join Convoy ON 258, which had departed from Southend on 6 October and arrived at New York on 24 October. Empire Crown left the convoy at St. John's, Newfoundland, arriving on 20 October. The next day, she departed with Convoy WB 132, arriving at Sydney, Cape Breton, Nova Scotia, Canada on 23 October. She departed the next day as a member of Convoy SH 175, which arrived at Halifax, Nova Scotia on 25 October. Empire Crown then joined Convoy XB 131, which departed from Halifax on 26 October and arrived at the Cape Cod Canal, Massachusetts, United States on 28 October. She then sailed to New York, arriving the next day and departing the day after that for Baltimore, Maryland, arriving on 1 October.

Empire Crown departed from Baltimore on 18 October for the Hampton Roads. She then joined Convoy UGS 61, which departed on 21 November and arrived at Gibraltar on 7 December. She did not dock at Gibraltar, but sailed on to Port Said, arriving on 14 December. From there, she sailed to Suez, Egypt, Aden, Colombo, Ceylon, and Madras, India, where she arrived on 7 January 1945. She departe Madras on 22 January for Calcutta, arriving on 26 January. On 22 February, Empire Crown departed Calcutta for Lourenço Marques, Mozambique, where she arrived on 12 March. She departed Lourenço Marques on 30 March for Buenos Aires, Argentina, where she arrived on 20 April. She then made a return voyage to Rosario, arriving back at Buenos Aires on 4 May.

=== Post-war service ===
Empire Crown departed Buenos Aires on 15 May and sailed to Gibraltar via Montevideo, Uruguay. She then sailed to Newport, Monmouthshire and Avonmouth, Somerset, arriving on 26 June. In 1945, Empire Crown was transferred to the French Government and renamed Capitaine G Lacoley. She was operated under the management of Armement Chastellain. The ship was named after Gaston Lacoley, the French captain of the merchant ship Charles LD, which was torpedoed and sunk on 9 December 1942.

in 1961, Capitaine G Lacoley was sold to Mparmpapetros Shipping Co SA, Greece and renamed Mparmpa Petros. Operated under the management of Pateras Shipbrokers Ltd, London, she served until 22 May 1963, when she ran aground at Porto de Pedras, Brazil and was wrecked.
