= Governors Island (Prince Edward Island) =

Canadian island

Coordinates: 46°08′09″N 63°03′32″W

Location of Governors Island in PEI

Governors Island is a Canadian island located in Hillsborough Bay, a sub-basin of the Northumberland Strait along the south shore of Prince Edward Island.

The island is located at 46'08"N, 63'04"W, approximately 7 kilometres (4 nautical miles) south from Keppoch and 7 km (4 nmi) north from Point Prim.

Roughly triangular in shape with an area of 32 hectares (80 acres), the western point of Governors Island was used in the past for a lobster processing facility and the remainder of the land was used as an area to graze sheep and cattle. During World War II, attempts were made to drill for oil to fuel the war effort, though none was found. Privately owned, the island had a small airstrip developed during the 1960s but has since fallen into disuse. There is a nature preserve on the island.

== Bird area ==
Governors Island supports a colony of double-crested cormorants with an annual average of about 950 nests.
