= Porto de Pedras =

Municipality of Alagoas, Brazil

- Municipality of Alagoas, Brazil
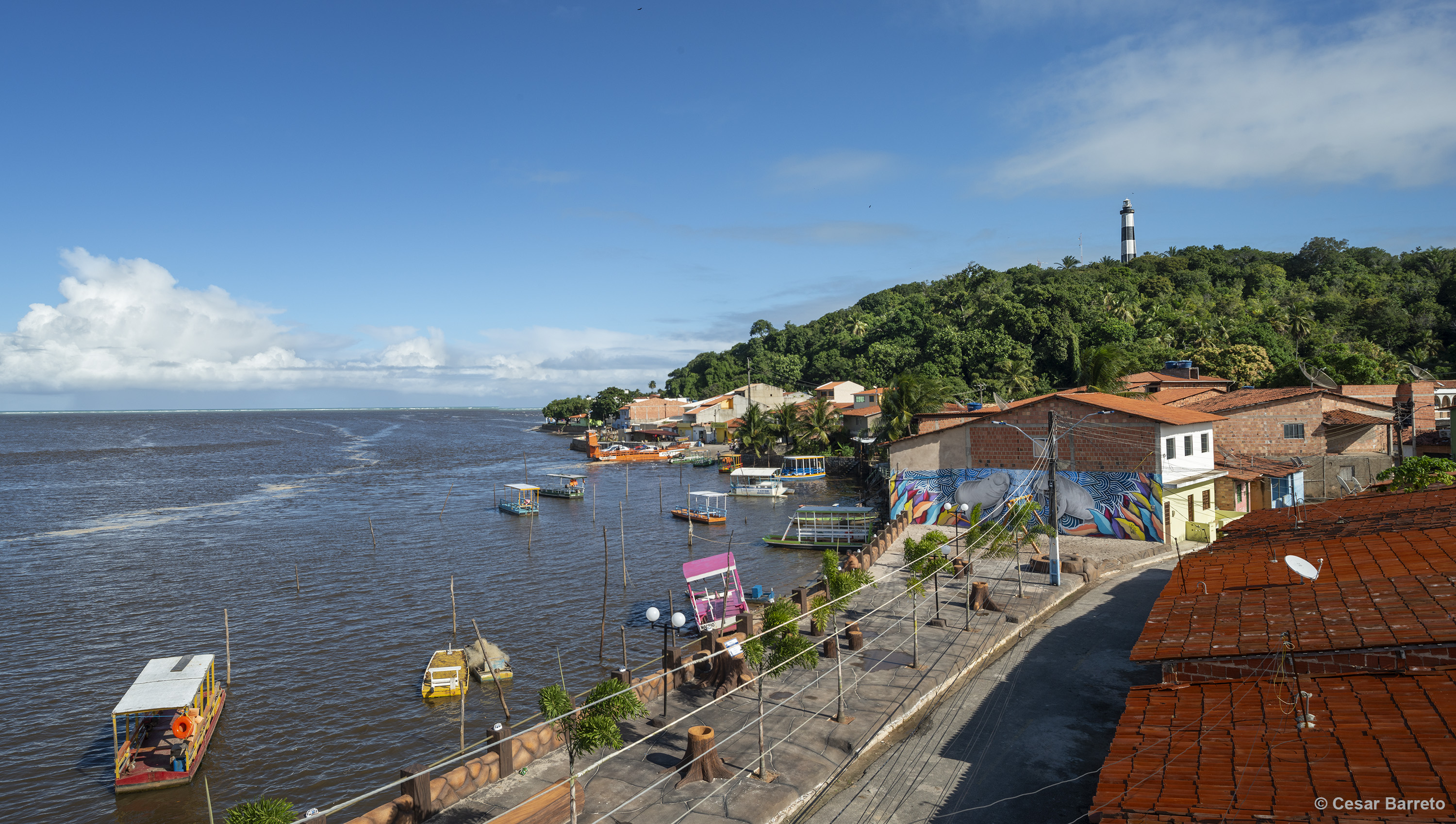
- Porto de Pedras with its lighthouse in the background

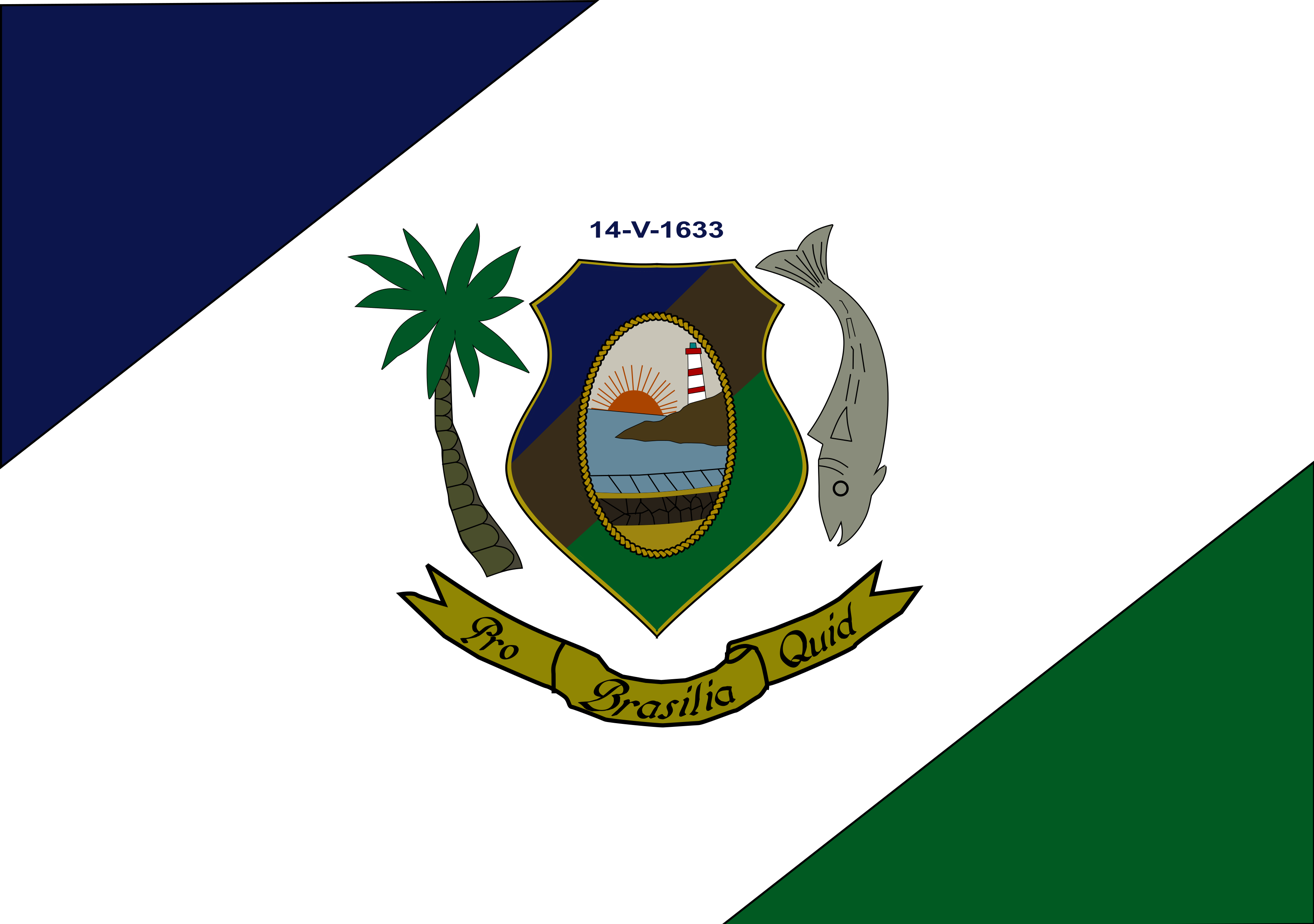
- Flag
- Etymology: In English "Port of Stones", due to its location between the sea and a rocky slope
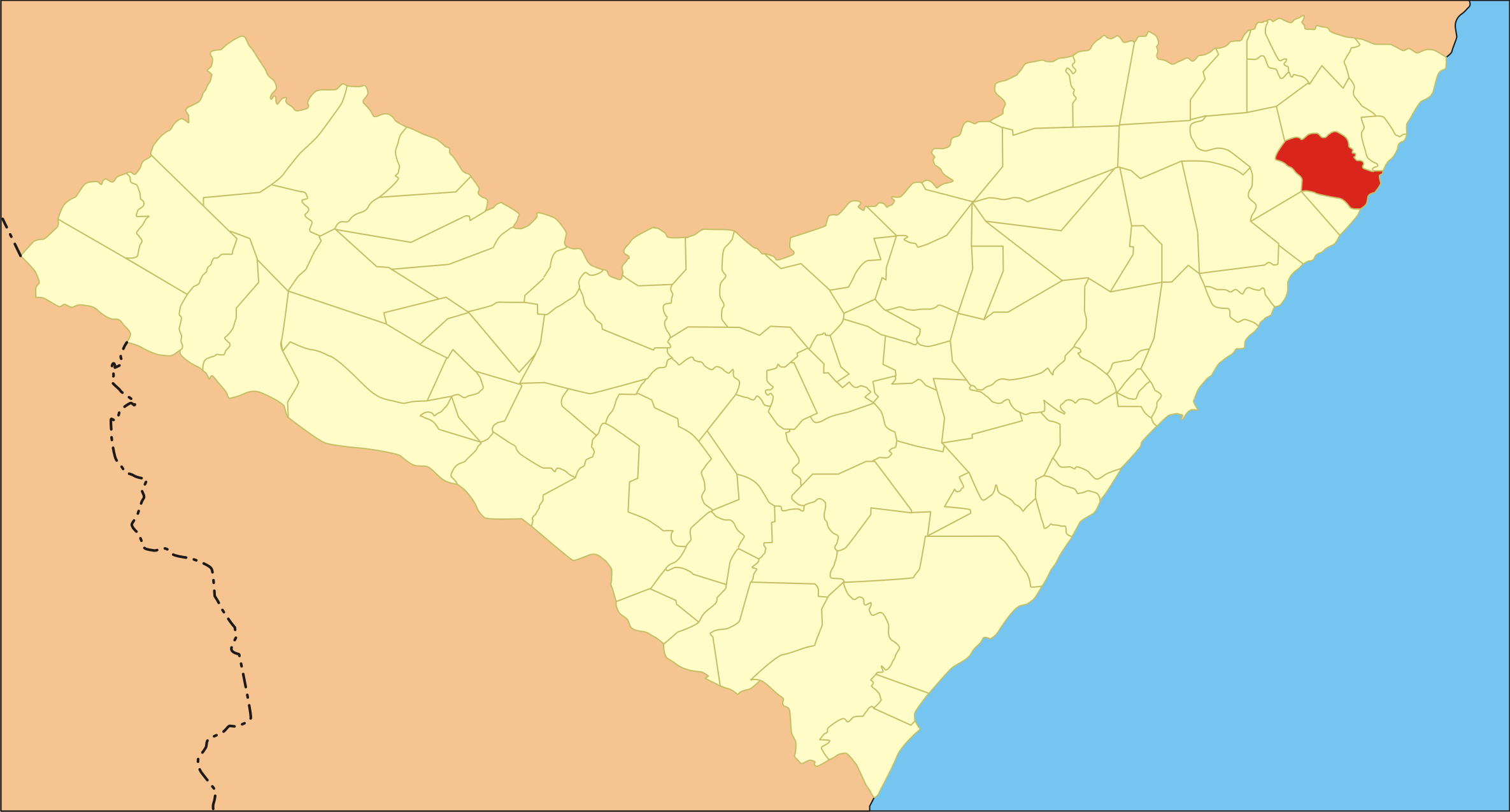
- Location of Porto de Pedras in Alagoas

- Location within Brazil Location within South America
- Coordinates: 9°9′28″S 35°17′42″W
- Country: Brazil
- Region: Northeast
- State: Alagoas
- Founded: 9 June 1921

Government
  - Mayor: Allan de Jesus Silva (MDB) (2025-2028)
  - Vice Mayor: Euda Santos Silva (PSB) (2025-2028)

Area
  - Total: 257.105 km^{2} (99.269 sq mi)
- Elevation: 15 m (49 ft)

Population (2022)
  - Total: 9,295
  - Density: 36.15/km^{2} (93.6/sq mi)
- Demonym: Porto-pedrense (Brazilian Portuguese)
- Time zone: UTC-03:00 (Brasília Time)
- Postal code: 57945-000, 57948-000
- HDI (2010): 0.541 – low
- Website: portodepedras.al.gov.br

Porto de Pedras (Central northeastern portuguese pronunciation: [ˈpoɦtʊ ˈdɪ ˈpɛd(ɾ)ɐ]) is a municipality located in the northern coast of the Brazilian state of Alagoas. Its population was 7,701 in 2020. Its area is 266 km^{2} (103 sq mi).

== Geography ==
=== Climate ===
Climate data for Porto de Pedras (1981–2010, extremes 1961–present)
Month	Jan	Feb	Mar	Apr	May	Jun	Jul	Aug	Sep	Oct	Nov	Dec	Year
Record high °C (°F)	32.0 (89.6)	32.6 (90.7)	33.4 (92.1)	32.6 (90.7)	31.7 (89.1)	30.5 (86.9)	37.1 (98.8)	30.3 (86.5)	37.3 (99.1)	30.7 (87.3)	31.2 (88.2)	32.5 (90.5)	37.3 (99.1)
Mean daily maximum °C (°F)	30.2 (86.4)	30.6 (87.1)	30.5 (86.9)	30.0 (86.0)	29.1 (84.4)	28.0 (82.4)	27.4 (81.3)	27.4 (81.3)	28.2 (82.8)	29.3 (84.7)	29.9 (85.8)	30.3 (86.5)	29.2 (84.6)
Daily mean °C (°F)	27.2 (81.0)	27.5 (81.5)	27.4 (81.3)	27.1 (80.8)	26.2 (79.2)	25.3 (77.5)	24.7 (76.5)	24.6 (76.3)	25.4 (77.7)	26.2 (79.2)	26.8 (80.2)	27.1 (80.8)	26.3 (79.3)
Mean daily minimum °C (°F)	24.0 (75.2)	24.1 (75.4)	23.9 (75.0)	23.7 (74.7)	22.9 (73.2)	22.3 (72.1)	21.7 (71.1)	21.6 (70.9)	22.5 (72.5)	23.1 (73.6)	23.8 (74.8)	24.0 (75.2)	23.1 (73.6)
Record low °C (°F)	18.3 (64.9)	18.3 (64.9)	19.4 (66.9)	19.2 (66.6)	17.7 (63.9)	17.2 (63.0)	16.1 (61.0)	15.8 (60.4)	17.3 (63.1)	13.0 (55.4)	17.2 (63.0)	19.1 (66.4)	13.0 (55.4)
Average precipitation mm (inches)	68.2 (2.69)	90.9 (3.58)	201.1 (7.92)	211.6 (8.33)	227.6 (8.96)	305.7 (12.04)	240.4 (9.46)	166.2 (6.54)	91.9 (3.62)	43.2 (1.70)	32.5 (1.28)	39.6 (1.56)	1,718.9 (67.67)
Average precipitation days (≥ 1.0 mm)	7	9	12	15	17	20	20	16	9	6	4	5	140
Mean monthly sunshine hours	282.8	240.3	256.4	225.2	213.9	180.2	185.3	213.9	246.1	276.0	291.8	292.7	2,904.6
Source 1: Instituto Nacional de Meteorologia
Source 2: Meteo Climat (record highs and lows)

== Gallery ==
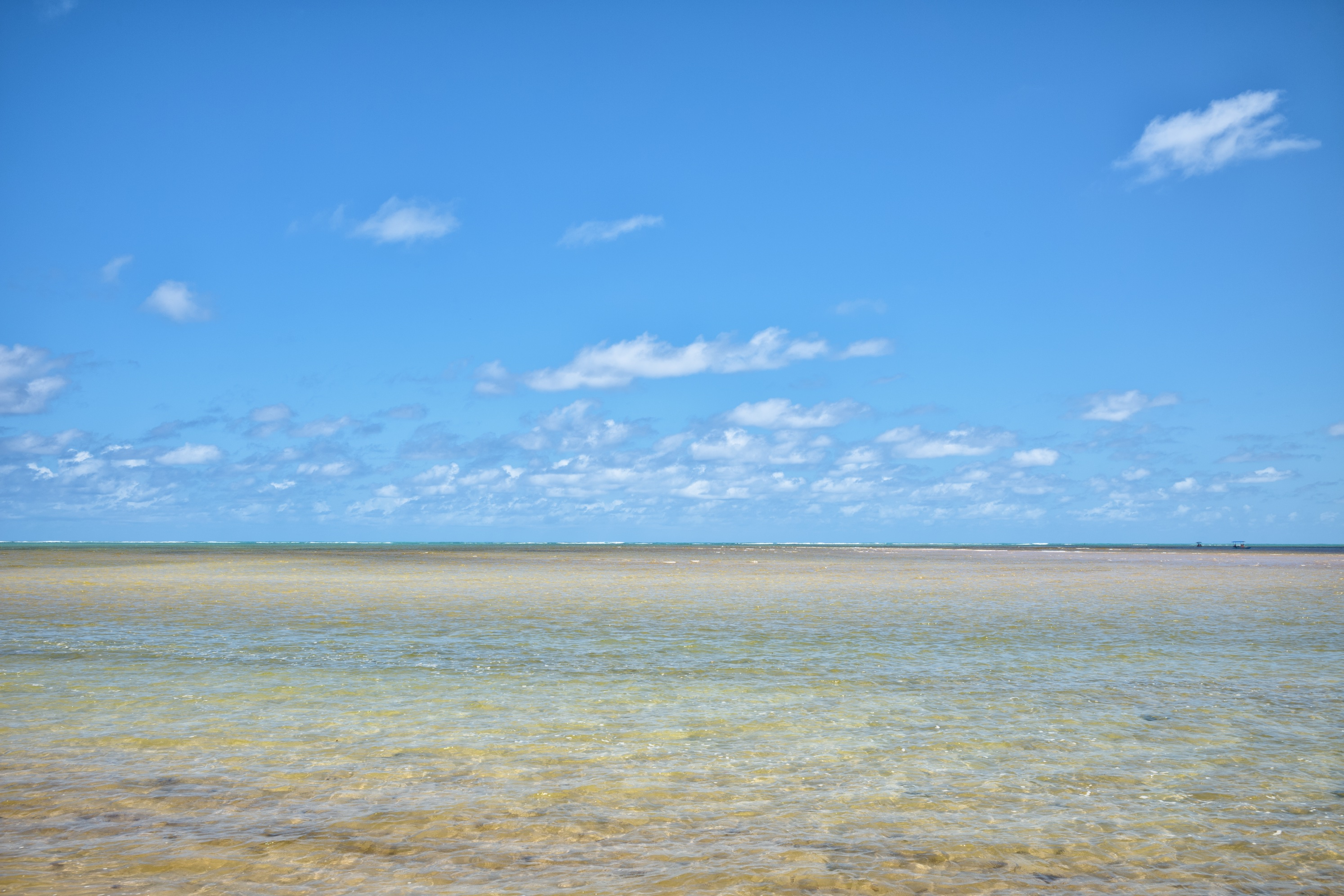
Tatuamunha Beach

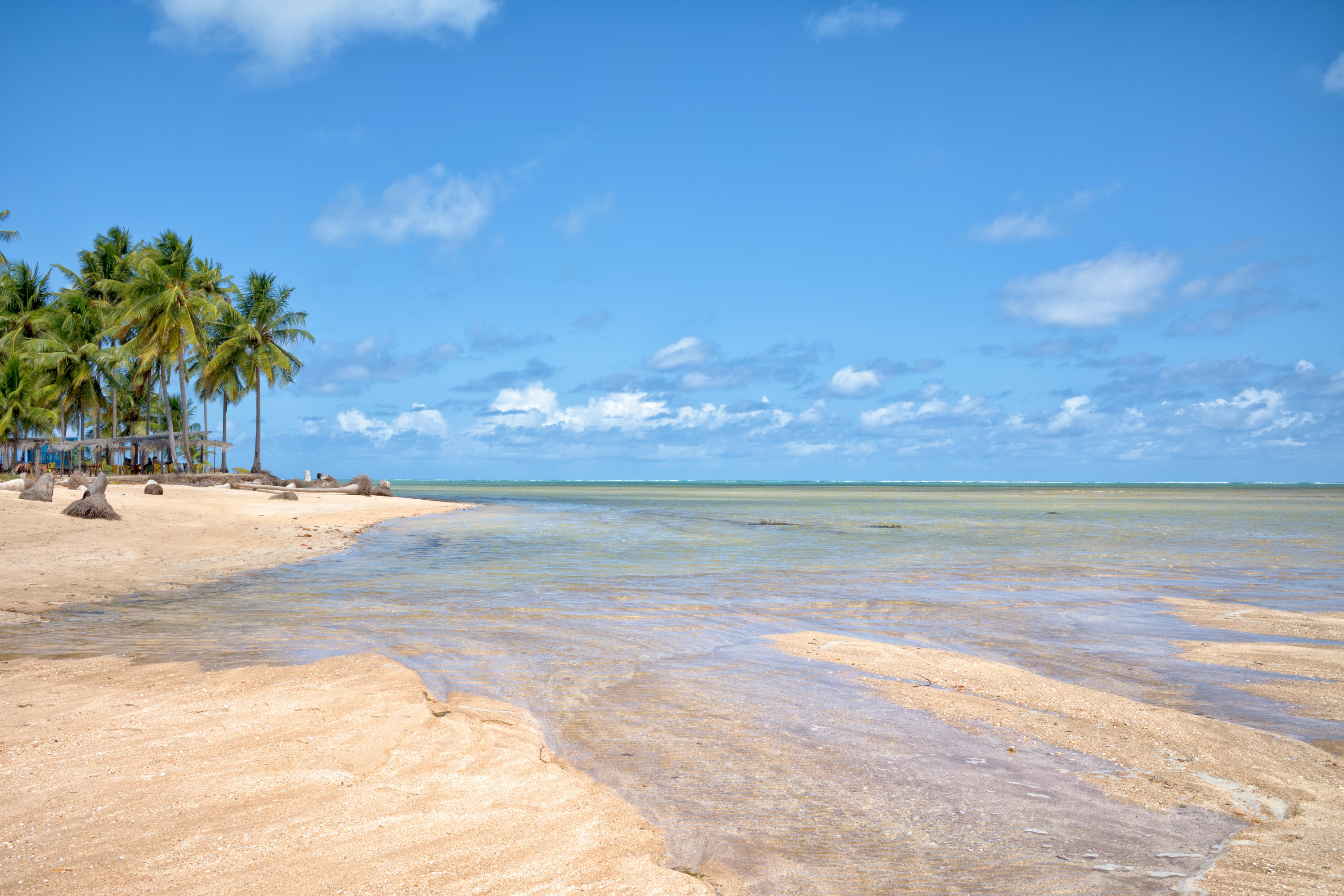
Tatuamunha Beach

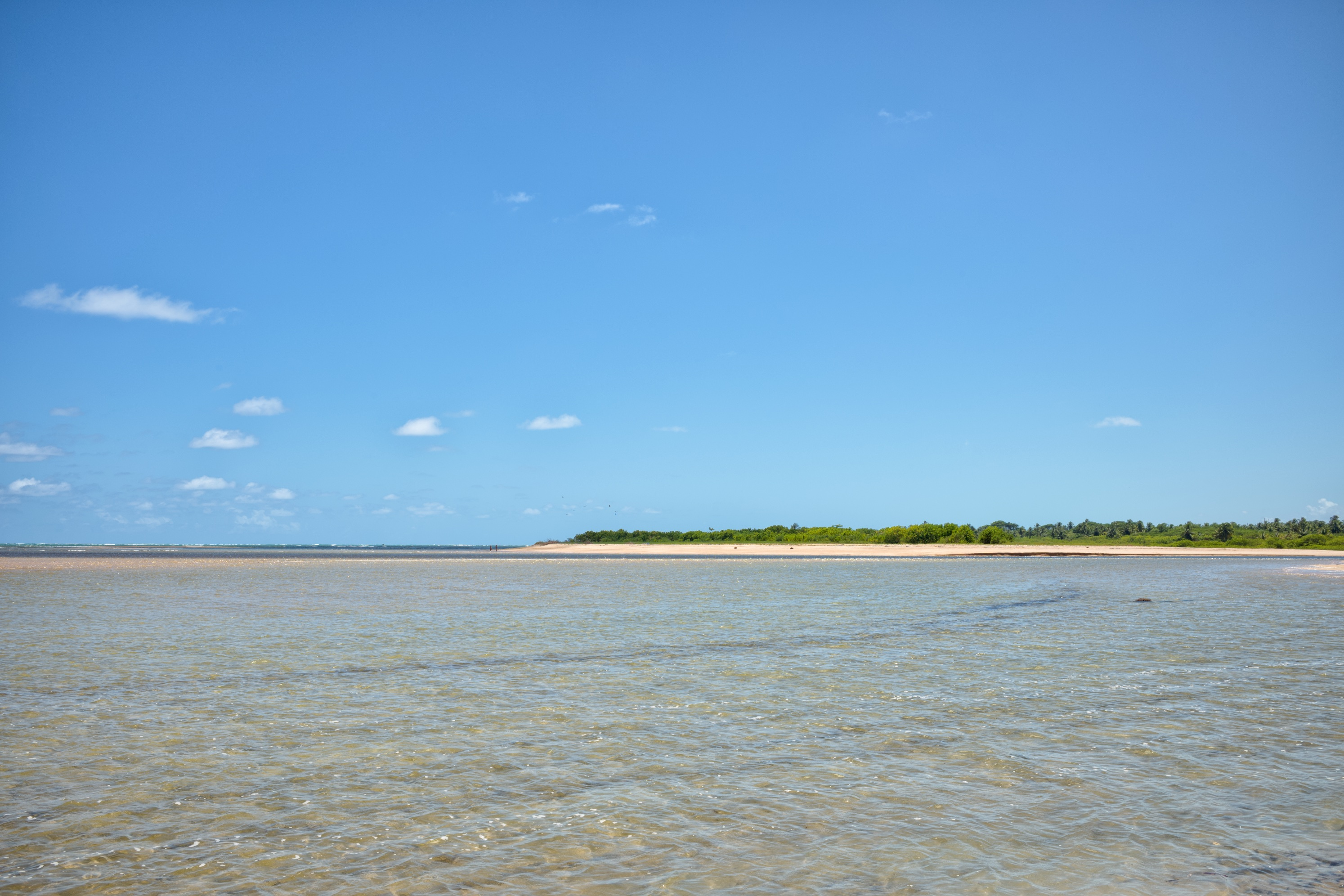
Tatuamunha Beach

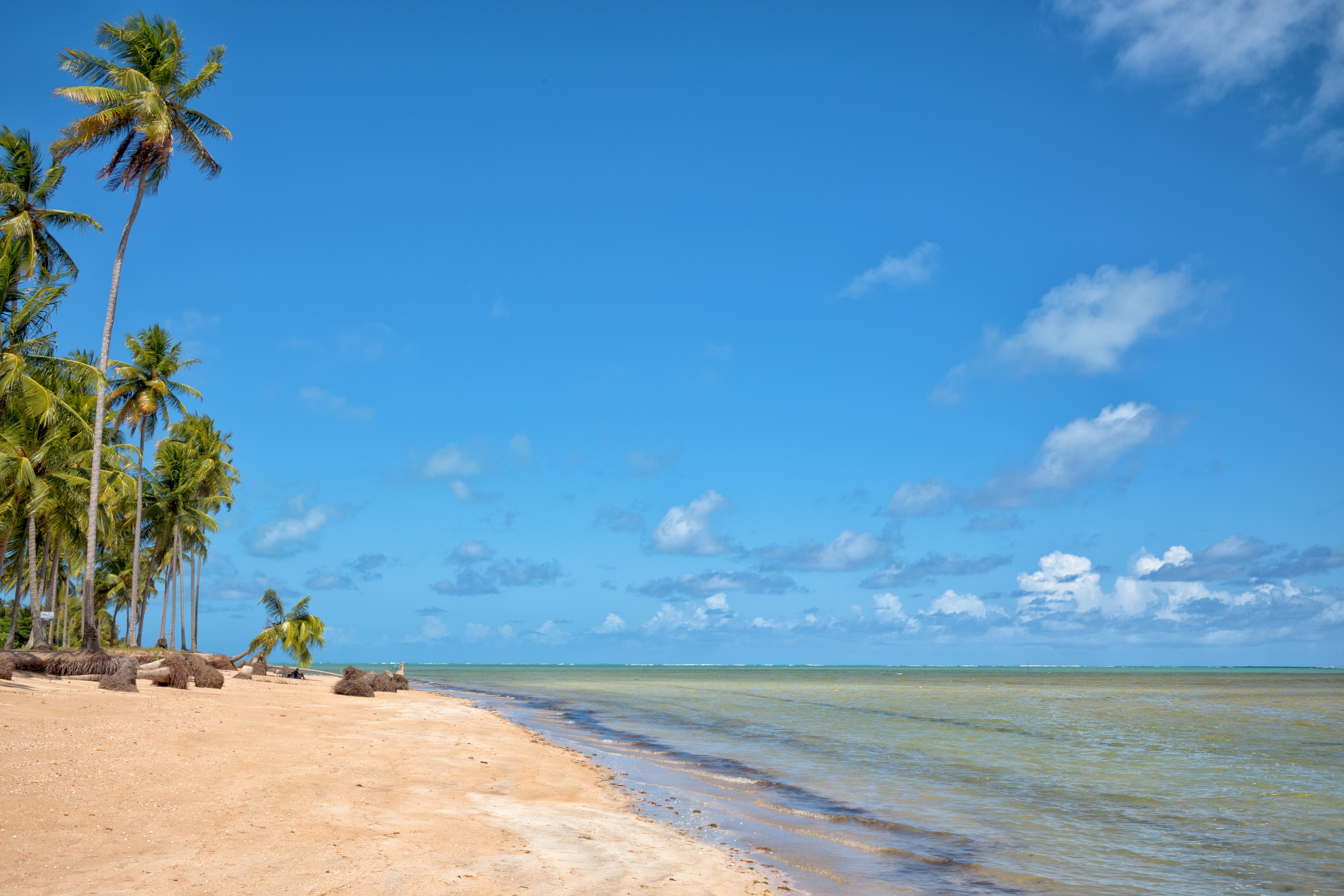
Lages Beach

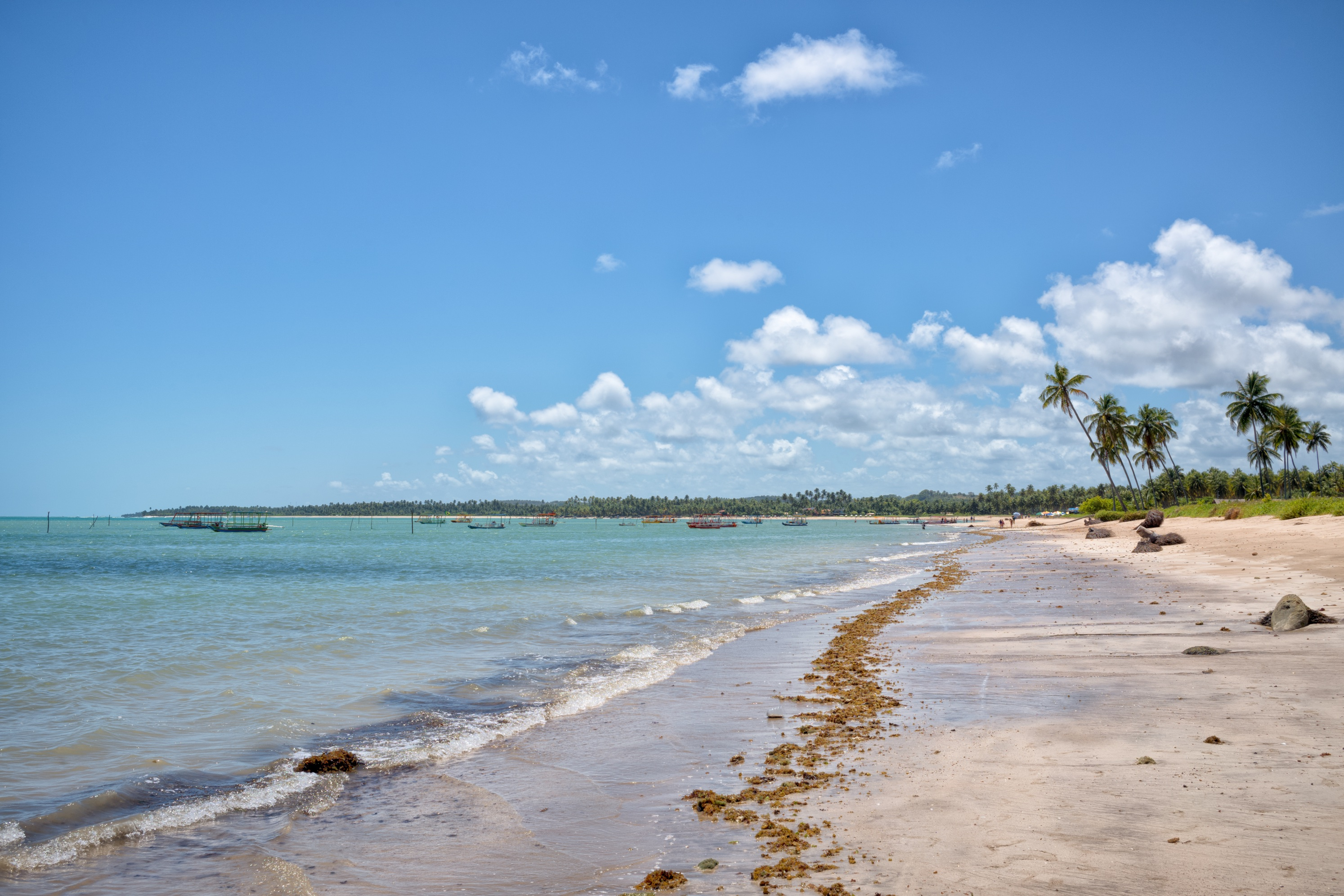
Lages Beach

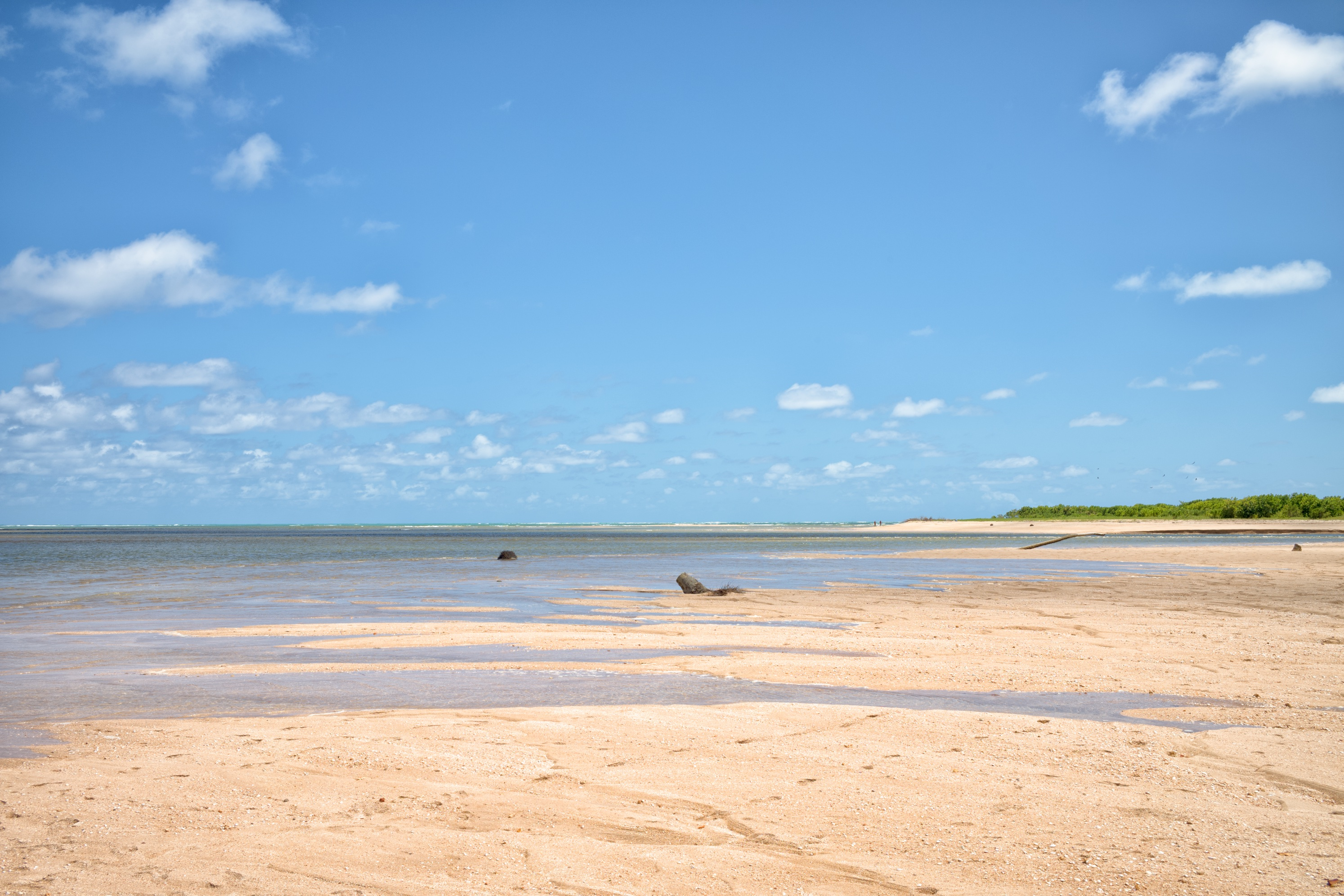
Tatuamunha Beach

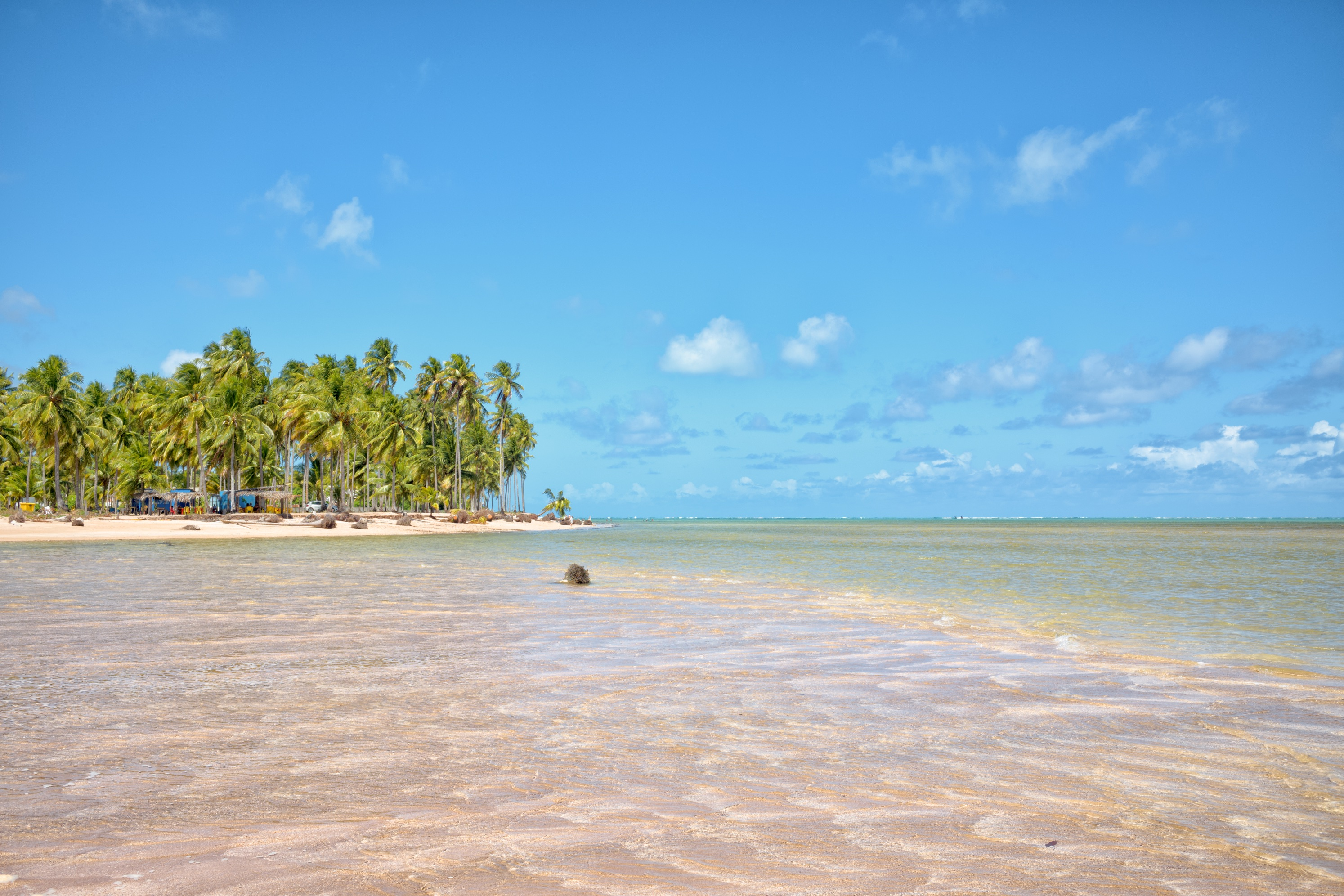
Tatuamunha Beach

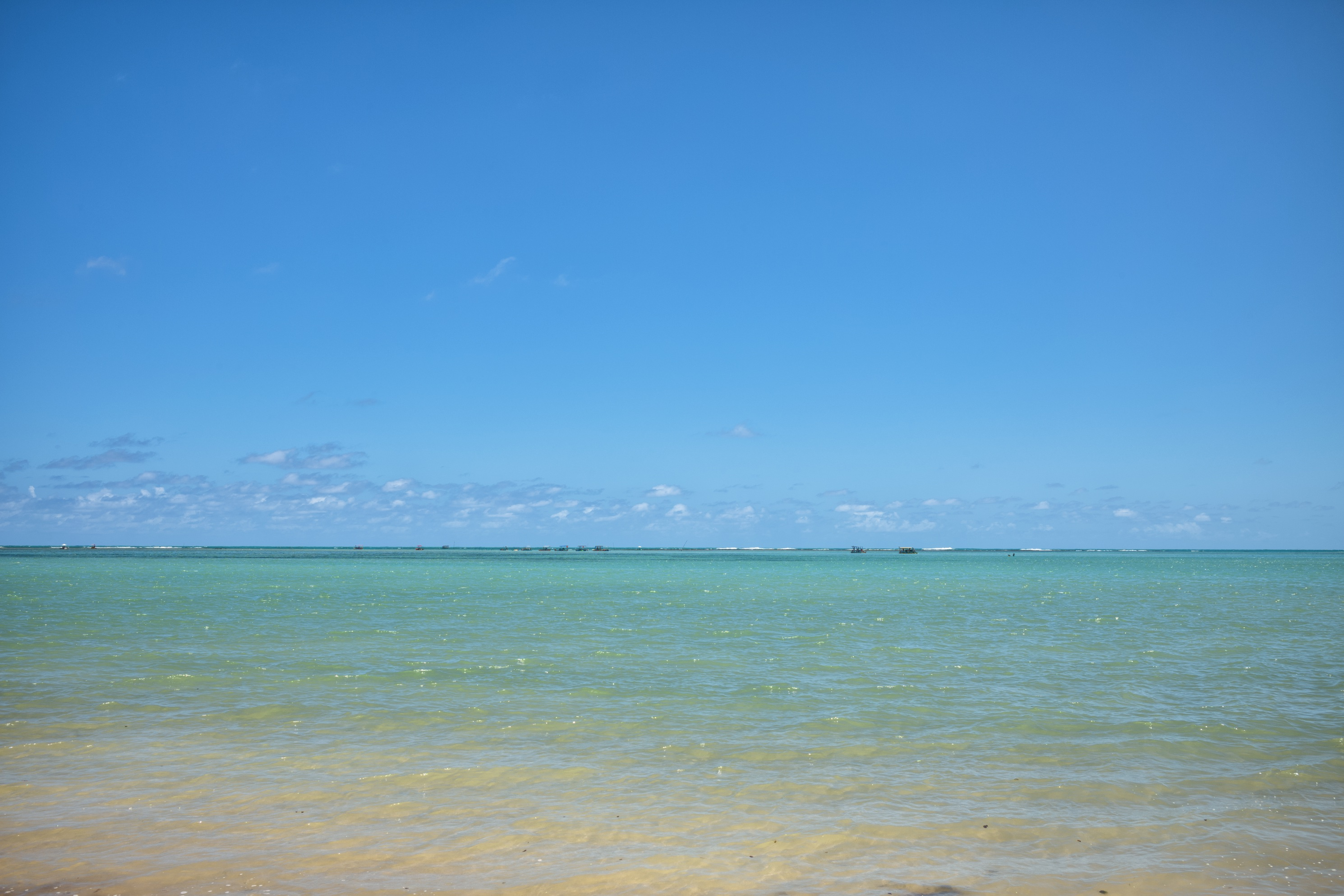
Patacho Beach

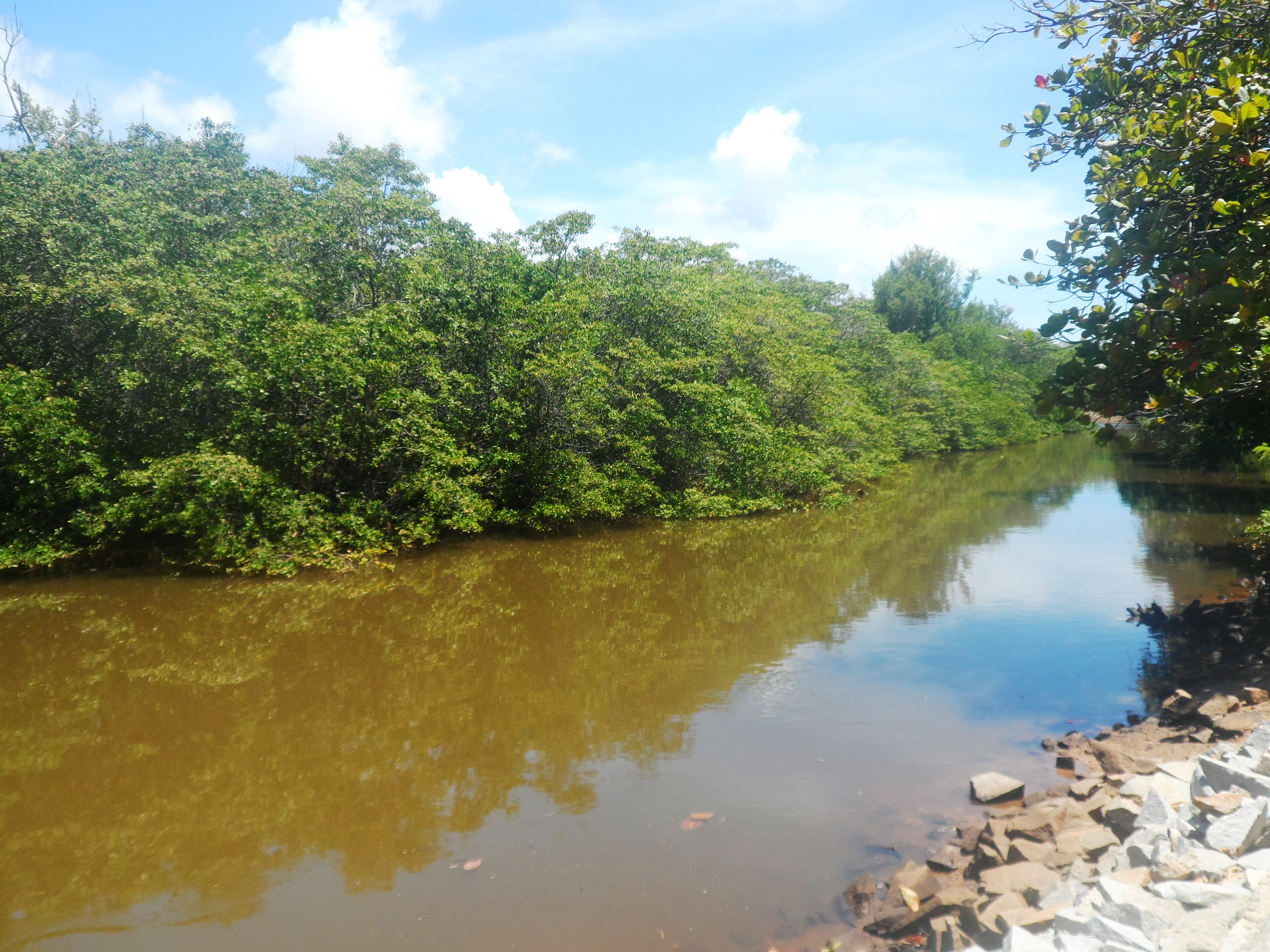
Tatuamunha River

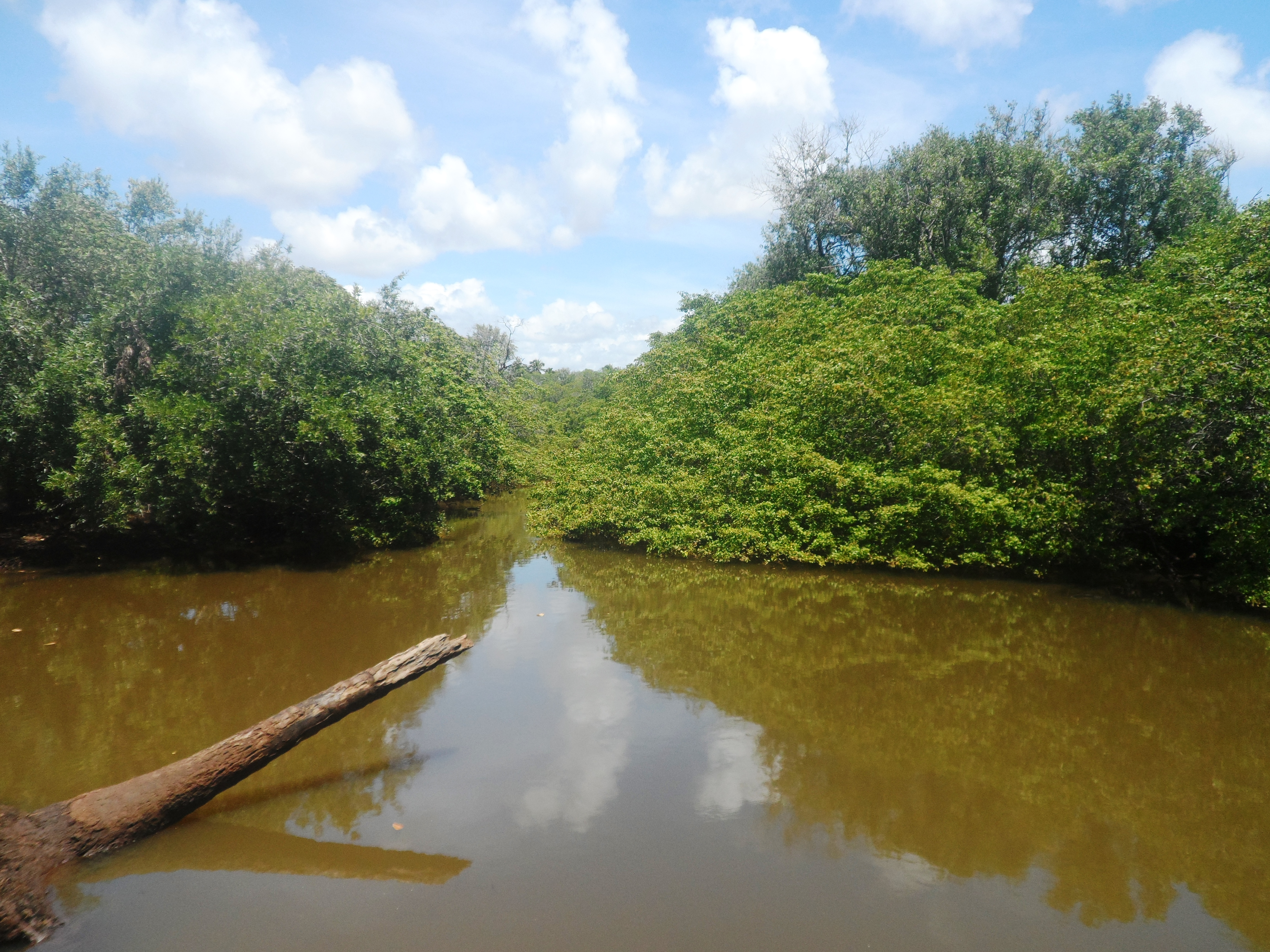
Tatuamunha River

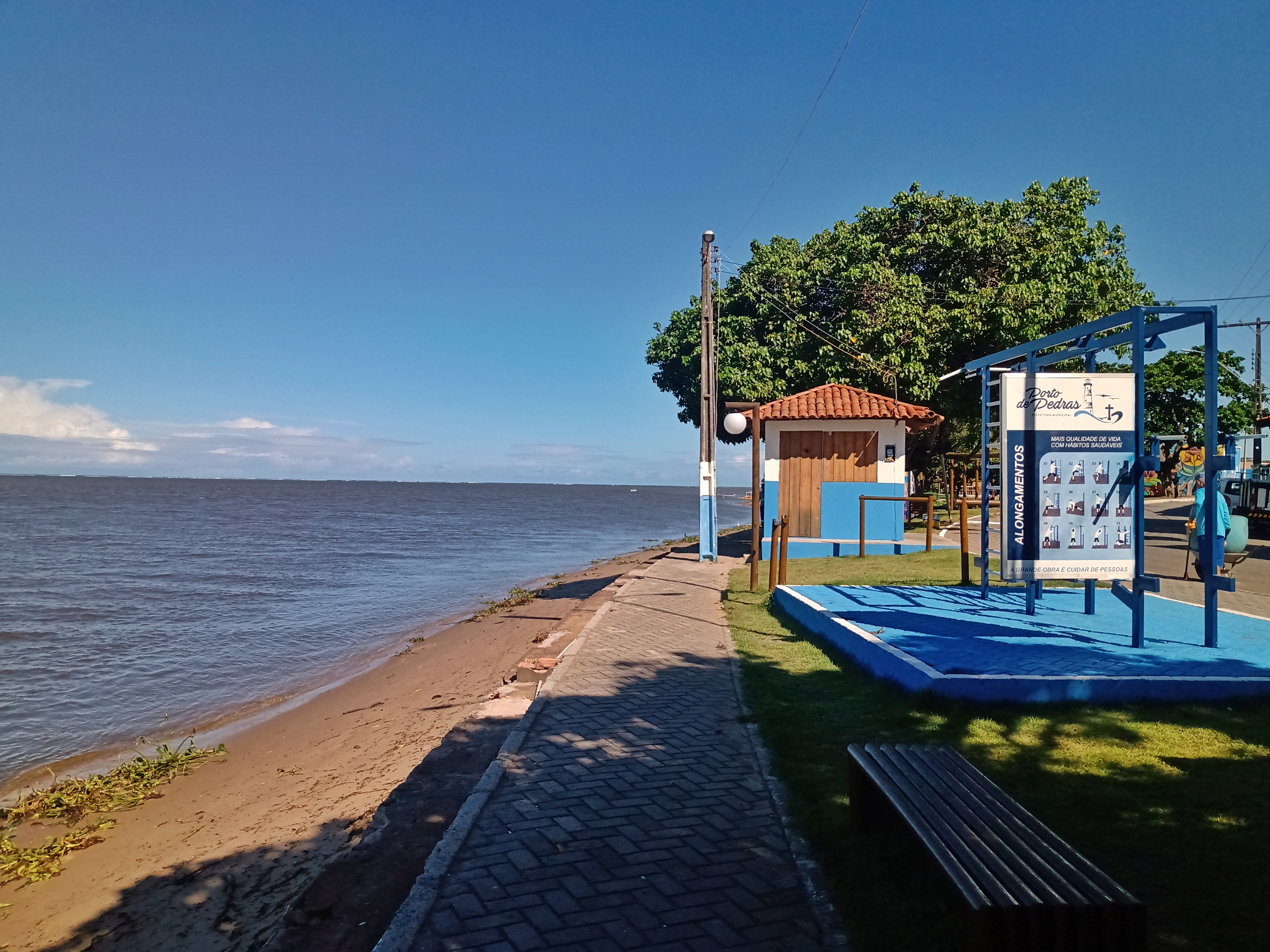
Rua da Piedade at the waterfront

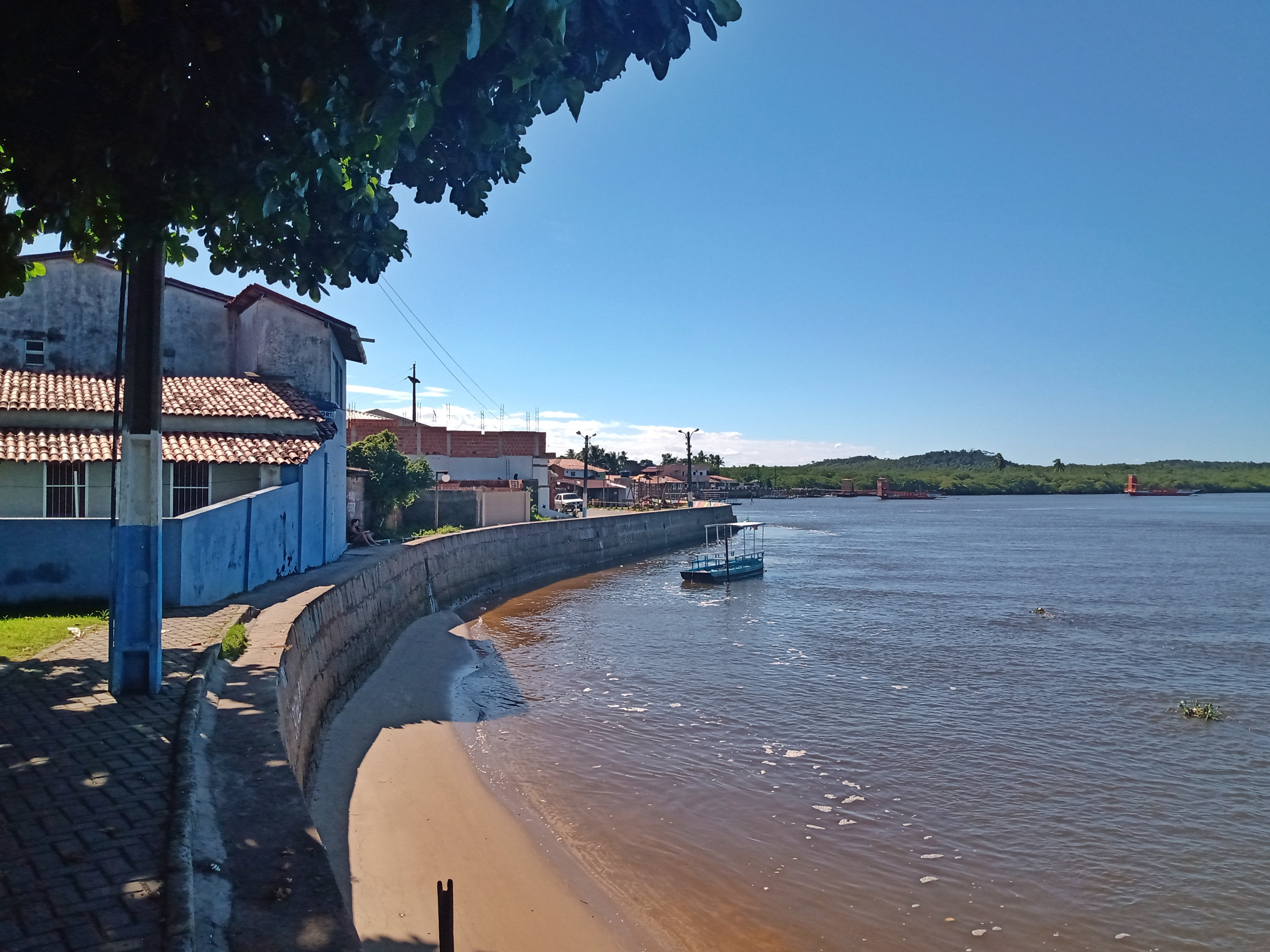
Waterfront

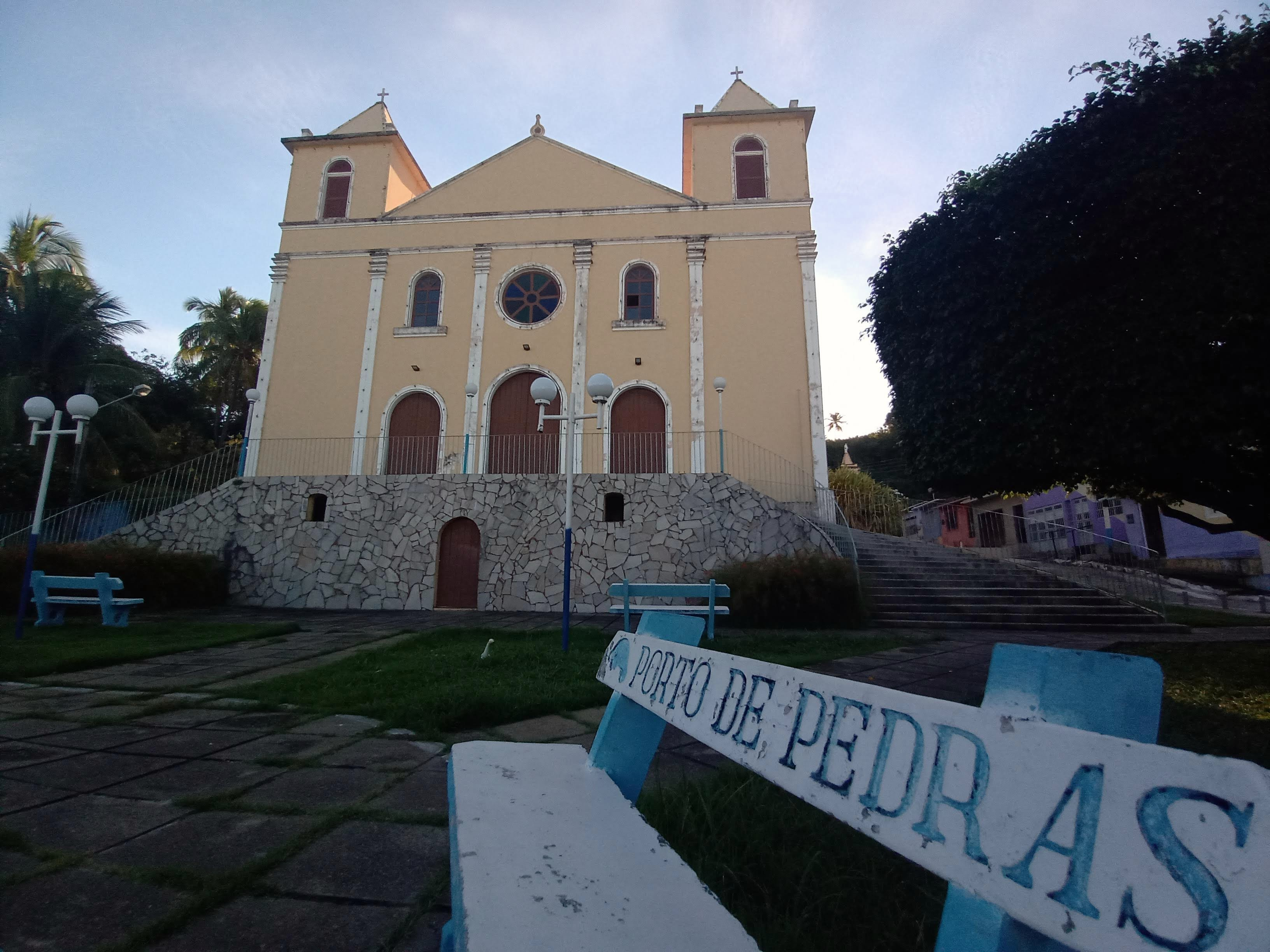
Our Lady of Glory Parish Church

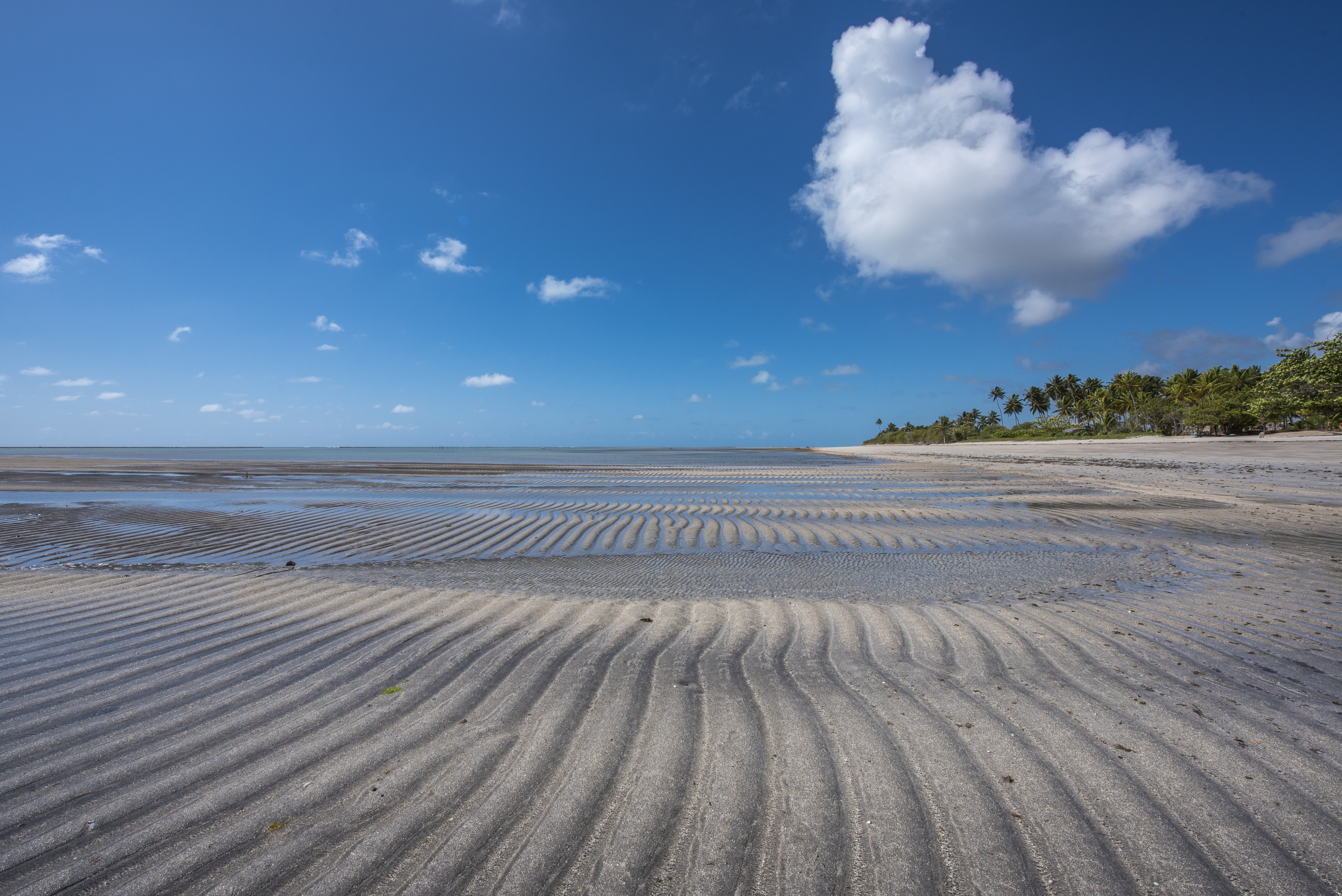
Porto de Pedras Beach

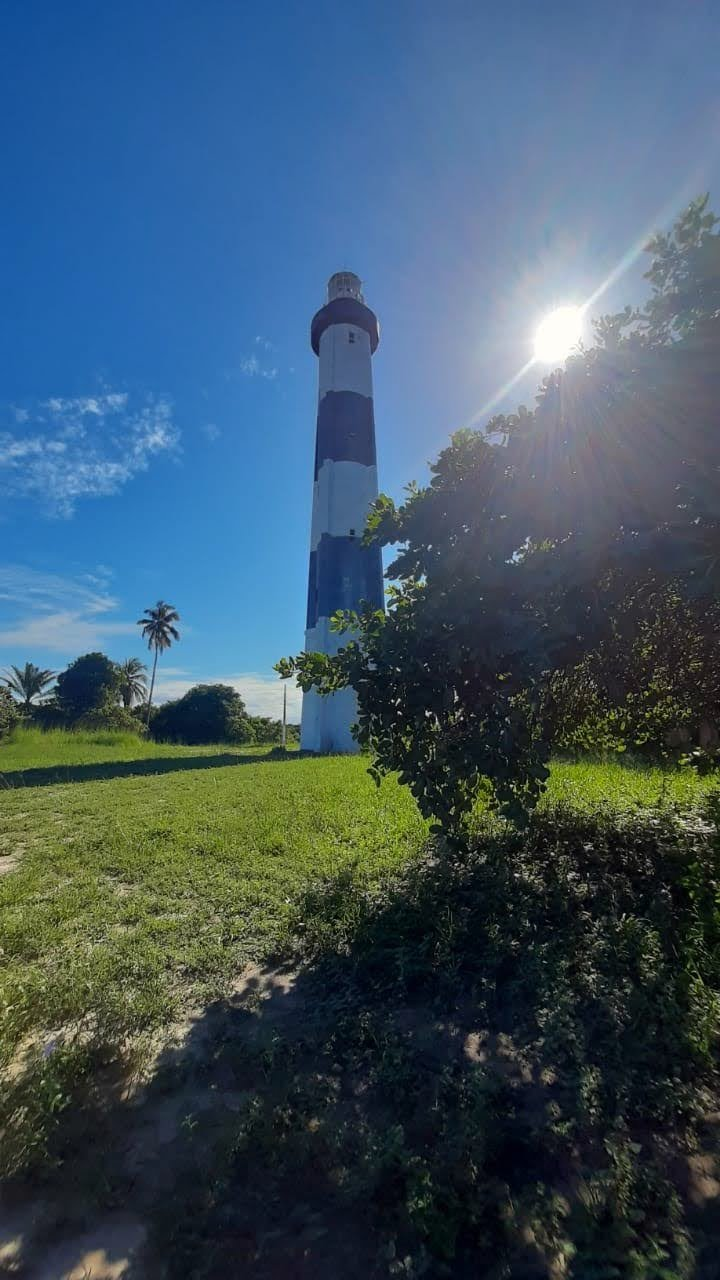
Porto de Pedras Lighthouse

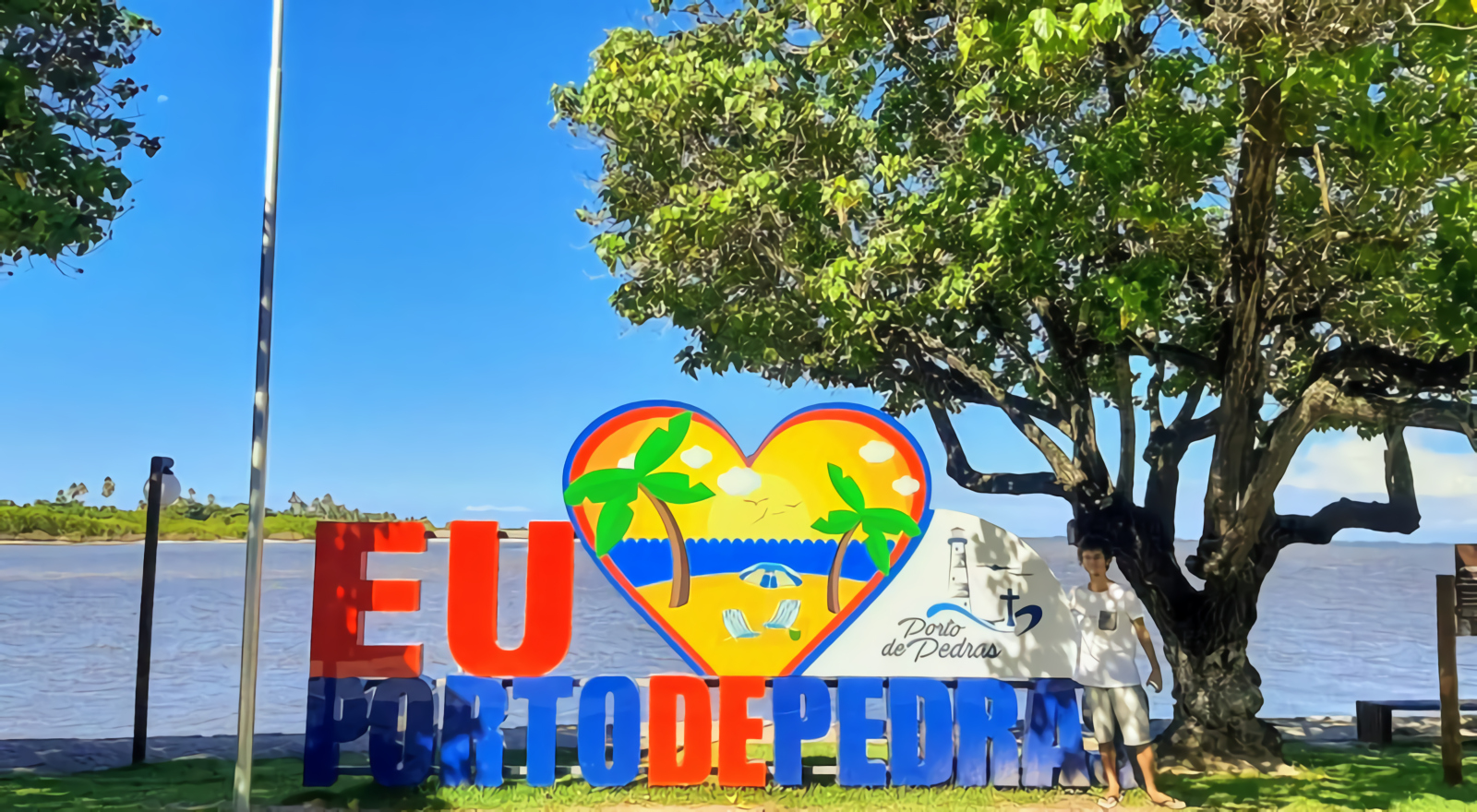
Tourist sign

== See also ==
- List of municipalities in Alagoas
