= Bob Levy (Canadian politician) =

Canadian politician

MLA for Kings South
- In office 1984–1988
- Preceded by: Paul Kinsman
- Succeeded by: Derrick Kimball

Personal details
- Party: New Democratic Party

Robert Clifford Levy, Jr. is a Canadian politician and judge. He represented the electoral district of Kings South in the Nova Scotia House of Assembly from 1984 to 1988. He was a member of the Nova Scotia New Democratic Party.

== Early life and education ==
Levy graduated from Acadia University in 1968 with a Bachelor of Arts degree and subsequently from Dalhousie Law School in 1971 with a Bachelor of Laws.

== Political career ==
Levy first attempted to enter politics in the 1979 federal election, finishing third as the New Democratic Party candidate in Annapolis Valley—Hants. He ran again in the 1980 federal election, but again finished third. In the 1981 provincial election, Levy ran in the Kings North riding, placing second behind Progressive Conservative incumbent Edward Twohig. In January 1984, Levy was nominated as the NDP candidate for a byelection in Kings South resulting from the resignation of MLA Harry How. On February 21, 1984, Levy finished second in the byelection, losing to Progressive Conservative candidate Paul Kinsman by 917 votes. In the 1984 election, Levy ran again in Kings South, defeating Kinsman by 21 votes. Levy was nominated to seek re-election in 1988, but resigned the day before the election was called when Nova Scotia Premier John Buchanan appointed him a family court judge.
