= Kings North =

Provincial electoral district in Nova Scotia, Canada

Nova Scotia electoral district

Provincial electoral district
- Legislature: Nova Scotia House of Assembly
MLA
John Lohr
Progressive Conservative
- District created: 1956
- First contested: 1956
- Last contested: 2024

Demographics
- Population (2011): 19,842
- Electors: 15,848
- Area (km²): 483.00
- Pop. density (per km²): 41.1
- Census division: Kings County

Kings North is a provincial electoral district in Nova Scotia, Canada, that elects one member of the Nova Scotia House of Assembly.

The electoral district was formed through redistribution in 1956. It was previously part of the district of Kings.

== District profile ==
Agriculture is a major industry in Kings North. The district has many geographical features of note, including Cape Blomidon, Cape Split, and the Minas Basin. Also in the district is Blomidon Provincial Park.

Communities within Kings North include:

- Aldershot
- Baxters Harbour
- Billtown
- Blomidon
- Buckleys Corner
- Canada Creek
- Canard
- Canning
- Centreville
- Chipman Brook
- Glenmont
- Habitant
- Halls Harbour
- Town of Kentville
- Kingsport
- Kinsmans Corner
- Lakeville
- Lower Canard
- Medford
- Port Williams
- Ross Corner
- Scots Bay
- Sheffield Mills
- Starr's Point

== Members of the Legislative Assembly ==
Kings North has elected the following members of the Legislative Assembly:

Kings North
Legislature	Years	Member	Party
Riding created from Kings
46th	1956–1960	Eric Balcom	Liberal
47th	1960–1963	Gladys Porter	Progressive Conservative
48th	1963–1967	Gladys Porter	Progressive Conservative
49th	1967–1970	Victor Thorpe	Progressive Conservative
50th	1970–1974	Victor Thorpe	Progressive Conservative
51st	1974–1978	Glenn Ells	Liberal
52nd	1978–1981	Edward Twohig	Progressive Conservative
53rd	1981–1984	Edward Twohig	Progressive Conservative
54th	1984–1988	George Archibald	Progressive Conservative
55th	1988–1993	George Archibald	Progressive Conservative
56th	1993–1998	George Archibald	Progressive Conservative
57th	1998–1999	George Archibald	Progressive Conservative
58th	1999–2003	Mark Parent	Progressive Conservative
59th	2003–2006	Mark Parent	Progressive Conservative
60th	2006–2009	Mark Parent	Progressive Conservative
61st	2009–2013	Jim Morton	New Democratic
62nd	2013–2017	John Lohr	Progressive Conservative
63rd	2017–2021	John Lohr	Progressive Conservative
64th	2021–2024	John Lohr	Progressive Conservative
65th	2024–present	John Lohr	Progressive Conservative

== Election results ==
=== 2024 ===
2024 Nova Scotia general election
Party	Candidate	Votes	%	±%
Progressive Conservative	John Lohr	4,047	53.67	+8.96
New Democratic	Gillian Yorke	2,095	27.78	+6.66
Liberal	Richelle Brown Redden	1,260	16.71	-12.58
Green	Dave Lowe	139	1.84	-2.56
Total valid votes		7,541		
Total rejected ballots		33		
Turnout		7,575	44.17	
Eligible voters		17,151		
Progressive Conservative hold		Swing		
Source: Elections Nova Scotia

=== 2021 ===
2021 Nova Scotia general election
Party	Candidate	Votes	%	±%	Expenditures
Progressive Conservative	John Lohr	3,971	44.70	-1.24	$45,336.80
Liberal	Geof Turner	2,602	29.29	-4.17	$44,819.91
New Democratic	Erin Patterson	1,876	21.12	+4.93	$45,345.49
Green	Doug Hickman	391	4.40	+0.86	$16,083.69
Atlantica	Paul Dunn	43	0.48	-0.38	$200.00
Total valid votes/expense limit		8,833	99.69	–	$92,838.34
Total rejected ballots		28	0.31		
Turnout		8,911	55.30		
Eligible voters		16,115			
Progressive Conservative hold		Swing		+1.47	
Source: Elections Nova Scotia

=== 2017 ===
2017 Nova Scotia general election
Party	Candidate	Votes	%	±%
Progressive Conservative	John Lohr	3,823	45.94	+13.45
Liberal	Geof Turner	2,784	33.46	+2.26
New Democratic	Ted Champion	1,347	16.19	-16.07
Green	Mary Lou Harley	295	3.54	-0.51
Atlantica	Bryden Deadder	72	0.86	
Total valid votes		8,321	100	
Total rejected ballots		32	0.38	
Turnout		8,353	52.71	
Eligible voters		15,848		
Progressive Conservative hold		Swing		+11.19
Source: Elections Nova Scotia

2017 provincial election redistributed results
Party	Vote	%
Progressive Conservative	3,819	45.94
Liberal	2,781	33.45
New Democratic	1,346	16.19
Green	295	3.55
Atlantica	72	0.87

=== 2013 ===
2013 Nova Scotia general election
Party	Candidate	Votes	%	±%
Progressive Conservative	John Lohr	2,904	32.55	-3.53
New Democratic	Jim Morton	2,872	32.19	-9.24
Liberal	Sephen W. Pearl	2,784	31.20	13.14
Green	Mary Lou Harley	362	4.06	-0.37
Total		8,922	–	
Source(s) Source: Nova Scotia Legislature (2024). "Electoral History for Kings North" (PDF). nslegislature.ca. Nova Scotia, Chief Electoral Officer (2013). 39th Provincial General Election, October 8, 2013: Volume 1 – Statement of Votes & Statistics (PDF) (Report). Elections Nova Scotia. Archived from the original (PDF) on 10 April 2018.

=== 2009 ===
2009 Nova Scotia general election
Party	Candidate	Votes	%	±%
New Democratic	Jim Morton	3,535	41.43	15.15
Progressive Conservative	Mark Parent	3,079	36.08	-14.00
Liberal	Shirley Fisher	1,541	18.06	-3.22
Green	Anna-Maria Galante-Ward	378	4.43	2.07
Total		8,533	–	
Source(s) Source: Nova Scotia Legislature (2024). "Electoral History for Kings North" (PDF). nslegislature.ca.

=== 2006 ===
2006 Nova Scotia general election
Party	Candidate	Votes	%	±%
Progressive Conservative	Mark Parent	4,138	50.08	-0.12
New Democratic	Jim Morton	2,171	26.28	-2.64
Liberal	Madonna Spinazola	1,758	21.28	2.34
Green	Chris Alders	195	2.36	–
Total		8,262	–	
Source(s) Source: Nova Scotia Legislature (2024). "Electoral History for Kings North" (PDF). nslegislature.ca.

=== 2003 ===
2003 Nova Scotia general election
Party	Candidate	Votes	%	±%
Progressive Conservative	Mark Parent	4,063	50.20	1.15
New Democratic	Jim Morton	2,340	28.91	0.39
Liberal	Michael Landry	1,533	18.94	-3.48
Marijuana	Ben Friesen	157	1.94	–
Total		8,093	–	
Source(s) Source: Nova Scotia Legislature (2024). "Electoral History for Kings North" (PDF). nslegislature.ca.

=== 1999 ===
1999 Nova Scotia general election
Party	Candidate	Votes	%	±%
Progressive Conservative	Mark Parent	4,321	49.05	7.60
New Democratic	Neil H. McNeil	2,513	28.53	-2.94
Liberal	Peter Hill	1,975	22.42	-4.67
Total		8,809	–	
Source(s) Source: Nova Scotia Legislature (2024). "Electoral History for Kings North" (PDF). nslegislature.ca. Nova Scotia, Chief Electoral Officer (1999). Returns of the General Election for the House of Assembly, Thirty-Fifth General Election (Report). Elections Nova Scotia.

=== 1998 ===
1998 Nova Scotia general election
Party	Candidate	Votes	%	±%
Progressive Conservative	George Archibald	3,760	41.45	-1.17
New Democratic	Neil H. McNeil	2,854	31.46	15.96
Liberal	Jennifer Foster	2,457	27.09	-13.92
Total		9,071	–	
Source(s) Source: Nova Scotia Legislature (2024). "Electoral History for Kings North" (PDF). nslegislature.ca.

=== 1993 ===
1993 Nova Scotia general election
Party	Candidate	Votes	%	±%
Progressive Conservative	George Archibald	4,137	42.62	-2.80
Liberal	Jennifer Foster	3,980	41.01	4.42
New Democratic	Cameron Jess	1,505	15.51	-2.48
Natural Law	Anne Dow	84	0.87	–
Total		9,706	–	
Source(s) Source: Nova Scotia Legislature (2024). "Electoral History for Kings North" (PDF). nslegislature.ca. Nova Scotia, Chief Electoral Officer (1993). Returns of the General Election for the House of Assembly, Thirty-Third General Election (PDF) (Report). Queen's Printer. Archived from the original (PDF) on 18 June 2018.

=== 1988 ===
1988 Nova Scotia general election
Party	Candidate	Votes	%	±%
Progressive Conservative	George Archibald	3,868	45.42	-4.15
Liberal	Glenn Ells	3,116	36.59	11.39
New Democratic	Donald C. Fraser	1,532	17.99	-7.24
Total		8,516	–	
Source(s) Source: Nova Scotia Legislature (2024). "Electoral History for Kings North" (PDF). nslegislature.ca. Nova Scotia, Chief Electoral Officer (1988). Returns of the General Election for the House of Assembly, Thirty-Second General Election (PDF) (Report). Queen's Printer. Archived from the original (PDF) on 7 July 2018.

=== 1984 ===
1984 Nova Scotia general election
Party	Candidate	Votes	%	±%
Progressive Conservative	George Archibald	3,655	49.57	5.97
New Democratic	Donald C. Fraser	1,860	25.23	-4.75
Liberal	Bob Wilson	1,858	25.20	-1.22
Total		7,373	–	
Source(s) Source: Nova Scotia Legislature (2024). "Electoral History for Kings North" (PDF). nslegislature.ca. Nova Scotia, Chief Electoral Officer (1984). Returns of the General Election for the House of Assembly, Thirty-First General Election (PDF) (Report). Queen's Printer. Archived from the original (PDF) on 31 July 2017.

=== 1981 ===
1981 Nova Scotia general election
Party	Candidate	Votes	%	±%
Progressive Conservative	Edward Twohig	3,369	43.61	-5.17
New Democratic	Bob Levy	2,316	29.98	21.52
Liberal	Lennie White	2,041	26.42	-16.35
Total		7,726	–	
Source(s) Source: Nova Scotia Legislature (2024). "Electoral History for Kings North" (PDF). nslegislature.ca. Nova Scotia, Chief Electoral Officer (1981). Returns of the General Election for the House of Assembly, Thirtieth General Election (PDF) (Report). Queen's Printer. Archived from the original (PDF) on 31 July 2017.

=== 1978 ===
1978 Nova Scotia general election
Party	Candidate	Votes	%	±%
Progressive Conservative	Edward Twohig	3,744	48.78	5.14
Liberal	Glenn Ells	3,283	42.77	-6.62
New Democratic	Donald C. Fraser	649	8.45	1.47
Total		7,676	–	
Source(s) Source: Nova Scotia Legislature (2024). "Electoral History for Kings North" (PDF). nslegislature.ca. Nova Scotia, Chief Electoral Officer (1978). Returns of the General Election for the House of Assembly, Twenty-Ninth General Election (PDF) (Report). Queen's Printer. Archived from the original (PDF) on 18 June 2018.

=== 1974 ===
1974 Nova Scotia general election
Party	Candidate	Votes	%	±%
Liberal	Glenn Ells	3,536	49.39	0.63
Progressive Conservative	David J. Waterbury	3,124	43.63	-7.61
New Democratic	George W. Graves	500	6.98	–
Total		7,160	–	
Source(s) Source: Nova Scotia Legislature (2024). "Electoral History for Kings North" (PDF). nslegislature.ca. Nova Scotia, Chief Electoral Officer (1974). Returns of the General Election for the House of Assembly, Twenty-Eighth General Election (PDF) (Report). Queen's Printer. Archived from the original (PDF) on 18 June 2018.

=== 1970 ===
1970 Nova Scotia general election
Party	Candidate	Votes	%	±%
Progressive Conservative	Victor Thorpe	3,234	51.24	-4.01
Liberal	Glenn Ells	3,077	48.76	4.01
Total		6,311	–	
Source(s) Source: Nova Scotia Legislature (2024). "Electoral History for Kings North" (PDF). nslegislature.ca. Nova Scotia, Legislative Assembly (1970). Returns of the General Election for the House of Assembly, 1970 (PDF) (Report). Queen's Printer. Archived from the original (PDF) on 25 July 2018.

=== 1967 ===
1967 Nova Scotia general election
Party	Candidate	Votes	%	±%
Progressive Conservative	Victor Thorpe	3,407	55.25	-4.18
Liberal	Victor Cleyle	2,759	44.75	5.78
Total		6,166	–	
Source(s) Source: Nova Scotia Legislature (2024). "Electoral History for Kings North" (PDF). nslegislature.ca. Nova Scotia Legislature (1967). Returns of the General Election for the House of Assembly (PDF) (Report). Queen's Printer. Archived from the original (PDF) on 25 July 2018.

=== 1963 ===
1963 Nova Scotia general election
Party	Candidate	Votes	%	±%
Progressive Conservative	Gladys Porter	3,668	59.43	8.24
Liberal	David Russell Sutton	2,405	38.97	-7.57
New Democratic	George Turner	99	1.60	-0.68
Total		6,172	–	
Source(s) Source: Nova Scotia Legislature (2024). "Electoral History for Kings North" (PDF). nslegislature.ca. Nova Scotia Legislature (1963). Returns of the General Election for the House of Assembly (PDF) (Report). Queen's Printer. Archived from the original (PDF) on 25 July 2018.

=== 1960 ===
1960 Nova Scotia general election
Party	Candidate	Votes	%	±%
Progressive Conservative	Gladys Porter	3,060	51.19	1.56
Liberal	Eric Balcom	2,782	46.54	-3.83
Co-operative Commonwealth	Levitte Joseph Melanson	136	2.28	–
Total		5,978	–	
Source(s) Source: Nova Scotia Legislature (2024). "Electoral History for Kings North" (PDF). nslegislature.ca. Nova Scotia Legislature (1960). Returns of the General Election for the House of Assembly (PDF) (Report). Queen's Printer. Archived from the original (PDF) on 25 July 2018.

=== 1956 ===
1956 Nova Scotia general election
Party	Candidate	Votes	%	±%
Liberal	Eric Balcom	3,054	50.37	–
Progressive Conservative	George Arthur Boggs	3,009	49.63	–
Total		6,063	–	
Source(s) Source: Nova Scotia Legislature (2024). "Electoral History for Kings North" (PDF). nslegislature.ca. Nova Scotia Legislature (1956). Returns of the General Election for the House of Assembly (PDF) (Report). Queen's Printer. Archived from the original (PDF) on 10 September 2018.

== See also ==
- List of Nova Scotia provincial electoral districts
- Canadian provincial electoral districts
