= North Mountain (Nova Scotia) =

Mountain range in Nova Scotia, Canada

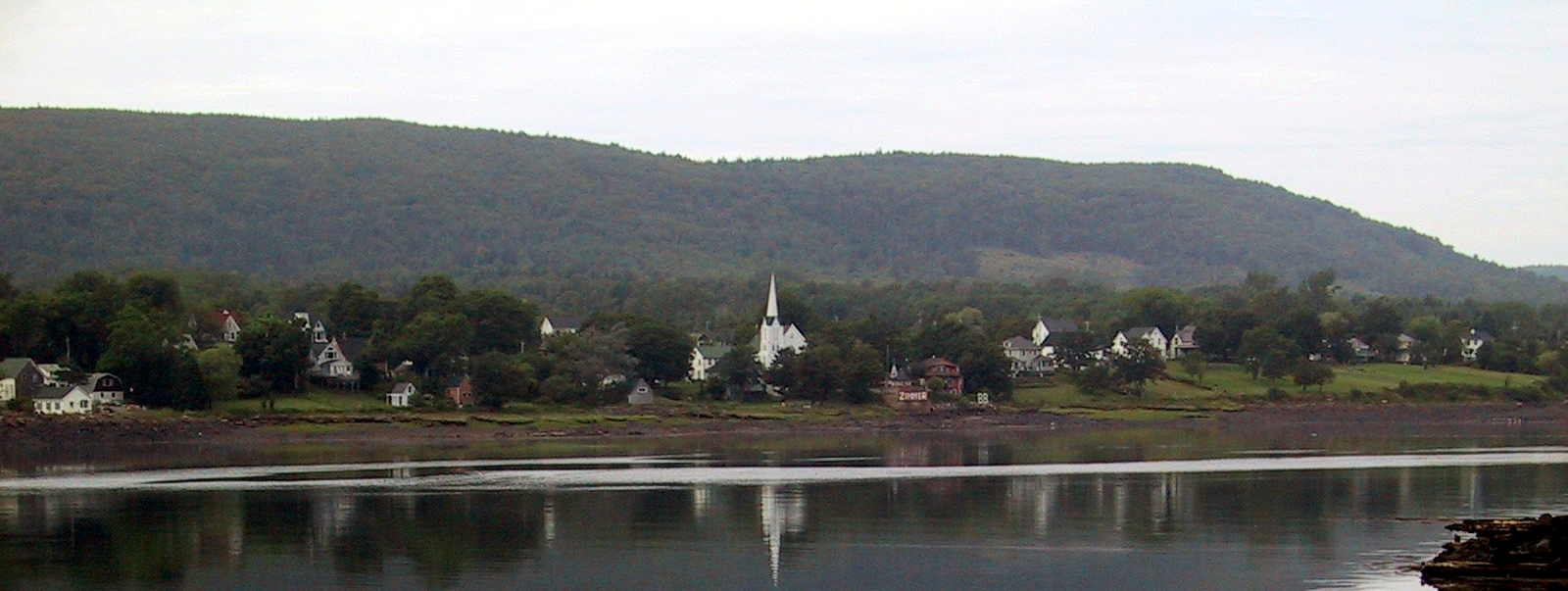
- North Mountain ridge above Granville Ferry, Nova Scotia

Highest point
- Peak: Mount Rose
- Elevation: 235 m (771 ft)
- Coordinates: 45°6′0″N 64°45′0″W

Geography
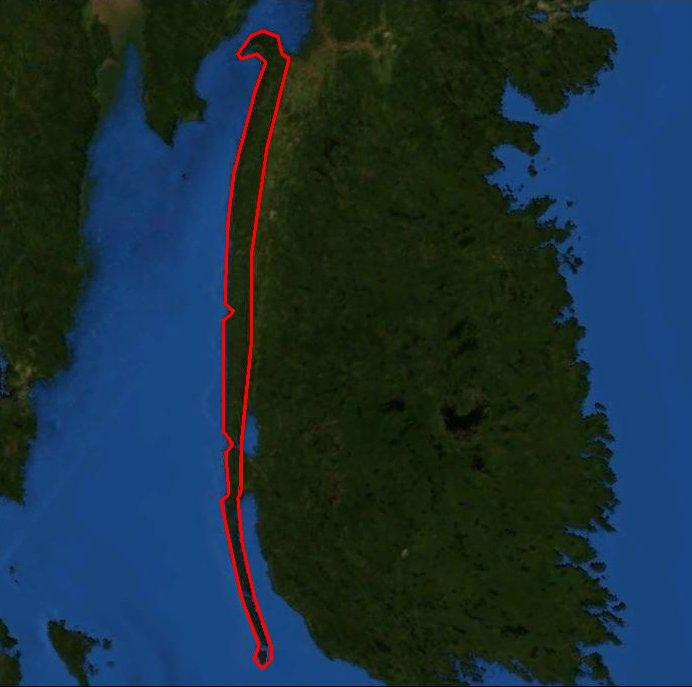
- Location of North Mountain
- Country: Canada
- Province: Nova Scotia
- Topo map(s): NTS 21A Annapolis Royal; 21B Eastport; 21H Amherst

Geology
- Rock age: Triassic
- Rock type: Igneous

Location of North Mountain Ridge on the southern shore of the Bay of Fundy

North Mountain (French: Montagne du Nord; Gaelic: Beinn a Tuath) is a narrow southwest-northeast trending volcanic ridge on the mainland portion of southwestern Nova Scotia, stretching from Brier Island to Cape Split. It forms the northern edge of the Annapolis Valley along the shore of the Bay of Fundy. Together with South Mountain, the two ranges form the Annapolis Highlands region.

North Mountain rises dramatically from the valley floor and tapers somewhat more gradually to the north and west where it meets the coast, although many parts of this coast have vertical cliffs rising higher than 30 metres, most notably at Cape Split. A break occurs at Digby Gut where a gap in the mountain ridge is filled by a deep tidal channel separating the eastern end of the mountain from Digby Neck.

The highest point on the ridge is at Mount Rose in Annapolis County, north of Lawrencetown.

== Geology ==
The ridge traces its history to the Triassic period when this part of Nova Scotia occupied the center of the supercontinent Pangaea. It is a 201 million year old sequence of tholeiitic basalts, which contains columnar jointing. The basalts also extend under the Bay of Fundy and parts of it are exposed on the shore at Five Islands, east of Parrsboro on the north side of the bay. Numerous sediment-filled fissures are present near the upper surface of North Mountain. The hard ridge of basalt resisted the grinding of ice sheets that flowed over the region during past ice ages, and now forms one side of the Annapolis Valley in western part of the Nova Scotia peninsula.

North Mountain is believed to have formed during the opening of the Atlantic Ocean. It is a portion of the Central Atlantic Magmatic Province, which is a gigantic flood basalt and intrusive complex along east coast of the United States, Europe, northwest Africa and South America with a diameter of 4,000 kilometres (2,490 mi).

A viscous (<175 m) North Mountain flow at McKay Head shows ~25-cm-thick distinguished layers separated by ~130 cm (51 in) of basalt in its upper 34 m (112 ft). Upper layers (5 metres below the lava top) are extremely vesicular while lower ones are pegmatitic and include a narrow (~2 cm) rhyolite band. The layering of the flow closely resemble that of some Hawaiian lava lakes.

Columnar basalt may be seen at Baxters Harbour and at Brier Island.

=== Soil development ===
Soils developed on North Mountain basalt tend to be shallow, stony but well-structured sandy loam in the podzol or gleysol great soil groups. They are mapped as Rossway, Roxville and Tiddville series.

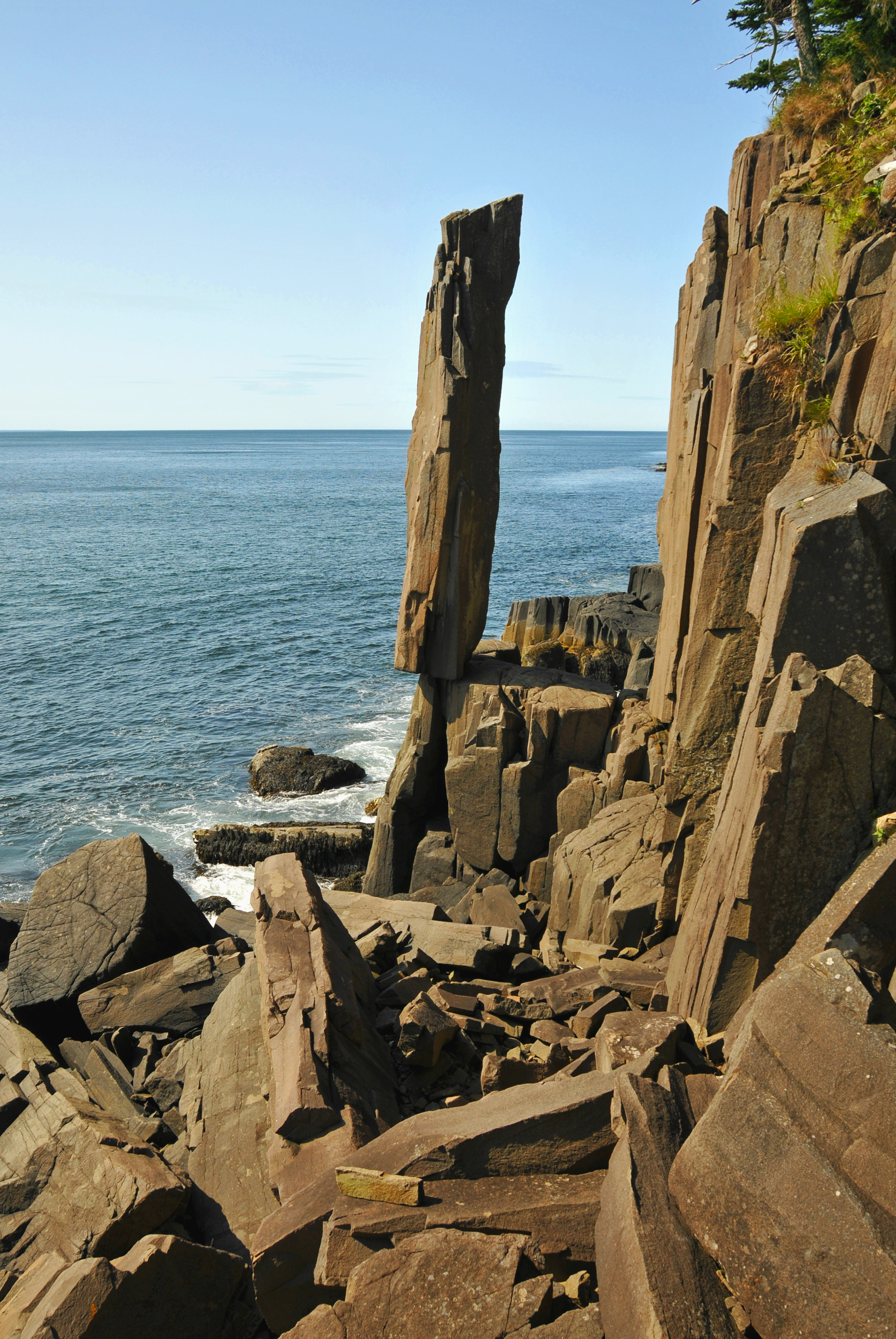
The Balancing Rock, a columnar basalt fragment of the North Mountain near Digby, Nova Scotia.

Basal contact of a lava flow section of Fundy basin

== See also ==
- South Mountain (Nova Scotia)
- Volcanism of Canada
- Volcanism of Eastern Canada
- Fundy Basin
- Geography of Nova Scotia
- List of highest points of Canadian provinces and territories
