= Ross Corner =

Ross Corner may refer to:

- Ross Corner, New Jersey
- Ross Corner, Nova Scotia

== See also ==
- Ross Corners, New York
