= Mark Parent =

Canadian politician

The Honourable Mark Parent ECNS

Member of the Nova Scotia House of Assembly for Kings North
- In office July 27, 1999 – June 9, 2009
- Preceded by: George Archibald
- Succeeded by: Jim Morton

Minister of Environment and Labour
- In office June 26, 2006 – April 24, 2008
- Premier: Rodney MacDonald
- Preceded by: Carolyn Bolivar-Getson
- Succeeded by: David Morse

Minister of the Environment
- In office April 24, 2008 – January 8, 2009
- Premier: Rodney MacDonald
- Preceded by: Ministry Created
- Succeeded by: Sterling Belliveau

Minister of Labour and Workplace Development
- In office April 24, 2008 – January 8, 2009
- Premier: Rodney MacDonald
- Preceded by: Ministry Created
- Succeeded by: Marilyn More

Minister of Agriculture
- In office January 8, 2009 – June 9, 2009
- Premier: Rodney MacDonald
- Preceded by: Brooke Taylor
- Succeeded by: John MacDonell

Personal details
- Born: August 25, 1954 (age 71) Port Williams, Nova Scotia
- Party: Progressive Conservative
- Spouse(s): Cathy; Margie Jenkins
- Occupation: Pastor

Mark Parent (born August 25, 1954) is a Canadian clergyman, author, academic, and former politician in Nova Scotia.

Parent is the son of Baptist missionaries Hazen Coles Parent and Hazel Mildred Anderson. Parent was raised in Bolivia, South America before returning to Canada for post secondary studies. He holds a Bachelor of Arts degree from York University, a Master of Divinity from Acadia Divinity College, and a Doctor of Philosophy from McGill University.

Parent served in various churches in Ontario, New Brunswick and Nova Scotia before returning home in 1994 to serve as pastor of the Pereaux United Baptist Church. During the late 1990s he was an associate professor of Religious Studies at Mount Allison University.

== Political career ==
"Politics is the art of doing the impossible, with the unwilling, for the ungrateful."

— Mark Parent
The Daily News
October 2, 1999

In 1997, Parent volunteered as the Policy Chair for the Progressive Conservative Party of Nova Scotia.

In 1999 Parent successfully ran for the Progressive Conservative nomination in the riding of Kings North. He was elected in the 1999 provincial election with 49.05% of the vote.

As a legislator, Parent became known for speaking frankly both in the House of Assembly and to the media, and expressed dissatisfaction with how the legislature conducted its business.

Parent was re-elected in the 2003 provincial election with 50.2%. In the 2006 election, Parent was re-elected with 50.07%.

In 2006 Parent was appointed to the Executive Council of Nova Scotia where he served as Minister of Environment and Labour. While Minister, Parent oversaw the division of the Department of Environment and Labour into two portfolios in April 2008, consisting of a separate Department of Environment and a separate Department of Labour and Workforce Development. Parent served as Minister for those portfolios until January 2009, when he was appointed Minister of Agriculture, just days before he was to release Nova Scotia's climate change plan. During his time in cabinet, Parent was also responsible for Part II of the Gambling Control Act, the Workers' Compensation Act (except Part II) and the Apprenticeship and Trades Qualifications Act.

Parent was defeated in the 2009 provincial election, with 36.08% of the vote in his riding.

== Electoral record ==
=== Federal ===
2021 Canadian federal election: Kings—Hants
Party	Candidate	Votes	%	±%	Expenditures
Liberal	Kody Blois	20,192	44.92	+1.61	$80,518.90
Conservative	Mark Parent	13,234	29.44	+4.66	$54,740.13
New Democratic	Stephen Schneider	8,645	19.23	+2.05	$13,834.66
People's	Steven Ford	1,945	4.33	+2.69	$0.00
Green	Sheila G. Richardson	940	2.09	-10.46	$4,644.16
Total valid votes/expense limit		44,956	100.00	–	$107,126.60
Total rejected ballots		251			
Turnout		45,207	63.42	-5.34	
Registered voters		71,285			
Liberal hold		Swing		-1.53	
Source: Elections Canada

=== Provincial ===
2009 Nova Scotia general election
Party	Candidate	Votes	%	±%
New Democrat	Jim Morton	3,535	41.43	
Progressive Conservative	Mark Parent	3,079	36.08	
Liberal	Shirley Fisher	1,541	18.06	
Green	Anna-Maria Galante-Ward	378	4.43	–

2006 Nova Scotia general election
Party	Candidate	Votes	%
Progressive Conservative	Mark Parent	4153	50.07
New Democrat	Jim Morton	2190	26.40
Liberal	Madonna Spinazola	1757	21.18
Green	Chris Alders	195	2.35

2003 Nova Scotia general election
Party	Candidate	Votes	%	±%
Progressive Conservative	Mark Parent	4063	50.2	
New Democrat	Jim Morton	2340	29.91	
Liberal	Michael Landry	1533	18.94	
Marijuana	Ben "Budman" Friesen	157	1.94	

1999 Nova Scotia general election
Party	Candidate	Votes	%	±%
Progressive Conservative	Mark Parent	4321	49.05	
New Democrat	Neil H. McNeil	2513	28.53	
Liberal	Peter Hill	1975	22.42	

== Bibliography ==
- Parent, Mark (1998). Spiritscapes. Northstone. ISBN 3-540-63293-X.
- Parent, Mark (17 October 2009). "Health care system must change or collapse". The Chronicle Herald. Archived from the original on 20 November 2009.
