= Ramona Jennex =

Canadian educator and politician

The Honourable Ramona Jennex ECNS

Member of the Nova Scotia House of Assembly for Kings South
- In office June 9, 2009 – October 8, 2013
- Preceded by: David Morse
- Succeeded by: Keith Irving

Minister of Service Nova Scotia and Municipal Relations
- In office June 19, 2009 – January 11, 2011
- Preceded by: Richard Hurlburt
- Succeeded by: John MacDonell

Minister of Emergency Management
- In office June 19, 2009 – January 11, 2011
- Preceded by: David Morse
- Succeeded by: Ross Landry

Minister of Immigration
- In office June 19, 2009 – January 11, 2011
- Preceded by: Len Goucher
- Succeeded by: Marilyn More

Personal details
- Born: 1955 (age 70–71) Halifax, Nova Scotia
- Party: New Democrat
- Occupation: Politician

Ramona Jennex (born 1955) is a Canadian politician from the province of Nova Scotia.

== Political career ==
Jennex ran for the Nova Scotia New Democratic Party nomination in the riding of Kings South in 2009. She was elected in the 2009 provincial election and represented that riding in the legislature until her defeat in the 2013 provincial election.

On June 19, 2009, Jennex was appointed to the Executive Council of Nova Scotia as Minister of Service Nova Scotia and Municipal Relations, Minister of Emergency Management, Minister of Immigration, and Minister of Youth. On January 11, 2011, Jennex was appointed Minister of Education and Early Childhood Development, and the Minister responsible for Youth.

Jennex sought re-election in King's South in the 2024 Nova Scotia general election and lost to Progressive Conservative Julie Vanexan.

=== Position history ===
- Minister of Education and Early Childhood Development (April 4, 2013 – October 22, 2013)
- Minister responsible for Youth (June 19, 2009 – October 22, 2013)
- Minister of Education (January 11, 2011 – April 4, 2013)
- Minister of Service Nova Scotia and Municipal Relations (June 19, 2009 – January 11, 2011)
- Minister of Emergency Management (June 19, 2009 – January 11, 2011)
- Minister of Immigration (June 19, 2009 – January 11, 2011)
- Minister responsible for the Residential Tenancies Act (June 19, 2009 – January 11, 2011)

== Electoral record ==
2024 Nova Scotia general election: Kings South
Party	Candidate	Votes	%	±%
Progressive Conservative	Julie Vanexan	3,372	41.77	+8.59
New Democratic	Ramona Jennex	2,326	28.82	+9.12
Liberal	Mike Hamm	2,230	27.63	-16.49
Green	Sheila G. Richardson	144	1.78	-1.22
Total valid votes		8,072		
Total rejected ballots		35		
Turnout		8,109	45.89	
Eligible voters		17,671		
Progressive Conservative gain		Swing		
Source: Elections Nova Scotia

2013 Nova Scotia general election: Kings South
Party	Candidate	Votes	%	±%
Liberal	Keith Irving	3,939	39.25	+12.34
New Democratic	Ramona Jennex	3,568	35.55	-5.63
Progressive Conservative	Shane MacKenzie Buchan	2,278	22.70	-5.44
Green	Shelia G. Richardson	251	2.50	-1.26
Total		10,036		

2009 Nova Scotia general election: Kings South
Party	Candidate	Votes	%	±%
New Democratic	Ramona Jennex	4,038	41.18	6.18
Progressive Conservative	David Morse	2,759	28.14	-14.23
Liberal	Paula Howatt	2,639	26.91	6.82
Green	Brendan MacNeill	369	3.76	1.24
Total		9,805	–	
Source(s) Source: Nova Scotia Legislature (2021). "Electoral History for Kings South" (PDF). nslegislature.ca.
