= Kings South =

Provincial electoral district in Nova Scotia, Canada

Coordinates: 45.040°N 64.458°W

Nova Scotia electoral district

Provincial electoral district
- Legislature: Nova Scotia House of Assembly
MLA
Julie Vanexan
Progressive Conservative
- District created: 1956
- First contested: 1956
- Last contested: 2024

Demographics
- Population (2011): 21,252
- Electors: 17,377
- Area (km²): 576
- Pop. density (per km²): 36.9
- Census division: Kings County

Kings South is a provincial electoral district in Nova Scotia, Canada, that elects one member of the Nova Scotia House of Assembly. It includes the town of Wolfville, the village of New Minas, the community of Coldbrook, and Glooscap First Nation.

== Geography ==
Kings South has a landmass of 576 km^{2} (222 sq mi).

== Members of the Legislative Assembly ==
This riding has elected the following members of the Legislative Assembly:

Kings South
Legislature	Years	Member	Party
Riding created from Kings
46th	1956–1960	Edward Haliburton	Progressive Conservative
47th	1960–1963	Edward Haliburton	Progressive Conservative
48th	1963–1967	Edward Haliburton	Progressive Conservative
49th	1967–1970	Edward Haliburton	Progressive Conservative
50th	1970–1974	Harry How	Progressive Conservative
51st	1974–1978	Harry How	Progressive Conservative
52nd	1978–1981	Harry How	Progressive Conservative
53rd	1981–1984	Harry How	Progressive Conservative
53rd	1984–1984	Paul Kinsman	Progressive Conservative
54th	1984–1988	Bob Levy	New Democratic
55th	1988–1993	Derrick Kimball	Progressive Conservative
56th	1993–1998	Robbie Harrison	Liberal
57th	1998–1999	Robbie Harrison	Liberal
58th	1999–2003	David Morse	Progressive Conservative
59th	2003–2005	David Morse	Progressive Conservative
60th	2006–2009	David Morse	Progressive Conservative
61st	2009–2013	Ramona Jennex	New Democratic
62nd	2013–2017	Keith Irving	Liberal
63rd	2017–2021	Keith Irving	Liberal
64th	2021–2024	Keith Irving	Liberal
65th	2024–present	Julie Vanexan	Progressive Conservative

== Election results ==
=== 2024 ===
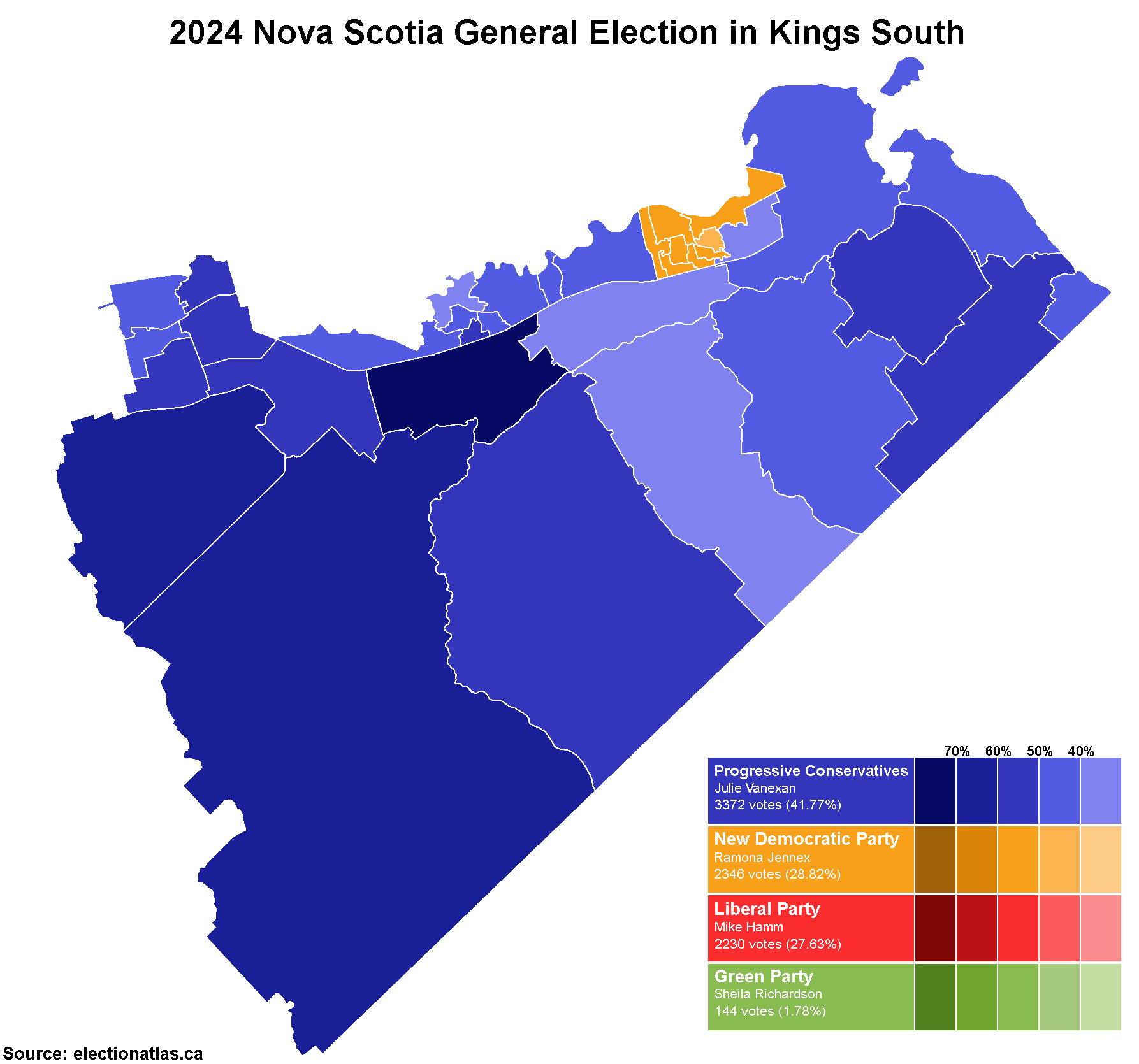
Poll-by-poll results of the 2024 Nova Scotia General Election in Kings South.

2024 Nova Scotia general election
Party	Candidate	Votes	%	±%
Progressive Conservative	Julie Vanexan	3,372	41.77	+8.59
New Democratic	Ramona Jennex	2,326	28.82	+9.12
Liberal	Mike Hamm	2,230	27.63	-16.49
Green	Sheila G. Richardson	144	1.78	-1.22
Total valid votes		8,072		
Total rejected ballots		35		
Turnout		8,109	45.89	
Eligible voters		17,671		
Progressive Conservative gain		Swing		
Source: Elections Nova Scotia

=== 2021 ===
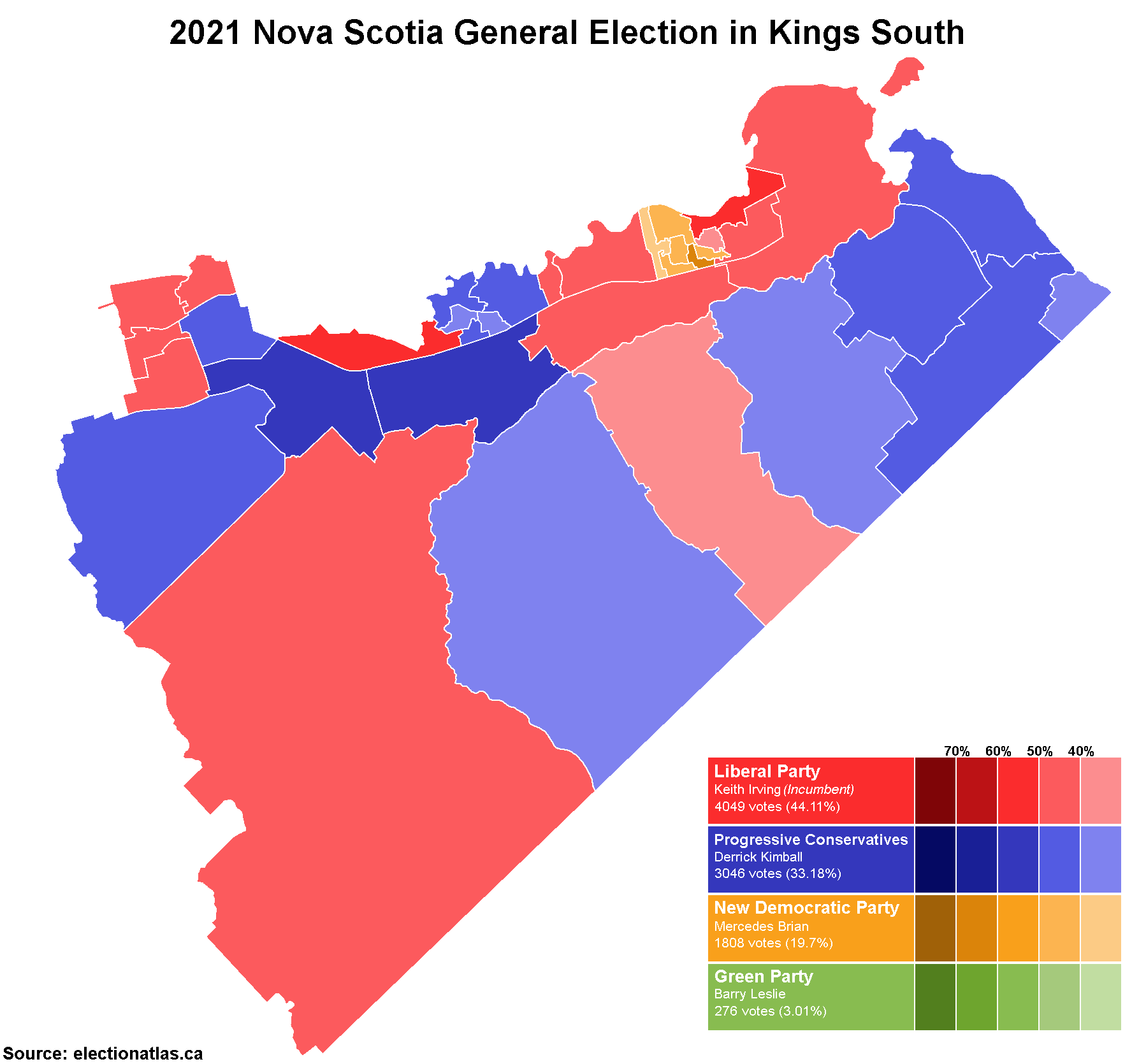
Poll-by-poll results of the 2021 Nova Scotia General Election in Kings South

2021 Nova Scotia general election
Party	Candidate	Votes	%	±%	Expenditures
Liberal	Keith Irving	4,049	44.11	-2.48	$40,527.47
Progressive Conservative	Derrick Kimball	3,046	33.18	+6.21	$68,832.87
New Democratic	Mercedes Brian	1,808	19.70	-1.84	$54,103.54
Green	Barry Leslie	276	3.01	-0.75	$1,669.27
Total valid votes/expense limit		9,179	99.70	–	$94,818.40
Total rejected ballots		28	0.30		
Turnout		9,207	55.20		
Eligible voters		16,680			
Liberal hold		Swing		-4.35	
Source: Elections Nova Scotia

=== 2017 ===
2017 provincial election redistributed results
Party	Vote	%
Liberal	3,902	46.59
Progressive Conservative	2,259	26.97
New Democratic	1,804	21.54
Green	315	3.76
Atlantica	95	1.13

2017 Nova Scotia general election
Party	Candidate	Votes	%	±%
Liberal	Keith Irving	4,269	46.71	+7.46
Progressive Conservative	Peter Harrison	2,496	27.31	+4.61
New Democratic	Steve Schneider	1,921	21.02	-14.53
Green	Sheila Richardson	337	3.69	-0.07
Atlantica	Joel Hirtle	116	1.27	
Total valid votes		9,139	100	
Total rejected ballots		29	0.32	
Turnout		9,168	52.76	
Eligible voters		17,377		
Liberal hold		Swing		+1.43
Source: Elections Nova Scotia

=== 2013 ===
2013 Nova Scotia general election
Party	Candidate	Votes	%	±%
Liberal	Keith Irving	3,878	39.16	12.24
New Democratic	Ramona Jennex	3,511	35.45	-5.73
Progressive Conservative	Shane Buchan	2,263	22.85	-5.29
Green	Sheila G. Richardson	252	2.54	-1.22
Total		9,904	–	
Source(s) Source: Nova Scotia Legislature (2024). "Electoral History for Kings South" (PDF). nslegislature.ca. Nova Scotia, Chief Electoral Officer (2013). 39th Provincial General Election, October 8, 2013: Volume 1 – Statement of Votes & Statistics (PDF) (Report). Elections Nova Scotia. Archived from the original (PDF) on 10 April 2018.

=== 2009 ===
2009 Nova Scotia general election
Party	Candidate	Votes	%	±%
New Democratic	Ramona Jennex	4,038	41.18	6.18
Progressive Conservative	David Morse	2,759	28.14	-14.72
Liberal	Paula Kinley Howatt	2,639	26.91	7.31
Green	Brendan MacNeill	369	3.76	1.24
Total		9,805	–	
Source(s) Source: Nova Scotia Legislature (2024). "Electoral History for Kings South" (PDF). nslegislature.ca.

=== 2006 ===
2006 Nova Scotia general election
Party	Candidate	Votes	%	±%
Progressive Conservative	David Morse	3,832	42.86	5.21
New Democratic	David Mangle	3,130	35.01	3.58
Liberal	Ray Savage	1,753	19.61	-10.56
Green	Steve McGowan	226	2.53	–
Total		8,941	–	
Source(s) Source: Nova Scotia Legislature (2024). "Electoral History for Kings South" (PDF). nslegislature.ca.

=== 2003 ===
2003 Nova Scotia general election
Party	Candidate	Votes	%	±%
Progressive Conservative	David Morse	3,347	37.65	-2.58
New Democratic	David Mangle	2,794	31.43	4.88
Liberal	Maura Ryan	2,682	30.17	-3.06
Nova Scotia Party	Victor Harris	67	0.75	–
Total		8,890	–	
Source(s) Source: Nova Scotia Legislature (2024). "Electoral History for Kings South" (PDF). nslegislature.ca.

=== 1999 ===
1999 Nova Scotia general election
Party	Candidate	Votes	%	±%
Progressive Conservative	David Morse	3,890	40.23	9.57
Liberal	Robbie Harrison	3,213	33.23	-3.23
New Democratic	Mary DeWolfe	2,567	26.55	-6.34
Total		9,670	–	
Source(s) Source: Nova Scotia Legislature (2024). "Electoral History for Kings South" (PDF). nslegislature.ca. Nova Scotia, Chief Electoral Officer (1999). Returns of the General Election for the House of Assembly, Thirty-Fifth General Election (Report). Elections Nova Scotia.

=== 1998 ===
1998 Nova Scotia general election
Party	Candidate	Votes	%	±%
Liberal	Robbie Harrison	3,650	36.46	7.00
New Democratic	Mary DeWolfe	3,292	32.88	13.07
Progressive Conservative	David Morse	3,069	30.66	2.42
Total		10,011	–	
Source(s) Source: Nova Scotia Legislature (2024). "Electoral History for Kings South" (PDF). nslegislature.ca.

=== 1993 ===
1993 Nova Scotia general election
Party	Candidate	Votes	%	±%
Liberal	Robbie Harrison	3,069	29.46	8.91
Progressive Conservative	Harry How	2,941	28.24	-14.20
Independent	Derrick Kimball	2,240	21.51	–
New Democratic	Steve Mattson	2,064	19.82	-17.19
Natural Law	Peter Cameron	102	0.98	–
Total		10,416	–	
Source(s) Source: Nova Scotia Legislature (2024). "Electoral History for Kings South" (PDF). nslegislature.ca. Nova Scotia, Chief Electoral Officer (1993). Returns of the General Election for the House of Assembly, Thirty-Third General Election (PDF) (Report). Queen's Printer. Archived from the original (PDF) on 18 June 2018.

=== 1988 ===
1988 Nova Scotia general election
Party	Candidate	Votes	%	±%
Progressive Conservative	Derrick Kimball	3,531	42.44	-2.87
New Democratic	Steve Mattson	3,079	37.01	-8.56
Liberal	Perry Wallace	1,710	20.55	12.84
Total		8,320	–	
Source(s) Source: Nova Scotia Legislature (2024). "Electoral History for Kings South" (PDF). nslegislature.ca. Nova Scotia, Chief Electoral Officer (1988). Returns of the General Election for the House of Assembly, Thirty-Second General Election (PDF) (Report). Queen's Printer. Archived from the original (PDF) on 7 July 2018.

=== 1984 ===
1984 Nova Scotia general election
Party	Candidate	Votes	%	±%
New Democratic	Bob Levy	3,694	45.57	11.04
Progressive Conservative	Paul Kinsman	3,673	45.31	-1.50
Liberal	Alan Sponagle	625	7.71	-10.95
Independent	Doug Milligan	114	1.41	–
Total		8,106	–	
Source(s) Source: Nova Scotia Legislature (2024). "Electoral History for Kings South" (PDF). nslegislature.ca. Nova Scotia, Chief Electoral Officer (1984). Returns of the General Election for the House of Assembly, Thirty-First General Election (PDF) (Report). Queen's Printer. Archived from the original (PDF) on 31 July 2017.

=== 1984 by-election ===
Nova Scotia provincial by-election, 1984-02-12
Party	Candidate	Votes	%	±%
Progressive Conservative	Paul Kinsman	3,497	46.81	-18.67
New Democratic	Bob Levy	2,580	34.53	14.03
Liberal	Henry Hicks	1,394	18.66	4.64
Total		7,471	–	
Source(s) Source: Nova Scotia Legislature (2024). "Electoral History for Kings South" (PDF). nslegislature.ca. Nova Scotia, Chief Electoral Officer (1984). Returns of the General Election for the House of Assembly, Thirty-First General Election (PDF) (Report). Queen's Printer. Archived from the original (PDF) on 31 July 2017.

=== 1981 ===
1981 Nova Scotia general election
Party	Candidate	Votes	%	±%
Progressive Conservative	Harry How	4,356	65.47	2.90
New Democratic	Evelyn Garbary	1,364	20.50	5.74
Liberal	Betty Deal	933	14.02	-8.64
Total		6,653	–	
Source(s) Source: Nova Scotia Legislature (2024). "Electoral History for Kings South" (PDF). nslegislature.ca. Nova Scotia, Chief Electoral Officer (1981). Returns of the General Election for the House of Assembly, Thirtieth General Election (PDF) (Report). Queen's Printer. Archived from the original (PDF) on 31 July 2017.

=== 1978 ===
1978 Nova Scotia general election
Party	Candidate	Votes	%	±%
Progressive Conservative	Harry How	4,214	62.58	3.35
Liberal	Wilbur H. Starratt	1,526	22.66	-10.45
New Democratic	Donald F. Archibald	994	14.76	7.09
Total		6,734	–	
Source(s) Source: Nova Scotia Legislature (2024). "Electoral History for Kings South" (PDF). nslegislature.ca. Nova Scotia, Chief Electoral Officer (1978). Returns of the General Election for the House of Assembly, Twenty-Ninth General Election (PDF) (Report). Queen's Printer. Archived from the original (PDF) on 18 June 2018.

=== 1974 ===
1974 Nova Scotia general election
Party	Candidate	Votes	%	±%
Progressive Conservative	Harry How	3,576	59.22	1.68
Liberal	Edgar K. Aston	1,999	33.11	-9.35
New Democratic	John P. O'Meara	463	7.67	–
Total		6,038	–	
Source(s) Source: Nova Scotia Legislature (2024). "Electoral History for Kings South" (PDF). nslegislature.ca. Nova Scotia, Chief Electoral Officer (1974). Returns of the General Election for the House of Assembly, Twenty-Eighth General Election (PDF) (Report). Queen's Printer. Archived from the original (PDF) on 18 June 2018.

=== 1970 ===
1970 Nova Scotia general election
Party	Candidate	Votes	%	±%
Progressive Conservative	Harry How	2,722	57.55	-5.34
Liberal	Edgar K. Aston	2,008	42.45	5.34
Total		4,730	–	
Source(s) Source: Nova Scotia Legislature (2024). "Electoral History for Kings South" (PDF). nslegislature.ca. Nova Scotia, Legislative Assembly (1970). Returns of the General Election for the House of Assembly, 1970 (PDF) (Report). Queen's Printer. Archived from the original (PDF) on 25 July 2018.

=== 1967 ===
1967 Nova Scotia general election
Party	Candidate	Votes	%	±%
Progressive Conservative	Edward Haliburton	2,515	62.89	-1.54
Liberal	Bruce Trenholm	1,484	37.11	1.54
Total		3,999	–	
Source(s) Source: Nova Scotia Legislature (2024). "Electoral History for Kings South" (PDF). nslegislature.ca. Nova Scotia Legislature (1967). Returns of the General Election for the House of Assembly (PDF) (Report). Queen's Printer. Archived from the original (PDF) on 25 July 2018.

=== 1963 ===
1963 Nova Scotia general election
Party	Candidate	Votes	%	±%
Progressive Conservative	Edward Haliburton	2,505	64.43	7.14
Liberal	Bruce Trenholm	1,383	35.57	-2.36
Total		3,888	–	
Source(s) Source: Nova Scotia Legislature (2024). "Electoral History for Kings South" (PDF). nslegislature.ca. Nova Scotia Legislature (1963). Returns of the General Election for the House of Assembly (PDF) (Report). Queen's Printer. Archived from the original (PDF) on 25 July 2018.

=== 1960 ===
1960 Nova Scotia general election
Party	Candidate	Votes	%	±%
Progressive Conservative	Edward Haliburton	2,388	57.29	-2.47
Liberal	Bruce Trenholm	1,581	37.93	-2.30
Co-operative Commonwealth	George R. Goucher	199	4.77	–
Total		4,168	–	
Source(s) Source: Nova Scotia Legislature (2024). "Electoral History for Kings South" (PDF). nslegislature.ca. Nova Scotia Legislature (1960). Returns of the General Election for the House of Assembly (PDF) (Report). Queen's Printer. Archived from the original (PDF) on 25 July 2018.

=== 1956 ===
1956 Nova Scotia general election
Party	Candidate	Votes	%	±%
Progressive Conservative	Edward Haliburton	2,368	59.77	–
Liberal	MacIntosh MacLeod	1,594	40.23	–
Total		3,962	–	
Source(s) Source: Nova Scotia Legislature (2024). "Electoral History for Kings South" (PDF). nslegislature.ca. Nova Scotia Legislature (1956). Returns of the General Election for the House of Assembly (PDF) (Report). Queen's Printer. Archived from the original (PDF) on 10 September 2018.

== See also ==
- List of Nova Scotia provincial electoral districts
- Canadian provincial electoral districts
