= Julie Vanexan =

Canadian politician

Member of the Nova Scotia House of Assembly for Kings South
- Incumbent
- Assumed office November 26, 2024
- Preceded by: Keith Irving

Personal details
- Political party: Progressive Conservative Association of Nova Scotia

Julie Vanexan is a Canadian politician who was elected to the Nova Scotia House of Assembly in the 2024 general election, representing Kings South as a member of the Progressive Conservative Association of Nova Scotia.

Prior to entering politics she worked for a software company.

== Electoral record ==
2024 Nova Scotia general election: Kings South
Party	Candidate	Votes	%	±%
Progressive Conservative	Julie Vanexan	3,296	41.7%	+8.52
New Democratic	Ramona Jennex	2,289	28.9%	+9.20
Liberal	Mike Hamm	2,183	27.6%	-16.51
Green	Sheila Richardson	144	1.8%	-1.21
Total valid votes				
Total rejected ballots				
Turnout		7,912		
Eligible voters				
Progressive Conservative gain from Liberal		Swing		+10%
Source: Elections Nova Scotia
