= Victor Thorpe =

Canadian politician

Victor Thorpe MLA
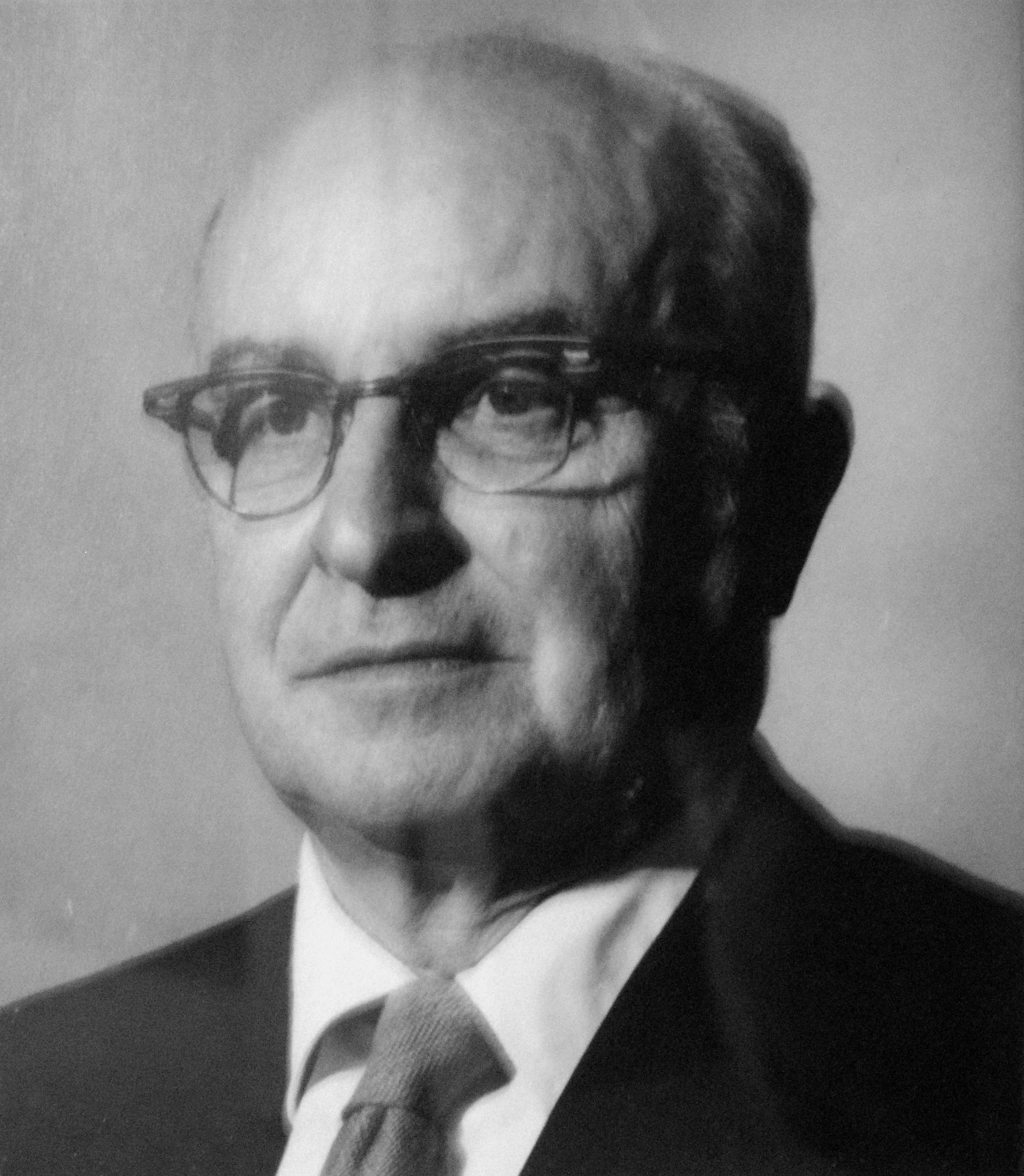

MLA for Kings North
- In office 1967–1974
- Preceded by: Gladys Porter
- Succeeded by: Glenn Ells

Personal details
- Born: June 18, 1912 Centreville, Nova Scotia
- Died: 1985 (aged 72–73)
- Party: Progressive Conservative

Victor Newcombe Thorpe was a Member of the Legislative Assembly of Nova Scotia, Canada for the constituency of Kings North. He sat as a member of the Progressive Conservative Party of Nova Scotia from 1967 to 1974.

Thorpe was born in Centreville, Nova Scotia. He was elected in 1967, and was re-elected in 1970. He did not re-offer in 1974.
