= John Lohr =

Canadian politician

The Honourable John Lohr ECNS MLA
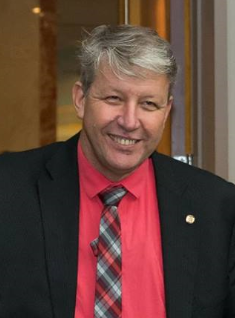

Member of the Nova Scotia House of Assembly for Kings North
- Incumbent
- Assumed office October 8, 2013
- Preceded by: Jim Morton

Personal details
- Born: February 21, 1961 (age 65) Canning, Nova Scotia
- Party: Progressive Conservative
- Occupation: Farmer

John Abraham Lohr (born February 21, 1961) is a Canadian politician who was elected to the Nova Scotia House of Assembly in the 2013 provincial election. A member of the Progressive Conservative Party of Nova Scotia, he represents the electoral district of Kings North.

== Early life ==
Lohr was born in Nova Scotia to first-generation Dutch immigrants who arrived in Canada at Halifax's Pier 21 in 1958.

== Business career ==
In 1987, Lohr purchased his father's farm and developed it into a multi-faceted agri-business which grew numerous fruits and vegetables. In 1999, Lohr purchased and rebranded a spice processing company, Farmer John's Herbs and in 2017, he sold the farm and the spice company to his two oldest sons.

== Political career ==
Lohr was elected to the Nova Scotia House of Assembly in the 2013 provincial election. He was re-elected in the 2017 provincial election and again in the 2021 election.

On January 8, 2018, Lohr announced his candidacy for the leadership of the Progressive Conservative Party of Nova Scotia. He finished in third place.

On August 31, 2021, Lohr was made the Minister of Municipal Affairs and Housing, as well as Minister responsible for the Emergency Management Office and Military Relations.

== Electoral record ==
2024 Nova Scotia general election: Kings North
Party	Candidate	Votes	%	±%
Progressive Conservative	John Lohr	4,047	53.67	+8.96
New Democratic	Gillian Yorke	2,095	27.78	+6.66
Liberal	Richelle Brown Redden	1,260	16.71	-12.58
Green	Dave Lowe	139	1.84	-2.56
Total valid votes		7,541		
Total rejected ballots		33		
Turnout		7,575	44.17	
Eligible voters		17,151		
Progressive Conservative hold		Swing		
Source: Elections Nova Scotia

2021 Nova Scotia general election: Kings North
Party	Candidate	Votes	%	±%	Expenditures
Progressive Conservative	John Lohr	3,971	44.70	-1.24	$45,336.80
Liberal	Geof Turner	2,602	29.29	-4.17	$44,819.91
New Democratic	Erin Patterson	1,876	21.12	+4.93	$45,345.49
Green	Doug Hickman	391	4.40	+0.86	$16,083.69
Atlantica	Paul Dunn	43	0.48	-0.38	$200.00
Total valid votes/expense limit		8,833	99.69	–	$92,838.34
Total rejected ballots		28	0.31		
Turnout		8,911	55.30		
Eligible voters		16,115			
Progressive Conservative hold		Swing		+1.47	
Source: Elections Nova Scotia

2017 Nova Scotia general election
Party	Candidate	Votes	%	±%
Progressive Conservative	John Lohr	3,823	45.94	+13.45
Liberal	Geof Turner	2,784	33.46	+2.26
New Democratic	Ted Champion	1,347	16.19	-16.07
Green	Mary Lou Harley	295	3.54	-0.51
Atlantica	Bryden Deadder	72	0.86	N/A
Total valid votes		8,321	100.0	
Total rejected ballots		32	0.38	
Turnout		8,353	52.71	
Eligible voters		15,848		

2013 Nova Scotia general election
Party	Candidate	Votes	%	±%
Progressive Conservative	John Lohr	2903	32.49	
New Democrat	Jim Morton	2882	32.26	
Liberal	Stephen Wayne Pearl	2787	30.99	
