= South Mountain (Nova Scotia) =

Mountain in Nova Scotia, Canada

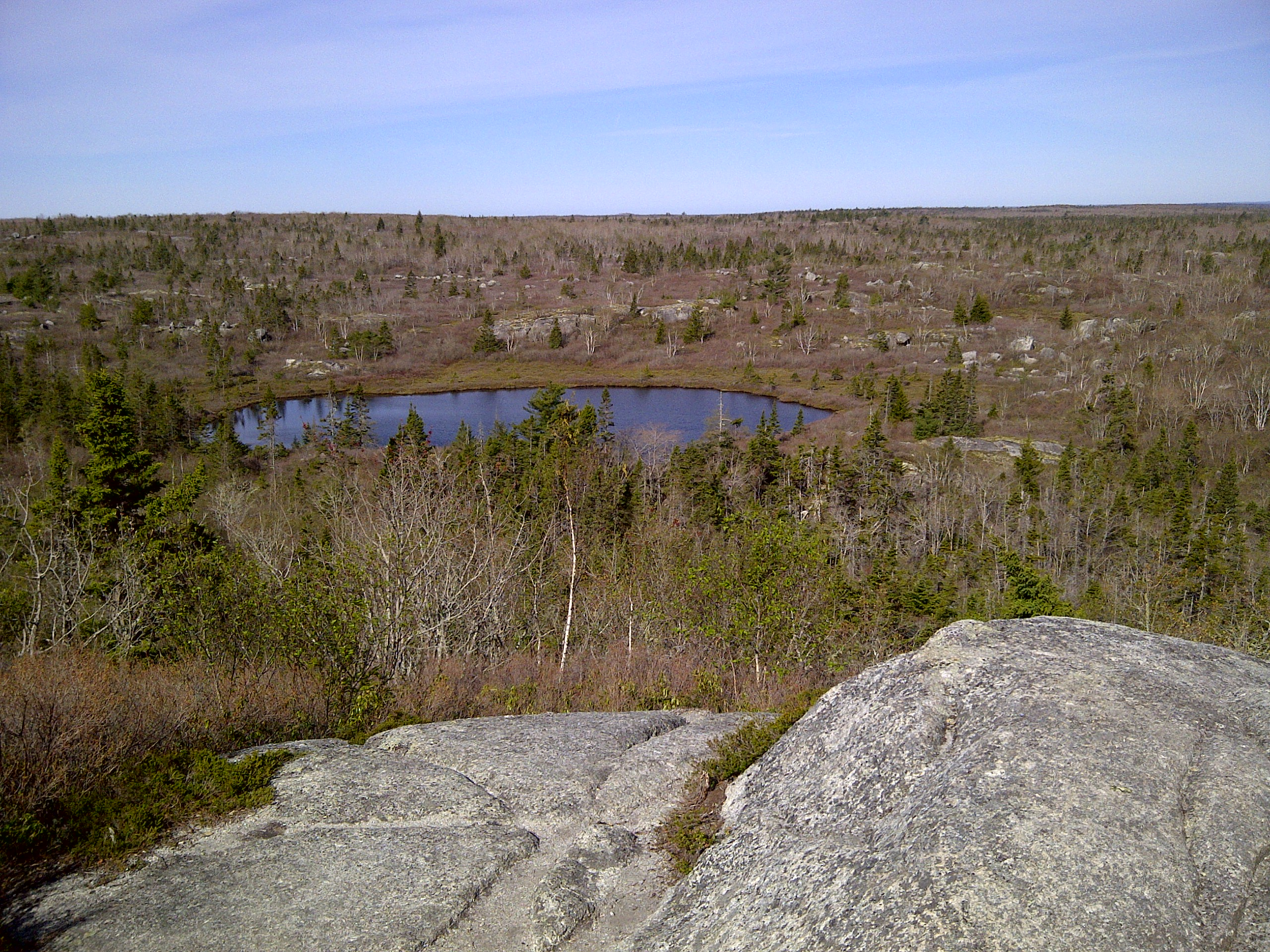

Highest point
- Elevation: 279.8 m (918 ft)
- Coordinates: 44°50′N 64°35′W

Geography
- Location: Annapolis Valley, Nova Scotia
- Parent range: Appalachian Mountains
- Topo map: NTS 21A15 Gaspereau Lake

Climbing
- Easiest route: drive/hike

South Mountain (French: Montagne du Sud; Gaelic: Beinn a Deas) is a Canadian range on the mainland portion of Nova Scotia. A granitic ridge stretching from the Annapolis Basin to Mount Uniacke, it forms the southern edge of the Annapolis Valley and shelters the valley from the climate effects of the pelagic coast along the Atlantic Ocean. Together with North Mountain, the two ranges form the Annapolis Highlands region.

In contrast to its northern counterpart, North Mountain, South Mountain rises gradually over dozens of kilometres from the Atlantic coast and descends sharply at its northern edge where it meets the Meguma strata to form the south wall of the valley. The South Mountain range is also known as the South Mountain Batholith, the largest body of granitoid rocks in the entire Appalachians and comprises both granite barrens and granite uplands. It is estimated to have developed during the late Devonian Age.

The highest point on the ridge is at an unnamed point in Kings County, 26 kilometres southeast of Berwick near Lake George.

== See also ==
- Uranium mining in Nova Scotia
- List of highest points of Canadian provinces and territories
