= Derrick Kimball =

Canadian lawyer and politician (born 1954)

Derrick J. Kimball

MLA for Kings South
- In office 1988–1993
- Preceded by: Bob Levy
- Succeeded by: Robbie Harrison

Personal details
- Born: November 20, 1954 (age 70); Halifax, Nova Scotia, Canada
- Political party: Progressive Conservative (1988–1993); Independent (1993)
- Occupation: Lawyer

Derrick John Kimball (born November 20, 1954) is a Canadian lawyer and politician. He represented Kings South in the Nova Scotia House of Assembly from 1988 to 1993 as a Progressive Conservative member.

== Early life and education ==
Born in Halifax, the son of Robert Guy Edgar Kimball and Marjorie Coady, he was educated at St. Francis Xavier University and Dalhousie Law School.

== Legal career ==
Kimball served as solicitor for the town of Wolfville from 1978 to 1990.

== Political career ==
He entered provincial politics in the 1988 election, defeating NDP candidate Steve Mattson by 452 votes in the Kings South riding. In late 1992, Kimball lost the Progressive Conservative nomination in Kings South to former MLA and cabinet minister Harry How. Kimball quit the Progressive Conservative caucus in January 1993, and ran as an independent candidate in the 1993 election. He finished third in the election, which saw Liberal Robbie Harrison defeat How by 128 votes.

In December 2020, Kimball was nominated as the Progressive Conservative candidate in Kings South for the 2021 election, but was defeated by Liberal Keith Irving.
