= Scott Brison =

Canadian politician

The Honourable Scott Brison PC
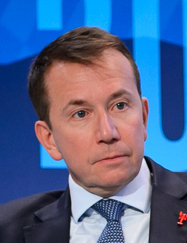
- Brison in 2017

President of the Treasury Board
- In office November 4, 2015 – January 14, 2019
- Prime Minister: Justin Trudeau
- Preceded by: Tony Clement
- Succeeded by: Jane Philpott

Minister of Public Works and Government Services
- In office July 20, 2004 – February 6, 2006
- Prime Minister: Paul Martin
- Preceded by: Stephen Owen
- Succeeded by: Michael Fortier

Member of Parliament for Kings—Hants
- In office November 27, 2000 – February 10, 2019
- Preceded by: Joe Clark
- Succeeded by: Kody Blois
- In office June 2, 1997 – July 24, 2000
- Preceded by: John Murphy
- Succeeded by: Joe Clark

Personal details
- Born: May 10, 1967 (age 59) Windsor, Nova Scotia, Canada
- Party: Liberal (2003–present)
- Other political affiliations: Progressive Conservative (1997–2003)
- Spouse: Maxime Saint-Pierre (m. 2007)
- Education: Dalhousie University

Scott A. Brison PC (born May 10, 1967) is a Canadian politician from Nova Scotia. Brison served as the Member of Parliament (MP) for the riding of Kings—Hants from June 1997 to July 2000, and from November 2000 to February 2019. He was the first openly gay MP to sit as a member of the Progressive Conservative Party. In 2003, just days after the Progressive Conservatives and the Canadian Alliance voted to merge into the Conservative Party of Canada, Brison crossed the floor to join the Liberal Party.

Born in Windsor, Nova Scotia, Brison graduated from Dalhousie University. After entering Parliament in 2000, he served as the Minister of Public Works and Government Services from 2004 until 2006 in the Paul Martin government. In 2005, he was named by the World Economic Forum as one of its "Young Global Leaders". In Opposition from 2006 to 2013, Brison has served as the Liberal Party's Finance Critic. He was President of the Treasury Board of Canada in Justin Trudeau's ministry until January 2019.

Brison announced on January 10, 2019, that he would not be standing in the 2019 federal election and stepped down from cabinet. On February 6, 2019, he announced he was resigning his seat in the House of Commons of Canada effective February 10, 2019. After leaving politics, Brison became Bank of Montreal's vice-chair of investment and corporate banking and is a member of the Canadian American Business Council's advisory board.

== Early life and education ==
Brison was born in Windsor, Nova Scotia, the son of Verna Patricia (née Salter) and Clifford Brison, who ran a grocery store. He graduated from Hants West Rural High School, subsequently earning a Bachelor of Commerce from Dalhousie University in Halifax. While in Halifax, he operated a business renting small fridges – he has jokingly referred to himself as a "fridge magnate". Brison then worked in corporate sales for ten years.

== Political career ==
Brison entered politics as a Progressive Conservative candidate in the Nova Scotia riding of Kings—Hants in the 1997 election. He defeated incumbent John Murphy with 36.3% of the vote.

In July 2000, Brison resigned his seat so that PC leader Joe Clark could enter the House of Commons. In the interim, Brison was appointed co-chair of the Progressive Conservative Party's Election Policy Platform Committee, and worked in investment banking at Yorkton Securities in Halifax.

When the 2000 election was called in October, Clark stood for election in a Calgary, Alberta riding. Brison returned as the PC candidate in Kings—Hants, and was returned to Parliament. In 2001, he served as the party's Finance and Industry critic, and was vice-chairman of the House of Commons Finance committee. Brison came out as gay in 2002, and has said that he is "not a gay politician, but a politician who happens to be gay."

=== Progressive Conservative leadership bid ===
In 2003, following Clark's retirement, Brison ran for the leadership of the Progressive Conservatives on a platform of "new ideas", that consisted of Employment Insurance reform, more private involvement in health care, integrated defence strategy with the US, and socially liberal policies. At the leadership convention, his campaign was dealt a crucial blow by John Herron who defected to the MacKay camp. Despite gaining votes on the second ballot, Brison was eliminated by three votes and threw his support to Jim Prentice. Prentice lost on the final ballot to Peter MacKay (who won with the support of David Orchard). During this time he fought publicly with other members of his party, particularly Elsie Wayne, over their opposition to same-sex marriage. Brison was highly critical of Larry Spencer's suggestion in an interview with The Vancouver Sun that gay sex should be criminalized, saying "statements like this have the potential to stigmatize the new party, so it's important that we denounce those statements strongly."

=== Crossing the floor ===
On December 10, 2003, four days after Brison voted in favour of the PCs merging with the Canadian Alliance to form the new Conservative Party of Canada, Brison announced that he would cross the floor and sit as a Liberal MP. Brison was critical of the Conservative Party, stating "I want to work with a party that I can support without reservation, a party fuelled by bold ideas, not rigid ideologies". Brison spoke highly of Paul Martin, standing in contrast to his comments a year prior where he criticized Martin in a published essay. Fellow Nova Scotia MP Peter MacKay criticized Brison for crossing the floor, characterizing him as a hypocrite and stating that he "[couldn't] find any principle whatsoever in what's happened." MacKay claimed Brison was likely offered a reward by Martin for switching parties, and predicted that Brison would "fade into the background" of the Liberal Party. New Brunswick MP Greg Thompson accused Brison of being a "political opportunist". Brison claimed his enthusiasm for the merger had become discernibly lukewarm in the final weeks before the vote. He indicated that he would honour his prior commitment to support the proposal, but said that he would reconsider his allegiance once the results were announced.

=== Liberal leadership bid ===
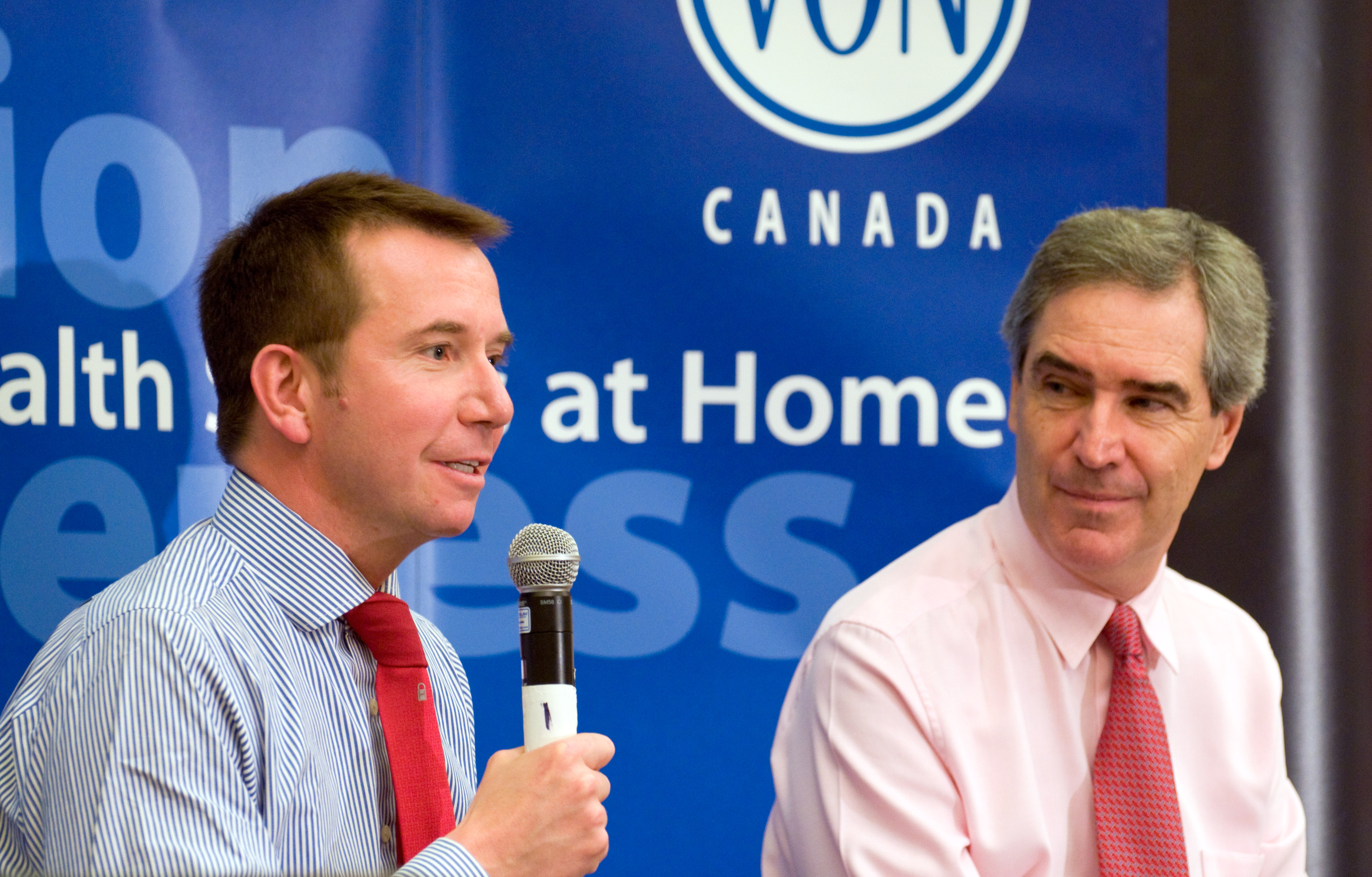
Brison and Michael Ignatieff in Ottawa in 2010

On April 22, 2006, Brison entered the race for the leadership of the Liberal Party of Canada. His Liberal leadership platform emphasised both environmentalism and economic reform calling for a "green" platform that called for personal and corporate tax cuts to prompt business growth and curb pollution. Brison won 4.0% of the vote on the first ballot with 192 delegates, leaving him in 6th place out of eight candidates. He dropped out and threw his support behind Bob Rae. When Bob Rae dropped out on the third ballot and released his delegates, Scott Brison opted to support the politically similar Michael Ignatieff. The final winner of the leadership convention was Stéphane Dion.

=== Martin and Trudeau governments ===
On December 13, 2003, he was appointed as a parliamentary secretary to the Prime Minister with special emphasis on Canada-U.S. Relations and sworn into the Queen's Privy Council for Canada. In the 2004 election, Brison was re-elected, his first victory as a Liberal. On July 20, 2004, Brison was named to cabinet as Minister of Public Works in Martin's post-election shuffle. In doing so, he became Canada's first openly gay cabinet minister.

As the youngest member of cabinet, Brison also served on three cabinet committees – Treasury Board, Domestic Affairs, and Expenditure Review. Previously, he had served as vice-chairman of the Standing Committee on Finance, been a member of the Standing Committee on Industry, the Standing Committee on Foreign Affairs and International Trade, and the Standing Committee on Government Operations and Estimates.

He was also a member of the Canada-U.S. Inter-Parliamentary Group and has served as the vice-president of the Canadian group of the Inter-Parliamentary Union where he took part in conferences in Moscow and New York. He was also part of the Canadian delegation sent to two annual meetings of the European Bank for Reconstruction and Development in London.

In 2012, while Brison served as Liberal finance critic, Bank of Canada governor Mark Carney stayed at his summer cottage in Nova Scotia to encourage Carney to run in the party's leadership election. The trip was cleared from conflict of interest allegations.

On November 4, 2015, he was appointed the Treasury Board President in Justin Trudeau's cabinet, a position he held until the end of 2018. Brison initially committed to running in the 2019 federal election, however in December 2018 he decided to retire. The timing of his retirement was called into question, coming as he was currently involved in the controversy from the prosecution of Admiral Mark Norman. Norman's lawyers alleged that Brison attempted to cancel a $668 million government leasing contract with Davie Shipbuilding on behalf of Irving Shipbuilding, a company from his home province of Nova Scotia which Norman's lawyers alleged Brison had close ties with. Brison repeatedly denied that the timing of his resignation was related to the case. Announcing his decision to leave politics, Brison said at the time that it "feels very right" to him.

== Post-political career ==
After leaving politics, Brison became Bank of Montreal's vice-chair of investment and corporate banking and is a member of the Canadian American Business Council's advisory board. From 2020 to 2023, he was chancellor of Dalhousie University.

== Personal life ==
It was announced in October 2005 that he and his partner Maxime Saint-Pierre intended to marry. They were married on August 18, 2007 in Chéverie. Their daughters, Claire Brison-St. Pierre and Rose Brison-St. Pierre, were born via a surrogate mother on February 21, 2014.

== Electoral record ==
2015 Canadian federal election: Kings—Hants
Party	Candidate	Votes	%	±%	Expenditures
Liberal	Scott Brison	33,026	70.74	+31.19	$88,355.31
Conservative	David Morse	8,677	18.59	–18.05	$80,877.49
New Democratic	Hugh Curry	2,998	6.42	–13.60	$15,831.09
Green	Will Cooper	1,569	3.36	–0.42	$1,277.65
Rhinoceros	Megan Brown-Hodges	184	0.39	–	$730.27
Independent	Edd Twohig	132	0.28	–	$1,070.96
Independent	Cliff James Williams	100	0.21	–	–
Total valid votes/Expense limit		46,686	100.00		$200,775.69
Total rejected ballots		202	0.43		
Turnout		46,888	70.56		
Eligible voters		66,454			
Liberal hold		Swing		+24.62	
Source: Elections Canada

2011 Canadian federal election: Kings—Hants
Party	Candidate	Votes	%	±%
Liberal	Scott Brison	15,887	39.56	-4.62
Conservative	David Morse	14,714	36.63	+10.49
New Democratic	Mark Rogers	8,043	20.03	-1.98
Green	Sheila Richardson	1,520	3.78	-2.46
Total valid votes/Expense limit		40,164	100.0	
Total rejected, unmarked and declined ballots		200	0.50	+0.01
Turnout		40,364	61.76	+3.17
Eligible voters		65,355		
Liberal hold		Swing		-7.56

2008 Canadian federal election: Kings—Hants
Party	Candidate	Votes	%	±%
Liberal	Scott Brison	16,641	44.18	-1.38
Conservative	Rosemary Segado	9,846	26.14	-6.05
New Democratic	Carol Harris	8,291	22.01	+2.99
Green	Brendan MacNeill	2,353	6.24	+4.04
Christian Heritage	Jim Hnatiuk	528	1.40	–
Total valid votes/Expense limit		37,659	100.0	
Total rejected, unmarked and declined ballots		187	0.49	+0.08
Turnout		37,846	58.59	-6.60
Eligible voters		64,593		
Liberal hold		Swing		+2.34

2006 Canadian federal election: Kings—Hants
Party	Candidate	Votes	%	±%
Liberal	Scott Brison	19,491	45.56	-1.05
Conservative	Bob Mullan	13,772	32.19	+2.07
New Democratic	Mary Dewolfe	8,138	19.02	+1.33
Green	Sheila Richardson	947	2.21	-1.41
Marijuana	Chummy Anthony	436	1.02	–
Total valid votes/Expense limit		42,784	100.0	
Total rejected, unmarked and declined ballots		177	0.41	-0.35
Turnout		42,961	65.19	+2.77
Eligible voters		65,898		
Liberal hold		Swing		-1.56

2004 Canadian federal election: Kings—Hants
Party	Candidate	Votes	%	±%
Liberal	Scott Brison	17,555	46.61	+16.11
Conservative	Bob Mullan	11,344	30.12	-19.42
New Democratic	Skip Hambling	6,663	17.69	+0.08
Green	Kevin Stacey	1,364	3.62	–
Christian Heritage	Jim Hnatiuk	493	1.31	–
Independent	Richard Hennigar	242	0.64	+0.34
Total valid votes/Expense limit		37,661	100.0	
Total rejected, unmarked and declined ballots		289	0.76	
Turnout		37,950	62.42	
Eligible voters		60,801		
Liberal gain from Progressive Conservative		Swing		+18.56

2000 Canadian federal election: Kings—Hants
Party	Candidate	Votes	%	±%
Progressive Conservative	Scott Brison	17,612	40.29	-13.16
Liberal	Claude O'Hara	13,213	30.23	-0.03
New Democratic	Kaye Johnson	7,244	16.57	-10.57
Alliance	Gerry Fulton	4,618	10.56	-5.58
Marijuana	Jim King	669	1.53	
Independent	Kenneth MacEachern	140	0.32	
Natural Law	Richard Hennigar	133	0.30	-0.28
Communist	Graham Jake MacDonald	85	0.19	-0.33
Total valid votes		43,714	100.00	

1997 Canadian federal election: Kings—Hants
Party	Candidate	Votes	%	±%
Progressive Conservative	Scott Brison	17,401	36.27	+16.04
Liberal	John Murphy	14,515	30.26	-9.23
New Democratic	Philip A. Brown	9,101	18.97	+13.97
Reform	Lloyd Schmidt	6,424	13.39	+0.57
Natural Law	James McLelland	278	0.58	-0.47
Independent	Graham Jake MacDonald	251	0.52	
Total valid votes		47,970	100.00	

29th Canadian Ministry (2015–2025) – Cabinet of Justin Trudeau
Cabinet posts (2)
Predecessor	Office	Successor
Position Created	Minister of Digital Government; July 18, 2018 – January 14, 2019	Jane Philpott
Tony Clement	President of the Treasury Board; November 4, 2015 – January 14, 2019	Jane Philpott
27th Canadian Ministry (2003–2006) – Cabinet of Paul Martin
Cabinet post (1)
Predecessor	Office	Successor
Stephen Owen	Minister of Public Works and Government Services; 2004–2006	Michael Fortier
