= John Murphy (Nova Scotia politician) =

Canadian politician (1937–2024)

Member of Parliament for Annapolis Valley—Hants
- In office October 25, 1993 – June 2, 1997
- Preceded by: Pat Nowlan
- Succeeded by: Scott Brison

Personal details
- Born: 26 August 1937 (age 88) Halifax, Nova Scotia
- Died: June 12, 2024 (aged 86)
- Party: Liberal
- Profession: Social Worker, Administrator

John Murphy (August 26, 1937 – June 12, 2024) was a member of the House of Commons of Canada from 1993 to 1997.

Born in Halifax, Nova Scotia, Murphy became a Liberal party candidate for the Annapolis Valley—Hants electoral district in the 1988 federal election. He lost to Progressive Conservative candidate Pat Nowlan.

His second attempt for the riding succeeded in 1993 as he defeated incumbent Nowlan (now an independent) and new Progressive Conservative candidate Jim White. In the 1997 federal election, Murphy would campaign in the riding now restructured as Kings—Hants, only to be defeated by Progressive Conservative candidate Scott Brison. Murphy has not attempted to return to Parliament since his term in the 35th Canadian Parliament.
