= Keith Irving =

Canadian politician

The Honourable Keith Irving ECNS
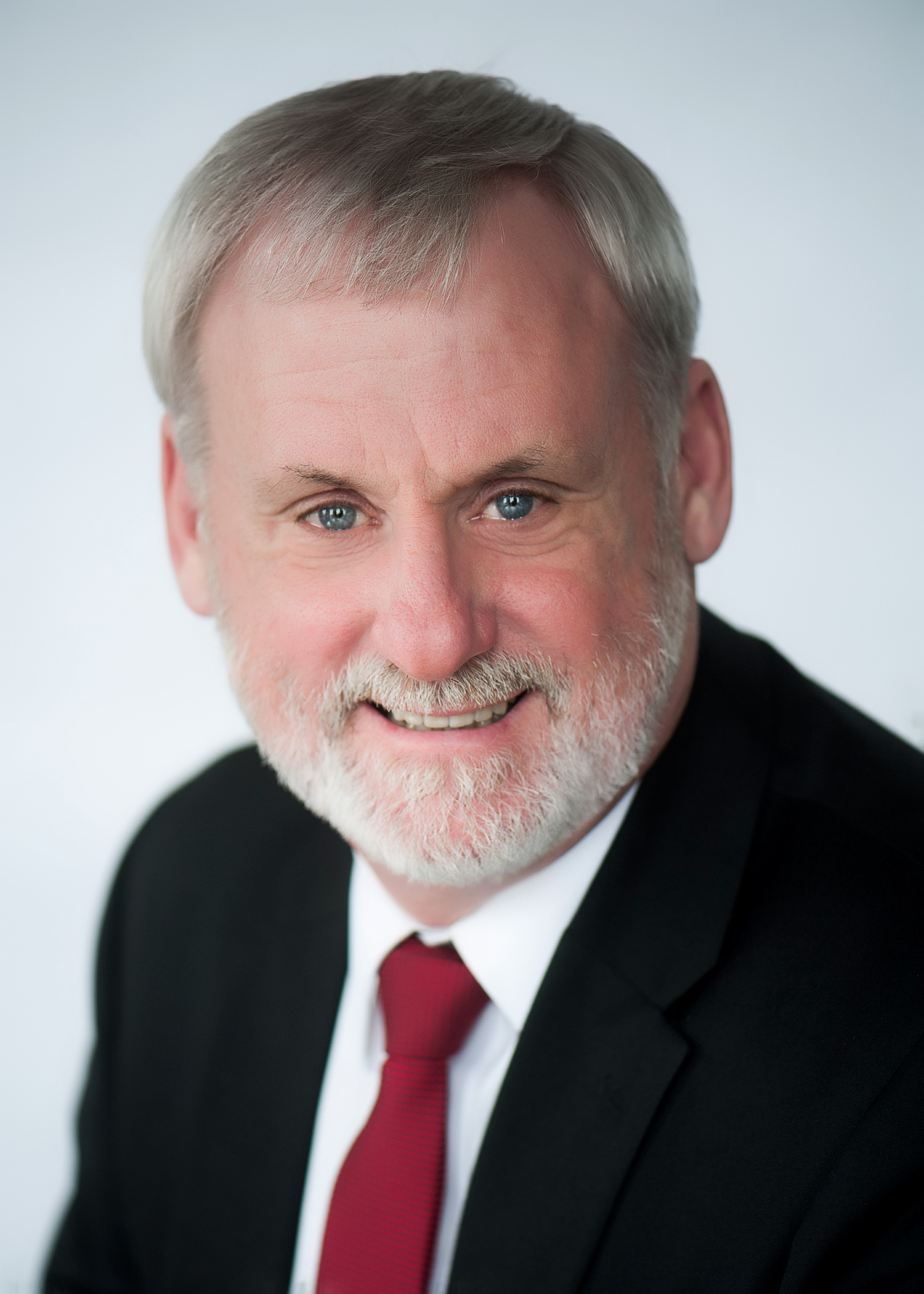

Member of the Nova Scotia House of Assembly for Kings South
- In office October 8, 2013 – October 27, 2024
- Preceded by: Ramona Jennex
- Succeeded by: Julie Vanexan

Personal details
- Born: Richard Keith Irving; 1958 (age 67–68) Moncton, New Brunswick
- Party: Liberal

Keith Irving (born 1958) is a Canadian politician, who was elected to the Nova Scotia House of Assembly in the 2013 provincial election. A member of the Nova Scotia Liberal Party, he represents the electoral district of Kings South. Irving has previously served on Wolfville Town Council and Iqaluit Town Council. Irving is a former architect by trade.

In 2017, Irving was re-elected in Kings South.

On February 23, 2021, Irving was appointed to the Executive Council of Nova Scotia as Minister of Environment and Climate Change, and Chair of Treasury and Policy Board. Irving was re-elected in the 2021 election, however the Rankin Liberals lost government becoming the Official Opposition.

On July 19, 2024, Irving announced he would not run in the 2024 Nova Scotia general election.

== Electoral record ==
2021 Nova Scotia general election
Party	Candidate	Votes	%	±%
Liberal	Keith Irving	4,049	44.11	-2.60
Progressive Conservative	Derrick Kimball	3,046	33.18	+5.87
New Democratic	Mercedes Brian	1,808	19.70	-1.32
Green	Barry Leslie	276	3.01	-0.68
Total valid votes		9,179	99.70	
Total rejected ballots		28	0.30	
Turnout		9,207	55.70	
Eligible voters		16,531		
Liberal hold		Swing		-4.24

2017 Nova Scotia general election
Party	Candidate	Votes	%	±%
Liberal	Keith Irving	4,269	46.71	+ 7.46
Progressive Conservative	Peter Harrison	2,496	27.31	+ 4.61
New Democratic Party	Stephen Schneider	1,921	21.02	14.53
Green	Shelia G. Richardson	337	3.69	+ 1.19
Atlantica	Joel Hirtle	116	1.27	–

2013 Nova Scotia general election
Party	Candidate	Votes	%	±%
Liberal	Keith Irving	3,939	39.25	
New Democratic Party	Ramona Jennex	3,568	35.55	
Progressive Conservative	Shane MacKenzie Buchan	2,278	22.70	
Green	Shelia G. Richardson	251	2.50	–
