= Jim Morton (politician) =

Canadian politician

MLA for Kings North
- In office June 9, 2009 – October 8, 2013
- Preceded by: Mark Parent
- Succeeded by: John Lohr

Personal details
- Born: August 31, 1951 (age 74) Kentville, Nova Scotia
- Party: New Democrat
- Occupation: social worker

James Ernest Morton is a Canadian politician, who was elected to the Nova Scotia House of Assembly in the 2009 provincial election. He represented the electoral district of Kings North, as a member of the New Democratic Party, until his defeat in the 2013 election. During his term he served as an NDP backbencher, never being appointed to the cabinet led by Premier Darrell Dexter.

Born in Kentville, Nova Scotia in 1951, Morton grew up on a family farm in Somerset. He was educated at Acadia University and Dalhousie University, becoming a social worker. At the time of his election to the legislature, he was the manager of the addiction services program at Annapolis Valley Health in Kentville. In March 2016, Morton was named chief of staff for NDP leader Gary Burrill.

In 2026, Morton endorsed Avi Lewis in that year's federal NDP leadership race.
