= Glenn Ells =

Canadian politician

MLA for Kings North
- In office 1974–1978
- Preceded by: Victor Thorpe
- Succeeded by: Edward Twohig

Personal details
- Born: May 23, 1934 (age 91) Canning, Nova Scotia, Canada
- Party: Liberal
- Spouse: Leta Ells
- Occupation: Farmer, Politician, Author

Glenn Ells is a former Member of the Legislative Assembly of Nova Scotia, Canada for the constituency of Kings North. He sat as a member of the Nova Scotia Liberal Party from 1974 to 1978.

A graduate of the Nova Scotia Agricultural College and McGill University, Ells was elected in the 1974 election. In April 1978, he was appointed to the Executive Council of Nova Scotia as Minister of the Environment. He re-offered in the 1978 general election, but was defeated.
