= Robbie Harrison =

Canadian politician & educator (born 1948)

The Honourable Robbie Harrison ECNS

MLA for Kings South
- In office 1993–1999
- Preceded by: Derrick Kimball
- Succeeded by: David Morse

Minister of Justice and Attorney General of Nova Scotia and Provincial Secretary of Nova Scotia
- In office December 16, 1998 – August 16, 1999
- Preceded by: Jim Smith
- Succeeded by: Michael Baker

Personal details
- Born: 1948 (age 77–78)
- Party: Liberal
- Occupation: Teacher

Robert "Robbie" S. Harrison (born 1948) is a Canadian politician and educator. He represented Kings South in the Nova Scotia House of Assembly from 1993 to 1999 as a Liberal member.

Harrison was educated at Acadia University. He was a school teacher and principal of the Coldbrook School. He was a member of the board of governors for Acadia University and the board of trustees for Eastern Kings Memorial Hospital.

Harrison entered provincial politics in the 1993 election, defeating former Progressive Conservative cabinet minister Harry How by 128 votes in the Kings South riding. On June 11, 1993, Harrison was appointed to the Executive Council of Nova Scotia as Minister of Environment. In March 1995, he was moved to Minister of the Economic Renewal Agency. On June 27, 1996, Harrison became Minister of Education and Culture, a job he kept when Russell MacLellan took over as premier in July 1997.

Harrison was re-elected in the 1998 election. On April 8, 1998, he was retained as Minister of Education and Culture, but was also given the additional responsibility for sport and recreation, and science and technology. In December 1998, MacLellan shuffled his cabinet, moving Harrison from Education to Attorney General and Minister of Justice, and also naming him Minister of Business and Consumer Services, while retaining the minor roles he had been given following the election. In the 1999 election, Harrison was defeated by Progressive Conservative David Morse. Following his defeat, Harrison returned the field of education.

Following Stephen McNeil's election as premier in the 2013 election, Harrison served as a member of his transition team.
