= Paul Kinsman =

Canadian politician

MLA for Kings West
- In office 1963–1967
- Preceded by: Edward D. MacArthur
- Succeeded by: Gordon Tidman

MLA for Kings South
- In office February 21, 1984 – November 6, 1984
- Preceded by: Harry How
- Succeeded by: Bob Levy

Personal details
- Born: March 5, 1931 Berwick, Nova Scotia
- Died: May 11, 2014 (aged 83) Kentville, Nova Scotia
- Party: Progressive Conservative
- Occupation: family physician

Paul Eric Kinsman (March 5, 1931 – May 11, 2014), was a Canadian physician and politician in the province of Nova Scotia. He served in the Nova Scotia House of Assembly as a MLA for the constituencies of West Kings (1963–1967) and Kings South (1984). He was also Mayor of Wolfville, Nova Scotia from 1974 to 1976.

Kinsman was born in Berwick, Nova Scotia. He attended Acadia University (Horton Academy), Nova Scotia Normal College and Dalhousie University and held Doctor of Medicine and Master of Surgery degrees from the latter. He also later obtained a Bachelor of Arts in political science from Acadia University in 1972. After a brief teaching career, he practiced as a family physician first in Aylesford, Nova Scotia, and later in Wolfville until his retirement in 2006. In 2001, he was awarded with an Honorary Life Membership in the College of Family Medicine. He died at the Valley Regional Hospital in Kentville, Nova Scotia on May 11, 2014, at the age of 83.
