= Gladys Porter =

Canadian politician

Gladys Muriel Porter MLA M.B.E. D.C.L.

MLA for Kings North
- In office June 7, 1960 – April 20, 1967
- Preceded by: Eric Balcom
- Succeeded by: Victor Thorpe

Personal details
- Born: August 4, 1893 Sydney, Nova Scotia
- Died: April 30, 1967 (aged 73) Kentville, Nova Scotia
- Party: Progressive Conservative

"It is satisfying to know that women join in this partnership, working together 'to hold fast to basic principles and values and to exert influence to preserve a democratic way of life.'"

— Gladys Porter
Nova Scotia House of Assembly
February 8, 1961

Gladys Muriel Porter, MBE, (née Richardson; August 4, 1893 – April 30, 1967) was the first woman in the Maritimes to be elected as Mayor, and the first female Member of the Nova Scotia House of Assembly. She was born in Sydney, Nova Scotia, the daughter of Walter Richardson and Christina Macpherson.

Porter was elected to Kentville town council in 1943. She was then elected Mayor of Kentville in 1946 and served until 1960, when she ran successfully as a Progressive Conservative to represent the provincial electoral district of Kings North.

Porter was re-elected to the Legislature in 1963 and served until her death on April 30, 1967, in Kentville, Nova Scotia.
