= Harry How =

Canadian politician

Harry W. How
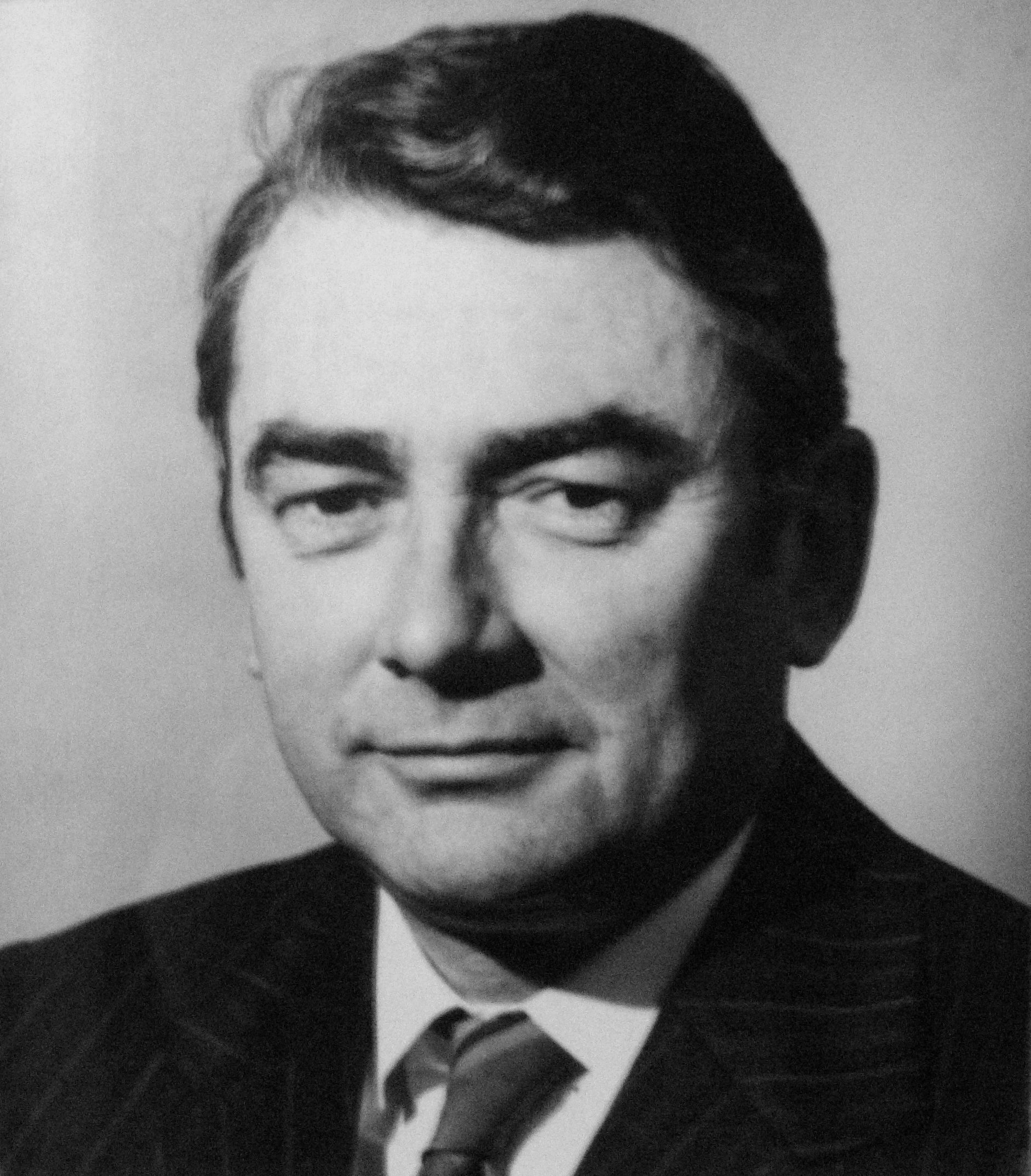
- How, c. 1973

MLA for Kings South
- In office 1970–1983
- Preceded by: Edward Haliburton
- Succeeded by: Paul Kinsman

Personal details
- Born: September 29, 1919 Granville Ferry, Nova Scotia
- Died: February 1, 2001 (aged 81) Kentville, Nova Scotia
- Party: Progressive Conservative
- Occupation: Lawyer

Henry W. How (September 29, 1919 – February 1, 2001) was a Canadian politician. He represented the electoral district of Kings South in the Nova Scotia House of Assembly from 1970 to 1983. He was a member of the Progressive Conservative Party of Nova Scotia.

Born in 1919 in Granville Ferry, Annapolis County, Nova Scotia, How was a graduate of the University of New Brunswick. How was a resident of Wolfville when he entered provincial politics in the 1970 election, being elected MLA for Kings South. He was re-elected in the 1974, 1978, and 1981 elections.

On October 5, 1978, How was appointed to the Executive Council of Nova Scotia as Attorney General and Provincial Secretary. He held the positions until November 1983, when he retired from politics and was appointed Chief Judge of the Provincial Court of Nova Scotia. Prior to the 1993 election, How returned to provincial politics and defeated incumbent MLA Derrick Kimball for the Progressive Conservative nomination in his old riding of Kings South. In the general election, Liberal Robbie Harrison defeated How by 128 votes, while Kimball who ran as an independent finished third. How briefly returned to political life in 2000 when he joined the Canadian Alliance, and campaigned against federal Progressive Conservative leader Joe Clark in the September 2000 Kings—Hants byelection.

How died in Kentville on February 1, 2001.
