= Eric Balcom =

Canadian politician

Eric Wilfred Balcom MLA CM

MLA for Kings North
- In office 1956–1960
- Preceded by: new district
- Succeeded by: Gladys Porter

Personal details
- Born: May 13, 1909 Port Dufferin, Nova Scotia
- Died: May 31, 1989 (aged 80)
- Party: Liberal

Eric Wilfred Balcom (March 13, 1909 – May 31, 1989) was a businessman, political figure, and Companion of the Order of Canada.

Born in Port Dufferin, Halifax County, Nova Scotia, Balcom moved to Wolfville in 1938. He established two nursing homes there. Balcom then operated the Paramount Hotel and Cottages from 1942 to 1970. He was Mayor of Wolfville from 1950 to 1955 and ran unsuccessfully for a seat in the Parliament in 1953.

Balcom was elected to the Nova Scotia House of Assembly in 1956, representing Kings North as a Liberal. He re-offered in the 1960 general election, but was defeated.

Balcom was president of the Atlantic School of Theology, the Nova Scotia Kidney Association, the Canadian Mental Health Association, and the Wolfville Board of Trade.

Balcom returned to Port Dufferin in 1970. He was appointed to the Order of Canada on June 20, 1983.

In 1989, Balcom died as a result of a car accident.
