= Nova Scotia peninsula =

Peninsula in Nova Scotia

Coordinates: 45°00′N 63°45′W

Nova Scotia Peninsula
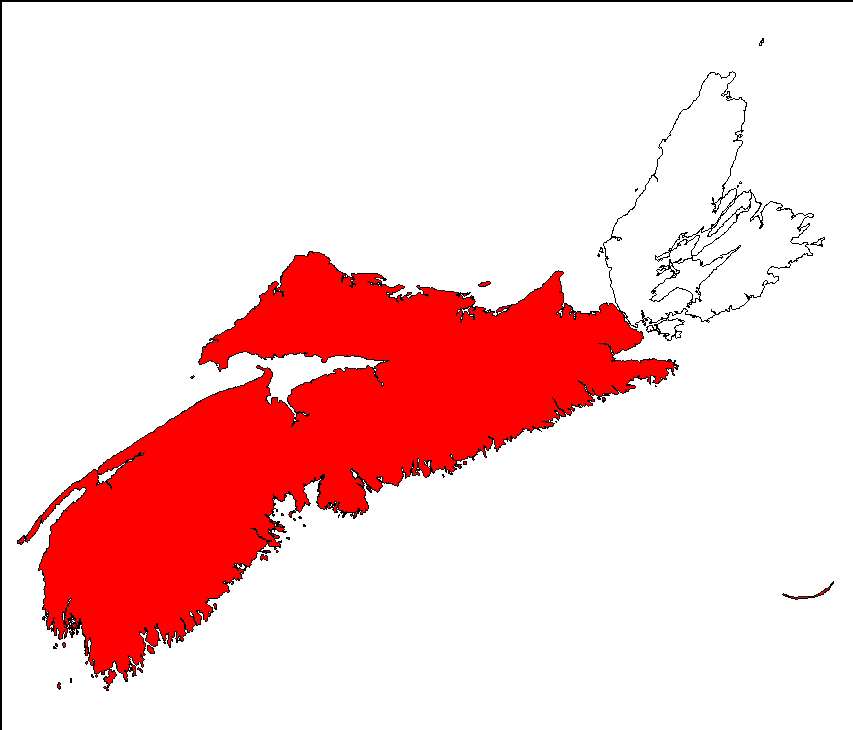
- Map of Nova Scotia highlighting the Nova Scotia peninsula

- Location within Nova Scotia

Geography
- Location: Nova Scotia, Canada
- Area: 44,973 km^{2} (17,364 sq mi)
- Highest elevation: 360 m (1180 ft)
- Highest point: Nuttby Mountain

Administration
- Canada
- Province: Nova Scotia
- Largest settlement: Halifax (pop. 316,701)

Demographics
- Population: 837,364 (2021)
- Pop. density: 18.6/km^{2} (48.2/sq mi)

Additional information
- Time zone: AST (UTC-4)
  - Summer (DST): ADT (UTC-3)
- Area code: 902, 782

The Nova Scotia peninsula is a peninsula on the Atlantic coast of North America.

== Location ==
The Nova Scotia peninsula is part of the province of Nova Scotia, Canada and is connected to the neighbouring province of New Brunswick through the Isthmus of Chignecto. It fronts the open Atlantic Ocean on the south and southeast, the Gulf of Maine to the west, the Bay of Fundy and its sub-basins to the northwest, the Northumberland Strait to the north, and the Strait of Canso to the east.

The narrow and deep waters of the Strait of Canso separate the peninsula from Cape Breton Island, the second largest land mass constituting the province of Nova Scotia and the white island on the map attached .

In addition to Cape Breton Island, other much smaller islands are geologically associated with the Nova Scotia peninsula, including Boularderie Island, Brier Island, Long Island, Pictou Island, Tancook Island and various smaller islands along the Atlantic coast.

== Geology ==
The peninsula can be divided into two distinct geological regions north and south of a fault line (the Cobequid and Chedabucto faults) extending between the Bay of Fundy sub-basins of the Minas Basin and Cobequid Bay in the west, through to Chedabucto Bay in the east.

=== North ===
The northern portion of the peninsula is dominated by the Avalon Uplands (the Cobequid Hills and Pictou-Antigonish Highlands) and the Carboniferous Lowlands, the latter of which straddles the fault zone.

The Cobequid Mountains contain the highest elevation points on the peninsula. This low, heavily eroded part of the Appalachian Mountains, along with the Pictou-Antigonish Highlands, comprises a highland across the northern portion of the peninsula with average elevations between 250–300 metres. It was heavily covered in sediment during glaciation; consequently it hosts an abundant forest as well as agricultural activities.

The Carboniferous Lowlands includes carboniferous sedimentary rocks south of the Minas Basin and along the north shore of the peninsula immediately south of the Northumberland Strait. The area south and east of the Minas Basin is dominated by karst topography lending to numerous gypsum deposits. Coal seams are found in the western and central areas of Cumberland County in the Joggins-River Hebert basin and the Springhill basin, along with the Debert basin and the Pictou basin.

Throughout the northern portion of the peninsula, the lowland plains, rolling uplands, and coastal fringe areas support numerous settlements, many of which developed around mineral extraction, particularly coal. When included with the Sydney and Inverness coal fields on Cape Breton Island, these regions were extremely prominent in the industrial and social development of Nova Scotia.

=== South ===
In addition to sharing the Carboniferous Lowlands, the southern portion of the peninsula is dominated by the Atlantic Interior (Sissiboo Lowlands, South Mountain, various slate ridges), followed by the comparatively small Triassic Lowlands (the Annapolis Valley), and the Fundy Coast (including Economy Mountain and North Mountain) and Atlantic Coast regions.

The Atlantic Interior is dominated by a glacial landscape of exposed granitic rock, thick forest, drumlins and numerous lakes. The Sissiboo Lowlands comprise many river valleys and lowland inland areas in the southwest and central portion of the peninsula. The South Mountain is a steadily rising slope that descends sharply at the Annapolis Valley but more gradually toward the Atlantic, resulting in a plateau across much of the southwest interior of the peninsula with average elevations of 150 m and maximum elevations of 275 m. Slate ridges are prominent in the Rawdon Hills and Wittenburg Ridge areas along the boundary with the Carboniferous Lowlands.

The Fundy Coast region includes the North Mountain ridge as well as the Digby Neck and the Economy Mountain areas along the north side of the Minas Basin. The Atlantic Coast region includes the barren and wind-swept regions from Yarmouth to Canso, extending several kilometres inland.

The Triassic Lowlands is an area of soft sandstone, much of which is covered by water resulting from sea level rise. The remnant is the open ended Annapolis Valley which is sheltered by the Fundy Coast and the Atlantic Interior, providing a micro-climate unique to the Atlantic provinces and conducive to fruit and vegetable farming.

== Historic name ==
The present-day use of the term Acadian Peninsula refers to a peninsula in northeastern New Brunswick.

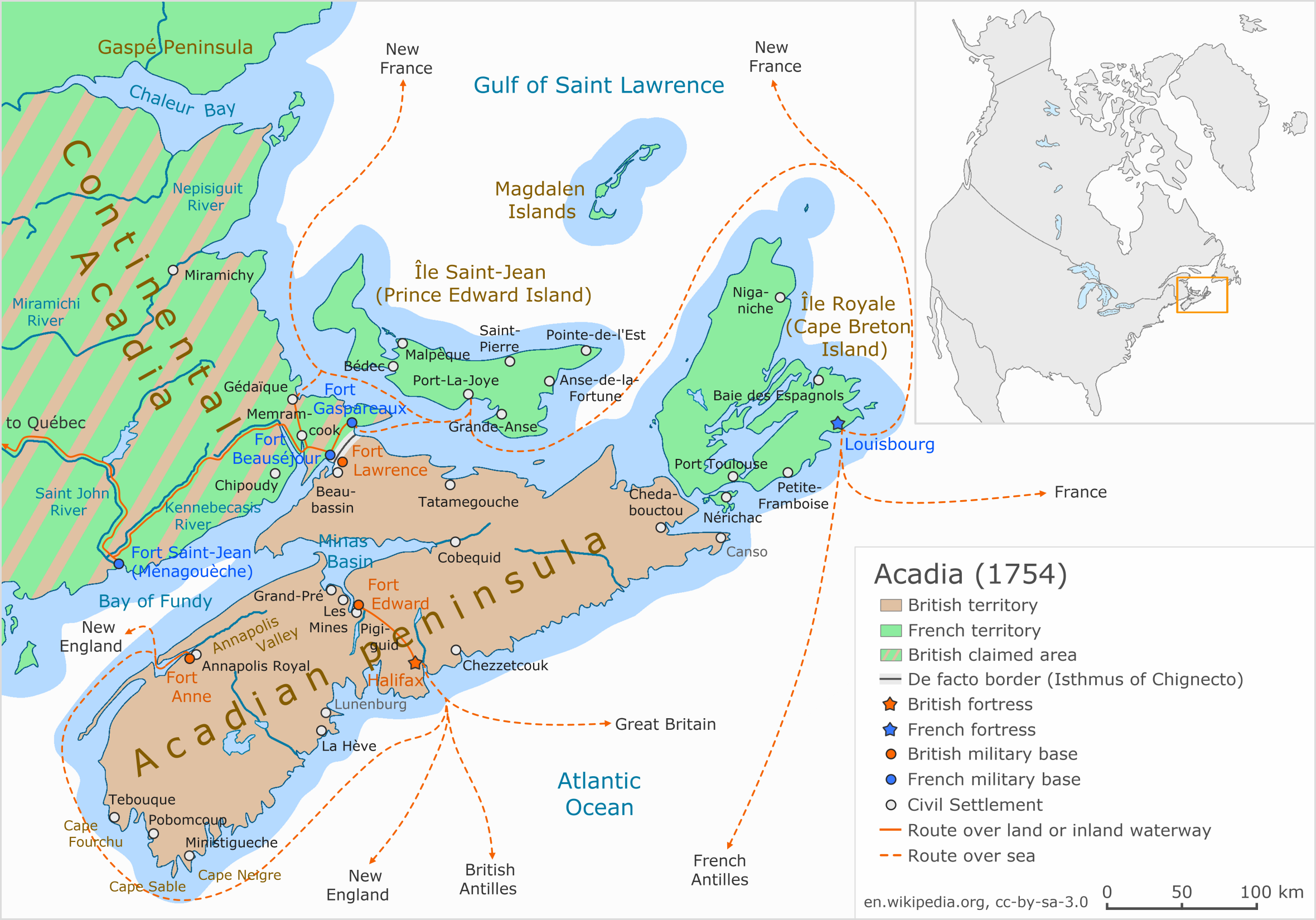
The "Acadian Peninsula" in this 1754 map of Acadia refers to the present-day Nova Scotia peninsula. This territory came under British control in 1713.

The term Acadian Peninsula has been used to describe the present-day Nova Scotia peninsula in historic documents. Prior to 1713, this territory was the heart of the French colony of Acadia, which focused its settlement efforts along the southern and northeastern shores of Baie Francois (now the Bay of Fundy).

The Treaty of Utrecht in 1713 gave Great Britain control of "Acadia"; however, the boundaries were never properly defined. Acadia is considered by many historians to have encompassed present-day New Brunswick, eastern Maine, Anticosti Island, the Gaspé Peninsula, Prince Edward Island and Cape Breton Island – all lands along the southern and western shores of the Gulf of St. Lawrence (some treaties have placed the boundary of Acadia as far south as Massachusetts).

The large peninsula that is today the mainland portion of the province of Nova Scotia was referred to as the Acadian Peninsula at the time that Britain took control, with this territory falling under the Colony of Nova Scotia.

The peninsula was known as Enmigtaqamu'g in the Mi'kmaw language.

== Note ==
- The term "peninsula" in the title of this article is not capitalized as this is not a formal geographic name authorized by the Geographic Names Board of Canada. Other informal terms used to refer to this geographic feature include Peninsular Nova Scotia and Mainland Nova Scotia.

== See also ==
- Isthmus of Chignecto
- Geography of Nova Scotia
- Maritime Peninsula
