= David Morse (politician) =

Canadian politician

The Honourable David M. Morse ECNS

Member of the Nova Scotia House of Assembly for Kings South
- In office July 27, 1999 – June 9, 2009
- Preceded by: Robbie Harrison
- Succeeded by: Ramona Jennex

Personal details
- Born: October 31, 1954 (age 71) Nova Scotia, Canada
- Party: Progressive Conservative

David M. Morse (born October 31, 1954) is a Canadian politician in Nova Scotia. He represented the electoral district of Kings South in the Nova Scotia House of Assembly from 1999 to 2009 as a member of the Progressive Conservatives.

== Early life and education ==
Morse graduated with a Bachelor of Arts from Mount Allison University, and then received a master's degree in Business Administration from McMaster University. Morse was a self-employed life and disability insurance broker before running for politics in 1999.

== Political career ==
Morse first attempted to enter provincial politics in 1998, running as the Progressive Conservative candidate in Kings South. He finished third in the 1998 election, losing to Liberal incumbent Robbie Harrison. In the 1999 election, Morse was again nominated as the Progressive Conservative candidate in the riding, this time defeating Harrison. Morse was re-elected in the 2003 and 2006 elections.

On January 18, 2001, Morse was appointed to the Executive Council of Nova Scotia as Minister of Environment and Labour. In a December 2002 cabinet shuffle, Morse was named Minister of Community Services. He retained that post following both the 2003 election, and the swearing-in of the Rodney MacDonald government in February 2006. Following the 2006 election, Morse was shuffled to Minister of Natural Resources. In January 2009, Morse was named Minister of Environment, Minister of Emergency Management, and Minister Responsible for Military Relations. In the 2009 election, Morse was defeated by NDP candidate Ramona Jennex.

On October 27, 2010, Morse announced that was he was seeking the Conservative Party of Canada nomination in the riding of Kings—Hants for the 2011 federal election. He became the candidate on January 6, 2011, winning the nomination by acclamation. On election night, Morse was defeated by Liberal incumbent Scott Brison.

Morse was nominated again as the Conservative candidate in Kings—Hants for the 2015 federal election. On October 19, 2015, Brison defeated Morse by over 24,000 votes.

=== Electoral record ===
2015 Canadian federal election: Kings—Hants
Party	Candidate	Votes	%	±%
Liberal	Scott Brison	33,026	70.74	+31.18
Conservative	David Morse	8,677	18.59	–18.04
New Democratic	Hugh Curry	2,998	6.42	–13.61
Green	Will Cooper	1,569	3.36	–0.42
Rhinoceros	Megan Brown-Hodges	184	0.39	–
Independent	Edd Twohig	132	0.28	–
Independent	Cliff James Williams	100	0.21	–
Total valid votes		46,686	100.0	
Total rejected ballots		202	0.43	–0.07
Turnout		46,888	70.56	+8.80
Eligible voters		66,454		
Liberal hold		Swing		+24.61

2011 Canadian federal election: Kings—Hants
Party	Candidate	Votes	%	±%
Liberal	Scott Brison	15,887	39.56	-4.62
Conservative	David Morse	14,714	36.63	+10.49
New Democratic	Mark Rogers	8,043	20.03	-1.98
Green	Sheila Richardson	1,520	3.78	-2.46
Total valid votes/Expense limit		40,164	100.0	
Total rejected, unmarked and declined ballots		200	0.50	+0.01
Turnout		40,364	61.76	+3.17
Eligible voters		65,355		
Liberal hold		Swing		-7.56

2009 Nova Scotia general election
Party	Candidate	Votes	%	±%
New Democratic Party	Ramona Jennex	4,038	41.18	
Progressive Conservative	David Morse	2,759	28.14	
Liberal	Paula Howatt	2,639	26.91	
Green	Brendan MacNeill	369	3.76	–

2006 Nova Scotia general election
Party	Candidate	Votes	%	±%
Progressive Conservative	David Morse	3,788	42.36	
New Democratic Party	David Mangle	3,130	35.00	
Liberal	Ray Savage	1,797	20.10	
Green	Steve McGowen	226	2.54	–

2003 Nova Scotia general election
Party	Candidate	Votes	%	±%
Progressive Conservative	David Morse	3,347	37.65	
New Democratic Party	David Mangle	2,794	31.43	
Liberal	Maura Ryan	2,682	30.17	
Nova Scotia Party	Victor Harris	67	0.75	

1999 Nova Scotia general election
Party	Candidate	Votes	%	±%
Progressive Conservative	David Morse	3,890	40.23	
Liberal	Robbie Harrison	3,213	33.23	
New Democratic Party	Mary DeWolfe	2,567	26.55	
