= Medford, Nova Scotia =

Medford
- Community
- Location within Nova Scotia
- Coordinates: 45°10′N 64°21′W
- Country: Canada
- Province: Nova Scotia

Medford is a community in the Canadian province of Nova Scotia, located in Kings County. It lies north of Kingsport, Nova Scotia on the Minas Basin.
