= Edward Twohig =

Canadian politician

Edward Twohig MLA

MLA for Kings North
- In office 1978–1984
- Preceded by: Glenn Ells
- Succeeded by: George Archibald

Personal details
- Party: Progressive Conservative (provincial) Canadian Future Party (federal)

Edward Twohig is a former Member of the Legislative Assembly of Nova Scotia, Canada for the constituency of Kings North. He sat as a member of the Progressive Conservative Party of Nova Scotia from 1978 to 1984.

Twohig was first elected in 1978, and was re-elected in 1981. He did not re-offer in 1984.
