= Baxters Harbour =

Community in Nova Scotia, Canada

Coordinates: 45°13′45″N 64°31′05″W

Baxter's Harbour in Nova Scotia

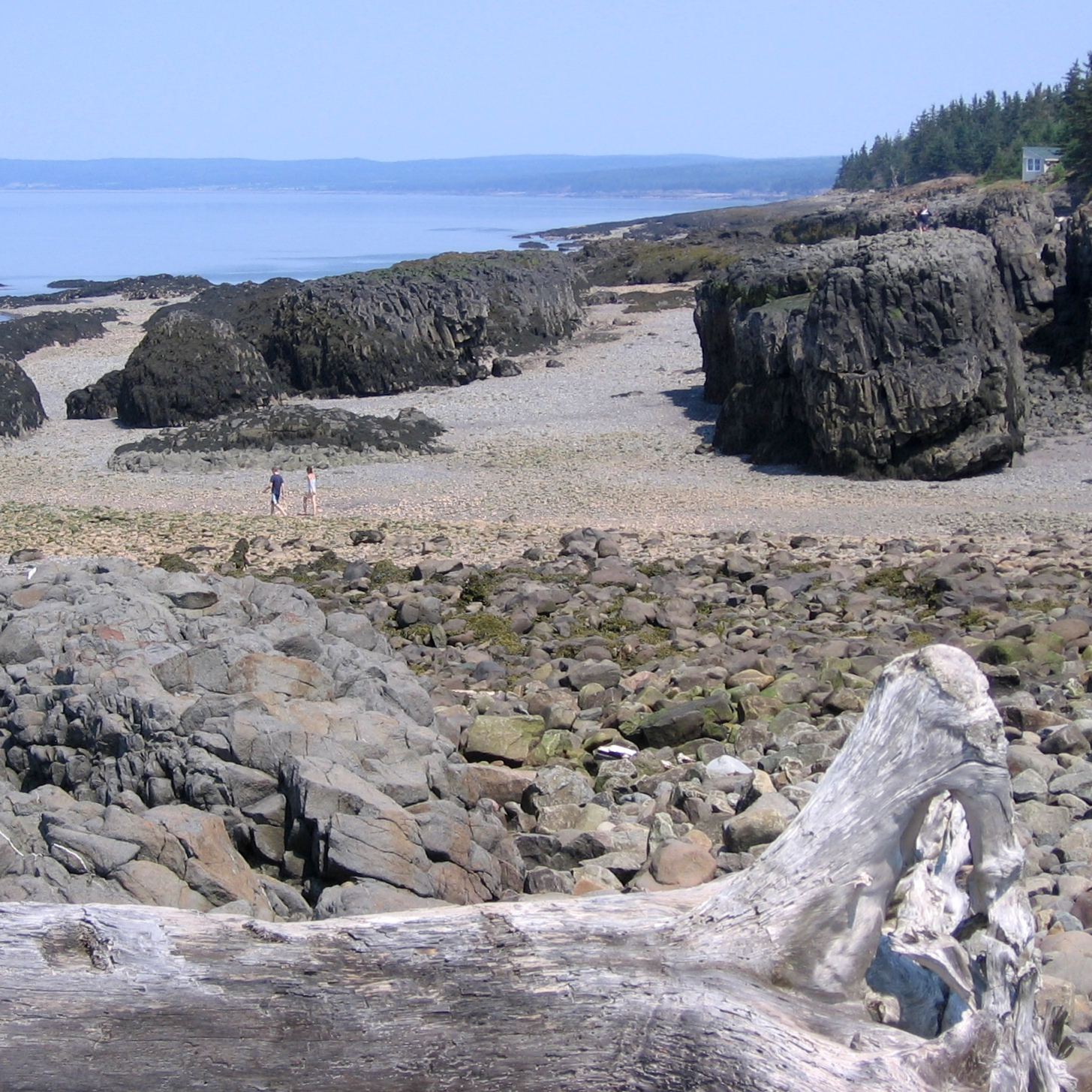
Low tide at Baxters Harbour

Baxters Harbour is a former fishing community on the shore of the Bay of Fundy in Kings County, Nova Scotia, Canada, located 15 kilometres from Kentville. It was named for Dr. William Baxter and his son John Baxter who lived there in the early nineteenth century. It is believed that fishing started there about 1780.

Today it consists mainly of summer residences and there is some farming in the upland area. There is also a Christian religious retreat in Baxters Harbour that operates in summer. Earlier wharves have disappeared and only pleasure craft now use the tiny harbour. At low tide columnar basalt lava is revealed on the rock and cobble beach. These columnar basalts were formed during volcanic activity of the Fundy Basin about 201 million years ago. A waterfall is located on the south end of the beach.
