= Kings—Hants =

Federal electoral district in Nova Scotia, Canada

Nova Scotia electoral district
- Interactive map of riding boundaries from the 2025 federal election

Federal electoral district
- Legislature: House of Commons
MP
Kody Blois
Liberal
- District created: 1966
- First contested: 1968
- Last contested: 2025
- District webpage: profile, map

Demographics
- Population (2021): 87,744
- Electors (2025): 81,110
- Area (km²): 4,124
- Pop. density (per km²): 21.3
- Census division(s): Hants, Kings
- Census subdivision(s): Kings (part), East Hants, West Hants, Kentville, Wolfville, Indian Brook, Berwick, Annapolis Valley, Glooscap

Kings—Hants (formerly Annapolis Valley—Hants and Annapolis Valley) is a federal electoral district in Nova Scotia, Canada, that has been represented in the House of Commons of Canada since 1968.

== Demographics ==
Historical population
Year	Pop.	±%
2001	79,286	—
2006	81,531	+2.8%
2011	83,306	+2.2%
2016	83,465	+0.2%
2021	87,744	+5.1%

According to the 2021 Canadian census; 2023 representation

Racial groups: 90.5% White, 5.4% Indigenous, 1.8% Black
Languages: 95.6% English, 1.7% French
Religions: 53.1% Christian (13.8% Catholic, 11.2% Baptist, 8.7% United Church, 8.6% Anglican, 1.1% Presbyterian, 9.7% Other), 45.1% No religion
Median income (2020): $36,800
Average income (2015): $44,520

== Geography ==
The district includes all of Hants County and the eastern part of Kings County. Communities include Enfield, Elmsdale, Lantz, Kentville, Windsor and Wolfville.

== History ==
The electoral district was created as "Annapolis Valley" in 1966 from parts of Colchester—Hants and Digby—Annapolis—Kings ridings. It was composed of the eastern portion of Annapolis County, and all of Kings and Hants counties.

In 1978, it lost the eastern portion of Annapolis County to South West Nova.

In 1996, it was renamed "Kings—Hants". In 2003, it was given its current boundaries: the area encompassed by the provincial electoral district of Kings West was removed from Kings—Hants and added to West Nova. There was no territory changes as a result of the 2012 federal electoral redistribution.

Following the 2022 Canadian federal electoral redistribution, the riding gained some territory (Berwick area) in Kings County from West Nova.

=== Members of Parliament ===
This riding has elected the following members of Parliament:

Parliament	Years	Member	Party
Annapolis Valley; Riding created from Colchester—Hants and Digby—Annapolis—Kings
28th	1968–1972	Pat Nowlan	Progressive Conservative
29th	1972–1974	Pat Nowlan	Progressive Conservative
30th	1974–1979	Pat Nowlan	Progressive Conservative
Annapolis Valley—Hants
31st	1979–1980	Pat Nowlan	Progressive Conservative
32nd	1980–1984	Pat Nowlan	Progressive Conservative
33rd	1984–1988	Pat Nowlan	Progressive Conservative
34th	1988–1990	Pat Nowlan	Progressive Conservative
34th	1990–1993	Pat Nowlan	Independent
35th	1993–1997	John Murphy	Liberal
Kings—Hants
36th	1997–2000	Scott Brison	Progressive Conservative
36th	2000–2000	Joe Clark	Progressive Conservative
37th	2000–2003	Scott Brison	Progressive Conservative
37th	2003–2004	Scott Brison	Liberal
38th	2004–2006	Scott Brison	Liberal
39th	2006–2008	Scott Brison	Liberal
40th	2008–2011	Scott Brison	Liberal
41st	2011–2015	Scott Brison	Liberal
42nd	2015–2019	Scott Brison	Liberal
43rd	2019–2021	Kody Blois	Liberal
44th	2021–2025	Kody Blois	Liberal
45th	2025–present	Kody Blois	Liberal

Scott Brison resigned his seat effective 10 February 2019. Under legislation that had recently come into effect, the seat remained vacant until the next general election.

== Election results ==
=== Kings—Hants ===
==== 2025 ====
2025 Canadian federal election
Party	Candidate	Votes	%	±%	Expenditures
Liberal	Kody Blois	35,836	60.56	+16.16	$126,680.47
Conservative	Joel Hirtle	19,773	33.41	+3.17	$78,772.70
New Democratic	Paul Doerr	2,154	3.64	-15.26	$9,273.85
Green	Karen Beazley	825	1.39	-0.54	$3,189.67
People's	Alexander Cargill	591	1.00	-3.53	$24.00
Total valid votes		59,179	99.35	–0.11	$128,510.56
Total rejected ballots		388	0.65	+0.11	
Turnout		59,567	73.02	+10.78	
Eligible voters		81,581			
Liberal notional hold		Swing		+6.50	
Source: Elections Canada
Note: number of eligible voters does not include voting day registrations.

==== 2021 ====
2021 federal election redistributed results
Party	Vote	%
Liberal	21,582	44.39
Conservative	14,704	30.25
New Democratic	9,186	18.90
People's	2,202	4.53
Green	940	1.93
Total valid votes	48,614	99.46
Rejected ballots	265	0.54
Registered voters/ estimated turnout	78,544	62.23

2021 Canadian federal election
Party	Candidate	Votes	%	±%	Expenditures
Liberal	Kody Blois	20,192	44.92	+1.61	$80,518.90
Conservative	Mark Parent	13,234	29.44	+4.66	$54,740.13
New Democratic	Stephen Schneider	8,645	19.23	+2.05	$13,834.66
People's	Steven Ford	1,945	4.33	+2.69	$0.00
Green	Sheila G. Richardson	940	2.09	-10.46	$4,644.16
Total valid votes/expense limit		44,956	100.00	–	$107,126.60
Total rejected ballots		251			
Turnout		45,207	63.42	-5.34	
Registered voters		71,285			
Liberal hold		Swing		-1.53	
Source: Elections Canada

==== 2019 ====
2019 Canadian federal election
Party	Candidate	Votes	%	±%	Expenditures
Liberal	Kody Blois	20,806	43.31	−27.43	$62,750.09
Conservative	Martha MacQuarrie	11,905	24.78	+6.20	$48,454.21
New Democratic	Stephen Schneider	8,254	17.18	+10.76	$28,020.03
Green	Brogan Anderson	6,029	12.55	+9.19	$12,592.53
People's	Matthew Southall	786	1.64	New	$3,504.18
Rhinoceros	Nicholas Tan	138	0.29	−0.11	none listed
Veterans Coalition	Stacey Dodge	118	0.25	New	$0.00
Total valid votes/expense limit		48,036	99.32		$101,328.14
Total rejected ballots		327	0.68	+0.25	
Turnout		48,363	68.76	−1.00	
Eligible voters		70,332			
Liberal hold		Swing		−16.81	
Source: Elections Canada

==== 2015 ====
2015 Canadian federal election
Party	Candidate	Votes	%	±%	Expenditures
Liberal	Scott Brison	33,026	70.74	+31.19	$88,355.31
Conservative	David Morse	8,677	18.59	–18.05	$80,877.49
New Democratic	Hugh Curry	2,998	6.42	–13.60	$15,831.09
Green	Will Cooper	1,569	3.36	–0.42	$1,277.65
Rhinoceros	Megan Brown-Hodges	184	0.39	–	$730.27
Independent	Edd Twohig	132	0.28	–	$1,070.96
Independent	Cliff James Williams	100	0.21	–	–
Total valid votes/Expense limit		46,686	99.57		$200,775.69
Total rejected ballots		202	0.43		
Turnout		46,888	70.56		
Eligible voters		66,454			
Liberal hold		Swing		+24.62	
Source: Elections Canada

==== 2011 ====
2011 Canadian federal election
Party	Candidate	Votes	%	±%	Expenditures
Liberal	Scott Brison	15,887	39.56	-4.62	$74,312.84
Conservative	David Morse	14,714	36.63	+10.49	$79,610.04
New Democratic	Mark Rogers	8,043	20.03	-1.98	$30,929.92
Green	Sheila Richardson	1,520	3.78	-2.46	$1,566.57
Total valid votes/Expense limit		40,164	100.0		$82,155.51
Total rejected, unmarked and declined ballots		200	0.50	+0.01	
Turnout		40,364	61.76	+3.17	
Eligible voters		65,355			
Liberal hold		Swing		-7.56	

==== 2008 ====
2008 Canadian federal election
Party	Candidate	Votes	%	±%	Expenditures
Liberal	Scott Brison	16,641	44.18	-1.38	$57,579.50
Conservative	Rosemary Segado	9,846	26.14	-6.05	$59,850.46
New Democratic	Carol Harris	8,291	22.01	+2.99	$19,364.79
Green	Brendan MacNeill	2,353	6.24	+4.04	$2,914.98
Christian Heritage	Jim Hnatiuk	528	1.40	–	$11,240.76
Total valid votes/Expense limit		37,659	100.0		$79,171
Total rejected, unmarked and declined ballots		187	0.49	+0.08	
Turnout		37,846	58.59	-6.60	
Eligible voters		64,593			
Liberal hold		Swing		+2.34	

==== 2006 ====
2006 Canadian federal election
Party	Candidate	Votes	%	±%	Expenditures
Liberal	Scott Brison	19,491	45.56	-1.05	$74,044.26
Conservative	Bob Mullan	13,772	32.19	+2.07	$65,675.63
New Democratic	Mary Dewolfe	8,138	19.02	+1.33	$19,691.41
Green	Sheila Richardson	947	2.21	-1.41	$1,181.00
Marijuana	Chummy Anthony	436	1.02	–	none listed
Total valid votes/Expense limit		42,784	100.0		$74,073
Total rejected, unmarked and declined ballots		177	0.41	-0.35	
Turnout		42,961	65.19	+2.77	
Eligible voters		65,898			
Liberal hold		Swing		-1.56	

==== 2004 ====
2004 Canadian federal election
Party	Candidate	Votes	%	±%	Expenditures
Liberal	Scott Brison	17,555	46.61	+16.11	$68,487.35
Conservative	Bob Mullan	11,344	30.12	-19.42	$64,737.24
New Democratic	Skip Hambling	6,663	17.69	+0.08	$24,085.01
Green	Kevin Stacey	1,364	3.62	–	$2,710.55
Christian Heritage	Jim Hnatiuk	493	1.31	–	$7,088.07
Independent	Richard Hennigar	242	0.64	+0.34	$5,710.00
Total valid votes/Expense limit		37,661	100.0		$70,804
Total rejected, unmarked and declined ballots		289	0.76		
Turnout		37,950	62.42		
Eligible voters		60,801			
Liberal gain from Progressive Conservative		Swing		+18.56	
Changes from 2000 are based on redistributed results. Changes for Liberal candidate Scott Brison from 2000 are based on the Liberal Party's results. He received +6.48% votes from his results as a Progressive Conservative. Conservative Party change is based on the combination of Canadian Alliance and Progressive Conservative Party totals. Change for independent candidate Richard Hennigar is based on his 2000 results as a Natural Law candidate (results not redistributed).

2000 federal election redistributed results
Party	Vote	%
Progressive Conservative	14,130	40.13
Liberal	10,741	30.50
New Democratic	6,202	17.61
Alliance	3,315	9.41
Others	826	2.35

==== 2000 ====
2000 Canadian federal election
Party	Candidate	Votes	%	±%
Progressive Conservative	Scott Brison	17,612	40.29	-13.16
Liberal	Claude O'Hara	13,213	30.23	-0.03
New Democratic	Kaye Johnson	7,244	16.57	-10.57
Alliance	Gerry Fulton	4,618	10.56	-5.58
Marijuana	Jim King	669	1.53	
Independent	Kenneth MacEachern	140	0.32	
Natural Law	Richard Hennigar	133	0.30	-0.28
Communist	Graham Jake MacDonald	85	0.19	-0.33
Total valid votes		43,714	100.00	

All changes are based on the 2000 by-election, except the Liberal Party and the Natural Law Party, which did not field a candidate; and Communist Party candidate Graham Jake MacDonald, who ran as an independent.

==== 2000 by-election ====
Canadian federal by-election, September 11, 2000 Resignation of Scott Brison on July 24, 2000
Party	Candidate	Votes	%	±%	Expenditures
Progressive Conservative	Joe Clark	14,525	53.45	+17.18	$38,552
New Democratic	Kaye Johnson	7,375	27.14	+8.17	$45,722
Alliance	Gerry Fulton	4,385	16.14	+2.75	$40,044
Marijuana	Alex Néron	670	2.47		$371
Independent	John Turmel	221	0.81		$0
Total valid votes		27,176	100.00		
Total rejected ballots		232			
Turnout		27,408	39.54		
Electors on the lists		69,319			
Elections Canada and Financial Returns, Elections Canada. Canadian Alliance percentages are contrasted with the Reform Party figures from 1997.

==== 1997 ====
1997 Canadian federal election
Party	Candidate	Votes	%	±%
Progressive Conservative	Scott Brison	17,401	36.27	+16.04
Liberal	John Murphy	14,515	30.26	-9.23
New Democratic	Philip A. Brown	9,101	18.97	+13.97
Reform	Lloyd Schmidt	6,424	13.39	+0.57
Natural Law	James McLelland	278	0.58	-0.47
Independent	Graham Jake MacDonald	251	0.52	
Total valid votes		47,970	100.00	

=== Annapolis Valley—Hants ===
==== 1993 ====
1993 Canadian federal election
Party	Candidate	Votes	%	±%
Liberal	John Murphy	18,238	39.49	-0.59
Progressive Conservative	Jim White	9,344	20.23	-23.94
Independent	Pat Nowlan	8,958	19.40	-24.77
Reform	John Merriam	5,919	12.82	
New Democratic	Dick Terfry	2,308	5.00	-7.52
Christian Heritage	Jack Enserink	614	1.33	-1.47
National	Steve Mockford	484	1.05	
Natural Law	John Runkle	319	0.69	
Total valid votes		46,184	100.00	

Changes from the 1988 election for both Progressive Conservative candidate Jim White and Independent candidate Pat Nowlan are based on the same 1988 result, when Pat Nowlan ran as a Progressive Conservative. Independent Rik Gates was the youngest candidate to run for MP at the age of twenty two.

==== 1988 ====
1988 Canadian federal election
Party	Candidate	Votes	%	±%
Progressive Conservative	Pat Nowlan	20,763	44.17	-9.68
Liberal	John Murphy	18,840	40.08	+11.62
New Democratic	Keith Collins	5,886	12.52	-3.43
Christian Heritage	Jack Enserink	1,318	2.80	
Independent	Rik Gates	200	0.43	
Total valid votes		47,007	100.00	

==== 1984 ====
1984 Canadian federal election
Party	Candidate	Votes	%	±%
Progressive Conservative	Pat Nowlan	23,580	53.85	+11.88
Liberal	Howard Fuller	12,463	28.46	-2.87
New Democratic	Peggy Hope-Simpson	6,987	15.95	-9.34
Rhinoceros	Graham Macdermott	762	1.74	+0.90
Total valid votes		43,792	100.00	

==== 1980 ====
1980 Canadian federal election
Party	Candidate	Votes	%	±%
Progressive Conservative	Pat Nowlan	17,152	41.97	-8.15
Liberal	Jim Munro	12,804	31.33	+1.41
New Democratic	Bob Levy	10,338	25.29	+5.33
Rhinoceros	Mark Moors	343	0.84	
Independent	Dick Killam	233	0.57	
Total valid votes		40,870	100.00	

==== 1979 ====
1979 Canadian federal election
Party	Candidate	Votes	%	±%
Progressive Conservative	Pat Nowlan	20,103	50.12	-2.40
Liberal	Frank C. Bezanson	12,001	29.92	-13.12
New Democratic	Bob Levy	8,008	19.96	+16.22
Total valid votes		40,112	100.00	

=== Annapolis Valley ===
==== 1974 ====
1974 Canadian federal election
Party	Candidate	Votes	%	±%
Progressive Conservative	Pat Nowlan	19,174	52.52	-5.95
Liberal	Brian Bruce	15,712	43.04	+7.33
New Democratic	John Patrick O'Meara	1,366	3.74	-1.25
Marxist–Leninist	Ronald John Brunton	135	0.37	
Social Credit	Frank Dimock	121	0.33	-0.50
Total valid votes		36508	100.00	

==== 1972 ====
1972 Canadian federal election
Party	Candidate	Votes	%	±%
Progressive Conservative	Pat Nowlan	20,962	58.47	+1.84
Liberal	Tom Calkin	12,800	35.71	-4.39
New Democratic	Virginia Pickett	1,788	4.99	+1.72
Social Credit	W. Lincoln Hatt	299	0.83	
Total valid votes		35849	100.00	

==== 1968 ====
1968 Canadian federal election
Party	Candidate	Votes	%}
Progressive Conservative	Pat Nowlan	17,435	56.64
Liberal	Alexander C. Williamson	12,342	40.09
New Democratic	Donald L. McKay	1,007	3.27
Total valid votes		30784	100.00

== See also ==
- List of Canadian electoral districts
- Historical federal electoral districts of Canada
