= Ross Corner, Nova Scotia =

Community in Nova Scotia, Canada

Coordinates: 45°8′51.92″N 64°39′0.13″W

Ross Corner in Nova Scotia

Ross Corner is a community in the Canadian province of Nova Scotia, located in Kings County.
