= 2022 Prince Edward Island Liberal Party leadership election =

Prince Edward Island Liberal Party leadership election

- Date: November 19, 2022
- Convention: East Wiltshire Intermediate School, Cornwall, Prince Edward Island
- Resigning leader: Wade MacLauchlan
- Won by: Sharon Cameron
- Candidates: 1

The 2022 Prince Edward Island Liberal Party leadership election took place on November 19, 2022 (after being postponed from November 13, 2021) to elect a new leader of the Prince Edward Island Liberal Party. The contest was prompted by the resignation of Wade MacLauchlan, who stepped down after the party's poor showing in the 2019 general election, where it fell to third place. On September 23, 2021, the leadership election was postponed indefinitely, but on July 11, 2022, the new date was announced. On October 7, 2022 the party announced that Sharon Cameron, having been the only candidate to enter the race by the close of nominations, would be acclaimed as leader at the convention.

== Timeline ==
=== 2019 ===
- May 8 – Wade MacLauchlan resigns as leader of the Liberal Party. Robert Mitchell is selected as interim leader.
- September 9 – Robert Mitchell resigns as interim leader.
- September 16 – Sonny Gallant becomes the interim leader.

=== 2020 ===
- August 21 – Interim leader Sonny Gallant announces the party is forming a leadership selection committee to develop the timing and rules for a leadership election.

=== 2021 ===
- July 15 – Party leadership election called for November 13, 2021.
- September 23 – Party leadership election postponed.

=== 2022 ===
- July 11 – Party leadership election called for November 19, 2022.
- July 29 – Co-chairs Julia O'Hanley and Samantha MacLean announced.
- September 22 – Sharon Cameron announced her candidacy.
- October 2 – Close of nominations.
- October 7 – Sharon Cameron, as the only candidate in the race, is announced as leader-designate.
- November 19 – Party leadership election held, with Sharon Cameron acclaimed as leader.

== Candidates ==
=== Declared ===
==== Sharon Cameron ====
Sharon Cameron served as a deputy minister during the governments of Robert Ghiz and Wade MacLauchlan, first at the Department of Social Services and Seniors (2010–2015) and then at the Department of Workforce and Advanced Learning (2015–2019). Additionally, she served as a special advisor to MacLauchlan on social policy, and is the former CEO of the Workers Compensation Board. In 2021, Cameron sought the Liberal nomination in Cornwall-Meadowbank following the resignation of Heath MacDonald; Cameron lost the nomination to Jane MacIsaac, who in turn lost the by-election to Progressive Conservative candidate Mark McLane.

=== Declined ===
- Heath MacDonald, MP for Malpeque (2021–present); Minister of Finance (2019), Minister of Economic Development and Tourism (2015–2018); MLA for Cornwall-Meadowbank (2015–2021)
- Robert Mitchell, interim party leader (2019); Minister of Health and Wellness (2018–2019), Minister of Communities, Land and Environment (2015–2018); MLA for Charlottetown-Sherwood (2007–2019), MLA for Charlottetown-Winsloe (2019–2020)
