= 2026 Prince Edward Island Liberal Party leadership election =

Prince Edward Island Liberal Party leadership election

- October 25, 2026
	DK
Candidate	Dan Kutcher
Results	Acclaimed
Leader before election
Hal Perry (interim)
Leader after election
Dan Kutcher

2026 Prince Edward Island Liberal Party leadership election
- Date: October 25, 2026
- Convention: Delta Convention Centre, Charlottetown
- Resigning leader: Robert Mitchell
- Won by: Dan Kutcher
- Candidates: 1
- Entrance fee: $25,000
- Spending limit: $50,000

On October 25, 2026, the Prince Edward Island Liberal Party held a leadership election to elect a permanent successor to Hal Perry, who became interim leader following the resignation of Robert Mitchell. It resulted in the acclamation of Dan Kutcher.

== Background ==
The contest was prompted by the resignation of Robert Mitchell, who stepped down after losing the 2025 Georgetown-Pownal provincial by-election and the 2026 Cornwall-Meadowbank provincial by-election.

The leadership was won by former Summerside mayor Dan Kutcher, who was acclaimed. He officially became leader-designate on September 5, and formally became leader at the party's convention on October 25, 2026.

== Timeline ==
- July 16, 2026 – Robert Mitchell resigns as leader of the Liberal Party. Hal Perry is selected as interim leader.
- August 6, 2026 – Party announces the rules and procedures for the election.
- September 4, 2026 – Last day for candidates to declare. First candidate entrance fee installment due.
- September 18, 2026 – Second candidate entrance fee installment due.
- October 13, 2026 – Last day to join the party in order to be eligible to vote.
- October 25, 2026 – Leadership convention.

== Candidates ==
=== Declared ===
- Dan Kutcher, mayor of Summerside (2022–2026)

=== Declined ===
- Heath MacDonald, MP for Malpeque (2021–present), MLA for Cornwall-Meadowbank (2015–2021)
- Carolyn Simpson, MLA for Charlottetown-Hillsborough Park (2025–present)
