= 2026 Cornwall-Meadowbank provincial by-election =

Prince Edward Island, Canada byelection

- July 13, 2026

Riding of Cornwall-Meadowbank
- Turnout: 60.79% (▼7.70)
| | First party | Second party | Third party |
|---|---|---|---|
| | GRN | LIB | PC |
| Candidate | Tayte Willows | Robert Mitchell | Caley McDonald |
| Party | Green | Liberal | Progressive Conservative |
| Popular vote | 1,184 | 955 | 823 |
| Percentage | 39.65% | 31.98% | 27.56% |
| Swing | ▲15.40 | ▲12.86 | ▼27.19 |
MLA before election
Mark McLane
Progressive Conservative
Elected MLA
Tayte Willows
Green

A by-election was held on July 13, 2026, to elect a member of the Legislative Assembly (MLA) to represent Cornwall-Meadowbank in the Legislative Assembly of Prince Edward Island for the remainder of the 67th General Assembly, following the death of Progressive Conservative MLA Mark McLane.

The race was won by Green Party candidate Tayte Willows. The result marked the second consecutive by-election defeat for Liberal leader Robert Mitchell since becoming party leader. He resigned as party leader 3 days later.

== Candidates ==
=== Progressive Conservative Party ===
On June 16, 2026, registered massage therapist and small business owner Caley McDonald was announced as the Progressive Conservative candidate for the by-election. McDonald has served as president of the North River Minor Hockey Association.

=== Green Party ===
On June 16, Tayte Willows, the Green Party's candidate in the 2023 provincial election, was announced as the party's candidate for the by-election. Willows is a community volunteer who has been involved with local organizations, including the Canadian Mental Health Association.

=== Liberal Party ===
Robert Mitchell, leader of the Prince Edward Island Liberal Party, was announced as the party's candidate for the by-election on June 16. Mitchell previously served as an MLA and cabinet minister under Wade MacLauchlan's premiership, and was elected Liberal leader in October 2025.

=== New Democratic Party ===
The New Democratic Party nominated Craig Nash, a former military member, small business owner, and the party's candidate for Cornwall-Meadowbank in the 2019 general election. Nash previously ran as the federal NDP candidate in Malpeque during the 2019 Canadian federal election.

== Results ==
Prince Edward Island provincial by-election, July 13, 2026: Cornwall-Meadowbank Death of Mark McLane
| Party | Candidate | Votes | % | ±% |
|---|---|---|---|---|
| Green | Tayte Willows | 1,184 | 39.65 | +15.40 |
| Liberal | Robert Mitchell | 955 | 31.98 | +12.86 |
| Progressive Conservative | Caley McDonald | 823 | 27.56 | –27.19 |
| New Democratic | Craig Nash | 24 | 0.80 | –1.07 |
| Total valid votes | | 2,986 | 99.87 | |
| Total rejected ballots | | 4 | 0.13 | –0.37 |
| Turnout | | 2,990 | 60.87 | –7.62 |
| Eligible voters | | 4,912 | | |
| Green gain from Progressive Conservative | | Swing | | +21.30 |
Source: Elections PEI

=== Results by poll ===
| Poll | Poll name | McDonald | Mitchell | Nash | Willows | Vote Total |
|---|---|---|---|---|---|---|
| Advance | | 408 | 590 | 13 | 643 | 1,654 |
| 1 | Chateau Estates | 29 | 22 | 0 | 30 | 81 |
| 2 | Candlelight Park | 78 | 42 | 1 | 64 | 185 |
| 3 | East Wiltshire | 34 | 43 | 0 | 55 | 132 |
| 4 | Park Street | 26 | 45 | 0 | 69 | 140 |
| 5 | Brookside | 16 | 24 | 0 | 41 | 81 |
| 6 | Lowther | 53 | 60 | 6 | 108 | 227 |
| 7 | Primrose Point | 100 | 68 | 2 | 77 | 247 |
| 8 | Bonavista | 38 | 37 | 1 | 54 | 130 |
| 9 | Meadowbank | 41 | 24 | 1 | 43 | 109 |

== Previous result ==
2023 Prince Edward Island general election: Cornwall-Meadowbank
| Party | Candidate | Votes | % | ±% |
|---|---|---|---|---|
| Progressive Conservative | Mark McLane | 1,750 | 54.76 | +14.74 |
| Green | Tayte Willows | 775 | 24.25 | +0.86 |
| Liberal | Don Leary | 611 | 19.12 | -14.09 |
| New Democratic | Larry Hale | 60 | 1.88 | -1.50 |
| Total valid votes | | 3,196 | 99.50 | |
| Total rejected ballots | | 16 | 0.50 | |
| Turnout | | 3,212 | 68.49 | +13.10 |
| Eligible voters | | 4,690 | | |
| Progressive Conservative hold | | Swing | | +6.94 |
