= Sharon Cameron =

Canadian politician

Leader of the Prince Edward Island Liberal Party
- In office November 19, 2022 – April 6, 2023
- Preceded by: Sonny Gallant (interim)
- Succeeded by: Hal Perry (interim)

Personal details
- Born: Amherst, Nova Scotia
- Party: Liberal

Sharon Emily Cameron is a Canadian politician and former civil servant, who was the leader of the Prince Edward Island Liberal Party from November 19, 2022 to April 6, 2023.

Prior to her work in government, Cameron worked as an intermediate school principal in Charlottetown, Prince Edward Island.

In 2010, Cameron was appointed deputy minister of social services and seniors in the government of Robert Ghiz, and in 2015 she was appointed deputy minister of workforce and advanced learning by Ghiz's successor, Wade MacLauchlan. Additionally, she was CEO of the Workers Compensation Board and as an advisor to MacLauchlan on social policy. On September 22, 2022, following MacLauchlan's defeat in the 2019 election and subsequent resignation as Liberal leader, she announced her campaign to replace him. As the only candidate in the race by the close of nominations on October 2, the party announced on October 7 that Cameron would be acclaimed as leader at the convention on November 19. Cameron had previously sought the Liberal nomination in Cornwall-Meadowbank ahead of the riding's 2021 by-election, losing to Jane MacIsaac. Cameron led the Liberal Party in the April 3, 2023 general election where they won the party's lowest ever share of the popular vote with 17.2% but ended up as the official opposition despite dropping from four seats to three. Cameron, who finished third in her race in New Haven-Rocky Point, announced on April 6 that she had resigned as party leader.
