= Lawrence MacAulay =

Canadian politician (born 1946)

The Honourable Lawrence MacAulay PC
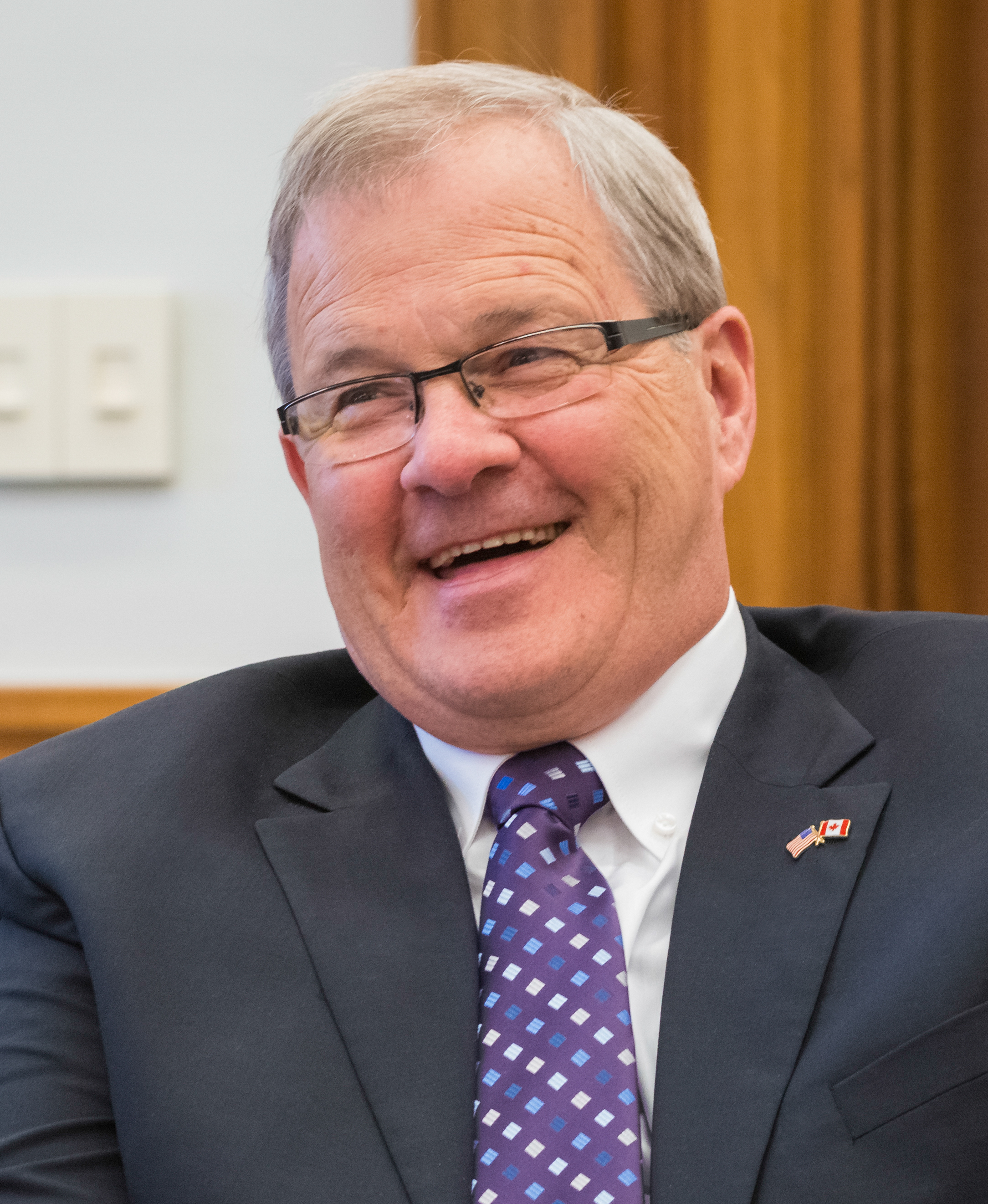
- MacAulay in 2016

Minister of Agriculture and Agri-Food
- In office July 26, 2023 – March 14, 2025
- Prime Minister: Justin Trudeau
- Preceded by: Marie-Claude Bibeau
- Succeeded by: Kody Blois
- In office November 4, 2015 – March 1, 2019
- Prime Minister: Justin Trudeau
- Preceded by: Gerry Ritz
- Succeeded by: Marie-Claude Bibeau

Minister of Veterans Affairs Associate Minister of National Defence
- In office March 1, 2019 – July 26, 2023
- Prime Minister: Justin Trudeau
- Preceded by: Jody Wilson-Raybould
- Succeeded by: Ginette Petitpas Taylor

Solicitor General of Canada
- In office November 23, 1998 – October 22, 2002
- Prime Minister: Jean Chrétien
- Preceded by: Andy Scott
- Succeeded by: Wayne Easter

Minister of Labour
- In office June 11, 1997 – November 23, 1998
- Prime Minister: Jean Chrétien
- Preceded by: Alfonso Gagliano
- Succeeded by: Claudette Bradshaw

Member of Parliament for Cardigan
- In office November 21, 1988 – April 28, 2025
- Preceded by: Pat Binns
- Succeeded by: Kent MacDonald

Personal details
- Born: September 9, 1946 (age 79) St. Peters Bay, Prince Edward Island, Canada
- Party: Liberal
- Profession: Politician; farmer

Lawrence A. MacAulay PC (born September 9, 1946) is a Canadian politician, who represented the riding of Cardigan, Prince Edward Island in the House of Commons from 1988 until 2025.

On June 11, 1997, he joined the cabinet of Prime Minister Jean Chrétien as Minister of Labour and Minister responsible for Prince Edward Island. In 1998, he was appointed Solicitor General of Canada and served in that role until his resignation from Cabinet on October 21, 2002, during a conflict of interest inquiry. MacAuley served as a Liberal backbench member of Parliament (MP) through the rest of the Liberal years in power and as an opposition member during the Conservative government led by Stephen Harper (2006–2015). He is the former Secretary of State (Veterans) and Secretary of State (Atlantic Canada Opportunities Agency). He was also the Official Opposition Critic for Seniors.

On March 20, 2014, MacAulay became the longest-serving MP in the history of Prince Edward Island, surpassing the record previously set by Angus MacLean.

On November 4, 2015, he was appointed the Minister of Agriculture and Agri-Food by the new prime minister Justin Trudeau. On March 1, 2019, Trudeau shuffled his cabinet, appointing MacAulay as Minister of Veterans Affairs and Associate Minister of National Defence. On July 26, 2023, Trudeau shuffled his cabinet, appointing MacAulay as Minister of Agriculture for the second time.

On March 1, 2025, MacAulay announced he wouldn't be seeking re-election in 2025 for Cardigan.

MacAulay lives in Midgell, Prince Edward Island with his wife, Frances.

== Controversy ==
In December 2022, MacAulay was confronted in parliament by other MPs on multiple reports of Veterans Affairs Canada offering medical assistance in dying (MAID) to veterans seeking medical care. Prime Minister Justin Trudeau described the incidents as "absolutely unacceptable".

== Electoral record ==
2021 Canadian federal election: Cardigan
Party	Candidate	Votes	%	±%	Expenditures
Liberal	Lawrence MacAulay	11,175	50.58	+1.23	$47,596.44
Conservative	Wayne Phelan	6,817	30.85	+1.81	$38,354.38
New Democratic	Lynne Thiele	2,168	9.81	+3.13	$3,739.79
Green	Michael MacLean	1,064	4.82	-9.02	$5,906.70
People's	Kevin Hardy	725	3.28	–	$1,431.55
Christian Heritage	Fred MacLeod	145	0.66	-0.43	$627.12
Total valid votes/expense limit		21,994	99.11	–	$90,511.54
Total rejected ballots		199	0.89	-0.14	
Turnout		22,293	72.28	-2.71	
Eligible voters		30,843			
Liberal hold		Swing		-0.29	
Source: Elections Canada

2019 Canadian federal election: Cardigan
Party	Candidate	Votes	%	±%	Expenditures
Liberal	Lawrence MacAulay	10,939	49.35	−15.68	$42,720.95
Conservative	Wayne Phelan	6,439	29.05	+12.89	none listed
Green	Glen Beaton	3,068	13.84	+7.46	$13,490.35
New Democratic	Lynne Thiele	1,481	6.68	−4.45	$0.00
Christian Heritage	Christene Squires	240	1.08	−0.23	$278.30
Total valid votes/expense limit		22,167	98.96		$85,990.53
Total rejected ballots		232	1.04	+0.61	
Turnout		22,399	74.99	−3.17	
Eligible voters		29,869			
Liberal hold		Swing		−14.29	
Source: Elections Canada

2015 Canadian federal election: Cardigan
Party	Candidate	Votes	%	±%	Expenditures
Liberal	Lawrence MacAulay	14,621	65.03	+15.40	$57,014.46
Conservative	Julius Patkai	3,632	16.15	–22.22	$36,428.35
New Democratic	Billy Cann	2,503	11.13	+0.84	$13,760.96
Green	Teresa Doyle	1,434	6.38	+4.61	$7,232.74
Christian Heritage	Christene Squires	295	1.31	–	$2,681.69
Total valid votes/expense limit		22,485	99.57		$170,761.91
Total rejected ballots		96	0.43	–0.08	
Turnout		22,581	78.16	-0.13	
Eligible voters		28,889			
Liberal hold		Swing		+18.81	
Source: Elections Canada

2011 Canadian federal election: Cardigan
Party	Candidate	Votes	%	±%	Expenditures
Liberal	Lawrence MacAulay	10,486	49.63	-3.18	$40,566.83
Conservative	Michael Currie	8,107	38.37	+8.48	$60,502.86
New Democratic	Lorne Cudmore	2,164	10.24	+2.11	$1,837.23
Green	Leslie Stewart	373	1.77	-1.96	$1,714.72
Total valid votes/expense limit		21,130	100.0	–	$69,835.73
Total rejected, unmarked and declined ballots		108	0.51	-0.02	
Turnout		21,238	78.29	+8.03	
Eligible voters		27,127			
Liberal hold		Swing		-5.83	

2008 Canadian federal election: Cardigan
Party	Candidate	Votes	%	±%	Expenditures
Liberal	Lawrence MacAulay	10,105	52.81	-3.35	$35,000.12
Conservative	Sid McMullin	5,661	29.59	-4.09	$29,907.51
New Democratic	Mike Avery	1,556	8.13	+0.66	$1,316.84
Independent	Larry McGuire	1,101	5.75	–	none listed
Green	Emma Daughton	710	3.71	+1.02	$2,546.13
Total valid votes/expense limit		19,133	100.0	–	$67,487
Total rejected, unmarked and declined ballots		101	0.53	-0.03	
Turnout		19,234	70.26	-5.07	
Eligible voters		27,374			
Liberal hold		Swing		+0.37	

2006 Canadian federal election: Cardigan
Party	Candidate	Votes	%	±%	Expenditures
Liberal	Lawrence MacAulay	11,542	56.16	+2.78	$38,353.41
Conservative	Don Gillis	6,923	33.68	+0.44	$62,756.67
New Democratic	Edith Perry	1,535	7.47	-2.68	$1,532.80
Green	Haida Arsenault-Antolick	553	2.69	-0.54	$679.02
Total valid votes/expense limit		20,533	100.0	–	$63,115
Total rejected, unmarked and declined ballots		116	0.56		
Turnout		20,649	75.33		
Eligible voters		27,411			
Liberal hold		Swing		+1.17	

2004 Canadian federal election: Cardigan
Party	Candidate	Votes	%	±%	Expenditures
Liberal	Lawrence MacAulay	11,064	53.38	+6.56	$54,157.07
Conservative	Peter McQuaid	6,889	33.24	-14.78	$59,824.10
New Democratic	Dave MacKinnon	2,103	10.15	+5.09	$20,929.08
Green	Jeremy Stiles	670	3.23	–	$1,315.34
Total valid votes/expense limit		20,726	100.0	–	$61,091
Total rejected, unmarked and declined ballots		137	0.66		
Turnout		20,863	76.2		
Eligible voters		27,656			
Liberal notional hold		Swing		+10.67	
Changes from 2000 are based on redistributed results. Change for the Conservatives is based on the combined totals of the Progressive Conservatives and the Canadian Alliance.

2000 Canadian federal election: Cardigan
Party	Candidate	Votes	%	±%
Liberal	Lawrence MacAulay	8,545	48.06	+3.01
Progressive Conservative	Kevin MacAdam	8,269	46.51	+2.05
Alliance	Darrell Hickox	500	2.81	
New Democratic	Deborah Kelly Hawkes	465	2.62	-7.88
Total valid votes		17,779	100.00	

1997 Canadian federal election: Cardigan
Party	Candidate	Votes	%	±%
Liberal	Lawrence MacAulay	7,555	45.05	-16.59
Progressive Conservative	Dan Hughes	7,456	44.46	+11.79
New Democratic	Larry Duchesne	1,761	10.50	+4.81
Total valid votes		16,772	100.00	

1993 Canadian federal election: Cardigan
Party	Candidate	Votes	%	±%
Liberal	Lawrence MacAulay	10,115	61.64	+10.02
Progressive Conservative	Wilbur MacDonald	5,360	32.67	-11.26
New Democratic	Reg Phelan	934	5.69	+1.23
Total valid votes		16,409	100.00	

1988 Canadian federal election: Cardigan
Party	Candidate	Votes	%	±%
Liberal	Lawrence MacAulay	9,325	51.62	+9.48
Progressive Conservative	Pat Binns	7,936	43.93	-9.43
New Democratic	Gertrude Partridge	805	4.46	-0.04
Total valid votes		18,066	100.00	

29th Canadian Ministry (2015–2025) – Cabinet of Justin Trudeau
Cabinet posts (3)
Predecessor	Office	Successor
Marie-Claude Bibeau	Minister of Agriculture and Agri-food; 2023–2025	Kody Blois (Minister of Agriculture and Agri-Food and Rural Economic Development)
Jody Wilson-Raybould	Minister of Veterans Affairs; 2019–2023	Ginette Petitpas Taylor
Gerry Ritz	Minister of Agriculture and Agri-food; 2015–2019	Marie-Claude Bibeau
26th Canadian Ministry (1993–2003) – Cabinet of Jean Chrétien
Cabinet posts (2)
Predecessor	Office	Successor
Andy Scott	Solicitor General of Canada; 1998–2002	Wayne Easter
Alfonso Gagliano	Minister of Labour; 1997–1998	Claudette Bradshaw
Sub-Cabinet Posts (2)
Predecessor	Title	Successor
new post replacing Secretary of State (Veterans) and Secretary of State (Atlantic Canada Opportunities Agency)	Secretary of State (Veterans) (Atlantic Canada Opportunities Agency) (1996–1997)	Fred Mifflin as Minister of State for Atlantic Canada Opportunities Agency and Minister of Veterans Affairs
	Secretary of State (Veterans) (1993–1996)	post replaced with Secretary of State (Veterans and Atlantic Canada Opportunities Agency)
