= Wayne Easter =

Canadian politician

The Honourable Wayne Easter PC
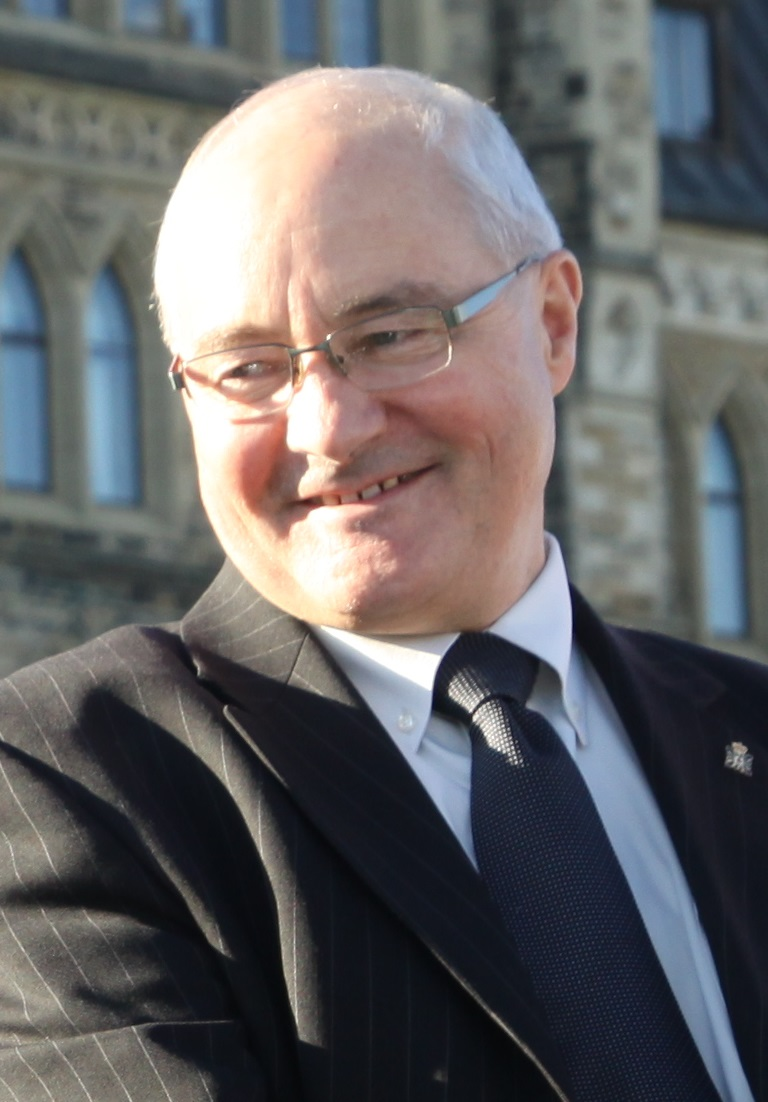

Member of Parliament for Malpeque
- In office October 25, 1993 – September 20, 2021
- Preceded by: Catherine Callbeck
- Succeeded by: Heath MacDonald

40th Solicitor General of Canada
- In office October 22, 2002 – December 11, 2003
- Preceded by: Lawrence MacAulay
- Succeeded by: Anne MacEllen

Chair of the Standing Committee on Finance
- In office February 4, 2016 – August 15, 2021
- Prime Minister: Justin Trudeau
- Preceded by: James Rajotte
- Succeeded by: Peter Fonseca

Personal details
- Born: June 22, 1949 (age 77) North Wiltshire, Prince Edward Island, Canada
- Party: Liberal
- Spouse: Helen Easter
- Education: Nova Scotia Agricultural; College

Wayne Easter PC (born June 22, 1949) is a Canadian former politician who represented the riding of Malpeque, Prince Edward Island from 1993 to 2021.

== Before politics ==
Born in North Wiltshire, Prince Edward Island, the son of A. Leith Easter and Hope MacLeod, he was educated at the Charlottetown Rural High School and the Nova Scotia Agricultural College. Easter received an honorary doctorate of law from University of Prince Edward Island in 1988 for his work and contribution to agriculture and social activism on a national and international level. He was awarded the Governor General's Canada 125 Medal in 1992 for community service. In 1970, he married Helen Arleighn Laird. Easter operated a dairy, beef and grain farm near North Wiltshire. He is a former president of the National Farmers Union.

Wayne and his wife Helen live in North Wiltshire and have two grown children.

== Federal politics ==
Easter served as a member of the Liberal Party of Canada in the House of Commons of Canada, representing the electoral district of Malpeque in the province of Prince Edward Island from 1993 to 2021.

Easter entered federal politics in 1993 when he was elected as the Member of Parliament for the riding of Malpeque, P.E.I. He was re-elected in 1997, 2000, 2004, 2006, 2008, 2011, 2015, and 2019.

He served in Prime Minister Jean Chrétien's Cabinet as Solicitor General of Canada from 2002–2003. He also served as Parliamentary Secretary to the Minister of Fisheries and Oceans from 1997–1999, and to the Minister of Agriculture and Agri-Food, with a special emphasis on rural development from 2004–2006.

From 2006 to 2014, Easter has served several critic roles. He was the critic for Agriculture and Agri-Food and the Canadian Wheat Board from 2006–2011, International Trade from 2011–2013, and Liberal Party critic for Public Safety from 2013–2015.

Easter held the position of Co-Chair for the Canada- U.S. Inter-Parliamentary Association, and also held the position of Chair for the Government of Canada Legislators Finance Committee.

== Electoral record ==
2019 Canadian federal election: Malpeque
Party	Candidate	Votes	%	±%	Expenditures
Liberal	Wayne Easter	9,533	41.38	−20.70	$52,375.96
Green	Anna Keenan	6,103	26.49	+17.30	$24,970.77
Conservative	Stephen Stewart	5,908	25.64	+8.08	$47,940.85
New Democratic	Craig Nash	1,495	6.49	−4.68	$2,413.92
Total valid votes/expense limit		23,039	98.77		$87,624.55
Total rejected ballots		288	1.23	+0.78	
Turnout		23,327	76.29	−2.56	
Eligible voters		30,576			
Liberal hold		Swing		−19.00	
Source: Elections Canada

2015 Canadian federal election: Malpeque
Party	Candidate	Votes	%	±%	Expenditures
Liberal	Wayne Easter	13,950	62.08	+19.68	$84,420.76
Conservative	Stephen Stewart	3,947	17.56	–21.54	$40,127.00
New Democratic	Leah-Jane Hayward	2,509	11.17	–3.46	$6,264.15
Green	Lynne Lund	2,066	9.19	+5.32	$12,265.59
Total valid votes/expense limit		22,472	99.55		$170,512.40
Total rejected ballots		102	0.45	+0.01	
Turnout		22,574	79.05	+1.58	
Eligible voters		28,556			
Liberal hold		Swing		+20.61	
Source: Elections Canada

2011 Canadian federal election: Malpeque
Party	Candidate	Votes	%	±%	Expenditures
Liberal	Wayne Easter	8,605	42.40	-1.79	$47,363.15
Conservative	Tim Ogilvie	7,934	39.10	-0.18	$62.426.68
New Democratic	Rita Jackson	2,970	14.63	+4.96	$5,426.11
Green	Peter Bevan-Baker	785	3.87	-2.99	$1,367.33
Total valid votes/expense limit		20,294	100.0		$69,634.73
Total rejected, unmarked and declined ballots		90	0.44	-0.16	
Turnout		20,384	77.47	+6.06	
Eligible voters		26,311			
Liberal hold		Swing		-0.80	

2008 Canadian federal election: Malpeque
Party	Candidate	Votes	%	±%	Expenditures
Liberal	Wayne Easter	8,312	44.19	-6.29	$51,835.54
Conservative	Mary Crane	7,388	39.28	+4.65	$56,705.00
New Democratic	J'Nan Brown	1,819	9.67	-0.57	$5,225.01
Green	Peter Bevan-Baker	1,291	6.86	+2.21	$3,626.22
Total valid votes/expense limit		18,810	100.0		$67,177
Total rejected, unmarked and declined ballots		113	0.60	+0.01	
Turnout		18,923	71.41	-3.69	
Eligible voters		26,498			
Liberal hold		Swing		-5.47	

2006 Canadian federal election: Malpeque
Party	Candidate	Votes	%	±%	Expenditures
Liberal	Wayne Easter	9,779	50.48	-1.42	$51,121.23
Conservative	George Noble	6,708	34.63	+2.13	$52,989.45
New Democratic	George Marshall	1,983	10.24	+0.15	$3,388.31
Green	Sharon Labchuk	901	4.65	-0.85	$2,925.11
Total valid votes/expense limit		19,371	100.0		$62,210
Total rejected, unmarked and declined ballots		114	0.59	-0.17	
Turnout		19,485	75.10	+2.09	
Eligible voters		25,945			
Liberal hold		Swing		-1.78	

2004 Canadian federal election: Malpeque
Party	Candidate	Votes	%	±%	Expenditures
Liberal	Wayne Easter	9,782	51.90	+3.28	$49,256.92
Conservative	Mary Crane	6,126	32.50	-13.28	$52,127.38
New Democratic	Ken Bingham	1,902	10.09	+5.86	$3,055.96
Green	Sharon Labchuk	1,037	5.50	+4.15	$2,989.44
Total valid votes/expense limit		18,847	100.0		$60,645
Total rejected, unmarked and declined ballots		144	0.76		
Turnout		18,991	73.01		
Eligible voters		26,010			
Liberal hold		Swing		+8.28	
Change for the Conservatives is from the combined totals of the Progressive Conservatives and the Canadian Alliance.

2000 Canadian federal election: Malpeque
Party	Candidate	Votes	%	±%
Liberal	Wayne Easter	8,972	48.62	+3.53
Progressive Conservative	Jim Gorman	7,186	38.94	-2.05
Alliance	Chris Wall	1,263	6.84	+3.53
New Democratic	Ken Bingham	781	4.23	-6.39
Green	Jeremy Stiles	250	1.35	
Total valid votes		18,452	100.00	
Changes for the Canadian Alliance from 1997 are based on the results of its predecessor, the Reform Party.

1997 Canadian federal election: Malpeque
Party	Candidate	Votes	%	±%
Liberal	Wayne Easter	7,912	45.09	-16.03
Progressive Conservative	Jimmie Gorman	7,194	40.99	+9.80
New Democratic	Andrew Wells	1,863	10.62	+6.21
Reform	Stephen Livingstone	580	3.31	
Total valid votes		17,549	100.00	

Parliament of Canada
Preceded by Catherine Callbeck	Member of Parliament for Malpeque; 1993–2021	Succeeded by Heath MacDonald
26th Canadian Ministry (1993–2003) – Cabinet of Jean Chrétien
Cabinet post (1)
Predecessor	Office	Successor
Lawrence MacAulay	Solicitor General of Canada; 2002–2003	Anne McLellan
