= Bonshaw, Prince Edward Island =

Bonshaw
- Rural municipality
- Rural Municipality of Bonshaw
- Bonshaw in Prince Edward Island
- Coordinates: 46°11′22.5″N 63°20′37.3″W
- Country: Canada
- Province: Prince Edward Island
- County: Queens County
- Incorporated (community): 1977
- Incorporated (rural municipality): January 1, 2018
- Amalgamated: September 1, 2020

Population (2011)
  - Total: 218
- Time zone: AST
  - Summer (DST): ADT
- Area code: 902
- Telephone Exchange: 675

Bonshaw is a former rural municipality in the Canadian province of Prince Edward Island within Queens County.

== History ==
The Municipality of Bonshaw was originally incorporated in 1977. It incorporated as a rural municipality on January 1, 2018. The Strathgartney Homestead in Bonshaw, the remnants of a former estate, was designated a National Historic Site of Canada in 1996 in recognition of the absentee landowner problem that persisted in Prince Edward Island until the passage of the Land Purchase Act of 1875. The province designated a rock in Bonshaw with etchings from the 1880s as a heritage site on February 2, 2015.

On September 1, 2020, the Rural Municipality of Bonshaw amalgamated with the rural municipalities of Afton, Meadowbank, New Haven-Riverdale, and West River. The amalgamated municipality was named the Rural Municipality of West River.

== Geography ==
Bonshaw is located near the province's south shore on the Northumberland Strait. It is located in the valley of the Bonshaw River, also known as the Tjigaoegatig (Miꞌkmaq for 'bass place') River or West River and is surrounded by low rolling hills colloquially referred to as the Bonshaw Hills. The freshwater portion of the river at the tidehead offers trout fishing. Localities within Bonshaw include Bonshaw and Crosbys Mill.

== Attractions ==
Bonshaw has hiking and biking trails. Bonshaw Provincial Park is on the eastern edge of Bonshaw.
