= Afton, Prince Edward Island =

Afton
- Rural municipality
- Rural Municipality of Afton
- Afton in Prince Edward Island
- Coordinates: 46.159°N 63.208°W
- Country: Canada
- Province: Prince Edward Island
- County: Queens County
- Incorporated (community): 1974
- Incorporated (rural municipality): January 1, 2018
- Amalgamated: September 1, 2020

Population (2011)
  - Total: 1,222
- Time zone: AST
  - Summer (DST): ADT
- Area code: 902
- Telephone Exchange: 675

Afton is a former rural municipality in the Canadian province of Prince Edward Island within Queens County.

== History ==
The Municipality of Afton was originally incorporated in 1974. It incorporated as a rural municipality on January 1, 2018. On September 1, 2020, the Rural Municipality of Afton amalgamated with the rural municipalities of Bonshaw, Meadowbank, New Haven-Riverdale, and West River. The amalgamated municipality was named the Rural Municipality of West River.

== Geography ==
Localities within Afton include Cumberland, Fairview, New Dominion, Nine Mile Creek, Rice Point, and Rocky Point.
