= New Haven-Riverdale =

- Former rural municipality
- Rural Municipality of New Haven-Riverdale
- New Haven-Riverdale in Prince Edward Island
- Coordinates: 46.217°N 63.333°W
- Country: Canada
- Province: Prince Edward Island
- County: Queens County
- Incorporated (community): 1974
- Incorporated (rural municipality): January 1, 2018
- Amalgamated: September 1, 2020

Population (2011)
  - Total: 485
- Time zone: AST
  - Summer (DST): ADT
- Area code: 902
- Telephone Exchange: 675

New Haven-Riverdale is a former rural municipality in the Canadian province of Prince Edward Island within Queens County.

== History ==
The Municipality of New Haven-Riverdale was originally incorporated in 1974. It incorporated as a rural municipality on January 1, 2018. On September 1, 2020, the Rural Municipality of New Haven-Riverdale amalgamated with the rural municipalities of Afton, Bonshaw, Meadowbank, and West River. The amalgamated municipality was named the Rural Municipality of West River.

== Geography ==
Localities within Bonshaw include Churchill, New Haven, Riverdale, and Strathgartney.

== See also ==
- List of communities in Prince Edward Island
