= Tayte Willows =

Canadian politician

Tayte Willows MLA

Member of the Legislative Assembly of Prince Edward Island for Cornwall-Meadowbank
- Incumbent
- Assumed office July 13, 2026
- Preceded by: Mark McLane

Personal details
- Born: October 8, 1990
- Party: Green
- Education: University of Prince Edward Island

Tayte Willows is a Canadian politician who was elected to the Legislative Assembly of Prince Edward Island in the 2026 Cornwall-Meadowbank provincial by-election. She gained the seat for the Green Party of Prince Edward Island, defeating Liberal leader Robert Mitchell.

== Background ==
Willows resides in Cornwall, Prince Edward Island, with her husband and three daughters. She has worked as the Community Development Manager and Director of Programs and Policies with the Canadian Mental Health Association, and as the Principal Advisor of Mental Health and Addictions with the Department of Health and Wellness; before entering politics, she was the Manager of Chronic Disease Prevention and Management with Health PEI. She possesses a Bachelor of Science in Family Science, and a Master's degree in Applied Health Services Research, both from the University of Prince Edward Island. Willows has also served on the board of directors of the PEI Military Family Resource Centre.

== Electoral record ==
Prince Edward Island provincial by-election, July 13, 2026: Cornwall-Meadowbank Death of Mark McLane
| Party | Candidate | Votes | % | ±% |
|---|---|---|---|---|
| Green | Tayte Willows | 1,184 | 39.65 | +15.40 |
| Liberal | Robert Mitchell | 955 | 31.98 | +12.86 |
| Progressive Conservative | Caley McDonald | 823 | 27.56 | –27.19 |
| New Democratic | Craig Nash | 24 | 0.80 | –1.07 |
| Total valid votes | | 2,986 | 99.87 | |
| Total rejected ballots | | 4 | 0.13 | –0.37 |
| Turnout | | 2,990 | 60.87 | –7.62 |
| Eligible voters | | 4,912 | | |
| Green gain from Progressive Conservative | | Swing | | +21.30 |
Source: Elections PEI

2023 Prince Edward Island general election: Cornwall-Meadowbank
| Party | Candidate | Votes | % | ±% |
|---|---|---|---|---|
| Progressive Conservative | Mark McLane | 1,750 | 54.76 | +14.74 |
| Green | Tayte Willows | 775 | 24.25 | +0.86 |
| Liberal | Don Leary | 611 | 19.12 | -14.09 |
| New Democratic | Larry Hale | 60 | 1.88 | -1.50 |
| Total valid votes | | 3,196 | 99.50 | |
| Total rejected ballots | | 16 | 0.50 | |
| Turnout | | 3,212 | 68.49 | +13.10 |
| Eligible voters | | 4,690 | | |
| Progressive Conservative hold | | Swing | | +6.94 |
