= Stan Kutcher =

Canadian politician

The Honourable Stan Kutcher ONS
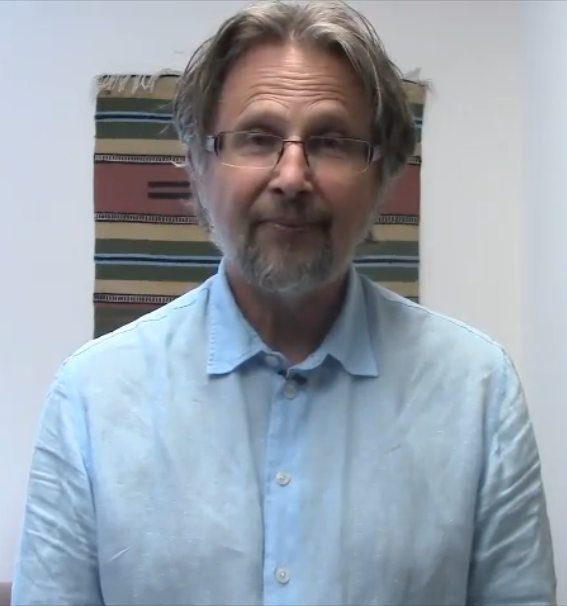

Canadian Senator from Nova Scotia
- In office December 12, 2018 – May 24, 2026
- Nominated by: Justin Trudeau
- Appointed by: Julie Payette

Personal details
- Born: Stanley Paul Kutcher; 16 December 1951 (age 74)
- Education: McMaster University (BA, MA, MD)
- Profession: Psychiatrist

Stanley Paul Kutcher ONS (born 1951) is a Canadian psychiatrist and Professor Emeritus of Psychiatry at Dalhousie University who served as a senator from Nova Scotia from 2018 to 2026.

Before his appointment, Dr. Kutcher was Department Head of Psychiatry at Dalhousie University, as well as Associate Dean of International Health, and where he held the Sun Life Financial Chair in Adolescent Mental Health. He is a fellow of the Canadian Academy of Health Sciences and a Distinguished Fellow of the Canadian Psychiatric Association. He was awarded the Order of Nova Scotia in 2014.

== Early life and education ==
Kutcher is a first generation Canadian born to Ukrainian refugees; his parents survived World War II and made a new life for themselves and their families in Canada. He credits his early life, particularly growing up in a household where community service to others was the norm, as full of the experiences that helped mould his values of civic engagement, that now inform his activities as a Senator. As a young person, he worked with youth living in financially challenged circumstances in Hamilton, Ontario and with incarcerated young people in Ontario's juvenile justice system and as a labourer-teacher with Frontier College.

Kutcher obtained his bachelor's degree in history and political science and his master's degree in history at McMaster University and his medical degree at McMaster University Medical School. His postgraduate training in psychiatry was at the University of Toronto and he completed a McLaughlin Fellowship at the Medical Research Council Brain Metabolism Unit in Edinburgh. He is internationally known for his clinical research, policy, and educational work in youth mental health.

He is married to Jan Sheppard Kutcher. They have three adult children and seven grandchildren.

He was a board member of the Art Gallery of Nova Scotia.

== Academic career ==
Kutcher has made contributions to Canadian and international research regarding the causes and treatment of mental illness in young people, particularly Bipolar Disorder and Major Depressive Disorder.

He developed youth mental health research, education, treatment and community intervention programs at Sunnybrook Health Sciences Centre in Toronto.

As a professor of psychiatry at Dalhousie University, he helped establish the Brain Repair Centre and the Life Sciences Development Association. He was Director of the World Health Organization Collaborating Centre in Mental Health Policy and Training and participated in numerous mental health initiatives led by the Pan American Health Organization, including mental health training, policy development and post-disaster mental health interventions. He co-chaired the Minister of Health's Advisory Panel on Innovation in Mental Health and Addictions in Nova Scotia.

Much of his work has focused on improving mental health care in primary care in Canada and around the world. His work in Canada and globally has included mental health interventions such as the online mental health knowledge translation resource for educators, primary health care providers, youth and parents – TeenMentalHealth.org, as well as the program An Integrated Approach to Addressing the Issue of Youth Depression which combines youth focused radio programs with teacher and student mental health literacy and clinical mental health care capacity building in Malawi and Tanzania. He led the development and deployment of novel mental health competency training programs in Canada, the Caribbean and Latin America. Some of his clinical tools, such as the Kutcher Adolescent Depression Scale have been validated and translated into numerous languages.

It was at Dalhousie University that he established the first International Health program in the Faculty of Medicine and the first Global Psychiatry training program in Canada.

Kutcher has created and led numerous school-based mental health literacy programs helping young people and educators better understand mental health and mental illness. For example, the Curriculum Guide Resource, designed for application in grades 7–10, is now researched and used across Canada and globally. The Transitions post-secondary schooling resource is used in Canada and being researched and applied in many other countries. He led the development of Teachmentalhealth, a pre-service/in-service teacher curriculum, in collaboration with the Faculties of Education at University of British Columbia, Western University and St. Francis Xavier University.

As a member of the Child and Youth Mental Health Committee of the Mental Health Commission of Canada, Kutcher led the development of a national child and adolescent mental health policy framework known as Evergreen. Kutcher's academic portfolio includes over 400 published papers and numerous books on topics ranging from psychopharmacology to suicide prevention, adolescent brain development and Global School Mental Health. He has taught and mentored hundreds of medical students as well as individuals pursuing Masters and PhD degrees, in and outside of Canada. He has served as a mental health advisor to organizations and governments in Canada and internationally.

He has led and collaborated in scientific research in Canada, the United States, United Kingdom, European Union, the Caribbean, Latin America, Africa and China. He has served as a founding board member of the Institute of Neuroscience, Mental Health and Addictions of the Canadian Institutes of Health Research, as well as on numerous other research boards and scientific advisory committees and consultancies in Canada and internationally.

He has been a visiting scholar at 14 institutions in eight countries.

=== Controversies ===
Kutcher was one of the authors of the controversial Study 329 clinical trial which took place between 1994 and 1998 studying the efficacy of paroxetine, an SSRI anti-depressant, in treating 12 to 18-year-olds diagnosed with major depressive disorder. Study 329 became controversial when it was discovered that the article had been ghostwritten by a PR firm hired by SmithKline Beecham, had made inappropriate claims about the drug's efficacy, and had downplayed safety concerns.

== Political career ==
During the 2011 Canadian federal election, Stan Kutcher was a candidate for the Liberal Party in the Halifax electoral district .

Stan Kutcher was appointed to the Senate of Canada on 12 December 2018. He resigned in May 2026, several months ahead of the mandatory retirement age of 75, due to health issues. His son, Dan Kutcher, is the leader of the PEI Liberal Party.

== Awards and distinctions ==
| Awards and Distinctions | Awarded By | Year Received |
|---|---|---|
| Order of Merit, 3rd Degree | President of Ukraine | 2025 |
| Discovery Award: Professional of Distinction Finalist | Discovery Centre Nova Scotia | 2019 |
| Distinguished Service Award | Doctors Nova Scotia | 2019 |
| Doctoris in Legibus Honorary Degree | St Francis Xavier University | 2019 |
| Naomi Rae-Grant Award for creative and innovative work in community intervention, consultation, and prevention. | Canadian Academy of Child and Adolescent Psychiatry | 2018 |
| Champion of Mental Health | Canadian Alliance on Mental Illness and Mental Health | 2018 |
| Award for Creative Professional Activity | Association of Chairs of Psychiatry of Canada | 2017 |
| Nova Scotia Champion of Public Education | The Learning Partnership | 2016 |
| Distinguished Alumni Award | McMaster University | 2015 |
| Order of Nova Scotia | Lieutenant Governor of Nova Scotia | 2014 |
| Excellence in Education Award | The Canadian Academy of Child and Adolescent Psychiatry | 2014 |
| John Ruedy Award for Innovation in Medical Education | The Association of Faculties of Medicine in Canada | 2013 |
| Paul Patterson Education Leadership Award | Canadian Psychiatric Association | 2012 |
| Robert Bortolussi Research Mentorship Award | IWK Health Sciences Centre | 2012 |
| Goodwill Ambassador | Counselling and Youth Development Centre for Africa | 2012 |
| Dr. John Savage Memorial Award | Faculty of Medicine, Dalhousie University | 2011 |
| Dr Michael Smith Award | Schizophrenia Society of Canada | 2011 |
| J.M. Cleghorn Research Award | Canadian Psychiatric Association | 2010 |
| Physician Health Promotion Award | Doctors Nova Scotia | 2008 |
| CCNP Gold Medal | Canadian College of Neuropsychopharmacology | 2008 |
| Paul D. Steinhauer Advocacy Award for his advocacy for young people at a national and international level | Canadian Academy of Child and Adolescent Psychiatry | 2008 |
| Lifetime Achievement Award | Canadian Psychiatric Research Foundation | 2005 |
| Honorary Lifetime Member | Turkish Association of Psychopharmacology | 2005 |
| Champion of Mental Health | Canadian Alliance on Mental Illness and Mental Health | 2004 |
| Jim Britten Sr. Recognition Award | The Schizophrenia Society of Nova Scotia | 2004 |
| Special Achievement in Development of Guidelines | American Academy of Child and Adolescent Psychiatry | 2004 |
| Recognition of Achievement | Canadian Academy of Child and Adolescent Psychiatry | 2003 |
| Special Achievement Award | Nova Scotia Hospital Foundation | 2003 |
| Award for Valuable, Unselfish and Constant Contribution to the Organization of Clinical Research in Cuba | Ministry of Public Health Cuba | 2003 |
| Charlotte and Norbert Rieger Award | American Academy of Child and Adolescent Psychiatry | 1991 |
| R.O. Jones Award | Canadian Psychiatric Association | 1990 |

== Electoral record ==
2011 Canadian federal election: Halifax
| Party | Candidate | Votes | % | ±% | Expenditures |
|---|---|---|---|---|---|
| New Democratic | Megan Leslie | 23,746 | 51.64 | +8.95 | $82,238.55 |
| Liberal | Stan Kutcher | 11,793 | 25.64 | -1.98 | $78,191.23 |
| Conservative | George Nikolaou | 8,276 | 18.00 | -2.61 | $48,637.42 |
| Green | Michael Dewar | 2,020 | 4.39 | -4.32 | $1,663.22 |
| Marxist–Leninist | Tony Seed | 152 | 0.33 | -0.03 | none listed |
| Total valid votes/expense limit | | 45,987 | 99.48 | | $84,606.68 |
| Total rejected, unmarked and declined ballots | | 241 | 0.52 | +0.01 | |
| Turnout | | 46,228 | 63.02 | +2.35 | |
| Eligible voters | | 73,357 | | | |
| New Democratic hold | | Swing | | +5.46 | |

== Selected books ==
- Child and Adolescent Psychopharmacology. W.B. Saunders. Philadelphia, USA. (1997)
- Practical Child and Adolescent Psychopharmacology. Cambridge University Press, Cambridge Uk. (2002)
- Suicide Risk Management: A Manual for Health Professionals. Second Edition. Wiley-Blackwell, UK. (2012)
- Adolescent Brain Development. Colloquium Series on the Developing Brain. (2014)
- School Mental Health: Global Challenges and Opportunities. Cambridge University Press, Cambridge, New York. (2015)
