= 2021 Cornwall-Meadowbank provincial by-election =

Provincial by-elections in Prince Edward Island

← 2019	November 15, 2021	Next →

District of Cornwall-Meadowbank
- Turnout: 55.25%
	First party	Second party	Third party
Candidate	Mark McLane	Jane MacIsaac	Todd MacLean
Party	Progressive Conservative	Liberal	Green
Popular vote	982	815	574
Percentage	40.02%	33.21%	23.39%
Swing	▲22.47%	▼14.69%	▼9.76%
- A map of Legislative Assembly districts in Prince Edward Island at the time of the by-election, with Cornwall-Meadowbank highlighted in red.
MLA before election
Heath MacDonald
Liberal
Elected MLA
Mark McLane
Progressive Conservative

The 2021 Cornwall-Meadowbank provincial by-election was held on November 15, 2021, to elect a Member of the Legislative Assembly of Prince Edward Island for the district of Cornwall-Meadowbank. The seat became vacant upon the resignation of Liberal MLA Heath MacDonald on August 18, 2021. MacDonald had held the seat since 2015 but resigned to run for Member of Parliament in the 2021 Canadian federal election in Malpeque, which he was successful.

Mark McLane of the governing Progressive Conservatives won the seat, defeating Liberal Jane MacIsaac. It was the first time the Tories won the area in 36 years. The Tories increased their seat total in the 27 seat legislature to 15.

== Candidates ==
Musician and activist Todd MacLean ran unopposed for the Green Party nomination, and was acclaimed on October 4.

The Progressive Conservatives nominated businessman Marc McLane at a meeting on October 18. Party president Charles Blue had indicated that several potential candidates were interested in the nomination, however McLane ran unopposed.

On October 20, both the Liberals and New Democrats announced candidates. Businesswoman Jane MacIsaac won the Liberal nomination from a field of four candidates, and biology professor Larry Hale was acclaimed for the New Democrats.

== Results ==
Prince Edward Island provincial by-election, November 15, 2021: Cornwall-Meadowbank Resignation of Heath MacDonald
Party	Candidate	Votes	%	±%	Expenditures
Progressive Conservative	Mark McLane	982	40.02	+22.47	$45,007.75
Liberal	Jane MacIsaac	815	33.21	-14.69	$12,077.11
Green	Todd MacLean	574	23.39	-9.76	$12,025.33
New Democratic	Larry Hale	83	3.38	+1.98	$1,873.22
Total valid votes/expense limit		2,454	100.00		$53,910.85
Turnout		2,454	55.38	−24.90	
Eligible voters		4,431			
Progressive Conservative gain from Liberal		Swing		+18.58	
