= Donald Wood =

Canadian politician

Donald Paul Wood

Member of Parliament for Malpeque
- In office 1977–1979
- Preceded by: Angus MacLean
- Succeeded by: Melbourne Gass

Personal details
- Born: March 22, 1933 Charlottetown, Prince Edward Island, Canada
- Died: July 7, 2015 (aged 82) Kensington, Prince Edward Island
- Party: Liberal
- Profession: businessman, farmer

Donald Paul Wood (March 22, 1933 – July 7, 2015) was a Canadian politician and a businessman and farmer. He was elected to the House of Commons of Canada as a Member of the Liberal Party in a 1977 by-election, after the resignation of Tory Angus MacLean on October 20, 1976. During this time, he was Parliamentary Secretary to the Minister of Regional Economic Expansion. He lost the 1979 election to Melbourne Gass. He lost the 1968 election to the Hon. Angus MacLean. He also sat as a member of various standing committees including Agriculture, Fisheries and Forestry and Public Accounts. Wood died on July 7, 2015.

== Electoral record ==
1979 Canadian federal election: Malpeque
Party	Candidate	Votes	%	±%
Progressive Conservative	Melbourne Gass	8,729	52.70	+5.63
Liberal	Donald Wood	6,707	40.50	-7.87
New Democratic	Charlie Sark	1,126	6.80	+2.72
Total valid votes		16,562	100.00	

Canadian federal by-election, 24 May 1977 On the resignation of Angus MacLean, 20 October 1976
Party	Candidate	Votes	%	±%
Liberal	Donald Wood	4,657	48.37	+3.80
Progressive Conservative	Ian MacQuarrie	4,532	47.07	-3.54
New Democratic	Charles H. Sark	393	4.08	-0.73
Independent	A. Neil Harpham	46	0.48	
Total valid votes		9,628	100.00	
