= Melbourne Gass =

Canadian businessman and politician (1938–2018)

Melbourne Alexander Gass (December 21, 1938 – December 11, 2018) was a Canadian businessman and politician who served for nine years as the Member of Parliament for Malpeque. He served for two years as the leader of the Progressive Conservative Party of Prince Edward Island from 1988 to 1990, before leaving public life.

Gass served as Parliamentary Secretary to the Minister of Fisheries and Oceans from 1984 to 1986.

== Electoral record ==
1984 Canadian federal election: Malpeque
Party	Candidate	Votes	%	±%
Progressive Conservative	Melbourne Gass	10,577	56.35	+6.21
Liberal	Paul H. Schurman	6,186	32.96	-9.71
New Democratic	Janet Norgrove	2,006	10.69	+3.50
Total valid votes		18,769	100.00	

1980 Canadian federal election: Malpeque
Party	Candidate	Votes	%	±%
Progressive Conservative	Melbourne Gass	8,486	50.14	-2.56
Liberal	David S. Peppin	7,221	42.67	+2.17
New Democratic	Vic Arsenault	1,216	7.19	+0.39
Total valid votes		16,923	100.00	
lop.parl.ca

1979 Canadian federal election: Malpeque
Party	Candidate	Votes	%	±%
Progressive Conservative	Melbourne Gass	8,729	52.70	+5.63
Liberal	Donald Wood	6,707	40.50	-7.87
New Democratic	Charlie Sark	1,126	6.80	+2.72
Total valid votes		16,562	100.00	

Preceded by Don Wood, Liberal	Member of Parliament for Malpeque; 1979–1988	Succeeded by Catherine Callbeck, Liberal
