= Kody Blois =

Canadian politician (born 1991)

The Honourable Kody Blois PC MP

Parliamentary Secretary to the Prime Minister
- Incumbent
- Assumed office 5 June 2025 Serving with Rachel Bendayan
- Prime Minister: Mark Carney

Minister of Agriculture and Agri-Food and Rural Economic Development
- In office 14 March 2025 – 13 May 2025
- Prime Minister: Mark Carney
- Preceded by: Lawrence MacAulay (Agriculture and Agri-Food); Gudie Hutchings (Rural Economic Development)
- Succeeded by: Heath MacDonald (Agriculture and Agri-Food); Buckley Belanger (Rural Economic Development)

Member of Parliament for Kings—Hants
- Incumbent
- Assumed office 21 October 2019
- Preceded by: Scott Brison

Personal details
- Born: 17 January 1991 (age 35) Belnan, Nova Scotia, Canada
- Party: Liberal Party of Canada
- Profession: Lawyer
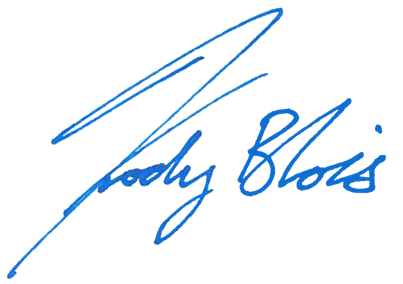
- Signature

Kody Blois MP (born 17 January 1991) is a Canadian politician who was elected to represent the riding of Kings—Hants in the House of Commons as a member of the Liberal Party in the 2019 Canadian federal election. After Mark Carney became Prime Minister, Blois became the Minister of Agriculture and Agri-Food and Rural Economic Development in March 2025, and was dropped from the ministry on 13 May 2025, due to the cabinet reshuffle. He was appointed as parliamentary secretary to the prime minister in June 2025.

== Early life and education ==
Blois was born on 17 January 1991, and grew up in Belnan, Nova Scotia, in Hants County. He played ice hockey and was a draft pick for the Halifax Mooseheads. He was involved in the establishment of the East Hants Sport Heritage Society in 2013, and founded the Tidefest music festival in 2016.

Blois was educated at Saint Mary's University in Halifax, graduating with an undergraduate degree in commerce. He went on to earn his Juris Doctor at Dalhousie University in 2018.

== Federal politics ==
Blois was elected to represent the riding of Kings—Hants in the House of Commons as a member of the Liberal Party in the 2019 Canadian federal election.

In May 2022, Blois was the only Liberal MP to support the opposition motion Bill C-234, which sought to amend the Greenhouse Gas Pollution Pricing Act by exempting natural gas and propane used by farmers to dry grain and heat barns from the federal carbon tax.

After Mark Carney became Prime Minister, Blois became the Minister of Agriculture and Agri-Food and Rural Economic Development in March 2025.

In the 2025 federal election, Blois employed "Farmers for Kody" campaign signs coloured burgundy, lacking any mention of the Liberal Party, to emphasize his personal brand and support amongst local farmers. The initiative was conceived a year prior amid declining support for the Liberals. The political science professor Erin Crandall of Acadia University noted that, despite the riding's 20-year Liberal hold, this was associated with support for Blois' predecessor Scott Brison rather than the Liberal Party as a whole. Crandall stated that Blois' use of personal branding provided him an advantage over the Conservative candidate.

Blois was reelected in the 2025 federal election on 28 April 2025, and dropped from the 30th Canadian Ministry on 13 May 2025 due to the cabinet reshuffle. He was appointed as the parliamentary secretary to the prime minister in June 2025.

In September 2025, Blois and the Premier of Saskatchewan Scott Moe travelled to China to discuss Chinese tariffs on Canadian canola. Over four days, Blois and Moe met with Chinese trade, foreign affairs, and customs officials; Blois called the meetings an "opportunity for re-engagement" and described the dialogue as positive.

At the time of the 2025 Canadian federal election, he lived in Lantz, Nova Scotia.

== Electoral record ==
2025 Canadian federal election: Kings—Hants
Party	Candidate	Votes	%	±%	Expenditures
Liberal	Kody Blois	35,836	60.56	+16.16	$126,680.47
Conservative	Joel Hirtle	19,773	33.41	+3.17	$78,772.70
New Democratic	Paul Doerr	2,154	3.64	-15.26	$9,273.85
Green	Karen Beazley	825	1.39	-0.54	$3,189.67
People's	Alexander Cargill	591	1.00	-3.53	$24.00
Total valid votes		59,179	99.35	–0.11	$128,510.56
Total rejected ballots		388	0.65	+0.11	
Turnout		59,567	73.02	+10.78	
Eligible voters		81,581			
Liberal notional hold		Swing		+6.50	
Source: Elections Canada
Note: number of eligible voters does not include voting day registrations.

2021 Canadian federal election: Kings—Hants
Party	Candidate	Votes	%	±%	Expenditures
Liberal	Kody Blois	20,192	44.92	+1.61	$80,518.90
Conservative	Mark Parent	13,234	29.44	+4.66	$54,740.13
New Democratic	Stephen Schneider	8,645	19.23	+2.05	$13,834.66
People's	Steven Ford	1,945	4.33	+2.69	$0.00
Green	Sheila G. Richardson	940	2.09	-10.46	$4,644.16
Total valid votes/expense limit		44,956	100.00	–	$107,126.60
Total rejected ballots		251			
Turnout		45,207	63.42	-5.34	
Registered voters		71,285			
Liberal hold		Swing		-1.53	
Source: Elections Canada

2019 Canadian federal election: Kings—Hants
Party	Candidate	Votes	%	±%	Expenditures
Liberal	Kody Blois	20,806	43.31	−27.43	$62,750.09
Conservative	Martha MacQuarrie	11,905	24.78	+6.20	$48,454.21
New Democratic	Stephen Schneider	8,254	17.18	+10.76	$28,020.03
Green	Brogan Anderson	6,029	12.55	+9.19	$12,592.53
People's	Matthew Southall	786	1.64	New	$3,504.18
Rhinoceros	Nicholas Tan	138	0.29	−0.11	none listed
Veterans Coalition	Stacey Dodge	118	0.25	New	$0.00
Total valid votes/expense limit		48,036	99.32		$101,328.14
Total rejected ballots		327	0.68	+0.25	
Turnout		48,363	68.76	−1.00	
Eligible voters		70,332			
Liberal hold		Swing		−16.81	
Source: Elections Canada
