= Dan Kutcher =

Canadian politician

Leader of the Prince Edward Island Liberal Party
- Incumbent
- Assumed office October 25, 2026
- Preceded by: Hal Perry (interim)

Mayor of Summerside
- In office November 7, 2022 – September 1, 2026
- Preceded by: Basil Stewart
- Succeeded by: Cory Snow (acting)

Personal details
- Party: Liberal
- Parent: Stan Kutcher (father)

Dan Kutcher is a Canadian politician who has served as the leader of the Prince Edward Island Liberal Party since 2026 and previously served as mayor of Summerside from 2022 to 2026.

He resides in Summerside with his wife, April, and their two children. Kutcher is originally from Ontario. His father, Stan Kutcher, is a former Nova Scotia senator.

Prior to elected office, Kutcher was a political staffer, entrepreneur, and lawyer. He worked in the federal and Ontario provincial government in various roles, and later served as president of the Greater Summerside Chamber of Commerce for two terms.

In November 2022, Kutcher successfully challenged longtime Summerside mayor Basil Stewart, defeating him with 61.55% of the vote.

In August 2026, Kutcher announced that he would not seek another term as mayor, instead entering the 2026 Prince Edward Island Liberal Party leadership election. In September, it was announced that he would be acclaimed party leader. He will be the Liberal candidate in Summerside-Wilmot in the next provincial election.
