= Minister of Rural Economic Development =

Canadian federal cabinet position

Secretary of State (Rural Development)
- Incumbent; Buckley Belanger since May 13, 2025
- Innovation, Science and Economic Development Canada
- Style: The Honourable
- Member of: Cabinet; Privy Council
- Appointer: Monarch (represented by the governor general); on the advice of the prime minister
- Term length: At His Majesty's pleasure
- Inaugural holder: Bernadette Jordan
- Formation: January 14, 2019
- Salary: CA$299,900 (2024)

The minister of Rural Economic Development (French: Ministre du Développement économique rural) was a Minister of the Crown in the Canadian Cabinet during the 29th Canadian Ministry led by Justin Trudeau. It was created in January 2019 and discontinued in March 2025, being merged with the Minister of Agriculture and Agri-Food to create a new post, the Minister of Agriculture and Agri-Food and Rural Economic Development. It was re-created in 2025 under the title of Secretary of State (Rural Development).

== List of ministers ==
Liberal Party of Canada

| No. | Portrait | Name | Term of office | | Political party | Ministry |
|---|---|---|---|---|---|---|
| 1 | | Bernadette Jordan | January 14, 2019 | November 20, 2019 | Liberal | 29 (J. Trudeau) |
| 2 | | Maryam Monsef | November 20, 2019 | October 26, 2021 | Liberal | 29 (J. Trudeau) |
| 3 | | Gudie Hutchings | October 26, 2021 | March 14, 2025 | Liberal | 29 (J. Trudeau) |
Position discontinued, replaced by the Minister of Agriculture and Agri-Food and Rural Economic Development until 2025
Secretary of State (Rural Development)
| 4 | | Buckley Belanger | May 13, 2025 | present | Liberal | 30 (Carney) |
