= Minister of Agriculture and Agri-Food =

Minister in the Cabinet of Canada

- Ministre de l'Agriculture et de l'Agroalimentaire
- Incumbent; Heath MacDonald since May 13, 2025
- Agriculture and Agri-Food Canada
- Style: The Honourable
- Member of: House of Commons; Privy Council; Cabinet
- Reports to: Parliament; Prime Minister
- Appointer: Monarch (represented by the governor general); on the advice of the prime minister
- Term length: At His Majesty's pleasure
- Precursor: Minister of Agriculture
- Inaugural holder: Ralph Goodale
- Formation: 12 January 1995
- Salary: CA$299,900 (2024)
- Website: agr.gc.ca

The minister of agriculture and agri-food (French: ministre de l'agriculture et de l'agroalimentaire) is a minister of the Crown in the Cabinet of Canada, who is responsible for overseeing several organizations including Agriculture and Agri-Food Canada, the Canadian Dairy Commission, Farm Credit Canada, the National Farm Products Council and the Canadian Grain Commission.

The post was established in 1995 as a successor to the minister of agriculture (French: ministre de l'agriculture), a position that existed since Canadian Confederation in 1867. The post was temporarily discontinued in 2025, being merged with the Minister of Rural Economic Development to create a new post, the Minister of Agriculture and Agri-Food and Rural Economic Development.

== List of ministers ==
Key:

Liberal Party of Canada
Historical conservative parties: Liberal-Conservative, Conservative (historical), Unionist, National Liberal and Conservative, Progressive Conservative
Conservative Party of Canada

Minister of Agriculture
No.	Portrait	Name	Term of office		Political party	Ministry
1		Jean-Charles Chapais	July 1, 1867	November 15, 1869	Conservative (historical)	1 (Macdonald)
2		Christopher Dunkin	November 16, 1869	October 24, 1871	Conservative (historical)	1 (Macdonald)
3		John Henry Pope (1st time)	October 25, 1871	November 5, 1873	Liberal-Conservative	1 (Macdonald)
4		Luc Letellier de St-Just	November 7, 1873	December 14, 1876	Liberal	2 (Mackenzie)
–		Isaac Burpee (Acting)	December 15, 1876	January 25, 1877	Liberal	2 (Mackenzie)
5		Charles Alphonse Pantaléon Pelletier	January 25, 1877	October 8, 1878	Liberal	2 (Mackenzie)
(3)		John Henry Pope (2nd time)	October 17, 1878	September 25, 1885	Liberal-Conservative	3 (Macdonald)
6		John Carling	September 25, 1885	June 6, 1891	Conservative (historical)	3 (Macdonald)
6		John Carling	June 16, 1891	November 24, 1892	Conservative (historical)	4 (Abbott)
7		Auguste-Réal Angers	December 7, 1892	December 12, 1894	Conservative (historical)	5 (Thompson)
7		Auguste-Réal Angers	December 21, 1894	July 12, 1895	Conservative (historical)	6 (Bowell)
8		Joseph-Aldric Ouimet (Acting)	July 13, 1895	December 20, 1895	Liberal-Conservative	6 (Bowell)
9		Walter Humphries Montague (1st time)	December 21, 1895	January 5, 1896	Conservative (historical)	6 (Bowell)
–		Donald Ferguson (Acting)	January 6, 1896	January 14, 1896	Conservative (historical)	6 (Bowell)
(9)		Walter Humphries Montague (2nd time)	January 15, 1896	April 27, 1896	Conservative (historical)	6 (Bowell)
(9)		Walter Humphries Montague (2nd time)	May 1, 1896	July 8, 1896	Conservative (historical)	7 (Tupper)
10		Sydney Arthur Fisher	July 13, 1896	October 6, 1911	Liberal	8 (Laurier)
11		Martin Burrell	October 16, 1911	October 12, 1917	Conservative (historical)	9 (Borden)
12		Thomas Crerar (1st time)	October 12, 1917	June 11, 1919	Unionist	10 (Borden)
–		James Alexander Calder (Acting)	June 18, 1919	August 11, 1919	Unionist	10 (Borden)
13		Simon Fraser Tolmie (1st time)	August 12, 1919	July 10, 1920	Conservative (historical)	10 (Borden)
13		Simon Fraser Tolmie (1st time)	July 10, 1920	December 29, 1921	Conservative (historical)	11 (Meighen)
14		William Richard Motherwell (1st time)	December 29, 1921	June 28, 1926	Liberal	12 (King)
–		Henry Herbert Stevens (Acting)	June 29, 1926	July 12, 1926	Conservative (historical)	13 (Meighen)
(13)		Simon Fraser Tolmie (2nd time)	July 13, 1926	September 25, 1926	Conservative (historical)	13 (Meighen)
(14)		William Richard Motherwell (2nd time)	September 25, 1926	August 7, 1930	Liberal	14 (King)
15		Robert Weir	August 8, 1930	October 23, 1935	Conservative (historical)	15 (Bennett)
–		Thomas Crerar (2nd time; Acting)	October 25, 1935	November 3, 1935	Liberal	16 (King)
16		James Garfield Gardiner	November 4, 1935	November 15, 1948	Liberal	16 (King)
16		James Garfield Gardiner	November 15, 1948	June 21, 1957	Liberal	17 (St. Laurent)
17		Douglas Harkness	June 21, 1957 (Acting until Aug.7)	October 10, 1960	Progressive Conservative	18 (Diefenbaker)
18		Alvin Hamilton	October 11, 1960	April 22, 1963	Progressive Conservative	18 (Diefenbaker)
19		Harry Hays	April 22, 1963	December 17, 1965	Liberal	19 (Pearson)
20		John James Greene	December 18, 1965	April 20, 1968	Liberal	19 (Pearson)
20		John James Greene	April 20, 1968	July 5, 1968	Liberal	20 (P. E. Trudeau)
21		Bud Olson	July 6, 1968	November 26, 1972	Liberal	20 (P. E. Trudeau)
22		Eugene Whelan (1st time)	November 27, 1972	June 3, 1979	Liberal	20 (P. E. Trudeau)
23		John Wise (1st time)	June 4, 1979	March 2, 1980	Progressive Conservative	21 (Clark)
(22)		Eugene Whelan (2nd time)	March 3, 1980	June 29, 1984	Liberal	22 (P. E. Trudeau)
24		Ralph Ferguson	June 30, 1984	September 16, 1984	Liberal	23 (Turner)
(23)		John Wise (2nd time)	September 17, 1984	September 14, 1988	Progressive Conservative	24 (Mulroney)
25		Don Mazankowski	September 15, 1988	April 20, 1991	Progressive Conservative	24 (Mulroney)
26		Bill McKnight	April 21, 1991	January 3, 1993	Progressive Conservative	24 (Mulroney)
27		Charles Mayer	January 4, 1993	June 24, 1993	Progressive Conservative	24 (Mulroney)
27		Charles Mayer	June 24, 1993	November 3, 1993	Progressive Conservative	25 (Campbell)
28		Ralph Goodale	November 4, 1993	January 11, 1995	Liberal	26 (Chrétien)
Minister of Agriculture and Agri-Food
28		Ralph Goodale	January 12, 1995	June 10, 1997	Liberal	26 (Chrétien)
29		Lyle Vanclief	June 11, 1997	December 11, 2003	Liberal	26 (Chrétien)
30		Bob Speller	December 12, 2003	July 19, 2004	Liberal	27 (Martin)
31		Andy Mitchell	July 20, 2004	February 5, 2006	Liberal	27 (Martin)
32		Chuck Strahl	February 6, 2006	August 14, 2007	Conservative	28 (Harper)
33		Gerry Ritz	August 14, 2007	November 4, 2015	Conservative	28 (Harper)
34		Lawrence MacAulay (1st time)	November 4, 2015	March 1, 2019	Liberal	29 (J. Trudeau)
35		Marie-Claude Bibeau	March 1, 2019	July 26, 2023	Liberal	29 (J. Trudeau)
(34)		Lawrence MacAulay (2nd time)	July 26, 2023	March 14, 2025	Liberal	29 (J. Trudeau)
Position discontinued, replaced by the Minister of Agriculture and Agri-Food and Rural Economic Development
Position re-established as Minister of Agriculture and Agri-Food
36		Heath MacDonald	May 13, 2025	present	Liberal	30 (Carney)

== See also ==
- Department of Agriculture and Agri-Food (Canada)
