= Meadowbank, Prince Edward Island =

Meadowbank Meadow Bank
- Former rural municipality
- Rural Municipality of Meadowbank
- Meadowbank in Prince Edward Island
- Coordinates: 46.200°N 63.232°W
- Country: Canada
- Province: Prince Edward Island
- County: Queens County
- Incorporated (community): December 31, 1974
- Incorporated (rural municipality): January 1, 2018
- Amalgamated: September 1, 2020

Population (2011)
  - Total: 338
- Time zone: AST
  - Summer (DST): ADT
- Area code: 902
- Telephone Exchange: 675

Meadowbank, previously Meadow Bank, is a former rural municipality in the Canadian province of Prince Edward Island within Queens County.

== History ==
The Municipality of Meadow Bank was originally incorporated on December 31, 1974. It incorporated as a rural municipality on January 1, 2018. On September 1, 2020, the Rural Municipality of Meadowbank amalgamated with the rural municipalities of Afton, Bonshaw, New Haven-Riverdale, and West River. The amalgamated municipality was named the Rural Municipality of West River.

Federal census population history of Meadowbank
Year	Pop.	±%
1981	202	—
1986	258	+27.7%
1991	306	+18.6%
1996	354	+15.7%
2001	367	+3.7%
2006	364	−0.8%
2011	338	−7.1%
2016	355	+5.0%
2021		—
Source: Statistics Canada

== Geography ==
The locality of Meadow Bank is within Meadowbank.

== See also ==
- List of communities in Prince Edward Island
