= Minister of Agriculture and Agri-Food and Rural Economic Development =

Minister in the Cabinet of Canada

- Ministre de l’Agriculture et de l’Agroalimentaire et du Développement économique rural
- Agriculture and Agri-Food Canada; Innovation, Science and Economic Development Canada
- Style: The Honourable
- Member of: House of Commons; Privy Council; Cabinet
- Reports to: Parliament; Prime Minister
- Appointer: Monarch (represented by the governor general); on the advice of the prime minister
- Term length: At His Majesty's pleasure
- Precursor: Minister of Agriculture and Agri-Food; Minister of Rural Economic Development
- Inaugural holder: Kody Blois
- Formation: 14 March 2025
- Website: agr.gc.ca

The minister of agriculture and agri-food and rural economic development (French: ministre de l’agriculture et de l’agroalimentaire et du développement économique rural) was a minister of the Crown in the Cabinet of Canada, who was responsible for overseeing several organizations including Agriculture and Agri-Food Canada, the Canadian Dairy Commission, Farm Credit Canada, the National Farm Products Council and the Canadian Grain Commission. The post was established at the start of the 30th Canadian Ministry on March 14, 2025, combining the two previous roles of Minister of Agriculture and Agri-Food and Minister of Rural Economic Development. The position was split into two, Secretary of State (Rural Development) and Minister of Agriculture and Agri-Food, on May 13, 2025.

== List of ministers ==
Key:

Liberal Party of Canada

No.	Portrait	Name	Term of office		Political party	Ministry
1		Kody Blois	March 14, 2025	May 13, 2025	Liberal	30 (Carney)
Position discontinued, replaced by the Minister of Agriculture and Agri-Food and Secretary of State (Rural Development) since 2025

== See also ==
- Agriculture and Agri-Food Canada
- Innovation, Science and Economic Development Canada
