= West River, Prince Edward Island =

West River
- Rural municipality
- Rural Municipality of West River
- West River in Prince Edward Island
- Coordinates: 46.167°N 63.300°W
- Country: Canada
- Province: Prince Edward Island
- County: Queens County
- Incorporated (community): 1974
- Incorporated (rural municipality): January 1, 2018
- Amalgamated: September 1, 2020

Population (2011)
  - Total: 741
- Time zone: AST
  - Summer (DST): ADT
- Area code: 902
- Telephone Exchange: 675

West River is a rural municipality in the Canadian province of Prince Edward Island within Queens County.

== History ==
The Municipality of West River was originally incorporated in 1974. It incorporated as a rural municipality on January 1, 2018. On September 1, 2020, the Rural Municipality of West River amalgamated with the rural municipalities of Afton, Bonshaw, Meadowbank, and New Haven-Riverdale. The amalgamated municipality was named the Rural Municipality of West River.

== Geography ==
Prior to the amalgamation, localities within West River included Canoe Cove, Long Creek, New Argyle, and St. Catherines.

== Demographics ==
Federal census population history of West River
Year	Pop.	±%
2016	3,110	—
2021	3,473	+11.7%
Source: Statistics Canada

In the 2021 Census of Population conducted by Statistics Canada, West River had a population of 3,473 living in 1,351 of its 1,774 total private dwellings, a change of 11.7% from its 2016 population of 3,110. With a land area of 121.62 km^{2} (46.96 sq mi), it had a population density of 28.6/km^{2} (74.0/sq mi) in 2021.

== See also ==
- List of communities in Prince Edward Island
