= Cornwall-Meadowbank =

Provincial electoral district in Prince Edward Island, Canada

Prince Edward Island electoral district
- Coordinates: 46.237°N 63.209°W

Provincial electoral district
- Legislature: Legislative Assembly of Prince Edward Island
MLA
Tayte Willows
Green
- District created: 1996
- First contested: 1996
- Last contested: 2026 (by-election)

Demographics
- Census division: Queens County
- Census subdivision(s): Cornwall, Clyde River, West River.

Cornwall-Meadowbank (District 16) is a provincial electoral district for the Legislative Assembly of Prince Edward Island, Canada. It was previously known as North River-Rice Point.

The riding consists of the Town of Cornwall, the Community of Meadowbank, and a small section of the Community of Clyde River.

== Members ==
The riding has elected the following members of the Legislative Assembly:

Members of the Legislative Assembly for Cornwall-Meadowbank
Assembly	Years	Member	Party
See 2nd Queens 1873–1996
60th	1996–2000	Ron MacKinley	Liberal
61st	2000–2003	Ron MacKinley	Liberal
62nd	2003–2007	Ron MacKinley	Liberal
63rd	2007–2011	Ron MacKinley	Liberal
64th	2011–2015	Ron MacKinley	Liberal
65th	2015–2019	Heath MacDonald	Liberal
66th	2019–2021	Heath MacDonald	Liberal
66th	2021–2023	Mark McLane	Progressive Conservative
67th	2023–2026	Mark McLane	Progressive Conservative
67th	2026–present	Tayte Willows	Green

== Election results ==
=== Cornwall-Meadowbank, 2007–present ===
Prince Edward Island provincial by-election, July 13, 2026 Death of Mark McLane
Party	Candidate	Votes	%	±%
Green	Tayte Willows	1,184	39.65	+15.40
Liberal	Robert Mitchell	955	31.98	+12.86
Progressive Conservative	Caley McDonald	823	27.56	–27.19
New Democratic	Craig Nash	24	0.80	–1.07
Total valid votes		2,986	99.87	
Total rejected ballots		4	0.13	–0.37
Turnout		2,990	60.87	–7.62
Eligible voters		4,912		
Green gain from Progressive Conservative		Swing		+21.30
Source: Elections PEI

2023 Prince Edward Island general election
Party	Candidate	Votes	%	±%
Progressive Conservative	Mark McLane	1,750	54.76	+14.74
Green	Tayte Willows	775	24.25	+0.86
Liberal	Don Leary	611	19.12	-14.09
New Democratic	Larry Hale	60	1.88	-1.50
Total valid votes		3,196	99.50	
Total rejected ballots		16	0.50	
Turnout		3,212	68.49	+13.10
Eligible voters		4,690		
Progressive Conservative hold		Swing		+6.94

Prince Edward Island provincial by-election, November 15, 2021 Resignation of Heath MacDonald
Party	Candidate	Votes	%	±%	Expenditures
Progressive Conservative	Mark McLane	982	40.02	+22.47	$45,007.75
Liberal	Jane MacIsaac	815	33.21	-14.69	$12,077.11
Green	Todd MacLean	574	23.39	-9.76	$12,025.33
New Democratic	Larry Hale	83	3.38	+1.98	$1,873.22
Total valid votes/expense limit		2,454	100.00		$53,910.85
Turnout		2,454	55.38	−24.90	
Eligible voters		4,431			
Progressive Conservative gain from Liberal		Swing		+18.58	

2019 Prince Edward Island general election
Party	Candidate	Votes	%	±%
Liberal	Heath MacDonald	1,643	47.90	+1.62
Green	Ellen Jones	1,137	33.15	+21.07
Progressive Conservative	Elaine Barnes	602	17.55	-16.30
New Democratic	Craig Nash	48	1.40	-6.39
Total valid votes		3,430	99.80	
Total rejected ballots		7	0.20	-0.12
Turnout		3,437	80.28	-1.25
Eligible voters		4,281		
Liberal hold		Swing		-9.72

2015 Prince Edward Island general election
Party	Candidate	Votes	%	±%
Liberal	Heath MacDonald	1,444	46.28	-17.17
Progressive Conservative	Michael Drake	1,056	33.85	+5.39
Green	Rosalyn Abbott	377	12.08	+5.61
New Democratic	Jennifer Coughlin	243	7.79	
Total valid votes		3,120	99.68	
Total rejected ballots		10	0.32	-0.46
Turnout		3,130	81.53	+10.50
Eligible voters		3,839		
Liberal hold		Swing		-11.28

2011 Prince Edward Island general election
Party	Candidate	Votes	%	±%
Liberal	Ron MacKinley	1,686	63.46	+1.14
Progressive Conservative	Larry Hogan	756	28.45	-3.68
Green	Allieanna Ballagh	172	6.47	+3.71
Island	Jay Gallant	43	1.62	
Total valid votes		2,657	99.22	
Total rejected ballots		21	0.78	+0.29
Turnout		2,678	71.03	-6.77
Eligible voters		3,770		
Liberal hold		Swing		+2.41

2007 Prince Edward Island general election
Party	Candidate	Votes	%	±%
Liberal	Ron MacKinley	1,761	62.31	-0.07
Progressive Conservative	Margaret Duffy	908	32.13	-2.80
New Democratic	Kirk Brown	79	2.80	+0.11
Green	Paul Ness	78	2.76	
Total valid votes		2,826	99.51	
Total rejected ballots		14	0.49	-0.00
Turnout		2,840	77.81	-4.78
Eligible voters		3,650		
Liberal hold		Swing		+1.36

==== 2016 electoral reform plebiscite results ====
2016 Prince Edward Island electoral reform referendum
Side	Votes	%
Mixed Member Proportional	524	31.08
First Past the Post	503	29.83
Dual Member Proportional Representation	322	19.10
Preferential Voting	181	10.74
First Past the Post plus leaders	156	9.25
Two-choice preferred result
Mixed Member Proportional	905	55.69
First Past the Post	720	44.31
Total votes cast	1,686	42.08
Registered voters	4,007	
Source "Plebiscite Report" (PDF).

=== North River-Rice Point, 1996–2007 ===
2003 Prince Edward Island general election
Party	Candidate	Votes	%	±%
Liberal	Ron MacKinley	2,506	62.38	+14.53
Progressive Conservative	Donna Butler	1,403	34.93	-8.82
New Democratic	Marlene Hunt	108	2.69	-5.71
Total valid votes		4,017	99.50	
Total rejected ballots		20	0.50	+0.23
Turnout		4,037	82.59	-0.72
Eligible voters		4,888		
Liberal hold		Swing		+11.68

2000 Prince Edward Island general election
Party	Candidate	Votes	%	±%
Liberal	Ron MacKinley	1,830	47.86	-3.83
Progressive Conservative	Donna Lank	1,673	43.75	+1.35
New Democratic	Irene Dawson	321	8.39	+2.48
Total valid votes		3,824	99.74	
Total rejected ballots		10	0.26	-0.11
Turnout		3,834	83.31	-2.47
Eligible voters		4,602		
Liberal hold		Swing		-2.59

1996 Prince Edward Island general election
Party	Candidate	Votes	%
Liberal	Ron MacKinley	1,958	51.69
Progressive Conservative	Brian Dollar	1,606	42.40
New Democratic	Marlene Hunt	224	5.91
Total valid votes		3,788	99.63
Total rejected ballots		14	0.37
Turnout		3,802	85.79
Eligible voters		4,432	
This riding was created from parts of the dual-member riding of 2nd Queens.

== See also ==
- List of Prince Edward Island provincial electoral districts
- Canadian provincial electoral districts
