= Mark McLane =

Canadian politician (1970–2026)

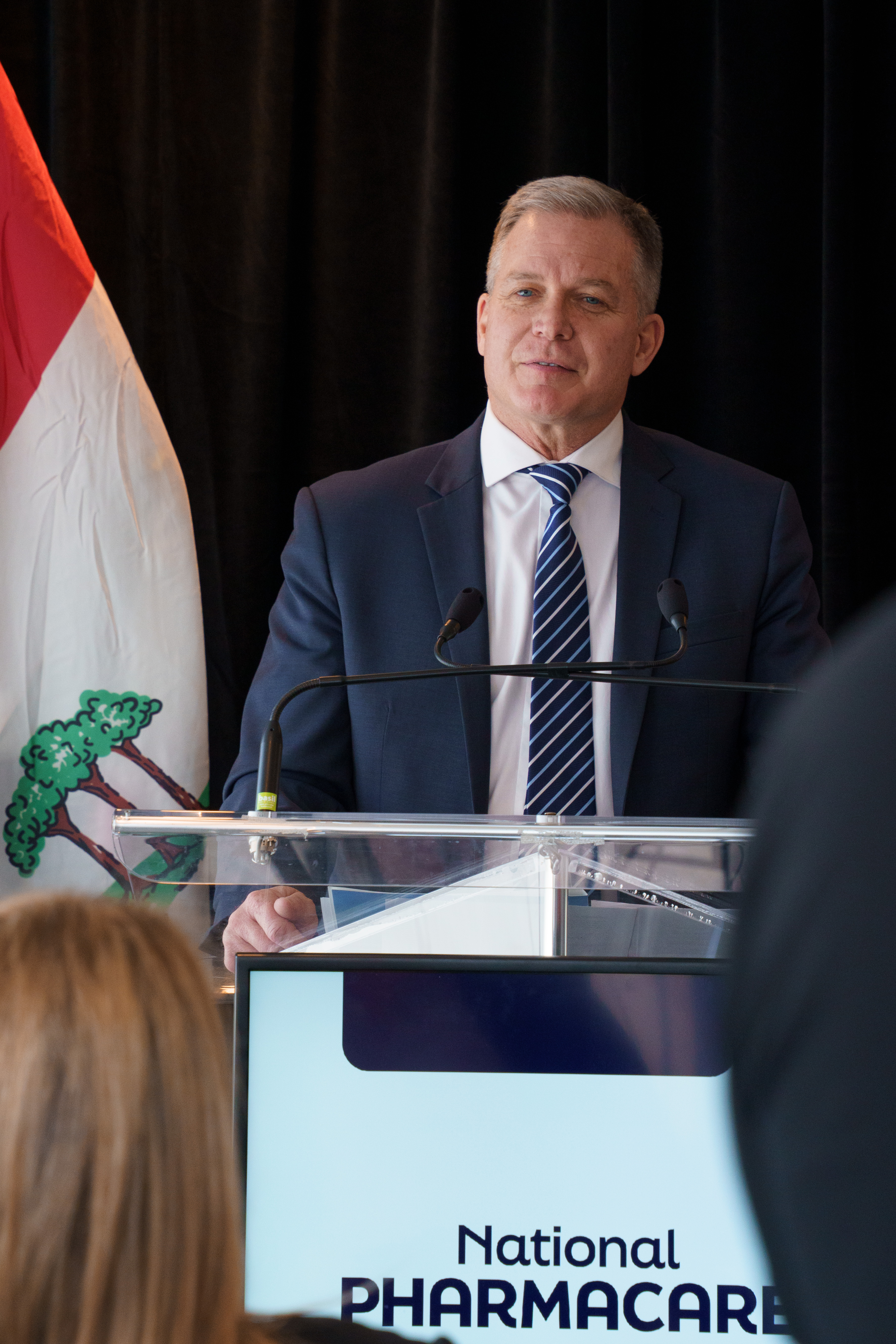

Member of the Legislative Assembly of Prince Edward Island for Cornwall-Meadowbank
- In office November 15, 2021 – March 17, 2026
- Preceded by: Heath MacDonald
- Succeeded by: Tayte Willows

Personal details
- Born: February 11, 1970
- Died: March 17, 2026 (aged 56) Cornwall, Prince Edward Island, Canada
- Party: Progressive Conservative
- Education: University of Prince Edward Island

Mark McLane (February 11, 1970 – March 17, 2026) was a Canadian politician, who was elected to the Legislative Assembly of Prince Edward Island in a by-election on November 15, 2021. He represented the electoral district of Cornwall-Meadowbank as a member of the Prince Edward Island Progressive Conservative Party.

He was re-elected in the 2023 general election. McLane served in the Executive Council of Prince Edward Island as Minister of Finance under premier Dennis King, and as Minister of Health and Wellness under premier Rob Lantz.

He took a leave of absence from the legislature in January 2026 due to health reasons. McLane died from an unspecified illness on March 17, 2026, at the age of 56.

== Electoral record ==
2023 Prince Edward Island general election: Cornwall-Meadowbank
| Party | Candidate | Votes | % | ±% |
|---|---|---|---|---|
| Progressive Conservative | Mark McLane | 1,750 | 54.76 | +14.74 |
| Green | Tayte Willows | 775 | 24.25 | +0.86 |
| Liberal | Don Leary | 611 | 19.12 | -14.09 |
| New Democratic | Larry Hale | 60 | 1.88 | -1.50 |
| Total valid votes | | 3,196 | 99.50 | |
| Total rejected ballots | | 16 | 0.50 | |
| Turnout | | 3,212 | 68.49 | +13.10 |
| Eligible voters | | 4,690 | | |
| Progressive Conservative hold | | Swing | | +6.94 |

Prince Edward Island provincial by-election, November 15, 2021: Cornwall-Meadowbank Resignation of Heath MacDonald
| Party | Candidate | Votes | % | ±% | Expenditures |
|---|---|---|---|---|---|
| Progressive Conservative | Mark McLane | 982 | 40.02 | +22.47 | $45,007.75 |
| Liberal | Jane MacIsaac | 815 | 33.21 | -14.69 | $12,077.11 |
| Green | Todd MacLean | 574 | 23.39 | -9.76 | $12,025.33 |
| New Democratic | Larry Hale | 83 | 3.38 | +1.98 | $1,873.22 |
| Total valid votes/expense limit | | 2,454 | 100.00 | | $53,910.85 |
| Turnout | | 2,454 | 55.38 | −24.90 | |
| Eligible voters | | 4,431 | | | |
| Progressive Conservative gain from Liberal | | Swing | | +18.58 | |
