= Heath MacDonald =

Canadian politician (born 1966)

The Honourable Heath MacDonald PC MP
- MacDonald in 2026

Minister of Agriculture and Agri-Food
- Incumbent
- Assumed office May 13, 2025
- Prime Minister: Mark Carney
- Preceded by: Kody Blois

Member of Parliament for Malpeque
- Incumbent
- Assumed office September 20, 2021
- Preceded by: Wayne Easter

Member of the Legislative Assembly of Prince Edward Island for Cornwall-Meadowbank
- In office May 4, 2015 – August 18, 2021
- Preceded by: Ron MacKinley
- Succeeded by: Mark McLane

Personal details
- Born: May 9, 1966 (age 60) Prince Edward Island, Canada
- Party: Liberal
- Other political affiliations: PEI Liberal

Heath MacDonald (born May 9, 1966) is a Canadian politician who has been Minister of Agriculture and Agri-Food since 2025. A member of the Liberal Party, MacDonald was elected to represent Malpeque in the House of Commons in the 2021 federal election.

== Background ==
A resident of Cornwall, Prince Edward Island (PEI), MacDonald has worked as a tourism operator and as executive director of Quality Tourism Services.

== Political career ==
He was elected to the Legislative Assembly of PEI in the 2015 provincial election, representing the electoral district of Cornwall-Meadowbank as a member of the Prince Edward Island Liberal Party until he resigned on August 18, 2021 in order to run in the 2021 Canadian federal election.

On May 20, 2015, MacDonald was appointed to the Executive Council of Prince Edward Island as Minister of Economic Development and Tourism. On January 10, 2018, MacDonald was named Minister of Finance in a cabinet shuffle.

On June 21, 2021, MacDonald announced he would seek the nomination to run for the federal Liberal Party in Malpeque. He won the nomination later that summer and was elected in the 2021 federal election.

On May 13, 2025, MacDonald was appointed as Minister of Agriculture and Agri-Food. MacDonald had previously served on the agriculture committee, finance committee, and chair of the public safety and national security committee prior to entering cabinet.

== Electoral record ==
2025 Canadian federal election: Malpeque
Party	Candidate	Votes	%	±%	Expenditures
Liberal	Heath MacDonald	15,485	57.60	+15.58	$84,828.51
Conservative	Jamie Fox	9,846	36.63	+3.50	$81,710.22
Green	Anna Keenan	1,049	3.90	−10.12	$23,174.45
New Democratic	Cassie Mackay	371	1.38	−6.65	$64.20
People's	Hilda Baughan	132	0.49	−2.30	$1,943.54
Total valid votes/expense limit		26,883	99.20	–0.11	$109,009.16
Total rejected ballots		216	0.80	+0.11	
Turnout		27,099	82.58		
Eligible voters		32,815			
Liberal notional hold		Swing		+6.04	
Source: Elections Canada
Note: number of eligible voters does not include voting day registrations.

2021 Canadian federal election: Malpeque
Party	Candidate	Votes	%	±%	Expenditures
Liberal	Heath MacDonald	9,912	41.81	+0.43	$84,041.53
Conservative	Jody Sanderson	7,836	33.05	+7.41	$84,415.05
Green	Anna Keenan	3,381	14.26	−12.23	$44,768.30
New Democratic	Michelle Neill	1,898	8.01	+1.52	$4,489.55
People's	Christopher Landry	680	2.87	–	$1,387.95
Total valid votes/expense limit		23,707	99.27		$90,924.86
Total rejected ballots		174	0.73	−0.51	
Turnout		23,881	74.61	−1.68	
Eligible voters		32,009			
Liberal hold		Swing		−3.49	
Source: Elections Canada

2019 Prince Edward Island general election: Cornwall-Meadowbank
Party	Candidate	Votes	%	±%
Liberal	Heath MacDonald	1,643	47.90	+1.62
Green	Ellen Jones	1,137	33.15	+21.07
Progressive Conservative	Elaine Barnes	602	17.55	-16.30
New Democratic	Craig Nash	48	1.40	-6.39
Total valid votes		3,430	99.80	
Total rejected ballots		7	0.20	-0.12
Turnout		3,437	80.28	-1.25
Eligible voters		4,281		
Liberal hold		Swing		-9.72

2015 Prince Edward Island general election: Cornwall-Meadowbank
Party	Candidate	Votes	%	±%
Liberal	Heath MacDonald	1,444	46.28	-17.17
Progressive Conservative	Michael Drake	1,056	33.85	+5.39
Green	Rosalyn Abbott	377	12.08	+5.61
New Democratic	Jennifer Coughlin	243	7.79	
Total valid votes		3,120	99.68	
Total rejected ballots		10	0.32	-0.46
Turnout		3,130	81.53	+10.50
Eligible voters		3,839		
Liberal hold		Swing		-11.28

Order of precedence
Preceded by Joël Lightbound as Member of the Cabinet	Order of Precedence of Canada as Member of the Cabinet	Succeeded by Jill McKnight as Member of the Cabinet
