= Malpeque (electoral district) =

Federal electoral district in Prince Edward Island, Canada

Prince Edward Island electoral district
- Interactive map of riding boundaries from the 2025 federal election
- Coordinates: 46.345°N 63.383°W

Federal electoral district
- Legislature: House of Commons
MP
Heath MacDonald
Liberal
- District created: 1966
- First contested: 1968
- Last contested: 2025
- District webpage: profile, map

Demographics
- Population (2021): 39,731
- Electors (2025): 32,680
- Area (km²): 1,663
- Pop. density (per km²): 23.9
- Census division(s): Prince, Queens
- Census subdivision(s): Cornwall, West River, North Shore, Kensington, Malpeque Bay, Miltonvale Park, Kingston, Borden-Carleton, North Rustico, Brackley

Malpeque is a federal electoral district in Prince Edward Island, Canada, that has been represented in the House of Commons of Canada since 1968. Its population in 2011 was 35,039.

== Demographics ==
According to the 2021 Canadian census, 2023 representation order

Languages: 93.7% English, 2.7% French
Race: 93.6% White, 1.6% Indigenous
Religions: 69.3% Christian (28.7% Catholic, 13.0% United Church, 5.3% Presbyterian, 4.9% Anglican, 3.7% Baptist, 13.8% other), 29.2% none
Median income: $41,200 (2020)
Average income: $47,840 (2020)

== Geography ==
The district includes the extreme eastern part of Prince County and most of Queens County except the extreme eastern portion and the City of Charlottetown. Communities include Cornwall, Kensington, Miltonvale Park, Borden-Carleton, North Rustico and Clyde River. The area is 1,663 km^{2}.

== History ==
The electoral district was created in 1966 from parts of Prince and Queen's ridings.

There were no boundary changes as a result of the 2012 federal electoral redistribution.

Following the 2022 Canadian federal electoral redistribution, the riding gained the remainder of North Shore and the North Shore Fire District, plus everything west of Highway 6 between them from Cardigan, and lost the Bedeque area plus some areas east and southeast of Summerside, and lost newly annexed territory by the City of Charlottetown in the Marshfield area to Charlottetown. These changes came into effect upon the calling of the 2025 Canadian federal election.

=== Members of parliament ===
This riding has elected the following members of parliament:

Parliament	Years	Member	Party
Malpeque; Riding created from Prince and Queen's
28th	1968–1972	Angus MacLean	Progressive Conservative
29th	1972–1974	Angus MacLean	Progressive Conservative
30th	1974–1976	Angus MacLean	Progressive Conservative
30th	1977–1979	Donald Wood	Liberal
31st	1979–1980	Melbourne Gass	Progressive Conservative
32nd	1980–1984	Melbourne Gass	Progressive Conservative
33rd	1984–1988	Melbourne Gass	Progressive Conservative
34th	1988–1993	Catherine Callbeck	Liberal
35th	1993–1997	Wayne Easter	Liberal
36th	1997–2000	Wayne Easter	Liberal
37th	2000–2004	Wayne Easter	Liberal
38th	2004–2006	Wayne Easter	Liberal
39th	2006–2008	Wayne Easter	Liberal
40th	2008–2011	Wayne Easter	Liberal
41st	2011–2015	Wayne Easter	Liberal
42nd	2015–2019	Wayne Easter	Liberal
43rd	2019–2021	Wayne Easter	Liberal
44th	2021–2025	Heath MacDonald	Liberal
45th	2025–present	Heath MacDonald	Liberal

== Election results ==
=== 2025 ===
2025 Canadian federal election
Party	Candidate	Votes	%	±%	Expenditures
Liberal	Heath MacDonald	15,485	57.60	+15.58	
Conservative	Jamie Fox	9,846	36.63	+3.50	
Green	Anna Keenan	1,049	3.90	−10.12	
New Democratic	Cassie Mackay	371	1.38	−6.65	
People's	Hilda Baughan	132	0.49	−2.30	
Total valid votes/expense limit		26,883	99.20		
Total rejected ballots		216	0.80		
Turnout		27,099	82.58		
Eligible voters		32,815			
Liberal notional hold		Swing		+6.04	
Source: Elections Canada
Note: number of eligible voters does not include voting day registrations.

=== 2021 ===
2021 federal election redistributed results
Party	Vote	%
Liberal	9,667	42.02
Conservative	7,622	33.13
Green	3,226	14.02
New Democratic	1,847	8.03
People's	642	2.79
Others	2	0.01

2021 Canadian federal election
Party	Candidate	Votes	%	±%	Expenditures
Liberal	Heath MacDonald	9,912	41.81	+0.43	$84,041.53
Conservative	Jody Sanderson	7,836	33.05	+7.41	$84,415.05
Green	Anna Keenan	3,381	14.26	−12.23	$44,768.30
New Democratic	Michelle Neill	1,898	8.01	+1.52	$4,489.55
People's	Christopher Landry	680	2.87	–	$1,387.95
Total valid votes/expense limit		23,707	99.27		$90,924.86
Total rejected ballots		174	0.73	−0.51	
Turnout		23,881	74.61	−1.68	
Eligible voters		32,009			
Liberal hold		Swing		−3.49	
Source: Elections Canada

=== 2019 ===
2019 Canadian federal election
Party	Candidate	Votes	%	±%	Expenditures
Liberal	Wayne Easter	9,533	41.38	−20.70	$52,375.96
Green	Anna Keenan	6,103	26.49	+17.30	$24,970.77
Conservative	Stephen Stewart	5,908	25.64	+8.08	$47,940.85
New Democratic	Craig Nash	1,495	6.49	−4.68	$2,413.92
Total valid votes/expense limit		23,039	98.77		$87,624.55
Total rejected ballots		288	1.23	+0.78	
Turnout		23,327	76.29	−2.56	
Eligible voters		30,576			
Liberal hold		Swing		−19.00	
Source: Elections Canada

=== 2015 ===
2015 Canadian federal election
Party	Candidate	Votes	%	±%	Expenditures
Liberal	Wayne Easter	13,950	62.08	+19.68	$84,420.76
Conservative	Stephen Stewart	3,947	17.56	–21.54	$40,127.00
New Democratic	Leah-Jane Hayward	2,509	11.17	–3.46	$6,264.15
Green	Lynne Lund	2,066	9.19	+5.32	$12,265.59
Total valid votes/expense limit		22,472	99.55		$170,512.40
Total rejected ballots		102	0.45	+0.01	
Turnout		22,574	79.05	+1.58	
Eligible voters		28,556			
Liberal hold		Swing		+20.61	
Source: Elections Canada

=== 2011 ===
2011 Canadian federal election
Party	Candidate	Votes	%	±%	Expenditures
Liberal	Wayne Easter	8,605	42.40	-1.79	$47,363.15
Conservative	Tim Ogilvie	7,934	39.10	-0.18	$62.426.68
New Democratic	Rita Jackson	2,970	14.63	+4.96	$5,426.11
Green	Peter Bevan-Baker	785	3.87	-2.99	$1,367.33
Total valid votes/expense limit		20,294	100.0		$69,634.73
Total rejected, unmarked and declined ballots		90	0.44	-0.16	
Turnout		20,384	77.47	+6.06	
Eligible voters		26,311			
Liberal hold		Swing		-0.80	

=== 2008 ===
2008 Canadian federal election
Party	Candidate	Votes	%	±%	Expenditures
Liberal	Wayne Easter	8,312	44.19	-6.29	$51,835.54
Conservative	Mary Crane	7,388	39.28	+4.65	$56,705.00
New Democratic	J'Nan Brown	1,819	9.67	-0.57	$5,225.01
Green	Peter Bevan-Baker	1,291	6.86	+2.21	$3,626.22
Total valid votes/expense limit		18,810	100.0		$67,177
Total rejected, unmarked and declined ballots		113	0.60	+0.01	
Turnout		18,923	71.41	-3.69	
Eligible voters		26,498			
Liberal hold		Swing		-5.47	

=== 2006 ===
2006 Canadian federal election
Party	Candidate	Votes	%	±%	Expenditures
Liberal	Wayne Easter	9,779	50.48	-1.42	$51,121.23
Conservative	George Noble	6,708	34.63	+2.13	$52,989.45
New Democratic	George Marshall	1,983	10.24	+0.15	$3,388.31
Green	Sharon Labchuk	901	4.65	-0.85	$2,925.11
Total valid votes/expense limit		19,371	100.0		$62,210
Total rejected, unmarked and declined ballots		114	0.59	-0.17	
Turnout		19,485	75.10	+2.09	
Eligible voters		25,945			
Liberal hold		Swing		-1.78	

=== 2004 ===
2004 Canadian federal election
Party	Candidate	Votes	%	±%	Expenditures
Liberal	Wayne Easter	9,782	51.90	+3.28	$49,256.92
Conservative	Mary Crane	6,126	32.50	-13.28	$52,127.38
New Democratic	Ken Bingham	1,902	10.09	+5.86	$3,055.96
Green	Sharon Labchuk	1,037	5.50	+4.15	$2,989.44
Total valid votes/expense limit		18,847	100.0		$60,645
Total rejected, unmarked and declined ballots		144	0.76		
Turnout		18,991	73.01		
Eligible voters		26,010			
Liberal hold		Swing		+8.28	
Change for the Conservatives is from the combined totals of the Progressive Conservatives and the Canadian Alliance.

=== 2000 ===
2000 Canadian federal election
Party	Candidate	Votes	%	±%
Liberal	Wayne Easter	8,972	48.62	+3.53
Progressive Conservative	Jim Gorman	7,186	38.94	-2.05
Alliance	Chris Wall	1,263	6.84	+3.53
New Democratic	Ken Bingham	781	4.23	-6.39
Green	Jeremy Stiles	250	1.35	
Total valid votes		18,452	100.00	
Changes for the Canadian Alliance from 1997 are based on the results of its predecessor, the Reform Party.

=== 1997 ===
1997 Canadian federal election
Party	Candidate	Votes	%	±%
Liberal	Wayne Easter	7,912	45.09	-16.03
Progressive Conservative	Jimmie Gorman	7,194	40.99	+9.80
New Democratic	Andrew Wells	1,863	10.62	+6.21
Reform	Stephen Livingstone	580	3.31	
Total valid votes		17,549	100.00	

=== 1993 ===
1993 Canadian federal election
Party	Candidate	Votes	%	±%
Liberal	Wayne Easter	10,579	61.12	+9.22
Progressive Conservative	Garth E. Staples	5,399	31.19	-8.98
New Democratic	Karen Fyfe	763	4.41	-3.52
Christian Heritage	John Freddie Gunn	318	1.84	
Green	Jeremy Stiles	249	1.44	
Total valid votes		17,308	100.00	

=== 1988 ===
1988 Canadian federal election
Party	Candidate	Votes	%	±%
Liberal	Catherine Callbeck	9,381	51.90	+18.94
Progressive Conservative	Gordon Lank	7,260	40.17	-16.18
New Democratic	Judy Whitaker	1,434	7.93	-2.76
Total valid votes		18,075	100.00	

=== 1984 ===
1984 Canadian federal election
Party	Candidate	Votes	%	±%
Progressive Conservative	Melbourne Gass	10,577	56.35	+6.21
Liberal	Paul H. Schurman	6,186	32.96	-9.71
New Democratic	Janet Norgrove	2,006	10.69	+3.50
Total valid votes		18,769	100.00	

=== 1980 ===
1980 Canadian federal election
Party	Candidate	Votes	%	±%
Progressive Conservative	Melbourne Gass	8,486	50.14	-2.56
Liberal	David S. Peppin	7,221	42.67	+2.17
New Democratic	Vic Arsenault	1,216	7.19	+0.39
Total valid votes		16,923	100.00	
lop.parl.ca

=== 1979 ===
1979 Canadian federal election
Party	Candidate	Votes	%	±%
Progressive Conservative	Melbourne Gass	8,729	52.70	+5.63
Liberal	Donald Wood	6,707	40.50	-7.87
New Democratic	Charlie Sark	1,126	6.80	+2.72
Total valid votes		16,562	100.00	

=== 1977 by-election ===
Canadian federal by-election, 24 May 1977 On the resignation of Angus MacLean, 20 October 1976
Party	Candidate	Votes	%	±%
Liberal	Donald Wood	4,657	48.37	+3.80
Progressive Conservative	Ian MacQuarrie	4,532	47.07	-3.54
New Democratic	Charles H. Sark	393	4.08	-0.73
Independent	A. Neil Harpham	46	0.48	
Total valid votes		9,628	100.00	

=== 1974 ===
1974 Canadian federal election
Party	Candidate	Votes	%	±%
Progressive Conservative	Angus MacLean	5,649	50.61	-2.92
Liberal	John W. MacNaught	4,975	44.57	+2.62
New Democratic	Doreen Sark	537	4.81	+0.29
Total valid votes		11,161	100.00	

=== 1972 ===
1972 Canadian federal election
Party	Candidate	Votes	%	±%
Progressive Conservative	Angus MacLean	5,835	53.53	+3.53
Liberal	Sinclair Cutcliffe	4,573	41.95	−5.97
New Democratic	Maurice J. Darte	493	4.52	+2.43
Total valid votes		10,901	100.00	

=== 1968 ===
1968 Canadian federal election
Party	Candidate	Votes	%
Progressive Conservative	Angus MacLean	5,049	50.00
Liberal	Don Wood	4,839	47.92
New Democratic	Douglas H. MacFarlane	211	2.09
Total valid votes		10,099	100.00

== Student vote results ==
=== 2011 ===
In 2011, a student vote was conducted at participating Canadian schools to parallel the 2011 Canadian federal election results. The vote was designed to educate students and simulate the electoral process for persons who have not yet reached the legal majority. Schools with a large student body that reside in another electoral district had the option to vote for candidates outside of the electoral district then where they were physically located.

2011 Canadian federal election
Party	Candidate	Votes	%
Liberal	Wayne Easter	318	34.79
New Democratic	Rita Jackson	255	27.90
Conservative	Tim Ogilvie	191	20.90
Green	Peter Bevan-Baker	180	19.69
Total valid votes		914	100.00

== See also ==
- List of Canadian electoral districts
- Past Canadian electoral districts
