= Rural municipality =

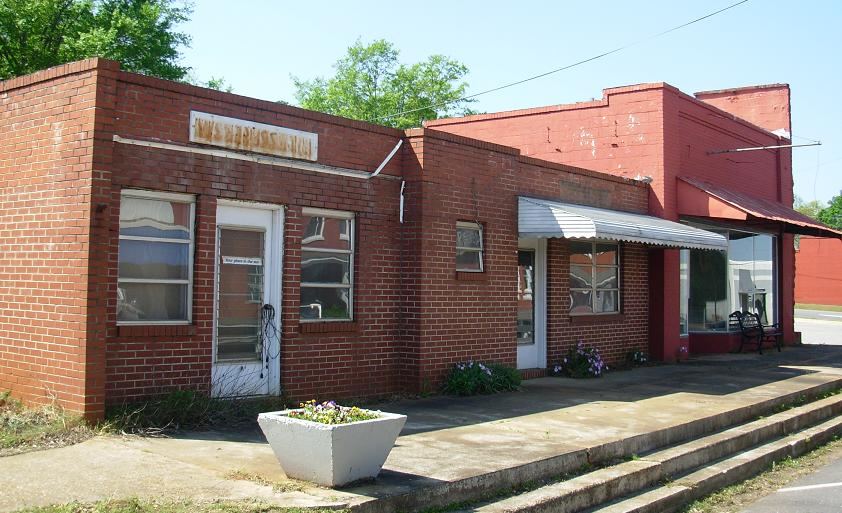
Rural municipality

A rural municipality is a classification of municipality, a type of local government, found in several countries.

These include:

- Rural municipalities in Canada, a type of municipal status in the Canadian provinces of Manitoba, Saskatchewan, and Prince Edward Island. In other provinces, such as Alberta and Nova Scotia, the term refers to municipal districts that are not explicitly urban, rather than being a distinct type of municipality.
- Rural municipalities in Estonia, also called parishes, of which there are 64 in the country. Municipalities may contain one or several settlements, and while all urban municipalities contain only one settlement, only 6 rural municipalities do. Of these, five are so-called "borough-parishes", consisting of one borough, while Ruhnu Parish consists of one village.
- Gaunpalika (Nepali: गाउँपालिका, romanized: gāunpālikā, "rural municipality") is a newly formed lower administrative division in Nepal. The Ministry of Federal Affairs and Local Development (Nepal) dissolved the existing village development committees and announced the establishment of this new local body. There are currently 460 rural municipalities in Nepal.
- Rural council or officially, village council (Ukrainian: сільська́ ра́́да, silska rada), often shortened to (Ukrainian: сільра́́да, silrada), a local government area as well as one of the lowest forms of administrative division of Ukraine that is associated with rural populated places in Ukraine. These populated places can refer to either villages (Ukrainian: село, selo) or [rural] settlements (Ukrainian: селище, selysche). The status of rural council was defined by a 1997 Verkhovna Rada law "On the Local Self-Government of Ukraine." In 2015, there was a total of 10,279 registered rural councils.
- Rural municipalities of Sweden between 1863 and 1971, see socken.
- Rural municipalities or communes in Albania (Albanian: komunë), a former type of municipal status in Albania prior to the 2015 reorganization of local government, which replaced them with administrative units and placed them under the supervision of the nearest urban municipalities

== See also ==
- Municipality, town, township, & village
- Urban municipalities of Albania
- Maalaiskunta
