= Almonte and District High School =

Location
- 126 Martin St. N. Almonte, Ontario; Canada; 45.23174°N 76.19644°W

Information
- School type: High school
- Founded: 1875
- School board: Upper Canada District School Board
- Principal: Mrs Swrjeski
- Grades: Grades 7-12
- Enrollment: ~350
- Language: English
- Colours: Orange and Black
- Mascot: OODA (Our Own Dumb Animal)
- Nickname: ThunderBolts
- Website: almonte.ucdsb.on.ca

Almonte and District High School (ADHS) is a public high school in the Upper Canada District School Board. It is located in Almonte, Ontario, which since 1998 has been a ward of the town of Mississippi Mills. Its catchment area includes Almonte itself and most of rural Mississippi Mills.

== History ==
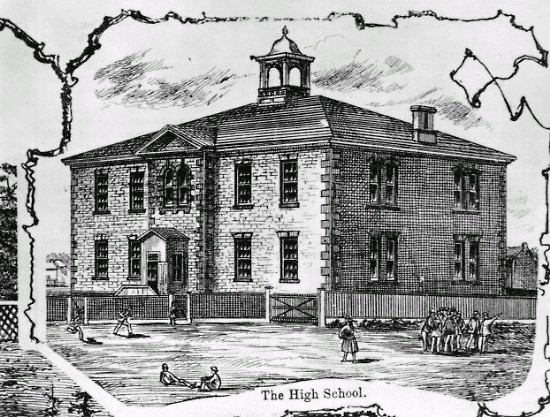
Almonte High School, 1879

A local historian states that ADHS opened in 1875, although a cornerstone on the building bears the date 1876.

An early ADHS student was James Naismith, the inventor of basketball. Naismith entered ADHS in 1875 but left in 1877 to work for several years. He returned in 1881 and graduated in 1883.

== Present day ==
The ADHS football team is called the Almonte Thunderbolts. In 2003 the Thunderbolts finished on top of the province-wide OFSAA league. They have won 27 regional championships since 1990.

The Almonte Thunderbolts also took home another OFSAA win with their junior football team during the 2015 football season.

The Almonte Thunderbolts won OFSAA basketball with their senior team during the 2018-19 season.

The SchoolBOX charitable organization was created by ADHS alumnus Tom Affleck. SchoolBOX builds schools for children in Central America, and many of its volunteers are ADHS students. Watch a CBC television report on SchoolBOX.

On March 20, 2013 Rick Mercer went to ADHS to film a clip for the Rick Mercer Report as a part of the Spread the Net campaign. The school raised a total of $5,854.05 for the campaign, which was the most among Canadian secondary schools. The clip aired on CBC television on April 2, 2013 at 8:00PM.

== Notable alumni ==
- James Naismith, inventor of basketball
- Perianne Jones, Olympic cross-country skier
- Oliver R. Avison, founder of the Severance Hospital in Seoul

== See also ==
- Education in Ontario
- List of secondary schools in Ontario
