= G(irls)20 =

Charity organization for women's business and politics

- Company type: Non-governmental organisation
- Founded: 2009
- Founder: Farah Mohamed
- Website: https://girls20.org/

G(irls)20, also known as Girls20, is a charitable organisation focused on advancing women's roles in politics and business. G(irls)20 holds an annual summit before the G20 Summit for a week of leadership training, networking, and advocacy. G(irls)20 was founded in 2009 by Farah Mohamed, a Canadian women's rights activist, at the Clinton Global Initiative.

Heather Barnaby is the current CEO.

== G(irls)20 Global Summit ==
The G(irls)20 Global Summit is held each year ahead of the G20 Summit. The first G(irls)20 Summit was held in Toronto in 2010. Other places the summits have been held include Japan, Argentina, Germany, China, Turkey, Australia, Russia, Mexico, and France. The 2020 summit was held online because of the COVID-19 pandemic.

== Girls on Boards ==
In 2017, G(irls)20 created Girls on Boards, an initiative to place women throughout Canada on boards of non-profit organisations. Each member of the program is given a board seat for one year, and partnered by another board member and a volunteer coach. Before being placed on a board, members are given leadership and business training.

== See also ==
- MediaSmarts
- Youth Employment Services
