= List of programs broadcast by DejaView =

This is a list of television programs broadcast by the Canadian television channel DejaView.

== Current programming ==
This is a list of programs currently being broadcast.

=== A-E ===
- Cheers (2004; 2010–2013; 2022–present)
- Dave's World (2025-present)
- Due South (2020–present)

=== F-M ===
- Face to Face with David (2021-2024, 2025-present)
- Haven (2014–20, 2024–present)
- Life in Pieces (2025-present)
- Man With a Plan (2018–2020, 2025-present)
- Melissa & Joey (2025-present)
- Mork & Mindy (2024–present)

=== N-W ===
- Private Eyes (2024–present)
- Saving Hope (2024–present)
- Spin City (2022–23, 2025-present)
- Wings (2025-present)

== Past ==
=== A-E ===
- 8 Simple Rules (2023-2024)
- The A-Team (2002–2006)
- Adam-12 (2002–2004)
- Adventures in Rainbow Country (2003-2004)
- All in the Family (2006–2018)
- America's Funniest Home Videos (2018(?)-21)
- Andromeda (2023–2025)
- Archie Bunker's Place (2010–2012)
- Barney Miller (2002–2004)
- The Beverly Hillbillies (2004–2007)
- Boy Meets World (2018)
- Bewitched (2002–2004)
- Black-ish (2024)
- Blossom (2018–2020)
- Bomb Girls (2014)
- Caroline in the City (2024–2025)
- Charles in Charge (2008)
- Coach (2009, 2010)
- The Cosby Show (2007)
- Danger Bay (2004)
- Dear John (2024–2025)
- Degrassi: The Next Generation (2020–21)
- Designing Women (2010)
- The Dick Van Dyke Show (2004–2007)
- Dragnet (2002–2004)
- The Drew Carey Show (2010–2014)
- Dancing with the Stars (2019–2021)
- Everybody Loves Raymond (2018(?)-22, 2023–2025)

=== F-J ===
- The Facts of Life (2007–2010)
- Family Feud (2008–2021)
- Family Game Night (2016–2020)
- Family Ties (2022–2024)
- Fanatical
- Frasier (2018–2024)
- Gilligan's Island (2002–2007)
- Good Times (2007)
- Green Acres (2005–2008)
- Happy Days (2002–2007)
- Hawaii Five-O (2010)
- Hee Haw (2004–2006)
- Hogan's Heroes (2002–2007)
- I Dream of Jeannie (2002–2004)
- The Incredible Hulk (2004)
- It Seems Like Yesterday (2003–2004)
- The Joke's on Us (2002–2004)
- JAG (TV series) (2012)

=== K-O ===
- Kate & Allie (2008–2011)
- The King of Queens (2018(?)-21, 2024)
- Knight Rider (2004)
- Laverne and Shirley (2003–2006)
- Lost Girl (2019)
- Mad About You (2009)
- Magnum, P.I. (2007–2009)
- Major Dad (2012–2016)
- Married... with Children (2013–2014)
- M*A*S*H (2006–2007)
- Maude (2007–2010)
- McHale's Navy (2002)
- Meet the Collectors (2005–2010)
- Miami Vice (2003–2005)
- My Secret Identity (ended in 2008)
- Neon Rider (2008)
- Night Heat (2007)
- North of 60 (2009)
- The Odd Couple (2015) (2016–2019, 2023)
- One Day at a Time (2009)

=== P-T ===
- Petticoat Junction (2002–2005)
- Ransom (2020-2024)
- The Rifleman (2009)
- The Rockford Files (2002–2007; 2009)
- The Ropers (2007; 2009–2010)
- Reba (2018)
- Remedy (2018–2020)
- Rookie Blue (2014–20, 2024–2025)
- Roseanne (2008–2016)
- Rules of Engagement (2018-2020 2023-2024)
- The Saint (2002–2003)
- Saved By the Bell (2009–2012)
- Seeing Things (2007)
- Seinfeld (2010)
- Silver Spoons (2009-2012)
- Simon & Simon (2004)
- Sketches of Our Town (2004)
- Square Pegs (2007–2008)
- Suburgatory
- Super Dave Osborne Show (2002–2004)
- T. and T. (2002–2004)
- Taxi (2002–2003, 2024–2025)
- The Golden Girls (2009, 2010, 2017)
- The Office (2007–2019)
- Three's a Crowd (2007, 2008, 2010)
- Three's Company (2009–18, 2020–23)
- TV with TV's Jonathan Torrens (2014–2015)

=== U-Z ===
- Welcome Back, Kotter (2003)
- Who's the Boss? (2007–2010)
- Will & Grace (2024–2025)
- The Wonder Years (2007–2009)
- Zoe Busiek: Wild Card (2020-23(?))
