= Rick Mercer =

Canadian comedian (born 1969)

Rick Mercer OC ONL
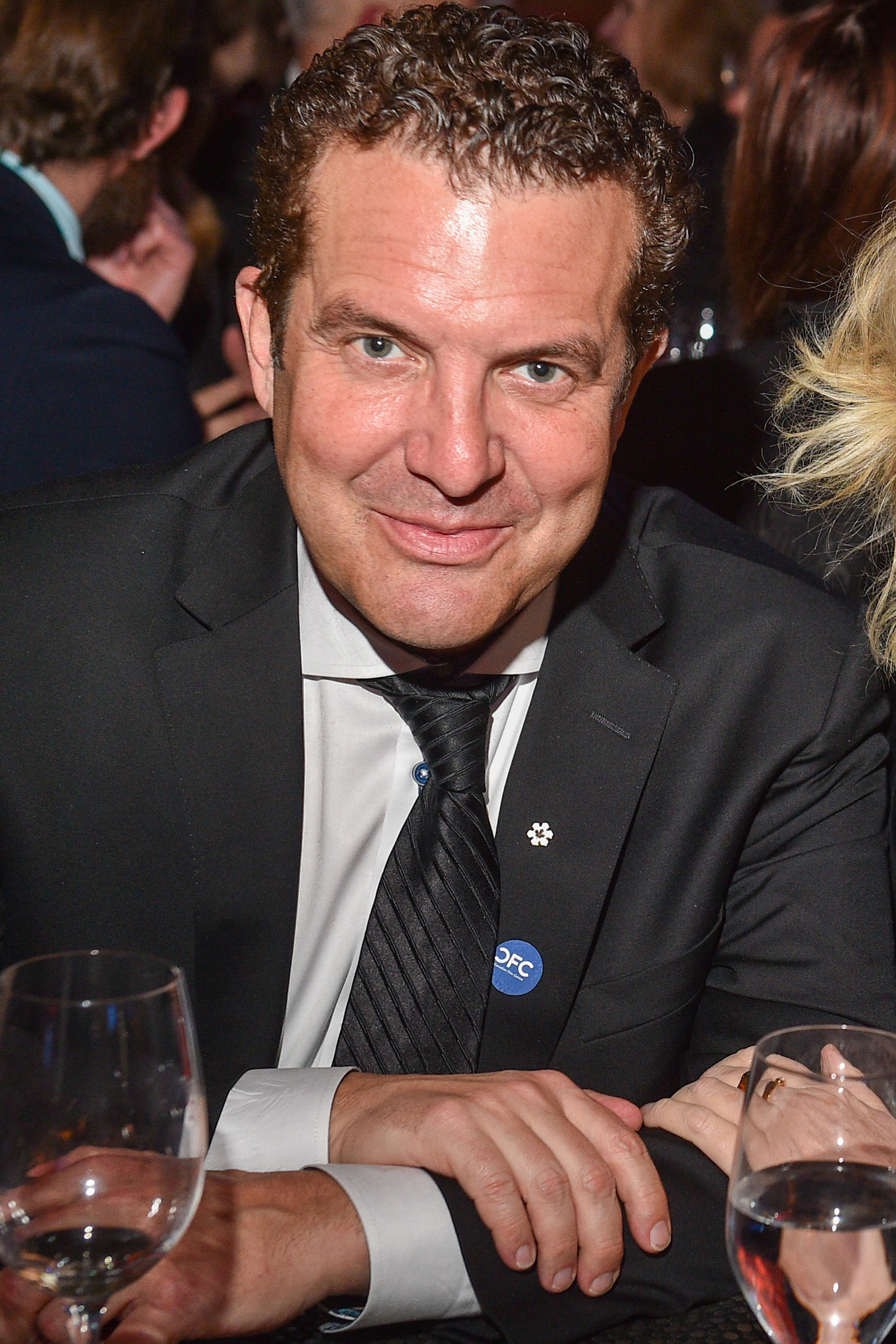
- Mercer in February 2020
- Born: Richard Vincent Mercer; October 17, 1969 (age 56); St. John's, Newfoundland, Canada
- Spouse: Gerald Lunz
- Website: www.rickmercer.com

Richard Vincent Mercer OC ONL (born October 17, 1969) is a Canadian comedian, television personality, political satirist, and author. He is best known for his work on the CBC Television comedy shows This Hour Has 22 Minutes and Rick Mercer Report. He is the author of four books based on content from the shows and the two part memoir consisting of Talking to Canadians (November 2021) and The Road Years (October 2023). Mercer has received more than 25 Gemini Awards for his work on television.

== Career ==
=== Early work ===
Mercer first came to national attention in 1990 when he created and presented his one-man stage show Show Me the Button: I'll Push It (or Charles Lynch Must Die) at the National Arts Centre's Atelier in Ottawa. A satirical political commentary on Canadian life after Meech Lake, Show Me the Button made Mercer a national star as he toured the show across Canada. In 1992, he created and performed his second stage show, I've Killed Before, I'll Kill Again at the National Arts Centre's Studio Theatre, which also became a popular touring show.

=== This Hour Has 22 Minutes ===
In 1992, he began to work with former CODCO members Cathy Jones and Mary Walsh, and fellow Newfoundlander Greg Thomey, to create a new television series for CBC Television which became This Hour Has 22 Minutes. In the first eight seasons of 22 Minutes, Mercer provided some of the show's signature moments, including an Internet petition (on the 22 Minutes website) to force Canadian Alliance leader Stockwell Day to change his first name to Doris. The website used for the petition was later repurposed as a way to have Canadians send Christmas cards to peacekeepers in Bosnia. Mercer hand delivered these to the troops in a December 2000 special. In 2001, following an incident in which an aide to federal member of Parliament (MP) Rahim Jaffer posed as the politician in a radio interview, Mercer performed a parody rap based on Eminem's "The Real Slim Shady", with the lyrics "Will the real Rahim Jaffer please stand up?".

Mercer's two-minute "rants", in which he would speak directly to the camera about a current political issue, shot in a style similar to those Denis Leary used in MTV commercials, quickly became the show's signature segment. In 1998, he published a book, Streeters, which compiled many of his most famous 22 Minutes rants. It became a national bestseller. In 2007 he published his second book, Rick Mercer Report: The Book.

In November 2010, Mercer contributed a rant he had previously recorded in 2007 on the subject of the bullying of gay and lesbian teens in high schools to Dan Savage's It Gets Better Project.

==== Talking to Americans ====
One of Mercer's comedy routines on 22 Minutes was Talking to Americans, in which he would travel to a major American city or institution and conduct on-the-street interviews with Americans on topics such as Canadian politics and weather, using the subject's ignorance about Canada for comedic effect. One famous example saw Mercer asking Americans' opinion on whether Canada should change its "20 Hour Clock" to the 24-hour one used by the United States. He received approval from citizens and from the Governor of Iowa, Tom Vilsack. On another occasion he got the support of Arkansas Governor Mike Huckabee in calling on Canadians to save the "National Igloo".

Mercer made international headlines in 2000 when he pulled a Talking to Americans stunt on then-presidential candidate George W. Bush. He successfully got Bush to answer questions about non-existent Canadian Prime Minister "Jean Poutine". Bush was not amused at the time, but he did make a joking reference to this incident during his visit to Canada in 2004. In the same US election campaign, Mercer asked Democratic candidate Al Gore to promise to visit the "Canadian capital city" of Toronto after his election. Gore did not question Mercer's incorrect identification of the capital of Canada.

In 2001, Mercer co-produced a CBC special based on Talking to Americans, which attracted 2.7 million Canadian viewers—the highest-rated television special in Canadian history. Later, the respected ABC News program Nightline would devote a show to it. This was his last major project related to 22 Minutes—at the end of the 2000–2001 season, he announced his departure from that show to focus on his other television show, Made in Canada. Talking to Americans was nominated for a Gemini Award, but following the 9/11 attacks, Mercer declined the nomination.

=== Made in Canada ===
Mercer co-created the series Made in Canada, which ran for five seasons on CBC Television from 1998 to 2003. The show was a fast-paced situation comedy which self-referentially satirized the Canadian TV production industry, often drawing from details of its own production companies and including thinly veiled parodies of contemporary programs. It was syndicated abroad as The Industry and won several Gemini Awards (which were themselves satirized in subsequent episodes).

=== The Rick Mercer Report ===
In 2003, Made in Canada ended its run, and Mercer began to work on a new CBC series, Rick Mercer's Monday Report. Similar in format to 22 Minutes and The Daily Show with Jon Stewart, the show debuted in January 2004. Also in 2003, Mercer went to Afghanistan to visit the Canadian troops stationed there, resulting in the television special Christmas in Kabul.

Despite reports of a long-standing feud, Mercer invited Mary Walsh to appear on Monday Report as a special guest to promote her own series Hatching, Matching and Dispatching.

At the end of its second season, Monday Report was the highest rated arts and entertainment show on the CBC. Former Prime Minister Paul Martin gave him a private tour of 24 Sussex Drive and former New Democratic Party leader Ed Broadbent made snow angels with Mercer on Parliament Hill. Other prominent guests were NDP leader Jack Layton (who was Mercer's own MP); Conservative Party leader Stephen Harper (former Prime Minister); Green Party leader Elizabeth May; then-Conservative MP Belinda Stronach; Conservative MP Peter MacKay; former Newfoundland and Labrador Premier Danny Williams; Olympic gold medallist Kyle Shewfelt; author Pierre Berton; recording artists Jann Arden, Bif Naked, Rush, bassist Geddy Lee, drummer and lyricist Neil Peart, and Sarah McLachlan; publishing mogul Conrad Black; and former prime minister Jean Chrétien. When Mercer hosted a relief benefit concert for the victims of the 2004 Indian Ocean tsunami at the Pengrowth Saddledome in Calgary, musical guests Barenaked Ladies appeared in a segment Mercer shot backstage completely naked.

In 2005, the CBC moved Monday Report to Tuesday nights, which caused the show's name to be changed to The Rick Mercer Report. On his blog, Mercer wrote of the time slot shift that "we ended the season as the highest rated comedy show on the network. Clearly some drastic changes were needed."

In 2017, it was announced that the Rick Mercer Report would end production after its 15th season; the last episode aired on April 10, 2018.

=== Other film and television work ===
Mercer has hosted It Seems Like Yesterday, which examines pop-culture from the 1950s to the 1980s. He has appeared in a few films, including Secret Nation, Understanding Bliss, How to Be Deadly and Bon Cop, Bad Cop.

In late 2014, he guest starred in the second to last episode of the Republic of Doyle television series.

In 2022, he launched Comedy Night with Rick Mercer, a CBC Television series showcasing stand-up comedy performances by emerging Canadian comedians.

== Books ==
A book by Mercer, Rick Mercer Report: The Book, based on his television program, was published on September 25, 2007, by Doubleday Canada. This was Mercer's first book since Streeters of 1998, and contained a collection of Mercer's rants from the first four seasons of Rick Mercer Report, together with moments from interviews for the program and other writings by Mercer. On CBC Radio's Sounds Like Canada on September 21, Shelagh Rogers said of the book that "it's the most fun I've had in bed in a long time." The book entered the Globe and Mail books chart on October 6 at number three. It was number one in the Globe bestseller list in the week before Christmas 2007, and reprinted eight times.

An expanded and updated paperback version of Rick Mercer Report: The Book, called Rick Mercer Report: The Paperback Book, was published by Anchor Canada on September 16, 2008, and immediately entered the top ten of the Globe and Mail bestseller list. It has been reprinted several times.

Mercer's next book, A Nation Worth Ranting About, was published by Doubleday Canada on September 18, 2012. It was also a bestseller.

Rick Mercer Final Report was published by Doubleday Canada in 2018.

Talking to Canadians: A Memoir was published by Doubleday Canada on November 2, 2021.

The Road Years: A Memoir Continued was published by Doubleday Canada on October 31, 2023.

== Awards ==
Mercer has received more than 25 Gemini Awards for his television work. He has also won the Sir Peter Ustinov Comedy Award, presented to him at the 2003 Banff Television Festival. In 1993, Newfoundland premier Clyde Wells honoured Mercer with the Newfoundland Arts Council's Artist of the Year award. In 2004, Mercer was presented with the National Arts Centre Award, a companion award of the Governor General's Performing Arts Awards. He donated his $15,000 cash prize to the LSPU hall, the theatre in Newfoundland where Mercer performed his early work.

He holds honorary degrees from Laurentian University in Sudbury, Memorial University of Newfoundland in St. John's, Brock University in St. Catharines, McMaster University in Hamilton, Bishop's University in Lennoxville, the University of British Columbia, the University of Guelph, the University of Western Ontario in London, and the Royal Military College of Canada in Kingston He received an honorary high school diploma for his outstanding efforts and determination from Landmark East School in Wolfville, Nova Scotia in 1999.

Mercer was awarded the 30th Annual Bob Edwards Award in Calgary.

In 2007, he was named honorary colonel of the Royal Canadian Air Force's 423 Maritime Helicopter Squadron, based at CFB Shearwater in Shearwater, Nova Scotia.

On June 30, 2014, Mercer was appointed an Officer of the Order of Canada by David Johnston, Governor General of Canada, for "his ability to inspire and challenge Canadians through humour" and his work with charitable causes. He was formally invested into the Order in a ceremony at Rideau Hall on September 23, 2015. The same year, he was inducted into the Canadian Disability Hall of Fame. In 2019, Mercer received the Lifetime Artistic Achievement Award as part of the Governor General's Performing Arts Awards.

His memoir Talking to Canadians was the winner of the 2022 Stephen Leacock Memorial Medal for Humour.

In 2023, he was appointed a Member of the Order of Newfoundland and Labrador.

== Spokesperson and endorsements ==
Mercer is co-chair, along with Belinda Stronach, in the Spread the Net campaign, partnered through UNICEF, which kicked off at Brock University on September 10, 2008. Spread the Net provides bed nets for $10 each to prevent the spread of malaria among children in Africa.

In December 2004, Mercer appeared on the commercials advertising the One-Tonne Challenge for the Government of Canada. Mercer also appeared as a model in a national ad for men's clothing store, Harry Rosen, wearing a Canali suit. All of Mercer's fees for the campaign went to Casey House, a hospice in Toronto for people living with AIDS. Casey House was founded by June Callwood, who appeared as a celebrity guest on Monday Report.

In September 2005, Mercer became the national spokesperson for the 2005 Walk For Life, a series of 132 fund-raising walks across Canada that raise money for people living with HIV and AIDS. The Walk for Life is a project of the Canadian AIDS Society.

Mercer has narrated an animated science video on climate change for Science North in Sudbury.

In November 2010, Mercer joined the It Gets Better campaign, a series of videos that aim to help gay and lesbian youth overcome bullying.

Since 2011, Mercer has been honorary patron of Hope Air, a charity that provides free non-emergency medical flights for people in financial need.

== Personal life ==
Mercer was born in St. John's, Newfoundland and raised in Middle Cove. His mother, Patricia Cook, is a nurse and his father, Kenneth Mercer, is an executive in the fisheries ministry. Growing up he attended Macdonald Drive Elementary and dropped out of Prince of Wales Collegiate in St. John's before completing his diploma requirements. He was a member of the Royal Canadian Sea Cadets during his teen years.

Mercer's spouse since 1990 is television producer Gerald Lunz. He regards his personal life as private and says little about it in public beyond acknowledging that he is gay; in a 2011 interview on CBC Radio One's The Current, he clarified that he tries "to live [his] life as an out gay man" but doesn't specifically mention his sexuality on Rick Mercer Report because it's just "not what the show is about".

== Bibliography ==
- Mercer, Rick (1998). Streeters : rants & raves from "This hour has 22 minutes". Doubleday Canada. ISBN 9780385257176.
- —— (2007). Rick Mercer Report: The Book. Doubleday Canada. ISBN 9780385665186.
- —— (2008). Rick Mercer Report: The Paperback Book. Anchor Canada. ISBN 9780385665193.
- —— (2012). A Nation Worth Ranting About. Doubleday Canada. ISBN 9780385676816.
- —— (2021). Talking to Canadians. Doubleday Canada. ISBN 9780385696234.
- —— (2023). The Road Years. Penguin Random House Canada. ISBN 9780385688901.
