= Spread the Net =

- Founder: Belinda Stronach and Rick Mercer
- Location: Toronto, Ontario, Canada
- Region served: Uganda, Rwanda, Liberia, Guinea
- Website: spreadthenet.ca

Spread the Net is a charitable organization that aims to reduce malaria in African nations. It was co-founded by Rick Mercer, a Canadian satirist, and Belinda Stronach, a former Canadian Member of Parliament and philanthropist. A partnership with UNICEF Canada has allowed Spread the Net to achieve the goal of distributing 500,000 insecticide-treated bed nets to Liberia and Rwanda. Spread the Net now works with its partners to combat malaria. The campaign has donated over 539,000 nets since its founding.

== History ==
In 2006, Rick Mercer and Belinda Stronach travelled to Africa along with Professor Jeffrey D. Sachs, director of the UN Millennium Project, in preparation to co-host the Millennium Promise Convention in Montreal on November 9, 2006. At the convention, Mercer and Stronach, along with Jeffrey Sachs and Nigel Fisher, President and CEO of UNICEF Canada, announced their intention to begin the Spread the Net campaign and raise $5 million for insecticide treated bed nets to be given to children and pregnant women in Liberia and Rwanda. One X One founder Joey Adler and Millennium Promise Conference founder Daniel Germain each gave $150,000 to the campaign at the conference. The first order for 33,000 bed nets was made on March 28, 2007.

By December 2011, Spread the Net achieved its founding goal; 500,000 nets distributed to pregnant women and children in Liberia and Rwanda. Spread the Net has teamed with Plan Canada, working together to deliver another 250,000 nets, this time to Guinea.

In 2012, Spread the Net partnered together with the Mosquitoes Suck Tour, a 60-minute performance act for high school students across Canada.

=== Student Challenge ===
In 2007, Spread the Net started fund raising in Canadian Schools. Between 2007 and 2008 over 250 schools participated raising $300,000. The competition has been presented to schools across Canada, and the school that raises the most to donate would be visited by Rick Mercer. The challenge includes post-secondary, secondary, and elementary school divisions, and one wild-card winner. In the 2010 edition, the challenge featured an additional twist by inviting schools in east to compete with their counterparts in the west, resulting in two post-secondary level winners.

==== Winners ====
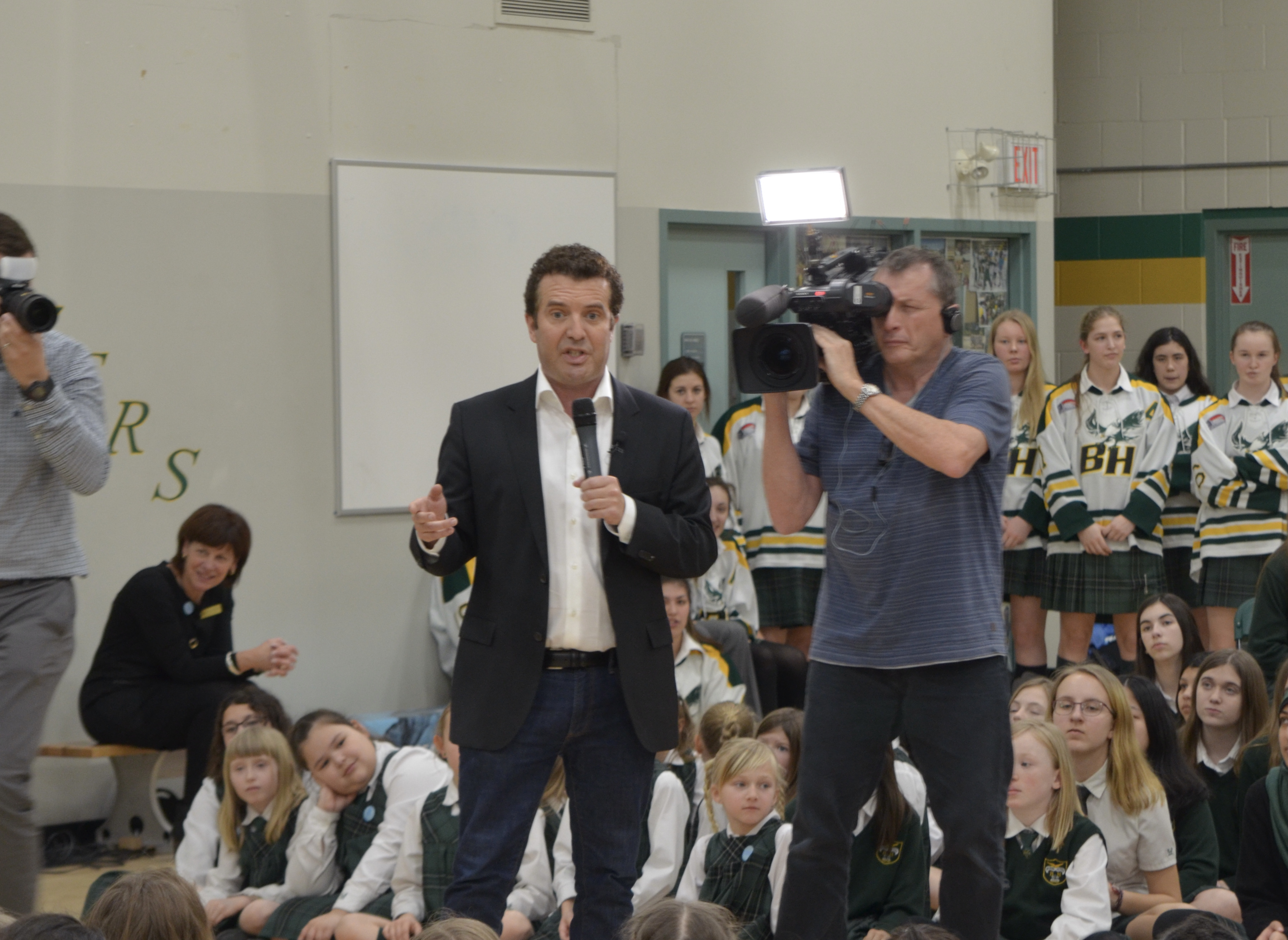
Rick Mercer filming a 2016 Spread the Net Student Challenge segment for the Rick Mercer Report at the 2016 top secondary school, Balmoral Hall School

Year	Winner
2007	Dalhousie University
2008	Dalhousie University
2009	John F. Ross Collegiate and Vocational Institute
2010	Simon Fraser University; University of Ottawa
2011	University of Northern British Columbia; Espanola High School
2012	McGill University; Peterborough Collegiate and Vocational School; Lakefield Elementary School
2013	Algonquin College; Almonte and District High School; Pleasantdale School
2014	Algonquin College; John F. Ross Collegiate and Vocational Institute; Elbow Valley Elementary School
2015	Algonquin College; John F. Ross Collegiate and Vocational Institute; Kew Beach Junior Public School
2016	Algonquin College; Balmoral Hall School; Macville Public School; Central Algoma Secondary School
2017	Langara College; Father Mercredi High School; Beaverly Elementary; R. A. Riddell School
2018	Dalhousie University; Kincardine District Secondary School; Holy Names High School; Stewarttown Middle School

== See also ==
- Jeffrey Sachs
- Nothing But Nets
- Millennium Promise
- Malaria No More
