= Farah Mohamed =

Canadian senator

The Honourable Farah Mohamed
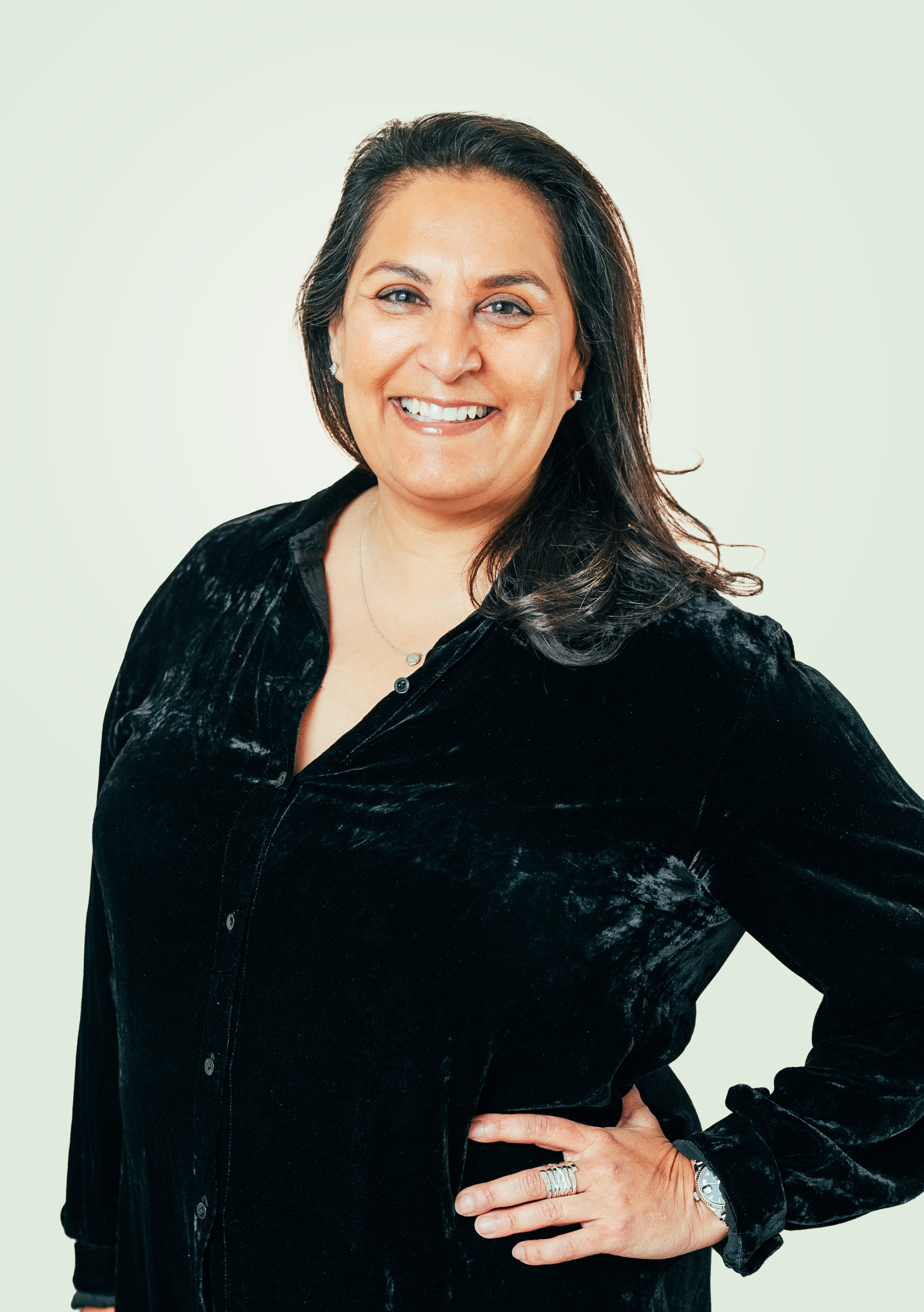
- Farah Mohamed (2025)

Senator for Ontario
- Incumbent
- Assumed office 7 March 2025
- Nominated by: Justin Trudeau
- Appointed by: Mary Simon

Personal details
- Born: 5 July 1970 (age 56) Kampala, Uganda
- Party: Independent Senators Group

Farah Mohamed (born 5 July 1970) is a Canadian Senator, former CEO of the King’s Trust Canada, former CEO of the Malala Fund, a non-profit founded by Nobel laureate Malala Yousafzai. She is the founder of G(irls)20, now called Fora.

Mohamed is the recipient of a Meritorious Service Medal, a Queen Elizabeth II Diamond Jubilee Medal and the Coronation Medal and one of the recipients of the Top 25 Canadian Immigrant Awards, presented by Canadian Immigrant magazine. In 2014, she was also recognized as one of the BBC's 100 women. On two occasions she was named a Women of Influence. She was appointed to the Senate of Canada in March 2025.

== Early life and education ==
Born in Kampala, Uganda, Mohamed came to Canada as a refugee at the age of 2.

She holds a Bachelor of Arts from Queens University and a Master of Arts and an Honorary Doctorate of Laws from the University of Western Ontario.

== Career ==
Mohamed worked as a political aide earlier in her career to Burlington MP Paddy Torsney and as a ministerial aide to former Deputy Prime Minister Anne McLellan for an extended period while McLellan held the justice, health, and public safety portfolio. She later headed the charitable foundation founded by Belinda Stronach from 2008 to 2011.

In 2010, Mohamed founded G(irls)20, an annual leadership event for young women held in advance of the G20 summit. Mohamed served as CEO of the Malala Fund, a non-profit founded by Nobel laureate Malala Yousafzai and headed the public affairs team at the Toronto Region Board of Trade. In 2024 she was appointed the CEO of King’s Trust Canada, the Canadian arm of the youth charity founded by King Charles.

She remained in this role until her appointment to the Senate.

== Senate ==
On March 7, 2025, Mohamed was appointed to the Senate of Canada on the advice of Prime Minister Justin Trudeau as a representative for Ontario, two days before Trudeau was due to be replaced as Liberal Party leader. She was among a group of five senators who were Trudeau's final Senate appointments, announced two months after Trudeau had announced his pending resignation, that included former provincial Liberal ministers Sandra Pupatello and Tony Ince, Moncton mayor Dawn Arnold and non-profit executive Katherine Hay.

Mohammed joined the Independent Senators Group on June 3, 2025.
