= Frank Walker (musician) =

Canadian electronic musician and DJ

- Origin: Toronto, Ontario, Canada
- Genres: EDM; progressive house • dance-pop
- Occupations: Musician; songwriter; DJ; record producer
- Years active: 2016–present
- Labels: FSW Entertainment; Nightfuel Records; Astralwerks (US1A)

Frank Walker is a Canadian electronic musician and DJ. He is most noted for his single "Only When It Rains", a collaboration with Astrid S which was a Juno Award nominee for Dance Recording of the Year at the Juno Awards of 2020.

== Early life and education ==
The son of Canadian business executives Donald J. Walker and Belinda Stronach, Frank Walker was groomed by his family for a career with the family company, Magna International which was founded by his grandfather Frank Stronach. He played trombone while attending The Country Day School in King City, Ontario.

As a teenager, he worked various jobs at Magna, including a year in the research and development department in addition to a year working at one of the Ontario plants. He began to pursue music as a hobby while studying business at Wilfrid Laurier University in Waterloo, Ontario and cites one party for the university's rugby team as being foundational.

== Career ==
After graduating from the university, he decided to pursue music instead of taking a job with Magna and released his debut EP Nocturnal in 2016. The EP 24 followed in 2017. The singles "Heartbreak Back" with Riley Biederer on vocals, and "Footprints" with Callum Stewart, followed in 2018, in addition to "Only When It Rains" being released in 2019. On May 24, 2024, Walker released his debut studio album called Origin. The album has said by Walker to be a callback to progressive house and the golden era of electronic dance music of the 2010s. In January 2024, he opened two Toronto dates on Madonna's The Celebration Tour.

== Discography ==
=== Studio albums ===
List of studio albums, showing release date, label and formats
Title	Details
Origin	Released: May 24, 2024; Label: Sony Music, FSW; Formats: Digital download, streaming
Oasis	Released: May 29, 2026; Label: Sony Music, FSW; Formats: Digital download, streaming

=== Extended plays ===
List of EPs, showing release date, label and formats
Title	Details
Nocturnal	Released: March 25, 2016; Label: Nightfuel Records; Formats: Digital download, streaming
24	Released: March 24, 2017; Label: Nightfuel; Formats: Digital download, streaming

=== Singles ===
List of singles, showing year released, selected chart positions, certifications, and album name
Title	Year	Peak chart positions					Certifications	Album/EP
Title	Year	CAN	CAN AC	CAN CHR/Top 40	CAN HAC	US Dance	Certifications	Album/EP
"All I Want"	2016	—	—	—	—	—		Nocturnal
"Toes" (featuring Rykka)	2016	—	—	—	—	—		Non-album singles
"Run with the Real" (featuring Davs)	2016	—	—	—	—	—		Non-album singles
"Young" (featuring Andrew Jackson)	2017	—	—	—	—	—		24
"Less Lonely"	2017	—	—	35	—	—		24
"Piano" (featuring Emily Warren)	2017	—	—	—	—	—		Non-album singles
"Leave the Light On" (featuring BullySongs)	2017	—	—	—	—	—		Non-album singles
"Footprints" (featuring Callum Stewart)	2018	—	—	—	—	—		Non-album singles
"Heartbreak Back" (featuring Riley Biederer)	2018	79	14	8	17	—	MC: Gold	Non-album singles
"Stitch Em Up" (featuring Justin Jesso)	2019	—	—	—	—	—		Non-album singles
"Only When It Rains" (with Astrid S)	2019	81	—	8	21	—	MC: Gold	Non-album singles
"More Than OK" (with R3hab and Clara Mae)	2020	—	—	—	—	22		Non-album singles
"Can't Let Go" (with Harry Hudson)	2020	—	—	—	—	—		Non-album singles
"Dancing in the Dark"	2020	—	—	—	—	—		Non-album singles
"Imagine" (with Steve Aoki featuring AJ Mitchell)	2020	—	—	—	—	42		Non-album singles
"Like Gold" (with Loud Luxury featuring Stephen Puth)	2020	41	—	8	33	26	MC: 2× Platinum	Non-album singles
"Kiss Me" (with Theresa Rex)	2021	—	—	—	—	—		Non-album singles
"Shadows" (with Sophie Simmons and Nevada)	2021	—	—	28	49	—		Non-album singles
"Feel Like Us Again" (with Amber Van Day)	2021	—	—	45	—	—		Non-album singles
"I Wonder" (with MOTi featuring Shai)	2021	—	—	—	—	—		Non-album singles
"Day by Day" (with Two Feet)	2022	—	—	—	—	—		Non-album singles
"Break the Same" (with Mattn)	2022	—	—	—	—	—		Non-album singles
"Madness" (with Sam Feldt featuring Zak Abel)	2022	—	—	50	—	—		Non-album singles
"Dance on My Own" (featuring Richard Judge)	2022	—	—	—	—	—		Non-album singles
"I Go Dancing" (featuring Ella Henderson)	2023	80	—	7	31	48	MC: Gold	Origin
"Waiting" (featuring Stephen Puth)	2023	—	—	—	—	—		Origin
"Something in the Way" (with Forester)	2023	—	—	—	—	—		Non-album single
"Good in Goodbye" (with Trivecta)	2023	—	—	—	—	—		Origin
"Missing You" (featuring Nate Smith)	2024	—	28	10	18	—		Origin
"Bad Town" (with Lucas Estrada)	2024	—	—	—	—	—		Origin
"Youngblood" (featuring Josh Breaks)	2024	—	—	—	—	—		Origin
"Gravity" (featuring Tyler Shaw)	2024	—	—	22	—	—		Origin
"Crossfire" (with Alexander Stewart)	2024	—	—	—	—	—		Origin (Deluxe)
"Hurricane" (featuring Clara Mae)	2025	—	—	—	—	—		Non-album singles
"Lay Your Head" (with MC4D and Joe Cleere)	2025	—	—	—	—	—		Non-album singles
"What Love Feels Like" (with Nathan Nicholson)	2025	—	—	—	—	—		Oasis
"Lay It on Me" (with Josh Ross and Norma Jean Martine)	2025	—	28	29	—	—		Oasis
"Run with the Sun" (with Vavo and Bryce Vine)	2026	—	—	—	—	—		Oasis
"Ocean Eyes" (with Telykast and Steerner featuring Jazara)	2026	—	—	—	—	—		Oasis
"All Cried Out" (with Salem Ilese)	2026	—	—	—	—	—		Oasis
"All My Life" (with Timmy Trumpet featuring John Martin)	2026	—	—	—	—	—		Non-album single
"Sky" (with Arty featuring Zeke Finn)	2026	—	—	—	—	—		Oasis
"Missing Piece" (with Alexander Stewart)	2026	—	—	—	—	—		Non-album single
"—" denotes a recording that did not chart or was not released.
