= Donald J. Walker =

Canadian automotive executive

- Born: Canada
- Education: University of Waterloo
- Occupation: Automotive executive
- Spouse: Belinda Stronach (m. 1990; div. 1995) Joan Weisshaar (m. 2000)
- Children: Frank Walker, Nicole (Nikki) Walker

Donald J. Walker is a Canadian automotive executive and former chief executive officer of Magna International Inc., a Canadian global automotive supplier. He has worked in the automotive industry since 1980. In 2017, he was listed as the second highest-paid CEO in Canada.

== Early life and education ==
Walker grew up in Toronto, Ontario, and attended the University of Waterloo's mechanical engineering program, which he graduated in 1980.

== Career ==
Walker began his career in the automotive industry working for General Motors. From 1980 to 1987, he held various engineering and manufacturing positions at the company. In 1987, wanting to start his own automotive company, he met with Frank Stronach, founder of Magna International, to see if he would be interested in establishing a joint venture. After several meetings, Stronach offered Walker a position at Magna, which he accepted.

=== Magna International ===
In 1987, Walker moved from General Motors to work at Magna International. He began at Magna working on various engineering and joint venture projects, and served as Executive Vice President of Operations for the company in 1990 when it was facing a company debt crisis.

In 1994, Walker became chief executive officer of Magna, a position he held until 2001.

In 2001, he moved to Intier Automotive, a former unit and majority owned by Magna, to lead Intier as its president and chief executive officer. In 2005, Walker returned to Magna to serve as the company's co-chief executive officer. In 2010, he became sole CEO of Magna.

Walker's fixed and variable salary, including share options, in 2016, was $20.8 million, after $21.2 million in 2015.

In October 2020, it was announced that Walker would retire at the end of 2020, with Seetarama Kotagiri succeeding him in 2021.

== Recognition ==
In 2014, The Globe and Mail listed Walker as Outstanding CEO of the Year. He was also included on Fortune's 2015 "Business Person of the Year" list and in the Globe and Mail's 1996 "Top 40 Under 40" list. In 2017, the Toronto Star included him on their list of "key players to watch in 2017".

== Personal life ==
In 2000, Walker married Joan Weisshaar, now Joan Kelley Walker. They have two children together. Walker also has two children from his previous marriage to Belinda Stronach, including musician Frank Walker.
