= Wolfville Historical Society =

Registered charity in Woodville

Coordinates: 45.09197°N 64.35532°W

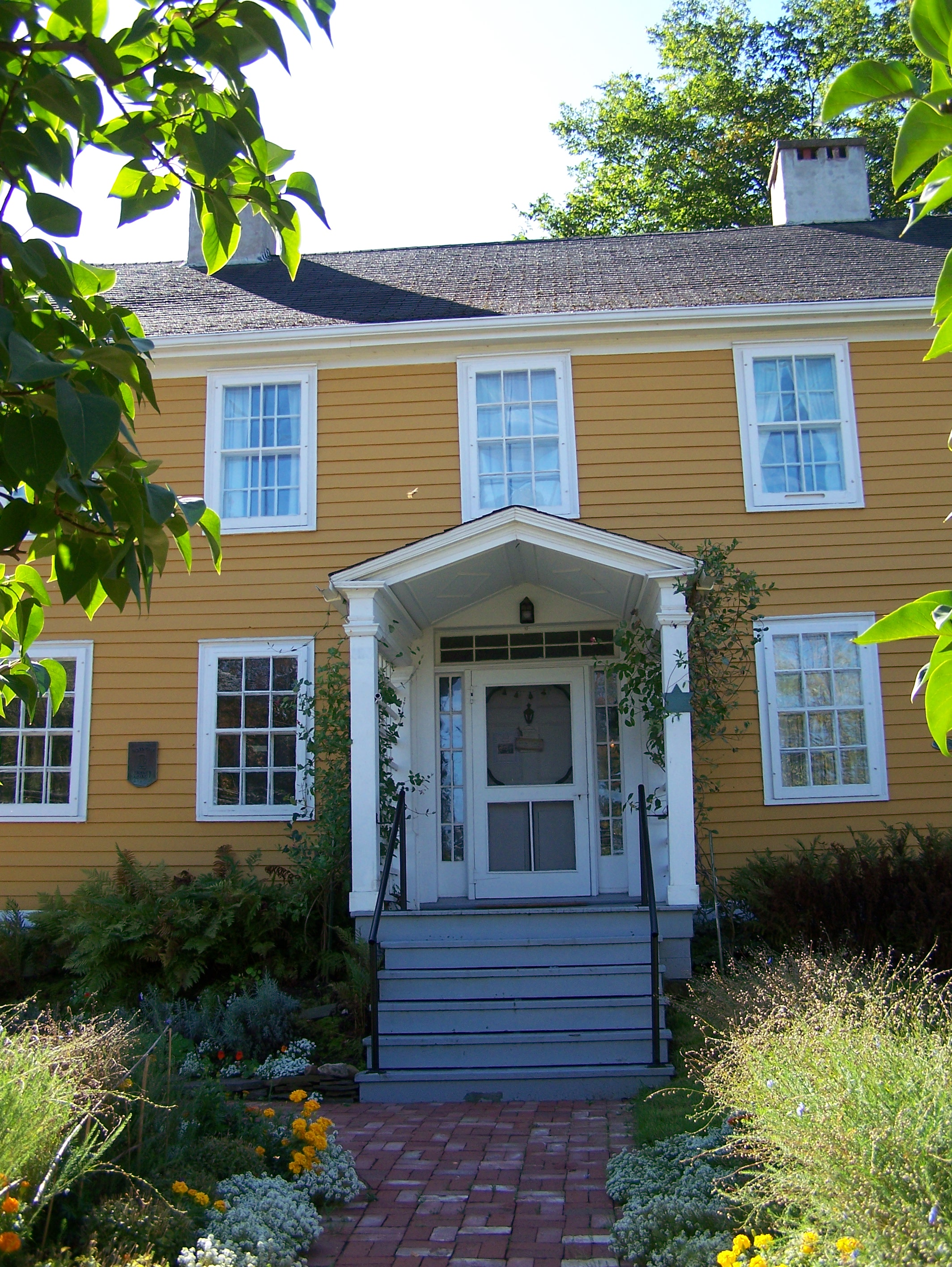
The Randall House Museum, located at 259 Main Street in Wolfville, Nova Scotia.

The Wolfville Historical Society is a registered charity that owns and maintains the Randall House Museum in Wolfville, Nova Scotia. This building dates from c.1812 and is operated as a seasonal museum, open to the public from June to September. The society collects, conserves, exhibits and stores artifacts and documents from the local area, and interprets the house, rooms, contents and the garden. Archives of documents and photographs are available to the public. The Society also supports the publication of books written about Wolfville's history.

The Wolfville Historical Society was founded in 1941 by a group of citizens who rented the DeWolf house to save it from demolition and turned it into a museum. In 1946, the owners, the Wolfville Fruit Company, wanted to use the site and the museum opened at the Randall House in 1949.

== Collections and programs ==
The museum's library holds a number of local history books, genealogical records and deeds. Other materials are held in joint custody with the Esther Clark Wright Archives at Acadia University. This collection contains a wide range of letters, photographs and printed materials mainly from the 20th century. It also holds some audio and video recordings. Many artifacts are on view throughout the house. One set of chairs was brought to Nova Scotia by a New England Planters in 1760.

It also has in storage a collection of domestic garments, some dating from the 18th century, and including clothing from the family of prime minister Robert Borden.

== The Randall House ==
Randall House is a wooden 2 1/2-storey Georgian style farmhouse dating from the late eighteenth century. The front of the house has a symmetrical five bay façade with a pedimented gable porch on Doric columns. The front door has a transom window with sidelights. The house has a steep-pitched gable roof and the walls are sided with clapboard with wide corner boards. The house is built over a dry stone wall with earthen floor. There are seven fireplaces in the house.

While the date of construction is unknown, the first recorded owner of the house was Aaron Cleveland, a tradesman living in Wolfville around 1805. On 14 November 1812, Cleveland sold the property to a carpenter by the name of Charles Randall. Upon his death in 1856, the property passed to his son, Charles Dennison Randall, listed as a prosperous English-descended Baptist magistrate. When he died in 1893, his will stated that the property was to be split between his daughters, Elizabeth and Annie. Eardley Randall spent most of his time caring for "sister" Annie, who was an invalid and never left the house. Eardley Randall's initials are still carved into the attic's staircase. Under Eardley's ownership, the property gained a reputation of neglect, and often was regarded as a spooky place by the town children. In 1927, Eardley and Elizabeth sold the land to a merchant, William C.B. Harris, who in turn sold it to the retired farmer, Charles Patriquin. Over the course of his retirement, C.A. Patriquin spent time and money to brighten up the area of Wolfville now known as Willow Park, next to the Randall House. Until then, it had been a swampy area and an eyesore. He passed the land on to his son, Graham, in 1932. Graham Patriquin sold the Randall House in 1947, and the Wolfville Historical Society now leases the property for one dollar a year. The Randall House Museum was opened up in 1949. It won status as a Nova Scotia Provincial Heritage Property in 1987. For the past four years, the Wolfville Historical Society has been following a program to renovate the Randall House Museum, paid for by the donations of its members and the support of the municipal and provincial governments.

== See also ==
- Watson Kirkconnell
