= One-Tonne Challenge =

Canadian government challenge against climate change

One Tonne Challenge Logo

The One-Tonne Challenge was a challenge presented by the Government of Canada in March 2004 for Canadians to reduce their greenhouse gas emissions by one tonne each year. The figure represented 20% of total greenhouse gas output by Canadians at the time and aimed to help the country reach its Kyoto Protocol emission reduction targets. The Liberal Government under Jean Chrétien and Paul Martin approved over $45 million to fund the program from 2003 to 2006.

To promote this program, the government placed television and print ads featuring comedian Rick Mercer. In one commercial, he described Canadians as wanting to take the challenge. "C’mon... we’re Canadian... we’re up for a challenge!"

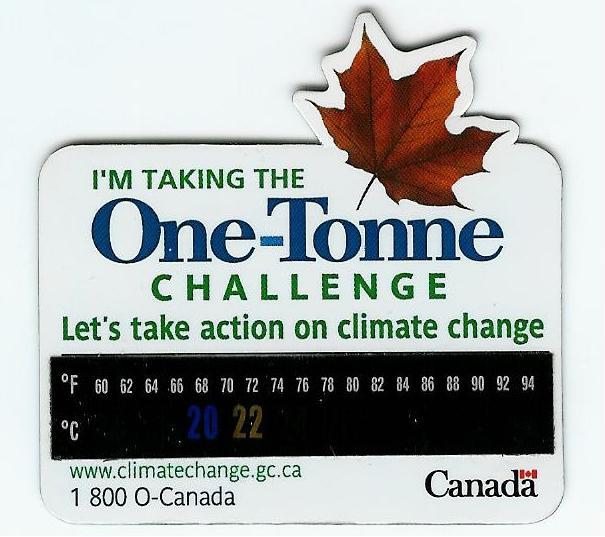
A magnet with a temperature indictator given to high school students as promotional giveaways.

The government urged Canadians to do such things as:

- take public transit more often
- idle vehicles less
- use programmable thermostats
- seal windows with caulking and weather-stripping
- compost organic kitchen waste
- support green energy
- water and energy conservation
- purchase electronics that are labelled with the Energy Star logo
- recycling

The program received an indifferent reception from the public, and has been criticized as ineffective and wasteful.

This program was started by the Liberal Party of Canada. However, with the election of Stephen Harper's Conservative Government in 2006, the One Tonne Challenge was scrapped.

== See also ==
- Air pollution
- Chlorofluorocarbons
- Recycling
