= Heather Barnabe =

Girls20's CEO

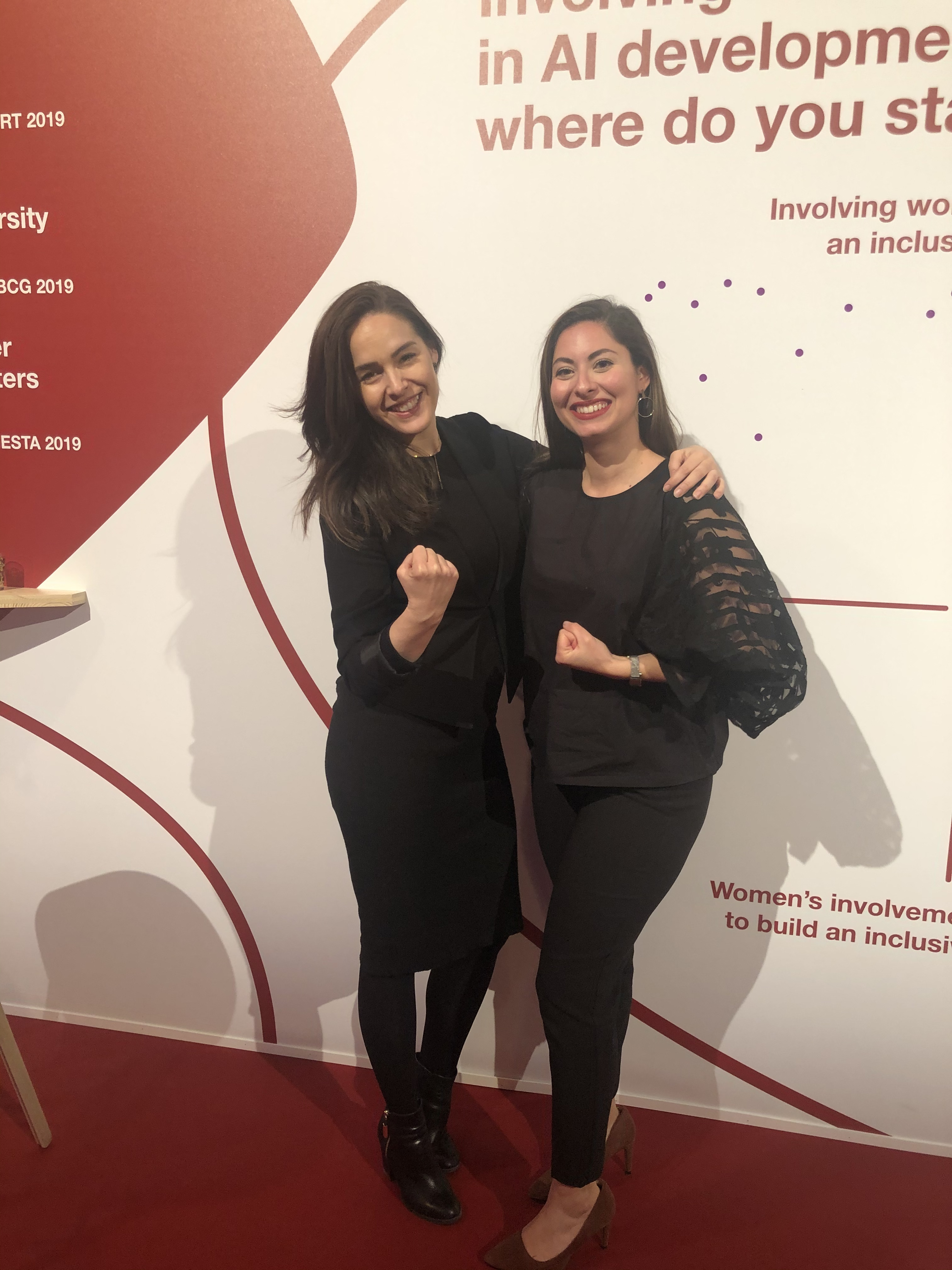
Heather Barnabe and Sally Dimachki.

Heather Barnabe (/ˈbɑːrnəbi/ BARN-ə-bee) is the CEO of G(irls)20, an NGO that empowers young women and girls to become leaders through training and education. Prior to joining G(irls)20, Barnabe worked for other non-profits for more than a decade. Barnabe has stated that her passion for training young women stems from the lack of mentorship opportunities currently available.

== G(irls)20 ==
In 2017, Barnabe became the CEO of G(irls)20. G(irls)20 is a Canadian NGO founded by Farah Mohamed to encourage and empower girls in the areas of education and technology. It is responsible for recruiting women to board positions. Each year, they organize the Girls20 Global Summit based on the model of the G20 Summit. Barnabe is leading the organization to help inspire and train a new generation of girls to take leadership positions.
