= Belinda Stronach =

Canadian politician (born 1966)

The Honourable Belinda Stronach PC
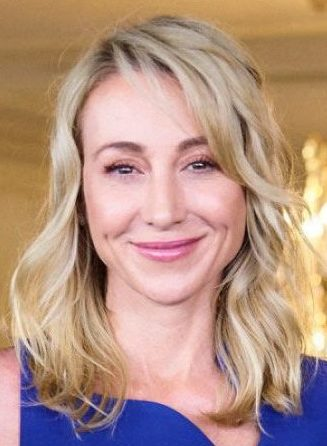
- Stronach in February 2018

Minister of Human Resources and Skills Development
- In office May 17, 2005 – February 5, 2006
- Prime Minister: Paul Martin
- Preceded by: Lucienne Robillard
- Succeeded by: Diane Finley (Human Resources and Social Development)

Member of Parliament for Newmarket—Aurora
- In office June 28, 2004 – October 14, 2008
- Preceded by: Riding established
- Succeeded by: Lois Brown

Personal details
- Born: Belinda Caroline Stronach; May 2, 1966 (age 60) Newmarket, Ontario, Canada
- Party: Liberal (2005–present)
- Other political affiliations: Conservative (before 2005)
- Spouse(s): Donald J. Walker (m. 1990; div. 1995), Johann Olav Koss (m. 1999; div. 2002)
- Children: 2, including Frank Walker
- Parent: Frank Stronach (father)
- Occupation: Chairman, Chief Executive Officer and President, The Stronach Group

Belinda Caroline Stronach (born May 2, 1966) is a Canadian businesswoman and former politician. She served as a Member of Parliament (MP) from 2004 to 2008, initially as a Conservative and later as a Liberal. During her political career, Stronach served as the Minister of Human Resources and Skills Development from May 17, 2005, to February 6, 2006, and Minister responsible for Democratic Renewal from May 17, 2005, to February 6, 2006, both in Paul Martin's Cabinet.

The daughter of businessman Frank Stronach, she assumed leadership roles in Magna International and The Stronach Group after leaving politics.

== Early life ==
Stronach was born in Newmarket, Ontario, Canada, to Austrian parents Elfriede Sallmutter and Frank Stronach, the Magna International founder and chairman. She graduated from Newmarket High School and in 1985 attended York University in Toronto, where she studied business and economics for a year before dropping out to work at Magna.

Stronach received an honorary doctorate from Brock University in St. Catharines, Ontario in June 2009 for her charity work with Rick Mercer on Spread the Net.

== Professional career ==
=== Magna International ===
Stronach was hired by her father in 1985 to work at Magna International. She served as a member of the board of directors from 1988 to 2004. In 1995, she became vice president of the company and four years later, she was promoted to executive vice president and later president.

In February 2001, she was appointed CEO of Magna, succeeding Donald J. Walker, who became the CEO of Magna's spinoff, Intier Automotive Inc. In January 2002, she also assumed the role of president. She ended the company's dispute with the United Auto Workers before the National Labour Relations Board. The union successfully organized numerous Magna workers in the United States.

She also chaired the boards of Decoma International, Tesma International, and Intier Automotive, all within the auto parts sector.

In December 2010, Stronach resigned her position as executive vice-chairman and her position as board member at Magna International Inc. in what the Toronto Star called "a surprise move that reflects a shift in boardroom power", after the Stronach family gave up control earlier in 2010.

=== The Stronach Group ===
After leaving Magna, Stronach and her father founded The Stronach Group in mid-2011. As of March 2021, Stronach is chairman, chief executive officer and President of The Stronach Group. The Stronach Group is a horse racing, entertainment and pari-mutuel wagering technology company. The Stronach Group horse racing industry brands include:

- Santa Anita Park — named in 2025 as the host venue for all equestrian events at the LA28 Olympic Summer Games, and host of the Santa Anita Show Jumping series since 2024
- "The Great Race Place"
- Gulfstream Park, home to the $16-million Pegasus World Cup Invitational
- Golden Gate Fields, closed as of June 2024
- Portland Meadows
- Rosecroft Raceway
- Stronach Properties Inc., provides land use solutions by managing and developing property surrounding the company's racetracks.

The Stronach Group's holdings previously included Pimlico Race Course, home of the Preakness Stakes, and Laurel Park Race Course. In 2024, the company agreed to transfer ownership of Pimlico to the State of Maryland. In 2026, the State of Maryland finalized an $85 million deal to acquire the rights to the Preakness Stakes, and later that year also acquired Laurel Park for conversion into a training center.

The Stronach Group uses pari-mutuel technology through its subsidiaries AmTote and Xpressbet and is a distributor of horse racing content to audiences through Monarch Content Management. Their consumer-facing brand, "1/ST" (pronounced "first"), is a dominant player in North American Thoroughbred horse racing. It holds nearly 20% of industry share and, every year, processes over US$3.2 billion in wagers.

In response to an increase in incidents of injuries and horse fatalities, Stronach has pushed for reforms focused on horse and rider safety and welfare.

=== Other ventures ===
On November 9, 2006, Belinda Stronach co-chaired the Millennium Promise Convention in Montreal with Canadian television personality Rick Mercer. The event was a national campaign to mobilize Canadians to combat malaria in Africa, a leading cause of death among children in the region. Stronach and Mercer co-founded Spread the Net, a charity organization that has raised funds to distribute insecticide-treated bed nets to families in Africa, significantly reducing malaria transmission.

In 2008, Stronach established The Belinda Stronach Foundation to support initiatives focused on youth, girls, and women's development and health. The foundation collaborated with various organizations, including The Tony Blair Faith Foundation, The Clinton Foundation, ONE, and Malaria No More. In 2010, the foundation brought the One Laptop Per Child Program to Canada, which has since provided educational technology to approximately 9,000 Indigenous students across Canada.

That same year, The Belinda Stronach Foundation developed and hosted the G(irls)20 Summit. Modeled after the G(20) Summit, The G(irls)20 Summit solicited grassroots ideas on how to reach the Millennium Development Goals (MDGs) that most impact girls and women. The G(irls)20 Summit was launched in Toronto in 2010, followed by Paris, France in 2011. After the two successful summits, the G(irls)20 Summit became an independent organization following its separation from the foundation known as G(irls)20.

In May 2012, Anthony Melman and Stronach announced a partnership and established Acasta Capital Inc. Stronach stepped away from Acasta in July 2017.

Alongside Newmarket Mayor Tony Van Bynen, Stronach established Belinda's Place in 2015. Operated by The Salvation Army and the Regional Municipality of York, Belinda's Place is a center for women who are experiencing or at risk of homelessness.

In February 2016, Stronach, along with business partners Holly Fennell and Canadian marketing executive Beverley Hammond, launched Age Quencher Solutions, a line of all-natural beauty products. Belinda Stronach divested herself of her shares in Age Quencher Solutions in late 2017.

=== Lawsuits ===
In October 2018, Stronach's parents filed a CAN$520 million lawsuit in Ontario Superior Court against her, Stronach's children, and Alon Ossip, former CEO of The Stronach Group. The lawsuit alleged that the defendants "mismanaged the family's chief assets and trust funds while forcing her father out of control of the fortune he created"; additionally alleging that Stronach plotted with Ossip in "a series of covert and unlawful actions...that have been contrary to the best interests of, and to the overwhelming detriment of, other members of the Stronach family."

She filed a CAN$33 million counter-suit in January 2019, denying the alleged mismanagement and claiming she was protecting the family's funds from her father's investments in "idiosyncratic and often unprofitable projects".

Both suits were settled by August 2020, divvying up the contested holdings. She retained full control of The Stronach Group and related assets. Her parents gained sole control of the remaining agricultural related businesses.

== Political career ==
In the 2000 Canadian Alliance leadership election, she supported Preston Manning. In his memoir Think Big, Manning recalls Stronach at his second-ballot campaign launch in Toronto delivering "a substantive introduction in which she clearly explained why she wanted the Alliance and my candidacy to succeed", and he later thanked her for "unflagging support" in that campaign.

In 2003, Ontario Premier Ernie Eves had his Minister of Finance, Janet Ecker, present the government's budget at a televised press conference at Magna's headquarters rather than before the Legislative Assembly of Ontario, as was the tradition. The "Magna Budget" resulted in accusations that the government was trying to avoid the scrutiny of the legislature and was flouting centuries of parliamentary tradition in favour of a PR stunt. Furthermore, the expense of this move was condemned as a waste of money considering that the legislative chamber was already equipped with video equipment for televised coverage. Speaker Gary Carr ruled that by not presenting the budget before the legislature, the Eves government was prima facie in contempt of the legislature—a ruling that was later overturned by the full chamber. The episode was a factor in the Tories' defeat in the provincial election held later that year.

=== 2004 Conservative leadership campaign ===
Throughout the summer and into the fall of 2003, officials from the Canadian Alliance and the Progressive Conservatives engaged in talks regarding a potential merger of the two parties. Vote-splitting between the two right-wing parties had enabled the Liberals to dominate Canadian politics for a decade. Meetings between the parties were overseen by a facilitator, who was later revealed to have been Stronach. She was among many who had called for PC leader Peter MacKay and Canadian Alliance leader Stephen Harper to undertake the merger talks in the first place.

In 2004, Stronach contested the leadership of the newly formed Conservative Party. As a candidate for leadership of the new party, she drew a great deal of publicity to the race. However, many in the media saw her first foray into politics as sophomoric. Some critics argued that her campaign relied heavily on professional staff and support from Magna associates.

Some of the media reaction to Stronach's candidacy was criticized. Casting Stronach as an "heiress" with a "coddled career" — to the point of joking comparisons to Paris Hilton— and the attention paid to her physical appearance and personal life, was described by a commentator as patronizing and sexist. Supporters cited her age, corporate experience, and personal background, private life as a "soccer mom", and her potential to win new and swing voters, especially moderate, socially progressive voters in the province of Ontario.

On February 11, 2004, she declined to participate in a debate between the Conservative party candidates, leaving Tony Clement and Stephen Harper to debate each other on a Canadian Broadcasting Corporation broadcast. She later also skipped a March 14 debate on the Global Television Network. She argued that she ought only to participate in party-sponsored debates, rather than picking and choosing among those organized by outside sponsors. Critics saw this as her way of avoiding a debate with the other two candidates.

In her major speech at the leadership convention on March 19, 2004, she promised to serve only two terms if she became prime minister and to draw no salary. She announced that she would not follow a prepared script during her speech, but then undercut this when she was seen referring to cue cards. On March 20, 2004, she finished second to Harper with 23% of the vote.

=== Member of Parliament ===
In the 2004 federal election, she was narrowly elected as the MP for Newmarket—Aurora by a margin of 689 votes over Liberal Martha Hall Findlay. She was appointed the International Trade critic in the Official Opposition Shadow Cabinet.

Before crossing the floor of the House of Commons, Stronach represented the socially progressive face of the Conservative Party. Along with Peter MacKay, she was seen as giving the Conservatives a more moderate image.

Stronach was generally to the left of her Conservative caucus colleagues, supporting abortion rights, gun control and same-sex marriage. During her Conservative leadership campaign, she called for a free vote in parliament, with votes cast individually and not along party lines, on same-sex marriage. She spoke and voted in favour of same-sex marriage when the issue came before the House of Commons in 2005; a position she re-affirmed as a Liberal in 2006. Social conservative elements in Canada were critical of Stronach, calling her a "Red Tory". During Stronach's leadership campaign, REAL Women of Canada said: "If Ms. Stronach is elected as leader of the Conservative Party, social conservatives will no longer have a voice in Canada." Stronach, for her part, promised after the leadership race that she would do her best to keep the party from moving too far to the right. She cited discomfort with Stephen Harper and the Conservatives' policies as one of her reasons for crossing the floor.

Stronach supported trade with the United States but said she would like to re-examine and review parts of the North American Free Trade Agreement (NAFTA) to ensure, in her view, that Canadians can stand on a more equal footing with U.S. competitors. During her leadership campaign she said the country needed to consider changes to the Medicare system that would respect the principles of the Canada Health Act "as our standard, not our straitjacket".

Stronach is a strong advocate of women's issues. She was elected chair of the Liberal Women's Caucus and spearheaded the development of The Pink Book, a policy framework that advocated a series of proposals to deal with the most pressing social and economic issues facing Canadian women. In 2005, she won the "In Celebration of Women: Achievements and Initiatives" award, and in 2010 she received the EVE award from Equal Voice in recognition of her philanthropic and political contributions to the promotion of women in public life.

==== Crossing the floor ====
In May 2005, Stronach suggested publicly that forcing an early election, especially before passing that year's federal budget, was risky and could backfire on the Tories. Harper wanted to force an early election in the wake of testimony at the Gomery Commission damaging to the Liberals. The Tories planned to bring down the government by voting against an amendment to the budget that the Liberals had made to gain New Democratic Party (NDP) support. Since this would be a loss of supply, it would have brought down the government.

However, on May 17, 2005, two days before the crucial vote, Stronach announced that she was crossing the floor and joining the Liberal Party. Her decision to join the Liberals was facilitated by former Ontario Liberal Premier David Peterson. Stronach immediately joined the cabinet as Minister of Human Resources and Skills Development and Minister responsible for Democratic Renewal. In the latter portfolio, she was charged with overseeing the implementation of the Gomery Inquiry recommendations, upon their release. She championed the one-member, one-vote policy officially adopted by the Liberal Party of Canada in 2009 in an effort to democratize the Party's leadership election process.

Her decision to quit the Conservative Party came after an uneasy relationship with Stephen Harper. In a press conference after leaving the party, she said that Harper was not sensitive to the needs of all parts of the country, and was jeopardizing national unity by allying himself with the Bloc Québécois to bring down the government. She also stated that the party was too focused on Western Canada and "Western alienation" instead of having a broader and more inclusive focus. She had other concerns about the Conservative attitude to Indigenous issues and that Stephen Harper was abandoning the historic Kelowna Accord negotiated by Paul Martin with First Nations' leaders and that Harper did not support an "urban agenda" that would recognize the challenges faced by Canada's Big Cities. She did not refer to Harper by name in her press conference, instead using the title 'the leader of the Conservative Party.

Stronach's move shifted the balance of power in Parliament and allowed Martin's Liberal minority government to survive for the time being. On May 19, 2005, two crucial confidence motions were voted on in the House of Commons. The first vote, on Bill C-43, the original budget proposal approved by all parties, was passed as expected, with 250 for and 54 against. The second vote was on a new budget amendment (Bill C-48) that included C$4.6 billion in additional spending the Liberals negotiated with NDP leader Jack Layton, to secure the support of NDP MPs. It was on this amendment that the Conservative/Bloc alliance planned to bring down the government. However, the vote resulted in a 152–152 tie. It then fell to the Speaker, Peter Milliken, to cast the deciding vote, which he cast in favour of continuing debate, resulting in the survival of the government. The vote carried with a final count of 153 for and 152 against.

The Liberals used Stronach's defection to paint the Conservative Party as being too extreme for moderate voters in Ontario. The Liberals enjoyed a modest upswing in the polls after earlier being damaged by testimony from Gomery Commission. Some political commentators suggested that the period following Stronach's defection may have been a strategic opportunity for the Liberals to call the election, as Stephen Harper had lost some of his momentum after narrowly failing to bring down the government. Instead, the Liberals were forced into an election when they were brought down by a vote of non-confidence later that year, after revelations from the Gomery Inquiry damaged their popularity. Columnist Andrew Coyne suggested that while her defection helped the Liberals in the short-run to stay in power, it also made Martin appear as a "grasping conniver willing to do and say anything to hang onto power".

===== Reaction =====
Stronach's decision to switch parties just days before the confidence vote drew criticism from both within the Conservative Party and the media. Many questioned her motives, suggesting that her move to the Liberals was driven more by personal ambition than by any moral or political convictions. In a press conference following the announcement, Harper speculated that Stronach had left the party simply to further her own career. At the same time, others praised Stronach for having the courage to leave a party in which she no longer felt comfortable.

Considerable media attention was paid to Peter MacKay, MP, and the deputy leader of the Conservative Party, with whom Stronach had a relationship of several months. Interviewed the day after Stronach departed from his party, he stated that he had learned of her intention to cross the floor mere hours before the public announcement. In an interview conducted at his father's farm, MacKay showed discernible emotion.

The day after Stronach crossed the floor, the reaction in Newmarket—Aurora was mixed. Some of her constituents were upset and expressed a sense of betrayal. Protesters picketed her riding office for several days, demanding a by-election. However, some of her constituents supported her move because they did not want an election and supported the budget.

Stronach's move to the Liberal Party and the speed with which she was given a senior-level cabinet position renewed calls from both parliamentarians and the general public for legislation to prevent such "party-hopping." One month after Stronach crossed the floor, a private member's bill was tabled that would require a by-election to be held within thirty-five days of a member of parliament quitting a party. According to this proposed legislation, the MP would have to sit as an independent until the by-election. The legislation never became law.

NDP MP Pat Martin requested an investigation of Stronach, speculating that she had been promised a senior cabinet post in return for her defection. The Ethics Commissioner of Canada, Bernard Shapiro, refused to investigate her floor-crossing, citing that it was a constitutional right of a prime minister to appoint opposition members to Cabinet.

The Conservatives targeted Stronach for defeat in the 2006 election as part of their larger goal of a breakthrough in Ontario, especially in the Toronto suburbs (popularly known as the 905s). However, while the Conservatives won a minority government, Stronach defeated her Conservative challenger, Lois Brown, by an eight-point margin.

Some of the criticism of Stronach's party switching also came under fire. Political scientist Linda Trimble has argued that the reaction to Stronach's defection to the Liberals was "offensive and sexist", referring to the comments of two provincial legislature members Ontario PC MPP Bob Runciman and Alberta PC Tony Abbott. Runciman told the Toronto radio station CFRB that, "She sort of defined herself as something of a dipstick, an attractive one, but still a dipstick." He apologized for his comments and later elaborated, saying that Stronach failed to adequately express her reasons for defecting from the Conservative Party. Abbott said that Stronach had "whored herself out for power." He apologized for the statement the next day saying that the term "whoring" had been misunderstood from context, and noting that it could be equally used for men and women.

Some observers argued that media coverage of the transition was unfair or gender-biased. The National Post used the front-page headline "Blonde Bombshell", and political cartoonists made reference to Stronach prostituting herself to the Liberal party. Stronach's critics downplayed the sexism of their remarks and accused the Liberals of politicizing the issue to legitimize her crossing the floor.

She had defeated Lois Brown in the Conservative nomination election and barely won her seat in an extremely tight race against Martha Hall Findlay. Stronach's switch to the Liberals meant that Hall Findlay had to forfeit contesting the nomination process, while Lucienne Robillard lost one of her portfolios to Stronach.

Since she started her career in politics, Stronach has made several television appearances poking fun at herself. This includes appearances on the CBC television comedy This Hour Has 22 Minutes and a skate on the Rideau Canal with Rick Mercer for his series Rick Mercer Report. She also played a political reporter in the television mini-series H_{2}O:The Last Prime Minister. In November 2005, she appeared on an episode of This Hour Has 22 Minutes. At one point in the show, she remarked "You know, I recommended to Stephen [Harper] once that to rise in his polls he should take a little Viagra but the pill got stuck in his throat and all he got was a stiff neck."

==== Liberal Party ====
Although the Liberals lost the 2006 federal election, Stronach won re-election as a Liberal candidate by a greater margin than she had in the 2004 election as a Conservative.

Following the Liberals' defeat in the 2006 election, Paul Martin announced that he would be stepping down as party leader. It was widely speculated that Stronach would seek the Liberal leadership at the 2006 leadership convention, having been endorsed by such Liberals as Reg Alcock and Brigitte Legault, who was head of the Quebec party's youth wing.

However, on April 6, 2006, she announced that she would not seek the leadership, citing her objections to the delegate-based selection process. "I could have raised the money, I was working on my French, but I realized that I was not going to be free to speak my mind on party renewal", said Stronach. She said that renewal would involve giving all party members a direct vote on its direction and leadership, among other things. "If there was a one-member, one-vote system, I would run." However, a report by CTV reporter Robert Fife suggested that her candidacy was hampered by her weak grasp of French, one of Canada's two official languages, and the fact that she believed the Liberals would be defeated in the next election. Several Liberal Party officials had also warned that they would enforce the new rules, which placed limits on donations and spending by contenders, which would have nullified Stronach's largest advantage over other potential rivals.

On April 11, 2007, Stronach announced that she would not seek re-election and would instead return to Magna International as executive vice-chairman. This decision came at a time when Magna was in the midst of teaming up with Onex Corporation to consider a bid to buy Chrysler. Stronach further cited her wish to spend more time with her growing children, and the creation of a personal foundation to end poverty and disease in Africa. She retained her seat in Parliament until the federal election in the fall of 2008.

== Personal life ==
Stronach is twice divorced. Her first husband was former Magna CEO Donald J. Walker, and her second was Norwegian speed skater Johann Olav Koss. She has two children from her first marriage, Frank and Nicole Walker. Frank Walker is a DJ and producer. Nicole Walker is a champion equestrian, currently ranked 5th in Canada. Her personal life has received heavy coverage, including her relationships with Tie Domi and Peter MacKay. She is a family friend of former U.S. president Bill Clinton.

=== Cancer diagnosis ===
In April 2007, Stronach was diagnosed with ductal carcinoma in situ, a form of breast cancer. She shared with the press that she had undergone a mastectomy on June 19 in an undisclosed Toronto hospital.

Stronach travelled to California for a mastectomy and reconstruction surgery in June 2007 because the type of surgery was unavailable at the time in Canada. Following her experience, Stronach raised over a million dollars for the Belinda Stronach chair in Breast Cancer Reconstructive Surgery at the University of Toronto.

== Publication ==
- Stronach, Belinda; zu Guttenberg, Karl-Theodor (July 14, 2014). "Breathe deep. EU trade is oxygen". The Globe and Mail.

27th Canadian Ministry (2003–2006) – Cabinet of Paul Martin
Cabinet posts (2)
Predecessor	Office	Successor
Legislation enacted	Minister of Human Resources and Skills Development; 2005–2006	Diane Finley
Lucienne Robillard	Minister of State; 2005 styled as Minister of Human Resources and Skills Development	Legislation enacted
Special Cabinet Responsibilities
Predecessor	Title	Successor
Position created – replacing Minister responsible for Democratic Reform Mauril Bélanger	Minister responsible for Democratic Renewal; 2005–2006	Position abolished – see Rob Nicholson
