= Youth Employment Services (Canada) =

Canadian not-for-profit organization

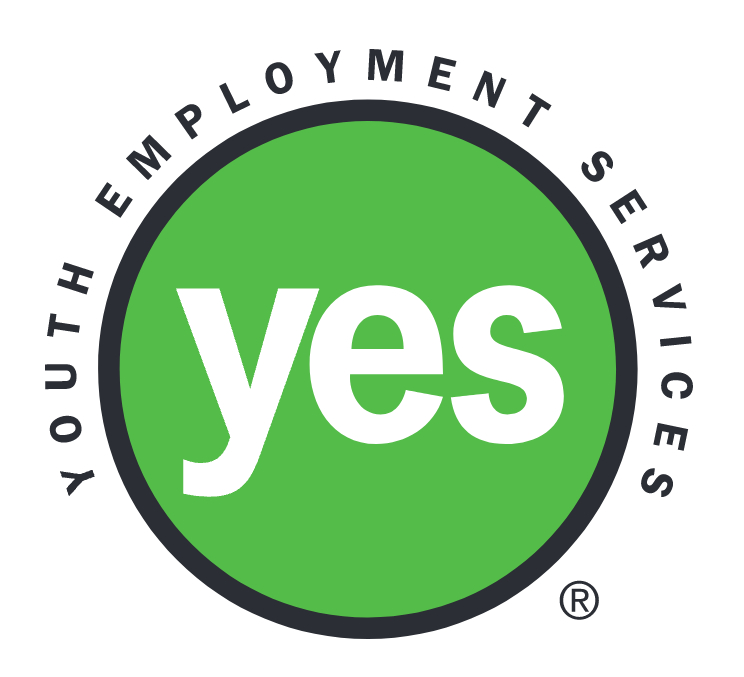
- Type: Not-for-profit organization
- Industry: Employment
- Founded: 1968
- Headquarters: Toronto, Canada
- Key people: Timothy O. E. Lang, President & Chief Executive Officer – YES
- Website: yes.on.ca

Youth Employment Services YES (also known as YES) is a Canadian not-for-profit organization established in 1968 with the objective of providing employment services to young people. YES is primarily funded by the Government of Canada, the Province of Ontario, and various other organizations and foundations.

== History ==
The Youth Employment Services (YES) was established in the late 1960s in Toronto. The founding of the organization is associated with employment in Canada.

In 1998, YES opened Canada's first Youth Business Centre to provide young entrepreneurs with individual business skills training and help them secure start-up loans.

In 2016, under Timothy O. E. Lang's lead, YES together with minister of youth Justin Trudeau announced a doubling of funding for the Canada Summer Jobs program, which will provide opportunities for an additional 34,000 youths. This means an increased funding of $113 million annually for the next three years. Previously, the program received $106 million, supporting over 34,000 summer jobs.

In 2019, YES has developed a specialized mental health curriculum thanks to the Counseling Foundation and with support from Citibank Foundation to create YES-On-Demand (YOD).

In April 2021, Youth Employment and Skills Strategy Program and Canada Emergency Response Benefit (CERB) provided financial assistance to young people during the pandemic.

In July 2021, YES reported in its research that youth employment for ages 15 to 24 increased by over seven percent, but this surge, influenced by summer job-seeking and pandemic recoveries, may be short-lived as many return to school in the fall.

In May 2022, the Canadian agency Youth Employment Services (YES) introduced a cybersecurity course for disadvantaged youth aged 15 to 29. The program was developed in partnership with IBM and received funding from the Government of Ontario's Skills Development Fund.

The range of services offered by YES programming related to IT, entrepreneurship, trades, apprenticeship and empowerment, employment assessment and professional counseling, pre-employment training, job placement, job retention and training, future skills’ development, mental health and entrepreneurial programming, financial literacy, mentorship, cloud computing training, and workforce development. Also, youth in the region can participate in YES' online programming.
