= Landmark East School =

Coordinates: 45.087151°N 64.379442°W

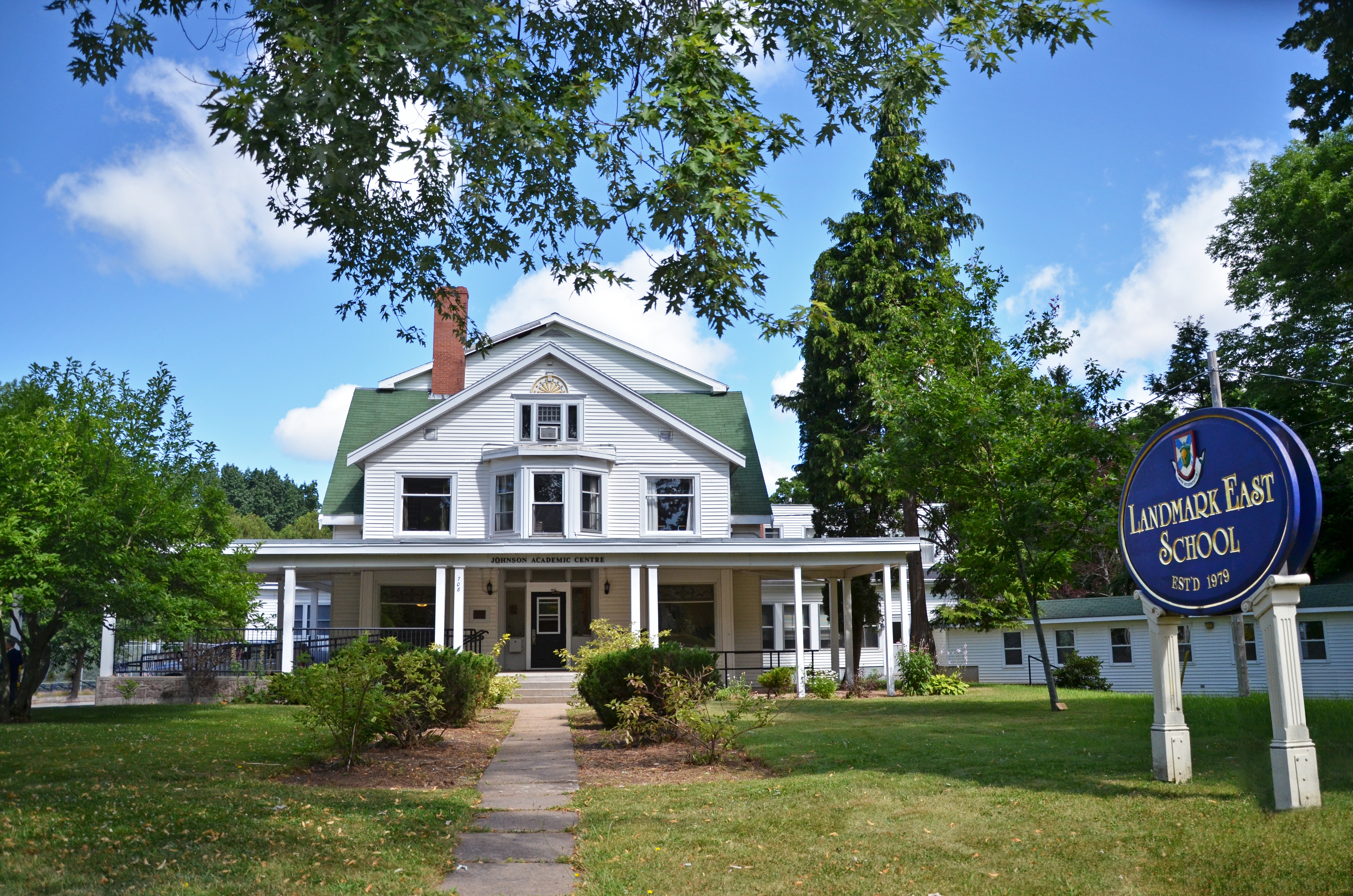

Location
- 708 Main Street; Wolfville, Nova Scotia, B4P 1G4; Canada

Information
- School type: Independent
- Motto: Engaging Minds and Changing Lives
- Established: 1979
- Founder: Dr. Charles Drake Dr. William F. Mason
- Head of School: Karen Fougere
- Staff: ~49
- Grades: 2-12
- Enrollment: 71
- Website: www.landmarkeast.org

Landmark East is a non-profit independent boarding and day school located in Wolfville, Nova Scotia, Canada for students from around the world with language and learning disabilities including dyslexia, ADHD, and non-verbal learning.

== Campus ==
The main building is the Johnson Academic Centre, named in recognition of the support of the Theodore R. & Vivian M. Johnson Scholarship Foundation. The Centre contains classrooms, labs, administrative offices, dining hall, kitchen, and conference room. It was originally a home owned by Roy A. Jodrey, and later became the Paramount Hotel in 1942.

Other buildings on campus contain the boys' and girls' dormitories, additional learning spaces, student common areas, and multiple exercise facilities.

== Programs ==
Landmark East School provides academic programming for Grades 3-12 for students with varying forms of learning differences. The Elementary Program (Grades 3–6) focuses mainly on developing literacy skills and features one-on-one daily support for students. The Middle School Program (Grades 7–9) focuses on literacy and numeracy skills and features daily support for learning strategies. The High School Program (Grades 10–12) awards a Nova Scotia Department of Education High School Graduation Diploma upon completion. Students have their choice of academic courses and gain the skills and confidence necessary to pursue their goals after graduation. Over 85% of Landmark East graduates attend post-secondary institutions like university or college. Landmark East students attend an academically supported study hall each day. Students may apply for enrolment for any grade at any time of year.

== Boarding ==
Boarding is available to students in Grades 7–12. There are separate buildings for boys’ and girls’ dormitories and boarding students are provided with all of their meals in the dining hall. Boarding students have access to a variety of daily organized activities, including on weekends, throughout the campus and community.
