= Wolfville =

- Town
- Aerial view of downtown, 2026

- Flag Coat of arms

- Location of Wolfville, Nova Scotia
- Coordinates: 45°5′0″N 64°22′0″W
- Country: Canada
- Province: Nova Scotia
- County: Kings County
- Settled: 1755
- Incorporated: March 4, 1893

Government
  - Mayor: Jodi MacKay
  - MLA: Julie Vanexan (PC)
  - MP: Kody Blois (L)

Area
  - Land: 6.46 km^{2} (2.49 sq mi)
- Highest elevation: 92 m (302 ft)
- Lowest elevation: 0 m (0 ft)

Population (2021)
  - Total: 5,057
  - Density: 783.3/km^{2} (2,029/sq mi)
  - Change (2016–21): ▲20.5
- Time zone: UTC-4 (AST)
  - Summer (DST): UTC-3 (ADT)
- Postal code: B4P
- Area code: 902
- Telephone Exchange: 542, 585, 697
- Median Earnings*: $58,400
- NTS Map: 21H1 Wolfville
- GNBC Code: CBROD
- Website: wolfville.ca
- *Median household income, 2020

Wolfville is a Canadian town in the Annapolis Valley, Kings County, Nova Scotia, located about 100 kilometres (62 mi) northwest of the provincial capital, Halifax. The town is home to Acadia University and Landmark East School.

The town is a tourist destination due to its views of Cape Blomidon, the Bay of Fundy and Gaspereau Valley, as well as its wine industry. The downtown portion of Wolfville is home to pubs, bars, cafes and shops. Wolfville is also home to the Acadia Cinema Cooperative, a non-profit organization that runs the local movie/performance house. In the past few years, several Victorian houses in Wolfville have been converted to bed and breakfast establishments.

== History ==
French settlement in the Wolfville area began in about 1680, when Pierre Melanson established his family at Grand-Pré. The Acadians prospered as farmers by enclosing the estuarine salt marshes with dykes, and successfully converting the reclaimed lands into fertile fields for crops and pasturage. In 1710, however, Acadia was lost by the French crown after the English laid siege to Annapolis Royal. Under the 1713 Peace of Utrecht, signed at the close of the War of the Spanish Succession, Acadia was ceded for the final time to the British.

For the next 36 years, until the establishment of Halifax in 1749, the British remained at Annapolis Royal and Canso. The French-speaking Catholic population grew over the intervening years to well over 10,000 and the Minas region (Wolfville and environs) quickly became the principal settlement. Acadia was a borderland region between the British and French empires, and this caused a complex socio-political environment to develop for the Acadians. Both the British and the French coaxed and threatened the Acadians in attempts to secure their loyalty, as is evidenced by the various oaths of allegiance each side attempted to extract from them. This complex situation led many Acadians to attempt to maintain a neutral path; while others openly supported either the French or the British. During the War of the Austrian Succession, the Acadians in the Wolfville area were implicated in the Battle of Grand Pré, during which a French military force, reinforced by Mi'kmaq and Acadian allies, defeated a British force.

After the outbreak of the Seven Years' War between Great Britain and France, the Acadians in the Wolfville area, along with all Acadians in peninsular Nova Scotia, were involved in the deportations which took place as part of the expulsion of the Acadians (see also the Bay of Fundy Campaign). Beginning in September 1755 and continuing into the fall, approximately 2,000 Acadians were deported by the British from the area around Wolfville. The villages lying beyond Grand-Pré were burned by British forces, and still more buildings were destroyed by both sides during the guerrilla war that took place until 1758.

=== British rule ===
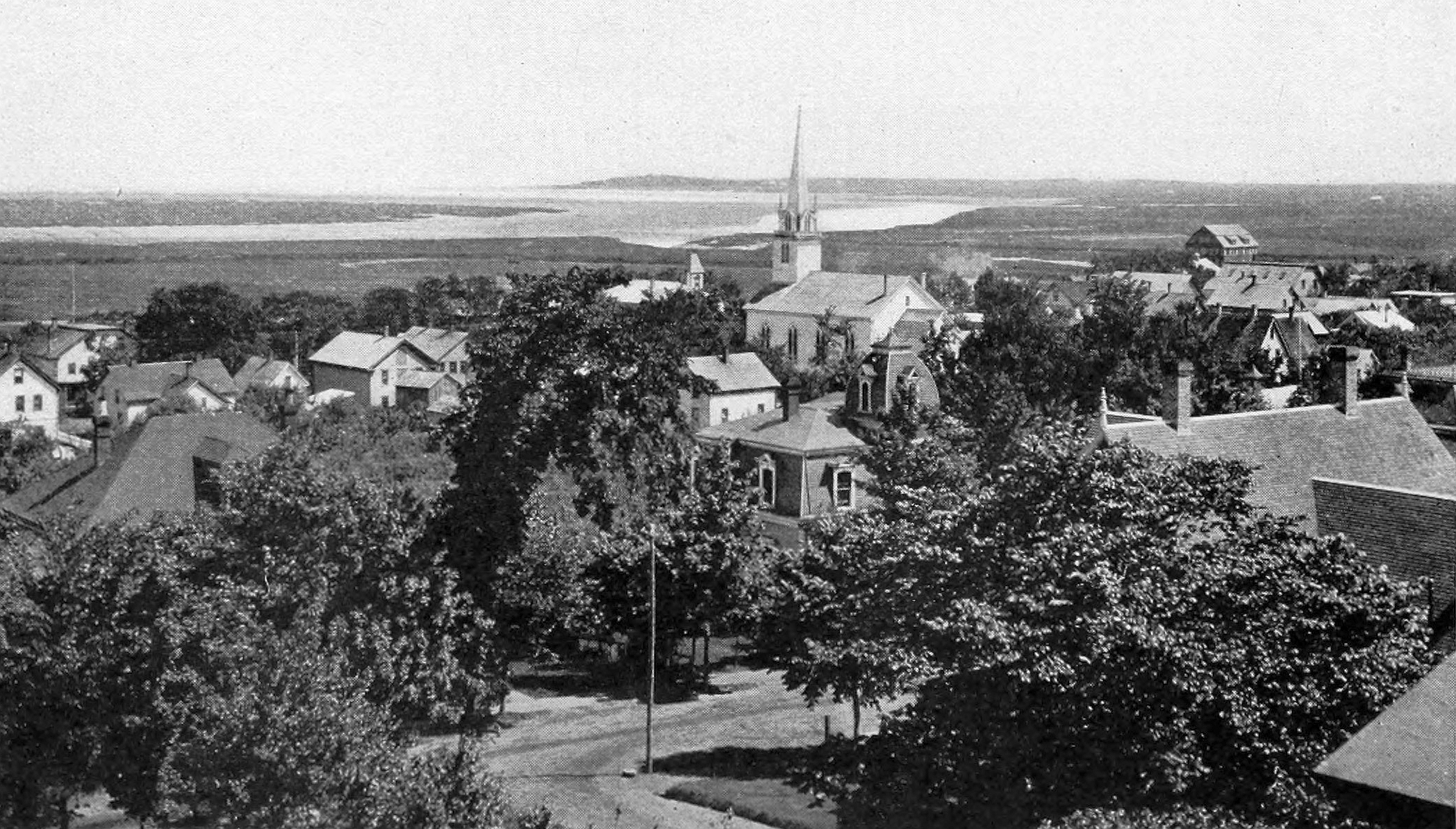
Wolfville, 1897

In around 1760, the British authorities in Nova Scotia made several township plots of land available in the Annapolis Valley for colonization by English-speaking settlers. Horton Township was created in the Grand-Pré/Wolfville Area. Because of pressure on agricultural lands in New England, Anglophone farmers moved north in search of fertile land at a reasonable price. It is thought that between 1760 and 1789, more than 8,000 people known as New England Planters immigrated to the land around the Annapolis Valley. In 1763, there were 154 families living in the area of Horton Township.

The New England Planters set up a primarily agricultural economy, exporting cattle, potatoes, and grain, and later apples, as well as developing lumbering and shipbuilding. They settled and re-used the same dyke-lands as the Acadians had used before them, repairing and later expanding the agricultural dykes. They developed a major expansion in 1808, the three-mile-long Wickwire Dyke, which connected the Wolfville and Grand Pre dykes. This allowed the agricultural development of an additional 8,000 acres. The town site for Horton was initially surveyed in the Grand-Pré area at Horton Landing near the mouth of the Gaspereau River. However, the town developed around the sheltered harbour on the Cornwallis River at Wolfville, at first known as Mud Creek.

The first official record of a Baptist church in Canada was that of the Horton Baptist Church (now Wolfville), established on October 29, 1778. The church was established with the assistance of the New Light evangelist Henry Alline. The Baptist movement remained strong in the area. In 1838 Acadia University was founded as a Baptist college.

In 1830, the town of Mud Creek changed its name to Wolfville, in honour of Elisha DeWolf, the town's postmaster at the time. In the mid-19th century, Wolfville was renowned as the world's smallest port. The town became part of Canada with Confederation in 1867.

=== Canada ===
The Windsor and Annapolis Railway arrived in 1868, later becoming the Dominion Atlantic Railway. Wolfville became a seaport devoted principally to the export of apples from the orchards of the fertile Annapolis Valley. Wolfville Harbour was also a terminus of the MV Kipawo ferry, the last of a long succession of ferries that connected Wolfville, Kingsport, and Parrsboro for 200 years. The harbour, which empties twice a day due to the high tides of the Bay of Fundy, was once described by Robert Ripley as the smallest in the world. On March 20, 1893, the Town was incorporated, with E. Perry Bowles elected as its first mayor.

In 1985, the town was declared a nuclear free zone. Wolfville was declared Canada's first fair trade town on April 17, 2007. In May 2016, Wolfville was designated as the third Cittaslow in Canada.

== Demographics ==
Historical population
Year	Pop.	±%
1956	2,497	—
1961	2,413	−3.4%
1981	3,235	+34.1%
1986	3,277	+1.3%
1991	3,475	+6.0%
1996	3,833	+10.3%
2001	3,658	−4.6%
2006	3,772	+3.1%
2011	4,269	+13.2%
2016	4,195	−1.7%
2021	5,057	+20.5%

In the 2021 Census of Population conducted by Statistics Canada, Wolfville had a population of 5,057 living in 2,441 of its 2,856 total private dwellings, a change of 20.5% from its 2016 population of 4,195. With a land area of 6.46 km^{2} (2.49 sq mi), it had a population density of 782.8/km^{2} (2,027.5/sq mi) in 2021.

With Acadia University having a full time student population of 3,765, the population can fluctuate greatly with the school semesters.

== Arts and culture ==
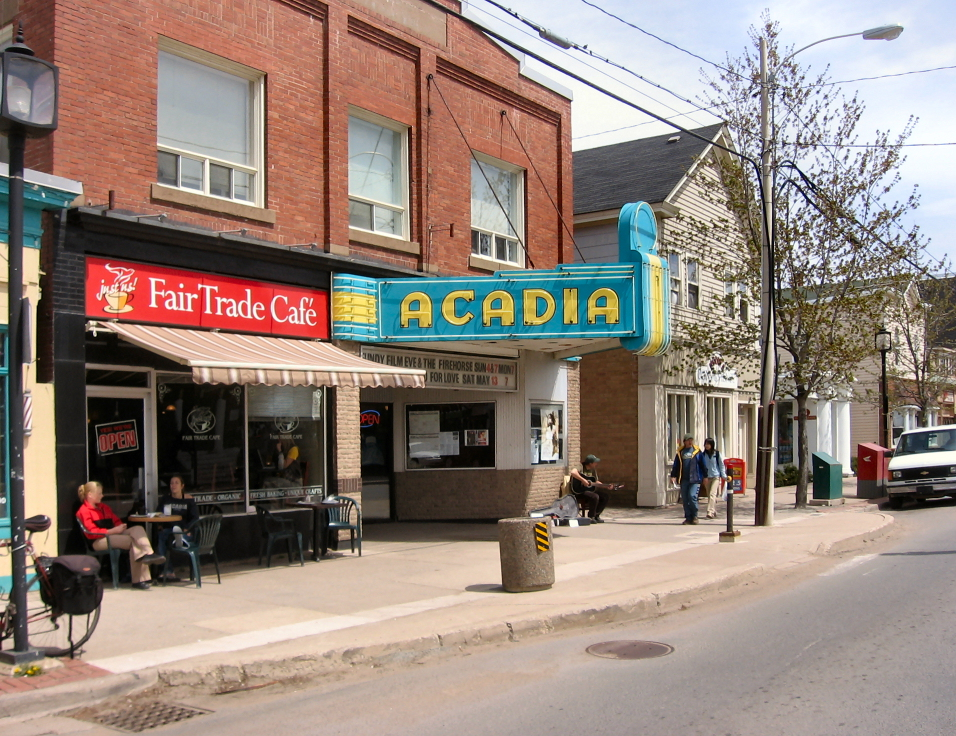
Wolfville streetscape, spring 2006. The view shows the Al Whittle (Acadia) Theatre, a house of movies and live performances now operated by a non-profit cooperative.

The Acadia University Art Gallery and The Festival Theatre are both located on Main Street, along with many bistros and boutiques. The town's history is presented at the Randall House Museum, operated by the Wolfville Historical Society. Each year, the Annapolis Valley Music Festival is held at Acadia Campus, where musicians from across the valley compete. Wolfville hosts two annual arts festivals, the Deep Roots Music Festival in September and Devour! The Food Film Fest in late October.

The Al Whittle Theatre operated by the Acadia Cinema Cooperative has for generations served as a nexus of culture and entertainment for the town's populace. Opened in 1911 and operating as an opera house until 1923 when it became a community theater and cinema, the theater underwent various changes in ownership until 1997 under the management of Acadia Cinems. With the retirement of its long-serving manager Al Whittle (1929–2021), the theater closed in 2000. In 2004, the theater was re-opened by the Acadia Cinema Cooperative Ltd. and named in honour of Al Whittle. The theater has continued to serve as a local gathering place and centre for the arts ever since, from hosting local theater productions to screening international independent films.

Wolfville has a farmers market located in the DeWolfe building, a former apple packing warehouse. In July 2022, the town hosted the first Annapolis Valley Pride Festival.

It has a library called Wolfville Memorial Library.

== Education ==
- Acadia University
- Landmark East School
- Wolfville School
- Horton High School

== Notable people ==
- Avi Adam, professional ice hockey player
- Joseph Barss, privateer
- Bob Chambers (1905–1996), political cartoonist
- Alex Colville (1920–2013) WWII artist
- Gilbert Lafayette Foster, 6th Canadian Surgeon General
- William Hall (1827–1904), third Canadian to receive the Victoria Cross.
- Benjamin Jackson, sailor and American Civil War veteran
- Arthur Chute McGill (1926–1980) theologian and philosopher
- Eddy (M) Melanson was born in Wolfville, Nova Scotia, on July 25, 1938.
- Mona Louise Parsons (1901–1976) member of the Dutch resistance, WW2

== Parks ==
- Canada Parks
- Lumsden Pond Provincial Park
- Reservoir Park
- Rotary Park
- Willow Park

== See also ==
- List of municipalities in Nova Scotia
