= It Seems Like Yesterday =

- Starring: Rick Mercer
- Country of origin: Canada

Production
- Running time: 30 minutes

Original release
- Network: History Television
- Release: 1998 – 2001

It Seems Like Yesterday was a Canadian half-hour television documentary series hosted by Rick Mercer on History Television. The series focussed on news, fashion, television, motion pictures, music, trends, fads and other areas of culture from the 1950s to the early 1980s, often with humorous commentary from Rick Mercer.

The show aired between 1998 and 2001.
