= List of Old Brightonians =

This is a List of Old Brightonians, notable former students – known as "Old Brightonians" – of the co-educational, public school, Brighton College in Brighton, East Sussex, United Kingdom.

== Academia, education and literature ==
- Edward Carpenter (1844–1929), socialist writer and campaigner for homosexual rights
- Robert H. Crabtree (born 1948), Organometallic Chemist, Professor of Inorganic Chemistry, Yale University, creator of Crabtree's catalyst
- Andrew Gamble (born 1947), Professor of Politics, University of Sheffield and then University of Cambridge, Fellow of the British Academy
- Francis Llewellyn Griffith (1862–1934), Egyptologist and pioneer of Nubian archaeology, first Professor of Egyptology, University of Oxford
- George Bagshawe Harrison (1894–1991), Shakespearean scholar, Professor of English, Queen's University, Ontario and the University of Michigan, editor of the Penguin Shakespeare 1937–59, member of the Roman Catholic International Commission on English in the Liturgy
- C. L. James (1846–1911), anarchist writer and journalist
- Sir Richard Jolly (born 1934), development economist, Assistant Secretary-General United Nations, Director Institute of Development Studies at the University of Sussex 1972–81
- Ewart Mackintosh (1893–1917), First World War poet, MC
- Michael Roberts (1908–1996), historian of Sweden, Professor of History at Queen's University Belfast, Fellow of the British Academy
- Sir Sydney Roberts (1887–1966), Dr Johnson scholar, Master of Pembroke College, Cambridge, Secretary of Cambridge University Press and Vice-Chancellor of the University of Cambridge, Chairman British Film Institute
- John Alfred Ryle (1889–1950), physician and Regius Professor of Physic, University of Cambridge 1935–45, physician to King George V
- Gilbert Ryle (1900–1976), philosopher and Waynflete Professor of Metaphysical Philosophy, University of Oxford, declined a knighthood in 1965
- Ian Serraillier (1912–1994), novelist, children's writer and poet
- Robert Skidelsky, Baron Skidelsky of Tilton (born 1939), Professor of Political Economy, University of Warwick, created a life peer (changed whip from SDP to Conservative to cross-bencher)
- Leonard Strong (1896–1958), writer and poet, Director of Methuen Ltd

== Architecture, building and engineering ==
- Sir Francis Fox (1844–1927), civil engineer, responsible for Mersey Railway Tunnel and the Snowdon Mountain Railway, consultant engineer for the Simplon Tunnel, consultant engineer in the restoration of Exeter Cathedral, Lincoln Cathedral, Peterborough Cathedral, St Paul's Cathedral and Winchester Cathedral
- Charles Fraser-Smith (1904–1992), missionary, farmer, creator of gadgets for SOE during World War II and as such the model for Q in Ian Fleming's James Bond stories
- Sir Thomas Graham Jackson (1835–1924), architect and architectural historian, Master of the Art Workers' Guild 1896, RA

== Business ==
- Sir Hugo Cunliffe-Owen (1870–1947), civil engineer, Chairman of British American Tobacco
- Cuthbert Heath (1859–1939), insurance pioneer at Lloyd's of London
- Sir Arthur Pease, Bt. (1866–1927), coal magnate, Second Civil Lord of the Admiralty
- David Quayle (1936–2010), co-founder of B&Q
- Sir George Reeves-Smith (1863–1941), managing director of the Savoy Company

== Community and philanthropy ==
- Frederick Nicholas Charrington (1850–1936), Temperance worker and social reformer
- Mervyn Cowie (1909–1996), conservationist, founding Director of the Kenya National Park Service
- Alsager Hay Hill (1839–1906), social reformer on poor law and unemployment issues
- Ken Stevens (1922–2005), chief executive The Scout Association

== Entertainment, media and the arts ==
- John Castle (born 1940), actor
- Dave Clarke (born c.1969), techno producer and disc jockey
- Tom Conway (1904–1967), actor
- Peter Copley (born 1962), composer and cellist
- Roland Curram (born c.1932) actor and novelist
- Wilfrid de Glehn (1870–1951), impressionist painter, RA
- Simon Dee (1935–2009) (real name Cyril Henty-Dodd), radio disk jockey and television presenter, Sixties celebrity and inspiration for Austin Powers
- Rose Elinor Dougall (born 1986), musician, former member of The Pipettes
- Rotimi Fani-Kayode, photographer
- Tim Hadcock-Mackay, TV shows presenter
- Christopher Hassall (1912–1963), writer and librettist
- Tony Hawks (born c.1960), comedian and author
- Gavin Henderson (born c.1947), Principal of Trinity College of Music and Chairman of Youth Music
- McDonald Hobley (1917–1987), actor, TV and radio presenter, TV Personality of the Year 1954
- Sir Michael Hordern (1911–1995), actor
- Menhaj Huda (born 1967), film producer and director
- Selwyn Image (1849–1930), designer, illustrator and poet, joint founder of the Century Guild, Master of the Art Workers' Guild 1900, Slade Professor at Oxford 1910 and 1913
- Bruce Lester (1912–2008), actor
- Miles Malleson (1888–1969), actor, playwright and scriptwriter
- Peter Mayle (1939–2018), writer. He has written that he loathed the school.
- Tamzin Merchant (born 1987), actress
- Leonard Merrick (1864–1939), writer
- Ward Muir (1878–1927), photographer
- David Nash (born 1945), sculptor, RA
- Laurie Penny (1986–present), journalist
- Sir Edward Poynter (1836–1919), painter, art educator and President of the Royal Academy
- George Sanders (1906–1972), actor. Won Academy Award for Best Supporting Actor 1950. He said in his biography that he hated the school.
- Bijan Sheibani (born 1979), award-winning theatre director
- Chris Terrill (born 1952) Anthropologist, adventurer and multi award-winning documentary maker including Royal Television Society award for Innovation for Soho Stories (1997), Emmy for Ape Trade (1992)
- John Warner (1924–2001), actor
- John Worsley (1919–2000), artist and illustrator, World War II official war artist and creator of Albert RN, President Royal Society of Marine Artists
- Vera Filatova (born 1982), Actress
- Dakota Blue Richards (born 1994), Actress
- Chloé Zhao (born 1982), filmmaker, won Academy Award for Best Director 2021

== Medicine and science ==
- Leslie Collier (1920–2011), virologist, Director of the Lister Institute laboratories, Professor of Virology at the University of London 1966–88
- Sir Ronald Hatton (1886–1965), horticulturist, Fellow of the Royal Society
- John Alfred Ryle (1889–1950), physician and Regius Professor of Physic, University of Cambridge 1935–45, physician to King George V
- Sir George Savage (1842–1921), psychiatrist

== Military ==
- Lieutenant-Colonel Leonard Berney (1920–2016), Bergen-Belsen concentration camp liberator
- Alfred Carpenter (1847–1925), naval officer, commander Marine Survey of India, piloted the Burma Field Force up the River Irrawaddy in 1885 (awarded DSO), Albert Medal (Challenger Scientific Expedition)
- Air Commodore Lionel Charlton (1879–1958), Royal Flying Corps and Royal Air Force officer, Air Attache Washington 1919–22, as Chief Air Staff Officer Iraq Command in 1924 he resigned in protest at the policy of policing by bombing civilian targets, in retirement a successful author of children's fiction, wrote a series of influential books on air defence 1935–38
- Brigadier-General Frank Crozier (1879–1937), commander of the British Mission to Lithuania, 1919–20, commander of the Black and Tans, 1920–21, military author and co-founder of the Peace Pledge Union
- Air Marshal Sir Humphrey Edwardes Jones (1905–1987), inaugural Commander-in-Chief, RAF Germany
- Colonel Sir George Malcolm Fox (1843–1918), Inspector of Gymnasia and sword designer
- Admiral Sir Herbert Heath (1861–1954), Rear-Admiral Commanding 2nd Cruiser Squadron at Jutland in 1916, Second Sea Lord
- General Sir William Peyton (1866–1931), commanded Western Frontier Force against the Senussi 1916, Military Secretary to Sir Douglas Haig 1916–18, commanded 40th Infantry Division July 1918 – March 1919 in France and Flanders, Military Secretary to Secretary of State for War 1922–26, Commander-in-Chief Scottish Command 1926–30
- General Sir Harry Prendergast (1834–1913), Victoria Cross, Indian Army soldier, commander of the Burma Field Force 1885–86
- Major-General Sir Herbert Stewart (1843–1885), army staff officer, commanded the Desert Column to relieve Khartoum, mortally wounded at Abu Klea
- General Sir Cecil Sugden (1903–1963), Quartermaster-General to the Forces and Master-General of the Ordnance
- Lieutenant-General Sir Francis Tuker (1894–1967), Indian Army officer and military historian, commander 4th Indian Division, 1941–44

== Politics, public service and the law ==
- Robert Alexander, Baron Alexander of Weedon (1936–2005), barrister, banker, politician and Chancellor of the University of Exeter
- Sir Edmund Barnard (1856–1930), Chairman of the Metropolitan Water Board, Chairman of Hertfordshire County Council, Liberal MP for Kidderminster, Cambridge polo blue
- Sir Max Bemrose (1904–1986), Chairman of Bemrose Corporation, Chairman National Union of Conservative and Unionist Associations, High Sheriff of Derbyshire
- Keith Best (born 1949), lawyer and politician, Conservative MP for Anglesey and Ynys Mon 1979–87 (resigned and prosecuted for fraud), Director Prisoners Abroad 1989–93, chief executive Immigration Advisory Service, Chairman Conservative Action for Electoral Reform, Chairman of the Executive Committee World Federalist Movement
- Andrew Cayley CMG KC (born 1964), barrister specialising in international criminal law, public international law and international arbitration. Formerly Senior Prosecuting Counsel and Principal Trial Counsel at the ICTY and ICC. The UN’s International Chief Co-Prosecutor of the Khmer Rouge Tribunal in Cambodia from 2009 to 2013. The United Kingdom's Director of Service Prosecutions from 2013 to 2020 and His Majesty’s Chief Inspector of the Crown Prosecution Service from 2021 to 2024.
- Sir John Chilcot (1939–2021), Permanent Under-Secretary of State, Northern Ireland Office, 1990–97
- Sir Henry John Stedman Cotton (1845–1915), Indian civil servant, Chief Commissioner of Assam, President of the Indian National Congress and Liberal MP for Nottingham East 1906–10
- Eric Gandar Dower (1894–1987), air pioneer and Conservative MP for Caithness and Sutherland 1945–50
- William Fuller-Maitland (1844–1932), cricketer and politician, Oxford blue, played for the MCC, the Gentlemen, I Zingari and Essex, Liberal MP for Breconshire 1875–95
- Alan Green (1911–1991), Conservative MP for Preston South 1955–64 and 1970–74, Financial Secretary to the Treasury 1963–64
- Sir Thomas Erskine Holland (1835–1926), Chichele Professor of International Law and Diplomacy, University of Oxford and legal historian
- Francis Hughes-Hallett (1838–1903), soldier and politician, Colonel Royal Artillery, Conservative MP for Rochester 1885–89 (resigned in a sex scandal)
- Sir Clement Kinloch-Cooke (1854–1944), barrister and politician, MP Devonport (Conservative) 1910–23 and Cardiff East (Unionist) 1924–29, created baronet
- Augustus Margary (1846–1875), Chinese Consular Service officer and explorer in China
- Sir Hubert Murray (1861–1940), Lieutenant-Governor of Papua New Guinea
- Denzil Roberts Onslow (1839–1908), Conservative MP for Guildford 1874–85, played cricket for Cambridge University, Sussex and the MCC
- Herbert Pike Pease, 1st Baron Daryngton (1867–1949), Liberal Unionist and then Unionist MP for Darlington, Assistant Postmaster-General, Privy Councillor and Ecclesiastical Commissioner
- Charles Campbell Ross (1849–1920), banker and politician, Conservative MP for St Ives 1881–85
- Sir Walter Shaw (1863–1937), judge, Chief Justice of the Straits Settlements
- Arthur Wellesley Soames (1852–1934), Liberal MP for South Norfolk 1898–1918, son of the Brighton College founder William Aldwin Soames
- George Hampden Whalley (1851–1917), Liberal MP for Peterborough 1880–83 resigned and declared bankrupt, imprisoned for theft, emigrated to Australia, and vanished

== Religion ==
- Timothy Bavin (born 1935), Anglican priest and Benedictine monk, Bishop of Johannesburg and then Portsmouth
- John Neville Figgis (1866–1919), Anglican priest, member of the Community of the Resurrection, church historian, theologian and political theorist
- Cecil Horsley (1906–1953), Anglican priest, Bishop of Colombo 1938–47 and then Gibraltar 1947–53
- Wilfrid John Hudson (1904–1981), Anglican priest, Bishop of Carpentaria 1950–60 and then coadjutor Bishop of Brisbane 1960–73
- Frederick Meyer (1847–1929), Baptist minister and evangelist, social reformer, President of the Baptist Union, dubbed "archbishop of the free churches"
- Arthur Stretton Reeve (1907–1981), Cambridge rowing blue (1930) and Anglican priest, Bishop of Lichfield 1953–74

== Sport ==
- Gordon Belcher (1885–1915), cricketer (son of Thomas Belcher, headmaster of the college)
- Tom Campbell Black (1899–1936), aviator, joint winner London-Melbourne Centenary Air Race 1934, awarded Britannia Trophy 1934
- William Churchill (1840–1907), cricketer
- Holly Colvin (born 1989), England cricketer
- Maurice Conde-Williams (1885–1967), naval officer and cricketer, played for the Royal Navy and Devon
- George Huth Cotterill (1868–1950), England footballer, Corinthian 1886–98, Cambridge football blue 1888–91, played cricket for Sussex 1886–90
- Clare Connor (born 1976), England cricket captain
- John Cressy-Hall (1843–1894), cricketer
- Freya Davies (born 1995), England cricketer
- Robert Dewing (1863–1934), cricketer
- Chris Eubank Jnr (born 1989) Professional boxer
- Harry Freeman (1887–1926), cricketer
- Joe Gatting (born 1987), former footballer for Brighton and Hove Albion, cricketer for Sussex
- Leslie Gay (1871–1949), England footballer, England cricketer 1894–95, Cambridge blue, Hampshire and Somerset
- Leslie Godfree (?–?), tennis player, won Men's Doubles at Wimbledon 1923 and Mixed Doubles 1926 (finalist 1924 and 1927)
- Chris Grammer (born 1984), cricketer
- Sam Grant (born 1995), cricketer
- Duncan Hamilton (1920–1994), racing driver
- John Hart (born 1982), Wasps rugby union player
- Geoffrey Hett, (1909–88), fencer, Captain Cambridge University Fencing 1930, British Foil Team 1936 Olympics, author of a standard work on Fencing
- Carl Hopkinson (born 1981), cricketer
- Bazid Khan (born 1981), Pakistan cricketer
- Alex King (born 1975), England and Wasps rugby union player
- Richard Kirwan (1829–1872), cricketer
- Dan Lategan (born 2006), cricketer
- 'Hopper' Levett (1908–1995), England, Kent and MCC cricketer (wicket-keeper)
- Gordon Lyon (1905–1932), cricketer
- Matt Machan (born 1991), Sussex cricketer
- Laura Marsh (born 1986), England cricketer
- Ralph Oliphant-Callum (born 1971), played first-class cricket for Oxford University
- Denzil Roberts Onslow (1839–1908), played cricket for Cambridge University, Sussex and MCC, Conservative MP for Guildford 1874–85
- Jonathan Palmer (born 1956), racing driver
- Ollie Phillips (born 1982), England and Newcastle Falcons rugby union player
- Matt Prior (born 1982), England cricketer
- Malcolm Waller (born 1984) Zimbabwe Cricket player
- George Colin Ratsey (1906–1984), sailmaker and sailor, silver medal 2-man Star class 1932 Olympics, Prince of Wales Cup winner (14 ft dinghies) 1939, Prince Philip Cup winner (Dragon class) 1959, in the crew for two British attempts at the America's Cup 1934 and 1958
- Major Ritchie (1870–1955), tennis player, gold medal men's singles 1906 Olympics, silver medal men's doubles 1906 Olympics, bronze medal men's indoor singles 1906 Olympics, Wimbledon doubles champion 1906 and 1910, Irish singles champion 1907, German singles champion 1903–06 and 1910, British Davis Cup team 1910
- Henry Soames (1843–1913) Hampshire cricketer, son of the Brighton College founder William Aldwin Soames
- Kelvin Tatum (born 1964), British speedway captain
- Sarah Taylor (born 1989), England cricketer
- Claude Wilson (1858–1881), England footballer
- Sammy Woods (1867–1931), Somerset cricketer, played cricket for both Australia and England; and England rugby player and captain
- Jordan Turner-Hall (born 1988), England and Harlequins rugby union player
- Harry Leonard (born 1992), Scotland and Rosslyn Park professional rugby union player
- Ollie Richards (born 1992), England rugby union player
- Ross Chisholm (born 1990), Harlequins professional rugby union player
- James Chisholm (born 1995), Harlequins professional rugby union player
- Todd Gleave (born 1995), Gloucester Rugby professional rugby union player
- Charles Ward (1838–1892), cricketer
- Calum Waters (born 1996), Harlequins professional rugby union player
- Marcus Smith (born 1999), Harlequins professional rugby union player
- Leonard Stileman-Gibbard (1856–1939), cricketer

== Notable Brighton College staff ==
- Grant Allen (1848–1899), novelist, author of The Woman Who Did (1896)
- Thomas Belcher (1847–1919), cricketer and headmaster of Brighton College 1881–92
- Rt Rev. Christopher Butler (1902–1986), Benedictine monk, Abbot of Downside Abbey 1946–66, Council Father at the Second Vatican Council, Auxiliary Bishop of Westminster
- Bertie Corbett (1875–1967), played association football for Oxford, the Corinthians and England, played hockey for England, played cricket for Buckinghamshire and Derbyshire
- Rt Rev. Henry Cotterill, Vice-Principal of Brighton College 1846–51, Principal of Brighton College 1851–56, Bishop of Grahamston, South Africa 1856–71, Coadjutor Bishop of Edinburgh 1871–72, Bishop of Edinburgh 1872–86
- Jack Hindmarsh (1927–2009), Professor at Trinity College of Music
- Frank Harris (c. 1856–1931), notorious author, traveller, intriguer and fantasist
- Walter Ledermann, Professor of Mathematics at the University of Sussex 1965–78
- Professor George Long (1800–1879), classical scholar, inaugural Professor of Ancient Languages at the University of Virginia, inaugural Professor of Greek at University College London, Professor of Latin at University College London, co-founder and Honorary Secretary of the Royal Geographical Society
- Frederick Madden (1839–1904), numismatist, Secretary and Bursar of Brighton College 1874–88. Chief Librarian, Brighton Public Library 1888–1902
