= Westaway =

Westaway is a surname of English origin, denoting someone who lived on a road on the western side of a village. Notable people with the surname include:

- Alan Westaway (born 1969), British actor and screenwriter
- Alex Westaway (born 1983), British singer
- Col Westaway (1936–2015), Australian cricketer
- Greg Westaway, Australian businessman
- Jenna Westaway (born 1994), Canadian middle-distance runner
- Katharine Westaway (1893–1973), British classical scholar and headmistress
- Lewis Westaway (1821–1885), Canadian merchant, ship captain, ship owner and political figure
- Neil M. Westaway, Australian scout commissioner
- Nic Westaway (born 1989), Australian actor and singer
- Rachel Westaway, Australian politician
- Sam Westaway (born 1992), English cricketer
- Simon Westaway (born 1958), Australian actor
