= Marian Belcher =

English educator and school administrator

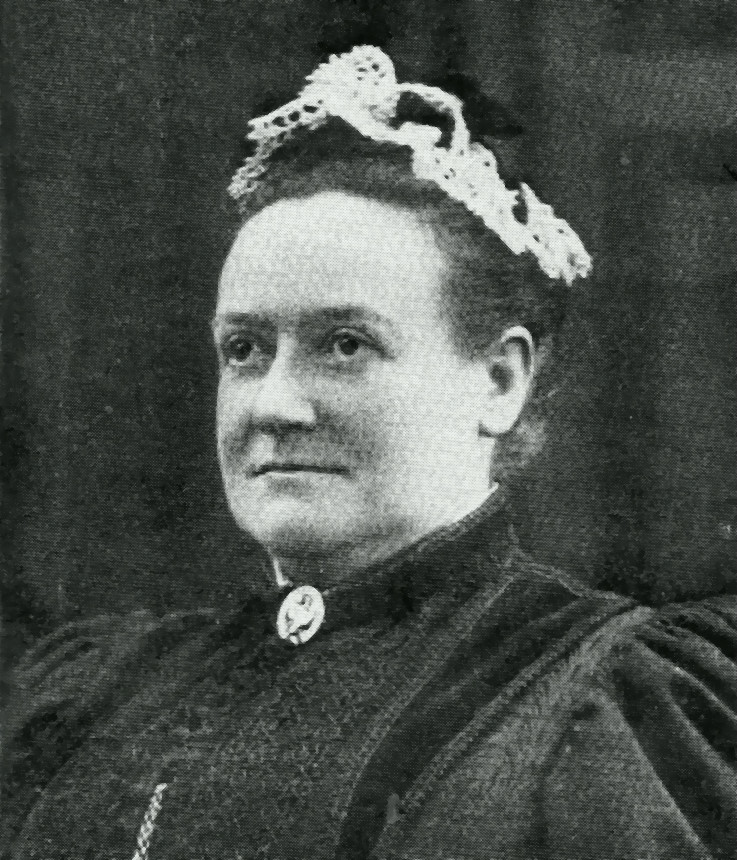
- Marian Belcher
- Born: 12 March 1849; Great Faringdon, Berkshire
- Died: 15 December 1898 (aged 49); Bedford
- Occupation: Educator
- Known for: Headmistress, Bedford High School (1883-1898)

Mary Anne "Marian" Belcher (12 March 1849 – 15 December 1898) was an English educator and school administrator, the second headmistress of Bedford High School.

== Early life ==
Mary Anne Belcher was born in Great Faringdon, Berkshire, the daughter of Thomas Belcher and Mary Anne Saunders Belcher. Her father was a grocer. Her brother Thomas Hayes Belcher was a noted cricketer who became principal of Brighton College. She was educated at Hillersdon House in Barnes, and at Cheltenham Ladies' College.

== Career ==
Belcher passed the General Examination for Women in 1870. She taught at Cheltenham Ladies' College from 1871 to 1883, and was the school's vice-principal from 1877, under the mentorship of headmistress Dorothea Beale.

In 1883, Belcher became headmistress of Bedford High School, after the founding headmistress, Ada Benson McDowall, died suddenly in the school's first year. "She it is, therefore, to whom the school chiefly owes its original organization and its present traditions," a 1906 report noted of Belcher. Under her administration, the school enrollment and facilities grew "with such marvelous rapidity", with new buildings to serve over 500 students, ages 7 through 20. Belcher's approach emphasised high moral purpose and set public service as a priority over private needs; "her rule was one of love, not of fear," recalled one account, "yet her sternness, where sternness was deserved, prevented any abuse of her gentle methods".

Belcher helped establish the high school's alumnae organization, the Old Girls' Guild, which held reunions and made charitable contributions in Bedford. She remained as headmistress at Bedford for fifteen years, until her death in 1898 from illness. She was succeeded by another Cheltenham-trained teacher, Susan Collie.

== Personal life ==
Belcher died in 1898, aged 49 years. She is buried at Foster Hill Road Cemetery in Bedford. The school established a Marian Belcher Leaving Scholarship in her memory in 1901, and a window in the school's chapel was dedicated to Belcher in 1902. Her nephew Gordon Belcher was a noted cricketer before he died in World War I.
