= Soames =

Soames or Somes is a surname. Notable people with the surname include:

- Abraham Somes (1732–1819), American soldier from Maine
- Arthur Granville Soames (1886–1962), English soldier, father of Christopher
- Arthur Wellesley Soames, (1852–1934), British politician and architect, son of William Aldwin
- A. Soames (fl. 1899–1902), South African cricket umpire
- Christopher Soames, Baron Soames (1920–1987), British politician and governor of Rhodesia
- Daniel E. Somes (1815–1888), American politician from Maine
- David Soames, (born 1984), English footballer
- Henry Soames (1843–1913), English cricketer, son of William Aldwin
- Henry Soames (historian) (1785–1860), English clergyman and ecclesiastical historian
- Jacqueline Soames (born 1968), British figure skater
- Jane Soames (1900–1988), British-born author, translator, and historian
- Joseph Somes (1787–1845), British shipowner and politician
- Joseph Somes (1819–1871), British politician
- Mary Soames, Baroness Soames (1922–2014), daughter of Winston Churchill, wife of Christopher
- Michael Somes (1917–1994), English ballet dancer
- Nicholas Soames (born 1948), British politician, son of Christopher
- Rupert Soames (born 1959), British businessman, son of Christopher
- Sally Soames (1937–2019), British newspaper photographer
- Scott Soames (born 1946), American philosopher
- Wendy Ellis Somes, British ballet producer and former ballerina
- William Aldwin Soames, founder of Brighton College, father of Arthur Wellesley, Henry and William
- William Soames (1850–1916), English cricketer, son of William Aldwin

== Fictional ==
- Captain Soames, police captain in 1992 horror movie Sleepwalkers
- Dudley Soames, the real name of the supervillain Torque of the DC Comics Nightwing
- "Enoch Soames", a short story by the British writer Max Beerbohm
- Hilton Soames, a character in The Adventure of the Three Students, a Sherlock Holmes story by Sir Arthur Conan Doyle
- John Soames, title character of The Mind of Mr. Soames, a 1970 British film
- Soames Forsyte, protagonist of The Forsyte Saga
- Tildie Soames, a mutant in the Marvel Universe
- Characters in the British soap opera Coronation Street:
  - Alison Soames, Kirsty Soames mother
  - Edwin Soames, Kirsty Soames' father
  - Kirsty Soames

== Places ==
- Somes Bar, California , an unincorporated community in Siskiyou County, California, United States
- Matiu / Somes Island, in Wellington Harbour, New Zealand
- Somes Sound, a body of water running deep into Mount Desert Island, Maine, United States

== See also ==
- Soame (disambiguation)
- Someș (disambiguation)
