= John May (cricketer) =

English cricketer (born 1845)

Personal information
- Full name: John May
- Born: 26 September 1845; Southampton, Hampshire, England
- Died: Unknown
- Batting: Right-handed
- Bowling: Right-arm fast

Domestic team information
- Years: Team
- 1867–1870: Hampshire

Career statistics
Competition	First-class
Matches	4
Runs scored	71
Batting average	11.83
100s/50s	–/–
Top score	28
Balls bowled	336
Wickets	6
Bowling average	27.50
5 wickets in innings	–
10 wickets in match	–
Best bowling	4/80
Catches/stumpings	–/–
- Source: Cricinfo, 1 February 2010

John May (born 26 September 1845 – date of death unknown) was an English first-class cricketer.

May was born at Southampton in September 1845. A club cricketer for the Southampton-based Union Club, he was described as a "good bowler" by the Hampshire Advertiser. He made his debut in first-class cricket for Hampshire against Kent at Gravesend in June 1867, and played against the same opposition at Southborough in July of the same year. He later made two further first-class appearances for Hampshire in 1869, both against Lancashire at Old Trafford and Southampton. Playing as a right-arm fast bowler, he took 6 wickets at an average of 27.50, with best figures of 4 for 80. As a batsman, he scored 71 runs at an batting average, with a highest score of 28. May's date of death is not recorded.
