= G. B. Harrison =

English academic and Shakespeare expert (1894–1991)

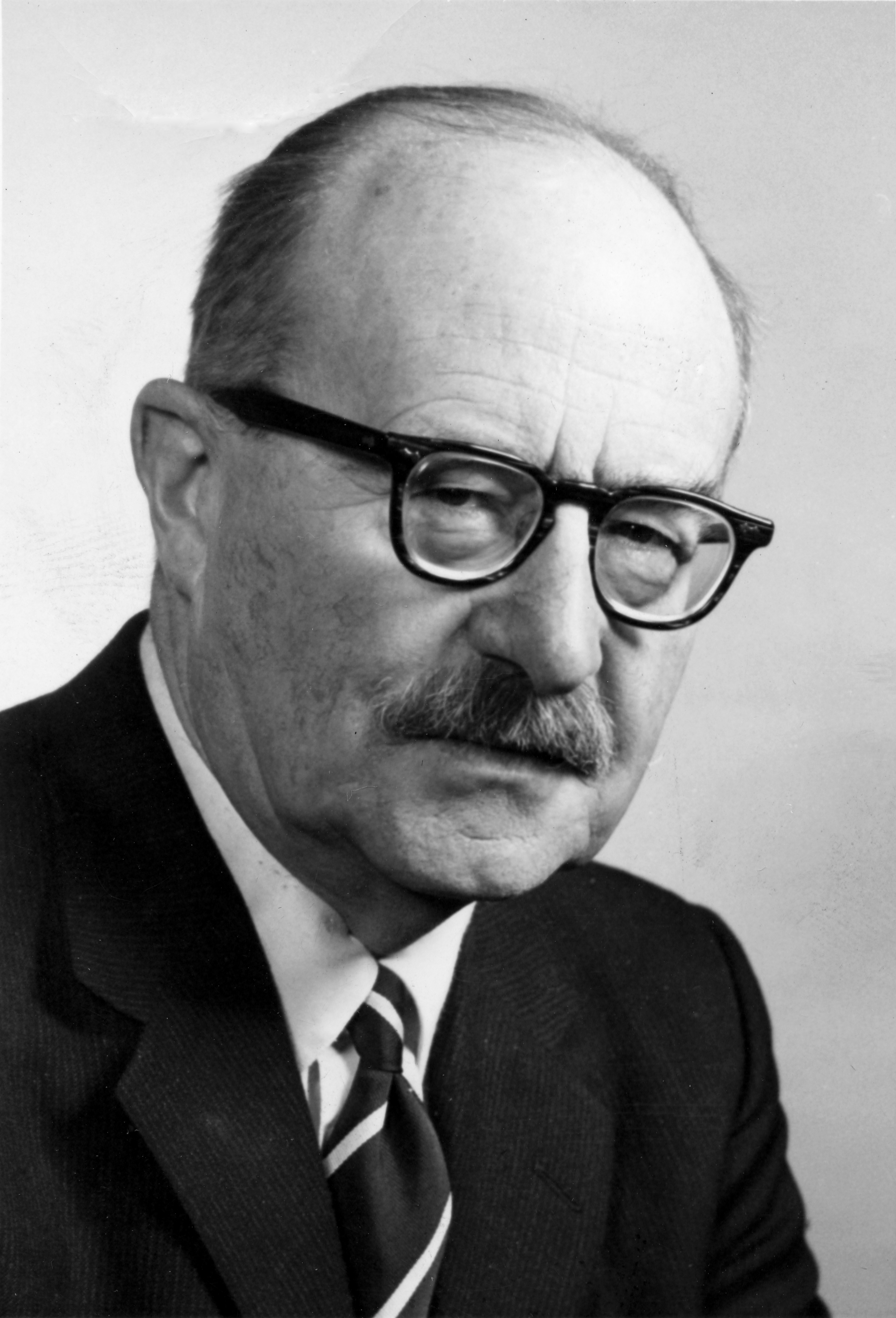
- Harrison (Bentley Historical Library, University of Michigan)
- Born: George Bagshawe Harrison; 14 July 1894; Hove, Sussex, England
- Died: 1 November 1991 (aged 97); New Zealand
- Occupations: Professor of English Language and Literature at Queen's University and the University of Michigan
- Known for: Editor of the Shakespeare Penguin Classics
- Notable work: Jacobean Journals, Elizabethan Journals, Shakespeare: the Man and his Stage and The Profession of English

G. B. Harrison (14 July 1894 – 1 November 1991) was one of the leading Shakespeare experts of his time and the editor of the Shakespeare Penguin Classics. During his professional career, Harrison was an English professor at both Queen's University and the University of Michigan. He was a firm believer in traditional Catholicism and was a member of the Advisory Committee of the International Commission of English in the Liturgy. The Advisory Committee was in charge of overseeing and organizing work on a modern English translation of the Latin Mass. In his lifetime, Harrison had an active part in both World Wars and lived a civilian's life in four countries.

== Early life and education ==
G. B. Harrison was born George Bagshawe Harrison on 14 July 1894 in Hove, Sussex, England. He was christened after his paternal grandfather. The middle name of Bagshawe was derived from his mother's side of the family. Although both of his parents envisioned high aspirations to fit a namesake that joined both sides of the family, an older Harrison wrote in his memoir that he "would have none of it." His father, Walter Harrison, had a master's degree in dentistry from Harvard and married Ada Louise Bagshawe. G. B. Harrison was the second oldest child of the family. He succeeded Walter Parker, and was followed by Richard.

Harrison grew up being read to. Soon he and Walter were demanding their favorite stories and seeking new ones. His mother took him to a kindergarten for both boys and girls, where Harrison slowly expanded his interest in reading until he could read for himself. Walter Harrison Sr. often took the boys to London for royal pageants and parades, popular in their time and giving way to vast crowds in Trafalgar Square. At the age of seven, Harrison continued his early education at the Brighton and Hove Boys' Preparatory School: Crescent House. Harrison furthered his education at Brighton College in order to receive the full "public school education." He attended Queens' College, Cambridge in 1913–1914, and again in 1919–1920 and in the Tripos received a first-class Honours BA degree in English. In 1923, he was awarded an MA degree. In 1928, Harrison earned a PhD in London (Harrison's Resume).

Harrison served in both World Wars. For most of World War I, he was based in Lucknow, India as a Second Lieutenant in the Queen's Royal Regiment (West Surrey). He noted it consisted of the only white troops in the garrison. He wrote to his parents nearly every day and noted the everyday aspects of life from training exercises and drills, to pickup sports matches, to sightseeing excursions. He kept careful track of whether or not he received mail in reply and often reminded his parents that their letter writing frequency was not quite up to par. The Christmas package that they sent, was, Harrison feared, at the bottom of the ocean, along with the ship that had been carrying it. Later on, Harrison was stationed in Mesopotamia (G. B. Harrison letters to parents). In World War II, Harrison became a Supplies Officer and later worked in Intelligence.

== Family and personal life ==
On 9 April 1919 Harrison married his wife, Dorothy. Together, the two had four children: Maurice, Joan, Michael and Anthony. Starting in 1910, Harrison kept up a frequent diary. He recorded everyday events and profound thoughts, and on December 31 of each year, he summed up the highs and lows and evaluated that particular year of his life as it related to all the others. At first, Harrison recorded these thoughts in marbled composition books, but later on he favored the Canadian Line Daily journal. When he moved to Michigan, Harrison replaced it with the similarly arrayed Collins Royal Diary (Harrison Diaries).

== Teaching career ==
Harrison started his career in 1924 as a reader at King's College London and held this position until his work was interrupted by the Second World War. In the event of war, Cambridge planned a scheme of dispersal for the various schools and colleges. When this scheme took effect in the year 1939, Harrison was not invited to accompany the college in exile. He applied to a vast number of places for work and this number included "all the universities in Canada" In May 1943, Harrison was informed of his appointment as head of the English Department at Queen's University in Ontario. Thus the family crossed the Atlantic Ocean and moved to Canada (Harrison's Memoir). His daughter attended Queen's Medical School and Harrison grew accustomed to his position as a member of the faculty (Letters to Rice).

Like most people, Harrison was tempted by a higher salary and a change of pace. He was offered a professorship at the University of Michigan, but before Harrison would accept, he sent several lines of inquiry to his future colleagues at Michigan. Harrison did not want to feel as if he was jumping ship on Queen's and its faculty and students who had never caused him grief or driven him to conflict (Letters to Rice).

Despite all of this, Harrison was also looking to expand his horizons. He was very concerned about budgeting and being able to pursue his own lines of interest. Harrison did not want to be tied down by University guidelines or teaching policy, and although Michigan offered him a better salary, Harrison also wanted to make sure that everything from the pension to the available housing in Ann Arbor aligned with his goals (Letters to Rice). There was also the matter of obtaining a Visa. To express these worries and various others, Harrison sent a flurry of letters to the Dean and various other members of the University of Michigan English Department. Harrison formally accepted his appointment to Michigan on 25 July 1948. After rounding out the first half of 1949 at Queen's, Harrison and Dorothy set out for Ann Arbor. Harrison officially took up post at the University of Michigan in the fall term of 1949 (Letters to Rice).

At the University of Michigan, Harrison became professor of Shakespearean and Elizabethan studies. He received various honorary degrees for his work and continued to teach until his retirement from Michigan. Harrison was reappointed almost immediately as a professor working on 1/3rd time for the winter term of January 1965. After this term, Harrison celebrated his official retirement, which happened to coincide with the 400th anniversary year of Shakespeare (News and Information). After retirement, Harrison worked on translating the Catholic Latin Mass into English and took part in the International Commission on English in the Liturgy.

== Published and edited works ==
What is perhaps Harrison's most well-known contribution to literary circles, although not many people are aware of his direct contribution, are the Shakespeare Penguin Classics, for which he was general editor. These relatively cheap, paperback copies were "intended for serious readers of books who preferred owning their own cop[ies]." Harrison also edited the Harcourt Brace College Shakespeare.

Harrison is also known for his many works on Shakespeare and his synthetic Elizabethan and Jacobean Journals. During his own studies, Harrison noticed that while there were notable books that centered on and analyzed Shakespeare, there was "nothing cheap, popular and portable." This led to Shakespeare: The Man and his Stage in 1923, which was written in collaboration with E. A. G. Lamborn. The book centered on Shakespeare, his plays, and the traditions of the time they were written in. In reviews, it was held up as successfully providing valuable academic content in simple, engaging and easy to understand language. Harrison found a way to convey historic events in a creative and engaging way in his Elizabethan Journals which included An Elizabethan Journal: Being a Record of Those Things Most Talked of During the Years 1591-1594,A Second Elizabethan Journal and A Last Elizabethan Journal. In his Jacobean Journals, Harrison proves adept at writing in and simulating seventeenth century style prose. As in the Elizabethan Journals, Harrison searches through primary historical evidence and weaves it into an engaging narrative in the form of multiple journals published under the titles: A Jacobean Journal: Being a Record of Those Things Most Talked of During the Years 1603-1606, and A Second Jacobean Journal: 1607-1610. Other notable works include biographies centered on John Bunyan and the Earl of Essex (G. B. Harrison Papers, Biography).

In 1962, Harrison published The Profession of English. It was to fill the role of a textbook of sorts, and, according to an education orientated reviewer, succeeded as a worthy "pedagogical autobiography." Instead of solely focusing on just the professor, the book also questions and encourages what students think. Harrison's original goal, as he states in the introduction, was to answer a question that his graduate assistant had earnestly asked as the pair were walking through Angell Hall at the University of Michigan. His graduate assistant boldly inquired after what Harrison was "trying to accomplish in [his] teaching and study of English literature." After pursuing various lines of inquiry with professors in all areas of the department, Harrison realized that no one had a ready and genuine answer to his graduate assistant's question. Not even Harrison himself had been able to answer without circling around the heart of the matter. Thus, in The Profession of English, Harrison sets out to answer this question and explore the broader implications of reading and studying English.

While G. B. Harrison was interested in and did write fiction, he ultimately ended up only publishing one novel. The Fires of Arcadia was published in 1956. It follows the life of a young lad and describes the various adventures that pepper his college experience.

Later, in 1985, Harrison published his memoir, One Man in His Time. He explores all aspects of and tries to make sense of his life in regards to the snippets of memory that pertain to the ordinary, everyday events of life. Everyone is, in a sense, only a product of the time that he or she lives in.

== Later years and retirement ==
After a long, successful career, G. B. Harrison and Dorothy retired to New Zealand, and Harrison wrote and published his memoir. George Bagshawe Harrison died at his New Zealand home on 1 November 1991.
