= General Examination for Women =

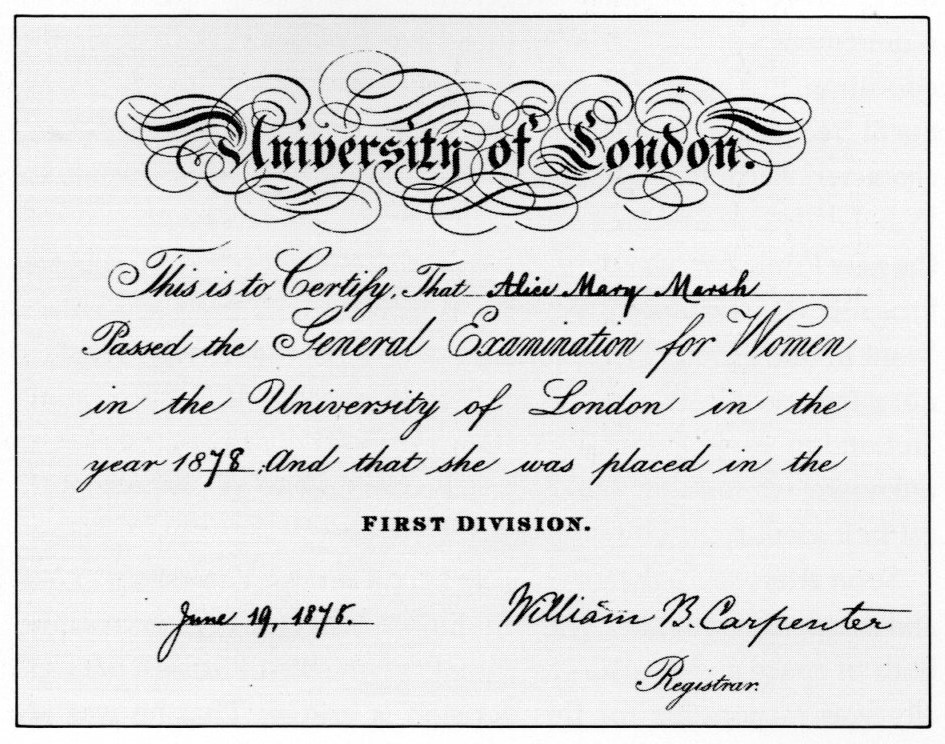
- Certificate awarded to Alice Marsh in 1878
- Administrator: University of London
- Skills tested: Humanities and sciences
- Purpose: Degree level qualification for women
- Year started: 1869 (admission 1868)
- Year terminated: 1878
- Languages: English

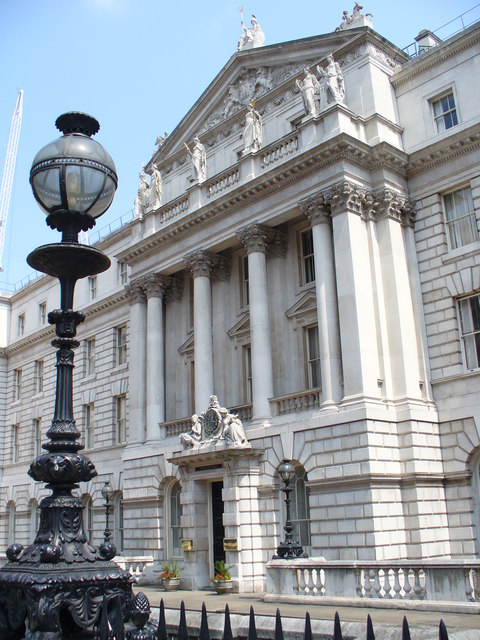
Somerset House

The General Examination for Women was an examination of the University of London first held in May 1869 that enabled women to receive a Certificate of Proficiency from the university but not a degree. It was a precursor to the award of degrees to women by the university a decade later. The first nine candidates to take the exam are sometimes known as "the London Nine".

== The examination ==
Candidates for the General Examination for Women were admitted to study at the University of London from 1868. The examination was first held in May 1869 with nine candidates participating. The results were assessed on 15 May 1869, at Somerset House on the Strand, by 17 male examiners. Although the exam could be taken from the age of 17, the average age of the candidates was 21.

In order to receive their certificate, the candidates had to pass a minimum of six papers from "Latin, English Language, English History, Geography, Mathematics, Natural Philosophy, two from Greek, French, German and Italian, and either Chemistry or Botany". The questions included an essay on the character of Queen Elizabeth I, a request to enumerate "the principal rivers in North America", and the calculation of the square root of 384524.01. On the advice of the Home Office, a "female attendant" or matron was made available in case the candidates should become over-excited by being brought to London for examination.

Despite the examination being as difficult as the existing Matriculation Examination, only a Certificate of Proficiency was issued to the successful candidates, rather than a degree.

== The "London Nine" ==
The first nine candidates in 1869, sometimes known as "the London nine", were:

- Marian Belcher (1849–1898) became headmistress of Bedford High School.
- Louise Hume von Glehn (1850–1936) became Louise Hume Creighton and wrote popular historical biographies and campaigned for working women and in the suffrage movement.
- Hendilah Lawrence
- Sarah Jane Moody (1844–1916) founded a preparatory school in Guildford with her sisters.
- Eliza Orme (1848–1937) became the first woman to earn a law degree in England and was active in the prison reform and suffrage movements.
- Kate Spiller (1847–1915) joined her local school board in Bridgwater, Somerset.
- Mary Anna Baker Watson (1828–1901) became a governess and school teacher in Northamptonshire.
- Isabella de Lancy West (studied at Bedford College)
- Susannah Wood (1844–1939) graduated with a BSc and taught mathematics. She became the vice-principal of the Cambridge Training College for Women (later Hughes Hall, Cambridge).

All passed with honours apart from Belcher, Lawrence, and Baker-Watson who did not pass. Belcher re-sat and passed in 1870.

The suffrage campaigner and translator Henrietta Frances Lord passed the exam in 1872.

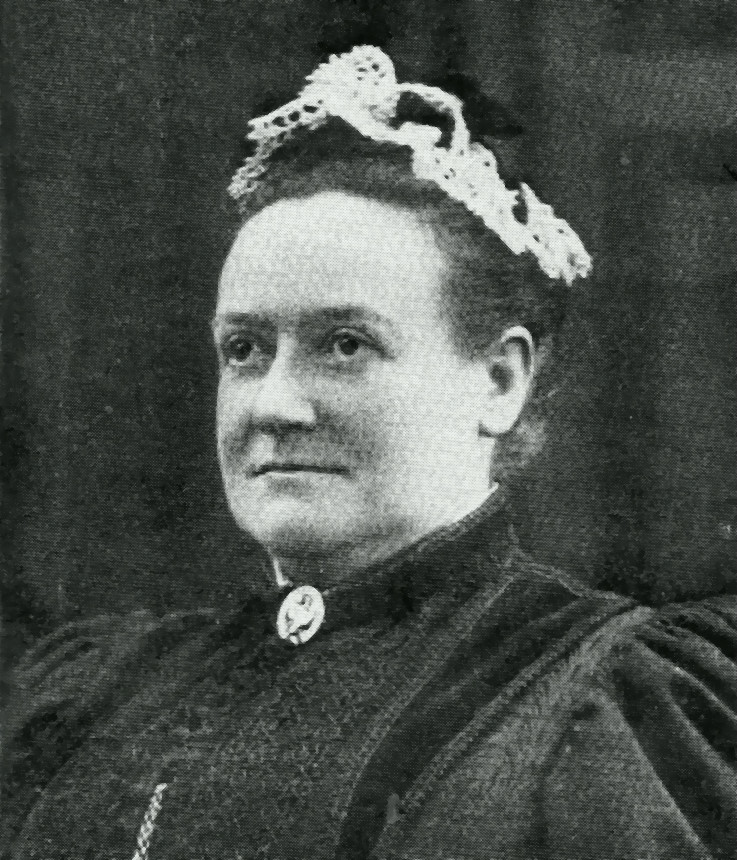
Marian Belcher

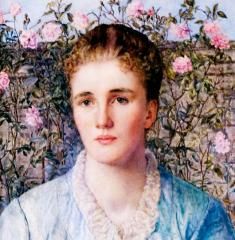
Louise Creighton aged 27 by Bertha Johnson, 1878.

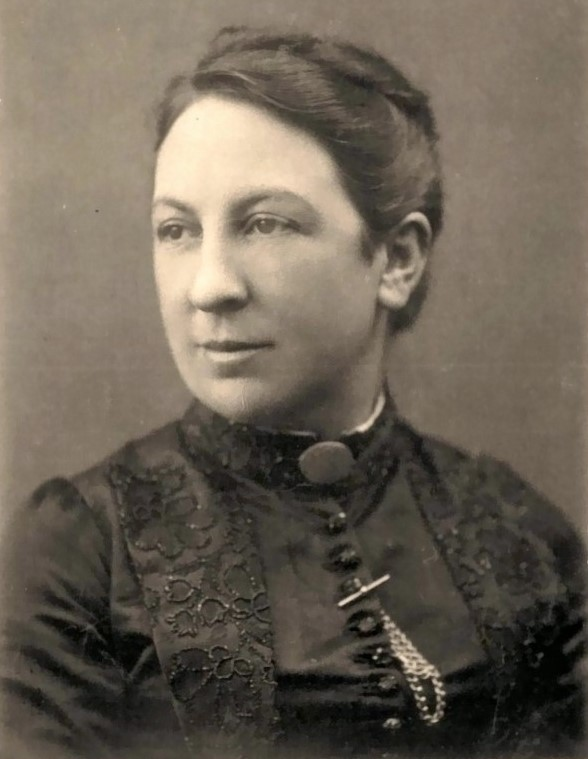
Eliza Orme

== Numbers ==
Over the subsequent decade until the exam was last held in 1878, over 264 candidates took the exam, some of whom were re-takes or additional qualifications meaning that the actual number of individual women who participated was somewhat lower than 264. Of these 139 passed, of whom 53 passed with honours.

Of the 139:

- 44 were pupils of Cheltenham Ladies College
- 40 prepared by private study or tuition
- 28 were pupils of the North London Collegiate School
- 27 attended other schools and institutions.

In 1878, there were 42 candidates of whom 24 passed.

== Legacy ==
The certificate ceased to be offered from 1878 as it provided evidence that there was no necessity to examine men and women separately. Women were allowed to study for University of London degrees from that year and the women-only colleges of Westfield and Royal Holloway were founded in 1882 and 1886 respectively. In 1895, 10% of the university's graduates were women, and 30% by 1900.

== See also ==
- Edinburgh Seven
