= Chris Grammer =

English cricketer

Personal information
- Full name: Christopher Mark Grammer
- Born: 1 October 1984 (age 42); Brighton, Sussex, England
- Batting: Left-handed
- Bowling: Slow left-arm orthodox

Domestic team information
- Years: Team
- 2009: Cambridge UCCE
- 2009: Cambridge University

Career statistics
Competition	First-class
Matches	4
Runs scored	113
Batting average	22.60
100s/50s	–/1
Top score	64
Balls bowled	136
Wickets	3
Bowling average	24.66
5 wickets in innings	–
10 wickets in match	–
Best bowling	2/35
Catches/stumpings	2/–
- Source: Cricinfo, 16 August 2020

Christopher Mark Grammer (born 1 October 1984) is an English former first-class cricketer.

Grammer was born at Brighton in October 1984. He was educated at Brighton College, before going up to Homerton College, Cambridge. While studying at Cambridge, he played first-class cricket for both Cambridge University and Cambridge UCCE in 2009, making three appearances for Cambridge UCCE against Yorkshire, Sussex and Essex, in addition to playing for Cambridge University against Oxford in The University Match at Fenner's. (Note: Cambridge UCCE differed from Cambridge University Cricket Club in that it was open to students at Anglia Ruskin University, whereas Cambridge University Cricket Club is exclusively for students of the constituent colleges of the University of Cambridge.) He scored 97 runs for Cambridge UCCE, with a high score of 64,
