= Listed buildings in Southborough, Kent =

Civil Parish in Kent, England

Southborough is a village and civil parish in the Borough of Tunbridge Wells of Kent, England. It contains 46 listed buildings that are recorded in the National Heritage List for England. Of these one is grade II* and 45 are grade II.

This list is based on the information retrieved online from Historic England.

== Key ==
Grade	Criteria
I	Buildings that are of exceptional interest
II*	Particularly important buildings of more than special interest
II	Buildings that are of special interest

== Listing ==
Name	Grade	Location	Type	Completed (Note: The date given is the date used by Historic England as significant for the initial building or that of an important part in the structure's description.)	Date designated	Grid ref. (Note: The grid reference is based on the British national grid reference system, sometimes known as OSGB36, used by the Ordnance Survey.) Geo-coordinates	Notes	Entry number (Note: The "List Entry Number" is a unique number assigned to each listed building and scheduled monument by Historic England.)	Image	Wikidata
War Memorial	II		war memorial		8 November 2000	TQ5761942932; 51°09′50″N 0°15′10″E		1247224	War Memorial More images	Q26539553
David Salomons House East Lodge	II	Broomhill Road	caretaker's house		10 December 1986	TQ5683441585; 51°09′07″N 0°14′28″E		1084773	David Salomons House East Lodge More images	Q26369064
Sir David Salomons' Motor Stables, Broomhill	II	Broomhill Road, TN3 0TG			1 June 2012	TQ5684941663; 51°09′10″N 0°14′29″E		1408552	Upload Photo	Q26676022
14, Church Road	II	14, Church Road			4 February 2002	TQ5774542772; 51°09′45″N 0°15′17″E		1389704	Upload Photo	Q26669137
Lady Catherine Stewart Monument	II	Hardinge Avenue, Birchwood			10 December 1986	TQ5705843171; 51°09′58″N 0°14′42″E		1084772	Upload Photo	Q26369059
28, Holden Corner	II	28, Holden Corner			10 December 1986	TQ5753042222; 51°09′27″N 0°15′05″E		1084777	Upload Photo	Q26369086
15 and 17, Holden Road	II	15 and 17, Holden Road			10 December 1986	TQ5779642517; 51°09′37″N 0°15′19″E		1084778	Upload Photo	Q26369092
Holden Cottage	II	27, Holden Road			27 October 1950	TQ5774942470; 51°09′35″N 0°15′16″E		1039902	Upload Photo	Q26291697
Holden House	II	Holden Road			27 October 1950	TQ5759742340; 51°09′31″N 0°15′08″E		1338656	Upload Photo	Q26622959
Bentham Hill Bentham Hill East Lodge East Lodge	II	Kibbles Lane			10 December 1986	TQ5741442143; 51°09′25″N 0°14′59″E		1372069	Upload Photo	Q26653195
55, London Road	II	55, London Road	building		12 July 1978	TQ5792842591; 51°09′39″N 0°15′26″E		1054696	55, London Road More images	Q26306355
Former Bat and Ball Public House	II	141, London Road, TN4 0NA	pub		10 December 1986	TQ5815542043; 51°09′21″N 0°15′37″E		1338682	Former Bat and Ball Public House More images	Q26622981
Former Weaver's Restaurant	II	London Road, TN4 0PU	building		27 October 1950	TQ5802442379; 51°09′32″N 0°15′30″E		1054720	Former Weaver's Restaurant More images	Q26306378
Little Bounds	II	London Road			27 October 1950	TQ5753743149; 51°09′57″N 0°15′07″E		1084780	Upload Photo	Q26369102
Lodge Gate	II	London Road	gatehouse		10 December 1986	TQ5756643265; 51°10′01″N 0°15′08″E		1338657	Lodge Gate More images	Q26622960
Mabledon Park	II	London Road	building		10 December 1986	TQ5803844683; 51°10′46″N 0°15′35″E		1084779	Mabledon Park More images	Q26369098
Nightingale's Flat the Nightingales	II	London Road			10 December 1986	TQ5776844020; 51°10′25″N 0°15′20″E		1039886	Upload Photo	Q26291678
St Catherine's	II	10, London Road			10 December 1986	TQ5757743029; 51°09′53″N 0°15′08″E		1372088	Upload Photo	Q26653215
Stuart Cottage	II	25 and 27, London Road	cottage		27 October 1950	TQ5781042770; 51°09′45″N 0°15′20″E		1084752	Stuart Cottage More images	Q26368956
Walls and Gatepiers to Former Entrance of Great Bounds	II	London Road	wall		10 December 1986	TQ5757443260; 51°10′01″N 0°15′09″E		1039895	Walls and Gatepiers to Former Entrance of Great Bounds More images	Q26291688
Windie Edge	II	19, London Road	architectural structure		10 December 1986	TQ5763043046; 51°09′54″N 0°15′11″E		1338658	Windie Edge More images	Q26622961
18, Modest Corner	II	18, Modest Corner			10 December 1986	TQ5704642381; 51°09′33″N 0°14′40″E		1084753	Upload Photo	Q26368961
22, Modest Corner	II	22, Modest Corner			10 December 1986	TQ5703042366; 51°09′32″N 0°14′39″E		1338683	Upload Photo	Q26622982
The Beehive	II	13, Modest Corner, TN4 0LS	pub		10 December 1986	TQ5707042398; 51°09′33″N 0°14′41″E		1054737	The Beehive More images	Q26306395
7, Pennington Road	II	7, Pennington Road			27 October 1950	TQ5806242752; 51°09′44″N 0°15′33″E		1084754	Upload Photo	Q26368966
Barn 10 Yards East of the Roundels	II	Pennington Road			10 December 1986	TQ5878042603; 51°09′38″N 0°16′10″E		1338684	Upload Photo	Q26622983
Barn 20 Yards to North of Ivy House Farmhouse	II	Pennington Road			10 December 1986	TQ5881042594; 51°09′38″N 0°16′11″E		1084755	Upload Photo	Q26368971
Church of St Thomas	II	Pennington Road	church building		10 December 1986	TQ5795642746; 51°09′44″N 0°15′27″E		1054017	Church of St Thomas More images	Q26305704
Ivy House Farmhouse	II	Pennington Road			27 October 1950	TQ5879742585; 51°09′38″N 0°16′10″E		1054049	Upload Photo	Q26305732
Valley House	II	Pennington Road			27 October 1950	TQ5854842641; 51°09′40″N 0°15′58″E		1367441	Upload Photo	Q26648944
Colebrook Or Southborough Viaduct Colebrook Viaduct Southborough Viaduct	II	Powder Mill Lane	railway viaduct		27 October 1950	TQ5945942869; 51°09′46″N 0°16′45″E		1054061	Colebrook Or Southborough Viaduct Colebrook Viaduct Southborough Viaduct More images	Q26305744
Christ Church	II	Prospect Road	church building		10 December 1986	TQ5783341938; 51°09′18″N 0°15′20″E		1084756	Christ Church More images	Q26368977
North Lodge to David Salomons' House	II	Speldhurst Road	building		14 March 1973	TQ5689041722; 51°09′12″N 0°14′31″E		1084757	North Lodge to David Salomons' House More images	Q26368982
Sir David Salomons House Wall and Terrace to South	II	Speldhurst Road			14 March 1973	TQ5683641626; 51°09′09″N 0°14′28″E		1187131	Upload Photo	Q26482356
Stables to East of Sir David Salomons' House	II*	Speldhurst Road			14 March 1973	TQ5701141654; 51°09′09″N 0°14′37″E		1298837	Upload Photo	Q17547688
Bentam Hill House	II	Stockland Green Road, TN3 0TJ, The Common			10 December 1986	TQ5689342106; 51°09′24″N 0°14′32″E		1084776	Upload Photo	Q26369082
Bentham Farmhouse	II	The Common			10 December 1986	TQ5693142280; 51°09′30″N 0°14′34″E		1338654	Upload Photo	Q26622957
Bentham Hill Bentham Hill, West Lodge West Lodge	II	The Common			10 December 1986	TQ5681141968; 51°09′20″N 0°14′27″E		1338655	Upload Photo	Q26622958
Cat's Castle Grove Lodge Oak Cottage	II	The Common			10 December 1986	TQ5755842891; 51°09′49″N 0°15′07″E		1084774	Upload Photo	Q26369071
Church of St Peter	II	The Common	church building		27 October 1950	TQ5755142784; 51°09′45″N 0°15′07″E		1338653	Church of St Peter More images	Q26622956
Woodcote	II	The Common			10 December 1986	TQ5770042737; 51°09′44″N 0°15′14″E		1084775	Upload Photo	Q26369075
Barn 25 Yards East of Honington Farm	II	Vauxhall Lane			10 December 1986	TQ5819643323; 51°10′02″N 0°15′41″E		1372028	Upload Photo	Q26653152
Barn 30 Yards West of Moat Farmhouse	II	Vauxhall Lane	barn		10 December 1986	TQ5905643836; 51°10′18″N 0°16′26″E		1372048	Barn 30 Yards West of Moat Farmhouse More images	Q26653172
Moat Farmhouse	II	Vauxhall Lane	farmhouse		10 December 1986	TQ5908443869; 51°10′19″N 0°16′27″E		1338686	Moat Farmhouse More images	Q26622985
Woods Cottage	II	1 and 2, Victoria Road			27 October 1950	TQ5717142224; 51°09′28″N 0°14′46″E		1084758	Upload Photo	Q26368987
David Salomons' House, Water Tower and Wall Attached to East	II	Speldhurst Road	house		14 March 1973	TQ5688441648; 51°09′09″N 0°14′31″E		1338685	David Salomons' House, Water Tower and Wall Attached to East More images	Q26622984

== See also ==
- Grade I listed buildings in Kent
- Grade II* listed buildings in Kent

== Sources ==
- Newman, John (2012) [1969], Kent: West and the Weald, The Buildings of England, New Haven and London: Yale University Press, ISBN 978-0-300-18509-6
