= Ollie Richards =

English rugby union player

- Born: 10 February 1992 (age 34) Brighton, England
- Height: 1.83 m (6 ft 0 in)
- Weight: 95 kg (14 st 13 lb)

Rugby union career
Senior career
| Years | Team | Apps | (Points) |
| | Leeds Carnegie | 32 | (40) |
| – | Newcastle Falcons | 14 | (25) |
| – | Esher | 34 | (65) |

Ollie Richards is a professional rugby union player who has played for Leeds Carnegie in the Aviva Championship and Newcastle Falcons in the Aviva Premiership

Educated at Blatchington Mill School and Sixth Form College and Brighton College, he was in the Harlequins Academy from the age of 15 before signing professionally and moving to Leeds at 18 years of age. At the end of the 2011/12 season Ollie signed for Newcastle Falcons in the Aviva Premiership.

Ollie made his Harlequins debut in the 2009 Middlesex Sevens and scored in every round, losing to Sale Sharks in the Plate Final.

In December 2010 Ollie was named in the England U20 squad.
