= Someș (disambiguation) =

Someș is a river that flows through Romania and Hungary.

Someș may also refer to:

- Someșul Cald, a river in Romania
- Someșul Mare, a river in Romania
- Someșul Mic, a river in Romania
- Someșul Rece, a river in Romania
- Ținutul Someș, an alternative name for Ținutul Crișuri, a region of Romania between 1938 and 1940

== See also ==
- Soames (disambiguation)
