= Blatchington Mill School =

Location
- Nevill Avenue; Hove, Sussex, BN3 7BW; England; 50.8456°N 0.1818°W

Information
- Type: Community school
- Motto: Involvement, Achievement, and Care
- Established: 1979; 47 years ago
- Local authority: Brighton and Hove Council
- Department for Education URN: 114606 Tables
- Ofsted: Reports
- Gender: coeducational
- Age range: 11–16
- Website: Blatchington Mill School

Blatchington Mill School is a coeducational secondary school in Hove, Brighton and Hove, for 11 to 16-year-olds.

== Admissions ==
It is a school of non-denominational religion. The total number of pupils in 2019, of all ages, was 1,553. It is in West Blatchington with access to the A27 via the A2038, and on the A2023.

== History ==
The school takes its name from the West Blatchington Windmill which is situated just East of the school gates.

=== Grammar school ===
Hove County Grammar School for Boys was on Holmes Avenue.

=== Comprehensive ===
Blatchington Mill School - originally Blatchington Mill school and Sixth-form College was formed in 1979 from the amalgamation of Hove Grammar School for Boys, Knoll Boys School, and Nevill County Secondary School.

=== 2024 fire ===
On 17 January 2024, a fire started in the school, with the East Sussex Fire and Rescue Service (ESFRS) called to the scene after smoke was reported at 5:40 p.m.. At its height, six fire engines were at the scene, and the last engine left at 6:30 a.m. the next day. No injures were reported, however the school was closed the next day and a 16-year-old girl was arrested on suspicion of arson.

== Academic performance ==
At secondary level in 2018, GCSE performance showed an average Progress 8 score, an above average Attainment 8 score and an above average proportion of children achieving Grade 5 or above in English & maths GCSEs.

At A level in 2018, the average result was D+ compared to B− in Brighton and Hove and C+ nationally.

Blatchington Mill School and Sixth Form College was last inspected by Ofsted during February 2017. The school was assessed as Good.

== Notable former pupils ==
=== Hove Grammar School for Boys ===
- Jim Parks, Sussex and England cricketer
- Barry V. L. Potter, Professor of Medicinal & Biological Chemistry
- Peter Wales, Sussex cricketer

=== Blatchington Mill School ===
- Bobby Barry – musician
- Gareth Barry – professional footballer with Manchester City F.C.
- Grace Carter (singer), musician
- Celeste, singer
- Mia Clarke – musician; former guitarist with Electrelane
- Lionel March, mathematician and architect
- Jack Pizzey (television), television documentary maker
- Katie Price – glamour model, author and television personality
- Dakota Blue Richards, actor
- Ollie Richards – England rugby player
- Michael Standing – professional footballer with Bradford City F.C.
- Jordan Stephens – musician; Rizzle Kicks
- Gary Willard, football referee
