= Katharine Westaway =

English classical scholar and headmistress

- Born: 8 February 1893; Dalton-in-Furness, Cumbria, England
- Died: 16 June 1973 (aged 80); Clapham, London, England
- Occupation: headteacher
- Known for: head of Bedford High School

Katharine Mary Westaway (8 February 1893 – 16 June 1973) was a British classical scholar and headmistress.

== Life ==
Westaway was born in Dalton-in-Furness. She was the only child of Mary Jane (born Collar) and Frederick William Westaway. Her parents were both teachers and her father had been a headmaster in Bristol and would later be an inspector of schools and science writer. Both her parents took a strong interest in their academically gifted only child.

In 1912, her honours in examinations at Bedford High School were rewarded with the offer of an open scholarship to study classics at Newnham College in Cambridge. Whilst studying for the classical tripos she also joined the college's debating society and she was elected president. She obtained a first in the second part of classical tripos but she would have been denied a degree because she wasn't a man. The war restricted her ambitions and she trained as a teacher at Cheltenham Ladies' College where she could have joined the staff. However she was offered a research fellowship which enabled her to study in Leiden and London whilst she prepared her thesis on The Educational Theory of Plutarch. In 1920, she started to teach classics at Royal Holloway College and two years later her thesis was published.

In 1924, she left her job as lecturer to become the head of her old school, Bedford High School. Bedford's previous head Miss Tanner, had been recruited by Roedean School and this created a vacancy. Westaway took up the position and returned to a staff that included some of her former teachers. She expanded the curriculum to include less traditionally academic subjects. New buildings were created including a gym and library. The school now offered domestic science and training in secretarial and nursery nursing.

In 1957, she published a history of the school, "Seventy-five Years: The Story of Bedford High School, 1882-1957".

Westaway died in Clapham in 1973.
