= Tim Hadcock-Mackay =

English hotelier and television presenter

Tim Hadcock-Mackay

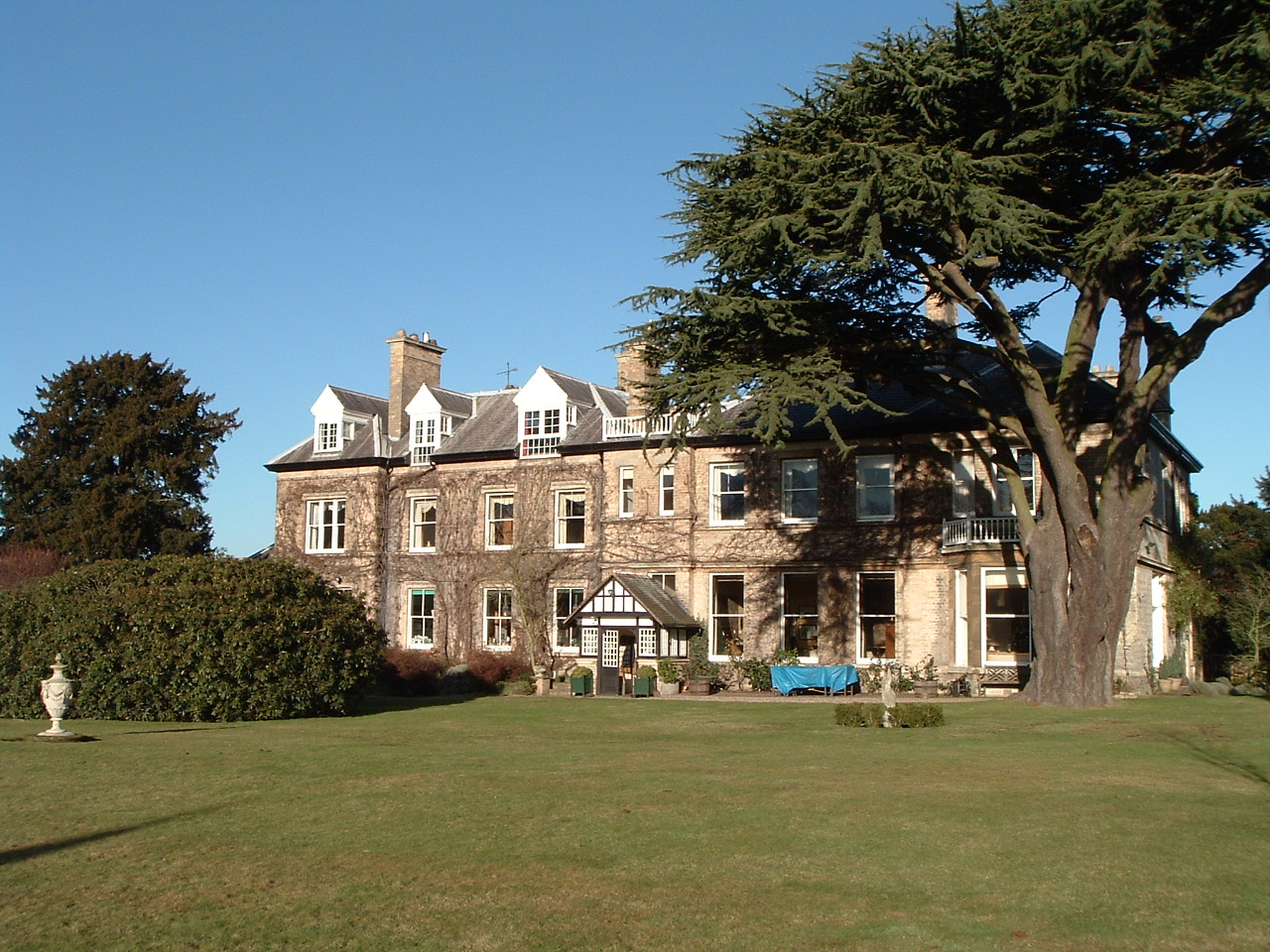
Barnby Moor Hall

Timothy Hadcock-Mackay (13 April 1963 – 29 July 2006, Barnby Moor, Nottinghamshire) was an English hotelier and television presenter.

Born Timothy Gin Hadcock in Derby, Derbyshire to Margaret and George Hadcock, who subsequently divorced, he was educated at boarding schools in Staffordshire and Shropshire. Considering a career in the British Army, after a careers lecture by a hotelier, he studied hotel and catering administration at Brighton College.

During his time in Brighton, he worked at the Grand Hotel, and on graduation in 1985 became night manager and then sales manager at the Stafford Hotel, St James, London. There he worked for Terry Holmes, who became his mentor. He then worked for Dukes hotels, Small Luxury Hotels of the World, and at the Ritz Hotel, London. In 1994 his mother married Major-General Eric Mackay, decorated for bravery during the Battle of Arnhem, and 31-year-old Tim so admired his new step-father that he took his name, and became Hadcock-Mackay.

After meeting William Burruss, he was offered $50,000 to found the European branch of Grand Heritage Hotels, Inns and Resorts. Established with partner David Owen, the first member, Hoar Cross Hall in Hoar Cross, Staffordshire, joined in 1993. Hadcock-Mackay inspected all potential Grand Heritage hotel members properties himself, before they were approved. In 2004 he was appointed chairman of Distinguished Hotels, that went into liquidation with debts of more than £1m in April 2006.

After the death of both his sister and the sister of his partner, he choose to make a side career in television. He initially featured in Channel 4's Can You Live Without?, where he ran the ancestral home Bradfield House in Devon without its normal 40 servants. He then presented both Ditch the Day Job and Time to Get Your House In Order, both for BBC Two. He also raised money for charity, including CLIC Sargent.

Hadcock-Mackay owned Barnby Moor Hall, near Retford, Nottinghamshire, where he lived with his partner Torquil Mackenzie Buist. A month after the failure of Distinguished Hotels, Hadcock-Mackay committed suicide at the house on 29 July 2006, aged 43.
