= William Churchill (cricketer) =

English cricketer and barrister

Personal information
- Full name: William Churchill
- Born: 6 October 1840; Winterborne Stickland, Dorset, England
- Died: 20 October 1907 (aged 67); Woking, Surrey, England
- Batting: Unknown

Domestic team information
- Years: Team
- 1870–1872: Marylebone Cricket Club

Career statistics
Competition	First-class
Matches	2
Runs scored	16
Batting average	5.33
100s/50s	–/–
Top score	12
Catches/stumpings	–/–
- Source: Cricinfo, 31 May 2021

William Churchill (6 October 1840 – 20 October 1907) was an English first-class cricketer and barrister.

The son of William Churchill senior, he was born in October 1840 at Winterborne Stickland, Dorset. He was educated at Brighton College, before going up to Trinity College, Cambridge. He was a member of Cambridge University Cricket Club, but did not feature in first-class cricket for the club. He graduated from Cambridge in 1864 and trained to become a barrister at Lincoln's Inn, being called to the bar in 1867. A keen amateur cricketer, Churchill made two appearances in first-class cricket for the Marylebone Cricket Club against Oxford University at Oxford in 1870, and Cambridge University at Fenner's in 1872. He scored 16 runs across his two appearances, with a highest score of 12. Churchill died at Woking in October 1907, unmarried and without issue. In his will he left money to a number of charitable causes, including the Dorset County Hospital and the Royal National Lifeboat Institution.
