= Harry Freeman (cricketer, born 1887) =

English cricketer and British Army officer

Personal information
- Full name: Harry Guy Vernon Meyrick Freeman
- Born: 26 July 1887; Holsworthy, Devon, England
- Died: 17 April 1926 (aged 38) near Burrington, Devon, England
- Batting: Unknown
- Bowling: Unknown

Domestic team information
- Years: Team
- 1910/11: Europeans
- 1911: Devon

Career statistics
Competition	First-class
Matches	1
Runs scored	0
Batting average	0.00
100s/50s	–/–
Top score	0
Balls bowled	186
Wickets	3
Bowling average	21.33
5 wickets in innings	–
10 wickets in match	–
Best bowling	2/35
Catches/stumpings	–/–
- Source: ESPNcricinfo, 12 November 2021

Harry Guy Vernon Meyrick Freeman (26 July 1887 – 17 April 1926) was an English first-class cricketer and British Army officer.

Freeman was born in Devon at Holsworthy in July 1887 and was educated at Brighton College, where he played for the college cricket team. After completing his education at Brighton, Freeman proceeded to attend the Royal Military College. He graduated from the Cheshire Regiment as a second lieutenant in February 1908. While stationed in British India in 1910, Freeman made an appearance in first-class cricket for the European cricket team against the Hindus in the final of the Bombay Triangular at Bombay. He was dismissed without scoring by Oghad Shankar in the Europeans first innings, while with the ball he dismissed S. K. Divekar and Shankar in the Hindus first innings, in their second innings he dismissed Mukundrao Pai, finishing with match figures of 3 for 64. In January 1911, he was promoted to lieutenant. Freeman played minor counties cricket for Devon in July 1911 (while presumably on leave from the army), making three appearances in the Minor Counties Championship.

In August 1911, he was seconded for service overseas by the Colonial Office and was attached to the Royal West African Frontier Force in British West Africa. He served in the First World War with the Cheshire Regiment, being promoted to captain in the war's early months. He retired from active service following the war in June 1920, later dying in a motorcycle accident near the Portsmouth Arms railway station in Devon on 17 April 1926.
