= Thea King =

British clarinettist (1925 – 2007)

Dame Thea King DBE FRCM FGSM
- Born: 26 December 1925; Hitchin, Hertfordshire
- Died: 26 June 2007 (aged 81) London, England
- Genres: Classical
- Instrument: Clarinet
- Years active: 1950s–2007

Dame Thea King DBE FRCM FGSM (26 December 1925 – 26 June 2007) was a British clarinettist.

== Biography ==
=== Early life ===
Thea King was born in Hitchin, Hertfordshire, the daughter of Henry Walter Mayer King, the manager of his family engineering business, and Dorothea (née Hass). She was educated at Bedford High School and won a scholarship to the Royal College of Music where she studied the piano with Arthur Alexander and the clarinet with Frederick Thurston. In January 1953 she married Frederick Thurston but he died from lung cancer in December of the same year. She never remarried.

=== Career ===
She worked as soloist, chamber musician and as a teacher but was probably associated most closely with the English Chamber Orchestra as principal clarinet from 1964 to 1999. She also worked with the London Mozart Players, succeeding Gervase de Peyer as principal clarinettist, the Sadler's Wells Opera Orchestra, the Melos Ensemble and the Allegri String Quartet. She was a founder member in 1953 of the Portia Wind Ensemble, an all female group.

Thea King made a special study of lesser known works of the 18th and 19th centuries, especially those of Crusell. She commissioned Elizabeth Maconchy's Fantasia and Howard Blake's Clarinet Concerto. Compositions dedicated to her by British composers include Benjamin Frankel's Clarinet Quintet (which she recorded in 1991, helping revive interest in the then neglected composer) and Gordon Jacob's Mini Concerto.

From 1961 to 1987, she was Professor of Clarinet at the Royal College of Music and she was a professor at the Guildhall School of Music and Drama from 1988 until her death. She was a Fellow of both institutions.

Thea King was made an OBE in 1985 and was appointed a DBE in 2001.
