= Ralph Oliphant-Callum =

English cricketer (born 1971)

Personal information
- Full name: Ralph David Oliphant-Callum
- Born: 26 September 1971 (age 55); Twickenham, London, England
- Batting: Right-handed
- Role: Wicket-keeper

Domestic team information
- Years: Team
- 1992–1993: Oxford University

Career statistics
Competition	First-class
Matches	5
Runs scored	48
Batting average	9.60
100s/50s	–/–
Top score	19
Catches/stumpings	1/–
- Source: Cricinfo, 16 February 2020

Ralph David Oliphant-Callum (born 26 September 1971) is an English educator and former first-class cricketer.

== Early life and career ==
Oliphant-Callum was born at Twickenham in September 1971. He was educated at Brighton College, before going up to Brasenose College, Oxford. While studying at Oxford, he played first-class cricket for Oxford University, making his debut against Durham at Oxford in 1992. He played first-class cricket for Oxford until 1993, making five appearances. Playing as a wicket-keeper, he scored a total of 48 runs with a high score of 19. After graduating from Oxford, he became a schoolteacher. He was the housemaster of Durnford House at Eton College. He remains a master at Eton College.
