= Soame =

Soame may refer to:

- Soame Jenyns (1704–1787), English writer and Member of Parliament
- Roger Soame Jenyns (1904–1976), British art historian
- Steven Soame (c.1540–1619), English merchant and politician
- Thomas Soame (1584–1671), English politician

== See also ==
- Soames (disambiguation)
