= Thomas Belcher (cricketer) =

English cricketer, clergyman, and schoolmaster

Personal information
- Full name: Thomas Hayes Belcher
- Born: 12 September 1847; Faringdon, Berkshire, England
- Died: 26 November 1919 (aged 72); Bramley, Hampshire, England
- Batting: Right-handed
- Bowling: Right-arm roundarm fast
- Relatives: Gordon Belcher (son)

Domestic team information
- Years: Team
- 1869–1870: Oxford University

Career statistics
Competition	First-class
Matches	7
Runs scored	58
Batting average	11.60
100s/50s	–/–
Top score	23
Balls bowled	1,173
Wickets	20
Bowling average	20.57
5 wickets in innings	–
10 wickets in match	–
Best bowling	4/22
Catches/stumpings	4/–
- Source: Cricinfo, 19 January 2020

Thomas Hayes Belcher (12 September 1847 — 26 November 1919) was an English first-class cricketer, clergyman and schoolmaster.

Belcher was born at Faringdon in September 1847. He studied on a scholarship in classics at The Queen's College, Oxford. While studying at Oxford, he played first-class cricket for Oxford University on seven occasions in 1869–70. A right-arm roundarm fast bowler, Belcher took 20 wickets at an average of 20.57, with best figures of 4 for 22. Upon graduating from Oxford he took holy orders and became a schoolmaster. He initially taught at the Hereford Cathedral School for two years, and for seven years thereafter he was the senior assistant master at Malvern College. In 1881, he was elected to the post of principal of Brighton College, a role he held until 1892. He retired in 1892 and upon doing so he became the rector of St James' Church at Bramley, Hampshire. He remained in the post of rector until his death in November 1919. His son, Gordon, also played first-class cricket. Gordon and two other sons, Harold and Raymond were killed in the First World War, while his son Arthur was the headmaster of Brighton College in 1933.

Thomas Belcher's sister Marian Belcher (1849–1898) was headmistress at Bedford High School.
