= Henry Soames =

English cricketer

Personal information
- Born: 18 January 1843; Brighton, Sussex, England
- Died: 30 August 1913 (aged 70); Laverstock, Wiltshire, England
- Relatives: William Soames (brother)

Domestic team information
- Years: Team
- 1867: Hampshire

Career statistics
Competition	First-class
Matches	1
Runs scored	54
Batting average	27.00
100s/50s	0/1
Top score	52
Catches/stumpings	0/–
- Source: Cricinfo, 29 September 2012

Henry Soames (18 January 1843 — 30 August 1913) was an English first-class cricketer and British Army officer.

== Biography ==
Soames was the son of William Soames, who founded Brighton College in 1845. He was born in Brighton in January 1843 and was educated at his fathers' college. After completing his education at Brighton, Soames enlisted in the British Army and was commissioned as a lieutenant in the Royal Artillery in January 1863.

Soames played first-class cricket for Hampshire in 1867, appearing in a single match against Kent at Southborough. Batting twice in the match, he was dismissed in Hampshire's first innings for 2 runs by George Bennett, while in their second innings he was dismissed for 52 runs by Charles Payne, with his score being the highest score of the Hampshire innings.

In the Royal Artillery, his promotion to captain followed in December 1875, before his subsequent retirement in November 1881.

Soames retired to Laverstock near Salisbury in Wiltshire, where he died from heart failure in August 1913, leaving an estate worth a net of £48,573. His brothers were William, a cricketer, and Arthur, a politician and architect.
