= Geoffrey Hett =

British fencer (1909–1988)

Personal information
- Born: 5 March 1909 Marylebone, England
- Died: November 1988 (aged 79)

Sport
- Sport: Fencing

Geoffrey Hett (5 March 1909 – November 1988) was a British fencer. The son of Geoffrey Seccombe Hett, the eminent ear, nose, and throat surgeon, he was educated at Brighton College and Cambridge University. Captain of the Cambridge University fencing team in 1930, he competed in the team foil event at the 1936 Summer Olympics.
