= Southborough, Kent =

Town and civil parish in Kent, England

Coordinates: 51.1598°N 0.2652°E

Southborough
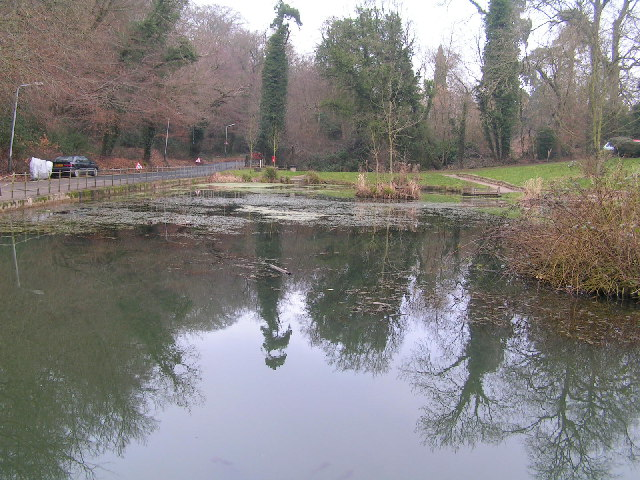
- Holden Pond, Southborough.

- Location within Kent
- Population: 11,124 (2001 Census)
- OS grid reference: TQ585425
- District: Tunbridge Wells
- Shire county: Kent
- Region: South East
- Country: England
- Sovereign state: United Kingdom
- Post town: Tunbridge Wells
- Postcode district: TN4
- Dialling code: 01892
- Police: Kent
- Fire: Kent
- Ambulance: South East Coast
- UK Parliament: Tunbridge Wells

Southborough is a town and civil parish in the borough of Tunbridge Wells in Kent, England. It lies immediately to the north of the town of Tunbridge Wells and includes the district of High Brooms, with the A26 road passing through it. According to the 2001 census it had a population of 11,124. The town is within the High Weald Area of Outstanding Natural Beauty.

== Origin of name ==
After the Norman Conquest, the area came within the domain of Tonbridge Castle, one of 4 boroughs to do so. This was the South Borough.

== Governance ==
Southborough separated from Tonbridge in 1871 when its own board of health was formed. In 1894, it was recreated to become an urban district, with its own elected council to manage its affairs. It retained that title until 1974, when under local government reorganisation it became a civil parish. By historical accident, however, Southborough had a Town Council, which it has retained.

Southborough Town Council consists of 18 members, from the three town wards: North (seven Councillors); West (six Councillors); and East/High Brooms (five Councillors). The posts of mayor and deputy mayor are elected annually. As with many other Parish Councils, its responsibilities are less than those of the local Borough Council. At the same time, Southborough is part of Tunbridge Wells borough: the two wards of that borough are Southborough and High Brooms (three councillors) and Southborough North (two). The town has its own grant of heraldry: this includes reference to the cricket ball industry and contains two sprigs of broom, alluding to High Brooms.

== History ==
The Southborough Society'’ ("the civic, heritage and amenity society for Southborough") is the main source for many of the facts in this part of the article

The remains of an Iguanodon (135 million years ago) was discovered in High Brooms. Before the first millennium AD the land here was heavily forested; however some significant finds have revealed that it was inhabited. Arrowheads and stone axe heads provide evidence of ‘’'prehistoric'’’ habitation of Southborough while burial sites from both the Bronze and Iron Ages have also been unearthed. The site of the Castle Hill Iron Age Fort, dating back to 315 BC, lies in the Eastern valley. Routes linking other forts are still part of the town’s road network. Little is then known about the district until the Norman Conquest as it was the most sparsely populated part of the Weald due to the almost impenetrable forest.

Richard Fitz Gilbert (later de Clare) was rewarded for his part in the conquest with land; one such grant was the Lowey of Tunbridge, an area of land equating with the holdings of a manor, which covered some 20,660 acres (8347h) on the Weald and across the River Medway valley. He was also granted the right to build a castle at Tonbridge.

The Manor of Southborough was one part of the Lowey. Over the following seven hundred years it had a chequered history. After Richard de Clare, it was held by the Audley and Stafford families until 1521, when Edward Stafford, 3rd Duke of Buckingham, was beheaded on Tower Hill and the estates reverted to the Crown. Henry VIII gave the (now separated from Tonbridge) estate to George Boleyn, brother of Anne Boleyn, whose fate he also suffered. It was then passed to John Dudley, Earl of Warwick, who later exchanged it for other estates. Under Elizabeth I it had again reverted to the Crown: she bestowed it on Sir Richard Sackville who sold it to Thomas Smythe of Westernhanger. He was commonly known as Customer Smythe, a "farmer" of the collection of customs and excise dues. In 1790 when Lady Smythe died the Manor was split up and sold; the Manor House of Great Bounds and the Manorial rights being purchased by the Earl of Darnley who in turn parted with it to James Alexander.

The whole area was part of the Royal forest of Southfrith until about the middle of the 16th century, reserved by royalty for hunting. The settlement consisted of a number of isolated hamlets including Nonsuch Green, Holden Corner, Modest Corner and a few houses near the Common. High Brooms was a desolate tract inhabited by Romany Gypsies, very many of Kent's population today will have Gypsy heritage – whether they choose to admit this is another matter.

From 1639, lodging houses appeared in Southborough to accommodate visitors to the newly discovered chalybeate spring at The Pantiles, Tunbridge Wells. During the reign of King Charles I, the Cavalier faction tended to stay at Southborough, whilst nearby Rusthall tended to attract visitors from the Roundhead (puritan) faction.

== Industrial Southborough ==
Iron was worked in the area since prehistoric times, since the underlying rock (the iron-rich sandstone of the Hastings Beds which make up the Weald) provided the raw material. From the mid-16th century onwards there were a number of water-powered furnaces on the two streams running through the town: one at Modest Corner; and three on the Southborough Bourne. The latter included the Vauxhall Furnace, operating from at least 1552, near Mote Farm in what is now Vauxhall Lane: and the Brook (Broakes) Mill opened in 1553. The rock was dug from "bell pits", and iron smelted here was worked at a forge nearby.

The forges probably continued working until the 18th century when the making of iron became uneconomical and in 1771 the sites were taken over for gunpowder manufacturing hence the name Powder Mill Lane. The mill blew up shortly afterwards but was replaced and continued manufacturing gunpowder. By 1845 a cornmill had been erected on the site, which continued in operation until 1942 when it was demolished. There are now no traces of any industrial workings on the site.

Apart from that heavy industrial employment, people in Southborough were mainly occupied in Agriculture, Textiles and Transport: trades such as Blacksmiths, Coachbuilders and Harness makers.

With cricket being played on the common, it is perhaps logical that the town became renowned for the manufacture of cricket balls. The first recorded makers were Philip Wickham and Joseph Smith of Modest Corner and many other cricket ball makers set up business including Thomas Twort and John Martin in 1853.

Southborough began to expand rapidly from 1879 when the Holden Estate was sold and laid out to accommodate 165 new dwellings. The High Brooms Brick and Tile Company started to build houses for its employees and the area expanded: it is now an industrial estate.

== Southborough Common ==
The Common of Southborough (now owned by the Town Council) has always been part of the Manorial Holding. It was originally around 30 acres (120,000 m^{2}) larger but between 1790 and 1810 portions were enclosed so that the total area now is 71 acres (290,000 m^{2}). Under the Commons Registration Act 1965, a number of persons registered their rights as Commoners.

In 2003, the whole area of the Common – a conservation area – was the subject of an appraisal by Tunbridge Wells Borough Council. The appraisal report seeks to retain the historical significance of the Common and its immediate area.

Cricket has been played on the Common for over 200 years.

== Twinning ==
On 18 October 1992, Southborough twinned with the town of Lambersart, France. The Twinning Charter signed by both towns formally resolved to honour the twinning relationship by establishing and maintaining friendly relations with each other, to foster and develop mutual understanding and respect between the people of their respective administrative areas, to favour all kinds of links between the two regions especially in the educational and cultural fields, to encourage exchange visits and to develop human and cultural relationships and establish a firm foundation for future understanding, respect and friendship between their people for all time. To celebrate five years of twinning on 18 October 1997 Lambersart Close on the new Barnetts Wood housing estate was officially unveiled followed by a reception at the Salomons Estate.

A friendship between the towns of Southborough and Kaniv in Ukraine began in the year 2001, when representatives of the towns met at the European Project for Youth in Lambersart. The friendship developed strongly and in 2005 the Southborough and Kaniv Association (SAKA) was founded. Now citizens of Southborough visit Kaniv as welcome guests and citizens of Kaniv are similarly welcomed in Southborough. SAKA has its own website – www.southboroughandkanivassociation.com.

== Media ==
Local news and television programmes are provided by BBC South East and ITV Meridian. Television signals are received from the Tunbridge Wells TV transmitter. Local radio stations are BBC Radio Kent, Heart South, Gold, KMFM West Kent and West Kent Radio, a community radio station. The town is served by the local newspapers, Kent and Sussex Courier and Kent Messenger.

== Sport ==
Southborough has long been associated with sport. Cricket has been played on the common for over 200 years and the town was a centre for cricket ball manufacture until 1978. Southborough Cricket Club play on the common. Their ground was used a number of times by the Kent Women cricket team between 1957 and 1971 and B. M. Close's Ground, a ground to the east of the town, was used for one first-class cricket match by Kent County Cricket Club in 1867.

Southborough has four football clubs, the largest of these is Ridgewaye FC. Ridgewaye F.C. formed in 1995. It is the largest youth organisation in Southborough having 550 members in 2016. It has been an FA Community Standard Club since January 2013. The membership consists of boys and girls aged from six to eighteen years of age who play on Saturday and Sunday mornings at the Ridgewaye fields, off Yew Tree Road, Southborough from September to May. Southborough Dads FC currently play in the Soccer Sixes Thursday night league and have just won the league.

Southborough and District Wheelers is a long-established cycling club which has thrived in recent years. It caters for cyclists of all abilities, organising both social and competitive rides.

== Theatre ==
The Royal Victoria Hall Theatre was built in commemoration of the Diamond Jubilee of Queen Victoria, It opened in 1900. It was the first Municipal Theatre in England. unsympathetic Building alterations during the 1970s have prevented the Royal Victoria Hall from being listed. In January 2015, it was announced that the theatre would close after the end of the run of the pantomime Peter Pan. Demolition could follow. A campaign to save the theatre collected thousands of signatures both online and by hand and having been collected and presented to Southborough Town Council failed. In 2017 the theatre was demolished, to be replaced with a new community hub, construction of which finished in 2021

== Notable people ==
- Edward Colebrooke (1858–1939), cricketer
- Clare Hollands (born 1973), lawyer and one of the first female members of the Association of Cricket Umpires and Scorers was brought up in Southborough
- John Harvey Rainier (1847–1915), admiral

== See also ==
- Listed buildings in Southborough, Kent
