= Leonard Berney =

British soldier (1920–2016)

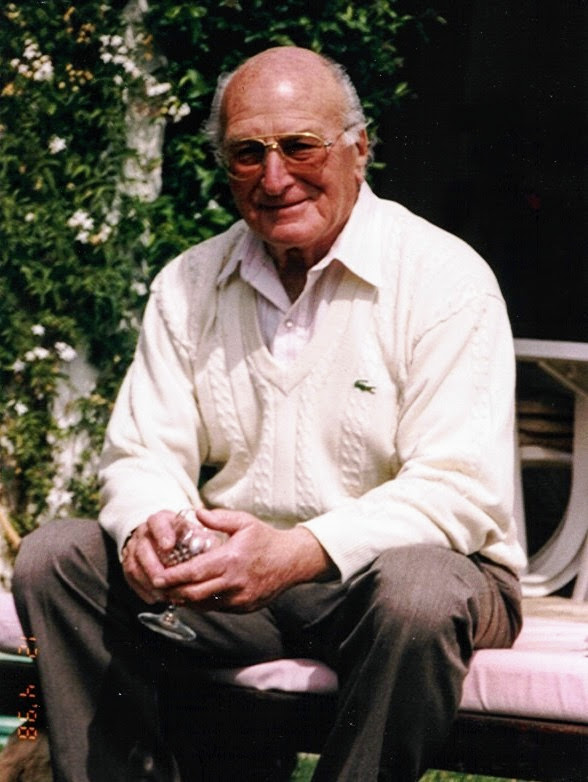
- Leonard Berney in his 80s
- Born: 11 April 1920; London, England
- Died: 7 March 2016 (aged 95)
- Military career
- Allegiance: United Kingdom
- Branch: British Army
- Service years: 1939–1946
- Rank: Lieutenant-Colonel
- Conflicts: Second World War
- Other work: Company Managing Director

Lieutenant-Colonel Leonard Berney (11 April 1920 – 7 March 2016) was a British soldier who was one of the first British officers at the liberation of Bergen-Belsen. He also testified in the Belsen trial.

In 2015 to mark the 70th anniversary of the end of the Holocaust, he published the memoir Liberating Belsen Concentration Camp – A Personal Account by (former) Lt-Colonel Leonard Berney. He attended Brighton College and then St Paul's School, London 1933–38.
