= Malcolm MacDonald (Canadian politician) =

Canadian politician

Malcolm MacDonald (July 10, 1836 – September 23, 1902) was a merchant, ship owner, shipbuilder and political figure on Prince Edward Island. He represented 3rd Kings in the Legislative Assembly of Prince Edward Island from 1900 to 1902 as a Liberal.

He was born in Uigg, Prince Edward Island, the son of Donald MacDonald and Margaret Gordon, and was educated there. He married Grace Snelgrave in 1872. MacDonald established a shipbuilding and trading firm at Montague Bridge in partnership with Lewis Westaway. He was an unsuccessful candidate for a seat in the provincial assembly in 1882, 1893 and 1897. He served as a minister without portfolio in the province's Executive Council. MacDonald died in office in Charlottetown at the age of 66.
