= Richard Kirwan (cricketer) =

English cricketer and clergyman (1829–1872)

Personal information
- Full name: Richard Kirwan
- Born: 7 January 1829; Boulogne, Pas-de-Calais, France
- Died: 2 September 1872 (aged 43); Sidmouth, Devon, England
- Batting: Unknown

Career statistics
Competition	First-class
Matches	1
Runs scored	2
Batting average	1.00
100s/50s	–/–
Top score	2
Catches/stumpings	–/–
- Source: Cricinfo, 6 August 2019

Richard Kirwan (7 January 1829 – 2 September 1872) was an English first-class cricketer and clergyman.

The son of Captain Richard Kirwan, of the Royal Fusiliers, he was born in France at Boulogne. He was educated at Brighton College, before going up to Emmanuel College, Cambridge. Kirwan made a single appearance in first-class cricket for the Gentlemen of England against a United England Eleven at Hove in 1853. Batting twice in the match, he was dismissed in the Gentlemen of England first-innings for 2 runs by Tom Adams, while in their second-innings he was dismissed without scoring by John Wisden.

He graduated from Cambridge in 1853 and was ordained in the Church of England in 1855. He was the curate of Little Bardfield in Essex from 1855–57 and Gosfield from 1857–60. He moved to Devon in 1860, where he took up the post of rector of Gittisham until 1872. Kirwan drowned while bathing in the sea off Sidmouth in September 1872. He had married Rose Helen Lampet in 1860, with the couple having at least one son.
