= Gordon Lyon (cricketer) =

English cricketer and educator

Personal information
- Full name: Gordon William Francis Lyon
- Born: 22 May 1905; Bradford-on-Avon, Wiltshire, England
- Died: 22 December 1932 (aged 27); Steyning, Sussex, England
- Batting: Right-handed

Domestic team information
- Years: Team
- 1925–1927: Oxford University

Career statistics
Competition	First-class
Matches	9
Runs scored	262
Batting average	16.37
100s/50s	0/1
Top score	52
Balls bowled	7
Wickets	1
Bowling average	5.00
5 wickets in innings	0
10 wickets in match	0
Best bowling	1/5
Catches/stumpings	7/–
- Source: Cricinfo, 23 May 2020

Gordon William Francis Lyon (22 May 1905 – 22 December 1932) was an English first-class cricketer and educator.

Lyon was born in May 1905 at Bradford-on-Avon, Wiltshire. He was educated at Brighton College, before going up to Wadham College, Oxford. While studying at Oxford, he played first-class cricket for Oxford University, making his debut against the Free Foresters at Oxford in 1925. He played first-class cricket for Oxford until 1927, making nine appearances. Lyon scored a total of 262 runs in his nine matches, at an average of 16.37 and a high score of 52.

After graduating from Oxford, Lyon became a schoolmaster. He died in Sussex at Steyning in December 1932, leaving Brighton College Scholarship Trustees £2,068.
