= Gordon Belcher =

English cricketer and British Army officer

Personal information
- Full name: Gordon Belden Belcher
- Born: 26 September 1885; Brighton, Sussex, England
- Died: 16 May 1915 (aged 29); Richebourg, Pas-de-Calais, France
- Batting: Right-handed
- Bowling: Right-arm medium
- Relatives: Thomas Belcher (father)

Domestic team information
- Years: Team
- 1905: Hampshire
- 1910–1913: Berkshire

Career statistics
Competition	First-class
Matches	1
Runs scored	0
Batting average	0.00
100s/50s	–/–
Top score	0
Balls bowled	6
Wickets	0
Bowling average	–
5 wickets in innings	–
10 wickets in match	–
Best bowling	–
Catches/stumpings	–/–
- Source: Cricinfo, 14 December 2022

Gordon Belden Belcher MC (26 September 1885 – 16 May 1915) was an English first-class cricketer, educator and British Army officer.

The son of the cricketer and educator Thomas Belcher, he was born in the Brighton neighbourhood of Kemp Town in June 1870. He was educated at Brighton College, where his father Rev. Thomas Hayes Belcher was principal from 1881 to 1892. He left the college in 1904, matriculating to St Catharine's College, Cambridge. At Cambridge, he was a member of Cambridge University Cricket Club but did not play at first-class level for the university. However, he did play first-class cricket for Hampshire during his studies, making a single appearance against Warwickshire at Southampton in the 1905 County Championship. He was dismissed twice in the match without scoring by Frank Field and Crowther Charlesworth. After graduating from Cambridge, he became a master at Reading School and was commissioned into the school's Officers' Training Corps as a second lieutenant in December 1908. He was gazetted in May 1910 as a second lieutenant in the 3rd (Militia) Battalion, Princess Charlotte of Wales's (Royal Berkshire Regiment).

While employed at the school, he played minor counties cricket for Berkshire between 1910 and 1913, making 27 appearances in the Minor Counties Championship. He was promoted to lieutenant in February 1912, the same year that he moved to Brighton College to teach.

Belcher served in the First World War, which began in August 1914, with his regiment, the Royal Berkshires, seeing action on the Western Front. He awarded the Military Cross in February 1915, after having been promoted to captain in January. Belcher was killed in action on 16 May 1915 at Richebourg during the Battle of Festubert. He was buried at the Rue-des-Berceaux Military Cemetery. Belcher's brothers, Harold and Raymond and paternal first cousin Basil, alumni of Brighton College were also killed during the war.
