= William Soames =

English cricketer

Personal information
- Full name: William Aldwin Soames
- Born: 10 July 1850; Brighton, Sussex, England
- Died: 27 December 1916 (aged 66); City of London, England
- Batting: Right-handed
- Relatives: Henry Soames (brother); Arthur Soames (politician) (brother)

Domestic team information
- Years: Team
- 1875: Sussex

Career statistics
Competition	First-class
Matches	3
Runs scored	17
Batting average	3.40
100s/50s	0/0
Top score	17
Catches/stumpings	2/–
- Source: Cricinfo, 29 September 2012

William Aldwin Soames (10 July 1850 – 27 December 1916), known as Aldwin Soames, was an English cricketer. Soames was a right-handed batsman. He was born at Brighton, Sussex, and was educated at Brighton College, which his father, William Aldwin Soames, had founded in 1845, and at Trinity College, Cambridge.

Soames made his first-class debut for Sussex against Hampshire at the Green Jackets Ground, Winchester, in 1875. He made two further first-class appearances for the county in 1875, against Hampshire at the County Ground, Hove, and Gloucestershire at the College Ground, Cheltenham. In his three first-class matches for the county, he scored 17 runs at an average of 3.40, with a high score of 17. His 17 runs all came in the first-innings of his first match against Hampshire, thereafter he failed to score in four consecutive innings. According to Scores and Biographies, "[he] is a good average bat and fields well at long-leg or cover-point."

He died at Bank station in the City of London on 27 December 1916. His brother, Henry, played first-class cricket for Hampshire.

== Career and family ==
William Aldwin Soames was a solicitor with the firm of Soames & Thompson, of London. He acquired the estate at Moor Park, Farnham, Surrey. His father had been a prosperous Russian merchant and partner in Wilkie & Soames, soap makers. He married (Caroline) Louisa Jackson, the daughter of a Manchester merchant, by whom he had nine children, including Jack Soames, of Bergeret, Nanyuki, Kenya (today the Soames Hotel), a notorious member of the Happy Valley set who was called as a witness in the Lord Erroll murder trial.
