= Lewis Westaway =

Canadian politician

Lewis John Westaway (November 12, 1821 – November 23, 1885) was a merchant, ship's captain, ship owner and political figure on Prince Edward Island. He represented 5th Kings in the Legislative Assembly of Prince Edward Island from 1876 to 1879 as a Liberal.

He was born in Georgetown, Prince Edward Island, the son of Roger Dart Westaway and Damaris Watts, both immigrants from England. Westaway defeated Archibald John Macdonald by one vote in 1876 to win a seat in the provincial assembly. He was defeated by Macdonald when he ran for reelection in 1879. For a time, Westaway was a business partner of Malcolm MacDonald. Besides owning large ships and steamships, he also owned hotels, a foundry and a shipyard. Westaway died in Georgetown at the age of 64.
