= Emmeline Mary Tanner =

Emmeline Tanner
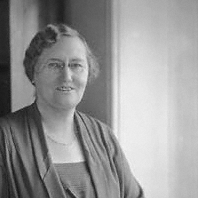
- by Lafayette in 1931
- Born: 28 December 1876; Bath
- Died: 7 January 1955 (aged 78); Marlborough
- Occupation: Educator
- Known for: Educational reform

Dame Emmeline Mary Tanner, DBE (28 December 1876 – 7 January 1955) was a British headmistress and educational reformer. She led several schools including Roedean. She was appointed a dame for her contribution to the Education Act 1944.

== Life ==
Tanner was born in 1876 in Bath, the eldest of seven children of Samuel Thomas Tanner (1849-1929), of 6, Leigh Road, Clifton, Bristol, a coal merchant and magistrate who worked with the Bath Board of Guardians, and Jeanetta ("Nettie") Jane, assistant in a "high-class draper's", and daughter of George Fry, of Lynton, North Devon, sometime grocer, farmer and "post-horse proprietor". Her younger sister, Beatrice Tanner, a nurse, was awarded the Royal Red Cross medal in 1919. Her parents, despite their wishes, could not afford to fund advanced education ad "money was never plentiful", although the family was happy, the children "from both parents things beyond price- regard for duty, generosity, a standard of values, a sense of fun".

She became a student teacher aged thirteen and spent her time teaching in private schools until she was employed by the Ladies' College, Halifax where she was trained. Tanner arranged her own education and submitted herself to the University of London where as an external candidate she obtained a first class history degree in 1904. The following year she was working at Sherborne School for Girls.

In 1908 she published a textbook on European history titled The Renaissance and the Reformation: A Textbook of European History 1494-1610.

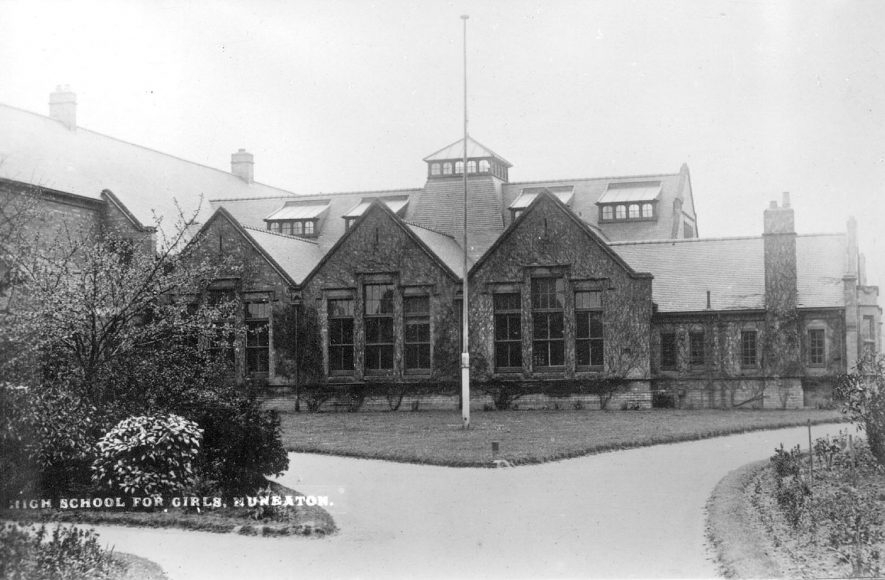
Nuneaton School in about 1915 during her headship

Nuneaton High School for Girls was founded in 1910 with the strong support of Warwickshire's Director of Education Bolton King. Tanner was the founding head. She enjoyed the support of Bolton King throughout her career and she joined Nuneaton's Education committee. She led the school in Nuneaton for about a decade and then she moved to Bedford High School where she again joined the education committee in addition to bringing reform to the school.

Tanner was poached from Bedford to lead Roedean School in 1924 by Penelope Lawrence, one of Roedean's founders. She joined the education committee in Brighton. She had already been one of the four women on the consultative committee of the Board of Education and as head of Roedean she was asked to serve on that committee for another six years.

Tanner was Chair of the Association of Headmistresses and later their President from 1947 to 1939.

== Damehood ==
She was made a dame for her contributions to drafting the Education Act 1944 as she had sat for two years on the Fleming committee which looked at public schools. The committee recommended that "opportunities of education in the public schools should be made available to boys and girls ... irrespective of the income of their parents."

== Death ==
Tanner died in Marlborough in 1955, aged 78.

In 1995, Tanner's great-niece Susan Major wrote Doors of Possibility: The Life of Dame Emmeline Tanner, 1876-1955, describing Tanner's emergence from a background of no great wealth or influential connections to rise to the top of her profession, assisting with the great developments in education that took place over her lifetime.
