= Brighton College Preparatory School =

Location
- Walpole Road; Brighton, East Sussex, BN2 0EU; England
- Coordinates: 50.8196°N 0.1197°W

Information
- Type: Private preparatory day school
- Motto: ΤΟ Δ'ΕΥ ΝΙΚΑΤΩ
- Religious affiliation: Church of England
- Established: 1845
- Local authority: Brighton and Hove
- Department for Education URN: 114621 Tables
- Headmaster: Ant Falkus
- Gender: Co-educational
- Age: 8 to 13
- Enrolment: 300
- Houses: 4
- Publication: BCPS Newsletter
- Website: www.brightoncollege.org.uk/prep-school

Brighton College Preparatory School is a private preparatory school in Brighton, England and is the junior section to Brighton College. The School teaches children from 8 to 13 years.

As of 2019, there were 523 pupils at the school.
