= B. M. Close's Ground =

Cricket ground in Southborough, Kent, England

- Interactive map of B. M. Close's Ground

Ground information
- Location: Southborough, Kent
- Country: England
- Coordinates: 51.156°N 0.253°E (approx.)
- Establishment: 1859

Team information
Kent County Cricket Club	(1867)
- As of 9 September 2010; Source: CricketArchive

B. M. Close's Ground was a cricket ground at Southborough in the English county of Kent. It was in use from 1859 to 1879, and hosted one first-class match in 1867. The site was later developed as part of a housing estate.

== History ==
The ground was established in 1859 by Robert Winnifrith on land owned by George Newnham of Horsemunden Farm, on Brightbridge Lane, Southborough. It is unclear who B. M. Close was. It was described by Bell's Life in London in 1862 as "one of the best cricket grounds in Kent". The first recorded match on the ground was in 1859, when a Royal Tunbridge Wells team played the New All England Eleven.

A cricket pavilion was built on the ground in 1860, and was used by teams from Royal Tunbridge Wells and Southborough in the early 1860s. In 1867, Kent County Cricket Club hosted a county match against Hampshire in the ground's only first-class or historically important match. The ground, which also appears to have been known as the Paragon Cricket Ground, was used for three matches between Southborough Cricket Club and the Gentlemen of Kent around the same period, but appears to have gone out of use soon afterwards, with Southborough matches transferring to Southborough Common.

The final recorded match there saw Southborough play a team of Surrey Professionals in 1879. In the 1930s, the site was probably to the west of the centre of Southborough. It was subsequently built upon, and a housing estate covers the general area of the ground today.

Cricket is played on the Common by the Southborough club. Their ground was used by Kent Women from 1957 to 1971, and remains in use. Kent played over 200 matches at the Nevill Ground in Royal Tunbridge Wells 2.5 miles (4.0 km) to the south, and 106 matches at the Angel Ground in Tonbridge 3 miles (4.8 km) to the north.

== Bibliography ==
- Milton, Howard; Francis, Peter (2020). Kent County Cricket Grounds. Worthing: Pitch Publishing. ISBN 978-17-85316-61-6.
- Milton, Howard (1979). "Kent Cricket Grounds". The Cricket Statistician. Nottingham: ACS. [ISBN unspecified]
- Milton, Howard (1992). Cricket Grounds of Kent. Nottingham: ACS. OCLC 949280131.
