= Bedford High School, Bedfordshire =

Coordinates: 52.13934°N 0.47186°W

Bedford High School for Girls
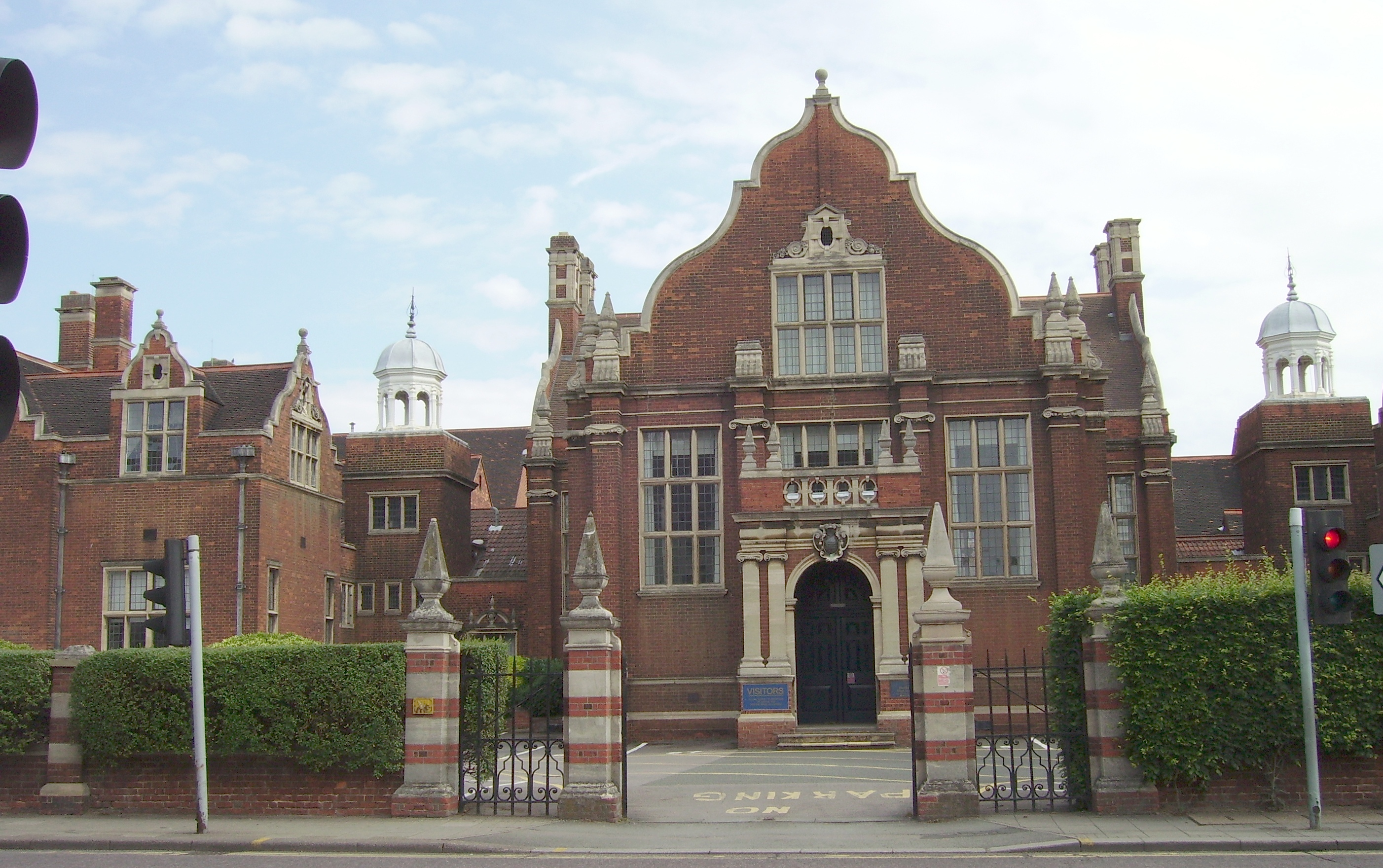

Location
- Bromham Road; Bedford, Bedfordshire, MK40 2BS; England

Information
- Type: Independent
- Motto: Alta petens (Latin for Aim High)
- Established: 1882
- Founder: Harpur Trust
- Closed: 2012
- Gender: Girls
- Age: 7 to 18
- Enrolment: 780+
- Houses: Beauchamp, Mowbray, Russell, St John
- Colours: Blue and green
- Publication: Aquila

Bedford High School for Girls was a private school for girls aged 7 to 18 in central Bedford, England. It was one of a number of schools run by the Harpur Trust. Founded in 1882, the school was located on its original site in Bromham Road until it closed in 2012, following its merger with Dame Alice Harpur School to create Bedford Girls' School, which is situated on the former site of Dame Alice Harpur School in Cardington Road.

Since 2012, the school buildings in Bromham Road have been occupied by Bedford Sixth Form.

== History ==
The school was opened on 8 May 1882. It was built on the site of former Harpur Trust cottage almshouses. Under the early headmistresses Marian Belcher, Kathleen Collier, Emmeline Mary Tanner and Katharine Westaway the school expanded. In 1924 Tanner moved to Roedean School and she was replaced by Westaway who was a classicist.

New school buildings encroached on the nearby houses of Adelaide Square and The Crescent, but never blocking the view of the fine Victorian architecture of the main building from Bromham Road. The original school at first housed both the "High and Modern School for Girls". Each school had its own half of the building, but by the end of the century the Modern School moved to premises of its own in the centre of the town, and in 1938 to its present site near the river where, from 1946, it became known as Dame Alice Harpur School.

The Junior School acquired a new wing in 1896, and remained there until moving into a building in Adelaide Square in 1985. In the 1890s the Main Hall was extended out towards the road so that it became T-shaped. It also obtained a pipe organ built by Norman and Beard of Norwich which was used for daily assemblies. Other notable changes included the gym built in 1931 which became a theatre, the acquisition of the former Trinity Church which was converted into a dining hall with classrooms above in 1981 and, most recently, in 2005, the new sports and performing arts complex with many facilities including a 25 x 13 m swimming pool.

By the turn of the century the numbers were above 600, at which level they stabilised until the late 1970s when again they grew, reaching around a thousand in the 1980s.

Sport in the early years of the school consisted of drill given by a sergeant. The gymnastic dress was made of heavy thick blue serge with a light blue sailor collar. Games only began when an asphalt tennis court was laid down in what became the playground. In 1900 the school acquired the field which is where the girls went to play games. The flourishing of the PE department owed much to the vision of PE teacher Margaret Stansfeld (BHS 1887-1918). Before its closure, the school had 22 acres (89,000 m²) of games field and a spa centre ('the Canary Cage'), formally opened in 2005 by past pupil Stephanie Cook OBE, (Olympic gold champion and World Champion in the modern pentathlon).

Music, Dance and Drama always played a large part in school life:

"Miss Belcher was keen on music, and arranged for five pianos to be placed in a large room, each enclosed in as many glass cases, and just big enough for a pupil and a music teacher. In this way, it was said, the girls would be able to practise in school without disturbing one another! It probably had more to do with making it possible for one mistress to chaperone the girls with their music masters. Bond-Andrews, the piano teacher, would have none of it: he dragged the first piano out of its glass case, wishing with all his heart for it to be suffocated. Harding was in charge of music for four decades: designing the new organ, and building up a music department with excellent orchestras and choirs. Today there are still those who remember the dreaded Joyce Harding, his daughter, who trained the choirs, and auditioned all junior girls at the beginning of each year. Those who could not sing in tune were labelled "ghosties" and were only allowed to mouth!"

This tradition of mouthing continued to the closure of the school. Musical alumnae include the soprano Agnes Nicholls (Lady Hamilton Harty), the clarinetist Dame Thea King, and more recently the soprano Alison Buchanan and cellist Naomi Williams.

King George V and Queen Mary visited the school in 1918 and complimented Collie on the way the girls curtsied, and Harding on the way they sang "God Save the King". On another occasion, in 1942, they sang the Yugoslavian national anthem. This was for the visit of Maria of Yugoslavia. A governor was heard to remark afterwards how clever the choir were to learn it in such a short time, and in a foreign language. They had, in fact, been singing the song in English.

=== Later history ===
Before closure about ten per cent of the girls attending the school were boarders, living in four boarding houses: Wimborne Grange, The Quantocks, Westlands and The Chilterns. Girls studied for GCSEs and A levels as well as the International Baccalaureate. In the last years the school took on a very multicultural character, reflected not just in the English language support given to the international students and the variety of Language A levels taken, but also in the social life: linguistic assemblies and fundraising days in which girls were sponsored for a variety of things, such as speaking all day in a language other than their mother tongue. In the sports department girls competed at county and national levels, and the hockey and lacrosse teams travelled to the Netherlands, Canada, Australia, and Prague.

=== Merger ===
In July 2009 the Harpur Trust announced its intention to merge Bedford High School with Dame Alice Harpur School, because the schools had seen a drop in pupil numbers over the years: In 1990 more than 2,000 girls were on the rolls of the two schools, but in 2009 there were only 1,500. In November 2009 it was announced that the new merged school would be called Bedford Girls' School, and would be located on the current site of Dame Alice Harpur School. The junior department of the new school opened in September 2010, when the junior schools of Bedford High and Dame Alice Harper merged on the Cardington Road site. The senior department of Bedford High School started to transfer to the new school in September 2011, with the full merger, including the sixth form department completed in September 2012.

In September 2012, Bedford College leased most of the site of the former Bedford High School for a campus in the north of Bedford town centre. The college later bought the old main school buildings, Trinity Church, and the Sports and Performing Arts (SPA) complex from owners, the Harpur Trust in March 2014. The college does not occupy the neighbouring accommodation such as former houses in Adelaide Square that were used by the school. The Bedford Sixth Form (which is Bedford College’s branding of its sixth form provision) now occupies the campus and the SPA complex runs under Trinity Arts & Leisure, managed by Bedford College Services Ltd.

== Headmistresses ==
- 1882-1882 A McDowall (d.1882)
- 1883-1898 Miss M Belcher (d.1898)
- 1899-1919 Susan Collie
- 1920-1924 Miss E Tanner
- 1924-1949 Miss K Westaway
- 1949-1965 M Watkins
- 1965-1976 E Wallen
- 1976-1987 A Kaye
- 1987-1994 D Otter (became D Willis)
- 1994-1995 M Churm
- 1995-2000 B Stanley
- 2000-2006 G Piotrowska
- 2006–2012 J. Eldridge (was J. Pendry)

== Exploits of Old Girls in wartime ==
Headmistress Katharine Westaway wrote a book detailing the activities and difficulties of old girls during World War II. So many of them did work that would have astounded previous generations: she quotes

"What do you mean to do when you leave school?"
"I am joining the A.T.S."
"What will you do there?"
"I want to be a gunner."[6]

Many of the girls joined the services: three joined the Air Transport Auxiliary: "These women used to check over the aeroplanes when they left the factories, certify them, and ferry them to the aerodromes from which they were to work, so they needed a theoretical and a practical knowledge of a very high order..."

Some of the girls were resident in the Far East and were subject to the horrors of war: their husbands became prisoners of war of the Japanese, or were killed, or they themselves were interned.

Many of the girls were at home, and even they were subject to bombing, in many cases being bombed out of their houses. They took on new duties in civilian life in support of the war effort; notable were those old girls whose administrative skills were put to work in arranging the evacuation of children, involving encouraging support from sometimes reluctant householders.

== Notable former pupils ==
- Dora Carrington, painter and member of the Bloomsbury Group
- Gladys Chatterjee, Lady Chatterjee, educator and barrister
- Stephanie Cook, pentathlete
- Jocasta Innes, author
- Sarah Pinborough, author
- Ellen Kate Limouzin, suffragist, Esperantist and actress
- Thea King, clarinetist
- May McKisack, historian
- Dora Metcalf, entrepreneur, engineer and mathematician
- Agnes Nicholls, operatic soprano
- Margaret Partridge (1891–1967), electrical engineer
- Rosemary Rapaport, violinist
- Ethel Shakespear, geologist
