= Brighton College =

Public school in East Sussex, England

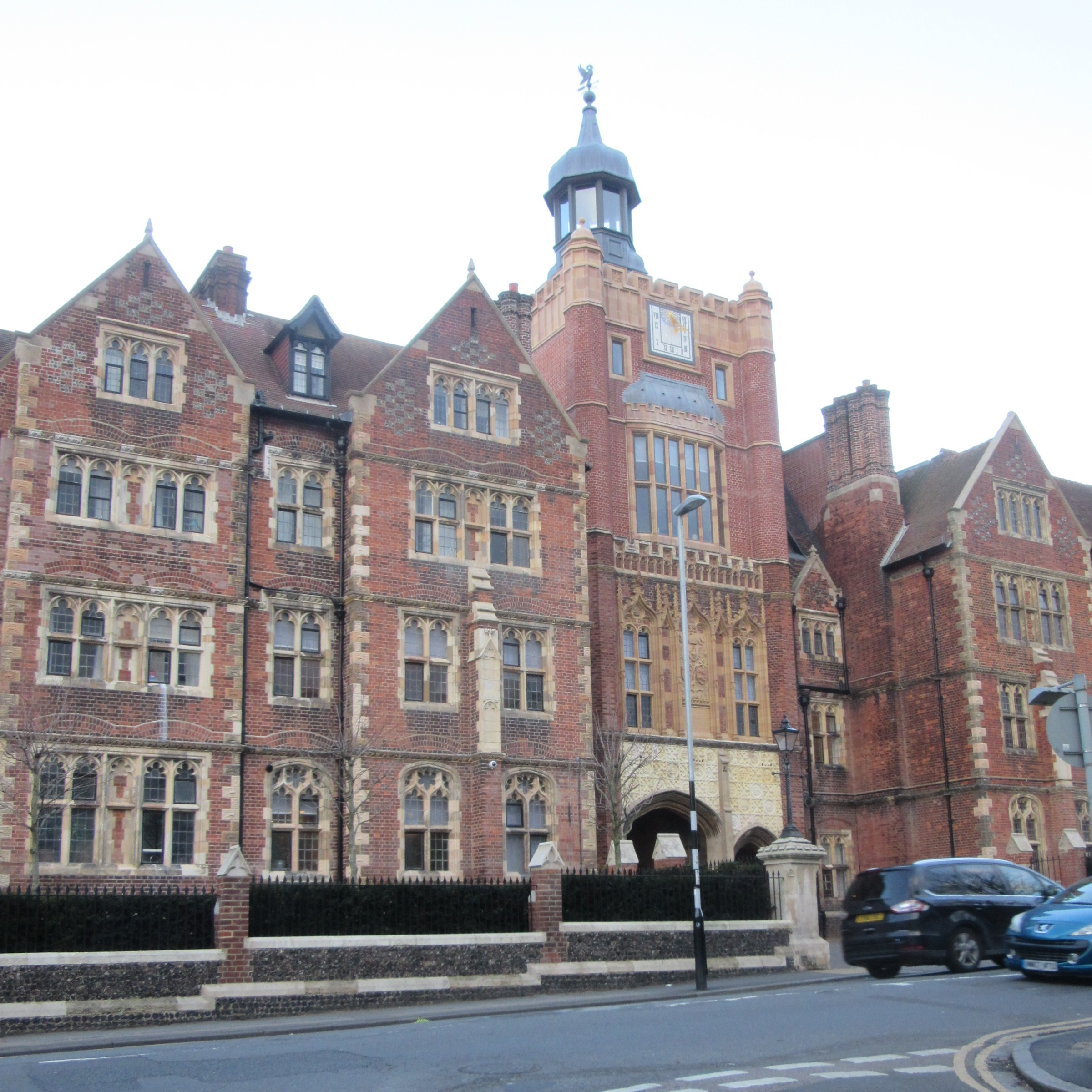
- Brighton College main entrance

Location
- Eastern Road; Brighton, East Sussex, BN2 0AL; England; 50.8196°N 0.1197°W

Information
- Type: Public School; Private day and boarding school
- Motto: ΤΟ Δ’ΕΥ ΝΙΚΑΤΩ (Let right prevail)
- Established: 1845; 181 years ago
- Founder: William Aldwin Soames (1787–1871)
- Local authority: Brighton and Hove
- Department for Education URN: 114614 Tables
- Chairman of the Governors: Lord Maude
- Headmaster: Steve Marshall-Taylor
- Principal: Richard Cairns
- Staff: 150
- Gender: Coeducational
- Age: 3 to 18
- Enrolment: 1088 (ages 11–18)
- Houses: 16
- Publication: Brighton Review
- Alumni: Old Brightonians
- Chaplain: Father Jack Dunn
- Website: brightoncollege.org.uk
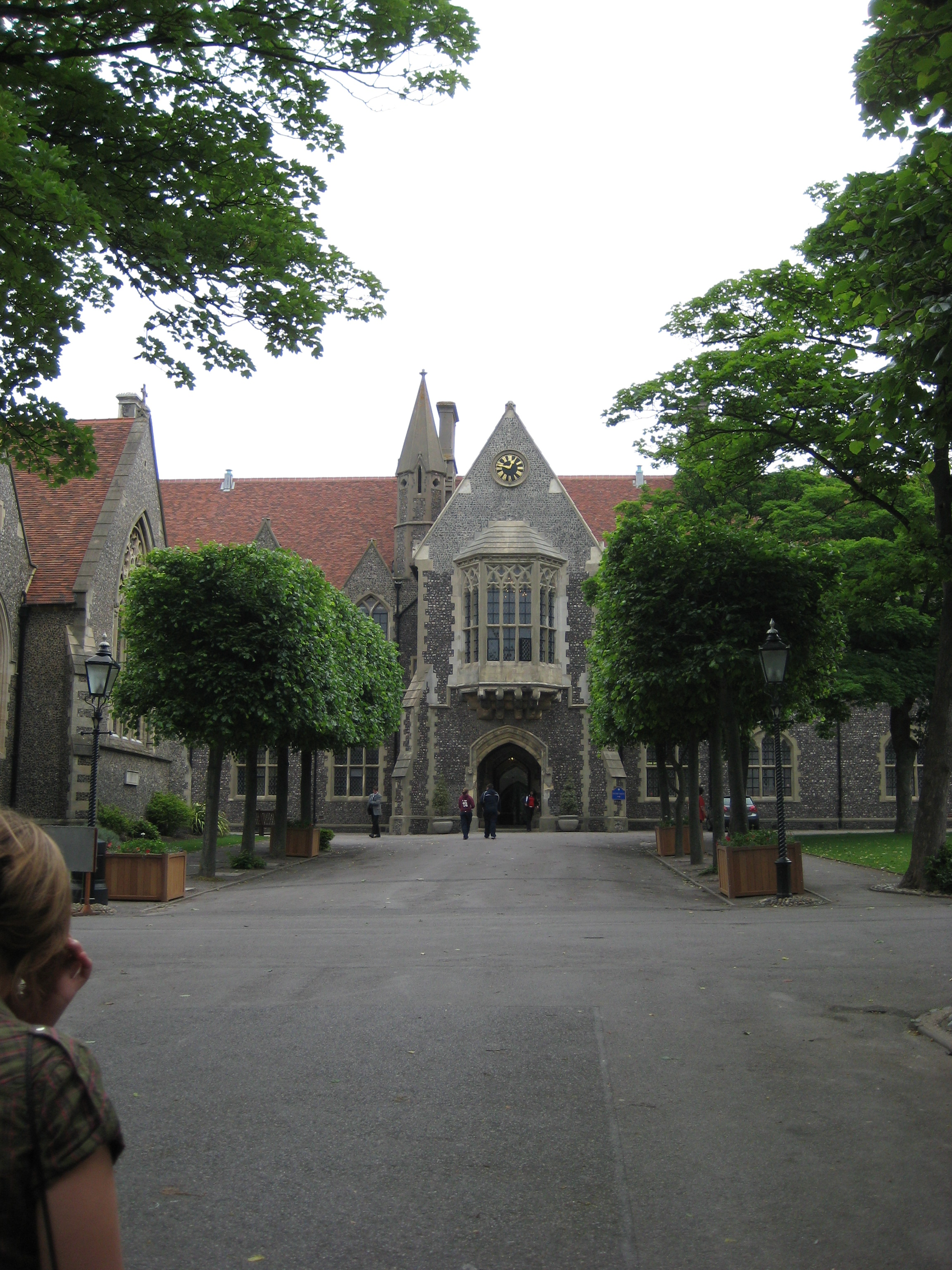
- The main building

Brighton College is a fee-charging, co-educational, boarding and day independent school for pupils aged 3 to 18 in Brighton and Hove, England. The school has two sites: Brighton College (11–18) and Brighton College Preparatory School (8–13). Brighton is known for its academic achievement, ranking first in the country for its A-Level results in 2024.

== History ==
Founded in 1845 by William Aldwin Soames, Brighton College was the first Victorian public school founded in Sussex. Soames originally planned for use of the Brighton Pavilion, but after refusal by Queen Victoria, the school was built in the suburb of Kemptown, Brighton.

Brighton College led the legal fight to secure the charitable tax status currently enjoyed by all registered charities. A long-running legal action between the school and the Inland Revenue from 1916 to 1926 produced a series of changes to tax law in the 1918 Income Tax Act, the 1921 and 1922 Finance Acts and, above all, section 24 of the 1927 Finance Act. The case (Brighton College v Marriott) went to the High Court in 1924, the Court of Appeal later that year, and ultimately the House of Lords in 1925.

In 2006, it became the first independent school to introduce compulsory Mandarin Chinese, and was the first public school in England to sign a deal with the Chinese government to encourage the teaching of Mandarin and Chinese culture.

Large numbers of Brighton College boys fought in both World Wars, with 149 Old Brightonians fallen in World War I and 173 during World War II.

During research for her 2006 novel Wicked!, author Jilly Cooper spoke to former pupils.

== Houses ==
The pastoral system at Brighton College is house based. There are 16 houses. Staff of both sexes can be attached to any house. Houses contain between 48 and 85 pupils and are supervised by a house master or house mistress (HMM) and a team of personal tutors. Boarding houses also have a matron and house keeping staff. The HMM appoints Upper Sixth Formers (Year 13) as house prefects to look after and mentor younger members, and one as head pupil to represent their house at house events and competitions.

In September 2017, Brighton College's 14th house was opened, Alexander House and is only for the Sixth formers, who decide during their Upper Fifth year (Year 11) if they wish to move into this house, with all members coming from other boarding houses. In their final two years, roughly half of boarders choose to enter the house. For years 7–8 there are two Houses, Hamblett and Owton. These Houses do not offer boarding and are for both boys and girls. For those wishing to board, Brighton College Prep Handcross offers boarding from Year 4.

== Academics ==
In 2024, it was ranked first in the country for A-level results, with 87% of grades A*-A. In 2025, 90% of GCSE grades were 8-9.

=== Awards ===
- England's Independent School of the Year 2012 – The Sunday Times
- England's Independent School of the Year 2019 – The Sunday Times
- Independent Secondary School of the Decade – The Times
- England's Public School Headmaster of the Year 2012 by Tatler magazine
- England's Public School Headmaster of the Year 2023 by Tatler magazine
- UK Boarding School of the Year 2025 – The Sunday Times
- Top School of the Year for A-levels 2025 – The Sunday Times
- Top Academic School in the South East 2025 – The Sunday Times
- Best Sixth Form 2025 – The Week Independent Schools Awards

In September 2025, Brighton College was shortlisted for the 2026 'Tatler Schools Guide', along with Eton, Caterham, Canford and Gresham's, as one of the five best public schools in the country.

== Site and buildings ==
Brighton College is located in Brighton's Kemptown area, in the east of the city. It is immediately to the east of the site of the former Kemptown railway station, across Sutherland Road. Its principal buildings are in the gothic revival style by Sir George Gilbert Scott RA (flint with Caen stone dressings, 1848–66). Later buildings were designed by his pupil and former student at the college Sir Thomas Graham Jackson RA (brick and flint with cream and pink terracotta dressings, 1883–87; flint with Clipsham stone dressings 1922–23).

George Bell, Bishop of Chichester created the school grounds as an extra-parochial ecclesiastical district. Placed outside the parish of St. Matthew's, Brighton, the school chapel holds an episcopal licence to perform weddings.

Under the stewardship of Head Master Richard Cairns, several new buildings were added to the college campus:-

- 2008: Alexander Arts Centre
- 2011: Skidelsky Building (winner of a RIBA award)
- 2011: New Pre-Prep school
- 2012: Diamond Jubilee Pavilion (winner of a RIBA award), a new cricket pavilion at the school's fields near East Brighton Park, opened by the Earl and Countess of Wessex in July 2012.
- 2012: Simon Smith Building (winner of a RIBA award)
- 2013: New House (winner of a RIBA award)
- 2014: Cairns Tower (winner of a RIBA award)
- 2015: Music School and Sarah Abraham Recital Hall (winner of a RIBA award)
- 2017: Alexander House
- 2017: Kai Yong Yeoh Building (RIBA nominee; Sussex Heritage Trust Award nominee)
- 2020: School of Sports and Science – a £55 million building, comprising 18 university-standard laboratories, a rooftop running track, swimming pool and double-height sports hall, was designed by the Rotterdam-based Office for Metropolitan Architecture (OMA).
- 2024: Richard Cairns Building – this building consists of a performing arts centre, the 400 seat 'Cairns Theatre', social spaces and subterranean studios. It completes a 15-year expansion programme and was designed by Dutch architecture firm krft.

== Sister schools ==
As of today, Brighton College has 10 sister schools world-wide, one each in Handcross, Hove, London, Abu Dhabi, Al Ain, Dubai, Bangkok (Krungthep Kreetha), Bangkok (Vibhavadi), Singapore and Hanoi.

== Policies ==
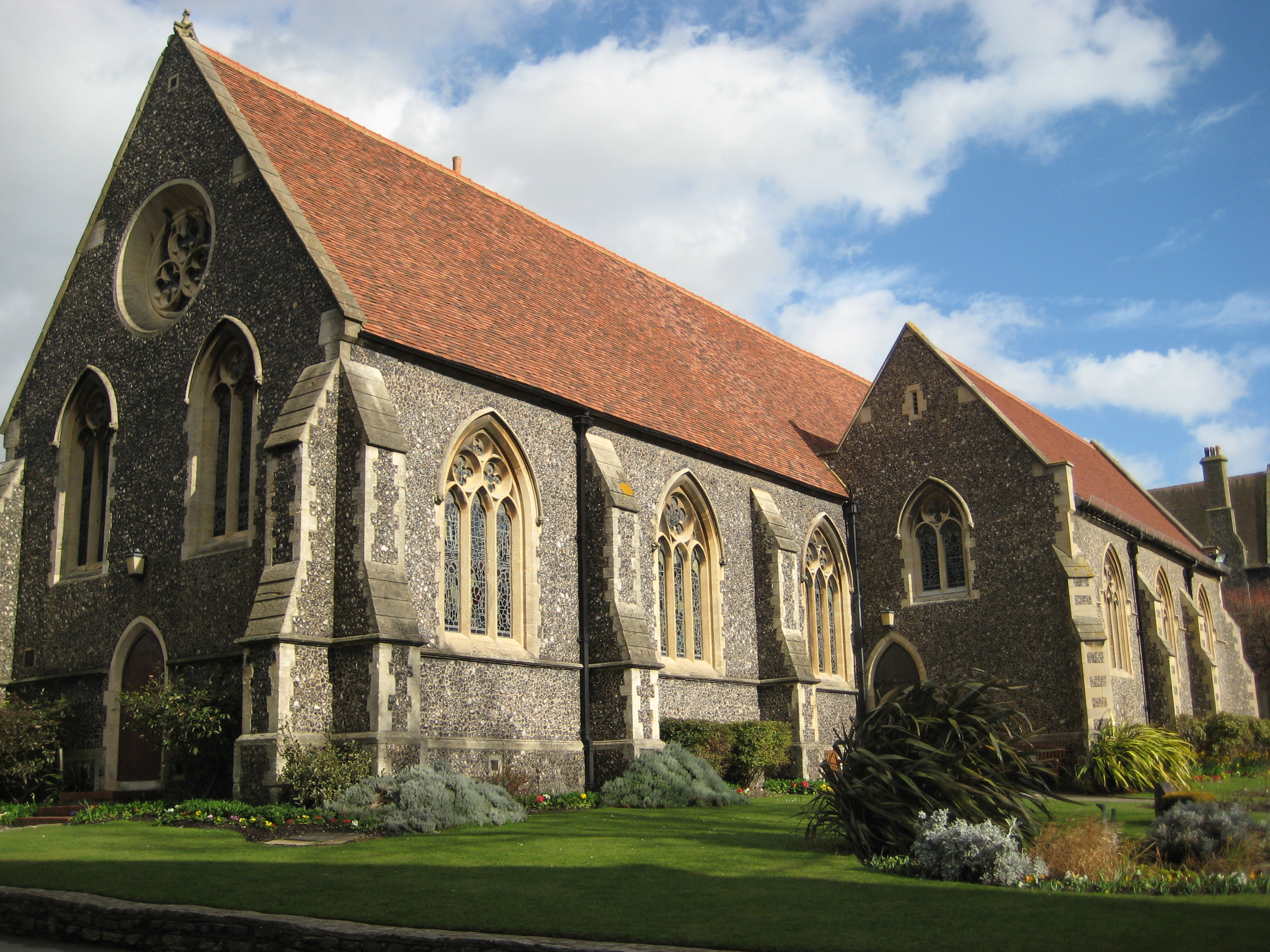
The College Chapel

In 2017 the school invited Stonewall Ambassador Ian McKellen to share its anti-bullying message. The school has regularly made headlines for its pro-LGBT stance, emphasizing the right of all pupils to feel safe and supported. For the 2013–14 academic year the school appointed the first openly gay head boy of an English independent school. In August 2017 the school participated in the Brighton Pride Parade, becoming the first public school in the United Kingdom to do so. The float was backed by Ian McKellen. This has become an annual event for the school, with pupils and staff designing and making the float.

The school positions community service as a "vital part of school life". Pupils are involved in 328 days of community service a year – which includes visiting elderly people, teaching pensioners about technology, and working with local community initiatives.

The school is recognised as having an ethos of kindness and respect, in addition to academic excellence. The school's most recent Independent Schools Inspectorate report summarizes:

Throughout the age range, pupils are exceptionally well educated in line with the school’s ambitious aims. The school is highly successful in preparing pupils for public examinations, as well as developing their breadth of knowledge and stimulating independent and enquiring minds. … Pupils show unusually high levels of knowledge, understanding and academic skills, appropriate to their age and ability. Results at GCSE and A level over recent years have been exceptional, and above the national average … Pupils of all ages show very high levels of spiritual, moral, social and cultural awareness and development. They are reflective, thoughtful and well behaved, possess a strong sense of right and wrong, and are conscious of the importance of social justice. They have a strong appreciation of tolerance [and] embrace diversity.

== Fees ==
For the 2024/25 academic year the fees were between £25,000–£35,000 for day pupils. Boarding ranged from £48,750–£61,000. The school offers a number of scholarships and bursaries, offered on the basis of merit and need.

== Activities ==
In the 2025 A-level examinations Brighton College achieved 98% A*B, with 85% A*-A and 49% A*. In the 2025 GCSE examinations they scored 98% 9–7, with 64% awarded Grade 9. Class sizes at GCSE average 18, and at A-level they average 8. 26 subjects are offered at A-level.

The school has an extensive co-curriculum provision, with the option of "over 100 clubs and activities" in which pupils may participate. This includes drama (with 15 productions a year), dance (7 styles of dance and 70 classes per week), music (22 music groups) and art.

The school has an ethos of "sports for all" and offers a range sport choices. The major sports are athletics, cricket, netball and rugby. All pupils participate in games of their choice twice a week. The college was selected to provide a training ground for Japan during the course of Rugby World Cup 2015. England Head Coach Eddie Jones later hosted elite player squad training camps at the college.

== Principals and head masters ==
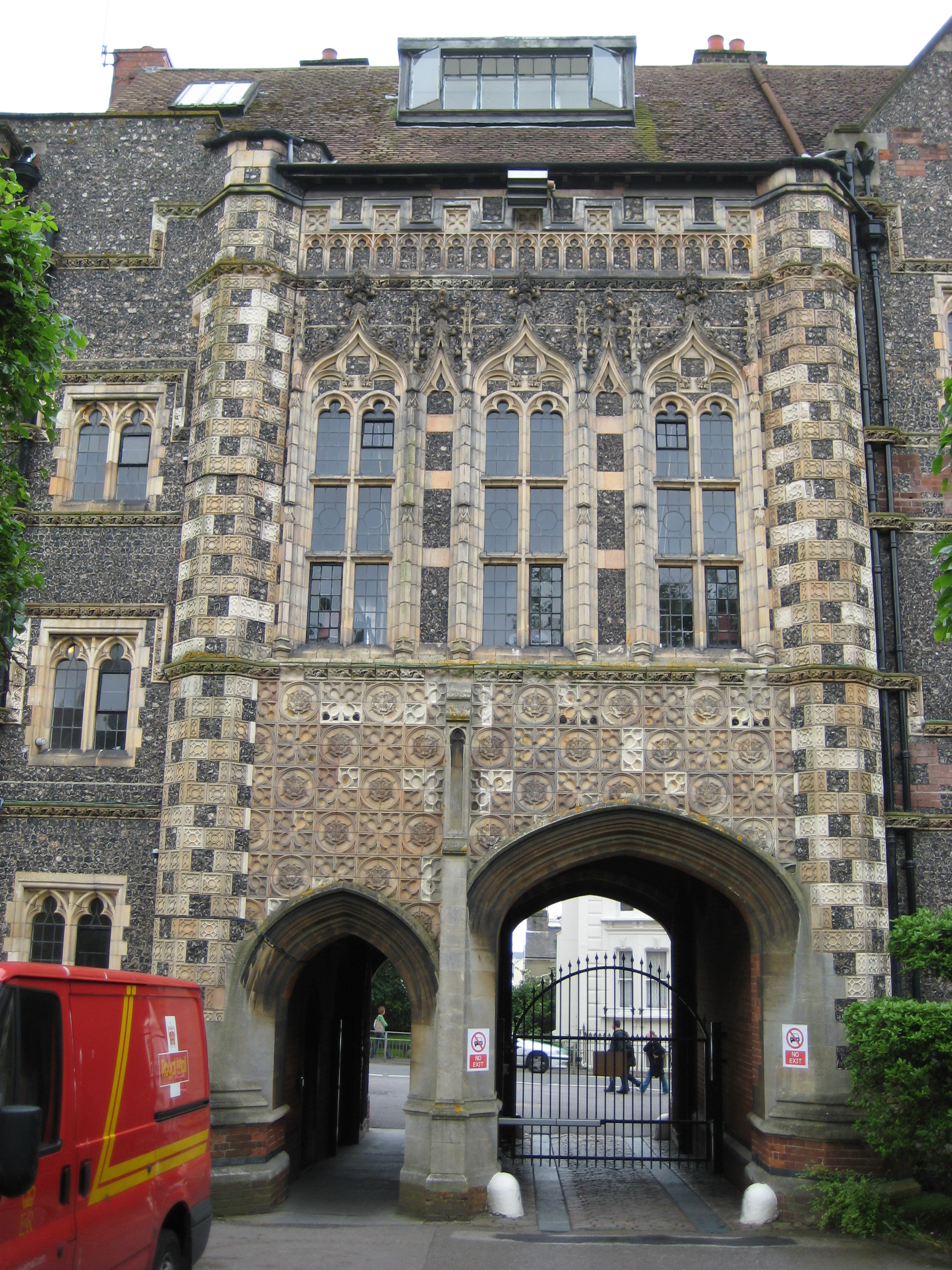
Brighton College Gateway arch and Head Master's Study, Dawson Building

- Rev. Arthur Macleane (1846)
- Rev. Henry Cotterill (1851), subsequently Bishop of Grahamstown and Edinburgh
- Rev. Dr. John Griffith (1856)
- Rev. Dr. Charles Bigg (1871), subsequently Regius Professor of Ecclesiastical History, Oxford
- Rev. Thomas Hayes Belcher (1881)
- Rev. Robert Halley Chambers (1892), formerly Principal of Victoria College, Jersey, subsequently Head Master of Christ College, Brecon
- Rev. Arthur Titherington (1895)
- Rev. Canon William Dawson (1906), formerly Headmaster of Corby Grammar School (now part of Tresham College of Further and Higher Education) and The King's School, Grantham
- Rev. Arthur Belcher (1933), a pupil 1886–95, son of Rev. Thomas Hayes Belcher
- Christopher Fairfax Scott (1937), formerly Headmaster of Monmouth School 1928–37
- Walter Hett (1939)
- Arthur Stuart-Clark (1944), formerly Headmaster of Steyning Grammar School
- Roland Lester (1950) (acting)
- William Stewart MC (1950), subsequently Master of Haileybury and Imperial Service College
- Henry Christie (1963), subsequently Warden of St Edward's School, Oxford
- William Blackshaw (1971)
- John Leach (1987)
- Dr. Anthony Seldon (1997), subsequently Master of Wellington College
- Simon Smith (2005) (acting)
- Richard Cairns (2006)
- Steve Marshall-Taylor (2024)

The title of principal was changed to Head Master in December 1885. The requirement for the Head Master to be an ordained priest of the Church of England was removed in 1909. Given the international growth of the school, Richard Cairns became Principal of the Brighton College family of schools in August 2024, and Steve Marshall-Taylor became the Head Master of Brighton College itself.

Note: Simon Smith returned to his position as Second Master after Richard Cairns took leadership in 2006.

== Affiliated schools worldwide ==
In 2010, Brighton College announced that it was "helping to set up schools in Abu Dhabi". This venture was a for-profit franchise operation through a company the school had set up, Brighton College International Schools Ltd, in a joint venture with a UAE property development company called Bloom Properties. Brendan Law, previously of Westbourne House School in Chichester, West Sussex, was named Headmaster of Brighton College Abu Dhabi in September 2010, and the school opened in September 2011. Law was replaced by Ken Grocott, former Head of Geography at Brighton College, in September 2012.

Brighton College went on to open affiliate schools in Bangkok in 2016, in Singapore with Cognita in 2020, and in Hanoi in 2023 in partnership with Vietnamese conglomerate Vingroup.

In 2023, the Prince's Gardens Preparatory School in London, UK was reopened as Brighton College Prep Kensington. It is owned by Cognita and is operated in partnership with Brighton College. This is the first time a leading independent school outside London has established a new prep school in the UK capital. The current Head of the school, Lois Gaffney, was appointed in 2022 from Brighton College Singapore where she was Deputy Head since 2020. The school teaches pupils aged 2 to 13 years old.

== See also ==
- Brighton College Preparatory School

== Bibliography ==
- G. P. Burstow, "Documents relating to the Early History of Brighton College", The Sussex County Magazine, October 1951 and August 1952.
- G. P. Burstow & M. B. Whittaker (ed. Sir Sydney Roberts), "A History of Brighton College." (Brighton, 1957).
- Martin D. W. Jones, "A Short History of Brighton College." (Brighton College, 1986).
- Martin D. W. Jones, "Brighton College 1845–1995." (Phillimore, Chichester, 1995) ISBN 0-85033-978-2.
- Martin D. W. Jones, "Brighton College v Marriott: Schools, charity law and taxation.", History of Education, 12 no.2 (1983).
- Martin D. W. Jones, "Gothic Enriched: Thomas Jackson's Mural Tablets at Brighton College Chapel.", Church Monuments, VI (1991).
- Jones, Martin D. W. (1997). "Edmund Scott and Brighton College Chapel: a lost work rediscovered" (PDF). Sussex Archaeological Collections. 135: 309–311.
- H. J. Mathews (ed.), "Brighton College Register, Part 1, 1847–1863." (Farncombe, Brighton, 1886).
- E. K. Milliken (ed.), "Brighton College Register 1847–1922." (Brighton, 1922).
- Anon., "Brighton College War Record 1914–1919." (Farncombe, Brighton, 1920). Compiled by Walter Hett.
