= Kathleen Doman =

English sportswoman and promoter of women's sport (1895 – 1988)

Kathleen May ‘Rosie’ Doman (1895 – 1988) was an English hockey player who helped establish the Women’s Cricket Association. She represented England in hockey and lacrosse and encouraged the formation of women’s cricket teams as well as working as a games teacher. Later, she worked for the Women’s Land Army.

== Early life and teaching ==
Kathleen was born in Westhoughton, Lancashire in May 1895 to surgeon George Doman. One of her brothers, Lieutenant George Ryder Doman, was killed in World War I. She was educated at St Leonards School, St Andrews.

After training at the Bergman Osterberg Physical Training College from 1915 to 1917, she was appointed to the staff there, and then to Roedean School in 1922, where she was a games mistress. She also lectured at Dartford Physical Training College.

== Sport ==
=== Hockey and lacrosse ===
An advocate for women’s sport, she provided hockey and lacrosse training in schools and at the Scottish Women’s Hockey Camp, and wrote several articles and a book on women’s hockey and lacrosse.

Doman played as a left back in hockey and gained a reputation as an impenetrable defender. She captained various local hockey teams and the East of England team before being selected to the All England Women's Hockey Association (AEWHA) national team in 1925. She captained England’s international team, including on its undefeated 1926 tour to South Africa, where she also gave training and lectures, and its 1928 tour to the USA. In 1938–9 she served as Chairman of the AEWHA Selection Committee.

She was also an international lacrosse player.

=== Cricket and the WCA ===
In 1926, Doman and some of her fellow hockey players held a meeting with the purpose of forming a central association for women's cricket. Doman formally proposed that ‘a central association for women’s cricket be formed’, a motion that was seconded by Molly Scott-Bowden and carried by vote. Doman was elected to the inaugural committee of the Women’s Cricket Association (WCA).

In 1930, Doman served as captain and opening bowler of a WCA team which helped the development of women’s club and school teams by playing against them across the country. Her team included future England players Betty Archdale and Amy Bull. She played as an all-rounder.

In 1932, Doman sat on the Umpire Subcommittee of the WCA to encourage women to train as umpires. In 1933, she provided coaching for 17 school teams in the Kent County Association.

== Later roles ==
In 1930, Doman accepted a position at Lillywhites, a sports retailer.

During World War II, Doman was responsible for clothing in the Women’s Land Army, and established a uniform of breeches and dungarees. She received an MBE for her work with the WLA. While at the WLA, she met Gertrude Denman, Baroness Denman, and became her personal secretary in 1946.

She died in May 1988.
