= Christabel Lawrence =

English teacher (1869–1952)

Christabel Lawrence (1869–1952) was an English physical education teacher who co-founded the All England Women's Hockey Association.

Christabel was one of fourteen children of solicitor Philip Lawrence. Three of her older sisters – Penelope, Millicent and Dorothy – founded Wimbledon House School, which later became Roedean School, in 1885 to help support the family.

Lawrence was one of the earliest students of Bergman Osterberg’s physical training college, graduating in 1887. She then became games mistress at Wimbledon House School. She also wrote and produced plays for the school.

In 1895, Lawrence represented Wimbledon House School at a meeting to set up the All England Women’s Hockey Association. She became the Association’s inaugural treasurer. She resigned her position in 1897 after suggesting to the President, Lilian Faithfull, that the Association was not being proactive enough but had ‘only organised existing hockey’, but was awarded honorary life membership.

In 1898 she married writer Leslie Cope Cornford.

She died in 1952.
