= Mary Scott-Bowden =

English hockey and cricket player (b. 1893)

Mary 'Molly' Scott-Bowden (née Logan, b. 1893) was an English hockey and cricket player who contributed to the foundation of the Women's Cricket Association.

She and her husband, Lieutenant-Colonel Jonathan Scott-Bowden, owned the Park Hotel in Colwall, Herefordshire, which they used for horse racing. Mrs Scott-Bowden, the founder of Colwall Ladies' Hockey Club, used the Hotel to host meetings of the Hereford Women's Hockey Association, of which she was vice-chairman.

In 1926, Mrs Scott-Bowden invited members of the All-England Women's Hockey Association to the Park Hotel for a cricketing holiday. In consequence, it was decided to establish an association for women's cricket. The Women's Cricket Association was founded in 1927, with Mrs Scott-Bowden elected to the board alongside her fellow hockey players, chairman Frances Heron-Maxwell and secretary Vera Cox. She and Cox captained teams at the Association's first annual Cricketing Week held at Malvern, Colwall.

Mrs Scott-Bowden captained the England women's team in the Association's first international match, a two-innings match against Scotland in 1932. She declared on 213 and England were victorious, despite strong performances from Betty Snowball and Myrtle Maclagan, who played for Scotland on that occasion but would go on to represent England in the first international women's Test series against Australia in 1934.

Mrs Scott-Bowden and her husband had one son, Major-General Logan Scott-Bowden.
