= Penelope Lawrence =

Co-founder of Roedean School, Brighton

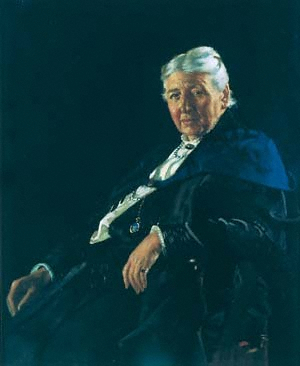
- Penelope Lawrence (in 1926) by William Orpen
- Born: 10 November 1856; Hyde Park, London
- Died: 3 July 1932 (aged 75); Boxmoor
- Education: Newnham College
- Occupation: teacher
- Known for: co-founder of Roedean School

Penelope "P.L." Lawrence aka Nelly (10 November 1856 – 3 July 1932) was a British co-founder of Roedean School in Brighton with her half sisters, Dorothy Lawrence and Millicent Lawrence.

== Life ==
Lawrence was born in Hyde Park, London. Her mother, Charlotte Augusta (born Bailey), died within three months of Lawrence's birth. Her father, Philip Henry Lawrence (1822–1895), was a solicitor who in the following year married Margaret Davies. Education had long been an interest in Penelope's family; her father's aunt was Sarah Lawrence who, like her mutual friends the Martineau family and writer Anna Letitia Barbauld conducted her own educational establishment. These connections continued thorough the decades with sisters Madeline (Lena) and Lucy Martineau boarding at Roedean in the school's early years at Wimbledon. Penelope's aunt, Frances 'Fanny' Bailey (1836-1921) had married Russell Martineau, son of James Martineau in 1861.

Penelope Lawrence's family lived in Wimbledon and in time there would be fourteen children. Her father, Philip, was overworked, and he took himself and the family to Freiberg in 1864 and then on to Versailles. From there her father returned to work, while the children remained to learn French. They returned to Wimbledon in 1865.

Their father decided to build a new house in Wimbledon while he became a barrister. Penelope had been to schools in England and France and now went with her family to Germany where she learned about the Froebel approach to education. The sisters went to day schools in Dresden and Gotha while the new house was built. In 1873 the new house was built and Dorothy went off to complete her education at Newnham College. One of her friends was Alix von Cotta who was to transform education in Germany.

Meanwhile her father's finances were failing, the new house was mortgaged, and the money was not available to send her sisters to Newnham. Dorothy went to Bedford College and Penelope paid for her half sister Millicent to attend teacher training at Maria Grey College. In 1881 Penelope succeeded Caroline Bishop running the kindergarten in Tavistock Place. Bishop had gone more training in Germany. Lawrence was at the Kindergarten until 1883.

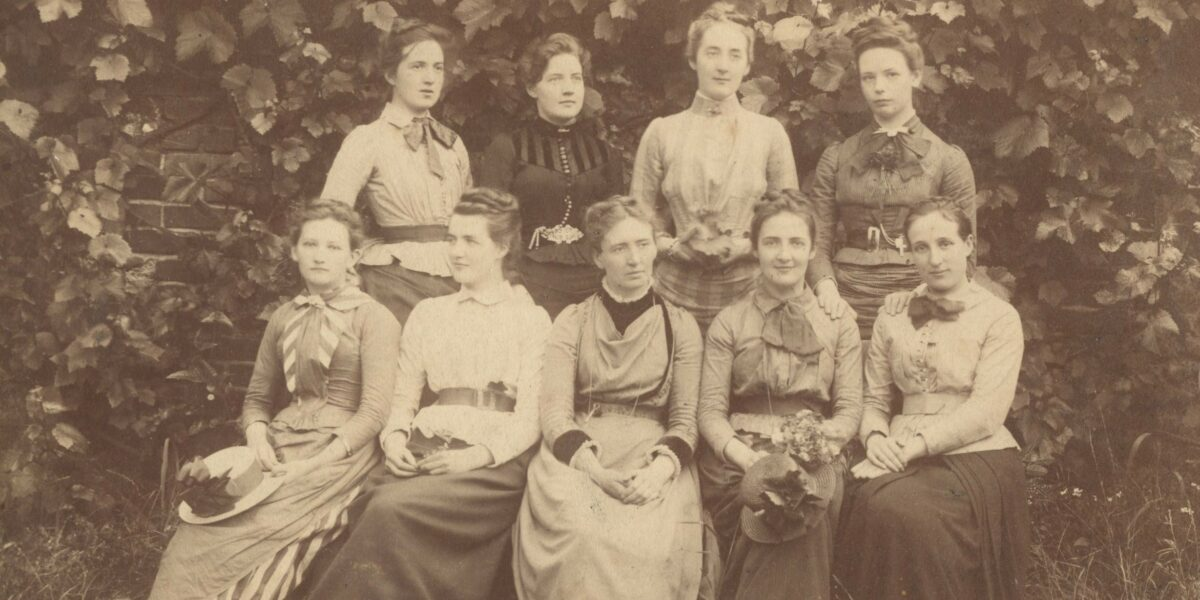
Wimbledon House staff in 1888 including the founding Lawrence sisters and Sylvia Lawrence who was the original Art Mistress

On Valentines Day in 1885 Dorothy Lawrence wrote to Penelope who was in Madeira. She and her sister Millicent proposed that the three of them should start a school. Dorothy, Millient and their mother had already been running a school for four years and they had outgrown the family home. The new school had six paying pupils when it opened at a house they had rented in Brighton. The school had another four pupils but they didn't pay, but "ten" was good marketing. The idea was successful and the school moved to Sussex Square and called itself Wimbledon House. Five of the Lawrence sisters were now employed in teaching where it was said that students had two or three hours exercise each day.

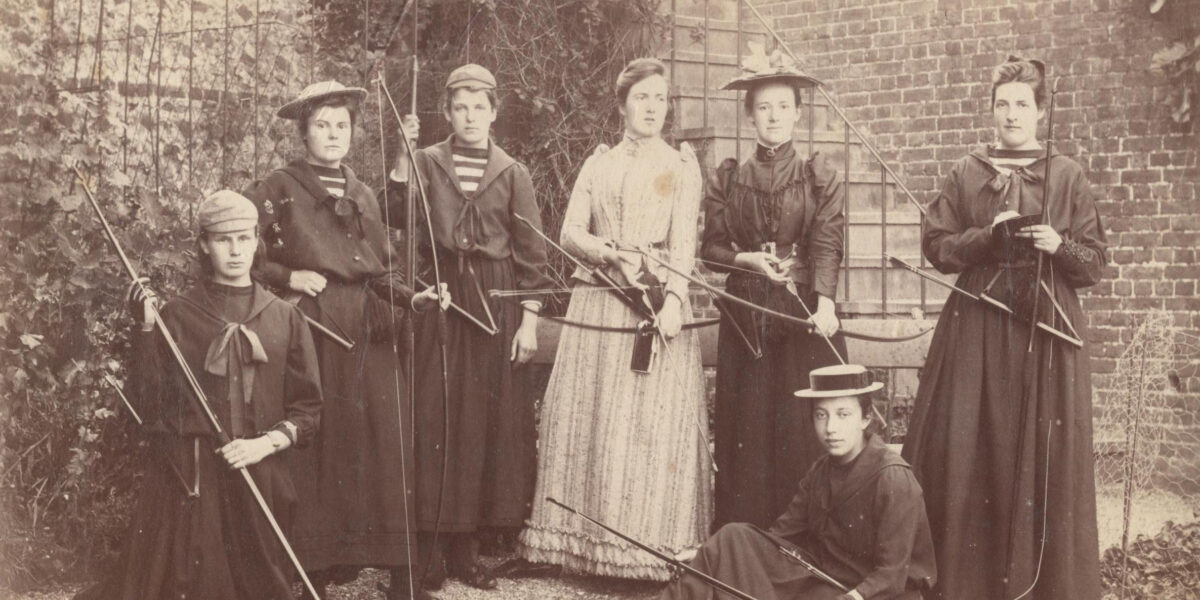
Archery in the 1890s: Millicent Lawrence is the central figure

Millicent Lawrence taught archery and Christabel Lawrence taught games at the school in the 1890s. She was a founding member of the Ladies Hockey Association and a life member of the All England Women's Hockey Association. She married the naval writer Leslie Cope Cornford.

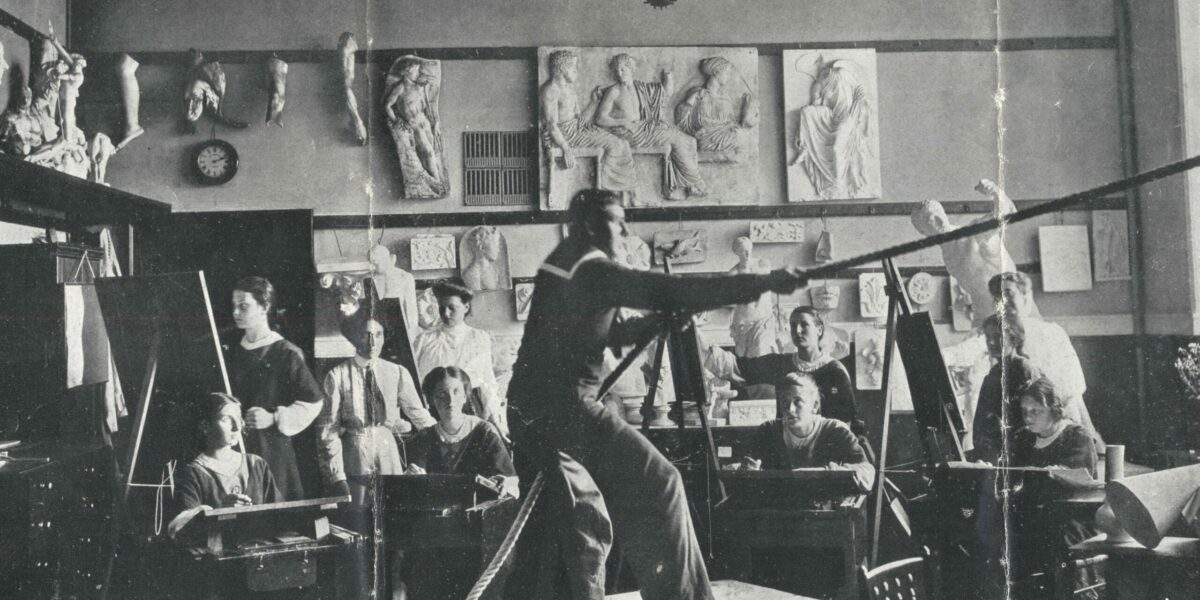
Roedean School Art class in 1907

In 1895 new premises were required and it was planned to build near Rottingdean. The family got behind the idea and their brother Paul invested £50 from his new job as a barrister. The new school was constructed between 1897 and 1899 and the growth to what was called Roedean was a step change. The new school was run on stricter lines more like a traditional boys school and each of the sisters took responsibility for a house. There was a triumvirate but Penelope was the lead.

In 1903 her youngest half sister Theresa Lawrence founded a school for the daughters of executives involved in gold mining in South Africa. This school still exists and is called Roedean School (South Africa). Theresa had been one of the first four children taught by Penelope at Wimbledon School when it was founded.

In 1924 the three founding sisters retired and Penelope had decided who should replace them and she head hunted Emmeline Mary Tanner to take place. Penelope's choice would continue to lead Roedean for the rest of her career.

Lawrence died at her home in Boxmoor in 1932. A Brighton and Hove bus is called the Lawrence Sisters.
