= Waddams =

Waddams may refer to:

== People ==
- Catherine Waddams (born 1948), British economist and academic
- Stephen Waddams (1942-2023), English-born Canadian jurist and law professor

== Places ==
- Waddams Grove, Illinois
- Waddams Township, Stephenson County, Illinois
