= Edith Clarke (disambiguation) =

Edith Clarke (1883–1959) was an American electrical engineer.

Edith Clarke may also refer to:

- Edith Clarke (anthropologist) (1896–1979), Jamaican anthropologist, legislator, and rights advocate
- Edith Clarke (cookery teacher) (1844–1926), British cookery teacher and writer
- Edith R. Clarke (died 1985), English field hockey and lacrosse player

== See also ==
- Edith Clark, French aviator and parachutist
- Edith Clark Cowles, American suffragist
- Enith Clarke, Australian pianist
