= Raphael Markellos =

British economist

Raphael Nicholas Markellos (born 8 November 1971) is a British economist, currently Professor of Finance at Norwich Business School, University of East Anglia and Distinguished Professor at Open University of Hong Kong's Lee Shau Kee School of Business and Administration. He has coauthored with Terry Mills the bestselling monograph "The Econometric Modelling of Financial Time Series" (by Cambridge University Press).

== Early life ==
Markellos was born in Leicester on 8 November 1971. He completed his undergraduate studies in economics at the Aristotle University in Greece and his PhD in finance at Loughborough University.
