= Edith R. Clarke =

English sportswoman (d. 1985)

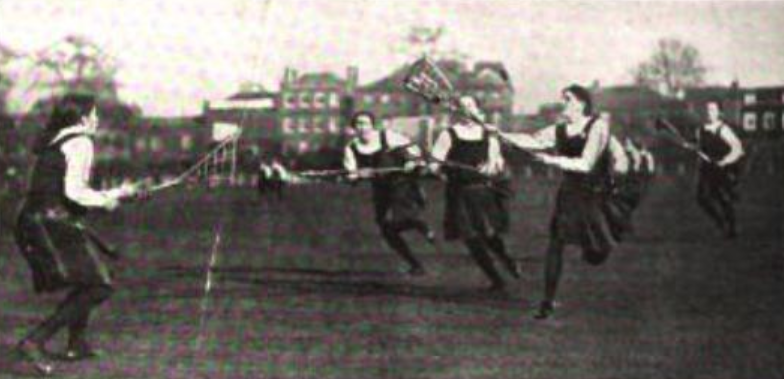
E.R. Clarke making a run for the English International lacrosse team against Roedean School and Others, 1914

Edith R. Clarke (often called E.R. Clarke, d. 1985) was an English sportswoman who captained the national teams in hockey and lacrosse. A teacher and national inspector of physical education, she advocated for the development of hockey in England and the USA and also served on the first councils for the Ladies' Lacrosse Association and the Women's Cricket Association.

== Early life and teaching ==
Clarke was the second daughter of Justice of the Peace Richard Feaver Clarke. She was trained at Dartford College in 1904–6 and joined the staff as a games coach and gymnastics teacher in 1911. In 1913, she trained to teach Dalcroze eurhythmics there. She also taught physical education at Roedean School.

== Sport ==
Clarke captained the English national team in hockey and lacrosse. She was also noted for her skills in athletics, tennis, swimming and dancing. In 1911, she served on the first council of the Ladies’ Lacrosse Association.

She was selected to play for the South of England hockey team for the 1909/10 season, and played for the English national team in 1911–1914. In 1919 she served as captain.

In 1921, she travelled to America with her teammate Helen Armfield for six weeks to help develop women’s hockey in the USA. She also contributed articles on hockey to the American magazine The Sportswoman.

In 1924, Clarke was elected to the inaugural committee of the Women's Cricket Association.

== Later life ==
In 1920, Clarke was appointed as one of His Majesty’s Inspectors of Physical Education for England and Wales.

In 1934 she was elected to the Executive Committee of the National Playing Fields Association.

She died in 1985.
