= Paul Ogden Lawrence =

British barrister and judge

Sir Paul Ogden Lawrence (8 September 1861 – 26 December 1952) was a British barrister and judge.

== Biography ==
He was the second son of Philip Henry Lawrence, solicitor, later barrister, of Chelsea, London; Susan Lawrence, the Labour politician, was his first cousin. Quentin Lawrence, the television director, was his nephew. Paul's sisters Penelope, Dorothy, and Millicent founded Roedean School; their Lawrence great aunts had been governesses and school teachers, mainly in Liverpool, earlier in the century.

Educated at Malvern College, he read for the bar at Lincoln's Inn and was called to the bar in November 1882, after which he practiced on the Northern Circuit. He took silk in 1896 and began a practice at the Chancery bar in London. He was appointed a Chancery judge in 1918, and chaired two committees on legal aid between 1919 and 1925. In 1926 he became a judge of the Court of Appeal, and was sworn of the Privy Council.

His father had done pioneer work in helping preserve the commons around London; Sir Paul carried on this work, especially with Wimbledon Common.

He married in 1887 Maude Mary (died 1947), daughter of John Turner of Oaklands, Wimbledon Park. They had no children.

== Arms ==
Coat of arms of Paul Ogden Lawrence
Motto Recte Faciendo Securus
