= Monica Pickersgill =

First President of England Hockey (1934–2026)

Monica Pickersgill (1934–2026) was the President of the All England Women's Hockey Association and the first President of the English Hockey Association.

== Early life and education ==
She was born Monica Horton in Barbados on 29 May 1934, the daughter of an English father, Howard Horton, and a Barbadian mother, Agatha, née Alleyne. The family moved to Sutton Coldfield when she was one. She was educated at Sutton Coldfield High School for Girls and the City of Worcester Training College. On 25 July 1956, she married Peter Pickersgill.

== Teaching career ==
Pickersgill worked as a teacher of physical education (PE) and English at West Park School, Leeds from 1953–5 and head of girls' PE at Mirfield Secondary Modern School, West Yorkshire, 1955–62. She then headed the PE departments at Greenhead High School, Huddersfield 1962–6 and Wakefield Girls' High School, West Yorkshire, 1966–70, and Colne Valley High School, Huddersfield, 1970–93. She was the founding president of North Schoolgirls' Hockey Association.

== Hockey playing and administration ==
Pickersgill played hockey for Dewsbury and Saville, Leeds and Wakefield clubs, and was selected to play for Yorkshire in 1960. She played for Yorkshire for 17 years, captaining the team for 12 of them. She also played hockey for the North, where she was elected as President in 1989, and was named as an England reserve in 1965.

In 1992, Pickersgill was elected President of the AEWHA. That year, she was one of a Working Party to investigate the possibility of merging with the Hockey Association. She delivered the AEWHA's centenary celebrations in Yorkshire in 1995.

The AEWHA merged with the Hockey Association to form the English Hockey Association in 1997. It was decided that the Presidency would rotate between male and female, and, uniquely among the sports organisations that merged in the 1990s, Pickersgill won the vote to become the first President. She faced several challenges during her presidency, including continuing to advocate for AEWHA staff in the joint organisation and the perception that playing hockey was unfeminine.

In 2022, Pickersgill received a Lifetime Achievement Award from England Hockey.

She died on 28 February 2026.
