= Mary Creighton Bailey =

British educator

- Mary Creighton Bailey, c. 1980
- Born: 19 September 1913; Headington, Oxford, England
- Died: 16 August 2008 (aged 94); Aldbourne, Wiltshire, England
- Education: Lady Margaret Hall, Oxford
- Occupations: Adviser to British high commissioner, Berlin; Headmistress of Simon Langton Girls' Grammar School, Canterbury; Teacher of classics at Roedean School and in Bristol
- Years active: 1939–1974

Mary Creighton Bailey (19 September 1913 – 16 August 2008) was an English classics scholar and teacher, and headmistress of Simon Langton Girls' Grammar School, Canterbury, for fourteen years.

After the Second World War, and interrupting her teaching career, Bailey was flown into Berlin as adviser to the British high commissioner there, with a remit to improve education services. As religious affairs officer in Berlin, she worked with the Evangelical Church of Westphalia. For her work in Germany she was awarded the Bundesverdienstkreuz 1. Klasse, or Order of Merit First Class of the Federal Republic of Germany.

== Background ==
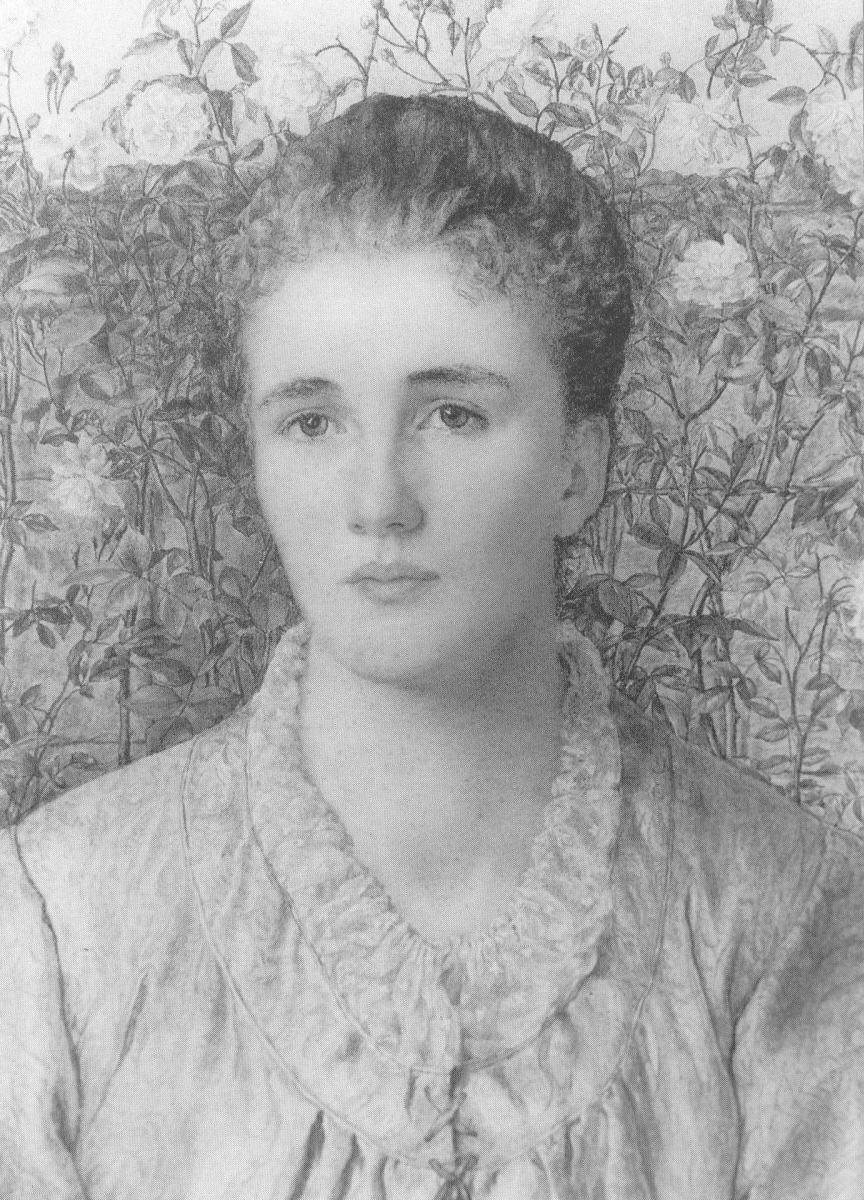
Louise Creighton, by Bertha Johnson

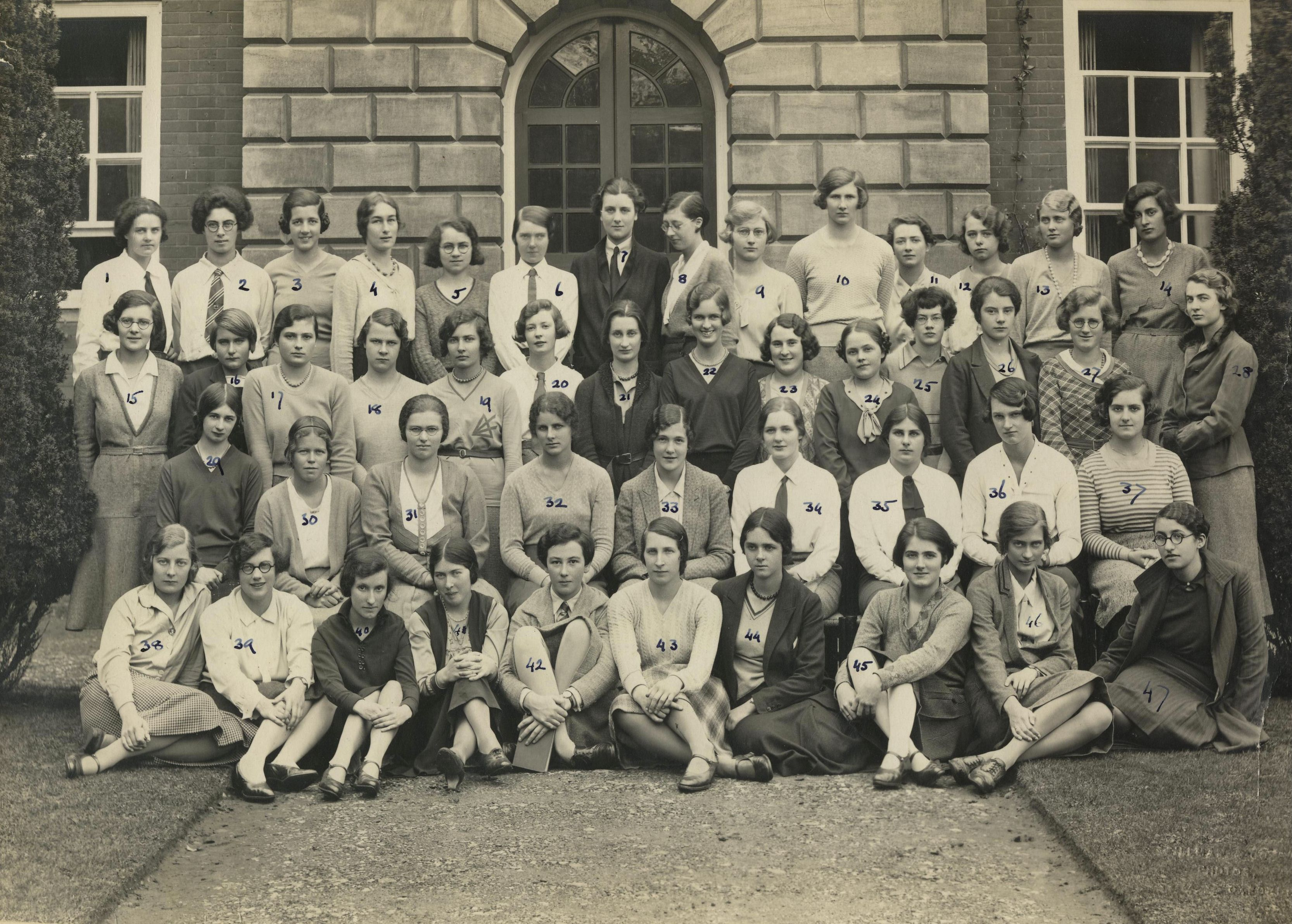
Lady Margaret Hall matriculation photo, 1931. Bailey is no.16

Bailey was a member of a family of Oxford academics. Her paternal grandfather was barrister Alfred Bailey, a Stowell civil law fellow of University College, Oxford. Her maternal grandfather was Mandell Creighton, a fellow of Merton College, Oxford. Her maternal grandmother was Louise Creighton, (Note: Louise Hume Creighton (7 July 1850 – 15 April 1936). GRO index: Births Sep 1850 Von Glehn Louisa Hume Lewisham V 320. Deaths Jun 1936 Creighton Louise H. 85 Oxford 3a 1361. Her portrait by Walter Stoneman (died 1958) is here.) who was an alumnus of the University of London and a governor of Lady Margaret Hall, Oxford, serving on its council between 1906 and 1936. Bailey's father was the Oxford don and classicist Cyril Bailey, and her cousin was the classical scholar Sir Walter Leaf. (Note: Cyril Bailey (13 April 1871 – 5 December 1957). There is a portrait of him in the National Portrait Gallery, London, here.) Her mother was Gemma Creighton, (Note: Gemma Creighton (1887 – 23 September 1958) GRO index: Births Sep 1887 Creighton Gemma Worcester 6c 269. Marriages Mar 1912 Creighton Gemma and Bailey Cyril. Kingston 2a 318a (Note: newspapers quote the marriage date variously from 1 to 3 January 1912). Deaths Sep 1958 Bailey Gemma 71 Wantage 6a 136.) who was a daughter of Bishop of London Mandell Creighton, and an alumnus and historian of Lady Margaret Hall. Her parents married in January 1912, at the Chapel Royal, Hampton Court Palace, where Louise Creighton had an apartment.

Bailey was born on 19 September 1913, in Headington, Oxford. (Note: Mary Creighton Bailey (19 September 1913 – 16 August 2008). GRO index: Births Sep 1913 Bailey Mary. Mother Creighton. Headington 3a 2134. Her birth certificate says: Headington, County of Oxford. Birth nineteenth September 1913. 7 (or 1) Banbury Road, St Giles, Oxford. Mary, daughter of Cyril Bailey and Gemma Bailey formerly Creighton. Father: fellow of Balliol College. Informant: Cyril Bailey, father, 7 (or 1) Banbury Road, Oxford.) She was the eldest of four siblings, who included Balliol student John Mandell Bailey, (Note: John Mandell Bailey (21 August 1915 – 1993). GRO index: Births Sep 1915 Bailey John M Creighton Headington 3a 1897. Deaths 1993 Bailey John Mandle (sic) 21AU1915 Islington 2381B 125.) author Rachel Margaret Moss née Bailey, wife of Reverend Basil Moss, (Note: Rachel Margaret Bailey (15 January 1920 – 2006). GRO index: Births Mar 1920 Bailey Rachel M. Creighton Oxford 3a 2555) and Susan Bailey, an alumnus of Lady Margaret Hall. (Note: Susan Bailey (1936 – 16 August 2008). GRO index: Births Jun 1926 Bailey Susan Creighton Oxford 3a 1747) The siblings were "brought up in an intellectually rigorous atmosphere". She attended the Dragon Preparatory School for Boys, with her siblings, and then Oxford High School. She gained a scholarship to Oxford University, and between 1931 and 1933 she studied greats and gained her Master of Arts (M.A.) in 1952 at Lady Margaret Hall, where her father was chairman of the college council and an honorary fellow.

=== Character ===
Bailey's niece recalled that Bailey's "quiet and steady determination held throughout her professional life". The actor Michael Denison said that:

Mary ... a brilliant scholar like [her father] ... was formidable, not because she showed off her intellectual gifts — beyond occasionally cracking private jokes with her father in Ancient Greek — but because of her shyness and long silences, which seemed to demand profound contributions to the conversation.

== Career ==
=== Roedean School ===
Bailey's first academic position was the teaching of classics at Roedean School in Sussex. The school, with Bailey in post, was evacuated to Keswick, Cumbria, during the Second World War.

=== British High Commission, Germany ===
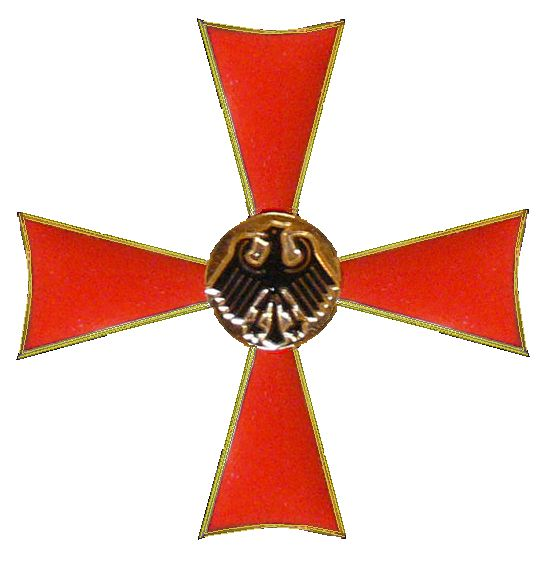
Bundesverdienstkreuz 1. Klasse

In September 1945 Bailey, a fluent speaker of German, moved to Berlin, having joined the Education Division of the Control Commission for Germany. According to her niece Gemma Moss, the brief was to "de-nazify the school curriculum". She was "the first woman to be flown into Berlin after the Second World War with the remit to improve education services in Germany". From 1951 she was an adviser to the British high commissioner in Germany, Sir Ivone Kirkpatrick, and was also the religious affairs officer for Bonn, for the Central Commission for Germany. She would fraternise with her German colleagues at a time when that was not common practice at the Commission. There are letters from Bailey in the archives of the Evangelical Church of Westphalia. In 1952 she received the award Bundesverdienstkreuz 1. Klasse, or Order of Merit First Class of the Federal Republic of Germany.

[It was] the only Federal decoration of Germany and only awarded to a tiny minority of women since its inauguration in 1951, "for achievements that served the rebuilding of the country in the fields of political, socio-economic and intellectual activity".

=== Bristol ===
After Bailey's return from Germany, she taught classics at Kingsfield School, Bristol, which was at that time a co-educational grammar school, from 1953 to 1960.

=== Simon Langton Girls' Grammar School ===
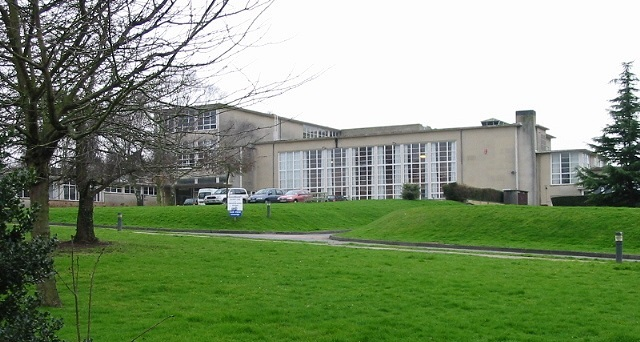
Simon Langton Girls' Grammar School, in 2007

Between 1960 and her retirement in 1974, Bailey was the fifth headmistress of Simon Langton Girls' Grammar School, Canterbury. On her watch, there were schemes for "branching out", "individualism", and "innovation and progress". This involved the inclusion of the school in The Nuffield Science Project which meant building a new biology laboratory, digging a pond, the formation of a natural history society and some weighty text books. She introduced history projects, geography field work abroad, a modern languages oral programme, and the introduction of sociology, politics, General Studies, and economics as school subjects, besides options to mix the sciences and the arts as sixth form subjects, and new facilities for sixth-form study and socialising.

Bailey encouraged concerts and plays, and, following the 1964 retirement of Miss H. L. White, (Note: Miss H.L. White, L.T.C.L, A.L.A.M.) hired a full-time music teacher. She began plans for a new music block at the school, which was completed in 1980 and opened by her after her retirement. She expanded the scope of physical education with the opening of a swimming pool in 1964, and foreign school trips became frequent, with groups travelling in Europe and as far as Russia. When she retired, and in accordance with a trend of the era, she insisted that the job would be offered to both men and women, and indeed a headmaster was chosen. "Individuals mattered to her – saint or sinner – and individuality was respected. Her breadth of vision, humanity and integrity sprang from her deeply held beliefs".

== Institutions ==
Between 1967 and 1968, Bailey was president of the Canterbury branch of the Soroptimists.

=== Death ===
Bailey retired to Aldbourne, Wiltshire, where she lived with her sister Susan, who cared for her in her last illness. She died on 16 August 2008 aged 94 years, at Aldbourne Nursing Home, Aldbourne, on the same day as her sister, who by that time had become ill herself. She bequeathed to Lady Margaret Hall the above watercolour painting by Bertha Johnson of her maternal grandmother Louise Creighton.
