= Isabella Jameson =

English teacher

Isabella Jameson (b. 1866) was an English teacher who co-founded the All England Women’s Hockey Association.

The daughter of Reverend Francis Jameson, Isabella was educated at Miss Brice’s School in Weston-Super-Mare and then studied mathematics at Newnham College, Cambridge in 1890–3.

A member of the Newnham College Hockey Club, Jameson took part in a hockey-playing trip to Dublin in January 1895 against the Irish Ladies' Hockey Union. She then contacted school, university and local women’s hockey clubs to arrange setting up an English equivalent. This became the Ladies’ Hockey Association, renamed the All-England Women’s Hockey Association in 1896. Jameson served as the inaugural vice-president.

Jameson became a teacher at Winchester High School.
