= Mary Russell Vick =

Field hockey player and administrator from Guernsey

Mary Russell Vick OBE (1922–2012) was an English mathematician, field hockey player, and administrator. She won Oxford Blues in several sports and toured the US as part of the England Hockey team. She was President of the All England Women's Hockey Association. She was the first chair of the Great Britain Women's Olympic Hockey Board.

== Career ==
Russell Vick (née de Putron) was born on 16 July 1922 in Guernsey. Her father held the office of Jurat of the Royal Court of Guernsey and was in charge of food and fuel on the island during the wartime occupation. She was sent to boarding school in Bexhill, where her aunt had a school. She excelled at all sports from an early age, playing in the junior tennis championships of Great Britain at Wimbledon in 1938. She played for the University of Oxford hockey team for four seasons whilst studying Mathematics at Somerville College between 1940 and 1943. She won further Blues in lawn tennis, cricket and squash and also excelled at athletics.

From 1946 she played hockey for Sussex and in January 1947 she was selected to play territorial hockey for the South. Shortly afterwards she was selected to play for the England women's hockey team. That team toured the US in 1947. Fellow players were Bridget and Barbara Winifred West. Known for her athleticism and style on the pitch, she was a prolific goal scorer; scoring 70 goals in 30 international matches until her retirement in 1953.

Vick later served as president of the All England Women's Hockey Association from 1976 to 1986. She was the first chair of the Great Britain Women's Olympic Hockey Board. She was appointed an OBE for services to hockey administration in 1980.
