= Barbara Calder =

British yachtswoman (1924–2018)

Barbara Calder (19 July 1924 – 27 January 2018) was a pioneering British yachtswoman.

She was born Barbara Brydone in London on 19 July 1924, the daughter of James "Robin" Marr Brydone a doctor and his wife Mary "Mamie" Brydone née Birch. Her father was named after his grandfather the Scottish surgeon, James Marr Brydone, who served at the Battle of Trafalgar in 1805, and was the first to sight the enemy's main fleet.

She was educated by a governess at home, before being a boarder at Roedean School, East Sussex.

Calder was the first to captain an all-women crew in the Tall Ships' Races.

She married Norman Calder, a Scottish doctor, and they had three sons.
