= Hilda Light =

Hilda M Light (1890–1967) was a pioneering sportswoman in the 1920s. She captained the England women's hockey team and served as President of the All England Women's Hockey Association (AEWHA).

== Career ==
Light played in the South Hampstead High School hockey team before being selected to play right half for Pinner and for Middlesex in 1909.

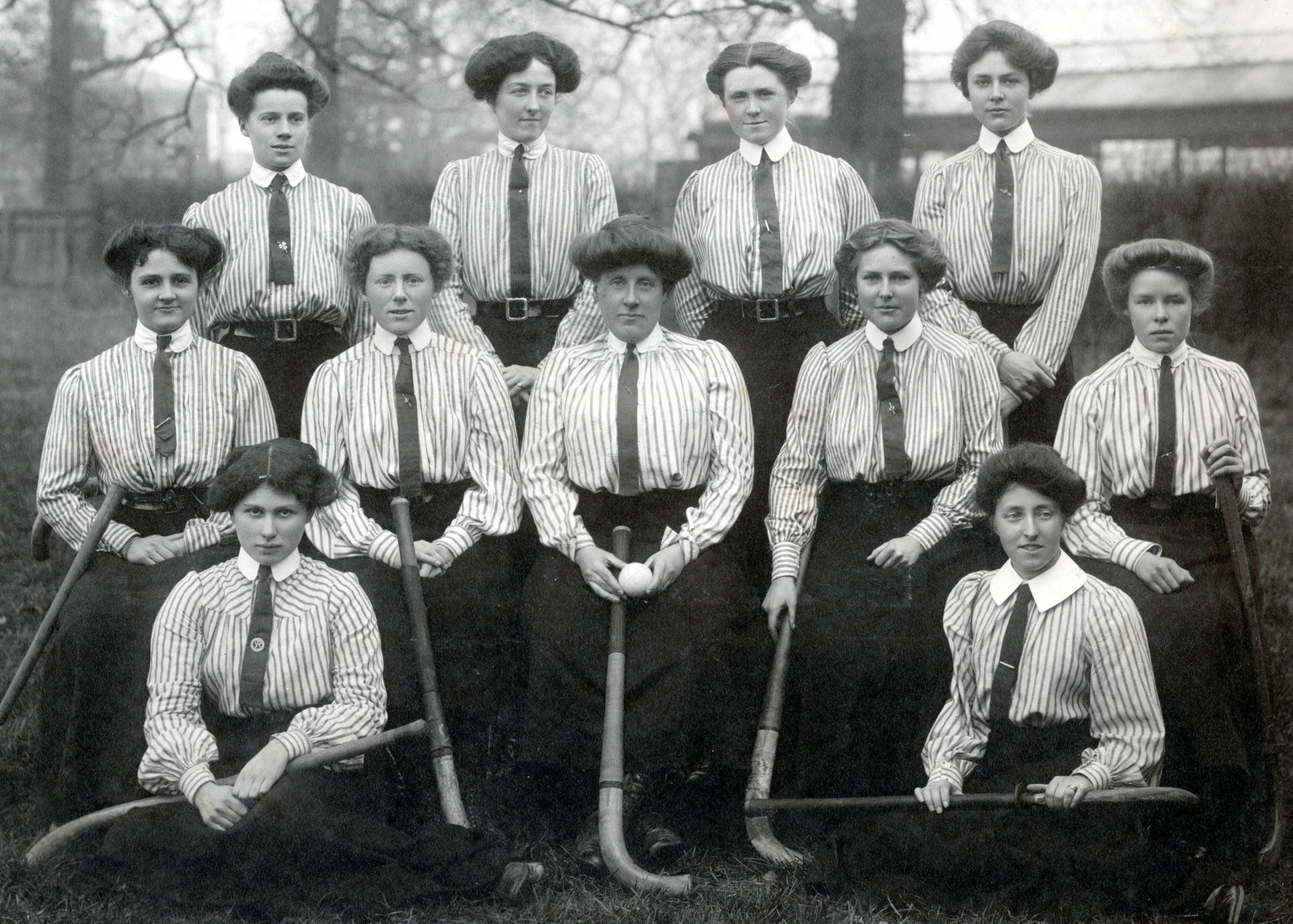
Black and white photographic print showing members, including Hilda M Light, of the Middlesex women's hockey team, 1910/1911.
