= Sarah Madeleine Martineau =

- Born: 2 May 1872; Clapham, London, England
- Died: 28 September 1972 (aged 100)
- Education: Roedean School, Westminster School of Art
- Occupations: Artist and jeweller
- Movement: Arts and Crafts movement
- Family: Martineau family Sydney Martineau

Sarah Madeleine Martineau (2 May 1872 – 28 September 1972) was a British artist and a successful Arts and Crafts jeweller.

== Life ==
Sarah Madeleine Martineau (known as Lena) was born on 2 May 1872 in Clapham, London, to Unitarians David and Sarah Martineau. David Martineau was a senior partner in a firm of sugar refiners, and a prominent Liberal. Sarah likely remained living in the family home with her two unmarried sisters into the 1940s, after which the three lived with or near each other in South London for the remainder of their lives.

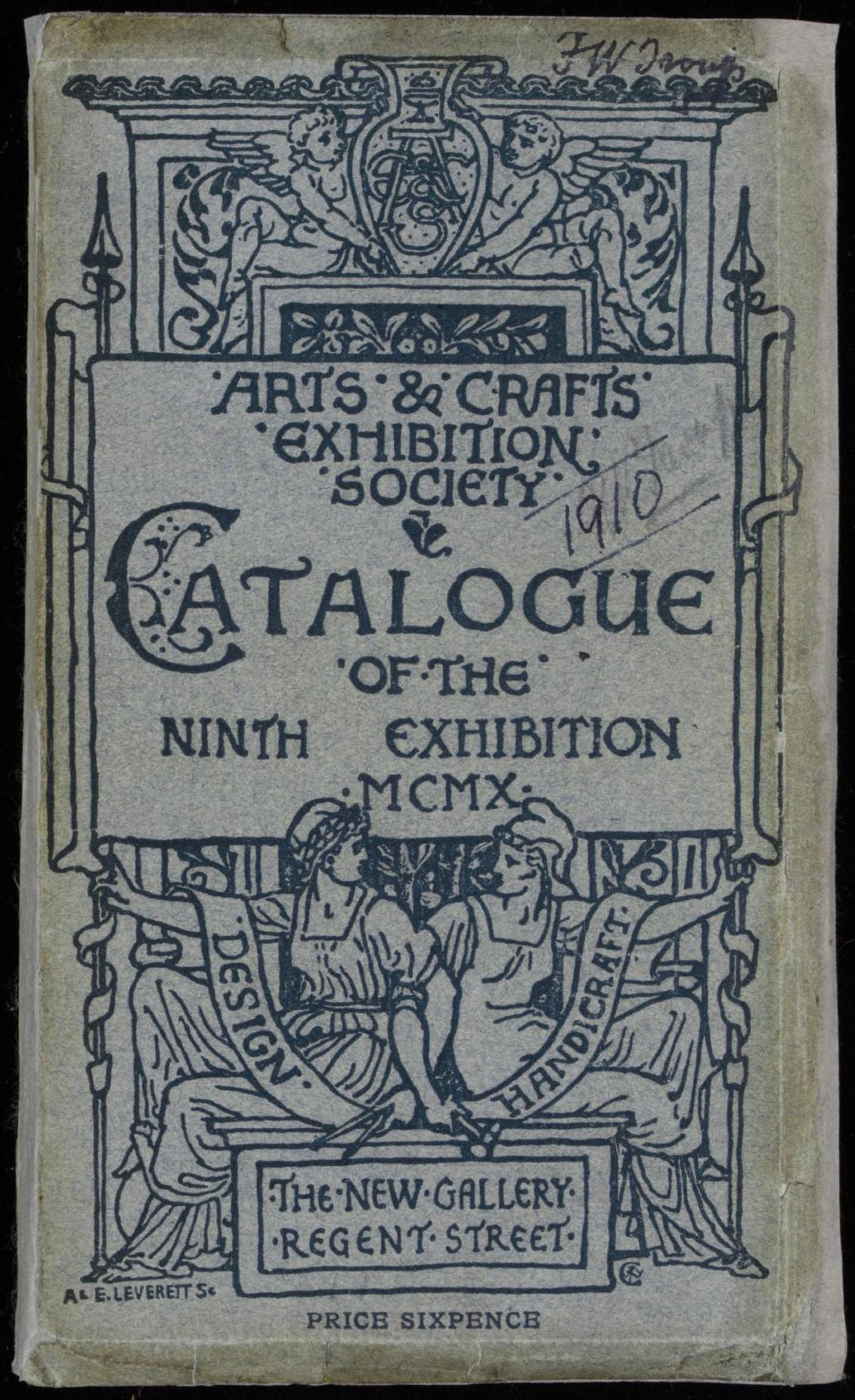
Catalogue of the Arts & Crafts Exhibition Society exhibition of 1910, in which work by Sarah Madeleine Martineau was exhibited

Martineau's education began at Roedean School in Sussex, where she boarded. She then attended Clapham Art School, followed by the Westminster School of Art, alongside her sister Lucy and the Canadian artist Sophie Pemberton. The two sisters rented a studio together, and Sarah submitted a number of works to the Royal Academy, which were rejected. Sarah obtained first class marks in modelling design, and was also awarded a prize in the highly competitive National Competition run by the Science and Art Department of the Committee of the Council on Education.

In 1902, Martineau's focus shifted to metal work, which she studied at the Sir John Cass Technical Institute, and was a member of the Sir John Cass Arts and Crafts Society. She quickly became an established jewellery maker, and in 1906 had two pendants displayed as part of the Arts and Crafts Exhibition at the Grafton Galleries in Mayfair. Over subsequent years, she exhibited in various galleries, including as part of an exhibitions staged by the Society of Women Artists and the Arts and Crafts Exhibition Society. She won first prize in the Studio prize competition in 1911.

== Death and legacy ==
Martineau died on 28 September 1972.

In September 2005, historian Elizabeth Crawford presented a paper at the Women's History Network Conference in Southampton, titled "Painting days at School of Art are perfect bliss: the manuscript diary (1892-1914) of Sarah Madeleine Martineau, art student and craft worker".
