= Catherine Gaskell =

English field hockey player and administrator

Catherine Gaskell MBE (1879–1961) was an English field hockey player and administrator. She was the inaugural president of the International Federation of Women's Hockey Associations.

Gaskell was born in 1879, the daughter of cardiologist Walter Holbrook Gaskell. She studied Classics at Newnham College, Cambridge in 1900 and archaeology at University College London in 1903–1904. She contributed articles to the Dictionary of Archaeology (1906–1914) and the Encyclopaedia of Religion and Ethics (1908).

In 1913, Gaskell captained the England women's field hockey team on a tour of New Zealand. She was also captain and secretary of the Cambridgeshire women's hockey team, which she transformed into a Voluntary Aid Detachment during World War I. After returning to England in October 1914, she became commandant of the temporary St Chad's Auxiliary Hospital in Grange Road, Cambridge. She was appointed Member of the Order of the British Empire for her wartime service.

In 1920, she was vice-president of the All England Women's Hockey Association (AEWHA), and was captain and tour manager of the English team that toured the United States.

In 1927, Gaskell became the inaugural president of the International Federation of Women's Hockey Associations, and she organised its first conference in Geneva in 1930. From 1929 to 1931, she also served as president of the AEWHA.
