= Simon Langton Girls' Grammar School =

Simon Langton Girls’ Grammar School
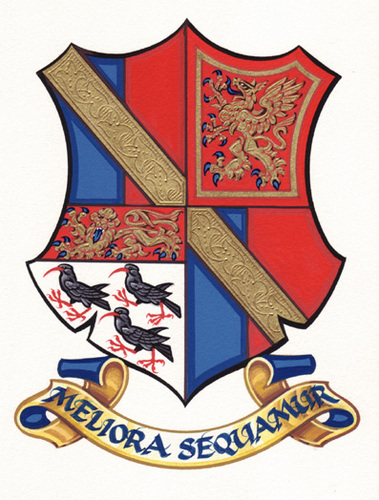

Location
- Old Dover Road; Canterbury, Kent, CT1 3EW; England; 51°15′53″N 1°05′48″E

Information
- Type: Voluntary controlled grammar school
- Motto: Meliora Sequamur (let us aim for better things)
- Religious affiliation: Mixed
- Established: 1881
- Local authority: Kent
- Department for Education URN: 118840 Tables
- Ofsted: Reports
- Chair of Governors: Simon Cook
- Headteacher: Paul Pollard
- Staff: 120+
- Gender: Female (mixed Sixth form)
- Age: 11 to 18
- Enrolment: c. 1200
- Houses: Austen, Curie, Fonteyn, Johnson, Nightingale and Pankhurst
- Colours: Navy, Burgundy, Gold and White
- Publication: Langton Scientist Journal
- Website: http://www.langton.kent.sch.uk/

Simon Langton Girls’ Grammar School is a single-sex voluntary controlled grammar school in Canterbury, Kent, England. The school originated in the Middle Ages as an educational foundation for children in Canterbury, emerging as a separate school for girls in 1881. Its brother school is Simon Langton Grammar School for Boys which resides a mere half mile away.

The school is selective in its intake, with prospective Year 7 students having to take the Kent Procedure for Entrance to Secondary Education, an eleven-plus examination. Around 180 new students are accepted every year at age 11, and around 60 students every year join the sixth form from other schools. 2010 saw the successful introduction of boys into the sixth form.

In the school's Ofsted inspection (July 2014) it was rated 'Good' overall.

== History ==
The history of the school begins with the Blue Coat Boys' School housed at the Poor Priest's Hospital which had been founded in the Middle Ages. In 1881, two new schools (a girls school and a boys school) succeeded it and were called the Canterbury Middle Schools. However, to dispel rumours that they were solely for the use of the middle classes, they were renamed in 1887 to become the Simon Langton Girls' and Boys' schools, named after Simon Langton, an Archdeacon of Canterbury who in 1248 had left behind legacies to the Poor Priest's Hospital.

During the Baedecker Blitz in the Second World War, the old school buildings were destroyed - they were situated in what is now the Whitefriar's Shopping Centre and rebuilt on its present site (just off the A2050) in 1950.

Between 1960 and 1974, Mary Creighton Bailey was headmistress. She brought in a full-time music teacher and instigated plans for a new music block. The block was completed in 1980, and she was invited back to open it. In 2005 Simon Langton Girls' became a specialist school in music and information and communication technology (ICT).

In 2008, the national Gold ArtsMark was awarded to the school for the third time, for excellence in Art, Music, Drama, Dance and Textiles. ArtsMark is the benchmark for arts education provision and Simon Langton Girls' received the Gold award in 2002, 2005 and 2008. Jane Robinson became the head teacher in January 2008.

In 2010, the school gained the International School Award.

== Site ==
The school‘s main classroom block is a 1950s building, originally planned to become a military reserve hospital, which contains thirteen science laboratories, classrooms, studios for art, music and drama, Design Technology workshops and a refurbished Sixth Form centre with a library, computer suite and Common Room. The site is characterised by its green spaces, bordered with steep grassy hills and large trees, which pollinate over the summer.

The school site also has a large sports field, as well as a netball/tennis court and an Orchard, run by the Biology Dept. in conjunction with the WellWorld Project, which aims to promote biodiversity in schools.

A £20m project to build a new classroom block and Sports Hall on site, to replace the original 1950s building, was originally set to open in September 2020, but opened in 2021

== Academic performance and Ofsted reports ==
A 2009 Ofsted inspection found the overall effectiveness of the mathematics subject to be outstanding, stating that "Many students experience outstanding teaching" from "some exceptionally talented teachers" and "some excellent use is made of computer-linked whiteboards to enhance students’ understanding." "Achievement post-16 is good. Standards are very high."

Ofsted lead inspector, Ian Stuart, wrote a letter to pupils on 7 June 2007 to tell them they were "developing into fine young people" who were "outstanding ambassadors" for their generation following the 2007 Ofsted inspection which rated the school as "outstanding" in all areas.

== Academy proposals ==
In 2016 the governing body of Simon Langton Girls' Grammar School began consulting on the possibility of the school converting to academy status. The application to DfE was cancelled after some protest.

== Old Langtonians ==
- Mary Tourtel, creator of Rupert Bear
- Anne Pennington, linguist, philologist and Professor
- Andrea Wonfor, TV executive who launched innovative programmes
- Daphne Todd, artist
- Catherine Waddams, economist and academic
- Cherryl Fountain, still life, landscape and botanical artist
- Dame Jane Francis, Director of the British Antarctic Survey
- Imogen Bain, actress
- Catherine Conybeare, academic and philologist
- Vicky Beeching, musician
- Sian Gordon, English lawn bowler
- Lizzy Rose, artist and disability activist
- PinkPantheress, Singer & Songwriter
- Charlotte Henrich, British sprinter
