= Catherine Conybeare =

British academic and philologist

Catherine Conybeare sitting on the episcopal seat of Augustine of Hippo at the Basilica Pacis in Annaba in 2016. The modern Basilica of Saint Augustine is in the distance

Catherine Mary Conybeare (born 17 August 1966) is an academic and philologist and an authority on Augustine of Hippo. She is currently Leslie Clark Professor in the Humanities at Bryn Mawr College in Pennsylvania.

== Academic career ==
Conybeare was born in Bristol in the United Kingdom and was educated at Oxford High School, Simon Langton Girls' Grammar School, and The King's School, Canterbury. She read classics at Corpus Christi College, Oxford (BA, 1989) and did graduate work in Medieval Studies at the University of Toronto (MA, 1991; PhD, 1997) under the supervision of Brian Stock. From 1996 to 2002 she was at the University of Manchester, including three years as a British Academy Post-Doctoral Fellow in the Department of Classics and Ancient History. In 2002, Conybeare moved back across the Atlantic to take up a position at Bryn Mawr College, where she was promoted to Full Professor in the Department of Greek, Latin, and Classical Studies in 2011. She served as Director of the Graduate Group in Archaeology, Classics, and History of Art at Bryn Mawr College (2006–2014), and was appointed Leslie Clark Professor in the Humanities in 2019.

Conybeare's research centres on the Latin literature and culture of late antiquity, and especially on the writings of Augustine of Hippo. She has been W. John Bennett Distinguished Visiting Scholar at the Pontifical Institute and the Centre for Medieval Studies in Toronto, and has also held Visiting Fellowships at King's College, Cambridge; Corpus Christi College, Oxford; All Souls College, Oxford, the Centre for Research in the Arts, Social Sciences and Humanities (CRASSH) at the University of Cambridge and the Bogliasco Center in Liguria, Italy.

She has been the recipient of a number of awards and fellowships, including from the Guggenheim Foundation, the American Council of Learned Societies and the National Endowment for the Humanities (NEH). Notably, in 2021-22 she led the ACLS-funded project "Greek Drama/Black Lives", which commissioned a new version of Medea from the playwright James Ijames and staged it in a co-production between Bryn Mawr College and the Community College of Philadelphia.

== Publications ==
Conybeare has published widely on such topics as aurality, touch, violence, emotions and the self. She is the author of The Routledge Guidebook to Augustine's Confessions (2016); The Laughter of Sarah: Biblical Exegesis, Feminist Theory, and the Concept of Delight (2013), which examines the place of delight in Jewish and Christian interpretative traditions; The Irrational Augustine (2006) which charts Augustine's progress from neo-Platonism to incarnational theology in his Cassiciacum dialogues; and Paulinus Noster: Self and Symbols in the Letters of Paulinus of Nola (2000), looking at the formation of spiritual community through early Christian letter collections.

She has edited several collections of essays, including co-editing with Simon Goldhill Classical Philology and Theology: Entanglement, Disavowal, and the Godlike Scholar (2021) and, with José Luis Bermúdez, The Self in Premodern Thought (2026).

Conybeare's book Augustine the African (2025) is a new biography of Augustine of Hippo which places North Africa at the centre of his life and thought. The New Yorker writes:

This biography of St. Augustine casts the philosopher not only as a theologian who profoundly shaped Christian orthodoxy but also as a person indelibly marked by his status as an African in the Roman Empire…. Conybeare... intertwines learned exegesis with examples of Augustine’s human idiosyncrasies, offering illuminating analyses of the philosopher’s seminal texts and ideas―including his theory of original sin―and of the role that his heritage played in his self-conception.

The Critic calls it "a book startlingly charged and suffused with a sense of curiosity and compassion towards its subject, a quality that gives the text an almost novelistic sense of emotional urgency".

Conybeare is now working on a new translation of Augustine's Confessions for Norton. She is also editor of the series from Cambridge University Press, 'Cultures of Latin', to which she is contributing a volume entitled Latin, Music, and Meaning.

== Personal life ==
Conybeare has two sons: Gabriel (born 1994) and Hilary (born 2000). She is a keen amateur musician and studies the organ with Parker Kitterman at Christ Church, Philadelphia.
