= Lizzy Rose =

British artist and disability activist

- Born: 1988
- Died: 2022 (aged 33–34)
- Website: lizzyrose.co.uk

Lizzy Rose (1988-2022) was an artist and disability activist who lived and worked in Margate in Kent, England.

Rose's work explored community, British identity and hidden culture, chronic illness communities online and the culture surrounding them, narrative storytelling, and humour. Her practice included video, photography, ceramics, drawing, writing and curation.

Her work has been shown at Somerset House, the Barbican Centre, the Turner Contemporary and Goldsmiths, and featured in The Guardian newspaper.

== Background ==
Rose lived in Kent for most of her life and was based in Margate.

Born in Australia, Rose grew up in Kent. She went to Simon Langton Girls’ Grammar School in Canterbury, before studying Fine Art at Central Saint Martins, London. She graduated with a first class degree in 2010.

After university Rose worked as a gallery assistant at the Turner Contemporary in Margate, Kent. From 2012 to 2015 she worked with Limbo arts in Margate as assistant curator. In 2016 she toured Japan to study trends in Japanese art, and became part of the programming team at the Crate gallery, Margate. The same year she became an associate at Open School East art school in London.

== Crohn's and impact on artwork ==
Rose had Crohn's disease. Her work addressed chronic illness, and how society deals with it.

Rose spent an increasing amount of time in hospital from 2010 onwards. She turned her hospital bed into a studio, documenting and reflecting on the daily reality of this environment. During this time, she began to use social media to make her work.

== Notable artwork ==
=== Journey to film a ruin (2009) ===
Rose's mystical Journey to Film a Ruin links Rose's key interests: chronic illness, communities as bodies and overlooked spaces.

The film, shot on a Super 8, explores the vanished communities of the wetlands of Kent and Sussex. It was shown at Somerset House in London in February 2023.

=== Hospital watercolour club (2014) ===
Rose's series ‘Hospital Watercolour Club’ (2014), features observational still life works of hospital wares, depicting a bottle of hand sanitizer, a fire alarm and a mobility grab handle. The watercolour and pencil series ‘You meming about your illness is making me uncomfortable’ (2014) recreated internet memes using humour to process frustrations with societal responses to sickness.

=== Sick blue sea (2018) ===
The video work Sick, blue sea, shown in the final show Gut Feelings in December 2018, was the culmination of several ideas Rose explored throughout her year as an Associate at Open School East. Rose began researching critical thinking around the politics of the body, the relationship between the body and technology and to what extend the body affects politics around identity.

The work follows a fictional narrative spoken by a teenage sperm whale blogging about her chronic nausea.

=== Arrangement (2018) ===
Rose's solo show Arrangement examined the culture around flower arranging, nature and knowledge-sharing between cultures. Her installation The Meaning of the Wild, presented a video filmed in The Ohara School of Ikebana in Japan, in a moss-filled room at Crate.

=== Intravenous Living Salad (2018) ===
Intravenous Living Salad (2018) contained her total parenteral nutrition (TPN) bag, which hangs above a pile of salad leaves. Rose used the TPN to grow and sustain the leaves.

=== My heart will go on (2018) ===
Rose screened her video piece ‘My Heart Will Go On’ at the ICA in 2018 as part of the event ‘On Cripping’. The work is a comical take on a critical stay in hospital, and shows Lizzy's heart monitor beeping, layered with a soundtrack of her playing the titular Titanic number on a keyboard.

== High court challenge ==
A judicial review action was brought by Rose against Thanet CCG in 2014. Rose's doctors recommended bone marrow transplantation and chemotherapy and Rose sought NHS funding for oocyte cryopreservation before beginning treatment. Clinicians at King's College Hospital Foundation Trust applied for funding for Rose's treatment but Thanet CCG denied the treatment in May 2013 on the grounds that there was not enough evidence to demonstrate its effectiveness.

Rose sought judicial review on:

- the decision constituted direct discrimination (on the basis that funding for semen cryopreservation was provided to men in similar circumstances).
- it was a breach of the defendant's public sector equality duty under section 149 of the Equality Act 2010, and
- it breached her rights under articles 8 and 14 of the European Convention on Human Rights (and therefore section 6 of the Human Rights Act 1998).

These arguments were unsuccessful, however, the judge, Mr Justice Jay, said the CCG "failed properly to address" recommendations made by the National Institute for Health and Care Excellence and its current funding policy was unlawful.

On their website, NICE issued a press notice saying "Clinical Commissioning Groups (CCGs) cannot choose not to follow NICE guidance because they merely disagree with it, even where there is no statutory duty to do so, a court has ruled."

== Dangerous women ==
Rose's essay "Exposing Trauma: the post-surgery selfie" was included in the book, Dangerous Women: fifty reflections on power, women and identity by Jo Shaw, Ben Fletcher-Watson and Abrisham Ahmadzadeh.

== Exhibitions ==
=== Things I have learned the hard way - retrospective (2023) ===
A retrospective month-long exhibition of Rose's work (31 March - 23 April 2023) was held across multiple venues in Margate - at Crate, Limbo, Well Projects and Turner Contemporary - alongside a live event at the ICA in London, live streamed by Wysing Broadcasts.

An online outreach programme invited hospitalised and housebound artists to share their work and stories.

=== The time of our lives (2024) ===
Rose's work was featured as part of the Drawing Room exhibition, 'The Time Of Our Lives'. The Time of Our Lives focuses on the pioneering drawing practices of women artists and their impact on feminist activism from the 1980s until today.
