= Alix von Cotta =

British educator and activist (1842–1931)

- Born: 1842; Braunschweig
- Died: December 1931 (aged 88–89); Hanover
- Education: Newnham College

Alix von Cotta (1842 – December 1931) was a UK promoter of women's education in Germany. She was the second principal of the Victoria Lyceum in Berlin.

== Life ==
Cotta was born in Braunschweig in 1842 to Carl Berhard von Cotta and Ilsabe Ida von Orges. She and her two sisters spoke English and her father was a professor of geology. An 1866 paper written by her father was translated into English by a solicitor Philip Lawrence. Lawrence had a daughter named Penelope. Cotta was fluent in several languages and she corresponded with Penelope Lawrence who, like Cotta, was to be a leader in education. Lawrence and Cotta were educated together at Newnham College in Cambridge. Cotta studied French, German, English and Old English.

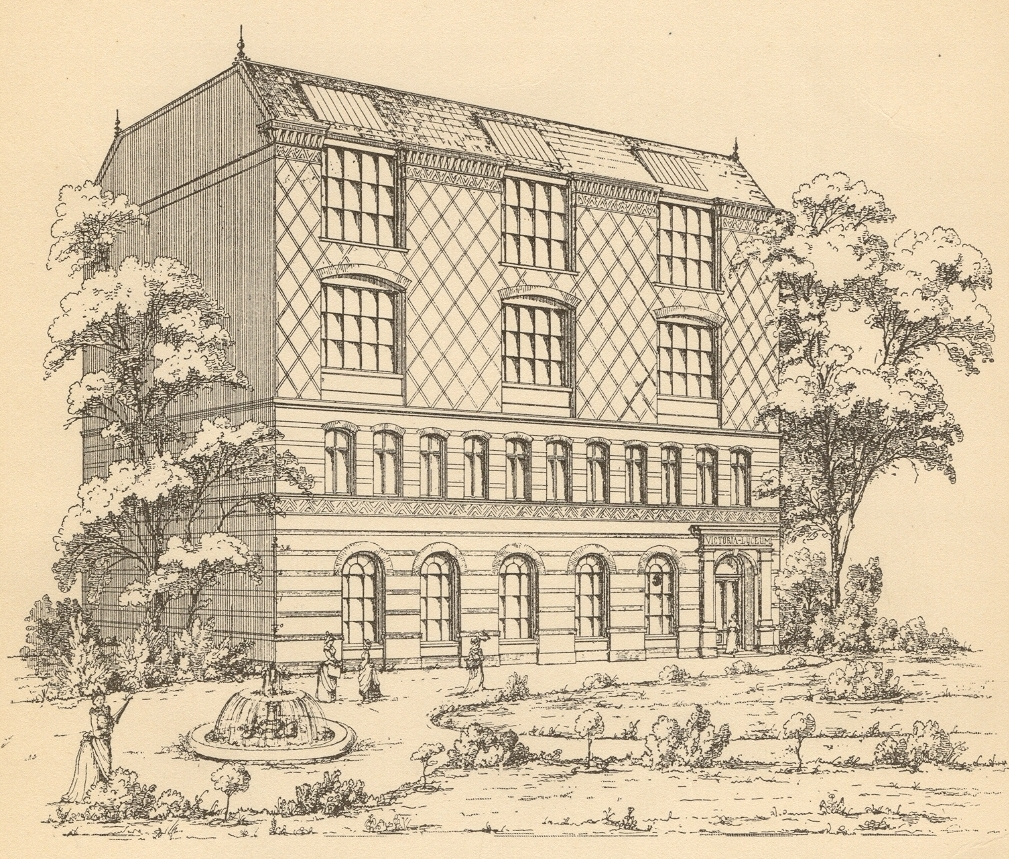
The Victoria Lyceum in 1893

After she left Newnham she was invited to work at Bedford College. For two years she taught women in a preparatory section where students could be readied for college studies. Cotta then returned to Germany, where she wrote about her experiences of educating women. Cotta's experience at Newnham college are said to be the reason that Crown Princess Victoria chose her over other well qualified candidates to lead the Victoria Lyceum after its founder died. This novel organisation had been founded by a Scots woman Georgina Archer and it was providing educational lectures to German women on various subjects but it was not providing any examinations.

In 1892 Cotta introduced formal two-year courses at the lyceum in both German and history. This followed a growing realisation that Germany needed women teachers for these subjects at an advanced level. However it was understood that science and grammar would by taught by male teachers. It was agreed that women required full-time training to be teachers and Cotta and her senior staff were consulted - although they could not agree on the length of such a course.

Cotta continued to write to Penelope Lawrence every few weeks. In July 1930 she wrote a brief note to "Nelly" explaining that she was too weak to write a letter she finishing with "Goodbye old friend". Sixty years of her letters to Lawrence are available at the University of London. She died in Hanover in 1931.
