= Logan Scott-Bowden =

British Army general

Major-General Logan Scott-Bowden CBE DSO MC*
- Born: 21 February 1920; Whitehaven, Cumbria, England
- Died: 9 February 2014 (aged 93)
- Military career
- Allegiance: United Kingdom
- Branch: British Army
- Service years: 1939−1974
- Rank: Major-General
- Service number: 95182
- Unit: Royal Engineers
- Commands: 17th Field Company, Royal Engineers; Ulster Defence Regiment
- Conflicts: World War II; Korean War
- Awards: Commander of the Order of the British Empire; Distinguished Service Order; Military Cross and Bar

Major-General Logan Scott-Bowden CBE DSO MC & Bar (21 February 1920 – 9 February 2014) was a British army officer. A Royal Engineers officer during World War II, he was the first commander of the Ulster Defence Regiment. Retiring as a major-general in 1974, he served as the colonel-commandant of the Royal Engineers from 1975 to 1980.

== Early life ==
Scott-Bowden was born in Whitehaven, Cumbria on 21 February 1920, the son of Lt.Col. Jonathan Scott-Bowden, OBE, TD, and Mary Scott-Bowden (née Logan), an international cricket player. He was educated at Malvern College and the Royal Military Academy, Woolwich. He was commissioned into the Royal Engineers on 3 July 1939.

== Military career ==
Scott-Bowden saw early service in Norway in 1940, before joining the 53rd (Welsh) Infantry Division as an Adjutant in 1941. During 1942 and 1943 he served on liaison duty with Canadian and American forces.

In mid 1943 Scott-Bowden joined Combined Operations Pilotage Parties (COPP), the reconnaissance unit tasked with scouting the beaches for the D-Day landings. Scott-Bowden and another COPPist, Sergeant Bruce Ogden-Smith, swam ashore in Normandy over thirty times to obtain sand samples to see whether the beach would support tanks.

A trial landing at a Norfolk beach had proved that they would not be detected when they swam ashore at night from an LCT.

At midnight on 31 December 1943, Scott-Bowden and Ogden-Smith, during Operation KJH, landed on Gold Beach to take samples of the material from the beach. They swam ashore from a landing craft operated by 712th Landing Craft Personnel (Survey) Flotilla. They found that the sand, in places, was thin and supported by weak peat material. They took samples back to the United Kingdom that allowed planners to cope with the weaker-than-expected beaches.

Scott-Bowden and Ogden-Smith returned to Normandy from 17–21 January 1944, this time operating from X20, an X-class midget submarine, during Operation Bellpush Able. They twice swam ashore onto sectors of Omaha Beach. After returning to the UK, Scott-Bowden was summoned to a briefing with General Omar Bradley. Scott-Bowden said to him "Sir, I hope you don’t mind me saying it, but this beach is a very formidable proposition indeed and there are bound to be tremendous casualties." Bradley put his hand on his shoulder and replied "I know, my boy. I know."

On D-Day both Sgt. Ogden-Smith and Maj. Scott-Bowden assisted in piloting the initial American landings on Omaha Beach. He then went on to command 17 Field Squadron for the remainder of the War.

After World War II, he had operational service in Burma, Palestine, Korea, Aden and lastly in Northern Ireland. In Northern Ireland he was given the challenging task of forming the Ulster Defence Regiment. His final appointment in the Armed Services, on promotion to Major General, was as Head of the British Defence Liaison Staff, India. After retirement from active service Scott-Bowden served as the Colonel-Commandant of the Royal Engineers from 1975 to 1980.

== Personal life ==
In 1950 he married Helen Jocelyn, daughter of late Major Sir Francis Caradoc Rose Price, 5th Bt, and late Marjorie Lady Price. They had three sons and three daughters.

== Honours ==
- Commander of the Order of the British Empire (CBE) 1 January 1972
- Officer of the Order of the British Empire (OBE) 6 June 1964
- Distinguished Service Order 15 June 1944 (Operation Bell Push Able, Normandy reconnaissance January 1944)
- Military Cross (MC) 2 March 1944 Operation KJH (Normandy reconnaissance December 1943 - January 1944)
- Bar to the Military Cross (MC and Bar) 22 January 1946

== Appointments ==
He held a number of appointments throughout his career including:

- 3 July 1939, commissioned, Corps of Royal Engineers
- 1940, served in Norway
- 4 May 1941 – 3 June 1942, Adjutant, 53rd (Welsh) Infantry Division, RE
- 1942 – 1943, Liaison Duties in Canada and United States
- 25 January 1943 – 24 May 1943, Adjutant
- 1943 – 1944, Normandy Beach Reconnaissance Team
- 1944 – 1945, Officer Commanding, 17th Field Company RE (NW Europe)
- 29 May 1946 – 2 December 1946, GSO2, HQ Allied Land Forces South East Asia (Singapore)
- 03.12.1946 – 18 October 1947, Brigade Major, 98th Indian Infantry Brigade (Burma)
- 16 October 1950 – 3 December 1950, SORE2, HQ British Troops in Egypt (Palestine)
- 1951, served in Libya
- 1 March 1951 – 11 February 1953, DAQMG, War Office
- 1953, served in Korea
- 24 July 1954 – 2 April 1956, brigade major, HQ Training Brigade
- 1 April 1958 – 18 February 1959, GSO2 Joint Secretariat HQ British Forces Arabian Peninsular
- 20 February 1959 – 24 April 1960, GSO1 (Plans) (Arabia)
- 1960 – 1962, Commander Royal Engineers (CRE), 1st Division (British Army of the Rhine)
- 20 December 1962 – 29 March 1964, GSO1 (Home Defence Plans), UK Land Forces HQ, Eastern Command
- 31 March 1964 – 6 May 1966, Assistant Director of Plans, War Office
- 20 May 1966 – January 1967, Commander, HQ Training Brigade
- 1969, National Defence College, India
- 1970 – 1971, Commander, Ulster Defence Regiment
- 1971 – 1974, Head of British Defence Liaison Staff, India
- 1975 – 1980, Colonel-Commandant, Corps of Royal Engineers

== Ranks ==
2nd Lieutenant	3 July 1939
Lieutenant	3 January 1941
Acting Captain	15 November 1940 – 14 February 1941
Temporary Captain	15 February 1941 – 24 August 1943
War Substantive Captain	25 August 1943
Captain	1 July 1946
Acting Major	25 May 1943 – 24 August 1943
Temporary Major	25 August 1943 – 2 July 1952
Major	3 July 1952
Temporary Lieutenant Colonel	2 February 1959 – 19 August 1960
Lieutenant colonel	20 August 1960 (supernumerary 20 August 1963)
Temporary Colonel	31 March 1964 – 10 July 1964
Colonel	11 July 1964
Temporary Brigadier	20 May 1966 – 30 December 1966
Brigadier	31 December 1966
Major-General	17 August 1971
Retired	5 September 1974

Military offices
Preceded by New post	Commanding Officer Ulster Defence Regiment; 1970−1971	Succeeded by Denis Ormerod
