= Barbara Winifred West =

"Bar" West
- while playing golf
- Born: 9 November 1913; Rugby, Warwickshire
- Died: 4 November 2014 (aged 100); East Surrey Hospital, Earlswood
- Known for: Hockey for England

Barbara "Bar" Winifred West (9 November 1913 – 4 November 2014) was a British hockey player, coach, and administrator. She and her twin Bridget West played Hockey for England and she was involved with British hockey for 50 years.

== Life ==
West was born in Rugby in 1913, twenty minutes before her identical sister, Bridget. She had two other sisters and in time a half brother. She was known as "Bar". Her father Francis Charles Bartholomew (Frank) West, a vicar’s son was called to the bar. He was of independent means and never practised. Her mother had attended Newnham College. Her father died as a soldier when she was a child. Her mother remarried and they had another son, Roger.

She trained to be a teacher at Froebel Institute in Roehampton. She then taught at Bartram Gables School, Downes School and Brighton and Hove High School. She taught at Chelsea College of Physical Education in Eastbourne for 22 years where she also coached. In her spare time she was a leader for the Girl Guides.

She was a member of the Women's Institutes and she helped her village of Alfriston to become the Best kept village competition.

West died in East Surrey Hospital in 2014 at the age of 100.

== Hockey ==
She toured New Zealand as part of the England women's hockey team in 1938 when they won all of their fifteen matches. During the war she told the story of how a school game was interrupted when a passing German plane decide to machine gun the players. The only injury was a nettle sting as one girl dived for cover. After the war she played hockey for England touring the USA in 1947. The team included her sister Bridget West and Mary Russell Vick. They played 18 matches on that tour with one goalkeeper confused when two identical players both had a try at scoring a goal. The sisters were lifelong chums and in 1971 they were asked to look after the klaxon during a Scotland-England hockey match. They were so engrossed in the game that they forget to ring the klaxon and Scotland won the game 2-1.

West acted as a selector and a coach. The goalkeeper Hazel Feltwell and the forward Val Robinson were two of her mentees.
