= Morten Hviid =

Morten Hviid, MA (Warwick), Cand Oecon (Aarhus), PhD (Warwick),, was formerly Professor of Competition Law at the University of East Anglia. He previously held posts in the Economics Departments at University of Copenhagen and University of Warwick and in the School of Economic and Social Studies, University of East Anglia. He published in both fields, including papers in Economic Journal, European Competition Journal, International Journal of Industrial Organization, Journal of Law and Economics and Oxford Journal of Legal Studies. He was a founding member and a principal investigator of the ESRC Centre for Competition Policy and acted as an advisor to the Office of Fair Trading and the Department of Constitutional Affairs in the UK. He was a former editor of the Journal of Industrial Economics and associate editor of the International Journal of Industrial Organization. He was also a former member of the Executive Committee of the European Association for Research in Industrial Economics (EARIE).

== Personal life ==
In 1994, Hviid married Catherine Waddams.

== Bibliography ==
- Scott, A, M. Hviid and B. Lyons, 2005, Merger Control in the UK, Oxford University Press.
- Working Papers
