= Pauline Boumphrey =

American artist

- Born: Pauline Firth; 11 October 1886; Boston, US
- Died: 25 January 1959 (aged 72); New York, US
- Known for: Sculpture

Pauline Boumphrey (née Pauline Firth, later Pauline Firth Haworth; 11 October 1886 – 25 January 1959) was an American sculptor who spent the majority of her career working in Britain.

== Biography ==
Boumphrey was born in Boston in Massachusetts but was educated in Britain, attending Roedean School on the English south coast. She settled in London and later lived at Sandiway in Cheshire.

Boumphrey specialised in statuettes and small group compositions, often in bronze, and often of equine subjects. In 1925 she was awarded an honourable mention for a piece she showed at the Salon des Artistes Francais in Paris. Boumphrey also exhibited works at the Royal Academy in London, at the Walker Art Gallery in Liverpool and in Glasgow and Edinburgh. She was a regular exhibitor with the Manchester Academy of Fine Arts and was elected an associate member of that Academy in 1925. Among the works she exhibited in Manchester was a 1942 design for a war memorial to the civilian victims of the Blitz. Boumphrey died in New York in 1959.
