= Edith Marie Thompson =

English hockey tour manager and local politician (1877–1861)

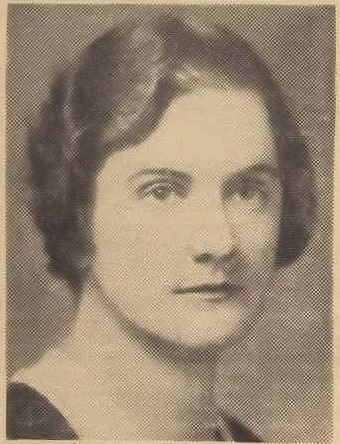
Edith Thompson in 1934

Edith Marie Thompson CBE (1877–1961) was an English field hockey team manager, army inspector, writer and local politician. She held several committee positions in both World Wars and contributed to raising the popularity of field hockey for women.

== Early life and World War I ==
Thompson was born in Kensington in 1877, the only daughter of W.F. Thompson. She was educated at Norland Place School and Cheltenham Ladies' College, and studied at King's College London in 1895, though she took no examination.

During World War I, Thompson served with the Voluntary Aid Detachment. She was appointed Assistant Chief Controller of Inspection of Queen Mary's Army Auxiliary Corps, for which role she was mentioned in dispatches. She received the OBE in 1919 and the CBE in 1920. She wrote a history of the QMAAC and helped found an old comrades' association for it.

== Sport ==
In 1901 she founded the weekly journal Hockey Field, which she edited until 1920. She also published a book, Hockey as a Game for Women, in 1904.

In 1923 she became President of the All England Women's Hockey Association. She worked as manager for the England field hockey team on tours to Australia, Denmark, France, Germany, and South Africa, including a highly publicised tour to Australia in 1923.

In 1925, Thompson joined the inaugural executive committee of the National Playing Fields Association.

In 1926, Thompson chaired the meeting which founded England Netball.

== Later positions ==
In World War II, Thompson worked at the headquarters of the Women's Land Army and as a liaison officer to the Children's Overseas Reception Board in South Africa. She also served on the Executive of the Society for the Overseas Settlement of British Women, leading tours to Canada for British women to find employment.

Thompson was on the Council of Bedford College and St Felix School, and a municipal councillor of Aldeburgh, Suffolk, and served as its mayor for eight years.
