= Vera Cox =

English sportswoman (1885 – 1973)

Vera Mary Machell Cox MBE (1885 – 1973) was an English hockey player who helped found the Women’s Cricket Association and the International Women’s Cricket Council, and held major roles in the Women’s Institute and the Women’s Land Army.

== Sport ==
Born Veronica Mary Machell Cox, Vera played hockey for Kent, the East of England, and England between 1908 and 1912. She captained the team in 1912. After sustaining a knee injury in a 1912 fixture against Ireland, Cox returned to club hockey and served as a coach and umpire, umpiring for 30 international fixtures between 1914 and 1939. She also sat on several committees in the All England Women’s Hockey Association.

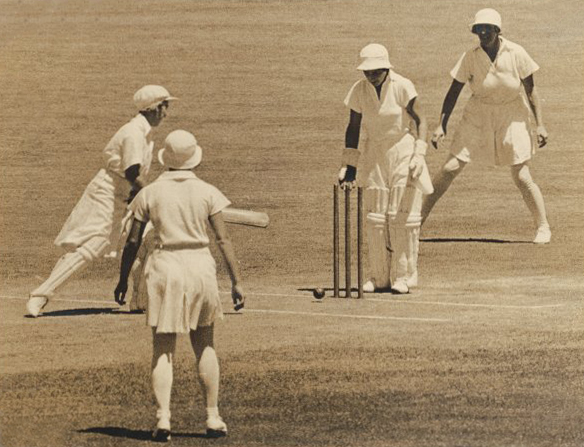
The 1935 women's Test

In 1926, Cox became one of the founding members of the Women’s Cricket Association (WCA). She served as the secretary of the first committee, chaired by Frances Heron-Maxwell. She helped establish the first women’s international Test match between England and Australia in 1934 with her friend Elsie Bennett, another former hockey player. Cox then became President of the WCA, during which time she contributed to the formation of the International Women’s Cricket Council, comprising former Commonwealth lands including England, Australia, New Zealand and South Africa. She stepped down in 1964.

== Other positions ==
Cox served as the first national Markets Organiser for the National Federation of Women’s Institutes from 1932, and helped establish hundreds of markets for Women’s Institute members to sell surplus produce.

She served as County Secretary for the West Kent Women’s Land Army during World War II, for which she was awarded an MBE in 1946.

== Personal life ==
Cox lived with Patrick and Frances Heron-Maxwell, whom she had met through hockey playing in 1908, from 1919. On Frances’ death in 1955 she inherited their estate, Great Comp, and sold it the following year. She died in 1973 in Scotland.
