= Frances Heron-Maxwell =

English sportswoman and suffragist (1863 – 1955)

Frances Heron-Maxwell MBE
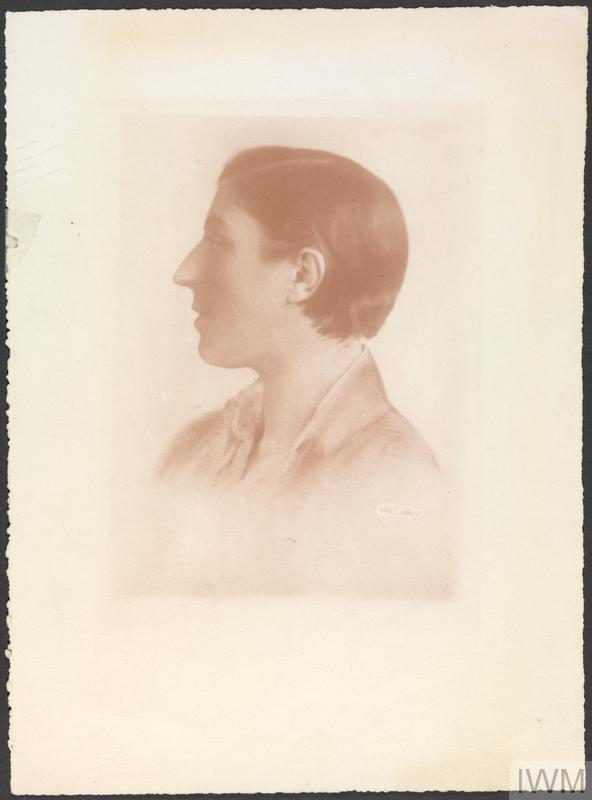
- Frances Heron-Maxwell in 1918
- Born: Frances Jane Cockburn; 1863
- Died: July 1955 (aged 91–92); Berne
- Known for: Co-founder and inaugural chairman of Women's Cricket Association; Vice-Chairman of West Kent Women's War Agricultural Committee
- Movement: Women's suffrage Women's dress reform

Frances Heron-Maxwell MBE (1863 – 1955) was an English suffragist and sportswoman. She served as president of the All England Women’s Hockey Association and as the inaugural chairman of the Women’s Cricket Association, meaning that she oversaw the first ever international women's Test series. She belonged to, and founded, several groups campaigning for women's suffrage and dress reform, and she received an MBE for her work with the West Kent Women's War Agricultural Committee in World War I. She also held leadership positions in the Women's Institute and, in World War II, the Women's Land Army.

== Early life ==
Born Frances Jane Cockburn to Admiral James Cockburn, she married Patrick Heron-Maxwell in February 1886. In 1903, they moved to the manor house of Great Comp in Kent, where they renovated the gardens, adding two hockey pitches, a cricket ground, and a sports pavilion.

== Political activism ==
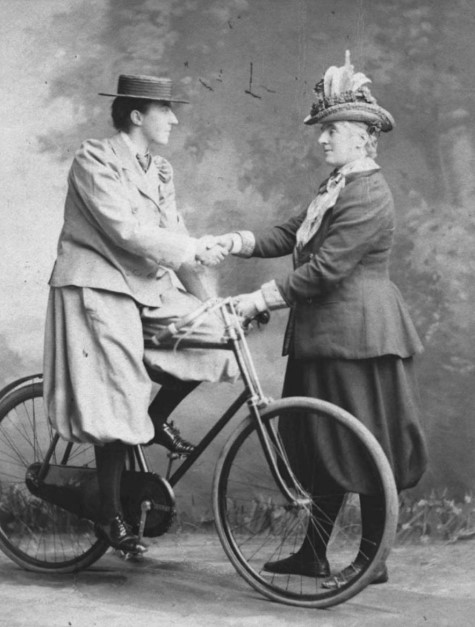
Frances-Heron Maxwell (left) meeting fellow dress reform campaigner Viscountess Harberton, circa 1903

In the 1890s, Heron-Maxwell was a member of the Women’s Liberal Association and the Central Committee. She and her friend Eva McLaren co-owned a piece of land in Newton Stewart, where they established a branch of the Women's Emancipation Union by 1896. In 1903, Heron-Maxwell served as secretary of the Rational Dress Society.

In 1908, she co-founded the Forward Suffrage Union, a subset of the Liberal Party focused on women's suffrage, with Eva McLaren and Marie Corbett. The Union sent a deputation headed by Alison Garland to Prime Minister H. H. Asquith to discuss the Conciliation Bill in 1911. In 1913, Heron-Maxwell also co-founded the Liberal Women’s Suffrage Society.

== Sport ==
A goalkeeper in hockey, Heron-Maxwell founded women’s hockey team The Pilgrims. She served as captain of the West Kent Ladies' Hockey Association from 1907, and then as president of the All England Women's Hockey Association (AEWHA) from 1912 to 1922.

In 1926, members of the AEWHA met for a cricketing holiday at a hotel owned by one of the members, and the holiday was so successful that it was decided that a women’s cricket association should be formed. Frances Heron-Maxwell served as the chairman of the Women's Cricket Association (WCA) from 1926 to 1939. In the first season, ten clubs became members of the Association, as well as 28 schools and six colleges. This rose to 210 member clubs in 1938.

During her tenure, the WCA sent a team to Australia in 1934–5, where the England women won a three-match Test series 2–0 and one Test against New Zealand, and received a return visit from the Australian women’s cricket team in 1937. The Australian team practised on the cricket ground on Heron-Maxwell’s estate, and she arranged for them to explore England by coach tour and meet Prime Minister Stanley Baldwin. The three-match series was drawn 1–1.

A constitution for the WCA was drawn up in 1931 – Heron-Maxwell felt that it might be burdensome if it were drawn up too early. The WCA adopted a similar, decentralised model to the AEWHA, where responsibility was held at a local level.

Heron-Maxwell was also known as a mountain-climber.

== Wartime and public service ==
In 1918, Heron-Maxwell was awarded an MBE for her work as Vice-Chairman of the West Kent Women's War Agricultural Committee.

The same year, she established the West Kent branch of the Women’s Institute, which consisted of 58 local Women's Institutes by 1920. She instigated an annual Women's Institute tour to Switzerland in 1924, and remained on the County Committee until 1954, when she was 91. She also served on the national executive committee of the Women’s Institute.

During World War II, Heron-Maxwell served as vice-chair of the Women’s Land Army in Kent. Great Comp served as the headquarters for the Kent WLA.

== Personal life and death ==
Heron-Maxwell was a keen sewer, potter and gardener, and a friend of Vita-Sackville West, her colleague on the committee of the Women’s Land Army. She continued to live at Great Comp with her fellow WCA board member Vera Cox until her death in July 1955 in Berne on a holiday to Switzerland.
