= Georgina Archer =

German women's rights activist

- Born: 27 September 1827; Edinburgh, Scotland
- Died: 18 November 1882 (aged 55); Montreux, Switzerland
- Occupations: Women’s rights activist Educator

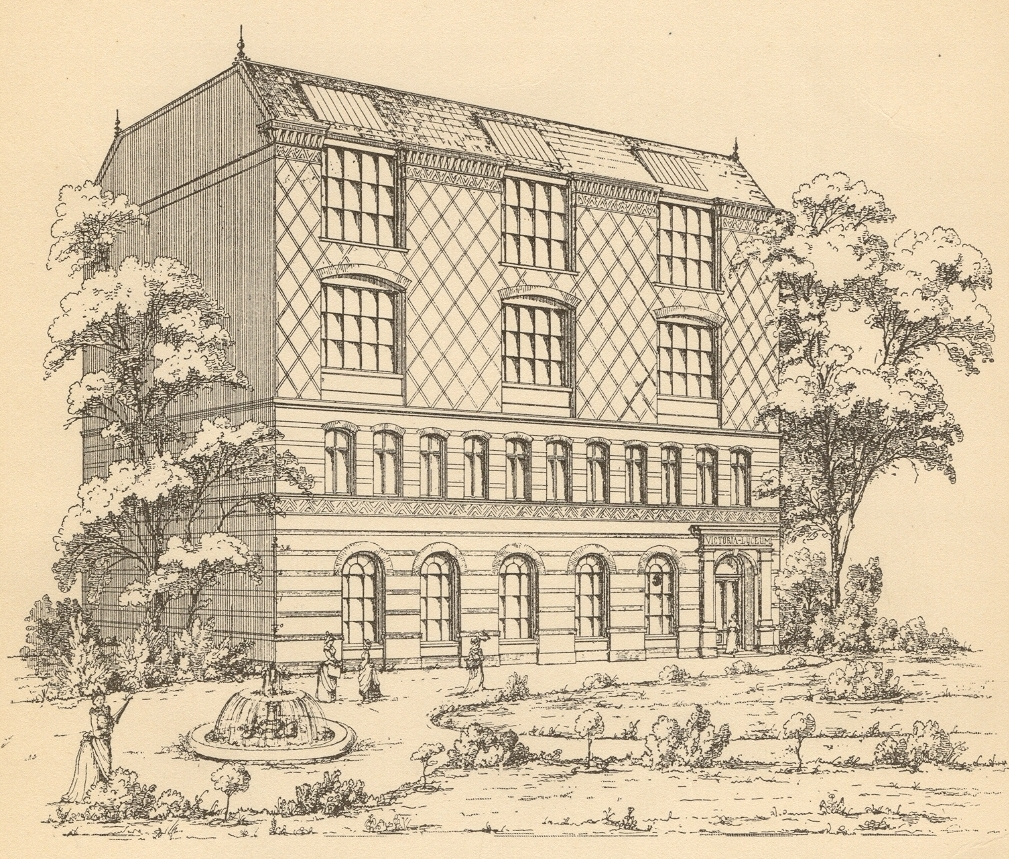
The Victoria Lyceum in 1893

Georgina Archer (27 September 1827 – 18 November 1882) was a German (originally Scottish) women's rights activist and educator. She played a significant part in the history of women's education in Germany. She is known as the founder of the Victoria-Lyzeum in Berlin (1869). This institution went on to prepare female students for university studies.

== Life ==
Archer was born in Edinburgh, Scotland, on 27 September 1827, the daughter of Andrew and Ann Archer, and was one of four children. Her elder brother, James Archer, was a notable artist. When she was 14 she went to live with two unmarried aunts and she attended a private school. Archer lived in Berlin since the mid-1850s, and worked as an English tutor.

She is the founder of the Victoria-Lyzeum in Berlin, which opened in January 1869. Archer had organized teachers, funds to pay them and a board of directors. This was a pioneer institution, but it was launched with modest ambitions so as to not intimidate potential pupils. This was a private venture that was supported by Crown Princess Victoria. The ambition was not to start a university but to provide lectures to women whose education had ceased after they left school. Archer, known as Miss Archer, gave some of the lectures but guests included Friedrich Paulsen, Erich Schmidt and Hugo von Tschudi. By 1875 they had more than 900 students taking courses in the history of art, German and French literature, botany, physics, geology, chemistry and pedagogy. Archer had allowed two separate attempts at offering philosophy lectures, but after two teachers were considered unacceptable, the subject was abandoned.

Archer's death occurred on 18 November 1882 in Montreux, Switzerland, where she was trying to recover from overwork. Her role in leading the Lyceum was taken on by Alix von Cotta, who had like Archer been educated in England. Cotta introduced even more advanced courses, and the Lyceum trained many women to teach advanced courses at Prussia's 200 public schools for girls.
