= Women's Cricket Association =

Former governing body of women's cricket in England

The Women's Cricket Association (WCA) was responsible for the running of women's cricket in England between 1926 and 1998.

The WCA was founded by a group of enthusiasts following a cricket holiday on the grounds of Mary Scott-Bowden's hotel in Colwall. Hockey players, many of them members of the All-England Women's Hockey Association who had played hockey for England, organised the holiday so as to continue playing sport in the summer. Due to the success of the holiday, Kathleen Doman formally proposed that an association for women's cricket be formed. The first committee consisted of Frances Heron-Maxwell as chairman and Vera Cox as secretary, along with Scott-Bowden, Doman, E.R. Clarke, Miss Hatten, and Miss Abbott. Forty-nine games were arranged in that first season, and the popular cricket festival at Stowe Lane, Colwall, which is still held today, was launched.

By the following season there were ten affiliated clubs, by 1934 there were eighty, and by 1938 the number had reached 123. At its peak there were 208 affiliated clubs and 94 school and junior teams.

By 1931 the first county associations had been formed, and Durham played a combined Cheshire and Lancashire XI. Four years later the country was divided into five regional associations or 'Territories': East, Midlands, North, South and West. High interest in forming women's clubs was seen in the late 1940s and the 1950s.

In 1970, the regional organisations were reformed into Area Associations, which covered smaller areas of the country.

The WCA administered the Women's Area Championship (1980–1996), the Women's Territorial Tournament (1988–1994) and the first Women's County Championship season, in 1997. In 1998, the WCA handed over the running of women's cricket in England to the England and Wales Cricket Board (ECB) and disbanded.

== See also ==
- Netta Rheinberg and Rachael Heyhoe-Flint, Fair Play – the story of women's cricket, Angus & Robertson, 1976, ISBN 978-0-207-95698-0.
