= Women's Territorial Tournament =

- Administrator: Women's Cricket Association
- Format: Limited overs cricket
- First edition: 1988
- Latest edition: 1994
- Tournament format: Round Robin
- Most successful: North (4 titles)

The Women's Territorial Tournament was a women's cricket competition organised by the Women's Cricket Association that ran from 1988 until 1994. It operated predominantly as a 55-over limited overs cricket competition, with 4 regional teams playing each other in a round robin format.

The tournament followed the Women's Area Championship and the teams playing in the Territorial Tournament were selected from players playing in the Area Championship. Teams in the Territorial Tournament were regionalised, comprising players from two or three Championship teams.

North Women were the most successful side in the history of the Territorial Tournament, winning four titles. Midwest Women won the other two titles, whilst there was no winner in 1991 as only two 3-day matches were played.

== History ==
The inaugural Territorial Tournament took place in 1988, following the 1988 Women's Area Championship and was won by North, winning all three of their games. North went on to be the most successful side in the Territorial Tournament, winning four titles, reflecting the simultaneous success of Yorkshire in the Area Championship, from which they drew many of their players. Midwest were the only other side to win the tournament, topping the table in 1989 and 1992. The tournament was played using a 55-over format in all years but one, 1991. In 1991, the tournament was instead made up of two 3-day matches, East v Midwest and North v South. Midwest beat East by 10 wickets, whilst the match between North and South was drawn.

The tournament's final season was in 1994 after which it was discontinued. The Area Championship was discontinued after the 1996 season, and was replaced by the Women's County Championship. The regional teams did survive however, and played warm-up games against touring international sides and for the 1993 Women's Cricket World Cup.

== Teams ==
Teams in the Territorial Tournament were regionalised, made up of a combination of teams that played in the Women's Area Championship. The teams that competed were:

Team	Area Championship Teams		
East	East Anglia	Kent	Sussex
Midwest	East Midlands	West	West Midlands
North	Lancashire and Cheshire	Yorkshire	
South	Middlesex	Surrey	Thames Valley

== Winners ==
Season	Winner	Runner-up	Ref
1988	North	Midwest	
1989	Midwest	North	
1990	North	South	
1991	No overall winner		
1992	Midwest	North	
1993	North	Midwest	
1994	North	East	

== See also ==
- Women's Area Championship
- Women's County Championship
