= Jane Francis =

British paleoclimatologist

Professor Dame Jane Francis DCMG FRS
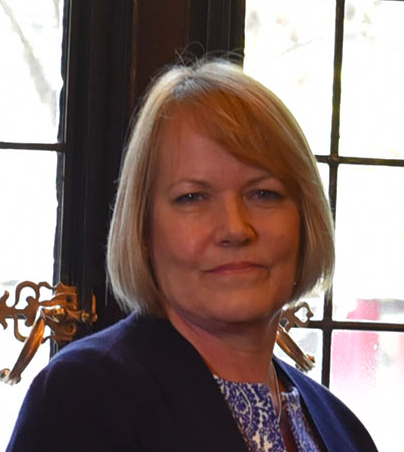
- Portrait of Jane Francis

Chancellor of the University of Leeds
- Incumbent
- Assumed office 9 July 2018
- Preceded by: Melvyn Bragg

Personal details
- Born: Jane Elizabeth Francis; October 1956 (age 69–70)
- Education: University of Southampton
- Awards: Polar Medal (2002); Dame Commander of the Order of St Michael and St George (2017)
- Website: Jane Francis at British Antarctic Survey
- Scientific career
- Fields: Palaeoclimatology
- Workplaces: British Antarctic Survey; University of Adelaide; University of Leeds
- Thesis: The fossil forests of the basal Purbeck formation (upper jurassic) of Dorset, Southern England (1982)

Professor Dame Jane Elizabeth Francis, DCMG FRS (born October 1956) is a British paleoclimatologist who is the Director of the British Antarctic Survey. She previously worked as Professor of Palaeoclimatology at the University of Leeds where she also was Dean of the Faculty of Environment. In 2002 she was the fourth woman to receive the Polar Medal for outstanding contribution to British polar research. She is currently the Chancellor of the University of Leeds.

== Education ==
Francis was educated at Simon Langton Girls' Grammar School in Canterbury, and received both her undergraduate degree in Geology and her PhD from the University of Southampton.

== Career ==
Francis was a NERC research student in geology/biology at Southampton University from 1979 until 1982. She continued on as a NERC Postdoctoral Research Fellow at Bedford College, London, until 1984. She was appointed to a position as Palaeobotanist at the British Antarctic Survey (BAS), from 1984 to 1986.

For five years Francis was a Postdoctoral Research Associate with Larry Frakes at the University of Adelaide. In 1991 she accepted a position as a lecturer in the Department of Earth Sciences at the University of Leeds UK; she was promoted to Senior Lecturer in 1996. In 2002, she was awarded the Polar Medal, becoming only the fourth woman in history to receive the award.

She was promoted to Professor of Palaeoclimatology in the School of Earth and Environment and was the Director for the Centre for Polar Science at the University of Leeds, before becoming Dean of the Faculty of Environment in 2008. She is an Honorary Professor at the University of Leeds. On 1 October 2013 Francis took up her post as Director of the British Antarctic Survey, becoming the first woman Director of the institution.

Francis's principal interests are in palaeoclimatology and palaeobotany. She specialises in the study of fossil plants, and their use as tools for climate interpretation and information about past biodiversity: for example, understanding past climate change during greenhouse and icehouse periods. Her research has emphasised the "Antarctic paradox," that although the Antarctic is largely inhospitable now, its abundant plant fossils indicate a drastically warmer past climate. She has undertaken more than 16 expeditions to the Arctic and Antarctic.

Francis was described by the Geological Society of London during the awarding of her Coke Medal as playing a "pivotal role in shaping and directing the Earth science carried out in polar regions, through her extensive service on a staggeringly wide range of national and international policy committees." She is also the first woman to chair the Operations Working Group of Antarctic Treaty Consultative Meetings, the international forum of nations concerned with legal and operational issues in Antarctica.

Francis holds a number of memberships of national and international scientific bodies. She is a member of the UK Natural Environment Research Council (NERC) Executive Board; member of the Scientific Advisory Group of the Swedish Polar Research Secretariat; Executive committee member of the European Polar Board; and UK Delegate to the international Scientific Committee on Antarctic Research.

== Awards ==
Francis's contributions have been recognised with numerous awards. Most notably, she was awarded the Polar Medal in 2002 for outstanding contribution to British polar research, presented by H.M. Elizabeth II, and was the fourth woman ever to receive the award.

She received an Honorary Doctorate of Science from the University of Leeds in 2014, as well as an Honorary Doctorate of Environmental Science from the University of Plymouth, also in 2014. In that same year she was named "Explorer Scientist" among 100 leading UK scientists by The Science Council. In 2013 she was elected as a fellow of Darwin College, Cambridge. She has also been awarded the Coke Medal from the Geological Society of London (2014); the President's Award of the Paleontological Society; the Antarctic Service Medal from the US National Science Foundation; and the Workplace Achievement Award from the BBC's 'eve' magazine, sponsored by Nivea.

In the 2017 New Year Honours, Francis was appointed Dame Commander of the Order of St Michael and St George (DCMG) for services to polar science and diplomacy.

In 2017, Francis became the seventh Chancellor of the University of Leeds, succeeding Melvyn Bragg. In December 2020 the British Antarctic Survey named a peak on Adelaide Island, Francis Peak, after her. She was elected a Fellow of the Royal Society in 2021.

Academic offices
Preceded by Melvyn Bragg	Chancellor of the University of Leeds; 2017–	Incumbent
