= Catherine Waddams =

British economist and academic

- Born: Catherine Mary Waddams; 12 July 1948 (age 78); London, England
- Other names: Catherine Mary Price; Catherine Waddams Price
- Title: Professor of Regulation
- Board member of: Water Services Regulation Authority (Ofwat)
- Spouses: F. Christopher Price (m. 1970; div. 1992) Morten Hviid (m. 1994)
- Children: Two

Academic background
- Education: Simon Langton Grammar School for Girls
- Alma mater: University of Nottingham
- Thesis: Marginal Cost Pricing in the Gas Industry

Academic work
- Discipline: Economics
- Sub-discipline: Industrial organization; Privatisation; Regulation; Competition
- School or tradition: 1973
- Institutions: University of Nottingham; Lanchester Polytechnic; Leicester Polytechnic; University of Leicester; Warwick Business School, University of Warwick; Norwich Business School, University of East Anglia

Catherine Mary Waddams (born 12 July 1948) is a British economist and academic, who specialises in industrial organization, privatisation, regulation, and competition. Since 2000, she has been Professor of Regulation at Norwich Business School, University of East Anglia. From 2000 to 2011, she served as the first director of the Centre of Competition and Regulation (later renamed Centre for Competition Policy) at the University of East Anglia.

== Early life and education ==
Waddams was born on 12 July 1948 in Lambeth, London, England. Her parents were Herbert Waddams, an Anglican priest and theologian, and Margaret Waddams (née Burgess). She was educated at Simon Langton Grammar School for Girls, a state grammar school in Canterbury, Kent. She then studied mathematics and economics at the University of Nottingham, graduating with an upper second class Bachelor of Science (BSc) degree in 1969. She remained at Nottingham to undertake postgraduate research in economics, and completed her Doctor of Philosophy (PhD) degree in 1973. Her doctoral thesis was titled Marginal Cost Pricing in the Gas Industry.

== Academic career ==
From 1969 to 1972, during her doctorate, Waddams was a research assistant to J E Mitchell at the University of Nottingham. She was then a lecturer in economics at Lanchester Polytechnic between 1972 and 1973, and at Leicester Polytechnic in 1974. In 1979, she joined the University of Leicester as a lecturer in economics; she was later promoted there to senior lecturer. From 1989 to 1994, she also served at Leicester as Dean of Social Sciences. In 1993, she was a visiting fellow at Clare Hall, Cambridge and the Department of Applied Economics at the University of Cambridge.

In 1995, Waddams joined the University of Warwick as a professor of the Warwick Business School and the first Director of its Centre for Management under Regulation. From January to June 1999, she was a visiting academic at the Centre for Industrial Economics of the University of Copenhagen. In 2000, she moved to the Norwich Business School of the University of East Anglia, where she had been appointed Professor of Regulation. From 2000 to 2011, she also served as the first director of the Centre of Competition and Regulation (later renamed Centre for Competition Policy).

=== Other work ===
From 2001 to 2009, Waddams was a member of the Competition Commission, a non-departmental public body of the UK Government. Since 1 May 2013, she has been a non-executive director of the Water Services Regulation Authority (Ofwat).

== Personal life ==
From 1970 to 1992, Waddams was married to F. Christopher Price. They had two children together, a son and a daughter, before divorcing. In 1994, she married Morten Hviid.

Waddams is an Anglican Christian. She is a Reader (a licensed lay minister) in the Diocese of Norwich, and has served at St George's Church, Colegate, Norwich since 2014.

== Selected works ==
- Price, Catherine M. (1977). Welfare Economics in Theory and Practice. London: Macmillan Press. ISBN 978-0333191224.
- Jackson, Peter M.; Price, Catherine M., eds. (1994). Privatisation and Regulation: A Review of the Issues. London: Longman. ISBN 978-0582009745.
- Ugaz, Cecilia; Price, Catherine Waddams, eds. (2003). Utility Privatization and Regulation: A Fair Deal for Consumers?. Northampton, MA: Edward Elgar Publishers. ISBN 978-1843762027.
