= Helen Armfield =

Helen Gertrude Armfield OBE (d. 1957) was an English hockey player and coach.

She was educated at the Bergman Österberg College for physical education, graduating in 1912.

Playing as a centre-half, Armfield coached hockey in England, Ireland, and the USA. In 1921, she was one of an All England Women's Hockey Association touring team to America. She stayed on to teach hockey and study Midwestern educational methods. She returned in 1922, leading a group of eight British coaches for a two-month stint teaching hockey at the request of the United States Field Hockey Association.

Armfield was the captain and President of the Southern Women's Hockey Association and held several positions in the AEWHA and the International Federation of Women’s Hockey Associations. In 1954, she received an OBE for her role as President of the AEWHA, which she held from 1949 until a month before her death in 1957.
