= Lilian Faithfull =

19th and 20th-century English educator and hockey player

Lilian Mary Faithfull
- Born: 12 March 1865; Hoddesdon, England
- Died: 2 May 1952 (aged 87); Cheltenham, England
- Occupations: University teacher and administrator
- Known for: Advocating women's right to university education

Lilian Mary Faithfull CBE (12 March 1865 – 2 May 1952) was an English teacher, headmistress, women's rights advocate, magistrate, social worker, and humanitarian. She was one of the "Steamboat ladies" who were part of the struggle for women to gain university education.

From 1889 until 1894 she was a lecturer at Royal Holloway College and then joined King's College London, where she succeeded Cornelia Schmitz as vice-principal of the Ladies Department for the next 13 years, a position she regarded as the happiest of her career. She was principal of Cheltenham Ladies' College from 1907 until 1922. In 1920, she became Justice of the Peace for Cheltenham, becoming one of the first women magistrates in England. Faithfull started the organisation that is now Lilian Faithfull Homes in Cheltenham, and she spent the last few months of her life in the care of one of the homes, Faithfull House, until her death in 1952.

== Early life and education ==
Lilian Faithfull was born in Hoddesdon, Hertfordshire, in 1865. Her father, Francis Faithfull, was a clerk at the Worshipful Company of Merchant Taylors. Her mother, Edith Lloyd, stayed home with eight children while also writing a History of England and magazine articles. Lilian was the second youngest of the six girls and two boys. She lived in an upper-middle class country house in Hertfordshire and was educated at The Grange in Hoddesdon (the only girl at the time), and later at home by her mother and governesses. Emily Faithfull, an early women's rights activist, was her cousin. Both of Faithfull's parents were opinionated about issues such as femininity and social class, but were not radicals.

Faithfull entered Somerville College of Oxford University in 1883, just four years after it was established. She was the first captain of the women's hockey team and the college tennis champion, and graduated with a first in English in 1887. She later claimed an ad eundem degree from Trinity College, Dublin in 1905.

== Career ==
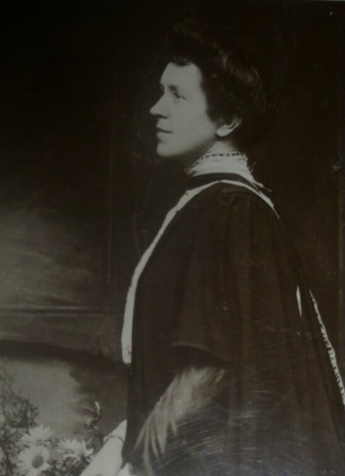
Faithfull in her first year at Cheltenham

Between 1887 and 1888, Faithfull taught at Oxford High School, and was secretary to the principal of Somerville, Madeleine Shaw Lefevre. From 1889 until 1894 she was a lecturer at Royal Holloway College and then joined King's College London, where she succeeded Cornelia Schmitz as vice-principal of the Ladies Department for the next 13 years. It was here that Virginia Woolf met her, and Faithfull described her position as "one of the happiest educational posts for women in England".

In 1890, Faithfull suggested that women who had competed for Oxford or Cambridge in intercollegiate sports should be awarded special badges like their male counterparts. This was implemented in 1891 and marked the start of the Lady Blue. Along with Margaret Gilliland and Sara Burstall, Faithfull believed that the important household topics of cookery, laundry and hygiene should feature as scientific subjects on the school curriculum. She wanted to get rid of the distinction between the professional woman and the women studying "home science".

"In recent years there has been a widespread movement to bring the education of our girls into relation with their work as home-makers. The old 'blue-stocking type', who prided herself on not knowing how to sew or mend, and who thought cooking menial and beneath her, no longer appeals to anyone ... We want our girls to grow up into sensible methodical, practical women, able to direct intelligently and practically the manifold duties of home." – Faithfull discussing her education policies in 1911.

In 1895, Faithfull became the first president of the Ladies' Hockey Association (later the All England Women's Hockey Association), and remained in that role until at least 1907.

In 1907, Faithfull became the principal of Cheltenham Ladies' College, succeeding Dorothea Beale. She remained in that position for 15 years. In 1920, she became Justice of the Peace for Cheltenham, becoming one of the first women magistrates in England. Faithfull was active as a social worker, improving social conditions for the poor in London, and was chair of a committee to improve nutrition in children. She founded the Old People's Housing Society in Cheltenham, later renamed the Lilian Faithfull Homes. Faithfull was the model for the Helen Butterfield character in The Constant Nymph, a 1924 novel by Margaret Kennedy (a former student of Cheltenham). She was a Fellow of King's College London and received an honorary MA from Oxford in 1925. In the 1926 Birthday Honours Faithfull was made a Commander of the Order of the British Empire. She never married.

Faithfull died on 2 May 1952 at Faithfull House, and was buried in Cheltenham.

== Bibliography ==
- 1903: Selections from the Poems of H. W. Longfellow. With an introduction by Lilian M. Faithfull
- 1908: School hymns for use in the Cheltenham Ladies' College
- 1923: Some Addresses
- 1924: In the House of My Pilgrimage (reprinted 1925), her memoirs of her time at Cheltenham Ladies' College
- 1927: You and I. Saturday talks at Cheltenham
- 1928: The Pilgrim and Other Poems
- 1940: The Evening Crowns the Day. Reminiscences.
