= Norwich Business School =

Norwich Business School (NBS) is one of seven schools within the University of East Anglia's Faculty of Social Sciences. The School has a campus location, based in the Thomas Paine Study Centre, and has approximately 1,800 registered students.

In the National Student Survey 2018, UEA was ranked 2nd in the UK for finance, 5th in the UK for business studies and 10th in the UK for marketing (overall satisfaction rankings).

In 2019, the School received an Athena SWAN Bronze award, recognising work undertaken to address gender equality in higher education and research.

== Research ==
UEA is ranked 9th in the UK for quality of its business and management studies research in the Research Excellence Framework 2014 (Times Higher Education Analysis).

== Projects ==
Graduate Job Programme

The Graduate Job Programme is a recruitment service offered by Norwich Business School for final year undergraduate students. Participants take part in a rigorous assessment centre experience before being matched with regional employers who are looking to recruit business graduates to their team on a nine-month to permanent basis.

Employability Prizes

Employability Prizes are built in to a number of modules at Norwich Business School. They give students the chance to present their academic work to a panel of employers, in order to gain feedback, networking opportunities and a prize for the winning team.

== Notable alumni ==
- Neil Doncaster, CEO of the Scottish Football League
- Sir Peter Fahy, Chief Constable of Greater Manchester Police
- Marcus Flather, cardiologist and recognised expert in clinical trials

== Notable Academics ==
- Amelia Fletcher, Professor of Competition Policy
- Catherine Waddams, Professor of Regulation

== History ==
The name Norwich Business School and acronym NBS was first adopted in 2005. Previously, NBS had been known as The School of Management, which was formed in 1996 by the alliance of the School of Management and the School of Accounting and Finance. Despite adopting Norwich Business School as the new name of the school, NBS continues to teach degree courses in these subject areas.
