= All England Women's Hockey Association =

Sports organisation (1895–1996)

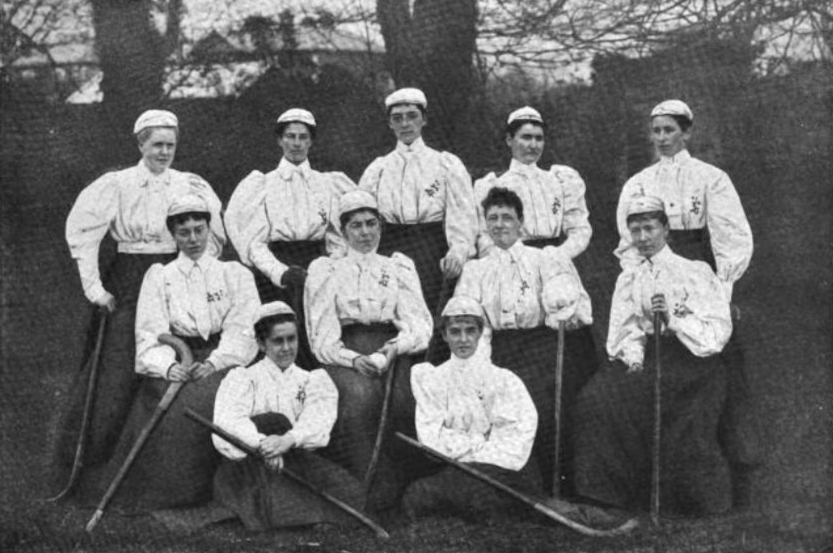
England women's national field hockey team in 1896. Captain E.G. Johnson is second from left in the middle row

The All England Women’s Hockey Association was the governing body of women’s field hockey in England from 1895 until it became part of the English Hockey Association in 1996.

== Origins ==
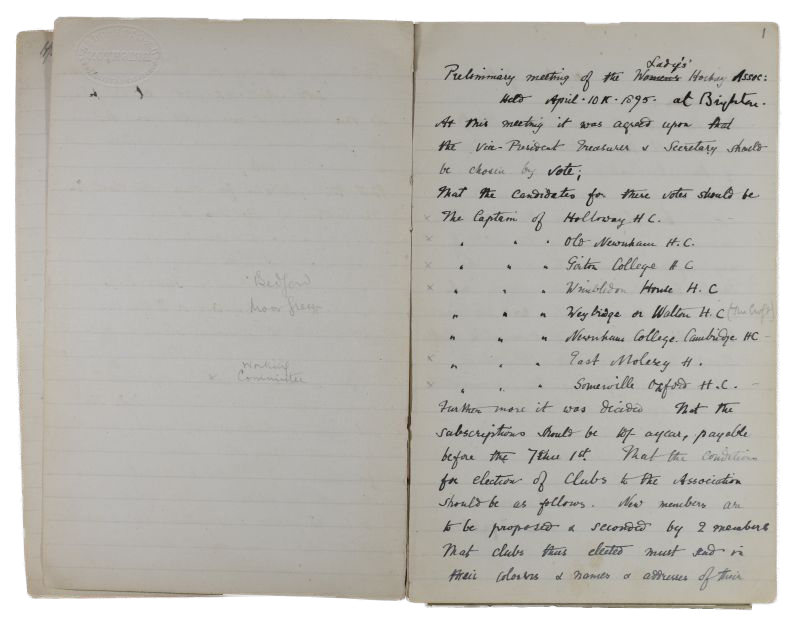
AEWHA minute-book from 1895

The Association, initially called the Ladies’ Hockey Association, was formed in 1895 by representatives of local, school and college hockey clubs after a successful friendly match against the Irish Ladies' Hockey Union. The original member clubs included several women’s college teams: Roedean School, Girton College Cambridge, Newnham College Cambridge, Somerville College Oxford, Royal Holloway, Bedford, and the East Molesey, Columbines and Croft Ladies’ Clubs. The first President was Lilian Faithfull, head of the Ladies’ Department of King’s College, London, with Isabella Jameson of Newnham College as vice-president and Christabel Lawrence as secretary and treasurer. The original committee also included Margaret Heneage, Miss Fletcher, Miss Marett and Miss Brunner. Emily Godschall Johnson of Molesey Ladies, also known as a tennis player, was appointed captain of the first national team, which was yet to be selected. The name was changed to the All England Women’s Hockey Association in 1896.

== History ==
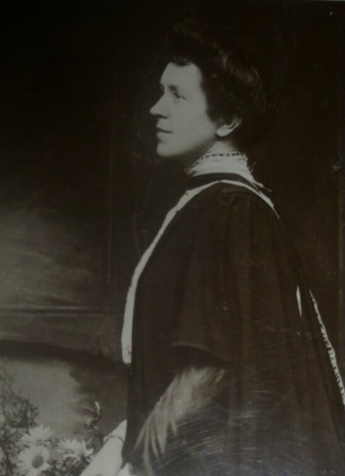
Lilian Faithfull, first President of the AEWHA

The first fixture of the AEWHA was played against the Irish Ladies’ Hockey Union in 1896. Regional competitions were established by 1898. Membership grew to over 300 school, college and private clubs within the first fifteen years.

Member Edith Thompson edited a weekly journal, The Hockey Field, from 1901–1920 and published a book on the practicalities and ideals of the AEWHA in 1904.

In 1927, the AEWHA under the presidency of Frances Heron-Maxwell contributed to the establishment of the International Federation of Women’s Hockey Associations. This merged with the Fédération Internationale de Hockey in the 1980s.

The AEWHA produced three instructional films on hockey coaching in the 1920s and 1930s.

In 1950, the AEWHA made an agreement with Wembley Stadium to stage international women’s matches there, which were broadcast until 1991.

In 1996, the AEWHA and the Hockey Association, which had refused to admit women as members in 1895, merged to form the England Hockey Association. The final President of the AEWHA was Monica Pickersgill, who became the first President of the new joint organisation.

== Presidents ==
- Lilian Faithfull (1895–1910)
- Geraldine Somerville (1910–1912)
- Frances Heron-Maxwell (1912–1922)
- Edith Thompson (1922–1929)
- Catherine Gaskell (1929–1931)
- Hilda Light (1931–1946)
- Edith Thompson (second term, 1946–7)
- Olga Gimson (1947–9)
- Helen Armfield (1949–1957)
- Doris Margaret Crisp
- Mary Russell Vick (1976–1986)
- Barbara Lambton Holland
- Monica Pickersgill
