= Roedean School =

Girls' school in Roedean near Brighton, East Sussex, England

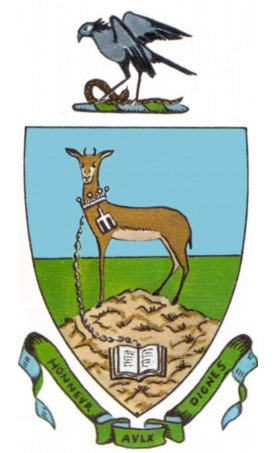

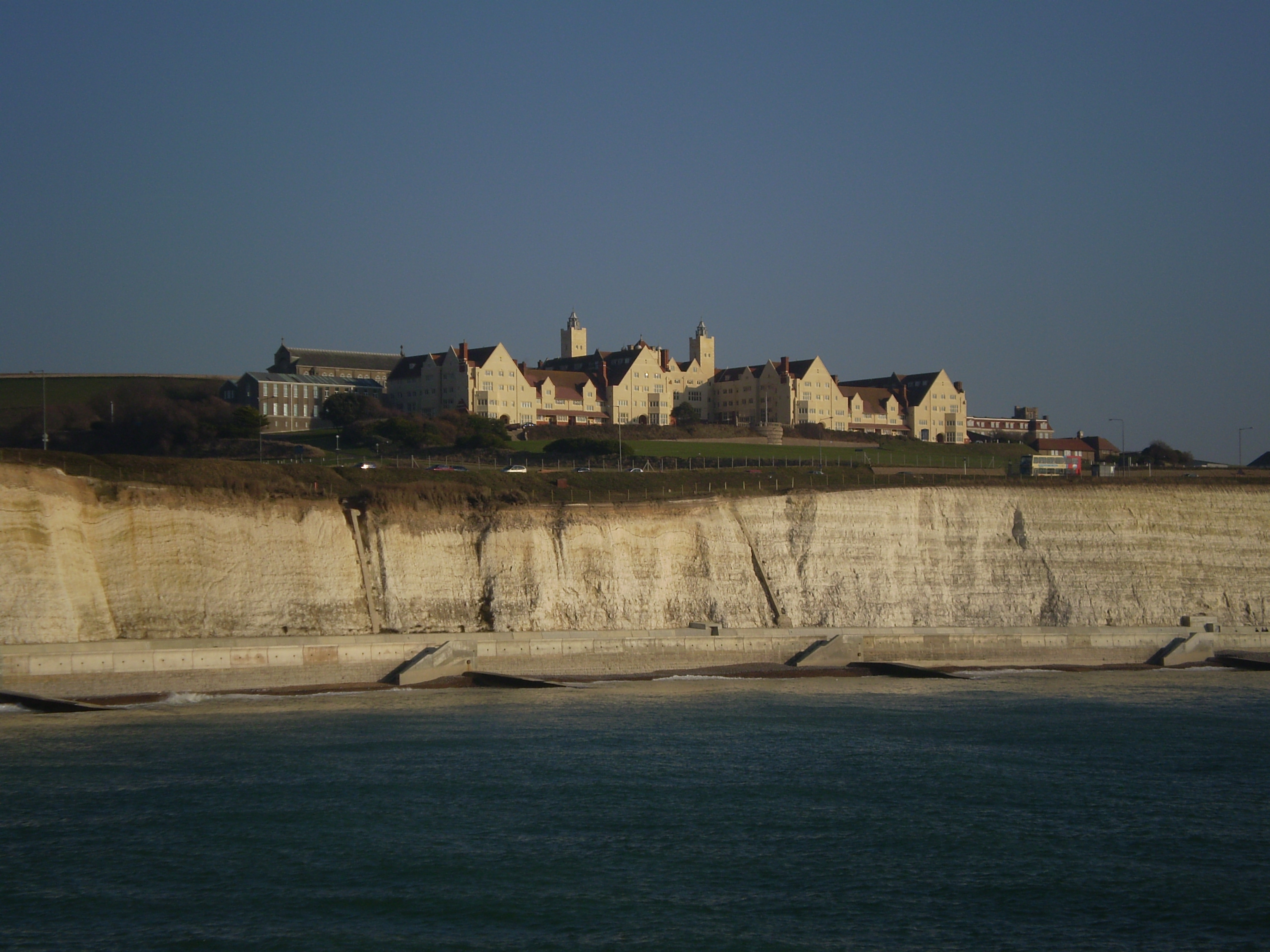

Location
- Roedean Way; Brighton, East Sussex, BN2 5RQ; England; 50.812°N 0.085°W

Information
- Type: Private day and boarding school
- Motto: Honneur aulx dignes ("Honour the worthy")
- Religious affiliation: Church of England
- Established: 1885
- Local authority: Brighton and Hove
- Department for Education URN: 114616 Tables
- President of Trustees: Lady Patten of Barnes
- Headmistress: Niamh Green
- Gender: Female
- Age: 11 to 18
- Enrolment: 600
- Houses: 6
- Colours: Blue and White
- Alumnae: Old Roedeanians
- Website: www.roedean.co.uk

Roedean (/ˈroʊdiːn/) is a private boarding school governed by royal charter on the outskirts of Brighton, United Kingdom. It was founded in 1885 by three sisters to educate wealthy daughters and heiresses of aristocracy and industrial elites of the 19th century.

It is a girls-only school for those between the ages of 11 and 18. The campus is situated near Sussex Downs, on a cliff overlooking the Brighton Marina and the English Channel. It is widely regarded as the equivalent of Eton for girls, having educated industrialists, ambassadors, stateswomen, civil leaders, artists, and famous writers.

The school is equipped with multiple dance studios, music classrooms, a private theatre, heated indoor swimming pools, private golf courses, farms, chapels, as well as a range of specialised workshops, studios, laboratories and sports pitches.

Roedean School is a member of the Girls' Schools Association and the Headmasters' and Headmistresses' Conference (HMC). The Independent Schools Inspectorate rated Roedean as Excellent in all areas (highest category) in its March 2016 inspection.

In the 2023 A-Levels, the school saw 55.2% of its candidates score A*/A.

== History ==
The school was founded in 1885 as Wimbledon House by three women: Penelope Lawrence and her step-sisters Millicent and Dorothy Lawrence. Their brother was the lawyer Sir Paul Lawrence of Wimbledon who became unable to support them. Their Lawrence great aunts had been noted school teachers earlier in the century, mainly in Liverpool. In its early years, Roedean was favoured by wealthy parents - many of whom were Nonconformists - to prepare girls for entrance to the newly opened women's colleges at Cambridge University, Girton (now co-ed) and Newnham Colleges where Penelope had studied. In 1898, the school moved to its present site, occupying new buildings designed by the architect Sir John Simpson. A sister school, also called Roedean School and co-founded by the youngest Lawrence sister, Theresa, in 1903, is located in Johannesburg, South Africa.

The school motto, Honneur aulx dignes, is in Norman French, and means "Honour the worthy". When pronounced, it sounds like "Honour Roedean".

In 1924 the Lawrence sisters were replaced by Emmeline Mary Tanner who became the new head. She had been poached from Bedford High School by Penelope Lawrence as their successor.

During the Second World War, the students and staff, including classics teacher Mary Creighton Bailey, were temporarily evacuated to Keswick, in the north of England. The school buildings in Brighton, Sussex were used by the Admiralty. They adapted it for use by Navy cadets attending the Mining and Torpedo School (known as HMS Vernon (R)). Roedean is one of the few girls' schools in the country to have an Old Boys' Association.

The artist Percy Shakespeare was killed by a German bomb while serving at Roedean.

=== Absorption of St Mary's Hall ===
Inspired by his friend William Carus Wilson, who founded Cowan Bridge School, Reverend Henry Venn Elliott proposed to found a similar school for the county. St Mary's Hall was opened in 1836 and was the second-oldest girls' school in the United Kingdom before it was closed in 2009. At that time, its junior section became Roedean's junior school while many senior girls transferred to Roedean. The junior school was closed in 2011 as the school administration decided to focus on secondary and sixth form education.

== Location ==
Roedean School is set in 118 acres (48 ha) of grounds off Roedean Way, at the top of a cliff on the Sussex Downs overlooking the sea, approximately in line with Brighton Marina.

== Academic results ==
In 2023, the school achieved 55% of all A-Level grades A*-A and 74.3% of GCSE grades 9-7.

== Houses ==
The school community is divided into houses.

The Lawrence and Tanner House (with Senior and Junior wings) system, introduced in 2005, was reversed starting in 2010. A numbered house system was reintroduced.

Year 7 to Year 11 students are spread out amongst Houses 1, 2, 3, and 4. These are named after the house numbers 1–4 of Lewes Crescent, where the School was located prior to moving in 1898 to this campus built for it.

Sixth form (Years 12–13) are admitted to Keswick House and Lawrence House, which are detached from the main school building.

In the 1960s, the houses were: Junior House; House Number 1; House Number 2; House Number 3; House Number 4; and a Sanatorium. In 1966 part of the Sanatorium was made into rooms for 6th form girls, two 6th form girls from every numbered house. The School retains a sanatorium wing (now known as a health centre) to this day.

== Admission procedures ==
Roedean is a selective school, and entry to the school is based upon the School's own entrance examinations, interviews and reports from the students' previous schools.

== Notable alumnae ==
Old Girls are known as Old Roedeanians and include:

=== Arts ===
- Vera Stanley Alder, painter
- Pauline Boumphrey, sculptor
- Enid Marx, designer
- Beatrix Ong, fashion accessories designer
- Phyllis Pearsall, artist, writer and publisher
- Clare Pooley, blogger and novelist
- Edith Pretty, philanthropist and magistrate
- Zina Saro-Wiwa, video artist and filmmaker
- Jillian Becker, author
- Dorothy Theomin, philanthropist and art collector

=== Business ===
- Marjorie Abbatt, toy-maker and businesswoman

=== Healthcare and education ===
- Dame Cicely Saunders, nurse, social worker, physician and writer
- Olive Willis, founder of Downe House School
- Barbara, Lady Stephen, educationalist and biographer

=== Journalism and literature ===
- Alison Adburgham, fashion editor of The Guardian, author and social historian
- Jani Allan, journalist, broadcaster
- Tessa Dahl, novelist and daughter of Roald Dahl
- Adèle Geras, writer
- Zerbanoo Gifford, writer and human rights campaigner
- Naseem Khan (activist), journalist and activist
- Noo Saro-Wiwa, author
- Nancy Spain, journalist, author and broadcaster
- Katharine Whitehorn, journalist, writer, and columnist

=== Military and sport ===
- Barbara Calder (1924–2018), yachtswoman
- Elizabeth Devereux-Rochester, member of SOE F Section
- Tanya Streeter, world champion freediver
- Philippa Tattersall, soldier and first female to complete the All Arms Commando Course
- Amber Anning British Athletics Record holder 400m and double Paris Olympics medallist

=== Politics and activism ===
- Ursula Graham Bower, anthropologist and guerrilla fighter in Burma during World War II
- Jill Braithwaite, Lady Braithwaite, anthropologist, diplomat and social reformer
- Anna Campbell, activist
- Lynda Chalker, Baroness Chalker, politician
- Dame Margaret Cole, politician and writer
- Flick Drummond, Conservative Party politician
- Helen Millar Craggs, suffragette
- Birgit Cunningham, campaigner
- Layla Moran, Liberal Democrat politician

=== Science ===
- Helen Dick Megaw, crystallographer

=== Theatre, television, and film ===
- Marisa Abela, actress
- Jill Balcon, actress
- Hermione Cockburn, broadcaster
- Noel Dyson, actress
- Lucy Griffiths, actress
- Rebecca Hall, actress
- Jessica Hester Hsuan, actress
- Verity Lambert, television producer, known for being the original producer of Doctor Who.
- Sarah Miles, actress
- Rhona Mitra, actress, model and singer-songwriter
- Honeysuckle Weeks, actress
- Perdita Weeks, actress

== See also ==
- Grade II listed buildings in Brighton and Hove: P–R
