= 66th General Assembly of Prince Edward Island =

2019–2023 Canadian legislative session

- Minority, then Majority parliament

Parliament leaders
- Premier: Dennis King
- Leader of the Opposition: Peter Bevan-Baker

Party caucuses
- Government: Progressive Conservative Party
- Opposition: Green Party
- Recognized: Liberal Party

Legislative Assembly
- Speaker of the Assembly: Colin LaVie
- Members: 27 MLA seats

Sovereign
- Monarch: Elizabeth II; 6 February 1952 – 8 September 2022
- Charles III; 8 September 2022 – present
- Lieutenant governor: Antoinette Perry; 20 October 2017 – 17 October 2024
← 65th	→ 67th

The 66th General Assembly of Prince Edward Island was the 66th sitting of the Legislative Assembly of Prince Edward Island and the 40th since confederation in 1873. The membership of the assembly was determined by the 2019 Prince Edward Island general election, where the Progressive Conservative Party of Prince Edward Island led by Dennis King won a plurality of seats. With a victory in a November 2020 by-election, King's PCs became a majority government.

== Seating plan ==
	Hudson	Trivers	MacKay	Thompson	Jameson	Deagle	Bell
	Aylward	Myers	KING	Compton	MacEwen	Fox	McLane
LaVie
	Bernard	Beaton	Lund	BEVAN-BAKER		GALLANT	McNeilly
	Howard	Altass	Hammarlund	Bell		Perry	Henderson

== Members of the General Assembly ==
Cabinet ministers are in bold, party leaders are in italic, and the Speaker of the Legislative Assembly is designated by a dagger (†).

Name	Party	Riding	First elected / previously elected
**Ernie Hudson**	Progressive Conservative	Alberton-Bloomfield	2019
**Darlene Compton**	Progressive Conservative	Belfast-Murray River	2015
**Jamie Fox**	Progressive Conservative	Borden-Kinkora	2015
**Dennis King**	Progressive Conservative	Brackley-Hunter River	2019
Hannah Bell	Green	Charlottetown-Belvedere	2017
Ole Hammarlund	Green	Charlottetown-Brighton	2019
Natalie Jameson	Progressive Conservative	Charlottetown-Hillsborough Park	2019
Karla Bernard	Green	Charlottetown-Victoria Park	2019
Gord McNeilly	Liberal	Charlottetown-West Royalty	2019
Robert Mitchell (until September 3, 2020)	Liberal	Charlottetown-Winsloe	2007
Zack Bell (from November 2, 2020)	Progressive Conservative	Charlottetown-Winsloe	2020
Heath MacDonald (until August 18, 2021)	Liberal	Cornwall-Meadowbank	2015
Mark McLane (from November 15, 2021)	Progressive Conservative	Cornwall-Meadowbank	2021
Sonny Gallant*	Liberal	Evangeline-Miscouche	2007
**Steven Myers**	Progressive Conservative	Georgetown-Pownal	2011
**Matthew MacKay**	Progressive Conservative	Kensington-Malpeque	2015
Michele Beaton	Green	Mermaid-Stratford	2019
Cory Deagle	Progressive Conservative	Montague-Kilmuir	2019
Sidney MacEwen	Progressive Conservative	Morell-Donagh	2015
Peter Bevan-Baker	Green	New Haven-Rocky Point	2015
Robert Henderson	Liberal	O'Leary-Inverness	2007
**Brad Trivers**	Progressive Conservative	Rustico-Emerald	2015
Colin LaVie	Progressive Conservative	Souris-Elmira	2011
**Bloyce Thompson**	Progressive Conservative	Stanhope-Marshfield	2019
**James Aylward**	Progressive Conservative	Stratford-Keppoch	2011
Steve Howard	Green	Summerside-South Drive	2019
Lynne Lund	Green	Summerside-Wilmot	2019
Hal Perry	Liberal	Tignish-Palmer Road	2011 (Note: First elected as a Progressive Conservative)
Trish Altass	Green	Tyne Valley-Sherbrooke	2019

[*] Gallant is serving as the legislative leader for the Liberals, as the Liberal party leader Sharon Cameron has no seat in the legislature.

== Party membership ==
Number of members per party by date	2019		2020		2021	
Number of members per party by date	April 23	July 15	September 3	November 2	August 18	November 15
Progressive Conservative	12	13		14		15
Green	8					
Liberal	6		5		4	
Total members	26	27	26	27	26	27
Vacant	1	0	1	0	1	0
Government Majority	–2	–1	0	1	2	3

=== Membership changes ===
Membership changes in the 66th Assembly
Date	Name	District	Party	Reason
April 23, 2019	See List of Members			Election day of the 2019 Prince Edward Island general election
July 15, 2019	Natalie Jameson	Charlottetown-Hillsborough Park	Progressive Conservative	Won in deferred 2019 election extension
September 3, 2020	Robert Mitchell	Charlottetown-Winsloe	Liberal	Resigned, after thirteen years in political service for both provincial districts.
November 2, 2020	Zack Bell	Charlottetown-Winsloe	Progressive Conservative	Won by–election
August 18, 2021	Heath MacDonald	Cornwall-Meadowbank	Liberal	Resigned, to run in the 2021 Canadian federal election, for Malpeque riding.
November 15, 2021	Mark McLane	Cornwall-Meadowbank	Progressive Conservative	Won by–election

== See also ==
- List of Prince Edward Island General Assemblies
