= List of Green politicians who have held office in Canada =

This is a list of politicians who are Green Party of Canada members and have elected to office in Canada. Or members of the various provincial and territorial green parties who hold office in Canada. With the exception of those who sit in the Parliament of Canada, British Columbia Legislature, New Brunswick Legislature, the Legislative Assembly of Ontario and the Prince Edward Island Legislature most of these politicians have held municipal office in cities where there are no political parties. While these individuals are members of the Green Party in their personal life and may have been supported by Party members, they were not elected as Green party members.

== A ==
Name	Area	Office	Other	Citation	Current/Former
Tom Adams	Oakville	Oakville Town Councillor			C
Trish Altass	Tyne Valley-Sherbrooke	Legislative Assembly of Prince Edward Island			F
Kevin Arseneau	Kent North	Legislative Assembly of New Brunswick			F
Jenica Atwin	Fredericton	Member of the Canadian Parliament	Cross the floor to the Liberal Party of Canada		F

== B ==
Name	Area	Office	Other	Citation	Current/Former
Lisa Barrett	Mayor Bowen Island Municipality - Regional Director GVRD/Metrovan Board 1999-2006	Mayor			F
Lara Beckett	Regional District of Fraser – Fort George	Regional Director			C
Michele Beaton	Mermaid-Stratford	Legislative Assembly of Prince Edward Island			F
Bob Bell	Guelph, Ontario	City Councillor			F
Hannah Bell	Charlottetown-Parkdale	Legislative Assembly of Prince Edward Island	Formerly ran the PEI Business Women's Association		F
Karla Bernard	Charlottetown-Victoria Park	Legislative Assembly of Prince Edward Island	Former Interim Leader of the Green Party of Prince Edward Island		C
Peter Bevan-Baker	New Haven-Rocky Point	Legislative Assembly of Prince Edward Island	Former Leader of the Green Party of Prince Edward Island		C
Rob Botterell	Saanich North and the Islands	Legislative Assembly of British Columbia			F
Bridget Burns	Vancouver	Vancouver City Councillor			C

== C ==
Name	Area	Office	Other	Citation	Current/Former
Adriane Carr	Vancouver	City Councillor	Former Deputy leader of the Green Party of Canada		F
Roslyn Cassells	Vancouver	Park Board Commissioner			F
Lois Chan-Pedley	Vancouver	School Board Trustee			C
Sonya Chandler	Victoria	City Councillor			F
David Chernushenko	Ottawa	Ottawa City Councillor	Former Deputy Leader of the Green Party of Canada		F
Aislinn Clancy	Kitchener	Member of Provincial Parliament for Kitchener Centre	Kitchener City Councillor (2022–2023)	Deputy Leader of the Green Party of Ontario	C
David Coon	Fredericton-Lincoln	Legislative Assembly of New Brunswick	Leader of the Green Party of New Brunswick		C

== D ==
Name	Area	Office	Other	Citation	Current/Former
Dave Demers	Vancouver	Vancouver Park Board			F
Elio Di Iorio	Richmond Hill	Richmond Hill Town Councillor	Former International Secretary of the Green Party of Canada		F
Tom Digby	Vancouver	Vancouver Park Board			C
Camil Dumont	Vancouver	Vancouver City Councillor	Former Vancouver Park Board member		C

== F ==
Name	Area	Office	Other	Citation	Current/Former
Janet Fraser	Vancouver	Vancouver School Board Trustee			C
Sonia Furstenau	Cowichan Valley	Legislative Assembly of British Columbia	Former Leader of the Green Party of British Columbia		F
Pete Fry	Vancouver	Mayor of Vancouver	Former Vancouver City Councillor; first Green mayor of Vancouver		C

== G ==
Name	Area	Office	Other	Citation	Current/Former
Rick Goldring	Burlington, Ontario	Mayor			F
Estrellita Gonzalez	Vancouver	Vancouver School Board Trustee			F

== H ==
Name	Area	Office	Other	Citation	Current/Former
Ole Hammarlund	Charlottetown-Brighton	Legislative Assembly of Prince Edward Island			F
Dick Hibma	Owen Sound	City Councillor			F
Patty Higgins	Saint John, New Brunswick	City Councillor			F
Steve Howard	Summerside-South Drive	Legislative Assembly of Prince Edward Island			F
Bruce Hyer	Thunder Bay-Superior North	Member of Canadian Parliament	Elected as an NDP MP in 2008 and 2011, crossed the floor to the Green Party in 2013 and served as Deputy leader from 2014-2018. Ran for re-election in 2015 and 2019 but lost.		F

== J ==
Name	Area	Office	Other	Citation	Current/Former
Carla Johnson	Waterloo	Waterloo Region District School Board Trustee			C
Rylund Johnson	Yellowknife North	Legislative Assembly of the Northwest Territories	As the Legislative Assembly is a nonpartisan consensus government, Johnson sits as an Independent.		F

== K ==
Name	Area	Office	Other	Citation	Current/Former
Joe Keithley	Burnaby	Burnaby City Council			C
Jonathan Kerr	Comox	Comox Town Council			C

== L ==
Name	Area	Office	Other	Citation	Current/Former
Maggie Laidlaw	Guelph, Ontario	City Councillor			F
Emily Lowan	Saanich North and the Islands	Legislative Assembly of British Columbia	Leader of the Green Party of British Columbia		C
Philippe Lucas	Victoria	City Councillor			F
Lynne Lund	Summerside-Wilmot	Legislative Assembly of Prince Edward Island	Deputy leader of the Green Party of Prince Edward Island		F

== M ==
Name	Area	Office	Other	Citation	Current/Former
Matt MacFarlane	Borden-Kinkora	Member of the Legislative Assembly of Prince Edward Island	Leader of the Prince Edward Island Green Party. Winner of the 2024 Borden-Kinkora provincial by-election which made the Greens equal in size with the Liberal Official opposition (3 seats each).		C
Stuart Mackinnon	Vancouver	Park Board Commissioner	Served on the park board, was defeated, than elected to the board once more.		F
Paul Manly	Nanaimo—Ladysmith	Member of Parliament	The son of the former New Democratic MP Jim Manly; Joined the Green Party in 2015 after he was blocked by his own party, over his stance with the Israeli–Palestinian conflict. He ran for the Green Party in that federal election, finishing in fourth place. It took a second time to finally get elected in the May 6, 2019 by-election.		F
Alisha Masongsong	Vancouver	Vancouver School Board			C
Elizabeth May	Saanich—Gulf Islands	Member of Parliament	Leader of the Green Party of Canada from 2006 to 2019. Parliamentary Leader of the Green Party since 2019.		C
Megan Mitton	Tantramar	Legislative Assembly of New Brunswick	Leader-designate of the Green Party of New Brunswick		C
Mike Morrice	Kitchener Centre	Member of Parliament	First Green MP from Ontario.		F

== N ==
Name	Area	Office	Other	Citation	Current/Former
Pierre Nantel	Longueuil—Saint-Hubert	Member of Parliament	Nantel was elected as a NDP candidate in 2011, and re-elected in 2015. On August 19, 2019, he announced he was joining the Green party and would be running as its candidate in Longueuil—Saint-Hubert for the 2019 election.		F

== O ==
Name	Area	Office	Other	Citation	Current/Former
Josie Osborne	Tofino	Mayor	Later defected to the NDP and was elected as an NDP MLA during the 2020 British Columbia general election.		F
Adam Olsen	Saanich North and the Islands	Legislative Assembly of British Columbia			F

== R ==
Name	Area	Office	Other	Citation	Current/Former
Angela Nagy (nee Reid)	Kelowna	City Councillor	Former deputy leader of the Green Party of British Columbia		F
Annette Reilly	Vancouver	Vancouver City Councillor			C

== S ==
Name	Area	Office	Other	Citation	Current/Former
Dianne Saxe	Toronto	City Councillor	Former deputy leader of the Green Party of Ontario (2020–2022) and former Environmental Commissioner of Ontario		C
Victoria Serda	Saugeen Shores	Councillor	Former deputy leader of the Green Party of Ontario		F
Mike Schreiner	Guelph	Member of Provincial Parliament	Leader of the Green Party of Ontario		C
Andy Shadrack	Regional District of Central Kootenay	Electoral Area "D" Director			F
Erin Shapero	Markham	City Councillor			F
Jane Sterk	Esquimalt	City Councillor	Former BC Green Party leader		F
Rob Strang	Orangeville	Town Councillor	Former Deputy leader of the Green Party of Ontario		F
John Streicker	Whitehorse, Yukon	Whitehorse City Councillor	Former President of the Green Party of Canada. Switched to Yukon Liberal Party.		F
Julie Strilesky	Vancouver	Vancouver School Board			C
Breanne Smart	Vancouver	Vancouver Park Board			C
Stephanie Smith	Vancouver	Vancouver City Councillor			C

== T ==
Name	Area	Office	Other	Citation	Current/Former
Richard Thomas	Armour Township	Reeve	Died while in office.		F

== V ==
Name	Area	Office	Other	Citation	Current/Former
Art Vanden Berg	Victoria	City Councillor			F
Spencer Van Vloten	Vancouver	Vancouver Park Board			C
Jeremy Valeriote	West Vancouver-Sea to Sky	Legislative Assembly of British Columbia			C

== W ==
Name	Area	Office	Other	Citation	Current/Former
Andrew Weaver	Oak Bay-Gordon Head	Legislative Assembly of British Columbia	Former Leader of the Green Party of British Columbia		F
Paddy Weston	Kimberley	City Councillor			F
Michael Wiebe	Vancouver	Vancouver City Council			F
Tayte Willows	Cornwall-Meadowbank	Legislative Assembly of Prince Edward Island			C
Blair Wilson	West Vancouver—Sunshine Coast—Sea to Sky Country	Member of Parliament	Joined the Green Party in 2008 as a sitting member of parliament.		F

== Z ==
Name	Area	Office	Other	Citation	Current/Former
Judy Zaichkowsky	Vancouver	Vancouver School Board Trustee			F
