= 2023 Prince Edward Island general election =

Canadian provincial election

- 3 April 2023

All 27 seats in the Legislative Assembly of Prince Edward Island 14 seats needed for a majority
- Opinion polls
- Turnout: 68.5%▼
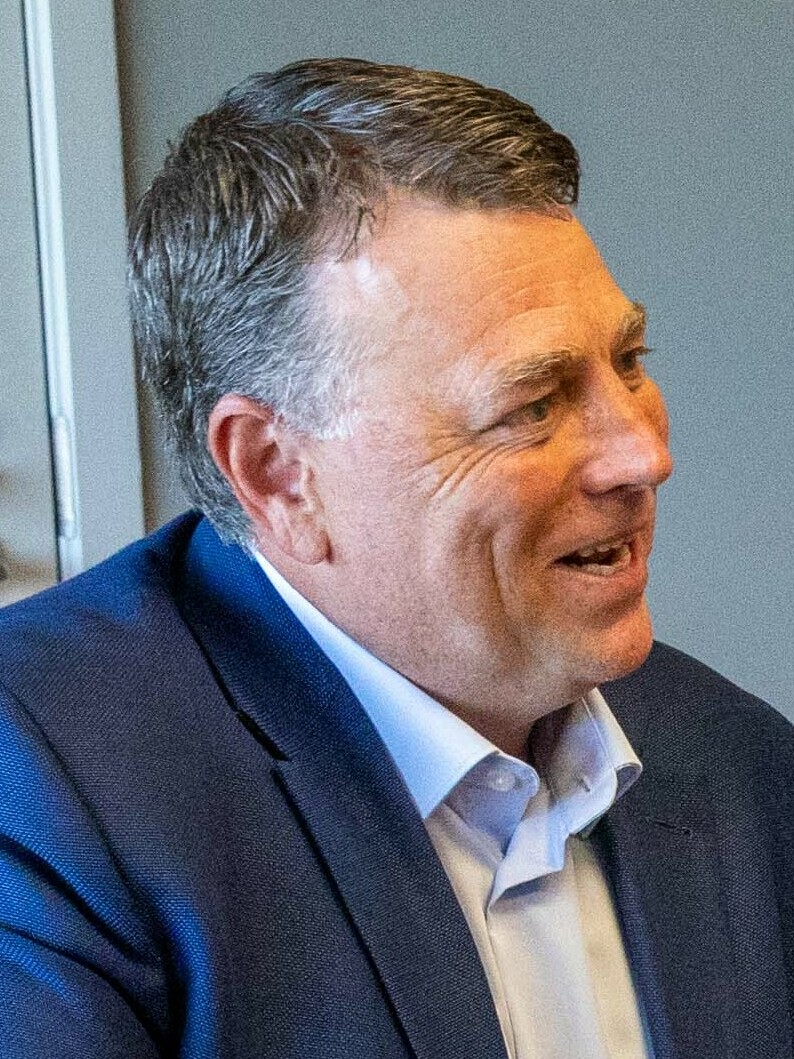

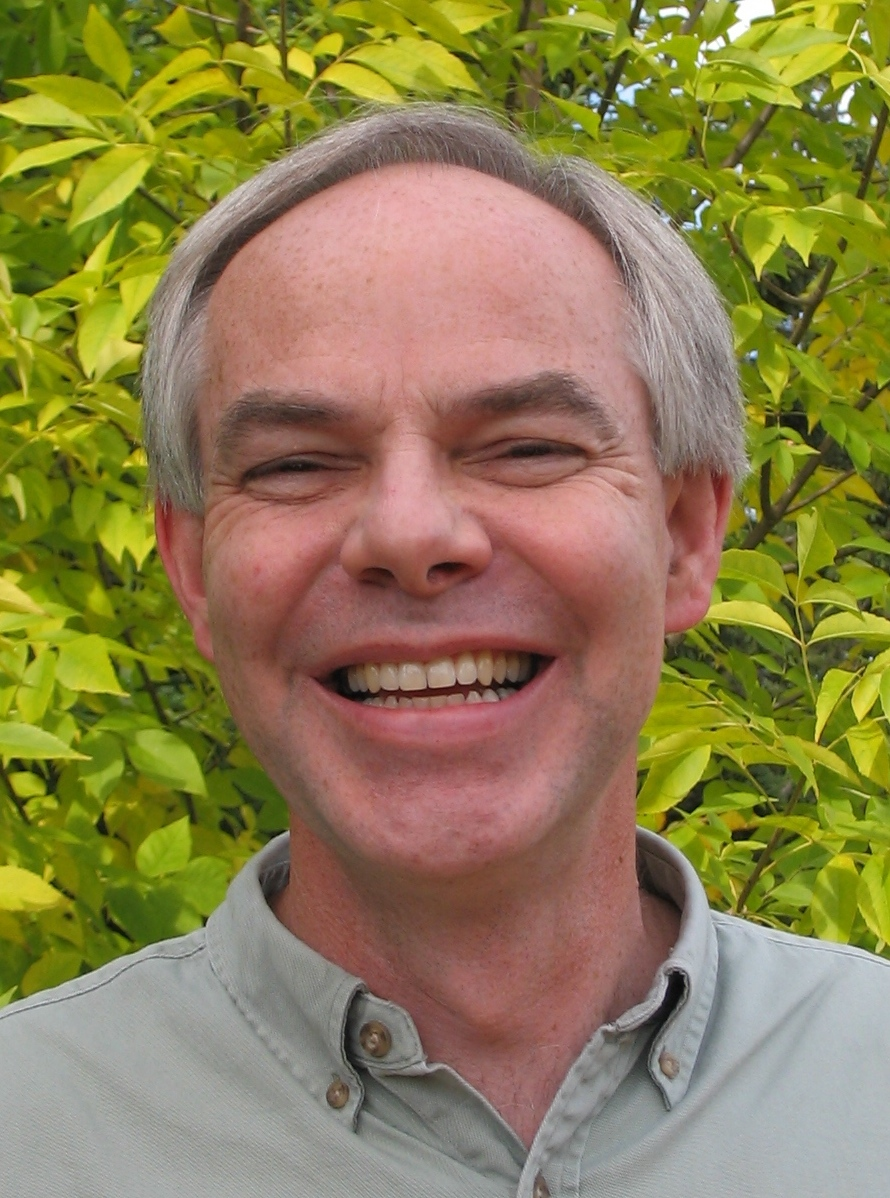
	First party	Second party	Third party
		LIB
Leader	Dennis King	Sharon Cameron	Peter Bevan-Baker
Party	Progressive Conservative	Liberal	Green
Leader since	9 February 2019	19 November 2022	3 November 2012
Leader's seat	Brackley-Hunter River	Ran in New Haven-Rocky Point (lost)	New Haven-Rocky Point
Last election	13 seats, 36.73% (Note: Includes results from the deferred election in Charlottetown-Hillsborough Park.)	6 seats, 29.40%	8 seats, 30.56%
Seats before	15	4	8
Seats won	22	3	2
Seat change	▲7	▼1	▼6
Popular vote	41,828	12,876	16,133
Percentage	55.92%	17.21%	21.57%
Swing	▲19.19%	▼12.19%	▼8.99%
Premier before election
Dennis King
Progressive Conservative
Premier after election
Dennis King
Progressive Conservative

The 2023 Prince Edward Island general election was held to elect the members of the 67th General Assembly of Prince Edward Island on 3 April 2023. The election normally required by 2 October under Prince Edward Island's fixed election date legislation was called early by Premier Dennis King at his nomination meeting on 6 March.

The Progressive Conservatives under incumbent Premier Dennis King won a majority government, gaining a combined seven seats from the Liberal and Green parties. The Liberals won three seats and became the Official Opposition, replacing the Greens who held two of their seats; however, newly acclaimed Liberal leader Sharon Cameron challenged Green leader Peter Bevan-Baker for his own seat and lost, placing third behind Bevan-Baker and the PC candidate. Following the election, Cameron and Bevan-Baker resigned as leaders of their respective parties.

The New Democratic Party ran candidates in all 27 districts, and the Island Party officially registered for the first time since the 2011 election, running candidates in 11 districts. Neither party elected any members to the Legislature. Voter turnout of 68.5% was the province's lowest recorded for a general election since Elections PEI began keeping records in 1966.

== Background ==
Prince Edward Island's fixed election date legislation calls for a general election to be held prior to the first Monday of October in the fourth calendar year subsequent to the previous general election, which would have required an election to be held by 2 October. Instead, the election was called early for 3 April.

=== Incumbents not standing for re-election ===
The following MLAs announced that they would not run in the 2023 provincial election (Ole Hammarlund lost a contested nomination for his seat):

Retiring incumbent		Electoral district	Subsequent party nominee	Elected MLA
Colin LaVie	Progressive Conservative	Souris-Elmira	Robin Croucher	Robin Croucher
James Aylward	Progressive Conservative	Stratford-Keppoch	Jill Burridge	Jill Burridge
Hannah Bell	Green	Charlottetown-Belvedere	Joanna Morrison	Susie Dillon
Ole Hammarlund	Green	Charlottetown-Brighton	Janice Harper	Rob Lantz
Sonny Gallant	Liberal	Evangeline-Miscouche	Pat MacLellan	Gilles Arsenault

=== Timeline ===
- 23 April 2019: General election held. The Progressive Conservative Party wins the most seats, while the incumbent Liberal Party falls to third place. The Green Party becomes the Opposition.
- 26 April 2019: Outgoing Premier Wade MacLauchlan announces intention to resign leadership of the Liberal Party upon appointment of an interim leader.
- 8 May 2019: Robert Mitchell is appointed interim Liberal leader.
- 9 May 2019: Dennis King's Progressive Conservative government is sworn in, following the resignation of Wade MacLauchlan's Liberal government.
- 13 June 2019: Deferred election date announced for Charlottetown-Hillsborough Park.
- 6 July 2019: Advance voting in Charlottetown-Hillsborough Park deferred election began, also took place on 8 and 12 July.
- 15 July 2019: Charlottetown-Hillsborough Park deferred election held, Progressive Conservative candidate Natalie Jameson is elected.
- 9 September 2019: Robert Mitchell resigns as interim Liberal leader.
- 16 September 2019: Sonny Gallant is appointed interim Liberal leader.
- 1 September 2020: Joe Byrne resigns as leader of the New Democratic Party.
- 23 April 2022: Michelle Neill is elected leader of the New Democratic Party.
- 19 November 2022: Sharon Cameron is acclaimed leader of the Liberal Party, being the only candidate in the party's leadership election.
- 6 March 2023: Dennis King is nominated as the PC candidate for Brackley-Hunter River, and announces that the election will be held on 3 April.
- 3 April 2023: General election held. Progressive Conservatives win a majority government.

=== Changes in MLAs ===
Changes in seats held (2019–2023)
Seat	Before				Change		
Seat	Date	Member	Party	Reason	Date	Member	Party
Charlottetown-Winsloe	3 September 2020	Robert Mitchell	█ Liberal	Resigned from Legislature	2 November 2020	Zack Bell	█ PC
Cornwall-Meadowbank	18 August 2021	Heath MacDonald	█ Liberal	Resigned to run in Malpeque in the 2021 Canadian federal election.	15 November 2021	Mark McLane	█ PC

== Results ==
Summary of the Legislative Assembly of Prince Edward Island election results
Party	Party leader	Candidates	Seats				Popular vote		
Party	Party leader	Candidates	2019	Dissol.	2023	Change	#	%	Change
Progressive Conservative	Dennis King	27	13	15	22	+9	41,828	55.92	+19.19
Green	Peter Bevan-Baker	25	8	8	2	−6	16,133	21.57	−8.99
Liberal	Sharon Cameron	25	6	4	3	−3	12,876	17.21	−12.19
New Democratic	Michelle Neill	27	0	0	0	0	3,359	4.49	+1.53
Island	Cecile Sly (Ahava Kálnássy de Kálnás)	11	0	0	0	0	411	0.55	+0.55
Independent		4	0	0	0	0	184	0.25	−0.09
Blank and invalid ballots									
Total		92	27	27	27	0		100	0
Registered voters / turnout									

Popular vote
PC	55.92%
Green	21.57%
Liberal	17.21%
New Democratic	4.49%
Others	0.80%

Seats summary
PC	81.48%
Liberal	11.11%
Green	7.41%

=== Synopsis of results ===
2023 PEI general election - synopsis of riding results, grouped by federal riding
Riding	2019	Winning party					Turnout (Note: including spoilt ballots)	Votes (Note: minor political parties receiving less than 1% of the national popular vote are aggregated under "Other"; independent candidates are aggregated separately)						
Riding	2019	Party	Votes	Share	Margin #	Margin %	Turnout	PC	Green	Lib	NDP	Island	Ind	Total
Cardigan
Belfast-Murray River	PC	PC	1,510	58.7%	990	38.5%	65.8%	1,510	419	520	124	–	–	2,574
Georgetown-Pownal	PC	PC	1,961	69.8%	1,609	57.3%	73.0%	1,961	352	340	79	78	–	2,810
Mermaid-Stratford	Grn	PC	1,245	45.3%	38	1.4%	68.8%	1,245	1,207	254	43	–	–	2,749
Montague-Kilmuir	PC	PC	1,847	70.2%	1,468	55.8%	66.7%	1,847	379	271	38	38	58	2,631
Morell-Donagh	PC	PC	1,899	70.6%	1,550	57.6%	68.1%	1,899	349	282	115	44	–	2,689
Souris-Elmira	PC	PC	1,593	55.4%	836	29.1%	75.8%	1,593	757	481	29	16	–	2,876
Stanhope-Marshfield	PC	PC	2,209	79.6%	1,643	59.2%	65.8%	2,209	–	–	566	–	–	2,775
Stratford-Keppoch	PC	PC	1,479	52.3%	632	22.4%	72.0%	1,479	847	471	32	–	–	2,829
Malpeque
Borden-Kinkora	PC	PC	1,719	60.1%	724	25.3%	67.7%	1,719	995	–	83	61	–	2,858
Brackley-Hunter River	PC	PC	1,903	68.2%	1,420	50.9%	70.2%	1,903	483	321	83	–	–	2,790
Cornwall-Meadowbank	Lib	PC	1,750	54.8%	975	30.6%	68.4%	1,750	775	611	60	–	–	3,196
Kensington-Malpeque	PC	PC	2,294	76.6%	1,831	61.1%	70.7%	2,294	463	169	67	–	–	2,993
New Haven-Rocky Point	Grn	Grn	1,457	42.8%	106	3.2%	75.4%	1,351	1,457	502	49	49	–	3,408
Rustico-Emerald	PC	PC	1,990	62.5%	1,431	44.9%	70.8%	1,990	559	532	102	–	–	3,183
Charlottetown
Charlottetown-Belvedere	Grn	PC	1,418	51.1%	779	28.1%	66.7%	1,418	639	560	133	25	–	2,775
Charlottetown-Brighton	Grn	PC	1,171	43.0%	307	11.3%	68.4%	1,171	864	487	202	–	–	2,724
Charlottetown-Hillsborough Park	PC	PC	1,660	61.9%	1,137	42.4%	63.2%	1,660	523	352	125	21	–	2,681
Charlottetown-Victoria Park	Grn	Grn	1,052	42.0%	74	3.0%	60.8%	978	1,052	293	150	32	–	2,505
Charlottetown-West Royalty	Lib	Lib	1,207	45.1%	165	6.2%	64.2%	1,042	301	1,207	63	28	36	2,677
Charlottetown-Winsloe	Lib	PC	1,861	60.6%	1,308	42.6%	71.4%	1,861	553	540	78	–	41	3,073
Egmont
Alberton-Bloomfield	PC	PC	1,532	57.6%	636	23.9%	73.6%	1,532	132	896	102	–	–	2,662
Evangeline-Miscouche	Lib	PC	1,384	61.7%	841	37.5%	69.4%	1,384	271	543	45	–	–	2,243
O'Leary-Inverness	Lib	Lib	894	37.2%	156	6.5%	71.2%	738	72	894	702	–	–	2,406
Summerside-South Drive	Green	PC	1,378	53.3%	639	24.7%	57.7%	1,378	739	397	70	–	–	2,584
Summerside-Wilmot	Green	PC	1,651	56.7%	670	23.0%	66.8%	1,651	981	214	45	19	–	2,910
Tignish-Palmer Road	Lib	Lib	1,527	58.7%	588	22.6%	75.5%	939	–	1,527	137	–	–	2,603
Tyne Valley-Sherbrooke	Green	PC	1,326	51.2%	362	14.0%	64.9%	1,326	964	212	37	–	49	2,588

= open seat
= turnout is above provincial average
= incumbent re-elected in same riding
= incumbency arose from byelection gain
= other incumbent renominated

Resulting composition of the 67th General Assembly of Prince Edward Island
Source		Party			
Source		PC	Lib	Grn	Total
Seats retained	Incumbents returned	11	3	2	16
Seats retained	Open seats held	2			2
Seats changing hands	Incumbents defeated	4			4
Seats changing hands	Open seats gained	3			3
Seats changing hands	Byelection gains held	2			2
Total		22	3	2	27

== Seats changing hands ==
=== MLAs who lost their seats ===
Party	Name	Riding	Year elected	Seat held by party since	Defeated by	Party
Green	Michele Beaton	Mermaid-Stratford	2019	2019	Jenn Redmond	Progressive Conservative
Green	Steve Howard	Summerside-South Drive	2019	2019	Barb Ramsay	Progressive Conservative
Green	Lynne Lund	Summerside-Wilmot	2019	2019	Tyler DesRoches	Progressive Conservative
Green	Trish Altass	Tyne Valley-Sherbrooke	2019	2019	Hilton MacLennan	Progressive Conservative

=== Open seats changing hands ===
Party in 2019	Candidate	Retiring incumbent	Constituency	Defeated by	Party
Green	Joanna Morrison	Hannah Bell	Charlottetown-Belvedere	Susie Dillon	Progressive Conservative
Green	Janice Harper	Ole Hammarlund	Charlottetown-Brighton	Rob Lantz	Progressive Conservative
Liberal	Pat MacLellan	Sonny Gallant	Evangeline-Miscouche	Gilles Arsenault	Progressive Conservative

== Candidates ==
- Party leaders' names are in **bold**; cabinet ministers' names are in italics.
- Incumbents who didn't run for re-election are denoted with a dagger †.

=== Cardigan ===
Electoral district	Candidates						Incumbent
Electoral district	PC	Green	Liberal	NDP	Island	Independent	Incumbent
4. Belfast-Murray River	Darlene Compton	Laverne MacInnes	Katherine Bryson	Michelle Hodgson			Darlene Compton
2. Georgetown-Pownal	Steven Myers	Patrick Brothers	Allister Veinot	Edith Perry	Lucy Robbins		Steven Myers
5. Mermaid-Stratford	Jenn Redmond	Michele Beaton	Gail MacDonald	Lawrence Millar			Michele Beaton
3. Montague-Kilmuir	Cory Deagle	Norma Dingwell	Nick Sheppard	Robert Lethbridge	Gary Robbins	Angela Barton	Cory Deagle
7. Morell-Donagh	Sidney MacEwen	John Allen MacLean	Terry MacDonald	Kevin Trainor	Christopher Landry		Sidney MacEwen
1. Souris-Elmira	Robin Croucher	Boyd Leard	Amber Dennis	Gordon Gay	**Ahava Kalnassy de Kalnas**		Colin LaVie†
8. Stanhope-Marshfield	Bloyce Thompson			Marian White			Bloyce Thompson
6. Stratford-Keppoch	Jill Burridge	Lana Beth Barkhouse	Greg Arsenault	Olalekam Faromika			James Aylward†

=== Malpeque ===
Electoral district	Candidates					Incumbent
Electoral district	PC	Green	Liberal	NDP	Island	Incumbent
19. Borden-Kinkora	Jamie Fox	Matt MacFarlane		Carole MacFarlane	Paul Smitz	Jamie Fox
15. Brackley-Hunter River	**Dennis King**	Greg Bradley	Nicole Ford	Leah-Jane Hayward		**Dennis King**
16. Cornwall-Meadowbank	Mark McLane	Tayte Willows	Don Leary	Larry Hale		Mark McLane
20. Kensington-Malpeque	Matthew MacKay	Hunter Guindon	Richard Schroeter	Maggie Larocque		Matthew MacKay
17. New Haven-Rocky Point	Donalda Docherty	**Peter Bevan-Baker**	**Sharon Cameron**	Douglas Dahn	Neil Emery	**Peter Bevan-Baker**
18. Rustico-Emerald	Brad Trivers	Ranald MacFarlane	Flory Sanderson	David Wilson		Brad Trivers

=== Charlottetown ===
Electoral district	Candidates						Incumbent
Electoral district	PC	Green	Liberal	NDP	Island	Independent	Incumbent
11. Charlottetown-Belvedere	Susie Dillon	Joanna Morrison	Marcia Carroll	Aidin Mousavian	Jayne McAskill		Hannah Bell†
13. Charlottetown-Brighton	Rob Lantz	Janice Harper	Sandra Sunil	**Michelle Neill**			Ole Hammarlund† (Lost re-nomination)
9. Charlottetown-Hillsborough Park	Natalie Jameson	Adina Nault	Dellon Paul	Tristan Mitchell	Cari Barbour		Natalie Jameson
12. Charlottetown-Victoria Park	Tim Keizer	Karla Bernard	Barb MacLeod	Joe Byrne	Danni Moher		Karla Bernard
14. Charlottetown-West Royalty	Kristi MacKay	Nick LeClair	Gord McNeilly	Simone Webster	Bill Cann	Jessica Simmonds	Gord McNeilly
10. Charlottetown-Winsloe	Zack Bell	Charles Sanderson	Judy Hughes	Campbell Webster		Georgina Bassett	Zack Bell

=== Egmont ===
Electoral district	Candidates						Incumbent
Electoral district	PC	Green	Liberal	NDP	Island	Independent	Incumbent
26. Alberton-Bloomfield	Ernie Hudson	Ron McConnell	Pat Murphy	Kester Nurse			Ernie Hudson
24. Evangeline-Miscouche	Gilles Arsenault	Jason Charette	Pat MacLellan	Charles Turriff			Sonny Gallant†
25. O'Leary-Inverness	Daniel MacDonald	Richard Lush	Robert Henderson	Herb Dickieson			Robert Henderson
22. Summerside-South Drive	Barb Ramsay	Steve Howard	Nancy Beth Guptill	Kathryn Yule			Steve Howard
21. Summerside-Wilmot	Tyler DesRoches	Lynne Lund	Don Reid	Cassie MacKay	Eriena O'Reilly		Lynne Lund
27. Tignish-Palmer Road	April Delaney		Hal Perry	Gail Kinch			Hal Perry
23. Tyne Valley-Sherbrooke	Hilton MacLennan	Trish Altass	Wayne Cobb	Carol Rybinski		Wayne Biggar	Trish Altass

== Opinion polls ==

The following is a list of scientific opinion polls of published voter intentions.

Polling firm	Date(s) conducted	Link	PC	Green	Liberal	NDP	Sample size	Lead
General election results	3 April 2023		55.9	21.6	17.2	4.5	74,791	34.3
Forum Research	31 March 2023		47	28	20	4	424	19
Mainstreet Research	27 – 28 March 2023		50.4	21.9	22.3	5.4	962	28.1
Mainstreet Research	6 – 7 March 2023		58.9	14.3	23.2	3.6	515	35.7
	6 March 2023	Dissolution of the 66th PEI General Assembly, campaign begins						
Narrative Research	13 February – 2 March 2023		49	22	19	9	420	27
Narrative Research	2 – 23 November 2022		49	25	20	4	400	24
	19 November 2022	Sharon Cameron is elected leader of the Liberal party						
Narrative Research	9 – 16 August 2022		55	22	18	4	300	33
Narrative Research	4 – 24 May 2022		50	21	20	8	300	29
Narrative Research	9 – 22 February 2022		66	15	14	4	300	51
Narrative Research	3 – 28 November 2021		51	19	21	8	600	30
Narrative Research	9 – 25 August 2021		48	28	17	7	600	20
Narrative Research	18 – 28 May 2021		53	23	19	4	600	30
Narrative Research	2 – 16 February 2021	(Note: "Support and satisfaction remain high for PEI's King government" (PDF). Narrative Research. 9 March 2021.)	54	21	17	4	300	33
Narrative Research	11 – 29 November 2020		61	18	19	2	300	42
Narrative Research	4 – 19 August 2020		48	25	23	4	301	23
Narrative Research	29 April – 17 May 2020		57	22	22	1	216	32
MQO Research	3 – 10 March 2020		41	29	24	6	283	12
Narrative Research	3 – 19 February 2020	(Note: "Islanders express continued and climbing levels of satisfaction with PEI government" (PDF). Narrative Research. 12 March 2020.)	45	28	21	6	207	17
Narrative Research	1 – 22 November 2019		38	29	26	6	600	9
Narrative Research	1 – 22 August 2019	(Note: "Satisfaction with performance of PEI government at 11-year high" (PDF). Narrative Research. 17 September 2019.)	45	37	16	1	300	9
MQO Research	31 July – 6 August 2019		40	32	23	2	400	8
Narrative Research	6 – 23 May 2019		43	36	17	3	300	7
General election results	23 April 2019		36.7	30.6	29.4	3.0	80,329	5.9
Polling firm	Date(s) conducted	Link					Sample size	Lead
Polling firm	Date(s) conducted	Link	PC	Green	Liberal	NDP	Sample size	Lead
