= 2024 Borden-Kinkora provincial by-election =

← 2023	February 7, 2024	Next →

District of Borden-Kinkora
- Turnout: 58.9%
	First party	Second party
Candidate	Matt MacFarlane	Carmen Reeves
Party	Green	Progressive Conservative
Popular vote	1,226	964
Percentage	49.0%	38.5%
Swing	▲14.2	▼21.6
	Third party	Fourth party
Candidate	Gordon Sobey	Karen Morton
Party	Liberal	New Democratic
Popular vote	272	40
Percentage	10.9%	1.6%
Swing		▼1.3
MLA before election
Jamie Fox
Progressive Conservative
Elected MLA
Matt MacFarlane
Green

The 2024 Borden-Kinkora (District 19) provincial by-election was originally scheduled for February 5, 2024. However, because of impending weather conditions, Elections PEI announced the election would be postponed until Tuesday, February 6, 2024, with the same voting locations in place. It was then postponed again to February 7. It was triggered by the resignation of Progressive Conservative Jamie Fox from the Legislative Assembly of Prince Edward Island.

It was won by Green candidate Matt MacFarlane.

== Candidates ==
Four candidates were nominated for the election:

- Matt MacFarlane (Green) - President of the Green Party and Augustine Cove resident. He is a lawyer.
- Karen Morton (NDP) - Consultant and North Carleton resident.
- Carmen Reeves (Progressive Conservative) - former Canada Revenue Agency employee. Defeated Brian Nash, Jordan Johnston and Renee Pastoor for the nomination.
- Gordon Sobey (Liberal) - Former P.E.I. Federation of Agriculture president, pig and potato farmer. Currently an engineer. Was defeated by Wayne Easter in the Liberal Party of Canada nomination in Malpeque for the 1993 Canadian federal election. Searletown resident.

== Results ==
Prince Edward Island provincial by-election, February 7, 2024 Resignation of Jamie Fox
Party	Candidate	Votes	%	±%
Green	Matt MacFarlane	1,226	49.00	+14.19
Progressive Conservative	Carmen Reeves	964	38.53	–21.62
Liberal	Gordon Sobey	272	10.87	New
New Democratic	Karen Morton	40	1.60	–1.31
Total valid votes		2,502	99.80	
Total rejected ballots		5	0.20	–0.46
Turnout		2,507	58.91	–9.06
Eligible voters		4,256		
Green gain from Progressive Conservative		Swing		+17.90

== 2023 result ==
2023 Prince Edward Island general election: Borden-Kinkora
Party	Candidate	Votes	%	±%
Progressive Conservative	Jamie Fox	1,719	60.15	+8.04
Green	Matt MacFarlane	995	34.81	+2.53
New Democratic	Carole MacFarlane	83	2.90	+1.91
Island	Paul Smitz	61	2.13	
Total valid votes		2,858	99.34	
Total rejected ballots		19	0.66	+0.57
Turnout		2,877	67.97	–12.37
Eligible voters		4,233		
Progressive Conservative hold		Swing		+2.76

== See also ==
- List of Prince Edward Island by-elections
