= List of political parties in Prince Edward Island =

Since 1900, a total of eight registered provincial parties have existed in Prince Edward Island.

== Parties represented in the Legislative Assembly ==
Name	Founded	Ideology	Membership	Leader	MLAs
Progressive Conservative Party	1851	Conservatism	6,132 (2026)	Rob Lantz	18 / 27
Liberal Party	1873	Liberalism	3,192 (2025)	Dan Kutcher	4 / 27
Green Party	2005	Green politics	800 (2025)	Matt MacFarlane	4 / 27

== Other registered parties ==
Name	Founded	Ideology	Membership	Leader	MLAs
New Democratic Party of Prince Edward Island	1961	Social democracy	140 (2017)	Thomas Burleigh	0
Island Party	2010 (original), 2022 (relaunch)	Direct democracy Green conservatism		Mike McCormick (interim)	0

== Historical parties ==
- Draft Beer Party (1979)
- Garden Party
- Progressive Party of Prince Edward Island (1923)
