= Sharon Labchuk =

Leader of the Green Party of Prince Edward Island
- In office 2005–2012
- Preceded by: Office created
- Succeeded by: Darcie Lanthier (interim)

Personal details
- Born: November 25, 1952 (age 73) Trenton, Ontario
- Party: Green
- Occupation: political organizer, environmental activist, politician

Sharon Labchuk (born November 25, 1952 in Trenton, Ontario) is an environmental activist and political organizer for the Green Party of Canada (GPC). She was also the first leader of the Green Party of Prince Edward Island.

== Career ==
Labchuk founded the Green Party of Prince Edward Island in 2004. Labchuk is national director of organizing for the GPC. She resigned the leadership of the Green Party of PEI on July 12, 2012.

== Election results ==
In the 2006 federal election Labchuk was the GPC candidate in Malpeque, placing 4th with 901 votes or 4.65%.

She was defeated in the district of Rustico-Emerald during the 2007 Prince Edward Island general election running for the Green Party. Labchuk took 6% of the vote, finishing in third place.

In 2011, Labchuk stood against the provincial Minister of Environment, Energy and Forestry, in the Charlottetown-Victoria Park riding.

=== 2011 general election ===
2011 Prince Edward Island general election
Party	Candidate	Votes	%	±%
Liberal	Richard Brown	1105	51.13%	-2.19%
Progressive Conservative	Miles MacKinnon	582	26.93%	-6.48%
Green	Sharon Labchuk	278	12.86%	+7.07%
New Democratic	Rita Jackson	177	8.19%	+0.97%
Island	Phillip Stewart	19	0.88%	

=== 2007 general election ===
2007 Prince Edward Island general election
Party	Candidate	Votes	%	±%
Liberal	Carolyn Bertram	1,970	60.28%	
Progressive Conservative	David Blacquiere	1,101	33.69%	
Green	Sharon Labchuk	197	6.03%	

=== Federal ===
2006 Canadian federal election: Malpeque
Party	Candidate	Votes	%	±%	Expenditures
Liberal	Wayne Easter	9,779	50.48	-1.42	$51,121.23
Conservative	George Noble	6,708	34.63	+2.13	$52,989.45
New Democratic	George Marshall	1,983	10.24	+0.15	$3,388.31
Green	Sharon Labchuk	901	4.65	-0.85	$2,925.11
Total valid votes/expense limit		19,371	100.0		$62,210
Total rejected, unmarked and declined ballots		114	0.59	-0.17	
Turnout		19,485	75.10	+2.09	
Eligible voters		25,945			
Liberal hold		Swing		-1.78	

2004 Canadian federal election: Malpeque
Party	Candidate	Votes	%	±%	Expenditures
Liberal	Wayne Easter	9,782	51.90	+3.28	$49,256.92
Conservative	Mary Crane	6,126	32.50	-13.28	$52,127.38
New Democratic	Ken Bingham	1,902	10.09	+5.86	$3,055.96
Green	Sharon Labchuk	1,037	5.50	+4.15	$2,989.44
Total valid votes/expense limit		18,847	100.0		$60,645
Total rejected, unmarked and declined ballots		144	0.76		
Turnout		18,991	73.01		
Eligible voters		26,010			
Liberal hold		Swing		+8.28	
Change for the Conservatives is from the combined totals of the Progressive Conservatives and the Canadian Alliance.

== Personal life ==
Labchuk lives in Millvale, Queens County, in a solar-powered house. She grows her own fruit and vegetables.

== See also ==
- List of Green party leaders in Canada
