= Stratford-Keppoch =

Provincial electoral district in Prince Edward Island, Canada

Prince Edward Island electoral district

Provincial electoral district
- Legislature: Legislative Assembly of Prince Edward Island
MLA
Jill Burridge
Progressive Conservative
- District created: 2019
- First contested: 2019
- Last contested: 2023

Stratford-Keppoch (District 6) is a provincial electoral district for the Legislative Assembly of Prince Edward Island, Canada. The district was contested for the first time in the 2019 Prince Edward Island general election, and was created from a portion of the former district of Stratford-Kinlock.

== Members ==
The riding has elected the following members of the Legislative Assembly:

Members of the Legislative Assembly for Stratford-Keppoch
Assembly	Years	Member	Party
66th	2019–2023	James Aylward	Progressive Conservative
67th	2023–present	Jill Burridge	Progressive Conservative

== Election results ==
=== Stratford-Keppoch, 2019–present ===
2023 Prince Edward Island general election
Party	Candidate	Votes	%	±%
Progressive Conservative	Jill Burridge	1,479	52.3	+9.8
Green	Lana Beth Barkhouse	847	29.9	+3.0
Liberal	Greg Arsenault	471	16.6	-12.9
New Democratic	Olalekan Faromika	32	1.1	+0.1
Total valid votes		2,829	100.0	
Progressive Conservative hold		Swing		+4.7

2019 Prince Edward Island general election
Party	Candidate	Votes	%	±%	Expenditures
Progressive Conservative	James Aylward	1,270	42.5	-7.8	$5,903.30
Liberal	David Dunphy	882	29.5	-4.4	8,888.76
Green	Devon Strang	805	26.9	+21.0	3,436.51
New Democratic	Lynne Thiele	31	1.0	-8.1	none listed
Total valid votes/expense limit		2,988	99.83		$10,111.92
Total rejected ballots		5	0.17		
Turnout		2,993	80.80		
Eligible voters		3,704			
Progressive Conservative hold		Swing		-7.8	
Source: Elections Prince Edward Island

== See also ==
- List of Prince Edward Island provincial electoral districts
- Canadian provincial electoral districts
