= Morell-Donagh =

Provincial electoral district in Prince Edward Island, Canada

Prince Edward Island electoral district

Provincial electoral district
- Legislature: Legislative Assembly of Prince Edward Island
MLA
Sidney MacEwen
Progressive Conservative
- District created: 2019
- First contested: 2019
- Last contested: 2023

Morell-Donagh (District 7) is a provincial electoral district for the Legislative Assembly of Prince Edward Island, Canada. The district was contested for the first time in the 2019 Prince Edward Island general election.

== Members ==
The riding has elected the following members of the Legislative Assembly:

Members of the Legislative Assembly for Morell-Donagh
Assembly	Years	Member	Party
66th	2019–2023	Sidney MacEwen	Progressive Conservative
67th	2023–present	Sidney MacEwen	Progressive Conservative

== Election results ==
=== Morell-Donagh, 2019–present ===
2023 Prince Edward Island general election
Party	Candidate	Votes	%	±%
Progressive Conservative	Sidney MacEwen	1,899	70.4	+12.8
Green	John Allen MacLean	349	12.9	-10.0
Liberal	Terry MacDonald	282	10.5	-7.9
New Democratic	Kevin Trainor	115	4.3	+3.1
Island	Christopher Landry	44	1.6	+1.6
Total valid votes		2,698	100.0	
Progressive Conservative hold		Swing		+11.4

2019 Prince Edward Island general election
Party	Candidate	Votes	%	±%
Progressive Conservative	Sidney MacEwen	1,752	57.6%	+7.7
Green	Kyle MacDonald	697	22.9%	+17.6
Liberal	Susan Myers	557	18.3%	-19.3
New Democratic	Margaret Andrade	35	1.2%	-6.1
Total valid votes		3,041	100.00	
This is a newly created district

2015 Prince Edward Island general election redistributed results
Party	Votes	%
Progressive Conservative	1,535	49.9
Liberal	1,157	37.6
New Democratic	224	7.3
Green	163	5.3
Source(s) Source: Ridingbuilder

== See also ==
- List of Prince Edward Island provincial electoral districts
- Canadian provincial electoral districts
