= Charlottetown-West Royalty =

Provincial electoral district in Prince Edward Island, Canada

Prince Edward Island electoral district
- Coordinates: 46.262°N 63.169°W

Provincial electoral district
- Legislature: Legislative Assembly of Prince Edward Island
MLA
Gord McNeilly
Liberal
- District created: 2019
- First contested: 2019
- Last contested: 2023

Demographics
- Census division: Queens County
- Census subdivision: Charlottetown

Charlottetown-West Royalty (District 14) is a provincial electoral district for the Legislative Assembly of Prince Edward Island, Canada. It was created prior to the 2019 election from parts of the former districts Charlottetown-Lewis Point and West Royalty-Springvale.

The riding is located in the city of Charlottetown, including the neighbourhoods of Lewis Point and West Royalty.

== Election results ==
=== Charlottetown-West Royalty, 2019–present ===
2023 Prince Edward Island general election
Party	Candidate	Votes	%	±%
Liberal	Gord McNeilly	1,207	45.1	+9.9
Progressive Conservative	Kristi Mackay	1,042	38.9	+14.0
Green	Nick Leclair	301	11.2	-20.2
New Democratic	Simone Webster	63	2.4	+0.5
Independent	Jessica Simmonds	36	1.3	
Island	Bill Cann	28	1.0	
Total valid votes		2,677	100.0	
Liberal hold		Swing		+1.2

2019 Prince Edward Island general election
Party	Candidate	Votes	%	±%
Liberal	Gord McNeilly	1,079	35.2	+0.6
Green	Gavin Hall	966	31.5	+22.6
Progressive Conservative	Angus Birt	766	25.0	-4.1
Independent	Bush Dumville	202	6.6	
New Democratic	Janis Newman	56	1.8	-25.6
Total valid votes		3,069	100.0	
This is a newly created district

2015 Prince Edward Island general election redistributed results
Party	Votes	%
Liberal	1,092	34.6
Progressive Conservative	919	29.1
New Democratic	863	27.4
Green	281	8.9
Source(s) Source: Ridingbuilder

== Referendum and plebiscite results ==
=== 2019 electoral reform referendum ===
The 2019 Prince Edward Island electoral reform referendum was held on April 23, 2019.

== See also ==
- List of Prince Edward Island provincial electoral districts
- Canadian provincial electoral districts
