= Matt MacFarlane =

Canadian politician from Prince Edward Island

Leader of the Green Party of Prince Edward Island
- Incumbent
- Assumed office June 7, 2025
- Preceded by: Karla Bernard (interim)

Member of the Legislative Assembly of Prince Edward Island for Borden-Kinkora
- Incumbent
- Assumed office February 7, 2024
- Preceded by: Jamie Fox

Personal details
- Party: Green Party of Prince Edward Island
- Occupation: Lawyer

Matt MacFarlane is a Canadian politician who has served as the leader of the Green Party of Prince Edward Island since June 2025. He has been a member of the Legislative Assembly of Prince Edward Island since winning the 2024 Borden-Kinkora provincial by-election. MacFarlane was previously an unsuccessful Green candidate in Borden-Kinkora in the 2019 and 2023 general elections. He is the former president of the Green Party of Prince Edward Island and a lawyer by profession.

== Electoral record ==
Prince Edward Island provincial by-election, February 7, 2024 Resignation of Jamie Fox
Party	Candidate	Votes	%	±%
Green	Matt MacFarlane	1,226	49.00	+14.19
Progressive Conservative	Carmen Reeves	964	38.53	-21.62
Liberal	Gordon Sobey	272	10.87	
New Democratic	Karen Morton	40	1.60	-1.31
Total valid votes		2,502	99.80	
Total rejected ballots		5	0.20	-0.46
Turnout		2,507	58.91	-9.06
Eligible voters		4,256		
Green gain from Progressive Conservative		Swing		+17.90

2023 Prince Edward Island general election: Borden-Kinkora
Party	Candidate	Votes	%	±%
Progressive Conservative	Jamie Fox	1,719	60.15	+8.04
Green	Matt MacFarlane	995	34.81	+2.53
New Democratic	Carole MacFarlane	83	2.90	+1.91
Island	Paul Smitz	61	2.13	
Total valid votes		2,858	99.34	
Total rejected ballots		19	0.66	+0.57
Turnout		2,877	67.97	–12.37
Eligible voters		4,233		
Progressive Conservative hold		Swing		+2.76

2019 Prince Edward Island general election
Party	Candidate	Votes	%	±%
Progressive Conservative	Jamie Fox	1,680	52.11	+4.97
Green	Matt MacFarlane	1,041	32.29	+17.21
Liberal	Jamie Stride	417	12.93	-21.13
Independent	Fred McCardle	54	1.67	N.A.
New Democratic	Joan Gauvin	32	0.99	-2.73
Total valid votes		3,224	99.91	
Total rejected ballots		3	0.09	-0.20
Turnout		3,227	80.33	-2.32
Eligible voters		4,017		
Progressive Conservative hold		Swing		-6.12

== See also ==
- 67th General Assembly of Prince Edward Island
