= Michele Beaton =

Canadian politician

Member of the Legislative Assembly of Prince Edward Island for Mermaid-Stratford
- In office April 23, 2019 – March 6, 2023
- Preceded by: Riding established
- Succeeded by: Jenn Redmond

Personal details
- Party: Green

Michele Beaton is a Canadian politician, who was elected to the Legislative Assembly of Prince Edward Island in the 2019 Prince Edward Island general election. She represented the district of Mermaid-Stratford as a member of the Green Party of Prince Edward Island.

== Personal life ==
Her father, Glen Beaton ran in Cardigan at the 2019 federal election.

== Electoral record ==
2023 Prince Edward Island general election: Mermaid-Stratford
Party	Candidate	Votes	%	±%
Progressive Conservative	Jenn Redmond	1,245	45.3	+14.4
Green	Michele Beaton	1,207	43.9	+5.8
Liberal	Gail MacDonald	254	9.2	-20.6
New Democratic	Lawrence Millar	43	1.6	+0.3
Total valid votes		2,749	100.0	
Progressive Conservative gain from Green		Swing		+4.3

2019 Prince Edward Island general election: Mermaid-Stratford
Party	Candidate	Votes	%	±%
Green	Michele Beaton	1,152	38.1	+29.9
Progressive Conservative	Mary Ellen McInnis	934	30.9	-10.4
Liberal	Randy Cooper	902	29.8	-11.5
New Democratic	Lawrence Millar	38	1.3	-7.8
Total valid votes		3,026	100.0	
Green gain from Liberal		Swing		+29.9
Source: Elections Prince Edward Island
