= Alberton-Bloomfield =

Provincial electoral district in Prince Edward Island, Canada

Prince Edward Island electoral district

Provincial electoral district
- Legislature: Legislative Assembly of Prince Edward Island
MLA
Ernie Hudson
Progressive Conservative
- District created: 2019
- First contested: 2019
- Last contested: 2023

Alberton-Bloomfield (District 26) is a provincial electoral district for the Legislative Assembly of Prince Edward Island, Canada. The district was contested for the first time in the 2019 Prince Edward Island general election. It was created largely from the previous riding Alberton-Roseville, with relatively small adjustments to the former's boundaries.

== Members ==
The riding has elected the following members of the Legislative Assembly:

Members of the Legislative Assembly for Alberton-Bloomfield
Assembly	Years	Member	Party
66th	2019–2023	Ernie Hudson	Progressive Conservative
67th	2023–present	Ernie Hudson	Progressive Conservative

== Election results ==
2023 Prince Edward Island general election
Party	Candidate	Votes	%	±%
Progressive Conservative	Ernie Hudson	1,532	57.6	+12.0
Liberal	Pat Murphy	896	33.7	-6.4
Green	Ron McConnell	132	5.0	-6.0
New Democratic	Kester Nurse	102	3.8	+0.4
Total valid votes		2,662	100.0	
Progressive Conservative hold		Swing		+9.2

2019 Prince Edward Island general election
Party	Candidate	Votes	%	±%
Progressive Conservative	Ernie Hudson	1,312	45.54	+4.2
Liberal	Pat Murphy	1,153	40.02	-12.1
Green	James McKenna	317	11.00	+10.9
New Democratic	Michelle Arsenault	99	3.44	-3.1
Total valid votes		2,881	93.84	
This riding was newly created.

2015 Prince Edward Island general election redistributed results
Party	Votes	%
Liberal	1,409	52.1
Progressive Conservative	1,117	41.3
New Democratic	177	6.5
Green	2	0.07
Source(s) Source: Ridingbuilder

== See also ==
- List of Prince Edward Island provincial electoral districts
- Canadian provincial electoral districts
