= List of Green party leaders in Canada =

This is a list of the current Green Party leaders and deputy leaders in Canada.

| Party | Leader | Leader since | Deputy leader(s) |
|---|---|---|---|
| Green Party of Canada | Mike Morrice | November 14, 2026 | Angela Davidson |
| Green Party of Alberta | James Anderson | November 22, 2025 (Note: Interim leader from 2025 to 2026.) | Ian Hopfe |
| Green Party of British Columbia | Emily Lowan | September 24, 2025 | Vacant |
| Green Party of Manitoba | Janine Gibson | March 26, 2023 | Dennis Bayomi & Blair Mahaffy |
| Green Party of New Brunswick | David Coon | September 21, 2012 | Megan Mitton & Kevin Arseneau |
| Green Party of Nova Scotia | Anthony Edmonds | October 23, 2021 | Vacant |
| Green Party of Ontario | Mike Schreiner | November 15, 2009 | Aislinn Clancy & Matt Richter |
| Green Party of Prince Edward Island | Matt MacFarlane | June 7, 2025 | Karla Bernard |
| Green Party of Quebec | Alex Tyrrell | September 21, 2013 | Halimatou Bah |
| Green Party of Saskatchewan | Naomi Hunter | February 29, 2020 | Victor Lau |
