= Mermaid-Stratford =

Provincial electoral district in Prince Edward Island, Canada

Prince Edward Island electoral district
- Coordinates: 46.226°N 62.922°W

Provincial electoral district
- Legislature: Legislative Assembly of Prince Edward Island
MLA
Jenn Redmond
Progressive Conservative
- District created: 2019
- First contested: 2019
- Last contested: 2023

Mermaid-Stratford (District 5) is a provincial electoral district for the Legislative Assembly of Prince Edward Island, Canada. It was contested for the first time in the 2019 Prince Edward Island general election, and was previously part of the district of Vernon River-Stratford.

== Members ==
Members of the Legislative Assembly for Vernon River-Stratford
Assembly	Years	Member	Party
66th	2019–2023	Michele Beaton	Green
67th	2023–present	Jenn Redmond	Progressive Conservative

== Election results ==
2023 Prince Edward Island general election
Party	Candidate	Votes	%	±%
Progressive Conservative	Jenn Redmond	1,245	45.3	+14.4
Green	Michele Beaton	1,207	43.9	+5.8
Liberal	Gail MacDonald	254	9.2	-20.6
New Democratic	Lawrence Millar	43	1.6	+0.3
Total valid votes		2,749	100.0	
Progressive Conservative gain from Green		Swing		+4.3

2019 Prince Edward Island general election
Party	Candidate	Votes	%	±%
Green	Michele Beaton	1,152	38.1	+29.9
Progressive Conservative	Mary Ellen McInnis	934	30.9	-10.4
Liberal	Randy Cooper	902	29.8	-11.5
New Democratic	Lawrence Millar	38	1.3	-7.8
Total valid votes		3,026	100.0	
Green gain from Liberal		Swing		+29.9
Source: Elections Prince Edward Island

== See also ==
- List of Prince Edward Island provincial electoral districts
- Canadian provincial electoral districts
