= Charlottetown-Victoria Park =

Provincial electoral district in Prince Edward Island, Canada

Prince Edward Island electoral district
- Coordinates: 46.235°N 63.128°W

Provincial electoral district
- Legislature: Legislative Assembly of Prince Edward Island
MLA
Karla Bernard
Green
- District created: 1996
- First contested: 1996
- Last contested: 2023

Demographics
- Census division: Queens County
- Census subdivision: Charlottetown

Charlottetown-Victoria Park (District 12) is a provincial electoral district for the Legislative Assembly of Prince Edward Island, Canada. It consists of the entire downtown core of Charlottetown. It was previously known as Charlottetown-Kings Square.

== Members ==
The riding has elected the following members of the Legislative Assembly:

Members of the Legislative Assembly for Charlottetown-Victoria Park
Assembly	Years	Member	Party
See 5th Queens 1873–1996 and 6th Queens 1966–1996
60th	1996–1997	Wayne Cheverie	Liberal
60th	1997–2000	Richard Brown	Liberal
61st	2000–2003	Bob MacMillan	Progressive Conservative
62nd	2003–2007	Richard Brown	Liberal
63rd	2007–2011	Richard Brown	Liberal
64th	2011–2015	Richard Brown	Liberal
65th	2015–2019	Richard Brown	Liberal
66th	2019–2023	Karla Bernard	Green
67th	2023–present	Karla Bernard	Green

== Election results ==
=== Charlottetown-Victoria Park, 2007–present ===
2023 Prince Edward Island general election
Party	Candidate	Votes	%	±%
Green	Karla Bernard	1,052	42.0	+1.5
Progressive Conservative	Tim Keizer	978	39.0	+18.2
Liberal	Barb MacLeod	293	11.7	-16.2
New Democratic	Joe Byrne	150	6.0	-4.8
Island	Danni Moher	32	1.3	
Total valid votes		2,505	100.0	
Green hold		Swing		-4.8

2019 Prince Edward Island general election
Party	Candidate	Votes	%	±%	Expenditures
Green	Karla Bernard	1,272	40.5	+21.7	$5,713.87
Liberal	Richard Brown	875	27.9	-11.5	$8,745.20
Progressive Conservative	Tim Keizer	656	20.9	-6.6	$8,352.69
New Democratic	Joe Byrne	338	10.8	-3.6	$20,244.92
Total valid votes/expense limit		3,141	99.5		$11,564.28
Rejected ballots		17	0.5		
Turnout		3,158	74.55	−6.1	
Eligible voters		4,236			
Green gain from Liberal		Swing		+14.4	
Source: Elections PEI

2015 Prince Edward Island general election
Party	Candidate	Votes	%	±%
Liberal	Richard Brown	955	39.38	-11.75
Progressive Conservative	Joey Kitson	666	27.46	+0.53
Green	Darcie Lanthier	456	18.80	+5.94
New Democratic	Chris Clay	348	14.35	+6.16
Total valid votes		2,425	100.0	
Liberal hold		Swing		-6.14

2011 Prince Edward Island general election
Party	Candidate	Votes	%	±%
Liberal	Richard Brown	1,105	51.13	-2.45
Progressive Conservative	Miles MacKinnon	582	26.93	-6.48
Green	Sharon Labchuk	278	12.86	+7.07
New Democratic	Rita Jackson	177	8.19	+0.97
Island	Phillip Stewart	19	0.88	
Total valid votes		2,161	100.0	
Liberal hold		Swing		+2.02

2007 Prince Edward Island general election
Party	Candidate	Votes	%	±%
Liberal	Richard Brown	1,536	53.58	+2.57
Progressive Conservative	Jason Lee	958	33.41	-12.50
New Democratic	Dean Constable	207	7.22	+4.13
Green	Denise Reiser	166	5.79	
Total valid votes		2,867	100.0	
Liberal hold		Swing		+7.54

==== 2016 electoral reform plebiscite results ====
2016 Prince Edward Island electoral reform referendum
Side	Votes	%
Mixed Member Proportional	411	33.86
Dual Member Proportional Representation	338	27.84
First Past the Post	251	20.68
Preferential Voting	122	10.05
First Past the Post plus leaders	92	7.58
Two-choice preferred result
Mixed Member Proportional	559	55.79
Dual Member Proportional Representation	443	44.21
Total votes cast	1,214	40.83
Registered voters	2,973	
Source "Plebiscite Report" (PDF).

=== Charlottetown-Kings Square, 1996–2007 ===
2003 Prince Edward Island general election
Party	Candidate	Votes	%	±%
Liberal	Richard Brown	1,420	51.01	+6.66
Progressive Conservative	Bobby MacMillan	1,278	45.91	+0.97
New Democratic	Kevin Roach	86	3.09	-7.62
Total valid votes		2,784	100.0	
Liberal gain from Progressive Conservative		Swing		+2.84

2000 Prince Edward Island general election
Party	Candidate	Votes	%	±%
Progressive Conservative	Bobby MacMillan	1,213	44.94	+8.51
Liberal	Richard Brown	1,197	44.35	+1.68
New Democratic	Lesley Sprague	289	10.71	-10.19
Total valid votes		2,699	100.0	
Progressive Conservative gain from Liberal		Swing		+3.42

Prince Edward Island provincial by-election, 17 November 1997 On the appointment of Wayne Cheverie to the Regulatory and Appeals Commission
Party	Candidate	Votes	%	±%
Liberal	Richard Brown	1,019	42.67	-5.66
Progressive Conservative	Brian McKenna	870	36.43	-2.20
New Democratic	Leo Broderick	499	20.90	+7.86
Total valid votes		2,388	100.0	
Liberal hold		Swing		-1.73

1996 Prince Edward Island general election
Party	Candidate	Votes	%
Liberal	Wayne D. Cheverie	1,345	48.33
Progressive Conservative	Brian McKenna	1,075	38.63
New Democratic	Sibyl Frei	363	13.04
Total valid votes		2,783	100.0
This riding was created from parts of the dual-member ridings of 5th Queens and 6th Queens.

== See also ==
- List of Prince Edward Island provincial electoral districts
- Canadian provincial electoral districts
