= Gord McNeilly =

Canadian politician

Gord McNeilly MLA

Member of the Legislative Assembly of Prince Edward Island for Charlottetown-West Royalty
- Incumbent
- Assumed office April 23, 2019
- Preceded by: Riding established

Personal details
- Party: Liberal

Gord McNeilly is a Canadian politician, who was elected to the Legislative Assembly of Prince Edward Island in the 2019 Prince Edward Island general election. He represents the district of Charlottetown-West Royalty as a member of the Liberal Party of Prince Edward Island.

== Political career ==
In the 2015 provincial election, he ran as the NDP candidate in the district of Charlottetown-Lewis Point, coming in a close second (30.67%) after the Liberal Kathleen Casey (34.26%).

He was re-elected in the 2023 general election.

As of September 8, 2024, he serves as the Opposition critic for Wellness, Social Development, Housing, Justice, Public Safety, and the Status of Women. He also serves as the Opposition House Leader.

He is the only black member of the legislature.

== Electoral record ==
2023 Prince Edward Island general election: Charlottetown-West Royalty
| Party | Candidate | Votes | % | ±% |
|---|---|---|---|---|
| Liberal | Gord McNeilly | 1,207 | 45.10 | +9.90 |
| Progressive Conservative | Kristi MacKay | 1,042 | 38.90 | +13.90 |
| Green | Nick LecLair | 301 | 11.20 | -20.30 |
| New Democratic | Simone Webster | 63 | 2.40 | +.60 |
| Independent | Jessica Simmonds | 36 | 1.30 | |
| Island Party | Bill Cann | 28 | 1 | |
| Total valid votes | | 2700 | | |
| Total rejected ballots | | 23 | 0.85 | |
| Turnout | | 2,723 | | |
| Liberal hold | | Swing | | +9.90 |
