= 2012 Green Party of Prince Edward Island leadership election =

- Date: 3 November 2012
- Convention: Charlottetown, Prince Edward Island, Canada
- Resigning leader: Sharon Labchuk
- Won by: Peter Bevan-Baker
- Candidates: 1 (+ none of the above)

The Green Party of Prince Edward Island leadership election took place on 2–3 November, Prince Edward Island, Canada.

On 12 July 2012, Sharon Labchuk resigned from the leadership of the Green Party of PEI, triggering a leadership election. An interim leader and the details of the leadership election are to be announced.

On 3 November 2012, Peter Bevan-Baker was elected leader.

== None of the above ==
The None of the above ballot option was available to members.

== Timeline ==
- 12 July 2012 – Sharon Labchuk resigned from the leadership after leading the party for 7 years, and was the founding leader.
- 17 July 2012 – Darcie Lanthier is appointed interim leader. She says the leadership convention will be held in the fall.
- 2 & 3 November 2012 – Leadership convention in Charlottetown.
- 3 November 2012 – Peter Bevan-Baker was elected leader.
- 21 July 2023 – Bevan-Baker resigns as party leader. Karla Bernard named interim leader.
- 7 June 2025 – Leadership convention to be held.

== Candidates ==
- Peter Bevan-Baker
