= Stanhope-Marshfield =

Provincial electoral district in Prince Edward Island, Canada

Prince Edward Island electoral district
- Coordinates: 46.361°N 63.120°W

Provincial electoral district
- Legislature: Legislative Assembly of Prince Edward Island
MLA
Bloyce Thompson
Progressive Conservative
- District created: 2019
- First contested: 2019
- Last contested: 2023

Demographics
- Census division: Queens County
- Census subdivision: Charlottetown

Stanhope-Marshfield (District 8) is a provincial electoral district for the Legislative Assembly of Prince Edward Island, Canada. It was created prior to the 2019 election from parts of the former districts Tracadie-Hillsborough Park and York-Oyster Bed.

The riding consists of rural communities north-east of Charlottetown, including Brackley Beach, Marshfield, and Stanhope.

== Election results ==
=== Stanhope-Marshfield, 2019–present ===
2023 Prince Edward Island general election
Party	Candidate	Votes	%	±%
Progressive Conservative	Bloyce Thompson	2,209	79.6	+40.1
New Democratic	Marian White	566	20.4	+19.0
Total valid votes		2,775	100.0	
Progressive Conservative hold		Swing		+28.0

2019 Prince Edward Island general election
Party	Candidate	Votes	%	±%
Progressive Conservative	Bloyce Thompson	1,300	39.53	+13.4
Liberal	Wade MacLauchlan	1,196	36.36	-19.2
Green	Sarah Donald	747	22.71	+14.4
New Democratic	Marian White	46	1.40	-8.6
Total valid votes		3,289	100.00	
Progressive Conservative notional gain from Liberal		Swing		+16.3

2015 Prince Edward Island general election redistributed results
Party	Votes	%
Liberal	1,655	55.6
Progressive Conservative	777	26.1
New Democratic	296	10.0
Green	246	8.3
Source(s) Source: Ridingbuilder

== Referendum and plebiscite results ==
=== 2019 electoral reform referendum ===
The 2019 Prince Edward Island electoral reform referendum was held on April 23, 2019.

== See also ==
- List of Prince Edward Island provincial electoral districts
- Canadian provincial electoral districts
