= Tyne Valley-Sherbrooke =

Provincial electoral district in Prince Edward Island, Canada

Prince Edward Island electoral district

Provincial electoral district
- Legislature: Legislative Assembly of Prince Edward Island
MLA
Hilton MacLennan
Progressive Conservative
- District created: 2019
- First contested: 2019
- Last contested: 2023

Tyne Valley-Sherbrooke (District 23) is a provincial electoral district for the Legislative Assembly of Prince Edward Island, Canada. The district was contested for the first time in the 2019 Prince Edward Island general election, and was created from a portion of the former district of Tyne Valley-Linkletter.

== Members ==
The riding has elected the following members of the Legislative Assembly:

Members of the Legislative Assembly for Tyne Valley-Sherbrooke
Assembly	Years	Member	Party
66th	2019–2023	Trish Altass	Green
67th	2023–present	Hilton MacLennan	Progressive Conservative

== Election results ==
=== Tyne Valley-Sherbrooke, 2019–present ===
2023 Prince Edward Island general election
Party	Candidate	Votes	%	±%
Progressive Conservative	Hilton MacLennan	1,326	51.2	+18.0
Green	Trish Altass	964	37.2	+1.6
Liberal	Wayne Cobb	212	8.2	-20.4
Independent	Wayne Biggar	49	1.9	
New Democratic	Carol Rybinski	37	1.4	-1.2
Total valid votes		2,588	100.0	
Progressive Conservative gain from Green		Swing		+8.2

2019 Prince Edward Island general election
Party	Candidate	Votes	%	±%
Green	Trish Altass	1,101	35.6%	+26.4
Progressive Conservative	Hilton MacLennan	1,026	33.2%	-2.0
Liberal	Paula Biggar	882	28.5%	-12.8
New Democratic	"Robin" John Robert Enman	82	2.7%	-11.7
Total valid votes			100.00	
This riding was newly created.

2015 Prince Edward Island general election redistributed results
Party	Votes	%
Liberal	1,211	41.3
Progressive Conservative	1,032	35.2
New Democratic	422	14.4
Green	270	9.2
Source(s) Source: Ridingbuilder

== See also ==
- List of Prince Edward Island provincial electoral districts
- Canadian provincial electoral districts
