= Summerside-South Drive =

Provincial electoral district in Prince Edward Island, Canada

Prince Edward Island electoral district
- Coordinates: 46.412°N 63.802°W

Provincial electoral district
- Legislature: Legislative Assembly of Prince Edward Island
MLA
Barb Ramsay
Progressive Conservative
- District created: 2019
- First contested: 2019
- Last contested: 2023

Demographics
- Census division: Prince County
- Census subdivision: Summerside

Summerside-South Drive (District 22) is a provincial electoral district for the Legislative Assembly of Prince Edward Island, Canada.

== Members ==
The riding has elected the following members of the Legislative Assembly:

Members of the Legislative Assembly for Summerside-St. Eleanors
Assembly	Years	Member	Party
66th	2019–2023	Steve Howard	Green
67th	2023–present	Barb Ramsay	Progressive Conservative

== Election results ==
2023 Prince Edward Island general election
Party	Candidate	Votes	%	±%
Progressive Conservative	Barb Ramsay	1,378	53.3	+31.0
Green	Steve Howard	739	28.6	-15.3
Liberal	Nancy Beth Guptill	397	15.4	-16.3
New Democratic	Kathryn Yule	70	2.7	+0.5
Total valid votes		2,584	100.0	
Progressive Conservative gain from Green		Swing		+23.1

2019 Prince Edward Island general election
Party	Candidate	Votes	%	±%
Green	Steve Howard	1,302	43.9	+32.2
Liberal	Tina Mundy	938	31.6	-9.0
Progressive Conservative	Paul Walsh	662	22.3	-12.4
New Democratic	Trevor Leclerc	65	2.2	-10.8
Total valid votes		2967	100.00	
This is a newly created district				

2015 Prince Edward Island general election redistributed results
Party	Votes	%
Liberal	1,183	40.6
Progressive Conservative	1,011	34.7
New Democratic	379	13.0
Green	342	11.7
Source(s) Source: Ridingbuilder

== See also ==
- List of Prince Edward Island provincial electoral districts
- Canadian provincial electoral districts
