= Dean Constable =

Leader of the New Democratic Party of Prince Edward Island
- In office 2006 – November 2007
- Preceded by: Gary Robichaud
- Succeeded by: James Rodd

Personal details
- Born: January 11, 1980 (age 46) Charlottetown, Prince Edward Island
- Party: New Democratic Party
- Profession: theatre manager

Dean Constable (born January 11, 1980, in Charlottetown, Prince Edward Island, Canada) was the leader of the New Democratic Party of Prince Edward Island (NDP) from 2006 to 2007. He replaced Gary Robichaud as leader. Constable used to be the theatre stage manager for the Charlottetown Festival. Constable was elected the leader of the Island New Democrats on April 23, 2006, by a narrow margin over labour leader Mike DesRoches.

He announced he would be running on an anti-privatisation and pro-universal health care and child care platform. Constable's leadership appeared to be welcomed by Islanders as early polls reported the NDP's support had risen from four to eight per cent. He contested the seat of Charlottetown-Victoria Park in the 2007 provincial election.

In June 2006, Constable criticized Premier Pat Binns' government for gerrymandering the new electoral riding map to divide the province in an east vs. west conflict. Constable said it would only draw attention away from "important" issues like health care and education. He expressed support for the map introduced by Justice John A. McQuaid in 2004.

Constable announced his resignation from the leadership of the party on August 26, 2007, citing personal reasons.
