= 2019 Prince Edward Island general election =

Canadian provincial election

- April 23, 2019 (July 15, 2019 (Note: Charlottetown-Hillsborough Park's district election was delayed for July 15))

27 seats in the Legislative Assembly of Prince Edward Island 14 seats needed for a majority
- Opinion polls
- Turnout: 76.28%▼
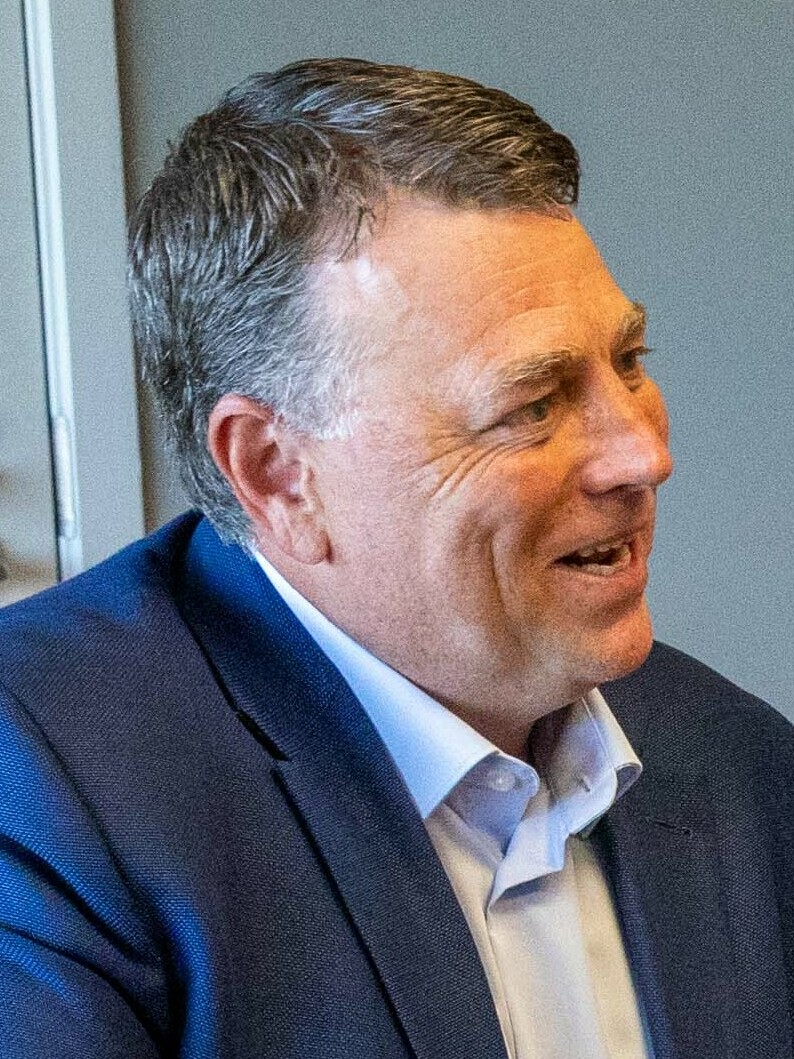

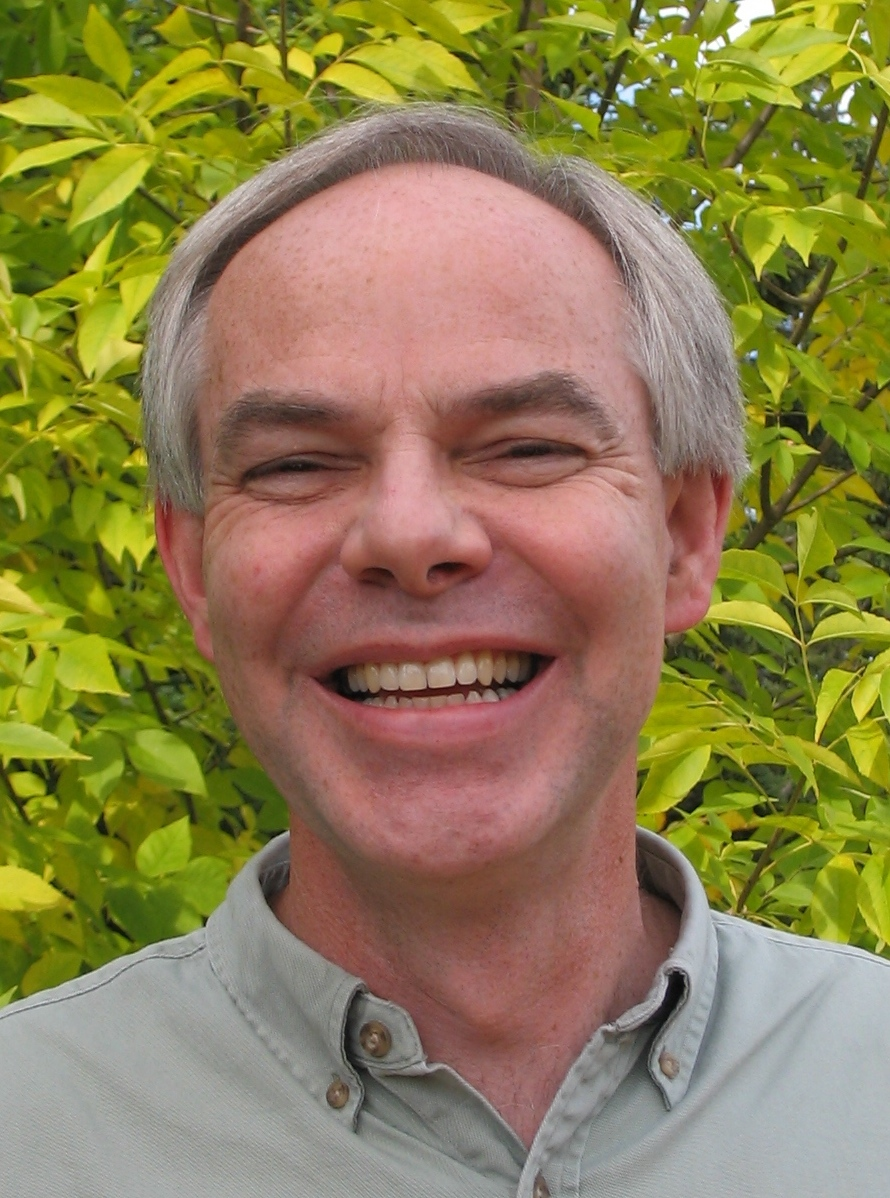

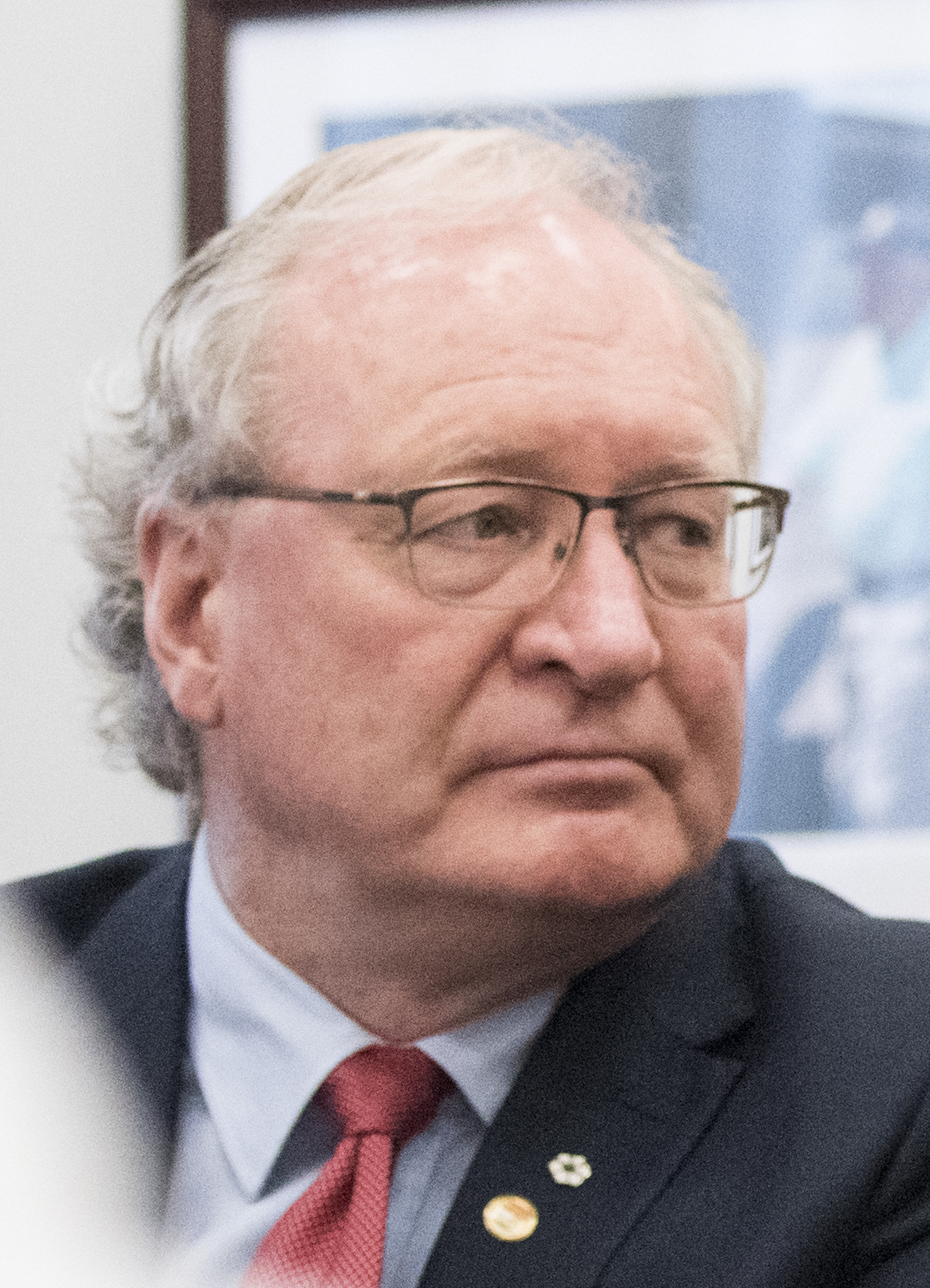
	First party	Second party	Third party
Leader	Dennis King	Peter Bevan-Baker	Wade MacLauchlan
Party	Progressive Conservative	Green	Liberal
Leader since	9 February 2019	3 November 2012	21 February 2015
Leader's seat	Brackley-Hunter River	New Haven-Rocky Point	Ran in Stanhope-Marshfield (lost)
Last election	8 seats, 37.39%	1 seat, 10.81%	18 seats, 40.83%
Seats before	8	2	16
Seats won	13	8	6
Seat change	▲5	▲6	▼10
Popular vote	30,415	25,302	24,346
Percentage	36.73%	30.56%	29.40%
Swing	▼0.66%	▲19.75%	▼11.43%
- Popular vote by district. As this is a FPTP election, seat totals are not determined by popular vote, but instead by the result in each district. District names are listed at the bottom. The results of the deferred Charlottetown-Hillsborough Park election are included in a separate inset.
Premier before election
Wade MacLauchlan
Liberal
Premier after election
Dennis King
Progressive Conservative

The 2019 Prince Edward Island general election was held to elect the members of the 66th General Assembly of Prince Edward Island. The vote in 26 of the 27 districts was held on 23 April 2019, while the vote for the member from Charlottetown-Hillsborough Park was deferred to 15 July due to the death of the Green Party's candidate. (Note: District 9 Charlottetown-Hillsborough Park's Green Party candidate Josh Underhay died on 19 April 2019.) However, Charlottetown-Hillsborough Park still voted in a referendum on electoral reform. Natalie Jameson won the deferred election in the district.

The Progressive Conservatives under new leader Dennis King won thirteen seats (including the deferred seat) to form a minority government. The Greens under leader Peter Bevan-Baker won eight seats to form the Official Opposition. The Liberals under Premier Wade MacLauchlan were reduced to six seats and MacLauchlan lost in his own district. The Progressive Conservatives' share of the popular vote was steady at 37%, the Green Party enjoyed a 20 point increase to 31%, and the Liberals' share dropped 11 points to 30%. The Greens won several seats in or near the two cities of Charlottetown and Summerside, while the Progressive Conservatives took several more rural seats from the Liberals. The result was considered a major political upset, as the Progressive Conservatives won a plurality of the popular vote and came within one seat of an outright majority in the legislative assembly despite having not lead in any opinion polls since the previous provincial election, and polling had generally indicated the race to be between the Greens and the Liberals; a few polls taken in the weeks prior to the election had seen the Progressive Conservatives move into second place ahead of the Liberals, but even then the polls had consistently predicted a Green victory.

A referendum on electoral reform that asked Islanders if they wished to adopt a mixed-member proportional representation voting system was held in conjunction with the election. The initiative failed to pass in at least 60% of the districts as required under provincial legislation to proceed so the province did not change from the first past the post system in subsequent elections. As well, the Island-wide popular vote showed about 51% of voters voted to stay with the current first-past-the-post voting system while about 49% voted for the proposed change.

The election was the first time since the 1890 Prince Edward Island general election that the province elected a minority government, the first time in the province's history that a significant number of voters turned to a third party besides the dominant Liberals and Progressive Conservatives, and the first time that a Green Party reached official opposition status in any Canadian provincial legislature.

== Background ==
Under the provisions of the Prince Edward Island Elections Act, an election was required by the fixed date of 7 October 2019, unless it was called earlier. After months of speculation of an early election call, Premier Wade MacLauchlan announced the election at a rally on 26 March.

In the previous election, on 4 May 2015, the Liberal Party, led by Premier Wade MacLauchlan, was re-elected to a majority government, earning election in 18 out of the 27 ridings (and down 2 from their pre-election total). The official opposition Progressive Conservatives, under leader Rob Lantz, increased its seat count from 3 before the election to 8, despite Lantz losing in Charlottetown-Brighton. Meanwhile, the Green Party, under leader Peter Bevan-Baker, won its first ever seat, Bevan-Baker's, in Kellys Cross-Cumberland. The NDP were unable to win a seat, continuing their streak of being shut out of the legislature since 2000.

Despite the increase in the Progressive Conservatives' seat count, on 23 September of that year, Lantz stepped down as leader. Since Lantz's departure, The Progressive Conservatives held two leadership elections: one on 20 October 2017, selecting MLA James Aylward as their leader; and again on 9 February 2019, choosing Dennis King as their new leader following Aylward's announcement on 27 September 2018 his intention to resign when his successor was chosen.

=== Historical results from 1993 onwards ===
View source data.
Graph of PEI general election results by share of votes, 1993–2019; omitted are minor parties consistently registering less than 2% of the vote.
View source data.
Graph of PEI general election results by seats won, 1993–2019; those of independent MLAs are omitted.

== Results ==
Map of the 2019 P.E.I. General Election by Electoral Polls

Source : electionspei.ca

Summary of the Legislative Assembly of Prince Edward Island election results
Party	Party leader	Candidates	Seats				Popular vote		
Party	Party leader	Candidates	2015	Dissol.	2019	Change	#	%	Change
Progressive Conservative	Dennis King	27	8	8	13	+5	30,415	36.73	–0.66
Green	Peter Bevan-Baker	27	1	2	8	+7	25,302	30.55	+19.74
Liberal	Wade MacLauchlan	27	18	16	6	–12	24,346	29.41	–11.42
New Democratic	Joe Byrne	24	0	0	0	–	2,454	2.96	–8.01
Independent		3	0	1	0	-	282	0.34	+0.34
Blank and invalid ballots							386	0.46	
Total		108	27	27	27		83,185	100	
Registered voters / turnout							107,109	77.66	

Popular vote
PC	36.73%
Green	30.56%
Liberal	29.40%
New Democratic	2.96%
Others	0.34%

Seats summary
PC	48.15%
Green	29.63%
Liberal	22.22%

=== Synopsis of results ===
2019 PEI general election - synopsis of riding results, grouped by federal riding (Note: "Section 4 - Provincial Electoral Districts Voting Statistics". Report of the Chief Electoral Officer of PEI - 2019 Provincial General Election (PDF). Elections Prince Edward Island. 2019. pp. 39–95.)
Riding	2015	Winning party					Turnout (Note: including spoilt ballots)	Votes (Note: minor political parties receiving less than 1% of the national popular vote are aggregated under "Other"; independent candidates are aggregated separately)					
Riding	2015	Party	Votes	Share	Margin #	Margin %	Turnout	PC	Green	Lib	NDP	Ind	Total
Cardigan
Belfast-Murray River	PC	PC	1,545	52.5%	764	25.9%	77.70%	1,545	781	615	–	–	2,941
Georgetown-Pownal	New	PC	1,493	48.6%	628	20.4%	82.03%	1,493	865	663	49	–	3,070
Georgetown-St. Peters	PC	Dissolved											
Mermaid-Stratford	New	Grn	1,152	38.1%	218	7.2%	78.85%	934	1,152	902	38	–	3,026
Montague-Kilmuir	Lib	PC	1,373	46.4%	588	19.9%	76.63%	1,373	675	785	124	–	2,957
Morell-Donagh	New	PC	1,752	57.6%	1,055	34.7%	79.06%	1,752	697	557	35	–	3,041
Morell-Mermaid	PC	Dissolved											
Souris-Elmira	PC	PC	1,347	44.7%	486	16.1%	81.31%	1,347	804	861	–	–	3,012
Stanhope-Marshfield	New	PC	1,300	39.5%	104	3.1%	81.31%	1,300	747	1,196	46	–	3,289
Stratford-Keppoch	New	PC	1,270	42.5%	388	13.0%	80.80%	1,270	805	882	31	–	2,988
Stratford-Kinlock	PC	Dissolved											
Vernon River-Stratford	Lib	Dissolved											
Malpeque
Borden-Kinkora	PC	PC	1,680	52.1%	639	19.8%	80.33%	1,680	1,041	417	32	54	3,224
Brackley-Hunter River	New	PC	1,315	41.7%	416	13.2%	80.05%	1,315	879	899	57	–	3,150
Cornwall-Meadowbank	Lib	Lib	1,643	47.9%	506	14.8%	80.28%	602	1,137	1,643	48	–	3,430
Kellys Cross-Cumberland	Grn	Dissolved											
Kensington-Malpeque	PC	PC	2,008	62.1%	1,203	37.2%	79.64%	2,008	805	389	31	–	3,233
New Haven-Rocky Point	New	Grn	1,870	53.8%	802	23.1%	82.83%	1,068	1,870	515	–	26	3,479
Rustico-Emerald	PC	PC	1,920	57.5%	1,021	30.6%	80.44%	1,920	899	489	30	–	3,338
York-Oyster Bed	Lib	Dissolved											
Charlottetown
Charlottetown-Belvedere	New	Grn	1,286	40.4%	288	9.1%	75.46%	998	1,286	846	55	–	3,185
Charlottetown-Brighton	Lib	Grn	1,301	40.3%	78	2.4%	78.00%	567	1,301	1,223	138	–	3,229
Charlottetown-Hillsborough Park	New	PC	1,080	43.7%	371	15.0%	60.46%	1,080	709	635	46	–	2,470
Tracadie-Hillsborough Park	Lib	Dissolved											
Charlottetown-Lewis Point	Lib	Dissolved											
Charlottetown-Parkdale	Lib	Dissolved											
Charlottetown-Sherwood	Lib	Dissolved											
Charlottetown-Victoria Park	Lib	Grn	1,272	40.5%	397	12.6%	74.55%	656	1,272	875	338	–	3,141
Charlottetown-West Royalty	New	Lib	1,079	35.2%	113	3.7%	73.18%	766	966	1,079	56	202	3,069
Charlottetown-Winsloe	New	Lib	1,420	42.0%	363	10.8%	80.46%	865	1,057	1,420	41	–	3,383
West Royalty-Springvale	Lib	Dissolved											
Egmont
Alberton-Bloomfield	New	PC	1,312	45.5%	159	5.5%	81.37%	1,312	317	1,153	99	–	2,881
Alberton-Roseville	Lib	Dissolved											
Evangeline-Miscouche	Lib	Lib	1,100	44.6%	339	13.8%	77.89%	575	761	1,100	33	–	2,469
O'Leary-Inverness	Lib	Lib	1,102	40.9%	204	7.6%	79.02%	462	231	1,102	898	–	2,693
Summerside-St. Eleanors	Lib	Dissolved											
Summerside-South Drive	New	Green	1,302	43.9%	364	12.3%	66.62%	662	1,302	938	65	–	2,967
Summerside-Wilmot	Lib	Green	1,258	39.0%	221	6.9%	74.34%	1,037	1,258	892	39	–	3,226
Tignish-Palmer Road	Lib	Lib	1,388	49.3%	586	20.8%	81.71%	802	584	1,388	44	–	2,818
Tyne Valley-Linkletter	Lib	Dissolved											
Tyne Valley-Sherbrooke	New	Green	1,101	35.6%	75	2.4%	75.98%	1,026	1,101	882	81	–	3,090

= open seat
= turnout is above provincial average
= incumbent re-elected in same riding
= previously incumbent in another riding
= other incumbent renominated

Resulting composition of the 66th General Assembly of Prince Edward Island
Seats		Party			
Redistribution status	Reason	PC	Grn	Lib	Total
New seats	Taken by previous incumbents from other ridings	3	2	1	6
New seats	Ouster of previous incumbent			1	1
New seats	Previous incumbents defeated	2	2		4
New seats	Open seats gained	3			3
New seats	Subtotal	8	4	2	14
Seats carried over	Seats retained by incumbents	5		4	9
Seats carried over	Incumbents defeated		3		3
Seats carried over	Open seats gained		1		1
Total		13	8	6	27

=== Results by region ===
Regional summary of results (2019)
Region	Seats won			Vote share (%)				Change (pp)				
Region	PC	Grn	Lib	PC	Grn	Lib	NDP	PC	Grn	Lib	NDP	Major swing
Cardigan	6	1	–	46.18	27.47	25.03	1.32	+1.23	+22.02	-13.13	-6.53	→ 17.58
Malpeque	5	1	1	42.75	31.88	23.97	1.05	+4.54	+13.12	-12.36	-5.64	→ 12.74
Charlottetown	1	3	2	26.69	35.67	32.89	3.64	-4.39	+23.26	-7.80	-12.18	→ 17.72
Egmont	1	3	3	29.18	27.58	37.02	6.23	-5.79	+21.57	-11.98	-3.78	→ 16.78
Total	13	8	6	36.73	30.56	29.40	2.96	-0.66	+19.75	-11.43	-8.02	→ 15.59

=== Detailed analysis ===
Position attained in seats contested
Party	1st	2nd	3rd	4th
Progressive Conservative	13	6	8	–
Green	8	11	7	1
Liberal	6	9	12	–
New Democratic	–	1	–	21
Independent	–	–	–	3

Principal races, according to 1st and 2nd-place results
Parties		Seats
█ Progressive Conservative	█ Green	12
█ Progressive Conservative	█ Liberal	7
█ Green	█ Liberal	7
█ Liberal	█ New Democratic	1
Total		27

== Timeline ==
=== 2015 ===
- 4 May – The Liberal Party, led by Premier Wade MacLauchlan, wins a majority government and the Progressive Conservative Party forms the opposition. The Green Party, under leader Peter Bevan-Baker, wins its first ever seat, with Bevan-Baker winning Kellys Cross-Cumberland.
- 23 September – Progressive Conservative leader Rob Lantz resigns, effective that day.
- 15 October – Jamie Fox, MLA for Borden-Kinkora, is chosen as the Progressive Conservative interim leader, defeating opponent Darlene Compton.

=== 2016 ===
- 1 August – Liberal MLA for Summerside-Wilmot Janice Sherry resigns her seat.
- 17 October – Chris Palmer is elected in the Summerside-Wilmot by-election, retaining the seat for the Liberals.
- 27 October – Voting for the 2016 Plebiscite on Democratic Renewal, a non-binding referendum on changing the electoral system, begins.
- 7 November – Voting in the 2016 Plebiscite on Democratic Renewal ends, indicating mixed member proportional representation as the preferred choice for electing MLAs.
- 22 November – The Legislative Assembly does not adopt the Plebiscite on Democratic Renewal's results and instead approves a motion to hold a second referendum at the next provincial election.

=== 2017 ===
- 19 October – Liberal MLA for Charlottetown-Parkdale Doug Currie resigns his seat.
- 20 October – James Aylward, MLA for Stratford-Kinlock, is chosen as the Progressive Conservative leader, defeating opponent Brad Trivers.
- 27 November – Green candidate Hannah Bell wins the by-election to fill the seat of Charlottetown-Parkdale, doubling the Green caucus to two and becoming the first time in PEI politics, that a provincial third-party won a by-election.

=== 2018 ===
- 31 January – MLA for West Royalty-Springvale Bush Dumville leaves the Liberal Party, becomes an independent.
- 14 February – Anticipating an early General Election, the Greens call for potential candidates "to make themselves known".
- 7 April – Joe Byrne is elected leader of the New Democratic Party of Prince Edward Island.
- 13 June – The Electoral System Referendum Act is passed by the Legislative Assembly, scheduling a referendum on electoral reform for the same date as the provincial election. Voters will be asked if they support Prince Edward Island changing its electoral system to mixed-member proportional representation.
- 17 September – Progressive Conservative leader James Aylward announces pending resignation, to take effect upon selection of successor.

=== 2019 ===
- 1 February – Campaign period for the electoral reform referendum begins, making an election likely for the spring.
- 9 February – Dennis King is elected leader of the Progressive Conservative Party of Prince Edward Island.
- 26 March – Premier Wade MacLauchlan advises Lieutenant Governor Antoinette Perry to dissolve the legislature and call an early election.
- 20 April – The election in the riding of Charlottetown-Hillsborough Park is formally delayed as a result of the death of Green Party candidate Josh Underhay.
- 23 April – General election held.
- 13 June – Deferred election date announced for Charlottetown-Hillsborough Park.
- 6 July – Advance voting in Charlottetown-Hillsborough Park deferred election began, also took place on 8 and 12 July.
- 15 July – Charlottetown-Hillsborough Park deferred election held, Progressive Conservative candidate Natalie Jameson is elected.

== Opinion polls ==
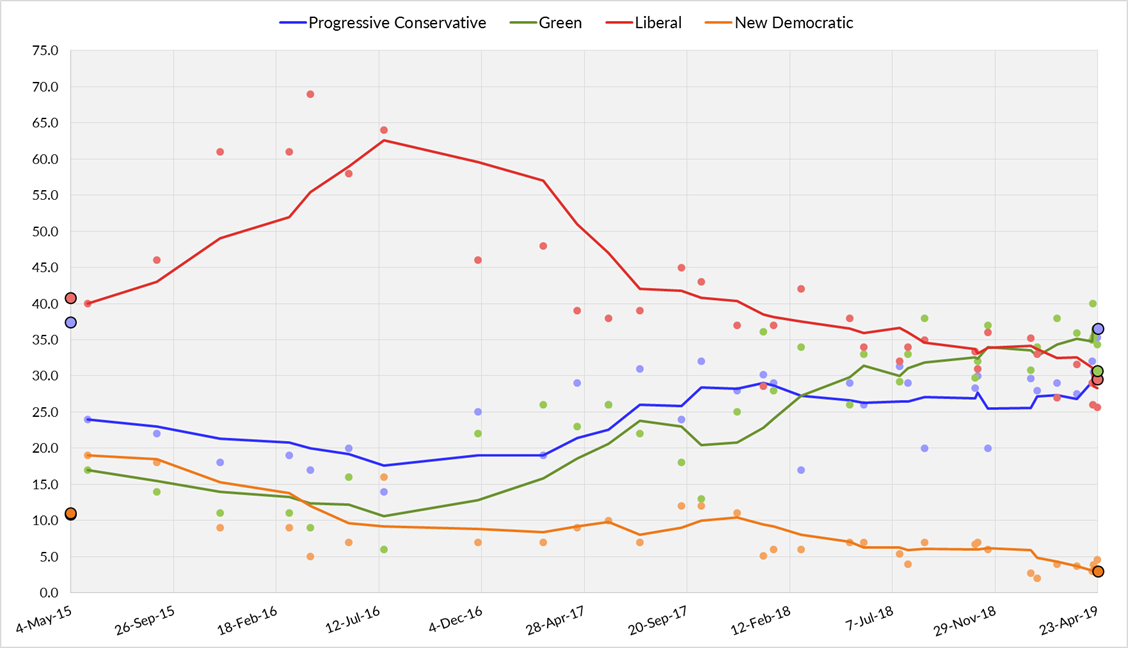

The following is a list of scientific opinion polls of published voter intentions.

Date(s) conducted	Polling organisation/client	Sample size	Liberal	PC	Green	NDP	Lead
18 – 22 April 2019	Forum Research	1073	25.7%	35.3%	34.3%	4.6%	1%
14 – 17 April 2019	Mainstreet Research	636	29.2%	30.5%	35.4%	3.9%	4.9%
12 – 15 April 2019	Narrative Research	539	29%	32%	35%	3%	3%
11 – 16 April 2019	MQO Research	400	26%	29%	40%	3%	11%
26 March 2019	General election called for 23 April						
23 – 24 March 2019	Mainstreet Research	691	31.6%	27.5%	35.9%	3.7%	4.3%
2 – 24 February 2019	Corporate Research Associates	301	27%	29%	38%	4%	9%
9 February 2019	Dennis King is elected as the leader of Prince Edward Island PC Party						
21 – 27 January 2019	MQO Research	400	33%	28%	34%	2%	1%
15 – 18 January 2019	Mainstreet Research	731	35.2%	29.6%	30.8%	2.7%	4.4%
2 – 19 November 2018	Corporate Research Associates	637	36%	20%	37%	6%	1%
30 Oct – 1 November 2018	Mainstreet Research	637	33.4%	28.3%	29.7%	6.7%	3.7%
22 Oct – 4 November 2018	MQO Research	400	31%	30%	32%	7%	1%
2–21 August 2018	Corporate Research Associates	300	35%	20%	38%	7%	3%
15–17 July 2018	Mainstreet Research	731	32.0%	31.3%	29.2%	5.4%	0.7%
12–29 July 2018	MQO Research	400	34%	29%	33%	4%	1%
2–28 May 2018	Corporate Research Associates	600	34%	26%	33%	7%	1%
16 Apr – 8 May 2018	MQO Research	400	38%	29%	26%	7%	9%
7 April 2018	Joe Byrne is elected as the leader of New Democratic Party of Prince Edward Island						
2–28 Feb 2018	Corporate Research Associates	300	42%	17%	34%	6%	8%
15–20 Jan 2018	MQO Research	400	37%	29%	28%	6%	8%
4–6 Jan 2018	Mainstreet Research	647	28.6%	30.2%	36.1%	5.1%	5.9%
1–30 Nov 2017	Corporate Research Associates	600	37%	28%	25%	11%	9%
20 October 2017	James Aylward announces his resignation as the leader of Prince Edward Island PC Party						
3–10 Oct 2017	MQO Research	400	43%	32%	13%	12%	11%
3 Aug – 5 September 2017	Corporate Research Associates	304	45%	24%	18%	12%	21%
15 July 2017	MQO Research		39%	31%	22%	7%	8%
9 May–1 June 2017	Corporate Research Associates	304	38%	26%	26%	10%	12%
18 April 2017	MQO Research		39%	29%	23%	9%	10%
3 Feb – 1 March 2017	Corporate Research Associates	304	48%	19%	26%	7%	22%
16 January 2017	MQO Research		44%	26%	24%	6%	18%
7–29 Nov 2016	Corporate Research Associates	300	46%	25%	22%	7%	21%
2 October 2016	MQO Research		56%	25%	7%	11%	31%
9–31 Aug 2016	Corporate Research Associates	301	64%	19%	9%	8%	45%
19 July 2016	MQO Research		64%	14%	6%	16%	48%
6–30 May 2016	Corporate Research Associates	300	58%	20%	16%	7%	38%
6 April 2016	MQO Research		69%	17%	9%	5%	52%
9 Feb – 7 March 2016	Corporate Research Associates	309	61%	19%	11%	9%	42%
6 Nov – 1 December 2015	Corporate Research Associates	301	61%	18%	11%	9%	43%
25 October 2015	Jamie Fox is elected as interim leader of Prince Edward Island PC Party						
10 Aug – 2 September 2015	Corporate Research Associates	304	46%	22%	14%	18%	24%
11–28 May 2015	Corporate Research Associates	300	40%	24%	17%	19%	16%
4 May 2015	General election results	81,998	40.8%	37.4%	10.8%	11.0%	3.4%

== Candidates ==
- Party leaders' names are in **bold**; cabinet ministers' names are in italics.
- Incumbents not running for re-election are denoted with a dagger †.

=== Cardigan ===
Electoral district	Candidates					Incumbent
Electoral district	Liberal	PC	Green	NDP	Independent	Incumbent
4. Belfast-Murray River	Ian MacPherson; 615 - 20.91%	Darlene Compton; 1,545 - 52.53%	James Sanders; 781 - 26.56%		~~Andy Clarey~~ (Note: District 4 Belfast-Murray River independent candidate Andy Clarey withdrew from the election on 19 April. Because he withdrew after the close of nominations, his name appeared on ballots. Votes cast for Clarey will be considered spoiled.)	Darlene Compton
2. Georgetown-Pownal	Kevin Doyle; 663 - 21.60%	Steven Myers; 1,493 - 48.63%	Susan Hartley; 865 - 28.18%	Edith Perry; 49 - 1.60%		Steven Myers; Georgetown-St. Peters
5. Mermaid-Stratford	Randy Cooper; 902 - 29.81%	Mary Ellen McInnis; 934 - 30.87%	Michele Beaton; 1,152 - 38.07%	Lawrence Millar; 38 - 1.26%		Alan McIsaac†; Vernon River-Stratford
3. Montague-Kilmuir	Daphne Griffin; 785 -26.55%	Cory Deagle; 1,373 - 46.43%	John Allen MacLean; 675 - 22.83%	Billy Cann; 124 - 4.19%		Allen Roach†
7. Morell-Donagh	Susan Myers; 557 - 18.32%	Sidney MacEwen; 1,752 - 57.61%	Kyle MacDonald; 697 - 22.92%	Margaret Andrade; 35 - 1.15%		Sidney MacEwen; Morell-Mermaid
1. Souris-Elmira	Tommy Kickham; 861 - 28.59%	Colin LaVie; 1,347 - 44.72%	Boyd Leard; 804 - 26.69%			Colin LaVie
8. Stanhope-Marshfield	**Wade MacLauchlan**; 1,196 - 36.36%	Bloyce Thompson; 1,300 - 39.53%	Sarah Donald; 747 - 22.71%	Marian White; 46 - 1.40%		**Wade MacLauchlan**; York-Oyster Bed
6. Stratford-Keppoch	David Dunphy; 882 - 29.52%	James Aylward; 1,270 - 42.50%	Devon Strang; 805 - 26.94%	Lynne Thiele; 31 - 1.04%		James Aylward; Stratford-Kinlock

=== Malpeque ===
Electoral district	Candidates					Incumbent
Electoral district	Liberal	PC	Green	NDP	Independent	Incumbent
19. Borden-Kinkora	Jamie Stride; 417 - 12.93%	Jamie Fox; 1,680 - 52.11%	Matthew MacFarlane; 1,041 - 32.29%	Joan Gauvin; 32 - 0.99%	Fred McCardle; 54 - 1.67%	Jamie Fox
15. Brackley-Hunter River	Windsor Wight; 899 - 28.54%	**Dennis King**; 1,315 - 41.75%	Greg Bradley; 879 - 27.90%	Leah-Jane Hayward; 57 - 1.81%		Bush Dumville; West Royalty-Springvale
16. Cornwall-Meadowbank	Heath MacDonald; 1,643 - 47.90%	Elaine Barnes; 602 - 17.55%	Ellen Jones; 1,137 - 33.15%	Craig Nash; 48 - 1.40%		Heath MacDonald
20. Kensington-Malpeque	Nancy Beth Guptill; 389 - 12.03%	Matthew MacKay; 2,008 - 62.11%	Matthew J. MacKay; 805 - 24.90%	Carole MacFarlane; 31 - 0.96%		Matthew MacKay
17. New Haven-Rocky Point	Judy MacNevin; 515 - 14.80%	Kris Currie; 1,068 - 30.70%	**Peter Bevan-Baker**; 1,870 - 53.75%		Don Wills; 26 - 0.75%	**Peter Bevan-Baker**; Kellys Cross-Cumberland
18. Rustico-Emerald	Alexander (Sandy) MacKay; 489 - 14.65%	Brad Trivers; 1,920 - 57.52%	Colin Jeffrey; 899 - 26.93%	Sean Deagle; 30 - 0.90%		Brad Trivers

=== Charlottetown ===
Electoral district	Candidates					Incumbent
Electoral district	Liberal	PC	Green	NDP	Independent	Incumbent
11. Charlottetown-Belvedere	Roxanne Carter-Thompson; 846 - 26.56%	Ronnie Carragher; 998 - 31.33%	Hannah Bell; 1,286 - 40.38%	Trevor Leclerc; 55 - 1.73%		Hannah Bell; Charlottetown-Parkdale
13. Charlottetown-Brighton	Jordan Brown; 1,223 - 37.88%	Donna Hurry; 567 - 17.56%	Ole Hammarlund; 1,301 - 40.29%	Simone Webster; 138 - 4.27%		Jordan Brown
9. Charlottetown-Hillsborough Park	Karen Lavers; 635 25.71%	Natalie Jameson; 1,080 43.72%	John Andrew; 709 - 28.70%	Gordon Gay; 46 - 1.86%		Buck Watts†; Tracadie-Hillsborough Park
9. Charlottetown-Hillsborough Park	Election deferred, held on 15 July 2019 due to the death of Green Party candidate Josh Underhay (Note: District 9 PC candidate Sarah Stewart-Clark withdrew her candidacy on 27 May.)					Buck Watts†; Tracadie-Hillsborough Park
12. Charlottetown-Victoria Park	Richard Brown; 875 - 27.86%	Tim Keizer; 656 - 20.89%	Karla Bernard; 1,272 - 40.50%	**Joe Byrne**; 338 - 10.76%		Richard Brown
14. Charlottetown-West Royalty	Gord McNeilly; 1,079 - 35.16%	Angus Birt; 766 - 24.96%	Gavin Hall; 966 - 31.48%	Janis Newman; 56 - 1.82%	Bush Dumville; 202 - 6.58%	Kathleen Casey†; Charlottetown-Lewis Point
10. Charlottetown-Winsloe	Robert Mitchell; 1,420 - 41.97%	Mike Gillis; 865 - 25.57%	Amanda Morrison; 1,057 - 31.24%	Jesse Reddin Cousins; 41 - 1.21%		Robert Mitchell; Charlottetown-Sherwood

=== Egmont ===
Electoral district	Candidates				Incumbent
Electoral district	Liberal	PC	Green	NDP	Incumbent
26. Alberton-Bloomfield	Pat Murphy; 1,153 - 40.02%	Ernie Hudson; 1,312 - 45.54%	James McKenna; 317 - 11.00%	Michelle Arsenault; 99 - 3.44%	Pat Murphy; Alberton-Roseville
24. Evangeline-Miscouche	Sonny Gallant; 1,100 - 44.55%	Jason Woodbury; 575 - 23.29%	Nick Arsenault; 761 - 30.82%	Grant Gallant; 33 - 1.34%	Sonny Gallant
25. O'Leary-Inverness	Robert Henderson; 1,102 - 40.92%	Barb Broome; 462 - 17.16%	Jason Charette; 231 - 8.58%	Herb Dickieson; 898 - 33.35%	Robert Henderson
22. Summerside-South Drive	Tina Mundy; 938 - 31.61%	Paul Walsh; 662 - 22.31%	Steve Howard; 1,302 - 43.88%	Garth Oatway; 65 - 2.19%	Tina Mundy; Summerside-St. Eleanors
21. Summerside-Wilmot	Chris Palmer; 892 - 27.65%	Tyler DesRoches; 1,037 - 32.15%	Lynne Lund; 1,258 - 39.00%	Paulette Halupa; 39 - 1.21%	Chris Palmer
27. Tignish-Palmer Road	Hal Perry; 1,388 - 49.25%	Melissa Handrahan; 802 - 28.46%	Sean Doyle; 584 - 20.72%	Dale Ryan; 44 - 1.56%	Hal Perry
23. Tyne Valley-Sherbrooke	Paula Biggar; 882 - 28.54%	Hilton MacLennan; 1,026 - 33.20%	Trish Altass; 1,101 - 35.63%	Robin Enman; 81 - 2.62%	Paula Biggar; Tyne Valley-Linkletter
