= Steve Howard (politician) =

Canadian politician

Member of the Legislative Assembly of Prince Edward Island for Summerside-South Drive
- In office April 23, 2019 – March 6, 2023
- Preceded by: Riding established
- Succeeded by: Barb Ramsay

Personal details
- Party: Green

Steve Howard is a Canadian politician, who was elected to the Legislative Assembly of Prince Edward Island in the 2019 Prince Edward Island general election. He represented the district of Summerside-South Drive as a member of the Green Party of Prince Edward Island. He was the shadow critic for energy and transportation. He was defeated in the 2023 general election.

He previously worked for Renewable Lifestyles Ltd.

== Election results ==
2023 Prince Edward Island general election: Summerside-South Drive
| Party | Candidate | Votes | % | ±% |
|---|---|---|---|---|
| Progressive Conservative | Barb Ramsay | 1,378 | 53.3 | +31.0 |
| Green | Steve Howard | 739 | 28.6 | -15.3 |
| Liberal | Nancy Beth Guptill | 397 | 15.4 | -16.3 |
| New Democratic | Kathryn Yule | 70 | 2.7 | +0.5 |
| Total valid votes | | 2,584 | 100.0 | |
| Progressive Conservative gain from Green | | Swing | | +23.1 |

2019 Prince Edward Island general election: Summerside-South Drive
| Party | Candidate | Votes | % | ±% |
|---|---|---|---|---|
| Green | Steve Howard | 1302 | 43.9 | |
| Liberal | Tina Mundy | 938 | 31.6 | |
| Progressive Conservative | Paul Walsh | 662 | 22.3 | |
| New Democratic | Trevor Leclerc | 65 | 2.2 | |
| Total valid votes | | 2967 | 100.00 | |
| Green gain | | Swing | | |
