= New Haven-Rocky Point =

Provincial electoral district in Prince Edward Island, Canada

Prince Edward Island electoral district

Provincial electoral district
- Legislature: Legislative Assembly of Prince Edward Island
MLA
Peter Bevan-Baker
Green
- District created: 2019
- First contested: 2019
- Last contested: 2023

New Haven-Rocky Point (District 17) is a provincial electoral district for the Legislative Assembly of Prince Edward Island, Canada. The district was contested for the first time in the 2019 Prince Edward Island general election.

== Members ==
The riding has elected the following members of the Legislative Assembly:

Members of the Legislative Assembly for New Haven-Rocky Point
Assembly	Years	Member	Party
66th	2019–2023	Peter Bevan-Baker	Green
67th	2023–present	Peter Bevan-Baker	Green

== Election results ==
=== New Haven-Rock Point, 2019–present ===
2023 Prince Edward Island general election
Party	Candidate	Votes	%	±%
Green	Peter Bevan-Baker	1,457	42.8	-11.0
Progressive Conservative	Donalda Docherty	1,351	39.6	+8.9
Liberal	Sharon Cameron	502	14.7	-0.1
New Democratic	Douglas Dahn	49	1.4	
Island	Neil Emery	49	1.4	
Total valid votes		3,408	100.0	
Green hold		Swing		-10.0

2019 Prince Edward Island general election
Party	Candidate	Votes	%	±%
Green	Peter Bevan-Baker	1,869	53.7%	+0.8
Progressive Conservative	Kris Currie	1,068	30.7%	+12.8
Liberal	Judy MacNevin	515	14.8%	-12.6
Independent	Don Wills	26	0.7%	
This is a newly created district

2015 Prince Edward Island general election redistributed results
Party	Votes	%
Green	1,656	52.9
Liberal	856	27.4
Progressive Conservative	559	17.9
New Democratic	57	1.8
Source(s) Source: Ridingbuilder

== See also ==
- List of Prince Edward Island provincial electoral districts
- Canadian provincial electoral districts
