= Gary Robichaud =

Canadian politician (1962–2005)

Leader of the New Democratic Party of Prince Edward Island
- In office 2002 – June 23, 2005
- Preceded by: Herb Dickieson
- Succeeded by: Dean Constable

Personal details
- Born: September 13, 1962 Saint John, New Brunswick
- Died: September 8, 2005 (aged 42) Ross Corner, Prince Edward Island
- Party: New Democratic Party of Prince Edward Island
- Profession: High School Teacher

Gary Robichaud (September 13, 1962 – September 8, 2005) was a Canadian teacher and politician, and leader of the Island New Democrats political party in the province of Prince Edward Island.

Robichaud was born in Saint John, New Brunswick. He spent his childhood on Prince Edward Island, attending Evangeline Regional High School and then the University of Prince Edward Island.

Robichaud began teaching in rural Manitoba, where he met his wife, Jacqueline. His daughter, Julia was born in 2001. [5] In 1995, he moved back to Prince Edward Island to become a high-school teacher in Summerside. For many years, he taught at Three Oaks Senior High School, during which time he helmed Canada's only intramural Reach for the Top league.

Joining the Island New Democrats, Robichaud ran unsuccessfully in the 2000 provincial election. In 2002, he ran for the leadership of the party, and won with 62 votes over Ken Bingham with 18 and Deborah Kelly-Hawkes with 4.

He was diagnosed with inoperable lung cancer in late 2003. On June 23, 2005, he announced his resignation as New Democratic leader due to his poor health. He died on September 8, 2005, in Ross Corner.

He was replaced as New Democratic Party leader in 2006 by Dean Constable.
