= Trish Altass =

Canadian politician

Member of the Legislative Assembly of Prince Edward Island for Tyne Valley-Sherbrooke
- In office April 23, 2019 – March 6, 2023
- Preceded by: Riding established
- Succeeded by: Hilton MacLennan

Personal details
- Party: Green

Trish Altass is a Canadian politician, who was elected to the Legislative Assembly of Prince Edward Island in the 2019 Prince Edward Island general election. She represented the district of Tyne Valley-Sherbrooke as a member of the Green Party of Prince Edward Island.

She lost her seat in the 2023 general election.
