= Ole Hammarlund =

Canadian politician

Member of the Legislative Assembly of Prince Edward Island for Charlottetown-Brighton
- In office April 23, 2019 – March 6, 2023
- Preceded by: Jordan Brown
- Succeeded by: Rob Lantz

Personal details
- Born: Denmark
- Party: Green
- Occupation: architect

Ole Hammarlund is a Canadian politician who was elected to the Legislative Assembly of Prince Edward Island in the 2019 Prince Edward Island general election. He represented the district of Charlottetown-Brighton as a member of the Green Party of Prince Edward Island.

== Early life and career ==
Born and raised in Denmark, Hammarlund studied architecture at the Massachusetts Institute of Technology, and moved to Prince Edward Island in 1977 after being commissioned to design The Ark, an experimental sustainable housing project in Spry Point.

== Political career ==
In 2019, he was elected as MLA for Charlottetown-Brighton, he served as opposition critic for Transportation and Infrastructure.

=== Defeat ===
On March 6, 2023, he lost the Green nomination to Janice Harper, for his district.

== Election results ==
2019 Prince Edward Island general election: Charlottetown-Brighton
Party	Candidate	Votes	%	±%
Green	Ole Hammarlund	1,310	40.57	+27.52
Liberal	Jordan Brown	1,223	37.88	-1.14
Progressive Conservative	Donna Hurry	567	17.56	-20.58
New Democratic	Simone Webster	128	3.96	-5.83
Total valid votes		3,229	100.0	
Green gain from Liberal		Swing		+13.20
