= Karla Bernard =

Canadian politician

Karla Bernard MLA

Member of the Legislative Assembly of Prince Edward Island for Charlottetown-Victoria Park
- Incumbent
- Assumed office April 23, 2019
- Preceded by: Richard Brown

Interim Leader of the Green Party of Prince Edward Island
- In office July 21, 2023 – June 7, 2025
- Preceded by: Peter Bevan-Baker
- Succeeded by: Matt MacFarlane

Personal details
- Party: Green

Karla Bernard is a Canadian politician, who was elected to the Legislative Assembly of Prince Edward Island in the 2019 Prince Edward Island general election. She represents the district of Charlottetown-Victoria Park as a member of the Green Party of Prince Edward Island.

She was re-elected in the 2023 general election. She served as interim Green Party leader from July 21, 2023 until June 7, 2025 when Matt MacFarlane was elected as the leader of the party.

== Electoral record ==
2023 Prince Edward Island general election: Charlottetown-Victoria Park
| Party | Candidate | Votes | % | ±% |
|---|---|---|---|---|
| Green | Karla Bernard | 1,052 | 42.0 | +1.5 |
| Progressive Conservative | Tim Keizer | 978 | 39.0 | +18.2 |
| Liberal | Barb MacLeod | 293 | 11.7 | -16.2 |
| New Democratic | Joe Byrne | 150 | 6.0 | -4.8 |
| Island | Danni Moher | 32 | 1.3 | |
| Total valid votes | | 2,505 | 100.0 | |
| Green hold | | Swing | | -4.8 |

2019 Prince Edward Island general election: Charlottetown-Victoria Park
| Party | Candidate | Votes | % | ±% | Expenditures |
|---|---|---|---|---|---|
| Green | Karla Bernard | 1,272 | 40.5 | +21.7 | $5,713.87 |
| Liberal | Richard Brown | 875 | 27.9 | -11.5 | $8,745.20 |
| Progressive Conservative | Tim Keizer | 656 | 20.9 | -6.6 | $8,352.69 |
| New Democratic | Joe Byrne | 338 | 10.8 | -3.6 | $20,244.92 |
| Total valid votes/expense limit | | 3,141 | 99.5 | | $11,564.28 |
| Rejected ballots | | 17 | 0.5 | | |
| Turnout | | 3,158 | 74.55 | −6.1 | |
| Eligible voters | | 4,236 | | | |
| Green gain from Liberal | | Swing | | +14.4 | |
Source: Elections PEI
