= 2019 Progressive Conservative Party of Prince Edward Island leadership election =

Canadian provincial political party election

- Date: February 9, 2019
- Convention: Eastlink Centre, Charlottetown
- Resigning leader: James Aylward
- Won by: Dennis King
- Ballots: 2
- Candidates: 5
- Entrance fee: $7,500
- Spending limit: TBD

The Progressive Conservative Party of Prince Edward Island held a leadership election on February 9, 2019, following the resignation of leader James Aylward. Five candidates were registered at the close of nominations on November 30, 2018. Dennis King was elected leader, on the second ballot.

== Candidates ==
- Allan Dale, declared November 13, 2018.
- Dennis King, declared November 21, 2018.
- Shawn Driscoll, declared November 23, 2018.
- Sarah Stewart-Clark, declared November 26, 2018.
- Kevin Arsenault, declared December 5, 2018.

== Results ==
First Ballot:

- Dennis King – 2,014
- Allan Dale – 746
- Kevin Arsenault – 590
- Sarah Stewart-Clark – 527
- Shawn Driscoll – 307

Second Ballot:

- Dennis King – 2,071
- Allan Dale – 803
- Kevin Arsenault – 661
- Sarah Stewart-Clark – 601
