= Island Party =

Island Party of Prince Edward Island
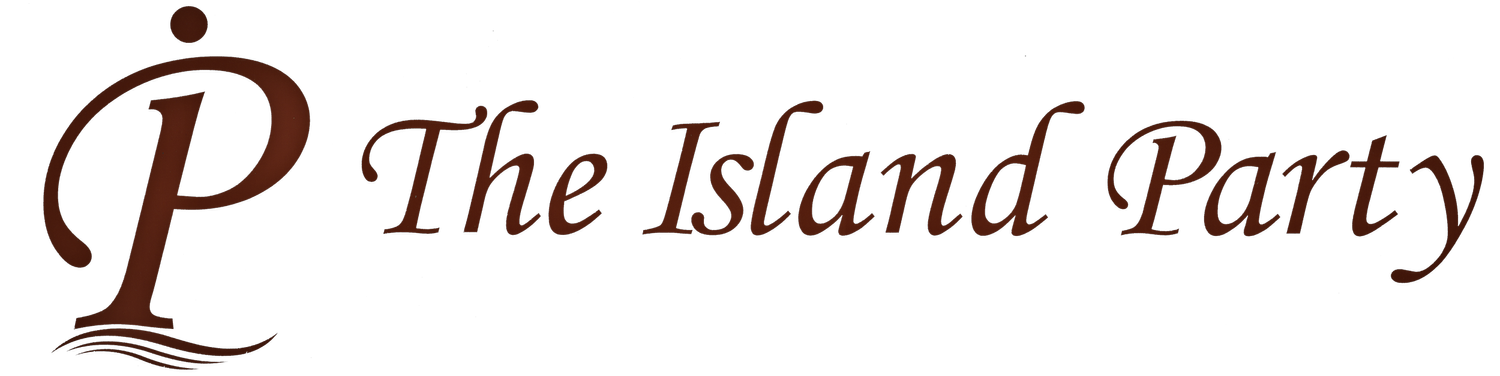
- Leader: Mike McCormick (interim)
- President: Vacant
- Founded: 2007; officially on March 5, 2010
- Headquarters: PO Box 863 Montague, PEI C0A 1R0
- Ideology: Direct democracy Green conservatism
- Political position: Centre-right

Website
- https://www.islandparty.ca/

The Island Party of Prince Edward Island, also known as the Island Party of PEI or the Island Party for short, is a Canadian political party active in Prince Edward Island.

== History ==
Flag of Prince Edward Island frequently used by the party

The Island Party of Prince Edward Island formed after the 2007 election. The party officially registered on March 5, 2010, and the first leader of the party was Jay Gallant, who served in an interim role.

In March 2011, former Liberal candidate Billy Cann was acclaimed as the leader of the party. The party fielded 12 candidates in the 2011 election under Cann.

On August 9, 2012, Cann announced that he was leaving the party to join the NDP.

On March 1, 2015, Paul Smitz was named the interim leader of the party. However, the party was deregistered later that year, when it failed to nominate the required 10 candidates for the 2015 election and did not file an information return.

The party re-registered on September 9, 2022. Party president, Paul Smitz, cited Liberal and PC governments' failure to rescind the controversial Municipal Government Act as a significant reason for the party re-forming. In addition to serving as president, Smitz was also the acting leader of the relaunched party.

On March 10, 2023, Ahava Kálnássy de Kálnás was appointed as the party leader.

The party nominated 11 candidates for the 2023 election under leader Ahava Kálnássy de Kálnás, electing none and receiving 0.55% percent of the popular vote.

Party leader Ahava Kálnássy de Kálnás said they were proud of their diverse candidates which were distributed across the province, though she was disappointed that they weren't invited to any leaders’ debates.

Ahava Kálnássy de Kálnás was removed as party leader on February 11, 2024, by a non-confidence vote from the membership.

In June 2025, Mike McCormick was listed as the new interim leader by Elections PEI.

== Ideology ==
Political scientist of University of Prince Edward Island (UPEI), Don Desserud, described the party's platform as "right-leaning" with "some progressive social policy," and compared the party to the United Farmers movement.

Members of the party participated in the 2022 Freedom Convoy protests against COVID-19 public health mandates.

== Platform ==
=== Regionalization ambitions ===
The Island Party sees regionalization as an attempt to unload some of the tax burden for major infrastructure on rural Islanders.

Noticeably, the Island Party wants to review the Municipal Government Act (MGA), which the group considers it to be contentious, in order to ensure democracy is respected. Furthermore, to make sure that local residents have a say in how money is spent within municipalities, the Island Party proposed a vote on yearly budgets in every city in PEI. They believe that by doing so, the Minister's powers will be reduced and the government will no longer be able to create or restructure municipalities without approval from residents.

The Island Party also believes that regional cooperation should be promoted through the creation of economic development zones. Representatives from community councils and industry sectors within these zones could be elected to serve on a regional board while preserving and strengthening the Islanders' communities.

=== Plank ===
Besides regionalization, as per the party's website, the party's plank is as follows:

- Water conservation: preserving natural water across the island and ensuring safe drinking water to all Islanders
- Direct democracy: introducing recall elections, referendums, and citizen initiative
- Land conservation: enforcing the Lands Protection Act and closing loopholes, and protecting natural wildlife and soils

== Leaders ==
Leader	Term in office		Notes
Jay Gallant	March 5, 2010	March 2011	Interim
Billy Cann	March 2011	August 9, 2012	
Paul Smitz	March 1, 2015	2015	Interim
Paul Smitz	September 9, 2022	March 10, 2023	Acting
Ahava Kálnássy de Kálnás	March 10, 2023	February 11, 2024	
Mike McCormick	June 2025	present	Interim

== Electoral record ==
Election	Leader	Candidates	Seats	Votes	%	Place	Position
2011	Billy Cann	12 / 27	0 / 27	682	0.91%	5th	Extra-parliamentary
2023	Ahava Kálnássy de Kálnás	11 / 27	0 / 27	411	0.55%	5th	Extra-parliamentary
