= Elections Prince Edward Island =

Agency overview
- Formed: 1965
- Jurisdiction: Elections and plebiscites on PEI
- Headquarters: 176 Great George St., Suite 160; Charlottetown, Prince Edward Island
- Annual budget: $675,000
- Agency executive: Tim G Garrity, Chief Electoral Officer
- Website: Official website

Elections Prince Edward Island is the Prince Edward Island non-partisan agency of the legislative assembly charged with running provincial elections, referendums, and municipal elections.
