= Green Party of Prince Edward Island =

Provincial political party in Canada

- Leader: Matt MacFarlane
- President: Charlotte Sullivan
- Deputy Leader: Karla Bernard
- Founded: 2005; 21 years ago
- Headquarters: 81 Prince Street; Charlottetown, Prince Edward Island; C1A 4R3
- Membership (2025): ▲800
- Ideology: Green politics Green liberalism Social democracy
- Political position: Centre-left
- Seats in Legislature: 4 / 27

Website
- www.greenparty.pe.ca

The Green Party of Prince Edward Island, or Green Party of PEI, is a registered provincial political party and one of the three major parties in Prince Edward Island, Canada. The party was founded by Sharon Labchuk, a political organizer for the federal Green Party of Canada. It is a party in the international green political tradition, espousing environmentalism, grassroots democracy, and social justice.

The party was registered in 2005 and first ran candidates in the 2007 general election. In the 2015 election, the party elected its first member of the provincial legislature: leader Peter Bevan-Baker defeated a Liberal incumbent to win the district of Kellys Cross-Cumberland with 54% of the vote. The party won 8 seats in the 2019 election and, as the second largest party in the legislature, formed the Official Opposition for the first time in the history of any Green party in Canada.

== History ==
=== Founding (2005–2012) ===
The Green Party ran 18 candidates during its first election in May 2007, winning 3.04% of the vote, or 4.44% in ridings contested, and replacing the Island New Democrats as the Island's third party. The result was the first time a Green Party had bested a New Democratic Party at the federal or provincial level in Canada. A third of all candidates won more than 5.40%. Jamie Larkin had the best result of 8.45%, followed by dentist Peter Bevan-Baker at 6.84%, Cindy Burton at 6.68%, Party leader Sharon Labchuk at 6.03%, Denise Reiser at 5.79%, and Jodie Bowmaster at 5.40%. All other candidates captured less than 5.0%; however, 14 out of the 18 candidates had placed ahead of the NDP, with two of the four candidates who finished fourth doing so by just one and two votes.

The party ran a candidate in the 2007 by-election to replace Pat Binns in the riding of Belfast-Murray River. Candidate Ahmon Katz finished with 3.2%, ahead of NDP candidate Jane McNeil.

In the 2011 general election, the party increased its number of candidates from 18 in the 2007 election to 22, and upped the vote share from 3% to 4.4%, or 5.3% in ridings contested, beating out the Island New Democrats for third place again. The party increased its votes per riding from 138 to 147, even though turnout in the province fell from 84% to 77%. Party leader Sharon Labchuk, running in Charlottetown-Victoria Park, had the best result at 12.82%, followed by Elizabeth Schoales in Charlottetown-Brighton at 10.17%, and Peter Bevan-Baker in Kellys Cross-Cumberland at 9.36%. At 59%, the party had the highest number of women candidates in the 2011 election. The Green Party was the first Canadian political party to run more than 50% women candidates.

=== Bevan-Baker era (2012–2023) ===
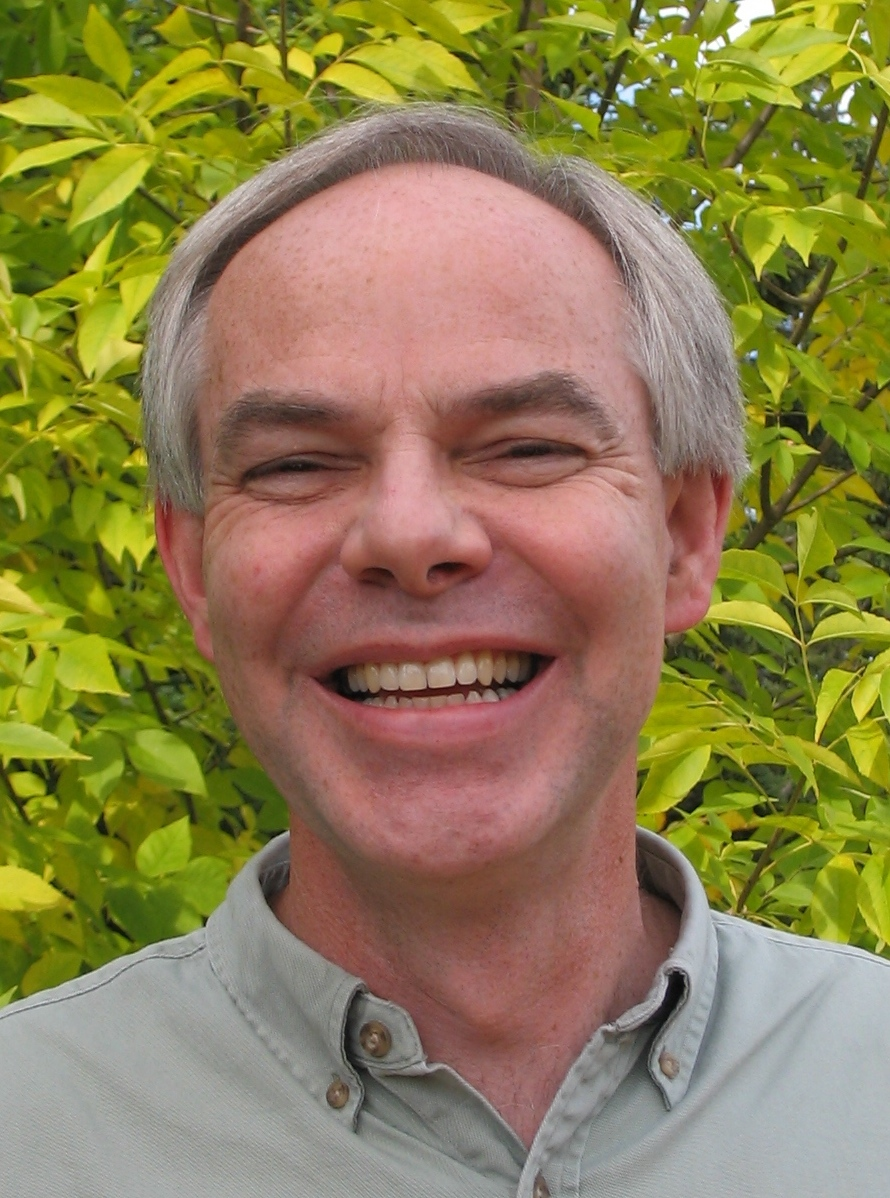
Peter Bevan-Baker, party leader from 2012 to 2023 and its first MLA.

Sharon Labchuk resigned the leadership of the Green Party on July 12, 2012. She was succeeded by Peter Bevan-Baker on November 3, 2012. The party released its platform for the 2015 election on March 20, 2015. In that election, leader Bevan-Baker was elected in the district of Kellys Cross-Cumberland with 54% of the vote, and won the party's first seat, and only the second seat ever won in the legislature for a third party.

The party secured their second seat in a by-election to fill a vacancy left by retiring Charlottetown-Parkdale MLA Doug Currie on November 27, 2017. This was the first time in Island history that a third party won in a by-election.

Bevan-Baker pursued a strategy of broadening the Green Party's focus so as to place social concerns such as affordable housing at the forefront, rather than its traditional association with environmentalism, in the hopes of appealing to voters and appearing as more than a single-issue party. Heading into the 2019 election, several polls showed the Green Party in the lead, with Bevan-Baker the most-liked party leader; on election day, however, while the party won eight seats to form the official opposition, they did not win the most overall seats as recent polls predicted.

The party was the official opposition from 2019 to 2023, in the 66th General Assembly of Prince Edward Island. Following the 2023 election, Bevan-Baker announced his resignation as leader and was succeeded on an interim basis by Karla Bernard.

In the 2024 Borden-Kinkora provincial by-election, the party president Matt MacFarlane was elected.

=== MacFarlane era (2025–present) ===
Matt MacFarlane became leader of the Green Party of Prince Edward Island on June 7, 2025 after their leadership election.

In the 2026 Cornwall-Meadowbank provincial by-election, Tayte Willows was elected, defeating Liberal leader Robert Mitchell.

== Leadership ==
=== Leaders ===
- Sharon Labchuk, 2005–2012
- Darcie Lanthier, 2012 (interim)
- Peter Bevan-Baker, 2012–2023
- Karla Bernard, 2023–2025 (interim)
- Matt MacFarlane, 2025–present

=== Deputy leaders ===
- Darcie Lanthier, 2012–2015
- Lynne Lund, 2015–2023
- Matt MacFarlane, 2024–2025
- Vacant, 2025–present

=== Current MLAs ===
- Karla Bernard, Charlottetown-Victoria Park
- Peter Bevan-Baker, New Haven-Rocky Point
- Matt MacFarlane, Borden-Kinkora
- Tayte Willows, Cornwall-Meadowbank

== Election results ==
Election	Leader	Candidates	Seats	Seat Change	Votes	%	Change	Place	Position
2007	Sharon Labchuk	18 / 27	0 / 27	Steady	2,482	3.04%	Steady	▲3rd	Extra-parliamentary
2011	Sharon Labchuk	22 / 27	0 / 27	Steady	3,254	4.36%	▲1.32%	3rd	Extra-parliamentary
2015	Peter Bevan-Baker	24 / 27	1 / 27	▲1	8,857	10.81%	▲6.45%	3rd	Third party
2019	Peter Bevan-Baker	27 / 27 (Note: Due to the death of Charlottetown-Hillsborough Park candidate Josh Underhay on April 19, 2019, the election in the district was cancelled. A deferred election was held July 15, 2019.)	8 / 27	▲6 (Note: The party entered the election with 2 seats, having gained one in a by-election on November 27, 2017.)	25,302	30.56%	▲19.75%	▲2nd	Official opposition
2023	Peter Bevan-Baker	25 / 27	2 / 27	▼6	16,134	21.57%	▼8.99%	▼3rd	Third party

== See also ==
- 2012 Green Party of Prince Edward Island leadership election
- Green Party of Canada
- List of Green party leaders in Canada
- List of Green politicians who have held office in Canada
- List of Prince Edward Island general elections
- List of political parties in Prince Edward Island
- Politics of Prince Edward Island
