= New Democratic Party of Prince Edward Island =

Provincial political party in Canada

- Abbreviation: NDP PEI
- Leader: Thomas Burleigh
- President: Ann Braithwaite
- Founded: November 25, 1961
- Headquarters: 81 Prince Street; Charlottetown, Prince Edward Island; C1A 4R3
- Membership (2017): 140
- Ideology: Social democracy
- Political position: Centre-left
- National affiliation: New Democratic Party
- Colours: Orange, Blue
- Seats in Legislature: 0 / 27

Website
- Official website

The New Democratic Party of Prince Edward Island (NDP PEI) is a social democratic political party in Prince Edward Island, Canada. It is a provincial section of the federal New Democratic Party (NDP).

== CCF ==
The NDP's predecessor, the Co-operative Commonwealth Federation (CCF), began in 1936 when a CCF club was founded in the Bedeque region during a visit by CCF MP Ted Garland. But the Island CCF did not run candidates until 1943 when the national party made a concerted effort to rally the party by sending an organizer to recruit several candidates to run in the 1943 provincial election. Later that year, a founding convention was held with York South MP Joseph Noseworthy as guest speaker. Irving Toombs was elected president and Douglas MacFarlane provincial secretary.

The CCF ran candidates on the Island in the 1945 federal election, for the first time federally, and again in a provincial by-election in December. In the 1947 provincial election, the CCF contested 16 seats. The party only contested five seats in the 1951 election, however, due to bad road conditions and high deposits. The CCF's candidate that year in 3rd Prince, Hilda Ramsay, became the first woman ever to run in a PEI provincial election.

While not contesting any further provincial elections, the CCF ran one candidate in PEI in the 1953 federal election, three in the 1957 federal election and one in 1958.

== NDP ==
The NDP PEI was founded at a convention in Charlottetown on November 25, 1961, three months after the founding of the New Democratic Party of Canada. Federal leader Tommy Douglas addressed the meeting and Ian Webster was elected provincial president and Lorne Perry vice president. The NDP went on to stand a full slate of four candidates in PEI during the 1962 federal election and, thereafter, ran full slates on the island during federal elections.

The 1968 federal election saw Charlottetown teacher David Hall in Hillsborough make the party's strongest showing. He was subsequently chosen as the PEI NDP's first provincial leader. The party contested three provincial by-elections in 1972, its first attempt at provincial seats since the CCF days, and received 5.2 per cent of the total vote. Aquinas Ryan, a school principal from Morell in Kings County, led the party into the 1974 provincial general election and got 5.9% of the vote, but due to internal bickering, the party fell in the polls.

=== 1993–2007 ===
In the 1993 election, under the leadership of Larry Duchesne, the party share of the popular vote rose to 5.4%. Dr. Herb Dickieson took over as leader, and changed the name of the party from the PEI NDP, to the "Island New Democrats". In the 1996 election, the party captured 7.8% of the vote, and Dr. Dickieson was elected to the Legislative Assembly of Prince Edward Island for the riding of West Point-Bloomfield. He was the first member of a third party to ever win a seat to the PEI Legislative Assembly. Dr. Dickieson narrowly lost his seat in the 2000 election despite the party's overall popular vote rising to 8.4%.

During the 2003 provincial election, the party lacked funds and were poorly organized. The party lost its base of support, only capturing 3% of the popular vote. Some within the party credit this to the return to the Liberal Party of Prince Edward Island of many voters who left the party following the Liberal provincial government's decision to reduce wages of all public employees by 7.5% in the early 1990s. The budget for the 2003 election was estimated to be around $30,000, compared to nearly $1 million for each of the other parties.

Robichaud resigned as leader on June 23, 2005, for health reasons after battling inoperable lung cancer for two years and died shortly afterward. He was replaced in 2006 by Dean Constable, a theatre stage manager for the Charlottetown Festival.

=== 2007–present ===
The party performed poorly in the 2007 election, finishing behind the Green Party of Prince Edward Island with just 1.96% of the total vote or 3.48% in contested ridings. They finished fourth behind the Liberal, Progressive Conservative and Green parties. Dean Constable announced his resignation as leader on August 26, 2007. The party announced it would appoint an interim leader at or before its annual general meeting in November 2007, and hold a leadership convention in April 2008.

James Rodd took the job of interim leader after Dean Constable's resignation, and was elected leader on a permanent basis on April 4, 2009. He led the party into the 2011 election, where the party ran 14 candidates and was soundly defeated with 3.16% of the total vote or 5.84% in contested ridings. On February 8, 2012, Rodd announced that he would resign as leader.

On October 13, 2012, the NDP elected Michael Redmond as the new leader by a vote of 152 to 28 against party activist Trevor Leclerc. Under Redmond's leadership, in March 2013 the party placed second in a provincial public opinion poll, ahead of the Prince Edward Island Progressive Conservative Party, for the first time in its history. The party ran a full slate of candidates (27), but was again shut out of the legislature when it failed to win a seat in the 2015 election. Redmond resigned as leader of the party on December 6, 2017.

There was a leadership convention on April 7, 2018 that elected Joe Byrne as the new leader. Byrne resigned as leader on September 1, 2020.

Michelle Neill was confirmed party leader on April 23, 2022. She was a candidate in the 2025 Brackley-Hunter River provincial by-election, garnering under 3% of the vote. In August 2025, Neill announced her decision to resign as party leader, effective October 25. The party leadership remained vacant until the party convention in February 2026. On February 7, 2026, Thomas Burleigh was elected leader as the sole candidate.

== Leaders ==
- David Hall, 1972
- Aquinas Ryan, 1972–1979
- Doreen Sark, 1979–1981 (interim)
- Douglas Murray, 1981–1982
- David Burke, 1982–1983 (interim)
- Jim Mayne, 1983–1989
- Dolores Crane, 1989–1991 (interim)
- Larry Duchesne, 1991–1995
- Herb Dickieson, 1995–2002
- Gary Robichaud, 2002–2005
- Vacant, 2005–2006
- Dean Constable, 2006–2007
- James Rodd, 2007–2009 (interim), 2009–2012
- Michael Redmond, 2012–2017
- Vacant, 2017–2018
- Joe Byrne, 2018–2020
- Vacant, 2020–2022
- Michelle Neill, 2022–2025
- Vacant, 2025–2026
- Thomas Burleigh, 2026–present

== Election results ==
=== Legislative Assembly ===
Election	Leader	Votes	%	Seats	+/−	Position	Status
1974	Aquinas Ryan	6,786	5.90	0 / 32	Steady	▲3rd	No seats
1978	Aquinas Ryan	1,173	0.93	0 / 32	Steady	3rd	No seats
1979	Doreen Sark	1,655	1.29	0 / 32	Steady	3rd	No seats
1982	David Burke	629	0.47	0 / 32	Steady	3rd	No seats
1986	Jim Mayne	5,965	3.99	0 / 32	Steady	3rd	No seats
1989	Jim Mayne	4,902	3.46	0 / 32	Steady	3rd	No seats
1993	Larry Duchesne	7,819	5.36	0 / 32	Steady	3rd	No seats
1996	Herb Dickieson	6,283	7.85	1 / 27	▲1	3rd	Third party
2000	Herb Dickieson	6,670	8.39	0 / 27	▼1	3rd	No seats
2003	Gary Robichaud	2,460	3.06	0 / 27	Steady	3rd	No seats
2007	Dean Constable	1,597	1.96	0 / 27	Steady	▼4th	No seats
2011	James Rodd	2,355	3.16	0 / 27	Steady	4th	No seats
2015	Michael Redmond	8,997	10.97	0 / 27	Steady	4th	No seats
2019	Joe Byrne	2,454	2.96	0 / 27	Steady	4th	No seats
2023	Michelle Neill	3,359	4.49	0 / 27	Steady	4th	No seats

== NDP Members of the PEI Legislative Assembly ==
There are currently no New Democrats in the Legislative Assembly of Prince Edward Island. In the past, only one individual has been elected as a New Democrat:

- Dr. Herb Dickieson, MLA for West Point-Bloomfield 1996–2000, also Leader of the PEI NDP 1995–2002

== See also ==
- List of Prince Edward Island political parties
