= 64th General Assembly of Prince Edward Island =

2011–2015 Canadian legislative session

- Majority parliament

Parliament leaders
- Premier: Wade MacLauchlan
- Leader of the Opposition: Jamie Fox

Party caucuses
- Government: Liberal Party
- Opposition: Progressive Conservative Party

Legislative Assembly
- Speaker of the Assembly: Carolyn Bertram
- Members: 27 MLA seats

Sovereign
- Monarch: Elizabeth II; 6 February 1952 – 8 September 2022
- Lieutenant governor: Frank Lewis; 11 September 2011 – 20 October 2017
← 63rd	→ 65th

The 64th General Assembly of Prince Edward Island is the 64th sitting of the Legislative Assembly of Prince Edward Island and the 38th since confederation in 1873. The assembly was elected on October 3, 2011 with a landslide re-election for Robert Ghiz and the Liberals. Ghiz resigned as premier on February 23, 2015 and was succeeded by Wade MacLauchlan, who wasn't a member of the 64th General Assembly.

== Members ==
The Speaker of the Legislative Assembly (Carolyn Bertram) is designated by a dagger.

Name	Party	Riding	First elected / previously elected
Pat Murphy	Liberal	Alberton-Roseville	2007
Charlie McGeoghegan	Liberal	Belfast-Murray River	2007
George Webster	Liberal	Borden-Kinkora	2007
Robert Ghiz^{d}	Liberal	Charlottetown-Brighton	2003
Vacant	None	Charlottetown-Brighton	2003
Kathleen Casey	Liberal	Charlottetown-Lewis Point	2007
Doug Currie	Liberal	Charlottetown-Parkdale	2007
Robert Mitchell	Liberal	Charlottetown-Sherwood	2007
Richard Brown	Liberal	Charlottetown-Victoria Park	1997, 2003
Ron MacKinley	Liberal	Cornwall-Meadowbank	1985
Sonny Gallant	Liberal	Evangeline-Miscouche	2007
Steven Myers	Progressive Conservative	Georgetown-St. Peters	2011
Valerie Docherty	Liberal	Kellys Cross-Cumberland	2007
Wes Sheridan^{e}	Liberal	Kensington-Malpeque	2007
Vacant	None	Kensington-Malpeque	2007
Allen Roach	Liberal	Montague-Kilmuir	2011
Olive Crane^{b}	Progressive Conservative	Morell-Mermaid	2006
Olive Crane^{b}	Independent	Morell-Mermaid	2006
Robert Henderson	Liberal	O'Leary-Inverness	2007
Carolyn Bertram†	Liberal	Rustico-Emerald	2003
Colin LaVie	Progressive Conservative	Souris-Elmira	2011
James Aylward	Progressive Conservative	Stratford-Kinlock	2011
Gerard Greenan	Liberal	Summerside-St. Eleanors	2007
Janice Sherry	Liberal	Summerside-Wilmot	2007
Hal Perry^{a}	Progressive Conservative	Tignish-Palmer Road	2011
Hal Perry^{a}	Liberal	Tignish-Palmer Road	2011
Buck Watts	Liberal	Tracadie-Hillsborough Park	2007
Paula Biggar	Liberal	Tyne Valley-Linkletter	2007
Alan McIsaac	Liberal	Vernon River-Stratford	2007
Bush Dumville	Liberal	West Royalty-Springvale	2007
Robert Vessey^{c}	Liberal	York-Oyster Bed	2007
Vacant	None	York-Oyster Bed	2007

- ^a Changed Affiliation on October 3, 2013
- ^b Expelled from Caucus on October 4, 2013
- ^c Resigned as an MLA on February 23, 2015
- ^d Resigned as an MLA on February 24, 2015
- ^e Resigned as an MLA on February 23, 2015

== Party membership ==
Number of members per party by date	2011	2013		2015	
Number of members per party by date	Oct 3	Oct 3	Oct 4	Feb 23	Feb 24
Liberal	22	23		21	20
Progressive Conservative	5	4	3		
Independent	0		1		
Total members	27			25	24
Vacant	0			2	3
Government Majority	17	19		17	16

=== Membership changes ===
Membership changes in the 64th Assembly
Date	Name	District	Party	Reason
October 3, 2011	See List of Members			Election day of the 2011 Prince Edward Island general election
October 3, 2013	Hal Perry	Tignish-Palmer Road	Liberal	Changed affiliation from Progressive Conservative to Liberal.
October 4, 2013	Olive Crane	Morell-Mermaid	Independent	Expelled from Progressive Conservative caucus
February 23, 2015	Robert Vessey	York-Oyster Bed	Liberal	Vacated seat
February 23, 2015	Wes Sheridan	Kensington-Malpeque	Liberal	Vacated seat
February 24, 2015	Robert Ghiz	Charlottetown-Brighton	Liberal	Vacated seat

== See also ==
- List of Prince Edward Island General Assemblies
