= 65th General Assembly of Prince Edward Island =

2015–2019 Canadian legislative session

- Majority parliament

Parliament leaders
- Premier: Wade MacLauchlan
- Leader of the Opposition: Jamie Fox (2015–17); James Aylward (2017–19)

Party caucuses
- Government: Liberal Party
- Opposition: Progressive Conservative Party
- Recognized: Green Party

Legislative Assembly
- Speaker of the Assembly: Buck Watts
- Members: 27 MLA seats

Sovereign
- Monarch: Elizabeth II; 6 February 1952 – 8 September 2022
- Lieutenant governor: Antoinette Perry; 20 October 2017 – present
← 64th	→ 66th

The 65th General Assembly of Prince Edward Island is the 65th sitting of the Legislative Assembly of Prince Edward Island and the 39th since confederation in 1873. The assembly was elected on May 4, 2015 with a re-election for Premier Wade MacLauchlan and the Liberals.

== Members ==
Cabinet ministers are in bold, party leaders are in italic, and the Speaker of the Legislative Assembly is designated by a dagger (†).

Name	Party	Riding	First elected / previously elected
**Pat Murphy**	Liberal	Alberton-Roseville	2007
Darlene Compton	Progressive Conservative	Belfast-Murray River	2015
Jamie Fox	Progressive Conservative	Borden-Kinkora	2015
**Jordan Brown**	Liberal	Charlottetown-Brighton	2015
Kathleen Casey	Liberal	Charlottetown-Lewis Point	2007
Doug Currie (Note: Resigned as an MLA on October 19, 2017.)	Liberal	Charlottetown-Parkdale	2007
Hannah Bell (Note: Elected in a by-election on November 27, 2017.) (2017)	Green	Charlottetown-Parkdale	2017
**Robert Mitchell**	Liberal	Charlottetown-Sherwood	2007
**Richard Brown**	Liberal	Charlottetown-Victoria Park	1997, 2003
**Heath MacDonald**	Liberal	Cornwall-Meadowbank	2015
**Sonny Gallant**	Liberal	Evangeline-Miscouche	2007
Steven Myers	Progressive Conservative	Georgetown-St. Peters	2011
Peter Bevan-Baker	Green	Kellys Cross-Cumberland	2015
Matthew MacKay	Progressive Conservative	Kensington-Malpeque	2015
Allen Roach	Liberal	Montague-Kilmuir	2011
Sidney MacEwen	Progressive Conservative	Morell-Mermaid	2015
**Robert Henderson**	Liberal	O'Leary-Inverness	2007
Brad Trivers	Progressive Conservative	Rustico-Emerald	2015
Colin LaVie	Progressive Conservative	Souris-Elmira	2011
James Aylward	Progressive Conservative	Stratford-Kinlock	2011
**Tina Mundy**	Liberal	Summerside-St. Eleanors	2015
Janice Sherry (Note: Resigned as an MLA on August 1, 2016.)	Liberal	Summerside-Wilmot	2007
**Chris Palmer** (Note: Elected in a by-election on October 17, 2016.) (2016)	Liberal	Summerside-Wilmot	2016
Hal Perry	Liberal	Tignish-Palmer Road	2011 (Note: First elected as a Progressive Conservative)
Buck Watts†	Liberal	Tracadie-Hillsborough Park	2007
**Paula Biggar**	Liberal	Tyne Valley-Linkletter	2007
Alan McIsaac	Liberal	Vernon River-Stratford	2007
Bush Dumville (Note: Resigned from Liberal caucus on January 31, 2018.)	Liberal	West Royalty-Springvale	2007
Bush Dumville	Independent	West Royalty-Springvale	2007
**Wade MacLauchlan**	Liberal	York-Oyster Bed	2015

== Party membership ==
Number of members per party by date	2015	2016		2017		2018
Number of members per party by date	May 4	Aug 1	Oct 17	Oct 19	Nov 27	Jan 31
Liberal	18	17	18	17		16
Progressive Conservative	8					
Green	1				2	
Independent	0					1
Total members	27	26	27	26	27	
Vacant	0	1	0	1	0	
Government Majority	9	8	9	8	7	5

=== Membership changes ===
Membership changes in the 65th Assembly
Date	Name	District	Party	Reason
May 4, 2015	See List of Members			Election day of the 2015 Prince Edward Island general election
August 1, 2016	Janice Sherry	Summerside-Wilmot	Liberal	Vacated seat
October 17, 2016	Chris Palmer	Summerside-Wilmot	Liberal	Elected in a by-election
October 19, 2017	Doug Currie	Charlottetown-Parkdale	Liberal	Vacated seat
November 27, 2017	Hannah Bell	Charlottetown-Parkdale	Green	Elected in a by-election
January 31, 2018	Bush Dumville	West Royalty-Springvale	Independent	Resigned from Liberal caucus

== See also ==
- List of Prince Edward Island General Assemblies
