= 63rd General Assembly of Prince Edward Island =

2007–2011 Canadian legislative session

The 63rd General Assembly of Prince Edward Island is the 63rd sitting of the Legislative Assembly of Prince Edward Island and the 37th since confederation in 1873. The assembly was elected on May 28, 2007, with the result of a change of government and a landslide for Robert Ghiz and the Liberals.

== Members ==
The Speaker of the Legislative Assembly (Kathleen Casey) is designated by a dagger.

Member	Party	Electoral district	First elected / previously elected
Pat Murphy	Liberal	Alberton-Roseville	2007
Pat Binns^{1}	Progressive Conservative	Belfast-Murray River	1978, (Note: 4th Kings (Assemblyman)) 1996
Charlie McGeoghegan (2007)	Liberal	Belfast-Murray River	2007
George Webster	Liberal	Borden-Kinkora	2007
Robert Ghiz	Liberal	Charlottetown-Brighton	2003
Kathleen Casey†	Liberal	Charlottetown-Lewis Point	2007
Doug Currie	Liberal	Charlottetown-Parkdale	2007
Robert Mitchell	Liberal	Charlottetown-Sherwood	2007
Richard Brown	Liberal	Charlottetown-Victoria Park	1997, 2003
Ron MacKinley	Liberal	Cornwall-Meadowbank	1985
Sonny Gallant	Liberal	Evangeline-Miscouche	2007
Michael Currie^{2}	Progressive Conservative	Georgetown-St. Peters	1996
Vacant	None	Georgetown-St. Peters	1996
Valerie Docherty	Liberal	Kellys Cross-Cumberland	2007
Wes Sheridan	Liberal	Kensington-Malpeque	2007
Jim Bagnall	Progressive Conservative	Montague-Kilmuir	1996
Olive Crane	Progressive Conservative	Morell-Mermaid	2006
Robert Henderson	Liberal	O'Leary-Inverness	2007
Carolyn Bertram	Liberal	Rustico-Emerald	2003
Allan Campbell	Liberal	Souris-Elmira	2007
Cynthia Dunsford	Liberal	Stratford-Kinlock	2007
Gerard Greenan	Liberal	Summerside-St. Eleanors	2007
Janice Sherry	Liberal	Summerside-Wilmot	2007
Neil LeClair	Liberal	Tignish-Palmer Road	2007
Buck Watts	Liberal	Tracadie-Hillsborough Park	2007
Paula Biggar	Liberal	Tyne Valley-Linkletter	2007
Alan McIsaac	Liberal	Vernon River-Stratford	2007
Bush Dumville	Liberal	West Royalty-Springvale	2007
Robert Vessey	Liberal	York-Oyster Bed	2007

- ^1 resigned August 30, 2007.
- ^2 resigned March 28, 2011.

== Party standings ==
Number of members per party by date	2007			2011
Number of members per party by date	May 28	Aug 31	Oct 15	Mar 28
Liberal	23		24	
Progressive Conservative	4	3		2
Total members	27	26	27	26
Vacant	0	1	0	1
Government Majority	19	20	21	22

=== Membership changes ===
Membership changes in the 63rd Assembly
Date	Name	District	Party	Reason
May 28, 2007	See List of Members			Election day of the 2007 Prince Edward Island general election
August 30, 2007	Pat Binns	Belfast-Murray River	Progressive Conservative	Vacated seat
October 15, 2007	Charlie McGeoghegan	Belfast-Murray River	Liberal	Elected in a by-election
March 28, 2011	Michael Currie	Georgetown-St. Peters	Progressive Conservative	Vacated seat to run in the 2011 Canadian federal election

== See also ==
- List of Prince Edward Island General Assemblies
