= 2015 Prince Edward Island general election =

Canadian provincial election

- May 4, 2015

All 27 seats in the Legislative Assembly of Prince Edward Island 14 seats needed for a majority
- Opinion polls
- Turnout: 82.10%▲
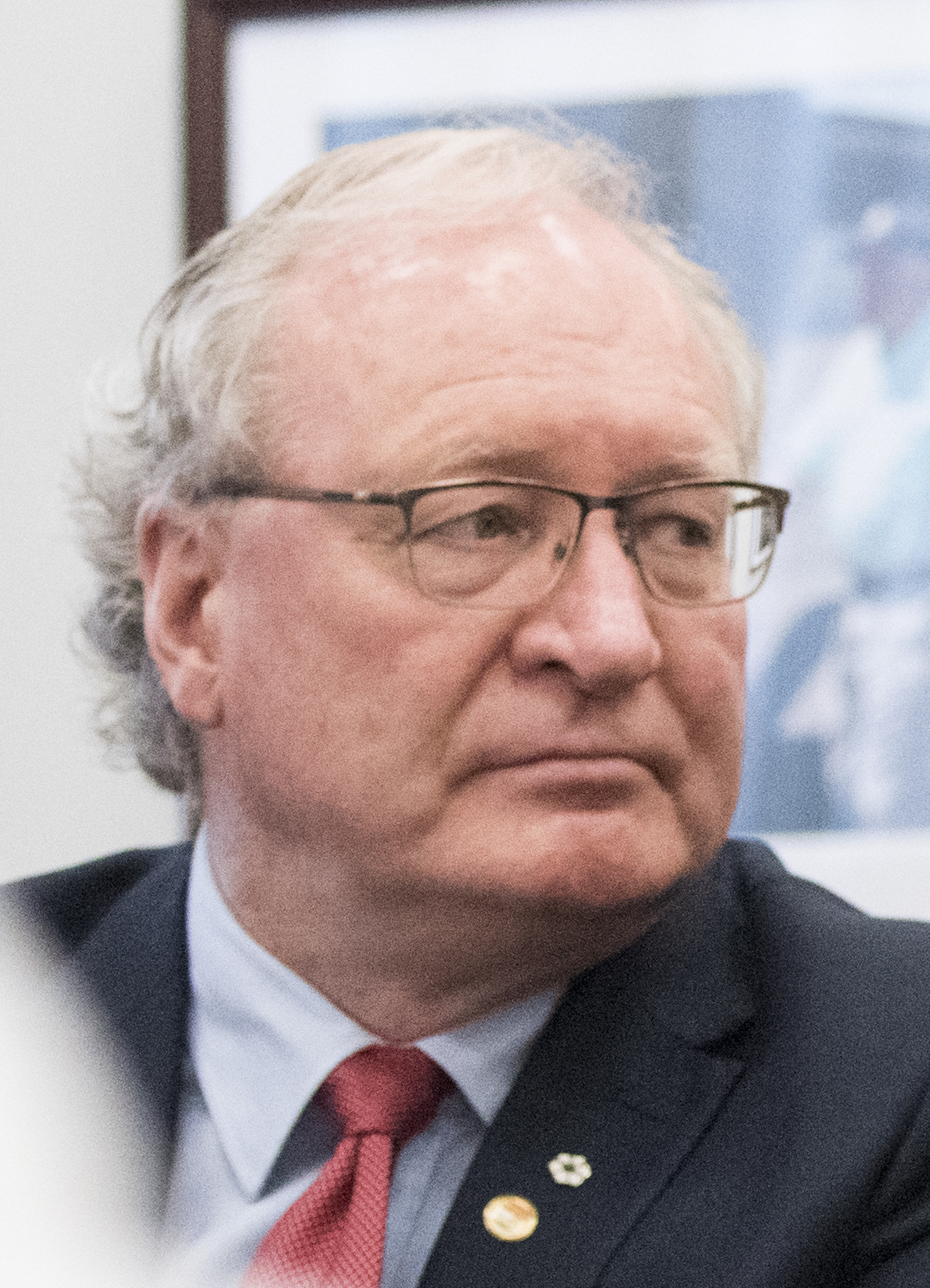

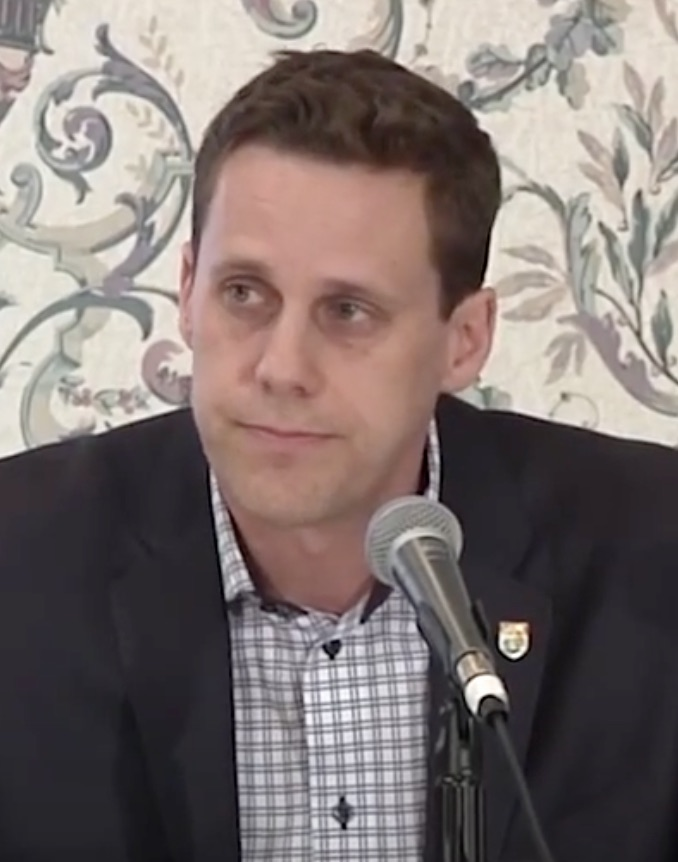

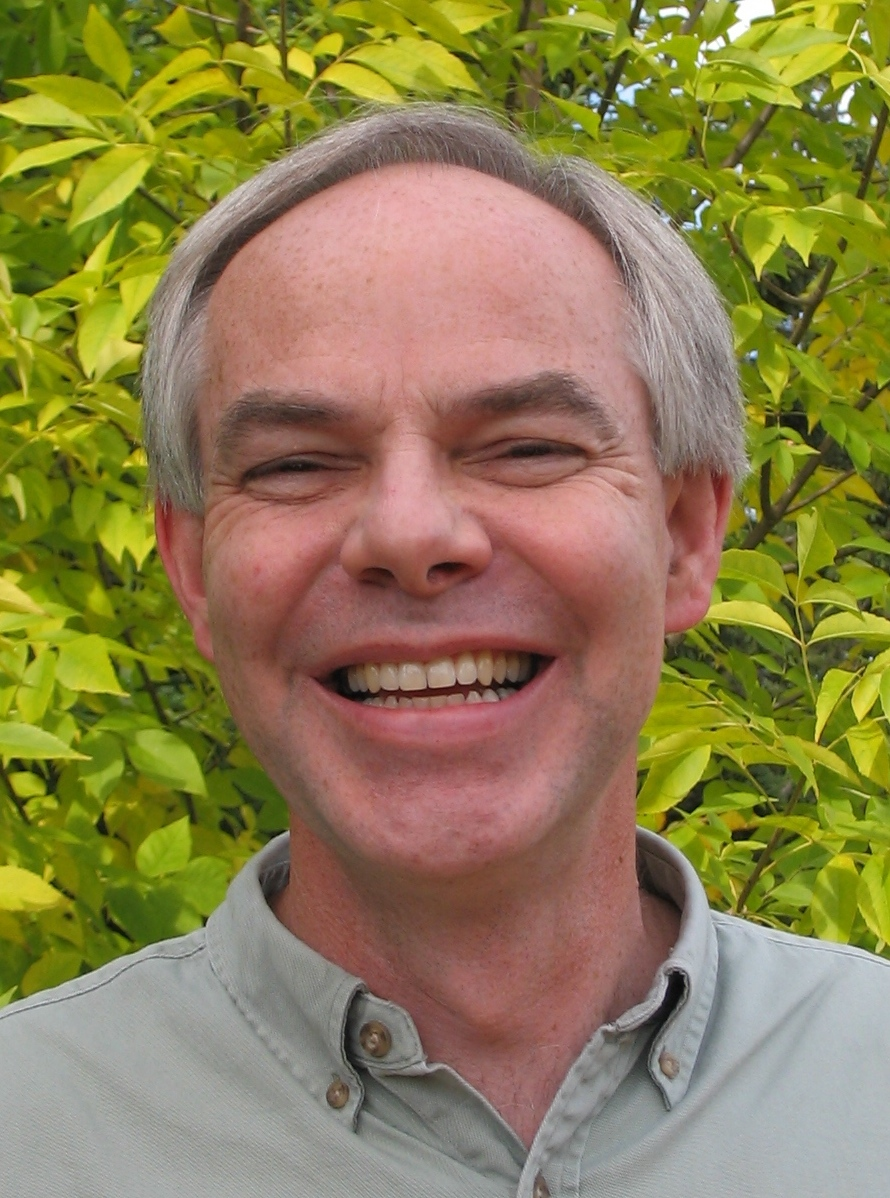

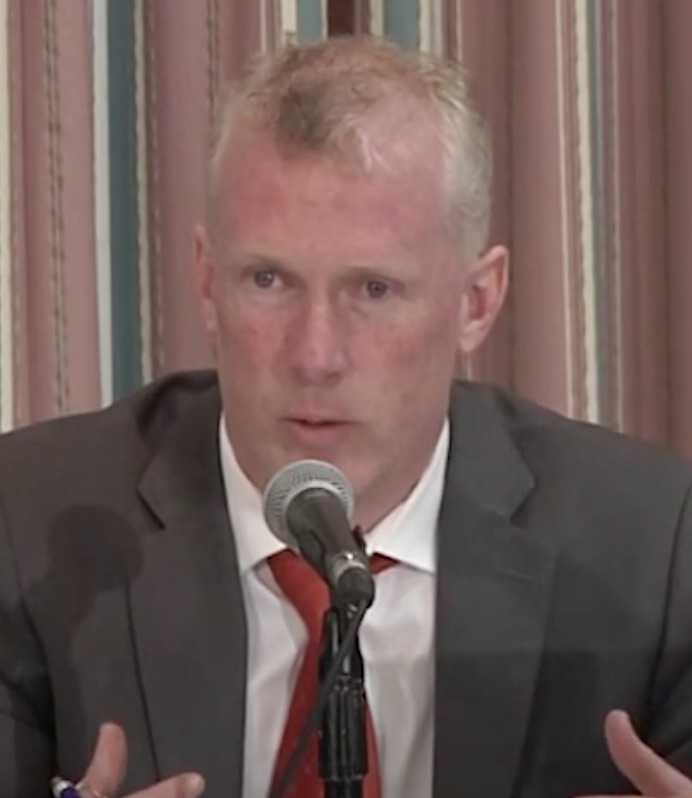
	First party	Second party
Leader	Wade MacLauchlan	Rob Lantz
Party	Liberal	Progressive Conservative
Leader since	February 21, 2015	February 28, 2015
Leader's seat	York-Oyster Bed	Ran in Charlottetown-Brighton (lost)
Last election	22 seats, 51.39%	5 seats, 40.18%
Seats before	20	3
Seats won	18	8
Seat change	▼2	▲5
Popular vote	33,481	30,663
Percentage	40.83%	37.39%
Swing	▼10.56pp	▼2.79pp
	Third party	Fourth party
Leader	Peter Bevan-Baker	Michael Redmond
Party	Green	New Democratic
Leader since	November 3, 2012	October 13, 2012
Leader's seat	Kellys Cross-Cumberland	Ran in Montague-Kilmuir (lost)
Last election	0 seats, 4.36%	0 seats, 3.16%
Seats before	0	0
Seats won	1	0
Seat change	▲1	Steady
Popular vote	8,857	8,997
Percentage	10.81%	10.97%
Swing	▲6.45pp	▲7.81pp
- Popular vote by riding. As this is an FPTP election, seat totals are not determined by popular vote, but instead via plurality results by each riding.
Premier before election
Wade MacLauchlan
Liberal
Premier after election
Wade MacLauchlan
Liberal

The 2015 Prince Edward Island general election was held on May 4, 2015, to elect members of the 65th General Assembly of Prince Edward Island. Under amendments passed by the Legislative Assembly of Prince Edward Island in 2008, Prince Edward Island elections are usually held on the first Monday of October in the fourth calendar year, unless it is dissolved earlier by the lieutenant governor of Prince Edward Island due to a motion of no confidence, or at the request of the premier. The current government had hinted that an election would be held "before Mother's Day" 2015, and such a dissolution would avoid any conflicts with the next federal election, expected to be held in October 2015.

The governing Liberals were elected to a third consecutive majority government under Premier Wade MacLauchlan. At the same time, the Progressive Conservatives made slight gains despite party leader Rob Lantz failing to win the election in Charlottetown-Brighton. The Green Party, meanwhile, won its first seat in the legislature, with leader Peter Bevan-Baker elected in Kellys 'Cross-Cumberland. The New Democratic Party was shut out.

== Results ==
↓
18	8	1
Liberal	Progressive Conservative	GP

Results of the election by polling division

Summary of the Legislative Assembly of Prince Edward Island election results
Party	Party leader	Candidates	Seats				Popular vote		
Party	Party leader	Candidates	2011	Dissol.	2015	Change	#	%	Change
Liberal	Wade MacLauchlan	27	22	20	18	−4	33,481	40.83%	−10.55%
Progressive Conservative	Rob Lantz	27	5	3	8	+3	30,663	37.39%	−2.77%
Green	Peter Bevan-Baker	24	0	0	1	+1	8,857	10.81%	+6.45%
New Democratic	Michael Redmond	27	0	0	0		8,997	10.97%	+7.81%
Independent			0	1	0				
Vacant				3	-	-			
Total		105	27	27	27		81,998		

Popular vote
Liberal	40.83%
PC	37.39%
New Democratic	10.97%
Green	10.81%

Seats summary
Liberal	66.67%
PC	29.63%
Green	3.70%

=== Synopsis of results ===
2015 PEI general election - synopsis of riding results (Note: "Section 4 - Summary of Election Results". Report of the Chief Electoral Officer for the Provincial General Election - May 4, 2015 (PDF). Elections Prince Edward Island. 2015. pp. 37, 40–93.)
Riding	#	Federal Riding	2011	Winning party					Turnout (Note: including spoilt ballots)	Votes (Note: minor political parties receiving less than 1% of the national popular vote are aggregated under "Other"; independent candidates are aggregated separately)				
Riding	#	Federal Riding	2011	Party	Votes	Share	Margin #	Margin %	Turnout	Lib	PC	Green	NDP	Total
Alberton-Roseville	26	EGM	Lib	Lib	1,569	53.7%	403	13.8%	85.6%	1,569	1,166	–	188	2,923
Belfast-Murray River	4	CAR	Lib	PC	1,203	45.1%	108	4.0%	85.5%	1,095	1,203	152	216	2,666
Borden-Kinkora	19	MPQ	Lib	PC	1,597	47.1%	443	13.1%	82.7%	1,154	1,597	511	126	3,388
Charlottetown-Brighton (Note: also an open seat)	13	CHA	Lib	Lib	1,054	39.0%	22	0.8%	85.6%	1,054	1,032	352	265	2,703
Charlottetown-Lewis Point	14	CHA	Lib	Lib	1,040	34.3%	109	3.6%	79.9%	1,040	821	244	931	3,036
Charlottetown-Parkdale	11	CHA	Lib	Lib	1,166	43.7%	467	17.5%	79.9%	1,166	699	511	292	2,668
Charlottetown-Sherwood	10	CHA	Lib	Lib	1,425	45.8%	394	12.7%	81.8%	1,425	1,031	295	360	3,111
Charlottetown-Victoria Park	12	CHA	Lib	Lib	955	39.4%	289	11.9%	80.7%	955	666	456	348	2,425
Cornwall-Meadowbank	16	MPQ	Lib	Lib	1,444	46.3%	388	12.5%	81.5%	1,444	1,056	377	243	3,120
Evangeline-Miscouche	24	EGM	Lib	Lib	1,419	62.6%	833	25.8%	85.9%	1,419	586	125	138	2,268
Georgetown-St. Peters	2	CAR	PC	PC	1,448	48.0%	278	9.2%	84.8%	1,170	1,448	145	256	3,019
Kellys Cross-Cumberland	17	MPQ	Lib	Grn	2,077	54.8%	1,031	27.2%	85.2%	1,046	609	2,077	58	3,790
Kensington-Malpeque	20	MPQ	Lib	PC	1,984	54.3%	951	26.0%	82.3%	1,033	1,984	374	264	3,655
Montague-Kilmuir	3	CAR	Lib	Lib	1,060	41.8%	275	10.8%	82.5%	1,060	785	106	585	2,536
Morell-Mermaid	7	CAR	PC	PC	1,501	50.0%	387	12.9%	82.8%	1,114	1,501	177	211	3,004
O'Leary-Inverness	25	EGM	Lib	Lib	1,310	48.8%	247	8.9%	81.2%	1,310	1,063	–	311	2,684
Rustico-Emerald	18	MPQ	Lib	PC	1,585	47.2%	433	12.9%	85.7%	1,152	1,585	325	294	3,356
Souris-Elmira	1	CAR	PC	PC	1,179	44.4%	228	8.6%	86.2%	951	1,179	–	528	2,658
Stratford-Kinlock	6	CAR	PC	PC	2,155	50.3%	702	16.4%	81.4%	1,453	2,155	330	350	4,288
Summerside-St. Eleanors	22	EGM	Lib	Lib	1,246	41.2%	148	4.9%	75.6%	1,246	1,098	321	358	3,023
Summerside-Wilmot	21	EGM	Lib	Lib	1,135	39.4%	30	1.0%	74.8%	1,135	1,105	285	353	2,878
Tignish-Palmer Road	27	EGM	PC	Lib	1,486	58.2%	668	26.1%	87.6%	1,486	818	167	81	2,552
Tracadie-Hillsborough Park	8	CHA	Lib	Lib	1,354	45.7%	528	17.9%	76.6%	1,354	826	237	549	2,966
Tyne Valley-Linkletter	23	EGM	Lib	Lib	1,147	43.0%	337	12.7%	77.8%	1,147	810	240	473	2,670
Vernon River-Stratford	5	CAR	Lib	Lib	1,173	41.3%	–	–	83.3%	1,173	1,173	234	258	2,838
West Royalty-Springvale	15	CHA	Lib	Lib	1,389	37.6%	59	1.6%	82.1%	1,389	1,330	462	516	3,697
York-Oyster Bed	9	MPQ	Lib	Lib	1,938	47.7%	600	14.8%	81.1%	1,938	1,338	347	442	4,065

= results as certified in a judicial recount
= open seat
= turnout is above provincial average
= incumbent re-elected in same riding
= incumbent changed allegiance
= other incumbent renominated
= tied for first place - settled by coin toss

Resulting composition of the 65th General Assembly of Prince Edward Island
Source		Party			
Source		Lib	PC	Grn	Total
Seats retained	Incumbents returned	12	3		15
Seats retained	Incumbent returned on coin toss	1			1
Seats retained	Open seats held	4	1		5
Seats changing hands	Incumbents defeated		1	1	2
Seats changing hands	Open seats gained		3		3
Seats changing hands	Incumbent changing affiliation	1			1
Total		18	8	1	27

=== Results by region ===
Regional summary of results (2015)
Region	Seats won			Vote share (%)				Change (pp)				
Region	Lib	PC	Grn	Lib	PC	Grn	NDP	Lib	PC	Grn	NDP	Major swing
Cardigan	2	5	–	38.16	44.95	5.45	11.44	-4.38	-4.73	+2.13	+9.38	→ 6.88
Malpeque	2	3	1	36.33	38.21	18.76	6.69	-16.54	+0.11	+13.95	+2.92	→ 15.25
Charlottetown	7	–	–	40.69	31.08	12.41	15.82	-13.62	-0.08	+5.01	+8.85	→ 11.24
Egmont	7	–	–	49.00	34.97	6.01	10.01	-8.01	-3.92	+3.27	+9.18	→ 8.60
Total	18	8	1	40.83	37.39	10.81	10.98	-10.55	-2.77	+6.45	+7.82	→ 9.19

== Timeline ==
=== 2011 ===
- October 3: The Prince Edward Island Liberal Party under Robert Ghiz is re-elected with a majority government in the 64th Prince Edward Island general election.

=== 2012 ===
- October 13: The New Democratic Party elects Michael Redmond as party leader.
- November 3: The Green Party elects Peter Bevan-Baker as party leader
- December 5: Progressive Conservative leader Olive Crane announces her intention to resign as party leader in January 2013 after party members narrowly vote against having a leadership review. Crane further announces that she will stay on as Leader of the Opposition.

=== 2013 ===
- January 30: Olive Crane resigns as Leader of the Opposition. The Progressive Conservative caucus names Tignish-Palmer Road MLA Hal Perry, a candidate for the interim leadership, as Leader of the Opposition.
- January 31: Olive Crane resigns as Progressive Conservative leader. Georgetown-St. Peters MLA Steven Myers is elected interim PC leader over Leader of the Opposition and Tignish-Palmer Road MLA Hal Perry. Perry initially announces that he will remain Leader of the Opposition, despite Myers' urging that the party leader should hold both positions.
- February 11: Tignish-Palmer Road MLA Hal Perry steps down as Leader of the Opposition, citing internal divisions within the Progressive Conservative Party. Interim PC leader and Georgetown-St. Peters MLA Steven Myers is subsequently named Leader of the Opposition.
- October 3: In what is believed to be the first instance of a sitting MLA crossing the floor, Tignish-Palmer Road MLA Hal Perry leaves the Progressive Conservatives to join the Liberals, citing his concerns with the federal Conservative governments changes to employment insurance.
- October 4: Morell-Mermaid MLA and former Progressive Conservative leader Olive Crane is kicked out of the party. Crane subsequently announces she will sit as an independent.

=== 2014 ===
- November 13: Robert Ghiz announces he will be resigning as Premier in early 2015 as soon as the Prince Edward Island Liberal Party elects a new leader.

=== 2015 ===
- February 21: The Prince Edward Island Liberal Party held its leadership election. As the sole candidate nominated, Wade MacLauchlan was acclaimed the new leader and incoming premier.
- February 23: Robert Ghiz resigns as Premier. Wade MacLauchlan is appointed and sworn in as the new Premier. Later that day, Ghiz, Wes Sheridan, and Robert Vessey resign as MLAs, triggering potential by-elections in their former seats (Charlottetown-Brighton, Kensington-Malpeque, and York-Oyster Bed, respectively).
- February 28: At the party's leadership election, Rob Lantz is elected leader of the Progressive Conservative Party of Prince Edward Island.
- April 6: After being nominated as the Liberal candidate for York-Oyster Bed, Premier Wade MacLauchlan dropped the writ, calling for an election on May 4, 2015.
- April 10: The Island Party drops out of the campaign, due to not having enough candidates
- April 27: Party leaders' first televised debate, held in Summerside.
- April 30: A second televised debate was held for the party leaders, in Charlottetown.
- May 4: Election results - The Liberals win a third consecutive majority government, with a reduced number of 18 seats. The Progressive Conservatives remain as the official opposition, with an increase to 8 seats. The Greens make Prince Edward Island political history, winning their first seat.

== Opinion polls ==
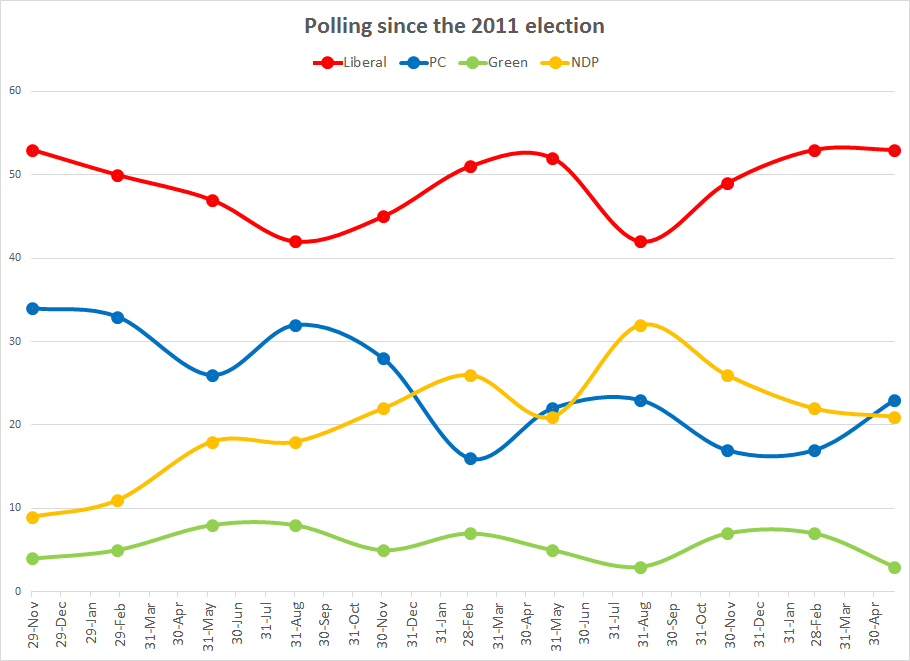
Voting intentions since the 2011 election.

Polling Firm	Last date of polling	Link	Liberal	PC	Green	NDP	Island	Other
Corporate Research Associates	April 23, 2015	HTML	44	35	6	15		
Abingdon Research	April 20, 2015	PDF	43	27	12	18		
Corporate Research Associates	February 28, 2015	PDF	58	26	4	12		0
Corporate Research Associates	November 25, 2014	PDF	50	23	11	15	0	0
Corporate Research Associates	September 1, 2014	PDF	48	28	7	16	0	0
Corporate Research Associates	May 22, 2014	PDF	53	23	3	21	0	0
Corporate Research Associates	February 27, 2014	PDF	53	17	7	22	0	1
Corporate Research Associates	November 27, 2013	PDF	49	17	7	26	0	1
Corporate Research Associates	August 28, 2013	PDF	42	23	3	32	0	0
Corporate Research Associates	May 28, 2013	PDF	52	22	5	21	0	1
Corporate Research Associates	March 2, 2013	PDF	51	16	7	26	0	0
Corporate Research Associates	December 1, 2012	PDF	45	28	5	22	0	0
Corporate Research Associates	August 31, 2012	PDF	42	32	8	18	0	0
Corporate Research Associates	June 4, 2012	PDF	47	26	8	18	1	1
Corporate Research Associates	February 26, 2012	PDF	50	33	5	11	0	0
Corporate Research Associates	November 29, 2011	PDF	53	34	4	9	0	0
2011 election	October 3, 2011		51.38	40.16	4.36	3.16	0.91	0.02

== Results ==
- Candidates' names appear as recorded by Elections PEI
- Party leaders' names are in **bold**; cabinet ministers' names are in italics.

=== Cardigan ===
Electoral district	Candidates				Incumbent
Electoral district	Liberal	PC	Green	NDP	Incumbent
4. Belfast-Murray River	Charlie McGeoghegan; 1,095 - 41.1%	Darlene Compton; 1,203 - 45.1%	Jordan MacPhee; 152 - 5.7%	Alan Hicken; 216 - 8.1%	Charlie McGeoghegan
2. Georgetown-St. Peters	Russ Stewart; 1,170 - 38.8%	Steven Myers; 1,448 - 48.0%	Heather Gallant; 145 - 4.8%	Nathan Bushey; 256 - 8.5%	Steven Myers
3. Montague-Kilmuir	Allen Roach; 1,060 - 41.8%	Andrew Daggett; 785 - 31.0%	Jason Furness; 106 - 4.2%	**Mike Redmond**; 585 - 23.1%	Allen Roach
7. Morell-Mermaid	Daniel MacDonald; 1,114 - 37.1%	Sidney MacEwen; 1,501 - 50.0%	Meaghan Lister; 177 - 5.9%	Edith Perry; 211 - 7.0%	Olive Crane†
1. Souris-Elmira	Tommy Kickham; 951 - 35.8%	Colin LaVie; 1,179 - 44.4%		Susan Birt; 528 - 19.9%	Colin LaVie
6. Stratford-Kinlock	David Dunphy; 1,453 - 33.9%	James Aylward; 2,155 - 50.3%	Samantha Saunders; 330 - 7.7%	Chris van Ouwerkerk; 350 - 8.2%	James Aylward
5. Vernon River-Stratford*	Alan McIsaac*; 1,173 - 41.3%	Mary Ellen McInnis*; 1,173 - 41.3%	Nicholas Graveline; 234 - 8.2%	Kathleen Romans; 258 - 9.1%	Alan McIsaac

- This riding vote count resulted in a tie between McIsaac and McInnis. As a result, a coin toss was held, which determined McIsaac, the Liberal candidate, as the winner.

=== Malpeque ===
Electoral district	Candidates				Incumbent
Electoral district	Liberal	PC	Green	NDP	Incumbent
19. Borden-Kinkora	Ramona Roberts; 1,154 - 34.1%	Jamie Fox; 1,597 - 47.1%	Ranald MacFarlane; 511 - 15.1%	Aleida Tweten; 126 - 3.7%	George Webster†
16. Cornwall-Meadowbank	Heath MacDonald; 1,444 - 46.3%	Michael Drake; 1,056 - 33.8%	Rosalyn Abbott; 377 - 12.1%	Jennifer Coughlin; 243 - 7.8%	Ron MacKinley†
17. Kellys Cross-Cumberland	Valerie Docherty; 1,046 - 27.6%	Randy Robar; 609 - 16.1%	**Peter Bevan-Baker**; 2,077 - 54.8%	Jesse Cousins; 58 - 1.5%	Valerie Docherty
20. Kensington-Malpeque	Paul Montgomery; 1,033 - 28.3%	Matthew MacKay; 1,984 - 54.3%	Lynne Lund; 374 - 10.2%	Joseph Larkin; 264 - 7.2%	Vacant
18. Rustico-Emerald	Bertha Campbell; 1,152 - 34.3%	Brad Trivers; 1,585 - 47.2%	Marianne Janowicz; 325 - 9.7%	Leah-Jane Hayward; 294 - 8.8%	Carolyn Bertram†
9. York-Oyster Bed	**Wade MacLauchlan**; 1,938 - 47.7%	Jim "Benson" Carragher; 1,338 - 32.9%	Thane Bernard; 347 - 8.5%	Gordon Gay; 442 - 10.9%	Vacant

=== Charlottetown ===
Electoral district	Candidates				Incumbent
Electoral district	Liberal	PC	Green	NDP	Incumbent
13. Charlottetown-Brighton	Jordan Brown; 1,054 - 39.0%	**Rob Lantz**; 1,032 - 38.2%	Derrick Biso; 352 - 13.0%	Bob MacLean; 265 - 9.8%	Vacant
14. Charlottetown-Lewis Point	Kathleen Casey; 1,040 - 34.3%	Dianne Young; 821 - 27.0%	Doug Millington; 244 - 8.0%	Gord McNeilly; 931 - 30.7%	Kathleen Casey
11. Charlottetown-Parkdale	Doug Currie; 1,166 - 43.7%	Lynn MacLaren; 699 - 26.2%	Becka Viau; 511 - 19.2%	Andrew Watts; 292 - 10.9%	Doug Currie
10. Charlottetown-Sherwood	Robert Mitchell; 1,425 - 45.8%	Mike Gillis; 1,031 - 33.1%	Mitchell Gallant; 295 - 9.5%	Karalee McAskill; 360 - 11.6%	Robert Mitchell
12. Charlottetown-Victoria Park	Richard Brown; 955 - 39.4%	Joey Kitson; 666 - 27.5%	Darcie Lanthier; 456 - 18.8%	Chris Clay; 348 - 14.4%	Richard Brown
8. Tracadie-Hillsborough Park	Buck Watts; 1,354 - 45.7%	Darren Creamer; 826 - 27.8%	Isaac Williams; 237 - 8.0%	Jason Murray; 549 - 18.5%	Buck Watts
15. West Royalty-Springvale	Bush Dumville; 1,389 - 37.6%	Linda Clements; 1,330 - 36.0%	Charles Sanderson; 462 - 12.5%	Peter Meggs; 516 - 14.0%	Bush Dumville

=== Egmont ===
Electoral district	Candidates				Incumbent
Electoral district	Liberal	PC	Green	NDP	Incumbent
26. Alberton-Roseville	Pat Murphy; 1,569 - 53.7%	John Griffin; 1,166 - 39.9%		Orville Lewis; 188 - 6.4%	Pat Murphy
24. Evangeline-Miscouche	Sonny Gallant; 1,419 - 62.6%	Debbie Montgomery; 586 - 25.8%	Jordan Cameron; 125 - 5.5%	Grant Gallant; 138 - 6.1%	Sonny Gallant
25. O'Leary-Inverness	Robert Henderson; 1,310 - 48.8%	Daniel MacDonald; 1,063 - 39.6%		Billy Mackendrick; 311 - 11.6%	Robert Henderson
22. Summerside-St. Eleanors	Tina Mundy; 1,246 - 41.2%	Major Stewart; 1,098 - 36.3%	Caleb Adams; 321 - 10.6%	Olivia Wood; 358 - 11.8%	Gerard Greenan†
21. Summerside-Wilmot	Janice Sherry; 1,135 - 39.4%	Brian Ramsay; 1,105 - 38.4%	Donald MacFadzen-Reid; 285 - 9.9%	Scott Gaudet; 353 - 12.3%	Janice Sherry
27. Tignish-Palmer Road	Hal Perry; 1,486 - 58.2%	Joseph Profit; 818 - 32.1%	Malcolm Pitre; 167 - 6.5%	John A'Hearn; 81 - 3.2%	Hal Perry
23. Tyne Valley-Linkletter	Paula Biggar; 1,147 - 43.0%	Ryan Williams; 810 - 30.3%	Shelagh Young; 240 - 9.0%	Jacqueline Tuplin; 473 - 17.7%	Paula Biggar
