= 2011 Prince Edward Island general election =

Canadian provincial election

- October 3, 2011

27 seats of the Legislative Assembly of Prince Edward Island 14 seats needed for a majority
- Opinion polls
- Turnout: 76.53%
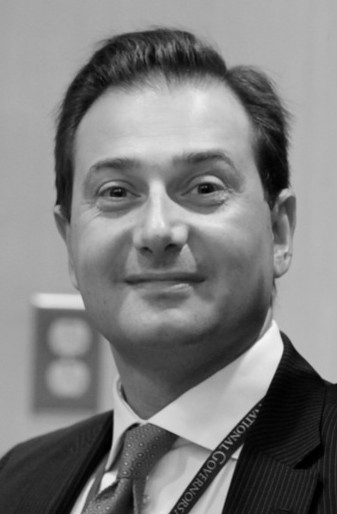
	First party	Second party
		PC
Leader	Robert Ghiz	Olive Crane
Party	Liberal	Progressive Conservative
Leader since	April 5, 2003	October 2, 2010
Leader's seat	Charlottetown-Brighton	Morell-Mermaid
Last election	23 seats, 52.93%	4 seats, 41.35%
Seats before	24	2
Seats won	22	5
Seat change	▼2	▲3
Popular vote	38,315	29,950
Percentage	51.39%	40.18%
Swing	▼1.54%	▼1.17%
- Popular vote by riding. As this is an FPTP election, seat totals are not determined by popular vote, but instead via plurality results by each riding.
Premier before election
Robert Ghiz
Liberal
Premier after election
Robert Ghiz
Liberal

The 2011 Prince Edward Island general election was held on October 3, 2011.

The Liberal government of Premier Robert Ghiz was elected to a second majority government, winning one seat less than they did in 2007. Ghiz himself considered 18 seats to be a marker for a strong majority. He won 22.

Health care was an important issue during the election, especially in rural areas.

The Progressive Conservatives retained their position as Official Opposition, winning five seats. Olive Crane used the issue of the Provincial Nominee Program during the election, as well as issues surrounding immigration and investments that came under investigation by the Royal Canadian Mounted Police and Federal Minister Jason Kenney during the election.

== Results ==
Both the Liberals and Progressive Conservatives lost votes, and lost in the share of vote. Turnout was down and seven thousand fewer voters cast ballots total. The Greens and New Democrats increased both their raw vote and their share of the vote, and the new Island party took nearly a full percentage point. Three incumbent Liberal MLAs were defeated by Progressive Conservatives; the Progressive Conservatives retained one of the two seats they held at the dissolution of the previous legislature, as well as one vacant seat which they held prior to the resignation of Michael Currie from the legislature in March 2011, while the Liberals gained one seat whose Progressive Conservative incumbent did not stand for re-election.

The election saw one riding, Kellys Cross-Cumberland, have six candidates, a rarity in PEI elections.

Results of the election by polling division

The PC Party solidified their base in central-east PEI, winning four ridings that were part of the federal riding of Cardigan, and carried the region. The PC Party also managed to win a single seat on the northern tip of the Island.

↓
22	5
Liberal	PC

Summary of the Legislative Assembly of Prince Edward Island election results
Party	Party leader	Candidates	Seats				Popular vote		
Party	Party leader	Candidates	2007	Dissol.	2011	Change	#	%	Change
Liberal	Robert Ghiz	27	23	24	22	-1	38,315	51.38%	-1.55%
Progressive Conservative	Olive Crane	27	4	2	5	+1	29,950	40.16%	-1.19%
Green	Sharon Labchuk	22	-	-	0		3,254	4.36%	+1.32%
New Democratic	James Rodd	14	-	-	0		2,355	3.16%	+1.20%
Island	Billy Cann	12	*	-	0		682	0.91%	*
Independents and no affiliation		1	-	-	0		15	0.02%	-0.71%
Vacant		-	-	1					
Total		103	27	27	27		74,571		

* The Island Party of Prince Edward Island was not a registered political party at the time of the 2007 election.

Popular vote
Liberal	51.38%
PC	40.16%
Green	4.36%
New Democratic	3.16%
Others	0.94%

Seats summary
Liberal	81.48%
PC	18.52%

=== Synopsis of results ===
2011 PEI general election - synopsis of riding results (Note: Report of the Chief Electoral Officer of Prince Edward Island for the Provincial General Election of 3 October 2011 (PDF). Elections Prince Edward Island. 2015. pp. 2–6.)
Riding	#	Federal Riding	2007	Winning party (Note: percentages calculated on valid votes only)					Turnout (Note: including spoilt ballots)	Votes						
Riding	#	Federal Riding	2007	Party	Votes	Share	Margin #	Margin %	Turnout	Lib	PC	Green	NDP	Island	Ind	Total
Alberton-Roseville	26	EGM	Lib	Lib	1,604	56.18%	467	16.36%	83.10%	1,604	1,137	71	–	43	–	2,855
Belfast-Murray River	4	CAR	PC	Lib	1,135	45.86%	8	0.32%	79.02%	1,135	1,127	114	–	99	–	2,475
Borden-Kinkora	19	MPQ	Lib	Lib	1,590	49.41%	122	3.79%	77.85%	1,590	1,468	160	–	–	–	3,218
Charlottetown-Brighton	13	CHA	Lib	Lib	1,228	52.46%	529	22.60%	77.42%	1,228	699	238	176	–	–	2,341
Charlottetown-Lewis Point	14	CHA	Lib	Lib	1,411	52.01%	516	19.02%	70.01%	1,411	895	132	275	–	–	2,713
Charlottetown-Parkdale	11	CHA	Lib	Lib	1,510	61.76%	845	34.56%	73.78%	1,510	665	152	118	–	–	2,445
Charlottetown-Sherwood	10	CHA	Lib	Lib	1,538	53.93%	478	16.76%	77.86%	1,538	1,060	127	127	–	–	2,852
Charlottetown-Victoria Park	12	CHA	Lib	Lib	1,112	51.29%	530	24.45%	69.03%	1,112	582	278	177	19	–	2,168
Cornwall-Meadowbank	16	MPQ	Lib	Lib	1,686	63.46%	930	35.00%	71.03%	1,686	756	172	–	43	–	2,657
Evangeline-Miscouche	24	EGM	Lib	Lib	1,722	77.22%	1,304	58.48%	84.89%	1,722	418	64	–	26	–	2,230
Georgetown-St. Peters	2	CAR	PC	PC	1,575	53.30%	361	12.22%	83.91%	1,214	1,575	47	87	32	–	2,955
Kellys Cross-Cumberland	17	MPQ	Lib	Lib	1,768	54.02%	808	24.69%	77.54%	1,768	960	306	182	42	15	3,273
Kensington-Malpeque	20	MPQ	Lib	Lib	1,820	57.18%	655	20.58%	74.76%	1,820	1,165	–	198	–	–	3,183
Montague-Kilmuir	3	CAR	PC	Lib	1,127	46.57%	123	5.08%	78.10%	1,127	1,004	89	–	200	–	2,420
Morell-Mermaid	7	CAR	PC	PC	1,649	58.29%	616	21.77%	88.28%	1,033	1,649	114	–	33	–	2,829
O'Leary-Inverness	25	EGM	Lib	Lib	1,431	55.51%	284	11.02%	78.83%	1,431	1,147	–	–	–	–	2,578
Rustico-Emerald	18	MPQ	Lib	Lib	1,498	49.50%	157	5.19%	78.69%	1,498	1,341	187	–	–	–	3,026
Souris-Elmira	1	CAR	Lib	PC	1,302	48.58%	30	1.12%	86.25%	1,272	1,302	–	–	106	–	2,680
Stratford-Kinlock	6	CAR	Lib	PC	2,020	55.59%	779	21.44%	77.63%	1,241	2,020	168	205	–	–	3,634
Summerside-St. Eleanors	22	EGM	Lib	Lib	1,426	51.76%	389	14.12%	63.76%	1,426	1,037	145	147	–	–	2,755
Summerside-Wilmot	21	EGM	Lib	Lib	1,382	54.75%	445	17.63%	65.36%	1,382	937	205	–	–	–	2,524
Tignish-Palmer Road	27	EGM	Lib	PC	1,175	50.15%	33	1.41%	81.74%	1,142	1,175	–	–	26	–	2,343
Tracadie-Hillsborough Park	8	CHA	Lib	Lib	1,304	48.53%	168	6.25%	72.80%	1,304	1,136	93	136	18	–	2,687
Tyne Valley-Linkletter	23	EGM	Lib	Lib	1,390	57.27%	353	14.54%	71.68%	1,390	1,037	–	–	–	–	2,427
Vernon River-Stratford	5	CAR	Lib	Lib	1,311	50.52%	257	9.90%	77.29%	1,311	1,054	119	111	–	–	2,595
West Royalty-Springvale	15	CHA	Lib	Lib	1,432	45.93%	63	2.02%	75.31%	1,432	1,369	151	166	–	–	3,118
York-Oyster Bed	9	MPQ	Lib	Lib	1,988	55.30%	753	20.95%	79.55%	1,988	1,235	122	250	–	–	3,595

= open seat
= turnout is above provincial average
= incumbency arose from byelection gain
= incumbent re-elected in same riding
= other incumbent renominated

Resulting composition of the 64th General Assembly of Prince Edward Island
Source		Party		
Source		Lib	PC	Total
Seats retained	Incumbents returned	20	1	21
Seats retained	Open seats held		1	1
Seats changing hands	Incumbents defeated		3	3
Seats changing hands	Open seats gained	1		1
Seats changing hands	Byelection gain held	1		1
Total		22	5	27

=== Results by region ===
Party Name		Cardigan	Malpeque	Charlottetown	Egmont	Total
Liberal	Seats:	3	8	5	6	22
Liberal	Popular Vote:	42.54%	52.87%	54.31%	57.01%	51.38%
Progressive Conservative	Seats:	4	0	0	1	5
Progressive Conservative	Popular Vote:	49.68%	38.10%	31.16%	38.89%	40.16%
Total seats:		7	8	5	7	27
Parties that won no seats:
Green	Vote:	651	1,191	927	485	3,254
Green	Popular Vote:	3.32%	4.81%	7.40%	2.74%	4.36%
NDP	Vote:	403	932	873	147	2,355
NDP	Popular Vote:	2.06%	3.77%	6.97%	0.83%	3.16%
Island Party	Vote:	470	98	19	95	682
Island Party	Popular Vote:	2.40%	0.40%	0.15%	0.54%	0.91%
Independent	Vote:		15			15
Independent	Popular Vote:		0.06%			0.02%

== Incumbent MLAs not running for re-election ==
Progressive Conservative

- Michael Currie (resigned, March 28, 2011), Georgetown-St. Peters
- Jim Bagnall, Montague-Kilmuir

== Opinion polls ==
Polling Firm	Date of Polling	Link	Liberal	Progressive Conservatives	Greens	New Democrats
Corporate Research Associates	September 29, 2011	HTML	53	36	5	5
Corporate Research Associates	August 28, 2011	PDF	59	31	3	7
Corporate Research Associates	June 10, 2011	PDF	51	35	2	13
Corporate Research Associates	March 9, 2011	PDF	62	25	2	11
Corporate Research Associates	December 6, 2010	PDF	53	34	8	4
Corporate Research Associates	August 24, 2010	PDF	61	30	2	6
Corporate Research Associates	May 31, 2010	PDF	61	27	3	8
Corporate Research Associates	February 24, 2010	HTML	64	26	4	6
Corporate Research Associates	December 3, 2009	HTML	57	31	3	9
Corporate Research Associates	August 2009	HTML	62	27	5	6
Corporate Research Associates	May 2009	HTML	57	32	4	7
Corporate Research Associates	February 2009	HTML	64	28	2	6
Corporate Research Associates	November 2008	HTML	55	31	5	8
Corporate Research Associates	August 2008	HTML	63	25	6	6
Corporate Research Associates	May 2008	HTML	61	27	4	7
Corporate Research Associates	February 2008	HTML	68	34	4	6
Corporate Research Associates	November 2007	HTML	64	22	5	5
Election 2007	May 28, 2007	HTML	52.9	41.4	3.0	1.9

== Riding by riding results ==
=== Cardigan ===
Electoral district	Candidates						Incumbent
Electoral district	Liberal	PC	Green	NDP	Island	Other	Incumbent
Belfast-Murray River	Charlie McGeoghegan; 1,135 - (45.86%)	Darlene Compton; 1,127 - (45.54%)	John Burhoe; 114 - (4.61%)		Andy Clarey; 99 - (4.00%)		Charlie McGeoghegan
Georgetown-St. Peters	Kevin Gotell; 1,214 - (41.08%)	Steven Myers; 1,575 - (53.30%)	Jason Furness; 47 - (1.59%)	Jane Dunphy; 87 - (2.94%)	Ray Cantelo; 32 - (1.08%)		Vacant
Montague-Kilmuir	Allen Roach; 1,127 - (46.57%)	Greg Farrell; 1,004 - (41.49%)	Vanessa Young; 89 - (3.68%)		Billy Cann; 200 - (8.26%)		Jim Bagnall†
Morell-Mermaid	Dan MacDonald; 1,033 - (36.51%)	Olive Crane; 1,649 - (58.29%)	Darcie Lanthier; 114 - (4.03%)		Roger Nowe; 33 - (1.17%)		Olive Crane
Souris-Elmira	Allan Campbell; 1,272 - (47.46%)	Colin LaVie; 1,302 - (48.58%)			Jason MacGregor; 106 - (3.96%)		Allan Campbell
Stratford-Kinlock	Cynthia Dunsford; 1,241 - (34.15%)	James Aylward; 2,020 - (55.59%)	Donald Killorn; 168 - (4.62%)	Chris van Ouwerkerk; 205 - (5.64%)			Cynthia Dunsford
Vernon River-Stratford	Alan McIsaac; 1,311 - (50.52%)	Mary Ellen McInnis; 1,054 - (40.62%)	Marion Pirch; 119 - (4.59%)	Edith Perry; 111 - (4.28%)			Alan McIsaac

=== Malpeque ===
Electoral district	Candidates						Incumbent
Electoral district	Liberal	PC	Green	NDP	Island	Other	Incumbent
Borden-Kinkora	George Webster; 1,590 - (49.41%)	Jamie Fox; 1,468 - (45.62%)	Conor Leggott; 160 - (4.97%)				George Webster
Cornwall-Meadowbank	Ron MacKinley; 1,686 - (63.46%)	Larry Hogan; 756 - (28.45%)	Allieanna Ballagh; 172 - (6.47%)		Jay Gallant; 43 - (1.62%)		Ron MacKinley
Kellys Cross-Cumberland	Valerie Docherty; 1,768 - (54.10%)	Neila Auld; 960 - (29.38%)	Peter Bevan-Baker; 306 - (9.36%)	Jesse Reddin Cousins; 182 - (5.56%)	Paul Smitz; 37 - (1.13%)	Arthur C. Mackenzie; 15 - (0.46%)	Valerie Docherty
Kensington-Malpeque	Wes Sheridan; 1,820 - (57.18%)	Wilber Lamont; 1,165 - (36.60%)		George S. Hunter; 198 - (6.22%)			Wes Sheridan
Rustico-Emerald	Carolyn Bertram; 1,498 (49.50%)	Brad Trivers; 1,341 - (44.32%)	Ron Wagner; 187- (6.18%)				Carolyn Bertram
York-Oyster Bed	Robert Vessey; 1,988 - (55.30%)	Martie Murphy; 1,235 - (34.25%)	Jenet Clement; 122 - (3.39%)	James Rodd; 250 - (6.95%)			Robert Vessey

=== Charlottetown ===
Electoral district	Candidates						Incumbent
Electoral district	Liberal	PC	Green	NDP	Island	Other	Incumbent
Charlottetown-Brighton	Robert Ghiz; 1,228 - (52.46%)	Linda Clements; 699 - (29.86%)	Elizabeth Schoales; 238 - (10.17%)	Trevor John LeClerc; 176 - (7.52%)			Robert Ghiz
Charlottetown-Lewis Point	Kathleen Casey; 1,411 - (52.01%)	Parnell Kelly; 895 - (32.99%)	Charles Sanderson; 132 - (4.87%)	Jacquie Robichaud; 275 - (10.14%)			Kathleen Casey
Charlottetown-Parkdale	Doug Currie; 1,510 - (61.76%)	Bernie Flynn; 665 - (27.20%)	Eliza Knockwood; 152 - (6.22%)	Noel Pauley; 118 - (4.83%)			Doug Currie
Charlottetown-Sherwood	Robert Mitchell; 1,538 - (53.93%)	Mike Gillis; 1,060 - (37.17%)	Sarah Jones; 127 - (4.45%)	Kat Murphy; 127 - (4.45%)			Robert Mitchell
Charlottetown-Victoria Park	Richard Brown; 1,112- (51.29%)	Myles MacKinnon; 582- (26.85%)	Sharon Labchuk; 278 - (12.82%)	Rita Jackson; 177 - (8.16%)	Philip Stewart; 19 - (0.88%)		Richard Brown
Tracadie-Hillsborough Park	Buck Watts; 1,304 - (48.53%)	Glen Kelly; 1,136 - (42.28%)	Helene LaRouche; 93 - (3.46%)	Ron Kelly; 136 - (5.06%)	Gary Chipman; 18 - (0.67%)		Buck Watts
West Royalty-Springvale	Bush Dumville; 1,432 - (45.93%)	Gary Bowness; 1,369 - (43.91%)	Liz Vaine; 151 - (4.84%)	Andrew Want; 166 - (5.32%)			Bush Dumville

=== Egmont ===
Electoral district	Candidates						Incumbent
Electoral district	Liberal	PC	Green	NDP	Island	Other	Incumbent
Alberton-Roseville	Pat Murphy; 1,604 - (56.18%)	David Gordon; 1,137 - (39.82%)	Gerald O'Meara; 71 - (2.49%)		Mitch Gallant; 43 - (1.51%)		Pat Murphy
Evangeline-Miscouche	Sonny Gallant; 1,722 - (77.22%)	Edgar Arsenault; 418 - (18.74%)	Melissa Hotte; 64 - (2.87%)		Arthur Arsenault; 26 - (1.17%)		Sonny Gallant
O'Leary-Inverness	Robert Henderson; 1,431 - (55.51%)	Daniel MacDonald; 1,147 - (44.49%)					Robert Henderson
Summerside-St. Eleanors	Gerard Greenan; 1,426 - (51.76%)	Merlin Cormier; 1,037 - (37.64%)	Caleb Adams; 145 - (5.26%)	Paulette Halupa; 147 - (5.30%)			Gerard Greenan
Summerside-Wilmot	Janice Sherry; 1,382 - (54.74%)	Shirley Anne Cameron; 937 - (37.12%)	Rosalyn Ridlington Abbott; 205 - (8.12%)				Janice Sherry
Tignish-Palmer Road	Neil LeClair; 1,142 (48.74%)	Hal Perry; 1,175 - (50.15%)			Derek D. Peters; 26 - (1.11%)		Neil LeClair
Tyne Valley-Linkletter	Paula Biggar; 1,390 - (57.27%)	Jim Henwood; 1,037 - (42.73%)					Paula Biggar
