= 2017 Charlottetown-Parkdale provincial by-election =

Canadian election

← 2015	November 27, 2017	2019 →

District of Charlottetown-Parkdale
- Registered: 3,598
- Turnout: 60.83%
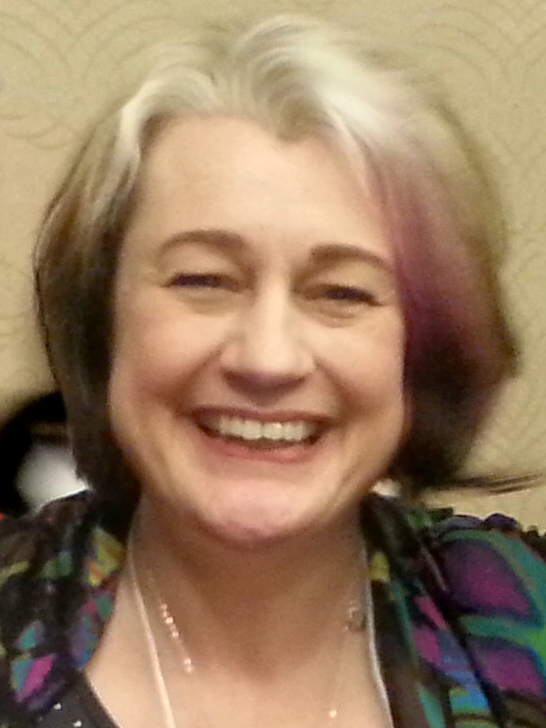

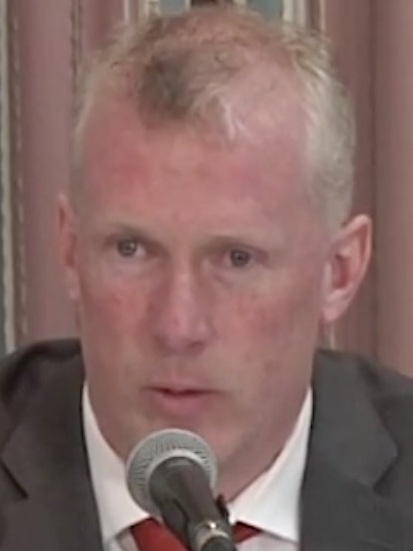
	First party	Second party
		Lib
Candidate	Hannah Bell	Bob Doiron
Party	Green	Liberal
Popular vote	768	621
Percentage	35.28%	28.53%
Swing	▲16.12%	▼15.18%
	Third party	Fourth party
	PC
Candidate	Melissa Hilton	Michael Redmond
Party	Progressive Conservative	New Democratic
Popular vote	586	202
Percentage	26.92%	9.28%
Swing	▲0.72%	▼1.67%
MLA before election
Doug Currie
Liberal
Elected MLA
Hannah Bell
Green

The 2017 Charlottetown-Parkdale provincial by-election took place on November 27, 2017. The by-election was triggered by the resignation of the district's incumbent MLA Doug Currie on October 19.

Green Party candidate Hannah Bell won the election, becoming the second member of the party to be elected to the Legislative Assembly after Peter Bevan-Baker successfully contested the district of Kellys Cross-Cumberland in the 2015 general election.

== Background ==
=== District profile ===
Charlottetown-Parkdale was established ahead of the 2007 provincial election. The Charlottetown district covered the entirety of the neighbourhoods of Belvedere and St. Avard's as well as most of Parkdale.

The district had voted reliably Liberal since its inception, sending Doug Currie to the Legislative Assembly in the 2007 election and re-electing him in 2011 and 2015.

=== Resignation of Doug Currie ===
On October 17, 2017, incumbent MLA Doug Currie announced his resignation from the Legislative Assembly effective immediately. In an interview with CBC News, Currie stated "My decision really is about what's in the best for Doug Currie and my two girls — I don't think there's any perfect time to leave public office, but I feel excited about leaving. I feel excited about what I've accomplished." Currie was first elected to the Legislative Assembly in the 2007 election and had served in various ministerial roles under three successive Liberal governments. At the time of his resignation, Currie was Minister of Education, Early Learning and Culture.

== Candidates ==
Bob Doiron won the Liberal nomination, defeating challenger Marcia Carroll at the party's nomination meeting on October 30. Doiron has been a member of the University of Prince Edward Island Security Police Department since 1987 and has represented the ward of Mount Edward on the Charlottetown City Council since 2014.

The Progressive Conservatives nominated Melissa Hilton at a meeting on November 1. Hilton has represented the ward of Stonepark on the Charlottetown City Council since 2005.

Hannah Bell won the Green nomination against Karla Bernard by a vote of 72 to 22 at the party's nomination meeting on October 30. Bell was the party's shadow finance critic and was the executive director of the PEI Business Women's Association.

The New Democratic Party nominated their leader Michael Redmond. Redmond had been leader of the NDP PEI since October 2012.

== Campaign ==
Candidates Hannah Bell and Michael Redmond caused controversy when they campaigned on November 11, Remembrance Day in Canada. While all four candidates attended ceremonies that day, Bob Dorion and Melissa Hilton chose not to campaign. Bell defended her decision to campaign, stating "The reason veterans fought for us was to secure our democracy."

== Results ==
Prince Edward Island provincial by-election, 27 November 2017 Resignation of Doug Currie
Party	Candidate	Votes	%	±%
Green	Hannah Bell	768	35.28	+16.12
Liberal	Bob Doiron	621	28.53	-15.18
Progressive Conservative	Melissa Hilton	586	26.92	+0.72
New Democratic	Michael Redmond	202	9.28	-1.67
Total valid votes		2,177	100.00	
Green gain from Liberal		Swing		+15.65

=== Reactions and aftermath ===
In an email statement, Green Party of Canada leader Elizabeth May said the outcome of the by-election showed that "voters are increasingly looking to Greens when it comes to strengthening democracy, fighting for those less fortunate, and leading the way to a sustainable future." Andrew Weaver, leader of the Green Party of British Columbia, released a statement congratulating Hannah Bell and characterizing her victory as a "tidal shift."

Speaking to reporters on election night, Progressive Conservative leader James Aylward stated "Clearly, the MacLauchlan government...has been sent a message. Was it the message that I was necessarily hoping for tonight? Certainly not, but clearly they've been sent a message."

Liberal Premier Wade MacLauchlan did not view the result as significant, saying "I think you really have to look at a by-election as a by-election, with local context and what people have to take into account as they're making their choices. And of course the turnout. That's the nature of by-elections."

Following his fourth-place finish, NDP leader Michael Redmond announced on December 5 that he would meet with the party's executive within the week to determine the future of his leadership. The following day, Redmond announced his resignation as party leader.
