= 2007 Prince Edward Island general election =

Canadian provincial election

- May 28, 2007

27 seats of the Legislative Assembly of Prince Edward Island 14 seats needed for a majority
- Turnout: 83.84%
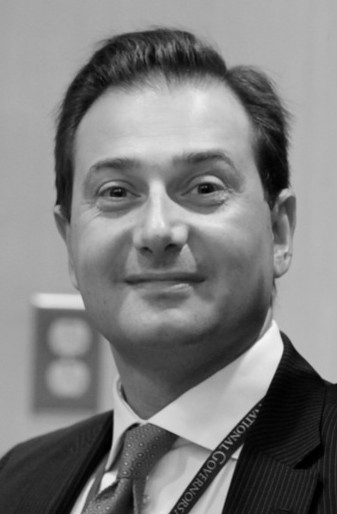
	First party	Second party
		PC
Leader	Robert Ghiz	Pat Binns
Party	Liberal	Progressive Conservative
Leader since	April 5, 2003	May 4, 1996
Leader's seat	Charlottetown-Brighton	Belfast-Murray River
Last election	4	23
Seats won	23	4
Seat change	▲19	▼19
Popular vote	43,205	33,754
Percentage	52.93%	41.35%
Swing	▲10.27%	▼12.94%
- Popular vote by riding. As this is an FPTP election, seat totals are not determined by popular vote, but instead via plurality results by each riding.
Premier before election
Pat Binns
Progressive Conservative
Premier after election
Robert Ghiz
Liberal

The 2007 Prince Edward Island general election was held on May 28, 2007. It elected members of the Legislative Assembly of the province of Prince Edward Island, Canada. The incumbent Progressive Conservative government was defeated by the Liberal opposition after holding power for eleven years.

The newly formed Green Party captured 3.04% of the vote or 4.44% in ridings they contested, beating out the New Democratic Party for third place. The New Democrats fell to 1.96% or 3.43% in ridings contested. They captured 3.06% of the vote, or 3.48% in the 24 of the 27 ridings they contested in the 2003 election.

Only eight Members of the Legislative Assembly were re-elected (one in a different district). Seven did not run for re-election; twelve were defeated. The government suffered loss of 15 seats and was defeated.

In 2006, a controversy arose in Prince Edward Island over the provincial government's decision to throw out an electoral map drawn by an independent commission. Instead, they created two new maps. The government adopted the second of them, which was designed by the caucus of the governing Progressive Conservative Party of Prince Edward Island. Opposition parties and the media attacked Premier Pat Binns for what they saw as gerrymandering of districts. Among other things, the government adopted a map that ensured that every current Member of the Legislative Assembly from the premier's party had a district to run in for re-election, but in the original map, several had been redistricted. However, in the 2007 provincial election only eight Members of the Legislative Assembly were re-elected (one in a different district) (seven did not run for re-election; twelve were defeated).

== Results ==
↓
23	4
Liberal	PC

Summary of the May 28, 2007 Legislative Assembly of Prince Edward Island election results
Party	Party leader	Candidates	Seats				Popular vote		
Party	Party leader	Candidates	2003	Dissol.	2007	Change	#	%	Change
Liberals	Robert Ghiz	27	4	4	23	+19	43,205	52.93%	+10.27%
Progressive Conservatives	Pat Binns	27	23	23	4	-19	33,754	41.35%	-12.94%
Green	Sharon Labchuk	18	*	-	-	-	2,482	3.04%	*
New Democrats	Dean Constable	15	-	-	-	-	1,597	1.96%	-1.10%
Independents and no affiliation		2	-	-	-	-	594	0.73%	+0.73%
Total		89	27	27	27	-	81,632	100%	

Results of the election by polling division

* Green Party of Prince Edward Island was not a registered political party at the time of the 2003 election.

Popular vote
Liberal	52.93%
PC	41.35%
Green	3.04%
New Democratic	1.96%
Others	0.72%

Seats summary
Liberal	85.19%
PC	14.81%

=== Synopsis of results ===
2007 PEI general election - synopsis of riding results (Note: Report of the Chief Electoral Officer of Prince Edward Island for the Provincial General Election of 28 May 2007 (PDF). Elections Prince Edward Island. 2007. (some pages missing from the scan))
Riding	#	Federal Riding	2003	Winning party (Note: percentages calculated on valid votes only)					Turnout (Note: including spoilt ballots)	Votes					
Riding	#	Federal Riding	2003	Party	Votes	Share	Margin #	Margin %	Turnout	Lib	PC	Green	NDP	Ind	Total
Alberton-Roseville*	26	EGM	PC	Lib	1,487	49.48%	123	4.09%	88.91%	1,487	1,364	95	59	–	3,005
Belfast-Murray River*	4	CAR	PC	PC	1,527	55.15%	397	14.34%	84.47%	1,130	1,527	112	–	–	2,769
Borden-Kinkora	19	MPQ	PC	Lib	1,811	52.43%	460	13.32%	82.36%	1,811	1,351	292	–	–	3,454
Charlottetown-Brighton*	13	CHA	Lib	Lib	1,669	60.25%	753	27.18%	86.86%	1,669	916	185	–	–	2,770
Charlottetown-Lewis Point*	14	CHA	PC	Lib	1,865	58.94%	566	17.89%	82.34%	1,865	1,299	–	–	–	3,164
Charlottetown-Parkdale	11	CHA	New	Lib	1,666	57.43%	565	19.48%	84.04%	1,666	1,101	–	134	–	2,901
Charlottetown-Sherwood	10	CHA	New	Lib	1,712	54.78%	467	14.94%	84.05%	1,712	1,245	83	85	–	3,125
Charlottetown-Victoria Park*	12	CHA	Lib	Lib	1,536	53.58%	578	20.16%	84.34%	1,536	958	166	207	–	2,867
Cornwall-Meadowbank*	16	MPQ	Lib	Lib	1,761	62.31%	853	30.18%	77.81%	1,761	908	78	79	–	2,826
Evangeline-Miscouche	24	EGM	PC	Lib	1,311	55.81%	376	16.01%	88.92%	1,311	935	103	–	–	2,349
Georgetown-St. Peters*	2	CAR	PC	PC	1,678	53.08%	289	9.14%	88.34%	1,389	1,678	–	94	–	3,161
Kellys Cross-Cumberland*	17	MPQ	Lib	Lib	1,811	52.01%	565	16.23%	83.35%	1,811	1,246	238	187	–	3,482
Kensington-Malpeque	20	MPQ	PC	Lib	1,788	50.31%	214	6.02%	81.62%	1,788	1,574	192	–	–	3,554
Montague-Kilmuir*	3	CAR	PC	PC	1,447	52.43%	134	4.86%	89.00%	1,313	1,447	–	–	–	2,760
Morell-Mermaid*	7	CAR	PC	PC	1,384	46.46%	443	14.87%	86.53%	941	1,384	–	94	560	2,979
O'Leary-Inverness*	25	EGM	PC	Lib	1,731	62.13%	676	24.26%	83.20%	1,731	1,055	–	–	–	2,786
Parkdale-Belvedere	–	CHA	PC	Dissolved											
Rustico-Emerald*	18	MPQ	PC	Lib	1,970	60.28%	869	26.59%	89.61%	1,970	1,101	197	–	–	3,268
Sherwood-Hillsborough	–	CHA	PC	Dissolved											
Souris-Elmira	1	CAR	PC	Lib	1,422	50.34%	210	7.43%	87.06%	1,422	1,212	70	121	–	2,825
Stratford-Kinlock*	6	CAR	PC	Lib	1,682	48.26%	81	2.32%	85.99%	1,682	1,601	129	73	–	3,485
Summerside-St. Eleanors*	22	EGM	PC	Lib	1,697	54.36%	469	15.02%	73.59%	1,697	1,228	86	77	34	3,122
Summerside-Wilmot*	21	EGM	PC	Lib	1,645	57.10%	582	20.20%	73.79%	1,645	1,063	–	173	–	2,881
Tignish-Palmer Road*	27	EGM	PC	Lib	1,569	55.15%	293	10.30%	91.60%	1,569	1,276	–	–	–	2,845
Tracadie-Fort Augustus	–	MPQ	PC	Dissolved											
Tracadie-Hillsborough Park	8	CHA	New	Lib	1,577	55.39%	475	16.68%	79.31%	1,577	1,102	95	73	–	2,847
Tyne Valley-Linkletter*	23	EGM	PC	Lib	1,599	58.06%	444	16.12%	75.02%	1,599	1,155	–	–	–	2,754
Vernon River-Stratford*	5	CAR	PC	Lib	1,387	48.03%	66	2.29%	86.32%	1,387	1,321	100	80	–	2,888
West Royalty-Springvale*	15	CHA	PC	Lib	1,766	55.07%	460	14.34%	83.89%	1,766	1,306	135	–	–	3,207
York-Oyster Bed*	9	MPQ	PC	Lib	1,970	55.37%	569	15.99%	88.74%	1,970	1,401	126	61	–	3,558

* - renamed in 2007 redistribution

= open seat
= turnout is above provincial average
= incumbent re-elected in same riding
= previously incumbent in another riding
= other incumbent renominated

Resulting composition of the 63rd General Assembly of Prince Edward Island
Source		Party		
Source		Lib	PC	Total
Seats retained	Incumbents returned	3	4	7
Seats retained	Open seats held	1		1
Seats changing hands	Incumbents defeated	12		12
Seats changing hands	Open seats gained	6		6
Seats changing hands	Taken by candidate previously incumbent in another riding	1		1
Total		23	4	27

=== Largest and smallest margins of victory ===
The five largest margins of victory were:

1. Rustico-Emerald: Carolyn Bertram, Liberal, defeated David Blacquiere, PC, by 869 votes.
2. Cornwall-Meadowbank: Ron MacKinley, Liberal, defeated Margaret Duffy, PC, by 853 votes.
3. Charlottetown-Brighton: Robert Ghiz, Liberal, defeated John Abbott, PC, by 753 votes.
4. O'Leary-Inverness: Robert Henderson, Liberal, defeated Eva Rodgerson, PC, by 678 votes.
5. Summerside-Wilmot: Janice Sherry, Liberal, defeated Gerard McCardle, PC, by 582 votes.

The five smallest margins of victory were:

1. Vernon River-Stratford: Alan McIsaac, Liberal, defeated Allan Fraser, PC, by 66 votes.
2. Stratford-Kinlock: Cynthia Dunsford, Liberal, defeated David McKenna, PC, by 81 votes.
3. Alberton-Roseville: Pat Murphy, Liberal, defeated Cletus Dunn, PC, by 123 votes.
4. Montague-Kilmuir: Jim Bagnall, PC, defeated Billy Cann, Liberal, by 134 votes.
5. Souris-Elmira: Allan Campbell, Liberal, defeated Andy Mooney, PC, by 210 votes.

=== Results by place ===
Party	Seats	Second	Third	Fourth
Liberal	23	4	0	0
Progressive Conservative	4	23	0	0
Green	0	0	14	4
New Democratic	0	0	7	8
Independent	0	0	1	0

=== Results by region ===
Party Name		Cardigan	Malpeque	Charlottetown	Egmont	Total
Liberal	Seats:	3	8	5	7	23
Liberal	Popular Vote:	44.40%	54.91%	56.98%	55.92%	52.93%
Progressive Conservative	Seats:	4	0	0	0	4
Progressive Conservative	Popular Vote:	48.74%	38.41%	37.22%	40.90%	41.35%
Total seats:		7	8	5	7	27
Parties that won no seats:
Green	Vote:	411	1,336	434	284	2,482
Green	Popular Vote:	1.97%	5.19%	2.93%	1.44%	3.04%
NDP	Vote:	462	384	426	309	1,597
NDP	Popular Vote:	2.21%	1.49%	2.87%	1.57%	1.96%
Independent	Vote:	560	xx	xx	34	594
Independent	Popular Vote:	2.68%	xx	xx	0.17%	0.73%

== Timeline ==
- April 10, 2007 - Treasurer Mitch Murphy unveils the provincial budget. Many people referred to this budget as an "election budget", as it had promises for everyone.
- April 17, 2007 - Canadian Broadcasting Corporation (CBC) news article declares Wikipedia the new PEI election battleground, with edits to the Pat Binns article that some say are partisan in nature.
- April 26, 2007 - The ban on canned carbonated beverages was lifted. Canned beverages such as beer will be available by the summer, while soda will be available by January 1, 2008. This is thought to be a way to "grab votes" according to Sharon Labchuk and Dean Constable.
- April 30, 2007 - Premier Pat Binns calls the election at his constituency's Progressive Conservative nominating convention.
- May 1, 2007 - The Liberal Party release a series of political attack ads which many call "United States-style". One advertisement ran during Tuesday night's broadcast of American Idol on CTV. This type of advertising isn't normally seen in Island elections.
- May 11, 2007 - All four party leaders talk rural health care and doctor recruitment.
- May 15, 2007 - The first of a string of leaders debates was held. The leaders from all four parties attended.
- May 28, 2007 - Liberals win a majority of seats, in the PEI Legislature. Taking 23 of 27, while the Progressive Conservatives drop to 4 seats. The New Democrats and the Greens win none.
- June 12, 2007 - Liberal government of Robert Ghiz is sworn in, following resignation of the Pat Binns government.
- August 30, 2007 - Pat Binns named ambassador to Ireland and steps down as leader of the opposition, and as leader of the Progressive Conservative Party of Prince Edward Island.
- September 4, 2007 - Olive Crane named interim leader of the Progressive Conservative Party of Prince Edward Island and made leader of the opposition.

== Riding by riding results ==
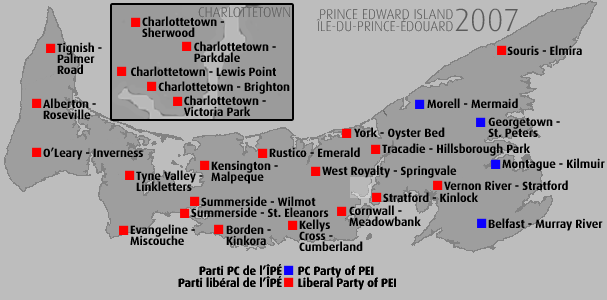

=== Cardigan ===
Electoral district	Candidates					Incumbent
Electoral district	PC	Liberal	Green	NDP	Other	Incumbent
Belfast-Murray River	Pat Binns 1,527 (55.15%)	Charlie McGeoghegan 1,130 (40.81%)	Ahmon Katz 112 (4.04%)			Pat Binns
Georgetown-St. Peters	Michael Currie 1,678 (53.08%)	Danny Walker 1,389 (43.94%)		Jane Dunphy 94 (2.97%)		Michael Currie
Montague-Kilmuir	Jim Bagnall 1,447 (52.43%)	Billy Cann 1,313 (47.57%)				Jim Bagnall
Morell-Mermaid	Olive Crane 1,384 (46.46%)	Doug Deacon 941 (31.59%)		Mike Avery 94 (3.16%)	Larry McGuire (Ind.) 560 (18.80%)	Olive Crane
Souris-Elmira	Andy Mooney 1,212 (42.90%)	Allan Campbell 1,422 (50.34%)	Rachel Leslie 70 (2.48%)	Betty Fay 121 (4.28%)		Andy Mooney
Stratford-Kinlock	David McKenna 1,601 (45.94%)	Cynthia Dunsford 1,682 (48.26%)	Mark Wellman 129 (3.70%)	Jane McNeil 73 (2.09)		David McKenna
Vernon River-Stratford	Allan Fraser 1,321 (45.74%)	Alan McIsaac 1,387 (48.03%)	Gary Clauseheide 100 (3.46%)	Edith Perry 80 (2.77%)		Wilbur MacDonald†

=== Malpeque ===
Electoral district	Candidates					Incumbent
Electoral district	PC	Liberal	Green	NDP	Other	Incumbent
Borden-Kinkora	Fred McCardle 1,351 (39.11%)	George Webster 1,811 (52.43%)	Jamie Larkin 292 (8.45%)			Fred McCardle
Cornwall-Meadowbank	Margaret Duffy 908 (32.13%)	Ron MacKinley 1,761 (62.31%)	Paul Ness 78 (2.76%)	Kirk Brown 79 (2.80%)		Ron MacKinley
Kellys Cross-Cumberland	Steven Stead 1,246 (35.78%)	Valerie Docherty 1,811 (52.01%)	Peter Bevan-Baker 221 (6.84%)	Lorraine Begley 171 (5.37%)		Carolyn Bertram
Kensington-Malpeque	Mitch Murphy 1,574 (44.29%)	Wes Sheridan 1,788 (50.31%)	Jodie Bowmaster 192 (5.40%)			Mitch Murphy
Rustico-Emerald	David Blacquiere 1,101 (33.69%)	Carolyn Bertram 1,970 (60.28%)	Sharon Labchuk 197 (6.03%)			Beth MacKenzie†
York-Oyster Bed	Jamie Ballem 1,401 (39.38%)	Robert Vessey 1,970 (55.37%)	Joan Cullen 126 (3.54%)	James Rodd 61 (1.71%)		Jamie Ballem

=== Charlottetown ===
Electoral district	Candidates					Incumbent
Electoral district	PC	Liberal	Green	NDP	Other	Incumbent
Charlottetown-Brighton	John Abbott 916 (33.07%)	Robert Ghiz 1,669 (60.25%)	Cindy Burton 185 (6.68%)			Robert Ghiz
Charlottetown-Lewis Point	Wes MacAleer 1,299 (41.06%)	Kathleen Casey 1,865 (58.94%)				Wes MacAleer
Charlottetown-Parkdale	Mike Molyneaux 1,101 (37.95%)	Doug Currie 1,666 (57.43%)		Zain Esseghaier 134 (4.62%)		Elmer MacFadyen †
Charlottetown-Sherwood	Chester Gillan 1,245 (39.84%)	Robert Mitchell 1,712 (54.78%)	Kat Murphy 83 (2.66%)	Brian Pollard 85 (2.72%)		Chester Gillan
Charlottetown-Victoria Park	Jason Lee 958 (33.41%)	Richard Brown 1,536 (53.58%)	Denise Reiser 166 (5.79%)	Dean Constable 207 (7.22%)		Richard Brown
Tracadie-Hillsborough Park	Elmer MacFadyen 1,102 (38.71%)	Buck Watts 1,577 (55.39%)	Robert Pendergast 95 (3.34%)	Peter MacFarlane 73 (2.56%)		Mildred Dover†
West Royalty-Springvale	Wayne Collins 1,306 (40.72%)	Bush Dumville 1,766 (55.07%)	Larry Cosgrave 135 (4.21%)			Wayne Collins

=== Egmont ===
Electoral district	Candidates					Incumbent
Electoral district	PC	Liberal	Green	NDP	Other	Incumbent
Alberton-Roseville	Cletus Dunn 1,364 (45.39%)	Pat Murphy 1,487 (49.84%)	Gerald O'Meara 95 (3.16%)	Jillian Kilfoil 59 (1.96%)		Cletus Dunn
Evangeline-Miscouche	Wilfred Arsenault 935 (39.80%)	Sonny Gallant 1,311 (55.81%)	Mannie Gallant 103 (4.38%)			Wilfred Arsenault
O'Leary-Inverness	Eva Rodgerson 1,055 (37.87%)	Robert Henderson 1,731 (62.13%)				Eva Rodgerson
Summerside-St. Eleanors	Brent Gallant 1,228 (39.33%)	Gerard Greenan 1,697 (54.36%)	Stuart Smith 86 (2.75%)	Paulette Halupa 77 (2.47%)	John W. A. Curtis (Ind.) 34 (1.09%)	Helen MacDonald†
Summerside-Wilmot	Gerard McCardle 1,063 (36.90%)	Janice Sherry 1,645 (57.10%)		Ryan Pollard 173 (6.00%)		Greg Deighan†
Tignish-Palmer Road	Gail Shea 1,276 (44.85%)	Neil LeClair 1,569 (55.15%)				Gail Shea
Tyne Valley-Linkletter	Philip Brown 1,155 (41.94%)	Paula Biggar 1,599 (58.06%)				Philip Brown
