= James Rodd =

Leader of the New Democratic Party of Prince Edward Island
- In office November 2007 – October 13, 2012
- Preceded by: Dean Constable
- Succeeded by: Mike Redmond

Personal details
- Born: January 29, 1954 (age 72)
- Party: Green (2017–present)
- Other political affiliations: New Democratic Party (until 2017)
- Profession: Farmer

James Rodd (January 29, 1956) was the leader of the New Democratic Party of Prince Edward Island from November 2007 when he was selected as interim leader at the party's annual general meeting following the resignation of Dean Constable. Rodd was ratified as leader at a leadership convention held on April 4, 2009.

Rodd, an organic farmer, was a candidate for the district of Borden-Kinkora in the 2003 provincial election and in York-Oyster Bed in the 2007 provincial election and the 2011 provincial election. Rodd is also past president of the Island NDP. He announced his intention to resign as leader of the party on February 8, 2012. and was succeeded as party leader by Mike Redmond in October of that year, upon his resignation.

In 2017, Rodd, along with former PEI politicians including Cynthia Dunsford and Alan Buchanan, both former Liberal MLAs, officially joined the province's Green Party due that party's member Hannah Bell by-election win in Charlottetown-Parkdale, which was the first time in PEI politics that third party had won in by-election, and their shared interest with that party's position of promoting voting reform in the province in the form of proportional representation.
