= Robert Vessey =

Robert Vessey may refer to:

- Robert Vessey (Canadian politician), member of the Legislative Assembly of Prince Edward Island
- Robert S. Vessey (1858–1929), governor of South Dakota
