= Sherwood-Hillsborough =

Former provincial electoral district in Prince Edward Island, Canada

Prince Edward Island electoral district

Defunct provincial electoral district
- Legislature: Legislative Assembly of Prince Edward Island
- District created: 1996
- District abolished: 2007
- First contested: 1996
- Last contested: 2003

Demographics
- Census division: Queens County
- Census subdivision: Charlottetown

No. 10 Sherwood-Hillsborough was a provincial electoral district for the Legislative Assembly of Prince Edward Island, Canada. It was created for the 1996 election out of the dual member 5th Queens riding. It was divided prior to the 2007 election into Charlottetown-Sherwood, Tracadie-Hillsborough Park, and Charlottetown-Parkdale.

== Members ==
The riding elected the following members of the Legislative Assembly:

Members of the Legislative Assembly for Sherwood-Hillsborough
Assembly	Years	Member	Party
See 5th Queens 1873–1996
60th	1996–2000	Elmer MacFadyen	Progressive Conservative
61st	2000–2003	Elmer MacFadyen	Progressive Conservative
62nd	2003–2007	Elmer MacFadyen	Progressive Conservative
See Charlottetown-Sherwood, Tracadie-Hillsborough Park and Charlottetown-Parkdale

== Election results ==
2003 Prince Edward Island general election
Party	Candidate	Votes	%	±%
Progressive Conservative	Elmer MacFadyen	1,480	51.00	-12.00
Liberal	Robert Mitchell	1,347	46.42	+16.36
New Democratic	Ronald G. Kelly	75	2.58	-4.36
Total valid votes		2,902	100.0	
Progressive Conservative hold		Swing		-14.18

2000 Prince Edward Island general election
Party	Candidate	Votes	%	±%
Progressive Conservative	Elmer MacFadyen	1,815	63.00	+10.24
Liberal	Allan Poulton	866	30.06	-10.29
New Democratic	Victoria Hill	200	6.94	+0.05
Total valid votes		2,881	100.0	
Progressive Conservative hold		Swing		+10.26

1996 Prince Edward Island general election
Party	Candidate	Votes	%
Progressive Conservative	Elmer MacFadyen	1,585	52.76
Liberal	Larry Hughes	1,212	40.35
New Democratic	Ronald Kelly	207	6.89
Total valid votes		3,004	100.0
This district was created from parts of the dual-member riding of 5th Queens

== See also ==
- List of Prince Edward Island provincial electoral districts
- Canadian provincial electoral districts
