= Charlottetown-Sherwood =

Former provincial electoral district in Prince Edward Island, Canada

Prince Edward Island electoral district
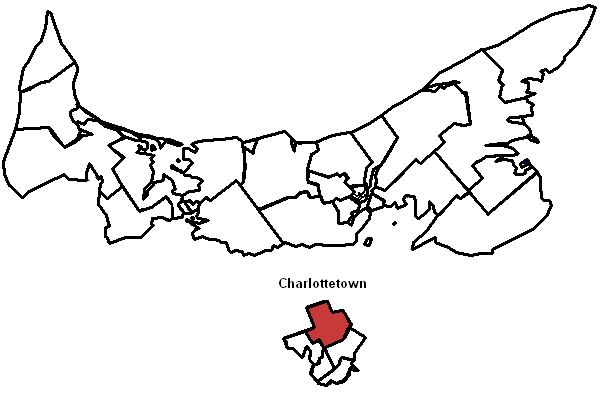
- Coordinates: 46.266°N 63.134°W

Defunct provincial electoral district
- Legislature: Legislative Assembly of Prince Edward Island
- District created: 2007
- District abolished: 2019
- First contested: 2007
- Last contested: 2015

Demographics
- Census division: Queens County
- Census subdivision: Charlottetown

Charlottetown-Sherwood was a provincial electoral district for the Legislative Assembly of Prince Edward Island, Canada. It was created prior to the 2007 election from Stanhope-East Royalty, Sherwood-Hillsborough, Parkdale-Belvedere, and Winsloe-West Royalty.

The district was replaced by Charlottetown-Winsloe.

== Members ==
The riding has elected the following members of the Legislative Assembly:

Members of the Legislative Assembly for Charlottetown-Sherwood
Assembly	Years	Member	Party
See Stanhope-East Royalty, Sherwood-Hillsborough, Parkdale-Belvedere and Winsloe-West Royalty (1996–2007)
63rd	2007–2011	Robert Mitchell	Liberal
64th	2011–2015	Robert Mitchell	Liberal
65th	2015–2019	Robert Mitchell	Liberal

== Election results ==
=== Charlottetown-Sherwood, 2007–2019 ===
2015 Prince Edward Island general election
Party	Candidate	Votes	%	±%
Liberal	Robert Mitchell	1,425	45.81	-8.12
Progressive Conservative	Mike Gillis	1,031	33.14	-4.03
New Democratic	Karalee McAskill	360	11.57	+7.12
Green	Mitchell Gallant	295	9.48	+5.03
Total valid votes		3,111	100.0	
Liberal hold		Swing		-2.04

2011 Prince Edward Island general election
Party	Candidate	Votes	%	±%
Liberal	Robert Mitchell	1,538	53.93	-0.85
Progressive Conservative	Mike Gillis	1,060	37.17	-2.67
New Democratic	Kat Murphy	127	4.45	+1.73
Green	Sarah Jones	127	4.45	+1.79
Total valid votes		2,852	100.0	
Liberal hold		Swing		+0.91

2007 Prince Edward Island general election
Party	Candidate	Votes	%	±%
Liberal	Robert Mitchell	1,712	54.78	+19.42
Progressive Conservative	Chester Gillan	1,245	39.84	-21.73
New Democratic	Brian Pollard	85	2.72	-0.35
Green	Kat Murphy	83	2.66	
Total valid votes		3,125	100.0	
This was a newly created district
Liberal gain from Progressive Conservative		Swing		+20.57

=== 2016 electoral reform plebiscite results ===
2016 Prince Edward Island electoral reform referendum
Side	Votes	%
First Past the Post	522	31.31
Mixed Member Proportional	487	29.21
Dual Member Proportional Representation	338	20.28
Preferential Voting	165	9.90
First Past the Post plus leaders	155	9.30
Two-choice preferred result
Mixed Member Proportional	851	53.42
First Past the Post	742	46.58
Total votes cast	1,667	42.67
Registered voters	3,908	
Source "Plebiscite Report" (PDF).

== See also ==
- List of Prince Edward Island provincial electoral districts
- Canadian provincial electoral districts
