= Parkdale-Belvedere =

Former provincial electoral district in Prince Edward Island, Canada

Coordinates: 46.257°N 63.119°W

Prince Edward Island electoral district

Defunct provincial electoral district
- Legislature: Legislative Assembly of Prince Edward Island
- District created: 1996
- District abolished: 2007
- First contested: 1996
- Last contested: 2003

Demographics
- Census division: Queens County
- Census subdivision: Charlottetown

Parkdale-Belvedere was a provincial electoral district for the Legislative Assembly of Prince Edward Island, Canada. It was created before the 1996 election out of the dual-member 5th Queens riding. It was abolished prior to the 2007 election into Charlottetown-Sherwood and Charlottetown-Parkdale.

== Members ==
The riding has elected the following members of the Legislative Assembly:

Members of the Legislative Assembly for Charlottetown-Sherwood
Assembly	Years	Member	Party
5th Queens 1873–1996
60th	1996–2000	Chester Gillan	Progressive Conservative
61st	2000–2003	Chester Gillan	Progressive Conservative
62nd	2003–2007	Chester Gillan	Progressive Conservative
See Charlottetown-Sherwood and Charlottetown-Parkdale

== Election results ==
2003 Prince Edward Island general election
Party	Candidate	Votes	%	±%
Progressive Conservative	Chester Gillan	1,562	61.57	-5.92
Liberal	Charlie Cooke	897	35.36	+10.15
New Democratic	Nick Boragina	78	3.07	-4.23
Total valid votes		2,537	100.0	
Progressive Conservative hold		Swing		-8.04

2000 Prince Edward Island general election
Party	Candidate	Votes	%	±%
Progressive Conservative	Chester Gillan	1,719	67.49	+10.12
Liberal	Jacob Mal	642	25.21	-11.30
New Democratic	Edith Perry	186	7.30	+1.18
Total valid votes		2,547	100.0	
Progressive Conservative hold		Swing		+10.71

1996 Prince Edward Island general election
Party	Candidate	Votes	%
Progressive Conservative	Chester Gillan	1,584	57.37
Liberal	Stephen Dowling	1,008	36.51
New Democratic	Larry Duchesne	169	6.12
Total valid votes		2,761	100.0
This district was created from parts of the dual-member riding of 5th Queens.

== Plebiscites ==
2005 Prince Edward Island electoral reform referendum
Side	Votes	%
No	833	52.58
Yes	751	47.41
Total valid votes	1,584	99.75
Rejected votes	4	0.25
Total votes	1,588	51.13
Electors	3,106	
Source "Referendum Statistical Results" (PDF).

== See also ==
- List of Prince Edward Island provincial electoral districts
- Canadian provincial electoral districts
