= Jamie Ballem =

Canadian farmer and politician

Member of the Legislative Assembly of Prince Edward Island for Stanhope-East Royalty
- In office November 18, 1996 – June 12, 2007
- Preceded by: Riding Established
- Succeeded by: Robert Vessey

Personal details
- Born: October 31, 1954 (age 71) Marshfield, Prince Edward Island
- Party: Progressive Conservative

Jamie Ballem (born October 31, 1954) is a Canadian farmer and politician, who served as a cabinet minister, notably as Minister of the Environment and Minister of Health. He was a member of the Legislative Assembly of Prince Edward Island from 1996 to 2007. He represented the electoral district of Stanhope-East Royalty and was a member of the Progressive Conservative Party.

On August 4, 2010, Ballem announced his candidacy for the Leadership of the Progressive Conservative Party of PEI but came in second to Olive Crane.

Born in Marshfield, Prince Edward Island, the son of Cedric and Mrytle Ballem, Ballem was educated at the University of Prince Edward Island. In 1991, he married Cindy MacLean. Ballem served as the chair for the PEI Milk Marketing Board and the Potato Commission. Ballem served in the provincial cabinet as Minister of Environment, Energy and Forestry. He was defeated when he ran for reelection in 2007. Later that year, Ballem started a company called Island Green Power to promote the development of wind power on the island.
