= 1996 Progressive Conservative Party of Prince Edward Island leadership election =

Canadian provincial political party election

2010 Progressive Conservative Party of Prince Edward Island leadership election
- Date: May 4, 1996
- Convention: Charlottetown
- Resigning leader: Pat Mella
- Won by: Pat Binns
- Ballots: 1
- Candidates: 3

The Progressive Conservative Party of Prince Edward Island leadership election of 1996 was held on May 4, 1996, to elect a new leader to succeed Pat Mella.

== Candidates ==
- Pat Binns, former MP for Cardigan
- Wes MacAleer, businessman
- Gary Morgan, doctor

== Results ==
=== First Ballot ===
	First Ballot	
Candidate	Votes	Perc.
Pat Binns	1284	60.17%
Wes MacAleer	527	24.70%
Gary Morgan	323	15.13%
Spoiled Ballots	0	0.00%
Totals	2,134	100%
