= Robert Henderson (Canadian politician) =

Canadian politician

Robert L. Henderson MLA

Member of the Legislative Assembly of Prince Edward Island for O'Leary-Inverness
- Incumbent
- Assumed office June 12, 2007
- Preceded by: Eva Rodgerson

Dean of the Legislative Assembly of Prince Edward Island
- Incumbent
- Assumed office March 26, 2019 Serving with Robert Mitchell (2019–2020); Sonny Gallant (2019–2023)
- Preceded by: Richard Brown

Personal details
- Born: July 21, 1961 (age 65) Freeland, Prince Edward Island, Canada
- Party: Liberal
- Occupation: employment counsellor

Robert Lowell Henderson (born 21 July 1961) is a Canadian politician, who was elected to the Legislative Assembly of Prince Edward Island in the 2007 provincial election. He represents the electoral district of O'Leary-Inverness and is a member of the Liberal Party.

== Biography ==
He is the son of the late former MP George Henderson.

He is currently the longest serving MLA in the province, having first been elected in 2007.

In October 2011, Henderson was appointed to the Executive Council of Prince Edward Island as Minister of Tourism and Culture. Henderson continued to serve as Minister of Tourism when Wade MacLauchlan took over as premier in February 2015, but was left out when MacLauchlan shuffled the cabinet following the 2015 election. On January 7, 2016, Henderson returned to cabinet as Minister of Health and Wellness. On January 10, 2018, Henderson was moved to Minister of Agriculture and Fisheries.

He was re-elected in the 2023 general election. As of September 8, 2024, he serves as Opposition Whip in the Legislature, and is the Opposition critic for Workforce, Agriculture, Justice, Indigenous Affairs, Fisheries, Tourism, and Culture.

== Electoral record ==
2023 Prince Edward Island general election: O'Leary-Inverness
Party	Candidate	Votes	%	±%
Liberal	Robert Henderson	894	37.20	-3.70
Progressive Conservative	Daniel MacDonald	738	30.70	+13.50
New Democratic	Herb Dickieson	702	29.20	-4.10
Green	Richard Lush	72	3	-5.60
Total valid votes		2424		
Total rejected ballots		18	0.74	
Turnout		2,442		
Liberal hold		Swing		-3.70
