= Tracadie-Hillsborough Park =

Former provincial electoral district in Prince Edward Island, Canada

Prince Edward Island electoral district
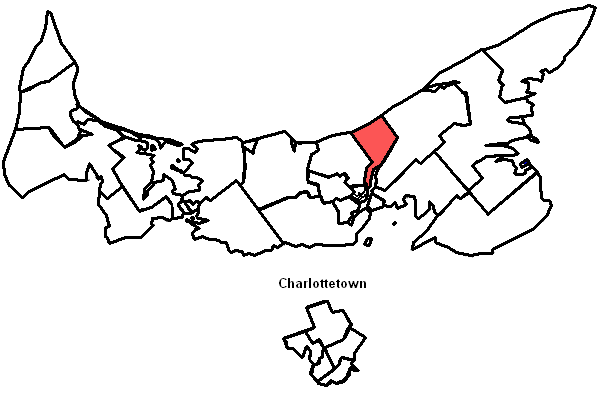
- Coordinates: 46.356°N 62.985°W

Defunct provincial electoral district
- Legislature: Legislative Assembly of Prince Edward Island
- District created: 2007
- District abolished: 2019
- First contested: 2007
- Last contested: 2015

Tracadie-Hillsborough Park is a former provincial electoral district for the Legislative Assembly of Prince Edward Island, Canada.

The district was created in the redistribution that preceded the 2007 Prince Edward Island general election out of parts of Sherwood-Hillsborough, Stanhope-East Royalty, and Tracadie-Fort Augustus.

The district was dissolved in the redistribution that preceded the 2019 Prince Edward Island general election. Its urban portion in Charlottetown was transferred to the new district of Charlottetown-Hillsborough Park, while the rural portion was largely transferred to the district of Stanhope-Marshfield, and a small part transferred to Morell-Donagh.

== Members ==
The riding has elected the following members of the Legislative Assembly:

Members of the Legislative Assembly for Tracadie-Hillsborough Park
Assembly	Years	Member	Party
See Sherwood-Hillsborough, Stanhope-East Royalty and Tracadie-Fort Augustus 1996–2007
63rd	2007–2011	Buck Watts	Liberal
64th	2011–2015	Buck Watts	Liberal
65th	2015–2019	Buck Watts	Liberal
See Charlottetown-Hillsborough Park, Stanhope-Marshfield and Morell-Donagh after 2019

== Election results ==
2015 Prince Edward Island general election
Party	Candidate	Votes	%	±%
Liberal	Buck Watts	1,354	45.65	-2.88
Progressive Conservative	Darren Creamer	826	27.85	-14.43
New Democratic	Jason Murray	549	18.51	+13.45
Green	Isaac Williams	237	7.99	+4.53
Total valid votes		2,966	99.60	
Total rejected ballots		12	0.40	-0.12
Turnout		2,978	76.63	+3.83
Eligible voters		3,886		
Liberal hold		Swing		+5.77

2011 Prince Edward Island general election
Party	Candidate	Votes	%	±%
Liberal	Buck Watts	1,304	48.53	-6.86
Progressive Conservative	Glen Kelly	1,136	42.28	+3.57
New Democratic	Ron Kelly	136	5.06	+2.50
Green	Helene Larouche	93	3.46	+0.12
Island	Gary Chipman	18	0.67	
Total valid votes		2,687	99.48	
Total rejected ballots		14	0.52	+0.24
Turnout		2,701	72.80	-6.50
Eligible voters		3,710		
Liberal hold		Swing		-5.22

2007 Prince Edward Island general election
Party	Candidate	Votes	%
Liberal	Buck Watts	1,577	55.39
Progressive Conservative	Elmer MacFadyen	1,102	38.71
Green	Robert Pendergast	95	3.34
New Democratic	Peter MacFarlane	73	2.56
Total valid votes		2,847	99.72
Total rejected ballots		8	0.28
Turnout		2,855	79.31
Eligible voters		3,600	

=== 2016 electoral reform plebiscite results ===
2016 Prince Edward Island electoral reform referendum
Side	Votes	%
Mixed Member Proportional	429	30.62
First Past the Post	375	26.77
Dual Member Proportional Representation	322	22.98
Preferential Voting	174	12.42
First Past the Post plus leaders	101	7.21
Two-choice preferred result
Mixed Member Proportional	789	59.01
First Past the Post	548	40.99
Total votes cast	1,401	35.65
Registered voters	3,930	
Source "Plebiscite Report" (PDF).

== See also ==
- List of Prince Edward Island provincial electoral districts
- Canadian provincial electoral districts
