= Sonny Gallant =

Canadian politician

Member of the Legislative Assembly of Prince Edward Island for Evangeline-Miscouche
- In office June 12, 2007 – March 6, 2023
- Preceded by: Wilfred Arsenault
- Succeeded by: Gilles Arsenault

Interim Leader of the Prince Edward Island Liberal Party
- In office September 16, 2019 – November 19, 2022
- Preceded by: Robert Mitchell (interim)
- Succeeded by: Sharon Cameron

Dean of the Legislative Assembly of Prince Edward Island
- In office March 26, 2019 – March 6, 2023 Serving with Robert Mitchell (2019–2020); Robert Henderson
- Preceded by: Richard Brown

Personal details
- Born: March 27, 1956 (age 70)
- Party: Liberal

Stanley "Sonny" Gallant (born March 27, 1956) is a Canadian politician who served as interim leader of the Prince Edward Island Liberal Party from 2019 to 2022. He was elected to the Legislative Assembly of Prince Edward Island in the 2007 provincial election. He represented the electoral district of Evangeline-Miscouche from 2007 to 2023 and is a member of the Liberal Party. On February 15, 2017, Gallant was appointed to the Executive Council of Prince Edward Island as Minister of Workforce and Advanced Learning, serving until 2023. He was chosen interim leader of the Liberal Party on September 16, 2019, serving until November 19, 2022.

== Electoral record ==
2019 Prince Edward Island general election: Evangeline-Miscouche
Party	Candidate	Votes	%	±%
Liberal	Sonny Gallant	1,100	44.6%	-17.97
Green	Nick Arsenault	761	30.8%	+25.29
Progressive Conservative	Jason Woodbury	575	23.3%	-2.54
New Democratic	Grant Gallant	33	1.3%	-4.78
Total valid votes				
Liberal hold		Swing		

2015 Prince Edward Island general election
Party	Candidate	Votes	%	±%
Liberal	Sonny Gallant	1,419	62.57	-14.65
Progressive Conservative	Debbie Montgomery	586	25.84	+7.10
New Democratic	Grant Gallant	138	6.08	
Green	Jordan Cameron	125	5.51	+2.64
Total valid votes		2,268	100.0	
Liberal hold		Swing		-10.88

2011 Prince Edward Island general election
Party	Candidate	Votes	%	±%
Liberal	Sonny Gallant	1,722	77.22	+21.41
Progressive Conservative	Edgar Arsenault	418	18.74	-21.06
Green	Melissa Hotte	64	2.87	-1.51
Island	Arthur Arsenault	26	1.17	
Total valid votes		2,230	100.0	
Liberal hold		Swing		+21.24

2007 Prince Edward Island general election
Party	Candidate	Votes	%	±%
Liberal	Sonny Gallant	1,311	55.81	+9.15
Progressive Conservative	Wilfred Arsenault	935	39.80	-10.88
Green	Mannie Gallant	103	4.38	
Total valid votes		2,349	100.0	
Liberal gain from Progressive Conservative		Swing		+10.02
