= Chester Gillan =

Canadian educator and politician

Member of the Legislative Assembly of Prince Edward Island for Parkdale-Belvedere
- In office 18 November 1996 – 28 May 2007
- Preceded by: Riding Established
- Succeeded by: Robert Mitchell

Personal details
- Born: September 25, 1943 (age 82)
- Party: Progressive Conservative Party of Prince Edward Island
- Occupation: Public school teacher (retired); Minister of the Crown (retired); Real Estate Agent

Chester Gillan (born 25 September 1943) is a former Canadian educator and politician from Prince Edward Island.

Born in Charlottetown and educated at Saint Dunstan's University and the University of New Brunswick, Gillan was a high school teacher before entering politics, being elected from 1996 to 2007 as a candidate for the Prince Edward Island Progressive Conservative Party in the electoral district of Parkdale-Belvedere (now Charlottetown-Sherwood) in the Legislative Assembly of Prince Edward Island.

He served as the Minister of Health in the cabinet of then-Premier Pat Binns.
