= Michael Currie (politician) =

Canadian politician

Michael F. Currie

Member of the Legislative Assembly of Prince Edward Island for Georgetown-St. Peters
- In office November 18, 1996 – March 28, 2011
- Preceded by: Riding Established
- Succeeded by: Steven Myers

Personal details
- Born: February 1, 1955 (age 71) Charlottetown, Prince Edward Island
- Party: Progressive Conservative
- Occupation: business manager

Michael F. Currie (born February 1, 1955, in Charlottetown, Prince Edward Island) is a Canadian politician, who served in the Legislative Assembly of Prince Edward Island from 1996 to 2011. He represented the electoral district of Georgetown-St. Peters. He served in the Executive Council of Prince Edward Island as Minister of Transportation and Minister of Industry. Currie resigned his seat in the Legislative Assembly on March 28, 2011, to run as the Conservative candidate for Cardigan, in the 2011 Canadian federal election. On May 2, 2011, Currie was defeated in the federal election by Liberal incumbent Lawrence MacAulay.

In 2012, Currie partnered with the Cardigan Heritage Centre and the local branch of the Legion to initiate the establishment of a community Veteran memorial.
