= Alan McIsaac =

Canadian politician

J. Alan McIsaac

Member of the Legislative Assembly of Prince Edward Island for Vernon River-Stratford
- In office June 12, 2007 – March 26, 2019
- Preceded by: Wilbur MacDonald
- Succeeded by: riding redistributed

Personal details
- Born: March 18, 1954 (age 72)
- Party: Liberal

Joseph Alan McIsaac (born 18 March 1954) is a Canadian politician, who represented the electoral district of Vernon River-Stratford in the Legislative Assembly of Prince Edward Island as a member of the Liberal Party from 2007 to 2019.

McIsaac was elected to the Legislature of Prince Edward Island in the 2007 provincial election. He was re-elected in the 2011 election, and was appointed to the Executive Council of Prince Edward Island as Minister of Education and Early Childhood Development, and Minister of Justice and Public safety and Attorney General. He ran for re-election in 2015 and was tied with Progressive Conservative challenger Mary Ellen McInnis, winning only after a coin toss went in his favour. Following the election, McIsaac was moved to Minister of Agriculture and Fisheries. In June 2015, McIsaac was given an additional role as Government House Leader. McIsaac was dropped from cabinet on January 10, 2018, after announcing that he would not run in the next election.

He has served as chair of the Standing Committee on Agriculture, Environment, Energy and Forestry, and was a member of the Treasury Board. He has been a member of the Standing Committee on Fisheries, Transportation and Rural Development, the Standing Committee on Public Accounts, and the Standing Committee on Education and Innovation.

McIsaac is a dairy farmer and small business operator. He has held many leadership roles in the dairy industry at the provincial, regional, and national levels over the past 32 years, including chairing the Provincial Milk Marketing Board and as the Atlantic Canada Director on the Board of Holstein Canada. He also served on the Executive of the P.E.I. Federation of Agriculture.

He did not run for reelection in the 2019 Prince Edward Island general election.
