= Robert Vessey (Canadian politician) =

Canadian politician (born 1961)

Member of the Legislative Assembly of Prince Edward Island for York-Oyster Bed
- In office June 12, 2007 – February 23, 2015
- Preceded by: Jamie Ballem
- Succeeded by: Wade MacLauchlan

Personal details
- Born: November 27, 1961 (age 64) York, Prince Edward Island, Canada
- Party: Liberal

Robert Vessey (born 27 November 1961) is a Canadian politician. He was elected to the Legislative Assembly of Prince Edward Island in the 2007 provincial election and represented the electoral district of York-Oyster Bed as a member of the Liberal Party until 2015.

Vessey was previously the Liberal candidate in Stanhope-East Royalty in the 2003 election.

In June 2007, Vessey was named Government House Leader. In January 2010, Vessey was appointed to the Executive Council of Prince Edward Island as Minister of Tourism. Following his re-election in the 2011 election, Vessey was moved to Minister of Transportation and Infrastructure Renewal.

On February 20, 2015, Vessey announced that he would resign his seat in the legislature to take a position as chief of staff to Wade MacLauchlan upon MacLauchlan's appointment and swearing-in as Premier of Prince Edward Island on February 23. His resignation opened a seat for MacLauchlan, who was not a sitting member of the legislature at that time, to run for the seat in the election in May 2015. MacLauchlan won the seat in the 2015 general election on May 4.
