= Wade MacLauchlan =

Canadian politician (born 1954)

The Honourable Wade MacLauchlan CM OPEI
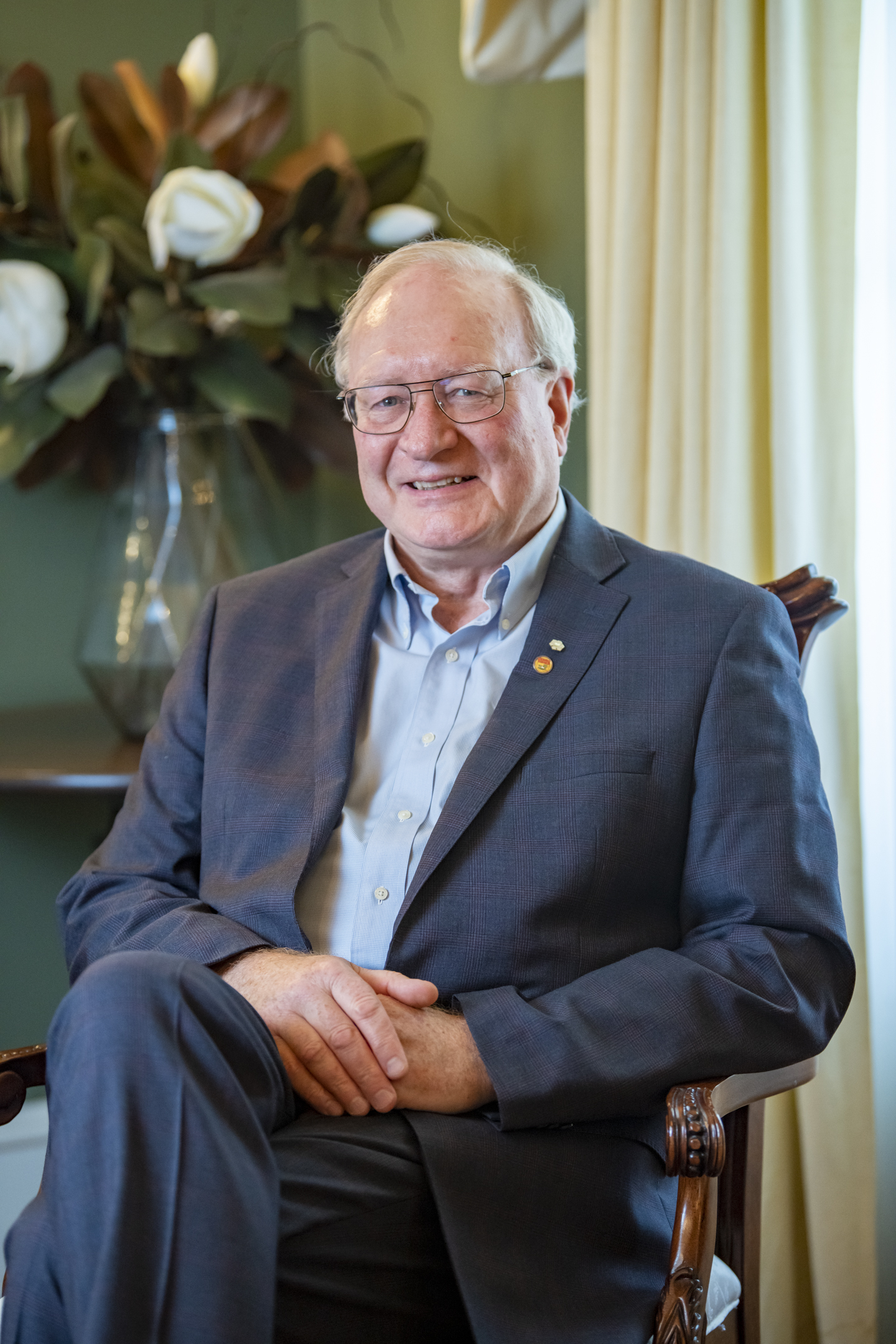
- MacLauchlan in 2023

32nd Premier of Prince Edward Island
- In office 23 February 2015 – 9 May 2019
- Monarch: Elizabeth II
- Lieutenant Governor: Frank Lewis; Antoinette Perry
- Deputy: George T. Webster (2015)
- Preceded by: Robert Ghiz
- Succeeded by: Dennis King

Member of the Legislative Assembly of Prince Edward Island for York-Oyster Bed
- In office 4 May 2015 – 26 March 2019
- Preceded by: Robert Vessey
- Succeeded by: electoral district abolished

Leader of the Prince Edward Island Liberal Party
- In office 21 February 2015 – 8 May 2019
- Preceded by: Robert Ghiz
- Succeeded by: Robert Mitchell (interim)

Personal details
- Born: 10 December 1954 (age 71) Stanhope, Prince Edward Island, Canada
- Party: Liberal Party
- Domestic partner: Duncan McIntosh
- Education: University of Prince Edward Island (BBA) University of New Brunswick (LLB) Yale University (LLM)
- Occupation: Academic, politician, writer

H. Wade MacLauchlan CM OPEI (born 10 December 1954), is a Canadian academic administrator and former politician who served as the 32nd premier of Prince Edward Island and leader of the Prince Edward Island Liberal Party from 2015 to 2019. He also served as the fifth president of the University of Prince Edward Island from 1999 to 2011, and has been the seventh modern chancellor of the University of New Brunswick since 2023.

== Early life, education and career ==
Wade MacLauchlan was born on 10 December 1954 in Stanhope, Prince Edward Island, as the third of five children of Harry and Marjorie MacLauchlan. He went on to earn an undergraduate Bachelor of Business Administration degree from the University of Prince Edward Island, followed by a Bachelor of Laws from the University of New Brunswick and a Master of Laws from Yale University.

== Academic career ==
In the year following graduation from University of New Brunswick Faculty of Law, MacLauchlan was awarded a clerkship at the Supreme Court of Canada, where he was the sole law clerk for Justice Willard Estey.

MacLauchlan began his teaching and academic career as an assistant professor, later promoted to associate professor, at Dalhousie Law School from 1983 to 1991. During this time, he served for six years as director of the federal government's Civil Law-Common Law Exchange Program. MacLauchlan was active in the Canadian Association of Law Teachers, including as chair of a Special Advisory Committee on Equality in Legal Education. His main teaching and scholarly focus was in administrative and public law. From 1990 to 1993, he was the administrative law editor of the Supreme Court Law Review. He was also Dean of Law at the University of New Brunswick from 1991 to 1996.

In 1999, MacLauchlan was appointed as the fifth president of the University of Prince Edward Island, the first provincial native to serve in the role. In the fall of 2010, MacLauchlan led vocal opposition to an initiative by the PEI government that proposed to amend the University Act to permit the creation of additional university-status institutions in the province, specifically to permit developer Richard Homburg to create a degree-granting real estate university. The provincial government decided against proceeding with the controversial changes. MacLauchlan served a number of years as an executive member of the Association of Universities and Colleges of Canada (AUCC) and as a member and chair of AUCC's Standing Advisory Committee on International Relations. As UPEI president, MacLauchlan served as a member of the Executive of the Association of Atlantic Universities including twice as chair of the AAU. He served on the board of Atlantic University Sport, including five years as chair.

After completing his 12-year term as UPEI's longest-serving president, MacLauchlan retired from the university at the end of 2011 and was named president emeritus.

=== Later career ===
In November 2012, MacLauchlan was elected as a councillor of the rural Municipality of North Shore. He was re-elected by acclamation in November 2014. From 2013 to 2015, MacLauchlan served as a board member of the Federation of Municipalities of Prince Edward Island.

From 2008 to 2015, MacLauchlan served as a director of Medavie Inc. and Medavie Health Services.

== Premier of Prince Edward Island ==
On 13 November 2014, Liberal premier Robert Ghiz announced that he would resign upon the selection of a new Liberal leader. Two weeks later, MacLauchlan was joined at the North Shore Community Centre in his home community by 19 of 23 Liberal caucus members for the announcement that he would be a candidate for the party leadership. He was the sole candidate at the close of nominations on 20 January 2015, and was acclaimed leader on 21 February 2015.

MacLauchlan was sworn in as the 32nd Premier of Prince Edward Island, on 23 February 2015. In addition to serving as premier, MacLauchlan assumed the roles of Minister of Finance and Energy, as well as Minister of Intergovernmental, Aboriginal and Francophone Affairs in an eight-member cabinet.

MacLauchlan led the Liberals to a majority in a 4 May, 2015 general election, winning 18 of 27 seats in the Legislative Assembly. MacLauchlan was elected as MLA for York-Oyster Bed, a seat previously held by his chief of staff Robert Vessey.

The new cabinet saw a mix of seasoned and first-time ministers, with MacLauchlan taking on the role of minister of justice and attorney general in the place of the finance portfolio. The Legislature met for a June sitting, which included the adoption of the 2015–16 provincial budget and tabling of a white paper on democratic renewal. One of the first acts of the new government, prior to the legislative sitting, was to announce that PEI would fund abortions on a self-referral basis through an agreement with Moncton Hospital. In March 2016, the government announced, in response to a constitutional challenge, the creation of a self-referring Women's Health Centre that would offer abortions in the province for the first time in decades, along with a range of reproductive health services.

An early challenge for the MacLauchlan government was the need to install new power transmission cables under the Northumberland Strait between New Brunswick and PEI, to expand the capacity of existing 40 year-old cables and address concerns about their age and condition. After the 2015 federal election, the federal Liberal government agreed to share the cost. The project was completed in August 2017.

On the recommendation of an all-party legislative committee, the electoral reform plebiscite offered Islanders five choices through a preferential voting or ranked-ballot system. After four rounds, the majority of votes (52.4%) were cast in favour of mixed member proportional representation [MMP]. Because participation in the plebiscite was very low at 36.46%, the MacLauchlan government introduced legislation to have the matter settled through a yes-or-no referendum on MMP to be held in conjunction with the 2019 provincial election. While the referendum eventually went against MMP, the process "turned what was a dormant issue into a lightning rod of general public frustration." In the fall of 2016 and winter of 2017, a periodic review of school zoning and populations by the PEI Public Schools Branch attracted considerable public opposition to the proposed closure of five schools. At the conclusion of the process, the trustees recommended to cabinet that two of the five schools be closed but the government opted to keep the schools open.

Some of the major initiatives of the MacLauchlan government included passage of PEI's first-ever Water Act, and a new Municipal Government Act replacing legislation first adopted in 1947. A new Business Corporations Act and registry replaced a Companies Act with origins in the 1880s. The province undertook its first comprehensive review of policing in decades, and a new Education Act replaced legislation from the early 1970s. In the area of open government, Prince Edward Island adopted its first-ever whistle-blower protection legislation, a lobbyist registry and the modernization of limits on political contributions.

MacLauchlan's Liberals trailed in the polls going in to the 2019 provincial election. The election resulted in PEI's first minority government in more than a century. The Progressive Conservatives captured 12 seats (later 13, with the results of the deferred election) and 37% of the vote, the Greens 8 seats and 31%, and the Liberals 6 seats and 30%. MacLauchlan lost by 104 votes in his district of Stanhope-Marshfield and announced two days later that he would step down as Liberal party leader upon selection of an interim leader.

== Chancellorship at the University of New Brunswick ==
In 2023, MacLauchlan was appointed the seventh modern Chancellor of the University of New Brunswick (UNB), succeeding Allison McCain at the conclusion of his second five-year term. He was officially installed during UNB Fredericton’s Fall Convocation on October 19, 2023.

== Personal life ==
MacLauchlan was the first openly gay Premier of Prince Edward Island, and the first openly gay man to be premier of a province. He lives with his partner, theatrical director and entrepreneur Duncan McIntosh.

== Honours and awards ==
MacLauchlan was the first person in Canada to be a member of the Order of Canada prior to leading a government, having been inducted as a member of Order in 2008. In 2014, he was named to the Order of Prince Edward Island. In 2010, he received the Lieutenant Governor's Institute of Public Administration of Canada Award for Excellence in Public Administration. In 2013, MacLauchlan was an inaugural recipient of the Frank McKenna Award for outstanding contributions to public policy by Atlantic Canadians conferred by the Public Policy Forum of Canada.

MacLauchlan is a recipient of all three Queen Elizabeth II Jubilee Medals: The Golden Jubilee Medal (2002), The Diamond Jubilee Medal (2012), and The Platinum Jubilee Medal (2022). In May 2025, MacLauchlan was awarded the King Charles III Coronation Medal, a commemorative honour recognizing Canadians who have made significant contributions to their communities or to the nation.

== See also ==
- List of openly LGBT heads of government
- List of the first LGBT holders of political offices in Canada
