= Doug Currie =

Canadian politician

Douglas W. Currie

Member of the Legislative Assembly of Prince Edward Island for Charlottetown-Parkdale
- In office June 12, 2007 – October 19, 2017
- Preceded by: Elmer MacFadyen
- Succeeded by: Hannah Bell

Personal details
- Born: June 25, 1961 (age 65) Charlottetown, Prince Edward Island
- Party: Conservative (2021–present)
- Other political affiliations: Liberal (2007–2017)
- Occupation: Educator, Hockey Coach

Douglas W. Currie (born 25 June 1961) is a Canadian politician who represented the electoral district of Charlottetown-Parkdale in the Legislative Assembly of Prince Edward Island as a member of the Liberal Party from 2007 until his resignation in 2017.

== Background ==
Born in Charlottetown, Prince Edward Island, Currie grew up in District 11 Charlottetown-Parkdale where he currently lives with his two daughters. He holds a BA and BEd degree from the University of Prince Edward Island and a M.Ed. from the University of New Brunswick. Currie was a school teacher and principal of Birchwood Intermediate School. He served as Head Coach and Director of Hockey Operations for the University of Prince Edward Island.

== Political career ==
In May 2007, Currie served as Minister of Health, Social Services and Seniors. He represented Provincial and Territorial Ministries of Health in 2008 as part of the Canadian delegation to the World Health Organization Forum in Geneva, Switzerland. As Health Minister Currie helped establish the Integrated Health System Project, which focused on operational improvements and service realignment to improve health services for Islanders. The government's vision of One Island Future – One Island Health System guided this project.

From January 2010 to Fall 2011 Currie served as Minister of Education and Early Childhood Development and Attorney General. During this time, Currie implemented the Public Education Governance Review for the Province of Prince Edward Island and was the driving force behind several key changes to Prince Edward Island's education system.

In October 2011, Currie was appointed Minister of Health and Wellness and Minister Responsible for Sport and Recreation. Currie led the renewal and implementation of the Mental Health and Addictions Strategy, the creation of Health PEI, and the transformation of the provincial health care system.

In February 2015, Currie was appointed Minister of Health and Wellness, Minister Responsible for Sport and Recreation and Minister Responsible for Municipal Affairs. In May 2015, he was appointed Minister of Health and Wellness, Minister Responsible for Sport and Recreation and Minister of Family and Human Services.

On January 7, 2016, Currie was appointed Minister of Education, Early Learning and Culture. He resigned from the legislature on October 19, 2017.

On January 22, 2021, Currie was acclaimed as candidate for the Conservative Party in the riding of Charlottetown.

On July 31, 2024, Currie announced that he would again seek the Conservative Party nomination in the riding of Charlottetown for the next federal election. On January 15, 2025, CBC News reported that the party had ruled Currie ineligible to run, citing what the party described as “serious misrepresentations and violations” of its rules. In a statement to CBC News, the party said Currie had given contradictory answers on his nomination questionnaire, that the party had found “troubling evidence of inappropriate behaviour,” and that he had not disclosed an ongoing lawsuit, all of which contributed to the decision to bar him from the nomination.

== Electoral record ==
=== Federal elections ===
2021 Canadian federal election: Charlottetown
Party	Candidate	Votes	%	±%	Expenditures
Liberal	Sean Casey	8,919	46.70	+2.44	$72,839.73
Conservative	Doug Currie	5,932	31.06	+10.77	$77,864.04
New Democratic	Margaret Andrade	2,048	10.72	-0.52	$3,242.50
Green	Darcie Lanthier	1,832	9.59	-13.75	none listed
People's	Scott McPhee	369	1.93	–	$0.00
Total valid votes/expense limit		19,100	98.97		$88,991.90
Total rejected ballots		198	1.03	-0.33	
Turnout		19,298	70.47	-2.34	
Eligible voters		27,383			
Liberal hold		Swing		-4.16	
Source: Elections Canada

=== Provincial elections ===
2015 Prince Edward Island general election
Party	Candidate	Votes	%	±%
Liberal	Doug Currie	1,166	43.70	-18.06
Progressive Conservative	Lynn MacLaren	699	26.20	-1.00
Green	Becka Viau	511	19.15	+12.93
New Democratic	Andrew Watts	292	10.94	+6.11
Total valid votes		2,668	100.0	
Liberal hold		Swing		-8.53

2011 Prince Edward Island general election
Party	Candidate	Votes	%	±%
Liberal	Doug Currie	1,510	61.76	+4.33
Progressive Conservative	Bernie Flynn	665	27.20	-10.75
Green	Eliza Knockwood	152	6.22	
New Democratic	Noel Pauley	118	4.83	+0.21
Total valid votes		2,445	100.0	
Liberal hold		Swing		+7.54

2007 Prince Edward Island general election
Party	Candidate	Votes	%
Liberal	Doug Currie	1,666	57.43
Progressive Conservative	Mike Molyneaux	1,101	37.95
New Democratic	Zain Esseghaier	134	4.62
Total valid votes		2,901	100.0
This was a newly created district
