= Pat Murphy (Canadian politician) =

Canadian politician (1962–2025)

Patrick W. Murphy

Minister of Rural and Regional Development
- In office February 2017 – April 23, 2019

Member of the Legislative Assembly of Prince Edward Island for Alberton-Roseville
- In office June 12, 2007 – April 23, 2019
- Preceded by: Cletus Dunn
- Succeeded by: Ernie Hudson

Mayor of Alberton
- In office January 2004 – December 2006

Alberton Town Councillor
- In office 2001–2003

Personal details
- Born: June 6, 1962 Alberton, Prince Edward Island, Canada
- Died: March 20, 2025 (aged 62) Alberton, Prince Edward Island, Canada
- Party: Liberal
- Occupation: business owner, mayor

Patrick William Murphy (June 6, 1962 – March 20, 2025) was a Canadian politician, who represented the electoral district of Alberton-Roseville in the Legislative Assembly of Prince Edward Island from 2007 to 2019.

== Life and career ==
Murphy was born on June 6, 1962. A member of the Liberal Party, he was first elected in the 2007 Prince Edward Island general election. On February 15, 2017, Murphy was appointed to the Executive Council of Prince Edward Island as Minister of Rural and Regional Development.

In the 2019 Prince Edward Island general election, he was defeated by Ernie Hudson in the redistributed riding of Alberton-Bloomfield.

Murphy owned and operated the Irving service station in Alberton. He was mayor of Alberton from January 2004 to December 2006 and a town councillor from 2001 until 2003.

Murphy died at his home in Alberton, on March 20, 2025, at the age of 62.
