= Buck Watts =

Canadian politician

Francis D. "Buck" Watts

31st Speaker of the Legislative Assembly of Prince Edward Island
- In office June 3, 2015 – March 26, 2019
- Preceded by: Carolyn Bertram
- Succeeded by: Colin LaVie

Member of the Legislative Assembly of Prince Edward Island for Tracadie-Hillsborough Park
- In office June 12, 2007 – March 26, 2019
- Preceded by: Mildred Dover
- Succeeded by: District abolished

Personal details
- Born: November 9, 1944 (age 81) Grand Tracadie, Prince Edward Island
- Party: Liberal
- Occupation: fisherman, businessman

Francis Daniel "Buck" Watts (born 9 November 1944) is a Canadian politician serving as the Speaker of the Legislative Assembly of Prince Edward Island.

He was elected to the Legislative Assembly of Prince Edward Island in the 2007 provincial election, and represented the electoral district of Tracadie-Hillsborough Park and is a member of the Liberal Party until 2019.

On June 3, 2015, Watts was elected through a secret ballot after two rounds, as Speaker of the Legislative Assembly.
