= York-Oyster Bed =

Former provincial electoral district in Prince Edward Island, Canada

Prince Edward Island electoral district
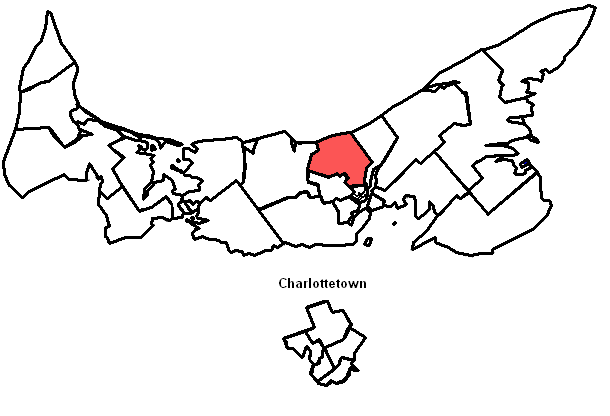
- Coordinates: 46.334°N 63.098°W

Defunct provincial electoral district
- Legislature: Legislative Assembly of Prince Edward Island
- District created: 1996
- District abolished: 2019
- First contested: 1996
- Last contested: 2015

York-Oyster Bed is a former provincial electoral district for the Legislative Assembly of Prince Edward Island, Canada, which was represented from 2007 to 2019. The district was named Stanhope-East Royalty from 1996 until 2007.

== Members ==
The riding has elected the following members of the Legislative Assembly:

Members of the Legislative Assembly for York-Oyster Bed
Assembly	Years	Member	Party
See 2nd Queens, 3rd Queens, and 5th Queens 1873–1996
60th	1996–2000	Jamie Ballem	Progressive Conservative
61st	2000–2003	Jamie Ballem	Progressive Conservative
62nd	2003–2007	Jamie Ballem	Progressive Conservative
63rd	2007–2011	Robert Vessey	Liberal
64th	2011–2015	Robert Vessey	Liberal
65th	2015–2019	Wade MacLauchlan	Liberal

== Election results ==
=== York-Oyster Bed, 2007–2019 ===
2015 Prince Edward Island general election
Party	Candidate	Votes	%	±%
Liberal	Wade MacLauchlan	1,938	47.68	-7.62
Progressive Conservative	Jim "Benson" Carragher	1,338	32.92	-1.44
New Democratic	Gordon Gay	442	10.87	+3.92
Green	Thane Bernard	347	8.54	+5.14
Total valid votes		4,065	99.85	
Total rejected ballots		6	0.15	-0.24
Turnout		4,071	81.10	+1.55
Eligible voters		5,020		
Liberal hold		Swing		-3.09

2011 Prince Edward Island general election
Party	Candidate	Votes	%	±%
Liberal	Robert Vessey	1,988	55.30	-0.07
Progressive Conservative	Martie Murphy	1,235	34.35	-5.02
New Democratic	James Rodd	250	6.95	+5.24
Green	Jenet Clement	122	3.39	-0.15
Total valid votes		3,595	99.61	
Total rejected ballots		14	0.39	+0.02
Turnout		3,609	79.55	-9.20
Eligible voters		4,537		
Liberal hold		Swing		+2.48

2007 Prince Edward Island general election
Party	Candidate	Votes	%
Liberal	Robert Vessey	1,970	55.37
Progressive Conservative	Jamie Ballem	1,401	39.38
Green	Joan Cullen	126	3.54
New Democratic	James Rodd	61	1.71
Total valid votes		3,558	99.64
Total rejected ballots		13	0.36
Turnout		3,571	88.74
Eligible voters		4,024	
Liberal pickup new district.			

=== Stanhope-East Royalty, 1996–2007 ===
2003 Prince Edward Island general election
Party	Candidate	Votes	%	±%
Progressive Conservative	Jamie Ballem	1,858	55.70	-5.28
Liberal	Robert Vessey	1,400	41.97	+8.91
New Democratic	Gerard Gallant	78	2.34	-3.63
Total valid votes		3,336	99.79	
Total rejected ballots		7	0.21	-0.22
Turnout		3,343	83.62	-2.75
Eligible voters		3,998		
Progressive Conservative hold		Swing		-7.09

2000 Prince Edward Island general election
Party	Candidate	Votes	%	±%
Progressive Conservative	Jamie Ballem	1,992	60.97	+10.10
Liberal	Eddie Reardon	1,080	33.06	-10.90
New Democratic	Leo Cheverie	195	5.97	+0.80
Total valid votes		3,267	99.57	
Total rejected ballots		14	0.43	+0.18
Turnout		3,281	86.36	+0.10
Eligible voters		3,799		
Progressive Conservative hold		Swing		+10.50

1996 Prince Edward Island general election
Party	Candidate	Votes	%
Progressive Conservative	Jamie Ballem	1,625	50.88
Liberal	Eddie Reardon	1,404	43.96
New Democratic	Leo Cheverie	165	5.17
Total valid votes		3,194	99.75
Total rejected ballots		8	0.25
Turnout		3,202	86.26
Eligible voters		3,712	
This district was created from parts of the dual-member ridings of 2nd Queens, 3rd Queens and 5th Queens.

=== 2016 electoral reform plebiscite results ===
2016 Prince Edward Island electoral reform referendum
Side	Votes	%
Mixed Member Proportional	583	29.44
First Past the Post	575	29.04
Dual Member Proportional Representation	412	20.81
Preferential Voting	248	12.53
First Past the Post plus leaders	162	8.18
Two-choice preferred result
Mixed Member Proportional	1,086	57.13
First Past the Post	815	42.87
Total votes cast	1,980	38.47
Registered voters	5,147	
Source "Plebiscite Report" (PDF). Archived from the original (PDF) on 1 December 2017.

== See also ==
- List of Prince Edward Island provincial electoral districts
- Canadian provincial electoral districts
