= Charlottetown-Parkdale =

Former provincial electoral district in Prince Edward Island, Canada

Prince Edward Island electoral district
- Coordinates: 46.255°N 63.118°W

Defunct provincial electoral district
- Legislature: Legislative Assembly of Prince Edward Island
- District created: 2007
- District abolished: 2019
- First contested: 2007
- Last contested: 2017 (by-election)

Demographics
- Census division: Queens County
- Census subdivision: Charlottetown

Charlottetown-Parkdale was a provincial electoral district for the Legislative Assembly of Prince Edward Island, Canada. It was created prior to the 2007 election from parts of Sherwood-Hillsborough, Parkdale-Belvedere, and Charlottetown-Kings Square.

The riding consisted of most of the Parkdale neighbourhood and the St. Avard's and Belvedere neighbourhoods of Charlottetown.

== Members ==
The riding has elected the following members of the Legislative Assembly:

Members of the Legislative Assembly for Charlottetown-Parkdale
| Assembly | Years | Member | Party |
|---|---|---|---|
See Sherwood-Hillsborough, Parkdale-Belvedere and Charlottetown-Kings Square 1996–2007
| 63rd | 2007–2011 | Doug Currie | Liberal |
| 64th | 2011–2015 | Doug Currie | Liberal |
| 65th | 2015–2017 | Doug Currie | Liberal |
| 65th | 2017–2019 | Hannah Bell | Green |

== Election results ==
=== Charlottetown-Parkdale, 2007–2019 ===
Prince Edward Island provincial by-election, 27 November 2017 Resignation of Doug Currie
| Party | Candidate | Votes | % | ±% |
|---|---|---|---|---|
| Green | Hannah Bell | 768 | 35.28 | +16.12 |
| Liberal | Bob Doiron | 621 | 28.53 | -15.18 |
| Progressive Conservative | Melissa Hilton | 586 | 26.92 | +0.72 |
| New Democratic | Michael Redmond | 202 | 9.28 | -1.67 |
| Total valid votes | | 2,177 | 100.00 | |
| Green gain from Liberal | | Swing | | +15.65 |

2015 Prince Edward Island general election
| Party | Candidate | Votes | % | ±% |
|---|---|---|---|---|
| Liberal | Doug Currie | 1,166 | 43.70 | -18.06 |
| Progressive Conservative | Lynn MacLaren | 699 | 26.20 | -1.00 |
| Green | Becka Viau | 511 | 19.15 | +12.93 |
| New Democratic | Andrew Watts | 292 | 10.94 | +6.11 |
| Total valid votes | | 2,668 | 100.0 | |
| Liberal hold | | Swing | | -8.53 |

2011 Prince Edward Island general election
| Party | Candidate | Votes | % | ±% |
|---|---|---|---|---|
| Liberal | Doug Currie | 1,510 | 61.76 | +4.33 |
| Progressive Conservative | Bernie Flynn | 665 | 27.20 | -10.75 |
| Green | Eliza Knockwood | 152 | 6.22 | |
| New Democratic | Noel Pauley | 118 | 4.83 | +0.21 |
| Total valid votes | | 2,445 | 100.0 | |
| Liberal hold | | Swing | | +7.54 |

2007 Prince Edward Island general election
| Party | Candidate | Votes | % |
|---|---|---|---|
| Liberal | Doug Currie | 1,666 | 57.43 |
| Progressive Conservative | Mike Molyneaux | 1,101 | 37.95 |
| New Democratic | Zain Esseghaier | 134 | 4.62 |
| Total valid votes | | 2,901 | 100.0 |
This was a newly created district

=== 2016 electoral reform plebiscite results ===
2016 Prince Edward Island electoral reform referendum
| Side | Votes | % |
|---|---|---|
| Mixed Member Proportional | 422 | 31.01 |
| Dual Member Proportional Representation | 395 | 29.02 |
| First Past the Post | 354 | 26.01 |
| Preferential Voting | 124 | 9.11 |
| First Past the Post plus leaders | 66 | 4.85 |
Two-choice preferred result
| Mixed Member Proportional | 568 | 52.35 |
| Dual Member Proportional Representation | 517 | 47.65 |
| Total votes cast | 1,361 | 39.56 |
| Registered voters | 3,439 | |
Source "Plebiscite Report" (PDF).

== See also ==
- List of Prince Edward Island provincial electoral districts
- Canadian provincial electoral districts
