= Bush Dumville =

Canadian politician (born 1945)

Member of the Legislative Assembly of Prince Edward Island for West Royalty-Springvale
- In office June 12, 2007 – March 26, 2019
- Preceded by: Wayne Collins
- Succeeded by: riding redistributed

Personal details
- Born: Stanley Forrest Dumville; January 6, 1945 (age 81) Summerside, Prince Edward Island, Canada
- Party: Independent
- Other political affiliations: Liberal (2007–2018)

Stanley Forrest "Bush" Dumville (born January 6, 1945) is a Canadian politician, who represented the electoral district of West Royalty-Springvale in the Legislative Assembly of Prince Edward Island from 2007 to 2019.

== Career ==
First elected in the 2007 Prince Edward Island general election as a member of the Prince Edward Island Liberal Party, he left the party to sit as an independent on January 31, 2018. He ran for reelection in the 2019 Prince Edward Island general election in the redistributed riding of Charlottetown-West Royalty, but was defeated by Liberal Gord McNeilly.

Prior to entering politics, Dumville was a member of the Royal Canadian Mounted Police, serving in Newfoundland, New Brunswick and Ontario, and then a businessman, who owned and operated two Burger King franchises, one in Charlottetown and the second in Summerside.
