= Kathleen Casey =

Canadian politician

Kathleen M. Casey

29th Speaker of the Legislative Assembly of Prince Edward Island
- In office July 6, 2007 – November 1, 2011
- Preceded by: Greg Deighan
- Succeeded by: Carolyn Bertram

Member of the Legislative Assembly of Prince Edward Island for Charlottetown-Lewis Point
- In office June 12, 2007 – March 26, 2019
- Preceded by: Wes MacAleer
- Succeeded by: riding redistributed

Personal details
- Born: November 13, 1961 (age 64) New Waterford, Nova Scotia
- Party: Liberal

Kathleen Marie Casey (born 13 November 1961) is a Canadian politician. Casey was elected to the Legislative Assembly of Prince Edward Island in the 2007 provincial election, and represented the electoral district of Charlottetown-Lewis Point as a member of the Liberal Party until retiring at the 2019 Prince Edward Island general election. She served as Speaker of the Legislative Assembly from 2007 to 2011.

== Biography ==
A native of New Waterford, Nova Scotia, she received a BSc from Saint Francis Xavier University in Physical Education. Casey moved to West Royalty, Prince Edward Island in 1986 to become recreation director for the community. In 1995, she was hired as Superintendent of Parks for Charlottetown. She served on the Charlottetown City Council from 1997 to 2003. From 1988 to 2022, Casey was married to Sean Casey, a former president of the PEI Liberal Party, who was elected as the federal Member of Parliament for Charlottetown in the 2011 Canadian federal election.
