= Paula Biggar =

Canadian politician

Paula J. Biggar

Member of the Legislative Assembly of Prince Edward Island for Tyne Valley-Linkletter
- In office June 12, 2007 – March 26, 2019
- Preceded by: Philip Brown
- Succeeded by: riding redistributed

Personal details
- Born: May 9, 1955 (age 70)
- Party: Liberal

Paula Jean Biggar (born 9 May 1955) is a Canadian politician.

She was elected to the Legislative Assembly of Prince Edward Island in the 2007 provincial election. She represented the electoral district of Tyne Valley-Linkletter and is a member of the Liberal Party until she was defeated in the 2019 Prince Edward Island general election. She previously held the title of "Deputy Speaker" of the House.

A native of Prince County, Biggar received a diploma in Public Administration from the University of Prince Edward Island and was an educational assistant and municipal councillor prior to being elected. She lives in Bideford.

On May 20, 2015, Biggar was appointed to the Executive Council of Prince Edward Island as Minister of Transportation, Infrastructure and Energy. She was given an additional role as Minister responsible for the Status of Women when Tina Mundy resigned from cabinet the following day.
