= Richard Brown (Canadian politician) =

Canadian politician (born 1956)

Richard E. Brown

Member of the Legislative Assembly of Prince Edward Island for Charlottetown-Victoria Park Charlottetown-Kings Square (1997–2000, 2003–2007)
- In office September 29, 2003 – March 26, 2019
- Preceded by: Bob MacMillan
- Succeeded by: Karla Bernard
- In office November 17, 1997 – April 17, 2000
- Preceded by: Wayne Cheverie
- Succeeded by: Bob MacMillan

Personal details
- Born: September 10, 1956 (age 70) Charlottetown, Prince Edward Island, Canada
- Party: Liberal

Richard Earle Brown is a Canadian politician, who was elected to the Legislative Assembly of Prince Edward Island in the 2007 provincial election. He represented the electoral district of Charlottetown-Victoria Park as a member of the Liberal Party. His brother Philip Brown, is the current and 46th Mayor of Charlottetown.

He was first elected to the Legislative Assembly in a 1997 by-election, following the resignation of Wayne Cheverie. He was subsequently defeated by Bob MacMillan in the 2000 provincial election, but defeated MacMillan when he ran again in the 2003 election.

In June 2007, Brown was appointed to the Executive Council of Prince Edward Island as Minister of Development and Technology. In April 2008, he became Minister of Innovation and Advanced Learning. In January 2009, Brown was moved to Minister of Environment, Energy and Forestry. Brown was dropped from cabinet following the 2011 election. On May 20, 2015, Brown returned to cabinet as Minister of Workforce and Advanced Learning. He resigned from cabinet on February 15, 2017. On January 10, 2018, Brown returned to cabinet as Minister of Communities, Land and Environment. He was defeated when he ran for re-election in 2019.
