= 2019 Prince Edward Island electoral reform referendum =

Canadian provincial referendum

Electoral System Referendum
- April 23, 2019
- Should Prince Edward Island change its voting system to a mixed member proportional voting system?
- Website: referendumpei.ca

Results
Choice	Votes	%
Yes	39,516	48.26%
No	42,372	51.74%
Valid votes	81,888	100.00%
Invalid or blank votes	0	0.00%
Total votes	81,888	100.00%
Registered voters/turnout	107,109	76.45%
- Results by district

A referendum on electoral reform was held on April 23, 2019, in the Canadian province of Prince Edward Island – simultaneously with the 2019 provincial election – to determine if the province should adopt a mixed-member proportional representation voting system (MMP). A narrow majority voted to keep the existing first-past-the-post system. However, the referendum was not binding, as neither the yes or no side received majority support in 60% or more of the province's 27 electoral districts.

== Background ==
A referendum on electoral reform had been held in 2005. Another referendum on the issue had been held October 27 to November 7, 2016. That referendum had asked which of five voting systems residents would prefer to use in electing members to the Legislative Assembly of Prince Edward Island. The 2016 referendum, after four rounds of counting, had indicated that mixed member proportional representation was the preferred choice with over 52% support on the final ballot.

Premier Wade MacLauchlan said after the vote that he was doubtful the result of the referendum "can be said to constitute a clear expression of the will of Prince Edward Islanders" due to the low voter turnout relative to provincial general elections. As the result of political pressure, MacLauchlan's government introduced a motion in the Legislative Assembly of Prince Edward Island to hold another referendum on electoral reform at the next provincial general election, stating that the low turnout for the referendum did not provide a mandate to implement the change and the need for a more specific referendum question with two choices. A motion by Green Party leader Peter Bevan-Baker to implement mixed-member proportional representation in line with the referendum results was defeated on November 22, 2016, by a vote of 6–20.

On June 12, 2018, legislation governing the new referendum passed in the legislature.

== Referendum question and threshold ==
The Electoral System Referendum Act passed by the Legislative Assembly of Prince Edward Island on June 13, 2018, set the referendum question as:

Should Prince Edward Island change its voting system to a mixed member proportional voting system?

- No
- Yes

(According to the Act, "No" was required to appear on the referendum ballot above "Yes")

In order for the referendum to be legally binding, either side was required to receive a majority of voters in at least 60% (17) of the province's 27 provincial electoral districts. Before the results were announced, Gerard Mitchell, the referendum commissioner, confirmed the 60% threshold saying if the vote was close "whoever is governing will have to make a decision".

== Campaign ==
The campaign period for the referendum began on February 1, 2019, and applications opened for Yes and No campaigns to apply for public funding.

During the campaign, Premier (and Liberal leader) Wade MacLauchlan did not take a public position on the vote. The leaders of all other parties, however, were on record as supporting a move to MMP. The leaders were also asked about their referendum positions in the CBC Leaders' Debate.

The form of MMP proposed would have had 18 district seats and nine island-wide top-up seats filled in compensatory fashion to address disproportionality of the district winners.

Open list PR was to be used to fill the top-up seats. The voter's marked preference on the Party Vote part of the ballot "would be used to determine each party's province-wide popular vote, and the number of votes each candidate on the party list receives will determine their ranking." The party share of popular vote would determine the party's share of total seats, and if the party did not win that many district seats, the party would receive top-up seats, if possible, with the party's top-up seats being allocated to the most-popular of the party's top-up candidates. A sample MMP ballot was issued during the campaign.

== Opinion polls ==
Date(s) conducted	Polling organisation/client	Sample size	No	Yes	Unsure	Lead
14–17 Apr 2019	Mainstreet Research	636	48.8%	51.2%	—N/a	2.4%
12–15 Apr 2019	Narrative Research/The Guardian	538	42%	42%	16%	Tie
11–16 Apr 2019	MQO Research	400	35%	47%	18%	12%
7 Nov 2016	2016 plebiscite	37,040	42.8%	52.4%	—N/a	9.6%

== Results ==
The referendum was defeated, with 15 districts voting to adopt MMP and 12 voting to maintain the current system. The popular vote was a narrow majority in favour of keeping the current first-past-the-post system. Neither side, however, received a majority in 60% of districts (17/27) and therefore the referendum was not binding on the government. A recount in District 20 widened the FPTP victory somewhat, with the final popular vote approximately 52% for FPTP and 48% for MMP.

Option	District vote		Popular vote	
Option	Districts won	%	Votes	%
No; Current FPTP system retained	13	48.15%	42,372	51.74
Yes; Province adopts MMP as electoral system	14	51.85%	39,516	48.26
Source: Elections PEI

=== Analysis ===
2019 PEI referendum - synopsis of riding results, grouped by federal riding
Riding (and number)		Choice			Majority		Winner	
Riding (and number)		Yes	No	Total	Yes	No	Yes	No
Cardigan
Belfast-Murray River	4	1,338	1,585	2,923		247		✓
Georgetown-Pownal	2	1,448	1,589	3,037		141		✓
Mermaid-Stratford	5	1,736	1,271	3,007	465		✓	
Montague-Kilmuir	3	1,339	1,586	2,925		247		✓
Morell-Donagh	7	1,375	1,626	3,001		251		✓
Souris-Elmira	1	1,203	1,763	2,966		560		✓
Stanhope-Marshfield	8	1,698	1,564	3,262	134		✓	
Stratford-Keppoch	6	1,665	1,300	2,965	365		✓	
Malpeque
Borden-Kinkora	19	1,511	1,665	3,176		154		✓
Brackley-Hunter River	15	1,568	1,544	3,112	24		✓	
Cornwall-Meadowbank	16	1,769	1,619	3,388	150		✓	
Kensington-Malpeque (Note: initial count showed a Yes majority)	20	1,548	1,655	3,203		107		✓
New Haven-Rocky Point	17	1,919	1,539	3,458	380		✓	
Rustico-Emerald	18	1,696	1,619	3,315	77		✓	
Charlottetown
Charlottetown-Belvedere	11	1,599	1,571	3,170	28		✓	
Charlottetown-Brighton	13	1,893	1,316	3,209	577		✓	
Charlottetown-Hillsborough Park	9	1,365	997	2,362	368		✓	
Charlottetown-Victoria Park	12	2,041	1,078	3,119	963		✓	
Charlottetown-West Royalty	14	1,583	1,415	2,998	168		✓	
Charlottetown-Winsloe	10	1,787	1,572	3,359	215		✓	
Egmont
Alberton-Bloomfield	26	595	2,271	2,866		1,676		✓
Evangeline-Miscouche	24	1,079	1,329	2,408		250		✓
O'Leary-Inverness	25	667	1,992	2,659		1,325		✓
Summerside-South Drive	22	1,465	1,476	2,941		11		✓
Summerside-Wilmot	21	1,624	1,570	3,194	54		✓	
Tignish-Palmer Road	27	590	2,199	2,789		1,609		✓
Tyne Valley-Sherbrooke	23	1,415	1,661	3,076		246		✓
Totals
Votes		39,516	42,372	81,888	3,968	6,824	14	13
Per cent		48.26	51.74	100.00	4.84	8.33	14	13

= results revised on recount

== Aftermath ==
Following the preliminary results, Brenda Oslawsky of Vote Yes P.E.I. said that the result showed there was "significant support" for MMP, and that the group was calling on the government to convene a citizens assembly to study electoral reform. Responding to the results, Progressive Conservative leader Dennis King said Islanders have an interest in furthering the conversation on how they govern themselves and elect members of the legislature. He said he would like to see continued discussion of electoral reform in the Legislature. Peter Bevan-Baker, leader of the Green Party, called the results "agonizingly close" and said it is inevitable that proportional representation is coming but that PEI is not going to be the province leading the charge.

John Barrett of No What to Vote said the result was closer than expected but they were pleased with the result overall. Calling the result decisive, he said "Fifty-one per cent is a win and we'll take it". Barrett also said electoral reform is not off the table going forward, noting that his group was not opposed to electoral reform, only the specific model which had been proposed (MMP).
