= 2007 Belfast-Murray River provincial by-election =

← May 2007	October 15, 2007	2011 →

Riding of Belfast-Murray River
	First party	Second party
	Lib	PC
Candidate	Charlie McGeoghegan	Darlene Compton
Party	Liberal	Progressive Conservative
Popular vote	1,259	828
Percentage	54.95%	36.15%
Swing	▲14.14pp	▼19.01pp
MLA before election
Pat Binns
Progressive Conservative
Elected MLA
Charlie McGeoghegan
Liberal

A provincial by-election was held in Prince Edward Island on October 15, 2007, to fill the vacancy in the Legislative Assembly riding of Belfast-Murray River. It was called by Premier Robert Ghiz on September 17, 2007.

The by-election was caused by the decision of PC MLA and former Premier Pat Binns to resign after he was appointed ambassador to the Republic of Ireland by Stephen Harper, following his election loss in the 2007 provincial election.

The Liberal candidate was Charlie McGeoghegan, who had come within 400 votes of defeating Binns in the provincial election. The PC candidate was chosen on September 21, 2007, while both the NDP and the Greens had announced their candidates, as well; a former Liberal ran as an independent.

McGeoghegan won the byelection, defeating Progressive Conservative Darlene Compton by over 400 votes.

== Results ==
Prince Edward Island provincial by-election, 15 October 2007: Belfast-Murray River On the appointment of Pat Binns as Ambassador to Ireland
Party	Candidate	Votes	%	±%
Liberal	Charlie McGeoghegan	1,259	54.95	+14.14
Progressive Conservative	Darlene Compton	828	36.15	−19.01
Independent	Andy Clarey	107	4.67	
Green	Ahmon Katz	83	3.62	−0.42
New Democratic	Jane McNeil	10	0.44	
Total valid votes		2,287	100.0	
Liberal gain from Progressive Conservative		Swing		+16.58
Source: Elections PEI
