= Morell-Mermaid =

Former provincial electoral district in Prince Edward Island, Canada

Prince Edward Island electoral district
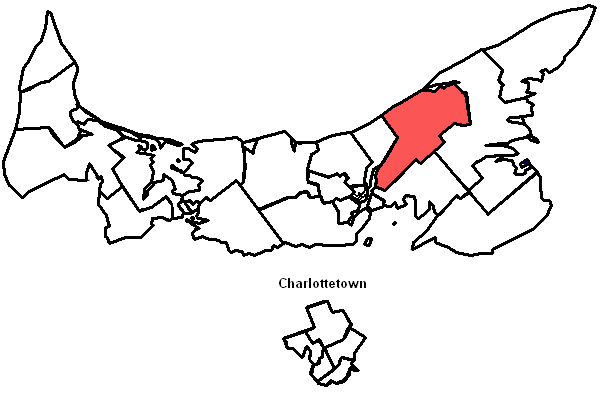
- Coordinates: 46.332°N 62.833°W

Defunct provincial electoral district
- Legislature: Legislative Assembly of Prince Edward Island
- District created: 1996
- District abolished: 2019
- First contested: 1996
- Last contested: 2015

Morell-Mermaid was a provincial electoral district for the Legislative Assembly of Prince Edward Island, Canada. Created from mostly 2nd Kings and parts of 3rd and 5th Kings, in 1996. It was named Morell-Fortune Bay from 1996 to 2007.

== Members ==
The riding has elected the following members of the Legislative Assembly:

Members of the Legislative Assembly for Morell-Mermaid
| Assembly | Years | Member | Party |
|---|---|---|---|
See 2nd Kings, 3rd Kings and 5th Kings 1873–1996
| 60th | 1996–2000 | Kevin MacAdam | Progressive Conservative |
| 61st | 2000 | Kevin MacAdam | Progressive Conservative |
| 61st | 2000–2001 | Vacant | |
| 61st | 2001–2003 | Kevin MacAdam | Progressive Conservative |
| 62nd | 2003–2006 | Kevin MacAdam | Progressive Conservative |
| 62nd | 2006–2007 | Olive Crane | Progressive Conservative |
| 63rd | 2007–2011 | Olive Crane | Progressive Conservative |
| 64th | 2011–2013 | Olive Crane | Progressive Conservative |
| 64th | 2013–2015 | Olive Crane | Independent |
| 65th | 2015–2019 | Sidney MacEwen | Progressive Conservative |

== Election results ==
=== Morell-Mermaid, 2007–2019 ===
2015 Prince Edward Island general election
| Party | Candidate | Votes | % | ±% |
|---|---|---|---|---|
| Progressive Conservative | Sidney MacEwen | 1,501 | 49.98 | -8.31 |
| Liberal | Dan MacDonald | 1,114 | 37.10 | +0.59 |
| New Democratic | Edith Perry | 211 | 7.03 | |
| Green | Meaghan Lister | 177 | 5.89 | +1.86 |
| Total valid votes | | 3,003 | 100.0 | |
| Progressive Conservative gain from Independent | | Swing | | -4.45 |

2011 Prince Edward Island general election
| Party | Candidate | Votes | % | ±% |
|---|---|---|---|---|
| Progressive Conservative | Olive Crane | 1,649 | 58.29 | +11.83 |
| Liberal | Dan MacDonald | 1,033 | 36.51 | +4.93 |
| Green | Darcie Lanthier | 114 | 4.03 | |
| Island | Roger Nowe | 33 | 1.17 | |
| Total valid votes | | 2,829 | 100.0 | |
| Progressive Conservative hold | | Swing | | +3.45 |

=== Morell-Fortune Cove, 1996–2007 ===
2007 Prince Edward Island general election
| Party | Candidate | Votes | % | ±% |
|---|---|---|---|---|
| Progressive Conservative | Olive Crane | 1,384 | 46.46 | −6.73 |
| Liberal | Doug Deacon | 941 | 31.59 | −13.71 |
| Independent | Larry McGuire | 560 | 18.80 | |
| New Democratic | Mike Avery | 94 | 3.16 | +1.65 |
| Total valid votes | | 2,979 | 100.0 | |
| Progressive Conservative hold | | Swing | | +3.49 |

Prince Edward Island provincial by-election, 20 March 2006 On the resignation of Kevin MacAdam
| Party | Candidate | Votes | % | ±% |
|---|---|---|---|---|
| Progressive Conservative | Olive Crane | 1,233 | 53.19 | -7.20 |
| Liberal | John L. Cameron | 1,050 | 45.30 | +5.69 |
| New Democratic | J'Nan Brown | 35 | 1.51 | |
| Total valid votes | | 2,318 | 100.0 | |
| Progressive Conservative hold | | Swing | | -6.44 |

2005 Prince Edward Island electoral reform referendum
| Side | Votes | % |
|---|---|---|
| No | 899 | 77.43 |
| Yes | 262 | 22.57 |

2003 Prince Edward Island general election
| Party | Candidate | Votes | % | ±% |
|---|---|---|---|---|
| Progressive Conservative | Kevin MacAdam | 1,601 | 60.39 | +2.52 |
| Liberal | Larry McGuire | 1,050 | 39.61 | -0.38 |
| Total valid votes | | 2,651 | 100.0 | |
| Progressive Conservative hold | | Swing | | +1.45 |

Prince Edward Island provincial by-election, 26 February 2001 On the resignation of Kevin MacAdam
| Party | Candidate | Votes | % | ±% |
|---|---|---|---|---|
| Progressive Conservative | Kevin J. MacAdam | 1,437 | 57.87 | -9.36 |
| Liberal | Larry McGuire | 993 | 39.99 | +8.98 |
| New Democratic | Lynn Keefe | 53 | 2.13 | +0.37 |
| Total valid votes | | 2,483 | 100.0 | |
| Progressive Conservative hold | | Swing | | -9.17 |

2000 Prince Edward Island general election
| Party | Candidate | Votes | % | ±% |
|---|---|---|---|---|
| Progressive Conservative | Kevin MacAdam | 1,791 | 67.23 | +16.51 |
| Liberal | Larry McGuire | 826 | 31.01 | -16.77 |
| New Democratic | Mike Avery | 47 | 1.76 | +0.25 |
| Total valid votes | | 2,664 | 100.0 | |
| Progressive Conservative hold | | Swing | | +16.64 |

1996 Prince Edward Island general election
| Party | Candidate | Votes | % |
|---|---|---|---|
| Progressive Conservative | Kevin MacAdam | 1,347 | 50.72 |
| Liberal | Walter Bradley | 1,269 | 47.78 |
| New Democratic | Kathy Murphy | 40 | 1.51 |
| Total valid votes | | 2,656 | 100.0 |
This riding was created from parts of the dual-member ridings of 2nd Kings, 3rd Kings and 5th Kings.

=== 2016 electoral reform plebiscite results ===
2016 Prince Edward Island electoral reform referendum
| Side | Votes | % |
|---|---|---|
| First Past the Post | 442 | 31.87 |
| Mixed Member Proportional | 396 | 28.55 |
| Dual Member Proportional Representation | 283 | 20.40 |
| Preferential Voting | 166 | 11.97 |
| First Past the Post plus leaders | 100 | 7.21 |
Two-choice preferred result
| Mixed Member Proportional | 735 | 54.97 |
| First Past the Post | 602 | 45.03 |
| Total votes cast | 1,387 | 37.08 |
| Registered voters | 3,741 | |
Source "Plebiscite Report" (PDF).

== See also ==
- List of Prince Edward Island provincial electoral districts
- Canadian provincial electoral districts
