= 2010 Progressive Conservative Party of Prince Edward Island leadership election =

Canadian provincial political party election

- Date: October 2, 2010
- Convention: Charlottetown
- Resigning leader: Pat Binns
- Won by: Olive Crane
- Ballots: 2
- Candidates: 5
- Entrance fee: $2,500
- Spending limit: $35,000

The Progressive Conservative Party of Prince Edward Island held a leadership election in Charlottetown on October 2, 2010 to select a new leader after the resignation of former Premier Pat Binns on August 30, 2007 following the defeat of the party in the 2007 general election. Olive Crane was appointed interim leader on September 4, 2007 and served until June 2010 when she resigned to successfully run for leader. Jamie Ballem, Fred McCardle, Jamie Fox, and Peter Llewellyn were all also candidates for the party's leadership.

Olive Crane won the election.

== Confirmed candidates ==
- Jamie Ballem, former PC Environment Minister
- Olive Crane, interim PC leader 2007–2010
- Fred McCardle, former MLA for Borden-Kinkora
- Peter Llewellyn, former mayor of Georgetown, PEI
- Jamie Fox, former police chief

== Results ==
The results of the leadership election was as follows.

=== First round ===
Candidate	Votes
Olive Crane	819
Jamie Ballem	692
Peter Llewellyn	94
Jamie Fox	79
Fred McCardle	58

=== Second round ===
Candidate	Votes
Olive Crane	908
Jamie Ballem	604
Jamie Fox	11
Peter Llewellyn	7
