= Charlottetown-Brighton =

Provincial electoral district in Prince Edward Island, Canada

Prince Edward Island electoral district
- Coordinates: 46.240°N 63.142°W

Provincial electoral district
- Legislature: Legislative Assembly of Prince Edward Island
MLA
Rob Lantz
Progressive Conservative
- District created: 1996
- First contested: 1996
- Last contested: 2023

Demographics
- Census division: Queens County
- Census subdivision: Charlottetown

Charlottetown-Brighton (District 13) is a provincial electoral district for the Legislative Assembly of Prince Edward Island, Canada. It was formerly named Charlottetown-Rochford Square from 1996 to 2007.

== Members ==
The riding has elected the following members of the Legislative Assembly:

Members of the Legislative Assembly for Charlottetown-Brighton
Assembly	Years	Member	Party
See 6th Queens 1966–1996
60th	1996–2000	Paul Connolly	Liberal
61st	2000–2003	Jeff Lantz	Progressive Conservative
62nd	2003–2007	Robert Ghiz	Liberal
63rd	2007–2011	Robert Ghiz	Liberal
64th	2011–2015	Robert Ghiz	Liberal
65th	2015–2019	Jordan Brown	Liberal
66th	2019–2023	Ole Hammarlund	Green
67th	2023–present	Rob Lantz	Progressive Conservative

== Election results ==
=== Charlettown-Brighton, 2007–present ===
2023 Prince Edward Island general election
Party	Candidate	Votes	%	±%
Progressive Conservative	Rob Lantz	1,171	43.0	+25.4
Green	Janice Harper	864	31.7	−8.6
Liberal	Sandra Sunil	487	17.9	−20.0
New Democratic	Michelle Neill	202	7.4	+3.1
Total valid votes		2,724	100.0	
Progressive Conservative gain from Green		Swing		+17.0

2019 Prince Edward Island general election
Party	Candidate	Votes	%	±%
Green	Ole Hammarlund	1,310	40.57	+27.52
Liberal	Jordan Brown	1,223	37.88	-1.14
Progressive Conservative	Donna Hurry	567	17.56	-20.58
New Democratic	Simone Webster	128	3.96	-5.83
Total valid votes		3,229	99.51	
Total rejected, unmarked and declined ballots		16	0.49	
Turnout		3,245	78.00	
Eligible voters		4,160		
Green gain from Liberal		Swing		+13.20

2015 Prince Edward Island general election
Party	Candidate	Votes	%	±%
Liberal	Jordan Brown	1,056	39.02	-13.44
Progressive Conservative	Rob Lantz	1,032	38.14	+8.28
Green	Derrick Biso	353	13.05	+2.88
New Democratic	Bob MacLean	265	9.79	+2.27
Total valid votes		2,706	100.0	
Liberal hold		Swing		-10.86
These results will be subject to a judicial recount.

2011 Prince Edward Island general election
Party	Candidate	Votes	%	±%
Liberal	Robert Ghiz	1,228	52.46	-7.79
Progressive Conservative	Linda Clements	699	29.86	-3.21
Green	Elizabeth Schoales	238	10.17	+3.49
New Democratic	Trevor John Leclerc	176	7.52	
Total valid votes		2,341	100.0	
Liberal hold		Swing		-2.29

2007 Prince Edward Island general election
Party	Candidate	Votes	%	±%
Liberal	Robert Ghiz	1,669	60.25	+9.60
Progressive Conservative	John Abbott	916	33.07	-12.03
Green	Cindy Burton	185	6.68	
Total valid votes		2,770	100.0	
Liberal hold		Swing		+10.82

==== 2016 electoral reform plebiscite results ====
2016 Prince Edward Island electoral reform referendum
Side	Votes	%
Mixed Member Proportional	552	35.25
Dual Member Proportional Representation	406	25.93
First Past the Post	361	23.05
Preferential Voting	166	10.60
First Past the Post plus leaders	81	5.17
Two-choice preferred result
Mixed Member Proportional	993	66.38
First Past the Post	503	33.62
Total votes cast	1,496	48.04
Registered voters	3,260	
Source "Plebiscite Report" (PDF).

=== Charlottetown-Rochford Square, 1996–2007 ===
2003 Prince Edward Island general election
Party	Candidate	Votes	%	±%
Liberal	Robert Ghiz	1,433	50.65	+11.42
Progressive Conservative	George MacDonald	1,276	45.10	-5.32
New Democratic	J'Nan Brown	120	4.24	-6.10
Total valid votes		2,829	100.0	
Liberal gain from Progressive Conservative		Swing		+8.37

2000 Prince Edward Island general election
Party	Candidate	Votes	%	±%
Progressive Conservative	Jeff Lantz	1,433	50.42	+5.34
Liberal	Ian "Tex" MacDonald	1,115	39.23	-7.80
New Democratic	Ken Bingham	294	10.34	+2.46
Total valid votes		2,842	100.0	
Progressive Conservative gain from Liberal		Swing		+6.57

1996 Prince Edward Island general election
Party	Candidate	Votes	%
Liberal	Paul Connolly	1,348	47.03
Progressive Conservative	Jeff Lantz	1,292	45.08
New Democratic	Mark Forrest	226	7.88
Total valid votes		2,866	100.0
This riding was created from parts of the dual-member riding of 6th Queens.

== See also ==
- List of Prince Edward Island provincial electoral districts
- Canadian provincial electoral districts
