= Deputy Premier of Prince Edward Island =

Deputy premier of Prince Edward Island
- Incumbent; Vacant since December 12, 2025
- Executive Council of Prince Edward Island
- Style: The Honourable
- Member of: Legislative Assembly; Executive Council
- Appointer: Lieutenant Governor of Prince Edward Island
- Term length: At His Majesty's pleasure
- Formation: January 13, 2010 (16 years ago)

The deputy premier of Prince Edward Island is an office that was created on January 13, 2010, with the appointment of its first occupier George Webster, by Premier Robert Ghiz. Webster continued in this post under Premier Wade MacLauchlan, from February 23, 2015, to May 20, 2015.

On May 9, 2019, Darlene Compton was named deputy premier, under Premier Dennis King. She later resigned on April 3, 2023. Compton was elected Speaker of the Prince Edward Island legislature on May 23, 2023.

Bloyce Thompson was appointed the third deputy premier on April 14, 2023. He later resigned on December 12, 2025, and was appointed premier.

No.	Name	Term of office		Political party	Premier
1	George T. Webster	January 13, 2010	May 20, 2015	Liberal	Robert Ghiz, Wade MacLauchlan
2	Darlene Compton	May 9, 2019	April 3, 2023	Progressive Conservative	Dennis King
3	Bloyce Thompson	April 14, 2023	December 12, 2025	Progressive Conservative	Dennis King, Rob Lantz

== See also ==
- Premier (Canada)
- List of Prince Edward Island premiers
- Executive Council of Prince Edward Island
