= Kent Dollar =

Canadian politician

Minister of Housing and Communities
- Incumbent
- Assumed office March, 2026
- Preceded by: Sidney MacEwen

Government House Leader
- Incumbent
- Assumed office February, 2026
- Preceded by: Susie Dillon
- Succeeded by: Matthew MacKay

Member of the Legislative Assembly of Prince Edward Island for Brackley-Hunter River
- Incumbent
- Assumed office August 12, 2025
- Preceded by: Dennis King

Personal details
- Party: Progressive Conservative

Kent Dollar is a Canadian politician, who was elected to the Legislative Assembly of Prince Edward Island in the 2025 Brackley-Hunter River provincial by-election as a member of the Prince Edward Island Progressive Conservative Party.

== Electoral record ==
2025 Brackley-Hunter River provincial by-election Prince Edward Island general election: August 12, 2025
Party	Candidate	Votes	%	±%
Progressive Conservative	Kent Dollar	1,140	50.13	-18.03
Green	Phillip Hamming	538	23.66	+6.36
Liberal	Nicole Ford	527	23.18	+11.68
New Democratic	Michelle Neill	63	2.77	-0.33
Total valid votes		2,275	100	
Total rejected ballots		0	0	0
Turnout		2,275		
Eligible voters		4,076		
Progressive Conservative hold		Swing		-18.03
