= Borden-Kinkora =

Provincial electoral district in Prince Edward Island, Canada

Prince Edward Island electoral district
- Coordinates: 46.284°N 63.590°W

Provincial electoral district
- Legislature: Legislative Assembly of Prince Edward Island
MLA
Matt MacFarlane
Green
- District created: 1996
- First contested: 1996
- Last contested: 2024 (by-election)

Demographics
- Census division(s): Prince County, Queens County
- Census subdivision(s): Bedeque and Area, Borden, Borden-Carleton, Crapaud, Crapaud, Part 1, Crapaud, Part 2, Kensington, Part 1, Kinkora (fire district), Kinkora (rural municipality), Victoria (fire district), Victoria (rural municipality)

Borden-Kinkora (District 19) is a provincial electoral district for the Legislative Assembly of Prince Edward Island, Canada.

The riding contains the rural southeastern portion of Prince County, running from the Wilmot River outside of Summerside in the west, and extends into neighbouring Queens County to encompass the Crapaud and Victoria areas. Borden-Carleton, at the northern end of the Confederation Bridge is the riding's largest community.

== Members ==
The riding has elected the following members of the Legislative Assembly:

Members of the Legislative Assembly for Borden-Kinkora
Assembly	Years	Member	Party
See 4th Prince 1873–1996
60th	1996–2000	Eric Hammill	Progressive Conservative
61st	2000–2003	Eric Hammill	Progressive Conservative
62nd	2003–2007	Fred McCardle	Progressive Conservative
63rd	2007–2011	George Webster	Liberal
64th	2011–2015	George Webster	Liberal
65th	2015–2019	Jamie Fox	Progressive Conservative
66th	2019–2023	Jamie Fox	Progressive Conservative
67th	2023	Jamie Fox	Progressive Conservative
67th	2024–present	Matt MacFarlane	Green

== Election results ==
Prince Edward Island provincial by-election, February 7, 2024 Resignation of Jamie Fox
Party	Candidate	Votes	%	±%
Green	Matt MacFarlane	1,226	49.00	+14.19
Progressive Conservative	Carmen Reeves	964	38.53	-21.62
Liberal	Gordon Sobey	272	10.87	
New Democratic	Karen Morton	40	1.60	-1.31
Total valid votes		2,502	99.80	
Total rejected ballots		5	0.20	-0.46
Turnout		2,507	58.91	-9.06
Eligible voters		4,256		
Green gain from Progressive Conservative		Swing		+17.90

2023 Prince Edward Island general election
Party	Candidate	Votes	%	±%
Progressive Conservative	Jamie Fox	1,719	60.15	+8.04
Green	Matt MacFarlane	995	34.81	+2.53
New Democratic	Carole MacFarlane	83	2.90	+1.91
Island	Paul Smitz	61	2.13	
Total valid votes		2,858	99.34	
Total rejected ballots		19	0.66	+0.57
Turnout		2,877	67.97	–12.37
Eligible voters		4,233		
Progressive Conservative hold		Swing		+2.76

2019 Prince Edward Island general election
Party	Candidate	Votes	%	±%
Progressive Conservative	Jamie Fox	1,680	52.11	+4.97
Green	Matt MacFarlane	1,041	32.29	+17.21
Liberal	Jamie Stride	417	12.93	-21.13
Independent	Fred McCardle	54	1.67	N.A.
New Democratic	Joan Gauvin	32	0.99	-2.73
Total valid votes		3,224	99.91	
Total rejected ballots		3	0.09	-0.20
Turnout		3,227	80.33	-2.32
Eligible voters		4,017		
Progressive Conservative hold		Swing		-6.12

2015 Prince Edward Island general election
Party	Candidate	Votes	%	±%
Progressive Conservative	Jamie Fox	1,597	47.14	+1.52
Liberal	Ramona Roberts	1,154	34.06	-15.35
Green	Ranald MacFarlane	511	15.08	+10.11
New Democratic	Aleida Tweten	126	3.72	
Total valid votes		3,388	99.71	
Total rejected ballots		10	0.29	+0.02
Turnout		3,398	82.66	+4.80
Eligible voters		4,111		
Progressive Conservative gain from Liberal		Swing		+8.43

2011 Prince Edward Island general election
Party	Candidate	Votes	%	±%
Liberal	George Webster	1,590	49.41	-3.02
Progressive Conservative	Jamie Fox	1,468	45.62	+6.50
Green	Conor Leggott	160	4.97	-3.48
Total valid votes		3,218	99.72	
Total rejected ballots		9	0.28	-0.01
Turnout		3,227	77.85	-4.51
Eligible voters		4,145		
Liberal hold		Swing		-4.76

2007 Prince Edward Island general election
Party	Candidate	Votes	%	±%
Liberal	George Webster	1,811	52.43	+4.90
Progressive Conservative	Fred McCardle	1,351	39.11	-10.74
Green	Jamie Larkin	292	8.45	
Total valid votes		3,454	99.71	
Total rejected ballots		10	0.29	-0.17
Turnout		3,464	82.36	-1.84
Eligible voters		4,206		
Liberal gain from Progressive Conservative		Swing		+7.82

2005 Prince Edward Island electoral reform referendum
Side	Votes	%
No	714	66.54
Yes	359	33.46

2003 Prince Edward Island general election
Party	Candidate	Votes	%	±%
Progressive Conservative	Fred McCardle	1,528	49.85	-12.34
Liberal	Lorne Sutherland	1,457	47.54	+14.74
New Democratic	James Rodd	80	2.61	-2.40
Total valid votes		3,065	99.55	
Total rejected ballots		14	0.45	-0.00
Turnout		3,079	84.19	+3.09
Eligible voters		3,657		
Progressive Conservative hold		Swing		-13.54

2000 Prince Edward Island general election
Party	Candidate	Votes	%	±%
Progressive Conservative	Eric Hammill	1,900	62.19	+11.93
Liberal	Lorne Sutherland	1,002	32.80	-10.49
New Democratic	Andy Dibling	153	5.01	-1.44
Total valid votes		3,055	99.54	
Total rejected ballots		14	0.46	-0.53
Turnout		3,069	81.10	+1.44
Eligible voters		3,784		
Progressive Conservative hold		Swing		+11.21

1996 Prince Edward Island general election
Party	Candidate	Votes	%
Progressive Conservative	Eric Hammill	1,521	50.26
Liberal	Stavert Huestis	1,310	43.29
New Democratic	Gerard Sexton	195	6.44
Total valid votes		3,026	99.02
Total rejected ballots		30	0.98
Turnout		3,056	79.67
Eligible voters		3,836	
This riding was created from parts of the dual-member riding 4th Prince.

=== 2016 electoral reform plebiscite results ===
2016 Prince Edward Island electoral reform referendum
Side	Votes	%
First Past the Post	504	34.78
Mixed Member Proportional	353	24.36
Dual Member Proportional Representation	275	18.98
Preferential Voting	174	12.01
First Past the Post plus leaders	143	9.87
Two-choice preferred result
First Past the Post	706	51.16
Mixed Member Proportional	674	48.84
Total votes cast	1,449	34.85
Registered voters	4,158	
Source "Plebiscite Report" (PDF).

== See also ==
- List of Prince Edward Island provincial electoral districts
- Canadian provincial electoral districts
