= Ghiz =

Ghiz is a surname. Notable people with the surname include:

- Robert Ghiz (born 1974), 33rd premier of Prince Edward Island, Canada
- Joe Ghiz (1945–1996), 29th premier of Prince Edward Island, Canada
