= Fred McCardle =

Canadian politician

MLA for Borden-Kinkora
- In office 2003 – June 12, 2007
- Preceded by: Eric Hammill
- Succeeded by: George Webster

Personal details
- Born: 4 February 1951 (age 75)
- Party: Progressive Conservative

Fred McCardle (born 4 February 1951) is a Canadian politician, who represented the electoral district of Borden-Kinkora in the Legislative Assembly of Prince Edward Island from 2003 to 2007. He was a member of the Prince Edward Island Progressive Conservative Party. McCardle is a fifth generation farmer who has run his family farm for 35 years; growing potatoes, cereals and grasses.

He stood as a candidate in the party's 2010 leadership race, but lost to Olive Crane.

McCardle also put his name forward in the 2019 PEI General Election, as an Independent candidate. He subsequently lost to incumbent PC MLA Jamie Fox.
