= 2025 Brackley-Hunter River provincial by-election =

Election in Canada

← 2023	August 12, 2025	Next →

District of Brackley-Hunter River
- Turnout: 55.79% (▼14.67%)
	First party	Second party	Third party
Candidate	Kent Dollar	Philip Hamming	Nicole Ford
Party	Progressive Conservative	Green	Liberal
Popular vote	1,140	538	527
Percentage	50.26%	23.72%	23.24%
Swing	▼17.94%	▲6.41%	▲11.73%
MLA before election
Dennis King
Progressive Conservative
Elected MLA
Kent Dollar
Progressive Conservative

A by-election took place on August 12, 2025, in the provincial riding of Brackley-Hunter River to elect a member of the Legislative Assembly of Prince Edward Island. It was held on the same day as a by-election in Charlottetown-Hillsborough Park.

The by-election was triggered by the resignation of Dennis King, who was at the time the Premier of Prince Edward Island.

It was originally announced that the by-election would take place on August 11, however, there was an error on the Election Date Calculation Tool used by Elections PEI.

== Result ==
Prince Edward Island provincial by-election, August 12, 2025: Brackley-Hunter River Resignation of Dennis King
** Preliminary results — Not yet official **
Party	Candidate	Votes	%	±%
Progressive Conservative	Kent Dollar	1,140	50.26	-17.94
Green	Philip Hamming	538	23.72	+6.41
Liberal	Nicole Ford	527	23.24	+11.73
New Democratic	Michelle Neill	63	2.78	-0.20
Total valid votes		2,268	99.69	
Total rejected ballots		7	0.31	-0.23
Turnout		2,275	55.81	-14.65
Eligible voters		4,076		
Progressive Conservative hold		Swing		-12.18

== Previous result ==
2023 Prince Edward Island general election: Brackley-Hunter River
Party	Candidate	Votes	%	±%
Progressive Conservative	Dennis King	1,903	68.21	+26.46
Green	Greg Bradley	483	17.31	-10.59
Liberal	Nicole Ford	321	11.51	-17.03
New Democratic	Leah-Jane Hayward	83	2.97	+1.17
Total valid votes		2,790	99.47	
Total rejected ballots		15	0.53	+0.25
Turnout		2,805	70.46	-9.60
Eligible voters		3,981		
Progressive Conservative hold		Swing		+18.53
