= Jeff Lantz =

Canadian politician (born 1961)

His Honour Jeff Lantz

Justice of the Provincial Court of Prince Edward Island
- Incumbent
- Assumed office September 27, 2005
- Preceded by: Ralph C. Thompson

Member of the Legislative Assembly of Prince Edward Island for Charlottetown-Rochford Square
- In office April 17, 2000 – September 29, 2003
- Preceded by: Paul Connolly
- Succeeded by: Robert Ghiz

Personal details
- Born: February 3, 1961 (age 65)
- Party: Progressive Conservative
- Occupation: Lawyer, Judge

Jeffrey E. Lantz (born 3 February 1961) is a Canadian judge and former politician, who was elected to the Legislative Assembly of Prince Edward Island in the 2000 provincial election.

Educated at the University of Prince Edward Island and University of New Brunswick, Lantz practiced law in Charlottetown for twelve years. Lantz also served as president of the Heart and Stroke Foundation. He represented the electoral district of Charlottetown-Rochford Square and was a member of the Progressive Conservative Party. He served in the provincial cabinet as Attorney General, Minister of Education and Minister of Tourism. Lantz did not reoffer in the 2003 election.

After leaving politics, he was named a provincial court judge. His brother Rob Lantz later served as leader of the Progressive Conservative Party and Premier of Prince Edward Island. He is the current MLA for Lantz's former district.
