= Charlie McGeoghegan =

Canadian politician

MLA for Belfast-Murray River
- In office October 2007 – 4 May 2015
- Preceded by: Pat Binns
- Succeeded by: Darlene Compton

Personal details
- Born: 29 July 1974 (age 51) Montague, Prince Edward Island
- Party: Liberal
- Occupation: Fisherman

Charlie McGeoghegan (born 29 July 1974) is a former Canadian politician.

He was elected to the Legislative Assembly of Prince Edward Island in a by-election on 15 October 2007, following the resignation of Pat Binns. He represented the electoral district of Belfast-Murray River from 2007 to 2015 and is a member of the Liberal Party.

McGeoghegan was also the party's candidate in the general election on 28 May 2007.

== Arm wrestling ==
After completing high school, he attended the Canadian Coast Guard College in Point Edward, Nova Scotia. Prior to entering elected politics, McGeoghegan was a fisherman and a competitive arm wrestler. McGeoghegan was the winner in the 198-pound division of the 2003 World Arm Wrestling Championship held in Ottawa.

== Electoral record ==
Prince Edward Island provincial by-election, 15 October 2007: Belfast-Murray River On the appointment of Pat Binns as Ambassador to Ireland
Party	Candidate	Votes	%	±%
Liberal	Charlie McGeoghegan	1,259	54.95	+14.14
Progressive Conservative	Darlene Compton	828	36.15	−19.01
Independent	Andy Clarey	107	4.67	
Green	Ahmon Katz	83	3.62	−0.42
New Democratic	Jane McNeil	10	0.44	
Total valid votes		2,287	100.0	
Liberal gain from Progressive Conservative		Swing		+16.58
Source: Elections PEI

2007 Prince Edward Island general election
Party	Candidate	Votes	%	+/–
Progressive Conservative Party	Pat Binns	1,527	55.15	
Liberal Party	Charlie McGeoghegan	1,130	40.81	
Green	Ahmon Katz	112	4.04	–
Total		2,769	100.0	

2011 Prince Edward Island general election
Party	Candidate	Votes	%	±%
Liberal	Charlie McGeoghegan	1,135	45.86	-9.09
Progressive Conservative	Darlene Compton	1,127	45.54	+9.39
Green	John Burhoe	114	4.61	+0.99
Island	Andy Clarey	99	4.00	-0.67
Total valid votes		2,475	100.0	
Liberal hold		Swing		-9.24

2015 Prince Edward Island general election
Party	Candidate	Votes	%	±%
Progressive Conservative	Darlene Compton	1,203	45.12	-0.42
Liberal	Charlie McGeoghegan	1,095	41.07	-4.79
New Democratic	Alan Hicken	216	8.10	
Green	Jordan MacPhee	152	5.70	+1.09
Total valid votes		2,666	100.0	
Progressive Conservative gain from Liberal		Swing		+2.18
