= Sidney MacEwen =

Canadian politician

The Honourable Sidney MacEwen MLA

Minister of Housing and Communities, Minister of Transportation, Infastructure, and Energy
- Incumbent
- Assumed office February 12, 2026
- Preceded by: Ernie Hudson, Cory Deagle

34th Speaker of the Prince Edward Island legislature
- In office March 25, 2025 – February 12, 2026
- Preceded by: Darlene Compton
- Succeeded by: Brad Trivers

Deputy Speaker of the Prince Edward Island Legislature
- In office April, 2023 – March 25, 2025
- Preceded by: Hal Perry
- Succeeded by: Brad Trivers

Government House Leader
- In office 2019–2023
- Preceded by: Richard Brown
- Succeeded by: Matthew MacKay

Opposition Whip
- In office March, 2016 – 2019
- Preceded by: Colin Lavie
- Succeeded by: Lynne Lund

Member of the Legislative Assembly of Prince Edward Island for Morell-Mermaid
- In office May 4, 2015 – March 26, 2019
- Preceded by: Olive Crane
- Succeeded by: Riding dissolved

Member of the Legislative Assembly of Prince Edward Island for Morell-Donagh
- Incumbent
- Assumed office April 23, 2019
- Preceded by: Riding established

Personal details
- Born: November 18, 1979 (age 46)
- Party: Progressive Conservative

Sidney MacEwen (born 18 November 1979) is a Canadian politician, the 34th Speaker of the Prince Edward Island legislature from 2025 to 2026, who was elected to the Legislative Assembly of Prince Edward Island in the 2015 provincial election. He represents the electoral district of Morell-Donagh as a member of the Progressive Conservative Party. He was re-elected in the 2023 general election.

MacEwen holds a degree in industrial engineering from Dalhousie University. Prior to his election to the legislature, he also works as a lobster and tuna fisherman which DFO has stated is a conflict of interest while being considered for a Cabinet portfolio, as a former business consultant for MRSB Consulting and as chief of staff to former Progressive Conservative leader Olive Crane.

He was elected Speaker of the Legislative Assembly of Prince Edward Island, on 25 March 2025. On February 12, 2026 he was appointed the Minister responsible for Transportation and Infrastructure, and thus resigned as Speaker.

== Electoral record ==
2023 Prince Edward Island general election: Morell-Donagh
Party	Candidate	Votes	%	±%
Progressive Conservative	Sidney MacEwen	1,899	70.4	+12.8
Green	John Allen MacLean	349	12.9	-10.0
Liberal	Terry MacDonald	282	10.5	-7.9
New Democratic	Kevin Trainor	115	4.3	+3.1
Island	Christopher Landry	44	1.6	+1.6
Total valid votes		2,698	100.0	
Progressive Conservative hold		Swing		+11.4

2019 Prince Edward Island general election: Morell-Donagh
Party	Candidate	Votes	%	±%
Progressive Conservative	Sidney MacEwen	1,752	57.6%	
Green	Kyle MacDonald	697	22.9%	
Liberal	Susan Myers	557	18.3%	
New Democratic	Margaret Andrade	35	1.2%	
Total valid votes		3,041	100.00	
This is a newly created district

2015 Prince Edward Island general election
Party	Candidate	Votes	%	±%
Progressive Conservative	Sidney MacEwen	1,501	49.98	-8.31
Liberal	Dan MacDonald	1,114	37.10	+0.59
New Democratic	Edith Perry	211	7.03	
Green	Meaghan Lister	177	5.89	+1.86
Total valid votes		3,003	100.0	
Progressive Conservative gain from Independent		Swing		-4.45
