= Darlene Compton =

Canadian politician

Darlene Compton MLA

33rd Speaker of the Prince Edward Island legislature
- In office May 23, 2023 – February 27, 2025
- Preceded by: Colin LaVie
- Succeeded by: Sidney MacEwen

2nd Deputy Premier of Prince Edward Island
- In office May 9, 2019 – April 3, 2023
- Premier: Dennis King
- Preceded by: George T. Webster (2015)
- Succeeded by: Bloyce Thompson

Member of the Legislative Assembly of Prince Edward Island for Belfast-Murray River
- Incumbent
- Assumed office May 4, 2015
- Preceded by: Charlie McGeoghegan

Personal details
- Born: January 21, 1961 (age 65)
- Party: Progressive Conservative

Darlene Compton (born January 21, 1961) is a Canadian politician who was the 33rd Speaker of the Prince Edward Island legislature from 2023 to 2025. She served as the second deputy premier, and minister of finance and the status of women of Prince Edward Island from 2019 to 2023. She was elected to the Legislative Assembly of Prince Edward Island in the 2015 provincial election. She represents the electoral district of Belfast-Murray River as a member of the Progressive Conservative Party.

She was previously the party's candidate in the same district for a by-election in 2007, following the resignation of Pat Binns from the legislature, but lost to Charlie McGeoghegan. She ran again in the 2011 provincial election, again losing to McGeoghegan by a margin of just eight votes. She was subsequently a candidate in the party's 2015 leadership election, finishing third behind Rob Lantz and James Aylward.

On May 9, 2019 Compton was appointed deputy premier, following Premier Dennis King's recommendation. She was re-elected in the 2023 general election.

As of June 2022, Compton is a shareholder in several energy and tobacco companies, including Halliburton and Phillip Morris.

== Electoral record ==
2023 Prince Edward Island general election: Belfast-Murray River
Party	Candidate	Votes	%	±%
Progressive Conservative	Darlene Compton	1,510	58.7	+6.1
Liberal	Katherine Bryson	520	20.2	-0.7
Green	Laverne MacInnis	420	16.3	-10.2
New Democratic	Michelle Hodgson	124	4.8	
Total valid votes		2,574	100.0	
Progressive Conservative hold		Swing		+6.2

2019 Prince Edward Island general election: Belfast-Murray River
Party	Candidate	Votes	%	±%
Progressive Conservative	Darlene Compton	1,545	52.5	+7.4
Green	James Sanders	781	26.6	+20.9
Liberal	Ian MacPherson	615	20.9	-20.2
Total valid votes		2,941	100.0	
Progressive Conservative hold		Swing		+7.4
Source: Elections Prince Edward Island

2015 Prince Edward Island general election: Belfast-Murray River
Party	Candidate	Votes	%	±%
Progressive Conservative	Darlene Compton	1,203	45.12	-0.42
Liberal	Charlie McGeoghegan	1,095	41.07	-4.79
New Democratic	Alan Hicken	216	8.10	
Green	Jordan MacPhee	152	5.70	+1.09
Total valid votes		2,666	100.0	
Progressive Conservative gain from Liberal		Swing		+2.18

2011 Prince Edward Island general election: Belfast-Murray River
Party	Candidate	Votes	%	±%
Liberal	Charlie McGeoghegan	1,135	45.86	-9.09
Progressive Conservative	Darlene Compton	1,127	45.54	+9.39
Green	John Burhoe	114	4.61	+0.99
Island	Andy Clarey	99	4.00	-0.67
Total valid votes		2,475	100.0	
Liberal hold		Swing		-9.24

Prince Edward Island provincial by-election, 15 October 2007: Belfast-Murray River On the appointment of Pat Binns as Ambassador to Ireland
Party	Candidate	Votes	%	±%
Liberal	Charlie McGeoghegan	1,259	54.95	+14.14
Progressive Conservative	Darlene Compton	828	36.15	−19.01
Independent	Andy Clarey	107	4.67	
Green	Ahmon Katz	83	3.62	−0.42
New Democratic	Jane McNeil	10	0.44	
Total valid votes		2,287	100.0	
Liberal gain from Progressive Conservative		Swing		+16.58
Source: Elections PEI
