= Jamie Fox (Canadian politician) =

Canadian politician

Member of the Legislative Assembly of Prince Edward Island for Borden-Kinkora
- In office May 4, 2015 – November 11, 2023
- Preceded by: George Webster
- Succeeded by: Matt MacFarlane

Interim leader of the Progressive Conservative Party of Prince Edward Island
- In office October 15, 2015 – October 20, 2017
- Preceded by: Rob Lantz
- Succeeded by: James Aylward

Minister of Fisheries & Communities, Province of Prince Edward Island
- In office May 9, 2019 – 2023
- Preceded by: Portfolio Established
- Succeeded by: Cory Deagle

Personal details
- Born: June 11, 1964 (age 62) Woodstock, New Brunswick, Canada
- Party: Conservative; Progressive Conservative

Jamie D. Fox (born June 11, 1964) is a Canadian politician, who served as interim leader of the Progressive Conservative Party of Prince Edward Island and Opposition leader in the Legislative Assembly from October 15, 2015 to October 20, 2017. Fox was elected to the Legislative Assembly of Prince Edward Island in the 2015 provincial election. He represents the electoral district of Borden-Kinkora. In October 2017, James Alyward was elected as the Leader of the Progressive Conservative Party of PEI after Fox serving for just over two years as the Interim Leader.

Fox was the Opposition Critic for the Departments of Transportation, Infrastructure & Energy and Justice & Public Safety from 2015 to 2019.

He has also served on the Infrastructure & Energy Standing Committee, the Agricultural & Fisheries Standing Committee, Public Account's Committee's and currently sits on the Policy &Priorities Committee of Executive Council as the chairman.

He was previously the party's candidate in the same district for the 2011 provincial election, and was an unsuccessful candidate in the party's 2010 leadership election.

Fox has been successful in having three Private Members Bills passed in the Legislature, 2016 Highway Traffic Act Bill improving officer safety, 2017 Workers Compensation Act recognizing PTSD coverage for all workers and 2018 Mandatory Sexual Assault Law Training Act requiring Judges to have sexual assault law education.

In April 2019, Fox was re-elected in the Provincial General election and was appointed the Minister of Fisheries & Communities (2019-2023) for the Province of Prince Edward Island.

Fox chaired the Atlantic Fisheries Ministers which included the Provinces of Newfoundland & Labrador, Nova Scotia, New Brunswick and Quebec from 2019 to 2023.

Prior to his election to the legislature, Fox was a Chief of Police and a businessman in Prince Edward Island and New Brunswick.

On behalf of the Government of Prince Edward Island, Fox has held trade talks with Ambassadors from the United States of America, United Kingdom, Israel, France, Taiwan, Turkey, Viet Nam. Japan, Iceland, Norway and Turks Caicos Islands.

Fox also became involved with Imperial Oil and designed, constructed and operated Esso retail and commercial sites in Prince Edward Island and New Brunswick from 1998 to 2012 and provided consulting in fuel pricing and regulatory management.

He was re-elected in the 2023 general election.

On November 10, 2023, Fox announced his resignation (effective November 11, 2023) as an MLA and that he would be running as the Conservative Party of Canada candidate in the Malpeque riding, for the 2025 federal election. The provincial by-election to replace him was held on February 7, 2024. It was won by Green candidate Matt MacFarlane.

Fox lost against Liberal incumbent Heath MacDonald in the 2025 federal election. This was seen as a disappointment to his supporters, and the party, who had hope Fox was going to flip the riding.

At the time of the 2025 Canadian federal election, he lived in Albany, Prince Edward Island.

== Electoral record ==
2025 Canadian federal election: Malpeque
Party	Candidate	Votes	%	±%	Expenditures
Liberal	Heath MacDonald	15,485	57.60	+15.58	$84,828.51
Conservative	Jamie Fox	9,846	36.63	+3.50	$81,710.22
Green	Anna Keenan	1,049	3.90	−10.12	$23,174.45
New Democratic	Cassie Mackay	371	1.38	−6.65	$64.20
People's	Hilda Baughan	132	0.49	−2.30	$1,943.54
Total valid votes/expense limit		26,883	99.20	–0.11	$109,009.16
Total rejected ballots		216	0.80	+0.11	
Turnout		27,099	82.58		
Eligible voters		32,815			
Liberal notional hold		Swing		+6.04	
Source: Elections Canada
Note: number of eligible voters does not include voting day registrations.

2023 Prince Edward Island general election: Borden-Kinkora
Party	Candidate	Votes	%	±%
Progressive Conservative	Jamie Fox	1,719	60.15	+8.04
Green	Matt MacFarlane	995	34.81	+2.53
New Democratic	Carole MacFarlane	83	2.90	+1.91
Island	Paul Smitz	61	2.13	
Total valid votes		2,858	99.34	
Total rejected ballots		19	0.66	+0.57
Turnout		2,877	67.97	–12.37
Eligible voters		4,233		
Progressive Conservative hold		Swing		+2.76

2019 Prince Edward Island general election
Party	Candidate	Votes	%	±%
Progressive Conservative	Jamie Fox	1,597	47.10	+1.48
Liberal	Ramona Roberts	1,154	34.03	-15.38
Green	Ranald MacFarlane	511	15.07	+10.10
New Democratic	Aleida Tweten	129	3.80	
Total valid votes		3,391	100.0	
Progressive Conservative gain from Liberal		Swing		+8.43

2015 Prince Edward Island general election
Party	Candidate	Votes	%	±%
Progressive Conservative	Jamie Fox	1,680	52.11	
Liberal	Jamie Stride	417	12.93	
Green	Matthew MacFarlane	1,041	32.29	
New Democratic	Joan Gauvin	32	0.99	
IND	Fred McCardle	54	1.67	
Total valid votes		3,224	100.0	
Progressive Conservative hold		Swing		{{{3}}}

2011 Prince Edward Island general election
Party	Candidate	Votes	%	±%
Liberal	George Webster	1,590	49.41	-3.02
Progressive Conservative	Jamie Fox	1,468	45.62	+6.51
Green	Conor Leggott	160	4.97	-3.48
Total valid votes		3,218	100.0	
Liberal hold		Swing		-4.76
