= Brackley-Hunter River =

Provincial electoral district in Prince Edward Island, Canada

Prince Edward Island electoral district
- Coordinates: 46.345°N 63.235°W

Provincial electoral district
- Legislature: Legislative Assembly of Prince Edward Island
MLA
Kent Dollar
Progressive Conservative
- District created: 2019
- First contested: 2019
- Last contested: 2025 (by-election)

Demographics
- Census division: Queens County
- Census subdivision(s): Brackley, Darlington, Hampshire, Hunter River, Miltonvale Park, New Glasgow, North River, North Shore (fire district), North Wiltshire, Warren Grove, Winsloe North

Brackley-Hunter River (District 15) is a provincial electoral district for the Legislative Assembly of Prince Edward Island, Canada. It was created prior to the 2019 election from parts of the former districts West Royalty-Springvale, York-Oyster Bed, Rustico-Emerald and Kellys Cross-Cumberland.

The riding consists of rural communities north and north-west of Charlottetown, including Hunter River, Oyster Bed Bridge, and Warren Grove.

== Member ==
The riding has elected the following members of the Legislative Assembly:

Member of the Legislative Assembly for Brackley-Hunter River
Assembly	Years	Member	Party
66th	2019–2023	Dennis King	Progressive Conservative
67th	2023–2025	Dennis King	Progressive Conservative
67th	2025–present	Kent Dollar	Progressive Conservative

== Election results ==
=== Brackley-Hunter River, 2019–present ===
Prince Edward Island provincial by-election, August 12, 2025 Resignation of Dennis King
** Preliminary results — Not yet official **
Party	Candidate	Votes	%	±%
Progressive Conservative	Kent Dollar	1,140	50.26	-17.94
Green	Philip Hamming	538	23.72	+6.41
Liberal	Nicole Ford	527	23.24	+11.73
New Democratic	Michelle Neill	63	2.78	-0.20
Total valid votes		2,268	99.69	
Total rejected ballots		7	0.31	-0.23
Turnout		2,275	55.81	-14.65
Eligible voters		4,076		
Progressive Conservative hold		Swing		-12.18

2023 Prince Edward Island general election
Party	Candidate	Votes	%	±%
Progressive Conservative	Dennis King	1,903	68.21	+26.46
Green	Greg Bradley	483	17.31	-10.59
Liberal	Nicole Ford	321	11.51	-17.03
New Democratic	Leah-Jane Hayward	83	2.97	+1.17
Total valid votes		2,790	99.47	
Total rejected ballots		15	0.53	+0.25
Turnout		2,805	70.46	-9.60
Eligible voters		3,981		
Progressive Conservative hold		Swing		+18.53

2019 Prince Edward Island general election
Party	Candidate	Votes	%	±%
Progressive Conservative	Dennis King	1,315	41.75	+4.44
Liberal	Windsor Wight	899	28.54	-9.55
Green	Greg Bradley	879	27.90	+12.90
New Democratic	Leah-Jane Hayward	57	1.81	-7.56
Total valid votes		3,150	99.72	
Total rejected ballots		9	0.28	
Turnout		3,159	80.07	
Eligible voters		3,946		
Progressive Conservative notional gain from Liberal		Swing		+6.99

2015 Prince Edward Island general election redistributed results
Party	Votes	%
Liberal	1,175	38.09
Progressive Conservative	1,151	37.31
Green	470	15.24
New Democratic	289	9.37
Source(s) Source: Ridingbuilder

== Referendum and plebiscite results ==
=== 2019 electoral reform referendum ===
The 2019 Prince Edward Island electoral reform referendum was held on April 23, 2019.

== See also ==
- List of Prince Edward Island provincial electoral districts
- Canadian provincial electoral districts
