= George T. Webster =

Canadian politician

1st Deputy Premier of Prince Edward Island
- In office January 13, 2010 – May 20, 2015
- Premier: Robert Ghiz; Wade MacLauchlan
- Preceded by: post created
- Succeeded by: Darlene Compton (2019)

Member of the Legislative Assembly of Prince Edward Island for Borden-Kinkora
- In office June 12, 2007 – May 4, 2015
- Preceded by: Fred McCardle
- Succeeded by: Jamie Fox

Personal details
- Born: George Thomas Webster; August 7, 1949 (age 76) Summerside, Prince Edward Island
- Party: Liberal
- Occupation: farmer

George Thomas Webster (born 7 August 1949) is a Canadian politician. He represented the electoral district of Borden-Kinkora in the Legislative Assembly of Prince Edward Island from 2007 to 2015 as a member of the Liberal Party.

In June 2007, Webster was appointed to the Executive Council of Prince Edward Island as Minister of Environment, Energy and Forestry. In January 2009, Webster was moved to Minister of Agriculture. In January 2010, he was named the first deputy premier of Prince Edward Island and Minister of Agriculture and Forestry.

Webster did not reoffer in the 2015 election.
