= Eric Hammill =

Canadian politician and farmer (1932–2023)

Member of the Legislative Assembly of Prince Edward Island for Borden-Kinkora
- In office November 18, 1996 – September 29, 2003
- Preceded by: Riding Established
- Succeeded by: Fred McCardle

Personal details
- Born: August 25, 1932 Lower Freetown, Prince Edward Island, Canada
- Died: September 28, 2023 (aged 91) Summerside, Prince Edward Island, Canada
- Party: Progressive Conservative

J. Eric Hammill (August 25, 1932 – September 28, 2023) was a Canadian farmer and politician from Prince Edward Island. He represented Borden-Kinkora in the Legislative Assembly of Prince Edward Island from 1996 to 2003 as a Progressive Conservative.

== Life and career ==
J. Eric Hammill was born in Lower Freetown, Prince Edward Island on August 25, 1932. He purchased the family farm in 1954 and, in 1955, married Helen McIsaac. Hammill was president of the Kinkora Dairy Cooperative, Atlantic representative on the National Farm Products Marketing Council for nine years and Secretary-Manager for the Prince Edward Island Federation of Agriculture for twelve years. He served in the provincial cabinet as Minister of Agriculture and Forestry and Minister responsible for the P.E.I. Grain Elevators Corporation. Hammill lived in Kinkora. He died in Summerside on September 28, 2023, at the age of 91.
