= Jordan Brown (Prince Edward Island politician) =

Canadian politician

Jordan K.M. Brown

Member of the Legislative Assembly of Prince Edward Island for Charlottetown-Brighton
- In office May 4, 2015 – March 26, 2019
- Preceded by: Robert Ghiz
- Succeeded by: Ole Hammarlund

Minister of Education, Early Learning, and Culture
- In office October 23, 2017 – May 9, 2019
- Preceded by: Doug Currie
- Succeeded by: Brad Trivers

Minister of Justice, Public Safety, and Attorney General
- In office January 10, 2018 – May 9, 2019
- Preceded by: Wade MacLauchlan
- Succeeded by: Bloyce Thompson

Personal details
- Born: September 12, 1980 (age 45)
- Party: Liberal
- Occupation: Lawyer

Jordan Kent Macdonald Brown (born September 12, 1980) is a Canadian politician who represented the electoral district of Charlottetown-Brighton in the Legislative Assembly of Prince Edward Island as a member of the Liberal Party from 2015 to 2019.

== Early life and career ==
Brown studied business and economics at the University of Prince Edward Island, before attending law school at the University of New Brunswick. He was called to the bar in 2005, and practised law in Charlottetown. He is married to Amy Boswall, and has two children.

== Political career ==
In the 2015 Prince Edward Island general election, Brown was elected to represent Charlottetown-Brighton as a member of the Liberal Party. He defeated Rob Lantz, the leader of the opposing Progressive Conservative Party, by 22 votes and thus denied him a seat in the legislature. This defeat ultimately led to Lantz's resigning the party leadership.

On October 23, 2017, Brown was appointed to the Executive Council of Prince Edward Island as Minister of Education, Early Learning and Culture. On January 10, 2018, Brown was given additional roles in cabinet as Minister of Justice and Public Safety, and Attorney General.

Brown was also a member of the Standing Committee on Education and Economic Development and the Standing Committee on Health and Wellness. He previously served as a member of the Standing Committee on Public Accounts.

Brown was defeated in the 2019 election.
