= Belfast-Murray River =

Provincial electoral district in Prince Edward Island, Canada

Prince Edward Island electoral district
- Coordinates: 46.045°N 62.729°W

Provincial electoral district
- Legislature: Legislative Assembly of Prince Edward Island
MLA
Darlene Compton
Progressive Conservative
- District created: 1996
- First contested: 1996
- Last contested: 2023

Belfast-Murray River (District 4) is a provincial electoral district for the Legislative Assembly of Prince Edward Island, Canada. Created mostly from 4th Kings, part of 5th Kings and a small part of 4th Queens in 1996. It was formerly named Murray River-Gaspereaux from 1996 to 2007.

== Members ==
The riding has elected the following members of the Legislative Assembly:

Members of the Legislative Assembly for Belfast-Murray River
Assembly	Years	Member	Party
See 4th Queens, 4th Kings, 5th Kings 1873–1996
60th	1996–2000	Pat Binns	Progressive Conservative
61st	2000–2003	Pat Binns	Progressive Conservative
62nd	2003–2007	Pat Binns	Progressive Conservative
63rd	2007	Pat Binns	Progressive Conservative
63rd	2007–2011	Charlie McGeoghegan	Liberal
64th	2011–2015	Charlie McGeoghegan	Liberal
65th	2015–2019	Darlene Compton	Progressive Conservative
66th	2019–2023	Darlene Compton	Progressive Conservative
67th	2023–present	Darlene Compton	Progressive Conservative

== Election results ==
=== Belfast-Murray River, 2007–present ===
2023 Prince Edward Island general election
Party	Candidate	Votes	%	±%
Progressive Conservative	Darlene Compton	1,510	58.7	+6.1
Liberal	Katherine Bryson	520	20.2	-0.7
Green	Laverne MacInnis	420	16.3	-10.2
New Democratic	Michelle Hodgson	124	4.8	
Total valid votes		2,574	100.0	
Progressive Conservative hold		Swing		+6.2

2019 Prince Edward Island general election
Party	Candidate	Votes	%	±%
Progressive Conservative	Darlene Compton	1,545	52.5	+7.4
Green	James Sanders	781	26.6	+20.9
Liberal	Ian MacPherson	615	20.9	-20.2
Total valid votes		2,941	100.0	
Progressive Conservative hold		Swing		+7.4
Source: Elections Prince Edward Island

2015 Prince Edward Island general election
Party	Candidate	Votes	%	±%
Progressive Conservative	Darlene Compton	1,203	45.12	-0.42
Liberal	Charlie McGeoghegan	1,095	41.07	-4.79
New Democratic	Alan Hicken	216	8.10	
Green	Jordan MacPhee	152	5.70	+1.09
Total valid votes		2,666	99.63	
Total rejected ballots		10	0.37	
Turnout		2,676	85.50	
Eligible voters		3,130		

2011 Prince Edward Island general election
Party	Candidate	Votes	%	±%
Liberal	Charlie McGeoghegan	1,135	45.86	-9.09
Progressive Conservative	Darlene Compton	1,127	45.54	+9.39
Green	John Burhoe	114	4.61	+0.99
Island	Andy Clarey	99	4.00	-0.67
Total valid votes		2,475	100.0	
Liberal hold		Swing		-9.24

Prince Edward Island provincial by-election, 15 October 2007 On the appointment of Pat Binns as Ambassador to Ireland
Party	Candidate	Votes	%	±%
Liberal	Charlie McGeoghegan	1,259	54.95	+14.14
Progressive Conservative	Darlene Compton	828	36.15	−19.01
Independent	Andy Clarey	107	4.67	
Green	Ahmon Katz	83	3.62	−0.42
New Democratic	Jane McNeil	10	0.44	
Total valid votes		2,287	100.0	
Liberal gain from Progressive Conservative		Swing		+16.58
Source: Elections PEI

2007 Prince Edward Island general election
Party	Candidate	Votes	%	±%
Progressive Conservative	Pat Binns	1,527	55.15	-15.13
Liberal	Charlie McGeoghegan	1,130	40.81	+13.08
Green	Ahmon Katz	112	4.04	
Total valid votes		2,769	100.0	
Progressive Conservative hold		Swing		-14.10

==== 2016 electoral reform plebiscite results ====
2016 Prince Edward Island electoral reform referendum
Side	Votes	%
First Past the Post	397	35.26
Mixed Member Proportional	342	30.37
Dual Member Proportional Representation	231	20.52
Preferential Voting	100	8.88
First Past the Post plus leaders	56	4.97
Two-choice preferred result
Mixed Member Proportional	558	52.94
First Past the Post	496	47.06
Total votes cast	1,126	35.90
Registered voters	3,153	
Source "Plebiscite Report" (PDF). Archived from the original (PDF) on 1 December 2017.

=== Murray River-Gaspereaux, 1996–2007 ===
2003 Prince Edward Island general election
Party	Candidate	Votes	%	±%
Progressive Conservative	Pat Binns	1,584	70.28	+0.66
Liberal	Michelle Johnston	625	27.73	-0.94
New Democratic	Edith Perry	45	2.00	+0.29
Total valid votes		2,254	100.0	
Progressive Conservative hold		Swing		+0.80

2000 Prince Edward Island general election
Party	Candidate	Votes	%	±%
Progressive Conservative	Pat Binns	1,668	69.62	+16.04
Liberal	Andy Clarey	687	28.67	-13.16
New Democratic	Deborah Kelly Hawkes	41	1.71	-2.87
Total valid votes		2,396	100.0	
Progressive Conservative hold		Swing		+14.60

1996 Prince Edward Island general election
Party	Candidate	Votes	%
Progressive Conservative	Pat Binns	1,309	53.58
Liberal	Barry W. Hicken	1,022	41.83
New Democratic	Alan Neil Hicken	112	4.58
Total valid votes		2,443	100.0
This riding was created from parts of the dual-member ridings of 4th Queens, 4th Kings and 5th Kings.

== See also ==
- List of Prince Edward Island provincial electoral districts
- Canadian provincial electoral districts
