= Kevin MacAdam =

Canadian politician

Kevin J. MacAdam

Member of the Legislative Assembly of Prince Edward Island for Morell-Fortune Bay
- In office February 26, 2001 – February 17, 2006
- Preceded by: Himself
- Succeeded by: Olive Crane
- In office November 18, 1996 – October 19, 2000
- Preceded by: Riding Established
- Succeeded by: Himself

Personal details
- Born: February 28, 1967 (age 59) West St. Peters, Prince Edward Island
- Party: Progressive Conservative

Kevin Joseph MacAdam (born February 28, 1967) is a Canadian political advisor and former politician.

Born in West Saint Peters, the son of Stephen MacAdam, he was educated at the University of Prince Edward Island, and worked as a researcher and analyst.

== Political career ==
MacAdam was a member of the Legislative Assembly of Prince Edward Island from 1996 to 2006, representing the electoral district of Morell-Fortune Bay as a member of the Progressive Conservative Party. At the age of 29, he was named Minister of Fisheries, becoming the youngest cabinet minister in the history of Prince Edward Island.

MacAdam also stood as the federal Progressive Conservative candidate in Cardigan in the 2000 federal election, losing to Lawrence MacAulay by a margin of less than 300 votes. He resigned his seat in the provincial assembly to run for the federal seat but was reelected to the assembly in a subsequent by-election.

== Political advisor ==
MacAdam resigned from public office and left provincial politics in the spring of 2006 to serve as a political advisor to Peter MacKay, the federal minister responsible for Prince Edward Island.

== Electoral record ==
2000 Canadian federal election: Cardigan
Party	Candidate	Votes	%	±%
Liberal	Lawrence MacAulay	8,545	48.06	+3.01
Progressive Conservative	Kevin MacAdam	8,269	46.51	+2.05
Alliance	Darrell Hickox	500	2.81	
New Democratic	Deborah Kelly Hawkes	465	2.62	-7.88
Total valid votes		17,779	100.00	
