= Dennis King (politician) =

Canadian politician

His Excellency the Honourable Dennis King
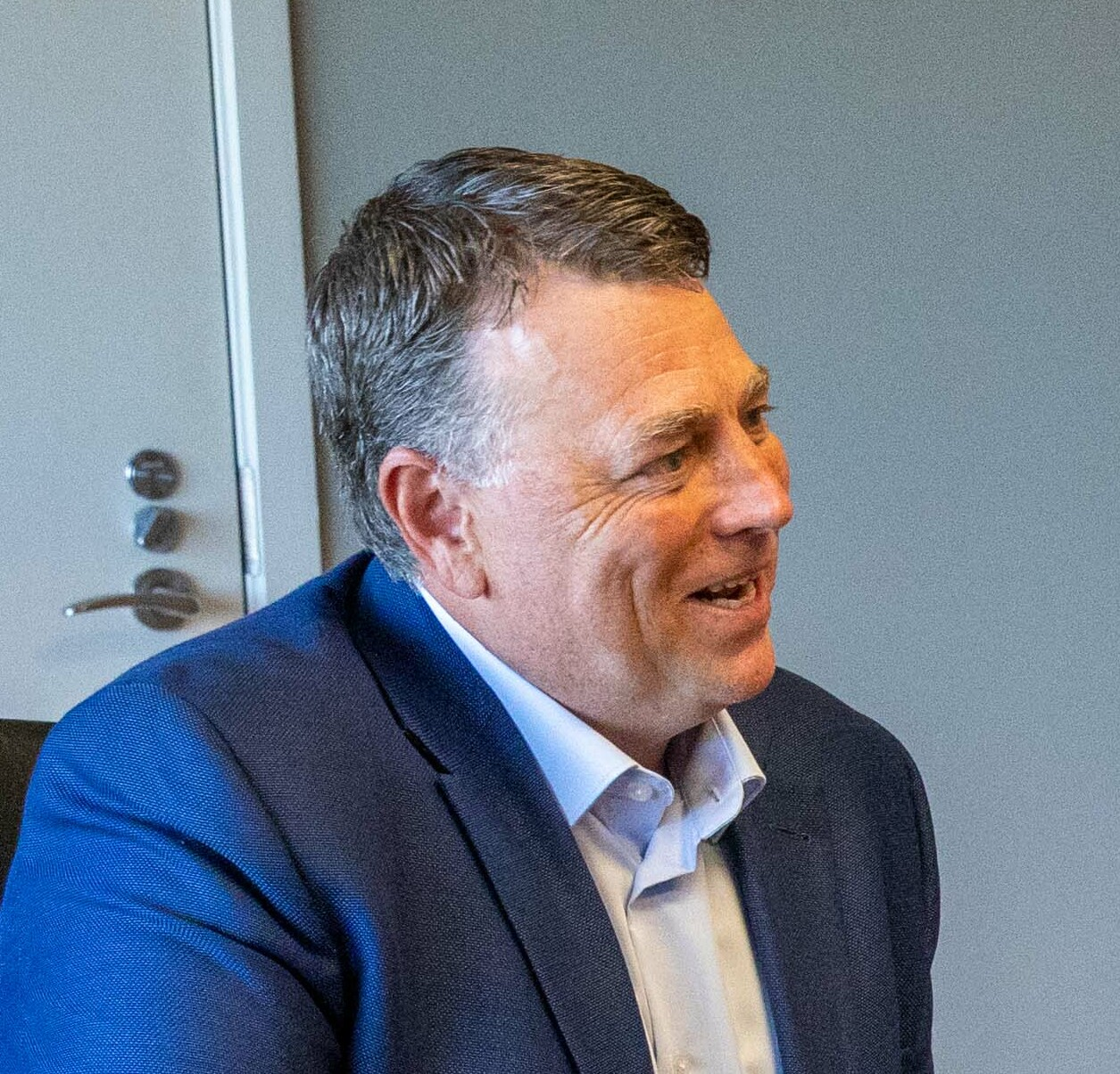
- King in 2021

Canadian Ambassador to Ireland
- Incumbent
- Assumed office March 3, 2025
- Prime Minister: Justin Trudeau; Mark Carney
- Preceded by: Nancy Smyth

33rd Premier of Prince Edward Island
- In office May 9, 2019 – February 21, 2025
- Monarchs: Elizabeth II; Charles III
- Lieutenant Governor: Antoinette Perry; Wassim Salamoun
- Deputy: Darlene Compton (2019–2023); Bloyce Thompson (2023–2025)
- Preceded by: Wade MacLauchlan
- Succeeded by: Rob Lantz

Leader of the Progressive Conservative Party of Prince Edward Island
- In office February 9, 2019 – February 21, 2025
- Preceded by: James Aylward
- Succeeded by: Rob Lantz (interim)

Member of the Legislative Assembly of Prince Edward Island for Brackley-Hunter River
- In office April 23, 2019 – February 21, 2025
- Preceded by: Riding established
- Succeeded by: Kent Dollar

Personal details
- Born: November 1, 1971 (age 55) Georgetown, Prince Edward Island, Canada
- Party: Progressive Conservative Party of Prince Edward Island
- Spouse: Jana Hemphill (m. 1999)
- Children: 3

Dennis King (born November 1, 1971) is a Canadian politician and diplomat currently serving as the Canadian ambassador to Ireland. Previously, King served as the 33rd premier of Prince Edward Island, leader of the Progressive Conservative Party of Prince Edward Island, and MLA for Brackley-Hunter River from 2019 to 2025.

== Early life ==
Born in Georgetown, Prince Edward Island, King worked in many Prince Edward Island media outlets for years, including the Eastern Graphic, The Guardian and CFCY-FM. In 1997, he started work as a public relations coordinator for the Ministry of Transportation, then became director of communications for the Department of Development and Technology, and finally director of communications and executive assistant to the 30th premier of Prince Edward Island, Pat Binns.

== Political career ==
On February 9, 2019, King was elected leader of the Progressive Conservative Party of Prince Edward Island, at the party's leadership convention in Charlottetown. King led his party to win a plurality of seats in the Legislative Assembly of Prince Edward Island following the 2019 Prince Edward Island general election and won his seat in the district of Brackley-Hunter River. His party won 12 seats overall.

=== Premier of Prince Edward Island (2019–2025) ===
On April 30, 2019, King was invited by Lieutenant Governor Antoinette Perry to form a minority government and was sworn in as premier on May 9, 2019. With a victory in a November 2020 by-election, the PCs became a majority government. In March 2023, King announced an early election that was held on April 3, 2023. King and the Progressive Conservative Party won a majority government in the election, increasing their majority.

On February 20, 2025, King announced his intention to resign as premier, leader of the Progressive Conservative Party, and MLA as of noon AST, February 21, 2025.

King was announced as the next appointee for Canada's ambassador to Ireland on March 3, 2025. The by-election for his provincial seat was held on August 12, 2025.

== Personal life ==
King is the author of two books: The Day They Shot Reveen: Stories from a PEI Small Town (2016) and The Legend of Bubby Stevens (2017). He has been married to Jana Hemphill since 1999; together, they have three children.

== Electoral record ==
2023 Prince Edward Island general election: Brackley-Hunter River
| Party | Candidate | Votes | % | ±% |
|---|---|---|---|---|
| Progressive Conservative | Dennis King | 1,902 | 68.20 | +26.60 |
| Green | Greg Bradley | 483 | 17.30 | -10.60 |
| Liberal | Nicole Ford | 321 | 11.50 | -17.0 |
| New Democratic | Leah-Jane Hayward | 83 | 3.0 | +2.20 |
| Total valid votes | | 2805 | | |
| Total rejected ballots | | 15 | 0.53 | |
| Turnout | | 2,820 | | |
| Progressive Conservative hold | | Swing | | +26.20 |
