= Olive Crane =

Canadian politician

M. Olive Crane

MLA for Morell-Fortune Bay
- In office March 20, 2006 – June 12, 2007
- Preceded by: Kevin MacAdam
- Succeeded by: riding dissolved

MLA for Morell-Mermaid
- In office June 12, 2007 – May 4, 2015
- Preceded by: new district
- Succeeded by: Sidney MacEwen

Interim leader of the Progressive Conservative Party of Prince Edward Island
- In office September 4, 2007 – May 26, 2010
- Preceded by: Pat Binns
- Succeeded by: Jim Bagnall (interim)

Leader of the Progressive Conservative Party of Prince Edward Island
- In office October 2, 2010 – January 31, 2013
- Preceded by: Jim Bagnall (interim)
- Succeeded by: Steven Myers (interim)

Personal details
- Born: October 28, 1957 (age 69)

Mary Olive Crane (born 28 October 1957) is a Canadian politician and social worker from Douglas Station, Prince Edward Island. She was the leader of the Progressive Conservative Party of Prince Edward Island from 2007 to 2010 on an interim basis and 2010 to 2013 on a permanent basis. She was also leader of the Official Opposition in the Legislative Assembly of Prince Edward Island from 2007 to 2010 and 2010 to 2013.

== Biography ==
A native of Morell, Prince Edward Island, Crane is a graduate of Dalhousie University. She is a career civil servant, working as a social worker for the provincial government since 1979. She has worked in a variety of departments from Health & Social Services, Office of the Attorney General to Agriculture, Fisheries and Aquaculture. She was elected to the Legislative Assembly of Prince Edward Island on March 20, 2006 in the by-election for District 2, Morell-Fortune Bay, and re-elected to the Legislature on May 28, 2007 representing District 7, Morell-Mermaid. Following the 2007 election, she was appointed the Opposition Critic for Health, Education, the Status of Women, and Communities, Cultural Affairs and Labour.

On September 4, 2007 she was appointed the interim leader of the Progressive Conservative Party of Prince Edward Island, She was the fifth woman to serve as leader/interim leader of a PEI political party (after Leone Bagnall, Pat Mella, Catherine Callbeck and Sharon Labchuk).

On May 26, 2010, Olive Crane resigned as interim leader of the Progressive Conservative Party of Prince Edward Island and announced her intentions to seek the permanent leadership. On October 2, 2010, she won the leadership of the PEI Progressive Conservative Party on the second ballot, defeating her main opponent, Jamie Ballem. Crane led the party in the 2011 election, receiving 40 per cent of the vote and winning five seats. She was also re-elected in her Morell-Mermaid riding.

On December 5, 2012, Crane announced her resignation as leader of the party effective January 31, 2013.

On October 4, 2013, Crane was ejected from the Progressive Conservative caucus, one day after giving an interview concerning the defection of Hal Perry, the Progressive Conservative MLA for Tignish-Palmer Road, to the Liberals. According to Steven Myers, the interim Progressive Conservative leader, this interview was a violation of a promise, made at a meeting prior to the interview, that Progressive Conservative MLAs would not speak to the media about Perry's defection.

Crane did not reoffer as a candidate in the 2015 election. In July 2015, Crane was hired by the Liberal government as a labour market specialist in the Department of Workforce and Advanced Learning.

In 2018, Crane began working for the Abegweit First Nation. As of 2025, Crane serves as the First Nation's Director of Intergovernmental Affairs and Strategic Planning.

== Personal life ==
Crane married Paul Affleck in 1983. They have three children.

She is the sister of Dody Crane, the former leader of the Prince Edward Island New Democratic Party.

== Election results ==
2007 Prince Edward Island general election: Morell-Mermaid
Party	Candidate	Votes	%	±%
Progressive Conservative	Olive Crane	1,384	46.46	−6.73
Liberal	Doug Deacon	941	31.59	−13.71
Independent	Larry McGuire	560	18.80	
New Democratic	Mike Avery	94	3.16	+1.65
Total valid votes		2,979	100.0	
Progressive Conservative hold		Swing		+3.49

2011 Prince Edward Island general election: Morell-Mermaid
Party	Candidate	Votes	%	±%
Progressive Conservative	Olive Crane	1,649	58.29	+11.83
Liberal	Dan MacDonald	1,033	36.51	+4.93
Green	Darcie Lanthier	114	4.03	
Island	Roger Nowe	33	1.17	
Total valid votes		2,829	100.0	
Progressive Conservative hold		Swing		+3.45
