= Robert Ghiz =

Canadian politician (born 1974)

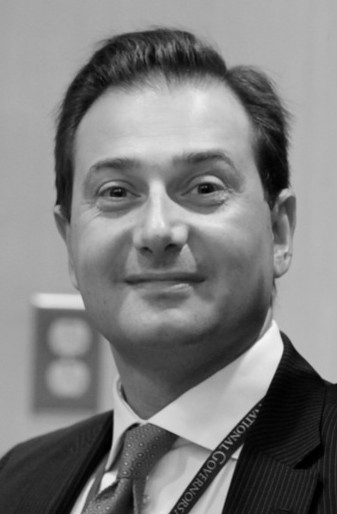
- Ghiz in 2010

31st Premier of Prince Edward Island
- In office June 12, 2007 – February 23, 2015
- Monarch: Elizabeth II
- Lieutenant Governor: Barbara A. Hagerman; Frank Lewis
- Deputy: George T. Webster (2010–2015)
- Preceded by: Pat Binns
- Succeeded by: Wade MacLauchlan

Member of the Legislative Assembly of Prince Edward Island for Charlottetown-Brighton Charlottetown-Rochford Square (2003–2007)
- In office September 29, 2003 – February 24, 2015
- Preceded by: Jeff Lantz
- Succeeded by: Jordan Brown

Leader of the Prince Edward Island Liberal Party
- In office April 5, 2003 – February 21, 2015
- Preceded by: Ron MacKinley (interim)
- Succeeded by: Wade MacLauchlan

Personal details
- Born: Robert Watson Joseph Ghiz; January 21, 1974 (age 52) Charlottetown, Prince Edward Island, Canada
- Party: Liberal
- Spouse: Kate Ellis (m. 2006)
- Children: 3
- Parent: Joe Ghiz (father)
- Education: Bishop's University
- Occupation: Political adviser, banker
- Cabinet: Minister Responsible for Intergovernmental Affairs (2007–15); Minister Responsible for Acadian and Francophone Affairs (2007–15); Minister Responsible for Aboriginal Affairs (2007–15)

Robert Watson Joseph Ghiz (born January 21, 1974) is a Canadian politician who served as the 31st premier of Prince Edward Island from 2007 to 2015. He is the son of the 27th premier, Joe Ghiz.

== Life and career ==
Ghiz was born and raised in Charlottetown, Prince Edward Island, the son of Rose Ellen (born McGowan) and Joe Ghiz. He served in the Canadian Forces Primary Reserves, while attending high school in the early 1990s. He attended Bishop's University where he earned a bachelor's degree in political science; his father spoke at Ghiz's graduation.

Ghiz moved to Ottawa following his father's death from cancer, where he worked as a political aide for Deputy Prime Minister Sheila Copps before joining the Bank of Nova Scotia in 1998. In 2001 Ghiz joined the office of Prime Minister Jean Chrétien where he served as Atlantic Canada advisor before leaving to run for leader of the Prince Edward Island Liberal Party in 2003.

== Politics ==
In 2003, Ghiz narrowly defeated former provincial Health Minister Alan Buchanan for the leadership of the party and went on to win a seat in the Legislative Assembly of Prince Edward Island in the 2003 provincial election. The MLA for Charlottetown-Rochford Square (now Charlottetown-Brighton) served as Leader of the Official Opposition in the provincial legislature from 2003 to 2007.

Ghiz faced a controversy during the lead-up to the 2007 provincial election when he intervened in the nominating procedure in a rural electoral district northeast of Charlottetown. Ghiz refused to sign his party's nominating papers for the winning candidate who had made a controversial speech endorsing patronage.

Ghiz led his party to power in the general election held on May 28, 2007, defeating Pat Binns after 11 years of Progressive Conservative government. Ghiz won 23 of the 27 seats, reversing the standings in the legislature at the time of dissolution. Ghiz and his 11-member cabinet were sworn in on June 12, 2007. A 24th member was elected in October in a by-election held after the resignation of Pat Binns.

Ghiz's election resulted in the second time in the history of Prince Edward Island that a father-son team both became premier; the other pair (also Liberal) being Thane Campbell (1936–1943) and Alexander B. Campbell (1966–1978).

In early 2011, he was featured in an episode of CBC Television's Make the Politician Work.

On October 3, 2011, the Ghiz Liberals were elected to a second term, winning 22 of 27 seats. The PEI Progressive Conservative party under the leadership of Olive Crane won the remaining 5 seats.

Following the 2011 provincial election Ghiz announced that he would find a high-level position for Allan Campbell, who had lost his seat during the election. Campbell was later appointed Chief of Staff in the Premier's Office.

On November 13, 2014, Ghiz announced he would be resigning as Premier as soon as the Liberal Party elected a new leader. Ghiz resigned as Premier on February 23, 2015, and was succeeded by the new Liberal Party leader, Wade MacLauchlan. He resigned his seat in the Legislative Assembly of Prince Edward Island the next day.

== Life after politics ==
In June 2016, Ghiz joined the international law firm Gowling WLG in a business advisory role. By November of the same year it was announced that he would step into the role vacated by former New Brunswick premier Bernard Lord when Ghiz was hired to take over the leadership as CEO of the Canadian Wireless Telecommunications Association in the new year. On May 3, 2023, the CWTA changed its name to Canadian Telecommunications Association.
