= 2005 Prince Edward Island electoral reform referendum =

Canadian provincial referendum

Prince Edward Island Referendum on Electoral Reform, 2005
November 28, 2005	2016 →
- Should Prince Edward Island change to the Mixed Member Proportional System as presented by the Commission of PEI's Electoral Future?

Results
Choice	Votes	%
Yes	11,750	36.42%
No	20,515	63.58%
Valid votes	32,265	100.00%
Invalid or blank votes	0	0.00%
Total votes	32,265	100.00%

A referendum was held in the Canadian province of Prince Edward Island on November 28, 2005, to determine whether to adopt the Mixed Member Proportional (MMP) system as recommended by the Prince Edward Island Electoral Reform Commission in 2003.

The referendum failed, with "Yes" receiving only 36.42% of the popular vote.

However, a subsequent nonbinding plebiscite in November 2016 resulted in a vote of 52.4% in favour of MMP vs. 42.5% for the First-past-the-post system. This was followed by a referendum pitting FPTP and MMP against each other in conjunction with the April 23, 2019 provincial election. The result of that referendum was 49% for MMP vs. 51% for FPTP, but neither side reached the threshold of a majority in 60% of the seats for the referendum to be binding.

== Results ==
The question asked was: Should Prince Edward Island change to the Mixed Member Proportional System as presented by the Commission of PEI's Electoral Future?

Option		Popular Vote		Districts carried	
Option		#	%	#	%
X	No	20,515	63.58%	25	92.59%
	Yes*	11,750	36.42%	2	7.41%
Total		32,265	100.0%	27	100.0%

* In order to pass, the referendum had to receive 60% of the province-wide popular vote and a simple majority in 60% (16 of 27) of the electoral districts.

== Analysis ==
The referendum was held in response to some extraordinarily lopsided results in PEI from the first-past-the post system - cases where the opposition was reduced to only one or two seats despite having a combined 45% share of the vote. The referendum failed to pass by a vote of 64% to 36% in favour of the status quo for a number of reasons, but for Jeannie Lea, the primary lesson to be learned appears to be the need for a referendum such as this to be done as a two-step process, in which the first step is to ask whether a change is considered desirable and the second step involves the choice of a specific model, as was done successfully in New Zealand under the 1992/93 referendum. Otherwise, a bias is created because some people will vote against the proposed because they would prefer something somewhat different. On the other hand, in a 2018 referendum held in the Canadian province of British Columbia, which included a two step question, the voters rejected switching to proportional representation (PR) voting by a similar (61% to 39%) margin.
