= Pat Binns =

Canadian diplomat (born 1948)

Pat Binns BA, MA

27th Canadian Ambassador to Ireland
- In office August 30, 2007 – November 19, 2010
- Preceded by: Carl Schwenger
- Succeeded by: Loyola Hearn

30th Premier of Prince Edward Island
- In office November 27, 1996 – June 12, 2007
- Monarch: Elizabeth II
- Lieutenant Governor: Gilbert Clements; Léonce Bernard; Barbara A. Hagerman
- Preceded by: Keith Milligan
- Succeeded by: Robert Ghiz

Leader of the Progressive Conservative Party of Prince Edward Island
- In office May 4, 1996 – August 30, 2007
- Preceded by: Pat Mella
- Succeeded by: Olive Crane (interim)

Assemblyman of the Legislative Assembly of Prince Edward Island for 4th Kings
- In office April 24, 1978 – August 3, 1984
- Preceded by: Charles Fraser
- Succeeded by: Stanley Bruce

Member of the Legislative Assembly of Prince Edward Island for Belfast-Murray River Murray River-Gaspereaux (1996-2007)
- In office November 18, 1996 – August 30, 2007
- Preceded by: Riding Established
- Succeeded by: Charlie McGeoghegan

Member of Parliament for Cardigan
- In office September 4, 1984 – November 21, 1988
- Preceded by: Bennett Campbell
- Succeeded by: Lawrence MacAulay

Personal details
- Born: Patrick George Binns; October 8, 1948 (age 78) Weyburn, Saskatchewan, Canada
- Party: Progressive Conservative Party of Prince Edward Island
- Other political affiliations: Progressive Conservative
- Spouse: Carol MacMillan (m. 1971)
- Children: 4
- Education: University of Alberta
- Occupation: development officer, civil servant, farmer and businessperson
- Profession: Politician, Diplomat
- Cabinet: Provincial: Minister of Municipal Affairs (1979–1980); Minister of Labour (1979–1980); Minister of Environment (1979–1980); Minister of Community Affairs (1980–1982); Minister of Fisheries (1982–1983); Minister of Industry (1983–1984) Federal: Parliamentary Secretary to the Minister of Fisheries (1986–1988)

Patrick George Binns (born October 8, 1948) is a Canadian diplomat, the 30th premier of Prince Edward Island from 1996 to 2007 and Canadian Ambassador to Ireland from 2007 to 2010.

Binns has a long history of public service, most notably being the 30th Premier of PEI for 11 years, during which time he was the leader of the Progressive Conservative Party of Prince Edward Island.

During his premiership, Binns was known as the province's "affable and unassuming premier."

He also served as Canada's Consul General in Boston, Massachusetts.

== Before the premiership ==
Binns was born in Weyburn, Saskatchewan, and graduated from the University of Alberta in 1969 with a Bachelor of Arts. In 1971, he earned a Master of Arts in Community Development while working for the government of Alberta as a community development officer. In 1972, Binns began working for the Prince Edward Island Rural Development Council and met and married Carol MacMillan of Stratford, PEI. While working for the P.E.I. government from 1974 to 1978, Binns helped create and run the Regional Service Centres in the province's east. In 1978, he received the Queen's Silver Jubilee for Outstanding Public Service.

Binns entered politics in 1978 when he was elected as a MLA for the district of 4th Kings. He was subsequently re-elected in 1979 and 1982, serving various portfolios as Minister of Industry (1983), Community Affairs (1980), Fisheries (1982–83), Environment (1979), Labour (1979), and Municipal Affairs (1979) under Premier James Lee.

From 1984 to 1988, Binns was the MP for Cardigan, serving as Parliamentary Secretary to the Minister of Fisheries in the Brian Mulroney government. Binns subsequently established an edible bean farm in Hopefield (Island Bean Limited) and operated a management consultant firm, Pat Binns & Associates.

== Premiership ==
=== First term (1996 to 2000) ===
Binns entered the provincial PC Party leadership race to succeed Patricia Mella in 1996 and won a convincing first ballot victory on May 5 over Charlottetown businessman Wes MacAleer and O'Leary Veterinarian Dr. Gary Morgan. He immediately set about organizing the party for an election expected within months. Binns took over a party with only a single member in the 32 seat Provincial Legislature. Binns campaigned on a platform of strengthening health care and education, encouraging economic development, and energizing communities. A provincial election was planned for late May by Premier Catherine Callbeck, only to be called off by Callbeck at the last minute at a nominating convention on the night of the planned election call. Subsequent media polls showed a surge in popularity for the PC Party. Callbeck resigned shortly afterwards and a leadership convention was held in the fall, electing provincial Cabinet Minister Keith Milligan as Callbeck's successor as Liberal leader and Premier.

Binns' PC Party defeated the Liberal Party led by Milligan in the general election on November 18, 1996, gathering 18 seats to the Liberals' 8, and the NDP's 1. This was the first provincial general election contested under a new single member, 27 seat system, replacing the previous dual member, 16 seat system.

=== Second term (2000 to 2003) ===
Binns' won a second mandate in 2000 when his PC Party swept 26 of 27 seats, leaving a single opposition Liberal in the legislature. Both Liberal Party Leader Wayne Carew and NDP Leader Dr. Herb Dickieson were defeated.

The second term of the Binns government saw continued economic growth with new business investment, economic diversification, export and tourism growth, and construction of the Atlantic Technology Centre in Charlottetown as a catalyst for development of the burgeoning IT sector. Investments continued in education and health care for extensive school construction and repair, creation of the PEI Cancer Treatment Centre in Charlottetown and Prince County Hospital in Summerside. The province's first Freedom of Information and Protection of Privacy Act was also passed. During this time Prince Edward Island launched Waste Watch, becoming the first Canadian province to offer waste management services to every home and business resulting in a 65% waste diversion rate and closure of many community landfills. Investments were also made to expand renewable energy use with the development of the North Cape Wind Farm in West Prince, strengthening Prince Edward Island's credentials as a national leader in environmental sustainability.

Among the major issues during this period included major financial pressures in the farm sector as a result of plant disease, overcapacity and closure of the US border due to trade issues. The tourism industry also experienced a downturn in the face of post-9/11 travel concerns and rising energy prices.

In 2001, Binns' government inaugurated the Disability Support Program intended to provide assistive devices and social integration assistance to Islanders with disabilities. A Human Rights complaint questioned whether the program was "a service in the context of the Prince Edward Island Human Rights Act". In 2003 Binns' government commissioned the Baker Report. The report documented complaints under the DSP. Funding was restored to the DSP in 2007.

=== Third term (2003 to 2007) ===
The 2003 provincial election was held on September 29, 2003. The election date coincided with Hurricane Juan, a category 2 hurricane which swept over the central part of the province during the early morning hours, causing several million dollars in property damage and disrupting electricity service for days. The election date was not delayed or canceled, although the decision to do so rested with the Chief Electoral Officer and not the premier. Despite the weather, there was a customary high voter turnout (83%).

The election resulted in 23 Progressive Conservatives and 4 Liberals being elected, returning the PCs to Government. The Liberals were led by new leader Robert Ghiz who had replaced Interim Leader Ron MacKinley that spring. Under the leadership of Binns the PC Party won its third consecutive majority government, becoming the first Conservative Premier to accomplish this feat in over a century.

Binns' popularity was tested as the government weathered challenges on many fronts. Unpredictability in federal equalization, coupled with rising health care and energy costs and weakness in the primary and tourism sectors, put pressure on provincial finances. Clashes with the federal government over the fiscal imbalance and fisheries management continued for several years. Binns launched a Program Renewal process to streamline duplication and improve delivery of public services. The provincial public service was reduced by several hundred people as services were reorganized and administrative overlap was reduced in the health sector, evidenced by the disappearance of doctors in West Prince. These measures, along with a steadily growing economy, have led to continued improvement of public finances.

Other reforms in health included expanded used of nurse practitioners and better utilization of ground ambulance services, increased use of technology to improve service delivery, focused strategies for recruitment and retention of health care professionals, and restructuring health care delivery to accommodate the needs of an aging population.

Binns' government waited for federal ruling on same-sex marriage before allowing it in Prince Edward Island in 2004.

Binns sought an unprecedented fourth term majority during the 2007 provincial election, running on a policy of continued good governance and job creation, pointing to the Island's increased prosperity under his tenure. The Leader of the Official Opposition Robert Ghiz ran a campaign centred on the theme of change, as well as promising increased funding to health care and post-secondary education while reducing gasoline and property taxes. The Liberal Party won 23 of the 27 seats, reversing the standings in the legislature at the time of dissolution.

Had Binns won the 2007 election, he would have tied the record set by former premier Alex Campbell who is the only Prince Edward Island premier to have been elected to four consecutive terms. Binns and his cabinet resigned June 12, 2007, being succeeded by the administration led by Robert Ghiz.

On 30 August 2007, Binns resigned as the PEI Progressive Conservative Party leader and Opposition leader, upon being named Ambassador of Canada to Ireland by Prime Minister Stephen Harper. In 2010 Binns accepted an appointment in Boston, Massachusetts, as Canadian Consul General to New England, replacing Neil LeBlanc.

== Personal life ==
He is the father of Rob, Mark, Brad, and Lilly Binns.

Binns has six grandchildren, Kristen, Andrew, Olivia, Jackson, Elodie and Lachlan and resides with his wife Carol on the family farm in Hopefield, Prince Edward Island.

== Electoral record (partial) ==
2007 Prince Edward Island general election
Party	Candidate	Votes	%	±%
Progressive Conservative	Pat Binns	1,527	55.15%	
Liberal	Charlie McGeoghegan	1,130	40.81%	
Green	Ahmon Katz	112	4.04%	

2003 Prince Edward Island general election
Party	Candidate	Votes	%	±%
Progressive Conservative	Pat Binns	1,584	70.28	+0.66
Liberal	Michelle Johnston	625	27.73	-0.94
New Democratic	Edith Perry	45	2.00	+0.29
Total valid votes		2,254	100.0	
Progressive Conservative hold		Swing		+0.80

2000 Prince Edward Island general election
Party	Candidate	Votes	%	±%
Progressive Conservative	Pat Binns	1,668	69.62	+16.04
Liberal	Andy Clarey	687	28.67	-13.16
New Democratic	Deborah Kelly Hawkes	41	1.71	-2.87
Total valid votes		2,396	100.0	
Progressive Conservative hold		Swing		+14.60

1996 Prince Edward Island general election
Party	Candidate	Votes	%
Progressive Conservative	Pat Binns	1,309	53.58
Liberal	Barry W. Hicken	1,022	41.83
New Democratic	Alan Neil Hicken	112	4.58
Total valid votes		2,443	100.0
This riding was created from parts of the dual-member ridings of 4th Queens, 4th Kings and 5th Kings.

1988 Canadian federal election: Cardigan
Party	Candidate	Votes	%	±%
Liberal	Lawrence MacAulay	9,325	51.62	+9.48
Progressive Conservative	Pat Binns	7,936	43.93	-9.43
New Democratic	Gertrude Partridge	805	4.46	-0.04
Total valid votes		18,066	100.00	

1984 Canadian federal election: Cardigan
Party	Candidate	Votes	%	±%
Progressive Conservative	Pat Binns	10,566	53.36	+6.44
Liberal	Bennett Campbell	8,344	42.14	-6.90
New Democratic	Lorne Cudmore	891	4.50	+0.45
Total valid votes		19,801	100.00	

1978 Prince Edward Island general election: 4th Kings Assemblyman
Party	Candidate	Votes	%
Progressive Conservative	Pat Binns	1,254	49.74
Liberal	Charles James Fraser	1,179	46.77
New Democratic	Garry Herring	88	3.49
Total valid votes		2,521	100.00
Rejected, unmarked and declined ballots		70	
Turnout		2,591	89.22
Electors on the lists		2,904	
Source: Report of the Chief Electoral Officer of Prince Edward Island for the Provincial General Election: April 24, 1978.
