= Mixed-member proportional representation =

Type of mixed electoral system

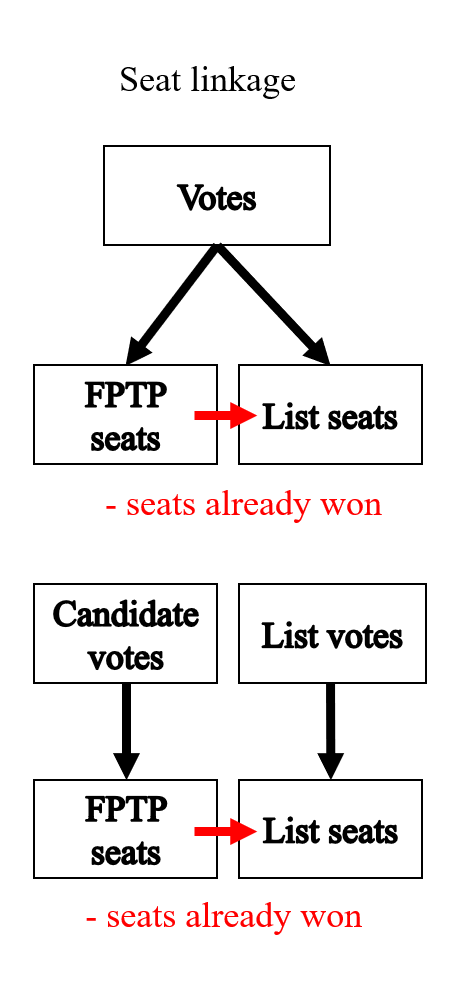
Seat linkage as shown here are the main methods that MMP systems use to achieve proportional results. The first MMP system, still used today in Denmark, uses a mixed single vote (top). The two-vote MMP (below) is more common, being used in New Zealand and other places. However it is more vulnerable to manipulation.

Use of MMP systems: MMP at the national level (purple); German MMP (blue); MMP in some regional elections (lavender); Incomplete MMP (pink); Former use (red)

Mixed-member proportional representation (MMP or MMPR) is a type of representation provided by some mixed electoral systems which combine local winner-take-all elections with a compensatory tier with party lists, in a way that produces proportional representation overall. Like proportional representation, MMP is not a single system, but a principle and goal of several similar systems. Some systems designed to achieve proportionality are still called MMP, even if they generally fall short of full proportionality in practice. In this case, they are said to provide semi-proportional representation.

In typical MMP systems, voters cast two votes (preferences): one to decide the representative for their single-seat constituency, and one for a list of a political party. Some countries use single vote variants of MMP. Seats in the legislature are filled first by the successful constituency candidates, and second, by party candidates based on the percentage of nationwide or region-wide votes that each party received. The constituency representatives are usually elected using first-past-the-post voting (FPP). The nationwide or regional party representatives are allocated similarly to party-list proportional representation. To gain a nationwide representative, parties may be required to achieve a minimum number of constituency seats, a minimum percentage of the nationwide party vote (threshold), or both.

MMP differs from mixed-member majoritarian representation (often achieved by parallel voting) in that the nationwide seats are allocated to political parties in a compensatory manner in order to achieve proportional election results across all seats (not just the additional seats). Under MMP, two parties that each receive 25% of the votes end up with about 25% of the seats, even if one party wins more constituency seats than the other. Depending on the exact system implemented in a country and the results of a particular election, the proportionality of an election may vary. Overhang seats may reduce the proportionality of the system, although this can be compensated for by allocating additional party list seats to cover any proportionality gap.

The specific system of New Zealand for electing its parliament is known as MMP, while in other countries similar systems are known under other names.

== Other names ==
The seat linkage compensatory mixed system, often referred to as MMP originates in Germany. It was later adopted with modifications under the name of MMP in New Zealand. In Germany, it was differentiated from a different compensatory mixed system at the time by always being known as personalized proportional representation (PPR) (German: personalisiertes Verhältniswahlrecht).

Since the variants used in Germany almost always produce very proportional results, the proportionality is emphasized over the mixed nature of the electoral system, and it is essentially considered a localized or personalized form of PR, used instead of conventional open-list systems. Germany's modified federal election system from 2025 does not allow overhang seats at all (such seats are re-allocated to other parties), therefore not all local districts are guaranteed to elect the plurality winner. In German, this localized list system now shares the name of PPR with the mixed systems still used in the federal states of Germany that are referred to as MMP in English. In English, due to this change, the system is no longer considered to be MMP in the sense of a mixed member system combining proportional and district-level first-past-the-post voting, but it is seen as a personalized/localized version of PR. As it retains the individual candidate vote in a clearly distinct fashion from open-list systems, it may still be considered mixed-member proportional in the sense of a proportional system having two kinds of elected members: some (may be) elected by personal (candidate) votes, some elected by (closed list) party votes.

Previously, the federal elections used a flexible number of additional compensatory seats, also known as leveling seats, which essentially guaranteed mixed-member proportional representation even with extremely disproportional constituency results, but dramatically increased the size of the Bundestag. This meant that it was potentially the most proportional MMP system used after the one in New Zealand, where only top ups are seats given to other parties to compensate for a party taking overhang seats, which resulted in minor flexibility of the parliament size.

In the Canadian province of Quebec, where an MMP model was studied in 2007, it is called the compensatory mixed-member voting system (système mixte avec compensation or SMAC). In the United Kingdom the sometimes less proportional implementation of MMP used in Scotland and the London Assembly is referred to as the additional member system. In South Africa, MMP is generally referred to as a "mixed system". The Scandinavian countries have a long history of using both multi-member districts (members elected through party-list PR) and nationally-based compensatory top-up seats using the same method as MMP, however because the local MPs are also elected using PR, these systems are not usually considered MMP as they are not mixed systems.

Some mixed electoral systems are so different that there is no consensus on their classification as mixed-member proportional (MMP), mixed majoritarian or something between the two. These cases include partially or conditionally compensatory systems such as those of Hungary, Mexico and South Korea, which are typically said to be supermixed systems or partially compensatory systems, but sometimes inaccurately referred to as MMP even though they are highly disproportional. Some experts prefer the term "mixed member compensatory" (MMC) over MMP.

== Procedures ==
Results of the 2021 German federal election. The image shows both the seats directly won by constituency representatives and those gained via party lists. For example, the FDP (yellow) did not win a single constituency; all its 92 MPs were elected on party lists.

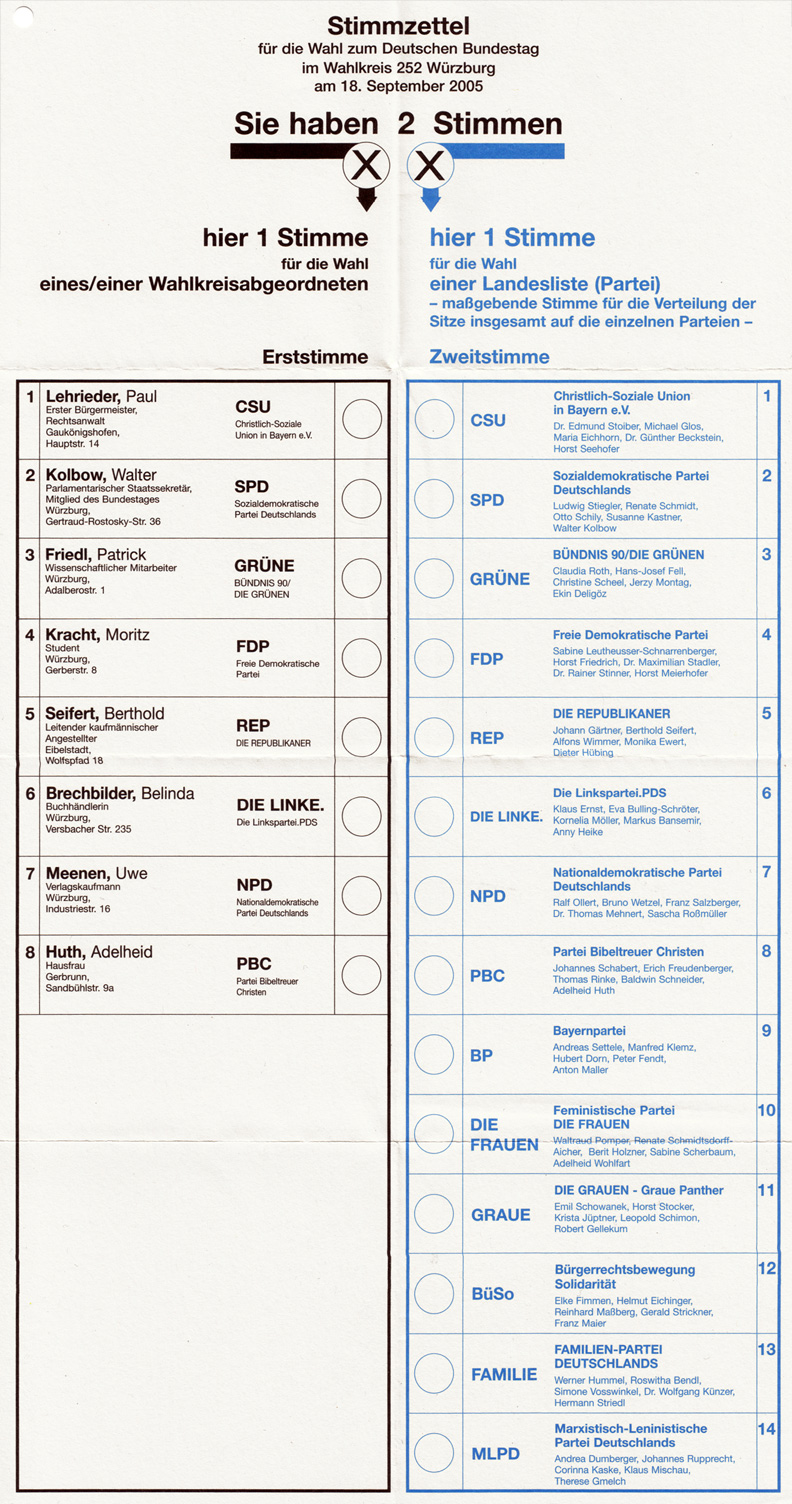
Ballot for electoral district 252, Würzburg, for the 2005 German federal election. Constituency vote on left, party list vote on right.

In MMP, the voter typically casts two votes: one for a constituency representative and one for a party. In the original variant used in Germany, citizens gave only one vote, so that voting for a representative automatically meant also voting for the representative's party, which is still used in some MMP elections today and is more robust against tactical voting than typical two-vote versions. Most of Germany changed to the two-vote variant to make local members of parliament (MPs) more personally accountable. Voters can thus vote for the local person they prefer for local MP without regard for party affiliation, since the partisan make-up of the legislature is determined only by the party vote. In the 2017 New Zealand election, 27.33% of voters split their vote (voted for a local candidate of a different party than their party vote) compared to 31.64% in 2014.

In each constituency, the representative is by default chosen using a single winner method (though this is not strictly necessary), typically first-past-the-post: that is, the candidate with the most votes (plurality) wins.

Most systems used closed party lists to elect the non-constituency MPs (also called list MPs). In most jurisdictions, candidates may stand for both a constituency and on a party list (referred to in New Zealand as dual candidacy). In Wales between 2006 and 2014 dual candidacy was banned, i.e. candidates were restricted to contend either for a constituency or for a party list, but not both. If a candidate is on the party list, but wins a constituency seat, they do not receive two seats; they are instead crossed off the party list and the party seat goes to the next candidate down.

In Bavaria, the second vote is not simply for the party but for one of the candidates on the party's regional list: Bavaria uses seven regions for this purpose. A regional open-list method was recommended for the United Kingdom by the Jenkins Commission (where it is known as AMS) and for Canada by the Law Commission of Canada; neither recommendation was ever implemented. In contrast, the open-list method of MMP was chosen in November 2016 by voters in the 2016 Prince Edward Island electoral reform referendum.

In Baden-Württemberg, there were no closed lists prior to 2022; they used the "best near-winner" method in a four-region model, where the regional members are the local candidates of the under-represented party in that region who received the most votes in their local constituency without being elected in it (Zweitmandat, literally "second mandate").

=== Apportionment methods ===
At the regional or national level (i.e. above the constituency level) several different calculation methods have been used, but the basic characteristic of the MMP is that the total number of seats in the assembly, including the single-member seats and not only the party-list ones, are allocated to parties proportionally to the number of votes the party received in the party portion of the ballot. This can be done by different apportionment methods: such as the D'Hondt method, the Sainte-Laguë method, or the percentage point method. Subtracted from each party's allocation is the number of constituency seats that party won, so that the additional seats are compensatory (top-up).

=== Dealing with overhang seats ===
If a party wins more FPTP district seats than the proportional quota received by the party-list vote, these surplus seats are called overhang seats (Überhangmandate in German), which may be an obstacle to achieving proportionality.

When a party wins more constituency seats than it would be entitled to from its proportion of (party list) votes, most systems allow for these overhang seats to be kept by those candidates who earned it in the constituency elections.

A counter-example is the Bundestag in Germany, where constituency winners may not always keep their seats in accordance with the latest modification (2023) of Germany's electoral law.

To combat disproportionalities caused by overhang seats in most German states, leveling seats (Ausgleichsmandate in German) are added to compensate for overhang seats and thereby achieve proportionality. Usually 50 percent of total seats are compensatory seats, but that proportion varies. For example, in the provincial parliament (Landtag) of North Rhine Westphalia, 29% of the seats are levelling seats, which compensate for difference between district results based on local votes and the party's share of the party vote. More may be added to balance overhangs. If a party wins more local seats than its proportion of the total party vote justifies, the size of the Landtag increases so that the total outcome is proportional to the party votes, with other parties receiving additional list seats to achieve proportionality. The leveling seats are added to the normal number of seats for the duration of the electoral period. In the German state of Bavaria, the constituency votes and party votes are combined to determine the proportional allocation of seats.

In the MMP variant used in Romania in the 2008 and 2012 legislative elections, constituency seats were only earned by the leading candidate if the candidate also achieved an absolute majority of votes in their district, thereby preventing overhang seats.

In New Zealand, all members elected for constituencies (electorate MPs) keep their seats, and electorate seats are approximately 60% of Parliament, allowing high potential for overhangs. Until 2023, Parliament ranged from the standard 120 to 123 seats, with Te Pāti Māori the most common beneficiaries of overhangs. The 2026 election returned approximately 131 seats due to low party votes for the two largest parties, uneven performance by parties in electorate votes, and prominent strategies aimed at engineering overhangs on both sides of the political spectrum. In 2012 and 2023, parliamentary commissions proposed ending overhang provisions. The commissions did not specifically anticipate 2026's circumstances nor propose reducing the ratio of electorate to party list seats. They proposed ending overhangs as a necessary part of a "package" of changes (similar packages for each commission). Alongside slightly reducing the party vote threshold (from 5% to 4% or 3.5% respectively), the commissions proposed abolishing the electorate seat threshold whereby parties winning an electorate seat would qualify for their due share of seats from the party vote. Ending this electorate seat threshold would mean any electorate seats by parties not meeting the party vote threshold would become overhang seats, thus increasing the scope for overhangs. They instead proposed that any party's electorate seat entitlements exceeding their party vote share would reduce the list seats available to other parties, a reduction of proportionality that they considered alongside other priorities. The commissions modelled their combined proposals against previous election results and found proportionality would have been similar or improved. No changes were made after the reviews. The 2026 election campaign and result saw increased calls for changes to the system.

Scotland uses a modified variant of MMP known as the additional member system where due to the nature of the calculations used to distribute the regional list seats, overhang seats are not possible; the list allocation works like a mixed-member majoritarian system, but in using the d'Hondt method's divisors to find the averages for the allocation, the first divisor for each party takes into account the number of constituency seats won by the party. Wales was similar until 2024 Senedd Reform Act.) For example, a party that won 7 constituency seats would start with a divisor of 8 (7 seats + 1 per the method's divisor formula) instead of 1. The resulting table would then give 7 seats for Scotland (and 4 seats for Wales) to the parties possessing the highest averages on the table. (Neither devolved parliament uses a table, instead using a sequential method.) MMP's compensatory effect is in the fact that a party that won constituency seats would have lower averages on the table than it would if the election used mixed-member majoritarian. Because there is no provision for overhang seats, there have been cases in Scotland and Wales where a party ended up with more seats and others with fewer total seats than their proportional entitlement.

This occurred, for example, in the South East Wales electoral region in 2007 and 2016. In 2007 Welsh Conservatives were under-represented while Independents got one more seat than they were due. In 2016 in that same electoral region, Welsh Labour was over-represented, while Plaid Cymru was under-represented. Welsh Labour has also been over-represented on this basis in every election in the South Wales West region, and every election in the South Wales Central region, apart from the 2003 election. This situation arose because Labour held an overwhelming majority of constituency seats in these regions, more than its due share proportionally. Only around one-third of the total number of seats are top-up, in the form of additional regional seats, so that is insufficient to fully compensate for Welsh Labour's over-representation.

			Parallel voting (MMM)		Broadly mixed-member proportional type of system (MMP)					
			Parallel voting (MMM)		Additional member system (AMS)		Overhang seats re-added		True MMP (with leveling seats)	
Party	Popular vote (%)	Constituencies won	Seats	Share (%)	Seats	Share (%)	Seats	Share (%)	Seats	Share (%)
Party A	43%	54	67 (54+13)	67%	54 (54+0)	54%	54 (54+0+0)	48%	71 (54+0+17)	43%
Party B	41%	11	23 (11+12)	23%	34 (11+23)	34%	41 (11+23+7)	36%	68 (11+23+34)	41%
Party C	13%	0	4 (0+4)	4%	7 (0+7)	7%	13 (0+7+6)	12%	21 (0+7+14)	13%
Party D	3%	5	6 (5+1)	6%	5 (5+0)	5%	5 (5+0+0)	4%	5 (5+0+0)	3%
TOTAL	100%	70	100 (70+30)	100%	100 (70+30)	100%	113 (70+30+13)	100%	165 (70+30+65)	100%
Index of disproportionality (Gallagher)			22.01 (disproportional)		10.25 (moderately disproportional)		4.97 (considered proportional)		0.25 (highly proportional)	
Method used			Independent PR tier		Fixed number of compensatory seats		Number of (extra) leveling seats = number of overhang seats		As many leveling seats as needed	
This type of system used in			Japan, among others		Scotland, among others		New Zealand, Germany (until 2009)		Germany (2013, 2017)	

=== Threshold ===
As in numerous proportional systems, in many MMP systems, in order to be eligible for list seats, a party must earn at least a certain percentage of the party vote, or no candidates will be elected from the party list. Candidates having won a constituency will still have won their seat. In New Zealand the threshold is 5% and in Bolivia 3%.

in Germany the threshold is 5% for elections for federal parliament and most state parliaments. And under recent changes to Germany's election law, the constituency seat may be taken away from the party.

A party that does not achieve the threshold can also be eligible for list seats if it wins at least three constituency seats in Germany, or at least one in New Zealand. Having a member with a 'safe' constituency seat is therefore a tremendous asset to a minor party in New Zealand.

In elections for the Scottish Parliament, no threshold is set. The district magnitude of each electoral region is small enough to impose an inherent threshold in the seat distribution calculations. In 2021, with regional DM of 16, the effective threshold was about 7 percent of the region's votes, or about 17,000 to 20,000 votes of the total 2.7 million valid votes cast, but each region is discrete from the other regions so if a party is spread across multiple regions, it may not win even one seat even if it has more than 40,000 votes in total. Such happened to the Alba Party in 2021.

== List of countries ==
=== Countries with MMP ===
The following countries currently have MMP representation. Countries which nominally use or have used MMP, but in practice had highly disproportional representation or it as otherwise not implemented are discussed in the next section.

Country	Legislative body	Use	Number of votes (personal and list)	Notes
(Bolivia) Bolivia	Chamber of Deputies	1994–present	Two votes	The list ballots use a double (triple) simultaneous vote with the presidential and Senate election, which is presumed to decrease tactical manipulation despite the separate candidate and list vote. The latest elections had a highly proportional result.
(Germany) Germany	State parliaments, except: (Bremen (state)) Bremen, (Hamburg) Hamburg; (Saarland) Saarland	varies by state	varies by state	Bavaria uniquely uses an open-list system for its party-list seats.
Lesotho	National Assembly	2002–present	Two votes (before 2012)	Initially used two vote version, changed to the single vote version in 2012 due to the use of decoy lists, results have been relatively proportional since.
Lesotho	National Assembly	2002–present	Single vote	Initially used two vote version, changed to the single vote version in 2012 due to the use of decoy lists, results have been relatively proportional since.
New Zealand	House of Representatives	1996–present	Two votes	It was first used in the 1996 general election, following an electoral reform process that began with the Royal Commission on the Electoral System in 1985 and ended with a referendum in 1993. The system's use was reviewed by referendum in 2011, with the majority (56.2%) voting to keep it. In the 2020 general election, the Labour Party won 65 out of 120 seats, becoming the first party under MMP to receive a majority.
(United Kingdom) United Kingdom	(Scotland) Scotland - Scottish Parliament	1999–present	Two votes	Referred to as the additional member system. Scotland is divided into regions.
(United Kingdom) United Kingdom	Local elections in: (London) London (Assembly)	2000–present	Two votes	Referred to as the additional member system.

=== Other countries ===
MMP replaced (modified):

- (Germany) Germany: Referred to as personalized proportional representation (see electoral system of Germany). Came about in 1949 as a result of inter-party bargaining. Originally used single vote version, switched to two vote version before the 1953 election. Levelling seats were established for the 2013 federal election after a ruling of Federal Constitutional Court, with a minor modification for the 2021 federal election to reduce the size of the Bundestag. The system was recently modified to an essentially (non-mixed) closed list proportional system with a local constituency vote to eliminate the need for overhang seats. In the new system, the number of seats a party can win is capped, if they "won" more seats by plurality, not all of their winners will be elected.
- Wales - Senedd (Welsh Parliament): Wales has used AMS since 1999 with 40 constituency seats, and 20 list seats in 5 regions, however, starting in 2026, the additional member system will be replaced by a closed-list proportional representation system following the approval of the Senedd Reform Bill, which will also increase the total number of seats from 60, to 96.

There are several other countries which attempted to introduce MMP by seat linkage compensation, but either not enough leveling seats were provided to achieve it, or the compensation mechanism was manipulated by decoy lists.

- Albania (formerly): A two-vote seat linkage compensation electoral system for the Parliament (Kuvendi) was used from 2001 to 2005 (after having used parallel voting in the 1996 and 1997 elections), but it was manipulated with decoy lists.
- (Tigray Region) Tigray State Council in Ethiopia: a General Election was supposed to be held in Ethiopia on 29 August 2020, but they were delayed due to the COVID-19 pandemic. But the government of Tigray dismissed the postponement and decided to create its own electoral commission and hold a regional election. On August 6, 2020, the State Council of Tigray decided to amend its constitution and change the electoral system to MMP, this will affect the upcoming regional elections. The amendment increases the number of seats in the council from 152 to 190 (+38), 80% of the seats will be filled with first-past-the-post voting and the rest 20% by proportional voting. This Tigray National Regional States law is annulled by House of Federation which is empowered to interpret the constitution for violation of the provisions of the constitution of the Federal Democratic Republic of Ethiopia.
- Republic of Korea (South Korea): From 2019 elections for the National Assembly used a two-vote hybrid system with 253 single-member constituency seats, 17 supplementary seats (a la parallel voting) and 30 compensatory seats (seat linkage). Major parties used decoy lists to neutralize compensation. Though all list seats are compensatory since 2024, but widespread use of decoy lists is expected continue and mixed-member proportional representation is not to be achieved.
- (Romania) Romania (formerly): Single vote system used in 2008 and 2012 where local candidates who did not win at least 50% of votes in their districts did not get a direct mandate, but these seats were added to the list seats allocated proportionally. Failed to achieve mixed-member proportional representation in 2012. From the 2016 elections, closed party-list proportional representation was used instead.
- (Thailand) Thailand (formerly): A single vote seat linkage system referred to as "mixed-member apportionment" was used in 2019. It used a mixed single vote for both the constituency and the party list. The 350 constituency seats are won by first-past-the-post voting as in previous elections. However, the 150 party-list seats served a compensatory function, and are allocated so as to give each party a total number of seats proportional to the nationwide number of votes they received (top-up). Overhang seats were not compensated for. The next elections were again held under parallel voting due to a change in the constitution.
- (Venezuela) Venezuela (formerly): The two vote seat linkage compensatory system introduced was designed to provide MMP, but the system was manipulated with decoy lists. The seat linkage between list and constituency representatives was removed in 2009, which changed the system to parallel voting.

Countries with systems which have been confused with mixed-member proportional representation:

- (Hungary) Hungary: Hungary was using a mixed system since the 1990s, that due to its partially compensatory nature has been sometimes inaccurately referred to as an MMP system, but it was a mixed majoritarian system, mostly independent combination of two-round voting and party-list PR. Changes after 2010 have made the system more clearly mixed-member majoritarian.
- (Mexico) Mexico: Mexico has a clearly mixed-member majoritarian system which is mostly parallel voting, however, there is a cap on how many seats any single party may get and a cap on the maximum difference of seat shares to the list vote share result. This makes it partially (conditionally) compensatory, but not MMP.
- (Myanmar) Myanmar: Starting 2025, elections to the Amyotha Hluttaw (upper house) have been incorrectly described as MMP, even though seats were awarded in a non-compensatory way, making it mixed-member majoritarian (parallel voting).
- (Zambia) Zambia: Starting 2026, elections to the National Assembly have been incorrectly described as MMP, even though seats were awarded in a non-compensatory (parallel) way based on the presidential vote share, making it mixed-member majoritarian (parallel voting).

==== Local ====
- South Africa: Local elections in all municipalities designated as metropolitan, district/county council (DC) or local/borough council (LC)

=== Proposals for use ===
==== Canada ====
In March 2004, the Law Commission of Canada proposed a system of MMP, with only 33% of MPs elected from regional open lists, for the House of Commons of Canada but Parliament's consideration of the Report in 2004–05 was stopped after the 2006 election. The New Democratic Party has been a longtime supporter of MMP. The Green Party of Canada has generally been a staunch supporter of a move to a proportional electoral system. In June 2016, the Canadian House of Commons Special Committee on Electoral Reform was formed to examine potential changes to the voting system with MMP being one of the options examined. The committee presented its report to Parliament on 1 December of the same year. In early 2017, the Government announced that it would accept only some of the committee's recommendations, and would not pursue the issue of electoral reform any further.

- Prince Edward Island: A proposal to adopt MMP with closed province-wide lists for elections to the Legislative Assembly of Prince Edward Island was defeated in a referendum in 2005, and in a subsequent referendum in 2019. In a non-binding plebiscite between 27 October and 7 November 2016, Prince Edward Islanders voted for MMP over FPTP in the final round of counting, 52%–43%; however, the provincial government, despite having set no voter turnout threshold, subsequently claimed that the 36 percent turnout was insufficient to change the electoral system. A second referendum, held simultaneously with the provincial election, saw MMP rejected by a margin of 48% in favour to 52% against, with 76% turnout.
- Ontario: In 2007, the Citizens' Assembly on Electoral Reform in Ontario, Canada, also recommended the use of MMP in future elections to the Legislative Assembly of Ontario, with a ballot similar to New Zealand's, and with the closed province-wide lists used in New Zealand but with only 30% compensatory members. A binding referendum on the proposal, held in conjunction with the provincial election on 10 October 2007, saw it defeated.
- British Columbia: During October–December 2018, British Columbia held a referendum on proportional representation, promised as part of the election platform of the British Columbia New Democratic Party who took office following the May 2017 provincial election. In the referendum citizens were presented with two questions. The first question asked them to choose whether they would like to keep first-past-the-post voting or change to proportional representation. The second question asked them to rank three types of proportional voting systems in order of preference; one of those was MMP. Citizens could still rank the voting systems even if they selected first-past-the-post voting in the first question. According to official results, voters chose FPTP over PR by 61.3% to 38.7% on the first question. While the first question was not successful for PR, the second question resulted in MMP winning over the two other systems on the ballot. If PR had been successful on the first question, MMP would have been adopted in time for the next provincial election and would have been subject to a second referendum after two election cycles.
- Quebec: In September 2019, Quebec's government, supported by two of the three opposition parties (PQ and Quebec Solidaire), introduced a referendum on MMP to be held in 2022. However, on April 28, 2021, Justice Minister Sonia LeBel informed a legislative committee hearing that the government would not move forward with a referendum on electoral reform in 2022. LeBel blamed the COVID-19 pandemic for altering the government's timeline and could not or would not commit to providing an alternate date for the referendum, effectively ending discussions about electoral reform in Quebec.

==== Other countries ====
- Brazil: Following the results of the 2026 general election, President of the Chamber of Deputies Hugo Motta proposed a debate to switch from open list proportional representation to a mixed member proportional representation beginning in 2034 with a transition to single non-transferable vote in 2030. Motta and centre-right parties aim the reduce the number of "vote-getters" from left and right-wing parties.
- Costa Rica: Costa Rica was debating the switch from the current closed party list proportional representation system to a mixed member proportional representation based on the German model. The bill presented by the Citizen Power Now movement and endorsed by the majority of parliamentary groups would create two types of deputies; 42 elected proportionally by lists presented by the political parties and would be called "national" deputies, while another 42 deputies would be elected directly by population-based electoral districts on a First past the post basis. As the bill requires a constitutional reform it would require a two-thirds majority of votes, however as of 2019 the caucuses of the four main parties supported the reform.
- Hungary: In 2017, the Common Country Movement (KOM) proposed introducing seat linkage to achieve MMP in the National Assembly, but the bill brought to parliament by five opposition parties was dismissed by the governing coalition.
- Sri Lanka: In September 2015, Sri Lankan Foreign Minister Mangala Samaraweera announced that they will change the country's system to MMP.
- South Africa: The Van Zyl Slabbert Commission on Electoral Reform (published in January 2003) recommended that a multi-member system, which has been adopted for municipal elections, be expanded to elections for the National Assembly. It proposed that 300 of 400 members be elected from closed-constituency lists (from 69 national multi-member constituencies) and 100 members from closed, national-level party lists. Parliament's High Level Panel report of 2017, chaired by former president Kgalema Motlanthe, validated the Van Zyl Slabbert mixed-system and recommended its adoption, stating: "Such a system will serve to limit the power of individual party leaders and encourage MPs to vote in accordance with the needs and desires of their constituencies rather than only following party lines". Although a constitutional amendment is not required, and a simple majority in parliament can amend the Electoral Act (No. 73 of 1998) it seems unlikely that such an amendment will come before parliament before the 2019 General Elections. A former MP, Michael Louis, who wishes to stand as an independent, is actively pursuing a judicial route to force an amendment. The Independent Electoral Commission (IEC) has stated that it is not opposed to an amendment but there is simply not enough time to implement it in time for the 2019 elections. After the Constitutional Court of South Africa declared the Electoral Act unconstitutional in 2020 because there was no way for independent candidates to be elected and in 2021, Home Affairs Minister Aaron Motsoaledi told Parliament that a new electoral system must be put in place, calls for MMP intensified and a Motsoaledi-appointed, Valli Moosa-led ministerial advisory committee was formed to determine the new system.

==== European Union (European Parliament) ====
Volt Europa, a progressive and federalist European political alliance, proposes transnational mixed-member proportional representation with the combination of Majority Judgment and party-list PR.

== Tactical manipulation ==
=== Split ticket voting ===
In other cases, a party may be so certain of winning a large number of constituency seats that it expects no extra seats in the proportional top-up (list seats). Some voters may therefore seek to achieve double representation by voting tactically for another party in the regional vote, as a vote for their preferred party in the regional vote would be wasted. This tactic is much less effective in MMP models with a relatively large share of list seats (50% in most German states, and 40% in the New Zealand House of Representatives) and/or ones which add "balancing seats", leading to fewer opportunities for overhangs and maintaining full proportionality, even when a party wins too many constituency seats.

==== Solutions ====
The problem of ticket splitting strategies can be solved either by eliminating at least one of the two mechanisms that create the opportunity for abuse:

1. Either the double vote can be abolished, returning to a mixed single vote (the original version of MMP used in Germany), in which case voters cannot split their ticket, even if it is a sincere preference.
2. Another solution is to eliminate the seat linkage mechanism and use a vote linkage one instead, in which case most likely more compensatory seats would be needed. A negative vote transfer based system (scorporo) retains the flaw that decoy lists can be used to abuse it, but if the two votes were tied in a mixed ballot transferable vote, the potential this kind of strategic manipulation would be eliminated. However, in this a case party proportionality is not likely and overall equality of votes would depend largely on the specifics of the system (the amount of compensation).

Compensatory mixed systems
	single vote systems (MSV)	dual vote systems
Seat linkage	mixed single vote, top-up versions: single vote MMP (Lesotho)	mixed-member proportional representation (MMP)
Seat linkage	mixed single vote, top-up versions: single vote MMP (Lesotho)	additional member system (AMS)
Seat linkage	mixed single vote, top-up versions: single vote MMP (Lesotho)	alternative vote plus (AV+)
Seat linkage	mixed single vote, top-up versions: single vote MMP (Lesotho)	Hybrids: e.g. parallel voting+AMS (South Korea)
Vote linkage	positive vote transfer (PVT/MSV): Hungarian (local elections)	Hybrids: Parallel voting+PVT (Hungary); negative vote transfer/scorporo (Italy, 1993–2005)
Vote linkage	Others systems:	
Vote linkage	dual-member mixed proportional (DMP)	mixed ballot transferable vote (MBTV)

=== Splitting parties ===
This sort of strategy for a coalition of parties to capture a larger share of list seats may be adopted formally as a strategy. By way of example, in Albania's 2005 parliamentary election, the two main parties did not expect to win any list seats, so they encouraged voters to use their list votes for allied minor parties. This tactic distorted the working of the model to the point that the parties that won list seats were almost always different from the parties that won constituency seats. Only one constituency member was elected from parties that won list seats. The election was condemned by the Organization for Security and Co-operation in Europe which said it failed to comply with international standards because of "serious irregularities", intimidation, vote-buying and "violence committed by extremists on both sides." Rather than increasing the number of list seats or "overhang" seats, Albania subsequently decided to change to a pure-list system.

In an abusive gambit similar to that used in Albania, major parties feeling that they are unlikely to win a large number of list seats because of their advantage at the constituency level might choose to split their party in two, with one subdivision of the party contesting the constituency seats, while the other contests the list seats—assuming this is allowed by electoral law. The two linked parties could then co-ordinate their campaign and work together within the legislature, while remaining legally separate entities. The result of this approach, if it is used by all parties, would be to transform MMP into a de facto parallel voting mechanism.

An example could be seen in the 2007 Lesotho general election. In this case the two leading parties, the Lesotho Congress for Democracy (LCD) and the All Basotho Convention (ABC) used decoy lists, respectively named the National Independent Party and the Lesotho Workers' Party to avoid the compensatory mechanisms of MMP. As a result, the LCD and its decoy were able to take 69.1% of the seats with only 51.8% of the vote. ABC leader Tom Thabane called the vote "free, but not fair." In the 2012 election, the voting system was adjusted to link the local and list seats to limit the decoy lists' effectiveness, resulting in an almost perfectly proportionate election result for the competing parties.

Another interesting case is that of Venezuela, which also ended up changing its system, in this case by formally adopting a parallel voting system and legitimizing party efforts to game the MMP approach. Venezuela introduced an MMP electoral system in 1993, but the tactic of creating a decoy party was introduced only in 2000, by the opposition governor of Yaracuy. The tactic was later adopted by pro-Chavez parties at the national level in 2005. After the decoy list tactic withstood a constitutional challenge, Venezuela eventually formally reverted to a parallel voting system, which yields a lesser degree of proportionality compared to MMP. On September 26, 2010, Chavez' party, the United Socialist Party of Venezuela, took 57.4% of parliamentary seats with only 48.2% of the vote under the new system (ignoring the role of small allied parties). One can see to what extent parallel voting had nonetheless helped to redress the balance toward proportionality somewhat by noting that Chavez' party would have taken an even larger share of assembly seats under a strict single-winner approach (71 constituency seats out of 109, or 65%).

Another example is that of the 2001 Italian general election, in which one of the two main coalitions (the House of Freedoms), which opposed the scorporo system (a system compensatory system similar to MMP), linked many of their constituency candidates to a decoy list (liste civetta) in the proportional parts, under the name Abolizione Scorporo. As a defensive move, the other coalition, Olive Tree, felt obliged to do the same, under the name Paese Nuovo. This meant that the constituency seats won by each coalition would not reduce the number of list seats available to them. In the case the House of Freedoms list faction Forza Italia, the tactic was so successful that it did not have enough candidates in the proportional part to receive as many seats as it in fact won, missing out on 12 seats. Italy subsequently changed its system.

Ahead of the 2020 South Korean legislative election, the electoral system was changed from parallel voting to a hybrid mixed-member proportional system, with 30 seats allocated in a compensatory manner. The opposition Liberty Korea Party subsequently set up a decoy list, the Future Korea Party, to win extra proportional seats. The ruling Democratic Party of Korea condemned them for exploiting the electoral law, but nonetheless set up its own decoy list, the Platform Party, in response. The decoy lists were successful on election day, with Future Korea winning 12 compensatory seats and Platform winning 11. After the election, both decoy lists merged into their mother parties. The tactic was used again in the 2024 legislative election.

=== Electoral thresholds ===
In systems with a threshold, people who prefer a larger party may tactically vote for a minor party that is predicted to poll close to or slightly below the threshold. Some voters may be afraid the minor party will poll below the threshold, and that that would weaken the larger political camp to which the minor party belongs. For example, the German moderate-right Free Democratic Party (FDP) has often received votes from voters who preferred the larger Christian Democratic Union (CDU) party, because they feared that if the FDP received less than 5% of the votes, the CDU would have no parliamentary allies and would be unable to form a government on its own. This tactical voting also ensures that fewer votes are wasted, but at the cost of giving the FDP more seats than CDU voters would ideally have preferred. This tactic is the same in any method of proportional representation with a threshold.

Similarly, in New Zealand, some voters who preferred a large party have voted for the minor party's local candidate to ensure it qualifies for list seats on the back of winning a single electorate. This notably occurred in the right-wing inner Auckland electorate of Epsom in 2008 and 2011, where the National Party voters gave their local vote to the ACT Party. In this case the tactic maintained some proportionality by bypassing the 5% threshold, but is largely disfavoured by the public due to it awarding smaller parties extra list seats while parties with a higher party vote percentage that do not win an electorate receive no seats; this occurred in 2008 when ACT was awarded 5 seats on the back of one electorate seat and 3.7% of the party vote, while New Zealand First with no electorate seats and 4.1% of the party vote were awarded none. In 2011, some Epsom voters voting for the left-wing Labour and Green parties tried to block the tactic by giving their local vote to the National candidate; while it was unsuccessful, it did reduce ACT's majority over National from 12,900 to 2,300. In August 2012, the initial report on a review of the MMP system by the Electoral Commission recommended abolishing the one electorate seat threshold, meaning a party winning an electorate seat but not crossing the 5% threshold (which the same report recommends lowering to 4%) is only awarded that electorate seat.

== See also ==
- Additional member system, a sometimes semi-proportional system aiming for MMP implemented in the United Kingdom
  - Alternative Vote Plus
- Leveling seat
- Mixed single vote
- Mixed ballot transferable vote
- Dual-member mixed proportional
- Biproportional apportionment
