= 2016 Prince Edward Island electoral reform referendum =

Canadian provincial referendum

Prince Edward Island Plebiscite on Democratic Renewal, 2016
- 27 October – 7 November 2016
- Voting system: Instant-runoff voting
- Website: yourchoicepei.ca

First round
Dual Member Proportional Representation	21.45%
First-Past-The-Post (the current system)	31.22%
First-Past-The-Post Plus Leaders	7.61%
Mixed Member Proportional Representation	29.04%
Preferential Voting	10.64%

Final Round
Dual Member Proportional Representation	0%
First-Past-The-Post (the current system)	42.84%
First-Past-The-Post Plus Leaders	0%
Mixed Member Proportional Representation	52.42%
Preferential Voting	0%

A non-binding referendum on electoral reform was held in the Canadian province of Prince Edward Island between 27 October – 7 November 2016. This was the second electoral reform referendum to be held in Prince Edward Island, following a vote to maintain the status quo in 2005. The referendum asked which of five voting systems residents would prefer to use in electing members to the Legislative Assembly of Prince Edward Island. The referendum used Instant-runoff voting. Four rounds were held. This brought the options down to just two, where mixed member proportional representation was the majority choice with 55.03% support of the total 35,287 active votes, while first past the post had 45 per cent of those votes. Exhausted votes had grown to 1753 by that point. MMP's vote tally at the end was equivalent to 52.42% of the votes cast in the first round.

The plebiscite suffered from low voter turnout. Despite the variety of voting options and a long polling period, the 36.46% turnout was low by PEI standards. The province regularly gets more than 80% turnout in provincial general elections.

Although he had set no threshold of minimum turnout for the plebiscite to be considered binding, Premier Wade MacLauchlan cited the low turnout as a factor in choosing not to proceed with immediate electoral reform.

A third referendum on the subject was held in 2019.

== Question ==
The official question on the ballot was:

"Rank the following electoral systems in your order of preference, 1 through 5 (with "1st Choice" being your most preferred and "5th choice" being your least preferred). You may choose as many, or as few, of the electoral system options as you want."

The options were listed alphabetically on the ballot as:

- Dual Member Proportional Representation
- First-Past-The-Post (the current system)
- First-Past-The-Post Plus Leaders (Note: Where most members are elected using FPTP as before, but party leaders do not run for seats and are instead assigned an at-large seat if their party receives more than 10% of the popular vote)
- Mixed Member Proportional Representation
- Preferential Voting (which in this case meant Instant-runoff voting).

== Process of the vote count ==
The result of the plebiscite was found by using the Preferential Voting system, itself one of the options for elections being considered. Voters were given the opportunity to rank the five options from most preferred to least preferred, although they did not have to rank all five options. If more than half of the voters chose one option as their first choice, that option won; if no option received a majority of first-choice votes, the winner was determined after vote transfers as per instant-runoff voting. The option with the fewest votes was dropped, and those ballots were distributed to the other options based on the second choice on those ballots. This was repeated as necessary until one option had a majority of the votes.

== Results ==
No option received a majority in the First count. Vote transfers were used as per IRV, to establish a majority winner. MMP took a majority of the votes in the 4th Count.

Prince Edward Island electoral reform referendum, 2016

18,521 votes required to win in the first count.

(thereafter, a majority of the votes still in play was needed to win.)

Prince Edward Island electoral reform referendum, 2016 (final results)
Choice	FPV%	Count			
Choice	FPV%	1	2	3	4
First Past The Post	31.23	11,567	13,108	14,466	15,869
Mixed Member Proportional Representation	29.04	10,757	11,153	12,780	19,418
Dual Member Proportional Representation	21.46	7,951	8,224	8,948	
Preferential Voting	10.65	3,944	4,216		
FPTP + Leaders	7.62	2,821			
Totals	100.00	37,040	36,701	36,194	35,287
Exhausted			339	507	907

Analysis of transferred votes, ranked in order of 1st preference votes
Choice	Maximum round	Maximum votes	Share in maximum round	Maximum votes First round votesTransfer votes
First Past The Post	4	15,869	44.97	
Mixed Member Proportional Representation	4	19,418	55.03	
Dual Member Proportional Representation	3	8,948	24.72	
Preferential Voting	2	4,216	11.49	
FPTP + Leaders	1	2,821	7.62	
Exhausted votes		1,753	4.73	

== Voting eligibility and methods ==
This plebiscite marked several firsts in Canadian electoral history. Sixteen- and seventeen-year-old PEI residents were permitted to vote on the grounds that they will be aged eighteen (and therefore eligible to vote under normal election rules) in the next provincial election, which would potentially be held using the voting system that wins this plebiscite. As well, plebiscite voters were able to submit their votes online or via touch-tone telephone for the first time in a major Canadian vote. Internet and telephone voting was open from 12:00 noon Saturday 29 October 2016 and ran until 7:00 p.m. on Monday, 7 November 2016. In-person voting was open in polling stations across the province on Friday, 4 November 2016, 4:00 p.m. - 9:00 p.m., and Saturday, 5 November 2016, 10:00 a.m. - 8:00 p.m.

== Aftermath ==
Premier Wade MacLauchlan said after the vote that he was doubtful the result of the referendum "can be said to constitute a clear expression of the will of Prince Edward Islanders" due to the unusually low turnout. MacLauchlan did commit to discussing the results when the provincial legislature resumed on 15 November 2016; noting the need to examine the urban and rural breakdown of votes, among other issues.

MacLauchlan's government introduced a motion in the Legislative Assembly of Prince Edward Island to hold a second referendum on electoral reform at the next provincial general election, stating that the low turnout for the referendum did not provide a mandate to implement the change and the need for a more specific referendum question with two choices. A motion by Green Party leader Peter Bevan-Baker to implement mixed-member proportional representation in line with the referendum results was defeated on 22 November 2016 by a vote of 6–20.

=== Subsequent referendum held in April 2019 ===
A subsequent electoral reform referendum was held on 23 April 2019, simultaneously with the 66th Prince Edward Island general election. Results of this referendum were very close with 51.7% voting No and 48.3% voting Yes. Neither side met the conditions for the results to be considered binding. and prior to the next election the Island is debating reforms of this nature.
