= 62nd General Assembly of Prince Edward Island =

2003–2007 Canadian legislative session

The 62nd General Assembly of Prince Edward Island was in session from November 12, 2003 to April 30, 2007. The Progressive Conservative Party led by Pat Binns formed the government.

Gregory Deighan was elected speaker.

There were four sessions of the 62nd General Assembly:

Session	Start	End
1st	November 12, 2003	May 24, 2004
2nd	April 6, 2005	June 7, 2005
3rd	November 16, 2005	June 28, 2006
4th	November 16, 2006	April 30, 2007

== Members ==
District	Member	Party	First elected / previously elected
Alberton-Miminegash	Cletus Dunn	Progressive Conservative	2000
Belfast-Pownal Bay	Wilbur MacDonald	Progressive Conservative	1982, (Note: 4th Queens (Assemblyman)) 1996
Borden-Kinkora	Fred McCardle	Progressive Conservative	2003
Cascumpec-Grand River	Philip Brown	Progressive Conservative	2000
Charlottetown-Kings Square	Richard Brown	Liberal	1997, 2003
Charlottetown-Rochford Square	Robert Ghiz	Liberal	2003
Charlottetown-Spring Park	Wes MacAleer	Progressive Conservative	1996
Evangeline-Miscouche	Wilfred Arsenault	Progressive Conservative	2000
Georgetown-Baldwin's Road	Michael Currie	Progressive Conservative	1996
Glen Stewart-Bellevue Cove	David McKenna	Progressive Conservative	2003
Kellys Cross-Cumberland	Carolyn Bertram	Liberal	2003
Kensington-Malpeque	Mitch Murphy	Progressive Conservative	1996
Montague-Kilmuir	Jim Bagnall	Progressive Conservative	1996
Morell-Fortune Bay	Kevin MacAdam (Note: resigned in 2006)	Progressive Conservative	1996
Morell-Fortune Bay	Olive Crane (2006)	Progressive Conservative	2006
Murray River-Gaspereaux	Pat Binns	Progressive Conservative	1978, (Note: 4th Kings (Assemblyman)) 1996
North River-Rice Point	Ron MacKinley	Liberal	1985
Park Corner-Oyster Bed	Beth MacKenzie	Progressive Conservative	1996
Parkdale-Belvedere	Chester Gillan	Progressive Conservative	1996
Sherwood-Hillsborough	Elmer MacFadyen	Progressive Conservative	1996
Souris-Elmira	Andy Mooney	Progressive Conservative	1996
St. Eleanors-Summerside	Helen MacDonald	Progressive Conservative	2000
Stanhope-East Royalty	Jamie Ballem	Progressive Conservative	1996
Tignish-Deblois	Gail Shea	Progressive Conservative	2000
Tracadie-Fort Augustus	Mildred Dover	Progressive Conservative	1996
West Point-Bloomfield	Eva Rodgerson	Progressive Conservative	2000
Wilmot-Summerside	Greg Deighan	Progressive Conservative	1996
Winsloe-West Royalty	Wayne Collins	Progressive Conservative	2003
