= 60th General Assembly of Prince Edward Island =

1997–2000 Canadian legislative session

- Majority parliament

Parliament leaders
- Premier: Pat Binns
- Leader of the Opposition: Paul Connolly

Party caucuses
- Government: Progressive Conservative Party
- Opposition: Liberal Party
- Recognized: New Democratic Party
- Members: 27 MLA seats

Sovereign
- Monarch: Elizabeth II; 6 February 1952 – present
- Lieutenant governor: Gilbert Clements; 30 August 1995 – 28 May 2001
← 59th	→ 61st

The 60th General Assembly of Prince Edward Island was in session from January 3, 1997, to March 21, 2000. The Progressive Conservative Party led by Pat Binns formed the government. In 1996, the 16 dual-member districts were changed to 27 single-member districts. Thus the Assemblymen and Councillors were renamed MLAs

Wilbur MacDonald was elected speaker.

There were three sessions of the 60th General Assembly:

Session	Start	End
1st	January 3, 1997	June 11, 1998
2nd	November 12, 1998	June 8, 1999
3rd	November 16, 1999	November 16, 1999

== Members ==
District	Member	Party	First elected / previously elected
Alberton-Miminegash	Hector MacLeod	Liberal	1993
Belfast-Pownal Bay	Wilbur MacDonald	Progressive Conservative	1982, (Note: 4th Queens (Assemblyman)) 1996
Borden-Kinkora	Eric Hammill	Progressive Conservative	1996
Cascumpec-Grand River	Keith Milligan	Liberal	1981
Charlottetown-Kings Square	Wayne Cheverie (Note: resigned to accept appointment)	Liberal	1986
Charlottetown-Kings Square	Richard Brown (1997)	Liberal	1997
Charlottetown-Rochford Square	Paul Connolly	Liberal	1982
Charlottetown-Spring Park	Wes MacAleer	Progressive Conservative	1996
Crapaud-Hazel Grove	Norman MacPhee	Progressive Conservative	1996
Evangeline-Miscouche	Robert Maddix	Liberal	1993
Georgetown-Baldwin's Road	Michael Currie	Progressive Conservative	1996
Glen Stewart-Bellevue Cove	Pat Mella	Progressive Conservative	1993
Kensington-Malpeque	Mitch Murphy	Progressive Conservative	1996
Montague-Kilmuir	Jim Bagnall	Progressive Conservative	1996
Morell-Fortune Bay	Kevin MacAdam	Progressive Conservative	1996
Murray River-Gaspereaux	Pat Binns	Progressive Conservative	1978, (Note: 4th Kings (Assemblyman)) 1996
North River-Rice Point	Ron MacKinley	Liberal	1985
Park Corner-Oyster Bed	Beth MacKenzie	Progressive Conservative	1996
Parkdale-Belvedere	Chester Gillan	Progressive Conservative	1996
Sherwood-Hillsborough	Elmer MacFadyen	Progressive Conservative	1996
Souris-Elmira	Andy Mooney	Progressive Conservative	1996
St. Eleanors-Summerside	Nancy Guptill (Note: resigned in 1999)	Liberal	1987
Stanhope-East Royalty	Jamie Ballem	Progressive Conservative	1996
Tignish-Deblois	Robert Morrissey	Liberal	1982
Tracadie-Fort Augustus	Mildred Dover	Progressive Conservative	1996
West Point-Bloomfield	Herb Dickieson	New Democrat	1996
Wilmot-Summerside	Greg Deighan	Progressive Conservative	1996
Winsloe-West Royalty	Don MacKinnon	Progressive Conservative	1996
