= 61st General Assembly of Prince Edward Island =

2000–2003 Canadian legislative session

The 61st General Assembly of Prince Edward Island was in session from May 11, 2000 to September 2, 2003. The Progressive Conservative Party led by Pat Binns formed the government.

Mildred Dover was elected speaker.

There were four sessions of the 61st General Assembly:

Session	Start	End
1st	May 11, 2000	June 14, 2000
2nd	November 23, 2000	May 18, 2001
3rd	November 15, 2001	May 10, 2002
4th	November 14, 2002	May 22, 2003

== Members ==
District	Member	Party	First elected / previously elected
Alberton-Miminegash	Cletus Dunn	Progressive Conservative	2000
Belfast-Pownal Bay	Wilbur MacDonald	Progressive Conservative	1982, (Note: 4th Queens (Assemblyman)) 1996
Borden-Kinkora	Eric Hammill	Progressive Conservative	1996
Cascumpec-Grand River	Philip Brown	Progressive Conservative	2000
Charlottetown-Kings Square	Bob MacMillan	Progressive Conservative	2000
Charlottetown-Rochford Square	Jeff Lantz	Progressive Conservative	2000
Charlottetown-Spring Park	Wes MacAleer	Progressive Conservative	1996
Crapaud-Hazel Grove	Norman MacPhee	Progressive Conservative	1996
Evangeline-Miscouche	Wilfred Arsenault	Progressive Conservative	2000
Georgetown-Baldwin's Road	Michael Currie	Progressive Conservative	1996
Glen Stewart-Bellevue Cove	Pat Mella	Progressive Conservative	1993
Kensington-Malpeque	Mitch Murphy	Progressive Conservative	1996
Montague-Kilmuir	Jim Bagnall	Progressive Conservative	1996
Morell-Fortune Bay	Kevin MacAdam (Note: resigned in 2000 to run unsuccessfully for federal seat; reelected in 2001 by-election)	Progressive Conservative	1996
Murray River-Gaspereaux	Pat Binns	Progressive Conservative	1978, (Note: 4th Kings (Assemblyman)) 1996
North River-Rice Point	Ron MacKinley	Liberal	1985
Park Corner-Oyster Bed	Beth MacKenzie	Progressive Conservative	1996
Parkdale-Belvedere	Chester Gillan	Progressive Conservative	1996
Sherwood-Hillsborough	Elmer MacFadyen	Progressive Conservative	1996
Souris-Elmira	Andy Mooney	Progressive Conservative	1996
St. Eleanors-Summerside	Helen MacDonald	Progressive Conservative	2000
Stanhope-East Royalty	Jamie Ballem	Progressive Conservative	1996
Tignish-Deblois	Gail Shea	Progressive Conservative	2000
Tracadie-Fort Augustus	Mildred Dover	Progressive Conservative	1996
West Point-Bloomfield	Eva Rodgerson	Progressive Conservative	2000
Wilmot-Summerside	Greg Deighan	Progressive Conservative	1996
Winsloe-West Royalty	Don MacKinnon	Progressive Conservative	1996
