= 2003 Prince Edward Island general election =

Canadian provincial election

← 2000	September 29, 2003	2007 →

All 27 seats in the Legislative Assembly of Prince Edward Island 14 seats needed for a majority
- Turnout: 83.27%
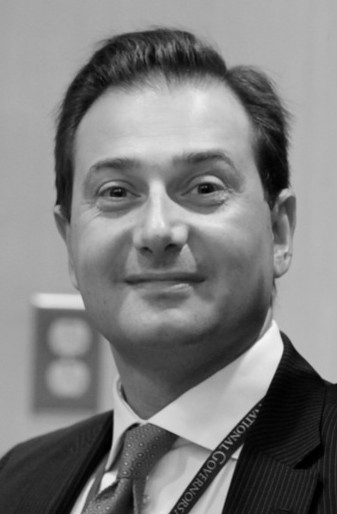
	First party	Second party
	PC
Leader	Pat Binns	Robert Ghiz
Party	Progressive Conservative	Liberal
Leader since	May 4, 1996	April 5, 2003
Leader's seat	Murray River-Gaspereaux	Ran in Charlottetown-Rochford Square (won)
Last election	26 seats, 58.00%	1 seat, 33.84%
Seats won	23	4
Seat change	▼3	▲3
Popular vote	43,712	34,347
Percentage	54.29%	42.66%
Swing	▼3.71pp	▲8.82pp
- Popular vote by riding. As this is an FPTP election, seat totals are not determined by popular vote, but instead via plurality results by each riding.
Premier before election
Pat Binns
Progressive Conservative
Premier after election
Pat Binns
Progressive Conservative

The 2003 Prince Edward Island general election was held on September 29, 2003 to elect the 27 members of the Legislative Assembly of Prince Edward Island. The election was called on September 2 by Premier Pat Binns, who enjoyed a high level of popularity among voters.

Polling took place on September 29, despite a blackout across two-thirds of the province and other damage caused by Hurricane Juan.

Binns' Progressive Conservatives were elected to a third consecutive majority government, the first time this had happened in Island history (for the PC party). The Premier, who ran in Murray River-Gaspereaux, was re-elected, along with his entire existing cabinet.

The Liberals wrested three seats from the Tories, increasing their standing to four seats. The party's new leader, Robert Ghiz, was one of those. The son of former premier Joe Ghiz beat Charlottetown mayor George MacDonald in the riding of Charlottetown-Rochford Square in Charlottetown.

The New Democrats did not win any seats; their leader, Gary Robichaud, was defeated by a Tory incumbent in Wilmot-Summerside.

== Results ==
↓
23	4
PC	Liberal

Party	Party Leader	# of candidates	Seats			Popular Vote	
Party	Party Leader	# of candidates	2000 election	Elected	% Change	#	%
Progressive Conservative	Pat Binns	27	26	23	-11.5%	43,712	54.29%
Liberal	Robert Ghiz	27	1	4	+300%	34,347	42.66%
New Democrats	Gary Robichaud	24	-	-	-	2,460	3.06%
Total		77	27	27	-	80,519	100%

Popular vote
PC	54.29%
Liberal	42.66%
New Democratic	3.06%

Seats summary
PC	85.19%
Liberal	14.81%

=== Largest and smallest margins of victory ===
The five largest margins of victory were:

1. Kensington-Malpeque: Mitch Murphy, PC, defeated Janice Sherry, Liberal, by 1416 votes.
2. North River-Rice Point: Ron MacKinley, Liberal, defeated Donna Butler, PC, by 1103 votes.
3. Murray River-Gaspereaux: Pat Binns, PC, defeated Michelle Johnston, Liberal, by 959 votes.
4. Glen Stewart-Bellevue Cove: David McKenna, PC, defeated Eric Ellsworth, Liberal, by 958 votes.
5. Alberton-Miminegash: Cletus Dunn, PC, defeated Robert B. White, Liberal, by 737 votes.

The five smallest margins of victory were:

1. Sherwood-Hillsborough: Elmer MacFadyen, PC, defeated Robert Mitchell, Liberal, by 61 votes.
2. Borden-Kinkora: Fred McCardle, PC, defeated Lorne Sutherland, Liberal, by 71 votes.
3. St. Eleanors-Summerside: Helen MacDonald, PC, defeated Gerard Greenan, Liberal, by 93 votes.
4. Evangeline-Miscouche: Wilfred Arsenault, PC, defeated Sonny Gallant, Liberal, by 104 votes.
5. Charlottetown-Kings Square: Richard Brown, Liberal, defeated Bob MacMillan, PC, by 142 votes.

=== Riding-by-riding results ===
==== Prince County ====
Electoral district	Candidates				Incumbent
Electoral district	PC	Liberal	NDP	Other	Incumbent
Alberton-Miminegash	Cletus Dunn; 1697	Robert B. White; 960	Donna Hardy; 53		Cletus J. Dunn
Borden-Kinkora	Fred McCardle; 1528	Lorne Sutherland; 1457	James Rodd; 80		Eric Hammill†
Cascumpec-Grand River	Philip Brown; 1477	Robert Noye; 981	Peter Robinson; 178		Philip Brown
Evangeline-Miscouche	Wilfred Arsenault; 1312	Sonny Gallant; 1208	Leona Arsenault; 69		Wilfred Arsenault
Kensington-Malpeque	Mitch Murphy; 2536	Janice Sherry; 1120	George S. Hunter; 92		Mitch Murphy
St. Eleanors-Summerside	Helen MacDonald; 1590	Gerard Greenan; 1497	Paulette Halupa; 97		Helen MacDonald
Tignish-Deblois	Gail Shea; 1480	Neil LeClair; 1177	Reg Pendergast; 20		Gail Shea
West Point-Bloomfield	Eva Rodgerson; 1193	Sean O'Halloran; 872	Ed Kilfoil; 232		Eva Rodgerson
Wilmot-Summerside	Greg Deighan; 1807	Duke Cormier; 1402	Gary Robichaud; 257		Greg Deighan

==== Queens County ====
Electoral district	Candidates				Incumbent
Electoral district	PC	Liberal	NDP	Other	Incumbent
Belfast-Pownal Bay	Wilbur MacDonald; 1331	Sarah Jane Bell; 1091	Michael Page; 110		Wilbur MacDonald
Crapaud-Hazel Grove	Norman MacPhee; 1683	Carolyn Bertram; 1829	Miranda Ellis; 99		Norman MacPhee
Glen Stewart-Bellevue Cove	David McKenna; 2249	Eric Ellsworth; 1291	Jane MacNeil; 243		Pat Mella
North River-Rice Point	Donna Butler; 1403	Ron MacKinley; 2506	Marlene Hunt; 108		Ron MacKinley
Park Corner-Oyster Bed	Beth MacKenzie; 1908	Jean Tingley; 1608	Ken Bingham; 184		Beth MacKenzie
Stanhope-East Royalty	Jamie Ballem; 1858	Robert Vessey; 1400	Gerard Gallant; 78		Jamie Ballem
Tracadie-Fort Augustus	Mildred Dover; 1628	Buck Watts; 1253	Robert Perry; 64		Mildred Dover
Winsloe-West Royalty	Wayne Collins; 1971	Gordon MacKay; 1816			Don MacKinnon†

==== Charlottetown ====
Electoral district	Candidates				Incumbent
Electoral district	PC	Liberal	NDP	Other	Incumbent
Charlottetown-Kings Square	Bob MacMillan; 1278	Richard Brown; 1420	Kevin Roach; 86		Bob MacMillan
Charlottetown-Rochford Square	George MacDonald; 1276	Robert Ghiz; 1433	J'Nan Brown; 120		Jeff Lantz †
Charlottetown-Spring Park	Wes MacAleer; 1649	Barry Ling; 1448	Teresa Peters; 99		Wes MacAleer
Parkdale-Belvedere	Chester Gillan; 1562	Charlie Cooke; 897	Nick Boragina; 78		Chester Gillan
Sherwood-Hillsborough	Elmer MacFadyen; 1408	Robert Mitchell; 1347	Ronald G. Kelly; 75		Elmer MacFadyen

==== Kings County ====
Electoral district	Candidates				Incumbent
Electoral district	PC	Liberal	NDP	Other	Incumbent
Georgetown-Baldwin's Road	Mike Currie; 1652	Danny Walker; 984	Jane Dunphy; 64		Mike Currie
Montague-Kilmuir	Jim Bagnall; 1431	John Van Dyke; 792	Lorne Cudmore; 30		Jim Bagnall
Morell-Fortune Bay	Kevin MacAdam; 1601	Larry McGuire; 1050			Kevin J. MacAdam
Murray River-Gaspereaux	Pat Binns; 1584	Michelle Johnston; 625	Edith Perry; 45		Pat Binns
Souris-Elmira	Andy Mooney; 1291	Philip MacDonald; 1047			Andy Mooney

== See also ==
- List of PEI political parties
