= 2000 Prince Edward Island general election =

Canadian provincial election

| ← 1996 | April 17, 2000 | 2003 → |

All 27 seats in the Legislative Assembly of Prince Edward Island 14 seats needed for a majority
- Turnout: 84.86%
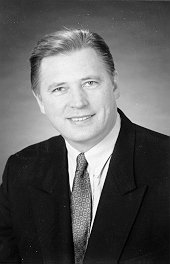
| | First party | Second party | Third party |
|---|---|---|---|
| | PC | Lib |
| Leader | Pat Binns | Wayne Carew | Herb Dickieson |
| Party | Progressive Conservative | Liberal | New Democratic |
| Leader since | May 4, 1996 | 1999 | March 1995 |
| Leader's seat | Murray River-Gaspereaux | Ran in St. Eleanors-Summerside (lost) | West Point-Bloomfield (lost re-election) |
| Last election | 18 seats, 47.39% | 8 seats, 44.76% | 1 seat, 7.85% |
| Seats won | 26 | 1 | 0 |
| Seat change | ▲8 | ▼7 | ▼1 |
| Popular vote | 45,820 | 26,739 | 6,446 |
| Percentage | 58.00% | 33.84% | 8.16% |
| Swing | ▲10.61pp | ▼10.92pp | ▲0.31pp |
- Popular vote by riding. As this is an FPTP election, seat totals are not determined by popular vote, but instead via plurality results by each riding.
Premier before election
Pat Binns
Progressive Conservative
Premier after election
Pat Binns
Progressive Conservative

The 2000 Prince Edward Island general election was held on April 17, 2000, to elect the 27 members of the Legislative Assembly of Prince Edward Island.

Premier Pat Binns' Progressive Conservative Party was elected to its second straight majority, winning every seat but one. This was an increase of eight seats from the previous election.

The Liberal Party, led by rookie leader Wayne Carew, only won one seat, and Carew lost his own by a substantial margin.

The New Democratic Party, led by Herb Dickieson, increased their popular vote from the previous election, but lost their only seat (Dickieson's own).

== Results ==
↓
| 26 | 1 |
| PC | Liberal |

| Party | Party Leader | # of candidates | Seats | | | Popular Vote | |
| Party | Party Leader | # of candidates | 1996 election | Elected | % Change | # | % |
|---|---|---|---|---|---|---|---|
| Progressive Conservative | Pat Binns | 27 | 18 | 26 | +44.44% | 45,820 | 58.00% |
| Liberal | Wayne Carew | 27 | 8 | 1 | -87.50% | 26,739 | 33.84% |
| New Democrats | Herb Dickieson | 27 | 1 | - | -100% | 6,446 | 8.16% |
| Total | | 81 | 27 | 27 | - | 79,005 | 100% |

Popular vote
| PC | 58.00% |
| Liberal | 33.84% |
| New Democratic | 8.16% |

Seats summary
| PC | 96.30% |
| Liberal | 3.70% |

=== Riding-by-riding results ===
| Electoral district | Candidates | | | Incumbent |
| Electoral district | PC | Liberal | NDP | Incumbent |
|---|---|---|---|---|
| Alberton-Miminegash | Cletus Dunn; 1628 | Hector MacLeod; 1016 | Donna M Lewis; 137 | Hector MacLeod |
| Belfast-Pownal Bay | Wilbur MacDonald; 1611 | Ernie Mutch; 937 | Mark Hansen; 143 | Wilbur MacDonald |
| Borden-Kinkora | Eric Hammill; 1900 | Lorne Sutherland; 1002 | Andy Dibling; 153 | Eric Hammill |
| Cascumpec-Grand River | Philip Brown; 1118 | Rob Henderson; 1094 | Peter Robinson; 416 | Keith Milligan |
| Charlottetown-Kings Square | Bob MacMillan; 1215 | Richard Brown; 1197 | Lesley Sprague; 291 | Richard Brown |
| Charlottetown-Rochford Square | Jeff Lantz; 1433 | Ian "Tex" MacDonald; 1115 | Ken Bingham; 294 | Paul Connolly |
| Charlottetown-Spring Park | Wes MacAleer; 1743 | Dianne Portter; 944 | Leo Broderick; 432 | Wes MacAleer |
| Crapaud-Hazel Grove | Norman MacPhee; 1931 | Cecil Godfrey; 1223 | Tony Reddin; 341 | Norman MacPhee |
| Evangeline-Miscouche | Wilfred Arsenault; 1209 | Robert Maddix; 1126 | Leona Arsenault-Belaire; 160 | Robert Maddix |
| Georgetown-Baldwin's Road | Michael Currie; 1807 | Danny Campbell; 827 | Bruno Peripoli; 99 | Michael Currie |
| Glen Stewart-Bellevue Cove | Pat Mella; 2399 | Viola Evans-Murley; 852 | Jane MacNeil; 249 | Pat Mella |
| Kensington-Malpeque | Mitch Murphy; 2954 | Greg Campbell; 690 | Clarence Fraser; 218 | Mitch Murphy |
| Montague-Kilmuir | Jim Bagnall; 1379 | Larry Stanly Creed; 865 | Glen MacDonald; 85 | Jim Bagnall |
| Morell-Fortune Bay | Kevin MacAdam; 1791 | Danny Larkin; 826 | Brian Curley; 47 | Kevin MacAdam |
| Murray River-Gaspereaux | Pat Binns; 1668 | Andy Clarey; 687 | Deborah Kelly Hawkes; 41 | Pat Binns |
| North River-Rice Point | Donna Lank; 1673 | Ron MacKinley; 1830 | Irene Dawson; 321 | Ron MacKinley |
| Park Corner-Oyster Bed | Beth MacKenzie; 2135 | Allan Ling; 1223 | James Rodd; 287 | Beth MacKenzie |
| Parkdale-Belvedere | Chester Gillan; 1719 | Jacob Mal; 642 | Edith Perry; 186 | Chester Gillan |
| Sherwood-Hillsborough | Elmer MacFadyen; 1815 | Allan Poulton; 866 | Victoria Hill; 200 | Elmer MacFadyen |
| Souris-Elmira | Andy Mooney; 1535 | Philip MacDonald; 726 | Betty Fay; 176 | Andy Mooney |
| Stanhope-East Royalty | Jamie Ballem; 1992 | Eddie Reardon; 1080 | Leo Cheverie; 195 | Jamie Ballem |
| St. Eleanors-Summerside | Helen MacDonald; 1626 | Wayne Carew; 1194 | David Chapman; 368 | Nancy Guptill |
| Tignish-Deblois | Gail Shea; 1472 | Neil LeClair; 1068 | Reg Pendergast; 92 | Bobby Morrissey |
| Tracadie-Fort Augustus | Mildred Dover; 1737 | Judy Hughes; 982 | Blair W. Kelly; 163 | Mildred Dover |
| West Point-Bloomfield | Eva Rodgerson; 753 | Charles R. Adams; 403 | Herb Dickieson; 694 | Herb Dickieson |
| Wilmot-Summerside | Greg Deighan; 1674 | Paul Hudson Schurman; 1246 | Gary Robichaud; 403 | Greg Deighan |
| Winsloe-West Royalty | Don MacKinnon; 2203 | Peter McCloskey; 1078 | Marlene Hunt; 235 | Don MacKinnon |

== See also ==
- 2003 Prince Edward Island general election
- List of Prince Edward Island general elections (post-Confederation)
- List of PEI political parties
