= Nancy Guptill =

Canadian politician (1941–2020)

25th Speaker of the Legislative Assembly of Prince Edward Island
- In office April 15, 1993 – November 27, 1996
- Preceded by: Edward Clark
- Succeeded by: Wilbur MacDonald

MLA for 5th Prince
- In office 1987 – November 27, 1996
- Preceded by: George McMahon
- Succeeded by: riding dissolved

MLA for St. Eleanors-Summerside
- In office November 27, 1996 – 2000
- Preceded by: first member
- Succeeded by: Helen MacDonald

Personal details
- Born: April 28, 1941 Halifax, Nova Scotia, Canada
- Died: August 24, 2020 (aged 79) Summerside, Prince Edward Island, Canada
- Party: Liberal
- Occupation: radiotherapy technician

Nancy Evelyn Guptill (April 28, 1941 – August 24, 2020) was a Canadian politician from Prince Edward Island (PEI). She served in its Legislative Assembly from 1987 to 2000. A member of the provincial Liberal Party, she represented the electoral districts of 5th Prince from 1987 to 1996 and St. Eleanors-Summerside from 1996 to 2000. She was noted for being part of PEI's Famous Five when she was elected speaker in 1993.

== Early life ==
Guptill was born in Halifax, Nova Scotia, on April 28, 1941. She was the daughter of Lloyd and Evelyn Garrison. Guptill was educated at the Halifax Vocational School and the Victoria General Hospital. She married L.R. Gregg Guptill in 1964. Together, they had three daughters. The family eventually relocated to Summerside on Prince Edward Island in 1975.

== Career ==
Guptill started her career in politics as a member of the town council for Summerside, Prince Edward Island for two terms. She later revealed that she had never intended to enter politics. She decided to run only after being advised that she had no chance of being elected, since she was not from PEI and a woman. She went on to be elected as Member of the Legislative Assembly (MLA) in 1987. She was appointed to the provincial cabinet two years later, serving as Minister of Tourism and Parks from 1989 to 1991 and as Minister of Labour and Minister responsible for the Status of Women from 1991 to 1993. Throughout her tenure as MLB, Guptill was noted for her resolve to create jobs for her constituents in Summerside.

Guptill was subsequently elected Speaker of the Legislative Assembly on April 15, 1993, and served in that office until 1996. She became part of the province's Famous Five, together with Marion Reid (Lieutenant Governor), Catherine Callbeck (Premier), Pat Mella (Leader of the Opposition), and Libbe Hubley (Deputy Speaker). It marked the first time that all five legislative positions in a Canadian province were held by women. Premier Callbeck remembered Guptill for her sense of fairness as a speaker. She worked in that capacity with local police and the Royal Canadian Mounted Police to improve the security of Province House, after a pipe bomb exploded in the legislature on April 20, 1995.

Throughout her tenure in the legislature, Guptill found the work-home-life balance to be testing. Her husband's support, coupled with the fact that their daughters were at an older age, made the situation less difficult. Consequently, she advocated for shorter working hours to give female MLAs the opportunity to raise a family at the same time.

== Later years ==
Guptill retired as an MLA before the provincial election in 2000. She was later named chair of the provincial Workers Compensation Board in 2008.

Guptill died on August 24, 2020, in Summerside. She was 79, with her daughter noting that she loved spending her time with family and close friends.
