= 2017 Progressive Conservative Party of Prince Edward Island leadership election =

Canadian provincial political party election

- Date: October 20, 2017
- Convention: Charlottetown
- Resigning leader: Rob Lantz
- Won by: James Aylward
- Ballots: 1
- Candidates: 2

A Progressive Conservative Party of Prince Edward Island leadership election was held on October 20, 2017 choosing MLA James Aylward as the new leader. Previous party leader Rob Lantz resigned on September 23, 2015 after serving only seven months. The interim party leader was MLA Jamie Fox, from Lantz's resignation to Aylward's election.

== Timeline ==
- April 10, 2017 – Alan Mulholland declares.
- June 3, 2017 – Brad Trivers declares.
- June 14, 2017 – James Aylward declares.
- June 16, 2017 – Alan Mulholland withdraws.
- September 12, 2017 – The first leadership forum happens in Summerside.
- September 19, 2017 – Second leadership forum happens in Bloomfield Legion.
- September 26, 2017 – Third leadership forum happens in Holland College campus in Charlottetown.
- October 4, 2017 – Final leadership forum happens in RODD Brudenell.
- October 7, 2017 – Voting begins.
- October 17, 2017 – Voting ends.
- October 20, 2017 – Results are announced.

== Candidates ==
- Brad Trivers, MLA for Rustico-Emerald (2015–present), declared 3 June 2017
- James Aylward, MLA for Stratford-Kinlock (2011–2019), declared 14 June 2017

== Withdrawn ==
- Alan Mulholland, declared 10 April 2017, withdrew 16 June 2017.

== Declined ==
- Darlene Compton, MLA for Belfast-Murray River (2015–present)
- Steven Myers, MLA for Georgetown-St. Peters (2011–2025), interim leader of the PEI PC Party (2013–2015)

== Results ==
Aylward was elected on the first and only ballot.

First ballot:

- James Aylward
- Brad Trivers

Aylward received more than 50% of the vote on the only ballot.

== See also ==
- 2015 Progressive Conservative Party of Prince Edward Island leadership election
