= Tina Mundy =

Canadian politician

Member of the Legislative Assembly of Prince Edward Island for Summerside-St. Eleanors
- In office 4 May 2015 – 26 March 2019
- Preceded by: Gerard Greenan
- Succeeded by: riding redistributed

Personal details
- Born: Martina Marie Mundy; 26 December 1964 (age 61) Gander, Newfoundland and Labrador
- Party: Liberal
- Occupation: Politician

Martina "Tina" Marie Mundy (born 26 December 1964 in Gander, Newfoundland and Labrador) is a Canadian politician who served in the Legislative Assembly of Prince Edward Island from 2015 to 2019.

== Career ==
Prior to her election to the legislature, Mundy worked as a development officer for Holland College's campus in Summerside, and served for four years as a city councillor for Summerside City Council.

=== Electoral service ===
She was first elected in the 2015 provincial election. On 20 May 2015, Mundy was appointed as Minister of Education, Early Learning and Culture. She resigned the following day, citing a financial matter. On 7 January 2016, she returned to cabinet and was appointed to the Executive Council of Prince Edward Island as Minister of Family and Human Services.

She represented the electoral district of Summerside-St. Eleanors as a member of the Liberal Party until she was defeated in the 2019 Prince Edward Island general election.
