= Colin LaVie =

Canadian politician

32nd Speaker of the Legislative Assembly of Prince Edward Island
- In office 13 June 2019 – 6 March 2023
- Preceded by: Buck Watts
- Succeeded by: Darlene Compton

Member of the Legislative Assembly of Prince Edward Island for Souris-Elmira
- In office October 18, 2011 – March 6, 2023
- Preceded by: Allan Campbell
- Succeeded by: Robin Croucher

Personal details
- Born: October 28, 1962 (age 63) Souris, Prince Edward Island
- Party: Progressive Conservative

Colin LaVie (born 28 October 1962) is a Canadian politician, who was elected to the Legislative Assembly of Prince Edward Island in the 2011 provincial election. He represents the district of Souris-Elmira as a member of the Prince Edward Island Progressive Conservative Party.

On 13 June 2019, he was elected Speaker of the Legislative Assembly of Prince Edward Island.

== Electoral record ==
2019 Prince Edward Island general election: Souris-Elmira
Party	Candidate	Votes	%	±%
Progressive Conservative	Colin LaVie	1,347	44.7	+0.3
Liberal	Tommy Kickham	861	28.6	-7.2
Green	Boyd Leard	804	26.7	
Total valid votes		3,012	100.0	

2015 Prince Edward Island general election: Souris-Elmira
Party	Candidate	Votes	%
Progressive Conservative	Colin LaVie	1,179	44.4%
Liberal	Tommy Kickham	951	35.8%
New Democratic	Susan Birt	528	19.9%

2011 Prince Edward Island general election
Party	Candidate	Votes	%	±%
Progressive Conservative	Colin LaVie	1,302	48.58	+5.68
Liberal	Allan Campbell	1,272	47.46	-2.88
Island	Jason MacGregor	106	3.96	
Total valid votes		2,680	100.0	
Progressive Conservative gain from Liberal		Swing		+4.28
