= Brad Trivers =

Canadian politician

The Honourable Bradley G. Trivers MLA
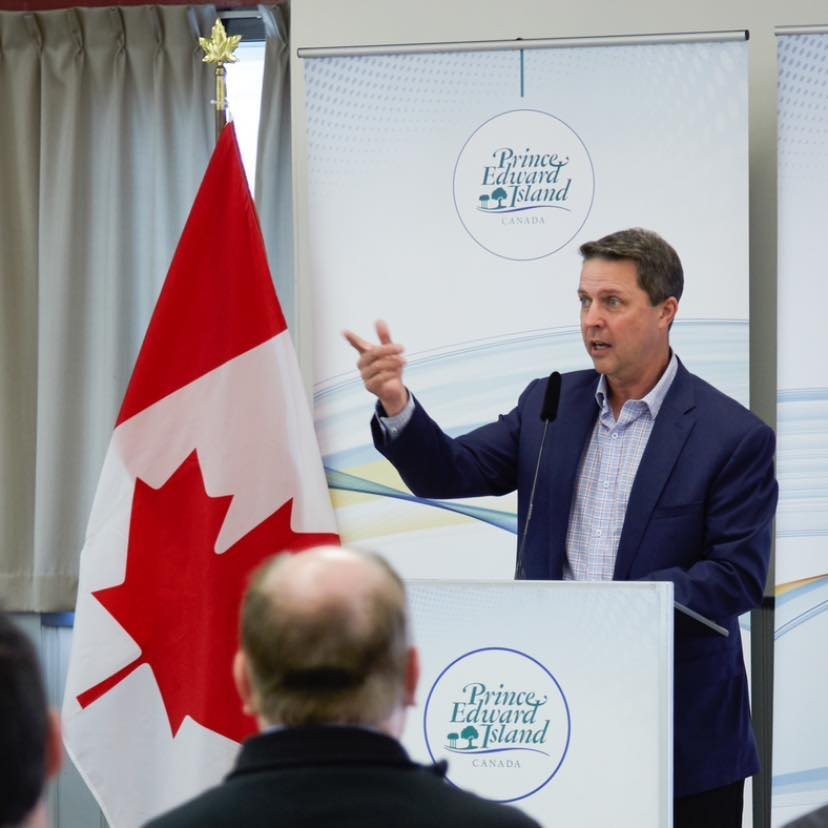

35th Speaker of the Prince Edward Island legislature
- Incumbent
- Assumed office March 25, 2026
- Preceded by: Sidney MacEwen

Deputy Speaker of the Prince Edward Island legislature
- In office March 25, 2025 – March 25, 2026
- Preceded by: Sidney MacEwen
- Succeeded by: Susie Dillon

Member of the Legislative Assembly of Prince Edward Island for Rustico-Emerald
- Incumbent
- Assumed office May 4, 2015
- Preceded by: Carolyn Bertram

Personal details
- Born: December 22, 1971 (age 54) Perth, Ontario
- Party: Progressive Conservative
- Education: University of Waterloo

Bradley (Brad) Grant Trivers (born 22 December 1971) is a Canadian politician, the 35th Speaker of the Prince Edward Island legislature. He was elected to the Legislative Assembly of Prince Edward Island in the 2015 provincial election. Trivers represents the electoral district of Rustico-Emerald as a member of the Progressive Conservative Party.

== Political career ==
He was previously the party's candidate in the same district for the 2011 election, losing to incumbent MLA Carolyn Bertram.

Prior to his election to the legislature, Trivers ran an information technology consulting business in New Glasgow. He is a graduate of the University of Waterloo.

Trivers was defeated for the leadership of the Progressive Conservative Party, in 2017 by James Aylward.

On May 9, 2019, Trivers was appointed to the Executive Council of Prince Edward Island as Minister of Education and Lifelong Learning and Minister of Environment, Water and Climate Change.

He was re-elected in the 2023 general election.

== Electoral record ==
2023 Prince Edward Island general election: Rustico-Emerald
Party	Candidate	Votes	%	±%
Progressive Conservative	Brad Trivers	1,990	62.5	+5.0
Green	Ranald MacFarlane	559	17.6	-9.4
Liberal	Flory Sanderson	532	16.7	+2.1
New Democratic	David Wilson	102	3.2	+2.3
Total valid votes		3,408	100.0	
Progressive Conservative hold		Swing		+7.2

2019 Prince Edward Island general election: Rustico-Emerald
Party	Candidate	Votes	%	±%
Progressive Conservative	Brad Trivers	1,918	57.5%	+10.27
Green	Colin Jeffrey	899	26.9%	+17.22
Liberal	Sandy MacKay	489	14.7%	-19.63
New Democratic	Sean Deagle	30	0.9%	-7.86
Total valid votes			100.0	
Progressive Conservative hold		Swing		

2015 Prince Edward Island general election
Party	Candidate	Votes	%	±%
Progressive Conservative	Brad Trivers	1,585	47.23	+2.91
Liberal	Bertha Campbell	1,152	34.33	-15.17
Green	Marianne Janowicz	325	9.68	+3.50
New Democratic	Leah-Jane Hayward	294	8.76	
Total valid votes		3,356	100.0	
Progressive Conservative gain from Liberal		Swing		+9.04
