= Peter Bevan-Baker =

Scottish-Canadian politician (born 1962)

The Honourable Peter Bevan-Baker MLA
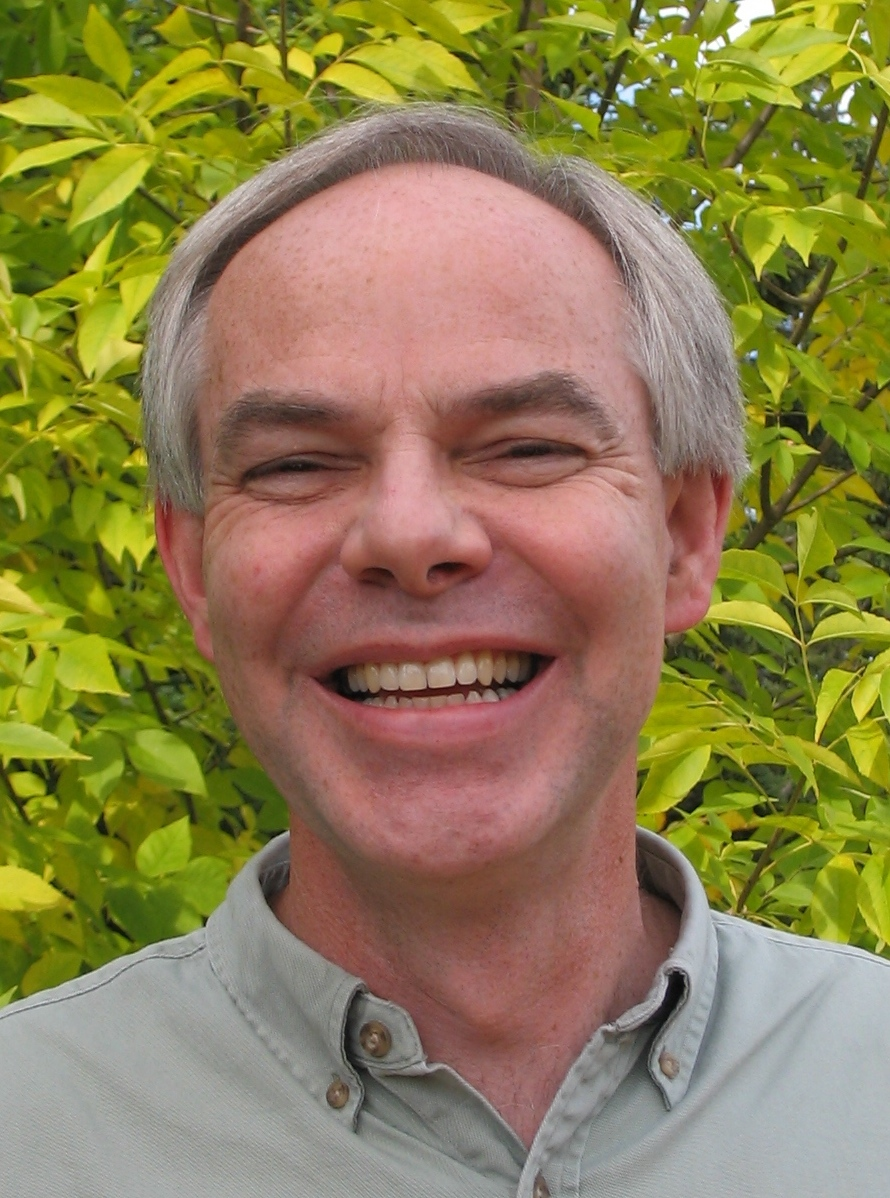

Leader of the Opposition in Prince Edward Island
- In office 9 May 2019 – 3 April 2023
- Preceded by: James Aylward
- Succeeded by: Hal Perry

Member of the Legislative Assembly of Prince Edward Island
- Incumbent
- Assumed office 23 April 2019
- Preceded by: Riding established
- Constituency: New Haven-Rocky Point
- In office 4 May 2015 – 26 March 2019
- Preceded by: Valerie Docherty
- Succeeded by: Riding dissolved
- Constituency: Kellys Cross-Cumberland

Leader of the Green Party of Prince Edward Island
- In office 3 November 2012 – 21 July 2023
- Deputy: Lynne Lund (2015–2023)
- Preceded by: Darcie Lanthier (interim)
- Succeeded by: Karla Bernard (interim)

Personal details
- Born: Peter Stewart Bevan-Baker; 3 June 1962 (age 64) Aberdeen, Scotland
- Party: Green
- Education: University of Glasgow
- Occupation: Dentist
- Website: peterbevanbaker.ca

Peter Stewart Bevan-Baker (born 3 June 1962) is a Scottish-Canadian politician. He served as the leader of the Green Party of Prince Edward Island from 2012 to 2023. He is currently the member of the Legislative Assembly of Prince Edward Island representing New Haven-Rocky Point (formerly representing Kellys Cross-Cumberland). He previously stood as a candidate for both the Green Party of Ontario and the Green Party of Canada. Bevan-Baker is a dentist by profession as well as being an active writer, musician and public speaker. Bevan-Baker served as the Leader of the Official Opposition in the 66th General Assembly of Prince Edward Island from 2019 to 2023.

== Personal life ==
He is the second child of composer John Bevan Baker and June Findlay. He holds a Bachelor of Dental Surgery degree from the University of Glasgow. In 1985 he emigrated to Canada, living first in Lewisporte, Newfoundland and then Brockville, Ontario before settling in Prince Edward Island in 2003. He became a Canadian citizen in 1992.

== Political career ==
Bevan-Baker joined the Green Party of Canada in 1992, and has run as a candidate for the House of Commons of Canada in the elections of 1993, 1997 in the riding of Leeds—Grenville and provincially in 1995 in the riding of Leeds-Grenville in Ontario, and 2008 and 2011 in Malpeque, PEI.

In 1997, he ran on a platform that advocated establishing a Genuine Progress Index (GPI). This was proposed to replace the Gross Domestic Product (GDP) as the standard measure for assessing national progress with an index that gauged the health and well-being of people, communities and eco-systems. Though not elected from 1997 to 2001, he forged an alliance with Liberal MP Joe Jordan to draft the Canada Well-Being Measurement Bill (C-268), which incorporated many of the central tenets of the GPI. The bill received first reading on 14 February 2001, but did not become law.

Bevan-Baker has also run three times as a candidate in provincial elections in Ontario, and on Prince Edward Island in the riding of Kelly's Cross-Cumberland in 2007 and 2011.

In 2012 he spearheaded a coalition from a broad spectrum of Islanders against a project known as "Plan B", which involved rerouting a portion of the Trans Canada Highway through a section of ancient Acadian forest, citing negative environmental and fiscal implications for the province. In 2015, Bevan-Baker was elected to the Prince Edward Island Legislative Assembly with 54% of the vote, winning the first-ever seat for the Green Party of Prince Edward Island. It was his tenth attempt at winning a seat. He is the third member of a provincial Green Party to win a seat in a provincial legislature in Canada, following Andrew Weaver in British Columbia and David Coon in New Brunswick.

In 2019 the Green Party under Bevan-Baker's leadership witnessed the best electoral performance of any Green Party in Canada, finishing with enough seats to form the Official Opposition, marking the first time that the Green Party has formed the Official Opposition at any level in Canadian history.

Following the 2023 election Bevan-Baker announced his intention to resign as leader. He was succeeded by fellow MLA Karla Bernard on an interim basis. As of September 8, 2024, he serves as the House Leader of the Third Party in the Legislature.

== Electoral history ==
2023 Prince Edward Island general election: New Haven-Rocky Point
| Party | Candidate | Votes | % | ±% |
|---|---|---|---|---|
| Green | Peter Bevan-Baker | 1,457 | 42.8 | -11.0 |
| Progressive Conservative | Donalda Docherty | 1,351 | 39.6 | +8.9 |
| Liberal | Sharon Cameron | 502 | 14.7 | -0.1 |
| New Democratic | Douglas Dahn | 49 | 1.4 | |
| Island | Neil Emery | 49 | 1.4 | |
| Total valid votes | | 3,408 | 100.0 | |
| Green hold | | Swing | | -10.0 |

2019 Prince Edward Island general election: New Haven-Rocky Point
| Party | Candidate | Votes | % | ±% |
|---|---|---|---|---|
| Green | Peter Bevan-Baker | 1,869 | 53.7% | – |
| Progressive Conservative | Kris Currie | 1,068 | 30.7% | – |
| Liberal | Judy MacNevin | 515 | 14.8% | – |
| Independent | Don Wills | 26 | 0.7% | – |
| Green pickup new district. | | | | |

2015 Prince Edward Island general election: Kellys Cross-Cumberland
| Party | Candidate | Votes | % | ±% |
|---|---|---|---|---|
| Green | Peter Bevan-Baker | 2,077 | 54.80 | +45.44 |
| Liberal | Valerie Docherty | 1,046 | 27.60 | -26.48 |
| Progressive Conservative | Randy Robar | 609 | 16.07 | -13.33 |
| New Democratic | Jesse Cousins | 58 | 1.53 | -4.04 |
| Total valid votes | | 3,790 | 100.0 | |
| Green gain from Liberal | | Swing | | +35.96 |

2011 Canadian federal election: Malpeque
| Party | Candidate | Votes | % | ±% | Expenditures |
|---|---|---|---|---|---|
| Liberal | Wayne Easter | 8,605 | 42.40 | -1.79 | $47,363.15 |
| Conservative | Tim Ogilvie | 7,934 | 39.10 | -0.18 | $62.426.68 |
| New Democratic | Rita Jackson | 2,970 | 14.63 | +4.96 | $5,426.11 |
| Green | Peter Bevan-Baker | 785 | 3.87 | -2.99 | $1,367.33 |
| Total valid votes/expense limit | | 20,294 | 100.0 | | $69,634.73 |
| Total rejected, unmarked and declined ballots | | 90 | 0.44 | -0.16 | |
| Turnout | | 20,384 | 77.47 | +6.06 | |
| Eligible voters | | 26,311 | | | |
| Liberal hold | | Swing | | -0.80 | |

2011 Prince Edward Island general election: Kellys Cross-Cumberland
| Party | Candidate | Votes | % | ±% |
|---|---|---|---|---|
| Liberal | Valerie Docherty | 1,768 | 54.08 | +1.57 |
| Progressive Conservative | Neila Auld | 961 | 29.40 | -6.73 |
| Green | Peter Bevan-Baker | 306 | 9.36 | +2.95 |
| New Democratic | Jesse Reddin Cousins | 182 | 5.57 | +0.61 |
| Island | Paul Smitz | 37 | 1.13 | |
| Independent | Arthur C. Mackenzie, Sr. | 15 | 0.52 | |
| Total valid votes | | 3,269 | 100.0 | |
| Liberal hold | | Swing | | +4.15 |

2008 Canadian federal election: Malpeque
| Party | Candidate | Votes | % | ±% | Expenditures |
|---|---|---|---|---|---|
| Liberal | Wayne Easter | 8,312 | 44.19 | -6.29 | $51,835.54 |
| Conservative | Mary Crane | 7,388 | 39.28 | +4.65 | $56,705.00 |
| New Democratic | J'Nan Brown | 1,819 | 9.67 | -0.57 | $5,225.01 |
| Green | Peter Bevan-Baker | 1,291 | 6.86 | +2.21 | $3,626.22 |
| Total valid votes/expense limit | | 18,810 | 100.0 | | $67,177 |
| Total rejected, unmarked and declined ballots | | 113 | 0.60 | +0.01 | |
| Turnout | | 18,923 | 71.41 | -3.69 | |
| Eligible voters | | 26,498 | | | |
| Liberal hold | | Swing | | -5.47 | |

2007 Prince Edward Island general election: Kellys Cross-Cumberland
| Party | Candidate | Votes | % | ±% |
|---|---|---|---|---|
| Liberal | Valerie Docherty | 1,811 | 52.51 | +1.86 |
| Progressive Conservative | Steven Stead | 1,246 | 36.13 | -10.48 |
| Green | Peter Bevan-Baker | 221 | 6.41 | |
| New Democratic | Lorraine Begley | 171 | 4.96 | +2.22 |
| Total valid votes | | 3,449 | 100.0 | |
| Liberal hold | | Swing | | 6.17 |

1997 Canadian federal election: Leeds—Grenville
| Party | Candidate | Votes | % | ±% | Expenditures |
|---|---|---|---|---|---|
| Liberal | Joe Jordan | 19,123 | 39.47 | -13.10 | $48,446 |
| Progressive Conservative | Sandra Lawn | 15,636 | 32.27 | +5.34 | $58,733 |
| Reform | Doug Aldridge | 10,476 | 21.62 | +5.65 | $18,190 |
| New Democratic | Jennifer Breakspear | 1,757 | 3.63 | +1.60 | $3,522 |
| Green | Peter Bevan-Baker | 1,102 | 2.27 | +1.21 | $1,427 |
| Christian Heritage | Donny F. Platt | 241 | 0.50 | * | $544 |
| Natural Law | Wayne Foster | 119 | 0.25 | -0.14 | $0 |
| Total valid votes | | 48,454 | 100.00 | | |
| Liberal hold | | Swing | | -9.22 | |

1995 Ontario general election: Leeds—Grenville
| Party | Candidate | Votes | % | ±% | Expenditures |
|---|---|---|---|---|---|
| Progressive Conservative | Bob Runciman | 21,763 | 63.27 | +14.20 | $44,550.77 |
| Liberal | Peter McKenna | 8,955 | 26.03 | –0.68 | $45,063.22 |
| New Democratic | Charles Stewart | 2,316 | 6.73 | –17.48 | $3,608.98 |
| Green | Peter Bevan-Baker | 927 | 2.69 | – | $1,692.83 |
| Independent | Phillip Blancher | 438 | 1.27 | – | $669.80 |
| Total valid votes/expense limit | | 34,399 | 99.26 | – | $47,488.00 |
| Total rejected, unmarked and declined ballots | | 255 | 0.74 | +0.03 | |
| Turnout | | 34,654 | 63.06 | –3.12 | |
| Eligible voters | | 54,953 | | | |
| Progressive Conservative hold | | Swing | | +7.44 | |
Source: Elections Ontario

1993 Canadian federal election: Leeds—Grenville
| Party | Candidate | Votes | % | ±% | Expenditures |
|---|---|---|---|---|---|
| Liberal | Jim Jordan | 26,567 | 52.57 | +9.17 | $49,114 |
| Progressive Conservative | Sandra Lawn | 13,608 | 26.93 | -11.97 | $53,521 |
| Reform | Paul West | 8,071 | 15.97 | * | $8,164 |
| New Democratic | Mary Ann Greenwood | 1,026 | 2.03 | -9.05 | $6,686 |
| Green | Peter Bevan-Baker | 538 | 1.06 | * | $0 |
| National | Holly Baker | 474 | 0.94 | * | $490 |
| Natural Law | Richard Beecroft | 196 | 0.39 | * | $0 |
| Abolitionist | Christine Richardson | 59 | 0.12 | * | $200 |
| Total valid votes | | 50,539 | 100.00 | | |
| Liberal hold | | Swing | | +10.57 | |
