= Wes Sheridan =

Canadian politician

Wesley J. Sheridan

Member of the Legislative Assembly of Prince Edward Island for Kensington-Malpeque
- In office June 12, 2007 – February 23, 2015
- Preceded by: Mitch Murphy
- Succeeded by: Matthew MacKay

Personal details
- Born: January 20, 1960 (age 66) Shediac, New Brunswick, Canada
- Party: Liberal

Wesley J. Sheridan (born 20 January 1960) is a Canadian politician. He represented the electoral district of Kensington-Malpeque in the Legislative Assembly of Prince Edward Island from 2007 to 2015. He was a member of the Liberal Party.

A native of Shediac, New Brunswick and a graduate of Dartmouth College, Sheridan was an assistant manager at the Malpeque Bay Credit Union prior to entering politics.

Sheridan was elected to the Legislative Assembly of Prince Edward Island in the 2007 provincial election, defeating Progressive Conservative cabinet minister Mitch Murphy in the Kensington-Malpeque riding. On June 12, 2007, Sheridan was appointed to the Executive Council of Prince Edward Island as Provincial Treasurer. In January 2010, he was given the additional responsibility of municipal affairs, with the cabinet position being styled as the Minister of Finance and Municipal Affairs. Sheridan was re-elected in 2011, and retained his position in cabinet.

On January 23, 2015, Sheridan announced that he would not reoffer in the 2015 election. Sheridan was dropped from cabinet when Wade MacLauchlan took over as premier on February 23, 2015, and he resigned as MLA the same day.
