= Allan Campbell (Canadian politician) =

Canadian politician

Member of the Legislative Assembly of Prince Edward Island for Souris-Elmira
- In office June 12, 2007 – October 18, 2011
- Preceded by: Andy Mooney
- Succeeded by: Colin LaVie

Personal details
- Born: May 21, 1969 (age 57) Souris, Prince Edward Island
- Party: Liberal
- Occupation: fisherman

Allan V. Campbell (born 21 May 1969) is a Canadian politician, who was elected to the Legislative Assembly of Prince Edward Island in the 2007 provincial election. He represented the electoral district of Souris-Elmira as a member of the Liberal Party.

He served in the Executive Council of Prince Edward Island as Minister of Fisheries and Aquaculture, and Minister of Innovation and Advanced Learning.

He was defeated in the 2011 provincial election by Colin LaVie and upon his defeat was appointed as Chief of Staff to the Premier of Prince Edward Island.

After completing his Bachelor of Business Administration at the University of Prince Edward Island, he purchased a fishing operation. He had a 15-year career in the fishery, and retired when he was appointed as Minister of Fisheries and Aquaculture.
