= Allen Roach =

Canadian politician

Member of the Legislative Assembly of Prince Edward Island for Montague-Kilmuir
- In office October 18, 2011 – March 26, 2019
- Preceded by: Jim Bagnall
- Succeeded by: Cory Deagle

Personal details
- Born: March 9, 1952 (age 74) Souris, Prince Edward Island
- Party: Liberal
- Occupation: Retired Member of the Royal Canadian Mounted Police (37 years)

Allen F. Roach (born 9 March 1952) is a Canadian politician, who was elected to the Legislative Assembly of Prince Edward Island in the 2011 provincial election. He represented the district of Montague-Kilmuir as a member of the Prince Edward Island Liberal Party until his resignation after deciding not to run in the 2019 Prince Edward Island general election.

In October 2011, Roach was appointed to the Executive Council of Prince Edward Island as Minister of Innovation and Advanced Learning. He retained the portfolio when Wade MacLauchlan took over as premier in February 2015, but was given an additional role as Minister of Fisheries, Aquaculture and Rural Development. On May 20, 2015, Roach was moved to Minister of Finance. Roach resigned his cabinet position as finance minister on January 10, 2018, after announcing that he would not run in the 2019 election.
