= Valerie Docherty =

Canadian politician

Valerie E. Docherty

Member of the Legislative Assembly of Prince Edward Island for Kellys Cross-Cumberland
- In office June 12, 2007 – May 4, 2015
- Preceded by: Carolyn Bertram
- Succeeded by: Peter Bevan-Baker

Personal details
- Born: June 25, 1963 (age 63)
- Party: Liberal
- Education: University of Prince Edward Island
- Occupation: civil servant, teacher

Valerie E. Docherty (born 25 June 1963) is a Canadian politician.

She was elected to the Legislative Assembly of Prince Edward Island in the 2007 provincial election. She represented the electoral district of Kellys Cross-Cumberland as a member of the Liberal Party for two terms. She is a graduate of the University of Prince Edward Island.

On January 13, 2010, Docherty was replaced in the Provincial Cabinet as minister of Tourism and Culture by Robert Vessey, MLA for York-Oyster Bed. Docherty was reappointed to cabinet in October 2011 as Minister of Community Services, Seniors, Labour and Minister responsible for the Status of Women. She was defeated by Green Party leader Peter Bevan-Baker in the 2015 provincial election.
