= Matthew MacKay =

Canadian politician

The Honourable Matthew MacKay MLA

Member of the Legislative Assembly of Prince Edward Island for Kensington-Malpeque
- Incumbent
- Assumed office May 4, 2015
- Preceded by: Wes Sheridan

Personal details
- Born: August 5, 1981 (age 44) Summerside
- Party: Progressive Conservative
- Occupation: Real estate agent

Matthew MacKay (born 5 August 1981 in Summerside) is a Canadian politician, who was elected to the Legislative Assembly of Prince Edward Island in the 2015 provincial election. He represents the electoral district of Kensington-Malpeque as a member of the Progressive Conservative Party.

On May 9, 2019, MacKay was appointed to the Executive Council of Prince Edward Island as Minister of Economic Growth, Tourism and Culture, and Minister responsible for Greater Summerside.

He was re-elected in the 2023 general election. MacKay was left out of cabinet when the new government was sworn-in on April 14, 2023.

Prior to his election to the legislature, MacKay was also a real estate agent in Summerside for Century 21.

== Electoral record ==
2023 Prince Edward Island general election: Kensington-Malpeque
| Party | Candidate | Votes | % | ±% |
|---|---|---|---|---|
| Progressive Conservative | Matthew MacKay | 2,294 | 76.6 | 14.5 |
| Green | Hunter Guindon | 463 | 15.5 | -9.4 |
| Liberal | Richard Schroeter | 169 | 5.6 | -6.4 |
| New Democratic | Maggie Larocque | 67 | 2.2 | 1.3 |
| Total valid votes | | 2,993 | 100.0 | |
| Progressive Conservative hold | | Swing | | +12.0 |

2019 Prince Edward Island general election: Kensington-Malpeque
| Party | Candidate | Votes | % | ±% |
|---|---|---|---|---|
| Progressive Conservative | Matthew MacKay | 2,008 | 62.1 | +7.8 |
| Green | Matthew J. Mackay | 805 | 24.9 | +14.7 |
| Liberal | Nancy Beth Guptill | 389 | 12.0 | -16.3 |
| New Democratic | Carole MacFarlane | 31 | 1.0 | -6.2 |
| Total valid votes | | 3,233 | | |
| Progressive Conservative hold | | Swing | | |

2015 Prince Edward Island general election
| Party | Candidate | Votes | % | ±% |
|---|---|---|---|---|
| Progressive Conservative | Matthew MacKay | 1,984 | 54.28 | +17.68 |
| Liberal | Paul Montgomery | 1,033 | 28.26 | -28.92 |
| Green | Lynne Lund | 374 | 10.23 | |
| New Democratic | Joe Larkin | 264 | 7.22 | +1.00 |
| Total valid votes | | 3,655 | 100.0 | |
| Progressive Conservative gain from Liberal | | Swing | | +23.30 |
