= Gerard Greenan =

Canadian politician (born 1950)

L. Gerard Greenan

Member of the Legislative Assembly of Prince Edward Island for Summerside-St. Eleanors
- In office June 12, 2007 – May 4, 2015
- Preceded by: Helen MacDonald
- Succeeded by: Tina Mundy

Personal details
- Born: 17 February 1950 (age 76) Charlottetown, Prince Edward Island
- Party: Liberal

L. Gerard Greenan (born 17 February 1950) is a Canadian politician. He was elected to the Legislative Assembly of Prince Edward Island in the 2007 provincial election. He represents the electoral district of Summerside-St. Eleanors and is a member of the Liberal Party. On June 12, 2007, he was appointed to the Executive Council of Prince Edward Island as Attorney General and Minister of Education. In an April 2008 cabinet shuffle, he was styled Minister of Education and Early Childhood Development. Greenan was dropped from cabinet in January 2010.

On January 23, 2015, Greenan announced he would not seek re-election in the 2015 election.

== Election results ==
2007 Prince Edward Island general election: Summerside-St. Eleanors
Party	Candidate	Votes	%	±%
Liberal	Gerard Greenan	1,697	54.36	+9.06
Progressive Conservative	Brent Gallant	1,228	39.33	−12.23
Green	Stuart Smith	86	2.75	
New Democratic	Paulette Halupa	77	2.47	−0.68
Independent	John W. A. Curtis	34	1.09	
Total valid votes		3,122	100.0	
Liberal gain from Progressive Conservative		Swing		+10.64

2011 Prince Edward Island general election: Summerside-St. Eleanors
Party	Candidate	Votes	%	±%
Liberal	Gerard Greenan	1,426	51.76	−2.60
Progressive Conservative	Merlin Cormier	1,037	37.64	−1.69
New Democratic	Paulette Halupa	147	5.34	+2.87
Green	Caleb Adams	145	5.26	+2.51
Total valid votes		2,755	100.0	
Liberal hold		Swing		−0.46
