= Norman MacPhee =

Canadian politician

MLA for Crapaud-Hazel Grove
- In office 1996–2003
- Preceded by: riding established
- Succeeded by: Carolyn Bertram

Personal details
- Born: July 9, 1943 (age 82) Long Creek, Prince Edward Island
- Party: Progressive Conservative

Norman MacPhee (born July 9, 1943) is a Canadian politician and businessman. He represented Crapaud-Hazel Grove in the Legislative Assembly of Prince Edward Island from 1996 to 2003 as a Progressive Conservative.

MacPhee was born in 1943 in Long Creek, Prince Edward Island. He married Elaine Carver. MacPhee received his third-class Stationary Engineer at the Provincial Vocational Institute, and has operated his own plumbing and heating business since 1975.

MacPhee entered provincial politics in the 1996 election, defeating Liberal candidate Eric MacArthur by 137 votes in the new Crapaud-Hazel Grove riding. He was re-elected in the 2000 election. MacPhee was defeated when he ran for re-election in 2003, losing to Liberal Carolyn Bertram by 146 votes.
