= Carolyn Bertram =

Canadian politician

30th Speaker of the Legislative Assembly of Prince Edward Island
- In office November 1, 2011 – June 2, 2015
- Preceded by: Kathleen Casey
- Succeeded by: Buck Watts

Member of the Legislative Assembly of Prince Edward Island for Rustico-Emerald
- In office June 12, 2007 – May 4, 2015
- Preceded by: Beth MacKenzie
- Succeeded by: Brad Trivers

Member of the Legislative Assembly of Prince Edward Island for Crapaud-Hazel Grove
- In office September 29, 2003 – June 12, 2007
- Preceded by: Norman MacPhee
- Succeeded by: Valerie Docherty

Personal details
- Born: April 21, 1974 (age 51)
- Party: Liberal
- Occupation: teacher

Carolyn Bertram (born 21 April 1976) is a Canadian politician. She represented the electoral districts of Crapaud-Hazel Grove and Rustico-Emerald in the Legislative Assembly of Prince Edward Island from 2003 to 2015. She was a member of the Liberal Party.

== Education and early career ==
Bertram received a Bachelor of Arts from the University of Prince Edward Island and a Bachelor of Education from Mount Saint Vincent University, and was a teacher by career.

== Political career ==
She was elected to the Legislative Assembly of Prince Edward Island in the 2003 provincial election for the electoral district of Crapaud-Hazel Grove. In the 2007 election, she stood in the district of Rustico-Emerald, and was re-elected.

On June 12, 2007, Bertram was appointed to the Executive Council of Prince Edward Island as Minister of Communities, Cultural Affairs and Labour. In January 2010, Bertram was moved to Minister of Health and Wellness. Following her re-election in the 2011 election, Bertram was dropped from cabinet. On November 1, 2011, she was elected Speaker of the Legislative Assembly of Prince Edward Island.

Bertram did not seek re-election in 2015.

=== Electoral record ===
2011 Prince Edward Island general election: Rustico-Emerald
Party	Candidate	Votes	%	±%
Liberal	Carolyn Bertram	1,498	49.50	-10.78
Progressive Conservative	Brad Trivers	1,341	44.32	+10.63
Green	Ron Wagner	187	6.18	+0.15
Total valid votes		3,026	100.0	
Liberal hold		Swing		-10.70

2007 Prince Edward Island general election: Rustico-Emerald
Party	Candidate	Votes	%	±%
Liberal	Carolyn Bertram	1,970	60.28	+16.82
Progressive Conservative	David Blacquiere	1,101	33.69	-17.88
Green	Sharon Labchuk	197	6.03	
Total valid votes		3,268	100.0	
Liberal gain from Progressive Conservative		Swing		+17.35

2003 Prince Edward Island general election: Crapaud-Hazel Grove
Party	Candidate	Votes	%	±%
Liberal	Carolyn Bertram	1,829	50.65	+15.66
Progressive Conservative	Norman MacPhee	1,683	46.61	-8.64
New Democratic	Miranda Ellis	99	2.74	-7.02
Total valid votes		3,611	100.0	
Liberal gain from Progressive Conservative		Swing		+12.15
