= Wayne Collins (politician) =

Canadian radio journalist and politician

MLA for Winsloe-West Royalty
- In office 2003 – June 12, 2007
- Preceded by: Don MacKinnon
- Succeeded by: Bush Dumville

Personal details
- Born: January 15, 1949 (age 77)
- Party: Progressive Conservative

Wayne Alphonsus Collins (born 15 January 1949) is a Canadian former radio journalist and politician. Originally from Newfoundland and Labrador, he worked primarily in Prince Edward Island.

== Journalism ==
Collins worked for the Canadian Broadcasting Corporation, hosting Island Morning on CBCT-FM in Charlottetown from 1983 until April 2003.

== Political office ==
Following his retirement, Collins joined the Prince Edward Island Progressive Conservative Party and was nominated as the party's candidate for the electoral district of Winsloe-West Royalty in the summer of 2003. He was elected as a member of the Legislative Assembly of Prince Edward Island in the 2003 general election held on September 29 and served until his defeat in 2007.
