= Tracadie-Fort Augustus =

Former provincial electoral district in Prince Edward Island, Canada

Prince Edward Island electoral district

Defunct provincial electoral district
- Legislature: Legislative Assembly of Prince Edward Island
- First contested: 1996
- Last contested: 2003

Tracadie-Fort Augustus is a former provincial electoral district for the Legislative Assembly of Prince Edward Island, Canada.

The district was created prior to the 1993 Prince Edward Island general election out of part of 3rd Queens and a small part of 2nd Kings.

The district was dissolved in the redistribution that preceded the 2007 Prince Edward Island general election into Tracadie-Hillsborough Park, Morell-Mermaid, and Vernon River-Stratford.

== Members ==
The riding has elected the following members of the Legislative Assembly:

Members of the Legislative Assembly for Tracadie-Fort Augustus
Assembly	Years	Member	Party
See 3rd Queens and 2nd Kings 1873–1996
60th	1996–2000	Mildred Dover	Progressive Conservative
61st	2000–2003	Mildred Dover	Progressive Conservative
62nd	2003–2007	Mildred Dover	Progressive Conservative

== Election results ==
2003 Prince Edward Island general election
Party	Candidate	Votes	%	±%
Progressive Conservative	Mildred A. Dover	1,628	55.28	-4.99
Liberal	Buck Watts	1,253	42.55	+8.48
New Democratic	Bob Perry	64	2.17	-3.49
Total valid votes		2,945	100.0	
Progressive Conservative hold		Swing		-6.74

2000 Prince Edward Island general election
Party	Candidate	Votes	%	±%
Progressive Conservative	Mildred A. Dover	1,737	60.27	+7.80
Liberal	Judy Hughes	982	34.07	-10.34
New Democratic	Blair W. Kelly	163	5.66	+2.54
Total valid votes		2,882	100.0	
Progressive Conservative hold		Swing		+9.07

1996 Prince Edward Island general election
Party	Candidate	Votes	%
Progressive Conservative	Mildred A. Dover	1,511	52.47
Liberal	Alan McIsaac	1,279	44.41
New Democratic	Suzanne Marie Gibler	90	3.12
Total valid votes		2,880	100.0
This riding was created from parts of the dual-member ridings of 3rd Queens and 2nd Kings.

== See also ==
- List of Prince Edward Island provincial electoral districts
- Canadian provincial electoral districts
