= Hector MacLeod =

Canadian politician

Hector Lawrence MacLeod (born June 30, 1944) is the mayor of Alberton, Prince Edward Island, a carpenter, contractor. He represented 1st Prince as Councillor (1993–1996) and then Alberton-Miminegash as MLA (1996–2000) in the Legislative Assembly of Prince Edward Island as a Liberal.

He was born in Ingonish, Nova Scotia, the son of Walter MacLeod and Julia Hardy, and was educated there. MacLeod has worked as a heavy equipment operator, as a realtor, has spent time farming and was also a fisher from 1980 to 1990. He was a member of the town council for Alberton, Prince Edward Island and served as mayor from 1979 to 1989, 1991 to 1993, since 2025. In 1967, he married Elizabeth, the daughter of Robert Erskine Campbell. MacLeod served as Liberal party whip. He was defeated when he ran for reelection in 2000.

Preceded by District created	Alberton-Miminegash; 1996–2000	Succeeded by Cletus Dunn
