= Summerside City Council =

Summerside City Council is the governing body for the city of Summerside, Prince Edward Island, Canada. The council consists of the mayor and eight councillors by ward.

== Current Summerside City Council ==
Elected in the 2022 Prince Edward Island municipal elections

- Mayor, Cory Snow (acting)
- St. Eleanors - Bayview Ward 1 Councillor, Bruce MacDougall
- St. Eleanors - Slemon Park Ward 2 Councillor, Justin Doiron
- Summerside - North Ward 3 Councillor, Nick Cameron (elected in 2023 by-election)
- Clifton - Market Ward 4 Councillor and deputy mayor, Cory Snow
- Hillcrest - Platte River Ward 5 Councillor, Ken Trenholm (elected in 2024 by-election)
- Centre East - Downtown Ward 6 Councillor, Norma McColeman
- Greenshore - Three Oaks Ward 7 Councillor, Rick Morrison
- Wilmot Ward 8 Councillor, Carrie Adams
