= Montague-Kilmuir =

Provincial electoral district in Prince Edward Island, Canada

Coordinates: 46.137°N 62.587°W

Prince Edward Island electoral district

Provincial electoral district
- Legislature: Legislative Assembly of Prince Edward Island
MLA
Cory Deagle
Progressive Conservative
- District created: 1996
- First contested: 1996
- Last contested: 2023

Demographics
- Electors (2006): 3,222

Montague-Kilmuir (District 3) is a provincial electoral district for the Legislative Assembly of Prince Edward Island, Canada.

== Members ==
The riding has elected the following members of the Legislative Assembly:

Members of the Legislative Assembly for Montague-Kilmuir
Assembly	Years	Member	Party
See 3rd Kings, 4th Kings, and 5th Kings 1873–1996
60th	1996–2000	Jim Bagnall	Progressive Conservative
61st	2000–2003	Jim Bagnall	Progressive Conservative
62nd	2003–2007	Jim Bagnall	Progressive Conservative
63rd	2007–2011	Jim Bagnall	Progressive Conservative
64th	2011–2015	Allen Roach	Liberal
65th	2015–2019	Allen Roach	Liberal
66th	2019–2023	Cory Deagle	Progressive Conservative
67th	2023–present	Cory Deagle	Progressive Conservative

== Election results ==
2023 Prince Edward Island general election
Party	Candidate	Votes	%	±%
Progressive Conservative	Cory Deagle	1,847	70.2	+23.8
Green	Norma Dingwell	379	14.4	–8.4
Liberal	Nick Sheppard	271	10.3	–16.2
Independent	Angela Reine Barton	58	2.2	–
New Democratic	Robert Lethbridge	38	1.4	–2.8
Island	Gary Robbins	38	1.4	–
Total valid votes		2,631	100.0	
Progressive Conservative hold		Swing		+18.0

2019 Prince Edward Island general election
Party	Candidate	Votes	%	±%
Progressive Conservative	Cory Deagle	1,373	46.4	+15.4
Liberal	Daphne Griffin	785	26.5	–15.3
Green	John Allen Maclean	675	22.8	+18.6
New Democratic	Billy Cann	124	4.2	–18.9
Total valid votes		2,957	100.0	
Progressive Conservative gain from Liberal		Swing		+15.4
Source: Elections Prince Edward Island

2015 Prince Edward Island general election
Party	Candidate	Votes	%	±%
Liberal	Allen Roach	1,060	41.80	-4.77
Progressive Conservative	Andrew Daggett	785	30.95	-10.54
New Democratic	Michael Redmond	585	23.07	
Green	Jason Furness	106	4.18	+0.50
Total valid votes		2,536	99.53	
Total rejected ballots		12	0.47	
Turnout		2,548	82.54	
Eligible voters		3,087		
Liberal hold		Swing		+2.88

2011 Prince Edward Island general election
Party	Candidate	Votes	%	±%
Liberal	Allen Roach	1,127	46.57	-1.00
Progressive Conservative	Greg Farrell	1,004	41.49	-10.94
Island	Billy Cann	200	8.26	
Green	Vanessa Young	89	3.68	
Total valid votes		2,420	100.0	
Liberal gain from Progressive Conservative		Swing		+4.97
Island Party candidate Billy Cann lost 39.31 percentage points from 2007, when they ran as a Liberal.

2007 Prince Edward Island general election
Party	Candidate	Votes	%	±%
Progressive Conservative	Jim Bagnall	1,447	52.43	-11.09
Liberal	Billy Cann	1,313	47.57	+12.42
Total valid votes		2,760	100.0	
Progressive Conservative hold		Swing		-11.76

2003 Prince Edward Island general election
Party	Candidate	Votes	%	±%
Progressive Conservative	Jim Bagnall	1,431	63.52	+4.31
Liberal	John Van Dyke	792	35.15	-1.99
New Democratic	Lorne Cudmore	30	1.33	-2.32
Total valid votes		2,253	100.0	
Progressive Conservative hold		Swing		+3.15

2000 Prince Edward Island general election
Party	Candidate	Votes	%	±%
Progressive Conservative	Jim Bagnall	1,379	59.21	+4.33
Liberal	Larry Stanly Creed	865	37.14	-4.88
New Democratic	Glen MacDonald	85	3.65	+0.56
Total valid votes		2,329	100.0	
Progressive Conservative hold		Swing		+4.60

1996 Prince Edward Island general election
Party	Candidate	Votes	%
Progressive Conservative	Jim Bagnall	1,259	54.88
Liberal	Beverly Deelstra	964	42.02
New Democratic	Janet L. Gillis	71	3.09
Total valid votes		2,294	100.0
This district was created from parts of the dual-member ridings of 3rd Kings, 4th Kings and 5th Kings.

=== 2016 electoral reform plebiscite results ===
2016 Prince Edward Island electoral reform referendum
Side	Votes	%
First Past the Post	329	32.54
Mixed Member Proportional	303	29.97
Dual Member Proportional Representation	205	20.28
Preferential Voting	99	9.79
First Past the Post plus leaders	75	7.42
Two-choice preferred result
Mixed Member Proportional	507	53.48
First Past the Post	441	46.52
Total votes cast	1,011	33.40
Registered voters	3,093	
Source "Plebiscite Report" (PDF).

== See also ==
- List of Prince Edward Island provincial electoral districts
- Canadian provincial electoral districts
