= Alberton-Roseville =

Former provincial electoral district in Prince Edward Island, Canada

Prince Edward Island electoral district
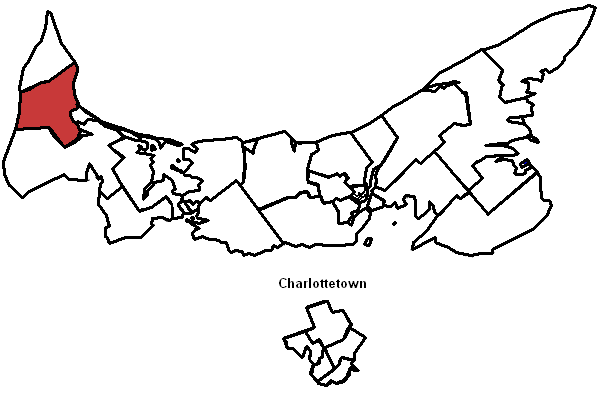
- Coordinates: 46.696°N 64.144°W

Defunct provincial electoral district
- Legislature: Legislative Assembly of Prince Edward Island
- District created: 1996
- District abolished: 2019
- First contested: 1996
- Last contested: 2015

Alberton-Roseville was a provincial electoral district for the Legislative Assembly of Prince Edward Island, Canada. It was formerly known as Alberton-Miminegash from 1996 to 2007.

It includes, among others, the following communities:

- Alberton
- Roseville
- Greenmount-Montrose
- Montrose
- Central Kildare
- Mill River East
- Union
- Brockton
- Brooklyn
- St. Edward (southern-half)
- St. Lawrence
- St. Louis (southern-half)
- Miminegash (southern-half)
- Center Line Road
- Huntley
- Alma
- Woodvale
- Elmsdale
- Northport
- Cascumpec
- Hebron

== Members ==
Members of the Legislative Assembly for Alberton-Roseville
Assembly	Years	Member	Party
See 1st Prince and 2nd Prince 1873–1996
60th	1996–2000	Hector MacLeod	Liberal
61st	2000–2003	Cletus Dunn	Progressive Conservative
62nd	2003–2007	Cletus Dunn	Progressive Conservative
63rd	2007–2011	Pat Murphy	Liberal
64th	2011–2015	Pat Murphy	Liberal
65th	2015–2019	Pat Murphy	Liberal

== Election results ==
=== Alberton-Roseville, 2007–2019 ===
2015 Prince Edward Island general election
Party	Candidate	Votes	%	±%
Liberal	Pat Murphy	1,569	53.68	-2.50
Progressive Conservative	John Griffin	1,166	39.89	+0.07
New Democratic	Orville Lewis	188	6.43	
Total valid votes		2,923	100.0	
Liberal hold		Swing		-1.28

2011 Prince Edward Island general election
Party	Candidate	Votes	%	±%
Liberal	Pat Murphy	1,604	56.18	+6.34
Progressive Conservative	David Gordon	1,137	39.82	-5.57
Green	Gerald O'Meara	71	2.49	-0.67
Island	Mitch Gallant	43	1.51	
Total valid votes		2,855	100.0	
Liberal hold		Swing		+5.96

2007 Prince Edward Island general election
Party	Candidate	Votes	%	±%
Liberal	Pat Murphy	1,487	49.84	+14.42
Progressive Conservative	Cletus Dunn	1,364	45.39	-17.23
Green	Gerald O'Meara	95	3.16	
New Democratic	Jillian Kilfoil	59	1.96	±0
Total valid votes		3,005	100.0	
Liberal gain from Progressive Conservative		Swing		+15.82

=== 2016 electoral reform plebiscite results ===
2016 Prince Edward Island electoral reform referendum
Side	Votes	%
First Past the Post	462	50.33
Mixed Member Proportional	173	18.85
Dual Member Proportional Representation	125	13.62
Preferential Voting	81	8.82
First Past the Post plus leaders	77	8.39
Total votes cast	918	25.78
Registered voters	3,561	
Source "Plebiscite Report" (PDF). Archived from the original (PDF) on 1 December 2017.

=== Alberton-Miminegash, 1996–2007 ===
2003 Prince Edward Island general election
Party	Candidate	Votes	%	±%
Progressive Conservative	Cletus Dunn	1,697	62.62	+4.08
Liberal	Robert White	960	35.42	-1.11
New Democratic	Donna Hardy	53	1.96	-2.97
Total valid votes		2,710	100.0	
Progressive Conservative hold		Swing		+2.60

2000 Prince Edward Island general election
Party	Candidate	Votes	%	±%
Progressive Conservative	Cletus Dunn	1,628	58.54	+16.06
Liberal	Hector MacLeod	1,016	36.53	-14.39
New Democratic	Donna Lewis	137	4.93	-1.67
Total valid votes		2,781	100.0	
Progressive Conservative gain from Liberal		Swing		+15.22

1996 Prince Edward Island general election
Party	Candidate	Votes	%
Liberal	Hector MacLeod	1,351	50.92
Progressive Conservative	Eddie Trail	1,127	42.48
New Democratic	Ed Kilfoil	175	6.60
Total valid votes		2,653	100.0
This district was created from parts of the dual-member ridings of 1st Prince and 2nd Prince.

== See also ==
- List of Prince Edward Island provincial electoral districts
- Canadian provincial electoral districts
