= Summerside-St. Eleanors =

Former provincial electoral district in Prince Edward Island, Canada

Prince Edward Island electoral district
- Coordinates: 46.412°N 63.802°W

Defunct provincial electoral district
- Legislature: Legislative Assembly of Prince Edward Island
- District created: 1996
- District abolished: 2019
- First contested: 1996
- Last contested: 2015

Summerside-St. Eleanors was a provincial electoral district for the Legislative Assembly of Prince Edward Island, Canada.

== Members ==
The riding has elected the following members of the Legislative Assembly:

Members of the Legislative Assembly for Summerside-St. Eleanors
Assembly	Years	Member	Party
See 4th Prince and 5th Prince 1873–1996
60th	1996–2000	Nancy Guptill	Liberal
61st	2000–2003	Helen MacDonald	Progressive Conservative
62nd	2003–2007	Helen MacDonald	Progressive Conservative
63rd	2007–2011	Gerard Greenan	Liberal
64th	2011–2015	Gerard Greenan	Liberal
65th	2015–2019	Tina Mundy	Liberal

== Election results ==
=== Summerside-St. Eleanors, 1996–2019 ===
2015 Prince Edward Island general election
Party	Candidate	Votes	%	±%
Liberal	Tina Mundy	1,246	41.15	-10.61
Progressive Conservative	Major Stewart	1,098	36.26	-1.38
New Democratic	Olivia Wood	358	11.82	+6.48
Green	Caleb Adams	326	10.77	+5.51
Total valid votes		3,028	100.0	
Liberal hold		Swing		-4.62

2011 Prince Edward Island general election
Party	Candidate	Votes	%	±%
Liberal	Gerard Greenan	1,426	51.76	−2.60
Progressive Conservative	Merlin Cormier	1,037	37.64	−1.69
New Democratic	Paulette Halupa	147	5.34	+2.87
Green	Caleb Adams	145	5.26	+2.51
Total valid votes		2,755	100.0	
Liberal hold		Swing		−0.46

2007 Prince Edward Island general election
Party	Candidate	Votes	%	±%
Liberal	Gerard Greenan	1,697	54.36	+9.06
Progressive Conservative	Brent Gallant	1,228	39.33	−12.23
Green	Stuart Smith	86	2.75	
New Democratic	Paulette Halupa	77	2.47	−0.68
Independent	John W. A. Curtis	34	1.09	
Total valid votes		3,122	100.0	
Liberal gain from Progressive Conservative		Swing		+10.64

2003 Prince Edward Island general election
Party	Candidate	Votes	%	±%
Progressive Conservative	Helen MacDonald	1,590	51.56	+0.56
Liberal	Gerard Greenan	1,397	45.30	+7.85
New Democratic	Paulette Halupa	97	3.15	-8.39
Total valid votes		3,084	100.0	
Progressive Conservative hold		Swing		-3.64

2000 Prince Edward Island general election
Party	Candidate	Votes	%	±%
Progressive Conservative	Helen MacDonald	1,626	51.00	+14.86
Liberal	Wayne Carew	1,194	37.45	-16.72
New Democratic	David Chipman	368	11.54	+1.85
Total valid votes		3,188	100.0	
Progressive Conservative gain from Liberal		Swing		+15.79

1996 Prince Edward Island general election
Party	Candidate	Votes	%
Liberal	Nancy Evelyn Guptill	1,716	54.17
Progressive Conservative	Gardiner MacNeill	1,145	36.14
New Democratic	Marsha Arsenault	307	9.69
Total valid votes		3,168	100.0
This district was created from parts of the dual-member ridings of 4th Prince and 5th Prince.

=== 2016 electoral reform plebiscite result ===
2016 Prince Edward Island electoral reform referendum
Side	Votes	%
First Past the Post	406	33.12
Mixed Member Proportional	366	29.85
Dual Member Proportional Representation	217	17.70
Preferential Voting	140	11.42
First Past the Post plus leaders	97	7.91
Two-choice preferred result
Mixed Member Proportional	613	52.71
First Past the Post	550	47.29
Total votes cast	1,226	29.68
Registered voters	4,131	
Source "Plebiscite Report" (PDF).

== See also ==
- List of Prince Edward Island provincial electoral districts
- Canadian provincial electoral districts
