= Kensington-Malpeque =

Provincial electoral district in Prince Edward Island, Canada

Coordinates: 46.484°N 63.661°W

Prince Edward Island electoral district

Provincial electoral district
- Legislature: Legislative Assembly of Prince Edward Island
MLA
Matthew MacKay
Progressive Conservative
- District created: 1996
- First contested: 1996
- Last contested: 2023

Kensington-Malpeque (District 20) is a provincial electoral district for the Legislative Assembly of Prince Edward Island, Canada.

== Members ==
The riding has elected the following members of the Legislative Assembly:

Members of the Legislative Assembly for Kensington-Malpeque
Assembly	Years	Member	Party
See 4th Prince and 1st Queens 1873–1996
60th	1996–2000	Mitch Murphy	Progressive Conservative
61st	2000–2003	Mitch Murphy	Progressive Conservative
62nd	2003–2007	Mitch Murphy	Progressive Conservative
63rd	2007–2011	Wes Sheridan	Liberal
64th	2011–2015	Wes Sheridan	Liberal
65th	2015–2019	Matthew MacKay	Progressive Conservative
66th	2019–2023	Matthew MacKay	Progressive Conservative
67th	2023–present	Matthew MacKay	Progressive Conservative

== Election results ==
2023 Prince Edward Island general election
Party	Candidate	Votes	%	±%
Progressive Conservative	Matthew MacKay	2,294	76.6	14.5
Green	Hunter Guindon	463	15.5	-9.4
Liberal	Richard Schroeter	169	5.6	-6.4
New Democratic	Maggie Larocque	67	2.2	1.3
Total valid votes		2,993	100.0	
Progressive Conservative hold		Swing		+12.0

2019 Prince Edward Island general election
Party	Candidate	Votes	%	±%
Progressive Conservative	Matthew MacKay	2,008	62.1	+7.8
Green	Matthew J. Mackay	805	24.9	+14.7
Liberal	Nancy Beth Guptill	389	12.0	-16.3
New Democratic	Carole MacFarlane	31	1.0	-6.2
Total valid votes		3,233		
Progressive Conservative hold		Swing		

2015 Prince Edward Island general election
Party	Candidate	Votes	%	±%
Progressive Conservative	Matthew MacKay	1,984	54.28	+17.68
Liberal	Paul Montgomery	1,033	28.26	-28.92
Green	Lynne Lund	374	10.23	
New Democratic	Joe Larkin	264	7.22	+1.00
Total valid votes		3,655	100.0	
Progressive Conservative gain from Liberal		Swing		+23.30

2011 Prince Edward Island general election
Party	Candidate	Votes	%	±%
Liberal	Wes Sheridan	1,820	57.18	+6.87
Progressive Conservative	Wilber Lamont	1,165	36.60	-7.69
New Democratic	George S. Hunter	198	6.22	
Total valid votes		3,183	100.0	
Liberal hold		Swing		+7.28

2007 Prince Edward Island general election
Party	Candidate	Votes	%	±%
Liberal	Wes Sheridan	1,788	50.31	+20.44
Progressive Conservative	Mitch Murphy	1,574	44.29	-23.39
Green	Jodie Bowmaster	192	5.40	
Total valid votes		3,554	100.0	
Liberal gain from Progressive Conservative		Swing		+21.92

2003 Prince Edward Island general election
Party	Candidate	Votes	%	±%
Progressive Conservative	Mitch Murphy	2,538	67.68	-6.83
Liberal	Janice Sherry	1,120	29.87	+10.50
New Democratic	George S. Hunter	92	2.45	-3.67
Total valid votes		3,750	100.0	
Progressive Conservative hold		Swing		-8.66

2000 Prince Edward Island general election
Party	Candidate	Votes	%	±%
Progressive Conservative	Mitch Murphy	2,654	74.51	+17.75
Liberal	Greg Campbell	690	19.37	-17.49
New Democratic	Clarence Fraser	218	6.12	-0.26
Total valid votes		3,562	100.0	
Progressive Conservative hold		Swing		+17.62

1996 Prince Edward Island general election
Party	Candidate	Votes	%
Progressive Conservative	Mitch Murphy	2,020	56.76
Liberal	Bill Campbell	1,312	36.86
New Democratic	Calvin C. Roberts	227	6.38
Total valid votes		3,559	100.0
This district was created from parts of the dual-member ridings of 4th Prince and 1st Queens.

=== 2016 electoral reform plebiscite results ===
2016 Prince Edward Island electoral reform referendum
Side	Votes	%
First Past the Post	514	32.99
Mixed Member Proportional	405	25.99
Dual Member Proportional Representation	331	21.25
Preferential Voting	184	11.81
First Past the Post plus leaders	124	7.96
Two-choice preferred result
Mixed Member Proportional	783	52.20
First Past the Post	717	47.80
Total votes cast	1,558	33.98
Registered voters	4,585	
Source "Plebiscite Report" (PDF). Archived from the original (PDF) on 1 December 2017.

== See also ==
- List of Prince Edward Island provincial electoral districts
- Canadian provincial electoral districts
