= West Royalty-Springvale =

Former provincial electoral district in Prince Edward Island, Canada

Prince Edward Island electoral district
- Coordinates: 46.295°N 63.221°W

Defunct provincial electoral district
- Legislature: Legislative Assembly of Prince Edward Island
- District created: 1996
- District abolished: 2019
- First contested: 1996
- Last contested: 2015

West Royalty-Springvale was a provincial electoral district for the Legislative Assembly of Prince Edward Island, Canada. It was previously known as Winsloe-West Royalty. It was abolished prior to the 2019 election into Charlottetown-Winsloe, Charlottetown-West Royalty, Brackley-Hunter River, and New Haven-Rocky Point.

== Members ==
The riding has elected the following members of the Legislative Assembly:

Members of the Legislative Assembly for West Royalty-Springvale
Assembly	Years	Member	Party
See 2nd Queens, 3rd Queens and 6th Queens 1873–1996
60th	1996–2000	Don MacKinnon	Progressive Conservative
61st	2000–2003	Don MacKinnon	Progressive Conservative
62nd	2003–2007	Wayne Collins	Progressive Conservative
63rd	2007–2011	Bush Dumville	Liberal
64th	2011–2015	Bush Dumville	Liberal
65th	2015–2018	Bush Dumville	Liberal
65th	2018–2019	Bush Dumville	Independent

== Election results ==
=== West Royalty-Springvale, 2007–2019 ===
2015 Prince Edward Island general election
Party	Candidate	Votes	%	±%
Liberal	Bush Dumville	1,389	37.57	-8.36
Progressive Conservative	Linda Clements	1,330	35.98	-7.93
New Democratic	Peter Meggs	516	13.96	+8.63
Green	Charles Sanderson	462	12.50	+7.65
Total valid votes		3,697	99.44	
Total rejected ballots		21	0.56	-0.29
Turnout		3,718	82.08	+6.76
Eligible voters		4,530		
Liberal hold		Swing		-0.21
Source: Elections Prince Edward Island

2011 Prince Edward Island general election
Party	Candidate	Votes	%	±%
Liberal	Bush Dumville	1,432	45.93	-9.14
Progressive Conservative	Gary Bowness	1,369	43.91	+3.18
New Democratic	Andrew Want	166	5.32	
Green	Liz Vaine	151	4.84	+0.63
Total valid votes		3,118	99.14	
Total rejected ballots		27	0.86	+0.52
Turnout		3,145	75.31	-8.58
Eligible voters		4,176		
Liberal hold		Swing		-6.16
Source: Elections Prince Edward Island

2007 Prince Edward Island general election
Party	Candidate	Votes	%
Liberal	Bush Dumville	1,766	55.07
Progressive Conservative	Wayne Collins	1,306	40.72
Green	Larry Cosgrave	135	4.21
Total valid votes		3,207	99.66
Total rejected ballots		11	0.34
Turnout		3,218	83.89
Eligible voters		3,836	
Source: Elections Prince Edward Island

==== 2016 electoral reform plebiscite results ====
2016 Prince Edward Island electoral reform referendum
Side	Votes	%
Mixed Member Proportional	603	31.80
First Past the Post	546	28.80
Dual Member Proportional Representation	367	19.36
Preferential Voting	198	10.44
First Past the Post plus leaders	182	9.60
Two-choice preferred result
Mixed Member Proportional	1,043	56.99
First Past the Post	787	43.01
Total votes cast	1,896	40.30
Registered voters	4,705	
Source "Plebiscite Report" (PDF). Archived from the original (PDF) on 1 December 2017.

=== Winsloe-West Royalty, 1996–2007 ===
2005 Prince Edward Island electoral reform referendum
Side	Votes	%
No	940	57.14
Yes	705	42.86
Total valid votes	1,645	99.64
Total rejected ballots	6	0.36
Turnout	1,651	33.18
Eligible voters	4,976	
Source: Elections Prince Edward Island

2003 Prince Edward Island general election
Party	Candidate	Votes	%	±%
Progressive Conservative	Wayne Collins	1,971	52.05	-10.61
Liberal	Gordon MacKay	1,816	47.95	+17.29
Total valid votes		3,787	99.32	
Total rejected ballots		26	0.68	+0.20
Turnout		3,813	76.63	-3.76
Eligible voters		4,976		
Progressive Conservative hold		Swing		-13.95
Source: Elections Prince Edward Island

2000 Prince Edward Island general election
Party	Candidate	Votes	%	±%
Progressive Conservative	Don MacKinnon	2,203	62.66	+12.86
Liberal	Peter McCloskey	1,078	30.66	-14.14
New Democratic	Marlene Hunt	235	6.68	+1.28
Total valid votes		3,516	99.52	
Total rejected ballots		17	0.48	-0.14
Turnout		3,533	80.39	-2.88
Eligible voters		4,395		
Progressive Conservative hold		Swing		+13.50
Source: Elections Prince Edward Island

1996 Prince Edward Island general election
Party	Candidate	Votes	%
Progressive Conservative	Don MacKinnon	1,751	49.80
Liberal	Perley MacNeill	1,575	44.80
New Democratic	James Rodd	190	5.40
Total valid votes		3,516	99.38
Total rejected ballots		22	0.62
Turnout		3,538	83.27
Eligible voters		4,249	
Source: Elections Prince Edward Island
This district was created from parts of the dual-member ridings of 2nd Queens, 3rd Queens and 6th Queens.

== See also ==
- List of Prince Edward Island provincial electoral districts
- Canadian provincial electoral districts
