= Kellys Cross-Cumberland =

Former provincial electoral district in Prince Edward Island, Canada

Prince Edward Island electoral district
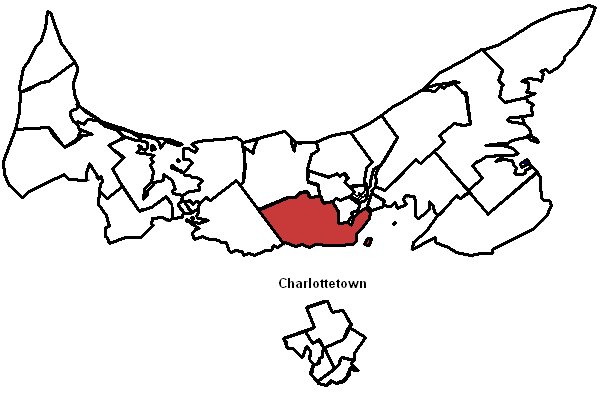
- Coordinates: 46.182°N 63.286°W

Defunct provincial electoral district
- Legislature: Legislative Assembly of Prince Edward Island
- District created: 1996
- District abolished: 2019
- First contested: 1996
- Last contested: 2015

Kellys Cross-Cumberland was a provincial electoral district for the Legislative Assembly of Prince Edward Island, Canada. It was previously known as Crapaud-Hazel Grove. It was the first provincial constituency to elect a member of the Green Party, and only the second provincial constituency to elect a member of any third party. Peter Bevan-Baker defeated the Liberal candidate Valerie Docherty in the provincial election on May 4, 2015.

== Members ==
The riding has elected the following members of the Legislative Assembly:

Members of the Legislative Assembly
Assembly	Years	Member	Party
See 1st Queens and 2nd Queens 1873-1996
Crapaud-Hazel Grove
60th	1996–2000	Norman MacPhee	Progressive Conservative
61st	2000–2003	Norman MacPhee	Progressive Conservative
62nd	2003–2007	Carolyn Bertram	Liberal
Kellys Cross-Cumberland
63rd	2007–2011	Valerie Docherty	Liberal
64th	2011–2015	Valerie Docherty	Liberal
65th	2015–2019	Peter Bevan-Baker	Green

== Election results ==
=== Kellys Cross-Cumberland, 2007–2019 ===
2015 Prince Edward Island general election
Party	Candidate	Votes	%	±%
Green	Peter Bevan-Baker	2,077	54.80	+45.44
Liberal	Valerie Docherty	1,046	27.60	-26.48
Progressive Conservative	Randy Robar	609	16.07	-13.33
New Democratic	Jesse Cousins	58	1.53	-4.04
Total valid votes		3,790	100.0	
Green gain from Liberal		Swing		+35.96

2011 Prince Edward Island general election
Party	Candidate	Votes	%	±%
Liberal	Valerie Docherty	1,768	54.08	+1.57
Progressive Conservative	Neila Auld	961	29.40	-6.73
Green	Peter Bevan-Baker	306	9.36	+2.95
New Democratic	Jesse Reddin Cousins	182	5.57	+0.61
Island	Paul Smitz	37	1.13	
Independent	Arthur C. Mackenzie, Sr.	15	0.52	
Total valid votes		3,269	100.0	
Liberal hold		Swing		+4.15

2007 Prince Edward Island general election
Party	Candidate	Votes	%	±%
Liberal	Valerie Docherty	1,811	52.51	+1.86
Progressive Conservative	Steven Stead	1,246	36.13	-10.48
Green	Peter Bevan-Baker	221	6.41	
New Democratic	Lorraine Begley	171	4.96	+2.22
Total valid votes		3,449	100.0	
Liberal hold		Swing		6.17

==== 2016 electoral reform plebiscite results ====
2016 Prince Edward Island electoral reform referendum
Side	Votes	%
Mixed Member Proportional	601	30.52
First Past the Post	535	27.17
Dual Member Proportional Representation	507	25.75
Preferential Voting	196	9.95
First Past the Post plus leaders	130	6.60
Two-choice preferred result
Mixed Member Proportional	1,162	61.42
First Past the Post	730	38.58
Total votes cast	1,969	42.76
Registered voters	4,605	
Source "Plebiscite Report" (PDF). Archived from the original (PDF) on December 1, 2017.

=== Crapaud-Hazel Grove, 1996–2007 ===
2003 Prince Edward Island general election
Party	Candidate	Votes	%	±%
Liberal	Carolyn Bertram	1,829	50.65	+15.66
Progressive Conservative	Norman MacPhee	1,683	46.61	-8.64
New Democratic	Miranda Ellis	99	2.74	-7.02
Total valid votes		3,611	100.0	
Liberal gain from Progressive Conservative		Swing		+12.15

2000 Prince Edward Island general election
Party	Candidate	Votes	%	±%
Progressive Conservative	Norman MacPhee	1,931	55.25	+7.75
Liberal	Cecil Godfrey	1,223	34.99	-8.61
New Democratic	Tony Reddin	341	9.76	+0.86
Total valid votes		3,495	100.0	
Progressive Conservative hold		Swing		+8.18

1996 Prince Edward Island general election
Party	Candidate	Votes	%
Progressive Conservative	Norman MacPhee	1,666	47.50
Liberal	Erin MacArthur	1,529	43.60
New Democratic	J'nan Brown	312	8.90
Total valid votes		3,507	100.0
This district was created from parts of the dual-member ridings of 1st Queens and 2nd Queens.

== See also ==
- List of Prince Edward Island provincial electoral districts
- Canadian provincial electoral districts
