= Charlottetown-Lewis Point =

Former provincial electoral district in Prince Edward Island, Canada

Prince Edward Island electoral district
- Coordinates: 46.260°N 63.158°W

Defunct provincial electoral district
- Legislature: Legislative Assembly of Prince Edward Island
- District created: 1996
- District abolished: 2019
- First contested: 1996
- Last contested: 2015

Demographics
- Census division: Queens County
- Census subdivision: Charlottetown

Charlottetown-Lewis Point was a provincial electoral district for the Legislative Assembly of Prince Edward Island, Canada. It was previously called Charlottetown-Spring Park.

== Members ==
The riding has elected the following members of the Legislative Assembly:

Members of the Legislative Assembly for Charlottetown-Lewis Point
Assembly	Years	Member	Party
See 5th Queens 1873–1996 and 6th Queens 1966–1996
60th	1996–2000	Wes MacAleer	Progressive Conservative
61st	2000–2003	Wes MacAleer	Progressive Conservative
62nd	2003–2007	Wes MacAleer	Progressive Conservative
63rd	2007–2011	Kathleen Casey	Liberal
64th	2011–2015	Kathleen Casey	Liberal
65th	2015–2019	Kathleen Casey	Liberal

== Election results ==
=== Charlottetown-Lewis Point, 2007–2019 ===
2015 Prince Edward Island general election
Party	Candidate	Votes	%	±%
Liberal	Kathleen Casey	1,040	34.26	-17.75
New Democratic	Gord McNeilly	931	30.67	+20.53
Progressive Conservative	Dianne Young	821	27.04	-5.95
Green	Doug Millington	244	8.04	+3.17
Total valid votes		3,036	100.0	
Liberal hold		Swing		-19.14

2011 Prince Edward Island general election
Party	Candidate	Votes	%	±%
Liberal	Kathleen Casey	1,411	52.01	-6.93
Progressive Conservative	Parnell Kelly	895	32.99	-8.07
New Democratic	Jacquie Robichaud	275	10.14	
Green	Charles Sanderson	132	4.87	
Total valid votes		2,713	100.0	
Liberal hold		Swing		+0.57

2007 Prince Edward Island general election
Party	Candidate	Votes	%	±%
Liberal	Kathleen Casey	1,865	58.94	+13.63
Progressive Conservative	Wes MacAleer	1,299	41.06	-10.54
Total valid votes		3,164	100.0	
Liberal gain from Progressive Conservative		Swing		+12.08

==== 2016 electoral reform plebiscite results ====
2016 Prince Edward Island electoral reform referendum
Side	Votes	%
Mixed Member Proportional	520	32.22
First Past the Post	435	26.95
Dual Member Proportional Representation	360	22.30
Preferential Voting	186	11.52
First Past the Post plus leaders	113	7.00
Two-choice preferred result
Mixed Member Proportional	917	59.62
First Past the Post	621	40.38
Total votes cast	1,614	41.63
Registered voters	3,877	
Source "Plebiscite Report" (PDF).

=== Charlottetown-Spring Park, 1996–2007 ===
2003 Prince Edward Island general election
Party	Candidate	Votes	%	±%
Progressive Conservative	Wes MacAleer	1,649	51.60	-3.93
Liberal	Barry Ling	1,448	45.31	+15.24
New Democratic	Teresa Peters	99	3.10	-11.30
Total valid votes		3,196	100.0	
Progressive Conservative hold		Swing		-9.58

2000 Prince Edward Island general election
Party	Candidate	Votes	%	±%
Progressive Conservative	Wes MacAleer	1,743	55.53	+12.75
Liberal	Dianne Porter	944	30.07	-2.25
New Democratic	Leo Broderick	452	14.40	-10.50
Total valid votes		3,139	100.0	
Progressive Conservative hold		Swing		+7.50

1996 Prince Edward Island general election
Party	Candidate	Votes	%
Progressive Conservative	Wes MacAleer	1,481	42.78
Liberal	Ian "Tex" MacDonald	1,119	32.32
New Democratic	Leo Broderick	862	24.90
Total valid votes		3,462	100.0
This district was created from parts of the dual-member ridings of 5th Queens and 6th Queens.

== See also ==
- List of Prince Edward Island provincial electoral districts
- Canadian provincial electoral districts
