= Souris-Elmira =

Provincial electoral district in Prince Edward Island, Canada

Prince Edward Island electoral district
- Coordinates: 46.421°N 62.244°W

Provincial electoral district
- Legislature: Legislative Assembly of Prince Edward Island
MLA
Robin Croucher
Progressive Conservative
- District created: 1996
- First contested: 1996
- Last contested: 2023

Demographics
- Electors: 3,406

Souris-Elmira (District 1) is a provincial electoral district for the Legislative Assembly of Prince Edward Island, Canada. The riding was created for the 1996 election from 1st Kings and a small part of 5th Kings and 2nd Kings.

== Members ==
The riding as elected the following members of the Legislative Assembly:

Members of the Legislative Assembly for Souris-Elmira
Assembly	Years	Member	Party
See 1st Kings, 2nd Kings and 5th Kings 1873–1996
60th	1996–2000	Andy Mooney	Progressive Conservative
61st	2000–2003	Andy Mooney	Progressive Conservative
62nd	2003–2007	Andy Mooney	Progressive Conservative
63rd	2007–2011	Allan Campbell	Liberal
64th	2011–2015	Colin LaVie	Progressive Conservative
65th	2015–2019	Colin LaVie	Progressive Conservative
66th	2019–2023	Colin LaVie	Progressive Conservative
67th	2023–present	Robin Croucher	Progressive Conservative

== Election results ==
=== 2023 ===
2023 Prince Edward Island general election
Party	Candidate	Votes	%	±%
Progressive Conservative	Robin Croucher	1,593	55.4	+10.7
Green	Boyd Leard	757	26.3	-0.4
Liberal	Amber Dennis	481	16.7	-11.9
New Democratic	Gordon Gay	29	1.0	
Island	Ahava Kàlnàssy de Kàlnàs	16	0.6	
Total valid votes		2,876	100.0	
Progressive Conservative hold		Swing		+6.5

=== 2019 ===
2019 Prince Edward Island general election
Party	Candidate	Votes	%	±%
Progressive Conservative	Colin LaVie	1,347	44.7	+0.3
Liberal	Tommy Kickham	861	28.6	-7.2
Green	Boyd Leard	804	26.7	
Total valid votes		3,012	100.0	

=== 2016 referendum ===
2016 Prince Edward Island electoral reform referendum
Side	Votes	%
First Past the Post	309	33.70
Mixed Member Proportional	248	27.04
Dual Member Proportional Representation	223	24.32
Preferential Voting	82	8.94
First Past the Post plus leaders	55	6.00
Two-choice preferred result
Mixed Member Proportional	475	54.47
First Past the Post	397	45.53
Total votes cast	917	29.51
Registered voters	3,107	
Source "Plebiscite Report" (PDF).

=== 2015 ===
2015 Prince Edward Island general election
Party	Candidate	Votes	%	±%
Progressive Conservative	Colin LaVie	1,179	44.36	-4.22
Liberal	Tommy Kickham	951	35.78	-11.68
New Democratic	Susan Birt	528	19.86	
Total valid votes		2,658	99.36	
Total rejected ballots		17	0.64	
Turnout		2,675	86.21	
Eligible voters		3,103		
Progressive Conservative hold		Swing		+3.73

=== 2011 ===
2011 Prince Edward Island general election
Party	Candidate	Votes	%	±%
Progressive Conservative	Colin LaVie	1,302	48.58	+5.68
Liberal	Allan Campbell	1,272	47.46	-2.88
Island	Jason MacGregor	106	3.96	
Total valid votes		2,680	100.0	
Progressive Conservative gain from Liberal		Swing		+4.28

=== 2007 ===
2007 Prince Edward Island general election
Party	Candidate	Votes	%	±%
Liberal	Allan Campbell	1,422	50.34	+8.30
Progressive Conservative	Andy Mooney	1,212	42.90	-15.06
New Democratic	Betty Fay	121	4.28	
Green	Rachel Leslie	70	2.48	
Total valid votes		2,825	100.0	
Liberal gain from Progressive Conservative		Swing		+11.68

=== 2005 referendum ===
2005 Prince Edward Island electoral reform referendum
Side	Votes	%
No	785	80.18
Yes	194	19.82

=== 2003 ===
2003 Prince Edward Island general election
Party	Candidate	Votes	%	±%
Progressive Conservative	Andy Mooney	1,355	57.96	-5.03
Liberal	Philip MacDonald	983	42.04	+12.25
Total valid votes		2,338	100.0	
Progressive Conservative hold		Swing		-8.64

=== 2000 ===
2000 Prince Edward Island general election
Party	Candidate	Votes	%	±%
Progressive Conservative	Andy Mooney	1,535	62.99	+11.51
Liberal	Brian Brown	726	29.79	-16.57
New Democratic	Betty Fay	176	7.22	+5.06
Total valid votes		2,437	100.0	
Progressive Conservative hold		Swing		+14.04

=== 1996 ===
1996 Prince Edward Island general election
Party	Candidate	Votes	%
Progressive Conservative	Andy Mooney	1,287	51.48
Liberal	Ross Young	1,159	46.36
New Democratic	Brian Ade MacDonald	54	2.16
Total valid votes		2,500	100.0
This district was created from parts of the dual-member ridings of 1st Kings, 5th Kings and 2nd Kings.

== See also ==
- List of Prince Edward Island provincial electoral districts
- Canadian provincial electoral districts
