= Philip Brown (Prince Edward Island politician) =

Canadian politician

Philip William Brown

Member of the Legislative Assembly of Prince Edward Island for Cascumpec-Grand River
- In office April 17, 2000 – May 28, 2007
- Preceded by: Keith Milligan
- Succeeded by: Paula Biggar

Personal details
- Born: February 5, 1957 (age 69)
- Party: Progressive Conservative

Philip Brown is a Canadian politician, who was a member of the Legislative Assembly of Prince Edward Island from 2000 to 2007. He represented the electoral district of Cascumpec-Grand River and was a member of the Progressive Conservative Party. He served as Minister of Tourism from 2003 to 2007. His achievements as Minister include, growing the airline passenger service to PEI by attracting Delta, NorthWest and WestJet airlines, creating major outdoor concerts with The Black Eyed Peas and Aerosmith, and forming the Tourism Advisory Council (TAC) to develop tourism product, marketing strategies and industry research.

Brown sought the Conservative Party of Canada nomination for Egmont for the 40th Canadian federal election in competition against his former caucus colleague Gail Shea, who was successful in winning the seat for the Conservatives after the Liberals holding it for 30 years. Brown served as Shea's campaign manager and now works as Director of Regional Affairs in the PEI MRO. Brown also managed Shea's successful re-election campaign when Shea earned more than 54% of the vote and won over her Liberal opponent by 4500 votes.

== Criticism ==
Brown faced criticism in 2004 for the personal use of his government vehicle. Opposition Leader Ron MacKinley brought the issue to the floor of Province House indicating that Brown had helped his wife "clean post offices in the western end of Prince Edward Island" with the use of his government vehicle.

Brown was criticized in 2007 by then Liberal Tourism critic Carolyn Bertram by including a return address in Calais, Maine on promotional materials sent to other Atlantic provinces.
