= Tyne Valley-Linkletter =

Former provincial electoral district in Prince Edward Island, Canada

Prince Edward Island electoral district
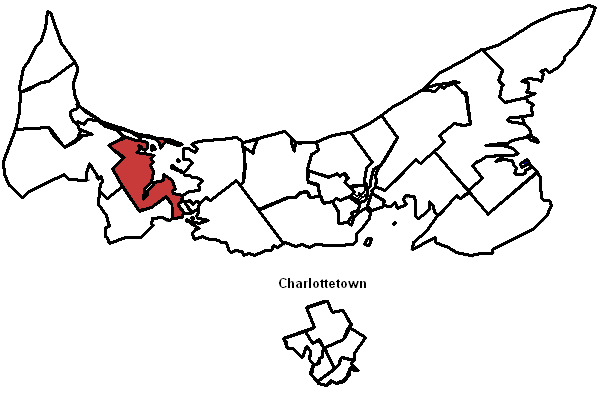
- Coordinates: 46.525°N 63.891°W

Defunct provincial electoral district
- Legislature: Legislative Assembly of Prince Edward Island
- District created: 1996
- District abolished: 2019
- First contested: 1996
- Last contested: 2015

Tyne Valley-Linkletter was a provincial electoral district for the Legislative Assembly of Prince Edward Island, Canada. The district was formerly named Cascumpec-Grand River from 1996 to 2007. In 2017, the district boundaries were adjusted to include northern portions of the city of Summerside, and the district was renamed Tyne Valley-Sherbrooke.

== Members ==
The riding has elected the following members of the Legislative Assembly:

Members of the Legislative Assembly for Tyne Valley-Linkletter
Assembly	Years	Member	Party
See 2nd Prince and 3rd Prince 1873–1996
60th	1996–2000	Keith Milligan	Liberal
61st	2000–2003	Philip Brown	Progressive Conservative
62nd	2003–2007	Philip Brown	Progressive Conservative
63rd	2007–2011	Paula Biggar	Liberal
64th	2011–2015	Paula Biggar	Liberal
65th	2015–2019	Paula Biggar	Liberal

== Election results ==
=== Tyne Valley-Linkletter, 2007–2019 ===
2015 Prince Edward Island general election
Party	Candidate	Votes	%	±%
Liberal	Paula Biggar	1,147	42.96	-14.38
Progressive Conservative	Ryan Williams	810	30.34	-12.32
New Democratic	Jacqueline Tuplin	473	17.72	
Green	Shelagh Young	240	8.99	
Total valid votes		2,670	100.0	
Liberal hold		Swing		-1.03

2011 Prince Edward Island general election
Party	Candidate	Votes	%	±%
Liberal	Paula Biggar	1,394	57.34	-0.72
Progressive Conservative	Jim Henwood	1,037	42.66	+0.72
Total valid votes		2,431	100.0	
Liberal hold		Swing		-0.72

2007 Prince Edward Island general election
Party	Candidate	Votes	%	±%
Liberal	Paula Biggar	1,599	58.06	+20.84
Progressive Conservative	Philip Brown	1,155	41.94	-14.09
Total valid votes		2,754	100.0	
Liberal gain from Progressive Conservative		Swing		+17.46

==== 2016 electoral reform plebiscite results ====
2016 Prince Edward Island electoral reform referendum
Side	Votes	%
First Past the Post	337	34.60
Mixed Member Proportional	265	27.21
Dual Member Proportional Representation	183	18.79
Preferential Voting	117	12.01
First Past the Post plus leaders	72	7.39
Two-choice preferred result
Mixed Member Proportional	477	50.53
First Past the Post	467	49.47
Total votes cast	974	27.88
Registered voters	3,493	
Source "Plebiscite Report" (PDF).

=== Cascumpec-Grand River, 1996–2007 ===
2003 Prince Edward Island general election
Party	Candidate	Votes	%	±%
Progressive Conservative	Philip Brown	1,477	56.03	+13.49
Liberal	Robert Noye	981	37.22	-4.41
New Democratic	Peter Robinson	178	6.75	-9.08
Total valid votes		2,636	100.0	
Progressive Conservative hold		Swing		+8.95

2000 Prince Edward Island general election
Party	Candidate	Votes	%	±%
Progressive Conservative	Philip Brown	1,118	42.54	+16.06
Liberal	Rob Henderson	1,094	41.63	-25.89
New Democratic	Peter Robinson	416	15.83	+9.83
Total valid votes		2,628	100.0	
Progressive Conservative gain from Liberal		Swing		+20.98

1996 Prince Edward Island general election
Party	Candidate	Votes	%
Liberal	Keith Wayne Milligan	1,823	67.52
Progressive Conservative	Barry Balsom	715	26.48
New Democratic	Donna Lewis	162	6.00
Total valid votes		2,700	100.0
This riding was created from parts of the dual-member ridings of 2nd Prince and 3rd Prince.

== See also ==
- List of Prince Edward Island provincial electoral districts
- Canadian provincial electoral districts
