= Rustico-Emerald =

Provincial electoral district in Prince Edward Island, Canada

Prince Edward Island electoral district
- Coordinates: 46.379°N 63.334°W

Provincial electoral district
- Legislature: Legislative Assembly of Prince Edward Island
MLA
Brad Trivers
Progressive Conservative
- District created: 1996
- First contested: 1996
- Last contested: 2023

Rustico-Emerald (District 18) is a provincial electoral district for the Legislative Assembly of Prince Edward Island, Canada. It was formerly known as Park Corner-Oyster Bed.

== Members ==
The riding has elected the following members of the Legislative Assembly:

Members of the Legislative Assembly for Summerside-Wilmot
Assembly	Years	Member	Party
See 1st Queens, 2nd Queens, and 3rd Queens 1873–1996
60th	1996–2000	Beth MacKenzie	Progressive Conservative
61st	2000–2003	Beth MacKenzie	Progressive Conservative
62nd	2003–2007	Beth MacKenzie	Progressive Conservative
63rd	2007–2011	Carolyn Bertram	Liberal
64th	2011–2015	Carolyn Bertram	Liberal
65th	2015–2019	Brad Trivers	Progressive Conservative
66th	2019–2023	Brad Trivers	Progressive Conservative
67th	2023–present	Brad Trivers	Progressive Conservative

== Election results ==
=== Rustico-Emerald, 2007–present ===
2023 Prince Edward Island general election
Party	Candidate	Votes	%	±%
Progressive Conservative	Brad Trivers	1,990	62.5	+5.0
Green	Ranald MacFarlane	559	17.6	-9.4
Liberal	Flory Sanderson	532	16.7	+2.1
New Democratic	David Wilson	102	3.2	+2.3
Total valid votes		3,408	100.0	
Progressive Conservative hold		Swing		+7.2

2019 Prince Edward Island general election
Party	Candidate	Votes	%	±%
Progressive Conservative	Brad Trivers	1,918	57.5%	+10.27
Green	Colin Jeffrey	899	26.9%	+17.22
Liberal	Sandy MacKay	489	14.7%	-19.63
New Democratic	Sean Deagle	30	0.9%	-7.86
Total valid votes			100.0	
Progressive Conservative hold		Swing		

2015 Prince Edward Island general election
Party	Candidate	Votes	%	±%
Progressive Conservative	Brad Trivers	1,585	47.23	+2.91
Liberal	Bertha Campbell	1,152	34.33	-15.17
Green	Marianne Janowicz	325	9.68	+3.50
New Democratic	Leah-Jane Hayward	294	8.76	
Total valid votes		3,356	100.0	
Progressive Conservative gain from Liberal		Swing		+9.04

2011 Prince Edward Island general election
Party	Candidate	Votes	%	±%
Liberal	Carolyn Bertram	1,498	49.50	-10.78
Progressive Conservative	Brad Trivers	1,341	44.32	+10.63
Green	Ron Wagner	187	6.18	+0.15
Total valid votes		3,026	100.0	
Liberal hold		Swing		-10.70

2007 Prince Edward Island general election
Party	Candidate	Votes	%	±%
Liberal	Carolyn Bertram	1,970	60.28	+16.82
Progressive Conservative	David Blacquiere	1,101	33.69	-17.88
Green	Sharon Labchuk	197	6.03	
Total valid votes		3,268	100.0	
Liberal gain from Progressive Conservative		Swing		+17.35

==== 2016 electoral reform plebiscite results ====
2016 Prince Edward Island electoral reform referendum
Side	Votes	%
First Past the Post	510	32.53
Mixed Member Proportional	425	27.10
Dual Member Proportional Representation	398	25.38
Preferential Voting	136	8.67
First Past the Post plus leaders	99	6.31
Two-choice preferred result
Mixed Member Proportional	824	54.75
First Past the Post	681	45.25
Total votes cast	1,568	38.79
Registered voters	4,042	
Source "Plebiscite Report" (PDF).

=== Park Corner-Oyster Bed, 1996–2007 ===
2003 Prince Edward Island general election
Party	Candidate	Votes	%	±%
Progressive Conservative	Beth MacKenzie	1,908	51.57	-7.01
Liberal	Jean Tingley	1,608	43.46	+9.91
New Democratic	Ken Bingham	184	4.97	-2.90
Total valid votes		3,700	99.62	
Total rejected ballots		14	0.38	-0.09
Turnout		3,714	86.05	+3.54
Eligible voters		4,316		
Progressive Conservative hold		Swing		-8.46

2000 Prince Edward Island general election
Party	Candidate	Votes	%	±%
Progressive Conservative	Beth MacKenzie	2,135	58.57	+8.78
Liberal	Allan Ling	1,223	33.55	-11.55
New Democratic	James Rodd	287	7.87	+2.77
Total valid votes		3,645	99.54	
Total rejected ballots		17	0.46	-0.02
Turnout		3,662	82.51	-1.93
Eligible voters		4,438		
Progressive Conservative hold		Swing		+10.16

1996 Prince Edward Island general election
Party	Candidate	Votes	%
Progressive Conservative	Beth MacKenzie	1,824	49.80
Liberal	Gordon MacInnis	1,652	45.10
New Democratic	Gerard Gallant	187	5.11
Total valid votes		3,663	99.51
Total rejected ballots		18	0.49
Turnout		3,681	84.45
Eligible voters		4,359	
This district was created from parts of the dual-member ridings of 1st Queens, 2nd Queens and 3rd Queens.

== See also ==
- List of Prince Edward Island provincial electoral districts
- Canadian provincial electoral districts
