= Wilfred Arsenault =

Canadian politician

Joseph Wilfred Arsenault (November 22, 1953 – July 27, 2011) was a political figure on Prince Edward Island, Canada. He represented Evangeline-Miscouche in the Legislative Assembly of Prince Edward Island from 2000 to 2007 as a Progressive Conservative member.

He was born in St. Nicholas, Prince Edward Island, the son of Euclide Arsenault and Julie Ann Poirier. He was educated at the Institute of Canadian Bankers and was employed as an assistant bank manager before entering politics. In 1990, Arsenault married Emily Duffy. He was defeated by Sonny Gallant when he ran for reelection in 2007.

Arsenault lived in Summerside from 1984 until 2003 when he moved to Miscouche.

In 2007, Arsenault entered the race to become the Conservative candidate in the federal riding of Egmont, but lost to Gail Shea.

On July 27, 2011, he died of cancer at the age of 57.
