= Don MacKinnon =

Canadian politician

Donald G. MacKinnon

Member of the Legislative Assembly of Prince Edward Island for Winsloe-West Royalty
- In office November 18, 1996 – September 29, 2003
- Preceded by: Riding Established
- Succeeded by: Wayne Collins

Personal details
- Born: February 3, 1949 (age 77)
- Party: Progressive Conservative

Donald G. MacKinnon (born 3 February 1949) is a former Canadian politician, who represented the electoral district of Winsloe-West Royalty in the Legislative Assembly of Prince Edward Island from 1996 to 2003. He was a member of the Prince Edward Island Progressive Conservative Party.

In July 1998, MacKinnon was appointed to the Executive Council of Prince Edward Island as Minister of Development. In May 2000, he was moved to Minister of Transportation and Public Works. He was shuffled out of cabinet in August 2002.
