= Helen MacDonald (Prince Edward Island politician) =

Canadian politician

MLA for St. Eleanors-Summerside
- In office 2000–2007
- Preceded by: Nancy Guptill
- Succeeded by: Gerard Greenan

Personal details
- Born: June 13, 1947 (age 78) Summerside, Prince Edward Island
- Party: Progressive Conservative

Helen Mae MacDonald (born June 13, 1947) is a Canadian politician, who was a member of the Legislative Assembly of Prince Edward Island from 2000 to 2007. She represented the electoral district of St. Eleanors-Summerside and was a member of the Progressive Conservative Party.

She was born Helen Mae Mills in Summerside, Prince Edward Island, the daughter of Kenneth Mills and Marjorie Bryenton, and was educated at the Central School for Nursing Assistants. She worked as a nursing assistant at Prince County Hospital. Mills later operated a craft shop. In 1968, she married John MacDonald.

MacDonald did not run for reelection in 2007.

She should not be confused with the Helen MacDonald who led the New Democratic Party in Nova Scotia from 2000 to 2001.
