= Mildred Dover =

Canadian politician

Mildred A. Dover

27th Speaker of the Legislative Assembly of Prince Edward Island
- In office May 11, 2000 – October 8, 2003
- Preceded by: Wilbur MacDonald
- Succeeded by: Greg Deighan

Member of the Legislative Assembly of Prince Edward Island for Tracadie-Fort Augustus
- In office November 18, 1996 – May 28, 2007
- Preceded by: Riding Established
- Succeeded by: Buck Watts

Personal details
- Born: April 12, 1941 (age 85) Fanningbrook, Prince Edward Island
- Party: Progressive Conservative

Mildred Alice Dover (born 12 April 1941) is a former educator and Canadian politician, who was a member of the Legislative Assembly of Prince Edward Island from 1996 to 2007.

A native of Fanningbrook, Prince Edward Island, she represented the electoral district of Tracadie-Fort Augustus and was a member of the Progressive Conservative Party. She served in the provincial cabinet as Minister of Health and Social Services, Attorney General and Minister of Education. Dover served as Speaker of the Legislative Assembly of Prince Edward Island from 2000 to 2003.

Dover was educated at Prince of Wales College and the University of Prince Edward Island. She taught school for 35 years and then began a career as a real estate agent in 1993. Dover was an unsuccessful candidate for a seat in the provincial assembly in 1993.
