= Cletus Dunn =

Canadian politician and civil servant

MLA for Alberton-Miminegash
- In office 2000–2007
- Preceded by: Hector MacLeod
- Succeeded by: Pat Murphy

Personal details
- Born: May 11, 1948 (age 77) Morell, Prince Edward Island
- Party: Progressive Conservative

Cletus Dunn (born May 11, 1948) is a Canadian politician, who was a member of the Legislative Assembly of Prince Edward Island from 2000 to 2007.

Born in Morell, Prince Edward Island, the son of Frank Dunn and Eileen O'Brien, Dunn received a BSc from the University of Prince Edward Island. In 1969, he married Linda MacDonald. He represented the electoral district of Alberton-Miminegash and was a member of the Progressive Conservative Party.

Dunn is the father of 5 children; one of which also ran as a MLA for the PC's and lost by a very small margin of votes. He was also part of Canada Games teams from P.E.I. as a missionary chief.
