= Vernon River-Stratford =

Former provincial electoral district in Prince Edward Island, Canada

Prince Edward Island electoral district
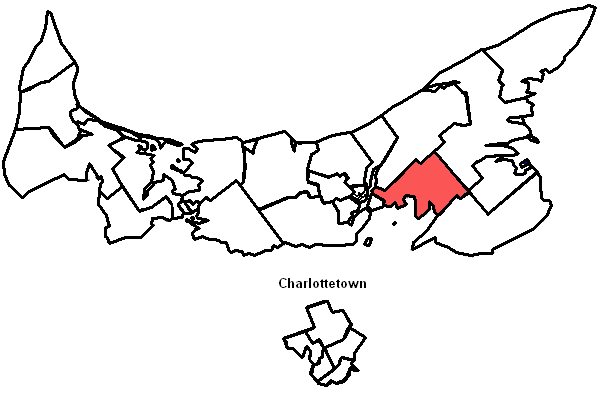
- Coordinates: 46.226°N 62.922°W

Defunct provincial electoral district
- Legislature: Legislative Assembly of Prince Edward Island
- District created: 1996
- District abolished: 2019
- First contested: 1996
- Last contested: 2015

Vernon River-Stratford was a provincial electoral district for the Legislative Assembly of Prince Edward Island, Canada. It was previously known as Belfast-Pownal Bay.

== Members ==
Members of the Legislative Assembly for Vernon River-Stratford
| Assembly | Years | Member | Party |
|---|---|---|---|
See 3rd Queens and 4th Queens 1873–1996
| 60th | 1996–2000 | Wilbur MacDonald | Progressive Conservative |
| 61st | 2000–2003 | Wilbur MacDonald | Progressive Conservative |
| 62nd | 2003–2007 | Wilbur MacDonald | Progressive Conservative |
| 63rd | 2007–2011 | Alan McIsaac | Liberal |
| 64th | 2011–2015 | Alan McIsaac | Liberal |
| 65th | 2015–2019 | Alan McIsaac | Liberal |

== Election results ==
=== Vernon River-Stratford, 2007–2019 ===
2015 Prince Edward Island general election
| Party | Candidate | Votes | % | ±% |
|---|---|---|---|---|
| Liberal | Alan McIsaac | 1,173 | 41.32 | -9.20 |
| Progressive Conservative | Mary Ellen McInnis | 1,173 | 41.32 | +0.70 |
| New Democratic | Kathleen Romans | 258 | 9.09 | +4.81 |
| Green | Nick Graveline | 235 | 8.28 | +3.69 |
| Total valid votes | | 2,839 | 100.0 | |
| Liberal hold | | Swing | | -4.95 |
These election results were subject to a judicial recount. McIsaac was elected after a coin toss.

2011 Prince Edward Island general election
| Party | Candidate | Votes | % | ±% |
|---|---|---|---|---|
| Liberal | Alan McIsaac | 1,311 | 50.52 | +2.49 |
| Progressive Conservative | Mary Ellen McInnis | 1,054 | 40.62 | -5.12 |
| Green | Marion Pirch | 119 | 4.59 | +1.13 |
| New Democratic | Edith Perry | 111 | 4.28 | +1.51 |
| Total valid votes | | 2,595 | 100.0 | |
| Liberal hold | | Swing | | +3.80 |

2007 Prince Edward Island general election
| Party | Candidate | Votes | % | ±% |
|---|---|---|---|---|
| Liberal | Alan McIsaac | 1,387 | 48.03 | +6.42 |
| Progressive Conservative | Allan Fraser | 1,321 | 45.74 | -8.46 |
| Green | Gary Clauseheide | 100 | 3.46 | |
| New Democratic | Edith Perry | 80 | 2.77 | -1.43 |
| Total valid votes | | 2,888 | 100.0 | |
| Liberal gain from Progressive Conservative | | Swing | | +7.44 |

==== 2016 electoral reform plebiscite results ====
2016 Prince Edward Island electoral reform referendum
| Side | Votes | % |
|---|---|---|
| Mixed Member Proportional | 403 | 31.05 |
| First Past the Post | 385 | 29.66 |
| Dual Member Proportional Representation | 261 | 20.11 |
| Preferential Voting | 150 | 11.56 |
| First Past the Post plus leaders | 99 | 7.63 |
Two-choice preferred result
| Mixed Member Proportional | 692 | 56.63 |
| First Past the Post | 530 | 43.37 |
| Total votes cast | 1,298 | 37.22 |
| Registered voters | 3,487 | |
Source "Plebiscite Report" (PDF). Archived from the original (PDF) on 1 December 2017.

=== Belfast-Pownal Bay, 1996–2007 ===
2003 Prince Edward Island general election
| Party | Candidate | Votes | % | ±% |
|---|---|---|---|---|
| Progressive Conservative | Wilbur B. MacDonald | 1,421 | 54.20 | -5.67 |
| Liberal | Sarah Jane Bell | 1,091 | 41.61 | +6.79 |
| New Democratic | Michael Page | 110 | 4.20 | -1.11 |
| Total valid votes | | 2,622 | 100.0 | |
| Progressive Conservative hold | | Swing | | -6.23 |

2000 Prince Edward Island general election
| Party | Candidate | Votes | % | ±% |
|---|---|---|---|---|
| Progressive Conservative | Wilbur B. MacDonald | 1,611 | 59.87 | +11.13 |
| Liberal | Ernie Mutch | 937 | 34.82 | -12.66 |
| New Democratic | Mark Hansen | 143 | 5.31 | +1.53 |
| Total valid votes | | 2,691 | 100.0 | |
| Progressive Conservative hold | | Swing | | +11.90 |

1996 Prince Edward Island general election
| Party | Candidate | Votes | % |
|---|---|---|---|
| Progressive Conservative | Wilbur B. MacDonald | 1,275 | 48.74 |
| Liberal | Lynwood MacPherson | 1,242 | 47.48 |
| New Democratic | Edith Perry | 99 | 3.78 |
| Total valid votes | | 2,616 | 100.0 |
This district was created from parts of the dual-member ridings of 3rd Queens and 4th Queens.

== See also ==
- List of Prince Edward Island provincial electoral districts
- Canadian provincial electoral districts
