= Elmer MacFadyen =

Canadian politician

Elmer E. MacFadyen

Member of the Legislative Assembly of Prince Edward Island for Sherwood-Hillsborough
- In office November 18, 1996 – May 28, 2007
- Preceded by: Riding Established
- Succeeded by: Doug Currie

Personal details
- Born: January 9, 1943 Charlottetown, Prince Edward Island
- Died: August 17, 2007 (aged 64)
- Party: Progressive Conservative

Elmer Eric MacFadyen (January 9, 1943 – August 17, 2007) was a Canadian politician. He represented Sherwood-Hillsborough in the Legislative Assembly of Prince Edward Island from 1996 to 2007 as a Progressive Conservative member.

MacFadyen was born in Charlottetown, Prince Edward Island, the son of Donald & Annie MacFadyen. He married Judy McAlduff in 1968. MacFadyen was named government house leader in 1996 and was appointed to cabinet as Minister of Community and Cultural Affairs in August 2002. He was defeated in the 2007 general election held in May 2007. MacFadyen suffered a massive heart attack at his home in Charlottetown in August of that year and died in hospital. He was 64 years old.
