= Jim Bagnall =

Canadian politician

James D. Bagnall

Member of the Legislative Assembly of Prince Edward Island for Montague-Kilmuir
- In office November 27, 1996 – October 18, 2011
- Preceded by: First Member
- Succeeded by: Allen Roach

Interim leader of the Progressive Conservative Party of Prince Edward Island
- In office May 26, 2010 – October 2, 2010
- Preceded by: Olive Crane (interim)
- Succeeded by: Olive Crane

Personal details
- Born: February 15, 1949 (age 77) Bedeque, Prince Edward Island
- Spouse: Eileen Bagnall
- Occupation: Store Manager

James (Jim) Douglas Bagnall (born 15 February 1949) is a Canadian politician, who was elected to the Legislative Assembly of Prince Edward Island in the 1996 provincial election. Bagnall is married to Eileen (Craig) Bagnall. They have four kids, Douglas, Craig, Tara and Tanya. He represented the electoral district of Montague-Kilmuir as a member of the Progressive Conservative Party. In June 2010, he was named interim leader of the Progressive Conservatives after Olive Crane resigned to run for the party's permanent leadership in the October 2010 convention.

A former retail store owner, Bagnall served on the town council for Montague from 1990 to 1996. He served in the provincial cabinet as Minister of Agriculture, Fisheries and Aquaculture.
