= Beth MacKenzie =

Canadian politician and registered nurse

MLA for Park Corner-Oyster Bed
- In office 1996–2007
- Preceded by: first membe
- Succeeded by: Carolyn Bertram

Personal details
- Born: May 3, 1960 Charlottetown, Prince Edward Island
- Died: November 20, 2013 (aged 53) Meadowbank, Prince Edward Island
- Party: Progressive Conservative

Elizabeth Lee Ann "Beth" MacKenzie (May 3, 1960 – November 20, 2013) was a registered nurse and former politician on Prince Edward Island, Canada. She was a member of the Legislative Assembly of Prince Edward Island elected in the general election of 1996, 2000 and 2003. She represented the electoral district of Park Corner-Oyster Bed and was a member of the Progressive Conservative Party.

Born in Charlottetown, Prince Edward Island, she was the youngest of the six children of Mary Cummings and Stephen MacMillan, who was the son of former premier William J. P. MacMillan. She was educated at the Prince Edward Island School of Nursing. She died suddenly on November 20, 2013.
