= Wes MacAleer =

Canadian politician (1944–2026)

Member of the Legislative Assembly of Prince Edward Island for Charlottetown-Spring Park
- In office November 18, 1996 – May 28, 2007
- Preceded by: Riding Established
- Succeeded by: Kathleen Casey

Personal details
- Born: February 12, 1944 Summerside, Prince Edward Island, Canada
- Died: September 19, 2026 (aged 82) Charlottetown, Prince Edward Island, Canada
- Party: Progressive Conservative

John Weston MacAleer (February 12, 1944 – September 19, 2026) was a Canadian politician, who was a member of the Legislative Assembly of Prince Edward Island from 1996 to 2007.

== Life and career ==
Wes MacAleer was born in Summerside, Prince Edward Island on February 12, 1944. Educated at Saint Dunstan's University, MacAleer was a newspaper publisher. He spent 18 years in the Northwest Territories, where he helped introduce cable television and satellite communications technology. He ran in the Yellowknife South district in the 1979 Northwest Territories general election and finished second. As a politician, he represented the electoral district of Charlottetown-Spring Park and was a member of the Progressive Conservative Party. MacAleer served in the provincial cabinet as Minister of Economic Development and Tourism.

MacAleer died in Charlottetown on September 19, 2026, at the age of 82.
