= Mitch Murphy =

Canadian educator and politician

P. Mitchell Murphy

Provincial Treasurer of Prince Edward Island
- In office October 9, 2003 – June 12, 2007
- Premier: Pat Binns
- Preceded by: Pat Mella
- Succeeded by: Wes Sheridan

Member of the Legislative Assembly of Prince Edward Island for Kensington-Malpeque
- In office November 18, 1996 – May 28, 2007
- Preceded by: Riding Established
- Succeeded by: Wes Sheridan

Personal details
- Born: October 28, 1962 (age 63) Kensington, Prince Edward Island, Canada
- Party: Progressive Conservative
- Occupation: Educator

P. Mitchell Murphy (born October 28, 1962) is a retired Canadian educator and former politician in the province of Prince Edward Island. He was a member of the Legislative Assembly of Prince Edward Island from 1996 to 2007. He is a member of the Progressive Conservative Party.

== Career ==
Murphy was born in Kensington, Prince Edward Island, the son of Earle and Donna Murphy. A graduate of the University of Prince Edward Island with a graduate degree in education from Saint Mary's University, he served in the PEI Cabinet in a variety of different positions: Minister of Community Affairs and Attorney General (1996–98), Minister Responsible for Acadian and Francophone Affairs (1996–2003), Minister of Technology and Environment (1998–2000), Provincial Treasurer (2003–07), Minister Responsible for the Public Service Commission (2003–07), Minister Responsible for the PEI Harness Racing Commission (2003–07). In 2007, Murphy was reprimanded in the legislature for failing to disclose that he was a shareholder in his father's company. He was defeated when he ran for reelection in 2007.

== Personal life ==
Murphy lives in Kensington with his wife Anne Marie (née Aylward) and two daughters, Emily and Mairead.
