= Andy Mooney (politician) =

Canadian politician

Andrew R. Mooney

MLA for Souris-Elmira
- In office 1996–2007
- Preceded by: first member
- Succeeded by: Allan Campbell

Personal details
- Born: March 24, 1965 (age 61)
- Party: Progressive Conservative

Andrew (Andy) Robert Mooney (born March 24, 1965) is a Canadian politician, who was a member of the Legislative Assembly of Prince Edward Island from 1996 to 2007. He represented the electoral district of Souris-Elmira and was a member of the Progressive Conservative Party.

The son of Arthur Mooney, he was employed with Arthur Mooney and Sons Farm and with the Canadian Forces. Mooney served as deputy speaker in the provincial assembly.
