= Wilbur MacDonald =

Canadian politician (1933–2020)

Member of Parliament for Cardigan
- In office 22 May 1979 – 18 February 1980
- Preceded by: Daniel J. MacDonald
- Succeeded by: Daniel J. MacDonald

MLA (Assemblyman) for 4th Queens
- In office 27 September 1982 – 29 May 1989
- Preceded by: Angus MacLean
- Succeeded by: Alan Buchanan

MLA for Belfast-Pownal Bay
- In office 18 November 1996 – 28 May 2007
- Preceded by: first member
- Succeeded by: Alan McIsaac

Personal details
- Born: Wilbur Bernard MacDonald; 13 September 1933 Orwell, Prince Edward Island
- Died: 20 May 2020 (aged 86) Prince Edward Island
- Party: Progressive Conservative
- Occupation: farmer

Wilbur Bernard MacDonald (13 September 1933 – 20 May 2020) was a Progressive Conservative party member of the House of Commons of Canada. He was a farmer by career.

The son of Leo R. MacDonald and Helen MacDonald, MacDonald was educated in Orwell. He married Pauline Murphy in 1958.

He represented Prince Edward Island's Cardigan electoral district, which he won in the 1979 federal election. After serving his only term, the 31st Canadian Parliament, he was defeated in the 1980 federal election by Daniel J. MacDonald of the Liberal Party. He was subsequently elected to the Legislative Assembly of Prince Edward Island as an MLA for 4th Queens in the 1982 election, and served until 1989. MacDonald served in the province's Executive Assembly as Minister of Industry from 1984 to 1986.

When the provincial ridings were redistricted in 1996, he became MLA for Belfast-Pownal Bay, which he held until his retirement from politics in 2007. MacDonald was speaker for the provincial assembly from 1997 to 2000.

MacDonald made two further unsuccessful attempts to reenter federal politics, first in a 13 April 1981 by-election and then in the 1993 federal election. MacDonald died on 20 May 2020, aged 86.
