= 2025 Canadian electoral calendar =

2025 elections in Canada

This is a list of elections in Canada that were held in 2025. Included are municipal, provincial and federal elections, by-elections on any level, referendums and party leadership races at any level.

== Overview of key electoral events ==
=== General elections ===
Date	Jurisdiction	Party before	First minister before	Party after	First minister after	Swing
February 27	Ontario	Progressive Conservative; 79 / 124	Doug Ford	Progressive Conservative; 80 / 124	Doug Ford	–1.95% –2 seats (Note: Swing to Liberals who came in second in vote share, but third in seat count)
April 28	Federal	Liberal; 152 / 338	Mark Carney	Liberal; 169 / 343	Mark Carney	1.79% –3½ seats
October 14	Newfoundland and Labrador	Liberal; 19 / 40	John Hogan	Progressive Conservative; 21 / 40	Tony Wakeham	5.19% 5½ seats
October 27	Nunavut	Consensus government	P.J. Akeeagok	Consensus government	John Main	—N/a
November 3	Yukon	Liberal; 8 / 19	Mike Pemberton	Yukon Party; 14 / 21	Currie Dixon	17.39% 6½ seats

=== By-elections ===
Date	Juris	Electoral District	Party before	Member before	Party after	Member after	Swing
March 17	QC	Terrebonne	CAQ	Pierre Fitzgibbon	PQ	Catherine Gentilcore	27.27%
March 18	MB	Transcona	NDP	Nello Altomare	NDP	Shannon Corbett	6.75%
June 23	AB	Olds-Didsbury-Three Hills	UCP	Nathan Cooper	UCP	Tara Sawyer	–7.67%
June 23	AB	Edmonton-Ellerslie	NDP	Rod Loyola	NDP	Gurtej Singh Brar	–6.07%
June 23	AB	Edmonton-Strathcona	NDP	Rachel Notley	NDP	Naheed Nenshi	3.13%
August 11	QC	Arthabaska	CAQ	Eric Lefebvre	PQ	Alex Boissonneault	40.45%
August 12	PE	Charlottetown-Hillsborough Park	PC	Natalie Jameson	Liberal	Carolyn Simpson	29.15%
August 12	PE	Brackley-Hunter River	PC	Dennis King	PC	Kent Dollar	–12.18%
August 18	Fed.	Battle River—Crowfoot, AB	Conservative	Damien Kurek	Conservative	Pierre Poilievre	–5.90%
August 26	MB	Spruce Woods	PC	Grant Jackson	PC	Colleen Robbins	–18.32%
October 6	NB	Miramichi West	PC	Mike Dawson	PC	Kevin Russell	–2.50%
December 8	PE	Georgetown-Pownal	PC	Steven Myers	PC	Brendan Curran	–26.36%
December 15	NU	Aggu	—N/a	None (Note: Election resulted in a tie.)	Independent	Edward Attagutaluk	—N/a

=== Leadership contests ===
Contest held while party in government, contest winner to be first minister elect.

Date	Jurisdiction	Party	Status in Legislature	Previous permanent leader (leadership)	New leader(s)
February 4 (Note: co-leadership ratification vote)	Federal	Green	5th party, without status 3 / 338	Elizabeth May (2006–2019, since 2022)	Elizabeth May & Jonathan Pedneault
March 9	Federal	Liberal	Minority government 152 / 338	Justin Trudeau (2013–2025)	Mark Carney
April 26	MB	Progressive; Conservative	Official opposition 22 / 57	Heather Stefanson (2021–2024)	Obby Khan
May 3	NL	Liberal	Majority government 15 / 40	Andrew Furey (2020–2025)	John Hogan
June 7	PEI	Green	3rd party, with status 3 / 27	Peter Bevan-Baker (2012–2023)	Matt MacFarlane
June 14	QC	Liberal	Official opposition 19 / 125	Dominique Anglade (2020–2022)	Pablo Rodriguez
June 19	YT	Liberal	Minority government 8 / 21	Ranj Pillai (2023–2025)	Mike Pemberton
September 24	BC	Green	3rd party, with status 2 / 93	Sonia Furstenau (2020–2025)	Emily Lowan
October 4	PEI	Liberal	Official opposition 4 / 27	Sharon Cameron (2022–2023)	Robert Mitchell
October 25	MB	Liberal	3rd party, without status 1 / 57	Dougald Lamont (2017–2023)	Willard Reaves
November 8 (Note: Contest for male co-spokesperson only)	QC	Québec solidaire	3rd party, with status 12 / 125	Gabriel Nadeau-Dubois (2017–2025) (Note: as male co-spokesperson, serving with Ruba Ghazal elected in November 2024)	Sol Zanetti

== January to March ==
- January 5: Municipal by-election in District 2, Saint-Lucien, Quebec
- January 6: Ward 4, Hamilton-Wentworth District School Board by-election
- January 15: Municipal by-election in Ward 1, Rural Municipality of Lakeshore, Manitoba
- January 18: Municipal by-election in Zeballos, British Columbia
- January 19: Mayoral by-election in Otter Lake, Quebec
- January 21: Iskut Band Council by-election
- January 30: Mayoral by-election in Haines Junction, Yukon
- January 31: Wards 4 & 7; and 11 & 12 by-elections, Calgary Catholic School District
- February 3: Municipal by-election in St. Nicholas, Prince Edward Island
- February 4: 2025 Green Party of Canada co-leadership election
- February 9: Municipal by-election in District 4, Béthanie, Quebec
- February 16: Municipal by-election in District 3, Sainte-Clotilde; Districts 3, 5 & 6, Saint-Pierre-de-Lamy, Quebec
- February 22:
  - Peace River Regional District by-election
  - Coquitlam School District by-election
- February 23: Municipal by-election in District 6, Ayer's Cliff; District 2, Barraute; Districts 1, 3 and 5, Laforce; Mayor and districts 3, 5 & 6, Lingwick; Districts 1 & 3, Saint-Denis-De La Bouteillerie, Quebec
- February 24: Municipal by-election in Warren Grove, Prince Edward Island
- February 27: 2025 Ontario general election
- February 28:
  - Park West School Division Ward 6, Strathclair by-election
  - 2025 Ensemble Montréal leadership election
- March 1:
  - Municipal by-elections in Ladysmith and Barriere, British Columbia
  - Chilliwack School District by-election
- March 2: Municipal by-election in District 2, La Motte, Quebec
- March 3:
  - Ward 11 (Don Valley West) by-election, Toronto District School Board
  - Mayoral by-election in Alberton, Prince Edward Island
- March 8 Cariboo-Chilcotin School District by-election
- March 9: 2025 Liberal Party of Canada leadership election
- March 15: 2025 Projet Montréal leadership election
- March 17: 2025 Terrebonne provincial by-election, Quebec
- March 18: 2025 Transcona provincial by-election, Manitoba
- March 24: Municipal by-election in Hunter River, Prince Edward Island

== April to May ==
- April 5
  - Municipal by-elections in Penticton, Sun Peaks, Fruitvale, and Esquimalt.
  - 2025 Vancouver City Council by-election
  - West Vancouver School District by-election
- April 7: Municipal by-election in Morell, Prince Edward Island
- April 9: Lheidli T'enneh Band Chief and council election
- April 10:
  - Municipal by-election in Ward 5, Kawartha Lakes, Ontario
  - Municipal by-elections in Wards 1 and 4, Haldimand County, Ontario
- April 12:
  - Municipal by-election in North Cowichan and Tumbler Ridge, British Columbia
  - qathet School District by-election
- April 14:
  - Municipal by-election in Ward 6 - Port Dalhousie, St. Catharines, Ontario
  - New Brunswick municipal by-elections
  - Municipal by-election in North Rustico, Prince Edward Island
- April 17: Municipal by-election in St. Nicholas, Prince Edward Island
- April 26:
  - 2025 Progressive Conservative Party of Manitoba leadership election
  - Municipal by-election in Hope, British Columbia
- April 28: 2025 Canadian federal election
- May 4: Municipal by-election in Districts 5 and 6, Saint-Roch-de-Mékinac, Quebec
- May 5: Mayoral by-election in Kensington, Prince Edward Island
- May 10: Municipal by-election in Lillooet, British Columbia
- May 12: 2025 New Brunswick municipal elections
- May 15: Municipal by-election in Lac du Bonnet, Manitoba
- May 17: Takla Nation election
- May 21: Grunthal, Manitoba LUD by-election
- May 25: Mayoral by-election in Notre-Dame-du-Laus, Quebec
- May 26: Municipal by-elections in Kensington and Souris West, Prince Edward Island, and mayoral by-election in Mount Stewart, Prince Edward Island

== June to July ==
- June 1: Municipal by-election in Districts 2 and 5, Chazel, Quebec
- June 7:
  - 2025 Green Party of Prince Edward Island leadership election
  - Cariboo-Chilcotin School District by-election
- June 8: Eastern Townships School Board, Ward 3 trustee by-election
- June 9: Municipal by-elections in Hazelbrook and Mount Stewart, Prince Edward Island
- June 14: 2025 Quebec Liberal Party leadership election
- June 16:
  - Municipal by-election in Osgoode Ward, Ottawa, Ontario
  - Ward 10 Waywayseecappo by-election, Park West School Division
  - Municipal by-election in Crapaud, Prince Edward Island
- June 19: 2025 Yukon Liberal Party leadership election
- June 21: Municipal by-election in Lions Bay, British Columbia
- June 23: Provincial by-elections in Olds-Didsbury-Three Hills, Edmonton-Ellerslie, and Edmonton-Strathcona, Alberta
- June 26: Municipal by-election in Ward 3, Rideau Lakes, Ontario
- June 28: Municipal by-election in Ucluelet, British Columbia
- June 30: Vuntut Gwitchin First Nation by-election
- July 7: Municipal by-election in Brackley, Prince Edward Island
- July 12: Municipal by-election in Sooke, British Columbia
- July 17: 2025 Transition Montréal leadership election
- July 20: Municipal by-elections in District 2 and 4, Saint-Gabriel-de-Rimouski, Quebec

== August to September ==
- August 11: 2025 Arthabaska provincial by-election
- August 12:
  - 2025 Charlottetown-Hillsborough Park provincial by-election
  - 2025 Brackley-Hunter River provincial by-election
- August 16: Municipal election in Sandy Beach, Alberta
- August 18: 2025 Battle River—Crowfoot federal by-election
- August 23: Municipal by-election in Penticton, British Columbia
- August 26: 2025 Spruce Woods provincial by-election
- September 3: Municipal by-election in Warman, Saskatchewan
- September 8:
  - Mayoral by-election in Kingston, Prince Edward Island
  - Mayoral by-election in Brock, Ontario (cancelled; candidate elected by acclamation)
  - Lloydminster Roman Catholic Separate School Division No. 89 trustee by-election
- September 15: Municipal by-election in Victoria and North Shore, Prince Edward Island
- September 22: Municipal by-election in Ward 8, Hamilton, Ontario
- September 24: 2025 Green Party of British Columbia leadership election
- September 27: Municipal by-election in White Rock, British Columbia
- September 29:
  - Municipal by-election in Ward 25 Scarborough—Rouge Park, Toronto
  - Municipal by-election in Ward 7, Markham, Ontario
  - 2025 Manitoba Liberal Party leadership election

== October ==
- October 2: 2025 Newfoundland and Labrador municipal elections (excluding St. John's)
- October 4: 2025 Prince Edward Island Liberal Party leadership election
- October 6:
  - Municipal by-election in Ward 1, Milton, Ontario
  - 2025 Miramichi West provincial by-election
- October 8: St. John's, Newfoundland and Labrador municipal elections (postponed from October 2)
- October 11: Abbotsford School District by-election
- October 13: Mayoral and council by-election in Greenmount-Montrose, Prince Edward Island
- October 14: 2025 Newfoundland and Labrador general election
- October 18: Municipal by-election in Ashcroft, British Columbia
- October 20:
  - 2025 Alberta municipal elections
  - Municipal by-election in LaSalle, Ontario
- October 25:
  - Municipal by-election in Elmwood-East Kildonan Ward, Winnipeg, Manitoba.
  - School trustee by-elections in Ward 3, Louis Riel School Division and Ward 1, Pembina Trails School Division
  - Municipal by-election in Langley, British Columbia (district municipality)
- October 27:
  - 2025 Nunavut general election
  - Municipal by-election in Ward 2, Windsor, Ontario

== November to December ==
- November 2: 2025 Quebec municipal elections
- November 3:
  - 2025 Yukon electoral reform plebiscite
  - 2025 Yukon general election
- November 8:
  - 2025 Québec solidaire co-spokesperson election
  - Municipal by-election in Granisle, Salmo and Stewart, British Columbia
- November 17: School board elections in Yukon
- November 23: Municipal by-elections in seat 6, Fugèreville, seat 2, Grand-Métis, seat 5, Les Hauters, seat 3, Marston, mayor and seats 2 and 3, Saint-Donat, Bas-Saint-Laurent, seats 2 and 3, Saint-Edmond-les-Plaines, seats 3, 4 and 6, Saint-Édouard-de-Fabre, seat 4, Saint-Marc-de-Figuery, and mayor and seat 1, Saint-Philibert, Quebec (deferred from 2025 municipal elections)
- November 30: Mayoral by-election in Lac-Frontière (acclamation); municipal by-elections in seat 4, Saint-Antoine-de-l'Isle-aux-Grues, seats 1 and 3, Saint-Marcel, and seat 3, Saint-Romain, Quebec (deferred from 2025 municipal elections)
- December 7: Municipal by-elections in seat 2, Belcourt, seats 2, 6 and mayor of Landrienne, seat 1, Matapédia, seat 6, Saint-François-d'Assise, seat 5, Saint-Jean-Port-Joli, seat 2, Saint-Joseph-de-Lepage, seats 2 and 3, Saint-Léandre, and seat 2, Saint-Nérée-de-Bellechasse, Quebec (deferred from 2025 municipal elections)
- December 8: Provincial by-election in Georgetown-Pownal, Prince Edward Island
- December 14: Municipal by-elections in seat 3, Albertville, seat 4, Nédélec, seat 3 in Rémigny, mayor of Saint-Benjamin, seats 3 and 5, Saint-Clément, mayor and seat 4, Saint-Cyrille-de-Lessard, seat 5, Saint-Just-de-Bretenières, and seat 4, Stanstead-Est, Quebec (deferred from 2025 municipal elections)
- December 15: Territorial by-election in Aggu, Nunavut
- December 21: Municipal by-election in seat 6, Fugèreville, seat 1, La Doré, mayor and seat 3, Saint-Michel-du-Squatec, Quebec (deferred from 2025 municipal elections)

== See also ==
- Canadian provincial elections – each province and their expected next election date
