= 2018 New Democratic Party of Prince Edward Island leadership election =

- Date: April 7, 2018
- Convention: Charlottetown
- Resigning leader: Michael Redmond
- Won by: Joe Byrne
- Ballots: 1
- Candidates: 3

A Prince Edward Island New Democratic Party leadership convention was held on April 7, 2018, as a result of the resignation of Michael Redmond on December 6, 2017, after he placed fourth place in the Charlottetown-Parkdale by-election held on November 27, 2017.

Joe Byrne was elected party leader on the first ballot.

== Declared candidates ==
- Margaret Andrade, former NDP candidate in Leeds—Grenville—Thousand Islands and Rideau Lakes, Ontario during the 2015 federal election and former municipal councillor in Alberta.
- Joe Byrne, former NDP candidate in Charlottetown during the 2015 federal election
- Susan MacVittie, managing editor of an environmental magazine and former outreach organizer and scheduler for Courtenay-Alberni NDP MP Gord Johns in British Columbia.

== Results ==
- Joe Byrne – 123
- Margaret Andrade –
- Susan MacVittie

Total votes cast – 215

== See also ==
- New Democratic Party of Prince Edward Island leadership elections
- 2022 New Democratic Party of Prince Edward Island leadership election
