= 2022 Canadian electoral calendar =

2022 elections in Canada

This is a list of elections in Canada that were held in 2022. Included are municipal, provincial and federal elections, by-elections on any level, referendums and party leadership races at any level.

== Leadership elections ==
- February 4: 2022 British Columbia Liberal Party leadership election
- April 23: 2022 New Democratic Party of Prince Edward Island leadership election
- May 14: 2022 Maverick Party leadership election
- June 25: 2022 Nova Scotia New Democratic Party leadership election
- June 26: 2022 Saskatchewan New Democratic Party leadership election
- July 9: 2022 Nova Scotia Liberal Party leadership election
- August 6: 2022 New Brunswick Liberal Association leadership election
- September 10: 2022 Conservative Party of Canada leadership election
- October 6: 2022 United Conservative Party leadership election
- October 21: 2022 British Columbia New Democratic Party leadership election
- November 19:
  - Prince Edward Island Liberal Party leadership election
  - Green Party of Canada leadership election

== January–February ==
- January 10:
  - Municipal by-election in Blackfalds, Alberta
  - Splatsin First Nation General Election
- January 12: Gwa‘sala-‘Nakwaxda‘xw Nations election
- January 13: Coldwater Indian Band general election
- January 15: Prince George School District and Nanaimo Ladysmith School District by-elections
- January 24: Mayoral by-election in Richmond Hill, Ontario
- January 28: Webequie Chief election
- February 4: Douglas First Nation council election
- February 5: Municipal (councillor and mayoral) by-election in Wells, British Columbia
- February 6: Wuikinuxv Nation election
- February 7: Municipal by-elections in Ward 9, Cypress County, Alberta and Innisfree, Alberta.
- February 8: Territorial by-election in Tu Nedhé-Wiilideh, Northwest Territories
- February 11: Webequie council election
- February 15:
  - Provincial by-election in Athabasca, Saskatchewan
  - Simpcw First Nation council by-election
- February 23:
  - Tseshaht First Nation council by-election
  - Squiala First Nation election
- February 28: Municipal by-election in Nanton, Alberta

== March–June ==
- March 1: Birch Narrows Dene Nation election
- March 2: Akisq'nuk First Nation election
- March 3: Millbrook First Nation election
- March 7: Norway House Cree Nation chief and council election
- March 14:
  - Municipal by-election in Delburne, Alberta
  - Municipal by-election in Rockyford, Alberta
- March 15: Provincial by-election in Fort McMurray-Lac La Biche, Alberta
- March 19: Xaxli‘p Nation Election
- March 21: Gitxaala Nation Election
- March 22:
  - Provincial by-election in Fort Whyte, Manitoba
  - Municipal by-elections in Clyde and Forestburg, Alberta
  - Lhtako Dene Nation Election
- March 26: Shxwhá:y Village council election
- April 2: Tla'amin Nation by-election
- April 5: Municipal by-election in Labrador City, Newfoundland and Labrador
- April 9: Municipal by-election in Silverton, British Columbia
- April 10: Municipal by-election in Sainte-Brigitte-de-Laval, Quebec (mayor and council #4)
- April 11: Provincial by-election in Marie-Victorin, Quebec
- April 27: Métis Nation British Columbia by-election
- April 30:
  - Municipal by-election in Lytton, British Columbia
  - Provincial by-election in Vancouver-Quilchena, British Columbia
- May 8: Municipal by-election in District #14, Saguenay, Quebec
- May 15: Municipal by-election in Sainte-Brigitte-de-Laval, councillor #1.
- June 2: 2022 Ontario general election
- June 4:
  - Nanaimo Regional District Area C by-election (cancelled due to acclamation).
  - Municipal special election in District 2, Inverness County, Nova Scotia
- June 5: Municipal by-election in des Montagnes District, Shawinigan, Quebec
- June 7: Provincial by-election in Thompson, Manitoba
- June 8: Municipal by-election Wolseley (cancelled due to acclamation) and Assiniboia, Saskatchewan.
- June 11: Mushkegowuk Council by-Election, Chapleau Cree First Nation
- June 12: Municipal by-election in district #6 Beloeil, Quebec
- June 20: Provincial by-elections in Miramichi Bay-Neguac and Southwest Miramichi-Bay du Vin, New Brunswick
- June 30: Municipal by-election in Dawson City, Yukon

== July–September ==
- July 2: Municipal by-election in Division No. 1, District of Lakeland No. 521, Saskatchewan
- July 10: Municipal by-election in Otter Lake, Quebec for councillor #3.
- July 11: Municipal by-election in Clyde, Alberta (cancelled due to acclamation)
- July 12: Heiltsuk Nation Tribal Council election
- July 17: Municipal by-elections in District #2, Beauceville and in Baie-D'Urfé, Quebec.
- July 22: Municipal elections in Duttonar, Victoria Beach and Winnipeg Beach, Manitoba
- August 7: Municipal by-election in District #4, Notre-Dame-de-l'Île-Perrot, Quebec
- August 10: Chinook School Division, Saskatchewan by-election for Subdivision 1
- August 23: Municipal by-election in Viking, Alberta
- August 30: Municipal by-election in Bon Accord, Alberta
- September 3: Six Nations of the Grand River Elected Council by-election
- September 10: Provincial by-election in Surrey South, British Columbia
- September 13: Municipal by-election in Viking, Alberta (acclamation)
- September 22: Buffalo Trail Public Schools Regional Division No. 28 Ward 4, Subdivision 3 by-election
- September 26:
  - Provincial by-election in Saskatoon Meewasin, Saskatchewan
  - Municipal by-election in Hanna, Alberta (cancelled due to acclamation)

== October–December ==
- October 3: 2022 Quebec general election
- October 12: Municipal by-election in High Level, Alberta
- October 15: 2022 British Columbia municipal elections
- October 16: Municipal by-election in Boileau, Quebec
- October 17:
  - Municipal by-election in Grande Prairie, Alberta.
  - Municipal election in Yellowknife, Northwest Territories
  - Municipal by-election in Inuvik, Northwest Territories
- October 23: Municipal by-election in Parc-de-la-Montagne-Saint-Raymond District, Gatineau, Quebec
- October 24:
  - 2022 Ontario municipal elections
  - Municipal by-election in Legal, Alberta
- October 26: 2022 Manitoba municipal elections
- November 7: 2022 Prince Edward Island municipal elections
- November 8: Provincial by-election in Brooks-Medicine Hat, Alberta
- November 9: 2022 Saskatchewan municipal elections
- November 20: Mayoral by-election and Des Patriotes District by-election in Sorel-Tracy, Quebec
- November 21
  - Municipal by-election in Division 4, Lac Ste. Anne County, Alberta.
  - Municipal by-election in Fox Creek, Alberta (cancelled due to acclamation)
  - Municipal by-election in Rocky Mountain House, Alberta
- November 28: New Brunswick local government elections
- December 4: Municipal by-elections in Beauceville (District 3), Beloeil (District 6), Rouyn-Noranda (Université District, cancelled due to acclamation) and Sainte-Julienne, Quebec (mayor)
- December 9: Saugeen First Nation #29 By-election
- December 11: Municipal by-election in Belle-Rivière - Ringuet District, Sainte-Julie, Quebec
- December 12:
  - Northwest Territories municipal elections (hamlets)
  - 2022 Mississauga—Lakeshore federal by-election
- December 13: Provincial by-election in Kirkfield Park, Manitoba

== See also ==
- 2022 United Kingdom electoral calendar
