= List of shipwrecks in August 1837 =

The list of shipwrecks in August 1837 includes ships sunk, foundered, wrecked, grounded, or otherwise lost during August 1837.

== 1 August ==
List of shipwrecks: 1 August 1837
Ship	State	Description
Henry Kneeland	United Kingdom	The ship ran aground on Robbins Reef. She was on a voyage from Liverpool, Lancashire to New York, United States. Henry Kneeland was later refloated and taken into New York.
Jane	United Kingdom	The brig was driven ashore and wrecked near Freshwater, Isle of Wight. Her crew were rescued. She was on a voyage from British Honduras to London.
John	(United Kingdom of Great Britain and Ireland) Guernsey	The ship struck rocks at Havana, Cuba. She was later refloated, repaired, and resumed her voyage to Guernsey.

== 2 August ==
List of shipwrecks: 2 August 1837
Ship	State	Description
Alfred	France	The ship was sunk in a hurricane at Saint Kitts.
Anna Celestina	France	The ship was driven ashore and wrecked in a hurricane at Saint Thomas, Virgin Islands.
Bonne Mere	France	The ship was driven ashore in a hurricane at Saint Thomas.
Cordero	Flag unknown	The ship was driven ashore and wrecked in a hurricane at Saint Thomas.
Crocodile	(United Kingdom of Great Britain and Ireland) Dominica	The sloop was driven ashore and wrecked in a hurricane at Saint Kitts.
Eleanor	United Kingdom	The schooner was driven ashore in a hurricane at Saint Kitts.
Emelie Constance	France	The ship was driven ashore in a hurricane at Saint Thomas.
Gaiten or Griton	Flag unknown	The ship was driven ashore in a hurricane at Saint Thomas.
Gig	(United Kingdom of Great Britain and Ireland) Saint Kitts	The sloop was driven ashore and wrecked in a hurricane at Saint Kitts.
Hunter	(United Kingdom of Great Britain and Ireland) Saint Vincent	The ship was wrecked in a hurricane at Saint Vincent.
Jane	(United Kingdom of Great Britain and Ireland) British North America	The ship was driven ashore in a hurricane at Tortola.
Julius	United Kingdom	The full-rigged ship was wrecked in a hurricane at Saint Kitts.
Marblehead	United States	The ship was wrecked on the Little Bahama Bank. She was on a voyage from Matanzas, Cuba to Saint Petersburg, Russia.
Michael	United Kingdom	The full-rigged ship was driven ashore and wrecked in a hurricane at Saint Kitts with the loss of a crew member.
Montrose	United Kingdom	The barque driven ashore and was wrecked in a hurricane at Antigua. Her crew were rescued. She was on a voyage from Antigua to Liverpool, Lancashire.
Nord Risum	France	The ship was sunk in a hurricane at Saint Kitts.
Orana	Flag unknown	The ship was driven ashore in a hurricane at Saint Thomas.
San Narciso	Spain	The ship was driven ashore on the coast of Puerto Rico. She was on a voyage from La Guaira, Venezuela to Santander.
Susanna	United Kingdom	The ship was driven ashore in a hurricane at Saint Thomas.
Vigilant	United Kingdom	The ship was driven ashore in a hurricane at Saint Thomas.
William IV	(United Kingdom of Great Britain and Ireland) Barbados	The ship was wrecked on "Ramos Island".

== 3 August ==
List of shipwrecks: 3 August 1837
Ship	State	Description
Blucher	United Kingdom	The ship ran around on the Gunfleet Sand and consequently foundered in the North Sea off Walton-on-the-Naze, Essex. Her crew were rescued. She was on a voyage from Pillau, Prussia to London. She was later refloated and towed in to Harwich, Essex, arriving on 11 August.

== 4 August ==
List of shipwrecks: 4 August 1837
Ship	State	Description
William Waters	United Kingdom	The ship was driven ashore in the River Plate. She was on a voyage from Liverpool, Lancashire to Montevideo, Uruguay and Buenos Aires, Argentina. William Waters was later refloated and taken into Montevideo for repairs.

== 5 August ==
List of shipwrecks: 5 August 1837
Ship	State	Description
Elvira	United States	The brig was driven ashore at Pensacola, Florida Territory. She was consequently condemned.
Lion	United States	The brig was driven ashore at Pensacola. She was consequently condemned.
Providence	United States	The brig foundered in the Atlantic Ocean 25 nautical miles (46 km) east by north of the Tybee Island Lighthouse, Georgia.
Ridout	United States	The brig was driven ashore at Pensacola. She was consequently condemned.

== 6 August ==
List of shipwrecks: 6 August 1837
Ship	State	Description
Augusta	United States	The ship was abandoned in the Atlantic Ocean. She was on a voyage from Cádiz, Spain to Boston, Massachusetts.
Miranda	United States	The barque was lost in the Abaco Islands.

== 7 August ==
List of shipwrecks: 7 August 1837
Ship	State	Description
Anime del Purgatario	Grand Duchy of Tuscany	The ship was lost at the mouth of the Jiumicino River. She was on a voyage from Livorno to Rome, Papal States.
Mary and Betsey	United Kingdom	The ship sprang a leak and foundered off Penzance, Cornwall. Her crew were rescued. She was on a voyage from Neath, Glamorgan to Truro, Cornwall.

== 8 August ==
List of shipwrecks: 8 August 1837
Ship	State	Description
Quatre Frères	France	The ship struck rock near the Runnel Stone and foundered. Her crew were rescued. She was on a voyage from Rouen, Seine-Inférieure to Newport, Monmouthshire, United Kingdom.
Two Brothers	United Kingdom	The ship was holed by an anchor and sank at Newcastle upon Tyne, Northumberland. She was on a voyage from Great Yarmouth, Norfolk to Newcastle upon Tyne.
Wolf	United Kingdom	The whaler was wrecked on a reef off Lord Howe's Island. Her crew survived; they were later rescued by Psyche (United Kingdom).

== 9 August ==
List of shipwrecks: 9 August 1837
Ship	State	Description
Fairfield	United Kingdom	The ship was driven ashore at the mouth of the Saint Charles River. She was refloated on 11 August.

== 10 August ==
List of shipwrecks: 10 August 1837
Ship	State	Description
Adrian	United States	The schooner was lost on St. John's Island. Crew saved.
General Treupo	France	The ship was driven ashore and wrecked at Atherfield, Isle of Wight, United Kingdom. She was on a voyage from Marseille, Bouches-du-Rhône to Saint Petersburg, Russia.

== 11 August ==
List of shipwrecks: 11 August 1837
Ship	State	Description
Ann	United States	The ship was driven ashore in a hurricane at Jacksonville, Florida Territory.
Bolivar	United States	The ship was driven ashore in a hurricane at Jacksonville.
Favourite	United States	The ship sank in a hurricane at Jacksonville.
Forester	United States	The ship was driven ashore in a hurricane at Jacksonville.
George and Mary	United States	The ship was lost in a hurricane at Jacksonville. Her crew were rescued.
Virginia	United States	The ship was driven ashore in a hurricane at Jacksonville.

== 12 August ==
List of shipwrecks: 12 August 1837
Ship	State	Description
Diana	United Kingdom	The ship was driven ashore near Peterhead, Aberdeenshire. She was on a voyage from Aberdeen to the River Spey.

== 14 August ==
List of shipwrecks: 14 August 1837
Ship	State	Description
Duke of York	United Kingdom	The whaler, a three-masted barque, was wrecked north of Moreton Bay. Two of her twelve crew were killed by the local inhabitants.

== 15 August ==
List of shipwrecks: 15 August 1837
Ship	State	Description
America	United States	The schooner was struck by lightning and set afire in a hurricane at Savannah, Georgia.
Edmund Castle	United Kingdom	The ship was driven ashore at St. Nicholas, Prince Edward Island, British North America. She was later refloated and taken into Quebec City, Lower Canada for repairs.

== 16 August ==
List of shipwrecks: 16 August 1837
Ship	State	Description
Medway	United Kingdom	The paddle steamer caught fire and sank in the River Thames opposite Northfleet, Kent with the loss of two lives. She was on a voyage from London Bridge to Gravesend, Kent.

== 17 August ==
List of shipwrecks: 17 August 1837
Ship	State	Description
Fly	United Kingdom	The sloop was wrecked at Sumburgh Head, Shetland Islands. She was on a voyage from Peterhead, Aberdeenshire to Scalloway, Shetland Islands.
Two Brothers	United Kingdom	The ship was holed by an anchor and sank in the River Tyne. She was on a voyage from Newcastle upon Tyne, Northumberland to Great Yarmouth, Norfolk.

== 18 August ==
List of shipwrecks: 18 August 1837
Ship	State	Description
Rosebud	United Kingdom	The ship capsized in the Atlantic Ocean with the loss of two of her crew. Survivors were rescued by General Sumter (United States). Rosebud was on a voyage from Havana, Cuba to London. The wreck was discovered on 23 August by Emerald (United Kingdom). After her cargo was salvaged, she was set afire the next day.

== 19 August ==
List of shipwrecks: 19 August 1837
Ship	State	Description
Dingwall	United Kingdom	The ship was wrecked at Cape Spear, Newfoundland, British North America. Her crew were rescued. She was on a voyage from Saint John's, Newfoundland to Saint Andrews, New Brunswick, British North America.
Harmonie	United States	The ship was driven ashore 50 nautical miles (93 km) south of the Delaware Capes. She was on a voyage from New York to Alexandria, Egypt.
Margaret	United Kingdom	The ship was driven ashore and wrecked at Courtown, County Wexford. She was on a voyage from Miramichi, New Brunswick to Liverpool, Lancashire.

== 20 August ==
List of shipwrecks: 20 August 1837
Ship	State	Description
Brilliant	United Kingdom	The ship was abandoned in the Atlantic Ocean. She was on a voyage from Newport, Monmouthshire to Quebec City, Lower Canada, British North America. Brilliant was subsequently driven ashore at "Moher".
Ferjen	United Kingdom	The ship was wrecked in Algoa Bay. She was on a voyage from Liverpool, Lancashire to the Cape of Good Hope and Manila, Spanish East Indies.
Fanny	United Kingdom	The ship was destroyed by fire in the North Sea off Filey, Yorkshire.
Fanny	United Kingdom	The ship caught fire and was abandoned off Scarborough, Yorkshire. She was on a voyage from London to Stockton-on-Tees, County Durham.
Feejee	United Kingdom	The ship was wrecked in Algoa Bay. Her crew were rescued. She was on a voyage from Liverpool, Lancashire to the Cape of Good Hope and Manila, Spanish East Indies.
Forentanguet	Portugal	The ship was driven ashore at Lewiston, Maine, United States. She was on a voyage from Philadelphia, Pennsylvania, United States to St. Ubes.
Maria	United Kingdom	The ship capsized and sank in the Atlantic Ocean with the loss of a crew member. Survivors were rescued by Hogarth (United Kingdom). She was on a voyage from British Honduras to London.
Splendid	United Kingdom	The steamship ran aground and was wrecked at Sunderland, County Durham. All on board, over 80 people, were rescued. She was on a voyage from Newcastle upon Tyne, Northumberland to Sunderland.
Success	United Kingdom	The ship was driven ashore and wrecked near Krantz, Prussia with the loss of three of her crew. She was on a voyage from Pillau, Prussia to London.
Vesta	United Kingdom	The paddle steamer was severely damaged on the Newbiggin Rocks. All on board survived She was on a voyage from Leith, Lothian to Blyth, Northumberland. She was refloated on 14 September, repaired and returned to service.

== 21 August ==
List of shipwrecks: 21 August 1837
Ship	State	Description
Harriet	United Kingdom	The ship was driven ashore near Courtown, County Wexford. She was on a voyage from Liverpool, Lancashire to New York, United States.
John	United Kingdom	The ship was driven ashore at Irvine, Ayrshire. She was on a voyage from Belfast, County Antrim to Irvine.
Petite Village	France	The lugger was driven ashore at Bon Point, Cornwall, United Kingdom. She was later refloated.

== 22 August ==
List of shipwrecks: 22 August 1837
Ship	State	Description
Diligence	Netherlands	The ship caught fire, exploded and sank at "Passaroeng", Netherlands East Indies. Her crew were rescued.
Ida	United Kingdom	The ship was abandoned in the Atlantic Ocean. Her crew survived. She was on a voyage from Jamaica to London. Ida was discovered by Sorrow (United Kingdom), which put a skeleton crew on board. She was taken in to Sandy Hook, New Jersey, United States, where she arrived on 12 September.
William and Frances	United States	The ship was driven ashore at Hurst Castle, Hampshire, United Kingdom. She was on a voyage from Boston, Massachusetts to Hull, Yorkshire. William and Frances was later refloated.

== 23 August ==
List of shipwrecks: 23 August 1837
Ship	State	Description
Giuseppe	Malta	The brig was sunk at East Greenwich, Kent by the explosion of a skiff laden with gunpowder alongside her. One person on board the skiff was killed. A crew member was killed and four people were severely injured on board Giuseppe.
Mallard	United Kingdom	The brig foundered in the English Channel off Fairlight, Sussex. Her crew were rescued. She was on a voyage from Swansea, Glamorgan to Great Yarmouth, Norfolk.
Niord	Sweden	The ship was lost near Råbjerg with the loss of four of her crew. She was on a voyage from St. Ubes, Portugal to Fredrikshavn, Denmark.

== 24 August ==
List of shipwrecks: 24 August 1837
Ship	State	Description
Friends	United Kingdom	The ship ran aground at King's Lynn, Norfolk. She was on a voyage from South Shields, County Durham to King's Lynn.
Highland Chief	United Kingdom	The ship was lost at Saugor, India. Her crew were rescued. She was on a voyage from Calcutta, India to Penang, Straits Settlements.
Spartan	United Kingdom	The ship capsized at Cork and was severely damaged. She was on a voyage from Civitavecchia, Papal States to Cork.

== 25 August ==
List of shipwrecks: 25 August 1837
Ship	State	Description
Bridport	United Kingdom	The ship sprang a leak and foundered off Bornholm, Denmark. She was on a voyage from Portrush, County Antrim to Memel, Prussia.
Concord	United Kingdom	The ship was abandoned in the Baltic Sea off Gotland, Sweden.
Luckless or Success	Prussia	The ship was driven ashore and wrecked near "Crantz" with the loss of three of her crew. She was on a voyage from Pillau to London, United Kingdom.
Zee Vogel	Prussia	The ship was driven ashore at Pillau. Her crew were rescued. She was on a voyage from Newcastle upon Tyne, Northumberland, United Kingdom to Pillau.

== 26 August ==
List of shipwrecks: 26 August 1837
Ship	State	Description
Alan	United Kingdom	The ship struck the Stag Rock, off The Lizard, Cornwall and sank. Her crew were rescued. She was on a voyage from Swansea, Glamorgan to Truro, Cornwall.
Antelope	(United Kingdom of Great Britain and Ireland) Cape Colony	The schooner was driven ashore and wrecked in Table Bay. Hercrew survived.
Bounty	United Kingdom	The ship struck the Herd Sand and was consequently beached at South Shields, County Durham, where she was wrecked. Her crew were rescued by the South Shields Lifeboat.
George	France	The ship was driven ashore at "Russen". She was on a voyage from Härnösand to Bordeaux, Gironde.
Charles Adams	United States	The ship was destroyed by fire in the Atlantic Ocean. Her crew were rescued.
Ranger	United Kingdom	The ship was driven ashore and wrecked near the mouth of the Salt River, Cape Colony. Her crew survived. She was subsequently condemned.
Simeon	Prussia	The ship was driven ashore at Pillau. She was refloated the next day but again driven ashore and was abandoned by her crew. Simeon was subsequently destroyed by fire.

== 27 August ==
List of shipwrecks: 27 August 1837
Ship	State	Description
Invincible	Texas Navy	Invincible. Battle of Galveston Harbor: The 8-gun schooner ran aground and was wrecked at Galveston whilst being pursued by Libertador and Vencedor del Álamo (both Mexican Navy).
Mentor	United Kingdom	The ship ran aground on the Herd Sand, in the North Sea off the coast of County Durham. She was refloated on 31 August and taken into South Shields.
Ohio	United States	The ship was driven ashore and destroyed by fire in the Delaware River. She was on a voyage from Philadelphia, Pennsylvania to Bordeaux, Gironde, France.
Solebay or Solway	United Kingdom	The ship was wrecked on the coast of Lincolnshire. Her crew were rescued by Mary (United Kingdom).

== 28 August ==
List of shipwrecks: 28 August 1837
Ship	State	Description
Cambria	United Kingdom	The ship sprang a leak and foundered in the Baltic Sea off Liebau, Prussia. Her crew were rescued. She was on a voyage from Ipswich, Suffolk to Riga, Russia.
Deux Adèles	Haiti	The ship ran aground at Jacmel, Haiti. She was on a voyage from Jacmel to New York, United States. Deux Adèles was refloated but consequently condemned. Later repaired and returned to service as Union.
Mars	Denmark	The ship was driven ashore near Stralsund. She was on a voyage from Nysted to Greifswald.
Marshall	United Kingdom	The ship was driven ashore near "Roserhead". She was on a voyage from Danzig to London. Marshall was refloated on 4 September and put back to Danzig.

== 29 August ==
List of shipwrecks: 29 August 1837
Ship	State	Description
Minerva	United Kingdom	The ship ran aground on Gotland, Sweden and capsized. Her crew were rescued. She was on a voyage from Saint Petersburg, Russia to Ipswich, Suffolk. Minerva subsequently floated off of her side and drifted out to sea.
Sprightly	United Kingdom	The brig foundered in the North Sea off Flamborough Head, Yorkshire with the loss of five of her six crew. She was on a voyage from Newcastle upon Tyne, Northumberland to London.

== 30 August ==
List of shipwrecks: 30 August 1837
Ship	State	Description
Atlas	United Kingdom	The ship sank near "Coisée", France. She was on a voyage from London to Nantes, Loire-Inférieure, France.
St. Ives	United Kingdom	The ship struck The Manacles and foundered. Her crew were rescued.
Tam O'Shanter	United Kingdom	The barque was wrecked on the north coast of Van Diemen's Land, 16 nautical miles (30 km) east of the mouth of the Tamar River. She was on a voyage from South Australia to Sydney.

== 31 August ==
List of shipwrecks: 31 August 1837
Ship	State	Description
Equity	United Kingdom	The ship was wrecked near Stornoway, Isle of Lewis, Outer Hebrides. Her crew were rescued. She was on a voyage from Arkhangelsk, Russia to Bristol, Gloucestershire.
William	United Kingdom	The ship was driven ashore at "Kallebotstrand", in Kioge Bay. She was on a voyage from Saint Petersburg, Russia to Gloucester. William was later refloated and taken in to Copenhagen, Denmark for repairs. She arrived on 3 September.

== Unknown date ==
List of shipwrecks: Unknown date in August 1837
Ship	State	Description
Aguila	Spain	The ship was wrecked on the Bahamas Bank. She was on a voyage from Havana, Cuba to Newfoundland, British North America.
Angelique	France	The ship was in collision with another vessel and foundered. Her crew were rescued. She was on a voyage from Middlesbrough, Yorkshire, United Kingdom to Bordeaux, Gironde.
Andes	United States	The ship foundered in the Atlantic Ocean. Her crew were rescued. She was on a voyage from the Turks Islands to Bath, Maine.
Charles	United Kingdom	The ship was driven ashore in a hurricane and wrecked on Catalina Island, Haiti. Her crew were rescued.
Edouard	France	The ship was wrecked in a hurricane at Saint Domingo with the loss of three of her crew.
Felicity	United Kingdom	The ship was wrecked in the Bahamas. She was on a voyage from Antigua to Halifax, Nova Scotia, British North America.
Godt	Norway	The ship was abandoned in the North Sea. She was on a voyage from Bergen to Amsterdam, North Holland, Netherlands. She was towed into Heligoland in a wrecked condition.
Harriet	United Kingdom	The whaler was wrecked at Providence, Fiji Islands. Several of her crew were murdered by the local inhabitants.
Heraclidæ	Bremen	The ship was wrecked in the Bahamas before 22 August. She was on a voyage from New Orleans, Louisiana, United States to Bremen.
Jane	United Kingdom	The ship was driven ashore near Aberystwyth, Cardiganshire.
Janus	United Kingdom	The barque was abandoned in the Atlantic Ocean on or before 11 August.
Margaret Gardner	United Kingdom	The ship was abandoned in the Atlantic Ocean on or before 19 August.
Mariners	Spain	The ship was wrecked on the Bahamas Bank. She was on a voyage from Havana to Cádiz.
Mary	United Kingdom	The ship was wrecked at St Govan's Head, Pembrokeshire. Her crew were rescued.
Norval	United Kingdom	The ship was abandoned in the Atlantic Ocean. Her crew survived. She was on a voyage from Jamaica to Cork.
Perlen	United Kingdom	The ship was abandoned in the North Sea. She was on a voyage from Bergen to Messina, Sicily.
Stenervens	Norway	The ship was wrecked at Le Conquet, Finistère, France. She was on a voyage from La Rochelle, Charente-Maritime, France to a Norwegian port.
Stratfieldsay	United Kingdom	The ship was driven ashore at South Foreland, Kent. She was on a voyage from London to Sydney, New South Wales. Stratfieldsay was later refloated and resumed her voyage.
