= 2025 Green Party leadership election =

Green Party leadership elections took place, or will be taking place, in the following countries or regions in 2025:

- 2025 Green Party of Canada co-leadership election
  - 2025 Green Party of British Columbia leadership election in Canada
  - 2025 Green Party of Prince Edward Island leadership election in Canada
- 2025 Scottish Greens co-leadership election in Scotland
- 2025 Green Party of England and Wales leadership election in England and Wales
