= Sean Casey (Canadian politician) =

Canadian politician

Sean Casey MP KC
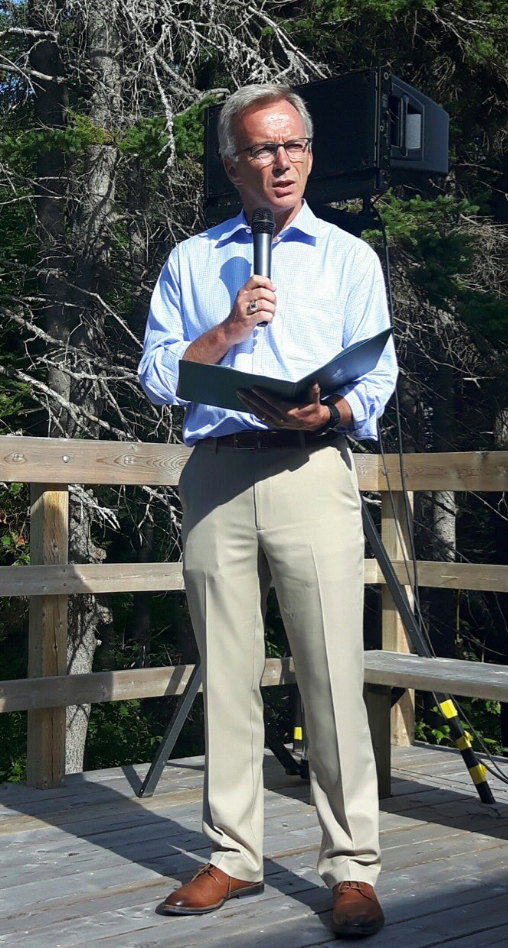
- Casey in 2017

Parliamentary Secretary to the Minister of Veterans Affairs and Associate Minister of National Defence
- In office June 5, 2025 – September 25, 2026
- Preceded by: Randeep Sarai
- Succeeded by: Sophie Chatel

Parliamentary Secretary to the Minister of Canadian Heritage
- In office January 30, 2017 – August 30, 2018
- Minister: Mélanie Joly
- Preceded by: Randy Boissonnault

Parliamentary Secretary to the Minister of Justice
- In office December 2, 2015 – January 27, 2017
- Minister: Jody Wilson-Raybould
- Preceded by: Bob Dechert; Robert Goguen
- Succeeded by: Marco Mendicino

Member of Parliament for Charlottetown
- Incumbent
- Assumed office May 2, 2011
- Preceded by: Shawn Murphy

Personal details
- Born: May 16, 1963 (age 63) St. John's, Newfoundland and Labrador, Canada
- Party: Liberal
- Education: St. Francis Xavier University; Dalhousie University
- Profession: Attorney

Sean J. Casey MP KC (born May 16, 1963) is a Canadian politician from Prince Edward Island, Canada. Casey was elected to the House of Commons of Canada in the 2011 federal election as the Liberal Member of Parliament for the riding of Charlottetown. Casey previously served as the president of the Prince Edward Island Liberal Party.

== Early career ==
Casey was born in St. John's, Newfoundland and educated at St. Francis Xavier University and Dalhousie Law School. He joined the firm Stewart McKelvey in 1989 (which also included Shawn Murphy, the man he would subsequently replace as MP for Charlottetown), and was made a partner in 1993. From 2003 to 2008 he was president of the Paderno Group of Companies, before returning to Stewart McKelvey as the firm's managing partner, until his resignation to run for office in 2011. From 2009 to 2010, he served as the president of the Greater Charlottetown Area Chamber of Commerce. He was also active as a volunteer in both soccer and minor hockey.

== Politics ==
Casey's first prominent role in politics came when he served as President of the PEI Liberal Party from 2003 to 2007. He did not reoffer as president after completing his term in 2007, after the party's victory in the 2007 election, stating that with their forming the government after nearly eleven years in opposition, he had accomplished what he had set out to.

When four-term incumbent Shawn Murphy announced his intention not to run in the 2011 Canadian federal election, Casey announced his intent to seek candidacy in the Charlottetown riding. He was unopposed for the nomination, and won the general election with nearly 40% of the vote. Casey was one of only two new Liberal MPs elected in the 2011 election (the other being Ted Hsu in Kingston and the Islands).

Casey served as the Liberal Party's Justice critic during the 41st Parliament. He was reelected to a second term in the 2015 election.

He was re-elected in 2015, 2019 and 2021. In Parliament, Sean has served as the Parliamentary Secretary to the Minister of Fisheries, Oceans, and the Canadian Coast Guard. He has also previously served as the Parliamentary Secretary to the Minister of Justice and Attorney General of Canada, as well as the Parliamentary Secretary to the Minister of Canadian Heritage as well as Chair of the Atlantic Liberal Caucus.

Casey was a candidate for Speaker of the House of Commons in 2023 but lost to Greg Fergus. He lost a second bid for the role to Francis Scarpaleggia in 2025.

He is currently the Chair of the Standing Committee on Human Resources, Skills and Social Development and the Status of Persons with Disabilities and a member of the Standing Committee on Veterans Affairs.

In October 2024, Casey publicly called for Justin Trudeau's resignation as Prime Minister. In the 2025 Liberal Party of Canada leadership election he endorsed Mark Carney.

On September 25, 2026, Casey was removed from his position as Parliamentary Secretary to the Minister of Veterans affairs after voting for a NDP private members bill limiting arms exports to Israel.

== Electoral record ==
2025 Canadian federal election: Charlottetown
Party	Candidate	Votes	%	±%	Expenditures
Liberal	Sean Casey	13,656	64.75	+18.05	$102,175.93
Conservative	Natalie Jameson	6,139	29.11	−1.95	$103,634.18
New Democratic	Joe Byrne	906	4.30	−6.42	$9,651.86
Green	Daniel Cousins	257	1.22	−8.37	$0.00
People's	Robert Lucas	131	0.62	−1.31	$1,794.70
Total valid votes/expense limit		21,089	99.00	+0.03	$106,504.98
Total rejected ballots		214	1.00	–0.03	
Turnout		21,303	76.59	+6.12	
Eligible voters		27,814			
Liberal notional hold		Swing		+10.00	
Source: Elections Canada
Note: number of eligible voters does not include voting day registrations.

2021 Canadian federal election: Charlottetown
Party	Candidate	Votes	%	±%	Expenditures
Liberal	Sean Casey	8,919	46.70	+2.44	$72,839.73
Conservative	Doug Currie	5,932	31.06	+10.77	$77,864.04
New Democratic	Margaret Andrade	2,048	10.72	-0.52	$3,242.50
Green	Darcie Lanthier	1,832	9.59	-13.75	none listed
People's	Scott McPhee	369	1.93	–	$0.00
Total valid votes/expense limit		19,100	98.97		$88,991.90
Total rejected ballots		198	1.03	-0.33	
Turnout		19,298	70.47	-2.34	
Eligible voters		27,383			
Liberal hold		Swing		-4.16	
Source: Elections Canada

2019 Canadian federal election: Charlottetown
Party	Candidate	Votes	%	±%	Expenditures
Liberal	Sean Casey	8,812	44.26	−12.01	$81,859.21
Green	Darcie Lanthier	4,648	23.35	+17.57	$36,415.23
Conservative	Robert A. Campbell	4,040	20.29	+5.47	$46,459.01
New Democratic	Joe Byrne	2,238	11.24	−11.90	$4,819.38
Christian Heritage	Fred MacLeod	172	0.86	New	$1,200.90
Total valid votes/expense limit		19,910	100.0		$86,542.92
Total rejected ballots		274	1.36	+0.89	
Turnout		20,184	73.45	−2.14	
Eligible voters		27,480			
Liberal hold		Swing		−14.79	
Source: Elections Canada

2015 Canadian federal election: Charlottetown
Party	Candidate	Votes	%	±%	Expenditures
Liberal	Sean Casey	11,910	56.27	+16.79	$133,567.53
New Democratic	Joe Byrne	4,897	23.14	–1.94	$51,147.58
Conservative	Ron MacMillan	3,136	14.82	–17.89	$73,560.00
Green	Becka Viau	1,222	5.77	+3.51	$5,912.52
Total valid votes/expense limit		21,165	99.53		$170,107.74
Total rejected ballots		99	0.47	–0.14	
Turnout		21,264	76.24	+6.14	
Eligible voters		27,891			
Liberal hold		Swing		+9.36	
Source: Elections Canada

2011 Canadian federal election: Charlottetown
Party	Candidate	Votes	%	±%	Expenditures
Liberal	Sean Casey	7,292	39.48	-10.58	$61,465.09
Conservative	Donna Profit	6,040	32.71	+0.60	$48,556.35
New Democratic	Joe Byrne	4,632	25.08	+12.77	$45,026.11
Green	Eliza Knockwood	417	2.26	-2.57	$2,301.92
Christian Heritage	Baird Judson	87	0.47	-0.23	$3,159.86
Total valid votes/expense limit		18,468	100.0	–	$69,664.10
Total rejected ballots		113	0.61	-0.16	
Turnout		18,581	70.10	+3.96	
Eligible voters		26,507			
Liberal hold		Swing		-5.59	
