= Thomas McMillan (Canadian politician) =

Canadian politician

The Honourable Tom McMillan PC

Minister of the Environment
- In office August 20, 1985 – December 7, 1988
- Prime Minister: Brian Mulroney
- Preceded by: Suzanne Blais-Grenier
- Succeeded by: Lucien Bouchard

Member of Parliament for Hillsborough
- In office May 22, 1979 – November 20, 1988
- Preceded by: Heath Macquarrie
- Succeeded by: George Proud

Personal details
- Born: October 15, 1945 (age 80) Charlottetown, Prince Edward Island, Canada
- Party: Progressive Conservative
- Profession: Political scientist

Thomas Michael McMillan, PC (born October 15, 1945) is a Canadian political scientist and former politician who served as Minister of the Environment from 1985 to 1988. A member of the Progressive Conservative Party of Canada, he was the Member of Parliament (MP) for Hillsborough from 1979 until 1988. McMillan is a graduate of St. Dunstan's University (now part of the University of Prince Edward Island) and Queen's University, where he earned a master's in political studies.

== Biography ==
McMillan was born in Charlottetown, Prince Edward Island.

Prior to entering electoral politics, in the late 1970s, McMillan was, successively, policy secretary to Robert Stanfield, Leader of the Official Opposition in the Canadian House of Commons; an executive officer of the Ontario Human Rights Commission; and Senior Research Associate of the national Commission on Canadian Studies, established by the Association of Universities and Colleges of Canada (AUCC).

McMillan was first elected to the House of Commons of Canada in the 1979 general election as the Progressive Conservative Member of Parliament for Hillsborough, Prince Edward Island. He was re-elected in the 1980 and 1984 elections. He served as Deputy House Leader from 1983 to 1984 under Leader of the Opposition Brian Mulroney.

He became increasingly active in such preservation causes in Prince Edward Island. These included the restoration of a unique pre-Confederation brick powder magazine—located in Brighton Compound in Charlottetown—the demolition of which the Canadian Army had begun until McMillan led a public campaign to stop it.

Following the Tory landslide in the 1984 general election, Mulroney appointed McMillan to Cabinet as Minister of State for tourism.

=== Environment minister ===
In 1985, McMillan was named Minister of the Environment, replacing the controversial Suzanne Blais-Grenier.

As Environment minister, McMillan spearheaded the Mulroney government's creation of five new national parks (Ellesmere Island, Pacific Rim, Bruce Peninsula, Gwaii Haanas, and Grasslands); ushered the Canadian Environmental Protection Act, (CEPA) through parliament; overhauled the Canadian National Parks Act; launched a major national program to combat acid rain from all sources (both industry and transportation); slashed allowable motor-vehicle nitrogen oxide exhaust emission levels in Canada; outlawed lead in motor vehicle gasoline; assembled, and then chaired, in 1987, the world conference that produced the milestone Montreal Protocol on Substances that Deplete the Ozone Layer, described by then-United Nations Secretary-General Kofi Annan as "perhaps the single most successful international agreement to date." He also hosted the landmark 1988 World Climate Change Conference, in Toronto.

In the spring of 1988, McMillan was Graves Lecturer and Hoyt Fellow at Yale University, New Haven, Connecticut.

=== Out of office ===
McMillan remained Environment minister until he was defeated in the 1988 general election due to opposition to the Canada–United States Free Trade Agreement among his constituents. In August 1989, McMillan was appointed Canada's consul-general to Boston.

=== Recognition ===
For McMillan's national and global environmental leadership, he was named by Outdoor Canada magazine, in 1990, one of three people who, in the previous decade, "did the most to protect Canada's natural environment;" the U.S. Sierra Club bestowed on him, in 1988, its prestigious Edgar Wayburn Award; he received, also in 1988, the Canadian Governor General's Conservation Award; and, in 1992, he was awarded the Governor General's Canada Medal for "distinguished service to Canada."

In the autumn of 1990, McMillan was Distinguished Lecturer, Distinguished Lecturer Series, International Institute for Protected Areas Management, at the Universities of both Alberta and Calgary. In June 2019, at its annual Gala Awards Dinner, Corporate Knights ("The Company for Clean Capitalism," which represents Fortune 500-type companies committed to sustainable development) bestowed on McMillan its Award of Distinction for his pivotal role in the Montreal Protocol.

McMillan was awarded an honorary doctorate by Bridgewater State University in 1993 for—in the words of its president, Dr. Adrian Tinsley -- "significant accomplishment on behalf of Canada in support of strong, enduring Canadian-American cooperation and ties."

After leaving the Environment portfolio, he remained active in international, national, and local issues alike, including built heritage preservation.

=== Later political career ===
He maintained his involvement in politics, and attempted unsuccessfully to regain his seat in the 1993 general election. At the urging of the new Progressive Conservative Party leader, Jean Charest, a close friend and former Mulroney government Cabinet colleague, McMillan reluctantly attempted another comeback, this time in the 1997 general election, in the riding of Peterborough, Ontario, but was defeated by Liberal candidate Peter Adams and by the Reform Party's Nancy Branscombe.

=== Writing ===
Among private sector and community services, McMillan has been chairman of the Book and Periodical Development Council of Canada and headed the Canadian Chamber of Commerce Task Force on the Environment and Economy.

McMillan wrote a bestselling book (Maclean's magazine list for several weeks), part memoir and part political analysis, entitled Not My Party: The Rise and Fall of Canadian Tories from Robert Stanfield to Stephen Harper, published by Nimbus Publishing in 2016.

== Archives ==
There is a Tom McMillan fonds at Library and Archives Canada.

== Electoral record ==
1997 Canadian federal election: Peterborough
Party	Candidate	Votes	%	±%
Liberal	Peter Adams	25,594	46.5	-1.0
Reform	Nancy Branscombe	15,759	28.7	+5.4
Progressive Conservative	Tom Macmillan	8,757	15.9	-4.1
New Democratic	Fred Birket	4,874	8.9	+3.6
Total valid votes		54,984	100.0	

1993 Canadian federal election: Hillsborough
Party	Candidate	Votes	%	±%
Liberal	George Proud	11,976	60.57	
Progressive Conservative	Thomas McMillan	5,269	26.65	
New Democratic	Dody Crane	1,143	5.78	
Reform	Freeman T. Whitty	744	3.76	
National	Dave Patterson	350	1.77	
Christian Heritage	Baird Judson	167	0.84	
Natural Law	Peter Cameron	123	0.62	

1988 Canadian federal election: Hillsborough
Party	Candidate	Votes	%	±%
Liberal	George Proud	8,897	43.68	
Progressive Conservative	Thomas McMillan	8,638	42.41	
New Democratic	Dody Crane	1,984	5.78	
Independent	David Weale	569	2.79	
Christian Heritage	Baird Judson	281	1.38	

1984 Canadian federal election: Hillsborough
Party	Candidate	Votes	%	±%
Progressive Conservative	Thomas McMillan	9,158	53.20	
Liberal	Gerry Birt	6,768	39.32	
New Democratic	David Burke	846	4.91	
Independent	Big John Muise	323	1.88	
Independent	Izzurd Goat McFadden	82	0.48	
Green	David Daughton	37	0.21	

1980 Canadian federal election: Hillsborough
Party	Candidate	Votes	%
Progressive Conservative	Thomas McMillan	7,128	47.66
Liberal	Gerry Birt	6,555	43.83
New Democratic	Bob Crockett	1,245	8.32
Marxist–Leninist	Kathryn Schmidt	28	0.19
lop.parl.ca

1979 Canadian federal election: Hillsborough
Party	Candidate	Votes	%	±%
Progressive Conservative	Thomas McMillan	8,338	54.99	
Liberal	Gordon Tweedy	5,319	35.08	
New Democratic	Bob Crockett	1,453	9.58	
Libertarian	Garry Anstett	54	0.36	
