= Hannah Bell =

Canadian politician (born 1969)

Hannah E. Bell
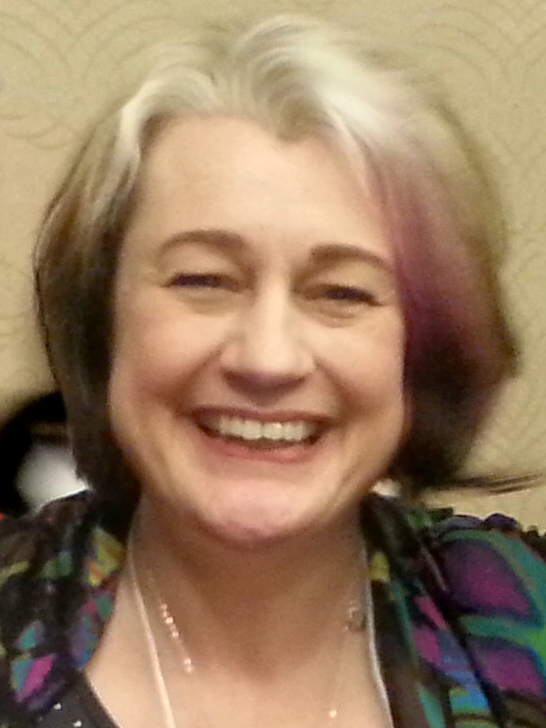

Member of the Legislative Assembly of Prince Edward Island for Charlottetown-Parkdale
- In office 13 December 2017 – 26 March 2019
- Preceded by: Doug Currie
- Succeeded by: Riding dissolved

Member of the Legislative Assembly of Prince Edward Island for Charlottetown-Belvedere
- In office 23 April 2019 – 6 March 2023
- Preceded by: Riding established
- Succeeded by: Susie Dillon

Personal details
- Born: August 9, 1969 (age 56) Farnborough, England
- Party: Green

Hannah Bell (born 9 August 1969) is a Canadian politician who served as a member of the Legislative Assembly of Prince Edward Island from 2017 to 2023. She represented the electoral district of Charlottetown-Belvedere as a member of the Green Party of Prince Edward Island. She was an unsuccessful candidate in the 2025 Green Party of Prince Edward Island leadership election.

== Biography ==
Bell was born on 9 August 1969. She has a Master of Business Administration in Innovative Management degree from the University of Prince Edward Island. Prior to entering provincial politics, she was the executive director of the PEI Business Women's Association (founded in 1994) for five years. Previously, she had been an employee of Veterans Affairs Canada.

=== Politics ===
Bell served as a member of the Legislative Assembly of Prince Edward Island from 13 December 2017 to 6 March 2023. She represented the electoral district of Charlottetown-Belvedere as a member of the Green Party of Prince Edward Island. She decided not to run in the 2023 Prince Edward Island general election for re-election. She also has a daughter and is a single mother. She ran for the leader of the Green Party of PEI in 2025, she announced her candidacy on February 24, 2025. She lost with 147 (22.4%) votes to Matt MacFarlane, who got 507 (77.5%) votes. She stated that some issues that many people in PEI deal with are, "Housing and grocery affordability, a struggling healthcare system, the climate crisis and environmental degradation, and global political instability and the spread of disinformation".

== Electoral record ==
2025 Green Party of Prince Edward Island leadership election

Candidate	Votes	
Candidate	#	%
Matt MacFarlane	507	77.52
Hannah Bell	147	22.48
Total	654	100.0

2019 Prince Edward Island general election: Charlottetown-Belvedere
Party	Candidate	Votes	%	±%
Green	Hannah Bell	1,286	40.40	+5.20
Progressive Conservative	Ronnie Carragher	998	31.30	+4.38
Liberal	Roxanne Carter-Thompson	846	26.60	-1.90
New Democratic	Trevor Leclerc	55	1.7	-7.98
Total valid votes		3,185	100.00	
Green hold		Swing		+4.79

Prince Edward Island provincial by-election, 27 November 2017: Charlottetown-Parkdale Resignation of Doug Currie
Party	Candidate	Votes	%	±%
Green	Hannah Bell	768	35.44	+16.29
Liberal	Bob Doiron	611	28.20	-15.50
Progressive Conservative	Melissa Hilton	586	27.04	+0.84
New Democratic	Michael Redmond	202	9.34	-1.60
Total valid votes		2,167	100	
Green gain from Liberal		Swing		+15.90
