= Dody Crane =

Canadian politician

Dolores (Dody) Crane

Leader of the New Democratic Party of Prince Edward Island Interim
- In office 1989–1991
- Preceded by: Jim Mayne
- Succeeded by: Larry Duchesne

Personal details
- Party: New Democratic Party
- Profession: lawyer

Dolores (Dody) Crane is a Canadian politician, who was interim leader of the Prince Edward Island New Democratic Party from 1989 to 1991. She originally ran as the party's candidate in Hillsborough in the 1988 federal election, finishing with what was at the time the best federal result for an NDP candidate in the province's history. Due to organizational upheaval in the provincial party following the resignation of Jim Mayne, she subsequently served as the party's spokesperson and acting leader until Larry Duchesne was selected as the party's new permanent leader in 1991.

She continued to be a New Democratic Party candidate in federal elections, running in Hillsborough again in the 1993, 1997 and 2000 elections, and in the successor riding of Charlottetown in the 2004 election.

She is the sister of Olive Crane, a former MLA and leader of the Prince Edward Island Progressive Conservative Party.

== Electoral record ==
2004 Canadian federal election: Charlottetown
Party	Candidate	Votes	%	±%	Expenditures
Liberal	Shawn Murphy	9,175	49.36	+6.80	$59,677.46
Conservative	Darren Peters	5,121	27.55	-7.80	$60,605.56
New Democratic	Dody Crane	3,428	18.44	-2.91	$13,197.84
Green	Will McFadden	760	4.09	–	$1,647.47
Christian Heritage	Baird Judson	105	0.56	–	$2,837.13
Total valid votes/expense limit		18,589	100.0	–	$61,440
Total rejected, unmarked and declined ballots		133	0.71		
Turnout		18,722	67.30		
Eligible voters		27,820			
Liberal notional hold		Swing		+7.30	
Changes from 2000 are based on redistributed results. Change for the Conservatives is based on the combined total of the Progressive Conservatives and the Canadian Alliance.

2000 Canadian federal election: Hillsborough
Party	Candidate	Votes	%
Liberal	Shawn Murphy	8,277	41.81
Progressive Conservative	Darren Peters	6,039	30.50
New Democratic	Dody Crane	4,328	21.86
Alliance	Gerry Stewart	1,005	5.08
Natural Law	Peter Cameron	92	0.46
Independent	Baird Judson	58	0.29
Turnout		19,895	67.2

1997 Canadian federal election: Hillsborough
Party	Candidate	Votes	%	±%
Liberal	George Proud	7,630	40.87	
New Democratic	Dody Crane	5,751	30.80	
Progressive Conservative	Mitchell Tweel	4,594	24.61	
Reform	Blaine Jensen	476	2.55	
Christian Heritage	Baird Judson	145	0.78	
Natural Law	Paula Price	74	0.40	
Turnout		18,847	71.2%	

1993 Canadian federal election: Hillsborough
Party	Candidate	Votes	%	±%
Liberal	George Proud	11,976	60.57	
Progressive Conservative	Thomas McMillan	5,269	26.65	
New Democratic	Dody Crane	1,143	5.78	
Reform	Freeman T. Whitty	744	3.76	
National	Dave Patterson	350	1.77	
Christian Heritage	Baird Judson	167	0.84	
Natural Law	Peter Cameron	123	0.62	

1988 Canadian federal election: Hillsborough
Party	Candidate	Votes	%	±%
Liberal	George Proud	8,897	43.68	
Progressive Conservative	Thomas McMillan	8,638	42.41	
New Democratic	Dody Crane	1,984	5.78	
Independent	David Weale	569	2.79	
Christian Heritage	Baird Judson	281	1.38	
