= 2022 United Kingdom electoral calendar =

This is a list of elections in the United Kingdom scheduled to be held in 2022. Included are local elections, by-elections on any level, referendums and internal party elections.

== Leadership elections ==
- 5 September – July–September 2022 Conservative Party leadership election
- 7 September – 2022 Green Party of England and Wales deputy leadership election
- 24 October – October 2022 Conservative Party leadership election

== February ==
- 24 February – Council by-election in Wickham Bishops and Woodham ward for Maldon District Council.

== March ==
- 3 March – Paulette Hamilton wins the 2022 Birmingham Erdington by-election.

== May ==
- 5 May –
  - 2022 United Kingdom local elections: The Conservatives suffer a net loss of 485 seats, which includes the London boroughs of Barnet, Wandsworth, and Westminster, formerly considered Tory strongholds. Labour gain than 108 seats, while the Liberal Democrats gain 240. The Green Party has one of its best ever results, with a net gain of 87 seats. In Scotland, the SNP gains 22 seats, while in Northern Ireland, Sinn Féin receives the largest vote share.
  - The 2022 Welsh local elections are contested under new boundaries. This is the first time Welsh councils can choose between the first-past-the-post system and a proportional single transferable vote (STV) system, but councils need to give advance notice of such a change. Overall, Welsh Labour gain control of one council and Plaid Cymru three, whilst the Welsh Conservatives lose one and Independents two.
  - The first Northern Ireland Assembly election is held.

== June ==
- 6 June – Sir Graham Brady, Chairman of the 1922 committee of the Conservative Party, announces a vote of confidence in Boris Johnson's leadership of the party. A secret ballot is held from 6-8pm. The party's MPs decide that they have confidence in Johnson's leadership. However, more than 40% vote against him, with a result of 211 to 148.
- 23 June – By-elections take place in Wakefield and Tiverton and Honiton. Labour win in Wakefield, while the Liberal Democrats win in Tiverton and Honiton, overturning a substantial Conservative majority.

== September ==
- 5 September – July–September 2022 Conservative Party leadership election: Liz Truss is elected as the leader of the Conservative Party, winning 57.4% of the final vote to Rishi Sunak's 42.6%.

== October ==
- 6 October – Six council by-elections are held. Lampeter ward on Ceredigion County Council, Butleigh and Baltonsborough ward on Mendip District Council, Highcliffe and Walkford ward on Bournemouth, Christchurch and Poole Council, St Anthony's ward on Eastbourne Borough Council, Sparkbrook and Balsall Heath East ward on Birmingham City Council and Bridgnorth West and Tasley ward on Shropshire Council
- 11 October – Labour MP Sam Tarry is deselected by his constituency Labour party following a trigger ballot in July.
- 13 October – Council by-election in Throston to elect one councillor to Hartlepool Borough Council.

== November ==
- 3 November – A by-election will be held in Selsdon Vale & Forestdale ward to elect a member of Croydon London Borough Council following the death of Cllr Badsha Quadir.
- 10 November – Two seats on South Kesteven District Council will be elected; in Bourne East Ward following the death of Cllr Judy Smith, and in Grantham St Wulfram's Ward, following the resignation of Cllr Jacky Smith.
- 17 November – A by-election in Linn ward for Glasgow City Council.

== December ==
- 1 December – 2022 City of Chester by-election
- 6 December – 2022 SNP Westminster leadership election
- 15 December – 2022 Stretford and Urmston by-election

== See also ==
- 2022 Canadian electoral calendar
- 2022 in the United Kingdom
