= 2025 Charlottetown-Hillsborough Park provincial by-election =

Election in Canada

← 2023	August 12, 2025	Next →

District of Charlottetown-Hillsborough Park
- Turnout: 47.84% (▼15.39pp)
	First party	Second party	Third party
Candidate	Carolyn Simpson	Dennis Jameson	Janine Karpakis
Party	Liberal	Progressive Conservative	Green
Popular vote	979	784	231
Percentage	47.78%	38.26%	11.27%
Swing	▲34.65%	▼23.65%	▼8.23%
MLA before election
Natalie Jameson
Progressive Conservative
Elected MLA
Carolyn Simpson
Liberal

A by-election took place on August 12, 2025, in the provincial riding of Charlottetown-Hillsborough Park to elect a member of the Legislative Assembly of Prince Edward Island. It was held on the same day as a by-election in Brackley-Hunter River.

The by-election was triggered by the resignation of Natalie Jameson, who resigned on February 11, 2025, to stand as the Conservative Party of Canada candidate for Charlottetown in the 2025 Canadian federal election. She was not elected. Jameson's husband Dennis was the Progressive Conservative candidate in the by-election.

It was originally announced that the by-election would take place on August 11, however, there was an error on the Election Date Calculation Tool used by Elections PEI.

== Result ==
Prince Edward Island provincial by-election, August 12, 2025: Charlottetown-Hillsborough Park Resignation of Natalie Jameson
** Preliminary results — Not yet official **
Party	Candidate	Votes	%	±%
Liberal	Carolyn Simpson	979	47.78	+34.65
Progressive Conservative	Dennis Jameson	784	38.26	-23.65
Green	Janine Karpakis	231	11.27	-8.23
New Democratic	Simone Webster	55	2.68	-1.98
Total valid votes		2,049	99.61	
Total rejected ballots		8	0.39	-0.09
Turnout		2,057	47.84	-15.39
Eligible voters		4,300		
Liberal gain from Progressive Conservative		Swing		+29.15

== Previous result ==
2023 Prince Edward Island general election: Charlottetown-Hillsborough Park
Party	Candidate	Votes	%	±%
Progressive Conservative	Natalie Jameson	1,660	61.92	+18.19
Green	Adina Nault	523	19.51	-9.20
Liberal	Dellon Paul	352	13.13	-12.58
New Democratic	Tristan Mitchell	125	4.66	+2.80
Island	Cari Barbour	21	0.78	
Total valid votes		2,681	99.25	
Total rejected ballots		13	0.48	+0.12
Turnout		2,694	63.22	+2.76
Eligible voters		4,261		
Progressive Conservative hold		Swing		+13.69
