= Shawn Murphy (politician) =

Canadian politician (born 1951)

The Honourable Shawn Murphy PC KC

Member of Parliament for Charlottetown
- In office 2000–2011
- Preceded by: George Proud
- Succeeded by: Sean Casey

Chair of the Standing Committee on Public Accounts
- In office May 4, 2006 – September 29, 2010
- Minister: John Baird; Vic Toews; Stockwell Day
- Preceded by: John G. Williams
- Succeeded by: Joe Volpe

Personal details
- Born: July 27, 1951 (age 74) Charlottetown, Prince Edward Island, Canada
- Party: Liberal
- Spouse: Yvette (Comeau) Murphy
- Profession: Attorney

Shawn Murphy, PC KC (born July 27, 1951) is a Canadian politician.

Born in Charlottetown, Prince Edward Island, Murphy attended the University of Prince Edward Island, and later the University of New Brunswick Faculty of Law, graduating with a law degree in 1976. He returned to Prince Edward Island and joined a local law practice, working alongside future Premier Joe Ghiz. In 1997, he was made a Queen's Counsel. Murphy is married and has three adult children: Kevin, Paul, and Brian.

Murphy was a member of the Liberal Party of Canada in the House of Commons of Canada, representing the riding of Charlottetown since the election of 2000. During the Martin government, he served as Parliamentary Secretary to the Minister of Fisheries and Oceans with special emphasis on the Oceans Action Plan.

He was re-elected with nearly 50% of the vote in the 2004 federal election. Despite rumours of his vulnerability in the 2006 federal election, Murphy was reelected with slightly more than 50% of the vote. With the Liberals now in opposition, Murphy became the chairman of the Public Accounts Committee. Murphy was re-elected in the 2008 federal election, again winning by a comfortable margin. He announced on October 13, 2010 that he would not be running in the next election.

== Electoral record ==
2000 Canadian federal election: Hillsborough
Party	Candidate	Votes	%
Liberal	Shawn Murphy	8,277	41.81
Progressive Conservative	Darren Peters	6,039	30.50
New Democratic	Dody Crane	4,328	21.86
Alliance	Gerry Stewart	1,005	5.08
Natural Law	Peter Cameron	92	0.46
Independent	Baird Judson	58	0.29
Turnout		19,895	67.2

2004 Canadian federal election: Charlottetown
Party	Candidate	Votes	%	±%	Expenditures
Liberal	Shawn Murphy	9,175	49.36	+6.80	$59,677.46
Conservative	Darren Peters	5,121	27.55	-7.80	$60,605.56
New Democratic	Dody Crane	3,428	18.44	-2.91	$13,197.84
Green	Will McFadden	760	4.09	–	$1,647.47
Christian Heritage	Baird Judson	105	0.56	–	$2,837.13
Total valid votes/expense limit		18,589	100.0	–	$61,440
Total rejected, unmarked and declined ballots		133	0.71		
Turnout		18,722	67.30		
Eligible voters		27,820			
Liberal notional hold		Swing		+7.30	
Changes from 2000 are based on redistributed results. Change for the Conservatives is based on the combined total of the Progressive Conservatives and the Canadian Alliance.

2006 Canadian federal election: Charlottetown
Party	Candidate	Votes	%	±%	Expenditures
Liberal	Shawn Murphy	9,586	50.16	+0.80	$60,442.09
Conservative	Tom DeBlois	6,524	34.14	+6.59	$60,317.15
New Democratic	Brian Pollard	2,126	11.12	-7.32	$5,251.38
Green	David Daughton	586	3.07	-1.02	$780.62
Christian Heritage	Baird Judson	97	0.51	-0.05	$5,346.77
Total valid votes/expense limit		19,112	100.0	–	$62,665
Total rejected, unmarked and declined ballots		114	0.59	-0.12	
Turnout		19,226	70.75	+3.45	
Eligible voters		27,175			
Liberal hold		Swing		-2.90	

2008 Canadian federal election: Charlottetown
Party	Candidate	Votes	%	±%	Expenditures
Liberal	Shawn Murphy	8,893	50.06	-0.10	$66,093.14
Conservative	Tom DeBlois	5,704	32.11	-2.03	$48,302.66
New Democratic	Brian Pollard	2,187	12.31	+1.19	$4,744.42
Green	Laura Bisaillon	858	4.83	+1.76	$1,257.27
Christian Heritage	Baird Judson	124	0.70	+0.19	$8,750.00
Total valid votes/expense limit		17,776	100.0	–	$67,455
Total rejected, unmarked and declined ballots		137	0.77	+0.18	
Turnout		17,913	66.14	-4.61	
Eligible voters		27,083			
Liberal hold		Swing		+0.96	

== Notes ==
Political offices
Preceded by John G. Williams, Conservative	Chairman of the Public Accounts Committee; 2006–2010	Succeeded by Joe Volpe, Liberal
Preceded by Paul Szabo, Liberal	Chairman of the Information, Privacy and Ethics Committee; 2010–2011	Succeeded by Unknown
