= Susie Dillon =

Canadian politician

The Honourable Susie Dillon MLA

Deputy Speaker of the Prince Edward Island legislature
- Incumbent
- Assumed office March 25, 2026
- Preceded by: Brad Trivers

Member of the Legislative Assembly of Prince Edward Island for Charlottetown-Belvedere
- Incumbent
- Assumed office April 3, 2023
- Preceded by: Hannah Bell

Personal details
- Party: Progressive Conservative

Susie Dillon is a Canadian politician who was elected to the Legislative Assembly of Prince Edward Island in the 2023 provincial election. She represents Charlottetown-Belvedere as a member of the Progressive Conservative Party of Prince Edward Island.

== Electoral record ==
2023 Prince Edward Island general election: Charlottetown-Belvedere
Party	Candidate	Votes	%	±%
Progressive Conservative	Susie Dillon	1,418	51.10	+19.97
Green	Joanna Morrison	639	23	-17.40
Liberal	Marcia Carroll	560	20.20	-6.40
New Democratic	Aidin Mousavin	133	4.80	+3.10
Total valid votes		2787		
Total rejected ballots		12	0.43	
Turnout		2,799		
Progressive Conservative gain		Swing		+19.97
