= 2022 New Democratic Party of Prince Edward Island leadership election =

Leadership election of a Canadian political party

2022 Prince Edward Island New Democratic Party leadership election
- April 23, 2022
Candidate	Michelle Neill
Leader before election
Joe Byrne
Elected Leader
Michelle Neill

The 2022 New Democratic Party of Prince Edward Island leadership election was held on April 23, 2022. It was initially planned for November 6, 2021, but was postponed. The election was called due to the position being vacated by former leader Joe Byrne. His resignation followed his failed run during 2019 Prince Edward Island general election in District 12, Charlottetown-Victoria Park, losing to Green Party candidate Karla Bernard. Byrne resigned as PEI NDP leader effective September 1, 2020. Michelle Neill was the sole candidate and was elected leader unanimously.

2022 New Democratic Party of Prince Edward Island leadership election
- Date: April 23, 2022
- Convention: Charlottetown
- Resigning leader: Joe Byrne
- Won by: Michelle Neill
- Candidates: 1

== Candidates ==
=== Declared ===
- Michelle Neill, NDP candidate for Malpeque in the 2021 Canadian Federal Election. Prior to announcing her candidacy, Neill involved herself in community organizations including Wings on Ice Skating Club, the Charlottetown Figure Skating Club, North Star Minor Hockey Association, Skate PEI, and Hockey PEI, and most recently with Mothers Against Drunk Driving (MADD) Central PEI.

Candidacy announced: January 17, 2022
Campaign website: None or Unknown
Neill's campaign message is: “As leader of the Island New Democrats I will be a strong voice in leading this party to be the change that Islanders need and desire.”

== See also ==
- New Democratic Party of Prince Edward Island leadership elections
