= 2025 Yukon Liberal Party leadership election =

Canadian territorial party election

- June 19, 2025
Candidate	Mike Pemberton	Doris Bill
Results	442 (50.75%)	429 (49.25%)
Leader before election
Ranj Pillai
Leader after election
Mike Pemberton

2025 Yukon Liberal Party leadership election
- Date: June 19, 2025
- Convention: Sternwheeler Hotel, Whitehorse, Yukon
- Resigning leader: Ranj Pillai
- Won by: Mike Pemberton
- Ballots: 1
- Candidates: 2
- Entrance fee: $7,000

The 2025 Yukon Liberal Party leadership election was held on June 19 in Whitehorse. The election was called as a result of the party leader and premier Ranj Pillai's decision to announce his pending resignation on May 7. The party elected Mike Pemberton as its new leader, in a narrow margin.

== Background ==
The deadline to submit a candidacy was May 29.

Party members could vote in person in Whitehorse or by proxy. The party uses a ranked preferential ballot (instant-runoff voting), but only two candidates entered the race, so there was no need for vote transfers or subsequent rounds of vote counting as happens sometimes under IRV.

To join the party, one must have been a Yukon resident and at least fourteen years of age. There was no minimum period one had to live in the territory to be eligible to vote, and Canadian citizenship was not a requirement. Following the results, runner-up Doris Bill accused winner Mike Pemberton of signing up recent immigrants to the territory as party members.

Mike Pemberton, as the new leader of the governing party of Yukon, became the territory's 11th premier. This was the Liberals' first contested leadership race since 2005, when Arthur Mitchell defeated former premier Pat Duncan. Outgoing leader Ranj Pillai and former leader Sandy Silver had both been acclaimed to the post.

== Candidates ==
=== Doris Bill ===
Background: Former Kwanlin Dün First Nation chief.
Date announced: May 12, 2025

=== Mike Pemberton ===
Background: Businessman.
Date announced: May 27, 2025

== Results ==
2025 Yukon Liberal Party leadership election
Candidate	1st ballot	
Name	Votes cast	%
Mike Pemberton	442	50.75
Doris Bill	429	49.25
Valid votes	871	99.77
Invalid votes	2	0.23
Total votes	873	100.00
Registered voters/turnout	>1000	<87.30

== See also ==
- 2023 Yukon Liberal Party leadership election
