= George Proud =

Canadian politician (1939–2019)

Member of Parliament for Hillsborough
- In office 21 November 1988 – 26 November 2000
- Preceded by: Thomas McMillan
- Succeeded by: Shawn Murphy

Personal details
- Born: George Albert Proud; 9 April 1939 Charlottetown, Prince Edward Island, Canada
- Died: 23 October 2019 (aged 80) Charlottetown, Prince Edward Island, Canada
- Party: Liberal Party of Canada (1988-2000); Prince Edward Island Liberal Party (1974-1979?)
- Profession: property supervisor

George Albert Proud (9 April 1939 – 23 October 2019) was a member of the House of Commons of Canada from 1988 to 2000.

Proud was born in Charlottetown, Prince Edward Island. From 1974 to 1979, he was a provincial politician in the Legislative Assembly of Prince Edward Island as a Councillor for the 5th Queens provincial electoral district.

Proud moved to federal politics in 1988 general election when he was elected in the Hillsborough electoral district for the Liberal party. He was re-elected in the 1993 and 1997 federal elections. His national Parliament experience spanned the 34th, 35th and 36th Canadian Parliaments.

After leaving federal politics as of the 2000 federal election, Proud became a member of the Canadian Transportation Agency in 2001. He died in 2019 at the age of 80 at a hospital in Charlottetown.

== Electoral record ==
1997 Canadian federal election: Hillsborough
Party	Candidate	Votes	%	±%
Liberal	George Proud	7,630	40.87	
New Democratic	Dody Crane	5,751	30.80	
Progressive Conservative	Mitchell Tweel	4,594	24.61	
Reform	Blaine Jensen	476	2.55	
Christian Heritage	Baird Judson	145	0.78	
Natural Law	Paula Price	74	0.40	
Turnout		18,847	71.2%	

1993 Canadian federal election: Hillsborough
Party	Candidate	Votes	%	±%
Liberal	George Proud	11,976	60.57	
Progressive Conservative	Thomas McMillan	5,269	26.65	
New Democratic	Dody Crane	1,143	5.78	
Reform	Freeman T. Whitty	744	3.76	
National	Dave Patterson	350	1.77	
Christian Heritage	Baird Judson	167	0.84	
Natural Law	Peter Cameron	123	0.62	

1988 Canadian federal election: Hillsborough
Party	Candidate	Votes	%	±%
Liberal	George Proud	8,897	43.68	
Progressive Conservative	Thomas McMillan	8,638	42.41	
New Democratic	Dody Crane	1,984	5.78	
Independent	David Weale	569	2.79	
Christian Heritage	Baird Judson	281	1.38	

Parliament of Canada
Preceded by Thomas McMillan, Prog. Cons.	Member of Parliament from Hillsborough; 1988–2000	Succeeded by Shawn Murphy, Liberal
