= 2025 New Brunswick municipal by-elections =

Municipal election in Canada

The 2025 New Brunswick municipal elections were held on April 14, 2025.

== April elections ==
Seven municipalities had by-elections on April 14, 2025.

=== Arcadia ===
Clinton Sharpe was elected mayor with 426 votes out of a total 1,065 ballots cast.

=== Belle-Baie ===
Brigitte Couturier was acclaimed Ward 5 councillor in Belle-Baie.

=== Fundy Albert ===
Jim Campbell was elected mayor of Fundy Albert with 993 out of 1,599 votes cast. Dave Garden was elected Ward 1 councillor with 167 of 280 votes.

=== Hartland ===
George Boone was elected Ward 2 councillor in Hartland, New Brunswick with 147 votes out of a total 265 ballots cast.

=== Lakeland Ridges ===
Barbara Glanville was elected Ward 4 councillor in Lakeland Ridges with 91 of 127 votes cast.

=== Memramcook ===
Etienne Gaudet was elected councillor in Memramcook with 807 votes out of a total 1,345 ballots cast.

=== Miramichi ===
Peggy Doyle and Guy Richard were both elected as councillors in Miramichi. Out of 3,906 ballots cast, Doyle received 2,296 votes and Richard received 1,634.

=== Miramichi River Valley ===
There were two seats up for election in Miramichi River Valley. Ray Croft was elected councillor at large with 378 of 1,387 votes cast. In Ward 1, Paula Dawn Hare was acclaimed.

=== Sunbury-York South ===
There were two seats up for election in Sunbury-York South where Cory Allen was acclaimed in Ward 1 and Hajnalka Hartwick was acclaimed in Ward 2.

== See also ==
- 2025 Canadian electoral calendar
- Municipal elections in Canada
