= Carolyn Simpson (politician) =

Canadian politician

Carolyn Simpson MLA

Member of the Legislative Assembly of Prince Edward Island for Charlottetown-Hillsborough Park
- Incumbent
- Assumed office August 12, 2025
- Preceded by: Natalie Jameson

Personal details
- Party: Liberal

Carolyn Simpson is a Canadian politician, who was elected to the Legislative Assembly of Prince Edward Island in the 2025 Charlottetown-Hillsborough Park provincial by-election. She defeated the husband of resigning Progressive Conservative MLA Natalie Jameson and gained the seat for the Liberal Party of Prince Edward Island.

== Electoral record ==
Prince Edward Island provincial by-election, August 12, 2025: Charlottetown-Hillsborough Park Resignation of Natalie Jameson
** Preliminary results — Not yet official **
Party	Candidate	Votes	%	±%
Liberal	Carolyn Simpson	979	47.78	+34.65
Progressive Conservative	Dennis Jameson	784	38.26	-23.65
Green	Janine Karpakis	231	11.27	-8.23
New Democratic	Simone Webster	55	2.68	-1.98
Total valid votes		2,049	99.61	
Total rejected ballots		8	0.39	-0.09
Turnout		2,057	47.84	-15.39
Eligible voters		4,300		
Liberal gain from Progressive Conservative		Swing		+29.15
