= 2023 Yukon Liberal Party leadership election =

Canadian territorial party election

- Date: January 8, 2023
- Convention: Whitehorse, Yukon
- Resigning leader: Sandy Silver
- Won by: Ranj Pillai
- Ballots: 1
- Candidates: 1
- Entrance fee: $5,000

The 2023 Yukon Liberal Party leadership election was held on January 8, 2023, in Whitehorse. The election was called as a result of the party leader and premier Sandy Silver's decision to announce his pending resignation on September 9, 2022.

== Rules ==
The deadline to submit a candidacy was January 7. The election was supposed to take place on January 28.

Party members will be able to vote in person in Whitehorse, or by proxy. If there are several candidates, voting will be done by a ranked preferential ballot, which means there may be several rounds of voting before a winner is declared.

The new leader will become the 10th premier of Yukon.

== Candidates ==
=== Declared ===
==== Ranj Pillai ====
Background: MLA for Porter Creek South (2016–2025), Deputy Premier and Ministry of Energy, Mines and Resources under Silver.
Date announced: November 24, 2022

=== Declined ===
- Jeanie McLean, MLA for Mountainview (2016–2025), Government House Leader, Minister of Justice, Minister of Education, and Deputy Premier under Silver.
- Tracy-Anne McPhee, MLA for Riverdale South (2016–2025), Minister of Tourism and Culture under Silver.
- John Streicker, MLA for Mount Lorne-Southern Lakes (2016–2025), Minister of Community Services under Silver.

== Results ==
As there was only one official candidate, Ranj Pillai was acclaimed party leader on January 8 by the party executive.
