= Ranj Pillai =

Canadian politician

The Honourable Ranj Pillai
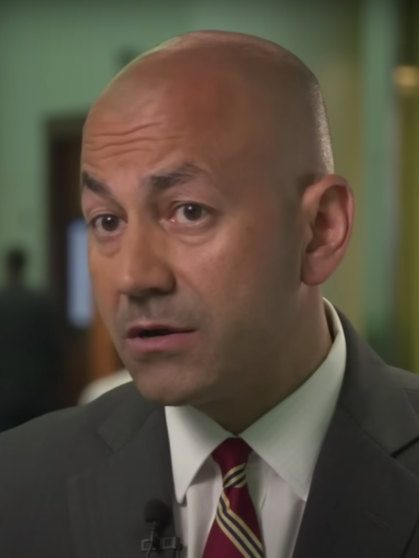
- Pillai in 2022

10th Premier of Yukon
- In office January 14, 2023 – June 27, 2025
- Deputy: Jeanie McLean
- Commissioner: Angélique Bernard; Adeline Webber
- Preceded by: Sandy Silver
- Succeeded by: Mike Pemberton

Leader of the Yukon Liberal Party
- In office January 9, 2023 – June 19, 2025
- Preceded by: Sandy Silver
- Succeeded by: Mike Pemberton

Deputy Premier Minister of Energy, Mines and Resources
- In office December 3, 2016 – January 14, 2023
- Premier: Sandy Silver
- Preceded by: Elaine Taylor; Scott Kent
- Succeeded by: Jeanie McLean (as Deputy Premier); John Streicker (as Minister of Energy, Mines and Resources)

Member of the Yukon Legislative Assembly for Porter Creek South
- In office November 7, 2016 – October 3, 2025
- Preceded by: Mike Nixon
- Succeeded by: Adam Gerle

Personal details
- Born: January 1974 (age 52) Inverness, Nova Scotia, Canada
- Party: Yukon Liberal

Ranj Pillai (born January 1974) is a Canadian politician who served as the tenth premier of Yukon and leader of the Yukon Liberal Party from 2023 to 2025. He represented the electoral district of Porter Creek South in the Legislative Assembly of Yukon, to which he was first elected in the 2016 election.

== Early life ==
Ranj was born in Inverness, Nova Scotia. He grew up in Brook Village and Inverness before moving to Antigonish to complete his high school diploma. His father, Gopi (N.G.) Pillai, is a retired Indian doctor from Kerala and his mother, Johnena Lee, is a retired nurse.

== Political career ==
Pillai sat as a Whitehorse City Councillor from 2009 to 2012. While on council, he helped bring Scotiabank Hockey Day in Canada to Whitehorse and was awarded the 2011 Yukon Tourism Champion Award for his efforts.

Pillai was also the executive director of the Champagne and Aishihik First Nations, and has held roles with Northern Vision Development and Yukon College.

On December 3, 2016, Pillai was sworn into the Cabinet of Premier Sandy Silver as Deputy Premier and Minister of Energy, Mines and Resources, and Economic Development. He is also the Minister responsible for Yukon Development Corporation and the Yukon Energy Corporation.

On November 25, 2022, following Sandy Silver's resignation as Liberal leader pending the election of a successor, Pillai announced his candidacy for leader of the Yukon Liberal Party. He was acclaimed party leader in January 2023 because there were no other candidates in the race, thus becoming the premier-designate. He is the second Indo-Canadian to become premier of a province or territory, after Ujjal Dosanjh in British Columbia. He was sworn in as premier on January 14.

He declined to lead the party into the 2025 Yukon general election, announcing his decision to resign as party leader, upon the selection of his successor, and not seek re-election as an MLA, on May 7, 2025. Businessman Mike Pemberton was elected to succeed him in June. Pillai retained his roles as Minister of Economic Development and Minister responsible for the Yukon Housing Corporation in Pemberton's cabinet, having held those roles in Silver's cabinet.

== Personal life ==
Pillai is married and has two children.

== Electoral record ==
2021 Yukon general election: Porter Creek South
Party	Candidate	Votes	%	±%
Liberal	Ranj Pillai	309	47.17	+0.6%
Yukon Party	Chad Sjodin	262	40	+0.6%
New Democratic	Colette Acheson	84	12.82	−1.3%
Total valid votes		655		
Total rejected ballots				
Turnout				
Eligible voters				
Liberal hold		Swing		−17.18
Source(s) "Unofficial Election Results 2021". Elections Yukon.

=== Yukon general election, 2016 ===
Porter Creek South
Party	Candidate	Votes	%	±%
Liberal	Ranj Pillai	337	46.6%	+6.0%
Yukon Party	Mike Nixon	285	39.4%	−3.5%
NDP	Shirley Chua-Tan	102	14.1%	−2.4%
Total		724	100.0%	–

=== Whitehorse municipal election, 2009 ===
Whitehorse municipal election, 2009
Candidate	Votes	%
Doug Graham	2,678	13.1%
Ranj Pillai	2,422	11.8%
Betty Irwin	2,001	9.8%
Dave Stockdale	1,986	9.7%
Florence Roberts	1,794	8.8%
Dave Austin	1,750	8.5%
Jeanine Myhre	1,459	7.1%
Ron Swizdaryk	1,450	7.1%
Graham Lang	1,395	6.8%
Skeeter Miller-Wright	1,370	6.7%
Janet Brault	1,163	5.7%
Michael Buurman	1,021	5.0%
Total	20,475	100%
