= Natalie Jameson =

Canadian politician

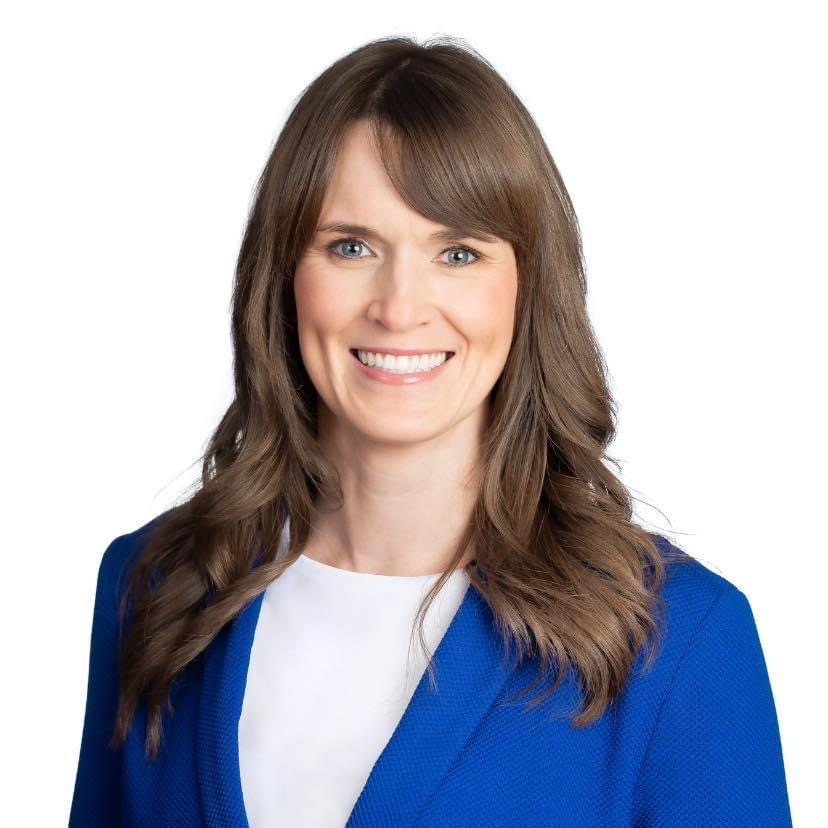
- Jameson in 2023

Member of the Legislative Assembly of Prince Edward Island for Charlottetown-Hillsborough Park
- In office July 15, 2019 – February 11, 2025
- Preceded by: Riding Established
- Succeeded by: Carolyn Simpson

Personal details
- Party: Conservative; Progressive Conservative

Natalie Jameson is a former Canadian politician who represented the Charlottetown-Hillsborough Park district, in the Legislative Assembly of Prince Edward Island from 2019 to 2025.

== Early and personal life ==
Jameson is the daughter of Kevin and Christa Curran, and grew up in Charlottetown. She attended both Holland College and the University of Prince Edward Island.

Jameson is married to Dennis Jameson, and has two children. Dennis became the Progressive Conservative candidate for Charlottetown-Hillsborough Park by-election following her resignation.

== Political career ==
Jameson was elected as the MLA for District 9, Charlottetown-Hillsborough Park in the deferred election held on July 15, 2019.

She was re-elected in the 2023 Prince Edward Island Provincial Election.

Jameson resigned from the Legislative Assembly on February 11, 2025. She was the Conservative Party of Canada candidate in Charlottetown for the 2025 Canadian federal election. She was not elected. The by-election for her provincial seat was held on August 12, 2025.

== Electoral record ==
2025 Canadian federal election: Charlottetown
Party	Candidate	Votes	%	±%	Expenditures
Liberal	Sean Casey	13,656	64.75	+18.05	$102,175.93
Conservative	Natalie Jameson	6,139	29.11	−1.95	$103,634.18
New Democratic	Joe Byrne	906	4.30	−6.42	$9,651.86
Green	Daniel Cousins	257	1.22	−8.37	$0.00
People's	Robert Lucas	131	0.62	−1.31	$1,794.70
Total valid votes/expense limit		21,089	99.00	+0.03	$106,504.98
Total rejected ballots		214	1.00	–0.03	
Turnout		21,303	76.59	+6.12	
Eligible voters		27,814			
Liberal notional hold		Swing		+10.00	
Source: Elections Canada
Note: number of eligible voters does not include voting day registrations.

2023 Prince Edward Island general election: Charlottetown-Hillsborough Park
Party	Candidate	Votes	%	±%
Progressive Conservative	Natalie Jameson	1,660	61.92	+18.19
Green	Adina Nault	523	19.51	-9.20
Liberal	Dellon Paul	352	13.13	-12.58
New Democratic	Tristan Mitchell	125	4.66	+2.80
Island	Cari Barbour	21	0.78	
Total valid votes		2,681	99.25	
Total rejected ballots		13	0.48	+0.12
Turnout		2,694	63.22	+2.76
Eligible voters		4,261		
Progressive Conservative hold		Swing		+13.69

2019 Prince Edward Island general election: Charlottetown-Hillsborough Park
Party	Candidate	Votes	%
Progressive Conservative	Natalie Jameson	1,080	43.72
Green	John Andrew	709	28.70
Liberal	Karen Lavers	635	25.71
New Democratic	Gordon Gay	46	1.86
Total valid votes		2,470	
Total rejected ballots			
Turnout			
Eligible voters			

== Roles ==
Responsibility	Start date	End date
Minister responsible for the Status of Women	February 2020	October 2024
Minister of Environment, Water and Climate	February 2020	February 2021
Minister of Education and Lifelong Learning	February 2021	April 2023
Minister of Education and Early Years	April 2023	October 2024
