= Mike Pemberton =

Canadian politician

The Honourable Mike Pemberton

11th Premier of Yukon
- In office June 27, 2025 – November 22, 2025
- Deputy: Jeanie McLean
- Commissioner: Adeline Webber
- Preceded by: Ranj Pillai
- Succeeded by: Currie Dixon

Leader of the Yukon Liberal Party
- In office June 19, 2025 – January 21, 2026
- Preceded by: Ranj Pillai
- Succeeded by: Debra-Leigh Reti (interim)

Personal details
- Born: 1963 (age 62–63) Nova Scotia, Canada
- Party: Liberal (federal); Yukon Liberal (territorial)
- Children: 4

Mike Pemberton (born 1963) is a Canadian businessman and politician who served as the 11th premier of Yukon from June to November 2025. He was also the leader of the Yukon Liberal Party from June 19, 2025 to January 21, 2026. He was not a member of the Yukon Legislative Assembly during his time as premier.

== Life and early career ==
Pemberton was born in Nova Scotia, and has four children. He previously owned a furniture store in Whitehorse, and served as former premier Ranj Pillai's 2023 leadership campaign spokesperson. He served as chair of both the Whitehorse and Yukon chambers of commerce, Yukon development corporation, and as a board member for Yukon Energy. He also served on the Yukon Workers’ Compensation Appeal Tribunal and was a long-time President of the Yukon Community Crime Stoppers.

Politically, Pemberton formerly served as chair of the Liberal Party of Canada's Yukon wing, responsible for party organizing in the territory. He was also the vice president of the Yukon Liberal Party. The Yukon Liberal Party itself is not organizationally linked to the federal Liberals in any official manner.

== Political career ==
After Pillai announced that he would not lead the party into the 2025 Yukon general election on May 7, 2025, Pemberton joined the Yukon Liberal leadership race on May 27. On June 19, he won the 2025 Yukon Liberal Party leadership election after narrowly defeating Doris Bill by 13 votes. Bill accused Pemberton of signing up recent immigrants to the territory as party members. He became the premier-designate until officially being sworn in as premier on June 27. As premier, he served as Minister responsible for the Executive Council Office, Minister responsible for the Yukon Housing Corporation, and Minister of Economic Development. Pemberton signed agreements with other provinces and territories during his tenure, to reduce interprovincial trade barriers in the midst of the United States trade war with Canada. During the Council of Yukon First Nations general assembly, Pemberton made racially insensitive comments, with the party apologizing on his behalf.

All incumbent Cabinet ministers declined to seek re-election in 2025; Speaker Jeremy Harper was the only Liberal MLA who sought re-election. On October 3, Pemberton asked the Commissioner to dissolve the Legislative Assembly for a general territorial election on November 3, 2025. He led the Liberals to a third place finish with one seat, behind the Yukon Party and New Democratic Party; it is one of the worst results in party history. Pemberton himself placed third in Whitehorse West, failing to win a seat.

In January 2026, before the party's annual general meeting, he resigned as Liberal leader and was replaced by Debra-Leigh Reti on an interim basis.

== Electoral record ==
2025 Yukon general election: Whitehorse West
| Party | Candidate | Votes | % | ±% |
|---|---|---|---|---|
| Yukon Party | Laura Lang | 615 | 55.06 | +17.58 |
| New Democratic | Katherine McCallum | 363 | 32.50 | +9.67 |
| Liberal | Mike Pemberton | 139 | 12.44 | -27.24 |
| Total valid votes | | 1,117 | | |
| Total rejected ballots | | | | |
| Turnout | | | 52.54 | |
| Eligible voters | | 2,126 | | |
| Yukon Party gain from Liberal | | Swing | | +22.41 |
Source(s) "2025 General Election Official Results". Elections Yukon.

2025 Yukon Liberal Party leadership election
| Candidate | First ballot | |
| Candidate | Votes | % |
|---|---|---|
| Mike Pemberton | 442 | 50.75 |
| Doris Bill | 429 | 49.25 |
| Valid votes | 871 | 99.77 |
| Invalid votes | 2 | 0.23 |
| Total votes | 873 | 100.00 |
| Registered voters/turnout | >1000 | <87.30 |
