= Park West School Division =

School district in Manitoba

The Park West School Division is a school district in Manitoba near the border with Saskatchewan. It was formed in 2002 from the merger of the Birdtail River and Pelly Trail School Divisions.

== History ==
The Pelly Trail division made a controversial decision not to allow Manitoba Premier Howard Pawley to address a group of high-school students in 1985. Trustee Len Derkach argued that the school board "wanted to keep politics out of the school system", although a spokesperson for the premier indicated that the talk would not have been partisan in nature. The spokesperson added that Pawley had never been refused permission to speak to students before.
