= 2025 Green Party of Prince Edward Island leadership election =

- June 7, 2025
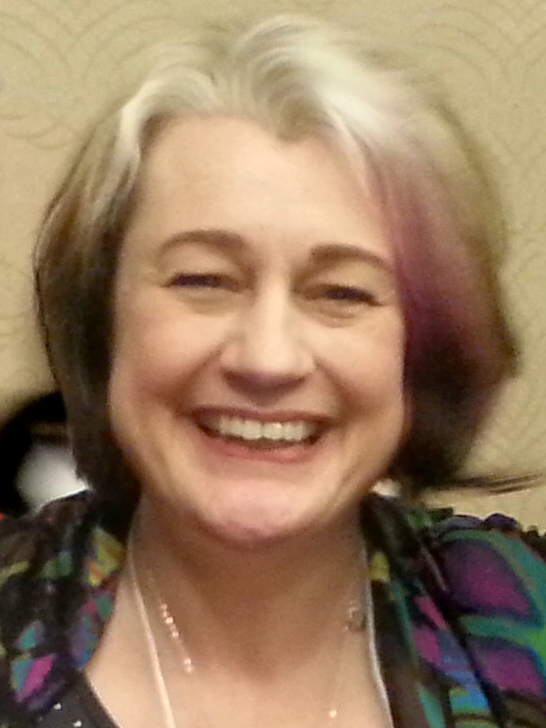
Candidate	Matt MacFarlane	Hannah Bell
Votes	507 (77.5%)	147 (22.4%)
Previous leader
Karla Bernard (interim)
Elected leader
Matt MacFarlane

Green Party of Prince Edward Island leadership election
- Date: June 7, 2025
- Convention: Bluefield High School, Hampshire, Prince Edward Island
- Resigning leader: Peter Bevan-Baker
- Won by: Matt MacFarlane
- Ballots: 1
- Candidates: 2 (+ none of the above)

The Green Party of Prince Edward Island leadership election was called after the resignation of leader Peter Bevan-Baker and was held on June 7, 2025 in Prince Edward Island. This was the Green Party's first contested leadership election.

In July 2023, Karla Bernard, MLA was named interim leader. Previous leader Peter Bevan-Baker resigned following the significant loss of party seats in the previous provincial election.

Borden-Kinkora MLA Matt MacFarlane won the leadership election with 77.5% of the vote.

== Timeline ==
- July 21, 2023 – Peter Bevan-Baker resigns, Karla Bernard appointed as interim leader.
- February 7, 2024 – Matt MacFarlane wins a by-election in Borden-Kinkora, gaining the seat for the Green Party.
- April 16, 2024 – It is announced that the election will take place after the next federal election.
- January 2025 – The election date is moved from May 2026 to June 2025.
- January 24, 2025 – MLA MacFarlane declares candidacy.
- February 24, 2025 – Former MLA Hannah Bell declares candidacy.
- March 12, 2025 – Bell and MacFarlane approved as candidates.
- June 7, 2025 – Election is held.

== Candidates ==
Applications for the leadership contest opened on February 1 and closed on March 1. The party vetted the candidates before publicly announcing them on March 12.

- Hannah Bell, former MLA for Charlottetown-Belvedere (2019–2023) and Charlottetown-Parkdale (2017–2019). Announced candidacy on February 24, 2025.
- Matt MacFarlane, MLA for Borden-Kinkora (2024–present). Announced candidacy on January 24, 2025.
- The None of the above ballot option was available to members.

== Results ==
Candidate	Votes	
Candidate	#	%
Matt MacFarlane	507	77.52
Hannah Bell	147	22.48
Total	654	100.0
