= Charlottetown-Hillsborough Park =

Provincial electoral district in Prince Edward Island, Canada

Prince Edward Island electoral district
- Coordinates: 46.276°N 63.106°W

Provincial electoral district
- Legislature: Legislative Assembly of Prince Edward Island
MLA
Carolyn Simpson
Liberal
- District created: 2019
- First contested: 2019
- Last contested: 2025 (by-election)

Demographics
- Census division: Queens County
- Census subdivision: Charlottetown

Charlottetown-Hillsborough Park (District 9) is a provincial electoral district for the Legislative Assembly of Prince Edward Island, Canada. It was created prior to the 2019 election from parts of the former districts Tracadie-Hillsborough Park, York-Oyster Bed, and Charlottetown-Sherwood.

The riding is located in the city of Charlottetown, and includes the neighbourhoods of East Royalty, Hillsborough Park and Falconwood.

== Members ==
The riding has elected the following members of the Legislative Assembly:

Members of the Legislative Assembly for Charlottetown-Hillsborough Park
Assembly	Years	Member	Party
66th	2019–2023	Natalie Jameson	Progressive Conservative
67th	2023–2025	Natalie Jameson	Progressive Conservative
67th	2025–present	Carolyn Simpson	Liberal

== Election results ==
=== Charlottetown-Hillsborough Park, 2019–present ===
Prince Edward Island provincial by-election, August 12, 2025 Resignation of Natalie Jameson
** Preliminary results — Not yet official **
Party	Candidate	Votes	%	±%
Liberal	Carolyn Simpson	979	47.78	+34.65
Progressive Conservative	Dennis Jameson	784	38.26	-23.65
Green	Janine Karpakis	231	11.27	-8.23
New Democratic	Simone Webster	55	2.68	-1.98
Total valid votes		2,049	99.61	
Total rejected ballots		8	0.39	-0.09
Turnout		2,057	47.84	-15.39
Eligible voters		4,300		
Liberal gain from Progressive Conservative		Swing		+29.15

2023 Prince Edward Island general election
Party	Candidate	Votes	%	±%
Progressive Conservative	Natalie Jameson	1,660	61.92	+18.19
Green	Adina Nault	523	19.51	-9.20
Liberal	Dellon Paul	352	13.13	-12.58
New Democratic	Tristan Mitchell	125	4.66	+2.80
Island	Cari Barbour	21	0.78	
Total valid votes		2,681	99.25	
Total rejected ballots		13	0.48	+0.12
Turnout		2,694	63.22	+2.76
Eligible voters		4,261		
Progressive Conservative hold		Swing		+13.69

The district was excluded from the 2019 Prince Edward Island general election due to the death of registered Green Party candidate Josh Underhay on April 19, 2019. A deferred election was held on July 15, 2019. Nominated PC candidate, Sarah Stewart-Clark, withdrew her candidacy on May 26, 2019, for personal reasons. She was later replaced by Natalie Jameson.

2019 Prince Edward Island general election
Party	Candidate	Votes	%	±%
Progressive Conservative	Natalie Jameson	1,080	43.72	+10.75
Green	John Andrew	709	28.70	+20.68
Liberal	Karen Lavers	635	25.71	-12.26
New Democratic	Gordon Gay	46	1.86	-19.18
Total valid votes		2,470	99.64	
Total rejected ballots		9	0.36	
Turnout		2,479	60.46	
Eligible voters		4,100		
Progressive Conservative notional gain from Liberal		Swing		+11.51

2015 Prince Edward Island general election redistributed results
Party	Votes	%
Liberal	1,117	37.97
Progressive Conservative	970	32.97
New Democratic	619	21.04
Green	236	8.02
Source(s) Source: Ridingbuilder

== Referendum and plebiscite results ==
=== 2019 electoral reform referendum ===
The 2019 Prince Edward Island electoral reform referendum was held on April 23, 2019. Although the general election in the district was deferred, the referendum was not.

2019 Prince Edward Island electoral reform referendum
Side	Votes	%
Yes	776	51.80
No	722	48.20
Total valid votes	1,489	100.00
Source "Island Referendum Vote on Electoral Reform: Island Referendum Vote on Electoral Reform". Archived from the original on July 15, 2019.

== See also ==
- List of Prince Edward Island provincial electoral districts
- Canadian provincial electoral districts
