= New Democratic Party of Prince Edward Island leadership elections =

The New Democratic Party of Prince Edward Island has held numerous leadership elections in its history.

== 2002 ==
Candidate	Votes	%
Gary Robichaud	60	73.17
Ken Bingham	18	21.95
Deborah Kelly-Hawkes	4	4.88
Spoiled Ballots	0	0.00
Totals	82	100

== 2006 ==
Candidate	Votes	%
Dean Constable	29	60.47
Mike Desroches	19	39.58
Spoiled Ballots	0	0.00
Totals	48	100

== 2009 ==
The party's leadership convention on April 4, 2009, was not competitive, but directly ratified interim leader James Rodd as the party's new permanent leader.

== 2012 ==
Held October 13, 2012.

Candidate	Votes	%
Mike Redmond	152	84.44
Trevor Leclerc	28	15.56
Spoiled Ballots	0	0.00
Totals	180	100

== 2018 ==
Held April 7, 2018.

- Joe Byrne is elected with 57 percent of the vote and 123 votes.

== 2022 ==
Originally scheduled for November 6, 2021, the leadership vote was held April 23, 2022. The lone candidate, Michelle Neill, was elected.

== 2026 ==
Held February 7, 2026, following Michelle Neill's resignation as party leader, on October 25, 2025. The lone candidate, Thomas Burleigh, was elected unanimously.
