= Charlottetown-Belvedere =

Provincial electoral district in Prince Edward Island, Canada

Prince Edward Island electoral district

Provincial electoral district
- Legislature: Legislative Assembly of Prince Edward Island
MLA
Susie Dillon
Progressive Conservative
- District created: 2019
- First contested: 2019
- Last contested: 2023

Charlottetown-Belvedere (District 11) is a provincial electoral district for the Legislative Assembly of Prince Edward Island, Canada. The district was contested for the first time in the 2019 Prince Edward Island general election.

== Members ==
The riding has elected the following members of the Legislative Assembly:

Members of the Legislative Assembly for Charlottetown-Belvedere
| Assembly | Years | Member | Party |
|---|---|---|---|
| 66th | 2019–2023 | Hannah Bell | Green |
| 67th | 2023–present | Susie Dillon | Progressive Conservative |

== Election results ==
2023 Prince Edward Island general election
| Party | Candidate | Votes | % | ±% |
|---|---|---|---|---|
| Progressive Conservative | Susie Dillon | 1,418 | 51.1 | +19.8 |
| Green | Joanna Morrison | 639 | 23.0 | -17.3 |
| Liberal | Marcia Carroll | 560 | 20.2 | -6.4 |
| New Democratic | Aidin Mousavian | 133 | 4.8 | +3.1 |
| Island | Jayne McAskill | 25 | 0.9 | |
| Total valid votes | | 2,775 | 100.0 | |
| Progressive Conservative gain from Green | | Swing | | +18.6 |

2019 Prince Edward Island general election
| Party | Candidate | Votes | % | ±% |
|---|---|---|---|---|
| Green | Hannah Bell | 1,286 | 40.40 | +5.20 |
| Progressive Conservative | Ronnie Carragher | 998 | 31.30 | +4.38 |
| Liberal | Roxanne Carter-Thompson | 846 | 26.60 | -1.90 |
| New Democratic | Trevor Leclerc | 55 | 1.7 | -7.98 |
| Total valid votes | | 3,185 | 100.00 | |
| Green hold | | Swing | | +4.79 |

== See also ==
- List of Prince Edward Island provincial electoral districts
- Canadian provincial electoral districts
