= Joe Byrne (Canadian politician) =

Canadian politician

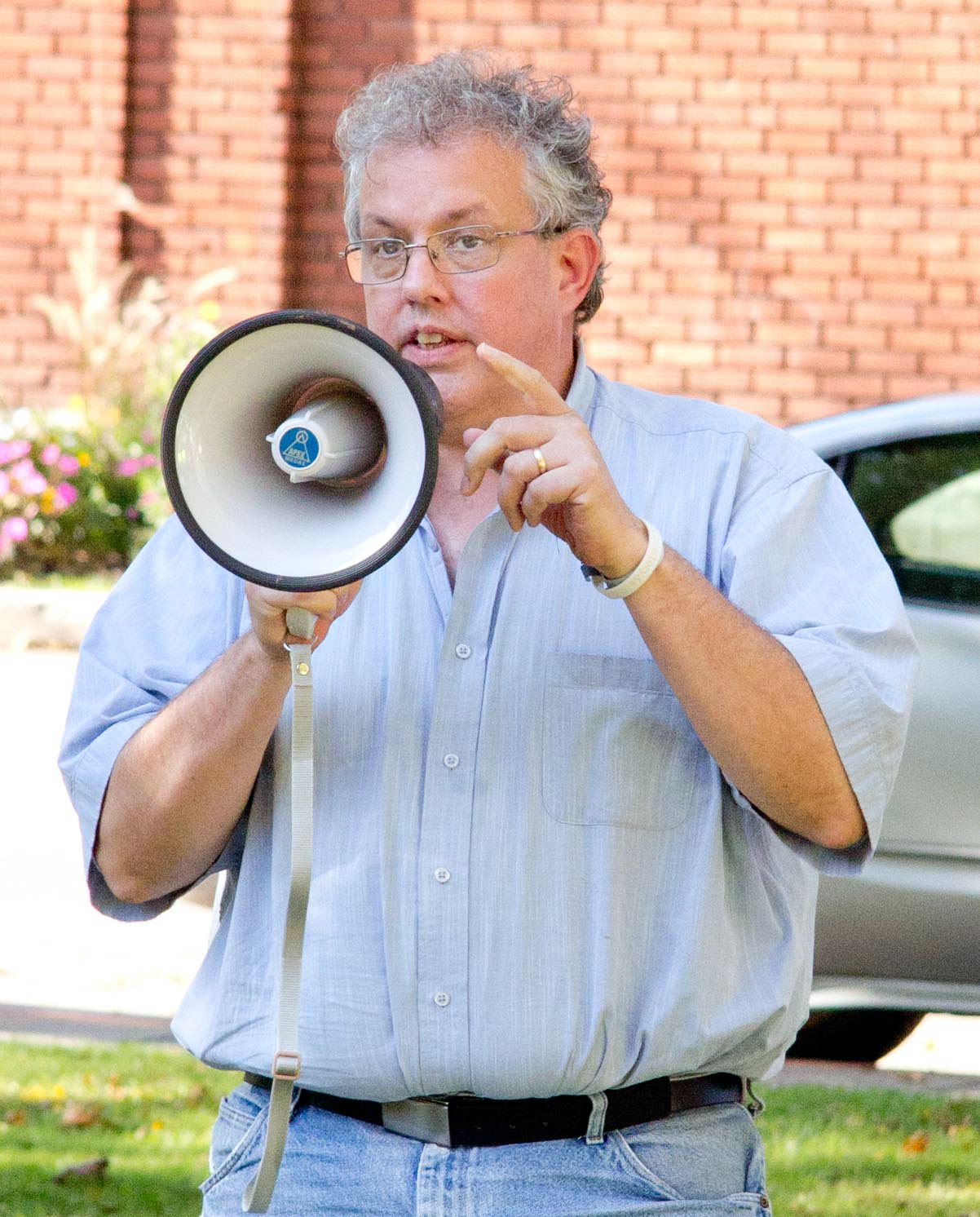

Leader of the New Democratic Party of Prince Edward Island
- In office April 7, 2018 – September 1, 2020
- Preceded by: Michael Redmond
- Succeeded by: Michelle Neill

Personal details
- Born: December 26, 1961 (age 64) Sept-Îles, Quebec
- Party: New Democratic Party
- Education: University of Prince Edward Island
- Profession: community outreach worker, administrator

Joe Byrne (born December 26, 1961) served as leader of the New Democratic Party of Prince Edward Island from 2018 to 2020. He became leader on April 7, 2018, after defeating two other candidates on the first ballot of the NDP leadership convention.

Previously, Byrne was the federal NDP candidate in Charlottetown riding in the 2011, 2015 and 2019 federal elections, placing second behind Liberal candidate Sean Casey in 2015, and fourth in 2019.

Byrne was a missionary in the Dominican Republic for seven years and then served as director of youth ministry at the Roman Catholic Diocese of Charlottetown for 12 years. Since 2010, he has been community connections supervisor with the PEI Association of Newcomers to Canada, where he has helped plan the annual ‘DiverseCity’ festival.

Byrne also contested the 2019 Prince Edward Island general election in District 12, Charlottetown-Victoria Park, losing to Green Party candidate Karla Bernard. Byrne resigned as PEI NDP leader effective September 1, 2020.

At the time of the 2025 Canadian federal election, he lived in Charlottetown.

== Electoral record ==
2025 Canadian federal election: Charlottetown
Party	Candidate	Votes	%	±%	Expenditures
Liberal	Sean Casey	13,656	64.75	+18.05	$102,175.93
Conservative	Natalie Jameson	6,139	29.11	−1.95	$103,634.18
New Democratic	Joe Byrne	906	4.30	−6.42	$9,651.86
Green	Daniel Cousins	257	1.22	−8.37	$0.00
People's	Robert Lucas	131	0.62	−1.31	$1,794.70
Total valid votes/expense limit		21,089	99.00	+0.03	$106,504.98
Total rejected ballots		214	1.00	–0.03	
Turnout		21,303	76.59	+6.12	
Eligible voters		27,814			
Liberal notional hold		Swing		+10.00	
Source: Elections Canada
Note: number of eligible voters does not include voting day registrations.

2023 Prince Edward Island general election: Charlottetown-Victoria Park
Party	Candidate	Votes	%	±%
Green	Karla Bernard	1,052	42.0	+1.5
Progressive Conservative	Tim Keizer	978	39.0	+18.2
Liberal	Barb MacLeod	293	11.7	-16.2
New Democratic	Joe Byrne	150	6.0	-4.8
Island	Danni Moher	32	1.3	
Total valid votes		2,505	100.0	
Green hold		Swing		-4.8

2019 Prince Edward Island general election: Charlottetown-Victoria Park
Party	Candidate	Votes	%	±%	Expenditures
Green	Karla Bernard	1,272	40.5	+21.7	$5,713.87
Liberal	Richard Brown	875	27.9	-11.5	$8,745.20
Progressive Conservative	Tim Keizer	656	20.9	-6.6	$8,352.69
New Democratic	Joe Byrne	338	10.8	-3.6	$20,244.92
Total valid votes/expense limit		3,141	99.5		$11,564.28
Rejected ballots		17	0.5		
Turnout		3,158	74.55	−6.1	
Eligible voters		4,236			
Green gain from Liberal		Swing		+14.4	
Source: Elections PEI

2019 Canadian federal election: Charlottetown
Party	Candidate	Votes	%	±%	Expenditures
Liberal	Sean Casey	8,812	44.26	−12.01	$81,859.21
Green	Darcie Lanthier	4,648	23.35	+17.57	$36,415.23
Conservative	Robert A. Campbell	4,040	20.29	+5.47	$46,459.01
New Democratic	Joe Byrne	2,238	11.24	−11.90	$4,819.38
Christian Heritage	Fred MacLeod	172	0.86	New	$1,200.90
Total valid votes/expense limit		19,910	100.0		$86,542.92
Total rejected ballots		274	1.36	+0.89	
Turnout		20,184	73.45	−2.14	
Eligible voters		27,480			
Liberal hold		Swing		−14.79	
Source: Elections Canada

2015 Canadian federal election: Charlottetown
Party	Candidate	Votes	%	±%	Expenditures
Liberal	Sean Casey	11,910	56.27	+16.79	$133,567.53
New Democratic	Joe Byrne	4,897	23.14	–1.94	$51,147.58
Conservative	Ron MacMillan	3,136	14.82	–17.89	$73,560.00
Green	Becka Viau	1,222	5.77	+3.51	$5,912.52
Total valid votes/expense limit		21,165	99.53		$170,107.74
Total rejected ballots		99	0.47	–0.14	
Turnout		21,264	76.24	+6.14	
Eligible voters		27,891			
Liberal hold		Swing		+9.36	
Source: Elections Canada

2011 Canadian federal election: Charlottetown
Party	Candidate	Votes	%	±%	Expenditures
Liberal	Sean Casey	7,292	39.48	-10.58	$61,465.09
Conservative	Donna Profit	6,040	32.71	+0.60	$48,556.35
New Democratic	Joe Byrne	4,632	25.08	+12.77	$45,026.11
Green	Eliza Knockwood	417	2.26	-2.57	$2,301.92
Christian Heritage	Baird Judson	87	0.47	-0.23	$3,159.86
Total valid votes/expense limit		18,468	100.0	–	$69,664.10
Total rejected ballots		113	0.61	-0.16	
Turnout		18,581	70.10	+3.96	
Eligible voters		26,507			
Liberal hold		Swing		-5.59	
