= Charlottetown (electoral district) =

Federal electoral district in Prince Edward Island, Canada

Prince Edward Island electoral district
- Interactive map of riding boundaries from the 2025 federal election
- Coordinates: 46.260°N 63.134°W

Federal electoral district
- Legislature: House of Commons
MP
Sean Casey
Liberal
- District created: 2003
- First contested: 2004
- Last contested: 2025
- District webpage: profile, map

Demographics
- Population (2021): 38,809
- Electors (2025): 27,662
- Area (km²): 46
- Pop. density (per km²): 843.7
- Census division: Queens
- Census subdivision: Charlottetown

Charlottetown is a federal electoral district in Prince Edward Island, Canada, that has been represented in the House of Commons of Canada since 2004. The district, which includes the entire City of Charlottetown, has an area of 46 km^{2} and a population of 34,562 as of 2011.

Formerly known as Hillsborough, it was formed in 1966 from the old Queen's district, and elected its first MP in 1968. It was redrawn and renamed Charlottetown in 2003.

Following the 2022 Canadian federal electoral redistribution, the riding gained territory newly annexed by the City of Charlottetown in the Marshfield area from the adjacent Malpeque riding. This change came into effect upon the calling for the 2025 Canadian federal election.

== Demographics ==
According to the 2021 Canadian census, 2023 representation order

Languages: 81.1% English, 3.7% Mandarin, 2.6% French, 2.0% Punjabi, 1.7% Arabic, 1.2% Vietnamese
Race: 76.2% White, 6.3% South Asian, 5.0% Chinese, 2.9% Black 2.3% Arab, 2.0% Indigenous, 2.0% Southeast Asian, 1.2% Filipino
Religions: 57.6% Christian (28.9% Catholic, 6.7% United Church, 3.5% Presbyterian, 2.8% Anglican, 2.7% Baptist, 13.1% other), 3.4% Muslim, 2.3% Hindu, 1.7% Sikh, 33.0% none
Median income: $36,800 (2020)
Average income: $46,160 (2020)

== History ==
From 1966 until 2004, most of the Charlottetown riding was part of the riding of Hillsborough. In 2003, there was a riding readjustment; a part of the old Hillsborough riding became part of Cardigan. 96.4% of the riding of Charlottetown was previously part of the Hillsborough riding, and 3.6% was previously part of Malpeque. There were no boundary changes as a result of the 2012 federal electoral redistribution.

=== Member of Parliament ===
This riding has elected the following members of Parliament:

Parliament	Years	Member	Party
Hillsborough; Riding created from Queen's
28th	1968–1972	Heath MacQuarrie	Progressive Conservative
29th	1972–1974	Heath MacQuarrie	Progressive Conservative
30th	1974–1979	Heath MacQuarrie	Progressive Conservative
31st	1979–1980	Tom McMillan	Progressive Conservative
32nd	1980–1984	Tom McMillan	Progressive Conservative
33rd	1984–1988	Tom McMillan	Progressive Conservative
34th	1988–1993	George Proud	Liberal
35th	1993–1997	George Proud	Liberal
36th	1997–2000	George Proud	Liberal
37th	2000–2004	Shawn Murphy	Liberal
Charlottetown
38th	2004–2006	Shawn Murphy	Liberal
39th	2006–2008	Shawn Murphy	Liberal
40th	2008–2011	Shawn Murphy	Liberal
41st	2011–2015	Sean Casey	Liberal
42nd	2015–2019	Sean Casey	Liberal
43rd	2019–2021	Sean Casey	Liberal
44th	2021–2025	Sean Casey	Liberal
45th	2025–present	Sean Casey	Liberal

== Election results ==
=== Charlottetown ===
==== 2025 ====
2025 Canadian federal election
Party	Candidate	Votes	%	±%	Expenditures
Liberal	Sean Casey	13,656	64.75	+18.05	
Conservative	Natalie Jameson	6,139	29.11	−1.95	
New Democratic	Joe Byrne	906	4.30	−6.42	
Green	Daniel Cousins	257	1.22	−8.37	
People's	Robert Lucas	131	0.62	−1.31	
Total valid votes/expense limit		21,089	99.00		
Total rejected ballots		214	1.00		
Turnout		21,303	76.59		
Eligible voters		27,814			
Liberal notional hold		Swing		+10.00	
Source: Elections Canada
Note: number of eligible voters does not include voting day registrations.

==== 2021 ====
2021 Canadian federal election
Party	Candidate	Votes	%	±%	Expenditures
Liberal	Sean Casey	8,919	46.70	+2.44	$72,839.73
Conservative	Doug Currie	5,932	31.06	+10.77	$77,864.04
New Democratic	Margaret Andrade	2,048	10.72	-0.52	$3,242.50
Green	Darcie Lanthier	1,832	9.59	-13.75	none listed
People's	Scott McPhee	369	1.93	–	$0.00
Total valid votes/expense limit		19,100	98.97		$88,991.90
Total rejected ballots		198	1.03	-0.33	
Turnout		19,298	70.47	-2.34	
Eligible voters		27,383			
Liberal hold		Swing		-4.16	
Source: Elections Canada

==== 2019 ====
2019 Canadian federal election
Party	Candidate	Votes	%	±%	Expenditures
Liberal	Sean Casey	8,812	44.26	−12.01	$81,859.21
Green	Darcie Lanthier	4,648	23.35	+17.57	$36,415.23
Conservative	Robert A. Campbell	4,040	20.29	+5.47	$46,459.01
New Democratic	Joe Byrne	2,238	11.24	−11.90	$4,819.38
Christian Heritage	Fred MacLeod	172	0.86	New	$1,200.90
Total valid votes/expense limit		19,910	100.0		$86,542.92
Total rejected ballots		274	1.36	+0.89	
Turnout		20,184	73.45	−2.14	
Eligible voters		27,480			
Liberal hold		Swing		−14.79	
Source: Elections Canada

==== 2015 ====
2015 Canadian federal election: Charlottetown
Party	Candidate	Votes	%	±%	Expenditures
Liberal	Sean Casey	11,910	56.27	+16.79	$133,567.53
New Democratic	Joe Byrne	4,897	23.14	–1.94	$51,147.58
Conservative	Ron MacMillan	3,136	14.82	–17.89	$73,560.00
Green	Becka Viau	1,222	5.77	+3.51	$5,912.52
Total valid votes/expense limit		21,165	99.53		$170,107.74
Total rejected ballots		99	0.47	–0.14	
Turnout		21,264	76.24	+6.14	
Eligible voters		27,891			
Liberal hold		Swing		+9.36	
Source: Elections Canada

==== 2011 ====
2011 Canadian federal election: Charlottetown
Party	Candidate	Votes	%	±%	Expenditures
Liberal	Sean Casey	7,292	39.48	-10.58	$61,465.09
Conservative	Donna Profit	6,040	32.71	+0.60	$48,556.35
New Democratic	Joe Byrne	4,632	25.08	+12.77	$45,026.11
Green	Eliza Knockwood	417	2.26	-2.57	$2,301.92
Christian Heritage	Baird Judson	87	0.47	-0.23	$3,159.86
Total valid votes/expense limit		18,468	100.0	–	$69,664.10
Total rejected ballots		113	0.61	-0.16	
Turnout		18,581	70.10	+3.96	
Eligible voters		26,507			
Liberal hold		Swing		-5.59	

==== 2008 ====
2008 Canadian federal election
Party	Candidate	Votes	%	±%	Expenditures
Liberal	Shawn Murphy	8,893	50.06	-0.10	$66,093.14
Conservative	Tom DeBlois	5,704	32.11	-2.03	$48,302.66
New Democratic	Brian Pollard	2,187	12.31	+1.19	$4,744.42
Green	Laura Bisaillon	858	4.83	+1.76	$1,257.27
Christian Heritage	Baird Judson	124	0.70	+0.19	$8,750.00
Total valid votes/expense limit		17,776	100.0	–	$67,455
Total rejected, unmarked and declined ballots		137	0.77	+0.18	
Turnout		17,913	66.14	-4.61	
Eligible voters		27,083			
Liberal hold		Swing		+0.96	

==== 2006 ====
2006 Canadian federal election
Party	Candidate	Votes	%	±%	Expenditures
Liberal	Shawn Murphy	9,586	50.16	+0.80	$60,442.09
Conservative	Tom DeBlois	6,524	34.14	+6.59	$60,317.15
New Democratic	Brian Pollard	2,126	11.12	-7.32	$5,251.38
Green	David Daughton	586	3.07	-1.02	$780.62
Christian Heritage	Baird Judson	97	0.51	-0.05	$5,346.77
Total valid votes/expense limit		19,112	100.0	–	$62,665
Total rejected, unmarked and declined ballots		114	0.59	-0.12	
Turnout		19,226	70.75	+3.45	
Eligible voters		27,175			
Liberal hold		Swing		-2.90	

==== 2004 ====
2004 Canadian federal election
Party	Candidate	Votes	%	±%	Expenditures
Liberal	Shawn Murphy	9,175	49.36	+6.80	$59,677.46
Conservative	Darren Peters	5,121	27.55	-7.80	$60,605.56
New Democratic	Dody Crane	3,428	18.44	-2.91	$13,197.84
Green	Will McFadden	760	4.09	–	$1,647.47
Christian Heritage	Baird Judson	105	0.56	–	$2,837.13
Total valid votes/expense limit		18,589	100.0	–	$61,440
Total rejected, unmarked and declined ballots		133	0.71		
Turnout		18,722	67.30		
Eligible voters		27,820			
Liberal notional hold		Swing		+7.30	
Changes from 2000 are based on redistributed results. Change for the Conservatives is based on the combined total of the Progressive Conservatives and the Canadian Alliance.

2000 federal election redistributed results
Party	Vote	%
Liberal	7,427	42.56
Progressive Conservative	5,270	30.20
New Democratic	3,725	21.35
Alliance	899	5.15
Others	129	0.74

=== Hillsborough ===
==== 2000 ====
2000 Canadian federal election: Hillsborough
Party	Candidate	Votes	%
Liberal	Shawn Murphy	8,277	41.81
Progressive Conservative	Darren Peters	6,039	30.50
New Democratic	Dody Crane	4,328	21.86
Alliance	Gerry Stewart	1,005	5.08
Natural Law	Peter Cameron	92	0.46
Independent	Baird Judson	58	0.29
Turnout		19,895	67.2

==== 1997 ====
1997 Canadian federal election
Party	Candidate	Votes	%	±%
Liberal	George Proud	7,630	40.87	
New Democratic	Dody Crane	5,751	30.80	
Progressive Conservative	Mitchell Tweel	4,594	24.61	
Reform	Blaine Jensen	476	2.55	
Christian Heritage	Baird Judson	145	0.78	
Natural Law	Paula Price	74	0.40	
Turnout		18,847	71.2%	

==== 1993 ====
1993 Canadian federal election
Party	Candidate	Votes	%	±%
Liberal	George Proud	11,976	60.57	
Progressive Conservative	Thomas McMillan	5,269	26.65	
New Democratic	Dody Crane	1,143	5.78	
Reform	Freeman T. Whitty	744	3.76	
National	Dave Patterson	350	1.77	
Christian Heritage	Baird Judson	167	0.84	
Natural Law	Peter Cameron	123	0.62	

==== 1988 ====
1988 Canadian federal election
Party	Candidate	Votes	%	±%
Liberal	George Proud	8,897	43.68	
Progressive Conservative	Thomas McMillan	8,638	42.41	
New Democratic	Dody Crane	1,984	5.78	
Independent	David Weale	569	2.79	
Christian Heritage	Baird Judson	281	1.38	

==== 1984 ====
1984 Canadian federal election
Party	Candidate	Votes	%	±%
Progressive Conservative	Thomas McMillan	9,158	53.20	
Liberal	Gerry Birt	6,768	39.32	
New Democratic	David Burke	846	4.91	
Independent	Big John Muise	323	1.88	
Independent	Izzurd Goat McFadden	82	0.48	
Green	David Daughton	37	0.21	

==== 1980 ====
1980 Canadian federal election
Party	Candidate	Votes	%
Progressive Conservative	Thomas McMillan	7,128	47.66
Liberal	Gerry Birt	6,555	43.83
New Democratic	Bob Crockett	1,245	8.32
Marxist–Leninist	Kathryn Schmidt	28	0.19
lop.parl.ca

==== 1979 ====
1979 Canadian federal election
Party	Candidate	Votes	%	±%
Progressive Conservative	Thomas McMillan	8,338	54.99	
Liberal	Gordon Tweedy	5,319	35.08	
New Democratic	Bob Crockett	1,453	9.58	
Libertarian	Garry Anstett	54	0.36	

==== 1974 ====
1974 Canadian federal election
Party	Candidate	Votes	%	±%
Progressive Conservative	Heath MacQuarrie	9,917	50.36	
Liberal	George Chandler	8,577	43.56	
New Democratic	Preston MacLeod	1,197	6.08	
lop.parl.ca

==== 1972 ====
1972 Canadian federal election
Party	Candidate	Votes	%	±%
Progressive Conservative	Heath MacQuarrie	10,605	55.13	
Liberal	Ian Glass	7,168	37.26	
New Democratic	Etsel Ross	1,464	7.61	
Source: lop.parl.ca

==== 1968 ====
1968 Canadian federal election
Party	Candidate	Votes	%	±%
Progressive Conservative	Heath MacQuarrie	8,328	54.99	
Liberal	Jack McAndrew	6,447	41.05	
New Democratic	David Hall	930	5.92	

== Student vote results ==
In a student vote, participating Canadian schools to parallel the Canadian federal election results. The vote was designed to educate students and simulate the electoral process for persons who have not yet reached the legal majority. Schools with a large student body that reside in another electoral district had the option to vote for candidates outside of the electoral district then where they were physically located.

Graph of student vote election results in Charlottetown (minor parties that never got 2% of the vote or didn't run consistently are omitted) View source data.

=== 2019 ===
2019 Canadian federal election
Party	Candidate	Votes	%	±%
Liberal	Sean Casey	1,002	32.01	-9.52
Green	Darcie Lanthier	983	31.41	+7.7
Conservative	Robert Campell	536	17.12	+5.05
New Democratic	Joe Byrne	470	15.02	-7.66
Christian Heritage	Fred MacLeod	139	4.44	New
Total Valid Votes		3,130	100.0	
Source: Student Vote

=== 2015 ===
2015 Canadian federal election
Party	Candidate	Votes	%	±%
Liberal	Sean Casey	1,280	41.53	+13.3
Green	Becka Viau	731	23.72	+8.37
New Democratic	Joe Byrne	699	22.68	-7.24
Conservative	Ron MacMillan	372	12.07	-9.19
Total Valid Votes		3,082	100.0	

=== 2011 ===
2011 Canadian federal election
Party	Candidate	Votes	%
New Democratic	Joe Byrne	785	29.92
Liberal	Sean Casey	767	29.23
Conservative	Donna Profit	558	21.26
Green	Eliza Knockwood	402	15.32
Christian Heritage	Baird Judson	112	4.27
Total valid votes		2,624	100.00

== See also ==
- List of Canadian electoral districts
- Historical federal electoral districts of Canada
