= St. Nicholas, Prince Edward Island =

St. Nicholas
- Community
- Municipality of St. Nicholas
- St. Nicholas in Prince Edward Island
- Coordinates: 46.426°N 63.949°W
- Country: Canada
- Province: Prince Edward Island
- County: Prince
- Incorporated: 1991

Population (2011)
  - Total: 198
- Time zone: AST
  - Summer (DST): ADT
- Area code: 902
- Telephone Exchange: 887

St. Nicholas is a municipality that holds community status in Prince Edward Island, Canada. It was incorporated in 1991, and is located on Bedeque Bay in Prince County.

== Demographics ==
Federal census population history of St. Nicholas
| Year | Pop. | ±% |
|---|---|---|
| 2016 | 213 | — |
| 2021 | 218 | +2.3% |
Source: Statistics Canada

In the 2021 Census of Population conducted by Statistics Canada, St. Nicholas had a population of 218 living in 88 of its 107 total private dwellings, a change of 2.3% from its 2016 population of 213. With a land area of 20.73 km^{2} (8.00 sq mi), it had a population density of 10.5/km^{2} (27.2/sq mi) in 2021.

== See also ==
- List of communities in Prince Edward Island
