= Michael Redmond (politician) =

Michael (Mike) Redmond
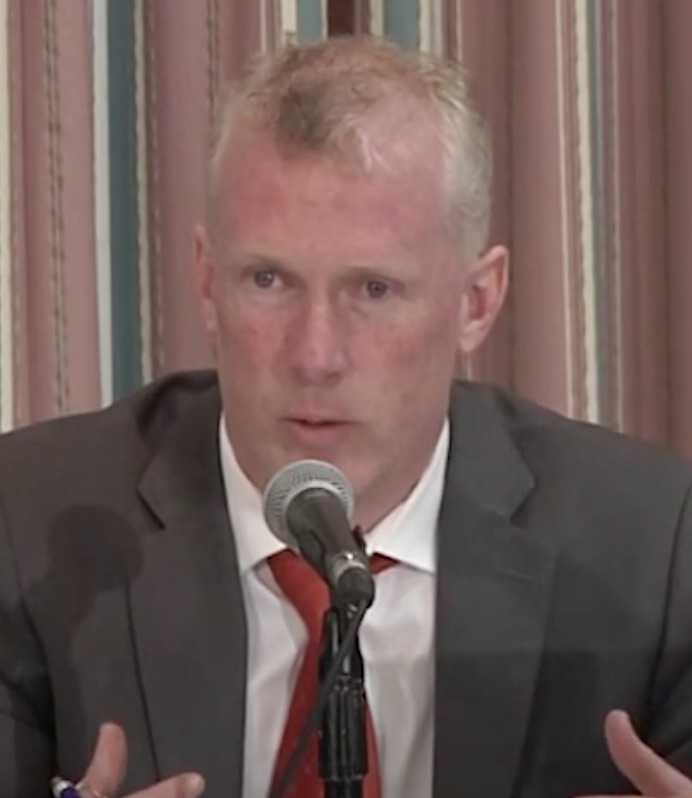

Leader of the New Democratic Party of Prince Edward Island
- In office October 13, 2012 – December 6, 2017
- Preceded by: James Rodd
- Succeeded by: Joe Byrne

Personal details
- Party: New Democratic Party
- Profession: facilities manager

Michael (Mike) Redmond is a Canadian politician, who was the leader of the New Democratic Party of Prince Edward Island from 2012 to 2017. A facilities director at the Murphy's Community Centre in Charlottetown, he won the leadership over activist Trevor Leclerc on October 13, 2012, following the resignation of James Rodd.

Under Redmond's leadership, the party — which has only ever elected one MLA, Herb Dickieson, to the Legislative Assembly of Prince Edward Island — saw significant increases in voter support, moving into second place in public opinion polls in 2013, ahead of the Prince Edward Island Progressive Conservative Party, for the first time in its history. However, this increase in popular support was not sustained, and Redmond and the NDP failed to win a seat in the 2015 provincial election. Redmond stood as the party's candidate in Montague-Kilmuir in that election, finishing in third place.

He announced his resignation as party leader in December 2017, after losing to Hannah Bell of the Prince Edward Island Green Party in the Charlottetown-Parkdale by-election on November 27.
