= 2011 in Canada =

- Decades: 1990s; 2000s; 2010s; 2020s
- See also: History of Canada; Timeline of Canadian history; List of years in Canada

Events from the year 2011 in Canada.

== Incumbents ==
=== Crown ===
- Monarch – Elizabeth II

=== Federal government ===
- Governor General – David Johnston
- Prime Minister – Stephen Harper
- Chief Justice – Beverley McLachlin (British Columbia)
- Parliament – 40th (until 26 March) then 41st (from June 2)

=== Provincial governments ===
==== Lieutenant governors ====
- Lieutenant Governor of Alberta – Donald Ethell
- Lieutenant Governor of British Columbia – Steven Point
- Lieutenant Governor of Manitoba – Philip S. Lee
- Lieutenant Governor of New Brunswick – Graydon Nicholas
- Lieutenant Governor of Newfoundland and Labrador – John Crosbie
- Lieutenant Governor of Nova Scotia – Mayann Francis
- Lieutenant Governor of Ontario – David Onley
- Lieutenant Governor of Prince Edward Island – Barbara Hagerman (until August 15), then Frank Lewis
- Lieutenant Governor of Quebec – Pierre Duchesne
- Lieutenant Governor of Saskatchewan – Gordon Barnhart

==== Premiers ====
- Premier of Alberta – Ed Stelmach (until October 7) then Alison Redford
- Premier of British Columbia – Gordon Campbell (until March 14) then Christy Clark
- Premier of Manitoba – Greg Selinger
- Premier of New Brunswick – David Alward
- Premier of Newfoundland and Labrador – Kathy Dunderdale
- Premier of Nova Scotia – Darrell Dexter
- Premier of Ontario – Dalton McGuinty
- Premier of Prince Edward Island – Robert Ghiz
- Premier of Quebec – Jean Charest
- Premier of Saskatchewan – Brad Wall

=== Territorial governments ===
==== Commissioners ====
- Commissioner of Yukon – Doug Phillips
- Commissioner of Northwest Territories – George Tuccaro
- Commissioner of Nunavut – Edna Elias

==== Premiers ====
- Premier of the Northwest Territories – Floyd Roland (until October 27) then Bob McLeod
- Premier of Nunavut – Eva Aariak
- Premier of Yukon – Dennis Fentie (until June 11) then Darrell Pasloski

== Events ==
=== January to March ===
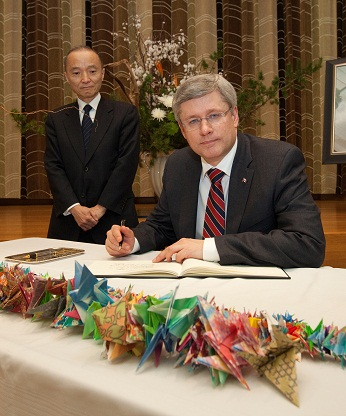
Canadian Prime Minister Stephen Harper visited the Japanese embassy in Ottawa, to sign a book of condolences for the victims of the Great East Japan earthquake and tsunami that have impacted the country, and he met with Japanese ambassador to Canada Kaoru Ishikawa (left), on March 23, 2011.

- January 1
  - The Quebec Sales Tax (QST) rises 1 percentage point to 8.5%.
  - Undergrounders novel, by Canadian author David Skuy is published.
- January 12 – A stolen snowplow leads Toronto police on a chase, crashing into several cars. Toronto police officer Sergeant Ryan Russell died and the alleged thief ended in hospital with gunshot wounds.
- January 18 – Close to 12,000 people, including many Ontario Provincial Police and Royal Canadian Mounted Police gather near the Metro Toronto Convention Centre for the funeral of Sergeant Ryan Russell.
- January 21 – Three people die, and hundreds lose power after a winter storm strikes the Maritime Provinces.
- January 24
  - Quebec goes through a cold snap and Hydro-Québec registers a record consumption of electricity reaching 38,200 megawatts at 7:30 am
  - The former Liberal MLA Dave Taylor announces he is joining the Alberta Party, becoming the party's first MLA.
- January 25 – Ed Stelmach announces he will retire from provincial politics before the next general election of the Legislative Assembly of Alberta.
- February 1 – A claim at the British Columbia Worker's Compensation Board results in the SPCA and RCMP opening an investigation into a massacre of approximately 100 sled dogs at a Whistler adventure service. See Whistler sled dog cull.
- February 8 – Nearly 1,500 government lawyers and crown prosecutors go on strike in Quebec, claiming to be overworked and underpaid.
- February 19 – An explosion ruptures the Trans-Canada Pipeline in Beardmore, Ontario, forcing the temporary evacuation of the community.
- February 26 – Cult leader and killer Roch Thériault is killed at Dorchester Penitentiary in Dorchester, New Brunswick.
- February 27 – Stephen Harper announces that Canada will place additional sanctions against Libya along with those originally announced by the UN, including asset freezes and a ban on financial transactions with the Libyan government.
- March 2
  - A wind storm off the coast of the British Columbia Lower Mainland brings wind gusts up to 140 kilometres per hour, knocking out power to 55,000 residents.
  - HMCS Charlottetown (FFH 339), with a crew of 240, steams to Libya, for humanitarian assistance and evacuation.
  - Dominic Cardy is chosen as the new leader of the New Democratic Party of New Brunswick.
- March 14 – Christy Clark is sworn in as premier of British Columbia, following a leadership election, causing British Columbia to become the first province with two female premiers, and the first time in Canadian history that three provinces or territories have simultaneously had female premiers (until October).
- March 19 – Prime Minister Stephen Harper, Foreign Affairs Minister Lawrence Cannon and Chief of the Defence Staff General Walt Natynczyk attend a meeting, in Paris, with leaders from France, Britain, the Arab League and the United Nations, to discuss the 2011 Libyan civil war.
- March 25 – Stephen Harper's Conservative government is defeated on a non-confidence vote by the opposition.

=== April to June ===
- April 12 – English-language debate for federal party leaders
- April 13 – French-language debate for federal party leaders
- April 15 – Liu Qian, a Chinese exchange student to York University is found undressed and murdered in her apartment.
- April 27 – The Premier of Yukon Dennis Fentie announces his retirement.
- May 2 – The 41st federal election is held with the Conservative Party winning a majority government, the NDP becoming the official opposition, both for the first time, and Green Party leader Elizabeth May wins in Saanich—Gulf Islands, the first seat for that party in the Canadian parliament.
- May 3 – Gilles Duceppe resigns as leader and president of the Bloc Québécois, and Vivian Barbot is named as the interim president.
- May 5 – The military arrives to aid with the flooding in Quebec caused by the Richelieu River overflowing its banks.
- May 15 – 16 – Wildfires destroy a large section of Slave Lake, Alberta, forcing 7,000 residents to evacuate.
- May 25 – Michael Ignatieff resigns as leader of the Liberal Party, and Bob Rae is chosen as interim leader.
- May 27 – A fire destroys an empty building, at 4057 Richmond Road and owned by the National Capital Commission.
- June 2
  - Canada Post workers begin a rotating strike across the country after contract talks fall through.
  - The 41st Parliament convenes.
- June 3 – Senate Page Brigette DePape interrupts the Speech from the Throne, with her silent protest.
- June 6 – 120th anniversary of the death of John Alexander Macdonald.
- June 11 – Darrell Pasloski is sworn in as premier of Yukon, following the Yukon Party leadership election.
- June 15
  - Canada Post locks out the Canadian Union of Postal Workers in a labour dispute.
  - Riots break out in Downtown Vancouver after the Vancouver Canucks lose game 7 of the 2011 Stanley Cup Finals to the Boston Bruins.
- June 21 – Following the merger of their U.S. parent services in 2010, the satellite radio providers Sirius Canada and XM Radio Canada complete their own merger into SiriusXM Canada.

=== July to September ===
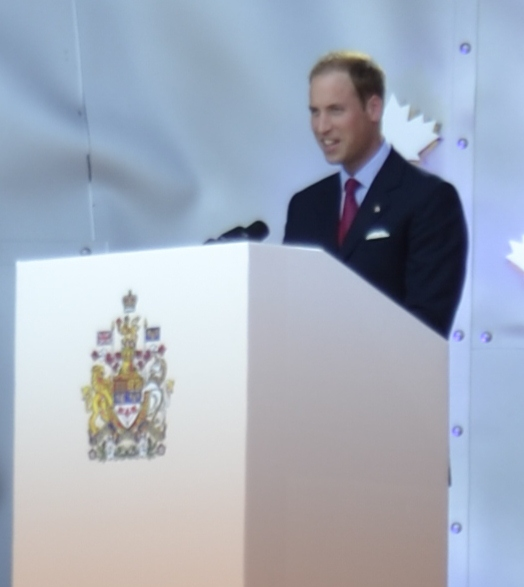
The Duke of Cambridge speaks at Canada Day festivities in Ottawa

- June 13 – August 5 – 2011 British Columbia sales tax referendum – The mail-in referendum was delayed due in part to the Canada Post lockout.
- June 30 – July 7 – The Duke and Duchess of Cambridge (Prince William and Catherine) tour Canada
- July 1 – Face of Canada, an art exhibition in Vancouver is showcased.
- July 6 – Steve Cardiff, Yukon MLA for Mount Lorne killed in a two-vehicle road accident, one kilometre north of Lewes Lake on the South Klondike Highway, involving a tractor trailer and a small vehicle.
- July 21 – A heat wave across Eastern Canada peaks with temperatures reaching as high as 37.1 degrees Celsius (humidex: 51 degrees Celsius) in Toronto, Ontario.
- July 22 – Montreal city officials report at least 10 heatwave-related deaths.
- July 25 – Leader of the Opposition, Jack Layton takes a medical leave of absence, and Nycole Turmel is appointed interim leader of the New Democratic Party.
- August 13 – The federal government extends trade, travel and assets sanctions against Syria, in response to the oppression of anti-government protests.
- August 14 – A massive shooting occurs outside a casino in Kelowna, British Columbia, killing one and injuring four others, including a Hell's Angels member. Jonathan Bacon, one of the Bacon Brothers and one of the most notorious gangsters in British Columbia suspected to have been with the Red Scorpions, is the only one killed in the shooting.
- August 15 – Frank Lewis becomes Lieutenant Governor of Prince Edward Island, replacing Barbara Hagerman
- August 16 – Maritime Command, Land Force Command and Air Command are renamed to the Royal Canadian Navy, the Canadian Army, and the Royal Canadian Air Force, respectively.
- August 20 – First Air Flight 6560 crashes near Resolute Bay killing 12 people and injuring 3 others.
- August 21 – A powerful F3 tornado sweeps through Goderich, killing one man and causing substantial damage.
- August 22 – Jack Layton, 61, the Leader of the Opposition and Leader of the NDP dies of cancer. The flag atop the Peace Tower, as well as federal buildings in Toronto, fly their flags at half-mast.
- August 23 – An earthquake, originating in the American state of Virginia, is felt in areas across the country from Sudbury, Ontario to Fredericton, New Brunswick. There were no injuries nor damage in Canada.
- August 24 – A severe thunderstorm passed through Southern Ontario, causing a significant number of damage. Severe Thunderstorm Watches were issued for parts of Southern Ontario.
- August 27
  - A state funeral is held for Jack Layton.
  - The CN Tower is illuminated in orange, the colour of Layton's NDP, overnight.
- September 3 – The first of two antiquities is stolen from the Montreal Museum of Fine Arts
- September 22 – A float plane crashes into a street in Yellowknife killing both pilots on board.
- September – The Tutte Institute for Mathematics and Computing is given its current name.

=== October to December ===
- October 3
  - 2011 Prince Edward Island general election
  - 2011 Northwest Territories general election
- October 4 – 2011 Manitoba general election
- October 6 – 2011 Ontario general election
- October 7 – Alison Redford is sworn in as premier of Alberta, following a leadership election, becoming Alberta's first female premier, and the first time in Canadian history that four provinces or territories have simultaneously had female premiers (until September 2012).
- October 11
  - 2011 Newfoundland and Labrador general election
  - 2011 Yukon general election
- October 26 – Bob McLeod becomes premier of Northwest Territories, replacing Floyd Roland.
- October 27 – A plane crash occurs outside of Vancouver International Airport after failing to land there. 11 people are injured as a result, and one person, the pilot, is killed.
- November 7 – 2011 Saskatchewan general election
- December 5 – Edmonton East MP Peter Goldring voluntarily leaves the Conservative caucus after being charged with refusing to provide a breath sample at a traffic stop.
- December 11 – Daniel Paillé is elected new leader of the Bloc Québécois.
- December 15 – Claresholm highway massacre: A mass shooting leaves three people dead, including two members of the Lethbridge Bulls baseball team, in a triple murder-suicide north of Claresholm, Alberta.

== Arts and literature ==
=== Film ===
- The Girl in the White Coat

== Sport ==
- February 19 – 27: Scotties Tournament of Hearts – Charlottetown, PEI
- February 20: 2011 Heritage Classic – Calgary, Alberta
- March 5 – 13: Tim Hortons Brier – London, Ontario
- May 29 - Saint John Sea Dogs win their first Memorial Cup by defeating Mississauga St. Michael's Majors 3 to 1. The tournament was played at the Hershey Centre in Mississauga, Ontario
- June 10 – 12: 2011 Canadian Grand Prix – Montreal, Quebec
- June 15 - Boston Bruins win their sixth (and first since 1972) Stanley Cup by defeating the Vancouver Canucks 4 games to 3. The deciding Game 7 was played at Rogers Arena in Vancouver. Shortly before the Canucks' defeat, the 2011 Vancouver Stanley Cup riot broke out.
- July 22 – 25: RBC Canadian Open – Vancouver, BC
- November 26 - McMaster Marauders win their first Vanier Cup by defeating the Laval Rouge et Or 41 to 38 in the 47th Vanier Cup played at BC Place Stadium in Vancouver
- November 27 - BC Lions win their sixth Grey Cup by defeating the Winnipeg Blue Bombers in the 99th Grey Cup played at BC Place Stadium in Vancouver
- December 26 – January 5, 2012: 2012 World Junior Ice Hockey Championships – Calgary and Edmonton, Alberta

== Deaths in 2011 ==
=== January ===
- January 1 – Bruce Halliday, 84, physician and politician, MP for Oxford (1974–1993) (b. 1926)
- January 8 – Peter Donaldson, 57, actor (b. 1952)
- January 11 -Riley Johnson, 16, ON, Oshawa, (b. 2002)
- January 11 – Marcel Trudel, 93, historian (b. 1917)
- January 13 – Alex Kirst, 47, drummer (Iggy Pop, The Nymphs) (b. 1963)
- January 17
  - Keith Davey, 84, politician and campaign organizer, Senator for York, Ontario (1966–1996) (b. 1926)
  - Robert W. Mackenzie, 82, politician, MPP for Hamilton East (1975–1995) (b. 1928)
- January 18 – Antonín Kubálek, pianist (b. 1935)
- January 19
  - Ernest McCulloch, 84, haematologist, pioneer of stem cell science. (b. 1926)
  - Jose Kusugak, 60, Inuit leader, bladder cancer. (b. 1950)
- January 21 – Herb Gray, 76, football player (Winnipeg Blue Bombers) (b. 1934)
- January 22
  - René Piché, 79, politician (b. 1931)
  - Lois Smith, 81, dancer (National Ballet of Canada). (b. 1929)
- January 24
  - Chief White Eagle, 93, Mohawk tribal leader, actor and stuntman (b. 1917)
  - Jack Matheson, 86, sports journalist (b. 1924)
- January 25 – Audrey Best, 50, lawyer, ex-wife of politician and lawyer Lucien Bouchard, breast cancer (b. 1960)
- January 28 – Megan McNeil, 20, singer, cancer. (b. 1990)

=== February ===
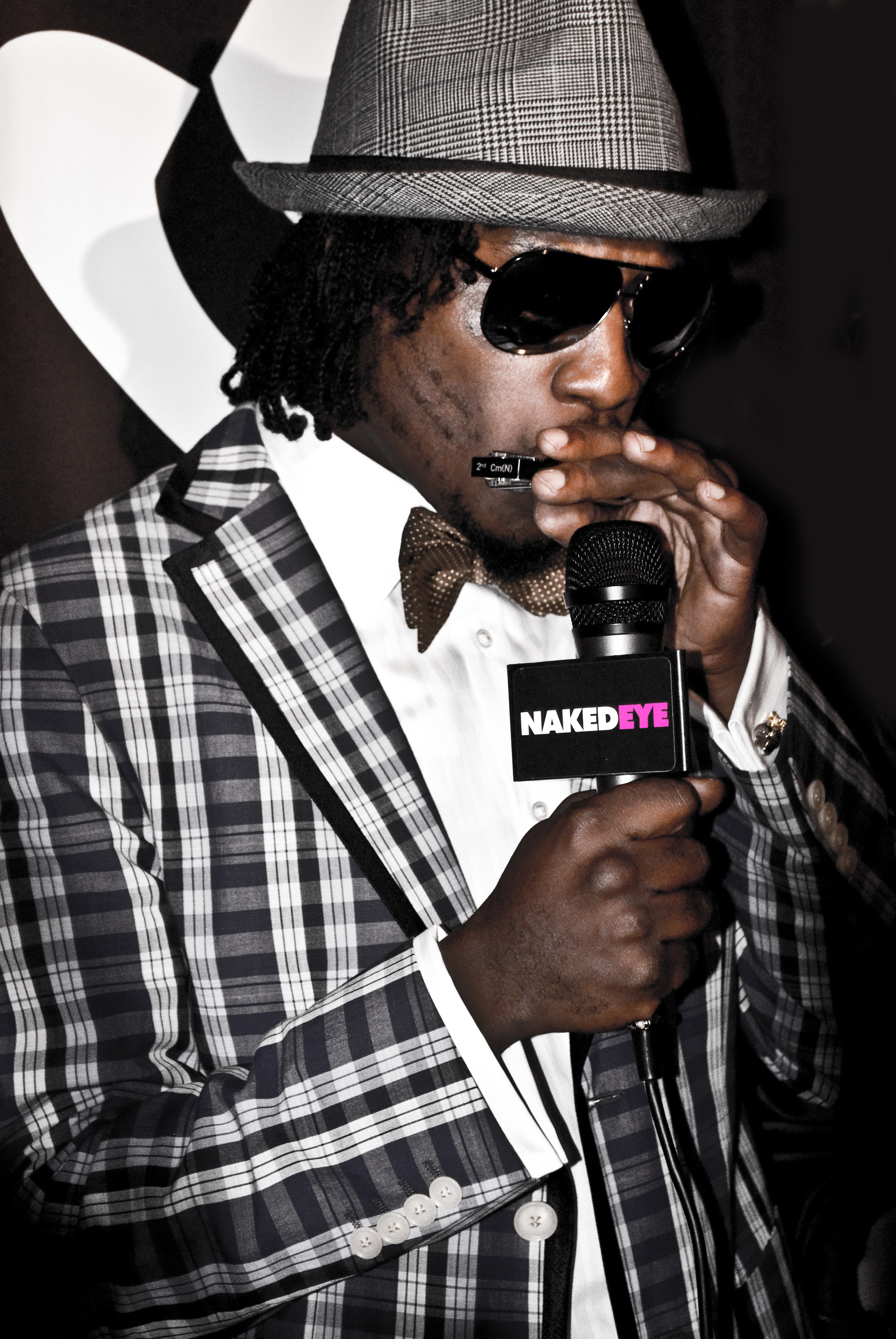
Bad News Brown in Montreal 2010

- February 2 – Eric Nicol, 91, writer (b. 1919)
- February 3 – Ron Piché, 75, baseball player (Braves, Angels, Cardinals), cancer (b. 1935)
- February 10 – Fred Speck, 63, hockey player (b. 1947)
- February 11 – Bad News Brown, 33, rapper and harmonica player, beaten and shot. (b. 1977)
- February 18 – Cayle Chernin, 63, actress (Goin' Down the Road), cancer. (b. 1947)
- February 22 – Jud McAtee, 91, hockey player (b. 1920)
- February 24 – Robert Reguly, 80, journalist (Toronto Star), heart disease (b. 1931)
- February 26 – Roch Thériault, 63, cult leader and convicted murderer (b. 1947)
- February 28 – Allan Williams, 88, politician, Attorney General of British Columbia (1979–1983), after long illness (b. 1922)

=== March ===
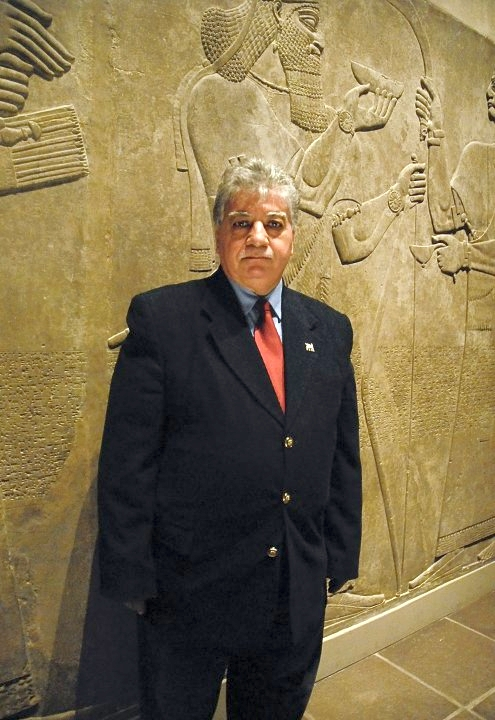
Donny George Youkhanna in the Metropolitan Museum of Art

- March 3
  - May Cutler, 87, founder of Tundra Books and first female Mayor of Westmount, Quebec (b. 1924)
  - James Travers, 62, Toronto Star journalist (b. 1948)
- March 6 – Marie Andrée Bertrand, 85, criminologist, feminist and anti-prohibitionist (b. 1925)
- March 8 – Bronko Nagurski Jr., 73, football player (Hamilton Tiger-Cats) (b. 1937)
- March 10 – Nick Harbaruk, 67, hockey player (b. 1943)
- March 11 – Donny George Youkhanna, 60, archaeologist, anthropologist and author (b. 1950)
- March 12
  - Olive Dickason, 91, historian and author (b. 1920)
  - Donald Brenner, 64, judge, Chief Justice of the British Columbia Supreme Court (2000–2009) (b. 1947)
- March 13 – Rick Martin, 59, ice hockey player (Buffalo Sabres, Los Angeles Kings) (b. 1951)
- March 14
  - Bruce Campbell, 87, Edmonton alderman (b. 1923)
  - G. Alan Marlatt, 69, professor, kidney failure (b. 1941)
  - Larry Zolf, 76, journalist (b. 1934)
- March 18 – Kirk Wipper, 87, professor and founder of the Canadian Canoe Museum (b. 1923)
- March 22
  - Victor Bouchard, 84, pianist, duettist (1952–2003) with Renée Morisset, respiratory disease (b. 1926)
  - Jean-Guy Morissette, 73, ice hockey goaltender (b. 1937)
- March 23 – Frank Howard, 85, politician, member of the BC Legislative Assembly for Skeena (1953–1956; 1979–1986) and MP for Skeena (1957–1974) (b. 1925)
- March 24 – Dudley Laws, 76, Jamaican-born civil rights activist, kidney disease (b. 1934)
- March 27 – Roger Abbott, 64, actor, writer and co-founder of the Royal Canadian Air Farce (b. 1946)
- March 29 – Neil Reimer, 88, politician, Leader of the Alberta New Democratic Party (1962–1968) (b. 1921)

=== April ===
- April 2 – James McNulty, 92, politician, MP for Lincoln (1962–1968) and St. Catharines (1968–1972). (b. 1918)
- April 3
  - Mandi Schwartz, 23, college ice hockey player (b. 1988)
  - John A. Tory, 81, lawyer and corporate executive (b. 1930)
- April 4 – Wayne Robson, 64, actor (b. 1946)
- April 6 – John Bottomley, 50, singer-songwriter, suicide (b. 1960)
- April 7
  - Pierre Gauvreau, 88, painter (b. 1922)
  - E. J. McGuire, 58, ice hockey coach and scout, cancer (b. 1952)
- April 12 – Sidney Harman, 92, businessman and publisher (Newsweek) (b. 1918)
- April 14 – Jean Gratton, 86, Roman Catholic prelate, Bishop of Mont-Laurier (1978–2001) (b. 1924)
- April 15 – Reno Bertoia, 76, Italian-born baseball player (Detroit Tigers), lymphoma (b. 1935)
- April 16
  - Allan Blakeney, 85, politician, premier of Saskatchewan (1971–1982), liver cancer (b. 1925)
  - Serge LeClerc, 61, ex-criminal, former politician (b. 1950)
  - Ulla Ryghe, 75, Swedish film editor, National Film Board of Canada worker
- April 17
  - Michael Sarrazin, 70, actor (b. 1940)
  - Victor Ward, 87, pilot, survivor of the 1956 Springhill Mine disaster, after long illness (b. 1924)
- April 21 – Ken Kostick, 57, cooking show host (What's for Dinner?), complications of pancreatitis (b. 1953)

=== May ===
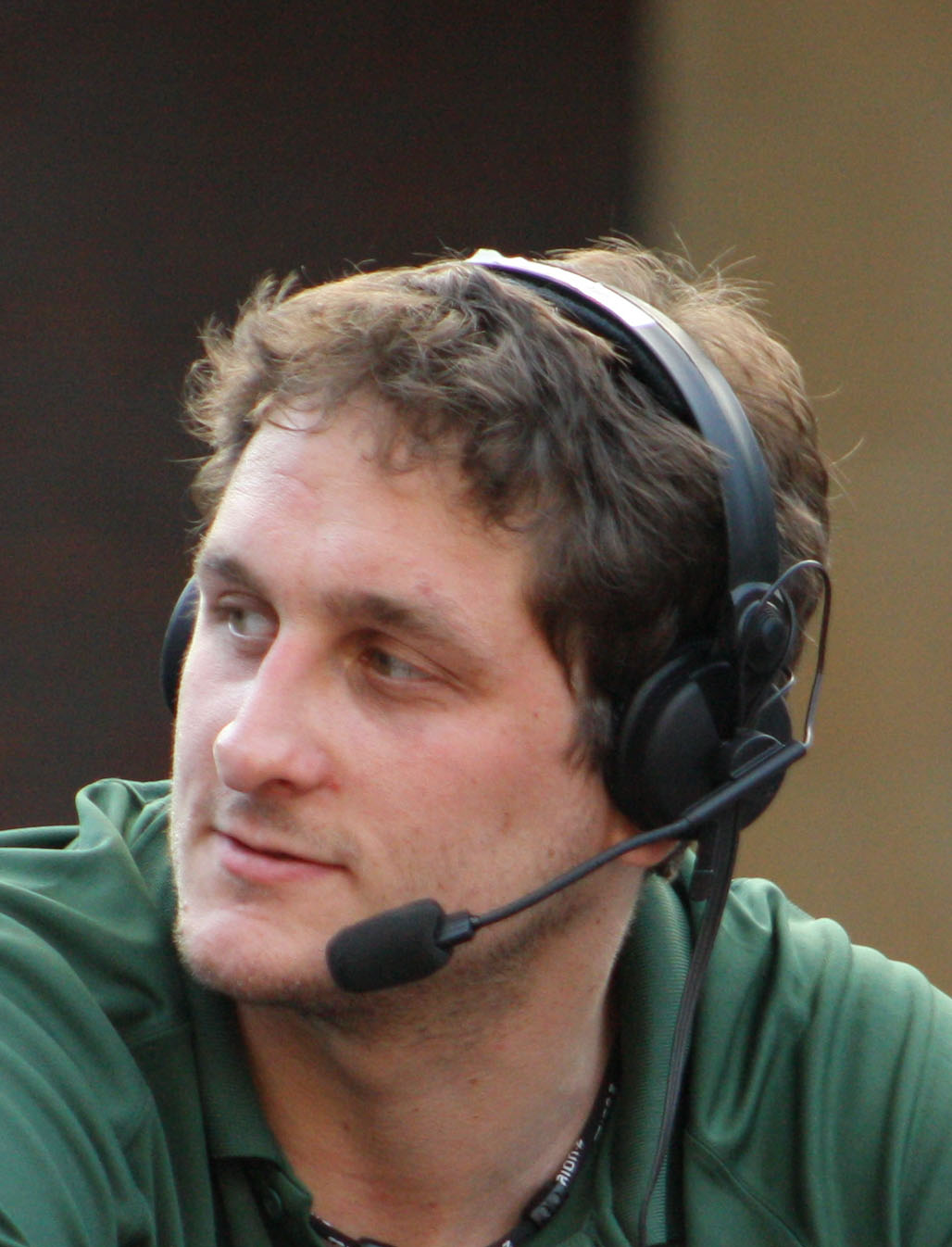
Derek Boogaard, hockey player

- May 2 – Danny Kassap, 28, Congolese-born long-distance runner (b. 1982).
- May 3 – Richie Hubbard, 78, politician (b. 1932).
- May 7 – Willard Boyle, 86, physicist (b. 1924).
- May 8 – Hilton Rosemarin, 58, set decorator (Three Men and a Baby, Cocktail, Jumper), brain cancer (b. 1952).
- May 13
  - Derek Boogaard, 28, hockey player (Wild, Rangers). (b. 1982).
  - Wallace McCain, 81, businessman, co-founder of McCain Foods, pancreatic cancer. (b. 1930).
  - Jack Richardson, 81, record producer (The Guess Who) (b. 1929).
- May 18 – John Fortino, 61, Italian-born businessman, founder of the Fortinos supermarket chain, cancer (b. 1950).
- May 19 – David H. Kelley, 87, American-born archaeologist (b. 1924).
- May 24 – Barry Potomski, 38, ice hockey player (b. 1972).
- May 28
  - Bill Harris, 79, baseball player (Brooklyn/Los Angeles Dodgers) (b. 1931).
  - Alys Robi, 88, jazz singer (b. 1923).

=== June ===
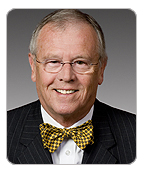
Bruce Crozier

- June 2 – Joel Rosenberg, 57, science fiction author, heart attack (b. 1954).
- June 3 – Bruce Crozier, 72, politician, Ontario MPP for Essex South (1993–1999) and Essex (since 1999), aortic aneurysm (b. 1938).
- June 8 – Paul Massie, 78, BAFTA-winning actor and theater professor (b. 1932).
- June 10 – Theo Dubois, 100, rower (b. 1911).
- June 12 – René Audet, 91, Roman Catholic prelate, Bishop of Joliette (1968–1990) (b. 1920).
- June 16 – Betty Fox, 71, cancer research activist, mother of Marathon of Hope starter Terry Fox (b. 1940).
- June 19 – John Kerr, Sr., 67, Scottish-born soccer player (b. 1943).
- June 21 – Robert Kroetsch, 83, poet and novelist (b. 1927).
- June 22 – Harley Hotchkiss, 83, businessman, member of Hockey Hall of Fame, prostate cancer (b. 1927).
- June 23 – Gaye Delorme, 64, musician, heart attack (b. 1947).
- June 26 – Barry Wilkins, 64, hockey player (Vancouver Canucks), lung cancer (b. 1947).

=== July ===
- July 4 – Wes Covington, 79, American-born baseball player (Milwaukee Braves, Kansas City Athletics, Philadelphia Phillies), cancer. (b. 1932)
- July 5
  - Malcolm Forsyth, 74, South African-born trombonist and composer, pancreatic cancer. (b. 1936)
  - Gordon Tootoosis 69, actor and activist, pneumonia. (b. 1941)
- July 6 – Steve Cardiff, 53, Yukon NDP MLA for Mount Lorne, road accident. (b. 1957)
- July 7
  - Peter Aucoin, 67, professor of political science and public administration (Dalhousie University). (b. 1943)
  - Paul-André Crépeau, 85, legal academic. (b. 1926)
- July 8 – Aleksis Dreimanis, 96, Latvian-born geologist. (b. 1914)
- July 10
  - Pierrette Alarie, 89, soprano, wife of tenor Léopold Simoneau. (b. 1921)
  - Lee Vines, 92, television announcer (What's My Line?) and actor, complications from a fall and pneumonia. (b. 1919)
- July 18 – Albert Driedger, 75, politician, stroke. (b. 1936)
- July 20 – Gloria Sawai, 78, author. (b. 1932)
- July 21 – Elwy Yost, 86, television host and writer. (b. 1925)
- July 22 – Brian Vallée, 70, author, journalist and documentary producer. (b. 1940)
- July 24 – Paul Marchand, 74, Roman Catholic prelate, Bishop of Timmins (since 1999). (b. 1937)

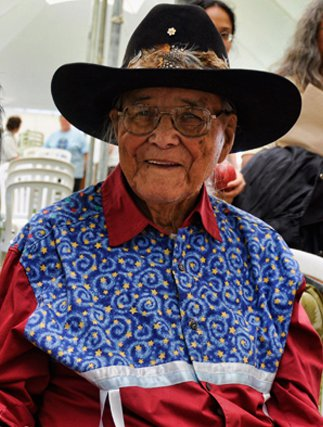
William Commanda, OC

- July 26 – Silvio Narizzano, 84, film and television director. (b. 1927)
- July 27
  - Wilfred Arsenault, 57, Prince Edward Island MLA. (b 1953)
  - Francis John Spence, 85, Roman Catholic prelate, Archbishop of Kingston (1982–2002). (b. 1926)

=== August ===
- August 2 – Jeanne Landry, 89, composer, pianist and teacher (b. 1922)
- August 3 – William Commanda, 97, former Algonquin chief near Maniwaki, Quebec, spiritual leader and Order of Canada recipient. (b. 1913)
- August 7 – Jiří Traxler, 99, Czech-born jazz pianist. (b. 1912)
- August 8 – Royal Copeland, 86, football player (Toronto Argonauts), Alzheimer's disease. (b. 1924)
- August 9 – Wendy Babcock, 32, advocate for the rights of prostitutes, suspected suicide. (b. 1978 or 1979)

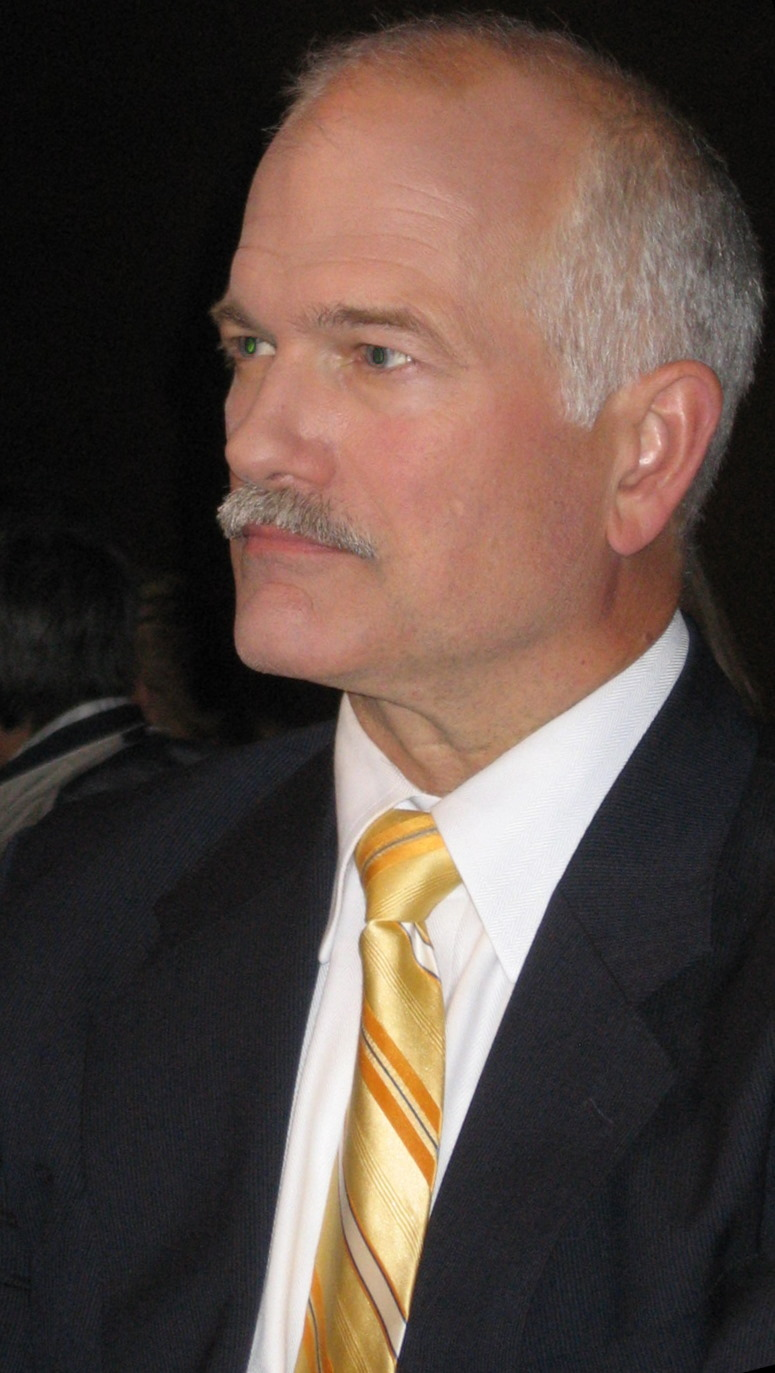
Jack Layton

- August 12 – Austin-Emile Burke, 89, Roman Catholic prelate, Archbishop of Halifax (1991–1998). (b. 1922)
- August 14 – Shawn Tompkins, 37, kickboxer and mixed martial artist. (b. 1974)
- August 15 – Rick Rypien, 27, ice hockey player (Vancouver Canucks). (b. 1984)
- August 18 – Simon De Jong, 69, politician, MP for Regina East (1979–1988) and Regina—Qu'Appelle (1988–1997), leukemia. (b. 1942)
- August 19 – Gil Courtemanche, 68, journalist and novelist (Un dimanche à la piscine à Kigali), cancer. (b. 1943)
- August 22 – Jack Layton, 61, politician, leader of New Democratic Party (2003–2011) and Leader of the Official Opposition (2011), cancer. (b. 1950)
- August 26 – Aloysius Ambrozic, 81, Slovenian-born Roman Catholic cardinal, Archbishop of Toronto (1990–2006). (b. 1930)
- August 31
  - Wade Belak, 35, ice hockey player (Toronto Maple Leafs, Nashville Predators). (b. 1976)
  - Robert Muir, 91, politician, MP and Senator. (b. 1919)

=== September ===
- September 3 – Edgar Benson, 88, politician and diplomat. (b. 1923)
- September 7 – Brad McCrimmon, 52, professional ice hockey defenceman (b. 1959)
- September 9 – William Lesick, 88, politician, MP for Edmonton East (1984–1988) (b. 1923)
- September 10 – Cecil Marshall, 71, Trinidadian-born cricketer (b. 1939)
- September 13 – Paul Gallant, 67, entrepreneur, inventor of Puzz-3D, cancer (b. 1944)
- September 14 – Buddy Tinsley, 87, football player (Winnipeg Blue Bombers) (b. 1924)
- September 15
  - Frances Bay, 92, character actress (Happy Gilmore, Blue Velvet, The Middle), died in Tarzana, California (b. 1919)
  - Mo Rothman, 92, movie executive, persuaded Charlie Chaplin to return to the United States, Parkinson's disease (b. 1919)
- September 16 – Roger Belanger, 45, ice hockey player, heart attack (b. 1965)
- September 27 – Joseph Maraachli, 1, infant with Leigh's disease (b. 2010)
- September 28 – Pierre Dansereau, 99, ecologist (b. 1911)
- September 30
  - Clifford Olson, 71, serial killer, cancer (b. 1940)
  - Ralph M. Steinman, 68, immunologist, announced as 2011 Nobel Laureate in Medicine, pancreatic cancer, died in New York City, U.S. (b. 1943)

=== October ===
- October 2 – Cindy Shatto, 54, Olympic diver, lung cancer (b. 1957)
- October 9
  - Rob Buckman, 63, British-born oncologist and comedian (b. 1948)
  - James Worrall, 97, Olympic athlete (1936) and administrator (b. 1914)
- October 13 – Barbara Kent, 103, silent film actress (b. 1907)
- October 14 – Reg Alcock, 63, politician, minister, MP for Winnipeg South (1993–2006); President of the Treasury Board (2003–2006), heart attack (b. 1948)
- October 15 – Earl McRae, 69, journalist (Ottawa Sun), apparent heart attack (b. 1942)
- October 17 – Barney Danson, 90, politician and soldier (b. 1921)
- October 18 – Tommy Grant, 76, football player (Hamilton Tiger-Cats) (b. 1935)
- October 19 – Tadeusz Sawicz, 97, Polish-born World War II fighter pilot (b. 1914)
- October 20 – Maria Rika Maniates, 74, musicologist (b. 1937)
- October 23 – Tillie Taylor, 88, judge (b. 1922)
- October 24 – Harold Huskilson, 91, politician, member of the Nova Scotia House of Assembly (1970–1993) (b. 1920)
- October 30 – Serge Aubry, 69, ice hockey player (Quebec Nordiques), diabetes (b. 1942)

=== November ===
- November 6 – Hickstead, 15, Dutch-born Canadian show jumping horse, Olympic champion (2008), ruptured aorta (b. 1996)
- November 11 – Choiseul Henriquez, 51, Haitian-born politician (b. 1950)
- November 12 – Jim Sullivan, 43, curler, world junior champion (1988) (b. 1968)
- November 15 – Thomas Worrall Kent, 89, journalist and public servant, cardiac arrest (b. 1922)
- November 16
  - James Fraser Mustard, 84, doctor and early childhood educator, cancer (b. 1927)
  - Eddy Palchak, 71, ice hockey trainer and equipment manager (b. 1940)
- November 19
  - Francis Cabot, 86, gardener and horticulturist (b. 1925)
  - Gordon S. Clinton, 91, politician, Mayor of Seattle (1956–1964) (b. 1920)
  - John Neville, 86, British-born actor (The Adventures of Baron Munchausen, The X-Files), Alzheimer's disease, died in Toronto, Ontario (b. 1925)
- November 20
  - Frank Leonard Brooks, 100, British-born artist (b. 1911)
  - Barry Steers, 85, Ambassador to Brazil and Japan, first Canadian Commissioner to Bermuda (b. c. 1926)
- November 21
  - Albert D. Cohen, 97, businessman (b. 1914)
  - Hal Patterson, 79, American-born player of football (Montreal Alouettes, Hamilton Tiger-Cats) (b. 1932)
- November 24 –
  - Salvatore Montagna, 40, mobster, shot (b. 1970 or 1971)
  - Helen Forrester, 92, British-born writer (b. 1919)
- November 25
  - Jean Casselman Wadds, 91, politician, MP for Grenville—Dundas (1958–1968); High Commissioner to the United Kingdom (1979–1983) (b. 1920)
  - John Edzerza, 63, politician, Yukon MLA for McIntyre-Takhini (2002–2011), leukemia (b. 1948)
  - Fred Etcher, 79, Olympic silver medal-winning (1960) ice hockey player (b. 1932)
- November 26 – Ed Harrington, 70, American-born football player (Toronto Argonauts), cancer (b. 1941)

=== December ===
- December 3 – Louky Bersianik, 81, novelist (b. 1930)
- December 6 – Sum Ying Fung, 112, supercentenarian, oldest person in Canada at time of death, natural causes (b. 1899)
- December 14 – Karl-Heinrich von Groddeck, 75, Olympic rower, gold medalist (1960) (b. 1936)
- December 18 – Jean Boucher, politician (b. 1926)
- December 19 – Evans Knowles, 97, politician (b. 1914)
- December 21
  - Ernest A. Watkinson, 99, politician (b. 1912)
  - David Gold, 31, musician (Woods of Ypres), car accident (b. 1980)
- December 22
  - Michael von Grünau, 67, psychologist and neurophysiologist (b. 1944)
- December 24 – Lex Gigeroff, 49, writer, actor and producer (Lexx), heart attack (b. 1962)
- December 27 – Johnny Wilson, 82, ice hockey player and coach (Detroit Red Wings) (b. 1929)
- December 30 – Doug Sellars, 50, television executive (Fox Sports Media Group, CBC Sports), heart attack (b. 1951)

== See also ==
- 2011 in Canadian music
- 2011 in Canadian television
- List of Canadian films of 2011
