= Cynthia Tucker =

Cynthia Tucker may refer to:

- Cynthia Delores Tucker (1927-2005), American politician and civil right activist
- Cynthia Tucker (politician) (born 1954), Canadian politician in Yukon
- Cynthia Tucker (journalist) (born 1955), American journalist
