= William H. West (entertainer) =

American entertainer

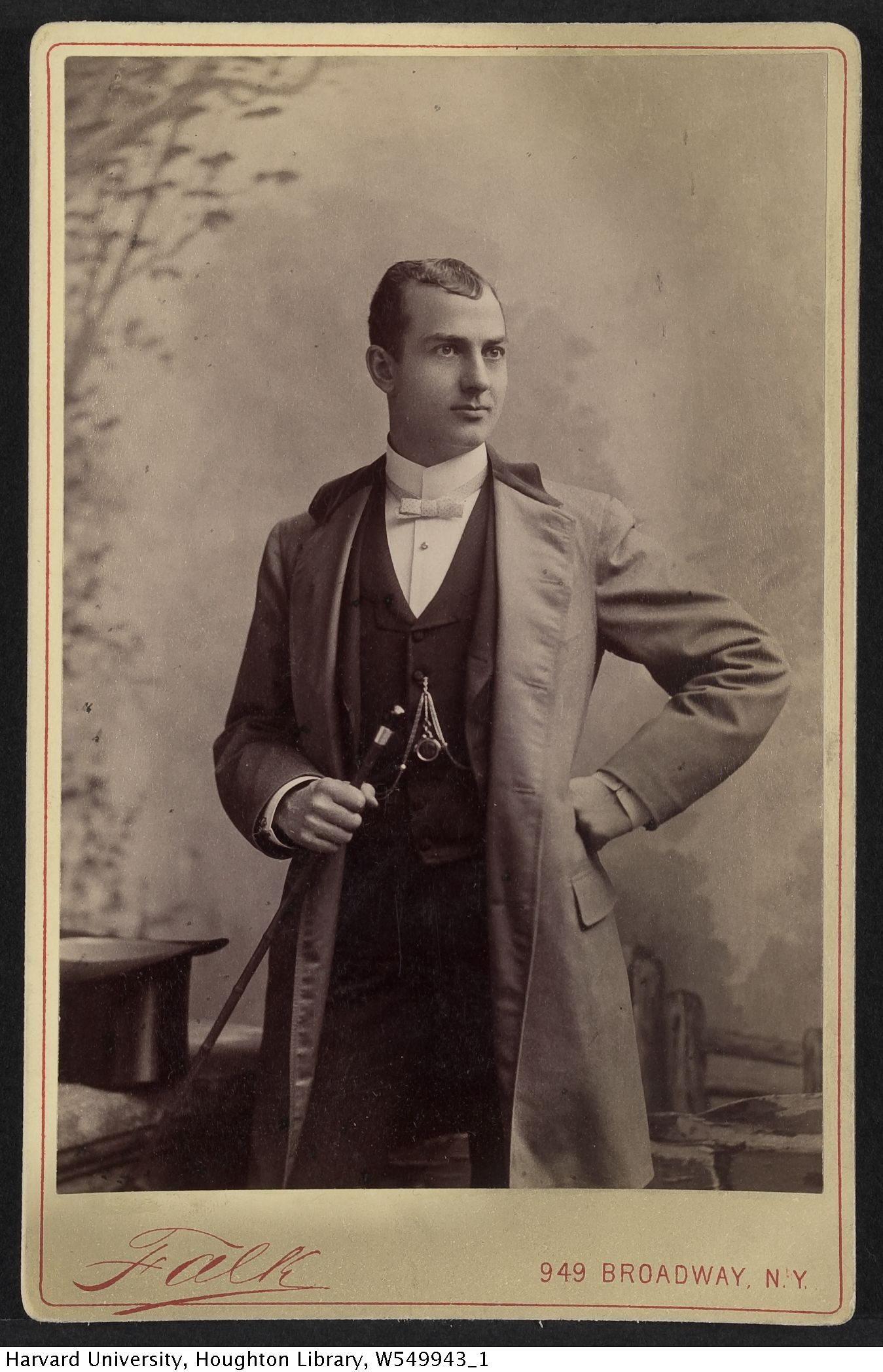
- Born: William Flynn; June 18, 1853; Syracuse, New York, U.S.
- Died: February 15, 1902 (aged 48); Chicago, Illinois, U.S.
- Other names: Billy West
- Occupation: Actor
- Known for: Minstrel shows
- Spouse(s): Fay Templeton (m. 1883; div. 1886) Rumelia "Lizette" Morris (m. 1887; died 1891) May Lucy DeWitt (m. 1891; div. 1892) Emma Hanley (m. 1892)
- Children: 1

William H. West (born William Flynn, June 18, 1853 – February 15, 1902) was an American blackface performer.

== Biography ==
West was born on June 18, 1853, in Syracuse, New York.

He often produced and played minstrel shows with George H. Primrose, first with a minstrel troupe owned by J. H. Haverly, and later in a show known as Primrose and West starring entertainers Milt G. Barlow and George Wilson, under the management of Henry J. Sayers.

Primrose and West had a hit, and they came to be called "The Millionaires of Minstrelsy". He became the sole producer of the supposedly Richest and Costliest Minstrel Organization in Existence: West's Big Minstrel Jubilee, which featured some of the leading performers of the day, always ending with the cast, in blackface, singing songs of the period.

West was married four times. His brides were:

- Fay Templeton, married 1883–1886, divorced;
- Rumelia "Lizette" Morris, married Jul 1887 to Jan 1891 (her death);
- May Lucy DeWitt, married 1891 to 1892. One child, son DeWitt Ezra West (1892–1975), was born from this union;
- Emma Hanley, married Oct 1892 to Feb 1902 (his death).

With the exception of Lizette Morris, all of the wives of West appeared on stage with him in various productions throughout the US.

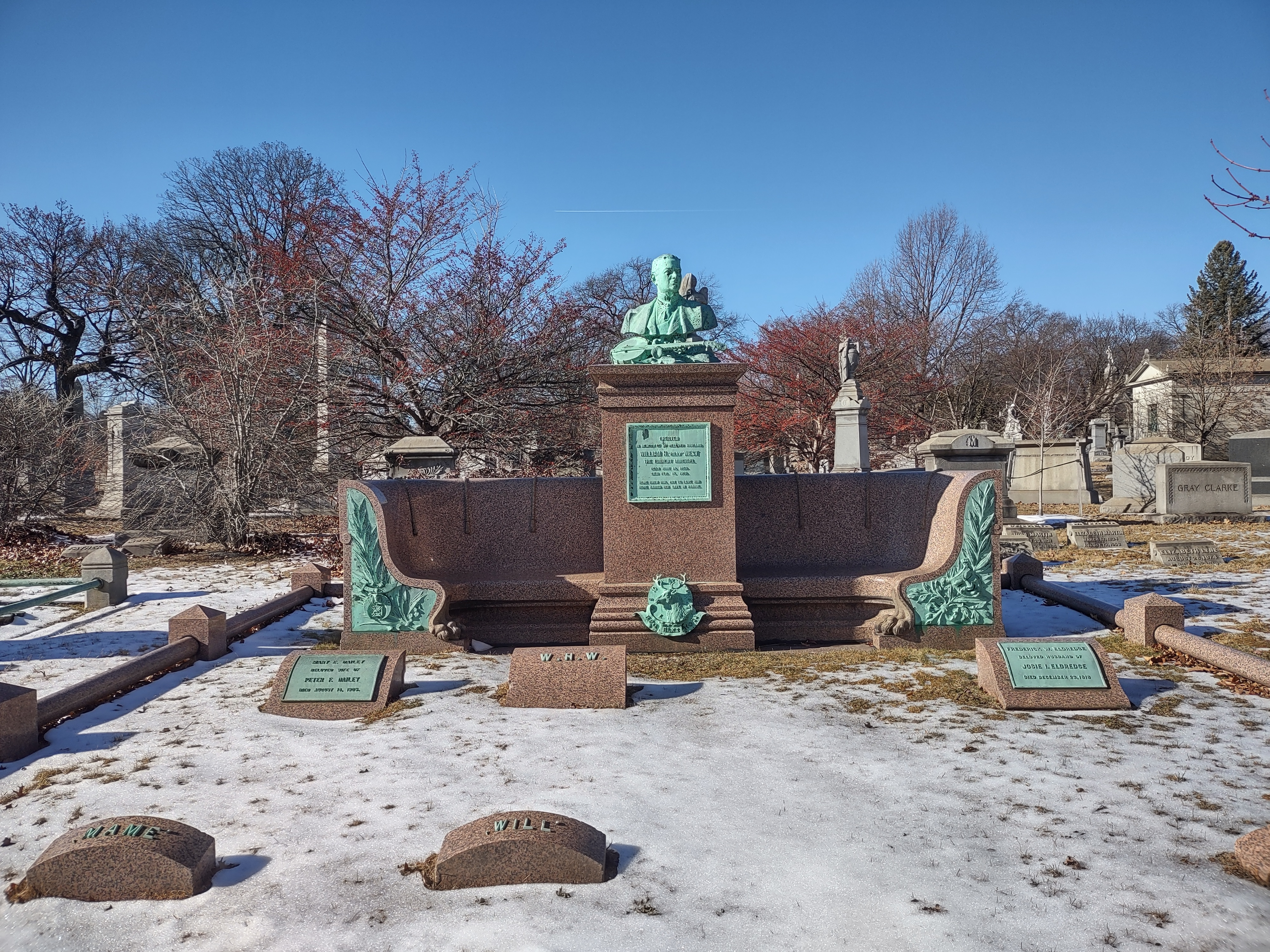
Grave in Brooklyn

He died on February 15, 1902 in Chicago of cancer. He was buried at Green-Wood Cemetery in Brooklyn, New York. On his grave marker are the words "None knew him but to love him. None named him save in praise."
