= Lois Moorcroft =

Canadian politician

Minister of Justice Minister of Education
- In office 1996–2000
- Preceded by: ?
- Succeeded by: Pam Buckway; Dale Eftoda

Member of the Legislative assembly of Yukon for Copperbelt South
- In office October 11, 2011 – November 7, 2016
- Preceded by: Constituency established
- Succeeded by: Scott Kent

Member of the Legislative Assembly of Yukon for Mount Lorne
- In office October 19, 1992 – April 17, 2000
- Preceded by: Constituency established
- Succeeded by: Cynthia Tucker

Personal details
- Born: August 21, 1954 (age 71) Oshawa, Ontario
- Party: New Democratic
- Occupation: Politician; Librarian

Lois Moorcroft (born August 21, 1954) is a Canadian politician, who represented the electoral districts of Mount Lorne (1992–2000) and Copperbelt South (2011–2016) in the Yukon Legislative Assembly. She is a member of the Yukon New Democratic Party.

== Early career ==
Moorcroft was born in Oshawa, Ontario, and grew up in Whitby, Ontario. She studied history at Trent University in Peterborough where she earned a bachelor's degree.

Prior to entering territorial politics, Moorcroft served as a librarian at Yukon College's Whitehorse campus. She also served on the Yukon Employment Standards Board and has held positions on the boards of the Yukon College Employees' Union and the Yukon Federation of Labour. In the 1980s, Moorcroft was one of the parents involved in successfully lobbying the territorial government for a new school (Golden Horn Elementary School) to be built for families and children living south of Whitehorse.

== Political career ==
=== 28th Legislative Assembly ===
Moorcroft was narrowly elected in the 1992 Yukon election as the representative for Mount Lorne for New Democrats. Moorcroft had campaigned on pay equality for women and the importance of the Canadian Human Rights Act.

In that election, however, the government of New Democrat leader Tony Penikett was defeated and reduced to Official Opposition status by a coalition of Yukon Party and Independent MLAs. As an opposition member, Moorcroft served on the Standing Committee on Rules, Elections, and Privileges.

=== 29th Legislative Assembly ===
Moorcroft was re-elected comfortably in the 1996 Yukon election, defeating Yukon Liberal leader Ken Taylor in her riding of Mount Lorne. The New Democrats, now led by Piers McDonald, formed a majority government. Moorcroft was appointed Minister of Justice, Minister of Education, and Minister responsible for the Women's Directorate in the McDonald government. It was during Moorcroft's tenure as Education minister that the community school in Old Crow burned down for the second time in 20 years.

Moorcroft was defeated in the 2000 Yukon election by Liberal candidate Cynthia Tucker, when the Yukon Liberal Party swept the City of Whitehorse to form a majority government. After this defeat, she served on the Yukon Electoral District Boundaries Commission and the Yukon Human Rights Commission.

=== 33rd Legislative Assembly ===
After a decade outside politics, Moorcroft announced her intent to seek the New Democrat nomination during the 2011 Yukon election in the newly constituted riding of Copperbelt South, which included much of her former riding of Mount Lorne. Moorcroft was narrowly successful, defeating Yukon Party candidate Val Boxall by just three votes. Her victory was confirmed in a recount.

Moorcroft joined the New Democrats under leader Liz Hanson in forming Official Opposition during the 33rd Legislative Assembly and served as opposition critic for Justice, Highways and Public Works, and Advanced Education. She was also caucus whip.

During the 33rd Legislative Assembly, Moorcroft took a stance against the Yukon Government's proposal to invest $200 million twinning the Alaska Highway through Whitehorse and opposed any fracking in the territory as a member of the Select Committee on Hydraulic Fracturing. Moorcroft also successfully put forward a motion, adopted unanimously, to make territorial campgrounds more accessible.

Moorcroft was once again defeated when seeking re-election, this time in the 2016 Yukon general election. She finished a distant third behind Yukon Party Cabinet minister Scott Kent and Liberal candidate and city councillor Jocelyn Curteanu. Moorcroft was one of four New Democrats to lose their seats on election night as part of the party's worst showing since 1978.

== Post-political career ==
After her second political defeat, Moorcroft was appointed the Returning Officer for the Liard First Nation, situated near Watson Lake, Yukon. The First Nation had failed to hold an election for its chief and council, whose terms had expired in December 2016. However, in March 2017, it was revealed that Moorcroft had abruptly resigned her position without reason, citing her confidentiality clause. Her resignation put election efforts on hold for the First Nation and led to speculation about her departure.

== Personal life ==
Moorcroft has lived in the Yukon for more than 40 years, with her husband. She holds a master of education degree in multidisciplinary leadership from University of Northern British Columbia and is enrolled, as of 2024, in the doctoral program in OISE at University of Toronto, focusing on social and environmental justice in Yukon communities.

== Electoral record ==
=== 2016 general election ===
Copperbelt South
Party	Candidate	Votes	%	±%
Yukon Party	Scott Kent	449	36.9%	-4.8%
Liberal	Jocelyn Curteanu	425	34.9%	+18.6%
NDP	Lois Moorcroft	331	27.2%	-14.8%
Green	Philippe LeBlond	12	1.0%	+1.0%
Total		1217	100.0%	–

=== 2011 general election ===
Copperbelt South
Party	Candidate	Votes	%	±%
NDP	Lois Moorcroft	397	42.0%	–
Yukon Party	Valerie Boxall	394	41.7%	–
Liberal	Colleen Wirth	154	16.3%	–
Total		945	100.0%	–

=== 2000 general election ===
Mount Lorne
Party	Candidate	Votes	%	±%
Liberal	Cynthia Tucker	563	44.9%	+19.9%
NDP	Lois Moorcroft	422	33.7%	-6.8%
Yukon Party	Ken Gabb	269	21.4%	+0.8%
Total		1254	100.0%	–

=== 1996 general election ===
Mount Lorne
Party	Candidate	Votes	%	±%
NDP	Lois Moorcroft	484	40.5%	+5.7%
Liberal	Ken Taylor	299	25.0%	+15.2%
Yukon Party	Allan Doherty	247	20.6%	-12.6%
Independent	Allen Luheck	166	13.9%	-8.3%
Total		1196	100.0%	–

=== 1992 general election ===
Mount Lorne
Party	Candidate	Votes	%	±%
NDP	Lois Moorcroft	316	34.8%	–
Yukon Party	Chuck Walker	302	33.2%	–
Independent	Barb Harris	202	22.2%	–
Liberal	Roger Moore	89	9.8%	–
Total		909	100.0%	–
