= George H. Primrose =

American minstrel performer (1852–1919)

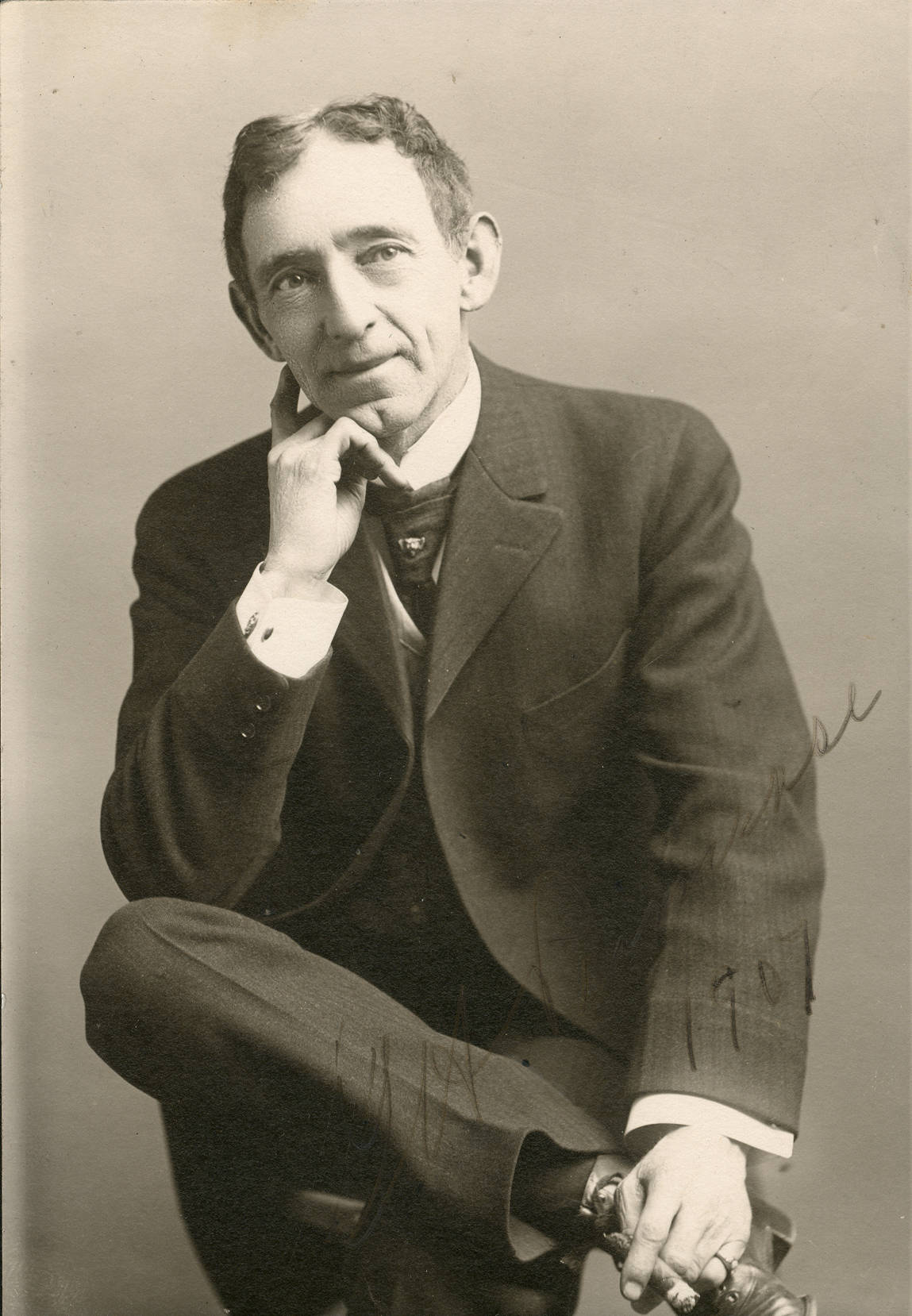
- George Primrose in 1907
- Born: George Primrose; November 12, 1852; London, Canada West
- Died: July 23, 1919 (aged 66); San Diego, California, U.S.
- Occupations: Dancer; minstrel performer
- Years active: 1867–1918
- Spouse(s): Emily Catlin, Esther Nerney, Viola Katherine Trueblood

George H. Primrose (November 12, 1852 – July 23, 1919) was a Canadian and American entertainer who was a minstrel performer in vaudeville. He was one half of the duo of Primrose and West with William H. West.

== Early life and family ==
Primrose was born in London, Canada West, of Irish and English ancestry. Some sources give his birth name as George H. Delaney, or George Delaney Primrose, but neither name seems supported by official records.

== Career ==
He began his career in 1867 with McFarland's Minstrels in Detroit, Michigan, billed as "Master Georgie, the Infant Clog Dancer", and later joined several other minstrel troupes. In 1871, he linked up in a duo with Bobby McGown, but the partnership was short-lived and the following year he paired with William H. West. They worked together in minstrel shows until 1882, when they established Thatcher, Primrose and West's Minstrels. Between 1889 and 1898, Primrose and West's Minstrels performed in vaudeville, until Primrose formed a new working partnership with Lew Dockstader.

His first wife, Emily Catlin, died in Chicago, Illinois in 1903. He married Esther Nerney of San Francisco, California in Mount Vernon, New York on April 23, 1904. From 1903 until 1918, shortly before his death, Primrose headed his own minstrel company in vaudeville, and continued to perform himself, in 1918 leading a group of seven men in blackface performing songs, dance and comedy. Described as "one of America's great blackface minstrels and a popular favorite on the vaudeville stage", a reviewer in Variety referred to him at the age of 66 as "the greatest soft shoe dancer in the world".

Primrose wed for the third time to his secretary, Viola Katherine Trueblood, on April 15, 1916. He died in San Diego, California on July 23, 1919.
