= A. J. Goddard =

Klondike Gold Rush era sternwheeler that sank in a storm on Lake Laberge

Coordinates: 61.0259°N 135.1191°W

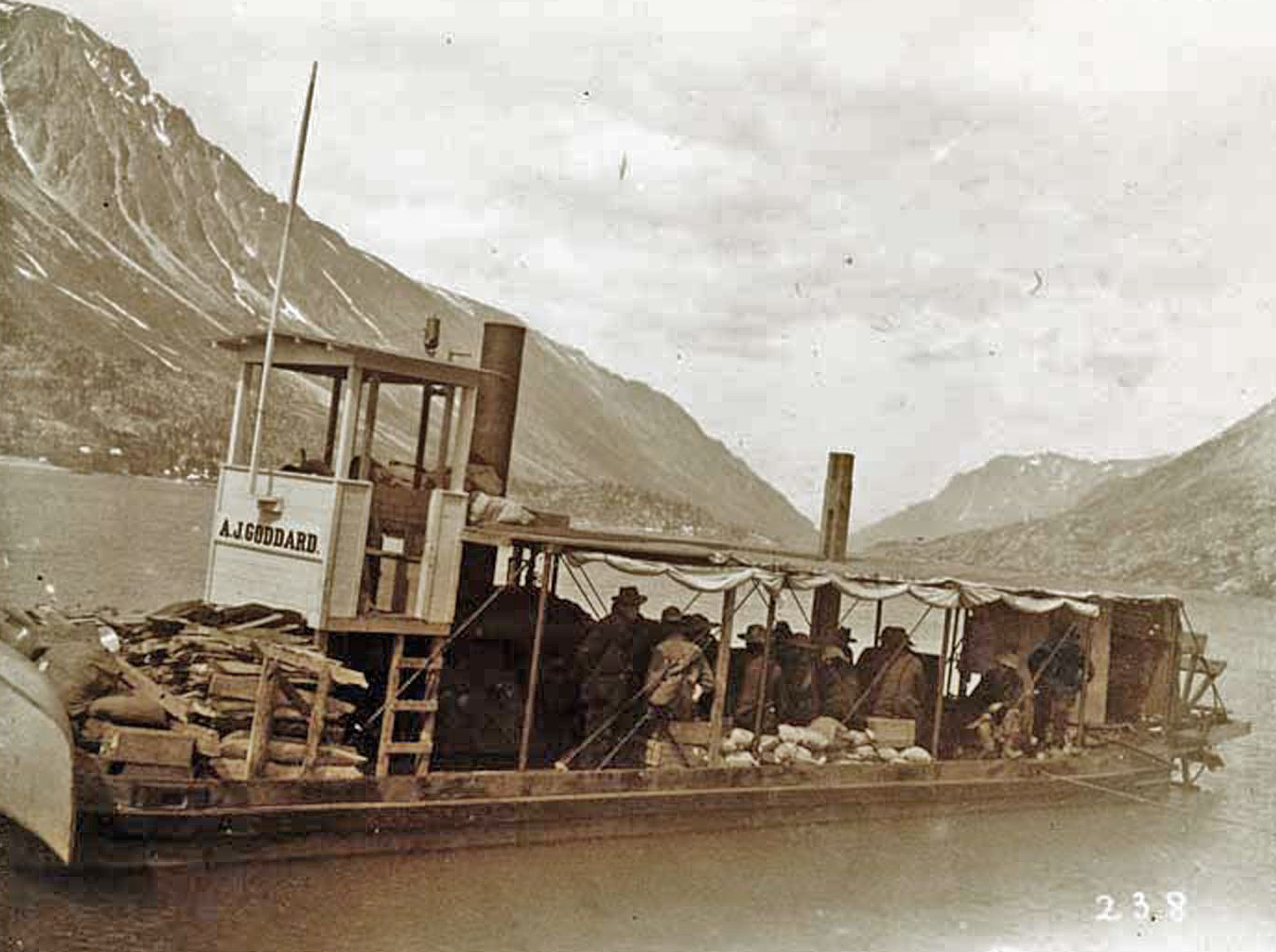

History
- Owner: Albert J. Goddard (US)
- Route: Upper Yukon River (Canada)
- Ordered: 1898
- Builder: Albert J. Goddard
- Laid down: 1898
- Completed: June 2, 1898
- In service: 1898
- Out of service: 1901
- Fate: Sank, 22 October 1901

General characteristics
- Length: 50 ft (15 m)
- Beam: 10.50 ft (3.20 m)
- Depth: 3 ft (0.91 m)
- Decks: 1
- Propulsion: Steam powered sternwheeler
- Capacity: 30
- Crew: 5

A. J. Goddard was a Klondike Gold Rush era sternwheeler owned by Seattle businessman Albert J. Goddard and built for transport of men and supplies on the Upper Yukon River in Canada. She was assembled from pieces which were manufactured in San Francisco, shipped up to Skagway, Alaska, hauled over the Coast Mountains, and finally assembled at Lake Bennett. She made one trip to Dawson during the gold rush, was sold and sank in a storm on Lake Laberge in 1901. Her wreck was discovered in 2008 by Doug Davidge and was designated as a Yukon Historic Site.

== Background ==
Albert J. Goddard, who owned and gave name to steamboat A. J. Goddard, was a Seattle businessman who owned a foundry and had expertise in fabrication and steam engineering. When the Klondike Gold Rush started he saw an opportunity to make a profit by transporting prospectors. He intended to supply them with a river boat on upper Yukon and bought parts for two small prefabricated steamboats from San Francisco which were transported north in pieces to Lake Bennett where they were reassembled by new company The Upper Yukon Company. (Note: The Yukon River is navigable, except for the five-km water at Miles Canyon and the Whitehorse Rapids.) They used the White Pass Trail or a combination of this and the parallel Chilkoot Trail and they arrived at Bennett Lake by March 1898. Thousands of men and women were camped at the lake, waiting for the ice to go out, building boats and rafts. Over the course of weeks the company assembled two 16-metre steel sternwheelers on the shores of the lake. The A.J. Goddard was completed first, followed by the F.H. Kilbourne.

== Service ==
On May 28, 1898, the ice went out on Bennett Lake. Thousands of boats took to the water within 48 hours and headed for the Dawson City. The A.J. Goddard appears to have departed Bennett on June 2, 1898, reaching Tagish Lake the next day just to return and wait for the river to get free of ice. On June 16, 1898, it departed Lake Bennett and headed for Dawson. It proceeded under its own power through the difficult stretch of Miles Canyon, only the third sternwheeler to accomplish this. It arrived in Dawson City on June 21 with ten passengers and a crew of eight as the first sternwheeler to do so in 1898. Later, it was one of the first sternwheelers to make the return trip upstream from Dawson to Whitehorse Rapids. Albert Goddard's wife Clara accompanied him on the voyage, and was later honoured as the first female riverboat pilot on the Upper Yukon River.

After the gold rush the A. J. Goddard spent much of its time in the towing business on Lake Laberge. In 1899 the company behind her was sold to a competitor, the Canadian Development Company, which appears to have confined the vessel's service between Whitehorse and the foot of the Thirty Mile River. In 1901, on October 11, the A. J. Goddard entered Lake Laberge with a large barge in tow. Here she sank during a storm. The little ship was blasted with freezing rain and snow and pounded by waves. Despite the crew's efforts, she began to take on water, which extinguished the boiler fires and left the ship without power. She sank to the lake bottom only a few hundred metres from shore. Three of the crew, Charles MacDonald, Fay Ransom and John Thompson, drowned while Julius Stockfield and Snyder were rescued by a local trapper in a rowboat.

== Wreck ==
The only thing that marked the existence of her wreck was the name of the shoreline prominence, Goddard Point, which in 1936 became an official map feature. In 1978 interest in the historical shipwrecks along the upper Yukon River increased. A Parks Canada team searched offshore of Goddard Point using divers on a towed dive board, but did not detect any sign of the wreck. In 1986 the Yukon Underwater Diving Association resumed the search funded by the Yukon's Department of Tourism. Again the search proved unsuccessful and attempts to spot the wreck from the air also failed. Similarly, in 1997 with improved technology an area near Goddard Point was scanned and a submerged feature was identified but the exact location could not be determined. Finally, in June 2008, a conventional fish finder picked up a target of interest in 15 metres (49 ft) of water, not far from Goddard Point. On July 5, this was found to be the wreck of A. J. Goddard. All findings had resemblance to her as seen in historic photos. The vessel sat upright, with debris and objects of all sorts littering the deck and surrounding area.

There were three general categories of artifacts on and around the ship. Firstly, cooking pots, enamel-ware, bottles, and cups. Secondly, a broad variety of wood and metal-working tools, including hand tools required to maintain and repair a steamboat. Finally, there were the personal effects of the crew, including small bits of clothing and shoes together with bottles of ink and vanilla. One of the more surprising finds was a gramophone in a wooden case and three Berliner records. (Note: A record containing the song "Ma Onliest One," written by the American vaudevillian Fay Templeton, was still on the turntable when the player was found.)

== Legacy ==
Most of the 266 sternwheelers that operated on the Yukon River were large multi-decked wooden vessels. The A. J. Goddard is the only example found of the smaller steamboats. The vessel was not ideally suited for the larger sections of the Yukon River; instead it had a short but successful career on Lake Laberge. Afloat for less than four years, the A. J. Goddard was an example of the inventiveness that characterized the Klondike Gold Rush. In 2010, the A.J. Goddard was designated as a Yukon Historic Site.

== Film ==
A documentary about the A. J. Goddard was started in 2014, directed by Jesse Davidge. It completed in 2016 and was produced by Blatant Studio in Vancouver, BC, Canada. The people interviewed were Doug Davidge, Lindsey Thomas, Larry Bonnett, James Delgado, Donnie Reid, Tim Dowd and Val Monahan. The film covered the history of the ship, the sinking, as well as, the discovery and work that went into the preservation of the artifacts found on the research trips in 2008 and 2009.

== Bibliography ==
- Thomas, Lindsey; Davidge, Doug; Pollack, John (2012). The Wreck of the A.J. Goddard (PDF). Government of Yukon. ISBN 978-1-55362-565-0.
