= Primrose and West =

American blackface minstrel troupe (1877–?)

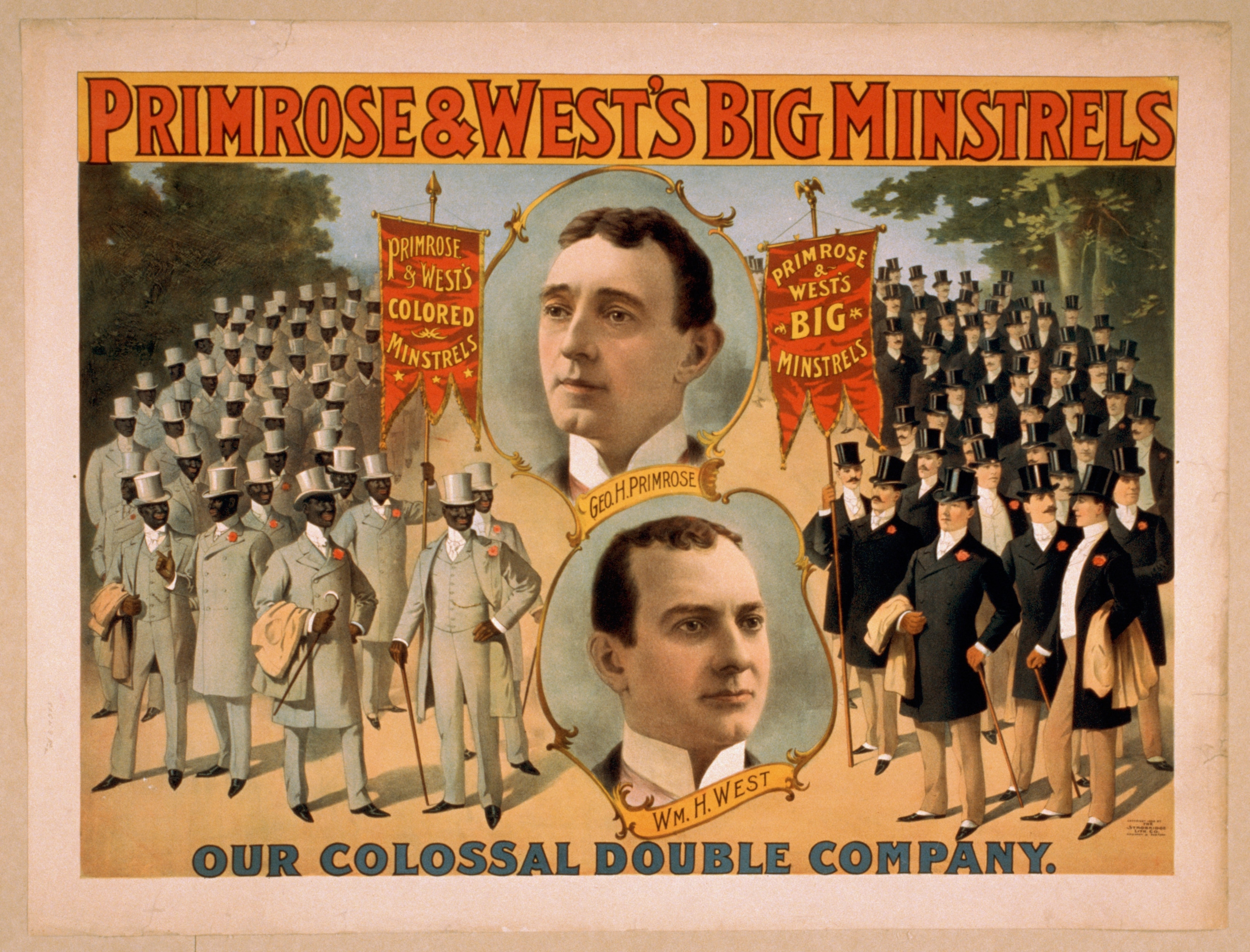

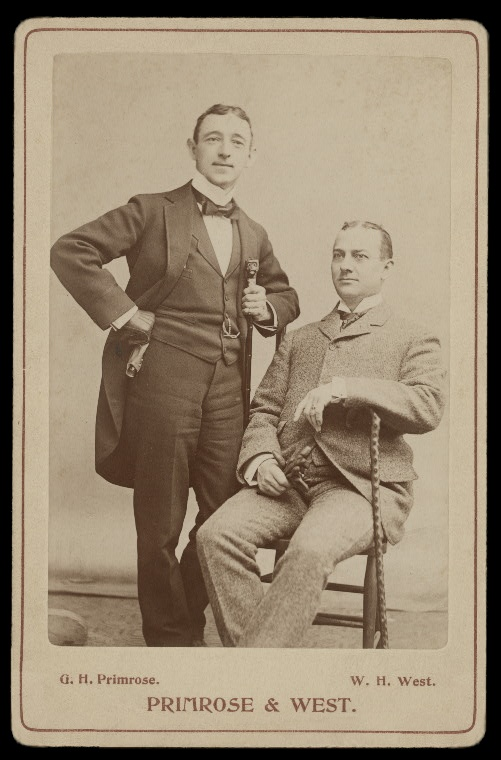
George H. Primrose and Billy West

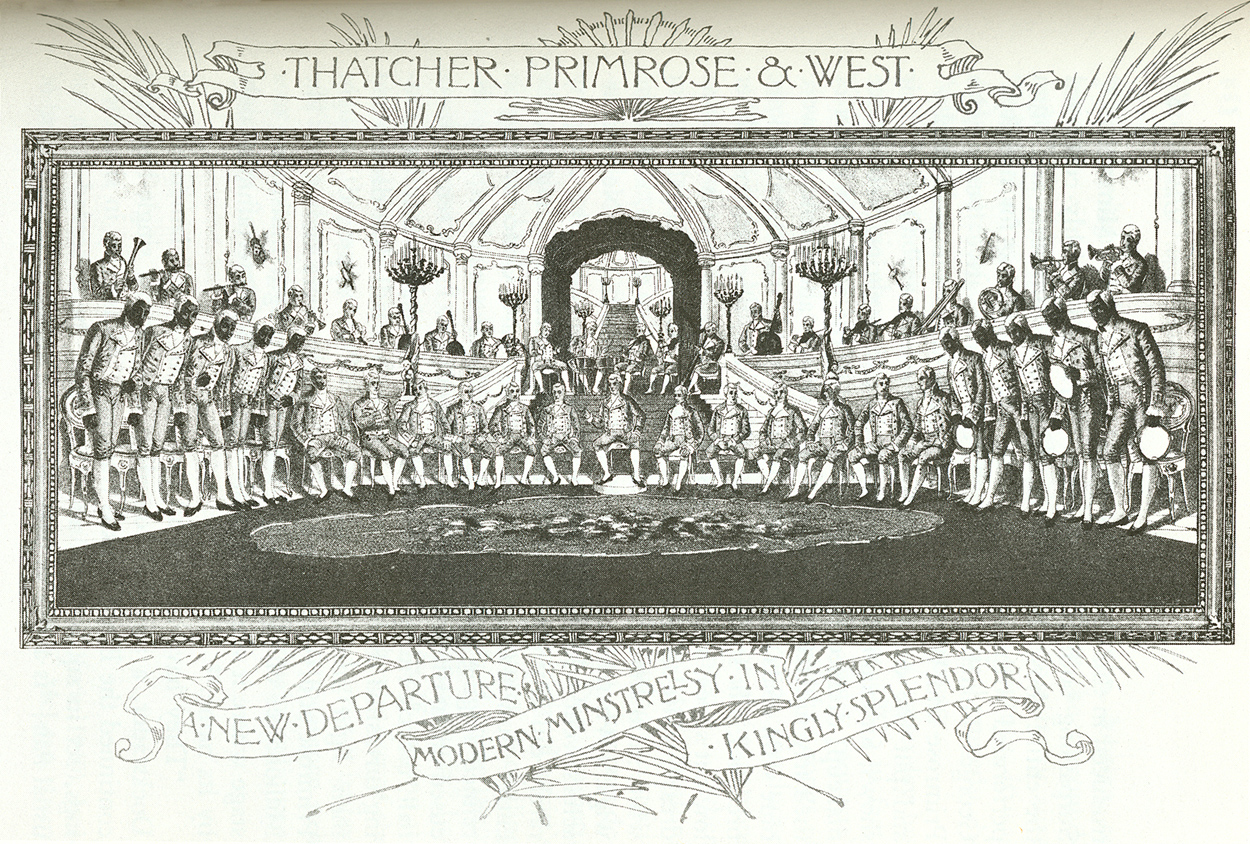
Program for Thatcher, Primrose & West's Minstrels, late 1800s.

Primrose and West, also known as Primrose and West's Minstrels, was an American blackface minstrel song-and-dance troupe made up of partners George Primrose and William H. "Billy" West. They later went into the business of minstrel troupe ownership with a refined, high-class approach that signaled the final stage in the development of minstrelsy as a distinct form of entertainment.

== History ==
In 1877, Primrose and West were playing with a minstrel troupe owned by J. H. Haverly. That year, they both quit when their demands for more pay were not met. They formed their own company, which largely copied Haverly's United Mastodon Minstrels with its elaborate sets and visual spectacle. The troupe proved so successful that in 1879, The Clipper gave them a front-page story, treatment normally reserved for famous actors and actresses.

In 1881, the pair became familiar with Sam Hague's British Minstrels, then on a U.S. tour. Primrose and West adopted Hague's techniques of ultra-refinement: Ballet and high-class music played by a large orchestra replaced low comedy and African American-themed song and dance as the main focus, and sets and costumes came to mimic fancy European powdered wigs and eveningwear. Only the (sometimes) blackfaced endmen kept the new troupe from severing its ties to minstrelsy completely. George Thatcher, one of the troupe members who became a partner of Thatcher, Primrose & West (and later had his own troupe), explained later that "We were looking for novelty, and for a change tried white minstrelsy." When Milt Barlow left the troupe in 1882, Primrose and West did away with plantation and blackface material completely. In its place, audiences witnessed such upper-class pursuits as fox hunting, lawn tennis, and yacht racing. Primrose and West had a hit, and they came to be called "The Millionaires of Minstrelsy".

Still, traditional blackface entertainers disliked the new approach. Lew Dockstader remarked that Primrose and West

had refined all the fun out of it. Minstrelsy in silk stockings, set in square cuts and bag wigs is about as palatable as an amusement as a salad of pine shavings and sawdust with a little salmon, lobster, or chicken. ... What is really good is killed by the surroundings.

Nevertheless, Primrose and West's approach caught on, and the blackface act continued only with minor troupes and as a regular fixture of vaudeville.

Primrose was mentioned in song as "Georgie Primrose" in the "Minstrel Number" during the 1954 movie White Christmas.
