= Copperbelt South =

Territorial electoral district in the Yukon, Canada

Yukon electoral district
- Boundaries of Copperbelt South in Whitehorse

Territorial electoral district
- Legislature: Yukon Legislative Assembly
MLA
Scott Kent
Yukon Party
- District created: 2009
- First contested: 2011
- Last contested: 2025

Demographics
- Electors (2021): 1,723
- Census subdivision(s): Mary Lake, Cowley Creek, Wolf Creek, Whitehorse Copper, Mount Sima, MacRae, Pineridge, Golden Horn

Copperbelt South is a territorial electoral district of Yukon that has been represented in the Yukon Legislative Assembly since 2011.

== Geography ==
The riding is an amalgamation of the former ridings of Copperbelt and Mount Lorne. It is bordered by the districts of Riverdale South, Copperbelt North, Porter Creek South, and Marsh Lake-Mount Lorne-Golden Horn.

Copperbelt South includes the subdivisions of Lobird, McLean Lake, Ear Lake Road, Canyon Crescent, Mount Sima, MacRae, Wolf Creek, Fox Haven, Pineridge, Spruce Hill, Mary Lake, Cowley Creek, and Whitehorse Copper, and it extends south to Km 1405 on the Alaska Highway.

== Members of the Legislative Assembly ==
Assembly	Years	Member	Party
Copperbelt South; Riding created from Copperbelt and Mount Lorne
33rd	2011–2016	Lois Moorcroft	New Democratic
34th	2016–2021	Scott Kent	Yukon Party
35th	2021–2025	Scott Kent	Yukon Party
36th	2025–Present	Scott Kent	Yukon Party

== Election results ==
=== 2025 ===
2025 Yukon general election
** Preliminary results — Not yet official **
Party	Candidate	Votes	%	±%
Yukon Party	Scott Kent	787	66.5	
New Democratic	Robin Reid-Fraser	337	28.5	
Liberal	Derek Yap	60	5.1	
Total valid votes		1,184		
Total rejected ballots				
Turnout				
Eligible voters				
Source(s) "Unofficial Election Results 2025". Elections Yukon.

2021 Yukon general election redistributed results
Party	Votes	%
Yukon Party	731	55
Liberal	295	22
New Democratic	295	22

=== 2021 ===
2021 Yukon general election
Party	Candidate	Votes	%	±%
Yukon Party	Scott Kent	726	56.98	+20.1
New Democratic	Kaori Torigai	289	22.68	-4.5%
Liberal	Sheila Robertson	259	20.32	-14.6%
Total valid votes		1,274		
Total rejected ballots				
Turnout				
Eligible voters				
Yukon Party hold		Swing		+18.33
Source(s) "Unofficial Election Results 2021". Elections Yukon.

=== 2016 ===
2016 Yukon general election
Party	Candidate	Votes	%	±%
Yukon Party	Scott Kent	449	36.9%	-4.8%
Liberal	Jocelyn Curteanu	425	34.9%	+18.6%
NDP	Lois Moorcroft	331	27.2%	-14.8%
Green	Philippe LeBlond	12	1.0%	+1.0%
Total		1,217	100.0%	–

=== 2011 ===
2011 Yukon general election
Party	Candidate	Votes	%	±%
NDP	Lois Moorcroft	397	42.0%	–
Yukon Party	Valerie Boxall	394	41.7%	–
Liberal	Colleen Wirth	154	16.3%	–
Total		945	100.0%	–

== See also ==
- List of Yukon territorial electoral districts
- Canadian provincial electoral districts
