= Fay Templeton =

American actress

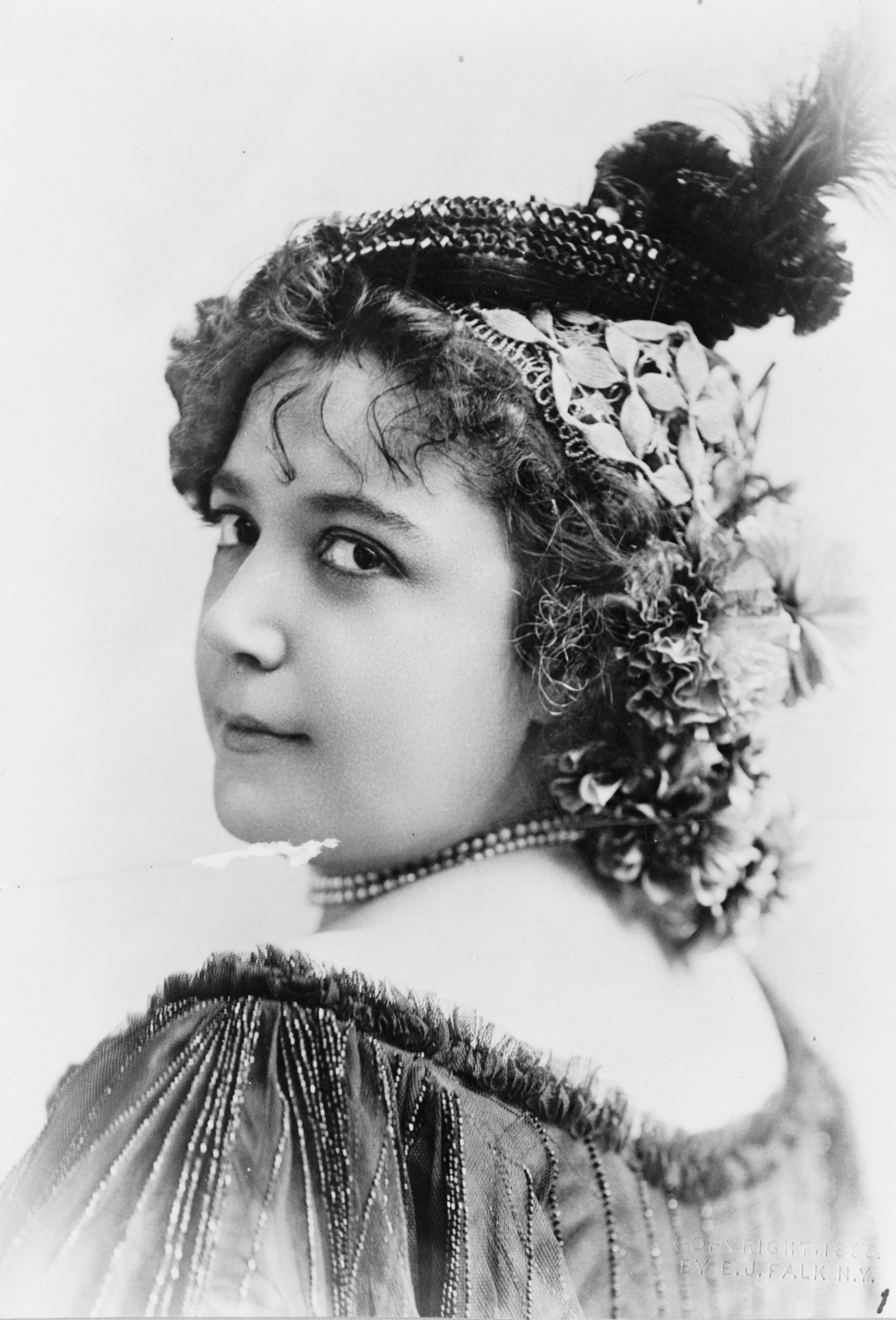
- Templeton c. 1895
- Born: December 25, 1865; Little Rock, Arkansas, U.S.
- Died: October 3, 1939 (aged 73); San Francisco, California, U.S.
- Occupation: Actress
- Years active: 1870–1934
- Spouse(s): William H. West; William J. Patterson

Fay Templeton as Puck early 1870s

Fay Templeton (December 25, 1865 – October 3, 1939) was an American actress, singer, songwriter, and comedian.

Her parents were John J. Templeton and Alice Van Asse, both of whom were actors/vaudevillians; Fay followed in their footsteps, making her Broadway debut in 1885. Templeton excelled on the legitimate and vaudeville stages for more than half a century. She was a favorite headliner and heroine of popular theater, appearing until 1934. For a time she dated Sam Shubert, of the Shubert family of theatre owners, until his death in a railroad accident.

Some of her notable performances were in H.M.S. Pinafore and Roberta. Her career longevity was attributable not only to her physical appearance, which was of the fashionable robust nature of her time, but her multitude of talents from singing to composing.

== Early life and career ==
Templeton was born on December 25, 1865, in Little Rock, Arkansas, where her parents were starring with the Templeton Opera Company. Her father, John Templeton, was a well-known Southern theatre manager, comedian, and author. Her mother, Helen Alice Vane (aka Alice Van Asse), starred with her husband. At age three, Templeton, dressed as Cupid, sang fairy tale songs between the acts of her father's plays. Gradually, she was incorporated into the productions as a bit player, and then at age 5, had lines to recite. At age 8, she played Puck in A Midsummer Night's Dream, making her New York debut at Grand Opera House.

At fifteen, Templeton joined a light opera company, playing in a juvenile version of Gilbert and Sullivan's H.M.S. Pinafore. She also played in The Mascot and Billee Taylor.

On October 7, 1885, Templeton had her formal Broadway debut in a revival of Evangeline. The play ran for 201 performances. In this show, she displayed talent as both a comedian and mimic. She starred in the London premiere of Monte Cristo Jr., an 1886 hit.

After several years on the road playing in various melodramas and musical farces, Templeton was given the title role in Hendrik Hudson, which opened at the 14th Street Theater on August 18, 1890. It was a "trouser role", one in which an actress appears in male clothing, then a popular feature of operettas. Her role was of a faithless husband. She won accolades singing "The Same Old Thing", but the show lasted only 16 performances.

By 1890, Templeton had formed her own opera company and starred in various operettas, none of which fared well financially. In 1895, she starred in another trouser role in E.E. Rice's Excelsior, Jr. at Oscar Hammerstein's Olympic Theater.

== Weber & Fields ==
In 1896, the comic duo Joe Weber and Lew Fields leased a Broadway theater which they dubbed the "Weber & Fields' Broadway Music Hall"; with this as a base of operations, they formed a stock company made up of headliners, including Templeton. Her appearance and weight well suited the burlesque stage rather than Gay Nineties; moreover, her comedic versatility, long dark hair, sultry smile, and throaty-voiced singing continued to win over audiences.

In "Fiddle Dee Dee", a 1900 Weber & Fields production, Templeton performed the John Stromberg composition "Ma Blushin' Rosie, Ma Posie Sweet", its first performance. The number became the hit of the show and was re-recorded by multiple artists in later years, including Al Jolson. In 1901, she premiered "I'm a Respectable Working Girl" in a new Music Hall show; this production incorporated elements of one-act burlesque shows "Quo Vas Iss", "Arizona", 'Exhibit II", and "Fiddle Dee Dee". For all of these, music was composed Stromberg with lyrics by Edgar Smith.

In 1903, Templeton introduced the whimsical "The Woodchuck Song" (How much wood would a woodchuck chuck) written by Robert Hobart Davis for her, as part of the musical The Runaways.

== 1906 to 1913 ==
George M. Cohan hired Templeton to play the lead in Forty-Five Minutes from Broadway. Templeton introduced the hit songs "So Long Mary" and "Mary Is a Grand Old Name". The musical debuted on January 1, 1906 at the New Amsterdam Theatre on Broadway and ran for 90 performances before closing on March 17. Following her August marriage to Pittsburgh industrialist William Patterson, Templeton announced her retirement from the stage yet reprised her role in Forty-Five Minutes from Broadway for its November re-opening.

In 1911, Weber & Fields began planning their reunion with a Jubilee touring company featuring all the old Music Hall stars. Templeton was one of the first to volunteer. The tour lasted five months and broke all records for touring companies. She continued in vaudeville with an act that included songs from previous shows.

During her time with Weber & Fields, Templeton frequently appeared alongside Peter F. Dailey, a well known burlesque and vaudeville performer. Dailey died in 1908, shortly after a performance, in Chicago; he was buried in the West family plot along with Fay's first husband, William H. West. West and Dailey were brothers-in-law, married to sisters Emma Hanley and Mary Hanley Angus, respectively.

In 1913, Templeton again announced her retirement.

== Recordings and motion pictures ==
Templeton appeared in only one full-length motion picture, preferring to perform in the live theatre. Her sole foray into full-length motion pictures was 1933’s Broadway to Hollywood (film), which featured many stars of the stage in numerous roles.

Templeton appeared in at least three short films from 1904 to 1907.

Many of Templeton's songwriting efforts were performed on radio and recorded on phonograph. However, no recordings of her voice are extant.

== Returning to performing ==
In 1925, Templeton appeared in an 'old-timer's' show at the Palace Theater, again working with Weber & Fields. At this time, Templeton re-announced retirement. Asked if she would continue to perform, she replied, "It's been great fun, but it's a new Broadway and a new theater, and hereafter I'll be content to look on from out front".

In another change of heart, she returned to the stage in 1926 to play Mrs. Cripps, aka 'Buttercup', in a revival of H.M.S. Pinafore. Again, she claimed it was her last appearance on stage.

When Templeton's husband died suddenly in 1932, she returned to the stage to resume earning a living; her husband's estate was never settled, leaving her without independent means of support.

Her most significant stage appearance was in 1934’s production of "Roberta" by Jerome Kern in the role of Aunt Minnie, a dress shop owner in Paris. "Smoke Gets In Your Eyes", which was debuted in this play, became a signature American classic song. Written for Templeton, the musical number "Yesterdays" has also entered the American songbook as a jazz standard. While no recording of Templeton's rendition exists, the classic has been covered by dozens of artists over the decades since Templeton's launch of it in the show.

Bob Hope, in his American stage debut, provided comic relief for this show, which ran nine months.

== Personal life ==
In May 1883, Templeton eloped with William H. West ("Billy"), a blackface minstrel performer, marrying in Nashville, Tennessee. After a three week visit to New York City, followed by three weeks in Chicago, Templeton left West and returned to New York. West filed for divorce in December 1886, in Chicago, citing "desertion" by Templeton. Templeton acknowledged this marriage on the marriage license for her 1906 wedding to William J Patterson, altering her "age at first marriage" to 15. No records have been found for the dissolution of this marriage other than press reports.

In 1887, Templeton began a long term relationship with Howell Osborn, the son of a wealthy New York City broker. Osborn was described as "the most conspicuous of the gilded youth about town". The two lived in England and toured the continent for several years. At his death in May 1895, Osborn left Templeton $100,000; Templeton signed the probate record as "Fay Templeton-Osborn, formerly Fay Templeton", implying that the couple were wed. Further, on her marriage license to her final husband, Templeton listed her name as "Fay T. Osborn". No marriage license or records for Osborn and Templeton are noted to support assertions that the couple married in France. After debts were paid from Osborn's estate, less than $21,000 was remaindered to Templeton.

On 1 Aug 1906, Templeton married William J Patterson, a partner at the Pittsburgh engineering firm of Heyl & Patterson Inc. Their marriage was held in Ridley Park, Pennsylvania. Following a European honeymoon, the couple made their main residence in Springdale, Pennsylvania. The marriage, which was childless, ended in Patterson's death in 1931. Patterson died intestate; his estate, valued at $136,000, was never distributed and his death left Templeton destitute.

== Death ==
At age 71 and suffering from arthritis, Templeton found herself unable to support herself. In 1936, she relocated from Pittsburgh to the Lillian Booth Actors Home in Englewood, New Jersey.

Afterward, Templeton moved to San Francisco, living with a cousin. She died on October 3, 1939, at age 73, in San Francisco.

== Musical compositions recovered ==
In June 2010, recordings of music composed by Fay Templeton preserved on two 1896-1897 gramophone recordings were discovered aboard the wreck of the Klondike Gold Rush paddlewheeler A. J. Goddard. Other recordings were discovered as well. The Goddard sank in a storm on October 22, 1901, in Lake Laberge, Yukon. The wreckage was first discovered in June 2008; the recordings were discovered on a more complete exploration of the vessel on 5 Jul 2008. The recordings' vocals featured other artists, but no voice recordings of Templeton, either speaking or singing, were part of the wreckage recovery.

Templeton's recovered titles are "Ma Onliest One", recorded in New York on April 17, 1896, with Len Spencer heard in the vocals, and "Rendez Vous Waltz", recorded on July 1, 1897, with music performed by the Metropolitan Orchestra. The gramophone recording process used on these discs was developed by Emile Berliner.

== In popular culture ==
In the 1941 musical Babes on Broadway, Judy Garland performs an impression of Templeton singing "Mary's a Grand Old Name".

In the 1942 movie musical Yankee Doodle Dandy, Templeton was portrayed by actress Irene Manning.

In the 1968 Broadway musical George M!, she was portrayed by Jacqueline Alloway.

== Selected musicals ==
- Evangeline (1885)
- Fiddle-Dee-Dee (1900) with David Warfield and De Wolfe Hopper
- Broadway to Tokio (1900), as Cleopatra
- The Runaways (1903)
- George M. Cohan's Forty-five Minutes from Broadway (1906) with Victor Moore
- Hokey-Pokey (1912) with Joe Weber, Lew Fields, and Lillian Russell

== Selected short-version filmography ==
- The Strenuous Life; or Anti-Race Suicide (1903, short; Edison). A satire directed at then-President Theodore Roosevelt.
- How a French Nobleman Got a Wife Through the New York Herald Personal Columns (1904, short; Edison). A parody of the late nineteenth/early 20th century phenomenon of the American dollar princess marriages between impoverished European aristocrats and wealthy American women.
- Getting Evidence (1907, short; Edison)
