= Albert J. Goddard =

American politician

A. J. Goddard
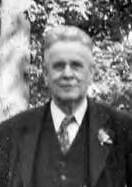

Member of the Washington House of Representatives for the 43rd district
- In office 1895–1897

Personal details
- Born: July 15, 1863 Muscatine County, Iowa, United States
- Died: April 20, 1958 (aged 94) Auburn, Washington, United States
- Party: Republican

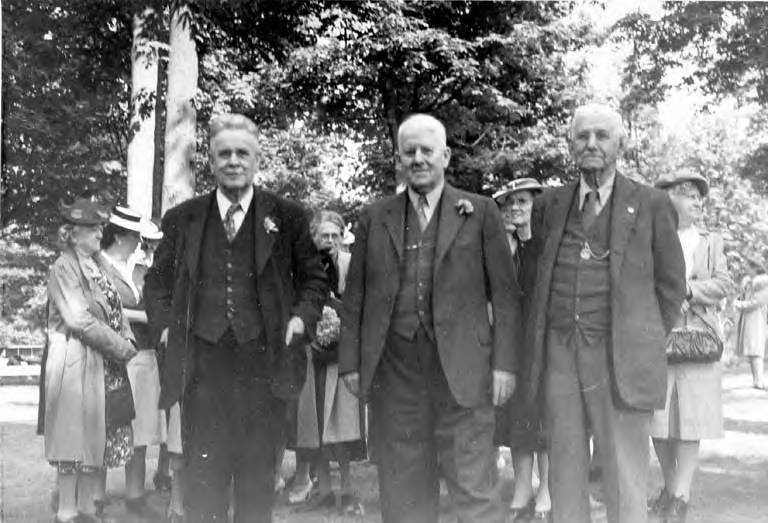
Goddard at left, circa 1920s, with fellow former City Council member William H. Murphy and former Seattle mayor George F. Cotterill

Albert J. Goddard (July 15, 1863 – April 20, 1958) was an American politician in the state of Washington. He served in the Washington House of Representatives from 1895 to 1897.

Goddard was born in Iowa in 1863. He graduated in 1884 from the Norton Scientific Academy in Wilton, Iowa. In 1888, he moved to the Washington Territory and with his brother Charles established Pacific Iron Works, a foundry in Fremont, Washington, a small city that was annexed by Seattle in 1891. He was the mayor of Fremont before that annexation.

Because of its location remote from the center of Seattle, Pacific Iron Works was the only Seattle-area foundry or machine shop to survive the Great Seattle Fire in June 1889.

From 1892 to 1894, he was a member of the Seattle City Council (a bicameral legislature at the time) and, in 1894 and 1895 served in the Washington House of Representatives. During the Klondike Gold Rush, he and his wife Clara relocated to Alaska and ran a successful steamboat operation carrying prospectors to and from the Yukon Territory from 1897 to 1901. With them to Alaska, they brought the materials to build sawmill and two steamboats, which were hauled on the Dead Horse Trail over White Pass to Skagway. The boat he named after himself, the A. J. Goddard and the F. H. Kilbourne were the first two steamboats to run the upper Yukon River from Skagway to Dawson City. After the Gold Rush they returned to Seattle.

He served again on the Seattle City Council from 1908 to 1915, and ran unsuccessfully to return to the Council in 1931. He was active in banking and as a building contractor, and was heavily involved in Gold Rush reunions.

The sternwheeler-utility boat A. J. Goddard sank in 1901 and was rediscovered largely intact in 2008. On board the boat were artifacts of the period such as a gramophone with contemporary recordings.
