= Choiseul Henriquez =

Haitian politician and journalist

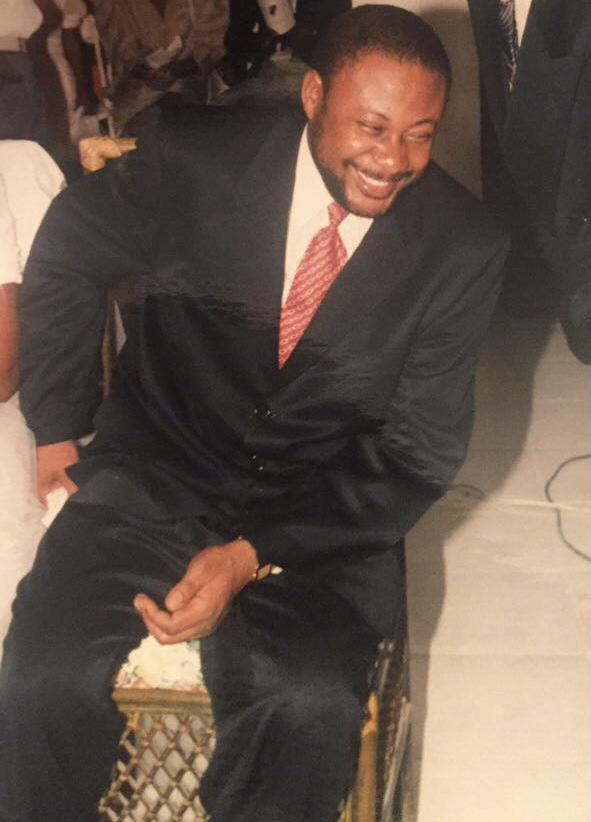
Haiti's Minister of Culture and Communication in 2011.

Choiseul Henriquez (died November 11, 2011) was a Haitian politician and journalist. Haitian President Michel Martelly appointed Henriquez as the country's Minister of Culture and Communication, but Henriquez died before taking office.

Henriquez began his career as a journalist. He worked as a press secretary within the administration of former Haitian President René Préval from 1996 to 2001. He held a bachelor's degree in political science and a master's degree in communications from Canadian universities.

President Martelly appointed Henriquez as his Minister of Culture and Communication in 2011. Unfortunately, Henriquez fell ill and was hospitalized before his proposed inauguration on October 18, 2011, and thus never took office. Henriquez was initially hospitalized at Canape Vert Hospital before being transferred to Canada for treatment. He died at Ottawa Civic Hospital in Ottawa, Ontario, Canada, from a cerebral hemorrhage on November 11, 2011, at the age of 51. Henriquez had suffered from hypertension and diabetes. President Martelly released a statement stating, "With the early departure of the holder of Culture and Communication, the country loses a son animated by the desire to support the new government on the path of change as desired by the people of Haiti."

Pierre-Raymond Dumas, a journalist and writer, was nominated by the INITE political party and approved by President Martelly, as Henriquez's successor.
