= Steve Cardiff =

Canadian politician

MLA for Mount Lorne
- In office 2002–2011
- Preceded by: Cynthia Tucker
- Succeeded by: riding dissolved

Personal details
- Born: August 10, 1957 Port Alberni, British Columbia
- Died: July 6, 2011 (aged 53) One kilometre north of Lewes Lake on the South Klondike Highway
- Party: New Democrat
- Occupation: sheetmetal worker

Steve Cardiff (August 10, 1957 – July 6, 2011) was a Canadian politician. He represented the electoral district of Mount Lorne in the Yukon Legislative Assembly.

== Political career ==
He was first elected to the Yukon legislature in the 2002 general election and re-elected in 2006. He won convincingly both times.

He was the NDP caucus critic for the Department of Community Services, the Department of Education, the Department of Highways and Public Works, the Department of Justice, the Yukon Workers' Compensation Health and Safety Board, the Yukon Housing Corporation and the Yukon Liquor Corporation. Cardiff shared critic responsibilities for the Department of Economic Development with party leader Todd Hardy, and was the Third Party House Leader.

Prior to becoming Mount Lorne's MLA Cardiff worked as a certified sheet metal journeyman on industrial, commercial and residential projects in every Yukon community.

For 16 of his 20 years in the sheet metal trade, he volunteered as the local president of the United Association of Plumbers and Pipefitters. He volunteered on the executive of the Yukon Federation of Labour for two years at the same time. He also served on Yukon College's board of governors, which he did for nine years, acting as chair for his final three. He is an active volunteer with the Mount Lorne Community Association.

In February 2009, Cardiff declared his candidacy for the leadership of the New Democrats, following Hardy's resignation as party leader. However, he withdrew from the race later in the year for unspecified personal reasons.

Cardiff was killed in a two-vehicle road accident, one kilometre north of Lewes Lake on the South Klondike Highway, involving a tractor trailer and a small vehicle.

== Electoral record ==
=== 2006 general election ===
Mount Lorne
Party	Candidate	Votes	%	±%
NDP	Steve Cardiff	361	43.6%	+3.9%
Yukon Party	Valerie Boxall	236	28.5%	-3.7%
Liberal	Colleen Wirth	231	27.9%	-0.2%
Total		828	100.0%	–

=== 2002 general election ===
Mount Lorne
Party	Candidate	Votes	%	±%
NDP	Steve Cardiff	334	39.7%	+6.0%
Yukon Party	Darcy Tkachuk	271	32.2%	+10.8%
Liberal	Cynthia Tucker	236	28.1%	-16.9%
Total		841	100.0%	–
