= Milt G. Barlow =

American entertainer (1843–1904)

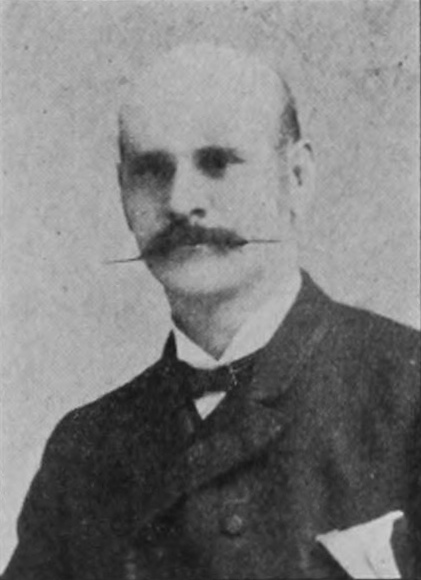
- Born: June 29, 1843; Lexington, Kentucky, U.S.A.
- Died: September 27, 1904 (aged 61); New York City, New York, U.S.A.
- Occupations: Minstrel and Vaudeville Entertainer
- Writing career
- Years active: 1867–1903

Milt G. Barlow (June 29, 1843 – September 27, 1904) was an American blackface comedian and actor popular in minstrel and vaudeville shows over the latter half of the 19th century.

== Early life ==
Barlow was born on June 29, 1843, at Lexington, Kentucky. He was the son of James Madison and Elizabeth Susan (née Barlow) Barlow. He was probably raised in the household of an uncle in Harrison County, Kentucky, after his parents divorced and his father, a silversmith, relocated to Salt Lake City. At the age of twelve Barlow began working as a printer's devil for a newspaper in Cynthiana, the county seat of Harrison County some thirty miles north of Lexington. He was forced to abandon the job at age fourteen when it began to affect his health. Barlow spent the next few years working on a Missouri farm (possibly a relative's) before moving on to Louisville, Kentucky where he would resume working as a printer.

== Military service ==
Barlow served in the American Civil War enlisting on April 23, 1861, at Louisville as a private with Company C of the First Kentucky Infantry. He would later serve with several Virginia cavalry companies before surrendering at Appomattox Court House in April 1865 along with the remnants of General Robert E. Lee's army.

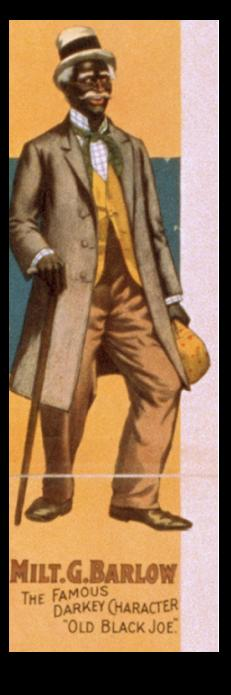
Library of Congress (ca. 1880s)

== Career ==
One of Barlow's earliest performances was in 1867 when he teamed up with James and William Arthur, a song-and-dance duo who called themselves the Barlow Brothers. Beginning in 1871 Barlow would play in such minstrel shows as the Jackson Emorsonians, Harry Robinson's Minstrels, Benjamin's New Orleans Minstrels, Haverly's Minstrels and Sweatman and Frasier's Minstrels. In 1877 he formed with George Wilson, George H. Primrose, and John T. West, the very successful Barlow, Wilson, Primrose and West Minstrels. In later years he would form shows with George Wilson and later yet with Wilson and Carl Rankin. Barlow also toured in a number of plays, usually playing African American slaves or former slaves. His most notably performances were in Uncle Tom's Cabin where he played the title role and in productions in which he played Old Black Joe, a character he had created over the years. Milt G. Barlow was, for better or worse, considered one of the best "burnt-cork" actors of his day. His finale performances were in 1903 playing the Minister to Dahomey, in A Texas Steer productions.

== Marriages ==
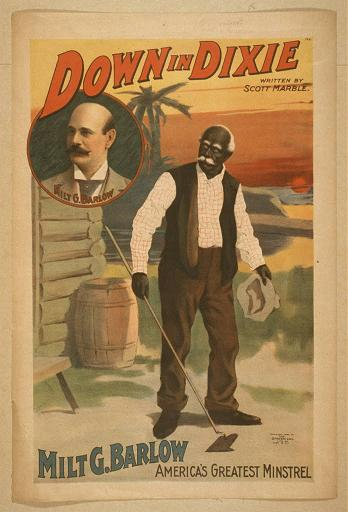
Library of Congress (ca. 1880s)

Barlow's first marriage to Martha Giles is something of a mystery for neither her nor their son Reginald's names appear in any early public record available to this writer. One source has suggested that Martha may have been a Canadian actress, though a large Giles family lived near his uncle William Barlow's farm in Harrison County, Kentucky, thus not far from Cynthiana. In the 1870 US census Barlow is listed as a resident of Cincinnati, Ohio with his wife Molly and one-year-old daughter Lillie. Ten years later census records have him living at his mother's boarding house in Toledo, Ohio with his wife Mary and children, Lillie, age eleven and Harry, age nine. Molly and Mary were both born in Kentucky around 1847 and are possibly the same person, Mary Muir, a daughter of Samuel and Mary Cory Muir of Paris, Kentucky. Milt Barlow would later spend much of the year 1887 as a guest of New York's Ludlow Street Jail after a judge charged him with contempt of court for failing to make his alimony obligations. Barlow married next actress Lilly (Lillie) Hall on March 14, 1888, a union that ended in divorce on January 20, 1899, after allegations of drunkenness and battery.

== Death ==
Milton G. Barlow died of throat cancer on September 27, 1904, at the Home of the Incurables in New York City. He was survived by his former wives and children, though curiously Reginald is not mentioned in any of his obituaries. Both Harry and Reginald would follow their father's lead and take to the stage. After a distinguished military career Reginald Barlow would find success as a character actor on Broadway and in Hollywood. Harry Barlow's career mirrored more his father's, but was cut short by his untimely death in 1909. Harry's daughter, Violet Muir Barlow (1901–1963) was a vaudeville and nightclub entertainer known for her comedy dance routines. Violet also appeared in several motion pictures in the 1930s and '40s.
