= Victor Ward =

Canadian miner (1923–2011)

Victor Vincent "Dick" Ward (June 24, 1923 – April 17, 2011) was a Canadian miner who was trapped in the mines during the 1956 Explosion.

Ward was born in Springhill, Nova Scotia, to Vincent and Laura Ward. He served on HMCS Haida during World War II. He was working in the Springhill mines when the explosion occurred, trapping him inside. He was rescued shortly after. Ward worked for Air Canada for several years, eventually retiring and returning to Springhill.

Struggling with health for some time, Ward died peacefully at the age of 87 on April 17, 2011, after a short illness. He is survived by three daughters.
