= Undergrounders =

Novel written by Canadian author David Skuy

- Author: David Skuy
- Language: English
- Genre: Realistic fiction
- Published: Scholastic Canada
- Publication date: 2011
- Publication place: Canada
- Media type: Print (paperback)
- Pages: 194
- Awards: Silver Birch Awards
- ISBN: 978-1-4431-0728-0
- OCLC: 709938888

Undergrounders is a novel written by Canadian author David Skuy, published by Scholastic Canada in 2011 and winner of the 2012 Silver Birch award.

== Plot ==
The plot is about a young boy named Jonathon (nicknamed Mouse) that lives in the "Underground" as his mother died of cancer.

The story is narrated by Jonathon, a 12-year-old boy. After his mom died from cancer, her boyfriend, Ron, left Jonathon and the landlord kicked him out. He survived in the forest on berries, but soon, it became cold, and another homeless boy named Lewis took him to the "Underground", a basement of an abandoned shopping mall, that was apparently never built past the underground portion.

One day, while Jonathan was begging for money, he entered a hockey store (Baxter's) through an alleyway. From there, he stole a pair of Grafs (Ice hockey skates), a Maple Leafs jersey, an ice hockey puck, an Easton ice hockey stick, two pairs of gloves, one pair of winter mittens and a roll of stick tape, as well as five dollars, a sandwich and a Coca-Cola. After that, Jonathan went back to the rink, to practice his skills. There, he met Rasheed, Collin and Derrick. Meanwhile, Lewis tells Jonathan that he has something planned for him.

For days, Jonathan continued to practice at the hockey rink, until he is invited to join Rasheed's hockey team. While in the hockey team, he scores many of the goals. One day, after a hockey game, he accidentally overhears his teammates gossiping behind his back. This results in Jonathan leaving the hockey team.

Soon after, Lewis finds something for Jonathan, which is theft. After Jonathan steals from an electronics store, he gets mad at Lewis, which results in a broken friendship. After, when he pays his 50 cent admission to the Underground, Rigger, the collector, states that he has to pay more, as he stored his hockey equipment there. As a result, he asks Lewis for the money (which he doesn't give) and then is kicked out of the Underground.

Now as a street kid, W5 and his gang chase Jonathon. He is then saved by the caretaker at the hockey rink. Soon after, Jonathon visits a Chinese bun store. One of the Undergrounders then visit, and Jonathon punches him, resulting in him getting banned from the store. After he has no sleeping bag to sleep with, he tries to find a garage to sleep in. He then finds Rasheed's garage, and decides to camp inside. In the morning, Rasheed and her sister, Alisha find him in it. After Rasheed's family takes Jonathon in their house, Jonathon explains the whole story. Rasheed's family decide to take him in for a little while.

Jonathon rejoins the hockey team, after they lost their past two games. Jonathon starts to pass to his other teammates, but doesn't win the game. At the end, Rick talks to Jonathon about foster homes. He also mentions staying with their family for a little while, which he gladly accepts.

== Themes ==
The major themes in this story are street life and hockey.

== Critical reception ==
Shaun Smith of Quill & Quire gave the book a positive review, saying "While the pat message about the value of sports is a touch overplayed here, the novel’s real strength comes from Mouse’s experience of the world as a fearful and dangerous place. Also, though Skuy ultimately offers up a storybook ending, the grittier aspects of Undergrounders may well give young readers pause to consider what life must be like for the innumerable homeless children of the world."

== Awards ==
The book has won the 2012 Silver Birch awards. The book has been shortlisted for the 2012 Snow Willow awards and the 2013 Rocky Mountain Book Award. It has also been a runner-up for the Manitoba Young Readers' Choice Award.
