= Marie-Andrée Bertrand =

French-Canadian criminologist, a feminist and anti-prohibitionist

Marie-Andrée Bertrand OQ (June 12, 1925 – March 6, 2011) was a French-Canadian criminologist, a feminist and anti-prohibitionist.

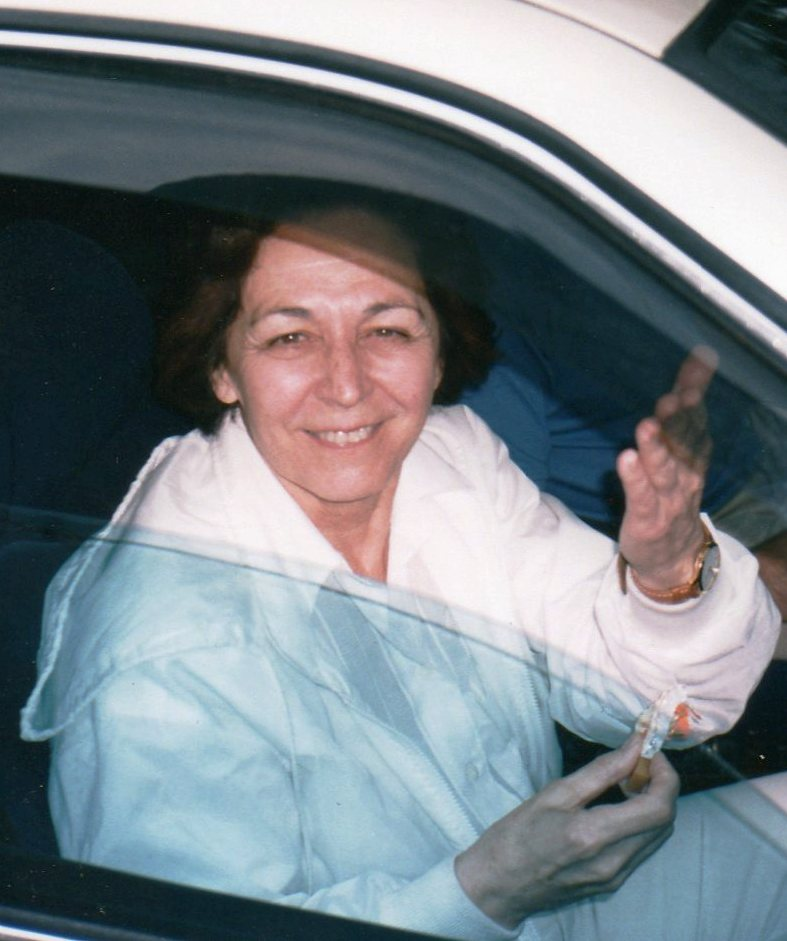
Marie Andrée Bertrand (Onati 1997)

== Biography ==
Bertrand was born in Montreal and started her career as a social worker for female offenders, mainly sex workers. In 1963, she received a master's degree from the Université de Montréal. She went on to study criminology at the School of Criminology, University of California, Berkeley, where she got her Ph.D. in 1967. She held a professorship in criminology at the School of Criminology, Université de Montréal. She continued to work, until her death, doing research, teaching and publishing. In 1999/2000 and again in 2000/2001, she taught a course on "Gender, Colour and Legal Norms" in the Masters Program at the International Institute for the Sociology of Law in Onati, Spain. Marie-Andrée Bertrand died on March 6, 2011, in Montreal.

== Main areas of research ==
The focus of Bertrand's research was on three areas: drug policy, the treatment of women by criminal justice agencies, and, more generally, critical, feminist theory concerning criminology and sociology of law. Among her main works is an international comparison of female criminality (1979, 2003) and a comparative analysis of women's prisons(1998).

== Activism ==
Bertrand went beyond mere academic work in several fields. As a young professor, she served as one of 5 Commissioners on the Le Dain Commission, which was charged to look into the effects of non-medical drug use on Canadian society. The commission's final report came out in favour of repealing the prohibition against simple possession of cannabis (3 of the Commissioners: LeDain, Lehmann and Stein), along with two minority reports one to maintain the prohibition for all cannabis offences (Campbell) and the other, by Marie-Andree Bertrand, to adopt full legalization of cannabis. Later, she joined Marco Pannella and his International Antiprohibitionist League, becoming eventually president of the organization. Among her causes was also the abolition of prisons, which goal she called "a necessary utopia". But first and last, she was an untiring feminist. As late as 2007, she is being quoted as saying: "A retired feminist does not easily repose and has no desire to do so".

== Publications (selection) ==
- Self-image and social representations of female offenders : a comparative study of female criminality in seven countries, Doctoral thesis, University of California, Berkeley, 1967. Reprint: Self image and social representation of female offenders: a contribution to the study of women's image in some societies. Ann Arbor, Michigan 1974.
- La femme et le crime. Montréal 1979.
- Perspectives féministes sur le droit pénal », Actes du Premier sommet mondial : Femmes et multidiniensionnalité du pouvoir, Montréal. 1990, pp. 138-140.
- From La donna delinquente to a postmodern deconstruction of the "woman question" in social control theory. In: The Journal of Human Justice, 5, 2, Spring 1994, pp. 43–57.
- The place and status of feminist criminology in Germany, Denmark, Norway and Finland. In: N. Rafter und F. Heidensohn (Hrsg.): International Feminist Perspectives on Criminology - Engendering a Discipline. 1995, S. 107–124.
- Constructivism and postmodernism seen from feminism. In: Politischer Wandel, Gesellschaft und Kriminalitatdiskurse. Festschrift in Honour of Fritz Sack, Trutz von Trotha, editor, Baden-Baden, Nomos Publishing Co., 1996, pp. 167–181.
- Women in Prisons: A Comparative Study. In: Caribbean Journal of Criminology and Social Psychology, 1996, 1, 1, pp. 38–58
- Prisons pour femmes. (with Louise Biron et al.) Montréal 1998.
- Le Droit comme Instrument de Mondialisation. In: J. Feest (Hrsg.): Globalization and Legal Cultures. Onati 1999, S. 113–139.
- Incarceration as a Gendering Strategy. In: Canadian Journal of Law and Society, 1999, 14, 1, pp. 45–60 (Sondernummer über Gender, Ethnizität, (Hetero)Sexualität und Normen. Herausgegeben von Marie-Andrée Bertrand).
- Les femmes et la criminalité. Montréal 2003.
- Le reve d'une societé sans risques. In: Drogues, santé et societé. Band 4, Nr. 2, Dezember 2005, S. 9–48.
- Comparing women's prisons: epistemological and methodological issues. In: D. Nelken (Hrsg.) Contrasting Criminal Justice. Aldershot 2006, 117–135.
