= Yukon Federation of Labour =

Trade union

YFL
- Yukon Federation of Labour
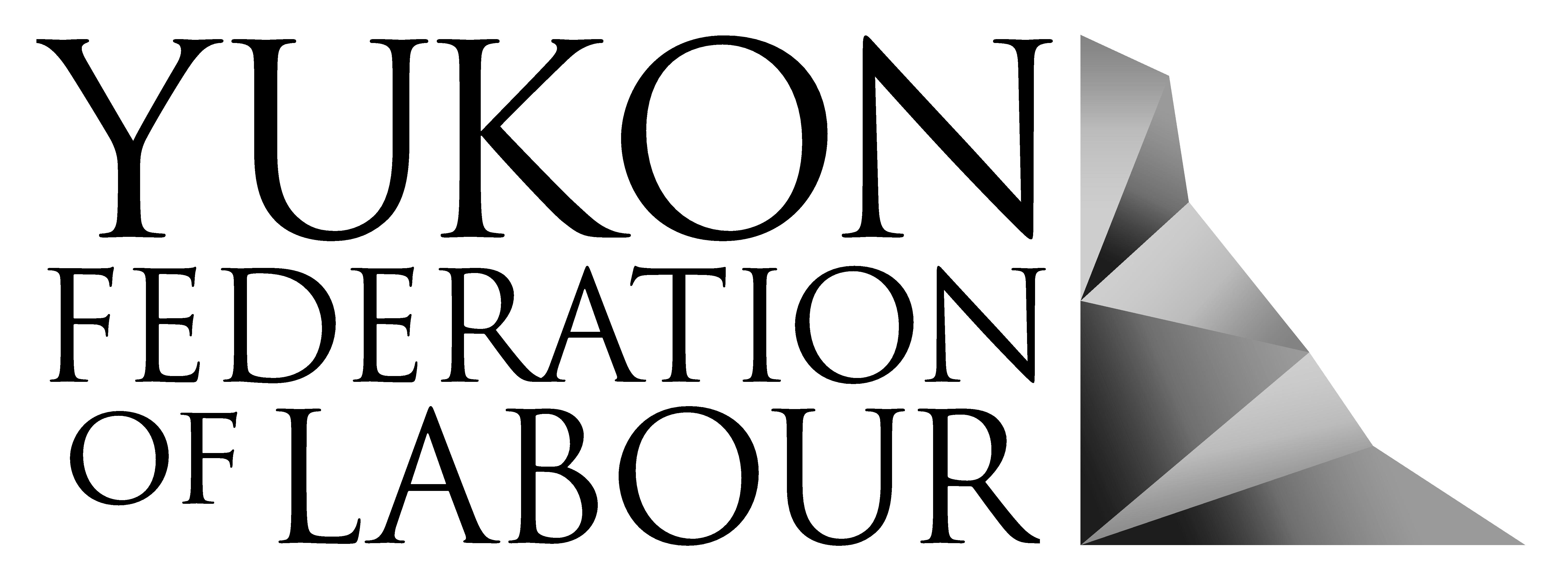
- Founded: 1980
- Headquarters: Whitehorse, Yukon
- Location: Canada
- Members: 5,000
- Key people: Vikki Quocksister, president
- Affiliations: Canadian Labour Congress
- Website: www.yukonfed.com

The Yukon Federation of Labour (YFL) is the Yukon trade union federation of labour chartered by the Canadian Labour Congress (CLC). Although the Yukon is not a province, the CLC has recognized the YFL as a provincial federation of labour with the same standing as those of the ten Canadian provinces.
