= Mount Lorne (electoral district) =

Former territorial electoral district in the Yukon, Canada

Yukon electoral district
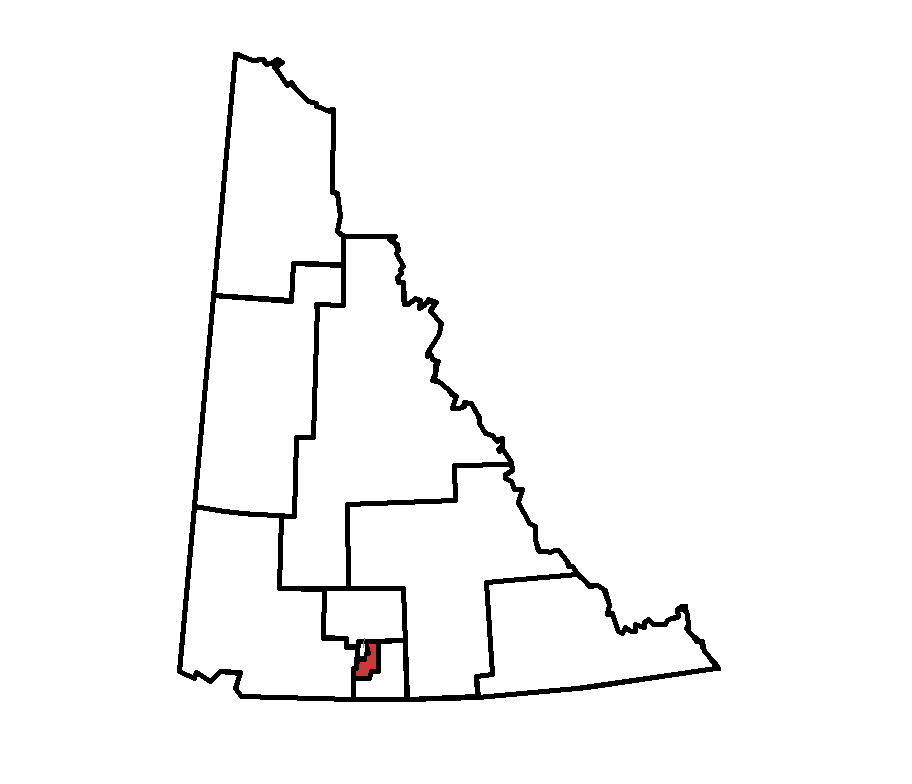
- Mount Lorne in relation to other rural Yukon electoral districts

Defunct territorial electoral district
- Legislature: Yukon Legislative Assembly
- District created: 1992
- District abolished: 2009
- First contested: 1992
- Last contested: 2006

Mount Lorne is a former electoral district which returned a member (known as an MLA) to the Legislative Assembly of the Yukon Territory in Canada. The riding included the Whitehorse subdivisions of Golden Horn, Wolf Creek, Mary Lake, and Cowley Creek, as well as the Hamlet of Mount Lorne.

In the 2009 electoral redistribution, Mount Lorne was separated, with the Hamlet of Mount Lorne merging with the riding of Southern Lakes to create Mount Lorne-Southern Lakes and the rest of the riding merging with part of the former riding of Copperbelt to form Copperbelt South.

The riding was largely considered a New Democrat stronghold.

== MLAs ==
| Parliament | Years | Member | Party |
|---|---|---|---|
| 28th | 1992–1996 | Lois Moorcroft | Yukon New Democratic Party |
| 29th | 1996–1999 | Lois Moorcroft | Yukon New Democratic Party |
| 30th | 2000–2002 | Cynthia Tucker | Yukon Liberal Party |
| 31st | 2002–2006 | Steve Cardiff | Yukon New Democratic Party |
| 32nd | 2006–2011 | Steve Cardiff | Yukon New Democratic Party |
| 32nd | 2011 | | Vacant |

== Electoral results ==
=== 2006 ===
2006 Yukon general election
| Party | Candidate | Votes | % | ±% |
|---|---|---|---|---|
| NDP | Steve Cardiff | 361 | 43.6% | +3.9% |
| Yukon Party | Valerie Boxall | 236 | 28.5% | -3.7% |
| Liberal | Colleen Wirth | 231 | 27.9% | -0.2% |
| Total | | 828 | 100.0% | – |

=== 2002 ===
2002 Yukon general election
| Party | Candidate | Votes | % | ±% |
|---|---|---|---|---|
| NDP | Steve Cardiff | 334 | 39.7% | +6.0% |
| Yukon Party | Darcy Tkachuk | 271 | 32.2% | +10.8% |
| Liberal | Cynthia Tucker | 236 | 28.1% | -16.9% |
| Total | | 841 | 100.0% | – |

=== 2000 ===
2000 Yukon general election
| Party | Candidate | Votes | % | ±% |
|---|---|---|---|---|
| Liberal | Cynthia Tucker | 563 | 44.9% | +19.9% |
| NDP | Lois Moorcroft | 422 | 33.7% | -6.8% |
| Yukon Party | Ken Gabb | 269 | 21.4% | +0.8% |
| Total | | 1254 | 100.0% | – |

=== 1996 ===
1996 Yukon general election
| Party | Candidate | Votes | % | ±% |
|---|---|---|---|---|
| NDP | Lois Moorcroft | 484 | 40.5% | +5.7% |
| Liberal | Ken Taylor | 299 | 25.0% | +15.2% |
| Yukon Party | Allan Doherty | 247 | 20.6 | -12.6% |
| Independent | Allen Luheck | 166 | 13.9 | -8.3% |
| Total | | 1196 | 100.0% | – |

=== 1992 ===
1992 Yukon general election
| Party | Candidate | Votes | % | ±% |
|---|---|---|---|---|
| NDP | Lois Moorcroft | 316 | 34.8% | – |
| Yukon Party | Chuck Walker | 302 | 33.2% | – |
| Independent | Barb Harris | 202 | 22.2% | – |
| Liberal | Roger Moore | 89 | 9.8% | – |
| Total | | 909 | 100.0% | – |

== See also ==
- List of Yukon territorial electoral districts
- Canadian provincial electoral districts
