= Hilton Rosemarin =

Canadian set director

- Born: June 16, 1952; Montreal, Quebec, Canada
- Died: May 8, 2011 (aged 58); Toronto, Ontario, Canada
- Occupation: Set decorator

Hilton J. Rosemarin (June 16, 1952 – May 8, 2011) was a Canadian set decorator.

== Career ==
Rosemarin was born in Montreal, Quebec, on June 16, 1952, to Samson and Anne Rosemarin. He studied technical theatre at Ryerson Polytechnical Institute in Toronto, Ontario. His first film as a set decorator was on 1975's Sudden Fury. His first major Hollywood film was Raw Deal, starring Arnold Schwarzenegger. His work was rewarded with a Set Decorators Society of America Career Achievement Award.

== Illness and death ==
Rosemarin died of brain cancer on May 8, 2011, at his home in Toronto. He was survived by his wife Phillipa and two daughters.

== Filmography ==
- Sudden Fury (1975)
- Middle Age Crazy (1980)
- Incubus (1981)
- Class of 1984 (1982)
- Mrs. Soffel (1984)
- Joshua Then and Now (1985)
- Raw Deal (1986)
- The Bedroom Window (1987)
- Three Men and a Baby (1987)
- A Night in the Life of Jimmy Reardon (1988)
- Cocktail (1988)
- Everybody Wins (1990)
- Mermaids (1990)
- This Is My Life (1992)
- Used People (1992)
- Made in America (1993)
- Iron Will (1994)
- The Quick and the Dead (1995)
- Bogus (1996)
- The Ghost and the Darkness (1996)
- Booty Call (1997)
- The Horse Whisperer (1998)
- A Simple Plan (1998)
- The Adventures of Rocky and Bullwinkle (2000)
- Rollerball (2002)
- Murder by Numbers (2002)
- xXx (2002)
- Hellboy (2004)
- XXX: State of the Union (2005)
- Jumper (2008)
- Street Kings (2008)
- Marley & Me (2008)
- Zookeeper (2011, posthumous release)
