= Face of Canada =

Face of Canada is an art exhibition displaying paintings of notable Canadians. It was showcased on July 1, 2011, at Canada Place in Vancouver, displaying over 100 oil portraits of notable individuals, both past and present, that helped shape the nation.

== Artist ==
The concept was derived by Canadian artist, William Lameire. Born in Vancouver, September 2, 1966, Lameire traveled to 49 countries studying art. Painting impressionist landscapes professionally, in an array of mediums over the past 10 years, Lameire turned his interest to portraiture work in oil. After seeing Team Canada win the men's hockey in the 2010 Olympic Games and feeling a sense of national pride, he started the 'Great Canadians,' a small series which eventually led to the Face of Canada. After much research, Meire realized the great number of notable Canadians who have shaped and changed the nation, and affected many lives. On July 1, 2011, crowds came to see the one-day solo exhibition of over 100 oil portraits at Canada Place, which has now become part of Canada's national heritage.

== Subjects ==
The exhibition includes numerous portraits, including:

Scientists

- Sir Frederick Banting, one of the main discoverers of insulin
- David Suzuki, scientist and humanitarian

Athletes

- Terry Fox, amputee who attempted to run cross-country, and raised $500 million for cancer research
- Bobby Orr, hockey player
- Wayne Gretzky, hockey player
- Donovan Bailey, sprinter
- Nancy Greene, Olympic skier

Media

- Jack Kerouac, leader of the Beat movement
- Neil Young, musician
- Geddy Lee, musician
- Celine Dion, vocalist
- Sarah McLachlan, vocalist
- Shania Twain, vocalist
- Peter Jennings, television news anchor
- Morley Safer, television news anchor
- John Candy, actor
- Jim Carrey, actor
- Rachel McAdams, actor
- Donald Sutherland, actor
- Kiefer Sutherland, actor
- Keanu Reeves, actor
- Michael J. Fox, actor
- Matthew Perry, actor
- Raymond Burr, actor
- Lorne Greene, actor
- Jack L. Warner, founder of Warner Brothers
