= Cynthia Tucker (politician) =

Canadian politician

MLA for Mount Lorne
- In office 2000–2002
- Preceded by: Lois Moorcroft
- Succeeded by: Steve Cardiff

Personal details
- Born: 1954 (age 71–72) Ontario
- Party: Liberal

Cynthia Tucker (born 1954) is a Canadian politician. She represented the electoral district of Mount Lorne in the Yukon Legislative Assembly from 2000 to 2002. She was a member of the Yukon Liberal Party.
