= Tillie Taylor =

Canadian judge (1922–2011)

- Born: Tillie Goldenberg; November 11, 1922
- Died: October 23, 2011 (aged 88)
- Occupation: Judge
- Known for: Saskatchewan's first female magistrate

Tille Taylor (November 11, 1922 – October 23, 2011) was a Canadian judge who was known for being Saskatchewan's first female magistrate. She also was an advocate for social justice in areas such as poverty, women's rights and prison reform, and in 1972 she was named the first chair of the Saskatchewan Human Rights Commission.

== Life and career ==
She was born Tillie Goldenberg, to J. M. and Sarah Goldenberg in 1922. J. M. was a Saskatoon lawyer. She received her Bachelor of Arts degree from the University of Saskatchewan in 1941. Later, after having married and after her two children were born, she returned to studies and obtained her LLB in 1956. She was the only woman in her class.

She met her husband George Taylor while both were volunteering in the Youth Congress movement in the 1930s; her parents initially disapproved because George and his family were communists. They married in 1941. George completed his law degree while Tillie supported him working as a secretary. He went on to become a well-respected labour lawyer, and for part of his career worked in Tillie's father's firm. George and Tillie continued to be involved in politics, supporting the Co-operative Commonwealth Federation (later, the New Democratic Party).

After law school, she worked in the Saskatoon Land Titles Office, as deputy registrar. In 1959, she became the first woman to be appointed as a provincial magistrate in Saskatchewan. She might also have been the first Jew to be named magistrate, but that is less clear. Presiding over misdemeanours, she became more aware of the association between crime and poverty, and began to push for reforms, through such organizations as the John Howard Society, the Medical Care Insurance Commission of Saskatchewan, and the Provincial Commission of Inquiry into Legal Aid. Collaborating with Roger Carter, the law school dean at the University of Saskatchewan, she helped to build opportunities for Aboriginal people to enter the field of law.

When the Saskatchewan Human Rights Commission was created in 1972, she was named its first chair. There was criticism that she had named abortion as a human right, but neither she nor the commission as a whole gave in to the pressure to remove it. In 1976 she was elected as a director on the Canadian Research Institute for the Advancement of Women. From 1977 to 1987, she served on the board of governors of the Canadian Council on Social Development.

Taylor suffered a severe stroke in 1995, but recovered much of her lost speech and mobility, despite a poor prognosis initially. She died at the age of 88, on October 23, 2011.
