= 2020 Yukon Party leadership election =

Yukon Party leadership election

- May 23, 2020
- Turnout: 96%
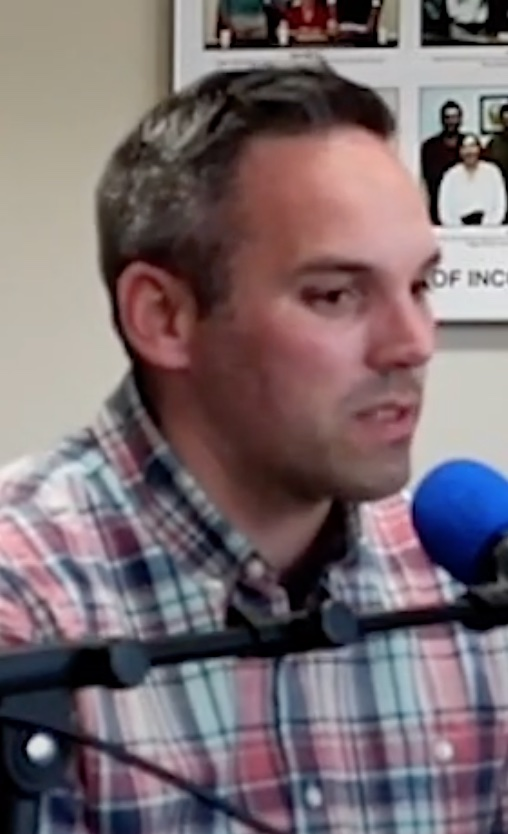

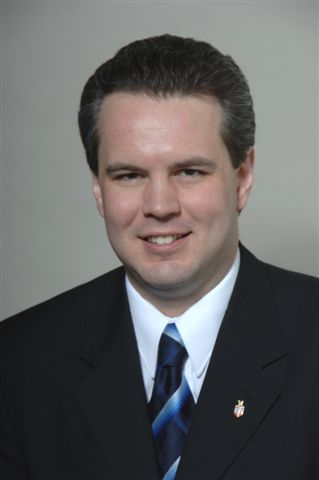
			LB
Candidate	Currie Dixon	Brad Cathers	Linda Benoit
Riding	N/A (Note: Former MLA for Copperbelt North (2011–2016))	Lake Laberge	N/A (Note: Resident of Faro.)
Second ballot	752 (50.44%)	682 (45.74%)	Eliminated
First ballot	694 (46.55%)	637 (42.72%)	160 (10.73%)
Leader before election
Stacey Hassard (interim)
Elected Leader
Currie Dixon

2020 Yukon Party leadership election
- Date: May 23, 2020
- Convention: Gold Rush Inn, Whitehorse, Yukon
- Resigning leader: Darrell Pasloski
- Won by: Currie Dixon
- Ballots: 1,491

The 2020 Yukon Party leadership election took place on May 23, 2020, to elect a leader to replace Darrell Pasloski, who resigned on November 7, 2016 after the 2016 Yukon general election, which resulted in the party's majority government being defeated and Pasloski losing re-election in Mountainview. Currie Dixon was elected after two ballots with a record turnout of 96% of registered Yukon Party voters.

== Timeline ==
=== 2016 ===
- November 7 - The general election is held, reducing the party's seat count from 11 to 6. Pasloski announces his resignation as leader.
- November 17 - Stacey Hassard, MLA for Pelly-Nisutlin and former minister of economic development, is named the interim leader of the party until a leadership election is held.

=== 2019 ===
- 20 November - The election date is announced for May 23, 2020.
- 21 November - Currie Dixon, former cabinet minister and former MLA for Copperbelt North, announces his candidacy.
- 5 December - Brad Cathers, MLA for Lake Laberge, former cabinet minister and the longest-serving incumbent MLA, announces his candidacy.

=== 2020 ===
- 14 January - Linda Benoit, former party president and treasurer, announces her candidacy.
- 25 March - Party president Mark Beese announces that the leadership election will continue despite the ongoing coronavirus pandemic, opting to instead allow members to vote by phone or online.
- 9 April at 6:00 PM PDT - Deadline to purchase membership to vote in leadership election.
- 15 May - Voting opens both by phone and online.
- 23 May
  - In-person voting opened at 10:00 AM PDT.
  - Voting closed at 7:00 PM PDT.
  - Currie Dixon is announced as the new leader at 8:00 PM PDT.

== Candidates ==
=== Linda Benoit ===
Background

Linda Benoit, 38, is a businesswoman from Faro who is a former party president, party treasurer, and official agent.

Candidacy announced: 14 January 2020
Candidacy approved: 6 March 2020
Date registered with Elections Yukon:
Campaign website: lindabenoit.ca

Policies

Endorsements of Linda Benoit

MLAs:
Federal politicians:

- Jonas Smith (Executive director of the Klondike Placer Miners' Association, former party president, 2019 federal Conservative candidate in Yukon)

Provincial and territorial politicians:
Municipal politicians:
Former MLAs:
Former federal politicians:
Former provincial and territorial politicians:
Former municipal politicians:
Former candidates:
Other prominent individuals:
Organizations:
Media:

=== Brad Cathers ===
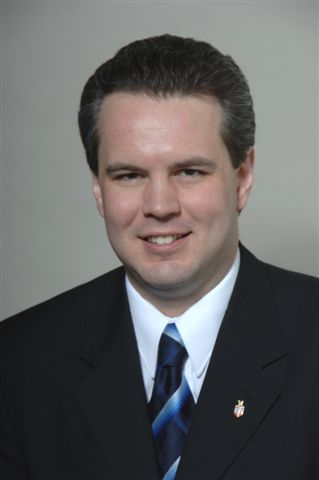
Brad Cathers

Background

Brad Cathers, 42, is the incumbent MLA for Lake Laberge, having served since 2002. He is a former cabinet minister, having served under both Dennis Fentie and Darrell Pasloski for a cumulative eight years; his portfolios include justice, health and energy. Prior to his election as an MLA, Cathers worked as a businessman in the private sector.

Candidacy announced: 5 December 2019
Candidacy approved: 6 March 2020
Date registered with Elections Yukon:
Campaign website: bradcathers.ca

Policies

Endorsements of Brad Cathers

MLAs:
Federal politicians:
Provincial and territorial politicians:
Municipal politicians:
Former MLAs:
Former federal politicians:
Former provincial and territorial politicians:
Former municipal politicians:
Former candidates:
Other prominent individuals:

- Rob McIntyre (Principal of Resource Strategies)

Organizations:
Media:

=== Currie Dixon ===
Background

Currie Dixon, 34, is the former MLA for Copperbelt North and cabinet minister, having served from 2011 to 2016. He is currently the director of strategic partnerships at ALX Exploration and Mining Supplies.

Candidacy announced: 21 November 2019
Candidacy approved: 6 March 2020
Date registered with Elections Yukon:
Campaign website: curriedixon.ca

Policies

Endorsements of Currie Dixon

MLAs:

- Scott Kent (MLA for Copperbelt South)

Federal politicians:
Provincial and territorial politicians:
Municipal politicians:
Former MLAs:
Former federal politicians:
Former provincial and territorial politicians:
Former municipal politicians:
Former candidates:
Other prominent individuals:
Organizations:
Media:

== Declined ==
- Scott Kent, MLA for Copperbelt South (2016–present), Riverdale North (2011–2016), Riverside (2001–2002). Endorsed Dixon.
- Darrell Pasloski, former party leader (2011–2016), former premier (2011–2016), former MLA for Mountainview (2011–2016).
- Jonas Smith, executive director of the Klondike Placer Miners' Association, former party president, 2019 federal Conservative candidate in Yukon. Endorsed Benoit.
- Elaine Taylor, former deputy premier (2005–2016), former cabinet minister, former MLA for Whitehorse West (2002–2016).
- Geraldine Van Bibber, MLA for Porter Creek North (2016–2025), former commissioner of Yukon (2005–2010).

== Results ==
Results by ballot
Candidate	Round 1		Round 2	
Candidate	Points	%	Points	%
Currie Dixon	694	46.55%	752	50.44%
Brad Cathers	637	45.74%	682	42.72%
Linda Benoit	160	10.73%		
