= Patrick Rouble =

Canadian politician

Minister of Education
- In office October 28, 2006 – November 5, 2011
- Premier: Dennis Fentie; Darrell Pasloski
- Preceded by: Elaine Taylor
- Succeeded by: Scott Kent

Minister of Energy, Mines and Resources
- In office February 4, 2010 – November 5, 2011
- Premier: Dennis Fentie; Darrell Pasloski
- Preceded by: Archie Lang
- Succeeded by: Brad Cathers

Minister of the Public Service Commission
- In office July 3, 2008 – February 4, 2010
- Premier: Dennis Fentie
- Preceded by: Glenn Hart
- Succeeded by: Elaine Taylor

MLA for Southern Lakes
- In office November 4, 2002 – October 11, 2011
- Preceded by: Constituency established
- Succeeded by: Constituency dissolved

Personal details
- Born: Renfrew, Ontario
- Party: Yukon Party
- Occupation: Proprietor

Patrick Rouble is a Canadian politician, who represented the rural Yukon electoral district of Southern Lakes in the Yukon Legislative Assembly from 2002 to 2011. He served as a Cabinet minister in Yukon Premier Dennis Fentie's government from 2006 to 2011, and then briefly in the Cabinet of Premier Darrell Pasloski until his retirement from territorial politics in 2011.

== Political career ==
Rouble was elected as MLA for the newly created riding of Southern Lakes on November 4, 2002. He joined a majority government under leader Dennis Fentie, whose Yukon Party had just defeated the Liberals. Rouble served as a backbench MLA in his first term and Deputy Speaker of the Legislative Assembly, as well as Yukon Party Caucus Chair.

He was re-elected in the 2006 Yukon election and this time elevated to Cabinet as Minister of Education. He was sworn in on October 28, 2006. He remained Minister of Education throughout his second term, serving both Premier Fentie and his successor, Darrell Pasloski. Rouble's mandate as Education minister was criticized by the media, with the Yukon News commenting that Rouble "made a fetish of hiring consultants to produce reports long on abstract gobbledegook and short on concrete goals." Rouble - and his department - was also criticized for his department's inability to demonstrated that the education of Yukon students had improved. As Minister of Education, he also oversaw and approved the decision to replace the F.H. Collins High School in Whitehorse, a decision that eventually went millions over budget and resulted in a half decade of delays.

In Cabinet, Rouble also briefly held the portfolio overseeing the Yukon Public Service Commission from 2008 to 2010. He was appointed Minister of Energy, Mines and Resources in February 2010 when Yukon Party Cabinet minister Brad Cathers temporarily quit the Yukon Party in protest over Premier Fentie's leadership. Rouble held the position of Minister of Energy, Mines and Resources until the end of that term.

In 2011, Rouble announced that he would not seek re-election in the 2011 Yukon election, choosing instead to pursue a doctorate degree in education. His surprise departure led to media speculation that he was unhappy with the resulting change in the leadership within the Yukon Party. Rouble had refused to state who he would support in the leadership race to replace Dennis Fentie, but it was thought he harboured his own leadership ambitions.

In 2025, Rouble ran for the Conservative Party of Canada nomination in the riding of Yukon, losing to Ryan Leef.

== Yukon Land Use Planning Council ==
After retiring from politics, Rouble was appointed by Premier Pasloski as the Chair of the Yukon Land Use Planning Council, the body under the Yukon's Umbrella Final Agreement responsible for making recommendations to the Yukon Government on land use planning. The appointment drew disdain from the opposition and the media, since as Minister of Energy, Mines and Resources, Rouble had worked to undermine the recommendations of the Council's Peel Watershed Commission after six years of public consultations. There was concern that Rouble prejudiced the independent mandate of the Council and could weaken government relations with First Nations. Both the Yukon News and members of the opposition called upon Rouble to recuse himself of the appointment, which he did not. The process surrounding the Peel Watershed Commission eventually led to a legal challenge at the Supreme Court of Canada in 2017.

== Personal life ==
Rouble, born in Renfrew and raised in Nepean, attended St. Lawrence College in Kingston, Ontario. He holds a Master of Business Administration from Royal Roads University in Victoria, British Columbia and pursued his doctoral degree from the University of Calgary in education after quitting politics.

Rouble has lived in the Yukon since 1992 and resides with his wife in Marsh Lake, Yukon. Prior to entering territorial politics, he served on the Marsh Lake Advisory Council and was a small business owner.

== Electoral record ==
=== Yukon general election, 2006 ===
Southern Lakes
Party	Candidate	Votes	%	±%
Yukon Party	Patrick Rouble	276	42.4%	+2.5%
NDP	Kevin Barr	238	36.6%	+3.2%
Liberal	Ethel Tizya	134	20.6%	+2.0%
Total		651	100.0%	–

=== Yukon general election, 2002 ===
Southern Lakes
Party	Candidate	Votes	%	±%
Yukon Party	Patrick Rouble	227	39.9%	–
NDP	Rachael Lewis	190	33.4%	–
Liberal	Manfred Janssen	106	18.6%	–
Independent	Warren Braunberger	41	7.2%	–
Total		569	100.0%	–
