= 2025 Canadian federal election in the territories =

- April 28, 2025

All 3 territorial seats in the House of Commons
- Registered: 82,237
- Turnout: 46,994 (57.15%)
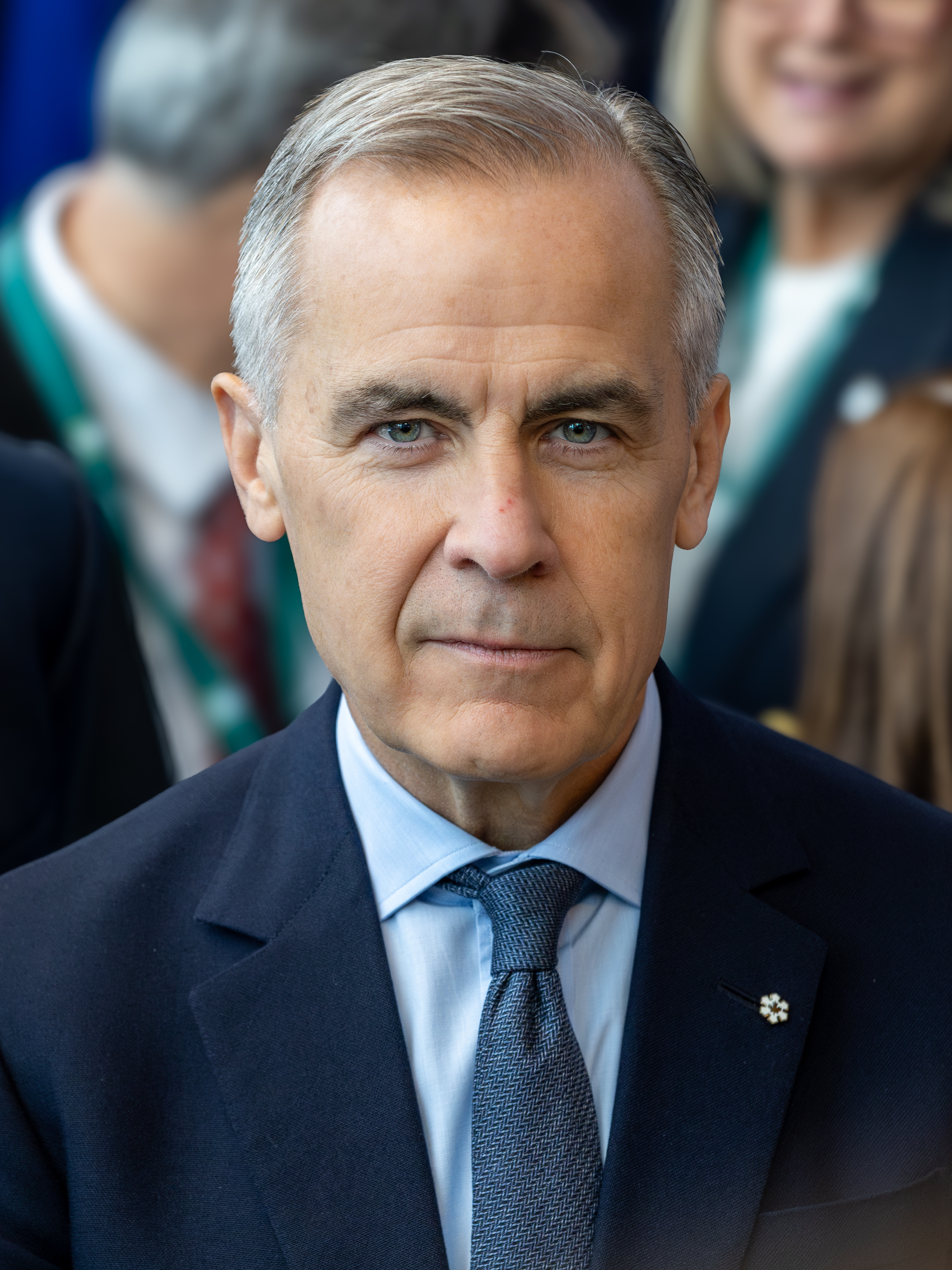

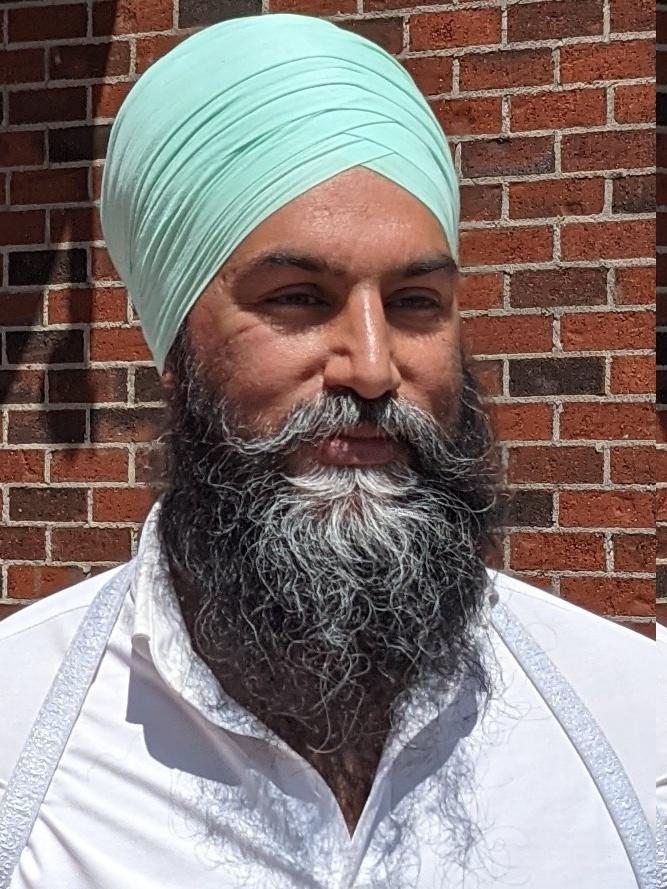

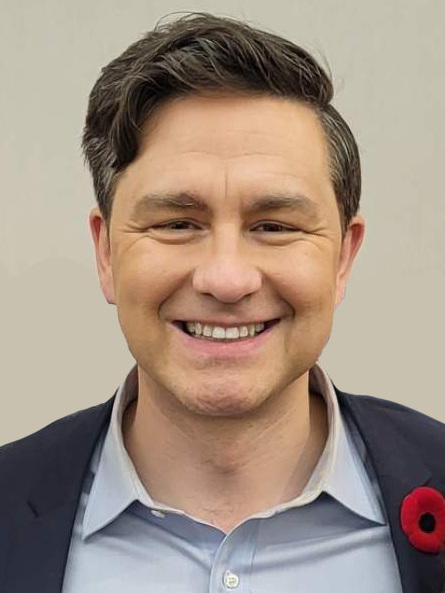
	First party	Second party	Third party
Leader	Mark Carney	Jagmeet Singh	Pierre Poilievre
Party	Liberal	New Democratic	Conservative
Leader since	March 9, 2025	October 1, 2017	September 10, 2022
Last election	2 seats, 35.48%	1 seat, 30.32%	0 seats, 20.43%
Seats before	2	1	0
Seats won	2	1	0
Seat change	0	0	0
Popular vote	23,741	6,367	16,241
Percentage	50.52	13.55	34.56
Swing	▲15.04pp	▼16.77pp	▲14.13pp

Liberal
30–35%
35–40%
40–45%
45–50%
50–55%
55–60%
60–65%
65–70%
>70%
New Democratic
30–35%
35–40%
40–45%
45–50%
50–55%
55–60%
60–65%
65–70%
>70%
Conservative
30–35%
35–40%
40–45%
45–50%
50–55%
55–60%
60–65%
65–70%
>70%
Prime Minister before election
Mark Carney
Liberal
Prime Minister after election
Mark Carney
Liberal

In the 2025 Canadian federal election, there was 1 member of Parliament in each of Canada's 3 territories elected to the House of Commons, making up 0.9% of all members of the House.

== Results ==
None of the seats changed hands. The Liberal Party won the seats of Northwest Territories and Yukon, increasing their overall vote share to 50.52%. While the New Democratic Party won the seat of Nunavut, with their total vote share decreasing to 13.55% of the vote. The Conservative Party got the second most votes between the 3 territories, with 34.56%, but didn't win any of the seats. The Greens received 1.37%, and didn't run a candidate in Nunavut.

Territorial summary seat results in the 2025 Canadian federal election
Party	Votes	Vote %	Vote +/-	Seats	Seat +/-
Liberal	23,741	50.52%	▲15.04pp	2 / 3 (67%)	0
New Democratic	6,367	13.55%	▼16.77pp	1 / 3 (33%)	0
Conservative	16,241	34.56%	▲14.13pp	0 / 3 (0%)	0
Green	645	1.37%	▼1.52pp	0 / 3 (0%)	0
Total	46,994	100%	–	3 / 3 (100%)	–

== Yukon ==
Results showing the most-voted party in each Yukon Legislative Assembly electoral district.

2025 Canadian federal election: Yukon
** Preliminary results — Not yet official **
Party	Candidate	Votes	%	±%	Expenditures
Liberal	Brendan Hanley	12,019	53.05	+19.70	
Conservative	Ryan Leef	8,724	38.51	+12.25	
New Democratic	Katherine McCallum	1,439	6.35	–16.09	
Green	Gabrielle Dupont	474	2.09	–2.27	
Total valid votes/expense limit		22,636	99.45		
Total rejected ballots		125	0.55		
Turnout		22,761	73.9		
Eligible voters		30,764			
Liberal hold		Swing		+3.73	
Source: Elections Canada

=== By Region (Note: Yukon is not officially divided in regions. For the purposes of this table, the Territorial Assembly ridings are used as regions, except for the ones in the Whitehorse area which have been combined.) ===
Region	Lib		Con		NDP		Green		Total	
Region	Votes	%	Votes	%	Votes	%	Votes	%	Votes	Turnout
Klondike	409	45.4	373	41.4	89	9.9	29	3.2	900	57.6%
Kluane	303	46.2	286	43.6	53	8.1	14	2.1	656	73.1%
Mayo-Tatchun	251	47.8	206	39.2	53	10.1	17	3.2	525	51.5%
Southern Lakes	448	46.8	404	42.2	66	6.9	40	4.2	958	77.9%
Vuntut Gwitchin	47	58.0	19	23.5	12	14.8	3	3.7	81	48.2%
Watson Lake-Ross River-Faro	313	41.1	395	51.9	43	5.7	10	1.3	761	53.9%
Whitehorse	7,011	53.3	5,039	38.3	843	6.4	265	2.0	13,160	53.3%
Special votes	3,227	57.7	1,997	35.7	275	4.9	96	1.7	5,595	–

== Northwest Territories ==
Results showing the most-voted party in each Legislative Assembly of the Northwest Territories electoral district.

2025 Canadian federal election: Northwest Territories
Party	Candidate	Votes	%	±%	Expenditures
Liberal	Rebecca Alty	8,855	53.51	+15.29	
Conservative	Kimberly Fairman	5,513	33.31	+18.90	
New Democratic	Kelvin Kotchilea	2,011	12.15	–20.19	
Green	Rainbow Eyes	170	1.03	–1.30	
Total valid votes/expense limit		16,549			
Total rejected ballots		199			
Turnout		16,748	54.72		
Eligible voters		30,097			
Liberal hold		Swing		–1.61	
Source: CBC, Elections Canada

=== By Region ===
Region	Lib		Con		NDP		Green		Total	
Region	Votes	%	Votes	%	Votes	%	Votes	%	Votes	Turnout
Dehcho	329	50.5	206	31.6	104	16.0	12	1.8	651	72.6%
Inuvik	830	59.5	393	28.2	150	10.8	21	1.5	1,394	32.7%
North Slave	4,541	53.3	2,848	33.5	1,051	12.3	72	0.8	8,512	47.3%
Sahtu	290	49.2	179	30.4	110	18.7	10	1.7	589	39.6%
South Slave	1,414	49.4	1,112	38.8	308	10.8	29	1.0	2,863	53.2%
Special votes	1,451	57.1	775	30.5	288	11.3	26	1.0	2,540	–

== Nunavut ==
Results showing the most-voted party in each Legislative Assembly of Nunavut electoral district.

2025 Canadian federal election: Nunavut
Party	Candidate	Votes	%	±%	Expenditures
New Democratic	Lori Idlout	2,853	37.26	–10.41	
Liberal	Kilikvak Kabloona	2,812	36.72	+0.86	
Conservative	James T. Arreak	1,992	26.02	+9.55	
Total valid votes/expense limit		7,657			
Total rejected ballots		90			
Turnout		7,747	36.24		
Eligible voters		21,376			
New Democratic hold		Swing		−6.09	
Source: CBC, Elections Canada

=== By Region ===
Region	NDP		Lib		Con		Total	
Region	Votes	%	Votes	%	Votes	%	Votes	Turnout
Kitikmeot	416	37.5	348	31.4	346	31.2	1,110	28.2%
Kivalliq	379	26.3	620	43.1	440	30.6	1,439	26.6%
Qikiqtaaluk	1,912	42.9	1,590	35.7	951	21.4	4,453	37.7%
Special votes	146	22.3	254	38.8	255	38.9	655	–

== Comparison with national results ==
Results by party
Party	Popular vote %			Seats in caucus
Party	T	Natl.	diff.	Seats in caucus
Liberal	50.5	43.7	+6.8	2 / 169 (1%)
Conservative	34.6	41.3	-6.7	0 / 144 (0%)
New Democratic	13.6	6.3	+7.3	1 / 7 (14%)
Green	1.4	1.2	+0.2	0 / 1 (0%)
Total	–	–	–	3 / 343 (0.9%)

== Student vote results ==
Student votes are mock elections that run parallel to actual elections, in which students not of voting age participate. They are administered by Student Vote Canada. These are for educational purposes and do not count towards the results.

Summary of the 2025 Canadian Student Vote in the territories
Party	Leader	Seats			Popular vote		
Party	Leader	Elected	%	Δ	Votes	%	Δ (pp)
Liberal	Mark Carney	2	66.67	▲2	1,564	40.81	▲13.23
New Democratic	Jagmeet Singh	1	33.33	▼2	824	21.50	▼13.07
Conservative	Pierre Poilievre	0	0	0	1,059	27.64	▲9.15
Green	Elizabeth May & Jonathan Pedneault	0	0	0	385	10.05	▼0.84
Total		3	100.00	0	3,832	100.00	–
Source: Student Vote Canada

== See also ==
- 2025 Yukon general election
- 2025 Nunavut general election
