= Southern Lakes (electoral district) =

Former territorial electoral district in the Yukon, Canada

Yukon electoral district
- Interactive map of riding boundaries

Territorial electoral district
- Legislature: Yukon Legislative Assembly
MLA
Tyler Porter
Yukon Party
- District created: 2002
- First contested: 2002
- Last contested: 2025

Demographics
- Electors (2006): 849
- Census subdivision(s): Carcross, Tagish, Marsh Lake, Jake's Corner, Judas Creek

Southern Lakes is an electoral district in rural Yukon which returns a member (known as an MLA) to the Legislative Assembly of the Yukon in Canada. In accordance with the Yukon Electoral District Boundaries Act (2024), it was first contested at the 2025 Yukon general election.

== Geography ==
The riding is part of the traditional territory of the Carcross/Tagish First Nation, the Teslin Tlingit Council, the Kwanlin Dün First Nation, and the Ta'an Kwach'an Council. It was bordered by the rural ridings of Pelly-Nisutlin, Kluane, and Lake Laberge, as well as the rural-residential riding of Mount Lorne south of Whitehorse.

== History ==
Southern Lakes was originally created as part of the 2002 Electoral Boundaries Commission when the riding of Ross River-Southern Lakes was divided into the ridings of Southern Lakes and Pelly-Nisutlin. Southern Lakes retained the communities of Carcross and Tagish and merged with the bedroom community of Marsh Lake.

In the 2009 electoral redistribution, the riding was dissolved, combining with the Hamlet of Mount Lorne to form the new riding of Mount Lorne-Southern Lakes.

In accordance with the Yukon Electoral District Boundaries Act (2024), Mount Lorne-Southern Lakes was split into Marsh Lake-Mount Lorne-Golden Horn and Southern Lakes at the 2025 Yukon general election.

== Members of the Legislative Assembly ==
Assembly	Years	Member	Party
Southern Lakes; Riding created from Ross River-Southern Lakes
31st	2002–2006	Patrick Rouble	Yukon Party
32nd	2006–2011	Patrick Rouble	Yukon Party
Riding dissolved into Mount Lorne-Southern Lakes
Riding re-created from Mount Lorne-Southern Lakes
36th	2025–present	Tyler Porter	Yukon Party

== Election results ==
=== 2025 ===
2025 Yukon general election
Party	Candidate	Votes	%	±%
Liberal	Cynthia James			
Yukon Party	Tyler Porter			
New Democratic	Tip Evans			
Independent	Jean-Michel Harvey			
Total valid votes				
Total rejected ballots				
Turnout				
Eligible voters				
Source(s) "Unofficial Election Results 2025". Elections Yukon.

2021 Yukon general election redistributed results
Party	Votes	%
Yukon Party	287	41
New Democratic	226	32
Liberal	187	27

=== 2006 ===
2006 Yukon general election
Party	Candidate	Votes	%	±%
Yukon Party	Patrick Rouble	276	42.4%	+2.5%
NDP	Kevin Barr	238	36.6%	+3.2%
Liberal	Ethel Tizya	134	20.6%	+2.0%
Total		651	100.0%	–

=== 2002 ===
2002 Yukon general election
Party	Candidate	Votes	%	±%
Yukon Party	Patrick Rouble	227	39.9%	–
NDP	Rachael Lewis	190	33.4%	–
Liberal	Manfred Janssen	106	18.6%	–
Independent	Warren Braunberger	41	7.2%	–
Total		569	100.0%	–

== See also ==
- List of Yukon territorial electoral districts
- Canadian provincial electoral districts
