= Ted Adel =

Canadian politician

Member of the Yukon Legislative Assembly for Copperbelt North
- In office November 7, 2016 – March 12, 2021
- Preceded by: Currie Dixon
- Succeeded by: Currie Dixon

Personal details
- Party: Liberal
- Education: Wilfrid Laurier University (BA)

Ted Adel is a Canadian politician, who was elected to the Legislative Assembly of Yukon in the 2016 election. He represented the electoral district of Copperbelt North as a member of the Yukon Liberal Party untl his defeat in the 2021 Yukon general election.

Adel worked for Canada Post and held executive positions within the Canadian Union of Postal Workers before retiring in 2007. He worked as a real estate agent and for the Yukon Liquor Corporation before entering territorial politics.

He has a Bachelor of Arts from Wilfrid Laurier University.

Adel first ran unsuccessfully in the rural riding of Mount Lorne-Southern Lakes for the Yukon Liberal Party in the 2011 Yukon election, losing to New Democrat Kevin Barr. Adel was elected on November 7, 2016, as MLA for the Whitehorse riding of Copperbelt North as part of the Liberal majority government, narrowly defeating Yukon Party president Pat McInroy. He served as a member of the Standing Committee on Public Accounts, the Standing Committee on Rules, Elections and Privileges, the Standing Committee on Statutory Instruments and the Standing Committee on Appointments to Major Government Boards and Committees.

== Electoral record ==
2021 Yukon general election: Copperbelt North
Party	Candidate	Votes	%	±%
Yukon Party	Currie Dixon	717	51.91	+9.8
Liberal	Ted Adel	346	25.05	-20.0
New Democratic	Saba Javed	318	23.02	+10.2
Total valid votes		1,381		
Total rejected ballots				
Turnout				
Eligible voters				
Yukon Party gain		Swing		-13.43
Source(s) "Unofficial Election Results 2021". Elections Yukon.

=== 2016 general election ===
Copperbelt North
Party	Candidate	Votes	%	±%
Liberal	Ted Adel	566	45.1%	+10.8%
Yukon Party	Pat McInroy	529	42.1%	-1.7%
NDP	André Bourcier	161	12.8%	-0.6%
Total		1256	100.0%	–

=== 2011 general election ===
Mount Lorne-Southern Lakes
Party	Candidate	Votes	%	±%
NDP	Kevin Barr	488	46.8%	–
Yukon Party	Deborah Fulmer	395	37.9%	–
Liberal	Ted Adel	111	10.6%	–
First Nations Party	Stanley James	49	4.7%	–
Total		1043	100.0%	–
