= Ta'an Kwach'an Council =

The Ta'an Kwach'an Council or Ta'an Kwäch’än Council is a self-governing Indigenous government whose traditional territory is located around the Whitehorse and Lake Laberge area in Canada's Yukon Territory. It split from the Kwanlin Dün First Nation (Whitehorse Indian Band) to negotiate a separate land claim. The language originally spoken by the Ta’an Kwäch’än was Southern Tutchone. The Ta’an Kwäch’än comprise people of Southern Tutchone, Tagish and Tlingit descent. Approximately 50 per cent of the Ta’an Kwäch’än citizens now live in Whitehorse, Yukon Territory, with the balance disbursed throughout the rest of Canada, in the United States of America (mostly Alaska), and abroad. The Ta'an Kwäch’än take their name from Tàa'an Män (Lake Laberge) in the heart of their traditional territory - so they called themselves ″People from Lake Laberge″.

Their ancestral lands extended north to Hootalinqua (Northern Tutchone: Hudinlin - ″running against the mountain″) at the confluence of the Yukon River and Teslin River (Tutchone: Délin Chú; Tlingit: Deisleen Héeni), south to Marsh Lake, west to White Bank Village at the confluence of the Takhini River and Little River, and east to Winter Crossing on the Teslin River.

The Ta'an Kwach'an Council signed a Yukon Land Claims agreement in 2002.

== See also ==
- Jim Boss
