= Jim Boss =

First Nations chief and trader (1871–1950)

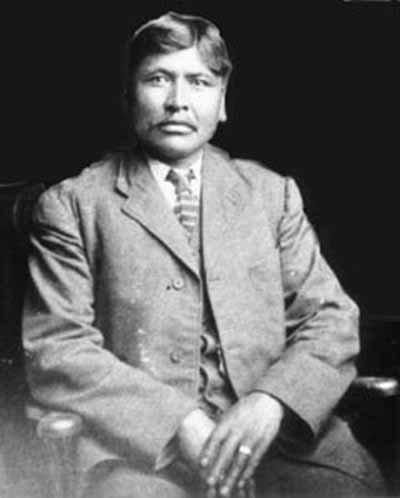
Portrait of Chief Jim Boss

Jim Boss (1871 – 17 January 1950) (also called Kashxoot, Kishwoot, meaning "pound the table with fist," and Hundealth) was an entrepreneur and the chief of the Southern Tutchone Ta’an Kwäch’än for over 40 years. He is most known for having initiated the first Yukon land claim, in 1902. His leadership allowed the First Nations from the southern region of the Yukon to make the transition from a traditional way of life to a Euro-Canadian economy. In 2001, he was designated a Person of National Historic Significance.

== Biography ==
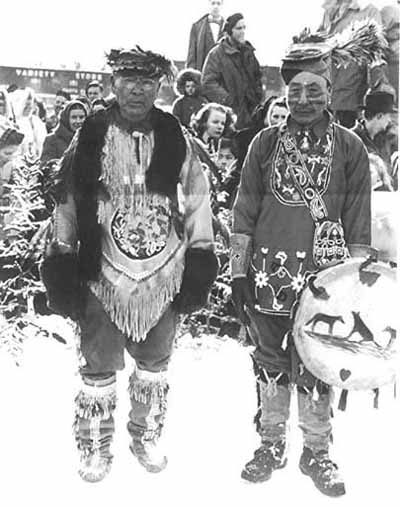
Chief Jim Boss of Lebarge and Chief John Fraser of Champagne during the 1948 Whitehorse Winter Carnival

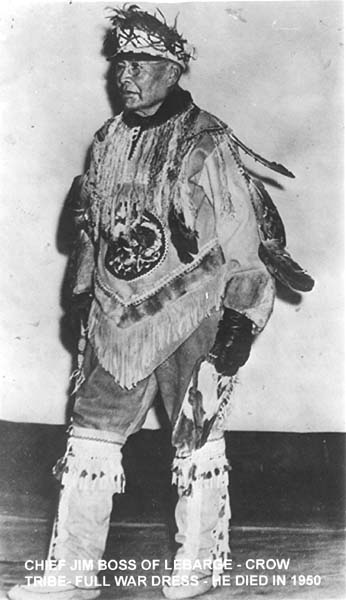
Boss in full war dress, 1950

Jim Boss was born to Mundessa (Old Man Chief) from Hutshi and Łande from Tagish. He had three sisters: Maggie Boss (Shuwateen), Jenny Boss (Tusáxal) and Susie Boss (Shaan Tlein). Jim boss also had a brother named Yandeyelh, no known English name.

His first job was to trade goods between the Coastal and Inland First Nations. At the onset of the Klondike Gold Rush in 1896, in an effort both to preserve his people's rights and to profit, he abandoned his previous profession to set up a roadhouse, with the help of his brother-in-law, Henry Broeren, near Horse Creek to service the sternwheeler traffic on Lake Laberge. This was the first of multiple roadhouses he would come to own. During this time he also had a lumber and fishing operation, and owned the Takhini Hot Springs. In addition, he taught the North-West Mounted Police how to survive in the Yukon.

In 1900, he petitioned the Commissioner of the Yukon for a 1600-acre (647-hectare) reserve for his people, but was granted only 320 acres (129 hectares). Having received less than he wished, he began to draft a petition to the Superintendent of Indian Affairs.

In 1902, Boss employed a Whitehorse lawyer, T.W. Jackson, to communicate with the Government of Canada requesting that they and the King, Edward VII, begin a treaty or land claims discussions with the Yukon First Nations. In a letter to the Superintendent General of Indian Affairs, Boss demanded that Jackson write: "Tell the King very hard, we want something for our Indians because they take our land and game." In his petition he included an estimated census of various tribes. His total was 810, even though before the eight years of the gold rush, there had been several thousand natives. This occurred due to the introduction of smallpox, influenza, measles and tuberculosis through those participating in the gold rush. The plea was denied. It was only in the 1970s, when the issue of First Nation territory was raised again, that Boss' petition was used to assert claims.

In 1914, Kishwoot took his people into the bush outside of Whitehorse in order to escape a 1914 flu outbreak.

By 1915, among the numerous businesses he ran during his life, he also operated one of the Yukon's fifteen fox fur farms.

Boss was married three times. His first marriage was to Kathleen Kitty, whom he had a son, Fred. His second marriage was to Maude, with whom he had four children: Alice, David, Lena and Ned. His third marriage was to Annie, with whom he had two children: Agnes and Sam.

Boss died in hospital after a period of illness on January 17, 1950.

== Legacy ==
On 23 August 2008, minister John Baird and Chief Ruth Massie of the Ta'an Kwäch'än Council unveiled the plaque, placed at Helen's Fish Camp near Lake Laberge, to commemorate Boss. At the event Chief Massie declared:

"It has always been important to our people that Chief Jim Boss be recognized and commemorated for his foresight to look after his people in our homelands forever. Chief Jim Boss was a visionary leader."
