= Currie Dixon =

Canadian politician

The Honourable Currie Dixon MLA
- Dixon in 2026

12th Premier of Yukon
- Incumbent
- Assumed office November 22, 2025
- Deputy: Vacant
- Commissioner: Adeline Webber
- Preceded by: Mike Pemberton

Minister of Finance
- Incumbent
- Assumed office November 22, 2025
- Premier: Himself
- Preceded by: Sandy Silver

Leader of the Yukon Party
- Incumbent
- Assumed office May 23, 2020
- Preceded by: Stacey Hassard (interim)
Other positions
Leader of the Opposition in Yukon
In office April 12, 2021 – November 3, 2025
Preceded by	Stacey Hassard
Succeeded by	Kate White
Minister of Economic Development Minister of the Environment
In office November 5, 2011 – January 16, 2015
Premier	Darrell Pasloski
Preceded by	Steve Nordick; John Edzerza
Succeeded by	Stacey Hassard; Wade Istchenko
Minister of Community Services Minister of the Public Service Commission
In office January 16, 2015 – December 3, 2016
Premier	Darrell Pasloski
Preceded by	Elaine Taylor
Succeeded by	John Streicker; Richard Mostyn

Member of the Yukon Legislative Assembly for Copperbelt North
- Incumbent
- Assumed office April 12, 2021
- Preceded by: Ted Adel
- In office October 11, 2011 – November 7, 2016
- Preceded by: Constituency established
- Succeeded by: Ted Adel

Personal details
- Born: September 2, 1985 (age 41) Whitehorse, Yukon, Canada
- Party: Yukon
- Spouse: Brittany Dixon
- Children: 2
- Education: St. Francis Xavier University (BA (Hons)); University of Northern British Columbia (MA)
- Occupation: Politician

Currie Dixon (born September 2, 1985) is a Canadian politician who has served as the 12th premier of Yukon since 2025 and the leader of the Yukon Party since 2020. The MLA for Copperbelt North since 2021, he previously served as the Leader of the Opposition in Yukon. Dixon was a cabinet minister in the government of Darrell Pasloski and previously represented Copperbelt North as an MLA from 2011 to 2016. Dixon is the first premier to be born in the territory.

== Early life ==
Currie Dixon was born and raised in Whitehorse, Yukon. Dixon holds an undergraduate degree in political science and history from Saint Francis Xavier University, graduating in 2008. He also obtained a graduate degree in political science from the University of Northern British Columbia in 2011, focusing on the relationship between the Yukon and First Nations governments in the area of education.

Dixon worked as a senior policy advisor to the Premier of Yukon in the territory's executive council office after completing university and before entering electoral politics.

== Political career ==
Dixon was elected to the Yukon Legislative Assembly in the 2011 general election, in the newly created riding of Copperbelt North. He defeated Yukon Liberal Party leader Arthur Mitchell for the seat.

He was sworn into the cabinet on November 5, 2011, as the Minister of Environment and Economic Development. He was appointed as Minister of Community Services and the Public Service Commission on January 16, 2015. He is the youngest cabinet minister in Yukon history and among the youngest in Canadian history.

On June 15, 2016, Dixon announced that he would not seek a second term as MLA of Copperbelt North.

On December 5, 2019, Dixon announced that he would run in the Yukon Party leadership election, which was to be held on May 23, 2020. He was elected as leader of the Yukon Party on May 23, 2020, replacing Darrell Pasloski, who resigned in November 2016, and interim leader Stacey Hassard; he defeated opponents Linda Benoit and Brad Cathers in two ballots.

Dixon led the party into the 2021 territorial election; the party won 8 seats and the overall popular vote. Dixon was personally elected in the district of Copperbelt North, defeating Ted Adel. However, premier Sandy Silver's incumbent Liberals were sworn in with a minority government, since the NDP announced that they had entered into a formal confidence and supply agreement with the government. Following the election, Dixon became the Leader of the Official Opposition, as well as the critic for the executive council office, the Yukon Liquor Corporation, the Yukon Lottery Corporation, the Yukon Cannabis Corporation, early learning and child care, and the 2027 Canada Winter Games.

=== Premier (2025–present) ===
Dixon led his party to a majority government in the 2025 Yukon general election and was appointed premier on November 22. On the electoral reform plebiscite, Dixon reiterated his party's stance that changes to Yukon's electoral system should have to go through a referendum, while expressing his preference for first-past-the-post. As premier, Dixon also serves as the Minister of Finance and the Executive Council Office.

Dixon's first budget had a record $82 million deficit. He has opened the territorial economy to further mining investment, which has drawn backlash from some Indigenous groups. In May 2026, he signed an Alaska-Yukon Intergovernmental Accord with Governor Mike Dunleavy. In July 2026, he said he would "consider resigning" if Yukon exceeded its $1.2 billion debt cap, which he wants the federal government to raise to $3 billion.

== Personal life ==
He is married and has two children.

== Electoral record ==
2025 Yukon general election: Copperbelt North
Party	Candidate	Votes	%	±%
Yukon Party	Currie Dixon	760	68.35	+15.23
New Democratic	Matthew Lien	352	31.65	+9.18
Total valid votes		1,112		
Total rejected ballots				
Turnout			51.94	
Eligible voters		2,141		
Yukon Party hold		Swing		+3.02
Source(s) "2025 General Election Official Results". Elections Yukon.

2021 Yukon general election: Copperbelt North
Party	Candidate	Votes	%	±%
Yukon Party	Currie Dixon	717	51.91	+9.79
Liberal	Ted Adel	346	25.05	-20.01
New Democratic	Saba Javed	318	23.02	+10.20
Total valid votes		1,381		
Total rejected ballots				
Turnout			65.14	-6.71
Eligible voters		2,120		
Yukon Party gain		Swing		-13.43
Source(s) "2021 General Election Official Results". Elections Yukon.

2020 Yukon Party leadership election

Results by ballot
Candidate	Round 1		Round 2	
Candidate	Points	%	Points	%
Currie Dixon	694	46.55%	752	50.44%
Brad Cathers	682	45.74%	637	42.72%
Linda Benoit	160	10.73%		

2011 Yukon general election: Copperbelt North
Party	Candidate	Votes	%	±%
Yukon Party	Currie Dixon	520	47.8%	–
Liberal	Arthur Mitchell	407	37.4%	–
NDP	Skeeter Miller-Wright	159	14.6%	–
Total		1088	100.0%	–
