= Jeanie McLean =

Canadian politician

The Honourable Jeanie McLean

Deputy Premier of Yukon
- In office January 14, 2023 – November 22, 2025
- Premier: Ranj Pillai; Mike Pemberton
- Preceded by: Tracy-Anne McPhee
- Succeeded by: Vacant

Member of the Yukon Legislative Assembly for Mountainview
- In office November 7, 2016 – October 3, 2025
- Preceded by: Darrell Pasloski
- Succeeded by: Linda Moen

Minister of Tourism and Culture
- In office December 3, 2016 – January 14, 2023
- Premier: Sandy Silver
- Preceded by: Elaine Taylor
- Succeeded by: John Streicker

Personal details
- Party: Yukon Liberal Party

Jeanie McLean, formerly known as Jeanie Dendys, is a Canadian politician, who served as the deputy premier of Yukon from 2023 to 2025. She was elected to the Legislative Assembly of Yukon in the 2016 election. She represented the electoral district of Mountainview as a member of the Yukon Liberal Party until 2025.

== Life ==
McLean was born and raised in the Yukon, and is of Tahltan First Nation and Norwegian ancestry. She changed her surname to McLean in 2020 after marrying Tahltan band chief Rick McLean.

== Career ==
Prior to entering territorial politics, McLean was the Director of Justice for the Kwanlin Dün First Nation. She has served in numerous advisory capacities, including the Yukon Policing Review and the review of the Yukon Corrections system. McLean also served for four years as the Yukon representative to the RCMP Commissioner's First Nation Policing Advisory Board.

McLean defeated Yukon Premier Darrell Pasloski in his riding of Mountainview on November 7, 2016. On December 3, 2016, she was sworn in as the Yukon Minister of Tourism and Culture, as well as the Minister responsible for the Women's Directorate and the Minister responsible for the Yukon Workers' Compensation Health and Safety Board. She is currently also a member of the Standing Committee on Appointments to Major Government Boards and Committees.

She did not run in the 2025 Yukon general election.

== Electoral record ==
2021 Yukon general election: Mountainview
Party	Candidate	Votes	%	±%
Liberal	Jeanie McLean	402	38.21	+3.65
New Democratic	Michelle Friesen	356	33.84	-0.18
Yukon Party	Ray Sydney	268	25.48	-5.94
Independent	Coach Jan Prieditis	26	2.47	
Total valid votes		1,052	99.91	
Total rejected ballots		1	0.09	
Turnout		1,053		
Eligible voters				
Liberal hold		Swing		+1.91
Source(s) "Unofficial Election Results 2021". Elections Yukon.

=== Yukon general election, 2016 ===
Mountainview
Party	Candidate	Votes	%	±%
Liberal	Jeanie Dendys	439	34.6%	+14.5%
NDP	Shaunagh Stikeman	432	34.0%	-1.0%
Yukon Party	Darrell Pasloski	399	31.4%	-13.3%
Total		1,270	100.0%	–
