= Larry Bagnell =

Canadian politician (born 1949)

The Honourable Larry Bagnell PC
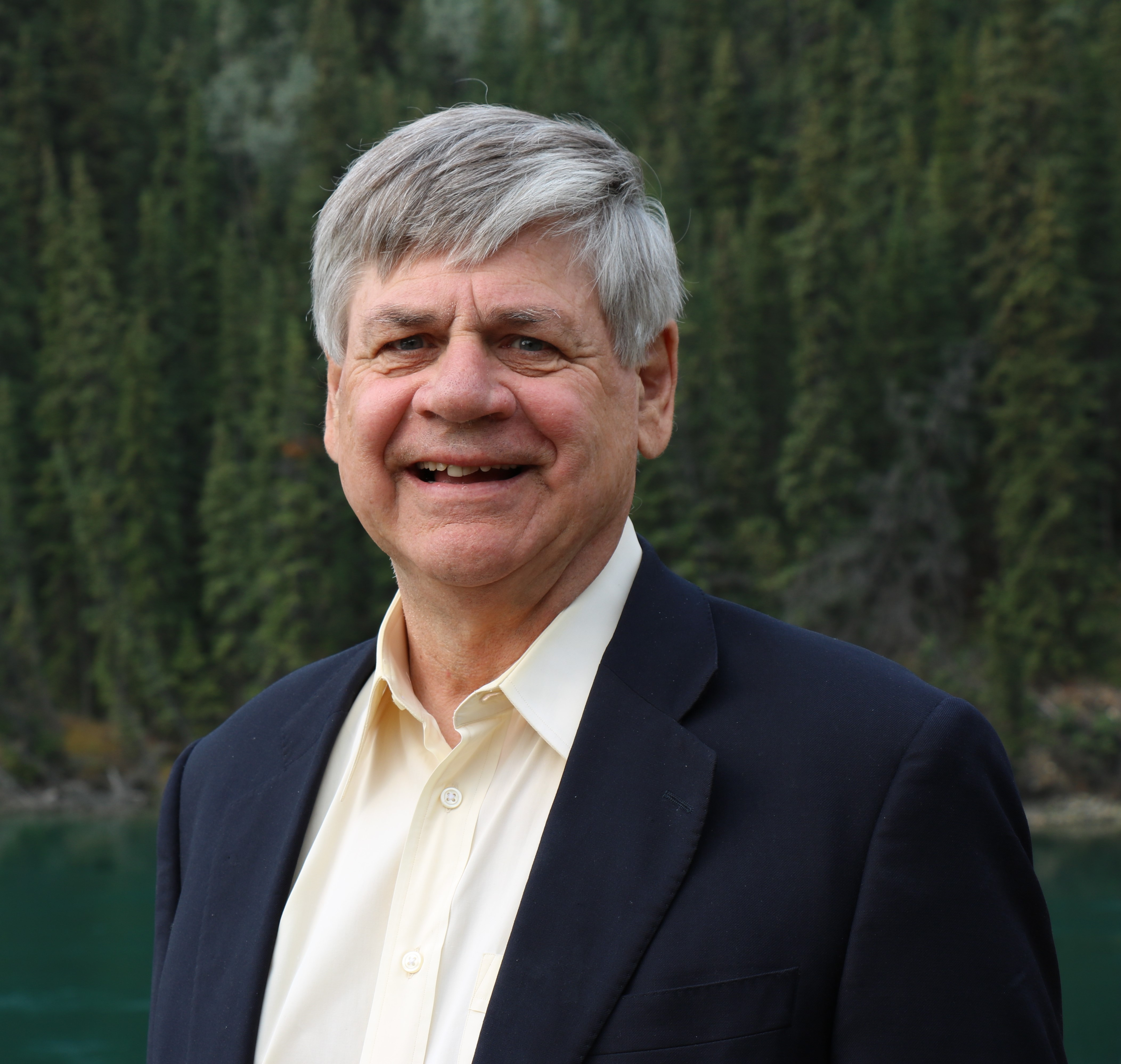

Member of Parliament for Yukon
- In office October 19, 2015 – September 20, 2021
- Preceded by: Ryan Leef
- Succeeded by: Brendan Hanley
- In office November 27, 2000 – May 2, 2011
- Preceded by: Louise Hardy
- Succeeded by: Ryan Leef

Parliamentary Secretary to the Minister of Economic Development and Official Languages(Canadian Northern Economic Development Agency)
- In office December 12, 2019 – September 20, 2021
- Minister: Mélanie Joly

Chairman of the Standing Committee on Procedure and House Affairs
- In office December 8, 2015 – September, 2019
- Preceded by: Joe Preston
- Succeeded by: Ruby Sahota

Parliamentary Secretary to the Minister of Natural Resources
- In office July 20, 2004 – February 5, 2006
- Minister: John Efford (July 20, 2004 -September 25, 2005), John McCallum (September 26, 2005 to February 3, 2006)
- Preceded by: Nancy Karetak-Lindell
- Succeeded by: Christian Paradis

Parliamentary Secretary to the Minister of Indian Affairs and Northern Development with special emphasis on Northern Economic Development
- In office December 12, 2003 – July 19, 2004
- Minister: Andy Mitchell
- Preceded by: Charles Hubbard
- Succeeded by: Sue Barnes

Personal details
- Born: December 19, 1949 (age 76) Toronto, Canada
- Party: Liberal
- Children: 2
- Profession: Executive director

Lawrence Bagnell PC (born December 19, 1949) is a Canadian former politician who served as the Member of Parliament (MP) for the riding of Yukon from 2000 to 2011 and again from 2015 to 2021. He served as a member of the Liberal Party of Canada.

== Early life ==
Bagnell was born in Toronto.

A graduate of the University of Toronto, Bagnell holds a Bachelor of Arts and Bachelor of Science.

In 1999, Bagnell was recognized by the City of Whitehorse with the Volunteer of the Year Award for his long record of community service, including terms as President of the Yukon chapter of the United Way, President of Yukon Learn Society, and President of the Skookum Jim Friendship Centre.

== Political career ==
Bagnell ran for a seat to the House of Commons of Canada in the 2000 Canadian federal election. He won the Yukon defeating incumbent Louise Hardy by 70 votes. He was re-elected in the 2004 federal election with close to half of the votes. Under the Paul Martin government, he served as the Parliamentary Secretary to both the Minister of Natural Resources and Minister of Indian Affairs and Northern Development.

He was again re-elected in the 2006 election, increasing both his number and percentage of votes. In February 2006, a local newspaper in Whitehorse, Yukon suggested that he be a candidate in the upcoming Liberal leadership race.

In February 2006, Bagnell was named the Critic for Northern Affairs in the Shadow Cabinet of Opposition leader Bill Graham, a role he continued to serve throughout his years in opposition.

On August 25, 2006, he announced that he was supporting Michael Ignatieff for the leadership of the Liberal Party of Canada.

Bagnell ran for a fourth term in the 2008 federal election. He won a tight four-way race defeating future Yukon Premier Darrell Pasloski and two other candidates.

Bagnell ran for his fifth term in the 2011 federal election but was defeated by Conservative candidate Ryan Leef, finishing second place out of four candidates in a closely contested election. Leef had campaigned on Bagnell voting in favour of the long gun registry, which was unpopular in the constituency.

Four years later, Bagnell sought a rematch with Leef, and defeated him decisively to regain his seat in the House of Commons. He was thereafter named as the chair of the Standing Committee on Procedure and House Affairs.

In March 2016, Bagnell was elected as the Vice-Chair of the Standing Committee of Parliamentarians of the Arctic Region (SCPAR), an international committee of delegates from eight Arctic states (Canada, Denmark, Finland, Iceland, Norway, Russia, Sweden, the United States) and the European Parliament.

At the 2016 Maclean's magazine Parliamentarians of the Year Awards, Bagnell was recognized by his peers with the award for Best Constituency MP.

In the 2019 election, Bagnell defeated conservative challenger Jonas Smith by a margin of only 153 votes, tied for the narrowest result of any electoral district in the country with Port Moody—Coquitlam (also 153 votes).

Following the 2019 election, Bagnell was appointed as the Parliamentary Secretary to the Minister of Economic Development and Official Languages (Canadian Northern Economic Development Agency). He also served as a member of Standing Committee on National Defence. Bagnell did not run in the 2021 federal election.

== Electoral history ==
=== Federal ===
2019 Canadian federal election: Yukon
Party	Candidate	Votes	%	±%	Expenditures
Liberal	Larry Bagnell	7,034	33.47	–20.18	$58,350.49
Conservative	Jonas Jacot Smith	6,881	32.74	+8.45	$46,071.34
New Democratic	Justin Lemphers	4,617	21.97	+2.54	$46,539.95
Green	Lenore Morris	2,201	10.47	+7.84	$48,980.40
People's	Joseph Zelezny	284	1.35	–	$3,036.51
Total valid votes/expense limit		21,017	99.37	–	$108,816.25
Total rejected ballots		133	0.63	+0.17	
Turnout		21,150	71.47	–4.37	
Eligible voters		29,591			
Liberal hold		Swing		–14.32	
Source: Elections Canada

2015 Canadian federal election: Yukon
Party	Candidate	Votes	%	±%	Expenditures
Liberal	Larry Bagnell	10,887	53.65	+20.70	$70,585.75
Conservative	Ryan Leef	4,928	24.29	–9.48	$162,394.24
New Democratic	Melissa Atkinson	3,943	19.43	+5.06	$79,988.15
Green	Frank de Jong	533	2.63	–16.28	$20,058.66
Total valid votes/expense limit		20,291	99.54	–	$210,779.30
Total rejected ballots		94	0.46	+0.04	
Turnout		20,385	75.84	+9.60	
Eligible voters		26,879			
Liberal gain from Conservative		Swing		+15.09	
Source: Elections Canada

2011 Canadian federal election: Yukon
Party	Candidate	Votes	%	±%	Expenditures
Conservative	Ryan Leef	5,422	33.77	+1.11	$80,016.06
Liberal	Larry Bagnell	5,290	32.95	–12.85	$75,849.45
Green	John Streicker	3,037	18.91	+6.08	$40,795.89
New Democratic	Kevin Barr	2,308	14.37	+5.67	$28,736.42
Total valid votes/expense limit		16,057	99.58	–	$85,898.10
Total rejected ballots		67	0.42	+0.01	
Turnout		16,124	66.24	+3.01	
Eligible voters		24,341			
Conservative gain from Liberal		Swing		+6.98	
Source: Elections Canada

2008 Canadian federal election: Yukon
Party	Candidate	Votes	%	±%	Expenditures
Liberal	Larry Bagnell	6,715	45.80	–2.72	$56,300.78
Conservative	Darrell Pasloski	4,788	32.66	+8.99	$68,207.41
Green	John Streicker	1,881	12.83	+8.87	$16,498.57
New Democratic	Ken Bolton	1,276	8.70	–15.15	$13,004.16
Total valid votes/expense limit		14,660	99.59	–	$82,726.77
Total rejected ballots		61	0.41	–0.24	
Turnout		14,721	63.23	–2.87	
Eligible voters		23,281			
Liberal hold		Swing		–5.86	
Source: Elections Canada

2006 Canadian federal election: Yukon
Party	Candidate	Votes	%	±%	Expenditures
Liberal	Larry Bagnell	6,847	48.52	+2.83	$43,305.56
New Democratic	Pam Boyde	3,366	23.85	–1.82	$35,380.91
Conservative	Sue Greetham	3,341	23.67	+2.77	$18,641.18
Green	Philippe LeBlond	559	3.96	–0.60	$20.30
Total valid votes/expense limit		14,113	99.35	–	$76,176.23
Total rejected ballots		93	0.65	+0.25	
Turnout		14,206	66.10	+4.28	
Eligible voters		21,493			
Liberal hold		Swing		+2.33	
Source: Elections Canada

2004 Canadian federal election
Party	Candidate	Votes	%	±%	Expenditures
Liberal	Larry Bagnell	5,724	45.68	+13.21	$43,323
New Democratic	Pam Boyde	3,216	25.67	-6.27	$42,221
Conservative	James Hartle	2,618	20.89	-14.27	$19,750
Green	Philippe LeBlond	571	4.55	–	$1,463
Marijuana	Sean Davey	299	2.38	–	
Christian Heritage	Geoffrey Capp	100	0.79	+0.39	
Total valid votes		12,528	100.0		
Total rejected ballots		50	0.40		
Turnout		12,578	61.82		
Liberal hold		Swing		+9.74	
Conservative change is from the combination of Canadian Alliance and Progressive Conservative votes.

2000 Canadian federal election
Party	Candidate	Votes	%	±%	Expenditures
Liberal	Larry Bagnell	4,293	32.47	+10.52	$48,252
New Democratic	Louise Hardy	4,223	31.94	+3.01	$65,576
Alliance	Jim Kenyon	3,659	27.67	+2.42	$31,121
Progressive Conservative	Don Cox	991	7.49	-6.45	$6,316
No Affiliation	Geoffrey Capp	53	0.40	-0.58	$1,044
Total valid votes		13,219	100.0		
Total rejected ballots		53	0.40		
Turnout		13,272	63.50		
Liberal gain from New Democratic		Swing		+3.76	
Geoffrey Capp was a Christian Heritage candidate, but the party lacked registered status. Canadian Alliance change is based on the former Reform Party.

=== Territorial ===
1996 Yukon general election: Whitehorse West
Party	Candidate	Votes	%	±%
NDP	Dave Sloan	486	40.7%	-1.6%
Liberal	Larry Bagnell	383	32.1%	+0.2%
Yukon Party	Ken McKinnon	323	27.0%	+2.3%
Total		1195	100.0%	–

}

1996 By-election: Whitehorse West
Party	Candidate	Votes	%	±%
NDP	Dave Sloan	433	42.3%	-3.3%
Liberal	Larry Bagnell	326	31.9%	+14.8%
Yukon Party	Shelda Hutton	253	24.7%	-10.1%
Total		1023	100.0%	–

- On the resignation of Tony Penikett, 1995
