= Copperbelt North =

Territorial electoral district in the Yukon, Canada

Yukon electoral district
- Interactive map of riding boundaries

Territorial electoral district
- Legislature: Yukon Legislative Assembly
MLA
Currie Dixon
Yukon Party
- District created: 2009
- First contested: 2011
- Last contested: 2025

Demographics
- Electors (2021): 2,120
- Census subdivision(s): Copper Ridge, Lobird

Copperbelt North is a territorial electoral district of Yukon that has been represented in the Yukon Legislative Assembly since 2011. It has been represented by Currie Dixon, the current Premier of Yukon since 2025 and the former Leader of the Opposition, from 2011 to 2016, and from 2021 to 2025.

The riding was created in 2009 following the amalgamation of part of the district of Whitehorse West and the former district of Copperbelt. In accordance to the Yukon Electoral District Boundaries Act (2024), it underwent moderate boundary changes, losing most of its southern portion to the riding of Copperbelt South.

== Geography ==
Copperbelt North comprises the southern portion of the Copper Ridge subdivision and the Lobird mobile home park in Whitehorse. It is bordered by the districts of Copperbelt South, Mountainview, Porter Creek South, and Whitehorse West, and covers residential areas located west of the Alaska Highway.

== History ==
Following its creation in 2009, the riding was first contested in the 2011 Yukon general election, and was won by Yukon Party candidate Currie Dixon. After Dixon chose to not seek re-election in 2016, the seat was won by Yukon Liberal Ted Adel. In the 2021 election, Dixon returned as the Yukon Party candidate and defeated Adel to regain the seat.

== Members of the Legislative Assembly ==
Assembly	Years	Member	Party
Copperbelt North; Riding created from Copperbelt and Whitehorse West
33rd	2011–2016	Currie Dixon	Yukon Party
34th	2016–2021	Ted Adel	Liberal
35th	2021–2025	Currie Dixon	Yukon Party
36th	2025–Present	Currie Dixon	Yukon Party

== Election results ==
=== 2025 ===
2025 Yukon general election
** Preliminary results — Not yet official **
Party	Candidate	Votes	%	±%
Yukon Party	Currie Dixon	772	68.50	+16.59
New Democratic	Matthew Lien	355	31.50	+8.48
Total valid votes		1,127		
Total rejected ballots				
Turnout				
Eligible voters				
Yukon Party hold		Swing		+4.06
Source(s) "Unofficial Election Results 2025". Elections Yukon.

2021 Yukon general election redistributed results
Party	Votes	%
Yukon Party	605	53
Liberal	278	24
New Democratic	256	22

=== 2021 ===
2021 Yukon general election
Party	Candidate	Votes	%	±%
Yukon Party	Currie Dixon	717	51.91	+9.8
Liberal	Ted Adel	346	25.05	-20.0
New Democratic	Saba Javed	318	23.02	+10.2
Total valid votes		1,381		
Total rejected ballots				
Turnout				
Eligible voters				
Yukon Party gain		Swing		-13.43
Source(s) "Unofficial Election Results 2021". Elections Yukon.

=== 2016 ===
2016 Yukon general election
Party	Candidate	Votes	%	±%
Liberal	Ted Adel	566	45.1%	+10.8%
Yukon Party	Pat McInroy	529	42.1%	-1.7%
NDP	André Bourcier	161	12.8%	-0.6%
Total		1256	100.0%	–

=== 2011 ===
Copperbelt North
Party	Candidate	Votes	%	±%
Yukon Party	Currie Dixon	520	47.8%	–
Liberal	Arthur Mitchell	407	37.4%	–
NDP	Skeeter Miller-Wright	159	14.6%	–
Total		1088	100.0%	–

== See also ==
- List of Yukon territorial electoral districts
- Canadian provincial electoral districts
