= John Streicker =

Canadian politician (born 1962)

The Honourable John Streicker
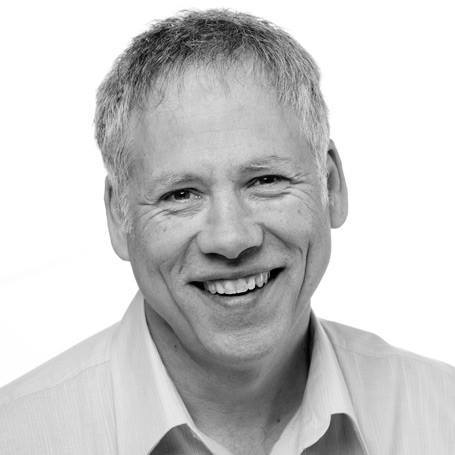

Minister of Community Services
- In office December 3, 2016 – January 14, 2023
- Premier: Sandy Silver
- Preceded by: Currie Dixon
- Succeeded by: Richard Mostyn

Member of the Yukon Legislative Assembly for Mount Lorne-Southern Lakes
- In office November 7, 2016 – October 3, 2025
- Preceded by: Kevin Barr
- Succeeded by: riding redistributed

Personal details
- Born: October 27, 1962 (age 63)
- Party: Green (federal); Yukon Liberal (territorial)
- Education: Yukon University; University of Saskatchewan

John Streicker (born October 27, 1962) is a Canadian artist and politician, who was elected to the Legislative Assembly of Yukon in the 2016 Yukon general election. He represented the electoral district of Mount Lorne-Southern Lakes as a member of the Yukon Liberal Party until 2025.

Streicker is a professional engineer, and lectures at Yukon University. He holds a Bachelor of Science degree from the University of Saskatchewan and a master's degree in engineering from the University of New Brunswick. He lives in Marsh Lake, Yukon.

== Political career ==
Prior to his election to the Yukon legislature, Streicker served on Whitehorse City Council from 2012 to 2015. He was formerly president of the Green Party of Canada, for whom he was a candidate in the federal electoral district of Yukon in the 2008 federal election and the 2011 election.

He was elected to the Yukon Legislative Assembly as the Liberal candidate for the rural riding of Mount Lorne-Southern Lakes on November 7, 2016, as part of a majority government of Sandy Silver. It was the first time the Liberals had won that riding. He defeated incumbent New Democrat Kevin Barr, who had also run in the 2011 federal election, by just 14 votes.

On December 3, 2016, Streicker was sworn into Yukon's Cabinet as Minister of Community Services, Minister responsible for the French Language Services Directorate, Minister responsible for the Yukon Liquor Corporation, and Minister responsible for the Yukon Lottery Corporation.

He did not run in the 2025 Yukon general election.

== Electoral record ==
2021 Yukon general election: Mount Lorne-Southern Lakes
Party	Candidate	Votes	%	±%
Liberal	John Streicker	446	38.98	+0.5%
Yukon Party	Eric Schroff	406	35.48	+11.3%
New Democratic	Erik Pinkerton	292	25.52	-11.8%
Total valid votes		1,144		
Total rejected ballots				
Turnout				
Eligible voters				
Liberal hold		Swing		-4.98
Source(s) "Unofficial Election Results 2021". Elections Yukon.

=== Yukon general election, 2016 ===
Mount Lorne-Southern Lakes
Party	Candidate	Votes	%	±%
Liberal	John Streicker	451	38.5%	+27.9%
NDP	Kevin Barr	437	37.3%	-9.5%
Yukon Party	Rob Schneider	284	24.2%	-13.7%
Total		1172	100.0%	–

=== Whitehorse municipal election, 2012 ===
Whitehorse municipal election, 2012
Candidate	Votes	%
John Streicker	2,951	10.8%
Betty Irwin	2,530	9.3%
Kirk Cameron	2,356	8.6%
Jocelyn Curteanu	2,129	7.8%
Dave Stockdale	1,640	6.0%
Mike Gladish	1,534	5.6%
Roslyn Woodcock	1,531	5.6%
Pat Berrel	1,435	5.3%
Dave Austin	1,401	5.1%
Sharon Shorty	1,369	5.0%
Julie Menard	1,333	4.9%
Al Fedoriak	1,271	4.7%
Cam Kos	914	3.3%
Mike Tribes	890	3.3%
Jean-Sebastien Blais	875	3.2%
Helen Geisler	656	2.4%
Patrick Singh	630	2.3%
Leona Kains	502	1.8%
Michael Kokiw	491	1.8%
Conrad Tiedeman	383	1.0%
Garth Brown	263	1.0%
Randy Collins	168	0.6%
Total	27,321	100%

=== Canadian federal election, 2011 ===
2011 Canadian federal election: Yukon
Party	Candidate	Votes	%	±%	Expenditures
Conservative	Ryan Leef	5,422	33.77	+1.11	$80,016.06
Liberal	Larry Bagnell	5,290	32.95	–12.85	$75,849.45
Green	John Streicker	3,037	18.91	+6.08	$40,795.89
New Democratic	Kevin Barr	2,308	14.37	+5.67	$28,736.42
Total valid votes/expense limit		16,057	99.58	–	$85,898.10
Total rejected ballots		67	0.42	+0.01	
Turnout		16,124	66.24	+3.01	
Eligible voters		24,341			
Conservative gain from Liberal		Swing		+6.98	
Source: Elections Canada

=== Canadian federal election, 2008 ===
2008 Canadian federal election: Yukon
Party	Candidate	Votes	%	±%	Expenditures
Liberal	Larry Bagnell	6,715	45.80	–2.72	$56,300.78
Conservative	Darrell Pasloski	4,788	32.66	+8.99	$68,207.41
Green	John Streicker	1,881	12.83	+8.87	$16,498.57
New Democratic	Ken Bolton	1,276	8.70	–15.15	$13,004.16
Total valid votes/expense limit		14,660	99.59	–	$82,726.77
Total rejected ballots		61	0.41	–0.24	
Turnout		14,721	63.23	–2.87	
Eligible voters		23,281			
Liberal hold		Swing		–5.86	
Source: Elections Canada
