= Marsh Lake-Mount Lorne-Golden Horn =

Territorial electoral district in the Yukon, Canada

Yukon electoral district
- Boundaries of Mount Lorne-Southern Lakes

Territorial electoral district
- Legislature: Yukon Legislative Assembly
MLA
Jen Gehmair
Yukon Party
- District created: 2009
- First contested: 2011
- Last contested: 2025

Demographics
- Electors (2021): 1,618
- Census subdivision(s): Carcross, Carcross 4, Macpherson-Grizzly Valley, Marsh Lake, Mt. Lorne, Tagish, Whitehorse, Unorganized, Yukon, Unorganized

Marsh Lake-Mount Lorne-Golden Horn (formerly Mount Lorne-Southern Lakes) is a territorial electoral district of Yukon that has been represented in the Yukon Legislative Assembly since 2011.

The riding was created in 2009 by merging most of the former districts of Mount Lorne and Southern Lakes. In accordance with the Yukon Electoral District Boundaries Act (2024), the district was split into Marsh Lake-Mount Lorne-Golden Horn and Southern Lakes for the 2025 Yukon general election.

== Geography ==
Marsh Lake-Mount Lorne-Golden Horn includes the communities of Marsh Lake, Little Squanga, Mount Lorne, Golden Horn, the Carcross Cutoff area, Annie Lake Road, Lewes Lake, and the Robinson subdivision. The riding is part of the traditional territory of the Carcross/Tagish First Nation, the Teslin Tlingit Council, and the Kwanlin Dün First Nation.

It is bordered by the ridings of Riverdale North, Riverdale South, Copperbelt South, Porter Creek South, Southern Lakes, Kluane, and Lake Laberge. It is the smallest electoral district outside of Whitehorse.

== Members of the Legislative Assembly ==
Assembly	Years	Member	Party
Mount Lorne-Southern Lakes; Riding created from Mount Lorne and Southern Lakes
33rd	2011–2016	Kevin Barr	New Democratic
34th	2016–2021	John Streicker	Liberal
35th	2021–2025	John Streicker	Liberal
Marsh Lake-Mount Lorne-Golden Horn
36th	2025–present	Jen Gehmair	Yukon Party

== Election results ==
=== 2025 ===
2025 Yukon general election
** Preliminary results — Not yet official **
Party	Candidate	Votes	%	±%
Yukon Party	Jen Gehmair	520	57.8	
New Democratic	Kevin Kennedy	348	38.7	
Liberal	James Rowberry	32	3.6	
Total valid votes		1,100		
Total rejected ballots				
Turnout				
Eligible voters				
Source(s) "Unofficial Election Results 2025". Elections Yukon.

2021 Yukon general election redistributed results
Party	Votes	%
Yukon Party	365	41
Liberal	320	35
New Democratic	216	24

=== 2021 ===
2021 Yukon general election: Mount Lorne-Southern Lakes
Party	Candidate	Votes	%	±%
Liberal	John Streicker	446	38.98	+0.5%
Yukon Party	Eric Schroff	406	35.48	+11.3%
New Democratic	Erik Pinkerton	292	25.52	-11.8%
Total valid votes		1,144		
Total rejected ballots				
Turnout				
Eligible voters				
Liberal hold		Swing		-4.98
Source(s) "Unofficial Election Results 2021". Elections Yukon.

=== 2016 ===
2016 Yukon general election
Party	Candidate	Votes	%	±%
Liberal	John Streicker	451	38.5%	+27.9%
NDP	Kevin Barr	437	37.3%	-9.5%
Yukon Party	Rob Schneider	284	24.2%	-13.7%
Total		1172	100.0%	–

=== 2011 ===
2011 Yukon general election: Mount Lorne-Southern Lakes
Party	Candidate	Votes	%
New Democratic	Kevin Barr	488	46.8%
Yukon Party	Deborah Fulmer	395	37.9%
Liberal	Ted Adel	111	10.6%
First Nations Party	Stanley James	49	4.7%
Total		1,043	100.0%
Source(s) "Report of the Chief Electoral Officer of Yukon on the 2011 General Election" (PDF). Elections Yukon. 2011.

== See also ==
- List of Yukon territorial electoral districts
- Canadian provincial electoral districts
