= Louise Hardy =

Canadian politician

Louise Frances Hardy

Member of Parliament for Yukon
- In office June 2, 1997 – November 27, 2000
- Preceded by: Audrey McLaughlin
- Succeeded by: Larry Bagnell

Personal details
- Born: November 30, 1959 (age 66) Whitehorse, Yukon, Canada
- Party: New Democrat
- Spouse: Todd Hardy
- Occupation: social worker

Louise Frances Hardy (née MacKinnon; born November 30, 1959) is a Canadian politician. Hardy was a New Democratic Party Member of Parliament for the riding of Yukon from 1997 to 2000. She was a critic for Human Rights, Housing, Citizenship and Immigration, Indian Affairs and Northern Development.

Born in Whitehorse, she was the Yukon's only federal MP so far to have been born in the territory.

She graduated from Yukon College with a diploma in Social Work. She is widowed from Todd Hardy, former leader of the Yukon New Democratic Party.

In 2026, Hardy endorsed Avi Lewis in that year's federal NDP leadership race.
