= Brendan Hanley =

Canadian politician, physician

Brendan Hanley MP

Parliamentary Secretary to the Minister of Northern and Arctic Affairs
- Incumbent
- Assumed office June 5, 2025

Member of Parliament for Yukon
- Incumbent
- Assumed office September 20, 2021
- Preceded by: Larry Bagnell

Personal details
- Born: 1958 or 1959 (age 66–67)
- Party: Liberal
- Spouse: Lise Farynowski
- Children: 2
- Occupation: Politician; physician

Brendan E. Hanley MP (born 1958 or 1959) is a Canadian politician and physician, who was elected to the House of Commons of Canada in the 2021 Canadian federal election. He represents the electoral district of Yukon as a member of the Liberal Party of Canada. Prior to his election, he served as the Yukon's Chief Medical Officer of Health from 2008. During the COVID-19 pandemic in Yukon, he frequently provided updates and announcements starting in late March 2020.

Hanley has a background in emergency medicine and family practice in the territory, with previous experience working in the Northwest Territories and Nunavut. He has also worked with Doctors without Borders, providing medical care overseas in Africa and Asia. He received his medical degree from the University of Alberta, a diploma in tropical medicine and hygiene from the University of Liverpool, and a Masters in Public Health degree from Johns Hopkins Bloomberg School of Public Health.

He is married to Lise Farynowski and has two children.

== Electoral history ==
2025 Canadian federal election: Yukon
Party	Candidate	Votes	%	±%	Expenditures
Liberal	Brendan Hanley	12,009	53.05	+19.70	$90,427.99
Conservative	Ryan Leef	8,719	38.52	+12.26	$66,626.41
New Democratic	Katherine McCallum	1,434	6.34	–16.10	$33,019.36
Green	Gabrielle Dupont	474	2.09	–2.27	$9,267.12
Total valid votes/expense limit		22,636	99.45	–	$130,871.09
Total rejected ballots		125	0.55	–0.18	
Turnout		22,761	72.51	+8.38	
Eligible voters		31,392			
Liberal hold		Swing		+15.98	
Source: Elections Canada

2021 Canadian federal election: Yukon
Party	Candidate	Votes	%	±%	Expenditures
Liberal	Brendan Hanley	6,471	33.35	–0.12	$94,780.33
Conservative	Barbara Dunlop	5,096	26.26	–6.48	$76,590.55
New Democratic	Lisa Vollans-Leduc	4,354	22.44	+0.47	$47,903.91
Independent	Jonas Jacot Smith	2,639	13.60	–	$50,603.11
Green	Lenore Morris	846	4.36	–6.11	$13,461.75
Total valid votes/expense limit		19,406	99.27	–	$112,909.79
Total rejected ballots		142	0.73	+0.10	
Turnout		19,548	64.13	–7.34	
Eligible voters		30,482			
Liberal hold		Swing		+3.30	
Source: Elections Canada
