= Kevin Barr =

Canadian politician

Member of the Yukon Legislative Assembly for Mount Lorne-Southern Lakes
- In office October 11, 2011 – November 7, 2016
- Preceded by: Constituency established
- Succeeded by: John Streicker

Personal details
- Party: NDP
- Occupation: Musician, Politician

Kevin Barr is a Canadian politician, who served in the Yukon Legislative Assembly from 2011 to 2016. He represented the electoral district of Mount Lorne-Southern Lakes as a member of the Yukon New Democratic Party caucus. First elected in the 2011 election, he was defeated in the 2016 election by John Streicker of the Yukon Liberal Party.

== Political career ==
Barr first entered politics when he ran unsuccessfully for the New Democrats in the rural Yukon seat of Southern Lakes against incumbent Yukon Party MLA Patrick Rouble in the 2006 Yukon election

He tried again - this time in 2011 - for the Yukon seat in the House of Commons under the New Democrat banner against Liberal incumbent Larry Bagnell in the 2011 federal election. Barr finished in fourth place, trailing Bagnell, Conservative Ryan Leef (who narrowly defeated Bagnell), and Green candidate John Streicker.

Barr sought office again later that year for the Yukon New Democratic Party in the 2011 Yukon territorial election, this time in the newly created rural riding of Mount Lorne-Southern Lakes where he lives. Barr won comfortably.

During the 33rd Legislative Assembly, Barr served as New Democrat Caucus Chair, as well as caucus critic for Community Services, Tourism and Culture, the Yukon Liquor Corporation, and the Child and Youth Advocate. In office, Barr was a vocal opponent to fracking in the Yukon. In December 2015, he also presented a petition to establish National Aboriginal Day as a new statutory holiday in the territory.

Barr announced his intent to seek re-election in Mount Lorne-Southern Lakes in the 2016 Yukon election, but was defeated narrowly in the campaign by now-Yukon Liberal John Streicker, who had placed ahead of Barr in the 2011 federal election. Streicker defeated Barr by just 14 votes; one of the closest that election. Barr was one of the four New Democrat incumbents to lose their seat in that campaign, in which the New Democrats was reduced to third party status.

== Personal life ==
Prior to his term in the legislature, Barr was a community worker in Whitehorse and Carcross, and a musician with the band Undertakin' Daddies (which was a nominee for the Juno Award for Roots & Traditional Album of the Year – Group).

== Electoral record ==
=== Yukon general election, 2016 ===
Mount Lorne-Southern Lakes
Party	Candidate	Votes	%	±%
Liberal	John Streicker	451	38.5%	+27.9%
NDP	Kevin Barr	437	37.3%	-9.5%
Yukon Party	Rob Schneider	284	24.2%	-13.7%
Total		1172	100.0%	–

=== Yukon general election, 2011 ===
2011 Yukon general election: Mount Lorne-Southern Lakes
Party	Candidate	Votes	%
New Democratic	Kevin Barr	488	46.8%
Yukon Party	Deborah Fulmer	395	37.9%
Liberal	Ted Adel	111	10.6%
First Nations Party	Stanley James	49	4.7%
Total		1,043	100.0%
Source(s) "Report of the Chief Electoral Officer of Yukon on the 2011 General Election" (PDF). Elections Yukon. 2011.

=== Canadian federal election, 2011 ===
2011 Canadian federal election
Party	Candidate	Votes	%	±%	Expenditures
Conservative	Ryan Leef	5,422	33.77%	+1.11%	$78,970
Liberal	Larry Bagnell	5,290	32.95%	-12.85%	$79,778
Green	John Streicker	3,037	18.91%	+6.08%	$42,746
New Democratic	Kevin Barr	2,308	14.37%	+5.67%	$28,631
Total valid votes/Expense limit		16,057	100.0%	$230,125	
Total rejected ballots		67	0.42%	–	
Turnout		16,124	68.11%	–	
Eligible voters		23,673	–	–	

=== Yukon general election, 2006 ===
2006 Yukon general election
Party	Candidate	Votes	%	±%
Yukon Party	Patrick Rouble	276	42.4%	+2.5%
NDP	Kevin Barr	238	36.6%	+3.2%
Liberal	Ethel Tizya	134	20.6%	+2.0%
Total		651	100.0%	–
