= Yukon (electoral district) =

Federal electoral district in Yukon, Canada

Yukon electoral district

Federal electoral district
- Legislature: House of Commons
MP
Brendan Hanley
Liberal
- District created: 1952
- First contested: 1953
- Last contested: 2025
- District webpage: profile, map

Demographics
- Population (2024): 47,124
- Electors (2015): 25,264
- Area (km²): 482,443
- Pop. density (per km²): 0.1
- Census division: Yukon
- Census subdivision(s): Whitehorse, Dawson, Watson Lake, Haines Junction, Carmacks, Faro, Teslin, Mayo, Carcross, Lake Laberge

Yukon is a federal electoral district covering the entire territory of Yukon, Canada. It has been represented in the House of Commons of Canada from 1902 to 1949 and since 1953.

The city of Whitehorse comprises an overwhelmingly large portion of the electorate.

== Demographics ==
Population, 2024	47,124
Electors	21,196
Area (km^{2})	482,443 km^{2}
Population density (people per km^{2})	0.06/km^{2}

According to the 2016 Canadian census

- Twenty most common mother tongue languages (2016) : 83.4% English, 4.5% French, 2.3% Tagalog, 2.2% German, 0.6% Cantonese, 0.6% Northern Tutchone, 0.5% Spanish, 0.5% Kaska, 0.3% Dutch, 0.3% Mandarin, 0.3% Japanese, 0.3% Panjabi, 0.2% Cebuano, 0.2% Gwi'chin, 0.2% Russian, 0.2% Southern Tutchone, 0.2% Polish, 0.2% Tlingit, 0.2% Czech

== Geography ==
The district includes all of Yukon.

== History ==
The electoral district was created in 1901 with the obligation that Yukon send a Member of Parliament to the House of Commons by January 1, 1903. James Hamilton Ross, the third Commissioner of Yukon, was elected on December 2, 1902.

The riding was abolished in 1947, and the riding of Yukon—Mackenzie River was created including a portion of the Northwest Territories. In 1952, Yukon-Mackenzie River was abolished, and the riding of Yukon was recreated.

== Riding associations ==
Riding associations are the local branches of political parties:

Party	Association name	CEO	HQ city
Conservative	Yukon Conservative Association	Colin Yellowknee	Whitehorse
Green	Yukon Green Party Association	Shirley A. Watts-Haase	Marsh Lake
Liberal	Yukon Liberal Association	Michael L. Pemberton	Whitehorse
New Democratic	Yukon Federal New Democratic Party Riding Association	Daniel R. Bader	Whitehorse

== Members of Parliament ==
This riding has elected the following members of Parliament:

Parliament	Years	Member	Party
Yukon
9th	1902–1904	James Hamilton Ross	Liberal
10th	1904–1908	Alfred Thompson	Conservative
11th	1908–1911	Frederick Tennyson Congdon	Liberal
12th	1911–1917	Alfred Thompson	Conservative
13th	1917–1921	Alfred Thompson	Government (Unionist)
14th	1921–1925	George Black	Conservative
15th	1925–1926	George Black	Conservative
16th	1926–1930	George Black	Conservative
17th	1930–1935	George Black	Conservative
18th	1935–1940	Martha Black	Independent Conservative
19th	1940–1945	George Black	National Government
20th	1945–1949	George Black	Progressive Conservative
Riding dissolved into Yukon—Mackenzie River
Riding re-created from Yukon—Mackenzie River
22nd	1953–1957	James Aubrey Simmons	Liberal
23rd	1957–1957	James Aubrey Simmons	Liberal
23rd	1957–1958	Erik Nielsen	Progressive Conservative
24th	1958–1962	Erik Nielsen	Progressive Conservative
25th	1962–1963	Erik Nielsen	Progressive Conservative
26th	1963–1965	Erik Nielsen	Progressive Conservative
27th	1965–1968	Erik Nielsen	Progressive Conservative
28th	1968–1972	Erik Nielsen	Progressive Conservative
29th	1972–1974	Erik Nielsen	Progressive Conservative
30th	1974–1979	Erik Nielsen	Progressive Conservative
31st	1979–1980	Erik Nielsen	Progressive Conservative
32nd	1980–1984	Erik Nielsen	Progressive Conservative
33rd	1984–1987	Erik Nielsen	Progressive Conservative
33rd	1987–1988	Audrey McLaughlin	New Democratic
34th	1988–1993	Audrey McLaughlin	New Democratic
35th	1993–1997	Audrey McLaughlin	New Democratic
36th	1997–2000	Louise Hardy	New Democratic
37th	2000–2004	Larry Bagnell	Liberal
38th	2004–2006	Larry Bagnell	Liberal
39th	2006–2008	Larry Bagnell	Liberal
40th	2008–2011	Larry Bagnell	Liberal
41st	2011–2015	Ryan Leef	Conservative
42nd	2015–2019	Larry Bagnell	Liberal
43rd	2019–2021	Larry Bagnell	Liberal
44th	2021–2025	Brendan Hanley	Liberal
45th	2025–present	Brendan Hanley	Liberal

=== Current member of Parliament ===
Yukon's current member of Parliament is Brendan Hanley, a member of the Liberal Party who was elected in 2021.

== Election results ==
=== Yukon (1953–present) ===
Graph of election results in Yukon (since 1953, minor parties that never got 2% of the vote or didn't run consistently are omitted) View source data.

2025 Canadian federal election
Party	Candidate	Votes	%	±%	Expenditures
Liberal	Brendan Hanley	12,009	53.05	+19.70	$90,427.99
Conservative	Ryan Leef	8,719	38.52	+12.26	$66,626.41
New Democratic	Katherine McCallum	1,434	6.34	–16.10	$33,019.36
Green	Gabrielle Dupont	474	2.09	–2.27	$9,267.12
Total valid votes/expense limit		22,636	99.45	–	$130,871.09
Total rejected ballots		125	0.55	–0.18	
Turnout		22,761	72.51	+8.38	
Eligible voters		31,392			
Liberal hold		Swing		+15.98	
Source: Elections Canada

2021 Canadian federal election
Party	Candidate	Votes	%	±%	Expenditures
Liberal	Brendan Hanley	6,471	33.35	–0.12	$94,780.33
Conservative	Barbara Dunlop	5,096	26.26	–6.48	$76,590.55
New Democratic	Lisa Vollans-Leduc	4,354	22.44	+0.47	$47,903.91
Independent	Jonas Jacot Smith	2,639	13.60	–	$50,603.11
Green	Lenore Morris	846	4.36	–6.11	$13,461.75
Total valid votes/expense limit		19,406	99.27	–	$112,909.79
Total rejected ballots		142	0.73	+0.10	
Turnout		19,548	64.13	–7.34	
Eligible voters		30,482			
Liberal hold		Swing		+3.30	
Source: Elections Canada

2019 Canadian federal election
Party	Candidate	Votes	%	±%	Expenditures
Liberal	Larry Bagnell	7,034	33.47	–20.18	$58,350.49
Conservative	Jonas Jacot Smith	6,881	32.74	+8.45	$46,071.34
New Democratic	Justin Lemphers	4,617	21.97	+2.54	$46,539.95
Green	Lenore Morris	2,201	10.47	+7.84	$48,980.40
People's	Joseph Zelezny	284	1.35	–	$3,036.51
Total valid votes/expense limit		21,017	99.37	–	$108,816.25
Total rejected ballots		133	0.63	+0.17	
Turnout		21,150	71.47	–4.37	
Eligible voters		29,591			
Liberal hold		Swing		–14.32	
Source: Elections Canada

2015 Canadian federal election
Party	Candidate	Votes	%	±%	Expenditures
Liberal	Larry Bagnell	10,887	53.65	+20.70	$70,585.75
Conservative	Ryan Leef	4,928	24.29	–9.48	$162,394.24
New Democratic	Melissa Atkinson	3,943	19.43	+5.06	$79,988.15
Green	Frank de Jong	533	2.63	–16.28	$20,058.66
Total valid votes/expense limit		20,291	99.54	–	$210,779.30
Total rejected ballots		94	0.46	+0.04	
Turnout		20,385	75.84	+9.60	
Eligible voters		26,879			
Liberal gain from Conservative		Swing		+15.09	
Source: Elections Canada

2011 Canadian federal election
Party	Candidate	Votes	%	±%	Expenditures
Conservative	Ryan Leef	5,422	33.77	+1.11	$80,016.06
Liberal	Larry Bagnell	5,290	32.95	–12.85	$75,849.45
Green	John Streicker	3,037	18.91	+6.08	$40,795.89
New Democratic	Kevin Barr	2,308	14.37	+5.67	$28,736.42
Total valid votes/expense limit		16,057	99.58	–	$85,898.10
Total rejected ballots		67	0.42	+0.01	
Turnout		16,124	66.24	+3.01	
Eligible voters		24,341			
Conservative gain from Liberal		Swing		+6.98	
Source: Elections Canada

2008 Canadian federal election
Party	Candidate	Votes	%	±%	Expenditures
Liberal	Larry Bagnell	6,715	45.80	–2.72	$56,300.78
Conservative	Darrell Pasloski	4,788	32.66	+8.99	$68,207.41
Green	John Streicker	1,881	12.83	+8.87	$16,498.57
New Democratic	Ken Bolton	1,276	8.70	–15.15	$13,004.16
Total valid votes/expense limit		14,660	99.59	–	$82,726.77
Total rejected ballots		61	0.41	–0.24	
Turnout		14,721	63.23	–2.87	
Eligible voters		23,281			
Liberal hold		Swing		–5.86	
Source: Elections Canada

2006 Canadian federal election
Party	Candidate	Votes	%	±%	Expenditures
Liberal	Larry Bagnell	6,847	48.52	+2.83	$43,305.56
New Democratic	Pam Boyde	3,366	23.85	–1.82	$35,380.91
Conservative	Sue Greetham	3,341	23.67	+2.77	$18,641.18
Green	Philippe LeBlond	559	3.96	–0.60	$20.30
Total valid votes/expense limit		14,113	99.35	–	$76,176.23
Total rejected ballots		93	0.65	+0.25	
Turnout		14,206	66.10	+4.28	
Eligible voters		21,493			
Liberal hold		Swing		+2.33	
Source: Elections Canada

2004 Canadian federal election
Party	Candidate	Votes	%	±%	Expenditures
Liberal	Larry Bagnell	5,724	45.69	+13.21	$42,440.20
New Democratic	Pam Boyde	3,216	25.67	–6.28	$40,563.61
Conservative	James Hartle	2,618	20.90	–14.28	$19,058.78
Green	Philippe LeBlond	571	4.56	–	$1,361.96
Marijuana	Sean Davey	299	2.39	–	none listed
Christian Heritage	Geoffrey Capp	100	0.80	–	none listed
Total valid votes/expense limit		12,528	99.60	–	$73,556.34
Total rejected ballots		50	0.40	+0.00	
Turnout		12,578	61.82	–1.68	
Eligible voters		20,345			
Liberal hold		Swing		+9.75	
Source: Elections Canada

2000 Canadian federal election
Party	Candidate	Votes	%	±%	Expenditures
Liberal	Larry Bagnell	4,293	32.48	+10.53	$48,252
New Democratic	Louise Hardy	4,223	31.95	+3.01	$65,576
Alliance	Jim Kenyon	3,659	27.68	+2.42	$31,121
Progressive Conservative	Don Cox	991	7.50	–6.44	$6,316
Independent	Geoffrey Capp	53	0.40	–8.52	$1,044
Total valid votes		13,219	99.60		
Total rejected ballots		53	0.40	–0.22	
Turnout		13,272	63.50	–6.31	
Eligible voters		20,901			
Liberal gain from New Democratic		Swing		+6.77	
Source: Elections Canada

1997 Canadian federal election
Party	Candidate	Votes	%	±%	Expenditures
New Democratic	Louise Hardy	4,002	28.94	–14.40	$52,148
Reform	Ken Gabb	3,493	25.26	+12.15	$18,143
Liberal	Shirley Adamson	3,036	21.95	–1.34	$43,661
Progressive Conservative	Ken McKinnon	1,928	13.94	–3.85	$24,269
Independent	Don Branigan	1,234	8.92	–	$8,160
Christian Heritage	Geoffrey Capp	136	0.98	+0.56	$1,267
Total valid votes		13,829	99.38		
Total rejected ballots		86	0.62	+0.30	
Turnout		13,915	69.81	–0.56	
Eligible voters		19,934			
New Democratic hold		Swing		–13.28	
Source: Elections Canada

1993 Canadian federal election
Party	Candidate	Votes	%	±%
New Democratic	Audrey McLaughlin	6,252	43.34	–8.08
Liberal	Don Branigan	3,359	23.29	+11.98
Progressive Conservative	Al Kapty	2,566	17.79	–17.49
Reform	A.B. Short Tompkins	1,891	13.11	–
National	Robert L. Olson	296	2.05	–
Christian Heritage	Geoffrey Capp	61	0.42	–1.57
Total valid votes		14,425	99.68	
Total rejected ballots		46	0.32	+0.12
Turnout		14,471	70.37	–8.00
Eligible voters		20,565		
New Democratic hold		Swing		–10.03
Source: Elections Canada

1988 Canadian federal election
Party	Candidate	Votes	%	±%
New Democratic	Audrey McLaughlin	6,594	51.42	+16.22
Progressive Conservative	Charlie Friday	4,524	35.28	+8.00
Liberal	Joe Jack	1,450	11.31	–21.11
Christian Heritage	Jacob De Raadt	255	1.99	–
Total valid votes		12,823	99.80	
Total rejected ballots		26	0.20	+0.20
Turnout		12,849	78.37	–
Eligible voters		16,396		
New Democratic hold		Swing		+12.11
Source: Elections Canada

Canadian federal by-election, July 20, 1987
Party	Candidate	Votes	%	±%
New Democratic	Audrey McLaughlin	3,273	35.20	+19.10
Liberal	Don Branigan	3,014	32.42	+10.76
Progressive Conservative	David Leverton	2,536	27.28	–29.52
Independent	Fred Marshall	474	5.10	–
Total valid votes		9,297	100.00	
Total rejected ballots		unknown		
Turnout		9,297	–	–
Eligible voters				
New Democratic gain from Progressive Conservative		Swing		+14.93
Source: Elections Canada

1984 Canadian federal election
Party	Candidate	Votes	%	±%
Progressive Conservative	Erik Nielsen	6,648	56.80	+16.20
Liberal	Ron Veale	2,535	21.66	–17.90
New Democratic	Sibyl A. Frei	1,884	16.10	–3.74
Libertarian	Keith Dye	511	4.37	–
Rhinoceros	Douglas R. Gibb	126	1.08	–
Total valid votes		11,704	99.77	
Total rejected ballots		27	0.23	–0.07
Turnout		11,731	77.92	+8.88
Eligible voters		15,056		
Progressive Conservative hold		Swing		+17.05
Source: Elections Canada

1980 Canadian federal election
Party	Candidate	Votes	%	±%
Progressive Conservative	Erik Nielsen	3,926	40.60	+0.01
Liberal	Ione Christensen	3,825	39.56	+3.20
New Democratic	Jim McCullough	1,918	19.84	–3.22
Total valid votes		9,669	99.70	
Total rejected ballots		29	0.30	–0.22
Turnout		9,698	69.04	–12.50
Eligible voters		14,046		
Progressive Conservative hold		Swing		+1.61
Source: Elections Canada

1979 Canadian federal election
Party	Candidate	Votes	%	±%
Progressive Conservative	Erik Nielsen	4,538	40.59	–6.47
Liberal	Allen R. Lueck	4,065	36.36	+2.88
New Democratic	Joe Jack	2,578	23.06	+3.60
Total valid votes		11,181	99.48	
Total rejected ballots		59	0.52	+0.05
Turnout		11,240	81.54	+13.69
Eligible voters		13,785		
Progressive Conservative hold		Swing		–4.68
Source: Elections Canada

1974 Canadian federal election
Party	Candidate	Votes	%	±%
Progressive Conservative	Erik Nielsen	3,913	47.06	–5.98
Liberal	Paul S. White	2,784	33.48	+1.24
New Democratic	Tony Penikett	1,618	19.46	+7.82
Total valid votes		8,315	99.53	
Total rejected ballots		39	0.47	–4.97
Turnout		8,354	67.85	–11.71
Eligible voters		12,312		
Progressive Conservative hold		Swing		–3.61
Source: Library of Parliament

1972 Canadian federal election
Party	Candidate	Votes	%	±%
Progressive Conservative	Erik Nielsen	4,332	53.04	+5.07
Liberal	Don Branigan	2,633	32.24	–14.78
New Democratic	William Harvey Kent	951	11.64	+6.63
Independent	Rainer Giannelia	252	3.09	–
Total valid votes		8,168	94.56	
Total rejected ballots		470	5.44	+4.22
Turnout		8,638	79.56	–7.26
Eligible voters		10,857		
Progressive Conservative hold		Swing		+9.93
Source: Library of Parliament

1968 Canadian federal election
Party	Candidate	Votes	%	±%
Progressive Conservative	Erik Nielsen	3,110	47.97	–7.22
Liberal	Chris Findlay	3,048	47.02	+2.21
New Democratic	Robert A. McLaren	325	5.01	–
Total valid votes		6,483	98.78	
Total rejected ballots		80	1.22	–0.13
Turnout		6,563	86.82	+0.33
Eligible voters		7,559		
Progressive Conservative hold		Swing		–4.72
Source: Library of Parliament

1965 Canadian federal election
Party	Candidate	Votes	%	±%
Progressive Conservative	Erik Nielsen	3,136	55.19	+5.57
Liberal	Ray McKamey	2,546	44.81	+3.78
Total valid votes		5,682	98.65	
Total rejected ballots		78	1.35	+0.24
Turnout		5,760	86.49	–1.49
Eligible voters		6,660		
Progressive Conservative hold		Swing		+4.68
Source: Library of Parliament

1963 Canadian federal election
Party	Candidate	Votes	%	±%
Progressive Conservative	Erik Nielsen	2,969	49.62	–5.33
Liberal	Victor Wylie	2,455	41.03	–4.02
Social Credit	Ray Wilson	560	9.36	–
Total valid votes		5,984	98.89	
Total rejected ballots		67	1.11	+0.04
Turnout		6,051	87.98	–0.43
Eligible voters		6,878		
Progressive Conservative hold		Swing		+4.68
Source: Library of Parliament

1962 Canadian federal election
Party	Candidate	Votes	%	±%
Progressive Conservative	Erik Nielsen	3,250	54.95	+0.47
Liberal	Victor Wylie	2,664	45.05	+1.79
Total valid votes		5,914	98.93	
Total rejected ballots		64	1.07	–0.03
Turnout		5,978	88.41	–1.67
Eligible voters		6,762		
Progressive Conservative hold		Swing		+1.13
Source: Library of Parliament

1958 Canadian federal election
Party	Candidate	Votes	%	±%
Progressive Conservative	Erik Nielsen	2,947	54.48	+3.09
Liberal	James Aubrey Simmons	2,340	43.26	–5.35
Independent Conservative	John Victor Watt	122	2.26	–
Total valid votes		5,409	98.90	
Total rejected ballots		60	1.10	–
Turnout		5,469	90.08	–
Eligible voters		6,071		
Progressive Conservative hold		Swing		+4.22
Source: Library of Parliament

Canadian federal by-election, December 16, 1957 election results were voided due to irregularities
Party	Candidate	Votes	%	±%
Progressive Conservative	Erik Nielsen	2,365	51.39	+2.06
Liberal	James Aubrey Simmons	2,237	48.61	–2.06
Total valid votes		4,602	100.00	
Total rejected ballots		unknown		
Turnout		4,602	–	–
Eligible voters				
Progressive Conservative gain from Liberal		Swing		+2.06
Source: Library of Parliament

1957 Canadian federal election
Party	Candidate	Votes	%	±%
Liberal	James Aubrey Simmons	2,422	50.67	–7.14
Progressive Conservative	Erik Nielsen	2,358	49.33	+33.66
Total valid votes		4,780	97.71	
Total rejected ballots		112	2.29	+0.88
Turnout		4,892	88.72	+12.79
Eligible voters		5,514		
Liberal hold		Swing		–20.40
Source: Library of Parliament

1953 Canadian federal election
Party	Candidate	Votes	%	±%
Liberal	James Aubrey Simmons	2,176	57.81	–
Social Credit	Richard Gordon Lee	998	26.51	–
Progressive Conservative	George Black	590	15.67	–
Total valid votes		3,764	98.59	
Total rejected ballots		54	1.41	–
Turnout		3,818	75.93	–
Eligible voters		5,028		
Liberal hold		Swing		N/A
Source: Library of Parliament

=== Yukon (1902–1947) ===
Graph of election results in Yukon (1902–1947, minor parties that never got 2% of the vote or didn't run consistently are omitted) View source data.

1945 Canadian federal election
Party	Candidate	Votes	%	±%
Progressive Conservative	George Black	849	40.05	–13.52
Labor–Progressive	Tom McEwen	687	32.41	–
Co-operative Commonwealth	Clive Hunter Cunningham	584	27.55	–
Total valid votes		2,120	97.97	
Total rejected ballots		44	2.03	+0.13
Turnout		2,164	62.82	–20.20
Eligible voters		3,445		
Progressive Conservative gain from National Government		Swing		–22.97
Source: Library of Parliament

1940 Canadian federal election
Party	Candidate	Votes	%	±%
National Government	George Black	915	53.57	–2.07
Liberal	Charles Reid	793	46.43	+2.07
Total valid votes		1,708	98.10	
Total rejected ballots		33	1.90	+0.79
Turnout		1,741	83.02	+12.94
Eligible voters		2,097		
National Government gain from Independent Conservative		Swing		+27.82
Source: Library of Parliament

1935 Canadian federal election
Party	Candidate	Votes	%	±%
Independent Conservative	Martha Black	696	55.64	–4.66
Liberal	John Patrick Smith	555	44.36	+4.66
Total valid votes		1,251	98.89	
Total rejected ballots		14	1.11	+1.11
Turnout		1,265	70.08	–11.54
Eligible voters		1,805		
Independent Conservative gain from Conservative		Swing		+30.15
Source: Library of Parliament

1930 Canadian federal election
Party	Candidate	Votes	%	±%
Conservative	George Black	846	60.30	+4.35
Liberal	William Edward Thompson	557	39.70	–4.35
Total valid votes		1,403	100.00	
Total rejected ballots		unknown		
Turnout		1,403	81.62	+2.02
Eligible voters		1,719		
Conservative hold		Swing		+4.35
Source: Library of Parliament

1926 Canadian federal election
Party	Candidate	Votes	%	±%
Conservative	George Black	823	55.95	–3.41
Liberal	Frederick Tennyson Congdon	648	44.05	+3.41
Total valid votes		1,471	100.00	
Total rejected ballots		unknown		
Turnout		1,471	79.60	+2.49
Eligible voters		1,848		
Conservative hold		Swing		–3.41
Source: Library of Parliament

1925 Canadian federal election
Party	Candidate	Votes	%	±%
Conservative	George Black	742	59.36	+8.24
Liberal	Robert Lowe	508	40.64	–6.94
Total valid votes		1,250	100.00	
Total rejected ballots		unknown		
Turnout		1,250	77.11	–6.30
Eligible voters		1,621		
Conservative hold		Swing		+7.59
Source: Library of Parliament

1921 Canadian federal election
Party	Candidate	Votes	%	±%
Conservative	George Black	707	51.12	–3.15
Liberal	Frederick Tennyson Congdon	658	47.58	+1.85
Independent	George Pitts	18	1.30	–
Total valid votes		1,383	100.00	
Total rejected ballots		unknown		
Turnout		1,383	83.41	–15.42
Eligible voters		1,658		
Conservative hold		Swing		+2.50
Source: Library of Parliament

1917 Canadian federal election
Party	Candidate	Votes	%	±%
Government (Unionist)	Alfred Thompson	959	54.27	–6.52
Opposition	Frederick Tennyson Congdon	808	45.73	+6.52
Total valid votes		1,767	100.00	
Total rejected ballots		unknown		
Turnout		1,767	98.83	+15.99
Eligible voters		1,788		
Government (Unionist) hold		Swing		+6.52
Source: Library of Parliament

1911 Canadian federal election
Party	Candidate	Votes	%	±%
Conservative	Alfred Thompson	1,285	60.79	+50.04
Liberal	Frederick Tennyson Congdon	829	39.21	–1.03
Total valid votes		2,114	100.00	
Total rejected ballots		unknown		
Turnout		2,114	82.84	–3.02
Eligible voters		2,552		
Conservative gain from Liberal		Swing		+25.54
Source: Library of Parliament

1908 Canadian federal election
Party	Candidate	Votes	%	±%
Liberal	Frederick Tennyson Congdon	992	40.24	–1.20
Unknown	George Black	726	29.45	–
Unknown	Robert Lowe	482	19.55	–
Conservative	Joseph Clarke	265	10.75	–47.81
Total valid votes		2,465	100.00	
Total rejected ballots		unknown		
Turnout		2,465	85.86	+21.66
Eligible voters		2,871		
Liberal gain from Conservative		Swing		–15.33
Source: Library of Parliament

1904 Canadian federal election
Party	Candidate	Votes	%	±%
Conservative	Alfred Thompson	2,113	58.56	+17.39
Liberal	Frederick Tennyson Congdon	1,495	41.44	–17.39
Total valid votes		3,608	100.00	
Total rejected ballots		unknown		
Turnout		3,608	64.20	–
Eligible voters		5,620		
Conservative gain from Liberal		Swing		+17.39
Source: Library of Parliament

Canadian federal by-election, December 2, 1902
Party	Candidate	Votes	%	±%
Liberal	James Hamilton Ross	2,971	58.83	–
Conservative	Joseph Clarke	2,079	41.17	–
Total valid votes		5,050	100.00	
Total rejected ballots		unknown		
Turnout		5,050	–	–
Eligible voters				
Liberal hold		Swing		N/A
Source: Library of Parliament

== See also ==
- List of Canadian electoral districts
- Historical federal electoral districts of Canada
