= Lake Laberge =

Lake in Yukon, Canada

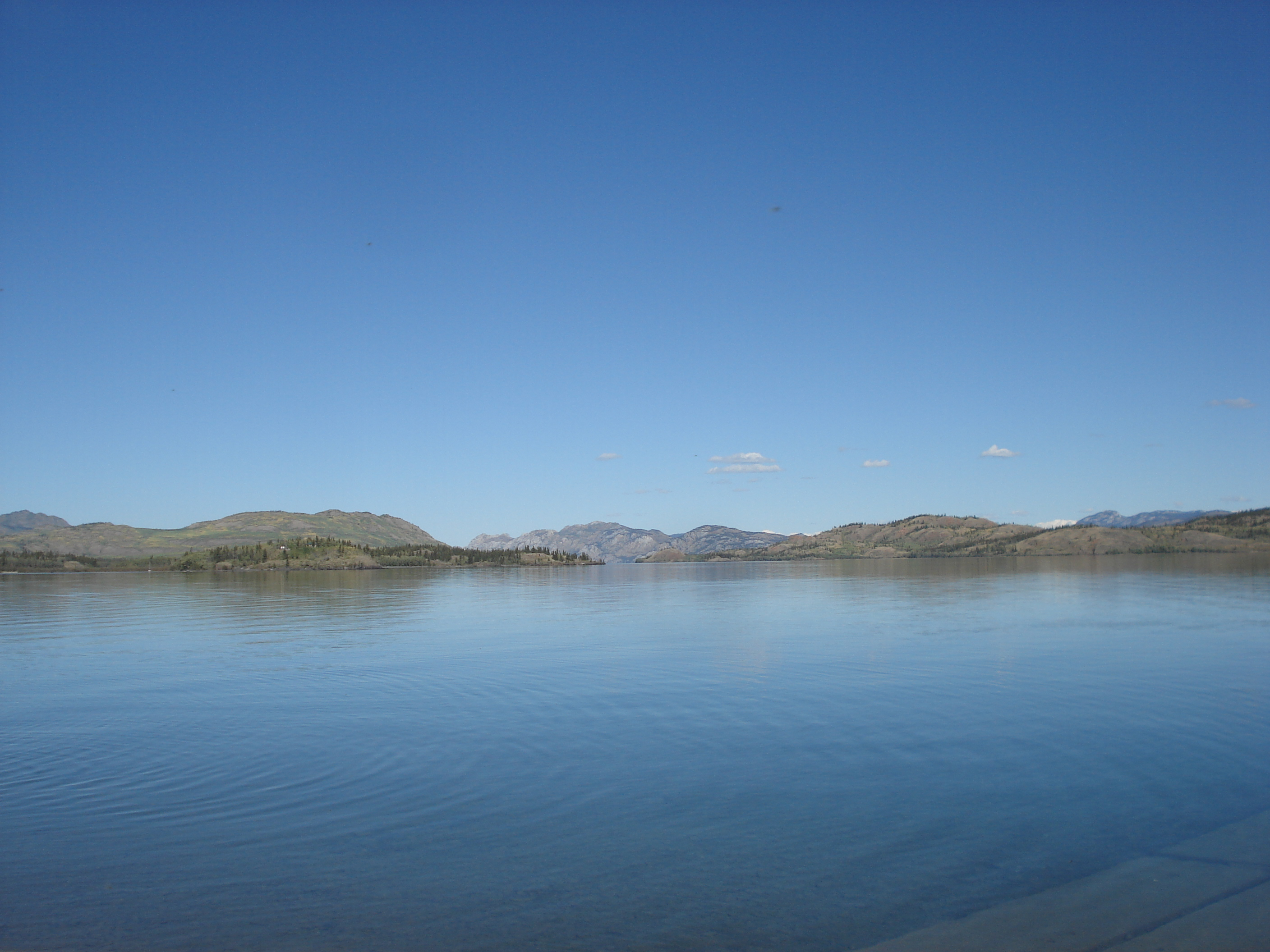
- Lake Laberge in August 2010; picture taken from campground

- Location within Yukon
- Location: Yukon
- Coordinates: 61°10′N 135°10′W
- Primary inflows: Yukon River
- Primary outflows: Yukon River
- Catchment area: 68,744,433 m^{2} (739,958,920 sq ft)
- Basin countries: Canada
- Max. width: 5 km (3.1 mi)
- Surface area: 201 km^{2} (78 sq mi)
- Average depth: 54 m (177 ft)
- Max. depth: 146 m (479 ft)

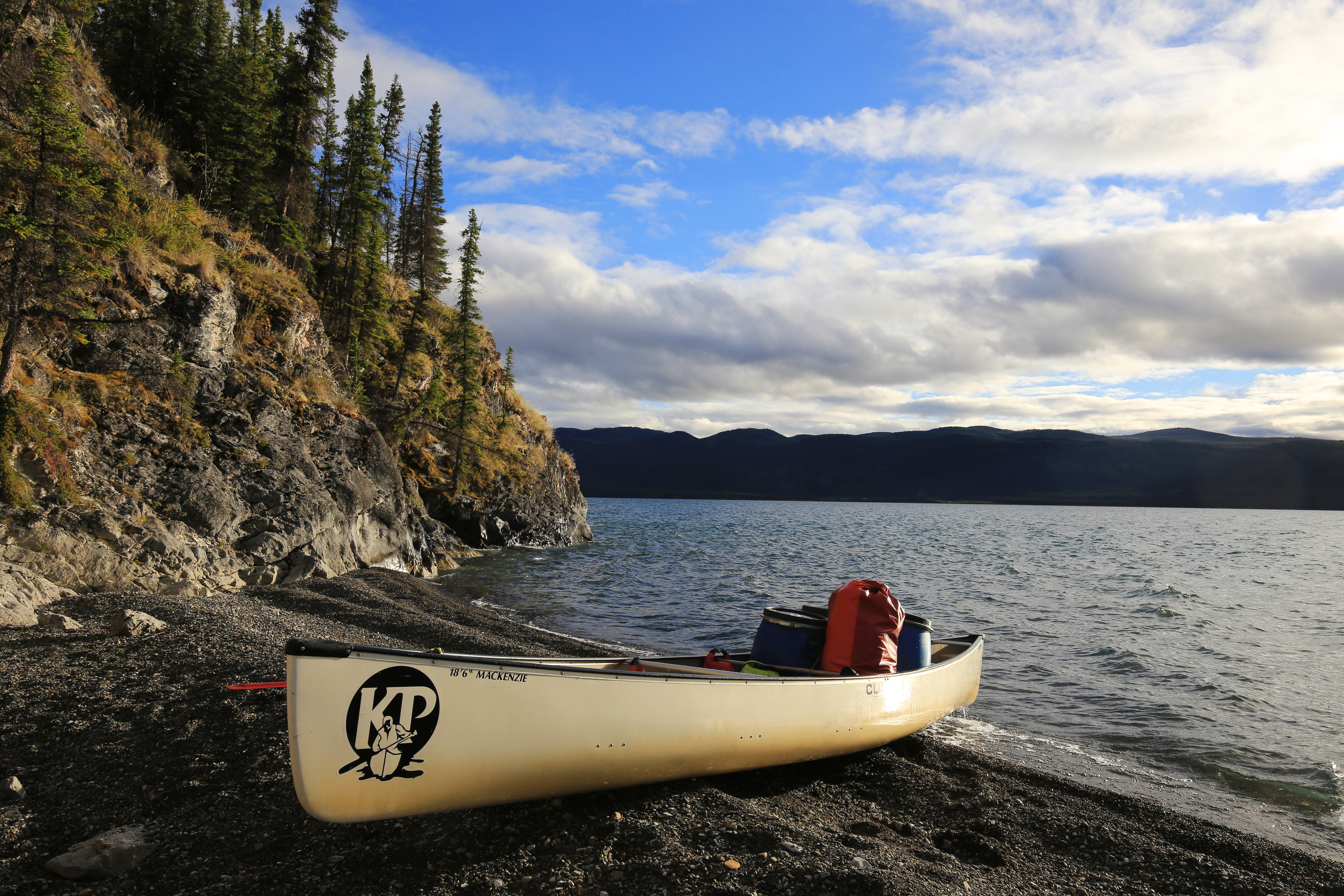
Crossing Lake Laberge by canoe

Lake Laberge is a widening of the Yukon River north of Whitehorse, Yukon in Canada. It is fifty kilometres (31 mi) long and ranges from two to five kilometres (1 to 3 mi) wide, with an average depth of 54 metres (177 ft), a maximum depth of 146 metres (479 ft) and a surface area of 201 km^{2} (78 sq mi). Its water is always very cold, and its weather often harsh and suddenly variable.

== Names ==
The local Southern Tutchone called it Tàa'an Män, Tagish knew it as Kluk-tas-si, and the Tlingit as Tahini-wud.

Its English name comes from 1870 commemorating Michel LaBerge (1836–1909) - born in Chateauguay, Quebec, the first French-Canadian to explore the Yukon in 1866. It was well known to prospectors during the Klondike Gold Rush of the 1890s, as they would pass Lake Laberge on their way down the Yukon River to Dawson City: Jack London's Grit of Women (1900) and The Call of the Wild (1903), and Robert W. Service's poem "The Cremation of Sam McGee" (1907) mention the lake (although Service altered the spelling from Laberge to "Lebarge" to rhyme with "marge"; but London used "Lebarge" too).

== History and archaeology ==
During the late 19th and early 20th centuries, after-winter steamers carrying goods on Lake Laberge early on in the shipping season regarded the lake as trouble, since it was one of the last such passages to thaw its ice. At least two methods were employed to break the ice up:

Method 1
Release a surge of water from the upstream control dam, below Marsh Lake, to suddenly raise the lake water beneath the ice, cracking the ice as its surface rises.

Method 2
Smear an abundant quantity of expended crankcase oil along the lake's icy length, causing it to melt by increasing the sun's warming effect.

In spring 2009, researchers found the A. J. Goddard, a Gold Rush sternwheeler that sunk in 1901, killing three of its crew. Underwater archaeologists are examining the ship. National Geographic has named it the top archeological find of 2009. The Yukon government has designated the shipwreck a historic site. A phonograph with three records was discovered, giving insight into songs being listened to during the Gold Rush.

== Toxaphene contamination ==
A sign posted in 1999 at Lake Laberge's camping area issued strong cautions against eating the livers of burbot, and counseled against the consumption of lake trout more than twice a month per individual. Both warnings are due to toxaphene contamination, resulting from global pesticide use and overfishing in Lake Laberge which resulted in changes to its typical food chain.

== Use in media ==
Lake Laberge is mentioned by name in Robert W. Service's "The Cremation of Sam McGee" as the location of the Alice May where Sam McGee is cremated. In the poem, the lake is called "Lake Lebarge."
