= Ryan Leef =

Canadian politician

Member of Parliament for Yukon
- In office May 2, 2011 – August 4, 2015
- Preceded by: Larry Bagnell
- Succeeded by: Larry Bagnell

Personal details
- Born: December 28, 1973 (age 52) Ontario, Canada
- Party: Conservative

Ryan Leef (born December 28, 1973) is a Canadian politician, who represented the riding of Yukon in the House of Commons of Canada as a member of the Conservative Party from 2011 to 2015.

== Early life ==
Born in Ontario in 1973, Leef grew up in Dawson City, Yukon. He has overseen prisoners as an assistant superintendent at Whitehorse Correctional Centre which was his most recent employment prior to politics. He is also a former member of the Royal Canadian Mounted Police, a Wildlife Officer and an investigator for Yukon Department of Justice. He has also fought in the cage as a Mixed Martial Arts fighter. He is a strong supporter and advocate of the sport.

Leef's family moved to the Yukon in 1984 and he has subsequently lived in many communities throughout the territory. Leef lives in Whitehorse and has one son, Aaron.

== Political career ==
Leef was first elected in May 2011 federal election. He was appointed to the Standing Committee on Fisheries and Ocean and the Standing Committee on Natural resources. He joined the Canada-Germany, Canada-United States, and Canada-Philippines interparliamentary groups and chaired the Canada-Australia-New Zealand Parliamentary Friendship Group. Leef also chaired the Northern Caucus and the MMA Caucus, co-chairs the Hunting and Angling Caucus and sits on BC/Yukon, Outdoor and National Caucuses.

Leef was noted in national media when he claimed that the polar bear population had increased dramatically. His position was refuted by polar bear researchers and according to one scientist was based on a report prepared by "professional climate change deniers."

Leef was defeated in 2015 by former MP Larry Bagnell, after serving just one term as a member of parliament, with Leef garnering 24% of ballots and Bagnell garnering 53.6% of the vote, despite Leef spending more than twice as much as Bagnell on the campaign.

== Philanthropy ==
Throughout his political career Leef endeavoured on many philanthropic projects under the banner of Inspiration Unlimited, including his "Border to Border Trek" across Yukon. The trek will see Leef running across the three Yukon borders over the course of three summers. Leef has already successfully completed his 1,200-kilometre journey from the northernmost point of the territory to British Columbia.

In October 2012, Leef ran in the Goodlife Fitness Victoria Marathon to raise money for the Canadian Diabetes Association.

Using his background as a Department of Justice defense tactics instructor Leef has led "Leaders in Life Mixed Martial Arts Against Bullying" clinics. He also hosted a chilli cook off in 2012 to benefit the Whitehorse Food Bank as well as a women's self-defence workshop to benefit the Yukon White Ribbon Campaign.

== Controversy ==
Leef has had a few brushes with the law, and one conviction. In 2007, he was found to have declared that a thinhorn sheep, which was shot by a Colorado trophy hunter he was guiding at the time, was shot in an area where it had not, in fact, been shot. The trial judge did not convict Leef, as he stated it was likely a careless mistake, however, the Yukon Supreme Court found that the trial judge had erred. It overturned the acquittal and found Leef guilty of making a false statement on the export form. In the same incident, Leef was charged by Conservation Officers with transporting the same sheep on an ATV in an area where ATVs were not allowed, but the judge found that the Crown had not proven beyond a reasonable doubt that Leef had in fact used an ATV at the time. These charges occurred during the time that Leef was also employed as a Conservation Officer for the Yukon Territory.

In addition, during Leef's 2015 campaign to be re-elected, he performed a citizen's arrest on a civilian who he caught defacing some campaign signs of his, at night, during a rainstorm.

== Electoral history ==
2025 Canadian federal election: Yukon
Party	Candidate	Votes	%	±%	Expenditures
Liberal	Brendan Hanley	12,009	53.05	+19.70	$90,427.99
Conservative	Ryan Leef	8,719	38.52	+12.26	$66,626.41
New Democratic	Katherine McCallum	1,434	6.34	–16.10	$33,019.36
Green	Gabrielle Dupont	474	2.09	–2.27	$9,267.12
Total valid votes/expense limit		22,636	99.45	–	$130,871.09
Total rejected ballots		125	0.55	–0.18	
Turnout		22,761	72.51	+8.38	
Eligible voters		31,392			
Liberal hold		Swing		+15.98	
Source: Elections Canada

2015 Canadian federal election: Yukon
Party	Candidate	Votes	%	±%	Expenditures
Liberal	Larry Bagnell	10,887	53.65	+20.70	$70,585.75
Conservative	Ryan Leef	4,928	24.29	–9.48	$162,394.24
New Democratic	Melissa Atkinson	3,943	19.43	+5.06	$79,988.15
Green	Frank de Jong	533	2.63	–16.28	$20,058.66
Total valid votes/expense limit		20,291	99.54	–	$210,779.30
Total rejected ballots		94	0.46	+0.04	
Turnout		20,385	75.84	+9.60	
Eligible voters		26,879			
Liberal gain from Conservative		Swing		+15.09	
Source: Elections Canada

2011 Canadian federal election: Yukon
Party	Candidate	Votes	%	±%	Expenditures
Conservative	Ryan Leef	5,422	33.77	+1.11	$80,016.06
Liberal	Larry Bagnell	5,290	32.95	–12.85	$75,849.45
Green	John Streicker	3,037	18.91	+6.08	$40,795.89
New Democratic	Kevin Barr	2,308	14.37	+5.67	$28,736.42
Total valid votes/expense limit		16,057	99.58	–	$85,898.10
Total rejected ballots		67	0.42	+0.01	
Turnout		16,124	66.24	+3.01	
Eligible voters		24,341			
Conservative gain from Liberal		Swing		+6.98	
Source: Elections Canada
