= Marsh Lake =

Widening of the Yukon River in south Yukon Territory, Canada

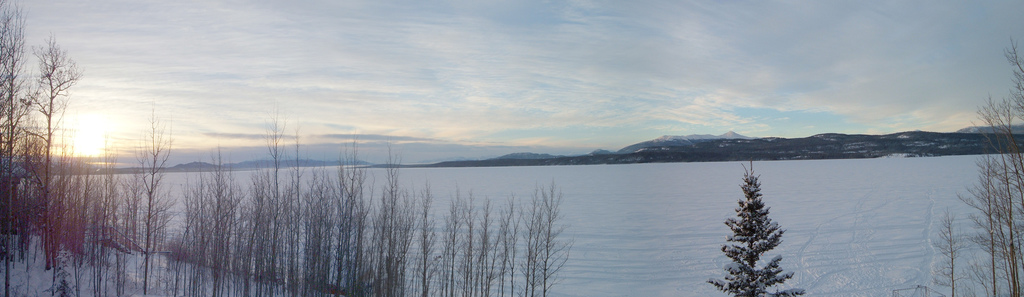
- Marsh Lake, Yukon

- Location within Yukon
- Location: Yukon
- Coordinates: 60°26′10″N 134°15′02″W
- Primary inflows: Yukon River
- Primary outflows: Yukon River
- Basin countries: Canada
- Max. length: 30 km (19 mi)
- Max. width: 4 km (2.5 mi)
- Surface area: 96.3 km^{2} (37.2 sq mi)
- Average depth: 12.8 m (42 ft)
- Surface elevation: 2,147 ft (654 m)
- Settlements: Marsh Lake

Marsh Lake (Mud Lake) is a widening of the Yukon River southeast of Whitehorse, Yukon, Canada. It is over 30 kilometres (19 mi) long and ranges from three to four kilometres (2 to 2.5 mi) wide. It has an area of 96.3 km^{2} (37.2 sq mi) and a mean depth of 12.8 m (42 ft). The co-ordinates of the lake are 60°26′10″N 134°15′02″W, and is 654 metres (2,147 ft) above sea level. The lake forms part of a chain of finger lakes, sometimes referred to as "The Southern Lakes", that form the headwaters of the Yukon River.

The community of Marsh Lake, Yukon is located along the northern shores of the lake.

== History ==
During the Klondike Gold Rush the Yukon River system was heavily relied upon for transportation. The passes and railhead to the southeast left the prospectors at Lake Bennett, the early ones had to build their own boats and float down the windy and dangerous Lake Bennett, Tagish Lake and "Mud Lake" before beginning on the Yukon River. A network of steamboats were soon developed and they began ferrying passengers to the rapids at Canyon City just outside what is now Whitehorse. These steamboats needed firewood, and one site was located on the southeast end of Marsh Lake, The Crystal Palace allowed passengers some time off the boat and the crew time to replenish their fuel wood supplies.

The name was changed from Mud Lake to Marsh Lake by Frederick Schwatka, after the Yale University Professor Othniel Charles Marsh, who contributed financially to Schwatka's mapping and exploration of Yukon.

During World War II, the Alaska Highway Project was routed along Marsh Lake, the military engineers were headquartered in Whitehorse. During a nice summer day the daughters of one of the officers decided to explore the swampy area off the northwest end of Marsh Lake, during their hike they discovered a large shallow sandy and warm bay, with a huge crescent of clean sand beach. It became cottage lots first for the military, then some local residents, and is still called Army Beach, Yukon.

Judas Creek was unsuccessfully prospected during the gold rush. Pyrite was discovered and a lot of work was conducted to discover the source of this sparkly mineral. When the eager and inexperienced miner located the source of the fool's gold, his disappointment was biblical and he named the creek Judas Creek.

During the late 1900s more people sought recreational land outside of Whitehorse, the government developed several subdivisions along Marsh Lake for cabin lots. As utilities were introduced the area became more of a bedroom community for Whitehorse.
