= Mountainview (electoral district) =

Territorial electoral district in the Yukon, Canada

Yukon electoral district
- Boundaries of Mountainview in Whitehorse

Territorial electoral district
- Legislature: Yukon Legislative Assembly
MLA
Linda Moen
New Democratic
- District created: 2009
- First contested: 2011
- Last contested: 2025

Demographics
- Electors (2021): 1,623
- Census subdivision: Whitehorse

Mountainview is an electoral district which returns a member (known as an MLA) to the Legislative Assembly of Yukon in Canada. It was created in 2009 out of parts of the former districts of McIntyre-Takhini and Copperbelt. It contains the Whitehorse subdivisions of Granger, Valleyview, McIntyre, and Hillcrest.

It is the former riding of the Yukon's 8th Premier, Darrell Pasloski. In the 2021 election, it is the only electoral district with an independent candidate and, thus, the only district with more than three candidates.

== Members of the Legislative Assembly ==
Assembly	Years	Member	Party
Riding created from McIntyre-Takhini and Copperbelt
33rd	2011–2016	Darrell Pasloski	Yukon Party
34th	2016–2021	Jeanie McLean	Liberal
35th	2021–2025	Jeanie McLean	Liberal
36th	2025–present	Linda Moen	New Democratic

== Election results ==
=== 2025 ===
2025 Yukon general election
** Preliminary results — Not yet official **
Party	Candidate	Votes	%	±%
New Democratic	Linda Moen	517	52.4	
Yukon Party	Peter Grundmanis	362	36.7	
Liberal	Jon Weller	102	10.9	
Total valid votes		981		
Total rejected ballots				
Turnout				
Eligible voters				
Source(s) "Unofficial Election Results 2025". Elections Yukon.

=== 2021 ===
2021 Yukon general election
Party	Candidate	Votes	%	±%
Liberal	Jeanie McLean	402	38.21	+3.65
New Democratic	Michelle Friesen	356	33.84	-0.18
Yukon Party	Ray Sydney	268	25.48	-5.94
Independent	Coach Jan Prieditis	26	2.47	
Total valid votes		1,052	99.91	
Total rejected ballots		1	0.09	
Turnout		1,053		
Eligible voters				
Liberal hold		Swing		+1.91
Source(s) "Unofficial Election Results 2021". Elections Yukon.

=== 2016 ===
2016 Yukon general election
Party	Candidate	Votes	%	±%
Liberal	Jeanie McLean	439	34.6%	+14.5%
NDP	Shaunagh Stikeman	432	34.0%	-1.0%
Yukon Party	Darrell Pasloski	399	31.4%	-13.3%
Total		1,270	100.0%	–

=== 2011 ===
2011 Yukon general election
Party	Candidate	Votes	%	±%
Yukon Party	Darrell Pasloski	480	44.7%	–
NDP	Stephen Dunbar-Edge	376	35.0%	–
Liberal	Dave Sloan	216	20.1%	–
Total		1,072	100.0%	–

== See also ==
- List of Yukon territorial electoral districts
- Canadian provincial electoral districts
