= Darrell Pasloski =

Canadian politician

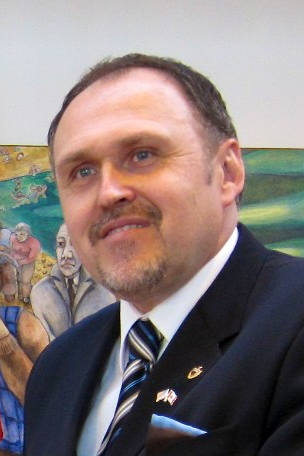

8th Premier of Yukon Minister of Finance
- In office June 11, 2011 – December 3, 2016
- Commissioner: Doug Phillips
- Preceded by: Dennis Fentie
- Succeeded by: Sandy Silver

MLA for Mountainview
- In office October 11, 2011 – November 7, 2016
- Preceded by: Constituency established
- Succeeded by: Jeanie Dendys

Leader of the Yukon Party
- In office May 28, 2011 – November 7, 2016
- Preceded by: Dennis Fentie
- Succeeded by: Stacey Hassard (interim)

Personal details
- Born: Darrell Thomas Pasloski; December 2, 1960 (age 65) St. Boniface, Manitoba
- Party: Yukon Party
- Other political affiliations: Conservative Party of Canada
- Spouse: Tammie
- Education: University of Saskatchewan College of Pharmacy
- Occupation: Pharmacist, business owner

Darrell Thomas Pasloski (born December 2, 1960) is a former territorial politician in Yukon, Canada, who was leader of the Yukon Party, and served as the eighth premier of Yukon from 2011 to 2016. His party was defeated in the general election of November 2016, and he lost his own seat. He was succeeded by Sandy Silver as Premier of Yukon on December 3, 2016.

== Early life ==
The oldest of three children, Darrell Pasloski was born in St. Boniface, Manitoba, with his family moving to Saskatchewan when he was a year old. Between grades 6 – 9, Pasloski and his family resided in High Level, Alberta, which was booming at the time with 1,000-1,500 people in the community.

Pasloski attended the College of Pharmacy at the University of Saskatchewan in Saskatoon, though he initially considered medical school. In 1982, Pasloski graduated with distinction from the College of Pharmacy.

Following graduation, he moved to Red Deer, Alberta for his first job.

Pasloski took a new position with Shoppers Drug Mart in Red Deer in 1986. The following year, he took over as the store owner. In June 1987, Pasloski opened the first Shoppers Drug Mart in Yorkton, Sask.

In 1991, he moved to Whitehorse and took over the Shoppers Drug Mart at Qwanlin Mall and later purchased the second Shoppers Drug Mart on Main Street.

By 2009, Pasloski relinquished ownership of both Shoppers Drug Mart locations and people began encouraging him to run territorially and for leadership of the Yukon Party.

== Political career ==
Pasloski ran for a seat to the Canadian House of Commons in the 2008 Canadian federal election under the Conservative banner. He finished second place to incumbent Larry Bagnell in a four way race in the Yukon electoral district.

Pasloski ran for leadership of the territorial Yukon Party and won at a convention held on May 28, 2011, winning over MLA Jim Kenyon and businessman Rod Taylor. He was formally sworn in as leader and premier on June 11. He was not a sitting member of the Yukon Legislative Assembly at the time of his investiture as premier; however, he won a seat in the 2011 election, representing the new electoral district of Mountainview.

Pasloski's government was defeated in the 2016 election in which he came in third in his constituency. He announced his resignation as Yukon Party leader on election night.

== Election record ==
=== Yukon general election, 2016 ===
Mountainview
Party	Candidate	Votes	%	±%
Liberal	Jeanie Dendys	439	34.6%	+14.5%
NDP	Shaunagh Stikeman	432	34.0%	-1.0%
Yukon Party	Darrell Pasloski	399	31.4%	-13.3%
Total		1,270	100.0%	–

=== Yukon general election, 2011 ===
Mountainview
Party	Candidate	Votes	%	±%
Yukon Party	Darrell Pasloski	480	44.7%	–
NDP	Stephen Dunbar-Edge	376	35.0%	–
Liberal	Dave Sloan	216	20.1%	–
Total		1,072	100.0%	–

=== Canadian federal election, 2008 ===
2008 Canadian federal election: Yukon
Party	Candidate	Votes	%	±%	Expenditures
Liberal	Larry Bagnell	6,715	45.80	–2.72	$56,300.78
Conservative	Darrell Pasloski	4,788	32.66	+8.99	$68,207.41
Green	John Streicker	1,881	12.83	+8.87	$16,498.57
New Democratic	Ken Bolton	1,276	8.70	–15.15	$13,004.16
Total valid votes/expense limit		14,660	99.59	–	$82,726.77
Total rejected ballots		61	0.41	–0.24	
Turnout		14,721	63.23	–2.87	
Eligible voters		23,281			
Liberal hold		Swing		–5.86	
Source: Elections Canada

== Personal life ==
Pasloski is married and has four grown children.
