= Marsh Lake, Yukon =

Coordinates: 60°31′00″N 134°19′59″W

Marsh Lake (Lingít: Kóoshdaa Xágu) is an unincorporated community on the Alaska Highway on the shores of Marsh Lake southeast of Whitehorse in Canada's Yukon. The area was organized in 2001, as a local area council to help the residents with some form of municipal government.

== Communities ==
The municipal boundary of the community of Marsh Lake extends along the Alaska Highway from the Yukon River bridge east of Whitehorse to include all of the residential areas up to Judas Creek along the Alaska Highway. Some of these residential subdivisions are generally referred to by their own names:

- Army Beach
- North M'Clintock
- South M'Clintock
- M'Clintock Valley Road
- Judas Creek
- Scout Bay
- M'Clintock Place
- Grayling Place
- Old Constabulary
- New Constabulary

== Demographics ==
Federal census population history of Marsh Lake
Year	Pop.	±%
2006	538	—
2011	619	+15.1%
2016	696	+12.4%
2021	746	+7.2%
Source: Statistics Canada

In the 2021 Census of Population conducted by Statistics Canada, Marsh Lake had a population of 746 living in 377 of its 527 total private dwellings, a change of 7.2% from its 2016 population of 696. With a land area of 817.11 km^{2} (315.49 sq mi), it had a population density of 0.9/km^{2} (2.4/sq mi) in 2021.

Panethnic groups in the Census subdivision of Marsh Lake (2016−2021)
Panethnic group	2021		2016	
Panethnic group	Pop.	%	Pop.	%
European (Note: Statistic includes all persons that did not make up part of a visible minority or an indigenous identity.)	700	93.96%	600	88.89%
Indigenous	35	4.7%	75	11.11%
South Asian	0	0%	0	0%
East Asian (Note: Statistic includes total responses of "Chinese", "Korean", and "Japanese" under visible minority section on census.)	0	0%	0	0%
African	0	0%	0	0%
Southeast Asian (Note: Statistic includes total responses of "Filipino" and "Southeast Asian" under visible minority section on census.)	0	0%	0	0%
Middle Eastern (Note: Statistic includes total responses of "West Asian" and "Arab" under visible minority section on census.)	0	0%	0	0%
Latin American	0	0%	0	0%
Other/multiracial (Note: Statistic includes total responses of "Visible minority, n.i.e." and "Multiple visible minorities" under visible minority section on census.)	0	0%	0	0%
Total responses	745	99.87%	675	96.98%
Total population	746	100%	696	100%
Note: Totals greater than 100% due to multiple origin responses

== Services ==
Part of the Whitehorse Census Agglomeration, Marsh Lake is a residential area most of whose residents work and do their business in Whitehorse. Originally a cottage community, the ease of the commute and the provision of power and phone has made it possible to start living in the community year-round, although many seasonal residences still exist.

The area is served by a volunteer fire and rescue service, as well as 911 calling for other emergency services out of Whitehorse.
