= John Edzerza =

Canadian politician

Minister of the Environment
- In office February 4, 2010 – November 5, 2011
- Premier: Dennis Fentie; Darrell Pasloski
- Preceded by: Elaine Taylor
- Succeeded by: Currie Dixon

Minister of Education
- In office November 30, 2002 – August 2, 2006
- Premier: Dennis Fentie
- Preceded by: Cynthia Tucker
- Succeeded by: Elaine Taylor

Minister of Justice
- In office July 12, 2004 – August 2, 2006
- Premier: Dennis Fentie
- Preceded by: Elaine Taylor
- Succeeded by: Elaine Taylor

Minister of the Public Service Commission
- In office November 30, 2002 – July 12, 2004
- Premier: Dennis Fentie
- Preceded by: Pam Buckway
- Succeeded by: Elaine Taylor

MLA for McIntyre-Takhini
- In office November 4, 2002 – October 11, 2011
- Preceded by: Wayne Jim
- Succeeded by: Constituency dissolved

Personal details
- Born: August 14, 1948 Lower Post, British Columbia
- Died: November 25, 2011 (aged 63) Whitehorse, Yukon
- Party: Yukon Party (2000-2006); Independent (2006); New Democrat (2006-2009); Independent (2009-2010); Yukon Party (2010-2011)

John Edzerza (August 14, 1948 – November 25, 2011) was a Canadian politician. He represented the electoral district of McIntyre-Takhini in the Yukon Legislative Assembly.

== Political career ==
Born in British Columbia in 1948, he first entered politics in 2002 as a Yukon Party MLA, and served as Minister of Justice and Minister of Education in Dennis Fentie's cabinet.

After disagreeing with a number of government decisions in early 2006, he resigned from the Yukon Party on August 2, 2006, to sit as an independent MLA, and recontested his seat in that fall's territorial election as a candidate of the Yukon New Democratic Party. He was re-elected, and served in the NDP caucus under Todd Hardy until January 2009, when he resigned from the NDP to sit again as an independent. He rejoined the Yukon Party on October 22, 2009, and served as Minister of the Environment until retiring in 2011. Edzerza died of leukemia on November 25, 2011.

== Electoral record ==
=== Yukon general election, 2006 ===
McIntyre-Takhini
Party	Candidate	Votes	%	±%
NDP	John Edzerza	336	38.8%	+7.0%
Liberal	Ed Schultz	328	37.9%	+15.4%
Yukon Party	Vicki Durrant	201	23.2%	-6.6%
Total		865	100.0%	–

=== Yukon general election, 2002 ===
McIntyre-Takhini
Party	Candidate	Votes	%	±%
Yukon Party	John Edzerza	288	31.8%	+4.7%
NDP	Maureen Stephens	270	29.8%	-4.7%
Liberal	Judy Gingell	204	22.5%	-15.9%
Independent	Wayne Jim	129	14.2%	+14.2%
Independent	Geoffrey Capp	15	1.7%	+1.7%
Total		906	100.0%	–

=== Yukon general election, 2000 ===
McIntyre-Takhini
Party	Candidate	Votes	%	±%
Liberal	Wayne Jim	376	38.4%	+18.1%
NDP	Piers McDonald	338	34.5%	-14.8%
Yukon Party	John Edzerza	265	27.1%	-0.9%
Total		979	100.0%	–
