= Stacey Hassard =

Canadian politician

Leader of the Opposition (Yukon)
- In office December 3, 2016 – April 12, 2021
- Preceded by: Elizabeth Hanson
- Succeeded by: Currie Dixon

Interim Leader of the Yukon Party
- In office November 17, 2016 – May 23, 2020
- Preceded by: Darrell Pasloski
- Succeeded by: Currie Dixon

Yukon Minister of Economic Development
- In office January 16, 2015 – December 3, 2016
- Preceded by: Currie Dixon
- Succeeded by: Ranj Pillai

Member of the Yukon Legislative Assembly for Pelly-Nisutlin
- In office October 11, 2011 – October 3, 2025
- Preceded by: Marian Horne
- Succeeded by: Riding abolished

Personal details
- Party: Yukon (territorial); Conservative (federal)

Stacey Hassard is a Canadian politician, who was elected to the Yukon Legislative Assembly in the 2011 election. He represented the electoral district of Pelly-Nisutlin as a member of the Yukon Party until 2025. He is a former leader of the Yukon's Official Opposition and the former interim leader of the Yukon Party.

== Political career ==
=== 33rd Legislative Assembly ===
Hassard entered territorial politics in 2011, defeated incumbent Yukon Party Cabinet minister Marian Horne for the party's nomination. He was elected later that year in the riding of Pelly-Nisutlin.

Hassard was elected Deputy Chair of Committee of the Whole in December 2011 and served in that capacity until his appointment to Cabinet in January 2015. During that time, he served as Chair of the Standing Committee on Appointments to Major Government Boards and Committees and vice-chair of the Standing Committee on Public Accounts. He was also a member of the Standing Committee on Statutory Instruments, the Select Committee on Whistle-blower Protection, and the Select Committee Regarding the Risks and Benefits of Hydraulic Fracturing.

Hassard was appointed to Cabinet on January 16, 2015, and served as Minister of Economic Development, the Minister responsible for the Yukon Housing Corporation, and the Minister responsible for the Yukon Liquor Corporation (including the Yukon Lottery Commission) during the remainder of the 33rd Legislative Assembly.

During his time as minister, Hassard received criticism for his handling of issues facing the community of Ross River, which is within his riding. Ross River at the time was plagued by semi-feral dogs attacking residents, and in one instance, killing a resident. Community leaders criticized Hassard for not visiting the community and not doing enough in the aftermath of the attacks.

Hassard was also criticized for his decision to award a sole-sourced $1.3-million contract to Whitehorse-based Total North Communications to upgrade internet speeds in Teslin, Carmacks, and Watson Lake. The Yukon Government's procurement support centre had analyzed the contract and recommended that it be put out for competition, but Hassard ignored the recommendation and awarded the contract directly to Total North.

As Minister responsible for the Yukon Liquor Corporation, Hassard also supported opening a liquor store in his home community of Teslin, citing the economic benefits it would bring the community. The proposal drew protest from the Village of Teslin and Teslin Tlingit Council, which presented a petition against the proposal and called for public consultations on the issue. In total, the petition, tabled by New Democrat Kate White on behalf of Teslin, contained 186 names; there are approximately 450 residents of Teslin. Ultimately, no liquor store opened in Teslin before the legislative assembly was dissolved in October 2016.

=== 34th Legislative Assembly ===
Hassard was re-elected comfortably on November 7, 2016, in his riding of Pelly-Nisutlin, thanks to strong support in Teslin and Faro (though not Ross River). He defeated both Yukon Green Party leader Frank de Jong and former Teslin Tlingit Chief Carl Sidney.

However, the Yukon Party government was defeated in that same election and its leader, Darrell Pasloski, lost his own seat. Hassard was elected as interim leader of the Yukon Party and interim Leader of the Official Opposition on November 17, 2016. In the 34th Legislative Assembly, he is currently the opposition for the Department of Highways and Public Works, the Executive Council Office (other than the Aboriginal relations branch), the French Language Services Directorate, and the Public Service Commission. He is also a member of the Standing Committee on Public Accounts.

=== 35th Legislative Assembly ===
In May 2021, he apologized after inappropriate text messages that she made about NDP leader Kate White and Liberal leader Sandy Silver were made public. Hassard served as the Official Opposition critic for Highways and Public Works. He did not run in the 2025 Yukon general election.

== Personal life ==
Hassard has worked in the construction industry and owned a local store and motel in Teslin. He is a former councilor and deputy mayor of the Village of Teslin.

Stacey is the brother of Dean Hassard, who previously represented the same district in the Yukon Legislative Assembly from 2002 to 2006.

Hassard lives in Teslin, Yukon.

== Electoral record ==
2021 Yukon general election: Pelly-Nisutlin
Party	Candidate	Votes	%	±%
Yukon Party	Stacey Hassard	362	50.77	+8.41
New Democratic	George Bahm	254	35.62	+4.31
Liberal	Katherine Alexander	97	13.60	-9.39
Total valid votes		713		
Total rejected ballots				
Turnout				
Eligible voters				
Yukon Party hold		Swing		+2.05
Source(s) "Unofficial Election Results 2021". Elections Yukon.

=== 2016 general election ===
Pelly-Nisutlin
Party	Candidate	Votes	%	±%
Yukon Party	Stacey Hassard	280	42.3%	-7.1%
NDP	Ken Hodgins	207	31.2%	-0.8%
Liberal	Carl Sidney	152	23.0%	+9.9%
Green	Frank de Jong	22	3.3%	+3.3%
Total		661	100.0%	–

=== 2011 general election ===
Pelly-Nisutlin
Party	Candidate	Votes	%	±%
Yukon Party	Stacey Hassard	275	49.4%	+7.3%
NDP	Carol Geddes	178	32.0%	+6.5%
Liberal	Carl Sidney	73	13.1%	-12.3%
Independent	Elvis Presley	31	5.5%	-1.5%
Total		557	100.0%	–
