= Pelly-Nisutlin =

Territorial electoral district in the Yukon, Canada

Yukon electoral district
- Boundaries of Pelly-Nisutlin

Defunct territorial electoral district
- Legislature: Yukon Legislative Assembly
- District abolished: 2025
- First contested: 2002
- Last contested: 2021

Demographics
- Electors (2021): 1,007
- Census subdivision(s): Faro, Johnsons Crossing, Ross River, Teslin (Teslin land), Teslin (village) Teslin Post 13, Yukon, Unorganized

Pelly-Nisutlin was an electoral district which returned a member (known as an MLA) to the Legislative Assembly of the Yukon Territory in Canada. It was created in 2002 out of the districts of Faro and Ross River-Southern Lakes. The riding includes the communities of Teslin, Faro, Ross River, Little Salmon, and Johnsons Crossing. It encompassed the traditional territory of the Teslin Tlingit Council and the Ross River Dena Council of the Kaska Dena. Pelly-Nisutlin is bordered by the rural ridings of Mayo-Tatchun, Lake Laberge, Mount Lorne-Southern Lakes, and Watson Lake. The riding was abolished after it was merged into Watson Lake-Ross River-Faro in 2025.

== Boundary commission controversy ==
Yukon electoral boundaries are examined by a commission every ten years to determine whether they should be adjusted. When Pelly-Nisutlin was created, it drew criticism from the Village of Teslin and the Teslin Tlingit Council, which argued that it should not be part of the same riding as Ross River and Faro, but rather Carcross and Tagish. There was concern not only that the MLA representing the district would face challenges representing and travelling to the communities of such a vast area (Faro is better accessed through Whitehorse), but also because there were greater commonalities between the Teslin Tlingit Council and the Carcross/Tagish First Nation.

Accordingly, the commission considered dismantling the electoral district and redistributing it into neighbouring districts, but rejected the option as it would create a greater imbalance between rural and urban seats in the Yukon. It also rejected the suggestion that Teslin form its own riding, since it was seen as too small in population. The report concluded: "while we acknowledge that the relationship of the Teslin area to the remainder of the electoral district is somewhat of an anomaly, we are unable to propose a justifiable solution other than to retain the district within its current boundaries."

== Members of the Legislative Assembly ==
Assembly	Years	Member	Party
31st	2002–2006	Dean Hassard	Yukon Party
32nd	2006–2011	Marian Horne	Yukon Party
33rd	2011–2016	Stacey Hassard	Yukon Party
34th	2016–2021	Stacey Hassard	Yukon Party
35th	2021–2025	Stacey Hassard	Yukon Party
Riding dissolved into Watson Lake-Ross River-Faro

== Election results ==
=== 2021 ===
2021 Yukon general election
Party	Candidate	Votes	%	±%
Yukon Party	Stacey Hassard	362	50.77	+8.41
New Democratic	George Bahm	254	35.62	+4.31
Liberal	Katherine Alexander	97	13.60	-9.39
Total valid votes		713		
Total rejected ballots				
Turnout				
Eligible voters				
Yukon Party hold		Swing		+2.05
Source(s) "Unofficial Election Results 2021". Elections Yukon.

=== 2016 ===
2016 Yukon general election
Party	Candidate	Votes	%	±%
Yukon Party	Stacey Hassard	280	42.3%	-7.1%
NDP	Ken Hodgins	207	31.2%	-0.8%
Liberal	Carl Sidney	152	23.0%	+9.9%
Green	Frank de Jong	22	3.3%	+3.3%
Total		661	100.0%	–

=== 2011 ===
2011 Yukon general election
Party	Candidate	Votes	%	±%
Yukon Party	Stacey Hassard	275	49.4%	+7.3%
NDP	Carol Geddes	178	32.0%	+6.5%
Liberal	Carl Sidney	73	13.1%	-12.3%
Independent	Elvis Presley	31	5.5%	-1.5%
Total		557	100.0%	–

=== 2006 ===
2006 Yukon general election
Party	Candidate	Votes	%	±%
Yukon Party	Marian Horne	241	42.1%	-4.3%
NDP	Gwen Wally	146	25.5%	+0.2%
Liberal	Hammond Dick	145	25.4%	-2.9%
Independent	Elvis Aaron Presley ("Tagish" Elvis)	40	7.0%	+7.0%
Total		572	100.0%	–

=== 2002 ===
2002 Yukon general election
Party	Candidate	Votes	%	±%
Yukon Party	Dean Hassard	297	46.4%	–
Liberal	Jim McLachlan	181	28.3%	–
NDP	Buzz Burgess	162	25.3%	–
Total		640	100.0%	–

== See also ==
- List of Yukon territorial electoral districts
- Canadian provincial electoral districts
