= Hassard =

Hassard is a surname. Notable people with the surname include:

- Bob Hassard (1929–2010), Canadian ice hockey player
- Dean Hassard, Canadian politician
- Frank Hassard, academic at the International Institute for Advanced Studies in Systems Research and Cybernetics, see Interactive democracy#Frank Hassard
- John Rose Greene Hassard (1836–1888), American newspaper editor and historian
- Michael Dobbyn Hassard (1817–1869), Irish politician
- Robert Pelham Hassard (1888–1953), Canadian politician
- Stacey Hassard, Canadian politician

== See also ==
- Hassard, Missouri, a community in the United States
