= List of municipalities in Yukon =

Location of Yukon in Canada

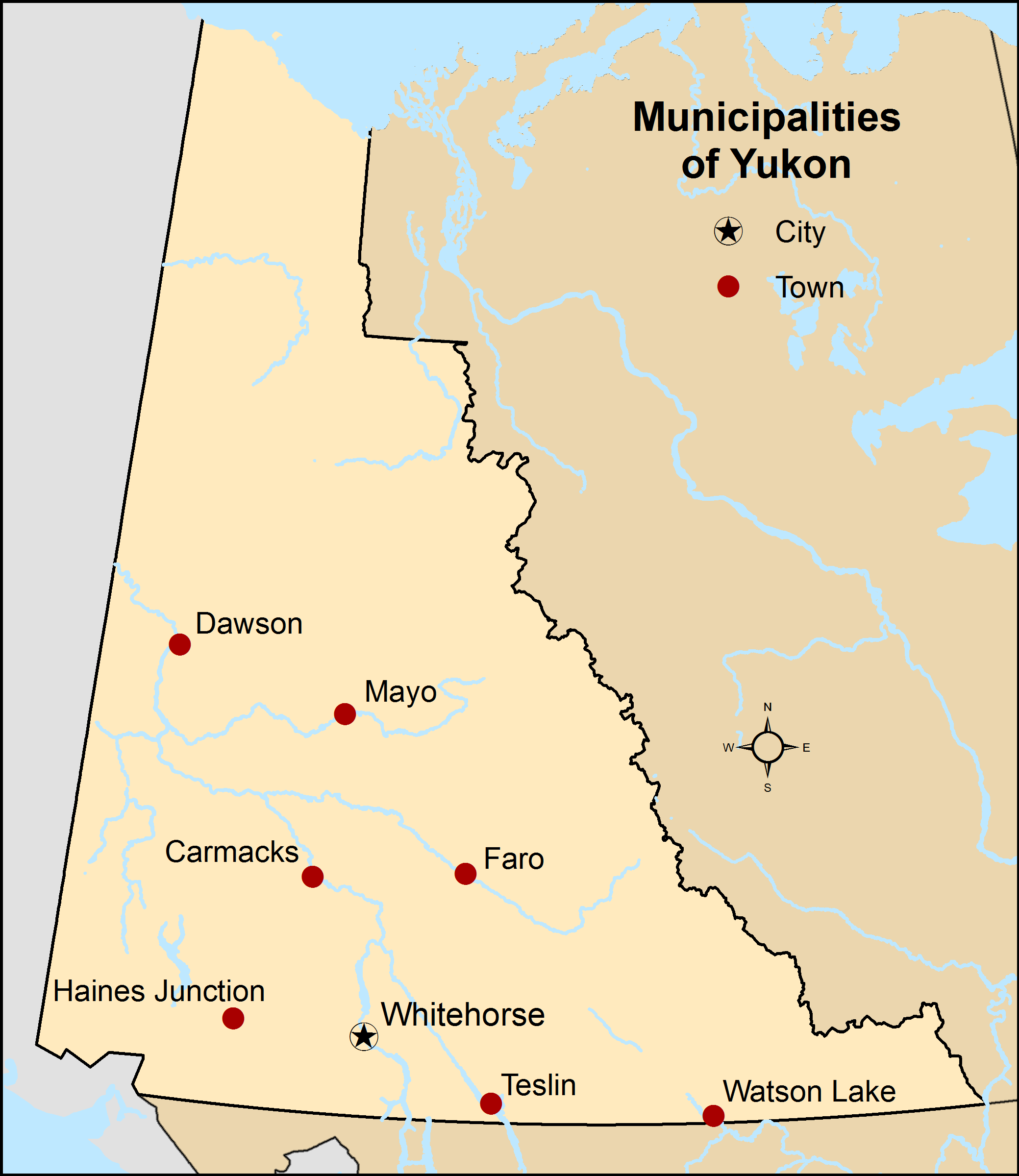
Distribution of Yukon's eight municipalities by type

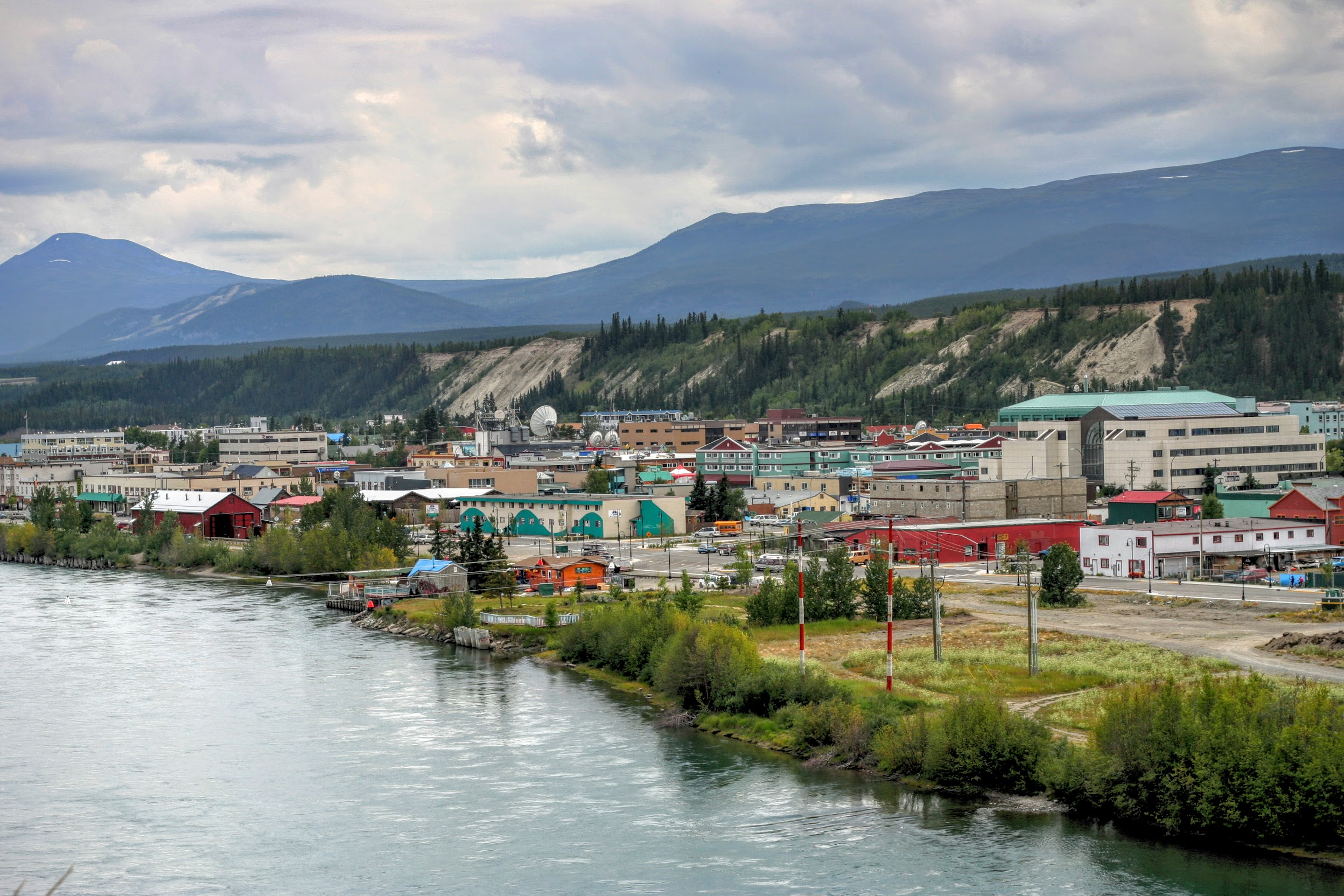
Whitehorse, Yukon's capital city and largest municipality

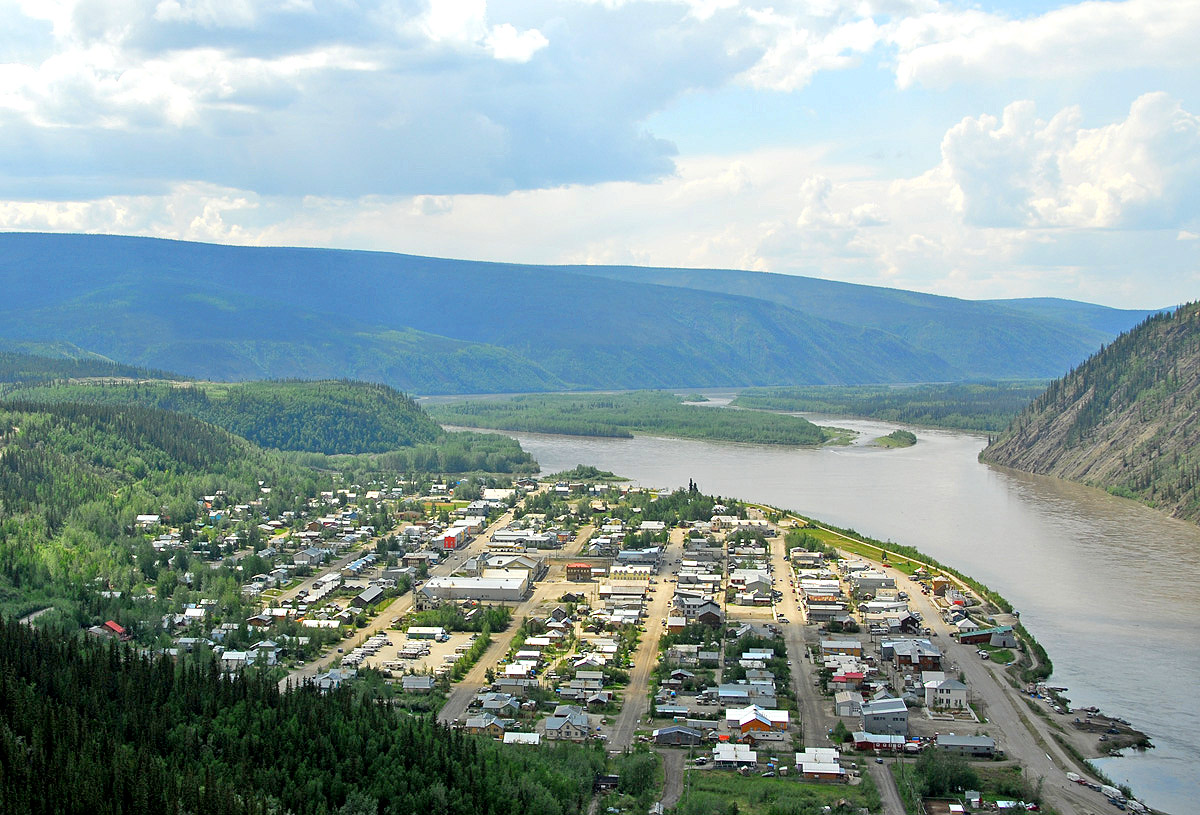
View of Dawson City with the Yukon River

Yukon is the second most populous of Canada's three territories with 40,232 residents as of 2021. It is the smallest territory in land area at 472,345 km^{2} (182,373 mi^{2}). Yukon's eight municipalities cover only 0.2% of the territory's land mass (Note: The remaining 99.8% of Yukon's land mass comprises two unincorporated hamlets, four unorganized areas, four Indian settlements, four self-governments (Indian reserves), thirteen unincorporated settlements and a Teslin land claim. Unorganized Yukon, one of the four unorganized areas, accounts for the vast majority of the territory's land mass, at 98.1%.) but are home to 72.2% of its population. The remainder of the territory's land area is unorganized.

Municipal governments are created by the Government of Yukon in accordance with the Municipal Act of 2001. Municipal governments provide "jurisdiction services, facilities, or things that a local government considers necessary or desirable for all or part of its community". Classifications of municipalities under the Municipal Act include cities and towns. Whitehorse is the capital of Yukon and its only city. The remaining seven municipalities are towns, of which four were villages that were continued as towns upon adoption of the 2001 Municipal Act.

Over two-thirds of the population of Yukon (28,201 residents; 70.1%) reside in Whitehorse, the largest municipality in the territory. It is also the largest municipality by land area at 413.94 km^{2} (159.82 mi^{2}). The smallest municipality by population and land area is Mayo, with 188 residents in 0.98 km^{2} (0.38 mi^{2}).

== Cities ==
A proposal to incorporate a community as a city can be initiated under the Municipal Act at the request of Yukon's Minister of Community Services, a municipal council, or a minimum 30% of residents that are eligible electors if the community has an estimated population over 2,500. Cities must elect a mayor and six councillors (in the case of Whitehorse), or a mayor and eight councillors if authorized by bylaw, for a three-year term. The only city in Yukon is Whitehorse, which is the largest of the three cities in Northern Canada's three territories. It had a population of 28,201 residents and a land area of 413.94 km^{2} (159.82 mi^{2}) in the 2021 Census. The City of Dawson is a former city in Yukon that now has town status but is permitted to retain "city" in its official name.

== Towns ==
A proposal to incorporate a community as a town can be initiated under the Municipal Act at the request of the Minister of Community Services, a municipal council, or a minimum 30% of residents that are eligible electors if the community has an estimated population over 300. Towns must elect a mayor and four councilors, or a mayor and five to seven councillors if authorized by bylaw, for a three-year term.

All municipalities that were villages prior to the adoption of the 2001 Municipal Act were continued as towns but were permitted to retain "village" in their official names. Yukon has seven towns. Dawson City is the territory's largest town by population with 1,577 residents and Faro is the largest by land area 199.89 km^{2} (77.18 mi^{2}). Mayo is the smallest town by population and land area at 188 residents in 1.06 km^{2} (0.41 mi^{2}).

== List of municipalities ==
List of municipalities in Yukon
Name	Status	Official name	Incorporation date	2021 Census of Population				
Name	Status	Official name	Incorporation date	Population (2021)	Population (2016)	Change	Land area (km^{2})	Population density (/km^{2})
Carmacks	Town	Village of Carmacks	November 1, 1984	588	493	+19.3%	36.87	15.9
Dawson	Town	City of Dawson (Note: As of the 2001 Municipal Act, the town's official legal name is the "City of Dawson".)	January 9, 1902	1,577	1,375	+14.7%	30.91	51.0
Faro	Town	Town of Faro	June 13, 1969	440	348	+26.4%	199.89	2.2
Haines Junction	Town	Village of Haines Junction	October 1, 1984	688	613	+12.2%	34.30	20.1
Mayo	Town	Village of Mayo	June 1, 1984	188	200	−6.0%	0.98	191.8
Teslin	Town	Village of Teslin	August 1, 1984	239	255	−6.3%	3.77	63.4
Watson Lake	Town	Town of Watson Lake	April 1, 1984	1,133	1,083	+4.6%	109.77	10.3
Whitehorse	City	City of Whitehorse	June 1, 1950	28,201	25,085	+12.4%	413.94	68.1
Total municipalities				33,054	29,452	+12.2%	830.43	39.8
Yukon				40,232	35,874	+12.1%	472,345.44	0.1

== See also ==
- List of designated places in Yukon
