= Paul Thériault =

Canadian politician

Leader of the Yukon Liberal Party
- In office 1992–1992
- Preceded by: Jim McLachlan
- Succeeded by: Jack Cable

Personal details
- Party: Liberal

Paul Thériault is a former Canadian politician who served as leader of the Yukon Liberal Party in 1992.

A school principal in Whitehorse, Thériault had resided in Yukon for just eighteen months when he sought the leadership. Prior to moving to Yukon, he had been a Saskatchewan Liberal Party candidate in the 1986 provincial election in Saskatchewan.

He became leader at a time when the party was moribund, as it was entirely shut out of the Legislative Assembly of Yukon in the 1989 election and had been effectively leaderless since the resignation of Jim McLachlan following that defeat.

In the hopes of uniting to defeat the incumbent Yukon New Democratic Party government in the 1992 election, Thériault entered coalition negotiations with John Ostashek's Yukon Party, but the negotiations failed.

In the election campaign, Thériault's Liberal platform included $22 million in spending cuts, the creation of a new government department of mines and energy, the splitting of the Yukon Development and Yukon Energy corporations, and a $30 million plan to improve sewage treatment. During the campaign, Thériault faced controversy when it was revealed that he had once unsuccessfully sought a Progressive Conservative Party of Canada nomination, and had run for the presidency of the federal New Democratic Party.

The party won just one seat in the 1992 election, that of Jack Cable in the electoral district of Riverside. Thériault himself was defeated in Riverdale South by Bea Firth. He announced his resignation as party leader in his concession speech, and was succeeded by Cable.
