= Whitehorse Centre =

Territorial electoral district in the Yukon, Canada

Yukon electoral district
- Interactive map of riding boundaries

Territorial electoral district
- Legislature: Yukon Legislative Assembly
MLA
Lane Tredger
New Democratic
- First contested: 1992
- Last contested: 2025

Demographics
- Electors (2021): 1,968
- Census subdivision: Whitehorse

Whitehorse Centre is a territorial electoral district of Yukon that has been represented in the Yukon Legislative Assembly since 1992.

The riding was created in 1992 from an amalgamation of the ridings of Whitehorse North Centre and Whitehorse South Centre. It underwent moderate boundary changes in 2002 following the dissolution of its neighboring riding of Riverside.

The district is considered a safe New Democratic seat; the party has won 9 of the last 10 elections since its creation.

== Geography ==
As of the 2025 general election, Whitehorse Centre comprises the downtown core of the City of Whitehorse, including Marwell and the area between the Yukon River and the escarpment. It is bordered by the districts of Riverdale North, Takhini, and Mountainview.

== Members of the Legislative Assembly ==
Assembly	Years	Member	Party
Whitehorse Centre
28th	1992–1996	Margaret Commodore	New Democratic
29th	1996–2000	Todd Hardy	New Democratic
30th	2000–2002	Mike McLarnon	Liberal
30th	2002–2002	Mike McLarnon	Independent
31st	2002–2006	Todd Hardy	New Democratic
32nd	2006–2010	Todd Hardy	New Democratic
32nd	2010–2011	Liz Hanson	New Democratic
33rd	2011–2016	Liz Hanson	New Democratic
34th	2016–2021	Liz Hanson	New Democratic
35th	2021–2025	Lane Tredger	New Democratic
36th	2025–Present	Lane Tredger	New Democratic

== Electoral results ==
=== 2025 ===
2025 Yukon general election
Party	Candidate	Votes	%	±%
New Democratic	Lane Tredger	425	49.88	+2.86
Yukon Party	Keith Jacobsen	350	41.08	+17.57
Liberal	Mellisa Kwok	77	9.04	-20.42
Total valid votes		852		
Total rejected ballots				
Turnout			39.54	
Eligible voters		2,155		
Source(s) "Unofficial Election Results 2025". Elections Yukon.

=== 2021 ===
2021 Yukon general election
Party	Candidate	Votes	%	±%
New Democratic	Emily Tredger (Note: Now known as Lane Tredger)	498	47.03	+3.2%
Liberal	Dan Curtis	312	29.46	-9.4%
Yukon Party	Eileen Melnychuk	249	23.51	+6.1%
Total valid votes		1,059		
Total rejected ballots				
Turnout				
Eligible voters				
New Democratic hold		Swing		+2.98
Source(s) "Unofficial Election Results 2021". Elections Yukon.

=== 2016 ===
2016 Yukon general election
Party	Candidate	Votes	%	±%
NDP	Liz Hanson	487	43.8%	-18.3%
Liberal	Tamara Goeppel	432	38.9%	+23.6%
Yukon Party	Doug Graham	193	17.4%	-6.5%
Total		1,112	100.0%	–

=== 2011 ===
2011 Yukon general election
Party	Candidate	Votes	%	±%
NDP	Liz Hanson	525	62.1%	+9.6%
Yukon Party	Marian Horne	202	23.9%	+3.2%
Liberal	Patrick Singh	104	12.3%	-13.9%
Total		846	100.0%	–

=== 2010 by-election ===
December 13, 2010 By-election
Party	Candidate	Votes	%	±%
NDP	Liz Hanson	356	51.6%	+5.0%
Liberal	Kirk Cameron	181	26.2%	-1.3%
Yukon Party	Mike Nixon	150	21.7%	-3.1%
Total		690	100.0%	–

- Held upon the death of Todd Hardy, July 28, 2010.

=== 2006 ===
2006 Yukon general election
Party	Candidate	Votes	%	±%
NDP	Todd Hardy	357	46.6%	+13.4%
Liberal	Bernie Phillips	211	27.5%	+3.4%
Yukon Party	Jerry Johnson	188	24.8%	+5.9%
Total		766	100.0%	–

=== 2002 ===
2002 Yukon general election
Party	Candidate	Votes	%	±%
NDP	Todd Hardy	300	33.2%	-0.7%
Liberal	Bernie Phillips	218	24.1%	-22.1%
Independent	Mike McLarnon	207	22.9%	–
Yukon Party	Vicki Durrant	171	18.9%	+0.3%
Total		904	100.0%	–

=== 2000 ===
2000 Yukon general election
Party	Candidate	Votes	%	±%
Liberal	Mike McLarnon	312	46.2%	+23.0%
NDP	Todd Hardy	229	33.9%	-11.9%
Yukon Party	Vicki Durrant	130	19.2%	-11.0%
Total		676	100.0%	–

=== 1996 ===
1996 Yukon general election
Party	Candidate	Votes	%	±%
NDP	Todd Hardy	328	45.8%	+8.3%
Yukon Party	Linda Dixon	216	30.2%	-7.0%
Liberal	Jon Breen	166	23.2%	-1.7%
Total		716	100.0%	–

=== 1992 ===
1992 Yukon general election
Party	Candidate	Votes	%	±%
NDP	Margaret Commodore	288	37.5%	–
Yukon Party	Chuck Rear	286	37.2%	–
Liberal	Phil Wheelton	191	24.9%	–
Total		768	100.0%	–

== See also ==
- List of Yukon territorial electoral districts
- Canadian provincial electoral districts
