= Wayne Jim =

Canadian politician

Minister of Government Services
- In office May 6, 2000 – 2002
- Premier: Pat Duncan

MLA for McIntyre-Takhini
- In office April 17, 2000 – November 4, 2002
- Preceded by: Piers McDonald
- Succeeded by: John Edzerza

Personal details
- Born: February 24, 1961 Whitehorse, Yukon, Canada
- Died: November 28, 2018 (aged 57) Whitehorse, Yukon, Canada
- Party: Liberal → Independent

Wayne Jim (February 24, 1961 – November 28, 2018) was a Canadian politician who represented the electoral district of McIntyre-Takhini in the Yukon Legislative Assembly from April 2000 to November 2002.

Jim was elected as a member of the Yukon Liberal Party in the 2000 election, unexpectedly defeating the Yukon NDP and Yukon Government Leader Piers McDonald. He was appointed Minister for Government Services by Yukon Premier Pat Duncan following the election. He was also appointed as a member of the Advisory Committee on Finance.

In 2002, Jim was dismissed from the post, and subsequently became one of three MLAs, along with Mike McLarnon and Don Roberts, who resigned or were dismissed from the Liberal caucus led by Premier Duncan, reducing Duncan's government to a minority. With a minority government, Duncan called an early election in 2002. Jim ran as an independent candidate, but came fourth to Yukon Party candidate John Edzerza.

Jim also served on many wildlife and fishery boards and as Kwanlin Dun First Nation councillor. In 2011, Jim came third when he ran for the position of Chief of the Kwanlin Dun.

== Electoral record ==
=== 2002 general election ===
McIntyre-Takhini
Party	Candidate	Votes	%	±%
Yukon Party	John Edzerza	288	31.8%	+5.1%
NDP	Maureen Stephens	270	29.8%	-4.3%
Liberal	Judy Gingell	204	22.5%	-15.4%
Independent	Wayne Jim	129	14.2%	+14.2%
Independent	Geoffrey Capp	15	1.7%	+1.7%
Total		906	100.0%	–

=== 2000 general election ===
McIntyre-Takhini
Party	Candidate	Votes	%	±%
Liberal	Wayne Jim	376	37.9%	+17.7%
NDP	Piers McDonald	338	34.1%	-14.9%
Yukon Party	John Edzerza	265	26.7%	-1.2%
Total		991	100.0%	–
