= Moira Lassen =

Weightlifting official

Moira Lassen (born October 5, 1963), mother of Jeane Lassen (2008 Olympian and multiple world medallist), and Leif Erik Lassen, is the first woman ever elected to the International Weightlifting Federation (IWF) Executive Board. Lassen, former Chair of the Canadian Association for the Advancement of Women and Sport and Physical Activity (CAAWS) also chairs the IWF Women's Commission.

Lassen became involved in the sport of weightlifting in 1995 because of her daughter's court case, Lassen vs Yukon Weightlifting Association, when the younger Lassen's membership was withdrawn causing her to potentially miss both the Canadian Championships and the Junior World Championships (the first event of its kind for junior women). Lassen went onto become the President of Yukon Weightlifting Association and a member of the Canadian Weightlifting Federation Board of Directors. Lassen held the position of Secretary General from 2000-2008.

Lassen was Team Canada's weightlifting team manager at the 2002 Commonwealth Games and started officiating internationally in 2003. Lassen was appointed to the IWF Scientific and Research Committee (2005-2009) and the IWF Technical Committee, the Doping Hearing Panel and the Constitution, Bylaw & Technical Commission (2009-2013) where she played an integral role in revamping the Technical and Competition Rules & Regulations (TCRR). In 2011, Lassen co-authored the IWF Technical Officials Roles and Responsibilities - A Guide to Competition. In 2013 Lassen made history by successfully winning her election to the IWF Executive Board becoming the first woman ever elected in the 108-year history of the sport federation. In 2015, Lassen was also Chair of the SportsTravel Magazine award-winning IWF World Weightlifting Championships 2015 hosted by the Harris County Houston Sports Authority. On June 6, 2020 Lassen called for the IWF Board to resign following the June 4 release of the McLaren Independent Weightlifting Investigation discovery of corruption and vote buying.

As an International Technical Official, Lassen has officiated at over 50 international events including Olympic Games, Youth Olympic Games, FISU, Pan American Games, Commonwealth Games and World Championships (Youth, Junior and Senior).

After two decades of working within Canada's national sport community, at Sport Yukon and AthletesCAN, Lassen moved overseas and held positions at London 2012 Olympic Games and Glasgow 2014 Commonwealth Games and was International Games Advisor to the Samoa Commonwealth Youth Games Organising Committee chaired by the Prime Minister of Samoa Tuilaepa Aiono Sailele Malielegaoi and was the Executive Operations Lead at the 2018 Commonwealth Games in Gold Coast, Australia. Currently Lassen is the General Manager of the Whitehorse 2020 Arctic Winter Games which was cancelled on March 7, 2020 due to the COVID-19 global pandemic. She continued as the Executive Director overseeing the 2026 Arctic Winter Games, where she has publicly defended the Games for not allowing boys to compete in figure skating for gender equity reasons, although has left the door open to future changes, while declining to make any commitment to allow boys to compete at future events.

As a practitioner Lassen has been involved in multiple research papers including Best Practices in Volunteer Management: An Action Planning Guide for Small and Rural Nonprofit Organizations and Promising Practices: Transitioning and Transitioned Athletes in Sport (2009) as well as an active arbitrator for Sport Law & Strategy Group.
