= Marian Horne =

Canadian politician

Minister of Justice
- In office 28 October 2006 – 5 November 2011
- Premier: Dennis Fentie
- Preceded by: Elaine Taylor
- Succeeded by: Mike Nixon

MLA for Pelly-Nisutlin
- In office 10 October 2006 – 11 October 2011
- Preceded by: Dean Hassard
- Succeeded by: Stacey Hassard

Personal details
- Party: Yukon Party
- Occupation: Accountant

Marian Horne is a Canadian politician, who represented the rural Yukon electoral district of Pelly-Nisutlin in the Yukon Legislative Assembly from 2006 to 2011. She is a member of the Yukon Party.

== Political career ==
Horne was elected to the Yukon Legislative Assembly for the rural Yukon riding of Pelly-Nisutlin on behalf of the Yukon Party in the 2006 Yukon election. Pelly-Nisutlin, though held by the Yukon Party, was being vacated when its incumbent MLA Dean Hassard opted to run in the downtown Whitehorse riding of Porter Creek South. Horne was elected comfortably on 10 October 2006, as part of Yukon Premier Dennis Fentie's re-elected majority government.

After the election, Horne was appointed Minister of Justice in Fentie's Cabinet, and served in that position throughout the 32nd Legislative Assembly. Horne was also appointed Minister responsible for the Women's Directorate on 3 July 2008. As Justice minister, Horne's department released a report in 2010 entitled Sharing Common Ground: Review of Yukon’s Police Force, which provided recommendations to improve the relationships between Yukon police and First Nations. Horne credits the report for ending the police practice of charging both the victim and the perpetrator of domestic violence.

Horne also worked with the Yukon College when she was minister to launch a training program for teachers, service providers, social workers, investigators, and law enforcement officers to foster empathetic approaches of handling people living with fetal alcohol spectrum disorder.

In 2011, Horne drew brief controversy when her vehicle was found double-parked in a handicap parking spot and she claimed she was unaware of how it got there. As Justice minister, Horne had championed harsher penalties for those found parking illegally in handicap spaces. She later paid a $250 fine to resolve the issue.

Horne intended to seek re-election in her riding of Pelly-Nisutlin as part of the 2011 Yukon election, but was defeated in her nomination by Stacey Hassard, brother of Horne's predecessor Dean Hassard. Horne publicly complained that she felt 'ambushed' by her riding association when Hassard defeated her. Later that same month, Horne announced she would run as the Yukon Party candidate in the downtown Whitehorse riding of Whitehorse Centre against Yukon New Democrat leader Liz Hanson as a parachute candidate. Horne was handily defeated by Hanson on election night.

== Personal life ==
Originally from the Yukon, Horne lived in Alberta and worked as a businesswoman and accountant for several decades before returning.

A member of the Teslin Tlingit Council, Horne worked for the Council prior to entering territorial politics as the Elders' Coordinator. She also worked as a business/marketing manager for the Teslin Tlingit Heritage Centre and as manager for the Teslin Housing Authority. She is certified as a Justice of the Peace in Teslin and served as the President of Teslin Historic and Museum Society.

After leaving politics, Horne was elected president of Yukon Aboriginal Women's Council, a non-profit aboriginal women's group, in 2013.

== Electoral record ==
=== 2011 general election ===
Whitehorse Centre
| Party | Candidate | Votes | % | ±% |
|---|---|---|---|---|
| NDP | Liz Hanson | 525 | 62.1% | +9.6% |
| Yukon Party | Marian Horne | 202 | 23.9% | +3.2% |
| Liberal | Patrick Singh | 104 | 12.3% | -13.9% |
| Total | | 846 | 100.0% | – |

=== 2006 general election ===
Pelly-Nisutlin
| Party | Candidate | Votes | % | ±% |
|---|---|---|---|---|
| Yukon Party | Marian Horne | 241 | 42.1% | -4.3% |
| NDP | Gwen Wally | 146 | 25.5% | +0.2% |
| Liberal | Hammond Dick | 145 | 25.4% | -2.9% |
| Independent | Elvis Aaron Presley ("Tagish" Elvis) | 40 | 7.0% | +7.0% |
| Total | | 572 | 100.0% | – |
