= Dean Hassard =

Canadian politician

MLA for Pelly-Nisutlin
- In office November 4, 2002 – October 10, 2006
- Preceded by: Constituency established
- Succeeded by: Marian Horne

Personal details
- Party: Yukon Party
- Occupation: Businessman

Dean Hassard is a Canadian politician. He represented the electoral district of Pelly-Nisutlin in the Yukon Legislative Assembly as a member of the Yukon Party from 2002 to 2006.

Hassard ran for the Yukon Party in the newly created riding of Pelly-Nisutlin in the snap election of 2002. Hassard ran against Liberal Jim McLachlan, the former Mayor of Faro and the incumbent MLA for Faro. McLachlan's riding had been dissolved to form part of Pelly-Nisutlin. Hassard beat McLachlan comfortably and joined the government of Yukon Premier Dennis Fentie, who defeated the incumbent Liberals.

During his term in office, Hassard served as a backbench MLA. He was a member of the Public Accounts Committee and the Regulatory Review Committee. He was also the Yukon Party's Caucus Whip and the Deputy Speaker of the Yukon Legislative Assembly.

After Hassard decided to move his family to Whitehorse permanently, he chose to stand as the Yukon Party's candidate in the Whitehorse riding of Porter Creek South in the 2006 territorial election. However, he was defeated by Liberal candidate Don Inverarity by just six votes.

Prior to his election to the legislature, Hassard was a businessman and municipal councilor in Teslin, Yukon. He is the brother of current Pelly-Nisutlin MLA Stacey Hassard, a former Cabinet minister, who is the incumbent Leader of the Opposition in the Yukon.

== Electoral record ==
=== 2006 general election ===
Porter Creek South
Party	Candidate	Votes	%	±%
Liberal	Don Inverarity	304	43.4%	-8.3%
Yukon Party	Dean Hassard	298	42.6%	+4.5%
NDP	Samson Hartland	97	13.9%	+3.8%
Total		700	100.0%	–

=== 2002 general election ===
Pelly-Nisutlin
Party	Candidate	Votes	%	±%
Yukon Party	Dean Hassard	297	46.4%	–
Liberal	Jim McLachlan	181	28.3%	–
NDP	Buzz Burgess	162	25.3%	–
Total		640	100.0%	–
