= McIntyre-Takhini =

Former territorial electoral district in the Yukon, Canada

Yukon electoral district
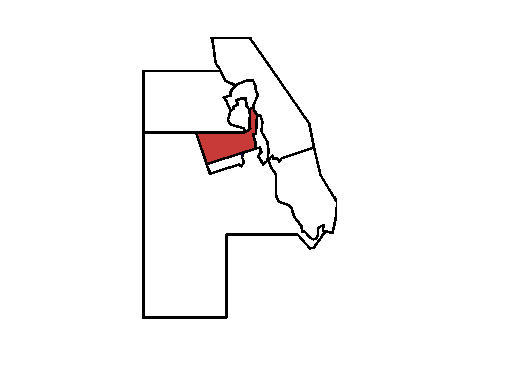
- McIntyre-Takhini in relation to other electoral districts in Whitehorse

Defunct territorial electoral district
- Legislature: Yukon Legislative Assembly
- District abolished: 2009
- First contested: 1992
- Last contested: 2006

McIntyre-Takhini is a former electoral district of the Legislative Assembly which existed from 1992 to 2009. It was dissolved in 2009 into the ridings Takhini-Kopper King and Mountainview. It contained the Whitehorse subdivisions of Takhini, Valleyview, and McIntyre, as well as the Kopper King, Takhini, and Northland mobile home parks.

It is the former riding of Yukon's 5th Premier, Piers McDonald.

== Members of the Legislative Assembly ==
Parliament	Years	Member	Party
28th	1992–1996	Piers McDonald	New Democrat
29th	1996–2000	Piers McDonald	New Democrat
30th	2000–2002	Wayne Jim	Liberal
30th	2002	Wayne Jim	Independent
31st	2002–2006	John Edzerza	Yukon Party
31st	2006	John Edzerza	Independent
32nd	2006–2009	John Edzerza	New Democrat
32nd	2009	John Edzerza	Independent
32nd	2009–2011	John Edzerza	Yukon Party

== Electoral results ==
=== 2006 ===
2006 Yukon general election
Party	Candidate	Votes	%	±%
NDP	John Edzerza	336	38.84	
Liberal	Ed Schultz	328	37.92	
Yukon Party	Vicki Durrant	201	23.24	–
Total		865	100.0	

=== 2002 ===
2002 Yukon general election
Party	Candidate	Votes	%	±%
Yukon Party	John Edzerza	288	31.8	–
NDP	Maureen Stephens	270	29.8	
Liberal	Judy Gingell	204	22.5	
Independent	Wayne Jim	129	14.2	
Independent	Geoffrey Capp	15	1.7	
Total		906	100.0	

=== 2000 ===
2000 Yukon general election
Party	Candidate	Votes	%	±%
Liberal	Wayne Jim	376	38.4	
NDP	Piers McDonald	338	34.5	
Yukon Party	John Edzerza	265	27.1	–
Total		979	100.0	

=== 1996 ===
1996 Yukon general election
Party	Candidate	Votes	%	±%
NDP	Piers McDonald	441	49.3	
Yukon Party	Scott Howell	251	28.0	–
Liberal	Rosemary Couch	182	20.3	
Independent	Clinton Fraser	21	2.4	
Total		895	100.0	

=== 1992 ===
1992 Yukon general election
Party	Candidate	Votes	%	±%
NDP	Piers McDonald	313	42.9	
Yukon Party	Scott Howell	290	39.8	–
Liberal	Larry Bill	126	17.3	
Total		729	100	

== See also ==
- List of Yukon territorial electoral districts
- Canadian provincial electoral districts
