= Jim McLachlan =

Canadian politician (born 1943)

MLA for Faro
- In office 1985–1989
- Preceded by: Maurice Byblow
- Succeeded by: Maurice Byblow

MLA for Faro
- In office 2000–2002
- Preceded by: Trevor Harding
- Succeeded by: riding dissolved

Leader of the Yukon Liberal Party
- In office May 9, 1986 – 1989
- Preceded by: Roger Coles
- Succeeded by: Paul Thériault

Personal details
- Born: September 1, 1943 (age 83) Flin Flon, Manitoba
- Party: Liberal

James Robert McLachlan is a former Canadian politician, who represented the electoral district of Faro in the Yukon Legislative Assembly from 1985 to 1989 and from 2001 to 2002. He was a member of the Yukon Liberal Party, and the party's leader from 1986 to 1989.

He became the party's interim leader after the resignation of Roger Coles due to criminal charges.

== Electoral record ==
=== 2002 general election ===
Pelly-Nisutlin
Party	Candidate	Votes	%	±%
Yukon Party	Dean Hassard	297	46.4%	–
Liberal	Jim McLachlan	181	28.3%	–
NDP	Buzz Burgess	162	25.3%	–
Total		640	100.0%	–

=== 2000 By-election ===
2000 Faro By-election
Party	Candidate	Votes	%	±%
Liberal	Jim McLachlan	129	65.5%	+42.6%
NDP	Harold Boehm	66	33.5%	-43.1%
Total		197	100.0%	–

- On the resignation of Trevor Harding (2000).

=== 2000 general election ===
Faro
Party	Candidate	Votes	%	±%
NDP	Trevor Harding	177	76.6%	-17.7%
Liberal	Jim McLachlan	53	22.9%	+17.7%
Total		231	100.0%	–

=== 1992 general election ===
Faro
Party	Candidate	Votes	%	±%
NDP	Trevor Harding	388	53.2%	+10.4%
Liberal	Jim McLachlan	337	46.2%	+9.1%
Total		729	100.0%	–

=== 1989 general election ===
Faro
Party	Candidate	Votes	%	±%
NDP	Maurice Byblow	194	42.8%	+9.3%
Liberal	Jim McLachlan	168	37.1%	-2.2%
Progressive Conservative	Mel Smith	90	19.9%	-7.0%
Total		453	100.0%	–

=== 1985 general election ===
Faro
Party	Candidate	Votes	%	±%
Liberal	Jim McLachlan	142	39.3%	+17.1%
NDP	Sibyl Frei	121	33.5%	-15.8%
Progressive Conservative	Ted Bartsch	97	26.9%	-1.4%
Total		361	100.0%	–
