= Jeane Lassen =

Canadian weightlifter (born 1980)

Personal information
- Full name: Jeane Elizabeth Lassen
- Born: 26 September 1980 (age 46) Victoria, British Columbia, Canada
Medal record
World Championships
Bronze medal – third place	2006 Santo Domingo	69 kg
Pan American Championships
Gold medal – first place	2008 Callao	– 75 kg

Jeane Elizabeth Lassen (born 26 September 1980) is a Canadian weightlifter. Lassen is from Whitehorse, Yukon and is one of few Yukon athletes to break into the world scene and is Yukon's first Summer Olympian. Weightlifting official Moira Lassen is her mother.

At 14 years old, Lassen won a silver medal in the women's 59 kg category at the 1995 Canada Winter Games in Grande Prairie, Alberta and still holds the Games record in the Clean & Jerk. She also won the Roland Michener Award for her leadership on and off the field of play. This, of course, was before she became a national athlete. Lassen qualified to compete at the 1995 Canadian Championships and the 1995 Junior World Weightlifting Championships (the first junior international event for women) however Lassen had to go to court to do so. Lassen competed at six Junior World Weightlifting Championships (1995-2000) and is one of the few athletes, both men and women, in the world to do so. She is a three-time silver medallist at the Junior World Championships (1997, 1998) and 15-time medallist at the University World Championships.

Lassen was the 2006 Commonwealth Games champion in the 69 kg category and still holds the Games record in the clean and jerk.

Later that year Lassen competed in the women's 69 kg class at the 2006 World Weightlifting Championships and won the bronze medal in Total and silver medal in the clean and jerk, She snatched 102 kg and jerked an additional 136 kg for a total of 238 kg becoming the first Canadian woman in 17 years to win a medal in Total at the World Championships. At the 2007 World Weightlifting Championships she ranked 6th and won the gold medal at the 2008 Pan-American Championships, with a total of 237 kg.

At the 2008 Summer Olympics, lifting a total of 240 kg Lassen ranked 8th in the 75 kg category. Due to the IOC 2008 doping retests Lassen moved to 5th place. Lassen was inducted into the Yukon Sport Hall of Fame in 2018. Lassen was a member of Team Canada as Athlete Mentor at the 2018 Winter Olympics in Pyeongchang, South Korea.

During the 2014 Commonwealth Games held in Glasgow, Lassen commentated on the weightlifting alongside David Goldstrom.

Lassen holds a Bachelor of Education from McGill University, with a speciality in English Second Language, and a Sports Performance degree from Camosun College. She is bilingual in English and French and conversant in Italian and Spanish.

She is former Executive Board member of the Canadian athletes' organization AthletesCAN, and Development and Education Commission for the International Weightlifting Federation and is currently the Athlete Representative on the Canada Games Council Sport Committee.

Lassen formally announced on February 18, 2016, her intent to run for the Yukon Liberal Party in her home riding of Takhini-Kopper King in the 2016 Yukon election. However, she was defeated by New Democrat incumbent Kate White in the ensuing campaign.

== Electoral record ==
=== 2016 general election ===
Takhini-Kopper King
Party	Candidate	Votes	%	±%
NDP	Kate White	605	46.1%	+0.2%
Liberal	Jeane Lassen	478	36.4%	+14.0%
Yukon Party	Vanessa Innes	229	17.5%	-14.2%
Total		1312	100.0%	–
