= Lane Tredger =

Canadian politician

Lane Tredger MLA

House Leader of the Yukon New Democratic Party
- Incumbent
- Assumed office April 12, 2021

Member of the Yukon Legislative Assembly for Whitehorse Centre
- Incumbent
- Assumed office April 12, 2021
- Preceded by: Elizabeth Hanson

Personal details
- Born: Emily Tredger
- Party: Yukon New Democratic Party
- Occupation: Speech pathologist

Lane Tredger (formerly Emily Tredger) is a Canadian politician, who was elected to the Yukon Legislative Assembly in the 2021 Yukon general election. They represent the electoral district of Whitehorse Centre as a member of the Yukon New Democratic Party.

In the 35th Legislature of Yukon, Tredger served as the Yukon New Democratic Party House Leader and the Deputy Chair of Committee of the Whole of the Yukon Legislative Assembly. They also served as the Third Party critic for Housing, Environment, Highways and Public Works, the Women’s Directorate, the Yukon Liquor Corporation, Yukon Lotteries, the Yukon Energy Corporation, and the Yukon Development Corporation.

== Personal life ==
Prior to their election to the legislature, Tredger worked as a speech pathologist in Whitehorse; served as executive director of Teegatha’Oh Zheh, an organization supporting Yukon residents with developmental disabilities; and served as president of the Queer Yukon Society.

Tredger came out as non-binary and changed their name in March 2023, making them Yukon's first out non-binary MLA. Tredger is married and has two twin children, born in 2024.

== Electoral record ==
2025 Yukon general election: Whitehorse Centre
Party	Candidate	Votes	%	±%
New Democratic	Lane Tredger	425	49.88	+2.86
Yukon Party	Keith Jacobsen	350	41.08	+17.57
Liberal	Mellisa Kwok	77	9.04	-20.42
Total valid votes		852		
Total rejected ballots				
Turnout			39.54	
Eligible voters		2,155		
Source(s) "Unofficial Election Results 2025". Elections Yukon.

2021 Yukon general election: Whitehorse Centre
Party	Candidate	Votes	%	±%
New Democratic	Emily Tredger (Note: Now known as Lane Tredger)	498	47.03	+3.2%
Liberal	Dan Curtis	312	29.46	-9.4%
Yukon Party	Eileen Melnychuk	249	23.51	+6.1%
Total valid votes		1,059		
Total rejected ballots				
Turnout				
Eligible voters				
New Democratic hold		Swing		+2.98
Source(s) "Unofficial Election Results 2021". Elections Yukon.
