= Elizabeth Hanson =

Canadian politician (born 1951)

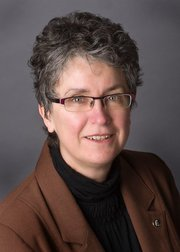

Leader of the Official Opposition of Yukon
- In office October 11, 2011 – December 3, 2016
- Preceded by: Arthur Mitchell
- Succeeded by: Stacey Hassard

Leader of the Yukon New Democratic Party
- In office September 26, 2009 – May 5, 2019
- Preceded by: Todd Hardy
- Succeeded by: Kate White

Member of the Yukon Legislative Assembly for Whitehorse Centre
- In office December 13, 2010 – March 12, 2021
- Preceded by: Todd Hardy
- Succeeded by: Emily Tredger

Personal details
- Born: 1951 (age 74–75) Edmonton, Alberta
- Party: New Democrat
- Education: University of Calgary

Elizabeth Hanson (born 1951), also known as Liz Hanson, is a Canadian politician from the Yukon. She was the leader of the Yukon New Democratic Party from 2009 until 2019, and represented the electoral district of Whitehorse Centre in the Yukon Legislative Assembly from 2010 to 2021.

On November 22, 2018, Hanson announced her intent to resign as leader of the Yukon NDP.

== Early life ==
Prior to attending university, Hanson's resume included involvement with high school student council, youth groups and community social action/justice movements including organizing committee(s) Miles for Millions, Arusha Cross Cultural Centre. Hanson attended the University of Calgary and obtained degrees in political science and social work.

After graduating university, Hanson took a job as a social worker in Souris, Prince Edward Island.

In Yukon, Hanson first worked as a regional social worker for the Department of Indian and Inuit Affairs, with a region that spanned from Old Crow, Yukon to Good Hope Lake, British Columbia. She subsequently worked for INAC in Nanaimo, British Columbia and in Ottawa, returning to Yukon in 1989 to lead a federal self-government negotiations team.

She served as Yukon director of land claims and Indian government for the federal government until 2003, when she became the regional director general of Indian and Northern Affairs Canada in the Yukon, charged with reorganizing the department's regional presence to reflect the federal presence "post land claims and devolution". She retired from this position in 2007.

Hanson and her family completed a federal interchange to Canberra, Australia, with the Aboriginal and Torres Islander Commission.

She owns a property at Crag Lake, Yukon.

== Political career ==
After her retirement from INAC, Hanson became actively involved with the Yukon New Democratic Party and became president of the party.

On September 26, 2009, Hanson was acclaimed as leader of the Yukon NDP, following the resignation of previous leader Todd Hardy, who had resigned due to an ongoing struggle with leukemia. Following Hardy's death on July 28, 2010, Hanson won the resulting by-election on December 13, 2010 in Whitehorse Centre by a large margin. She retained her seat comfortably in the 2011 election, leading the Yukon New Democrats from third party status to Official Opposition, with six of the legislature's 19 seats.

During both the 32nd and 33rd Legislative Assemblies, Hanson served on the Members’ Services Board and the Standing Committee on Public Accounts. She chaired the Standing Committee on Public Accounts in the 33rd Legislative Assembly (2011-2016).

Hanson sought re-election again in 2016 election, and although she was narrowly successful in her own riding, Hanson's party lost four of its six seats to the Yukon Liberals and was reduced to third party status - it was also the Yukon New Democrat's worst electoral showing since 1978. The Yukon Liberals, formerly the Third Party, formed a majority government. Hanson has stayed on as New Democrat leader since the election. She is currently a member of the Members' Services Board, the Standing Committee on Public Accounts, and the Standing Committee on Rules, Elections and Privileges. Additionally, she serves as the New Democrat caucus critic for the Department of Finance, the Executive Council Office, the Department of Energy, Mines and Resources, the Department of Economic Development, the Department of Justice, the Department of Highways and Public Works, the Public Service Commission, the Department of Tourism and Culture, the Yukon Workers Compensation Health and Safety Board, and the Yukon Liquor Corporation.

Hanson announced her intent to resign as leader of the Yukon New Democrats in November 2018, though she remained as MLA for Whitehorse Centre. A leadership convention to replace her on May 4, 2019 selected Kate White as the next leader of the Yukon NDP.

Hanson endorsed Ontario Member of Parliament Charlie Angus for leader of the federal New Democrats in the race to replace outgoing leader Thomas Mulcair. Hanson cited Angus' "commitment to reconciliation, and understanding economic inequalities that are only amplified in the North", in addition to their history of collaboration, as reasons for her endorsement. Angus ultimately lost to Ontario MPP Jagmeet Singh.

== Electoral record ==
=== 2016 general election ===
Whitehorse Centre
Party	Candidate	Votes	%	±%
NDP	Liz Hanson	487	43.8%	-18.3%
Liberal	Tamara Goeppel	432	38.9%	+23.6%
Yukon Party	Doug Graham	193	17.4%	-6.5%
Total		1,112	100.0%	–

=== 2011 general election ===
Whitehorse Centre
Party	Candidate	Votes	%	±%
NDP	Liz Hanson	525	62.1%	+9.6%
Yukon Party	Marian Horne	202	23.9%	+3.2%
Liberal	Patrick Singh	104	12.3%	-13.9%
Total		846	100.0%	–

=== 2010 by-election ===
Whitehorse Centre
Party	Candidate	Votes	%	±%
NDP	Liz Hanson	356	51.6%	+5.0%
Liberal	Kirk Cameron	181	26.2%	-1.3%
Yukon Party	Mike Nixon	150	21.7%	-3.1%
Total		690	100.0%	–

- Held upon the death of Todd Hardy, July 28, 2010.
