= Dave Keenan =

Canadian politician

MLA for Ross River-Southern Lakes
- In office 1996–2002
- Preceded by: Willard Phelps
- Succeeded by: riding dissolved

Personal details
- Born: 1951 (age 74–75)
- Party: NDP

Dave Keenan (born 1951) is a former Canadian politician, who served in the Legislative Assembly of Yukon from 1996 to 2002. He represented the electoral district of Ross River-Southern Lakes as a member of the Yukon New Democratic Party, and served in the cabinet of Piers McDonald as Minister of Community and Transportation Services.

Prior to his election to the legislature, Keenan served as chief of the Teslin Tlingit Council from 1988 to 1996.
