= Don Roberts (politician) =

Former Canadian politician

MLA for Porter Creek North
- In office 2000–2002
- Preceded by: John Ostashek
- Succeeded by: Jim Kenyon

Personal details
- Party: Liberal → Independent

Don Roberts is a former Canadian politician who represented the electoral district of Porter Creek North in the Yukon Legislative Assembly from 2000 to 2002.

He was elected as a member of the Yukon Liberal Party in the 2000 election and served as the Minister for Health. In 2002, he was one of three MLAs, along with Mike McLarnon and Wayne Jim, who resigned from the Liberal Party caucus. The resignations were designed to protest the leadership of Pat Duncan, sending Duncan's government into a minority. He did not run for re-election in the 2002 election.
