= Trevor Harding =

Canadian politician (born 1965)

MLA for Faro
- In office 1992–2000
- Preceded by: Maurice Byblow
- Succeeded by: Jim McLachlan

Leader of Official Opposition of Yukon
- In office 2000–2000
- Preceded by: Pat Duncan
- Succeeded by: Eric Fairclough

Leader of the Yukon New Democratic Party
- In office 2000–2000
- Preceded by: Piers McDonald
- Succeeded by: Eric Fairclough

Personal details
- Born: August 20, 1965 (age 60) Shelburne, Nova Scotia
- Party: New Democrat

Trevor Harding is a Canadian politician, who represented the electoral district of Faro in the Yukon Legislative Assembly from 1992 to 2001.

A member of the Yukon New Democratic Party, he served as the party's interim leader in 2000 following the resignation of Piers McDonald. Following his stint as the party's interim leader, he resigned from the legislature and was succeeded by Jim McLachlan of the Yukon Liberal Party in a by-election.

Following his retirement from politics, Harding moved to Calgary, Alberta and launched Zero Gravity, a marketing and communications company.

== Electoral record ==
=== 2000 general election ===
Faro
Party	Candidate	Votes	%	±%
NDP	Trevor Harding	177	76.6%	-17.7%
Liberal	Jim McLachlan	53	22.9%	+17.7%
Total		231	100.0%	–

=== 1996 general election ===
Faro
Party	Candidate	Votes	%	±%
NDP	Trevor Harding	530	94.3%	+41.1%
Liberal	Ed Peake	29	5.2%	-41.0%
Total		562	100.0%	–

=== 1992 general election ===
Faro
Party	Candidate	Votes	%	±%
NDP	Trevor Harding	388	53.2%	+10.4%
Liberal	Jim McLachlan	337	46.2%	+9.1%
Total		729	100.0%	–
