= Mike McLarnon =

Canadian politician

MLA for Whitehorse Centre
- In office 2000–2002
- Preceded by: Todd Hardy
- Succeeded by: Todd Hardy

Personal details
- Born: June 23, 1965 (age 60) Whitehorse, Yukon
- Party: Liberal → Independent

Mike McLarnon is a former Canadian politician who represented the electoral district of Whitehorse Centre in the Yukon Legislative Assembly from 2000 to 2002.

McLarnon was born and raised in Whitehorse, Yukon and operated several businesses in Whitehorse until assuming political office in the Yukon Legislature. While in office, he served as the Deputy Speaker of the Yukon Legislature and the Chair of the Committee of the Whole. He also served on the Standing Committee on Public Accounts on behalf of the Yukon.

He was elected as a member of the Yukon Liberal Party in the 2000 election. In that election, he beat out the incumbent MLA Todd Hardy, who was the NDP candidate, and Vicky Durrant, the Yukon Party candidate, by a wide margin. However, in 2002 he was one of three MLAs, along with Wayne Jim and Don Roberts, who resigned from the Liberal Party caucus in 2002 to protest the leadership of Pat Duncan, effectively reducing Duncan's government to a minority.

He continued to sit as an independent until the time that the following election was called. Analysts claim that the Liberal party's newfound minority party status and subsequent pressure from the opposition is what eventually led to the end of the Liberal party's position in the legislature.

In the resulting 2002 election, McLarnon ran as an independent candidate and was defeated by New Democratic Party leader Todd Hardy.

Prior to operating his own business and eventually running for political office, McLarnon pursued his higher education at Carleton University (Ottawa) and the British Columbia Institute of Technology (Vancouver). While at Carleton University, McLarnon served in the House of Commons Page Program.

McLarnon is married and continues to maintain residence in Whitehorse. He is a recipient of the Queen Elizabeth II Golden Jubilee Medal for his work in representing the political interests of Yukoners.
