= Takhini =

Territorial electoral district in the Yukon, Canada

Yukon electoral district
- Interactive map of riding boundaries

Territorial electoral district
- Legislature: Yukon Legislative Assembly
MLA
Kate White
New Democratic
- District created: 2009
- First contested: 2011
- Last contested: 2025

Demographics
- Electors (2021): 2,128
- Census subdivision: Whitehorse

Takhini (formerly Takhini-Kopper King) is a territorial electoral district of Yukon that has been represented in the Yukon Legislative Assembly since 2011.

The riding was established in 2009 out of much of the former district of McIntyre-Takhini. In accordance with the Yukon Electoral District Boundaries Act (2024), it underwent moderate boundary changes and was renamed Takhini for the 2025 Yukon general election.

Since 2011, the district has been represented Kate White, leader of the Yukon New Democratic Party.

== Geography ==
As of the 2025 election, Takhini comprises the Whitehorse subdivisions of Takhini and Raven's Ridge, as well as Kopper King, Northland mobile home parks, and the residences along Fish Lake Road. Yukon University and the Whitehorse Correctional Centre are also located in the district; however, under Yukon election law, inmates’ votes are counted in their home riding.

== MLAs ==
Assembly	Years	Member	Party
Takhini-Kopper King; Riding created from McIntyre-Takhini
33rd	2011–2016	Kate White	New Democratic
34th	2016–2021	Kate White	New Democratic
35th	2021–2025	Kate White	New Democratic
Takhini
36th	2025–Present	Kate White	New Democratic

== Election results ==
=== 2025 ===
2025 Yukon general election
Party	Candidate	Votes	%	±%
New Democratic	Kate White	627	56.64	-6.68
Yukon Party	Logan Freese	391	35.32	+15.07
Liberal	Abdullah Khalid	89	8.04	-8.39
Total valid votes		1,107		
Total rejected ballots				
Turnout				
Eligible voters				
New Democratic hold		Swing		-10.9

2021 Yukon general election redistributed results
Party	Votes	%
New Democratic	639	62.40
Yukon Party	220	21.48
Liberal	165	16.11

=== 2021 ===
2021 Yukon general election: Takhini-Kopper King
Party	Candidate	Votes	%	±%
New Democratic	Kate White	763	63.32	+17.21%
Yukon Party	Morgan Yuill	244	20.25	+2.80%
Liberal	Raj Murugaiyan	198	16.43	-20.00%
Total valid votes		1,205		
Total rejected ballots				
Turnout				
Eligible voters				
New Democratic hold		Swing		+7.21
Source(s) "Unofficial Election Results 2021". Elections Yukon.

=== 2016 ===
2016 Yukon general election
Party	Candidate	Votes	%	±%
NDP	Kate White	605	46.11%	+0.22%
Liberal	Jeane Lassen	478	36.43%	+13.99%
Yukon Party	Vanessa Innes	229	17.45%	-14.21%
Total		1312	100.0%	–

=== 2011 ===
2011 Yukon general election
Party	Candidate	Votes	%	±%
NDP	Kate White	458	45.89%	–
Yukon Party	Samson Hartland	316	31.66%	–
Liberal	Cherish Clarke	224	22.44%	–
Total		998	100.0%	–

== See also ==
- List of Yukon territorial electoral districts
- Canadian provincial electoral districts
