= Kate White (politician) =

Canadian politician

Kate White MLA
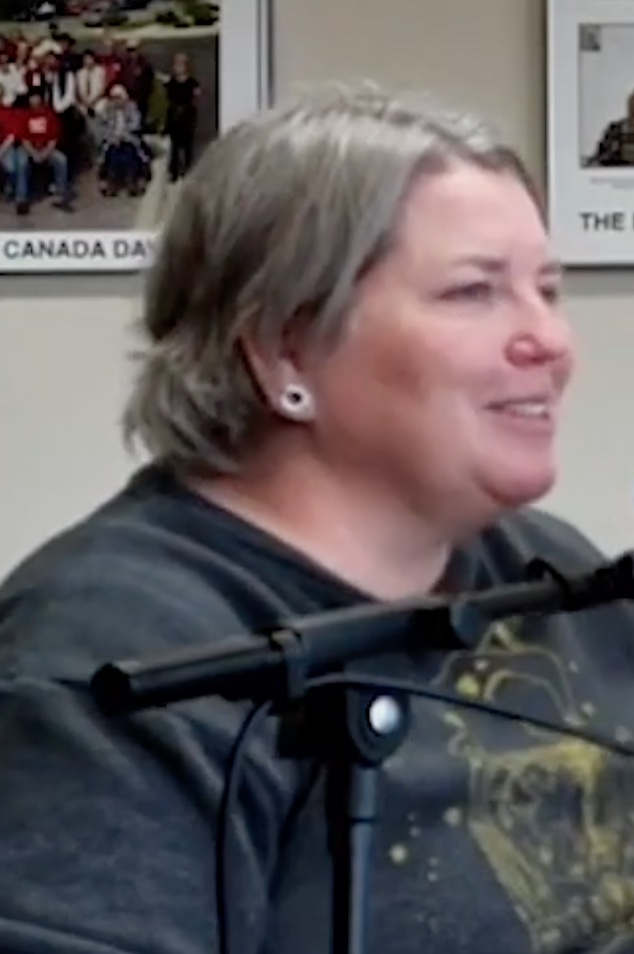
- White in 2025

Leader of the Opposition in Yukon
- Incumbent
- Assumed office November 3, 2025
- Preceded by: Currie Dixon

Leader of the Yukon New Democratic Party
- Incumbent
- Assumed office May 4, 2019
- Preceded by: Elizabeth Hanson

Member of the Yukon Legislative Assembly for Takhini
- Incumbent
- Assumed office October 11, 2011
- Preceded by: District created

Personal details
- Born: April 6, 1977 (age 49)
- Party: New Democratic

Kate White (born 1977) is a Canadian politician who has served as leader of the Yukon New Democratic Party since 2019. She was elected to the Yukon Legislative Assembly in the 2011 election. She represents the Whitehorse electoral district of Takhini, formerly known as Takhini-Kopper King.

== Political career ==
White first entered territorial politics in the 2006 election, when she ran in the riding of Porter Creek Centre for the Yukon New Democratic Party against incumbent Yukon Party Cabinet minister Archie Lang. She finished third.

In 2011, she ran again for the NDP in the newly created riding of Takhini-Kopper King, defeating former Whitehorse City Councillor Samson Hartland to win the riding. She was part of the Official Opposition in the 33rd Legislative Assembly served on the Standing Committee on Appointments to Major Government Boards and Committees. She was re-elected in 2016 election, defeating popular Yukon Olympian and Liberal candidate Jeane Lassen. She was one of just two New Democrat caucus members to be re-elected in that election, which was the party's worst showing since 1978.

Prior to assuming her current role, White was the party's critic for Community Services, Education, Health and Social Services, Environment, the Yukon Housing Corporation, the Women's Directorate, the French Language Services Directorate, the Yukon Development Corporation, the Yukon Energy Corporation, and the Yukon Lottery Commission. She was also the Third Party House Leader and sat on the Standing Committee on Statutory Instruments and the Standing Committee on Appointments to Major Government Boards and Committees.

White is widely regarded as a passionate advocate for the rights of mobile homeowners within her riding, which contains three mobile home parks.

On February 1, 2019, White announced her intent to succeed Liz Hanson as Leader of the Yukon New Democratic Party.

In May 2019, White was acclaimed as the new party leader, replacing Hanson. In the 2021 election, the Yukon NDP under White won three seats. On April 23, the incumbent Liberals were sworn in with a minority government. On April 29, the Yukon Liberals and NDP announced that they had struck a formal confidence and supply agreement to allow the Liberals to form a minority government. The deal was renewed and revised in 2023, after White apologized for a rent cap policy that led to no-cause evictions.

She led her party into the 2025 Yukon general election, where the Yukon NDP formed the official opposition.

== Personal life ==
Before entering politics, White earned a culinary diploma and a Red Seal in baking. She has also worked in the mining industry and as a life skills coach with women within the Yukon's correctional system.

She is bilingual in English and French.

== Electoral record ==
2025 Yukon general election: Takhini
| Party | Candidate | Votes | % | ±% |
|---|---|---|---|---|
| New Democratic | Kate White | 627 | 56.64 | –5.76 |
| Yukon Party | Logan Freese | 391 | 35.32 | +13.84 |
| Liberal | Abdullah Khalid | 89 | 8.04 | –8.07 |
| Total valid votes | | 1,107 | | |
| Total rejected ballots | | | | |
| Turnout | | | 51.23 | |
| Eligible voters | | 2,161 | | |
| New Democratic hold | | Swing | | –9.80 |
Source(s) "2025 General Election Official Results". Elections Yukon.

2021 Yukon general election: Takhini-Kopper King
| Party | Candidate | Votes | % | ±% |
|---|---|---|---|---|
| New Democratic | Kate White | 763 | 63.32 | +17.21% |
| Yukon Party | Morgan Yuill | 244 | 20.25 | +2.80% |
| Liberal | Raj Murugaiyan | 198 | 16.43 | -20.00% |
| Total valid votes | | 1,205 | | |
| Total rejected ballots | | | | |
| Turnout | | | | |
| Eligible voters | | | | |
| New Democratic hold | | Swing | | +7.21 |
Source(s) "Unofficial Election Results 2021". Elections Yukon.

=== 2016 general election ===
Takhini-Kopper King
| Party | Candidate | Votes | % | ±% |
|---|---|---|---|---|
| NDP | Kate White | 605 | 46.1% | +0.2% |
| Liberal | Jeane Lassen | 478 | 36.4% | +14.0% |
| Yukon Party | Vanessa Innes | 229 | 17.5% | -14.2% |
| Total | | 1312 | 100.0% | – |

=== 2011 general election ===
Takhini-Kopper King
| Party | Candidate | Votes | % | ±% |
|---|---|---|---|---|
| NDP | Kate White | 458 | 45.9% | – |
| Yukon Party | Samson Hartland | 316 | 31.7% | – |
| Liberal | Cherish Clarke | 224 | 22.4% | – |
| Total | | 998 | 100.0% | – |

=== 2006 general election ===
Porter Creek Centre
| Party | Candidate | Votes | % | ±% |
|---|---|---|---|---|
| Yukon Party | Archie Lang | 344 | 47.3% | -4.3% |
| Liberal | David Laxton | 224 | 30.8% | -9.5% |
| NDP | Kate White | 159 | 21.9% | +13.8% |
| Total | | 727 | 100.0% | – |
