= Todd Hardy =

Canadian politician

Member of the Yukon Legislative Assembly for Whitehorse Centre
- In office September 30, 1996 – April 17, 2000
- Preceded by: Margaret Commodore
- Succeeded by: Mike McLarnon
- In office November 4, 2002 – July 28, 2010
- Preceded by: Mike McLarnon
- Succeeded by: Liz Hanson

Leader of Official Opposition of Yukon
- In office 2002 – May 1, 2006
- Preceded by: Eric Fairclough
- Succeeded by: Arthur Mitchell

Leader of the Yukon New Democratic Party
- In office 2002 – September 26, 2009
- Preceded by: Eric Fairclough
- Succeeded by: Liz Hanson

Personal details
- Born: May 17, 1957 Murrayville, British Columbia
- Died: July 28, 2010 (aged 53) Whitehorse, Yukon, Canada
- Party: New Democrat
- Spouse: Louise Hardy
- Occupation: Carpenter, Trade Unionist

Todd Hardy (May 17, 1957 – July 28, 2010) was a Canadian carpenter, trade union activist, and politician who served as Leader of the Yukon New Democratic Party. He has also served as Leader of the Opposition in the Yukon Legislative Assembly from 2002 to 2006.

A carpenter by trade, Hardy was business agent of local 2499 of the United Brotherhood of Carpenters and Joiners of America before being elected to the Yukon Legislative Assembly. He taught karate and also volunteered as a minor hockey coach, coaching one of the Yukon's teams to the Arctic Winter Games and the Canada Winter Games. He was married to Louise Hardy, the Yukon's former federal Member of Parliament.

== Political career ==
He was first elected to the Yukon Legislative Assembly for the riding of Whitehorse Centre in the 1996 Yukon general election and was narrowly defeated in the 2000 election. Hardy was one of the founders of Habitat for Humanity in the Yukon. He became leader of the Yukon NDP in 2002 and won his Whitehorse Centre seat in the general election held that year.

In August 2006, Hardy was sent to Vancouver for leukemia treatment. Hardy fought the 2006, general election from his hospital bed through near daily telephone conferences with local reporters and the NDP candidates. He returned to Whitehorse just a week before the vote and still managed to win his seat. His party, however, though leading in the polls for months going into the election was reduced to three seats and third party status.

Hardy maintained his seat in the legislature and title of leader despite frequent trips out of the territory for continued monitoring and treatment during the spring sitting in 2007. He continued in his duties until the 2010 spring sitting, when his surprised his colleagues by sitting in the legislature despite his illness.

Citing his ongoing health issues, he announced on February 5, 2009, his intent to resign as party leader. This took effect on September 26, 2009, when Elizabeth Hanson was acclaimed as the new leader.

== Death ==
Todd Hardy died at home after a long battle with leukemia at age 53 surrounded by close family.

== Electoral record ==
=== Yukon general election, 2006 ===
Whitehorse Centre
Party	Candidate	Votes	%	±%
NDP	Todd Hardy	357	46.6%	+13.4%
Liberal	Bernie Phillips	211	27.5%	+3.4%
Yukon Party	Jerry Johnson	188	24.8%	+5.9%
Total		766	100.0%	–

=== Yukon general election, 2002 ===
Whitehorse Centre
Party	Candidate	Votes	%	±%
NDP	Todd Hardy	300	33.2%	-0.7%
Liberal	Bernie Phillips	218	24.1%	-22.1%
Independent	Mike McLarnon	207	2.9%	–
Yukon Party	Vicki Durrant	171	18.9%	+0.3%
Total		904	100.0%	–

=== Yukon general election, 2000 ===
Whitehorse Centre
Party	Candidate	Votes	%	±%
Liberal	Mike McLarnon	312	46.2%	+23.0%
NDP	Todd Hardy	229	33.9%	-11.9%
Yukon Party	Vicki Durrant	130	19.2%	-11.0%
Total		676	100.0%	–

=== Yukon general election, 1996 ===
Whitehorse Centre
Party	Candidate	Votes	%	±%
NDP	Todd Hardy	328	45.8%	+8.3%
Yukon Party	Linda Dixon	216	30.2%	-7.0%
Liberal	Jon Breen	166	23.2%	-1.7%
Total		716	100.0%	–
