= John Ostashek =

Canadian politician

4th Premier of Yukon
- In office November 7, 1992 – October 19, 1996
- Commissioner: John Kenneth McKinnon; Judy Gingell
- Preceded by: Tony Penikett
- Succeeded by: Piers McDonald

MLA for Porter Creek North
- In office October 19, 1992 – April 17, 2000
- Preceded by: first member
- Succeeded by: Don Roberts

Personal details
- Born: May 10, 1936 High Prairie, Alberta
- Died: June 10, 2007 (aged 71) Vancouver, British Columbia
- Party: Yukon Party
- Occupation: entrepreneur

John Ostashek (May 10, 1936 – June 10, 2007) was a Yukon politician. An entrepreneur, he was elected leader of the Yukon Party in June 1992 and led it to victory in the fall 1992 election in which he also won a seat in the legislature for the first time.

Ostashek declined to use the title Premier adopted by his predecessor, Tony Penikett and preferred to be called Government Leader. Ostashek's minority government, which was kept in power with the support of right leaning independent MLAs, was a conservative one which instituted welfare reform and a reduction of public services. Soon after coming into power, his government signed land claims agreements with four First Nations communities in the Yukon which had been negotiated by the previous government.

Ostashek's Yukon Party lost the 1996 election to the Yukon NDP though he retained his seat and became leader of the opposition. In the 2000 election however his Yukon Party was again defeated, this time by the Liberals with Ostashek losing his own seat. He subsequently resigned as Yukon Party leader and retired from politics.

He died on June 10, 2007, from cancer in Vancouver, after having been medevaced from Whitehorse the week before.
