= Judy Gingell =

Canadian politician (born 1946)

Commissioner of Yukon
- In office June 23, 1995 – October 1, 2000
- Prime Minister: Jean Chrétien
- Premier: John Ostashek; Piers McDonald; Pat Duncan
- Preceded by: John Kenneth McKinnon
- Succeeded by: Jack Cable

Personal details
- Born: November 26, 1946 (age 79) Moose Lake, Yukon

Coat of arms of Judy Gingell
Crest Rising out of a Yukon coronet (an antique crown Gules the rim and spikes edged Argent and garnished of bezants) an open book Argent edged Vert. Escutcheon Gules a pallet wavy Azure edged Argent between four bezants in pale on a chief dancetty Azure supported of a filet dancetty Argent a demi sun in splendour issuant Or. Supporters Upon a compartment of fireweed proper dexter a crow sinister a wolf Sable Argent and Gules the tail and hindquarters thereof charged respectively with a frog's eye Vert all of which as styled by Clifton Fred. A Tlingit copper proper decorated to include designs representing salmon, crochet hooks and a fishing hook Sable. Motto Kata Du Soothan Kwatlu (Weaving For A Better Tomorrow)

Judy Gingell, CM OY (born November 26, 1946) is an aboriginal Canadian politician, who served as the commissioner of Yukon from 1995 to 2000.

Born in Moose Lake in 1946, Gingell was the founding director of the Yukon Native Brotherhood in 1969. During the 1970s and 1980s, she served on the executive council of the Yukon Indian Women's Association and became a founding director of Northern Native Broadcasting in the Yukon. She was then elected president of the Yukon Indian Development Corporation in 1980. She was also chair of the Council for Yukon Indians from 1989 to May 1995.

She was appointed as the first aboriginal Commissioner on June 23, 1995, and retired in September 2000. She ran in the McIntyre-Takhini riding for the Yukon Liberal Party in the 2002 Yukon general election, but was not elected to the Yukon Legislative Assembly.

In 2009, she was made a Member of the Order of Canada "for her contributions, over the past four decades, to the promotion and advancement of Aboriginal rights and governance in Yukon". She was made a member of the Order of Yukon in 2019.
