= Teslin, Yukon =

Teslin Desleen
- Village
- Village of Teslin
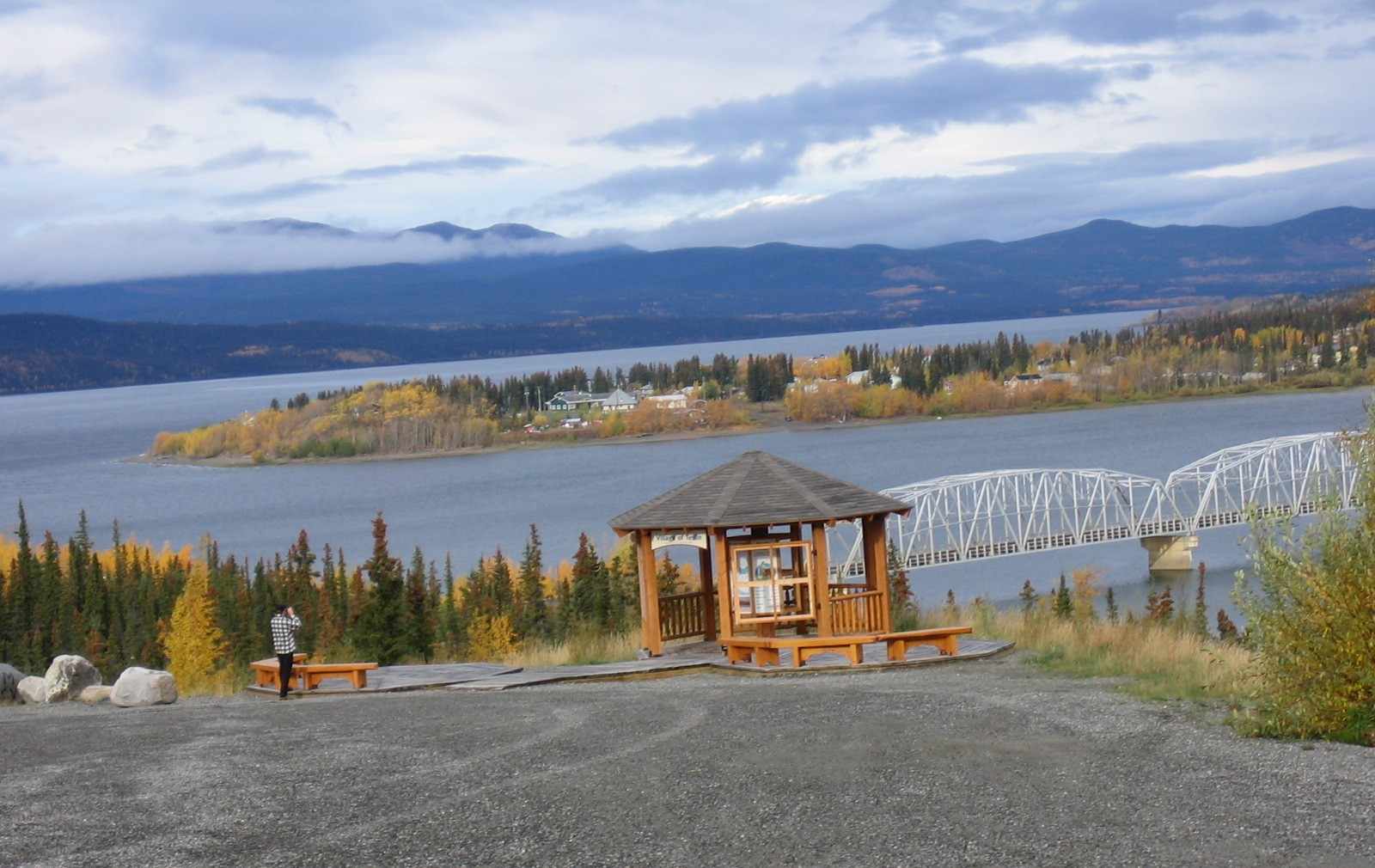
- Southeast Teslin in September 2005

- Location within Yukon Location within Canada
- Coordinates: 60°10′02″N 132°43′18″W
- Country: Canada
- Territory: Yukon
- Time zone: UTC−07:00 (MST)
- Website: www.teslin.ca

The community of Teslin (/'tɛs.lɪn/ TESS-lin) (Tlingit: Desleen) includes the Village of Teslin in Yukon, Canada. Teslin is situated at historical Mile 804 on the Alaska Highway along Teslin Lake. The Hudson's Bay Company established a small trading post at Teslin in 1903 (i.e. Teslin Post).

Teslin is home to the Teslin Inland Tlingit First Nations. The name Teslin came from a Tlingit word "Teslintoo." Teslin has one of the largest Native populations in Yukon. Much of the community's livelihood revolves around traditional hunting, trapping and fishing.

== Demographics ==
Village of Teslin

Federal census population history of Teslin
Year	Pop.	±%
1941	171	—
1951	269	+57.3%
1971	264	−1.9%
1976	241	−8.7%
1981	310	+28.6%
1986	181	−41.6%
1991	181	+0.0%
1996	189	+4.4%
2001	123	−34.9%
2006	141	+14.6%
2011	122	−13.5%
2016	124	+1.6%
2021	239	+92.7%
Source: Statistics Canada

In the 2021 Census of Population conducted by Statistics Canada, Teslin had a population of 239 living in 126 of its 144 total private dwellings, a change of −6.3% from its 2016 population of 255. With a land area of 3.77 km^{2} (1.46 sq mi), it had a population density of 63.4/km^{2} (164.2/sq mi) in 2021.

Teslin Post 13

In the 2021 Census of Population conducted by Statistics Canada, Teslin Post 13 had a population of 19 living in 10 of its 11 total private dwellings, a change of −36.7% from its 2016 population of 30. With a land area of 1.17 km^{2} (0.45 sq mi), it had a population density of 16.2/km^{2} (42.1/sq mi) in 2021.

== Arts and culture ==
Teslin is made up of two moieties; Wolf and Crow. Under the moiety of Wolf there are two clans; Eagle (Dakhl'awedi') and Wolf (Yanyedi). The Crow moiety have three clans; Raven's Children (Kukhhittan or Crow), Frog (Ishkitan) and Split tail Beaver (Deshitan). Under their matrilineal kinship system, children are considered born into the mother's clan, and descent is traced through her line.

George Johnston (trapper) (1884–1972), trapper and photographer, founder of "Teslin Taxi." He captured the life of the inland Tlingit people of Teslin and Atlin in numerous photos taken between 1910 and 1940. Johnston also brought the first car to Teslin; it was a 1928 Chevrolet. He built a 3 to 5 mi (4.8 to 8.0 km) road for his "Teslin taxi" since the Alaska Highway had not been built yet. In winter, he put chains on the car, painted it white, and drove it on frozen Teslin Lake. The '28 Chevy has been restored and is now on permanent display at the George Johnston Museum in Teslin.

== Government ==
In 1995 the Teslin Inland Tlingit negotiated and signed a land claims agreement with the federal government, under which they re-established their own government and became self-sustaining. The Teslin Inland Tlingit now enact their own legal and political framework for government-to-government relations with Canada and the Yukon.

The Teslin Tlingit Council has the right to make their own laws and regulations. There are many different departments within Teslin Tlingit Council (TTC), for example: Finance, Lands and Resources, Health and Social Development.

The people have developed the Teslin Tlingit Council Clan System Government, which combines traditional Tlingit Clan culture with contemporary organizational and management principles. The five clans (Eagle, Crow, Frog, Wolf, and Beaver) each appoint five members to the 25-member General Council, and have recognized Elders (persons 58 years and older) on the Elders Council.

== Geography ==
=== Climate ===
Teslin has a dry-summer subarctic climate (Köppen climate classification: Dsc/Dfc). Summer days are mild along with cool nights. Winters are cold and snowy, with annual snowfall averaging 148.4 cm (58.4 in). Teslin is one of the warmest communities in the Yukon, with a yearly average of −0.6 °C (30.9 °F).

Climate data for Teslin (Teslin Airport) Climate ID: 2101100; coordinates 60°10′27″N 132°44′09″W; elevation: 705 m (2,313 ft); 1981–2010 normals, extremes 1943–present
Month	Jan	Feb	Mar	Apr	May	Jun	Jul	Aug	Sep	Oct	Nov	Dec	Year
Record high humidex	8.8	10.3	12.2	19.4	28.4	35.1	33.9	32.2	26.6	17.8	10.6	8.0	35.1
Record high °C (°F)	7.8 (46.0)	11.0 (51.8)	13.0 (55.4)	22.0 (71.6)	29.0 (84.2)	33.3 (91.9)	31.1 (88.0)	32.5 (90.5)	26.1 (79.0)	18.3 (64.9)	10.0 (50.0)	9.0 (48.2)	33.3 (91.9)
Mean maximum °C (°F)	2.3 (36.1)	4.1 (39.4)	6.9 (44.4)	14.8 (58.6)	20.7 (69.3)	26.4 (79.5)	27.1 (80.8)	26.4 (79.5)	18.9 (66.0)	12.9 (55.2)	4.7 (40.5)	3.3 (37.9)	28.9 (84.0)
Mean daily maximum °C (°F)	−12.6 (9.3)	−7.7 (18.1)	−0.2 (31.6)	7.0 (44.6)	13.6 (56.5)	18.8 (65.8)	20.2 (68.4)	18.6 (65.5)	12.6 (54.7)	4.3 (39.7)	−6.2 (20.8)	−8.9 (16.0)	5.0 (41.0)
Daily mean °C (°F)	−17.1 (1.2)	−13.6 (7.5)	−6.5 (20.3)	0.7 (33.3)	6.9 (44.4)	11.9 (53.4)	14.1 (57.4)	12.2 (54.0)	7.3 (45.1)	0.4 (32.7)	−10.2 (13.6)	−13.4 (7.9)	−0.6 (30.9)
Mean daily minimum °C (°F)	−21.5 (−6.7)	−19.5 (−3.1)	−12.8 (9.0)	−5.6 (21.9)	0.1 (32.2)	4.9 (40.8)	7.9 (46.2)	5.8 (42.4)	1.9 (35.4)	−3.6 (25.5)	−14.2 (6.4)	−17.8 (0.0)	−6.2 (20.8)
Mean minimum °C (°F)	−38.8 (−37.8)	−34.6 (−30.3)	−29.0 (−20.2)	−16.6 (2.1)	−6.2 (20.8)	−1.3 (29.7)	2.4 (36.3)	−0.6 (30.9)	−5.9 (21.4)	−14.6 (5.7)	−26.8 (−16.2)	−34.1 (−29.4)	−42.5 (−44.5)
Record low °C (°F)	−52.8 (−63.0)	−50.6 (−59.1)	−41.1 (−42.0)	−27.8 (−18.0)	−23.9 (−11.0)	−4.0 (24.8)	−1.7 (28.9)	−4.0 (24.8)	−20.0 (−4.0)	−25.0 (−13.0)	−40.6 (−41.1)	−48.0 (−54.4)	−52.8 (−63.0)
Record low wind chill	−60.4	−53.4	−49.3	−31.2	−13.4	−4.2	−2.0	−5.0	−13.0	−33.2	−51.1	−59.3	−60.4
Average precipitation mm (inches)	26.5 (1.04)	16.1 (0.63)	14.2 (0.56)	9.4 (0.37)	24.0 (0.94)	30.7 (1.21)	44.2 (1.74)	41.4 (1.63)	48.7 (1.92)	38.5 (1.52)	27.4 (1.08)	25.2 (0.99)	346.3 (13.63)
Average rainfall mm (inches)	0.2 (0.01)	0.1 (0.00)	0.2 (0.01)	3.8 (0.15)	22.6 (0.89)	30.7 (1.21)	44.2 (1.74)	41.4 (1.63)	46.9 (1.85)	17.9 (0.70)	1.2 (0.05)	0.2 (0.01)	209.5 (8.25)
Average snowfall cm (inches)	29.2 (11.5)	18.3 (7.2)	14.9 (5.9)	5.9 (2.3)	1.4 (0.6)	0.0 (0.0)	0.0 (0.0)	0.0 (0.0)	1.9 (0.7)	22.0 (8.7)	27.6 (10.9)	27.0 (10.6)	148.4 (58.4)
Average precipitation days (≥ 0.2 mm)	10.8	7.9	7.4	5.2	10.3	12.2	14.8	14.8	15.8	15.0	13.9	12.2	140.5
Average rainy days (≥ 0.2 mm)	0.2	0.2	0.3	2.1	9.8	12.2	14.8	14.8	15.4	8.2	0.4	0.4	78.9
Average snowy days (≥ 0.2 cm)	10.9	7.8	7.0	3.4	0.8	0.0	0.0	0.1	1.1	8.3	13.6	11.9	65.0
Average relative humidity (%)	78.2	74.6	65.5	50.7	41.9	42.9	49.6	51.2	59.1	68.7	79.0	79.1	61.7
Source 1: Environment and Climate Change Canada Canadian Climate Normals 1981–2010, wind chill
Source 2: Météo Climat (mean maximum)(mean minimum)

== Gallery ==
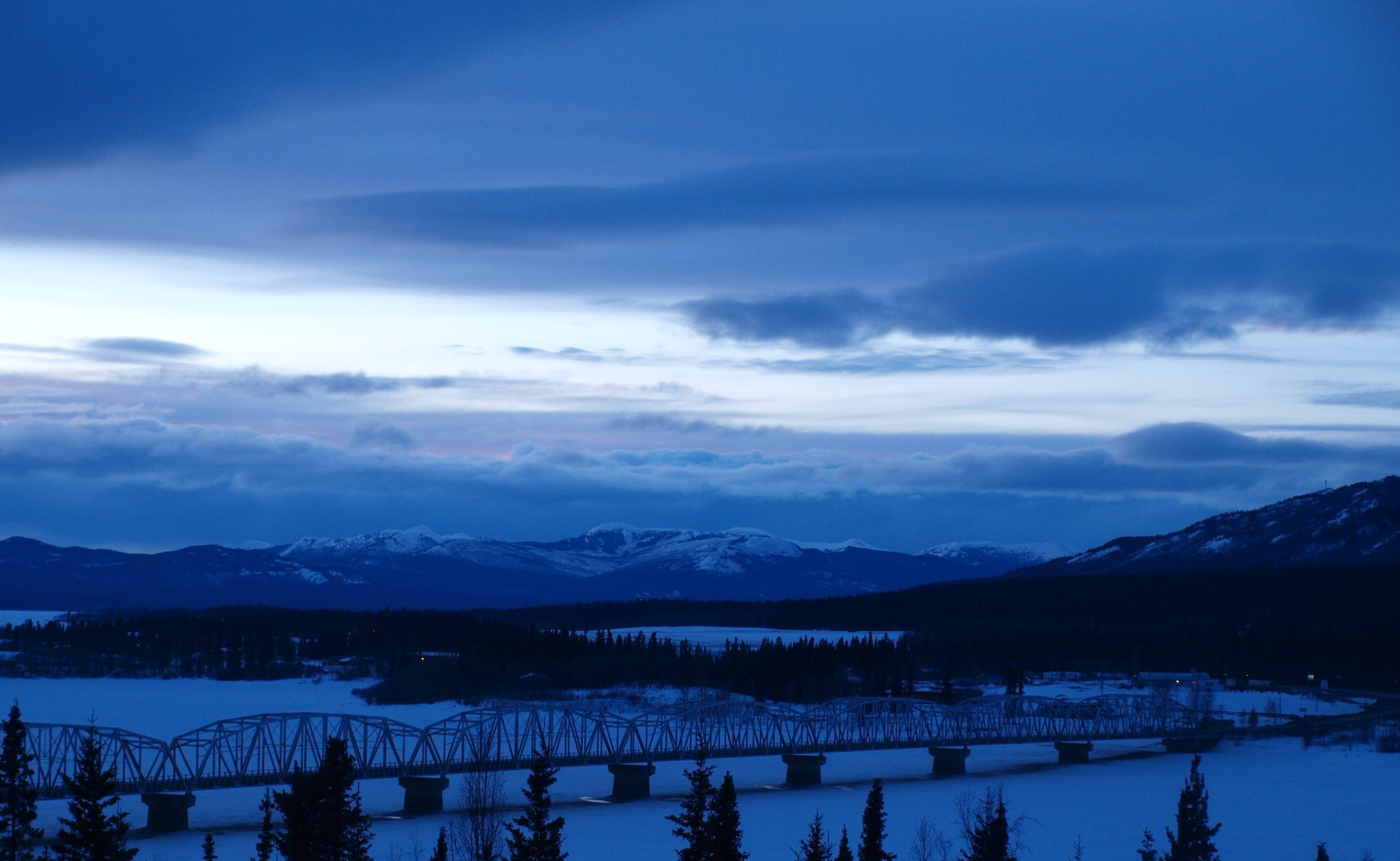
Teslin at dusk

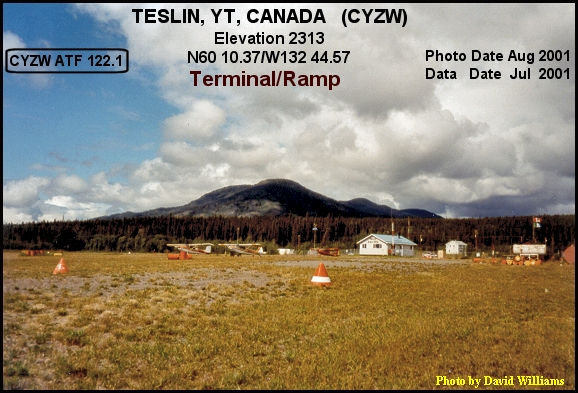
Terminal, Teslin Airport

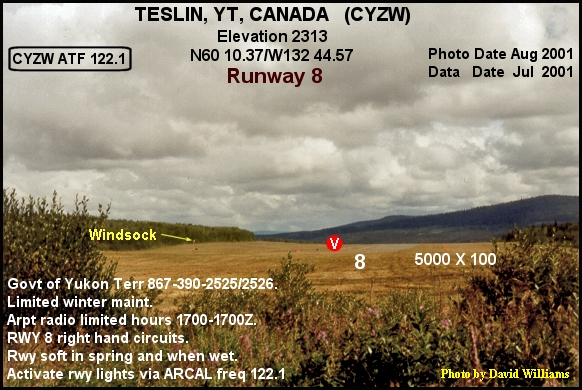
Runway 08

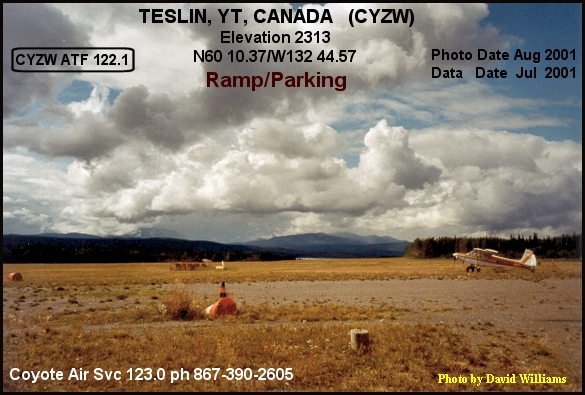
Teslin Airport

== Notable people ==
- Marian Horne (born 1943), politician (Yukon Party), elected in 2006 as MLA, Minister of Justice and Minister responsible for Women's Directorate in the Yukon Legislative Assembly
- Sam Johnston, Tlingit elder and former politician, former chancellor of Yukon College, and member of the Order of Yukon

== See also ==
- List of municipalities in Yukon
- Teslin Plateau
