= Teslin Tlingit Council =

The Teslin Tlingit Council (TTC) is a First Nation band government in the central Yukon in Canada, located in Teslin, Yukon along the Alaska Highway and Teslin Lake. The language originally spoken by the Teslin Tlingit or Deisleen Ḵwáan (″Big Sinew Tribe″) is Tlingit. Together with the Taku River Tlingit First Nation or Áa Tlein Ḵwáan (″Big Lake Tribe″) around Atlin Lake in British Columbia, and the Carcross/Tagish First Nation or Naataase Héen, they make up the Inland Tlingit.

The Teslin Tlingit Council was one of the first four Yukon First Nations to sign a land claims agreement in 1992.

== Government ==
The governmental structure of Teslin Tlingit Council (TTC) incorporates traditional Teslin Tlingit Clan culture into contemporary organizational and management principles.

TTC is both representative of the Clans and its Citizens and responsible—two characteristics it has in common with other democratic governments. The distinguishing feature of responsible government is the close relations between the executive and legislative branches. To this effect, the Executive Council, who initiates policy and watches over the enforcement of the law, works in harmony with the General Council, who enacts laws and charts the overall political course. Delegation Of Authority

TTC is structured based on the principle of delegation of authority to effectively and efficiently administer the separation of powers through its various governing bodies, departments, boards and committees, trusts, and special operating agencies. Accountable Governance

TTC firmly believes in the principle of ensuring accountability, the key expressions of which are disclosure, transparency and redress.

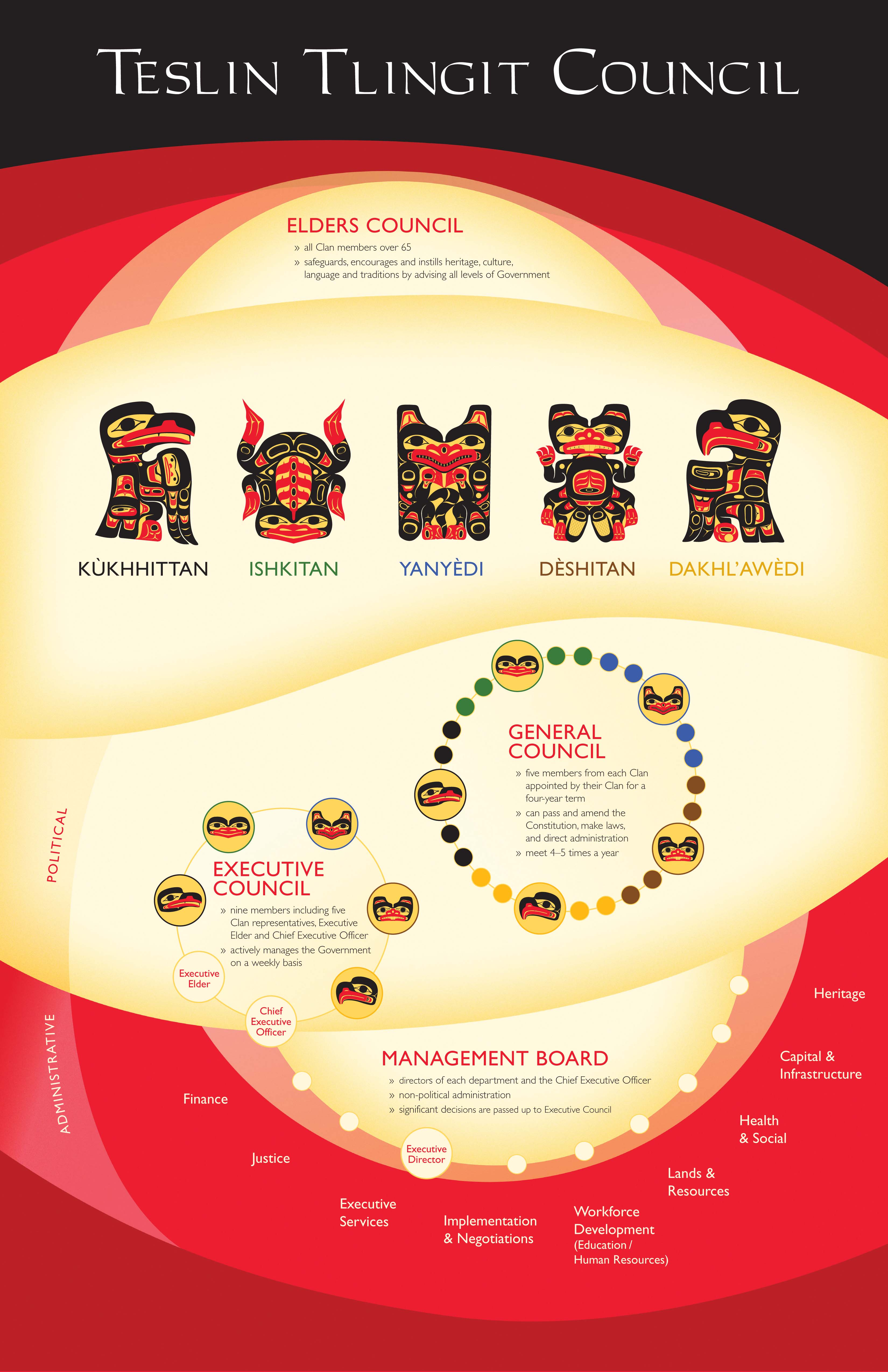
Government structure of the Teslin Tlingit Council

=== Clan-Based Governance ===
The structure of Teslin Tlingit Council (TTC) incorporates traditional Teslin Tlingit Clan culture into contemporary organizational and management principles. Representation by the five Teslin Tlingit Clans – Kukhhittan, Ishkitan, Yanyedi, Deshitan, and Dakhlawedi – is central to TTC government structure. A member of each Clan sits on the Executive Council, and five representatives appointed by each Clan form the 25-member General Council.

Under TTC's Constitution, Clan membership and organization is determined by the customs inherited and observed by the Clan and acknowledged by the other Clans. Each Clan has a Leader and Elders recognized as such by the Clan.

=== Executive Council ===
The nine-member Executive Council is composed of the chief executive officer, Deputy Chief, Youth Councillor, one representative from each of the five Clans, and one Elder appointed by the Elders Council. Other than the Executive Elder, all members of Executive Council are appointed for four-year terms by General Council.

Executive Council meets regularly throughout the year, and oversees the laws and policies as approved by General Council as well as executes other authorities as delegated by General Council. Executive Council provides the link between the legislative branch (General Council) and the administrative branch (Management Board and the Departments) of Teslin Tlingit Council (TTC). The Chief Executive Officer, in conjunction with the other Executive Councillors, is responsible for the political direction of TTC.

=== General Council ===
The General Council is the legislative branch of Teslin Tlingit Council (TTC), consisting of 25 members. There are five representatives from each Clan – Kùkhhittàn, Ishkìtàn, Yanyèdí, Dèshitàn, and Dakhl’awèdí – appointed for four-year terms by their respective Clans

General Council is the government authority which acts on behalf of and for Teslin Tlingit Citizens, and which all TTC governing bodies report to and get direction from. In practice, General Council is a forum where members bring forward government business for discussion, debate and deliberation, and pass legislation typically through consensual agreement. It is the ultimate political decision-making body of TTC, with the exclusive power to make and rule on law, amend the Constitution, approve the Annual Budget, and appoint Clan representatives for the Executive Council.

General Council meets twice in March with the main task of passing the year's budget, once in the summer for the Annual General Assembly, and once in November. Additional meetings are arranged as needed to deal with specific issues. The Executive Council joins the General Council for meetings, and management board will generally attend to provide background information on issues of deliberation. The sessions are open to Citizens and community members.

=== Elders Council ===
The Elders Council is composed of all Teslin Tlingit Elders aged 55 years or older, as stated in the Teslin Tlingit Council (TTC) Constitution (Section 15.1). Elders have a lifetime appointment to the Elders Council

The Elders Council gives advice and direction to all other TTC government branches and is responsible for safe-guarding, encouraging and instilling Teslin Tlingit heritage, culture, language and other traditions.

=== Chief Executive Officer ===
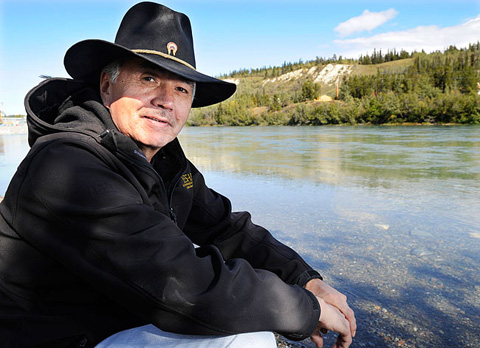
Carl Sidney - CEO of the Teslin Tlingit Council (2012-)

Khixhi ka Yelth (Carl Sidney) was born and raised in Teslin, Yukon. He is a member of the Kukkhittan (Raven Child) Clan, one of the five Clans of the Teslin Tlingit First Nation. Brought up traditionally by his Grandmother, Yes-ketch (Olive Sidney), he learnt from a young age how to live off the land.

On ratification of TTC's Self-Government Agreement (one of the first in all of Canada), Carl continued to represent his Clan, sitting as Kukkhittan Executive Councillor in the newly established TTC Government. Carl served a total of 10 years on the Executive Council, seven as TTC's Deputy-Chief.

At the TTC's 2012 Annual General Assembly, held on Teslin Tlingit's Traditional Territory at Brooks Brook, Carl was appointed by the TTC General Council to serve as TTC's Chief for the 2012–16 term.

=== Past chiefs ===
- Sam Johnston (1970 - 1984)
- Robert Lee Jackson (1984)
- Richard Sidney (1984 - 1986)
- Robert Lee Jackson (1986 - 1988)
- Dave Keenan (1988 - 1996)
- Richard Sidney (1996 - 2000)
- Eric Morris (2000 - 2008) on leave 2005/6
- Peter Johnston (2008 - 2012) interim 2005/6
- Carl Sidney (2012 - 2016)
- Richard Sidney (2016 - 2020)

Honorable mention to more past Chiefs including:

- Frank Sidney
- Joe Squam
- William Johnston

== Self-government ==
Signed in 1993, TTC's Self-Government Agreement enables TTC to found the legal and political framework for facilitating its government-to-government relations with Canada and Yukon.

To this end, the agreement sets out a comprehensive list of subject matters under which TTC assumes law-making authority, and among which TTC is entitled to enact its own laws in the following areas.

- The use, management and good governance of its Settlement Lands and the people living on these lands.
- The administration, operation and internal management of TTC affairs, including the rights and benefits realized pursuant to the TTC Final Agreement.

The legislative powers of TTC apply to TTC Citizens wherever they may reside in the Yukon.

The Self-Government Agreement means that TTC will become increasingly responsible in areas that were previously administered by the governments of Canada or Yukon. Pursuant to the agreement, TTC has the ability to negotiate the devolution of responsibility for the design, administration and delivery of programs and services for which Canada will provide funds through the Financial and Programs Service Transfer Agreements.

== Self-justice ==
The Administration of Justice Agreement (AJA) recognizes Teslin Tlingit Council's jurisdiction to administer justice. Signed by representatives of the Government of Canada, Government of Yukon and TTC on February 21, 2011, it is the first agreement of this sort to come into effect in Canada; putting TTC at the forefront of autonomous aboriginal governance in the nation.

The AJA means that certain areas in the administration of justice will be based on traditional Teslin Tlingit processes for resolving disputes. The agreement affords TTC with the power to

- impose penalties for violations of TTC laws;
- appoint individuals to enforce and prosecute violations of these laws; and,
- establish a Peacemaker Court to adjudicate violations and to reconsider decisions made by TTC government officials or administrative bodies.

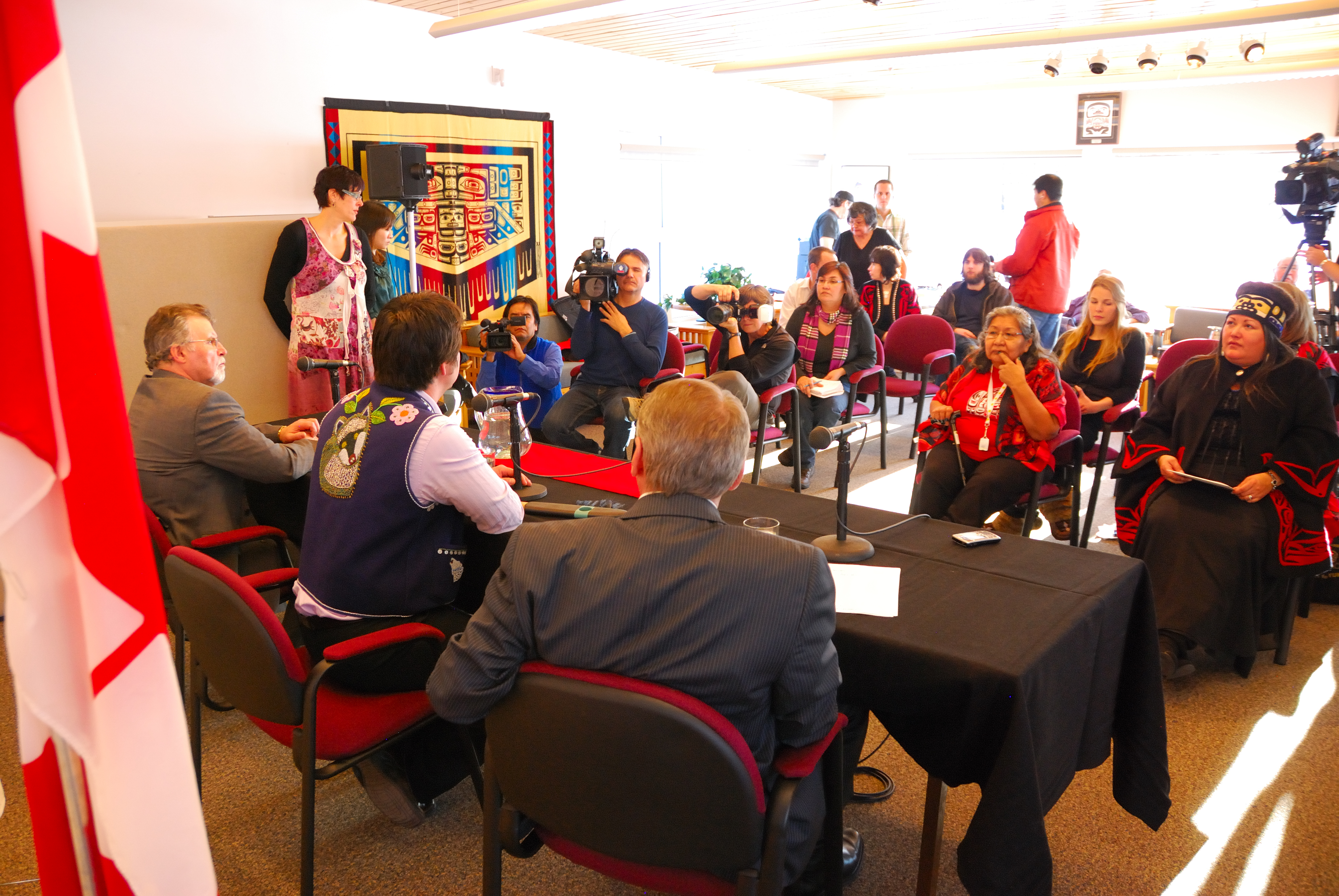
TTC Administration of Justice Press Conference. Then Chief of TTC Peter Johnston, with past Yukon Premier Dennis Fentie and Canadian Federal Minister for Indian and Northern Affairs, John Duncan at the Teslin Tlingit Heritage Centre, Teslin, Yukon.

On November 24, 2011, the implementation of the Administration of Justice Agreement began with the enactment of the Peacemaker Court and Justice Council Act . TTC's Justice Council plays a large role in implementing the Administration of Justice Agreement, including the appointment of Peacemakers to conduct court proceedings

== Government administration (departments) ==
The Teslin Tlingit Council's administration is divided into 9 departments:

- Executive Services - responsible for internal organization, political research, policy and legislation development and communications.
- Finance and Administration - financial management, citizenship/records registration and I.T
- Health & Social Development - promotes community wellness, provide support services and manages early learning/child care service
- Lands & Resources - responsible for the management and protection of wildlife and resources on the Teslin Tlingit Traditional Territory
- Capital & Infrastructure - maintains and develops TTC's building stock and infrastructure
- Heritage - manages the Teslin Tlingit Heritage Centre, maintains sites of heritage significance, delivers bi-annual cultural celebrations and promotes Tlingit culture and language use.
- Negotiations & Implementation - responsible for the continuing negotiation and implementation of TTC's treaties and agreements at the Territorial and Federal levels.
- Justice - implements and manages TTC's Administration of Justice Agreement including the training of Peacemakers and coordinating the activities of the Peacemaker Court
- Workforce Development - engages in community development through a range of education support services and training. Administers TTC's Human Resources.

== Teslin Tlingit heritage ==
Teslin Tlingit people are Inland Tlingit, who journeyed from the coast of southeast Alaska to the interior plains of the Yukon in the early 18th Century. Until the formation of permanent settlements with the construction of the Alaska Highway in 1942, Teslin Tlingit people practiced a semi-nomadic subsistence life of fishing, hunting, and gathering. Hunting and gathering continue to play a large role in Teslin Tlingit culture, and today Elders pass on traditional knowledge to Tlingit youth through harvest camps.

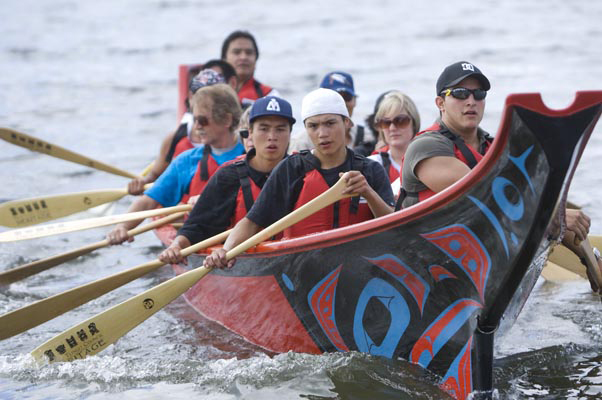
Traditional Tlingit canoe being raced during events at the 2009 Ha Kus Teyea Celebration, Teslin Lake, Teslin, Yukon

=== Citizenship ===
Teslin Tlingit Council (TTC) Citizenship is based on blood lineage and traditional custom, and does not follow the Federal Government's definition of ‘Status’. At present, there are approximately 800 Citizens, 300 of which live in the Village of Teslin, 300 in Whitehorse, and 200 elsewhere in North America.

=== Tlingit Language ===
The Tlingit language is distantly related to Eyak, an extinct language from the Alaskan coast. Today, Tlingit is spoken in the Yukon communities of Teslin and Carcross, in the Atlin area of British Columbia, and in coastal settlements stretching along the Alaskan panhandle from Yakutat to Ketchikan. Given the geographic range of the language, there is relatively little dialect diversity and all speakers can generally understand each other.

Through the Heritage Department, TTC offers Tlingit language and culture programs which foster language learning in Teslin Tlingit youth, set up mentorship arrangements for advanced learners, and present opportunities for the sharing of Tlingit language skills within traditional contexts.

=== Ha Kus Teyea Celebration ===
Every odd year in the summer, the Ha Kus Teyea Celebration is hosted at the Teslin Tlingit Heritage Centre by the Inland Tlingit nations, Teslin Tlingit Council, Carcross/Tagish First Nation and Taku River Tlingit First Nation. Members of Tlingit nations in Juneau, Angoon, Sitka and elsewhere journey to Teslin for this celebration, which reconnects Inland and Coastal Tlingit people.

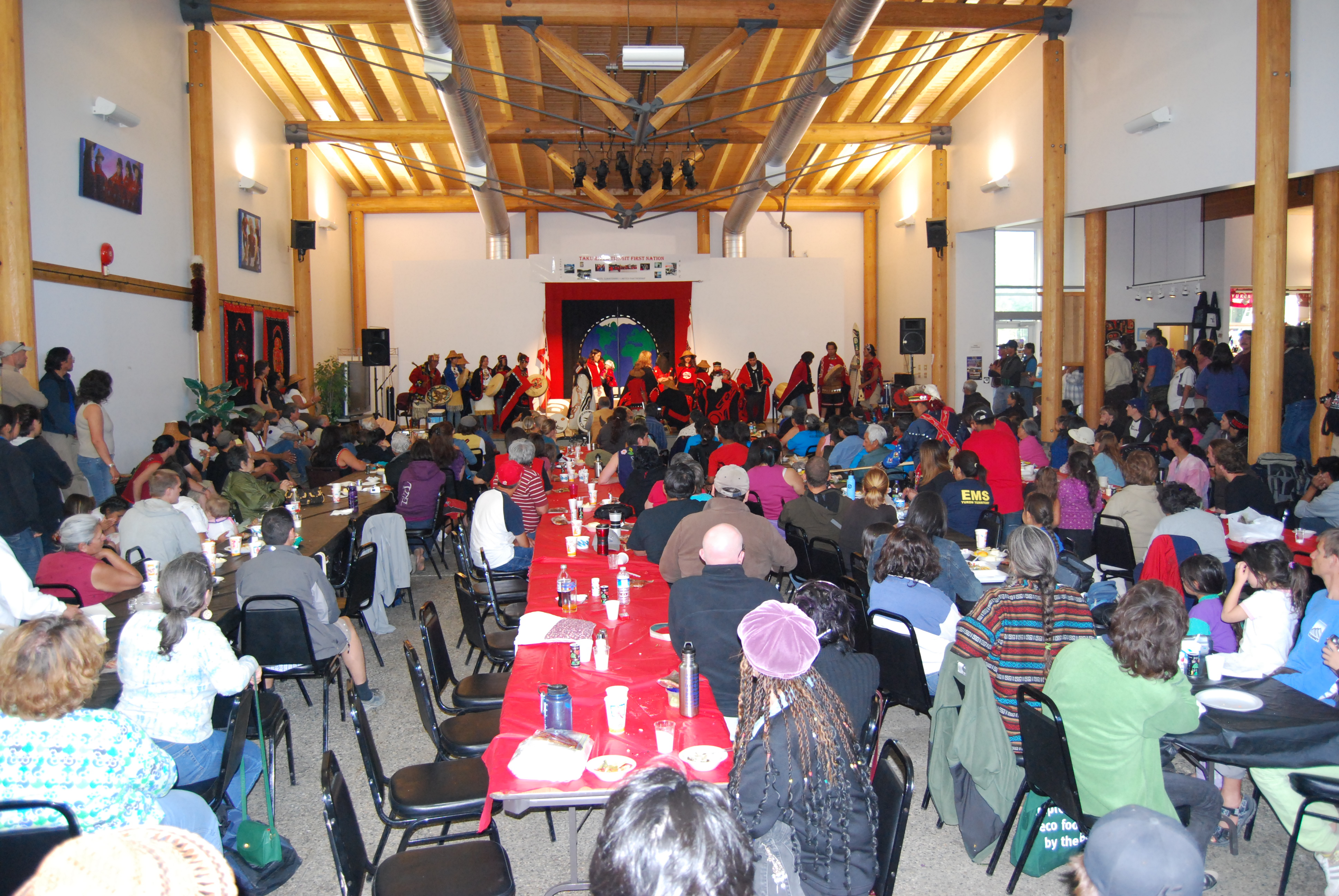
2009 Ha Kus Teyea Celebration of Tlingit Culture, Teslin Tlingit Heritage Centre, Teslin, Yukon.

Ha Kus Teyea – ‘Our Way’ – is what defines the Teslin Tlingit. It is the collective and shared understanding of who they are: their knowledge, language, art, history and relationship to their environment.

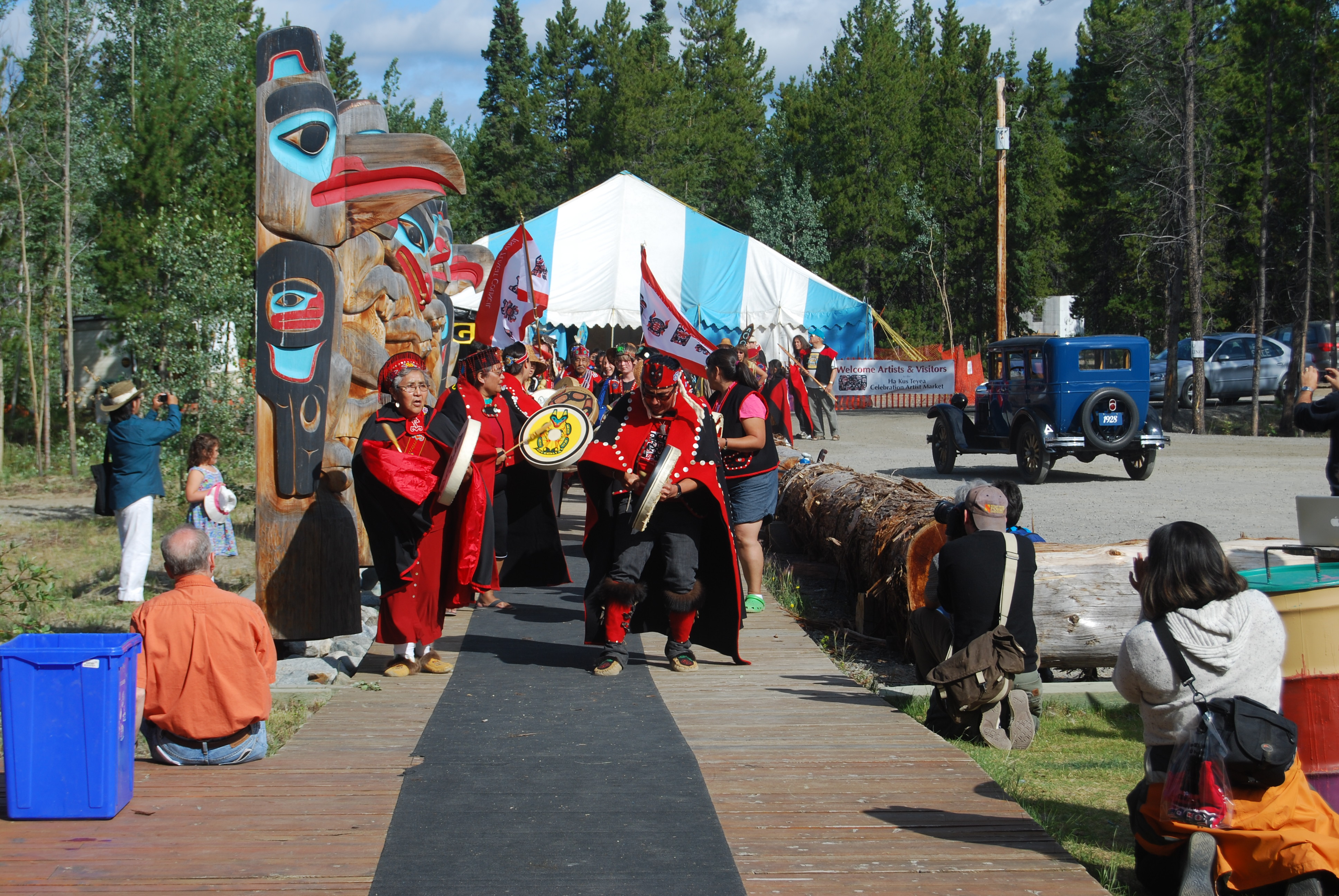
Traditional dancing at the Teslin Tlingit Heritage Centre, Teslin, Yukon.

Teslin Tlingit culture formed through a history of movement from the coast to the interior. The coastal Tlingit culture of southeast Alaska was brought inland some three hundred years ago. Although the Inland Tlingit integrated with their Athapaskan neighbours, Tlingit traditions, culture and social patterns remained strong, and are alive today. Today, Inland Tlingit and Coastal Tlingit people share in the celebration of Tlingit culture through the Ha Kus Teyea Celebration.

== Indian reserves ==
Indian Reserves administered by the Teslin Tlingit Council are:

- Nisutlin Indian Reserve No. 14, 83.90 ha. 60°13′00″N 132°34′00″W
- Nisutlin Bay Indian Reserve No. 15, 0.5 km SE of Teslin, 50 ha. 60°12′25″N 132°34′13″W
- Teslin Post Indian Reserve No. 13, 27.60 ha.60°10′00″N 132°40′00″W
