= Alberta Highway 630 =

Highway in Alberta

Wye Road
- Highway 630
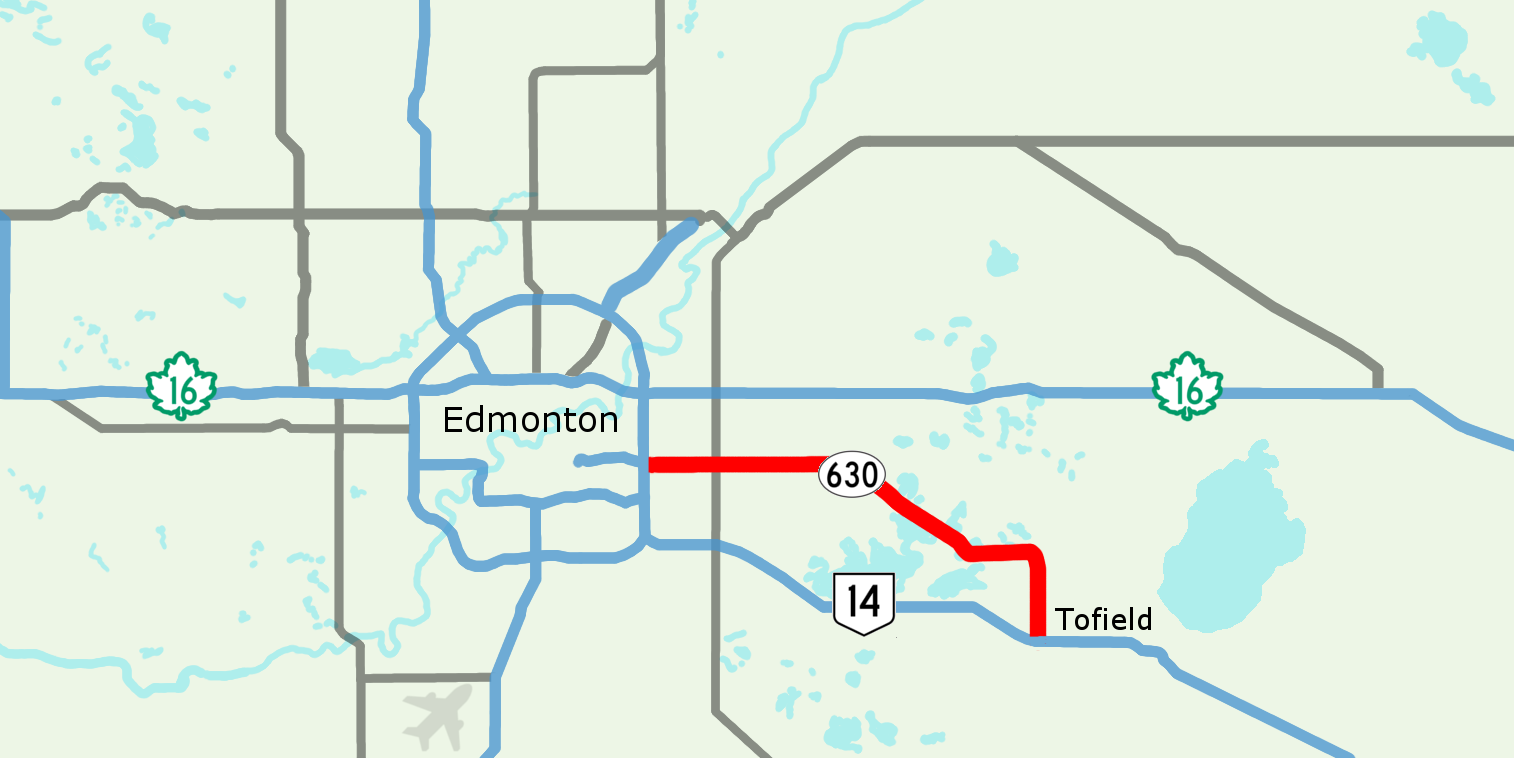
- Highway 630 highlighted in red

Route information
- Maintained by Alberta Transportation
- Length: 39.9 km (24.8 mi)

Major junctions
- West end: Highway 216 near Sherwood Park
- Highway 21 in Sherwood Park
- South end: Highway 14 near Tofield

Location
- Country: Canada
- Province: Alberta
- Specialized and rural municipalities: Strathcona County, Beaver County
- Major cities: Sherwood Park

Highway system
- Alberta Numbered Highway Network; List; Former
← Highway 629	→ Highway 631

Wye Road is a major arterial road and rural highway that links Sherwood Park from Anthony Henday Drive (Highway 216) on the east side of Edmonton to Highway 14 west of Tofield. It is preceded by Sherwood Park Freeway, and east of Highway 21 is designated as Alberta Provincial Highway No. 630, commonly referred to as Highway 630. Wye Road is part of a 40-kilometre-long (25 mi) continuous roadway that runs through Sherwood Park, Edmonton, and St. Albert that includes Sherwood Park Freeway, Whyte Avenue, portions of University Avenue and Saskatchewan Drive, Groat Road, and St. Albert Trail.

Wye Road in Strathcona County, is a historic route from the early 1900s connecting Edmonton to Cooking Lake, parallel to a line of the Canadian National Railway, and it and Highway 630 used to be synonymous for their entire length. In the early 1990s, the portion of Highway 630 east of North Cooking Lake was realigned, resulting in Highway 630 entering Beaver County and passing through Lindbrook and subsequently paved, while the original gravel route is still designated as Wye Road and links with Highway 14 near Hastings Lake. The portion of Wye Road within Sherwood Park is maintained by Strathcona County and is not officially part of Highway 630.

== Major intersections ==
Starting from the west end of Wye Road:

Rural/specialized municipality	Location	km	mi	Destinations	Notes
Strathcona County	Sherwood Park	−7.1– −5.7	−4.4– −3.5	Sherwood Park Freeway west – Edmonton Anthony Henday Drive (Highway 216)	Interchange; Highway 216 exit 61; Wye Road western terminus; continues as Sherwood Park Freeway
Strathcona County	Sherwood Park	−4.9	−3.0	Sherwood Drive, Range Road 233	
Strathcona County	Sherwood Park	−3.2	−2.0	Brentwood Boulevard, Range Road 232	
Strathcona County	Sherwood Park	−1.6	−0.99	Clover Bar Road, Range Road 231	
Strathcona County	Sherwood Park	0.0	0.0	Highway 21 – Fort Saskatchewan, Camrose	Highway 630 western terminus
Strathcona County		6.6	4.1	Highway 824 – Ardrossan, South Cooking Lake	
Strathcona County		11.4	7.1	Highway 830 – Josephburg, Half Moon Lake	
Strathcona County	North Cooking Lake	21.2	13.2	Range Road 210	
Strathcona County		26.4	16.4	Wye Road (Township Road 514A)	Wye Road leaves Highway 630
Beaver County	Lindbrook	36.9	22.9	Township Road 512	
Beaver County		39.9	24.8	Highway 14 – Tofield, Wainwright, Edmonton Highway 833 south – Camrose	Highway 630 eastern terminus; continues as Highway 833
1.000 mi = 1.609 km; 1.000 km = 0.621 mi: Route transition

== See also ==
- Transportation in Edmonton
