= Collingwood Cove =

- Hamlet
- Location of Collingwood Cove in Alberta
- Coordinates: 53°26′N 113°0′W
- Country: Canada
- Province: Alberta
- Region: Edmonton Region
- Census division: 11
- Specialized municipality: Strathcona County
- Settled: 1950

Government
  - Type: Unincorporated
  - Mayor: Rod Frank
  - Governing body: Strathcona County Council: Dave Anderson; Katie Berghofer; Brian Botterill; Linton Delainey; Glen Lawrence; Robert Parks; Paul Smith; Bill Tonita

Area (2021)
  - Land: 2.52 km^{2} (0.97 sq mi)
- Elevation: 740 m (2,430 ft)

Population (2021)
  - Total: 377
  - Density: 149.6/km^{2} (387/sq mi)
- Time zone: UTC−06:00 (Alberta Time)
- Postal code span: T8G
- Area code: +1-780
- Website: Strathcona County

Collingwood Cove is a hamlet in Alberta, Canada within Strathcona County. It is located at the terminus of Highway 629, approximately 17 kilometres (11 mi) southeast of Sherwood Park.

Commonly referred to as The Cove, Collingwood Cove started growing in the early 1950s as a popular summer lakeside resort. It was popular due to its proximity to Edmonton and its location on Cooking Lake, which was, at that time, one of the best lakes for recreational activities in the region.

Since 1990, there have been several new developments in the hamlet, such as new homes, a modern playground with basketball hoops and a seasonal ice surface. There has also been an active community association that hosts Canada Day celebrations, sleigh rides, skating parties and regular nature walks for the children.

== Demographics ==
The population of Collingwood Cove according to the 2024 municipal census conducted by Strathcona County is 371, a −1.1% change from its 2022 municipal census population count of 375.

In the 2021 Census of Population conducted by Statistics Canada, Collingwood Cove had a population of 377 living in 143 of its 148 total private dwellings, a change of 3.9% from its 2016 population of 363. With a land area of 2.52 km^{2} (0.97 sq mi), it had a population density of 149.6/km^{2} (387.5/sq mi) in 2021.

As a designated place in the 2016 Census of Population conducted by Statistics Canada, Collingwood Cove had a population of 363 living in 137 of its 142 total private dwellings, a change of 9.7% from its 2011 population of 331. With a land area of 2.51 km^{2} (0.97 sq mi), it had a population density of 144.6/km^{2} (374.6/sq mi) in 2016.

== See also ==
- List of communities in Alberta
- List of designated places in Alberta
- List of hamlets in Alberta
