= Antler Lake =

- Hamlet
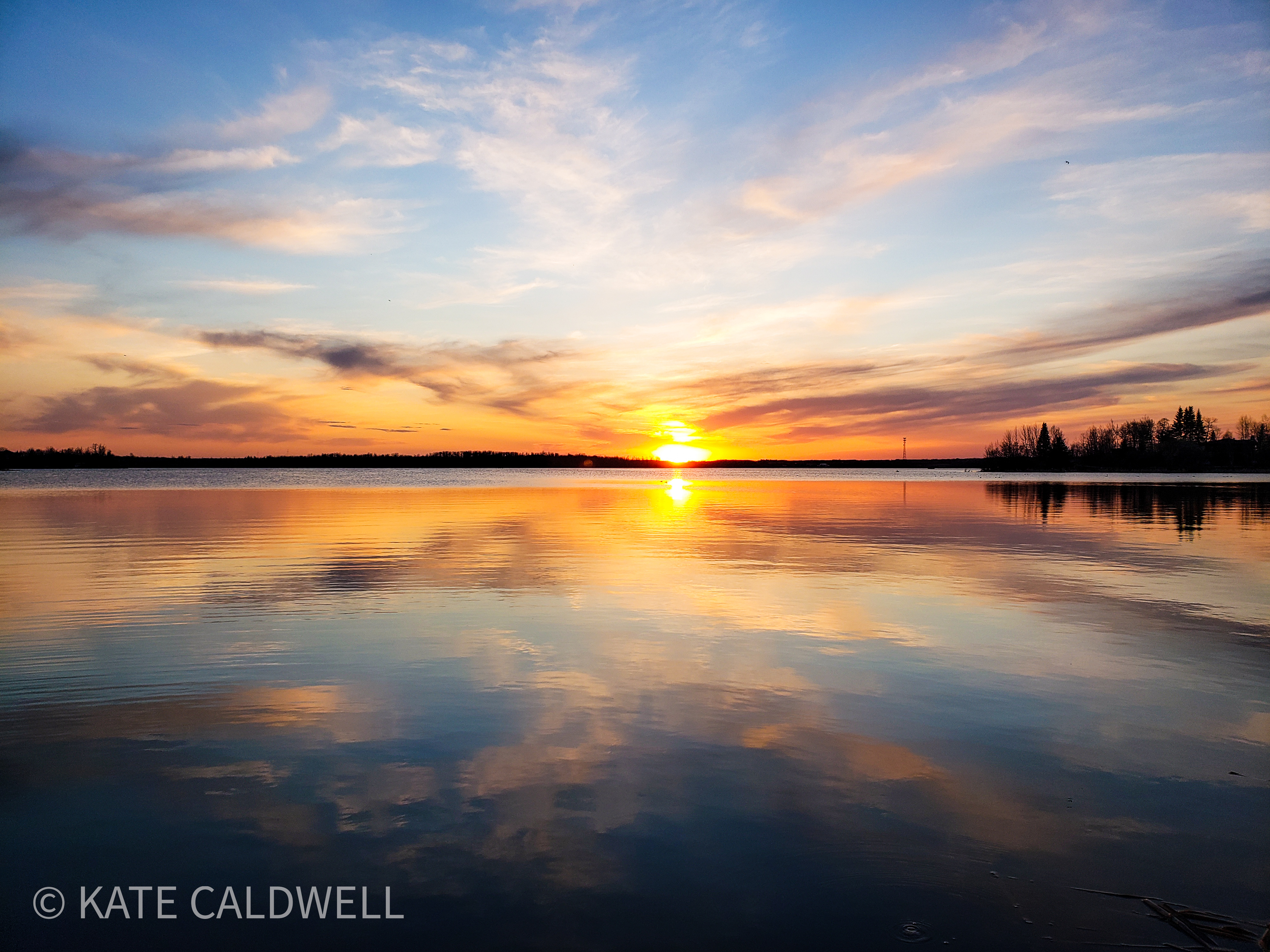
- Sunset On Antler Lake

- Location of Antler Lake in Alberta
- Coordinates: 53°29′20″N 112°58′29″W
- Country: Canada
- Province: Alberta
- Region: Edmonton Region
- Census division: 11
- Specialized municipality: Strathcona County
- Settled: 1975

Government
  - Type: Unincorporated
  - Mayor: Rod Frank
  - Governing body: Strathcona County Council: Dave Anderson; Katie Berghofer; Brian Botterill; Linton Delainey; Glen Lawrence; Robert Parks; Paul Smith; Bill Tonita

Area (2021)
  - Land: 0.77 km^{2} (0.30 sq mi)
- Elevation: 739 m (2,425 ft)

Population (2021)
  - Total: 412
  - Density: 536.2/km^{2} (1,389/sq mi)
- Time zone: UTC−06:00 (Alberta Time)
- Area code: +1-780
- Highways: Highway 630
- Website: Strathcona County

Antler Lake is a hamlet in Alberta, Canada within Strathcona County. It is located on the shores of Antler Lake on Range Road 211 and 211A just north of Wye Road, approximately 18 km (11 mi) east of Sherwood Park and 25 km (16 mi) northwest of Tofield.

Antler Lake consists of residences developed on the eastern and southern shores of the lake, with some also developed on Hazelnut Island. It also has two playgrounds and access to outdoor recreation opportunities in the surrounding area.

The hamlet is near the Strathcona Wilderness Centre, Cooking Lake - Blackfoot Grazing, Wildlife and Provincial Recreation Area, and the Elk Island National Park of Canada. Antler Lake is also situated within 5 km (3.1 mi) of the Uncas Elementary School, which many of the local children attend.

== Demographics ==
Population history of Antler Lake
Year	Pop.	±%
1981	334	—
1991	340	+1.8%
2006A	431	+26.8%
2011R	454	+5.3%
2016	442	−2.6%
2016R	457	+3.4%
2021	412	−9.8%
Source: Statistics Canada

The population of Antler Lake according to the 2024 municipal census conducted by Strathcona County is 439, a 2.6% change from its 2022 municipal census population count of 428.

In the 2021 Census of Population conducted by Statistics Canada, Antler Lake had a population of 412 living in 172 of its 185 total private dwellings, a change of −9.8% from its 2016 population of 457. With a land area of 0.77 km^{2} (0.30 sq mi), it had a population density of 535.1/km^{2} (1,385.8/sq mi) in 2021.

As a designated place in the 2016 Census of Population conducted by Statistics Canada, Antler Lake had a population of 442 living in 180 of its 193 total private dwellings, a change of −2.6% from its 2011 population of 454. With a land area of 0.89 km^{2} (0.34 sq mi), it had a population density of 496.6/km^{2} (1,286.3/sq mi) in 2016.

== See also ==
- List of communities in Alberta
- List of designated places in Alberta
- List of hamlets in Alberta
