= Alberta Highway 14 =

Highway in Alberta

Highway 14
- Poundmaker Trail
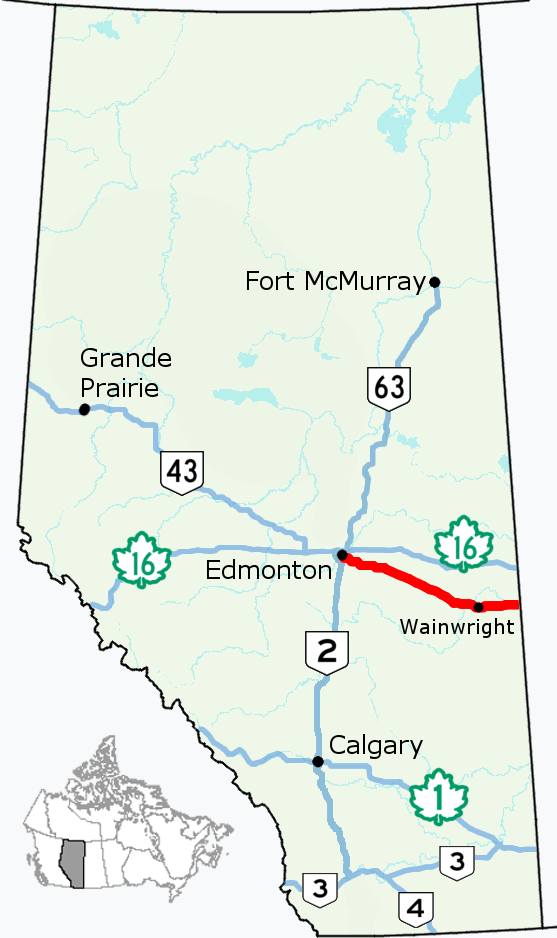
- Highway 14 highlighted in red

Route information
- Maintained by the Ministry of Transportation and Economic Corridors
- Length: 245.1 km (152.3 mi)

Major junctions
- West end: Highway 216 in Edmonton
- Highway 21 near Sherwood Park; Highway 36 in Viking; Highway 26 near Kinsella; Highway 41 in Wainwright; Highway 17 near the Saskatchewan border
- East end: Highway 40 at the Saskatchewan border

Location
- Country: Canada
- Province: Alberta
- Specialized and rural municipalities: Strathcona County, Beaver County, Wainwright No. 61 M.D.
- Major cities: Edmonton
- Towns: Tofield, Viking, Wainwright
- Villages: Ryley, Holden, Irma

Highway system
- Alberta Numbered Highway Network; List; Former
← Highway 13	→ Highway 15

Highway 14 is an east–west highway in central Alberta, Canada. It stretches from Edmonton through Wainwright to the Alberta–Saskatchewan border, running parallel to the more northern Highway 16. Highway 14 is about 245 kilometres (152 mi) long.

Along with Saskatchewan Highway 40 (with which it connects at the boundary), it forms part of the Poundmaker Trail, a designation running from Edmonton to North Battleford, Saskatchewan, across both provinces. The trail is named after Pitikwahanapiwiyin (c. 1842–1886), known in English as Poundmaker, a Plains Cree chief who participated in Treaty 6 negotiations in 1876 and became known for his peacekeeping role during the North-West Resistance of 1885. Tried for treason and imprisoned for a year after the resistance, he was formally exonerated by the federal government in 2019.

== Route description ==
Highway 14 officially begins at the southeastern extremity of Edmonton at Anthony Henday Drive (Highway 216), Edmonton's ring road, near the locality of Bretona. The highway travels east as a divided highway and intersects Highway 21 before the divided highway ends west of South Cooking Lake. It continues east toward Tofield where it bends southeast, paralleling the main line of the Canadian National Railway, and passes through Ryley, Poe, Holden, and Bruce before intersecting Highway 36 (Veterans Memorial Highway) in Viking. Natural gas was discovered near Viking in November 1914, and the Viking gas field has remained part of the regional economy for over a century.

The highway continues through Kinsella and Irma, then crosses the Battle River near Fabyan. The nearby Fabyan Trestle Bridge, a CN Railway bridge completed in 1908, spans 2,775 feet (846 m) across the Battle River valley at a height of 195 feet (59 m). The highway then enters Wainwright and crosses Highway 41 (Buffalo Trail). Wainwright's economy rests on agriculture, oil and gas production (active since 1921), and the military. Canadian Forces Base Wainwright, adjacent to the town, serves as the headquarters for army training in western Canada. The route then travels due east and intersects Highway 17 to enter Saskatchewan.

== History ==
Highway 14 historically began at Highway 2 in Old Strathcona at the intersection of 104 Street and Whyte (82) Avenue, following Whyte Avenue and 79 Avenue out of Edmonton, until it was realigned to the newly constructed Sherwood Park Freeway in 1968. Just west of Sherwood Park, at the Highway 14X junction, Highway 14 travelled south for 6 kilometres (4 mi) along present-day Anthony Henday Drive before turning east. In the 1980s, Highway 14 was rerouted to follow Whitemud Drive within Edmonton; however, it followed 50 Street and Sherwood Park Freeway as at the time Whitemud Drive terminated at 34 Street. In 1999, Whitemud Drive was extended east to Highway 14 (present-day Anthony Henday Drive), resulting in Highway 14 being rerouted away from the Sherwood Park Freeway, with the 3.4-kilometre (2.1 mi) section north of Whitemud Drive and Highway 14X becoming Highway 216.

In 2007 the southeast portion of Anthony Henday Drive was completed, while Highway 14 remained designated on Whitemud Drive as a city-maintained roadway, despite signage at Bretona indicating that Highway 14 ended at Anthony Henday Drive. In 2016, the northeastern portion of Anthony Henday Drive was completed; part of the project was rebuilding the section between Whitemud Drive and Yellowhead Trail and the Highway 14 signage was removed at the Whitemud Drive interchange. In subsequent years the official Highway 14 designation has been removed from Whitemud Drive; however, some eastbound trailblazer signage remains.

== Construction and improvements ==
Alberta Transportation's 2023 and 2024 provincial construction programs both listed five resurfacing projects on Highway 14, all designated as economic corridor improvements supporting oversize and overweight vehicle movement. All five segments were in design in both years.

The planned resurfacing covered a 35 km selective segment between Highway 216 and Highway 21, 13 km between 4 km east of Highway 883 and Highway 41, 15 km between Highway 41 and Highway 610, 17 km between Highway 610 and 1 km east of Highway 897, and 24 km between 1 km east of Highway 897 and 1 km east of Highway 17 near the Saskatchewan border.

== Major intersections ==
From west to east:

Rural/specialized municipality	Location	km	mi	Destinations	Notes
City of Edmonton		−11.9– −11.3	−7.4– −7.0	Whitemud Drive west (Highway 2 north) Calgary Trail south (Highway 2 south) / Gateway Boulevard north – Airport, Red Deer, Calgary	Interchange; former Highway 14 western terminus and formerly followed Whitemud Drive
City of Edmonton		See Whitemud Drive (km 17.9 – 28.2)			
Strathcona County		−1.6	−0.99	Highway 628 east (Township Road 522) Anthony Henday Drive (Highway 216 north)	Interchange (Highway 216 exit 64); Highway 14 formerly followed Highway 216 south; Highway 14 originally followed Highway 216 north to Sherwood Park Freeway
Strathcona County	Bretona	0.0– 3.6	0.0– 2.2	Anthony Henday Drive (Highway 216 west)	Bretona Interchange; Highway 216 exit 66; Highway 14 western terminus
Strathcona County		8.2	5.1	Highway 21 – Sherwood Park, Fort Saskatchewan, Camrose	Interchange
Strathcona County		15.4	9.6	Highway 824 north – Ardrossan	
Strathcona County	South Cooking Lake	17.2	10.7		
Beaver County		39.9	24.8	Highway 630 north – Lindbrook; Highway 833 south – Camrose	
Beaver County	Tofield	47.9– 49.2	29.8– 30.6	Highway 834A north	Tofield access; former Highway 834 north
Beaver County		51.4	31.9	Highway 834 – Chipman, Round Hill	
Beaver County	Ryley	66.6	41.4	Highway 854 south – Bawlf	West end of Highway 854 concurrency
Beaver County	Ryley	68.4	42.5	Highway 854 north – Mundare	East end of Highway 854 concurrency
Beaver County	Holden	81.2	50.5	Highway 855 – Mundare, Daysland	
Beaver County	Bruce	95.7	59.5	Highway 857 – Vegreville	
Beaver County	Viking	115.6	71.8	Highway 36 – Two Hills, Killam	
Beaver County	Viking	117.4	72.9	To Highway 619 east (Range Road 130)	
Beaver County		131.9	82.0	Highway 26 west – Camrose	
Beaver County	Kinsella	135.9	84.4	Highway 870 south – Lougheed	West end of Highway 870 concurrency
Beaver County	Kinsella	136.7	84.9	Highway 870 north – Innisfree	East end of Highway 870 concurrency
M.D. of Wainwright No. 61	Irma	158.4	98.4	Highway 881 – Mannville, Hardisty	
M.D. of Wainwright No. 61		173.3	107.7	Highway 883 north	
M.D. of Wainwright No. 61		175.3	108.9	Crosses the Battle River	
M.D. of Wainwright No. 61	Fabyan	177.0	110.0		
Wainwright		186.4	115.8	1 Street	Access to CFB Wainwright
Wainwright		189.7	117.9	Highway 41 – Vermilion, Consort	
M.D. of Wainwright No. 61		204.3	126.9	Highway 610 south – Edgerton, Ribstone, Chauvin	
M.D. of Wainwright No. 61		210.8	131.0	Highway 894 north	West end of Highway 894 concurrency
M.D. of Wainwright No. 61		214.1	133.0	Highway 894 south – Edgerton	East end of Highway 894 concurrency
M.D. of Wainwright No. 61		220.6	137.1	Highway 897 north – Paradise Valley, Kitscoty	
M.D. of Wainwright No. 61		241.9	150.3	Highway 17 south – Macklin	West end of Highway 17 concurrency
M.D. of Wainwright No. 61		244.3	151.8	Highway 17 north – Lloydminster	East end of Highway 17 concurrency
M.D. of Wainwright No. 61		245.1	152.3	Highway 40 east (Poundmaker Trail) – The Battlefords	Continues into Saskatchewan
1.000 mi = 1.609 km; 1.000 km = 0.621 mi: Closed/former; Concurrency terminus; Route transition

== Former auxiliary routes ==
There are three former auxiliary routes of Highway 14 located in the Edmonton area.

=== Highway 14A ===
Highway 14A
- Location: Edmonton
- Length: 3 km (1.9 mi)

Highway 14A
- Location: Strathcona County
- Length: 5 km (3.1 mi)

There are two former alignments of Highway 14A. The first route followed Connors Road and 83 Street between Highway 14, which at the time followed Whyte (82) Avenue, and downtown Edmonton via the Low Level Bridge. The route was phased out in the 1970s. The second route of Highway 14A was 76 Avenue through Strathcona County. Highway 14 formerly shifted south from Whyte (82) Avenue to 76 Avenue before continuing east. When the Sherwood Park Freeway opened in 1968, Highway 14 was moved to the new route and the former route was renumbered as Highway 14A. The route was phased out in the 1970s.

=== Highway 14X ===
Highway 14X
- Location: Strathcona County

Highway 14X was a spur connecting Highway 14 with Highway 16A and Highway 16. The route became part of Highway 216 in 1999.
