= Smeltzer House =

Old house built in 1920

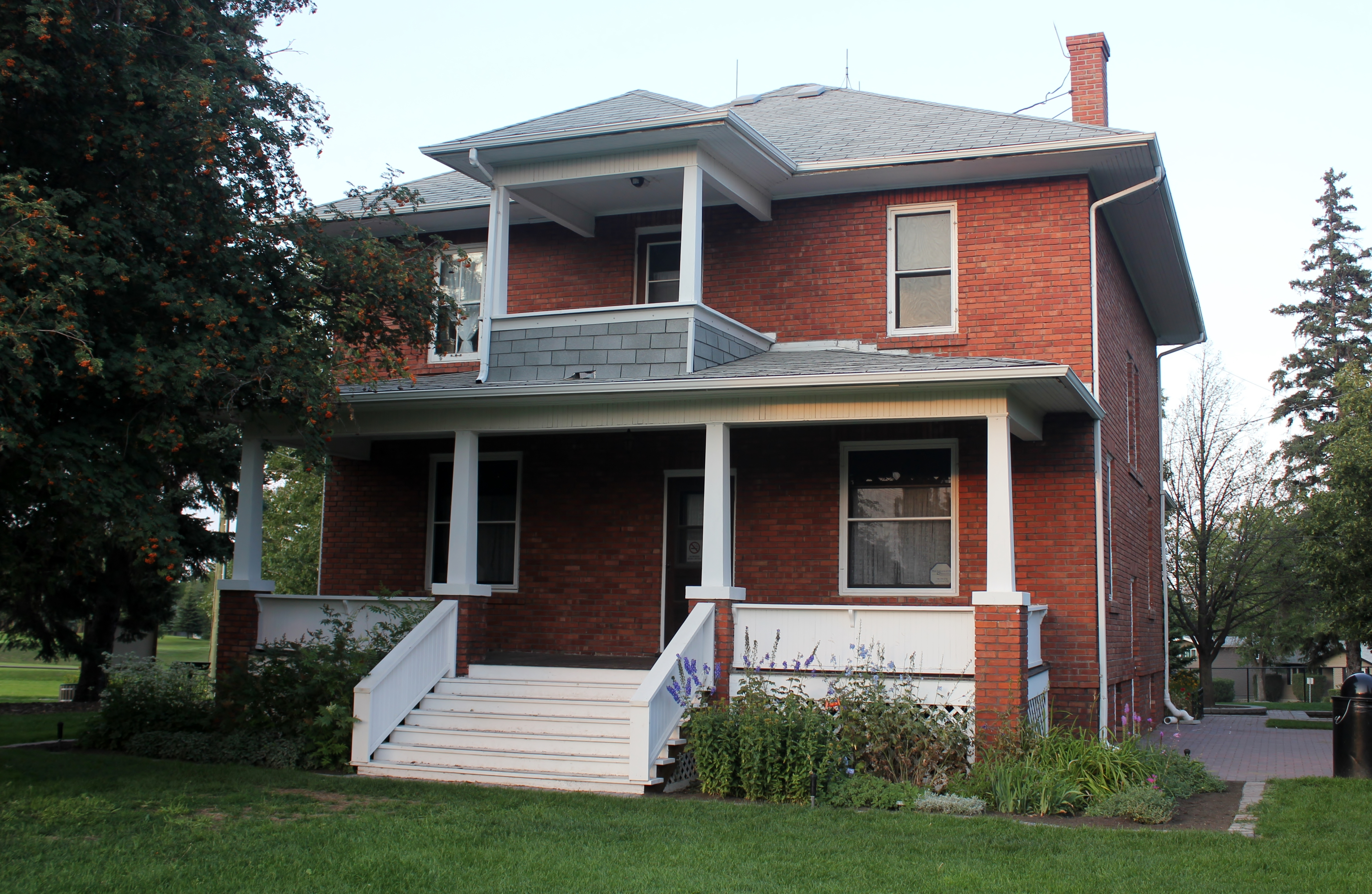
- Smeltzer House (2018)
- Interactive map of the Smeltzer House area
- Alternative names: Smeltzer House Visual Arts Centre

General information
- Status: Completed
- Architectural style: American Foursquare
- Location: 1 Broadmoor Blvd, Sherwood Park, AB T8A 0Z6, Sherwood Park, Canada
- Year built: 1920
- Owner: Strathcona County

Design and construction
- Architect: Cyril Fry

Website
- https://www.strathcona.ca/recreation-events/arts-and-culture/smeltzer-house/

Smeltzer House is a historic building located in Sherwood Park, in Strathcona County, Alberta. It is presently owned and operated by the municipal government of Strathcona County as an arts and crafts and events space. It was designated as a provincial registered historic resource in 1986 and an Alberta municipal historic resource in 2013.

== Overview ==
Smeltzer House was built by Maurice and Eliza Smeltzer in 1920 on a large farm in the former farming district of Salisbury. The farmland surrounding the Smeltzer House, consisting of approximately 600 acres, was sold by the family between 1952 and 1976, and was developed into the community of Sherwood Park. In 1976, Strathcona County purchased the home and surrounding grounds. The Smeltzer House, also known as the Smeltzer House Visual Arts Centre, is presently operated by Strathcona County as an arts and crafts and events space.

== Architecture ==
The Smeltzer House is reflective of many homes built by farmers of modest wealth across the Canadian Prairies. The two-story structure was built in the economical and utilitarian American Foursquare architectural style, complete with a red brick exterior and tinted mortar, symmetrical façade, hipped-roof, two corbelled chimneys, and open front verandah. The home also includes some elements of the Georgian Revival style, including decorative dentils under the eaves and columns that support the front verandah.

The interior of the home is lath and plaster construction, with maple flooring on the first floor and fir flooring on the second. There are numerous decorative features which reflect the family's modest wealth, including leaded glass parlour and piano windows, decorative crown molding and chair rails, green terracotta tiles around the fireplace, and decorative laurels and bow wood appliqués on the doors.

== History ==
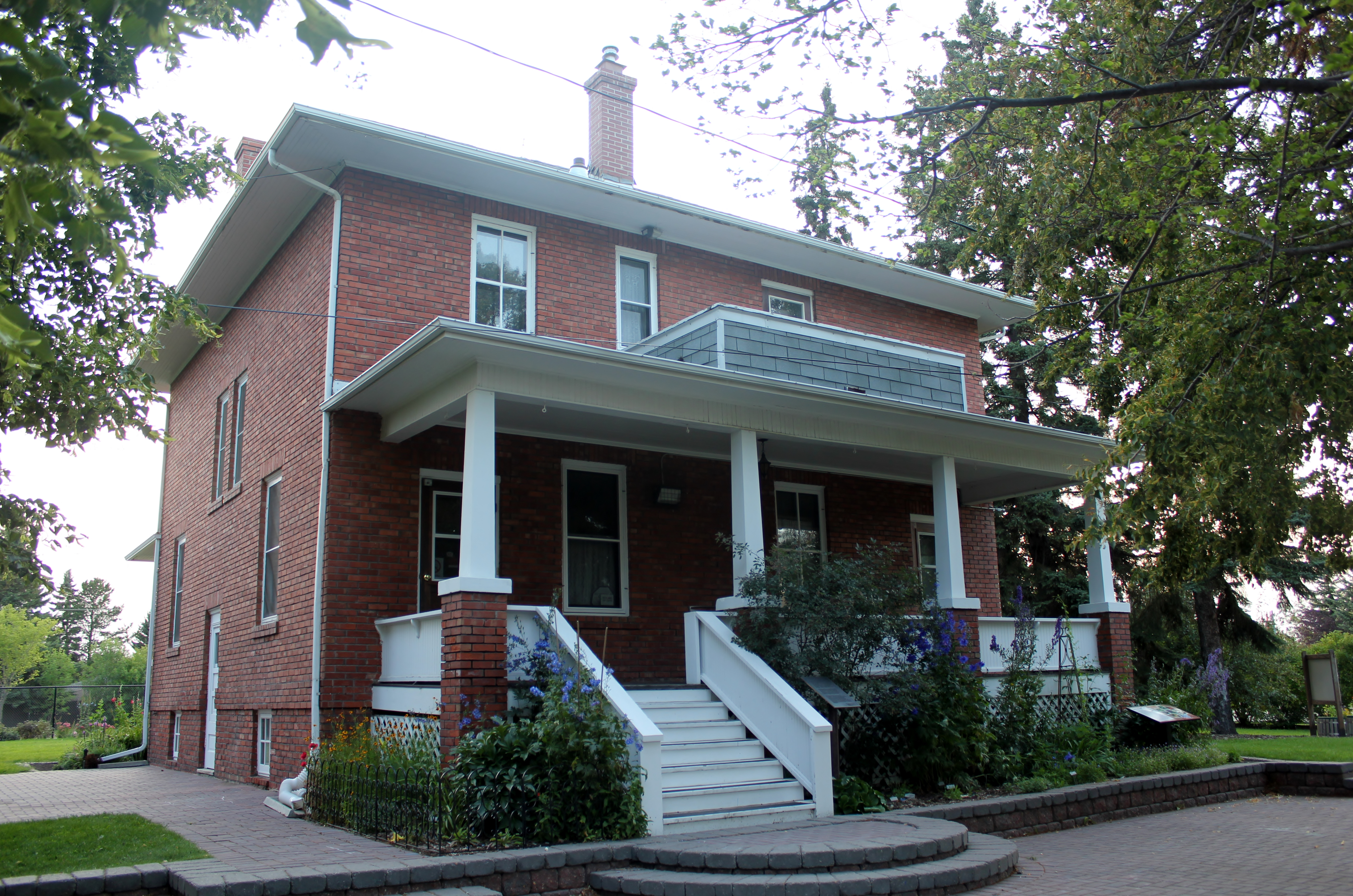
Smeltzer House (rear)

In 1892, Maurice Smeltzer applied for a homestead on a quarter section (160 acres) of farmland in the Salisbury district. A simple wooden two story farmhouse was constructed in 1895 by Smeltzer and his friend Jim McConnell on an adjacent parcel of land. Smeltzer and his wife Eliza (nee Pithie) Smeltzer (m. 1899) lived in the home with their son Frank (b. 1907).

The Smeltzer family gradually expanded their land holdings to include over 600 acres of land and in 1919 hired Cyril Fry, Maurice's brother-in-law, to design a larger permanent residence for them and an accompanying garage. Marshall Hughes, a family friend and contractor, was hired to construct the home and garage. Construction began in 1919. The brick garage and home, featuring double brick walls and a cold storage basement, were completed by the end of 1920.

Smeltzer House when completed had a number of modern features including indoor plumbing, coal burning fireplaces, and electricity. The home's electrical supply was initially generated by a Delco Light-plant in the basement, but this was removed in 1944 after the home was connected to the electrical grid of Edmonton. A larger brick garage was also constructed on the site in the 1950s.

=== Development of Sherwood Park and sale of home ===
Following discovery of large reserves of crude oil in 1947 at the Leduc No. 1 near Leduc, Alberta, supporting oil infrastructure and refineries were constructed in Strathcona County. The construction of a planned community to house workers, Campbelltown (renamed Sherwood Park in 1956), was approved, and in 1952 Frank Smeltzer — who took ownership of the house and farm following his father Maurice's death in 1938 — began selling off parcels of farmland to make room for the community. As the community grew, the Smeltzer's continued to sell pieces of their land.

The Smeltzer family continued to occupy the Smeltzer House until 1974. In 1976, the family sold the home and the surrounding three-acre parcel of land to Strathcona County for $180,000. Following some minor restorative work, the space was opened as an arts and culture and events space in 1978. Additional restoration work on the front and rear verandahs was undertaken in 1990 to restore the exterior of the house to its original condition.

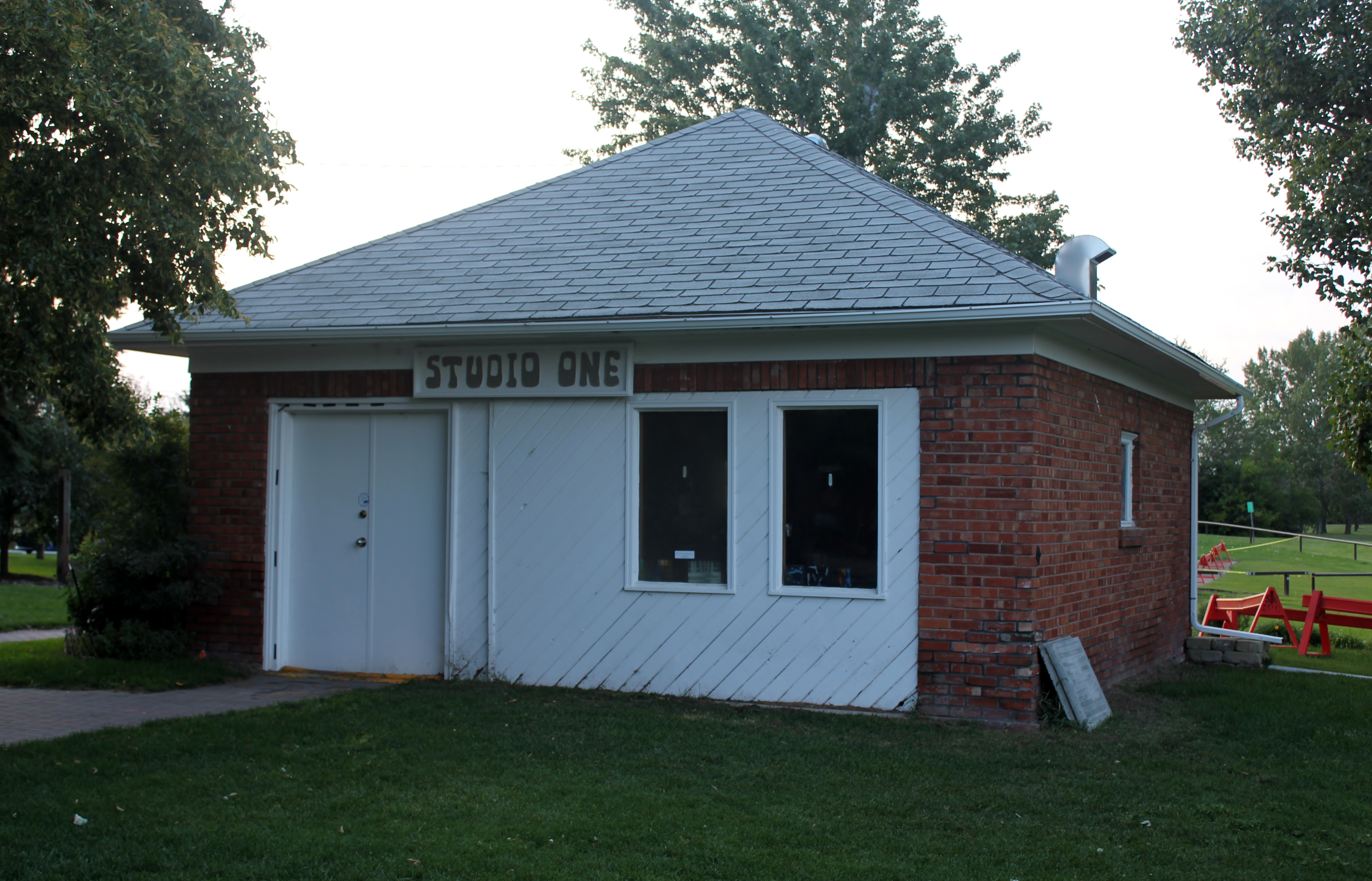
Smeltzer House Garage (constructed 1920), presently used as the Studio One glass studio

== Smeltzer House Visual Arts Centre ==
Presently, Smeltzer House is operated by Strathcona County as an arts and culture and events space. The main home is primarily used for art exhibitions, while the 1920 and 1950s garages have been outfitted as a glass and clay studio respectively.

== See also ==
- Strathcona County
- Sherwood Park
