= South Cooking Lake =

- Hamlet
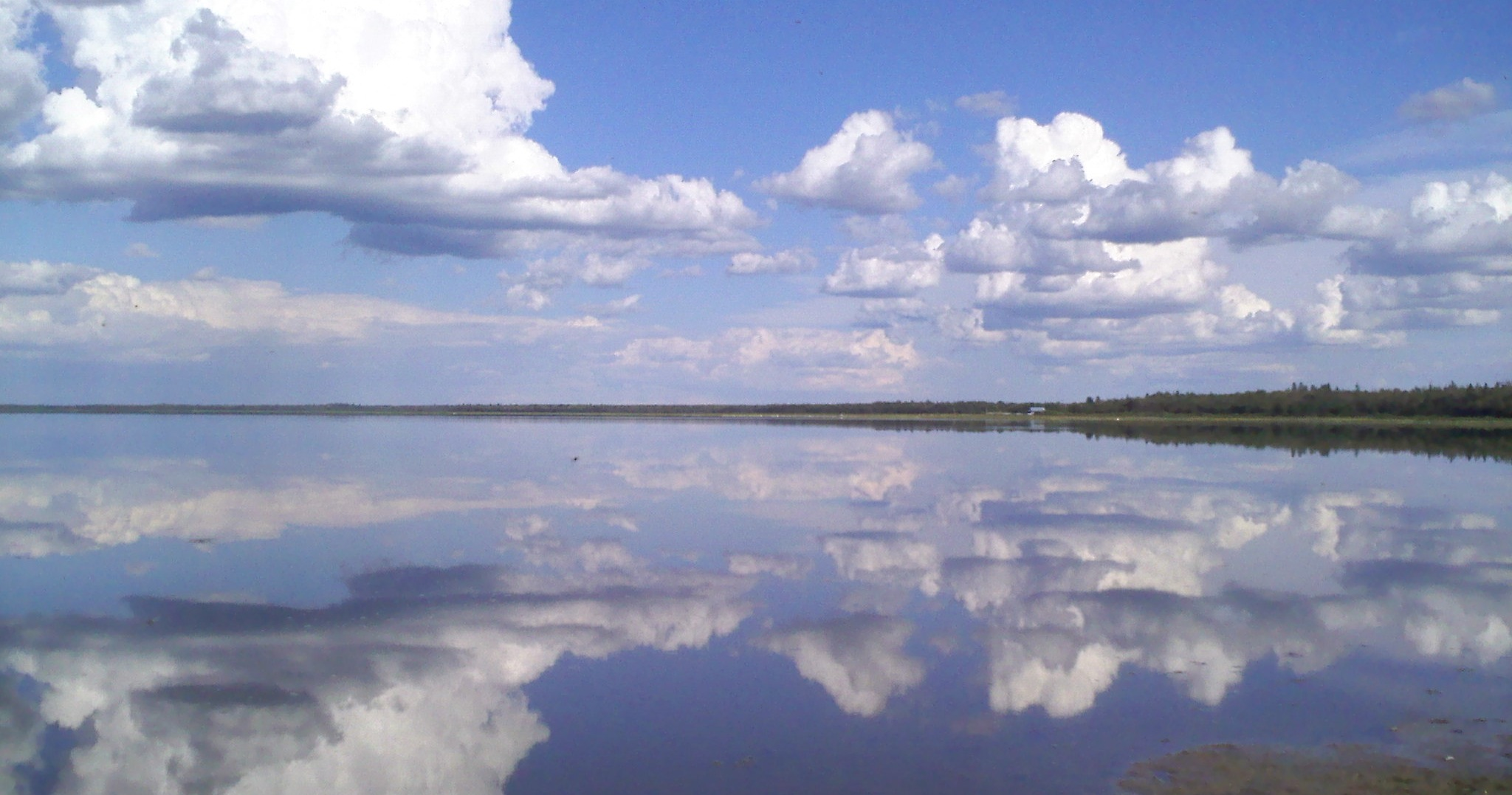
- Cooking Lake

- Location within Strathcona County Location within Alberta
- Coordinates: 53°24′44″N 113°07′10″W
- Country: Canada
- Province: Alberta
- Region: Edmonton Region
- Specialized municipality: Strathcona County
- Settled: 1923

Government
  - Type: Unincorporated
  - Mayor: Rod Frank
  - Governing body: Strathcona County Council: Dave Anderson; Katie Berghofer; Brian Botterill; Linton Delainey; Glen Lawrence; Robert Parks; Paul Smith; Bill Tonita

Area (2021)
  - Land: 2.31 km^{2} (0.89 sq mi)
- Elevation: 737 m (2,418 ft)

Population (2021)
  - Total: 288
  - Density: 124.8/km^{2} (323/sq mi)
- Time zone: UTC−06:00 (Alberta Time)
- Postal code span: T8G
- Area code: +1-780
- Highways: Highway 14
- Website: Strathcona County

South Cooking Lake is a hamlet in Alberta, Canada within Strathcona County. It is located on Highway 14, approximately 19 km (12 mi) southeast of Sherwood Park on the south-west shore of Cooking Lake.

== Overview ==
Prior to the arrival of European settlers, the South Cooking Lake region was inhabited by many Indigenous peoples, including the Cree, Blackfoot and the Sarcee. The name South Cooking Lake is a rough translation of the Cree name for the lake, O-pi-mi-w-sioo-Sakyakn (Here's Where We Cook Lake or Cooking Lake).

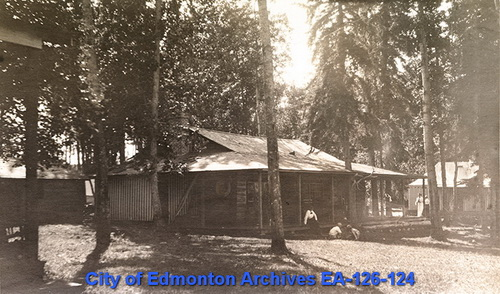
Spruce Lodge, South Cooking Lake, 1914

In 1891, the first settlers arrived at South Cooking Lake and began to farm the area. By 1894, Cooking Lake began attracting visitors from nearby settlements including Edmonton for recreational purposes, with large scale recreational infrastructure being developed by 1900. Popular activities included sailing, swimming, and picnicking. Large numbers of game including lynx, fox, mink, muskrat, elk, deer, moose, wolves, coyotes, and black bears drew sportsmen to the area, while the lake's plentiful fish stocks led it be fished commercially until 1926.

Recreational villages composed of summer cottages, including at South Cooking Lake, quickly developed around Cooking Lake. The Grand Trunk Pacific Railway connecting Edmonton to Winnipeg was even specifically routed to run close to South Cooking Lake to permit greater access to the lake for city residents. Special trains were also run on weekends to ferry passengers.

Although a predominantly summer village community, permanent residents of South Cooking Lake steadily grew and in 1923 the South Cooking Lake Community League was founded.

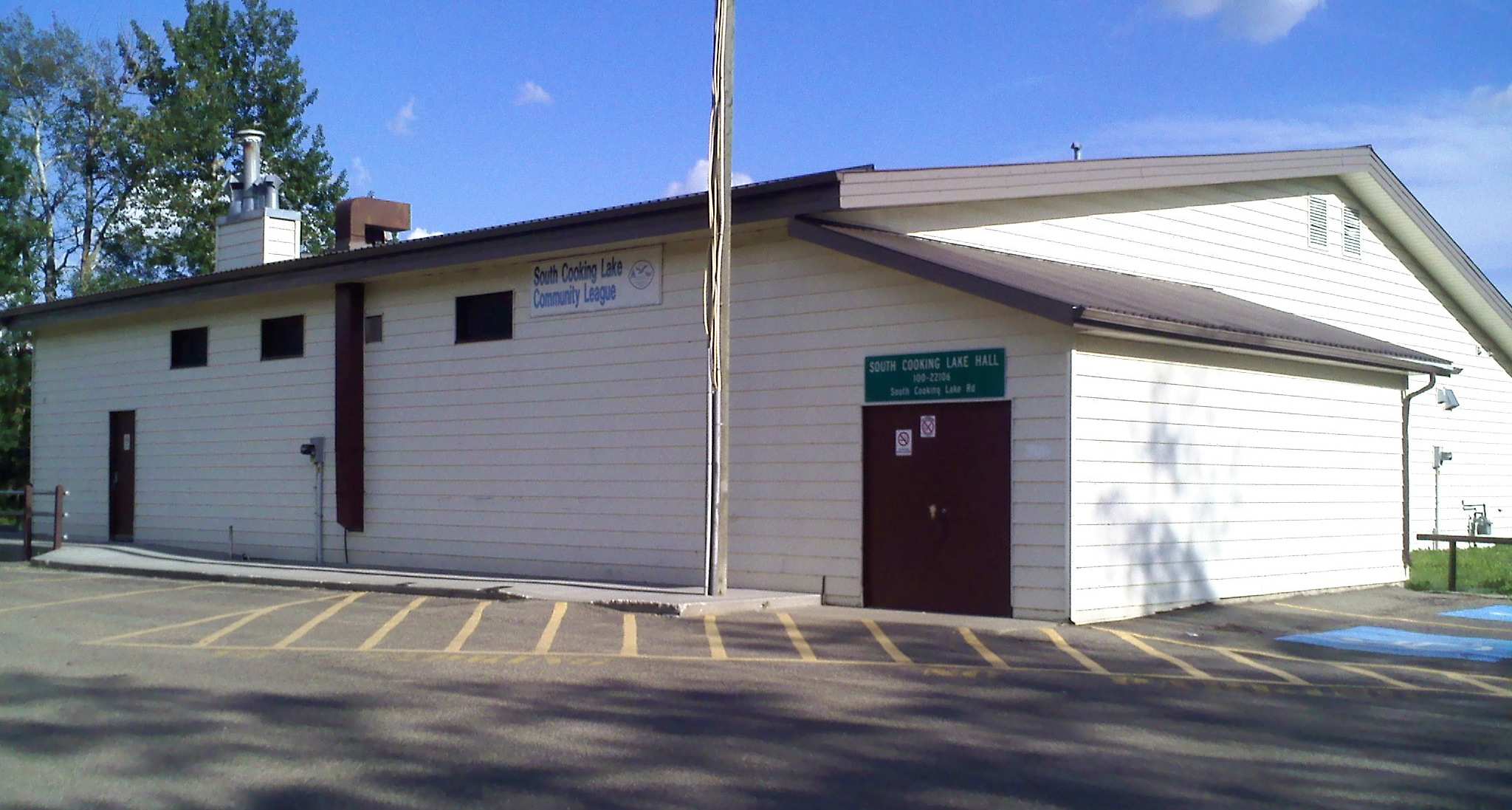
Community Hall

Today it is possible to see a variety of wildlife and birds throughout the area. There is a day-use park for picnics, boating, and windsurfing. There is a boat launch, walking trails, picnic sites, and waterfowl viewing areas. The community hall has been renovated and is available for rent.

== Demographics ==
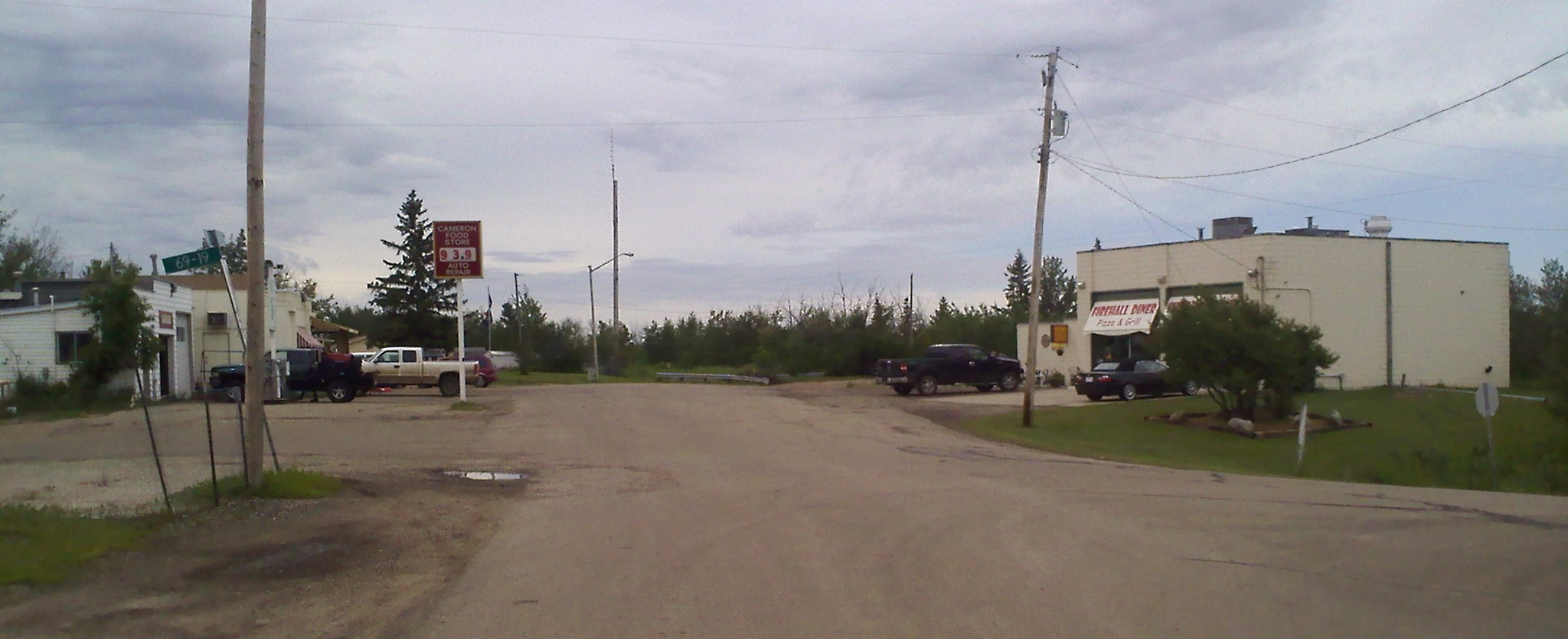
Business district of South Cooking Lake

The population of South Cooking Lake according to the 2024 municipal census conducted by Strathcona County is 291, a 5.1% change from its 2022 municipal census population count of 277.

In the 2021 Census of Population conducted by Statistics Canada, South Cooking Lake had a population of 288 living in 133 of its 138 total private dwellings, a change of 19.5% from its 2016 population of 241. With a land area of 2.31 km^{2} (0.89 sq mi), it had a population density of 124.7/km^{2} (322.9/sq mi) in 2021.

As a designated place in the 2016 Census of Population conducted by Statistics Canada, South Cooking Lake had a population of 241 living in 105 of its 117 total private dwellings, a change of −16.3% from its 2011 population of 288. With a land area of 2.3 km^{2} (0.89 sq mi), it had a population density of 104.8/km^{2} (271.4/sq mi) in 2016.

== Transportation ==
Edmonton/Cooking Lake Airport is located nearby and serves the community.

== See also ==
- List of communities in Alberta
- List of designated places in Alberta
- List of hamlets in Alberta
