= 2024 census =

2024 census may refer to:

- 2024 Alberta municipal censuses
- 2024 Bolivian census
- 2024 Chilean census
- 2024 Moldovan census
- 2024 Moroccan census
- 2024 Philippine census
