= Half Moon Lake, Alberta =

Half Moon Lake Half Moon Estates
- Hamlet
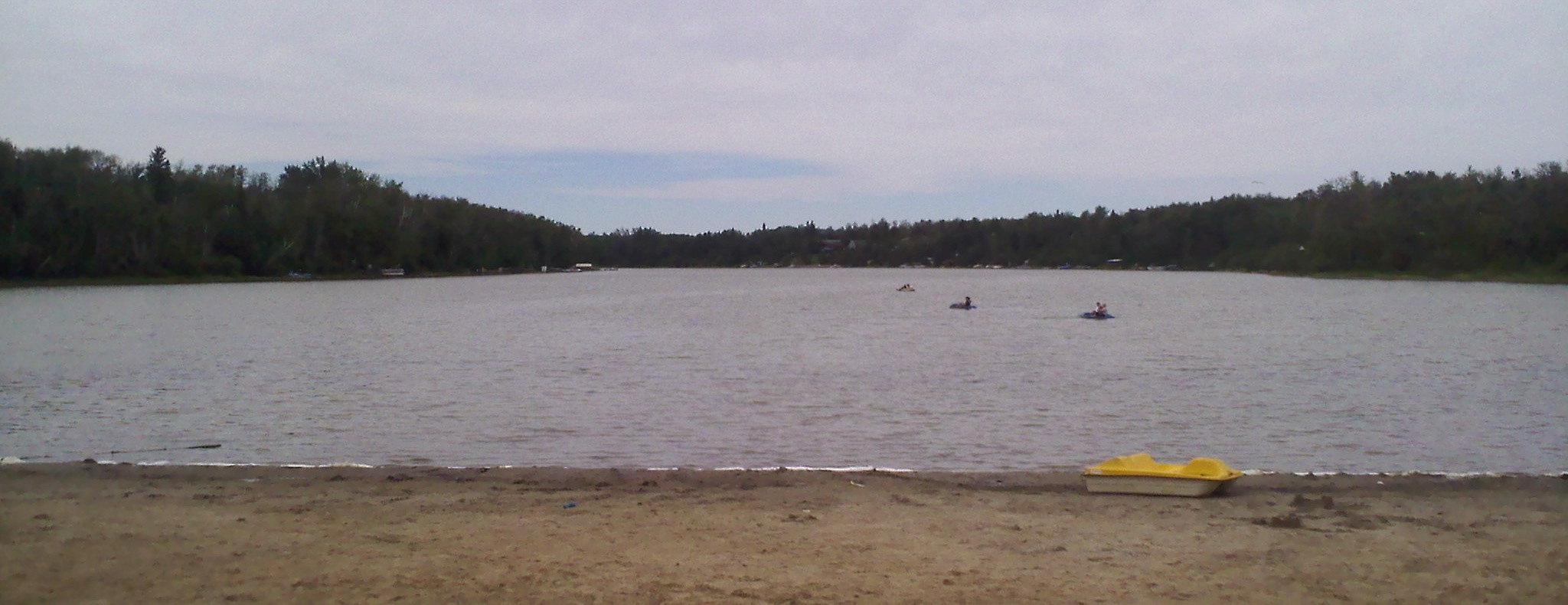
- South end of Half Moon Lake, as seen from Half Moon Lake Resort

- Location of Half Moon Lake in Alberta Half Moon Lake (Canada)
- Coordinates: 53°27′35″N 113°5′38″W
- Country: Canada
- Province: Alberta
- Region: Edmonton Region
- Census division: 11
- Specialized municipality: Strathcona County
- Settled: 1950

Government
  - Type: Unincorporated
  - Mayor: Rod Frank
  - Governing body: Strathcona County Council: Dave Anderson; Katie Berghofer; Brian Botterill; Linton Delainey; Glen Lawrence; Robert Parks; Paul Smith; Bill Tonita

Area (2021)
  - Land: 0.93 km^{2} (0.36 sq mi)
- Elevation: 742 m (2,434 ft)

Population (2021)
  - Total: 87
  - Density: 93.6/km^{2} (242/sq mi)
- Time zone: UTC−06:00 (Alberta Time)
- Postal code span: T8E
- Area code: +1-780
- Highways: Highway 629
- Website: www.strathcona.ab.ca

Half Moon Lake is a hamlet in Alberta, Canada within Strathcona County. It is also recognized as a designated place by Statistics Canada under the name of Half Moon Estates. The community is located on the shores of Half Moon Lake, just north of Highway 629, approximately 13 kilometres (8.1 mi) southeast of Sherwood Park.

The hamlet was founded in the late 1950s when the land north of the lake was subdivided into residential lots, with the subdivision of the south side following soon after.

== Demographics ==
Population history of Half Moon Lake
Year	Pop.	±%
1966	12	—
1971	63	+425.0%
1976	71	+12.7%
1981	73	+2.8%
1986	203	+178.1%
1991	255	+25.6%
1991A	257	+0.8%
1996	285	+10.9%
2001	288	+1.1%
2006	267	−7.3%
2006A	242	−9.4%
2011	250	+3.3%
2016	218	−12.8%
2016R	223	+2.3%
2021	87	−61.0%
Population in 1986 is the sum of Half Moon Lake (100) and Half Moon Estates (103), which are both within the Hamlet of Half Moon Lake. Source: Statistics Canada

The population of Half Moon Lake according to the 2024 municipal census conducted by Strathcona County is 206, a 10.2% change from its 2022 municipal census population count of 187.

In the 2021 Census of Population conducted by Statistics Canada, Half Moon Lake had a population of 87 living in 33 of its 35 total private dwellings, a change of −61% from its 2016 population of 223. With a land area of 0.93 km^{2} (0.36 sq mi), it had a population density of 93.5/km^{2} (242.3/sq mi) in 2021.

As a designated place in the 2016 Census of Population conducted by Statistics Canada, Half Moon Lake had a population of 218 living in 88 of its 103 total private dwellings, a change of −12.8% from its 2011 population of 250. With a land area of 0.51 km^{2} (0.20 sq mi), it had a population density of 427.5/km^{2} (1,107.1/sq mi) in 2016.

== Lake ==
Half Moon Lake is a crescent-shaped body of water that is approximately 2 kilometres (1.2 mi) in length, 250 metres (820 ft) in width and a maximum of 8.5 metres (28 ft) in depth.

Although the lake is surrounded by private land, visitors to Strathcona County will find the commercially run Half Moon Lake Resort at the south end of the lake, which provides access to the lake. The resort, open during the summer months, has campsites, a developed beach, and boat launch.

== See also ==
- List of communities in Alberta
- List of designated places in Alberta
- List of hamlets in Alberta
