= Strathcona County =

Municipality in Alberta, Canada

- Specialized municipality
- Logo

- Location within Alberta
- Coordinates: 53°31′24″N 113°18′32″W
- Country: Canada
- Province: Alberta
- Region: Edmonton Metropolitan Region
- Census division: No. 11
- Municipal district: 1943
- Specialized municipality: January 1, 1996
- Named for: Donald Smith, 1st Baron Strathcona and Mount Royal

Government
  - Mayor: Rod Frank
  - Governing body: Strathcona County Council: Dave Anderson; Katie Berghofer; Brian Botterill; Linton Delainey; Glen Lawrence; Robert Parks; Paul Smith; Bill Tonita
  - Seat: Sherwood Park

Area (2021)
  - Land: 1,170.65 km^{2} (451.99 sq mi)

Population (2021)
  - Total: 99,225
  - Density: 84.8/km^{2} (220/sq mi)
  - Municipal census (2024): 103,829
- Time zone: UTC−06:00 (Alberta Time)
- Website: strathcona.ca

Strathcona County is a specialized municipality in the Edmonton Metropolitan Region within Alberta, Canada between Edmonton and Elk Island National Park. It forms part of Census Division No. 11.

Strathcona County is both urban and rural in nature. Approximately 73% of its population lives in Sherwood Park, which is an urban service area east of Edmonton, remains an unincorporated hamlet. The balance lives beyond Sherwood Park within a rural service area.

== History ==
In Treaty 6, the First Nations ceded their title to the land that would become Strathcona County. Local governance began in 1893 when the North-West Territorial Legislature established an area east of Edmonton as Statute Labour District No. 2. It then grew in size over the following decade and was renamed Local Improvement District (LID) No. 517 in 1913. In 1918, LID No. 517 became a municipal district under the name of the Municipal District (MD) of Clover Bar No. 517. At the same time, the neighbouring LID No. 518 to the south became the MD of Strathcona No. 518.

Predecessor municipalities (1918-1943)
Boundaries of the M.D. of Clover Bar No. 517

Boundaries of the M.D. of Strathcona No. 518

The MD of Clover Bar No. 517 and the MD of Strathcona No. 518 amalgamated on March 1, 1943, into a larger municipal district under the name of the MD of Strathcona No. 517. It was subsequently renumbered as the MD of Strathcona No. 83 in 1945. Upon further amalgamating with the Clover Bar School Division No. 13, the MD of Strathcona No. 83 incorporated as a county under the name of the County of Strathcona No. 20 on January 1, 1962. Its county status reverted to municipal district status in 1995 when the County Act was repealed by the provincial legislature though its name remained County of Strathcona No. 20. Its name was officially changed to Strathcona County on April 26, 1995. Shortly thereafter, Strathcona County's status was changed from municipal district to specialized municipality on January 1, 1996.

The purpose of Strathcona County's change to specialized municipality status was to provide "for the unique needs of a municipality that includes both a large urban centre and a significant rural territory and population." The status change specifically designated Strathcona County's large urban centre, Sherwood Park, as an urban service area deemed equivalent to a city. Its remaining rural territory was specifically designated a rural service area deemed equivalent to a municipal district.

== Geography ==
Strathcona County is in the central portion of the province of Alberta and forms the eastern portion of the Edmonton Metropolitan Region. It borders Lamont County to the northeast, Improvement District No. 13 (Elk Island National Park) to the east, Beaver County to the southeast, Leduc County to the south, the City of Edmonton to the west, the City of Fort Saskatchewan to the northwest, and Sturgeon County to the north. The North Saskatchewan River forms its municipal boundary with Sturgeon County. Some of its water bodies include Cooking Lake, Half Moon Lake, and Hastings Lake.

=== Communities and localities ===
The following urban municipalities are surrounded by Strathcona County.

Cities

- Fort Saskatchewan

Towns

- none

Villages

- none

Summer villages

- none

The following hamlets are located within Strathcona County.

Hamlets

- Antler Lake
- Ardrossan
- Collingwood Cove
- Half Moon Lake
- Hastings Lake
- Josephburg
- North Cooking Lake
- Sherwood Park (urban service area)
- South Cooking Lake

The following localities are located within Strathcona County.

Localities

- Adam Lily Acres
- Akenside
- Akenside Estates
- Arddmoor-Rosswood
- Ardmoor
- Artesian Estates
- Aspen Heights
- Aspen View
- Aurora Place
- Avery Park
- Ball Meadows
- Baronwood
- Beaver Brook Estates
- Beaver Valley Estates
- Beck Estates
- Belvedere Heights
- Belvedere Heights East
- Belvedere Heights West
- Berry Hill
- Best Estates
- Beverly Hills
- Birch Park
- Birchwood Village
- Brecken Woods
- Bremner
- Bretona
- Bretville Junction
- Bristol Estates
- Brookville Estates
- Busenius Estates
- Calebo Estates
- Camelot Square
- Campbelltown
- Campbelltown Heights
- Carriage Lane
- Caswellem
- Century Estates
- Century Meadows
- Chrenek Acres
- Chrenek Estates
- Claireridge Estates
- Clarkdale Meadows
- Clover Bar
- Cloverlea
- Colonel Younger Estates
- Colonial Estates
- Cooking Lake
- Country Club Estates
- Craigavon
- Cranston Place
- Croftland
- Dasmarinas Estates
- Deer Horn Estates
- Deville
- Dixon Crescent
- Dixon Place
- Donaldson Park
- Dowling Estates
- Dunbar
- East Edmonton
- East Whitecroft
- Easton Acres
- Eastwood Estates
- Elk Island
- Elkland Estates
- Executive Estates
- Farrell Estates
- Farrell Properties
- Forest Hills Country Estates
- Fulham Park
- Galloway Park Subdivision
- Garden Estates
- Garden Heights
- Glenwood Park Estates
- Good Hope
- Graham Heights
- Gray Drive Estates
- Greenbrae
- Greenhaven
- Greenhaven Estates
- Greenwood Estates
- Griesbach
- Gunnmanor
- Half Moon Estates
- Hanson Estates
- Hercules
- Heritage Hills
- High Ridge Place
- Highroad Estates
- Hillsdale
- Hillside Park
- Holland Subdivision
- Horton Place
- Hulbert Crescent
- Hunter Heights
- Hunter Hill Estates
- Hyland Hills
- Ireland Subdivision
- Ithacan Drive
- Jidaro Valley Subdivision
- Keding Estates
- Lakeland Village
- Lakeland Village Trailer Park
- Lakeview
- Lakeview Estates
- Lakewood Acres
- Lark Hill Farms
- Las Villas
- Laurina Estates
- Levder's Ridge Subdivision
- Lina Country Estates
- Lincoln Green
- Lindale
- Lindale Park
- Lindberg
- Lueder Ridge
- Lynley Ridge
- Mark Iv Estates
- Marler Subdivision
- Marvin Gardens
- McConnell Estates
- Meadow Court
- Meadow Land Estates
- Meadowbrook Heights
- Meyers Lakeshore Estates
- Midway Estates
- Military Point
- Miniskic Estates
- Newton Estates
- North Queensdale Place
- Ordze Park and Wye Road Garden
- Parker Ridge
- Parklane Estates
- Parkside Estates
- Parkview Ridge
- Parkwood Place
- Partridge Hill
- Paso Valley Subdivision
- Patricia Estates
- Pebble Court
- Penridge Estates
- Pine Grove Acres
- Pleasant View
- Pleasantview Acreages
- Pointe Aux Pins Estates
- Poplar Lake Estates
- Portas Gardens
- Queensdale Place
- Quesnel Country Estates
- Regency Park Estates
- Reno-Ville
- Richlyn Estates
- Rolling Forest Estates
- Roman Estates
- Rose Burn Estate
- Rossbrooke Estates
- Royal Estates
- Royal Gardens
- Ryedale Estates
- Sconadale
- Sconaglen Estates
- Scot Haven
- Scotford
- Shady Lanes
- Sherwood Place
- Sierra Grand Estates
- Silver Birch Hills
- Simmons
- Simpson Grange
- Smithson Acres
- South Bailey
- South Queensdale Place
- Springhill Estate
- Spruce Bend Estate
- Summerwood
- Sun Hill Estates
- Tanglewood Estates
- Tidan Heights
- Trans Oak Estates
- Trevithick
- Trevithick Subdivision
- Twin Island Air Park
- Uncas
- Valley Point
- Verden Place
- Voyageur Estates
- Wellington Estates
- West Whitecroft
- Westpark Estates
- Whitecroft
- Wildwood Village
- Williams Park
- Willow Lake Estates
- Willowdale Estates
- Winfield Heights
- Woodland Downs
- Woodland Park
- Woodville Estates
- Wye Haven
- Wye Knott Village
- Wyeclif
- Wyeknot Village

== Demographics ==
Federal census population history
Year	Pop.	±%
1931	6,293	—
1936	6,844	+8.8%
1941	6,725	−1.7%
1946	6,383	−5.1%
1951	7,591	+18.9%
1956	8,873	+16.9%
1961	12,075	+36.1%
1966	16,185	+34.0%
1971	25,634	+58.4%
1976	42,278	+64.9%
1981	51,579	+22.0%
1986	49,802	−3.4%
1991	56,573	+13.6%
1996	64,176	+13.4%
2001	71,986	+12.2%
2006	82,511	+14.6%
2011	92,490	+12.1%
2016	98,044	+6.0%
2021	99,225	+1.2%
Source: Statistics Canada

The population of Strathcona County according to its 2024 municipal census is 103,829, a change of 3.5% from its 2022 municipal census population of 100,362. Its 2024 population includes 75,575 or 72.8% living in the Sherwood Park urban service area and 28,253 or 27.2% in the rural service area.

In the 2021 Census of Population conducted by Statistics Canada, Strathcona County had a population of 99,225 living in 37,128 of its 38,203 total private dwellings, a change of 1.2% from its 2016 population of 98,024. With a land area of 1,170.65 km^{2} (451.99 sq mi), it had a population density of 84.8/km^{2} (219.5/sq mi) in 2021.

Strathcona County municipal census population breakdown
Component	2024 population	2022 population	2018 population
Sherwood Park urban service area	75,575	73,000	71,332
Rural service area	28,253	27,362	27,049
– Hamlet of Antler Lake		428	435
– Hamlet of Ardrossan		919	532
– Hamlet of Collingwood Cove		375	376
– Hamlet of Half Moon Lake		187	214
– Hamlet of Hastings Lake		102	104
– Hamlet of Josephburg		117	118
– Hamlet of North Cooking Lake		48	57
– Hamlet of South Cooking Lake		277	270
Total Strathcona County	103,829	100,362	98,381

In the 2016 Census of Population conducted by Statistics Canada, Strathcona County had a population of 98,044 living in 35,567 of its 36,354 total private dwellings, a change of 6% from its 2011 population of 92,490. With a land area of 1,182.78 km^{2} (456.67 sq mi), it had a population density of 82.9/km^{2} (214.7/sq mi) in 2016.

=== Ethnicity ===
Panethnic groups in the Municipality of Strathcona County (2001−2021)
Panethnic group	2021		2016		2011		2006		2001	
Panethnic group	Pop.	%	Pop.	%	Pop.	%	Pop.	%	Pop.	%
European (Note: Statistic includes all persons that did not make up part of a visible minority or an indigenous identity.)	83,940	85.89%	85,990	88.63%	82,960	90.67%	75,970	92.82%	67,930	95.11%
Indigenous	4,600	4.71%	3,880	4%	3,480	3.8%	2,270	2.77%	1,510	2.11%
Southeast Asian (Note: Statistic includes total responses of "Filipino" and "Southeast Asian" under visible minority section on census.)	2,820	2.89%	2,110	2.17%	1,150	1.26%	860	1.05%	365	0.51%
South Asian	2,650	2.71%	1,820	1.88%	1,425	1.56%	805	0.98%	485	0.68%
East Asian (Note: Statistic includes total responses of "Chinese", "Korean", and "Japanese" under visible minority section on census.)	1,315	1.35%	1,280	1.32%	1,015	1.11%	980	1.2%	545	0.76%
African	985	1.01%	775	0.8%	455	0.5%	450	0.55%	360	0.5%
Latin American	570	0.58%	455	0.47%	525	0.57%	160	0.2%	85	0.12%
Middle Eastern (Note: Statistic includes total responses of "West Asian" and "Arab" under visible minority section on census.)	370	0.38%	325	0.33%	175	0.19%	160	0.2%	50	0.07%
Other/multiracial (Note: Statistic includes total responses of "Visible minority, n.i.e." and "Multiple visible minorities" under visible minority section on census.)	480	0.49%	380	0.39%	315	0.34%	180	0.22%	95	0.13%
Total responses	97,730	98.49%	97,020	98.96%	91,495	98.92%	81,845	99.19%	71,420	99.21%
Total population	99,225	100%	98,044	100%	92,490	100%	82,511	100%	71,986	100%
Note: Totals greater than 100% due to multiple origin responses

=== Language ===
English was the mother tongue of 88.0% of residents. Other common mother tongues were French (1.7%), Tagalog (1.3%), and German (1.3%). 1.3% claimed both English and a non-official language as first languages, while 0.4% listed both English and French.

Canada Census Mother Tongue - Strathcona County, Alberta
Census	Total	English			French			English & French			Other		
Year	Responses	Count	Trend	Pop %	Count	Trend	Pop %	Count	Trend	Pop %	Count	Trend	Pop %
2021	98,240	86,435	▲0.5%	88.0%	1,655	▼9.3%	1.7%	440	▲72.5%	0.4%	8,320	▼3.3%	8.5%
2016	97,535	86,005	▲4.8%	88.2%	1,825	▲4.3%	1.9%	255	▲21.4%	0.3%	8,605	▲15.4%	8.8%
2011	92,030	82,090	▲12.4%	89.2%	1,750	▲29.6%	1.9%	210	▲40.0%	0.2%	7,455	▲2.0%	8.1%
2006	81,845	73,030	▲13.8%	89.2%	1,350	▲0.7%	1.6%	150	▲100.0%	0.2%	7,310	▲25.6%	8.9%
2001	71,415	64,175	▲12.5%	89.9%	1,340	▲34.7%	1.9%	75	▲15.4%	0.1%	5,820	▲9.7%	8.1%
1996	63,765	57,055	n/a	89.5%	995	n/a	1.6%	65	n/a	0.1%	5,305	n/a	8.3%

== Economy ==
Industrial

As of 2020 Strathcona County had over $12.0 billion worth of industrial projects completed, announced, or under construction. This is aided in part by the concentration of oil refineries on the west side of Sherwood Park. This district, known as Refinery Row, includes some of the largest industrial facilities in Western Canada, such as Imperial's Strathcona Refinery. Originally built in the 1940s, a new refinery was constructed in 1976 and is one of the largest refining facilities in Canada. As well, the Suncor's Edmonton Refinery produces 142,000 barrels per day (22,600 m^{3}/d) of gasoline, diesel, jet fuel, and aviation gasoline. This refinery sits on 247 hectares of land and has been operating for over 65 years. A founding member of Alberta's Industrial Heartland, Strathcona County is home to Canada's largest hydrocarbon refining cluster.

In 2002, when reporting on the industrial growth of Strathcona County, the National Post focused specifically on the companies Lockerbie & Hole Contracting and Jireh Industries. Regarding Jireh Industries, the National Post stated that the company "does aerospace quality machining and makes robots that inspect on-surface and underwater pipelines for cracks and corrosion." As of 2020, the leading industries in Strathcona County were extraction, manufacturing, scientific, construction, trucking and engineering.

Commercial

Strathcona County is home to more than 11,000 businesses, with 3,500 of those businesses comprising employees. A market area population of 1.4 million has resulted in household spending power of $5.6 billion. Strathcona County has over 15,800 highly-skilled graduates available with 94% of residents holding a diploma, certificate, or degree. Within the active business community, there are several resources available to local entrepreneurs to help support their businesses:

- Small Business Week and Conference
- Business Visitation Program
- Business Startup Seminars and Support
- Business Planning and Site Selection Resources

== Arts and culture ==
Strathcona County Library is a publicly funded library with its main branch in Sherwood Park. Its bookmobile provides service to rural residents through 14 regular weekly stops.

The Smeltzer House Visual Arts Centre is operated by Strathcona County as arts and culture programming space. The main home is primarily used for art exhibitions, while the 1920 and 1950s garages have been outfitted as a glass and clay studio respectively.

== Attractions ==
Elk Island National Park is adjacent to Strathcona County to the east.

== Notable Events ==
The Strathcona county panic of 1984, where three bodies were found in close proximity to each other in Strathcona county.

== Government ==
Unlike most Albertan municipal districts, where council appoints a reeve, Strathcona County elects a mayor. Rod Frank was elected in 2017, replacing Roxanne Carr who was elected in 2013.

== Infrastructure ==
=== Airports ===
Strathcona County is home to two public airports. Cooking Lake Airport, which operates as a condo board, accommodates 87 per cent of Strathcona County's public aeronautical transportation needs. It is also the oldest operating public airport in Canada and approved for international flights under the Canada Border Services Agency CANPASS program.

The Warren Thomas Aerodrome, better known as the Josephburg Airport, serves the remaining 13 per cent of Strathcona County's public aeronautical transportation needs.

=== Roads ===
The following provincial highways service Strathcona County.

- Highway 14 (Poundmaker Highway)
- Highway 15
- Highway 16 (TCH) (Yellowhead Highway route of Trans-Canada Highway)
- Highway 21
- Highway 38
- SPF (Sherwood Park Freeway)
- Highway 216 (Anthony Henday Drive)
- Highway 628
- Highway 629
- Highway 630 (Wye Road)
- Highway 824
- Highway 830

=== Sports ===
Strathcona Druids RFC

== See also ==
- List of communities in Alberta
- List of municipalities in Alberta
- List of specialized municipalities in Alberta
