= 2024 Alberta municipal censuses =

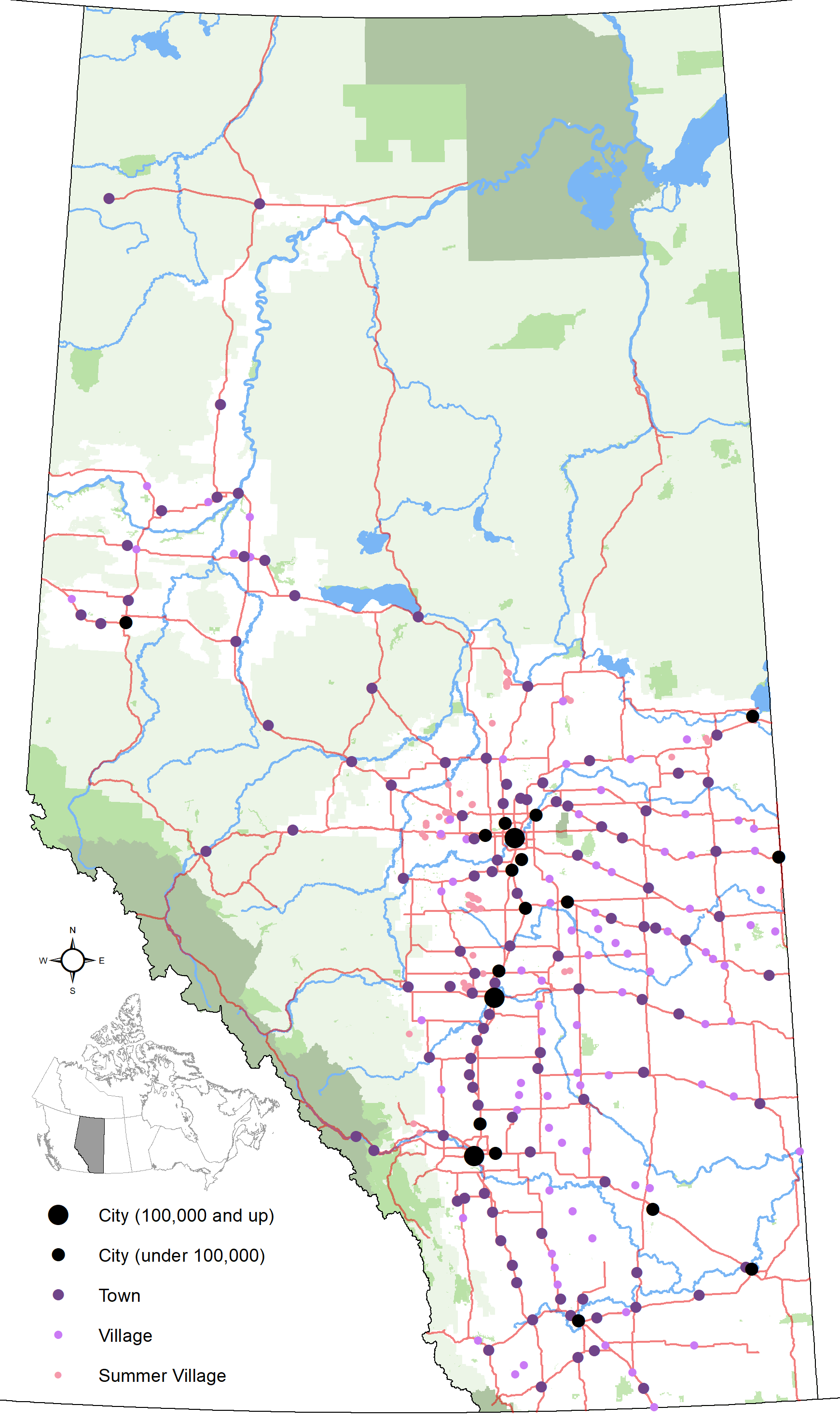
- Distribution of Alberta's 260 urban municipalities

Alberta has provincial legislation allowing its municipalities to conduct municipal censuses. Municipalities choose to conduct their own censuses for multiple reasons such as to better inform municipal service planning and provision, inform an electoral boundary review, or to simply update their populations since the last federal census.

Alberta began the year of 2024 with 342 municipalities. Of these, 24 notified Alberta Municipal Affairs of their intentions to conduct a municipal census in 2024. Censuses were ultimately conducted by five cities, ten towns, two villages, two specialized municipalities, three municipal districts, and one improvement district.

== Municipal census results ==
The following summarizes the results of those 23 municipal censuses conducted in 2024.

| 2024 municipal census summary | | | | 2021 federal census comparison | | | | Previous municipal census comparison | | | |
| Municipality | Status | Census date | 2024 pop. | 2021 pop. | Absolute growth | Absolute change | Annual growth rate | Prev. pop. | Prev. census year | Absolute growth | Annual growth rate |
|---|---|---|---|---|---|---|---|---|---|---|---|
| Airdrie | City | April 1, 2024 | 85,805 | 74,100 | 11,705 | 15.8% | 5.0% | 80,649 | 2023 | 5,156 | 6.4% |
| Alix | Village | May 7, 2024 | 781 | 774 | 7 | 0.9% | 0.3% | 775 | 1998 | 6 | 0.0% |
| Blackfalds | Town | May 6, 2024 | 11,415 | 10,470 | 945 | 9% | 2.9% | 11,015 | 2021 | 400 | 1.2% |
| Bonnyville | Town | May 1, 2024 | 6,675 | 6,404 | 271 | 4.2% | 1.4% | 6,422 | 2017 | 253 | 0.1% |
| Carmangay | Village | June 19, 2024 | 308 | 269 | 39 | 14.5% | 4.6% | 250 | 2017 | 58 | 3.0% |
| Carstairs | Town | April 15, 2024 | 5,313 | 4,898 | 415 | 8.5% | 2.7% | 2,501 | 2005 | 2,812 | 4.0% |
| Chestermere | City | May 1, 2024 | 28,129 | 22,163 | 5,966 | 26.9% | 8.3% | 20,732 | 2018 | 7,397 | 5.2% |
| Cochrane | Town | April 2, 2024 | 37,011 | 32,199 | 4,812 | 14.9% | 4.8% | 29,277 | 2019 | 7,734 | 4.8% |
| Crossfield | Town | May 1, 2024 | 4,211 | 3,599 | 612 | 17% | 5.4% | 3,371 | 2018 | 834 | 4.5% |
| Falher | Town | April 15, 2024 | 1,039 | 1,001 | 38 | 30.8% | 1.2% | 1,172 | 1990 | −133 | −0.4% |
| Flagstaff County | Municipal district | May 1, 2024 | 3,660 | 3,694 | −34 | −0.9% | −0.3% | 4,507 | 1984 | −847 | −0.5% |
| Fort Saskatchewan | City | April 1, 2024 | 29,857 | 27,088 | 2,769 | 10.2% | 3.3% | 28,624 | 2023 | 1,233 | 4.3% |
| Fox Creek | Town | May 10, 2024 | 2,015 | 1,792 | 223 | 12.4% | 4.0% | 1,789 | 2019 | 226 | 2.4% |
| Grande Prairie | City | May 1, 2024 | 70,385 | 64,141 | 6,244 | 9.7% | 3.1% | 69,088 | 2018 | 1,297 | 0.3% |
| County of Grande Prairie No. 1 | Municipal district | April 3, 2024 | 26,701 | 24,623 | 2,078 | 8.4% | 2.7% | 17,989 | 2006 | 8,712 | 2.2% |
| Improvement District No. 4 (Waterton) | Improvement district | May 15, 2024 | 166 | 132 | 34 | 25.8% | 7.9% | 108 | 2018 | 58 | 7.4% |
| MD of Lesser Slave River No. 124 | Municipal district | April 28, 2024 | 2,809 | 2,861 | −52 | −1.8% | −0.6% | 2,811 | 2019 | −2 | 0.0% |
| Mackenzie County | Specialized municipality | May 13, 2024 | 14,380 | 12,804 | 1,576 | 12.3% | 3.9% | 12,512 | 2018 | 1,868 | 2.3% |
| Mundare | Town | May 1, 2024 | 858 | 792 | 66 | 8.3% | 2.7% | 823 | 2009 | 35 | 0.3% |
| Oyen | Town | June 15, 2024 | 970 | 917 | 53 | 5.8% | 1.9% | 1,022 | 2017 | −52 | −0.7% |
| Penhold | Town | | 3,854 | 3,484 | 370 | 10.6% | 3.4% | 3,563 | 2019 | 291 | 1.6% |
| St. Albert | City | May 6, 2024 | 72,316 | 68,232 | 4,084 | 6% | 2.0% | 66,082 | 2018 | 6,234 | 1.5% |
| Strathcona County | Specialized municipality | May 1, 2024 | 103,829 | 99,225 | 4,604 | 4.6% | 1.5% | 100,362 | 2022 | 3,467 | 1.7% |
| Sylvan Lake | Town | April 15, 2024 | 16,275 | 15,995 | 280 | 1.8% | 0.6% | 13,015 | 2013 | 3,260 | 2.1% |

== Breakdowns ==
=== Urban and rural service areas ===
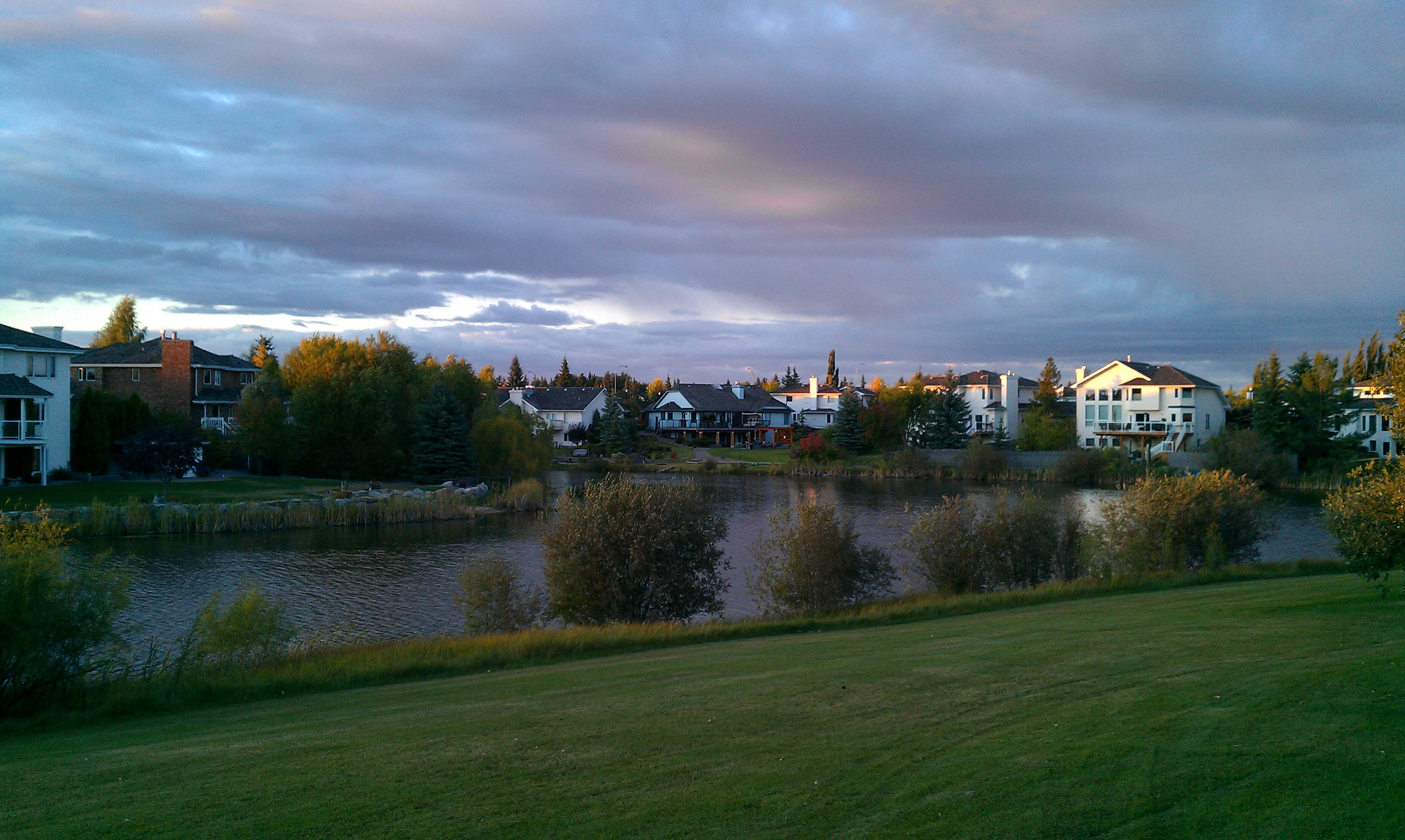
Sherwood Park is an urban service area within Strathcona County.

| 2024 municipal census summary | | 2022 municipal census comparison | | |
| Area | 2024 population | Previous population | Absolute growth | Annual growth rate |
|---|---|---|---|---|
| Sherwood Park urban service area (Note: The Sherwood Park urban service area is deemed equivalent to a city.) | 75,575 | 73,000 | 2,575 | 1.7% |
| Rural service area (Note: Strathcona County's rural service area is deemed equivalent to a municipal district.) | 28,253 | 27,362 | 891 | 1.6% |
| Total Strathcona County | 103,829 | 100,362 | 3,467 | 1.7% |

=== Hamlets ===
The following is a list of hamlet populations determined by the 2024 municipal census conducted by Strathcona County, excluding the Sherwood Park urban service area that is presented above.

| 2024 municipal census summary | | | Previous census comparison | | | |
| Hamlet | Municipality | 2024 population | Previous population | Previous census year | Absolute growth | Annual growth rate |
|---|---|---|---|---|---|---|
| Antler Lake | Strathcona County | 439 | 428 | 2022 | 11 | 1.3% |
| Ardrossan | Strathcona County | 1,238 | 919 | 2022 | 319 | 16.1% |
| Bezanson | County of Grande Prairie No. 1 | 146 | 133 | 2021 | 13 | 3.2% |
| Buffalo Lakes | County of Grande Prairie No. 1 | 5 | | | | |
| Clairmont | County of Grande Prairie No. 1 | 6,123 | 5,135 | 2021 | 988 | 6.0% |
| Collingwood Cove | Strathcona County | 371 | 375 | 2022 | −4 | −0.5% |
| Demmitt | County of Grande Prairie No. 1 | 0 | | | | |
| Dimsdale | County of Grande Prairie No. 1 | 29 | | | | |
| Elmworth | County of Grande Prairie No. 1 | 5 | | | | |
| Fort Vermilion | Mackenzie County | 772 | 753 | 2021 | 19 | 0.8% |
| Goodfare | County of Grande Prairie No. 1 | 15 | | | | |
| Halcourt | County of Grande Prairie No. 1 | 5 | | | | |
| Half Moon Lake | Strathcona County | 206 | 187 | 2022 | 19 | 5.0% |
| Hastings Lake | Strathcona County | 110 | 102 | 2022 | 8 | 3.8% |
| Huallen | County of Grande Prairie No. 1 | 10 | | | | |
| Hythe | County of Grande Prairie No. 1 | 835 | 854 | 2021 | −19 | −0.7% |
| Josephburg | Strathcona County | 122 | 117 | 2022 | 5 | 2.1% |
| La Crete | Mackenzie County | 4,010 | 3,856 | 2021 | 154 | 1.3% |
| La Glace | County of Grande Prairie No. 1 | 174 | 179 | 2021 | −5 | −0.9% |
| Lymburn | County of Grande Prairie No. 1 | 5 | | | | |
| North Cooking Lake | Strathcona County | 53 | 48 | 2022 | 5 | 5.1% |
| South Cooking Lake | Strathcona County | 291 | 277 | 2022 | 14 | 2.5% |
| Teepee Creek | County of Grande Prairie No. 1 | 20 | | | | |
| Valhalla Centre | County of Grande Prairie No. 1 | 38 | 40 | 2021 | −2 | −1.7% |
| Wedgewood | County of Grande Prairie No. 1 | 736 | 752 | 2021 | −16 | −0.7% |

== Shadow population ==
Alberta Municipal Affairs defines shadow population as "temporary residents of a municipality who are employed by an industrial or commercial establishment in the municipality for a minimum of 30 days within a municipal census year." Three municipalities conducted a shadow population count in 2024. The following presents the results of these count for comparison with their concurrent municipal census results.

| Municipality | Status | Municipal census population | Shadow population | Combined population |
|---|---|---|---|---|
| Improvement District No. 4 (Waterton) | Improvement district | 166 | 384 | 550 |
| Fox Creek | Town | 2,015 | 413 | 2,428 |
| Oyen | Town | 970 | 195 | 1,165 |

== See also ==
- List of communities in Alberta
