= Josephburg =

- Hamlet
- Location of Josephburg in Alberta
- Coordinates: 53°42′48″N 113°4′12″W
- Country: Canada
- Province: Alberta
- Region: Edmonton Metropolitan Region
- Census division: 11
- Specialized municipality: Strathcona County
- Settled: 1890s

Government
  - Type: Unincorporated
  - Mayor: Rod Frank
  - Governing body: Strathcona County Council: Dave Anderson; Katie Berghofer; Brian Botterill; Linton Delainey; Glen Lawrence; Robert Parks; Paul Smith; Bill Tonita

Area (2021)
  - Land: 2.47 km^{2} (0.95 sq mi)
- Elevation: 640 m (2,100 ft)

Population (2021)
  - Total: 127
  - Density: 51.3/km^{2} (133/sq mi)
- Time zone: UTC−06:00 (Alberta Time)
- Postal code span: T5B
- Area codes: 780, 587, 825
- Highways: Highway 830
- Website: Strathcona County -Josephburg

Josephburg is a hamlet in Alberta, Canada within Strathcona County. It is located on Highway 830, 6.5 kilometres (4.0 mi) east of Fort Saskatchewan. It is near Alberta's Industrial Heartland, home to petrochemical industries.

The Warren Thomas (Josephburg) Aerodrome, a local airport serving Strathcona County and Alberta's Industrial Heartland, is located near Josephburg. Josephburg was founded by German immigrants.

== Demographics ==
Population history of Josephburg
Year	Pop.	±%
1951	38	—
1956	68	+78.9%
1961	107	+57.4%
1966	123	+15.0%
1971	157	+27.6%
1976	150	−4.5%
1981	152	+1.3%
1986	150	−1.3%
1991	142	−5.3%
1991A	143	+0.7%
1996	144	+0.7%
2001	146	+1.4%
2006	144	−1.4%
2006A	154	+6.9%
2011	142	−7.8%
2016	123	−13.4%
2021	127	+3.3%
Source: Statistics Canada

The population of Josephburg according to the 2024 municipal census conducted by Strathcona County is 122, a 4.3% change from its 2022 municipal census population count of 117.

In the 2021 Census of Population conducted by Statistics Canada, Josephburg had a population of 127 living in 60 of its 67 total private dwellings, a change of 3.3% from its 2016 population of 123. With a land area of 2.47 km^{2} (0.95 sq mi), it had a population density of 51.4/km^{2} (133.2/sq mi) in 2021.

As a designated place in the 2016 Census of Population conducted by Statistics Canada, Josephburg had a population of 123 living in 60 of its 61 total private dwellings, a change of −13.4% from its 2011 population of 142. With a land area of 2.48 km^{2} (0.96 sq mi), it had a population density of 49.6/km^{2} (128.5/sq mi) in 2016.

== See also ==
- List of communities in Alberta
- List of designated places in Alberta
- List of hamlets in Alberta
