= Ardrossan, Alberta =

Ardrossan
- Hamlet
- Location in Strathcona County Location in Alberta
- Coordinates: 53°33′8″N 113°8′30″W
- Country: Canada
- Province: Alberta
- Region: Edmonton Metropolitan Region
- Specialized municipality: Strathcona County

Government
  - Type: Unincorporated
  - Mayor: Rod Frank
  - Governing body: Strathcona County Council: Dave Anderson; Katie Berghofer; Brian Botterill; Linton Delainey; Glen Lawrence; Robert Parks; Paul Smith; Bill Tonita

Area (2021)
  - Land: 2.5 km^{2} (0.97 sq mi)
- Elevation: 708 m (2,323 ft)

Population (2021)
  - Total: 898
  - Density: 358.7/km^{2} (929/sq mi)
- Time zone: UTC−06:00 (Alberta Time)
- Postal code span: T8G
- Area codes: 780, 587, 825
- Highways: Highway 824 and Highway 69
- Website: Strathcona County

Ardrossan is a hamlet in Alberta, Canada, within Strathcona County. It is located on Highway 824, approximately 7 kilometres (4.3 mi) east of Sherwood Park.

The community takes its name from Ardrossan, in Scotland.

Ardrossan is located directly to the east of Sherwood Park, and is just south of the Yellowhead Highway on Range Road 222. It can also be accessed by Township Road 530 coming out of Sherwood Park.

Ardrossan has a large recreation complex.

== History ==
Ardrossan was pioneered by homesteaders in the late 1880s.

== Demographics ==
Population history of Ardrossan
Year	Pop.	±%
1961	84	—
1966	118	+40.5%
1971	137	+16.1%
1976	126	−8.0%
1981	103	−18.3%
1986	115	+11.7%
1991	176	+53.0%
2016	484	+175.0%
2021	898	+85.5%
Source: Statistics Canada

The population of Ardrossan according to the 2024 municipal census conducted by Strathcona County is 1,238, a 34.7% change from its 2022 municipal census population count of 919.

In the 2021 Census of Population conducted by Statistics Canada, Ardrossan had a population of 898 living in 309 of its 319 total private dwellings, a change of 85.5% from its 2016 population of 484. With a land area of 2.5 km^{2} (0.97 sq mi), it had a population density of 359.2/km^{2} (930.3/sq mi) in 2021.

== Education ==
There are three schools in the hamlet. Ardrossan Elementary School, and Ardrossan Junior Senior High School, both operated by Elk Island Public Schools, and Holy Redeemer Catholic School, operated by Elk Island Catholic Schools. The junior/senior high school also houses the Ardrossan Community Theatre and the sports fields surrounding the schools were recently redeveloped with new baseball diamonds, soccer fields, football fields and a tennis court.

== See also ==
- List of communities in Alberta
- List of hamlets in Alberta
