= Sherwood Park Freeway =

Highway in Alberta, Canada

Sherwood Park Freeway
- Alberta Highway 100
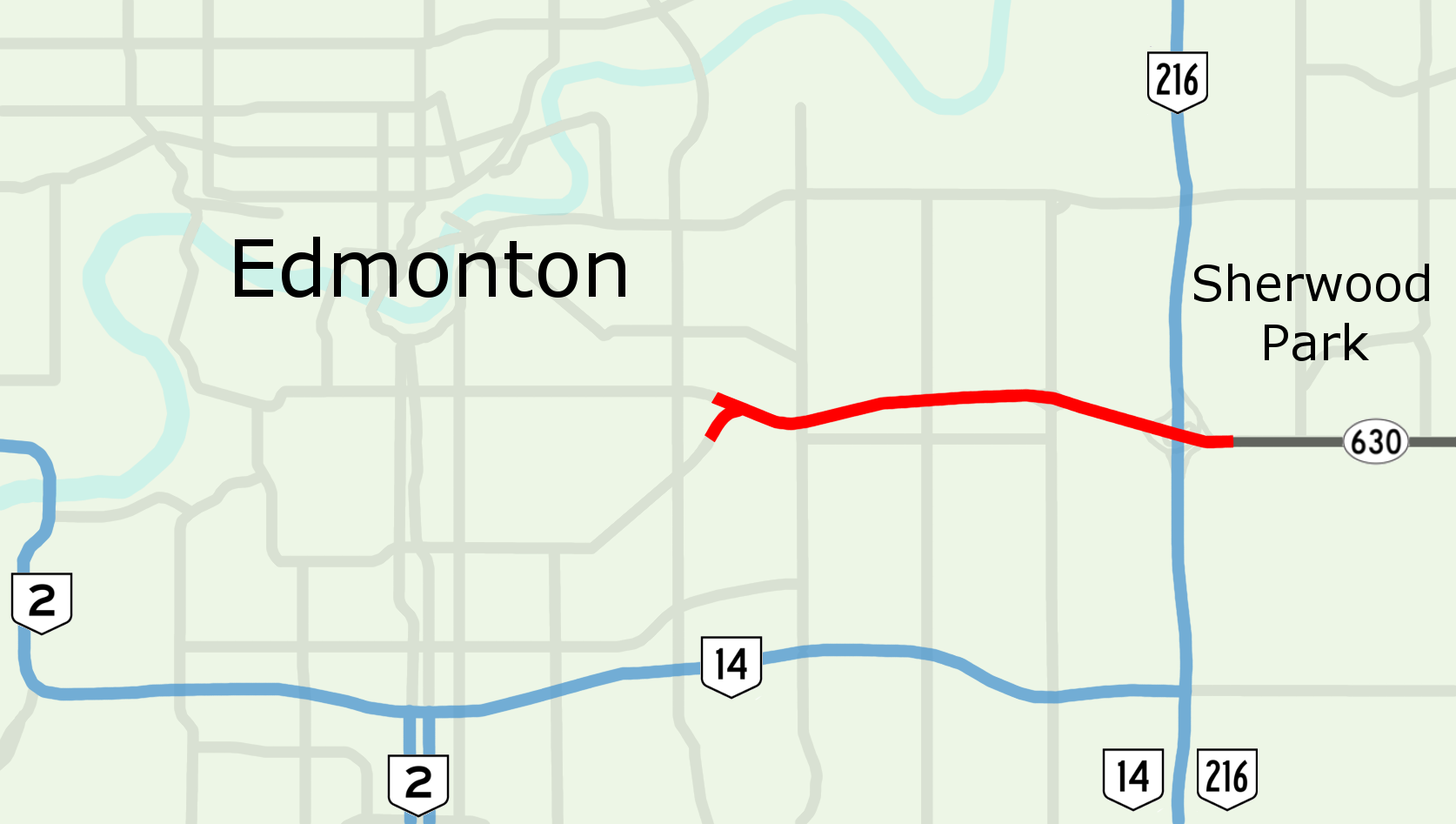
- Major highways of Edmonton with Sherwood Park Freeway highlighted in red

Route information
- Maintained by the City of Edmonton and Alberta Transportation
- Length: 7.1 km (4.4 mi)
- History: 1964 (construction begins); 1968 (completed)

Major junctions
- West end: 71 Street/Argyll Road in Edmonton
- 50 Street; Anthony Henday Drive
- East end: Wye Road in Sherwood Park

Location
- Country: Canada
- Province: Alberta
- Municipalities: Strathcona County
- Major cities: Edmonton; Sherwood Park

Highway system
- Alberta Numbered Highway Network; List; Former
← Highway 93	→ Highway 201

Sherwood Park Freeway is a 7.1-kilometre (4.4 mi) freeway that connects east Edmonton to Sherwood Park in Alberta, Canada. It begins in the Gainer Industrial area, where Argyll Road and 82 (Whyte) Avenue merge, before it intersects 50 Street. It then curves slightly northeast through industrial areas in southeastern Edmonton across 34 Street into Strathcona County, then across 17 Street, and the freeway ends at Anthony Henday Drive. It then continues into Sherwood Park as Wye Road (Highway 630). It is primarily a commuter route, with heavier weekday volume westbound in the morning and eastbound in the afternoon, as residents of Sherwood Park commute to Edmonton.

Officially designated by Alberta Transportation as Highway 100, construction of Sherwood Park Freeway was completed in 1968 as a free-flowing alignment of Highway 14 several hundred metres north of the former two-lane road, which was then re-signed as Highway 14A and is now known as 76 Avenue. Whitemud Drive took over the designation of Highway 14 upon its completion in 1993.

== Route description ==
Sherwood Park Freeway is a suburban freeway with a grass median for its entire length, bisecting industrial and commercial areas in southeast Edmonton and at the western edge of Strathcona County. The freeway begins south of the Kenilworth neighbourhood in the Gainer Industrial area. Immediately east of 71 Street, two lanes each from 82 Avenue and Argyll Road converge, eventually merging to form two eastbound lanes with a posted speed limit of 80 km/h (50 mph). The freeway passes underneath a railway overpass to a diamond interchange at 50 Street, after which the speed limit increases to 100 km/h (62 mph) and the road passes between the Morris Industrial area to the north and the Weir Industrial area to the south. The freeway then reaches a second diamond interchange at 34 Street and enters Strathcona County. Between 34 Street and Anthony Henday Drive, the boundary between Edmonton and Strathcona County follows the southern edge of Sherwood Park Freeway's right of way. The speed limit is reduced to 80 km/h prior to a third diamond interchange at 17 Street.

Shortly after 17 Street, the freeway meets Anthony Henday Drive at a combination interchange. A high capacity, two-lane, semi-directional flyover carries traffic eastbound on Sherwood Park Freeway to northbound Anthony Henday Drive. The other three left turn movements are provided by loop ramps. 800 m (2,600 ft) east of Anthony Henday Drive, the Highway 100 and Sherwood Park Freeway designations officially end, and the freeway continues as a major arterial named Wye Road into Sherwood Park. Wye Road continues through Sherwood Park becoming Highway 630 at Highway 21, travelling through the rural areas of Strathcona County, eventually connecting with Highway 14 west of Tofield.

The eastern half of the route from 34 Street to Anthony Henday Drive is designated as Highway 100 by Alberta Transportation, but is not signed as such at any point along the route. The western segment is under the jurisdiction of the City of Edmonton. Between Anthony Henday Drive and 17 Street, Sherwood Park Freeway carried approximately 40,000 vehicles per day in 2019, with heavy westbound volume in the morning peak hours and eastbound in the afternoon as commuters travel to and from the primarily residential community of Sherwood Park.

Strathcona County Transit operates routes 401, 403, and 404 along the freeway to Edmonton from Ordze Transit Centre on Wye Road.

== History ==
In the early 1900s, Wye Road followed the alignment of present-day 76 Avenue out of Edmonton to the east, en route to North Cooking Lake. By the 1920s it had become a secondary unsurfaced thoroughfare, and was later named Highway 14. As Edmonton and the newly developed Sherwood Park grew in the late 1960s, a free-flowing road, Sherwood Park Freeway, was built to link the two on a new alignment of Highway 14 several hundred meters north of Wye Road. The cloverleaf interchange at the freeway's east end was completed in 1965, and the remaining interchanges were completed in 1968. It was four lanes wide and included an additional interchange immediately east of 17 Street that has since been removed. After completion of Sherwood Park Freeway, the existing Highway 14 (76 Avenue) was renamed to Highway 14A. Further south, Whitemud Drive was constructed and eventually extended east to reach Highway 14. It then assumed the designation of Highway 14 to a new terminus at Calgary Trail. The Highway 14A designation has since been removed from 76 Avenue, and the portion of Sherwood Park Freeway within Strathcona County was eventually renumbered Highway 100.

Extensive upgrades to the eastern end of the freeway were finished in 2016 as part of a project completing the final northeast segment of the Anthony Henday Drive ring road. The 17 Street bridge was demolished and reconstructed to be twice as wide with two lanes each way. An interchange linking the freeway to 76 Avenue (formerly Highway 14A) was removed. Westbound Sherwood Park Freeway between Anthony Henday Drive and 17 Street was widened to four lanes, while the eastbound direction is now three lanes wide, up from two lanes each way prior to the project. From 17 Street to the western terminus, both directions remain two lanes wide. Work to rehabilitate the 50 Street bridge was also completed in 2016, extending the structure's surface life for an additional 10–15 years.

== Major intersections ==
Sherwood Park Freeway stretches 7.1 km (4.4 mi) from 71 Street in Edmonton to approximately 800 m (2,600 ft) east of Anthony Henday Drive in Sherwood Park. All exits are unnumbered.

Location	km	mi	Destinations	Notes
Edmonton	0.0	0.0	82 (Whyte) Avenue 71 Street	At grade (traffic lights); continues west as 82 Avenue
Edmonton	0.5	0.31	Argyll Road	Y interchange; westbound exit and eastbound entrance
Edmonton	1.4	0.87	50 Street	Diamond interchange
Strathcona County	3.0	1.9	34 Street	Diamond interchange; Edmonton city limits; west end of unsigned Highway 100
Strathcona County	4.7	2.9	17 Street	Diamond interchange
Strathcona County	5.7	3.5	76 Avenue	Former interchange; demolished when Highway 216 interchange was rebuilt
Strathcona County	5.7– 7.1	3.5– 4.4	Anthony Henday Drive (Highway 216) Wye Road – Sherwood Park	Combination interchange; Highway 216 exit 61; east end of unsigned Highway 100; continues east as Wye Road
1.000 mi = 1.609 km; 1.000 km = 0.621 mi: Closed/former; Incomplete access; Route transition
