= Hastings Lake (Alberta) =

Lake in Alberta, Canada

- a-ka-ka-kwa-tikh
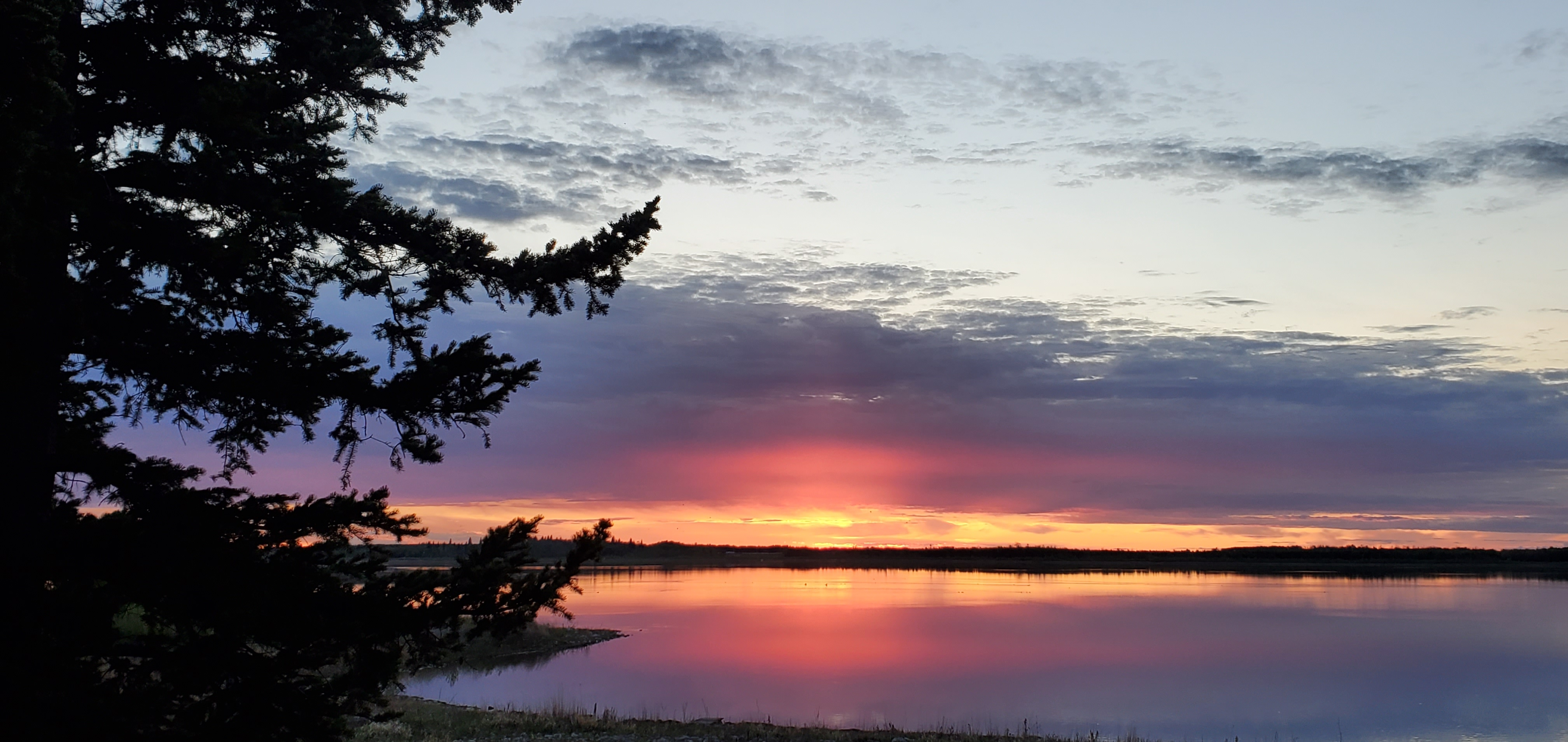

- Location within Alberta Location within Canada
- Location: Strathcona County, Alberta
- Coordinates: 53°25′03″N 112°54′35″W
- Basin countries: Canada
- Max. length: 1.7 km (1.1 mi)
- Max. width: 6 km (3.7 mi)
- Surface area: 8.71 km^{2} (3.36 sq mi)
- Average depth: 2.4 m (7 ft 10 in)
- Max. depth: 7.3 m (24 ft)
- Surface elevation: 738 m (2,421 ft)
- References: Hastings Lake

Hastings Lake is a lake in Alberta, Canada. It is located in Strathcona County, east of Cooking Lake, and 45 minutes east of Edmonton. The hamlet of Hastings Lake is located on the southern shore of the lake.

== Information ==
The lake was named in 1884 for Tom Hastings, a member of Tyrell's geological survey party. The Cree name for the lake was a-ka-ka-kwa-tikh, which means "the lake that does not freeze".

The large forested area in the Hastings Lake watershed is a key area for moose and white-tailed deer. With close proximity to the Cooking Lake-Blackfoot Wildlife, Grazing and Provincial Recreation Area and the Waskahegan Staging Area, many hiking and cross-country skiing possibilities exists.

For many years Hastings Lake has been an attraction for bird enthusiasts as it is home to many species of water birds. The white pelican and the cormorant make it a bird-watching destination. The islands of Hastings Lake were named as one of the "Special Places 2000" by the Alberta Government.

Activities include kayaking, canoeing, paddle boarding, or other water-based activities, or bird hunting.

Hastings Lake has had a religious summer camp located on the southern shore since 1938. Camp options include youth camps, family camps for all ages, day camps, and group rentals.

== Fishing ==
Adult perch were introduced into the lake in 1925, and large numbers of their youth had been observed there by 1928. A stocking program in 1957 introduced 506 adult northern pike and 14,100 adult perch into Hastings Lake.

Yellow perch were stocked in the lake again between 1982 and 1985. Despite the lake's lack of oxygen during the winter months, the fish were able to survive in he lake, in contrast with neighbouring Cooking Lake, where winterkill conditions prevented most fish from surviving.

In 2004, a sampling project recorded fathead minnows and brook sticklebacks in the lake. Neither the previously introduced northern pike or yellow perch appeared in the results. The previously mentioned oxygen depletion issues, particularly toward the bottom of an already shallow lake contributes to the hostile environment.

== See also ==
- List of lakes of Alberta
