= 2022 Alberta municipal censuses =

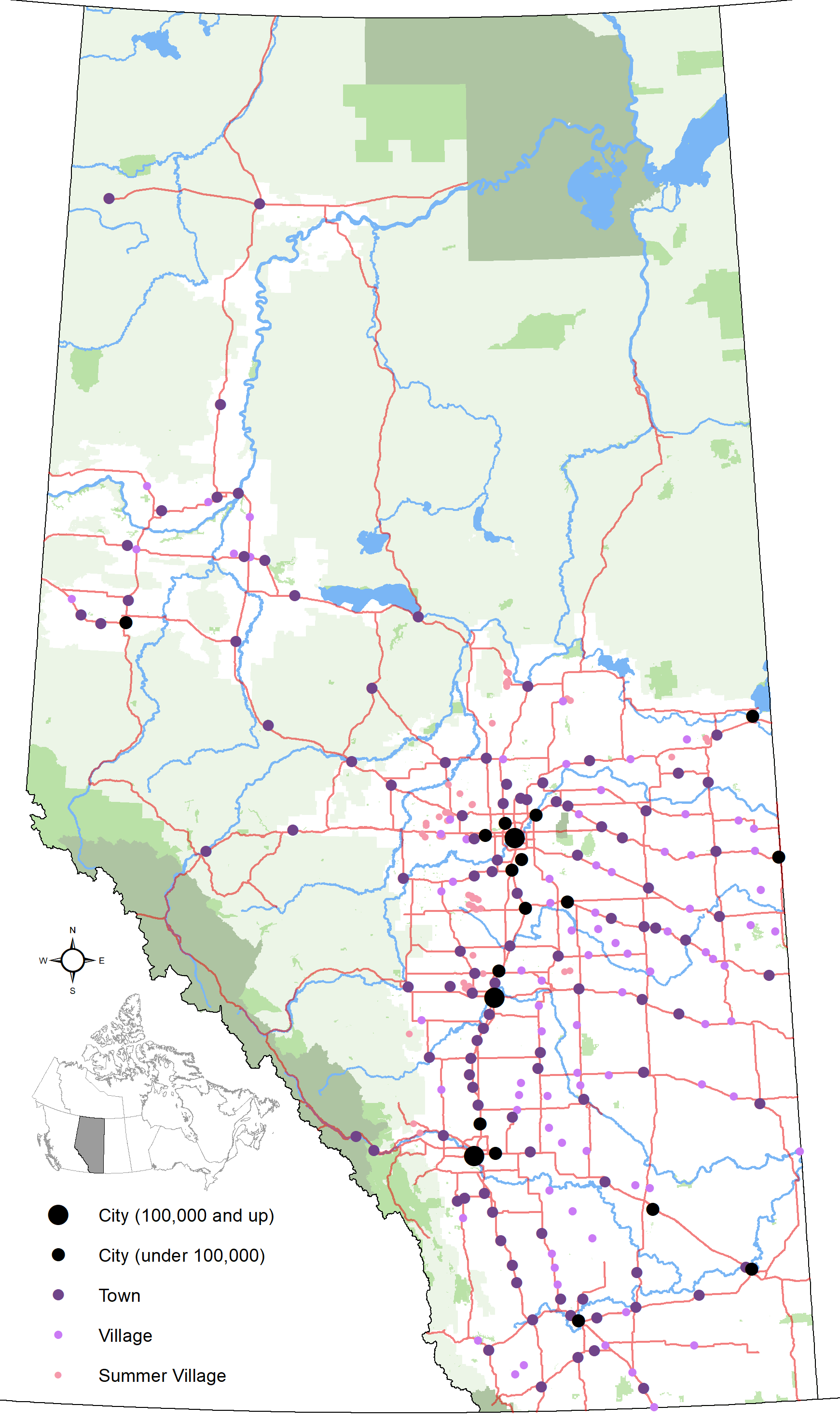
- Distribution of Alberta's 260 urban municipalities

Alberta has provincial legislation allowing its municipalities to conduct municipal censuses. Municipalities choose to conduct their own censuses for multiple reasons such as to better inform municipal service planning and provision or to simply update their populations since the last federal census.

Alberta began the year of 2022 with 343 municipalities. Of these, three municipalities conducted a municipal census in 2022, including the City of Cold Lake, the Town of High Level, and Strathcona County.

Strathcona County became the fifth municipality in Alberta to reach 100,000 people as a result from its 2022 municipal census.

== Municipal census results ==
The following summarizes the results of the three municipal censuses conducted in 2022.

2022 municipal census summary				2021 federal census comparison				Previous municipal census comparison			
Municipality	Status	Census date	2022 pop.	2021 pop.	Absolute growth	Absolute change	Annual growth rate	Prev. pop.	Prev. census year	Absolute growth	Annual growth rate
Cold Lake	City	May 2, 2022	16,302	15,661	641	4.1%	4.1%	15,736	2014	566	0.4%
High Level	Town		unpublished	3,922				3,992	2017		
Strathcona County	Specialized municipality	May 1, 2022	100,362	99,225	1,137	1.1%	1.1%	98,381	2018	1,981	0.5%

== Breakdowns ==
=== Urban and rural service areas ===
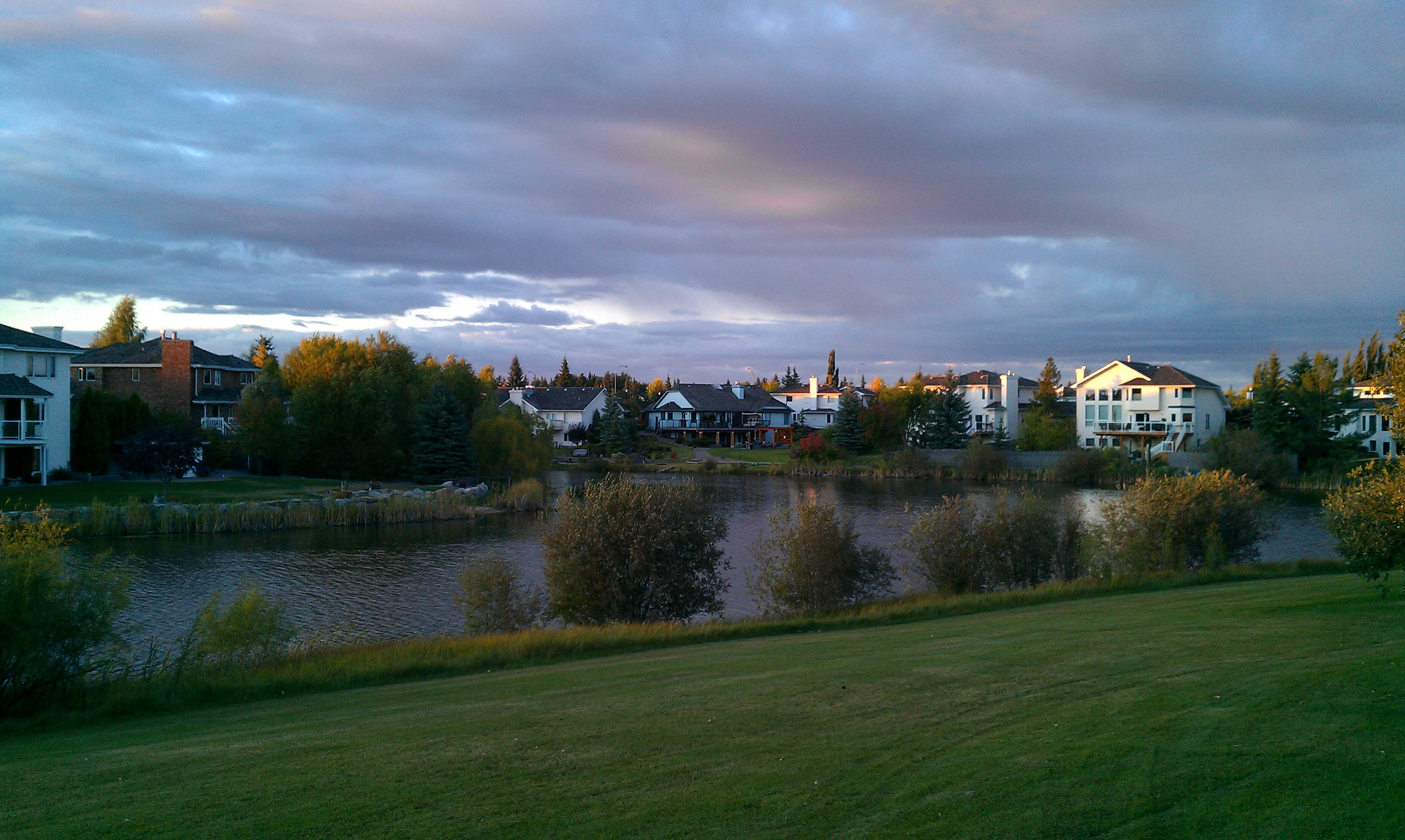
Sherwood Park is an urban service area within Strathcona County.

2022 municipal census summary		2018 municipal census comparison		
Area	2022 population	Previous population	Absolute growth	Annual growth rate
Sherwood Park urban service area (Note: The Sherwood Park urban service area is deemed equivalent to a city.)	73,000	71,332	1,668	0.6%
Rural service area (Note: Strathcona County's rural service area is deemed equivalent to a municipal district.)	27,362	27,049	313	0.3%
Total Strathcona County	100,362	98,381	1,981	0.5%

=== Hamlets ===
The following is a list of hamlet populations determined by the 2022 municipal census conducted by Strathcona County, excluding the Sherwood Park urban service area that is presented above.

2022 municipal census summary			Previous municipal census comparison			
Hamlet	Municipality	2022 population	Previous population	Previous census year	Absolute growth	Annual growth rate
Antler Lake	Strathcona County	428	435	2018	−7	−0.4%
Ardrossan	Strathcona County	919	532	2018	387	14.6%
Collingwood Cove	Strathcona County	375	376	2018	−1	−0.1%
Half Moon Lake	Strathcona County	187	214	2018	−27	−3.3%
Hastings Lake	Strathcona County	102	104	2018	−2	−0.5%
Josephburg	Strathcona County	117	118	2018	−1	−0.2%
North Cooking Lake	Strathcona County	48	57	2018	−9	−4.2%
South Cooking Lake	Strathcona County	277	270	2018	7	0.6%

== See also ==
- List of communities in Alberta
