= Rod Frank =

Canadian politician

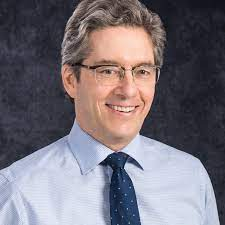
- Mayor Rod Frank in 2021

Mayor of Strathcona County
- Incumbent
- Assumed office October 24, 2017
- Preceded by: Roxanne Carr

Personal details
- Born: 1959 or 1960 (age 66–67) Winnipeg
- Party: Liberal (2015), Independent (2021)
- Spouse: Edith Wimmer-Frank M (1991)
- Children: 2
- Occupation: Politician, Lawyer

Rod Frank is a Canadian politician. He is currently the mayor of Strathcona County, Alberta.

== Background and education ==
Frank moved to Sherwood Park, the largest community in the county, with his family in 1963. He attended the University of Alberta where he received degrees in business and law. Prior to being elected he served as a corporate lawyer for TELUS, headed the Canadian Bar Association's National Competition Law Section, worked as a columnist with the Sherwood Park News, and was the president of the Edmonton Wildcats Junior Football Club.

Frank ran for the Liberal Party of Canada in the 2015 Canadian federal election in the riding of Sherwood Park—Fort Saskatchewan. He lost to Garnett Genuis, winning 20% of the vote. Frank ran as a "social progressive, fiscal conservative". He is currently an Independent.

Frank was elected as mayor of Strathcona County in the 2017 municipal elections, defeating incumbent Roxanne Carr by over 2000 votes. Upon his election, he indicated his first priority would be "developing the upcoming budget and communicating with all residents of the county to hear their concerns". He campaigned on "avoid(ing) raising taxes beyond the rate of inflation," "promoting regional co-operation", "creating an industry-friendly culture at city hall that puts citizens first", and promising to "unleash the power of free enterprise".

Since being elected, one of Frank's challenges has been the loss of food producers in the county. In 2018, Frank witnessed smoke and fire at the Strathcona County Community Centre in the aftermath of an explosion that led to the death of the suspect. In 2020, the Frank-led County Council unanimously voted to reject a plan to integrate the Edmonton region's public transit service.

Through his first term, Frank has advocated for the Alberta energy sector. In 2019, he was quoted when speaking on the TransMountain pipeline, “It has to get built for the good of the country”. “The current situation just isn’t sustainable.”

In 2020, Frank led a push for the Federation of Canadian Municipalities to advocate to the federal government to establish national utility corridors including pipelines from coast to coast to coast, repeal or amend Bill C-48 and establish a federal assessment process on major projects.

Frank was easily re-elected in the 2021 municipal elections, defeating former PC MLA Dave Quest by over 12,000 votes.

In his second term, Frank focused on governance priorities such as municipal services, fiscal management, and job creation. During this period, Strathcona County achieved over 90 percent citizen satisfaction in municipal services, maintained tax increases below the rate of inflation, and implemented measures in crime prevention and services for seniors. Strathcona County council also approved the Agriculture and Food Sector Development Strategy and supported industrial development, particularly in the energy and petrochemical sectors, with $45 billion in investments. Notably, in 2023, Strathcona County secured a $720 million renewable diesel fuel investment from Imperial Oil. Environmental sustainability initiatives included hydrogen fuel investments, emission reduction targets, carbon capture, utilization and storage (CCUS), and co-generation projects. In 2024, Strathcona County's population grew to over 103,000 residents, a 3.5% increase since 2022.

Frank was elected for his third term as Mayor of Strathcona County in the 2025 municipal election, with over 76 per cent of the vote and 15,753 ballots (up from 58 per cent in 2021, 43 per cent in 2017). Frank campaigned on quality municipal services, financial responsibility, sustainability, affordability, investment and job creation..
