= Sherwood Park =

Sherwood Park Campbelltown (1953–1956)
- Urban service area (hamlet)
- Sherwood Park Urban Service Area
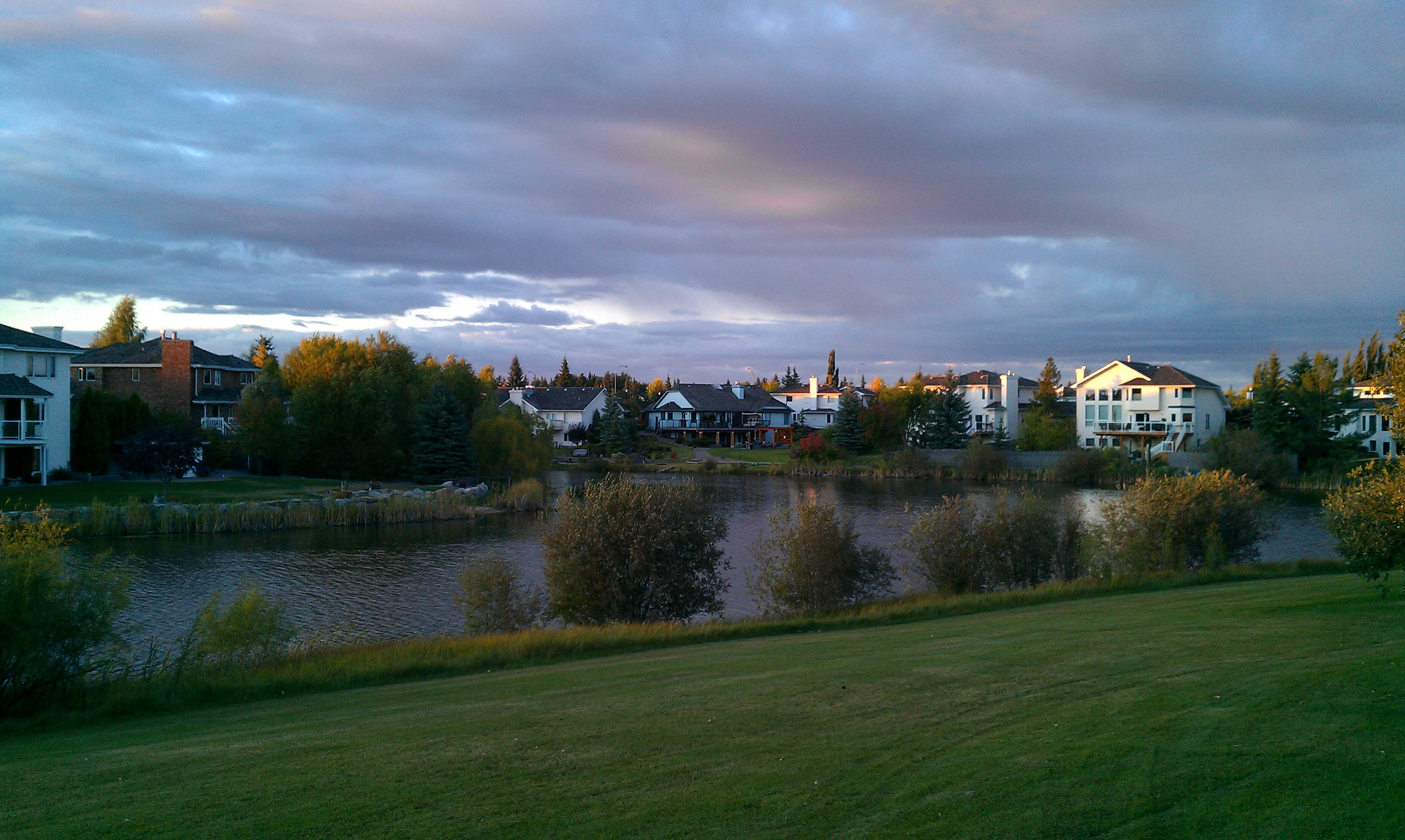

- Location in Strathcona County

- Location within Edmonton Location within Alberta Location within Canada
- Coordinates: 53°31′24″N 113°18′32″W
- Country: Canada
- Province: Alberta
- Region: Edmonton Metropolitan Region
- Census division: 11
- Specialized municipality: Strathcona County
- Founded: 1953
- Name change: 1956

Government
  - Type: Unincorporated
  - Mayor: Rod Frank
  - Governing body: Strathcona County Council: Dave Anderson; Katie Berghofer; Brian Botterill; Linton Delainey; Glen Lawrence; Robert Parks; Paul Smith; Bill Tonita
- Elevation: 729 m (2,392 ft)

Population (2021)
  - Total: 72,017
  - Municipal census (2024): 75,575
- Time zone: UTC−06:00 (Alberta Time)
- Forward sortation areas: T8A - T8H
- Area codes: 780, 587, 825
- Highways: Highway 14, Highway 21, Highway 216, Highway 630
- Website: Strathcona County

Sherwood Park is a large suburban hamlet in Alberta, Canada within Strathcona County that is recognized as an urban service area. It is adjacent to the City of Edmonton's eastern boundary. While long confined to generally south of Highway 16 (Yellowhead Trail), west of Highway 21 and north of Highway 630 (Wye Road), portions of Sherwood Park have expanded beyond Yellowhead Trail and Wye Road since the start of the 21st century. Anthony Henday Drive (Highway 216) separates Refinery Row, in a portion of the Sherwood Park Urban Service Area to the west, from the residential and commercial hamlet to the east.

Sherwood Park was established in 1955 on farmland of the Smeltzer family, east of Edmonton. With a population of 75,575 in 2024, Sherwood Park has enough people to be Alberta's sixth largest city, but it retains the status of a hamlet, though the Government of Alberta officially recognizes the Sherwood Park Urban Service Area as equivalent to a city.

== History ==
In 1881, settlers arrived and started setting up homesteads in the area just north of where Sherwood Park is today.

Sherwood Park was founded as Campbelltown by John Hook Campbell and John Mitchell in 1953 when the Municipal District of Strathcona No. 83 approved their proposed development of a bedroom community east of Edmonton. The first homes within the community were marketed to the public in 1955. Canada Post intervened on the name of Campbelltown due to the existence of several other communities in Canada with the same name, so the community's name was changed to Sherwood Park in 1956.

== Geography ==
The Sherwood Park Urban Service Area is in the Edmonton metropolitan region along the western edge of central Strathcona County adjacent to the City of Edmonton. The majority of the community is bound by Highway 16 (Yellowhead Highway) to the north, Highway 21 to the east, Highway 630 (Wye Road) to the south, and Anthony Henday Drive (Highway 216) to the west. The Refinery Row portion of Sherwood Park is located across Anthony Henday Drive to the west, between Sherwood Park Freeway and Highway 16. Numerous developments fronting the south side of Wye Road, including Wye Gardens, Wye Crossing, Salisbury Village and the Estates of Sherwood Park, are also within the community. Lands north of Highway 16 and south of Township Road 534/Oldman Creek between Range Road 232 (Sherwood Drive) to the west and Highway 21 to the east are also within the Sherwood Park urban service area.

=== Neighbourhoods ===
The industrial area known as Refinery Row is west of Anthony Henday Drive. At least 49 neighbourhoods are located within the portion of the Sherwood Park Urban Service Area east of Anthony Henday Drive.

- Akenside
- Aspen Trails
- Bison Meadows
- Brentwood
- Broadmoor Centre
- Broadmoor Estates
- Broadview Park
- Buckingham Business Park
- Cambrian
- Centennial Park
- Centre in the Park
- Charlton Heights
- Chelsea Heights
- Clarkdale Meadows
- Clover Bar Ranch
- Craigavon
- Davidson Creek
- Durham Town Centre
- Emerald Hills
- Emerald Hills Centre
- Estates of Sherwood Park
- Forrest Greens
- Foxboro
- Foxhaven
- Glen Allan
- Griffon Industrial Park
- Heritage Hills
- Heritage Pointe
- Jubilee Landing
- Lakeland Ridge
- Lakeland Village
- Maplegrove
- Maplewood
- Meadow Hawk
- Mills Haven
- Nottingham
- Regency Park
- Regency Park Estates
- Salisbury Village
- Sherwood Business Park
- Sherwood Heights
- Shivam Park
- Strathcona Centre
- Strathmoor Industrial Park
- Summerwood
- Village on the Lake
- Westboro
- Woodbridge Farms
- Wye Commercial
- Wye Crossing
- Wye Gardens

== Demographics ==
Federal census population history
Year	Pop.	±%
1956	268	—
1961	2,923	+990.7%
1966	6,339	+116.9%
1971	14,282	+125.3%
1976	26,534	+85.8%
1981	29,285	+10.4%
1996	41,989	+43.4%
2001	47,645	+13.5%
2006	56,845	+19.3%
2011	64,733	+13.9%
2016	70,618	+9.1%
2021	72,017	+2.0%
Notes: Sherwood Park was listed under its original name of Campbelltown in the 1956 federal census. Populations from 1986 and 1991 federal censuses are not published by Statistics Canada or Alberta Municipal Affairs. Source: Statistics Canada and Alberta Municipal Affairs

The population of Sherwood Park according to Strathcona County's 2024 municipal census is 75,575, a 3.5% change from its 2022 municipal census population of 73,000.

In the 2021 census conducted by Statistics Canada, Sherwood Park, as Strathcona County's urban service area, had a population of 72,017, a change of 2% from its 2016 population of 70,618.

== Economy ==
Sherwood Park has a strong economy with over $9.0 billion worth of major projects completed, announced, or under construction. As a founding member of Alberta's Industrial Heartland, Strathcona County is home to Canada's largest hydrocarbon refining cluster. A district known as Refinery Row lies west of Sherwood Park and includes some of the largest industrial facilities in Western Canada, including Imperial Oil's Strathcona Refinery.

== Art and culture ==
=== Art ===
Sherwood Park has multiple galleries found within the area, including:

- Gallery @501 - The Strathcona Country Art Gallery@501 provides access to the visuals arts and works to enhance knowledge and appreciation through art education and art practices for the community of Strathcona County. This gallery, centrally located at the Centre in the Park, changes exhibits on a six-week basis and feature local, provincial, and national artists.
- Loft Gallery - Found within the A.J. Ottewell Art Centre, the artwork displayed is the work of Art Society of Strathcona County members. With artwork changing approximately every eight weeks, these local artists and group shows are presented throughout the year.
- Picture This! - This framing company and art gallery have represented over 250 local, national, and international artists for more than 35 years. They feature monthly ongoing art shows and events and also offer seminars to help with art selection.
- Smeltzer House Centre for Visual Arts - Hosted in the hundred year old Smeltzer House, this heritage site is a hub for cultural programs within Strathcona County. From pottery to glass fusing, there are opportunities available for artistic expression for all ages.
- Spark Centre - This performance and event venue hosts art shows and a variety of events, while also being home to the Glen Ronald Gallery. This local artist has captivated international audiences and hosts his works of art within the gallery.

=== Culture ===
Sherwood Park has a history of culture, and maintains those ties through various different outlets:

- Bremner House - This multi-use facility portrays the settlement story of Strathcona County and sheds light on the history of the area through the lives of residents from 1900 to the early 1950s. Annual events hosted here include the Strathcona County Vintage Tractor Association's annual tractor pull in August and Christmas in the Heartland held the last weekend in November.
- Festival Place - This theatre features over 100 professional performances each year. Performances include art events, plays, dance, and music. The Café Patio Series by Qualico Communities takes place from September through June. The Patio Series takes place every Wednesday evening from July to August and presents two acts featuring a variety of genres from local and touring musicians.
- Sherwood Park's Heritage Mile - This open air museum is the preservation of old landmarks from Strathcona County's past including Lord Strathcona, and the Ottewell homestead amongst others.
- Strathcona County Museum and Archives - A museum which features several different exhibits showcasing early life and stories in Strathcona County. All ages are welcome.

== Natural areas ==
Sherwood Park's location within Strathcona County provides easy access to a range of natural areas which serves to create harmony between its citizens and nature as a sustainable community. This includes the UNESCO Beaver Hills Biosphere as well as several provincial parks, trails, and natural areas:

=== Biosphere ===
The Beaver Hills UNESCO Biosphere provides access to explore open spaces, hiking trails, lakes, and campsites for residents and visitors alike. This outdoor area is available in all four seasons to enjoy activities such as camping, hiking, and fishing. Some of the Biosphere destinations include:

- Cooking Lake-Blackfoot Provincial Recreation Area - With almost 85 km (53 mi) of hiking trails from four staging areas, this area has a wide range of habitats which support numerous wildlife species. Active wildlife management programs results in excellent viewing opportunities along the trail systems.
- Elk Island National Park - This park is a destination for day picnics and overnight camping. It is home to Aspen woodlands and prairie meadows, to pockets of wetland. Due to conservation efforts, a wide variety of wildlife resides within the park.
- Ministik Lake Game Bird Sanctuary - Another habitat for wildlife, this 20,000 acres (81 km^{2}) terrain is a protected area for a number of threatened migratory birds including the American white pelican, the great blue heron and the more vulnerable horned grebe . Alongside waterfowl, moose, deer, wolves, and small mammals have all been observed in the sanctuary.

=== Trails and natural areas ===
Sherwood Park has a number of trails and sections, including:

- Parkway Trail System - There are over 135 km (84 mi) of paved trails located in and around Sherwood Park. Whether cycling, running, walking, or in-line skating, there are several points of interest along the trails for visitors and residents to enjoy.
- Sherwood Park Natural Area - A 3 km (1.9 mi) regularly groomed trail with a wildlife-watching platform allows for bird watching and animal spotting. This trail intersects with the Old Edmonton Trail and is easily followed due to plaques marking several of the original survey markers.
- Strathcona Wilderness Centre - This outdoor adventure centre facilitates four season activities such as hiking, disc golf, geocaching, camping, orienteering, and others.

== Tourism and attractions ==
The Activity and Travel Guide has a sampling of the many restaurants, hotels, shops, golf courses, recreation facilities, art galleries and more. At the end of a full day, there are several options available for staying.

== Sports and recreation ==
Recreation facilities within Sherwood Park include the Broadmoor Arena, Glen Allan Recreation Complex, Kinsmen Leisure Centre, Millennium Place, the Randy Rosen Rink at Sherwood Park Arena/Sports Centre and Strathcona Athletic Park as well as a BMX bike park, a BMX bike pump track and a skateboard park. The community also has 37 parks and sportsfields.

An important local sports team is a hockey squad, the Sherwood Park Crusaders, who play in the British Columbia Hockey League. Sherwood Park has a well-respected U18 "AAA" hockey program, dating back to the mid-1970s, that has produced several top calibre players including National Hockey League players Gerald Diduck, Jim Ennis, Tyson Nash, Cam Ward, Daymond Langkow, Brendan Gallagher, Mark Pysyk, Sam Steel and Carter Hart. The Sherwood Park Kings Athletic Club includes levels from U13 to U18 and with the highest level being the U18 "AAA" program.

Sherwood Park is a large football community. At least one Sherwood Park high school football team went to the Alberta provincial final from the 1999 season to the 2007 season. The bantam team, the Sherwood Park Rams, won provincials five of the seven seasons from 2003 to 2009. The 2014 provincial championship was won by the Sherwood Park Wolverines, their first title.

Baseball has become a popular and important sport in the community. In 2008, the Sherwood Park Dukes played their first and only season in Sherwood Park, playing at Centennial Park in the Western Major Baseball League.

Strathcona County hosted the 2007 Western Canada Summer Games with most of the events held in Sherwood Park. The games included 2,300 athletes, coaches, and officials from the four western provinces and three northern territories. Around 2,800 volunteers helped make the games a success.

The Strathcona Druids RFC, a rugby union club, plays its home games at Lynn Davies field. The club was founded in 1960 and has multiple teams including men's and women's 1st and 2nd division as well as youth teams from U5 to U19.

== Government ==
Sherwood Park is governed by the Strathcona County Council. The county's mayor is Rod Frank who replaced Roxanne Carr in the 2017 Strathcona County municipal election.

== Crime ==
According to data collected by the Royal Canadian Mounted Police (RCMP) in 2012, crime in Sherwood Park was on the rise especially impaired driving and domestic violence. Domestic violence reports rose by 32 percent; impaired driving went up 10 percent. Other facts released were that sexual offences went up by 20 percent and drug trafficking charges went up 55 percent. In 2018 the town library was bombed resulting in the death of the suspect and the closure of the library. The reparation costs were estimated at $14M and took six months to complete.

== Education ==
Sherwood Park's school boards are Elk Island Public Schools Regional Division No. 14 (EIPS), Elk Island Catholic Separate Regional Division No. 41 (EICS), and the Conseil Scolaire Centre-Nord (CSCN or the Greater North Central Francophone Education Region No. 2).

The public high schools are Bev Facey Community High School and Salisbury Composite High School, as well as Strathcona Christian Academy (kindergarten to grade 12), and Archbishop Jordan Catholic High School.

Sherwood Park was home to Canada's first charter school: New Horizons Charter School, a public charter school that offers a gifted education program for students from kindergarten to grade 9. It is in Sherwood Park on the edge of the Village on the Lake subdivision.

== Media ==
Sherwood Park's newspaper is the weekly Sherwood Park-Strathcona County News. The Sherwood Park News and Strathcona County This Week newspapers, both owned by Bowes Publishers, in turn part of Sun Media, merged on November 6, 2007, to become Sherwood Park • Strathcona County News.

Due to the community's close proximity to Edmonton, all major Edmonton media, including the daily newspapers (such as the Edmonton Sun and the Edmonton Journal) and radio and TV broadcasters, also serve Sherwood Park and immediate area.

== Notable people ==
- Johnathan Aitken, former National Hockey League (NHL) player
- Kevin Boyer, Olympic skeleton racer
- Sara Canning, actress
- Daniel Carr, NHL player
- Stu Davis, radio and television performer, singer/songwriter
- Blake Dermott, radio personality and former Canadian Football League player
- Gerald Diduck, former NHL player
- Jim Ennis, former NHL player
- Randy Ferbey, curler
- Andrew Ference, former NHL player
- Patrick Gilmore, actor
- Brendan Guhle, former NHL player
- Kaiden Guhle, NHL player
- Carter Hart, NHL player
- Jay Henderson, former NHL player
- Ken Hitchcock, former NHL coach
- Miles Holmwood, musician
- Chuba Hubbard, National Football League player
- Matt Jeneroux, member of Parliament, former MLA
- Kurtis Mantronik, musician and producer
- Ryan McGill, NHL coach and former NHL player
- Tara Nelson, CTV Calgary anchor
- Kaetlyn Osmond, Olympic figure skater
- Mark Pysyk, NHL player
- Sean Rogerson, actor
- Amanda Rummery, Paralympic sprinter
- Duncan Siemens, former NHL player
- Sam Steel, NHL player
- Tony Twist, former NHL player
- Cam Ward, former NHL player
- Tom Wilkinson, former CFL quarterback

== See also ==
- List of communities in Alberta
- List of hamlets in Alberta
- Strathcona County Transit
