= Scotford =

Scotford may refer to:

- Scotford, Alberta, an industrial area in Canada
  - Scotford Upgrader
  - Scotford Cogeneration Plant
- Eloise Scotford (born 1978), Australian academic

== See also ==
- Scotford Frauds, a hoax attributed to James O. Scotford and Daniel E. Soper
