= Sturgeon Refinery =

Bitumen processing facility

- Interactive map of Sturgeon Refinery
- Location: Redwater, Alberta, Alberta, Canada; 53.8388°N 113.1258°W

Refinery details
- Operator: North West Redwater Partnership (NWRP)
- Owners: Canadian Natural Resources 50% Government of Alberta 50%
- Opened: 2017
- Capacity: 80,000 barrels per day (13,000 m^{3}/d)
- No. of employees: 400

The Sturgeon Refinery also NWR Sturgeon Refinery is an 80,000 bbl/d (13,000 m^{3}/d) bitumen refinery built and operated by North West Redwater Partnership (NWRP) in a public-private partnership with the Alberta provincial government. It is located in Sturgeon County northeast of Edmonton, Alberta, in Alberta's Industrial Heartland. The NWRP was originally owned, in equal share, by North West Refining Inc. and Canadian Natural Resources (CNRL); on July 6, 2021, Premier Jason Kenney announced that the province of Alberta had acquired North West Refining Inc.'s equity stake in the NWRP, representing 50% of the $10-billion project, with the other 50% still owned by CNRL.

== Ownership and organization ==
The Sturgeon refinery is owned and operated by the Canadian Natural Resources Ltd. and the Government of Alberta. On July 6, 2021 Premier Jason Kenney announced that the province of Alberta had acquired a 50% "equity stake" in the Sturgeon Refinery through the APMC, which now owns the "stake previously owned by Calgary-based North West Refining Inc." In the Financial Post article reporting the acquisition, the refinery was described as "over-budget and behind-schedule".

Previously, the NWRP/Sturgeon Refinery Contractual and Ownership Structure consisted of three main parties who entered into a public private partnership agreement—Canadian Natural Resources, North West Refining Inc and the Government of Alberta's Crown corporation, Alberta Petroleum Marketing Commission (APMC). According to their agreement as described in the 2018 report by the Office of the Auditor General of Alberta, the APMC—which is responsible for the implementation of Alberta's Bitumen Royalty-in-Kind (BRIK) policy and processing agreements, has a financial obligation to supply 75% of feedstock to the refinery, take on 75% of the funding commitment of toll obligation, and 75% of subordinated debt. The toll obligation which the pays, is a processing fee or toll for each barrel of bitumen refined. This includes an operating toll, a debt toll, an equity toll, and an incentive fee. The original assessment included a capital cost cap of $6.5 billion. In return, APMC can collect Bitumen Royalty-in-Kind (BRIK) when the refinery is fully operational. Under the agreement, Canadian Natural Resources Partnership (CNR), which is 100% owned by Canadian Natural Resources Limited (CNRL), and which has 50% ownership of North West Redwater Partnership (NWRP), provides 25% of feedstock and 25% toll obligation.

North West Refining Inc. owns the other half of North West Redwater Partnership (NWRP) through two subsidiaries—North West Upgrading LP (NWU) and North West Phase One Inc. The North West Redwater Holding Corporation and the NWR Financing Company Lts are both 100% owned by North West Redwater Partnership (NWRP).

A February 2018 report by the Office of the Auditor General of Alberta entitled "APMC Management of Agreement to Process Bitumen at the Sturgeon Refinery", said that the original agreement between the Alberta government and North West Redwater Partnership (NWRP) resulted in the province taking on "many of the risks as if it were building the refinery as a 75 per cent tollpayer in this arrangement". The APMC has only one vote representing 25% of decision-making power in the partnership, while the two private companies together hold 75% of the decision-making power. In contrast, in regards to the $CDN26 billion in toll payments to be made over a thirty-year period APMC is responsible for 75% while CNRL is responsible for the rest. Because of the "unconditional nature of the debt component of the toll payments", a "substantial amount of the risk was transferred to the province" when APMC entered into these agreement.

The AG's report described the arrangement between Alberta's provincial government and the NWRP, as "high-benefit" and "high-risk"—a "$26 billion commitment on behalf of the government to supply bitumen feedstock to the NWR Sturgeon refinery over a thirty year period. (Note: Following the publication of the AOG's February 2018 report, TransCanada cancelled the Energy East Pipeline project which was the second high-benefit, high-risk public private partnership arrangement between the Government of Alberta and the energy industry. See AOG 2018:1) When the Department of Energy and the APMC acknowledged that taking bitumen-in-kind was neither "practical or cost-efficient", the APMC entered into contracts with bitumen suppliers to provide the 75% feedstock to fulfill their commitment to the refinery. In effect, the APMC is purchasing bitumen instead of collecting bitumen-in-kind royalties.

During construction, the APMC CEO and some staff managed the contract itself; NWRP, with its 400 staff members, oversaw the actual construction and "risk management activities". (Note: Richard Masson served as APMC CEO from 2012 until 2017 when Mike Ekelund replaced him. Peter Watson was APMC chair in 2011, Jim Ellis from 2012 until 2014, Grant Sprague from 2014 to 2016 and Coleen Volk from 2016. See OAG 2018:24)

== Alberta’s Industrial Heartland ==
The 2017, Alberta's Industrial Heartland Association's website, listed NWRP's Sturgeon Refiner as one of the major energy projects in the Heartland—"Canada’s largest hydrocarbon processing center" with over forty companies. The Heartland's geographic region encompasses its 5 five municipal partners, the City of Fort Saskatchewan, Lamont County, Strathcona County, Sturgeon County, and the City of Edmonton.

=== Carbon capture and storage (CCS) ===
According to Global News, the $CDN1.2 billion, Alberta Carbon Trunk Line System (ACTL), a 240 kilometres (150 mi) CO_{2}-pipeline which came online on June 2, 2020, is part of NWRP's Sturgeon refinery system. The ACTL is a "major carbon capture project", according to the NWRP, and is the Alberta's "largest carbon capture and storage system". The ACTL, which was partially financed through federal government programs and the Canada Pension Plan Investment Board (CPPIB), is owned and operated by Enhance Energy and Wolf Midstream. (Note: Funding included up to $CDN305 million from CPPIB, $CDN63 million from the "Government of Canada's "Federal EcoETI Program and the Federal Clean Energy Fund Program". Alberta approved "$CDN223 million in "construction funding" through Alberta's Carbon Capture and Storage Funding Act (2009). See Newswire 2018) The ACTL captures carbon dioxide from industrial emitters in the Industrial Heartland region, like the Sturgeon refinery, and transports it to "central and southern Alberta for secure storage" in "aging reservoirs", and enhanced oil recovery (EOR) projects.

== Products ==
According to NWR Sturgeon refinery's website, operations include upgrading bitumen from the Athabasca oil sands into ultra-low-sulfur diesel. Other finished products include "high quality recycled and manufactured diluents" used in the process of extracting bitumen in Alberta, "pure naptha", used in "petrochemical processes or as part of the manufactured diluent pool", "low sulphur" vacuum gas oil (VGO)", that can be used as "intermediate feedstock in refineries", butane, and propane.

== Background ==
The September 18, 2007 Alberta government commissioned report, entitled "Our Fair Share", by the Alberta Royalty Review panel had concluded that bitumen royalty rates and formulas had "not kept pace with changes in the resource base and world energy markets" and as a result, Albertans, who own their natural resources, were not receiving their "fair share" from energy development. In 2008, the global price of oil reached its peak all-time high of $USD145 a barrel, but later in 2008, during the 2008 financial crisis, oil prices had plummeted to $32 a barrel resulting in "the cancellation of many energy projects" in Alberta. (Note: Oil projects that shut down in 2008, had not resumed by 2015)

In response to Review, which the then Progressive Conservative Association of Alberta Premier Ed Stelmach had commissioned, the Alberta government enacted new regulations under the provincial Alberta Mines and Minerals Act at that were identified in the Alberta Royalty Framework.

The 2007 Alberta Royalty Framework identified the need for a Bitumen Royalty-in-Kind (BRIK) option, allowing the government to choose how the Crown could collect its bitumen royalty share of "conventional crude oil production"—in cash or in kind. Through BRIK, the Crown could use its share of bitumen royalties "strategically", to "enhance Alberta’s value-add activities such as upgrading, refining, and petrochemical development", to Alberta's economy, and to hedge risks in the commodity market. Under the new royalty formulas, the government had anticipated revenue of $2 billion annually.

On July 21, 2009 Stelmach's provincial government released a BRIK Request for Proposals (RFP) to "procure a long-term contract to process or purchase a share of royalty volumes of bitumen".

The only proposal was that submitted by North West Upgrading LP (NWU). After receiving a report from the NWU proposal evaluation team in April 2010, which warned that the agreement placed a "disproportionate risk" on Alberta's government, the NWRP and AMPC agreement was signed in February 2011.

A private consortium North West Redwater Partnership (NWRP) was "selected to construct and operate" the Sturgeon Refinery. Originally the estimate for capital costs for the project was $5.7 billion By 2011, the estimate had increased to $6.5 billion.

In 2012, the construction of Phase 1 of the Sturgeon Refinery was sanctioned. In its announcement, NWRP said that the refinery was to be built, owned and operated by NWRP.

Originally, the Sturgeon upgrader was supposed to be fully operational by October 2016.

=== 2014 APMC loan to NWRP ===
In January 2014, under then Premier Jim Prentice, the Building New Petroleum Markets Act was passed, allowing the Minister of Energy to provide loans to projects, like the NWRP's Sturgeon Refinery. When the APMC, the NWU and CNRL reached an amended agreement in April 2014, the APMC providing a $CDN324 million loan to NWRP.

By May 2017, the expected completion date was delayed until June 2018. As a result, the Ministry of Energy updated the estimate for the refinery's capital cost to $9.4 billion. The delay and resulting cost increases represented an additional $CDN95 million loan to NWRP by the APMC.

In 2017, Sturgeon Refinery began producing diesel from synthetic crude upgraded Alberta oilsands feedstock, and by November 2018, was producing about 35,000 to 40,000 barrels per day of diesel. The heavily discounted price of "stranded Alberta heavy oil" resulted in deep discounts for the refineries feedstock—as much as US$30 per barrel less than usual. In 2017, NWRP proceeded with phase one of the refinery capable of upgrading bitumen at a rate of 50,000 barrels a day. with the cost estimated at $CDN9.7 billion.

Because of the onerous obligations under the agreement, in June 2018, the provincial New Democratic Party (NDP) under Premier Rachel Notley, had to begin to pay "75 per cent of the debt-servicing costs related to financing of the project." Even though no revenue had been generated for Alberta by the Sturgeon Refinery, the Alberta Petroleum Marketing Commission (APMC)—a Crown corporation responsible for the "implementation of BRIK policy, processing agreements", had "been making payments averaging $27 million a month related to the financing" the $9.9-billion Sturgeon Refinery, which represents approximately "$466 million in debt-servicing costs" since 2018—tied to the government's "commitments" to the project.

By March 2020, due to start up issues, the refinery was not "processing the government’s bitumen at the facility — or generating revenue for the province from its refining operations" according to a Calgary Herald article. By March 2020, the capital costs of the project had climbed to about $10 billion.

In May 2020, 30 months after its December 2017 startup, North West Refining Inc. founder Ian McGregor announced that the Sturgeon Refinery was fully operational and had reached commercial operations, as the transition from "primarily processing synthetic crude feedstock to bitumen feedstock" had been successful.

Because of the agreement made by the former Progressive Conservative Association of Alberta government with North West Redwater Partnership (NWRP) in 2009, the current United Conservative Party (UCP) provincial government is responsible for continuing the debt-servicing costs that have been paid since June 2018, as well as an added cost of "debt principal repayments of about $21 million a month, on top of the debt-servicing costs," starting in June 2020. This increase in payments comes against the backdrop of the collapse of global oil prices precipitated by interconnecting and unprecedented global events—the 2020 coronavirus pandemic, the COVID-19 recession, the 2020 stock market crash, and the 2020 Russia–Saudi Arabia oil price war, which Premier Jason Kenney called—"the greatest challenge" in Alberta's "modern history, threatening its main industry and wreaking havoc on its finances."

APMC reported in its annual 2020 report on the loans and agreements with NWRP's Sturgeon Refinery project, that the NWRP's Sturgeon Refinery project, had a "negative $CDN2.52 billion net present value" based mainly on "pricing and on-stream factor".

== See also ==
- Husky Lloydminster Refinery, Lloydminster (Husky Energy), 30,000 bbl/d (4,800 m^{3}/d)
- Scotford Upgrader, Strathcona County (Shell Oil Company), 114,000 bbl/d (18,100 m^{3}/d)
- Strathcona Refinery, Strathcona County (Imperial Oil), 191,000 bbl/d (30,400 m^{3}/d)
