= Harvest Operations =

Canadian oil and natural gas company

Harvest Operations Corp.
- Company type: Subsidiary
- Industry: Oil and natural gas
- Founded: Calgary, Alberta, Canada (2002)
- Headquarters: Headquarters in Calgary; oil and gas wells in Alberta and Saskatchewan
- Key people: Jeff Tooth, President & CEO
- Products: Oil and natural gas; royalty trust
- Number of employees: 179 (2008)
- Parent: Korea National Oil Corporation
- Website: www.harvestoperations.com

Harvest Operations Corp. is a Canadian oil and natural gas company based in Calgary, Alberta. Unlike many oil and gas trusts, which consist only of production fields, Harvest had both "upstream" (oil and gas wells) and "downstream" (refining and distilling) components. It operated as an open-ended investment trust in Canada, and was one of the equities known as "Canroys" – short for "Canadian royalty trusts." In 2009 the Korea National Oil Corporation made a buyout offer for Harvest, which was accepted, with shareholder approval. The trust was delisted from the Toronto Stock Exchange and the New York Stock Exchange in December 2009.

The former Harvest Energy Trust's oil fields are mainly in Alberta, with two in Saskatchewan; it also has assets in northern British Columbia known as the Hay River Field. Oil sand deposits and all natural gas properties were in Alberta. As of the end of 2007, Harvest claimed a production of 61,000 BOE/d (barrels or equivalent per day), and a probable lifespan of existing assets of about ten years, before depletion. It claims a total original oil in place (OOIP) amount of 2 billion barrels (320,000,000 m^{3}), and another 1 billion barrels (160,000,000 m^{3}) in oil sands. Future plans include drilling approximately 1,000 new oil and gas wells on about 880,000 acres (3,600 km^{2}) of land which has previously not been developed for oil and gas production.

Harvest Energy Trust was formed in July, 2002. In 2006 it purchased the 115,000 bbl/d (18,300 m^{3}/d) North Atlantic Refinery in Come By Chance, Newfoundland and Labrador from Vitol Refining Group, B.V., and in so doing became the first Canadian energy trust to own its own refinery. Harvest had 924 employees and a market capitalization of US$3.22 billion at the end of 2007. On 22 December 2009, Harvest closed its Plan of Arrangement with the Korea National Oil Corporation, which offered C$10.00 per unit through its Canadian subsidiary, KNOC Canada Ltd. Unitholders received cash payouts in late December, with non-Canadian holders receiving payouts based on the exchange rate as of the date of closing.

The Harvest Energy Trust paid a high dividend, for example yielding an annual rate of 16.0% in early 2008; it also paid out monthly, a relative rarity for equities listed on the New York Stock Exchange. Its dividend payments were not taxed at the regular dividend rate, but rather at a 15% "Qualified Dividends" rate; this is an additional tax advantage in the United States, and applies to many royalty trusts.

== References and notes ==
- Employees approximately 400
