= Arystan oil field =

Oil field in Mangystau, Kazakhstan

Arystan Oil Field
- Country: Kazakhstan
- Region: Mangystau Province
- Offshore/onshore: onshore
- Operator: Korea National Oil Corporation

Field history
- Discovery: 2008
- Start of development: 2008
- Start of production: 2009

Production
- Current production of oil: 1,480 barrels per day (~73,700 t/a)
- Estimated oil in place: 7.89 million tonnes (~ 9.19×10^{6} m^{3} or 57.8 million bbl)

Arystan Oil Field is an oil field located in Mangystau Province, Kazakhstan. It was discovered in 2008 and developed by Korea National Oil Corporation. The oil field is operated and owned by Korea National Oil Corporation. The total proven reserves of the Arystan oil field are around 57.8 million barrels (7.89 million tonnes), and production is centered on 1,480 barrels per day (235 m^{3}/d).
