= Redwater, Alberta =

Redwater
- Town
- Town of Redwater
- Location of Redwater in Alberta
- Coordinates: 53°56′56″N 113°06′24″W
- Country: Canada
- Province: Alberta
- Region: Edmonton Metropolitan Region
- Census division: 11
- Municipal district: Sturgeon County
- Incorporated
  - Village: December 31, 1949
  - Town: December 31, 1950

Government
  - Mayor: Dave McRae
  - Governing body: Redwater Town Council
  - CAO: Ken Van Buul
  - MP: Michael Cooper (Cons - St. Albert—Sturgeon River)
  - MLA: Dale Nally (UCP - Morinville-St. Albert)

Area (2021)
  - Land: 19.93 km^{2} (7.70 sq mi)
- Elevation: 625 m (2,051 ft)

Population (2021)
  - Total: 2,115
  - Density: 106.1/km^{2} (275/sq mi)
- Time zone: UTC−06:00 (Alberta Time)
- Postal code span: T0A 2W0
- Area codes: 780, 587, 825
- Highways: Highway 28, Highway 38, Highway 829
- Waterways: Redwater River
- Website: Official website

Redwater is a town in the Edmonton Metropolitan Region of Alberta, Canada that is surrounded by Sturgeon County. It is located on Highway 38, approximately 52 km (32 mi) north of Edmonton. Its population was 2,053 in the 2016 census, while the town's municipal census conducted in 2012 counted a population of 2,116.

== History ==
In the early 1900s, the area where Redwater stands was settled first by Ukrainian settlers, and followed by English and French settlers. The name Redwater is a reference to the nearby Redwater River, an ochre-coloured tributary that drains into the North Saskatchewan River.

The survey of the Redwater area was registered on September 7, 1906. The original post office, established in 1907 at a location to the east of present-day Redwater, was moved in 1919 to the current town site when Redwater was established as a hamlet. On December 31, 1949 it was incorporated as a village, becoming a town a year later on December 31, 1950.

Originally, Redwater was primarily a farming community. The 1948 discovery of oil in the area transformed the hamlet of about 160 people into a town of 1,306 by 1951.

== Geography ==
Redwater is surrounded by wide, flat expanses of some of the best farming soil in Alberta. Some of the major geographical features in the area are the Sturgeon River which travels roughly east-south-east about 15 kilometres (9.3 mi) south of the town and flows into the North Saskatchewan River. To the east and south-east, there are vast areas of sandy soil known locally as sand hills, some of which support a thriving silica sand and gravel industry. These differing zones support two major types of forest; coniferous, including jack pine, Scots pine, white spruce, black spruce, and some balsam fir; broadleaf trees including birch, poplar and aspen.

== Demographics ==
In the 2021 Census of Population conducted by Statistics Canada, the Town of Redwater had a population of 2,115 living in 910 of its 1,000 total private dwellings, a change of 3% from its 2016 population of 2,053. With a land area of 19.93 km^{2} (7.70 sq mi), it had a population density of 106.1/km^{2} (274.9/sq mi) in 2021.

In the 2016 Census of Population conducted by Statistics Canada, the Town of Redwater recorded a population of 2,053 living in 862 of its 946 total private dwellings, a 7.2% change from its 2011 population of 1,915. With a land area of 20.03 km^{2} (7.73 sq mi), it had a population density of 102.5/km^{2} (265.5/sq mi) in 2016.

The Town of Redwater's 2012 municipal census counted a population of 2,116. The census also counted 921 total dwellings within the town, 77 more than the 844 counted by Statistics Canada in 2011.

== Economy ==
In addition to the farming industry that surrounds the town, numerous large industrial operations are located in the nearby Alberta's Industrial Heartland to the south. The largest industrial operation is the North West Redwater Partnership's (NWRP) Sturgeon Refinery, an 80,000 bbl/d (13,000 m^{3}/d) crude oil upgrader located near Redwater. The Sturgeon Refinery, also known as the NWR Sturgeon Refinery, built, owned and operated by NWRP, under a multi-year agreement with the Alberta provincial government, which has provided multi-billion dollar loans for the operation as well as a 30-year commitment to supplying the refinery with bitumen feed. On their website, NWRP estimated that the economic value of the Sturgeon Refinery to Alberta is about $CDN90 billion over 30 years".

Other notable operations include a fertilizer plant Agrium Inc, a chemical production plant Evonik Industries, a petrochemical plant Pembina, a pipeline storage and shipping facility Access Pipeline INC and the Shell Scotford upgrader and refinery. These industries have spawned an array of offshoot businesses such as shipping, oilfield services, heavy equipment and other support services.

== Attractions ==
Redwater boasts many attractions for a community of its size such as: A nine-hole golf course with grass greens is located within Redwater, a multi use recreational facility Pembina place, an outdoor swimming pool, the sand hills natural area which is home to some of the best ATV trails in central Alberta, a public library, and the world's largest oil derrick.

== Infrastructure ==
=== Health care ===
The town is home to the Redwater Health Centre.

=== Emergency services ===
Redwater has a Royal Canadian Mounted Police detachment, ambulance services and a volunteer fire department.

== Education ==
Schools in Redwater include Ochre Park School and Redwater School; providing instruction for kindergarten through grade 4, and for grades 5 through 12 respectively.

== Media ==
The Review is a local weekly newspaper that serves Redwater.

== Notable people ==
- Todd Fedoruk, professional hockey player

== See also ==
- List of communities in Alberta
- List of towns in Alberta
