= North Atlantic (disambiguation) =

The North Atlantic is the portion of the Atlantic Ocean which lies north of the Equator.

North Atlantic may also refer to:

- North Atlantic Refining, an oil company based in Newfoundland and Labrador, Canada
- North Atlantic Books, a publisher located in Berkeley, California
- North Atlantic mandates, aspect of the Danish electoral system

== See also ==
- North Atlantic Treaty Organization (NATO)
