= Dembicki =

Dembicki is a surname. Notable people with the surname include:

- Geoff Dembicki, Canadian climate journalist and author
- Peter Dembicki (born 1980), Canadian rower
- Stefan Dembicki (1913–1985), French footballer
