= Korea National Oil Corporation =

South Korean oil company

Korea National Oil Corporation 한국석유공사 Hanguk Seogyu Gongsa
- Type: Public
- Industry: Petroleum
- Founded: 1979; 47 years ago
- Headquarters: Ulsan, South Korea
- Area served: Canada; China; Indonesia; Kazakhstan; Nigeria; Uzbekistan; Peru; Russia; South Korea; United Kingdom; Venezuela; Vietnam; Yemen
- Key people: Dong Sub Kim, President and CEO
- Products: Oil, gas
- Revenue: ▼US$2.51 billion (2019)
- Net income: ▼US$80.3 million (2019)
- Total assets: ▼US$16.18 billion (2019)
- Total equity: ▼US$518.4 million (2019)
- Number of employees: 1,272 (2012)
- Parent: Ministry of Trade
- Website: www.knoc.co.kr/ENG/main.jsp

Korea National Oil Corporation (KNOC) is the national oil and gas company of South Korea and one of the most important industrial companies in the country. The company has operated and continues to operate oil and gas fields in Vietnam, Peru, Indonesia, Nigeria, Yemen, Kazakhstan, Russia, China, Canada Venezuela, the United Kingdom and South Korea.

The company has oil reserves of around 600 million barrels (95,000,000 m^{3}) and gas reserves of 10 billion m^{3}.

On 26 September 2008, KNOC signed a deal with the Kurdistan Regional Government where KNOC was granted rights to explore and drill on several sites in the Iraqi Kurdistan in exchange for valuable support on a range of infrastructure projects.

In 2009, the company purchased Harvest Operations for US$1.7 billion, along with its subsidiary North Atlantic Refining and its refinery in Come By Chance, Newfoundland and Labrador. It also assumed Harvest's US$2.2 billion in outstanding debt. The US$3.9 billion bid was one of KNOC's largest deals at the time. That same year, the company acquired a 50% stake in privately held Petro-Tech, an oil firm with offshore assets in Peru.

On 2 July 2010, KNOC confirmed preliminary discussions regarding a US$2.9 billion offer for the entire issued and to-be-issued share capital of Aberdeen-based Dana Petroleum. In September 2010, Dana's management had continued to reject the takeover approach, but 64% of shares had already been bought by KNOC. The takeover was official in October 2010, when KNOC secured 90% of Dana Petroleum's shares by going straight to the shareholders. The action led to the resignment of the chairman and three non-executive directors from the board.
