= Alberta Carbon Trunk Line System =

CO2 pipeline system in Alberta, Canada

The Alberta Carbon Trunk Line System is the largest carbon capture, utilization and storage system in Alberta, Canada. The system, which cost 1.2 billion Canadian dollars, captures carbon dioxide from industrial emitters in the Alberta's Industrial Heartland and transports it to central and southern Alberta for secure storage in depleted oil reservoirs as part of enhanced oil recovery projects. The carbon capture infrastructure, the pipeline itself (called the Alberta Carbon Trunk Line), and the downstream recovery project are each owned by a member of a consortium that includes Wolf Midstream and Enhance Energy, among others. It began operations on June 2, 2020.

== Background ==
The project is the creation of North West Capital Partners Inc. Plans for the pipeline itself began in 2004 but were interrupted by the Great Recession of 2008. However, in September 2010, the Canadian Environmental Assessment Agency approved the project and a license for construction and operation was issued in April 2011. The pipeline was originally planned to start production in 2013 but its construction was delayed repeatedly. Finally, Wolf Midstream built it between 2018 and 2020 and began operations in 2020. It was partially financed through federal programs like the Eco Energy Innovation Initiative and the Clean Energy Fund of Stephen Harper's administration which provided sixty-three million Canadian dollars, the Province of Alberta through its Carbon Capture and Storage Funding Act of 2009 which approved 223 million Canadian dollars, and the Canada Pension Plan Investment Board which provided 305 million Canadian dollars.

== The system ==
The intake part of the system is North West Redwater Partnership's bitumen processing facility whose processes use gasification, and Nutrien's Redwater Fertilizer facility in the Heartland. This generates four thousand tonnes of carbon dioxide per day which is transported through the Alberta Carbon Trunk Line.

The pipeline portion, owned and operated by Wolf Midstream, has the capacity to transport a maximum of 14.6 million tonnes of carbon dioxide annually.

The carbon dioxide's destination is the aging Clive Nisku and Leduc oil field reservoirs, part of Enhance Energy's enhanced oil recovery operation. The Clive Nisku field was discovered in the 1950s and produced about 300 barrels per day at the time the carbon capture system began operation there as the first such system in Alberta. The carbon dioxide, as well as water, is pumped into the natural underground reservoirs that are being emptied of oil. The carbon dioxide mixes with the remaining oil which is produced out of other wells in the same reservoir. Enhance Energy expects to recover 47 million barrels of oil at the Clive field, which represents "between 40 and 50% of the total oil in place.

== Expectations ==
This system is part of a planned project expected to include more sources of and destinations for carbon dioxide. Ambitions are that it will store 14.6 million tonnes (16.1×10^{6} short tons) of carbon dioxide per year, six times more than the Weyburn project in Saskatchewan. Initially, the pipeline transported 4,600–5,100 tonnes (5,100–5,600 short tons) of CO_{2} daily but is hoped to expand to 40,000 tonnes (44,000 short tons) of CO_{2} per day. It is expected to become the world's largest carbon capture, utilization and storage project.
