= Bob Gladney =

Canadian ice hockey player (born 1957)

- Born: August 27, 1957 (age 69) Come By Chance, Newfoundland, Canada
- Height: 5 ft 11 in (180 cm)
- Weight: 185 lb (84 kg; 13 st 3 lb)
- Position: Defence
- Shot: Left
- Played for: Los Angeles Kings; Pittsburgh Penguins
- NHL draft: 24th overall, 1977; Toronto Maple Leafs
- WHA draft: 26th overall, 1977; Cincinnati Stingers
- Playing career: 1974–1984

Robert Lawrence Gladney (born August 27, 1957) is a Canadian former professional ice hockey player. He played 14 games in the National Hockey League for the Los Angeles Kings and Pittsburgh Penguins during the 1982–83 and 1983–84 seasons.

== Career statistics ==
=== Regular season and playoffs ===
| | | | Regular season | | | | | Playoffs |
| Season | Team | League | GP | G | A | Pts | PIM | GP | G | A | Pts | PIM |
|---|---|---|---|---|---|---|---|---|---|---|---|---|
| 1974–75 | Oshawa Generals | OMJHL | 68 | 12 | 50 | 62 | 84 | — | — | — | — | — |
| 1975–76 | Oshawa Generals | OMJHL | 66 | 52 | 78 | 47 | — | — | — | — | — |
| 1976–77 | Oshawa Generals | OMJHL | 54 | 20 | 42 | 62 | 56 | — | — | — | — | — |
| 1977–78 | Saginaw Gears | IHL | 79 | 15 | 50 | 65 | 35 | 5 | 1 | 4 | 5 | 2 |
| 1978–79 | Saginaw Gears | IHL | 67 | 16 | 42 | 58 | 51 | 4 | 2 | 3 | 5 | 2 |
| 1979–80 | New Brunswick Hawks | AHL | 36 | 0 | 6 | 6 | 18 | 10 | 0 | 2 | 2 | 4 |
| 1980–81 | Saginaw Gears | IHL | 78 | 12 | 71 | 83 | 54 | 13 | 3 | 9 | 12 | 12 |
| 1981–82 | New Haven Nighthawks | AHL | 63 | 7 | 26 | 33 | 12 | 4 | 1 | 2 | 3 | 0 |
| 1981–82 | Saginaw Gears | IHL | 17 | 4 | 9 | 13 | 10 | — | — | — | — | — |
| 1982–83 | Los Angeles Kings | NHL | 1 | 0 | 0 | 0 | 2 | — | — | — | — | — |
| 1982–83 | New Haven Nighthawks | AHL | 80 | 19 | 47 | 66 | 22 | 12 | 0 | 7 | 7 | 8 |
| 1983–84 | Pittsburgh Penguins | NHL | 13 | 1 | 5 | 6 | 2 | — | — | — | — | — |
| 1983–84 | Baltimore Skipjacks | AHL | 9 | 4 | 7 | 11 | 10 | — | — | — | — | — |
| AHL totals | | | 178 | 30 | 86 | 116 | 62 | 26 | 1 | 11 | 12 | 12 |
| IHL totals | | | 231 | 47 | 172 | 219 | 150 | 22 | 6 | 16 | 22 | 16 |
| NHL totals | | | 14 | 1 | 5 | 6 | 4 | — | — | — | — | — |
