= Alberta Highway 38 =

Highway in Alberta, Canada

Highway 38

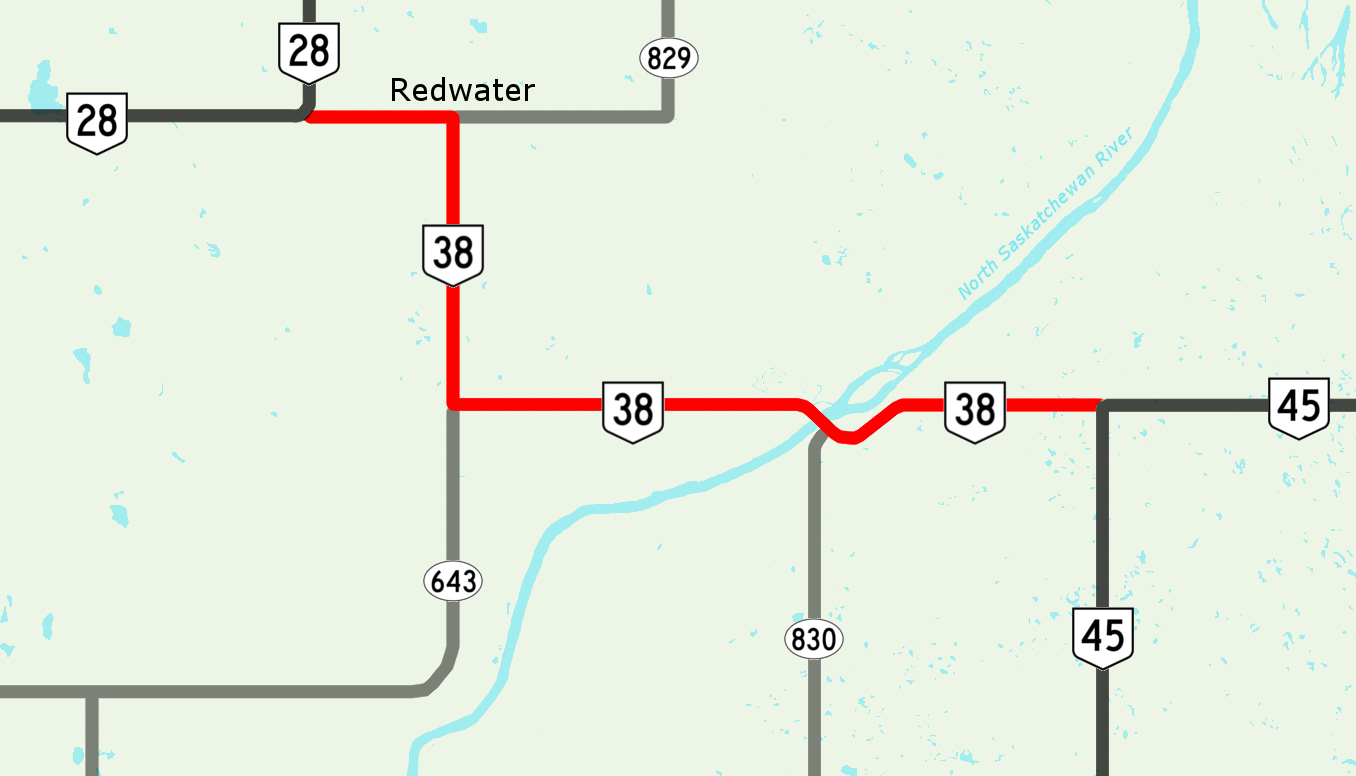
- Highway 38 highlighted in red

Route information
- Maintained by the Ministry of Transportation and Economic Corridors
- Length: 25.9 km (16.1 mi)

Major junctions
- West end: Highway 28 in Redwater
- East end: Highway 45 near Bruderheim

Location
- Country: Canada
- Province: Alberta
- Specialized and rural municipalities: Sturgeon County, Strathcona County, Lamont County
- Towns: Redwater

Highway system
- Alberta Provincial Highway Network; List; Former
← Highway 37	→ Highway 39

Alberta Provincial Highway No. 38, commonly referred to as Highway 38, is a 25 km (16 mi) east–west highway in central Alberta, Canada. It extends from Highway 28 in Redwater to a 'T' junction with Highway 45 north of Bruderheim.

== Major intersections ==
From west to east:

Rural/specialized municipality	Location	km	mi	Destinations	Notes
Redwater		0.0	0.0	Highway 28 – Edmonton, Fort McMurray, Cold Lake	Highway 38 western terminus
Redwater		4.3	2.7	Highway 644 east (48 Avenue) / 44 Street – Radway	
Sturgeon County		10.8	6.7	Highway 643 south – Gibbons	
↑ / ↓		19.1	11.9	Vinca Bridge across North Saskatchewan River	
Strathcona County		19.4	12.1	Highway 830 south – Josephburg	
Lamont County		25.9	16.1	Highway 45 – Two Hills, Bruderheim	Highway 38 eastern terminus; continues as Highway 45 east
1.000 mi = 1.609 km; 1.000 km = 0.621 mi
