= Husky Lloydminster Refinery =

Canadian oil refinery in Alberta, opened 1947

Cenovus Lloydminster Refinery
- Interactive map of Cenovus Lloydminster Refinery
- Location: Lloydminster, Alberta, Canada; 53.2896°N 110.0197°W

Refinery details
- Operator: Cenovus Energy
- Owner: Cenovus Energy
- Opened: 1947
- Capacity: 29,000 barrels per day (4,600 m^{3}/d)
- Refining center: Lloydminster

The Cenovus Lloydminster Refinery, formerly the Husky Lloydminster Refinery, is a 29,000 barrels per day (4,600 m^{3}/d) oil refinery located in the Canadian city of Lloydminster, a border-straddling city incorporated by the provinces of Alberta (west side) and Saskatchewan (east side) as a single city with a single municipal administration. The refinery was built in the Alberta side of Lloydminster in 1947 by Husky Energy, who owned and operated the plant until January 2021, when Husky was purchased by Cenovus Energy.

The refinery provides oil products, primarily 30 different grades of road asphalt 13,400 barrels per day (2,130 m^{3}/d), as well as light and kerosene distillates, atmospheric gas oil, light and heavy vacuum gas oils (VGO). This refinery is Canada's largest asphalt supplier.

The Cenovus Lloydminster Refinery is often confused with the nearby Cenovus Lloydminster Upgrader, which was originally known as the Bi-Provincial Upgrader in recognition of the ownership shares of the governments of Canada (31.7%), Alberta (24.2%) and Saskatchewan (17.5%); later renamed the Husky Lloydminster Upgrader, after the government partners were bought out in 1994 (Canada and Alberta) and 1998 (Saskatchewan). The upgrader was also built by Husky Energy, 5 km (3.1 mi) southwest of the refinery, some 0.7 km (0.4 mi) beyond the Saskatchewan side of Lloydminster, in an industrial complex which includes the Meridian Power Station and the Husky Lloydminster Ethanol Plant.

The asphalt is mined in Geological formation sub-unit Lloydminster Sand of the Mannville Group, a Stratigraphic range in the Western Canadian Sedimentary Basin.

== See also ==
Other refineries in Alberta / Saskatchewan:

- Co-op Refinery Complex
- Scotford Upgrader
- Strathcona Refinery
- Sturgeon Refinery
