= Redwater River (Alberta) =

- Location of mouth

Location
- Country: Canada
- Province: Alberta

Physical characteristics
- Mouth
  - coordinates: 53°53′27″N 112°58′12″W

The Redwater River is located north east of Redwater, Alberta, Canada, and is where the name of the town was derived from. The original settlers noticed the copper tint to the water in the river and named the town as such. The river runs through miles of local farm land and has a bridge for train crossing which is a common point known to many of the locals.

== See also ==
- List of rivers of Alberta
