= Petroleum technician =

A petroleum technician is a professional that has three specializations: petroleum equipment installer, petroleum equipment tester, and petroleum service technician. Work performed within this profession revolves around the petroleum industry, and more specifically with fuel filling and service stations, as well as underground fuel tanks. A petroleum service technician must accompany installers and site system testers during a site's initial start-up and yearly safety and compliance inspections as the installers and testers are not certified to touch any equipment to program dispensers and point of sales, networks, calibrate, and replace or repair for failed components, tanks, and vapor recovery systems.

In Canada, the term used is a "Petroleum Mechanic", broken down into four different specializations: PM1 (servicing and installing of pumps and dispensers), PM2 (servicing and installing underground equipment), PM3 (servicing and installing aboveground storage tanks and associated equipment), PM4 (servicing and installing aboveground storage tanks and equipment with a capacity of less than 5000 L), and lastly a PHM (a Petroleum Mechanics Helper), who has to work under the supervision of a licensed petroleum mechanic.

The key work of a petroleum service technician consists of installing, repairing, and maintaining dispensers, as well as installing and maintaining point of sale systems. Petroleum equipment installer works on the other side of the trade by installing above and underground storage tanks, and all the piping pumping fuel to and from dispensers.

Due to the products handled in the equipment serviced, petroleum technicians must conform to a range of federal, provincial, and municipal regulations in the performance of their tasks. They must have skills and knowledge to maintain a safe work site and prevent any damage to the environment.

This work has been completed on many service stations since the start of gas stations, but only now has this type of work been recognized and transformed into a certified trade.

== Education ==
All manufacturers require training and certification.

- Gilbarco dispenser training is about 20–24 hours online followed by a one-week sit-in course.

"Veeder Root" training is another key certification in the trade.

- Veeder Root is a tank and leak detection system and is used at most gas stations.
- There are four levels of v/r, level 1 is online, 2&3 is a one-week course (certification expires every 2 years), level four is an online renewal.

Various point-of-sales systems certifications such as:

- Verifone Sapphire
- Gilbarco Passport
- Bulloch
- Wayne Nucleus

Weights and Measures Inspector certification

- One must have this certification to perform initial inspections on pumps and dispensers.

Safety certifications

- American Petroleum Institute (API)
- Petroleum Oriented Safety Training (POST)
- Transportation of Dangerous Goods (TDG)
- Confined Space
- First Aid
- Work at Heights
- EWP (Elevated work Platforms)

Government certification web sites

- Government of Canada's Red Seal
- Government of British Columbia's Industry Training Authority
- Government of British Columbia's Construction Industry Training Organisation

Training institution

- The UA Piping Industry College of British Columbia (UAPICBC) offers technical training for this trade, which encompasses both theoretical and technical training, as well as access to government examinations and testing. Prior to January 1, 2012 the UA Piping Industry College of British Columbia did business as the Piping Industry Apprenticeship Board (PIAB).

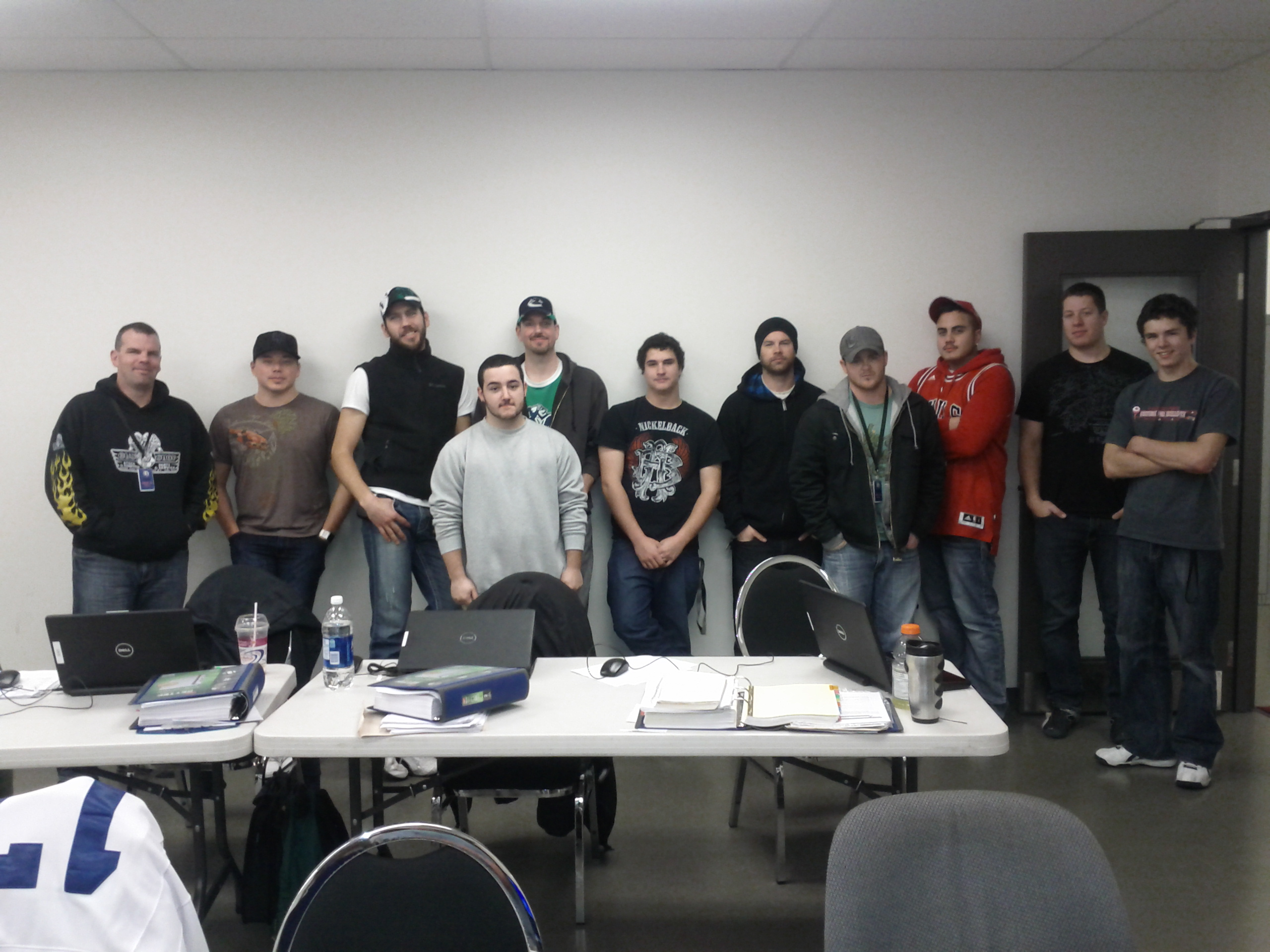
Petroleum Technician Level 1 Class of 2011

Petroleum Mechanic training may be obtained through the Ontario Petroleum Contractors Association or the Canadian Petroleum Contractors Association. The trade is not a Red Seal trade in Canada with each province determining its own standards.

In Ontario, the trade is licensed by the Technical Standard and Safety Authority.

== Safety ==
Safe Work practices: a summary of how and when to perform safe work practices on site and also appropriate certain safe practices in the event of several potential dangers.

- Setting up and maintaining a safe work zone, handling hazardous materials, mitigation of the potential hazards civilian traffic and operators present, recognizing potential dangers, spill suppression, Last Minute Risk Assessment (LMRA), muster points.

Personal protective equipment (PPE): An overview of the requirements and certification on PPE. Specific circumstances under which regular and/or specialized PPE is required and how to use it.

- CSA certified PPE, identification of hazardous circumstances that would either require standard and/or specialized PPE.

Standard PPE consists of (but is not restricted to) Coveralls, Hard Hat, Safety Glasses, Steel Toe Boots, Reflective Vest, Gloves

Specialised PPE consists of (but is not restricted to) dust masks, respirators, Ear Plugs, Hazmat Suits, Fall Protection

Safety devices on site: a list of the stagnant and also functioning devices set in place to prevent, mitigate and/or control hazardous circumstances.

- Fire alarm, fire extinguisher, spill kits, emergency stop, leak detectors, breakaway, shear valves, tank/dispenser monitoring system.

Fire safety: safe practices designed to prevent and/or control an on site fire.

- Trained use of a fire extinguisher, use of spill prevention practices, elemental knowledge of a fire and the circumstantial required actions needed to be taken in the event of.

Safety Requirements & Certification: the specific / non-specific listed safe work training and certification necessary for safe practices in the Petroleum field.

- Post, Fall Protection, Confined Entry, API, First Aid, WHMIS, machinery tickets specific for work to be done (i.e. "forklift ticket"), Fire Extinguisher/Safety training, Transportation of Dangerous Goods (TDG).

Documentation: the required record of pre-shift inspections, accidents and/or injury's.

- Job Safety Analysis (JSA), Near Miss, Confined Entry, WCB forms.

== See also ==
- Petroleum industry in Canada
