= Meridian Power Station =

- Country: Canada
- Location: Wilton No. 472, near Lloydminster, Saskatchewan
- Coordinates: 53°15′34″N 109°57′04″W
- Status: Operational
- Commission date: 1999
- Owners: TransAlta; Husky Energy

Thermal power station
- Primary fuel: Natural gas
- Turbine technology: Steam turbine
- Cogeneration?: Yes

Power generation
- Nameplate capacity: 220 MW

Meridian Power Station is a natural gas-fired station owned by TransAlta and Husky Energy, located just southeast of Lloydminster, Saskatchewan, Canada. The station is operated by TransAlta Cogeneration.

== Description ==
The station is operated as a cogeneration plant supplying electricity to Saskatchewan Grid under contract to SaskPower and steam to the Husky's Lloydminster heavy oil upgrader and the Husky Lloydminster Ethanol Plant.
