= The Petroleum Papers =

2022 non-fiction book by Geoff Dembicki

The Petroleum Papers: Inside the Far-Right Conspiracy to Cover Up Climate Change
- Author: Geoff Dembicki
- Language: English
- Subjects: Climate change, oil companies, politics
- Genre: Nonfiction
- Published: 2022
- Publisher: Greystone Books
- Publication place: Canada
- Pages: 256
- ISBN: 978-1-77164-891-2

The Petroleum Papers is a 2022 non-fiction book by journalist Geoff Dembicki on climate change and the fossil fuel industry.

The book documents that specific oil companies had an early awareness of the relationship between climate change and fossil fuels but then deliberately made efforts to discredit the climate science and prevent government regulation.

Heather Mallick described the book as "the biggest true crime story ever told." The book was one of The Washington Post's 10 best books of 2022 and was shortlisted for the Hilary Weston Writers' Trust Prize for Nonfiction the same year.

== Publication ==
The 256 page book was published in 2022 by Greystone Books. It was written by Canadian investigative journalist Geoff Dembicki.

== Synopsis ==
The Petroleum Papers covers the history of the oil and gas industry in Canada; the warning given to political leaders and oil company executives in 1959 by Edward Teller; and the climate science undertaken by Exxon in the 1970's, when the company measured ocean carbon dioxide levels. Dembicki states that Exxon's scientist James Black warned Exxon's leadership of the dangers to humans posed by fossil fuel and recommended quick action. The author also notes that both Shell and British Petroleum were aware, with the latter producing documentaries that documented the "devastating consequences" of creating more carbon dioxide, including rising sea levels. In addition to studying the impact, oil companies also studied potential solutions, in 1991, Exxon subsidiary Imperial Oil concluded that starting an emissions trading scheme and a carbon tax could help curb climate change.

The book reports that the companies did everything that they could to ensure solutions were not implemented. The book states that funding of front organisations and think tanks by the Koch brothers and others, was done via intermediaries such as the National Association of Manufacturers and the American Petroleum Institute. Strategies to prevent solutions being implemented shifted from discrediting science to greenwashing and also included lobbying against government policy to limit emissions.

Dembicki writes about the 2008 joint television statement by Newt Gingrich and Nancy Pelosi where they agree on the need to take action on climate change, before noting the bipartisan collaboration ending and US public skepticism of climate science. Dembicki attributes the public opinion shift to a well-funded disinformation campaign, and the increasing influence of The Tea Party and Donald Trump.

== Critical reception ==
Richard Schiffman, writing in The Washington Post, described the book as an "essential read" for people interested in the history of climate change. Heather Mallick described Dembicki's storytelling as fascinating, brisk, and masterful and the book as "the biggest true crime story ever told."

The book was shortlisted for the Hilary Weston Writers' Trust Prize for Nonfiction in 2022, and is on The Washington Post's "10 best books of 2022.
