= Husky Lloydminster Ethanol Plant =

Coordinates: 53.261°N 109.951°W

The Husky Lloydminster Ethanol Plant is located in Lloydminster, Saskatchewan, Canada next to the Husky Lloydminster Upgrader and Meridian Power Station. The plant is owned by Husky Energy and produces 130 million litres of ethanol per year. In Canada ethanol is blended into gasoline. The plant feedstock for the facility is non-food feed-grade wheat purchased from local growers; however the plant is also capable of using corn as a feed-stock. The feed-stock is milled, cooked, fermented, distilled and dehydrated resulting in ethanol fuel and the remaining waste material is processed into a high protein feed supplement.

The plant was constructed at a cost of between CA$90–95 million (equivalent to $135–143 million in 2025), and came on line in 2006.
