= Scotford Cogeneration Plant =

Natural gas power station

- Country: Canada
- Location: Strathcona County, near Fort Saskatchewan, Alberta
- Coordinates: 53°48′12″N 113°6′6″W
- Status: Operational
- Commission date: 2003
- Owner: Heartland Generation

Thermal power station
- Primary fuel: Natural gas
- Cogeneration?: Yes

Power generation
- Nameplate capacity: 170 MW

Scotford Cogeneration Plant is a natural gas power station owned by Heartland Generation. The plant is located in Strathcona County, just northeast of Fort Saskatchewan, Alberta, Canada at the Scotford Upgrader site. The plant is primarily used to supply steam and electricity to the Athabasca Oilsands Upgrader (a joint venture between Shell Canada, Chevron Canada Resources Limited and Western Oilsands LP). The Upgrader utilizes two-thirds of the electricity generated with the balance being sold to the Alberta Interconnected Grid.

== Description ==
The plant consists of:

- One GE 7EA gas fired turbine
- One heat recovery steam generator
- One Alstom steam turbine
