= Alberta's Industrial Heartland =

Coordinates: 53.83°N 112.97°W

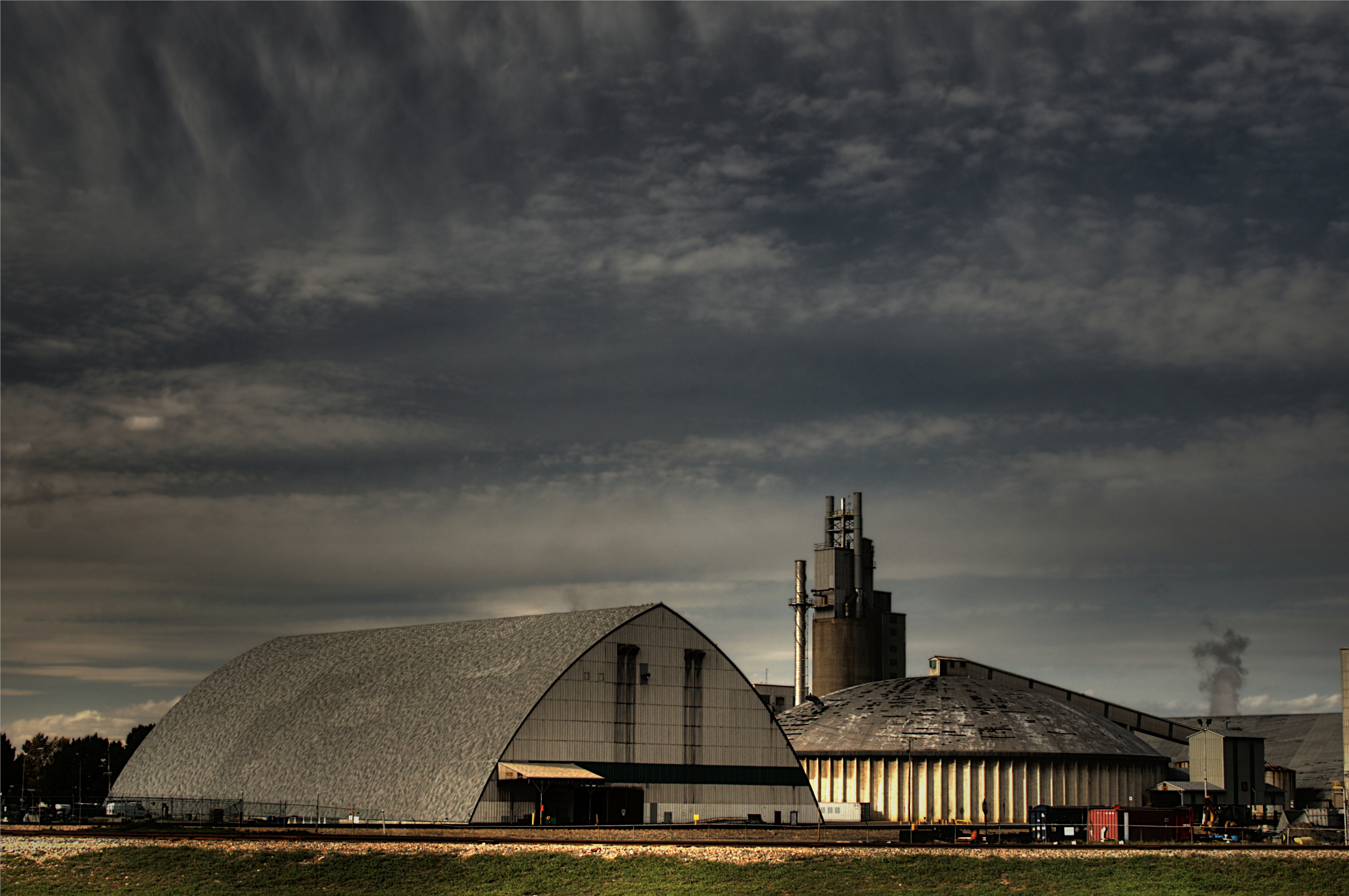
Structures on the grounds of the Sherritt complex in Fort Saskatchewan

Alberta's Industrial Heartland (also known as Upgrader Alley or the Heartland) is the largest industrial area in Western Canada and a joint land-use planning and development initiative between five municipalities in the Edmonton Capital Region to attract investment in the chemical, petrochemical, oil, and gas industries to the region. It is "home to more than 40 petrochemical companies" and is one of Canada's largest petrochemical processing regions." By July 2015 there was $13 billion invested in new industrial projects providing employment for 25,000 in the Alberta's Industrial Heartland.

== Geography ==
Alberta's Industrial Heartland (AIH) comprises 533 km^{2} (206 sq mi) of land split between the City of Fort Saskatchewan, Lamont County, Strathcona County, and Sturgeon County, as well as the 49 km^{2} (19 sq mi) Edmonton Energy and Technology Park in northeast Edmonton. At a total size of 582 km^{2} (225 sq mi), AIH is the largest geographic area in Canada dedicated to hydrocarbon processing. The largest completed project to date is the Scotford Complex, which includes an upgrader, a refinery, and two railyards.

== Membership ==
Alberta's Industrial Heartland Association (AIHA) was founded in 1998 by the City of Fort Saskatchewan, Lamont County, Strathcona County, and Sturgeon County. The City of Edmonton became a member of AIHA in 2010. The nearby towns of Bruderheim, Gibbons and Redwater are associate members of AIHA.

== Refinery Row (Edmonton) ==
Refinery Row refers to the concentration of oil refineries in west Sherwood Park, Strathcona County, Alberta, just east of the city of Edmonton. The two main refineries in Refinery Row are the Strathcona Refinery (Imperial Oil), and the Suncor Edmonton Refinery (Suncor Energy) The other main refineries in the Edmonton area are also in Strathcona County, in a separate concentration around Scotford, Alberta.

== Air quality ==
In response to a request from to the Canadian Press, researchers from the University of California, Irvine released results of new air-quality tests in 2015 from Alberta's Industrial Heartland. The team visited the AIH on July 8 to 12, 2012, their third visit. The peer-reviewed 2013 publication based on samples taken during their 2008 and 2010 visits, "found smog-causing chemicals at levels comparable to — and occasionally many times higher than — some of the world's largest cities and industrial complexes." Although the new tests revealed that the spikes of concentrated toxic plumes were short-lived, Donald Blake remarked that "These are the kinds of numbers we don't see in Los Angeles... If this is something that is blowing at somebody's house, and they're getting five to 20 parts per billion of benzene at them all the time ... that starts to worry me."

Air quality in the Industrial Heartland and surrounding area is monitored by the not-for-profit Fort Air Partnership (FAP), formed in 1997.
