= Geoff Dembicki =

Canadian climate journalist and author

- Education: Carleton University
- Occupation: Journalist
- Employer: The Tyee
- Known for: The Petroleum Papers (2022 book)

Geoff Dembicki is a Canadian climate journalist and author. He wrote the 2017 book Are We Screwed and the 2022 book The Petroleum Papers.

== Early life and education ==
Dembicki is from Alberta. He obtained his bachelor’s degree in journalism from Carleton University in 2008.

== Career ==
Dembicki started his career as climate journalist, in 2009, joining The Tyee as an intern, starting employment there in 2010. His work has been published in Vice News, Rolling Stone, The New York Times, Foreign Policy, The Guardian, Penthouse, The Walrus and The Toronto Star. His Foreign Policy piece The Convenient Disappearance of Climate Change Denial in China Energy won the Energy of Words Media Contest in 2018.

He is the author of two books on climate change: Are We Screwed? and The Petroleum Papers (2022). Are We Screwed? won the Santa Monica Public Library Green Prize for Sustainable Literature in 2018, and the Dave Greber Freelance Writers Book Award for Social Justice Writing in 2017. The Petroleum Papers was shortlisted for the Hilary Weston Writers' Trust Prize for Nonfiction.

== Books ==
- Are We Screwed?, Bloomsbury, 2017
- The Petroleum Papers: Inside the Far-Right Conspiracy to Cover Up Climate Change, Greystone Books, 2022

== Personal life ==
Dembicki is based in Brooklyn, New York.
