= North Atlantic Refining =

Canadian oil company

- Company type: Subsidiary
- Industry: Petroleum refining and marketing
- Founded: 1994
- Headquarters: St. John's, Newfoundland and Labrador
- Website: northatlantic.ca

North Atlantic Refining Ltd. is a petroleum company based in Newfoundland and Labrador, Canada.

== History ==
In August 1994, the Vitol Group purchased the Come By Chance Refinery from Newfoundland Processing Ltd. and the operating company North Atlantic Refining Ltd. was founded.

In October 2006, Harvest Energy Trust purchased North Atlantic Refining for $1.6 billion, and in October 2009, the company was purchased by Korea National Oil Corporation.

In 2014, it was acquired by SilverRange Capital Partners, a New York-based alternative asset manager.

On May 28, 2020, Irving Oil announced that it was in negotiations to purchase the refinery. On October 5, 2020, the sale to Irving Oil collapsed and it was announced that the Come By Chance refinery would close permanently.

In November 2021, the U.S. private equity group Cresta Fund Management purchased a controlling stake of the idling refinery and announced plans to convert the plant to a biofuel operation. As part of the acquisition, the refinery was renamed to Braya Renewable Fuels.
