= Come By Chance, Newfoundland and Labrador =

Come By Chance
- Town
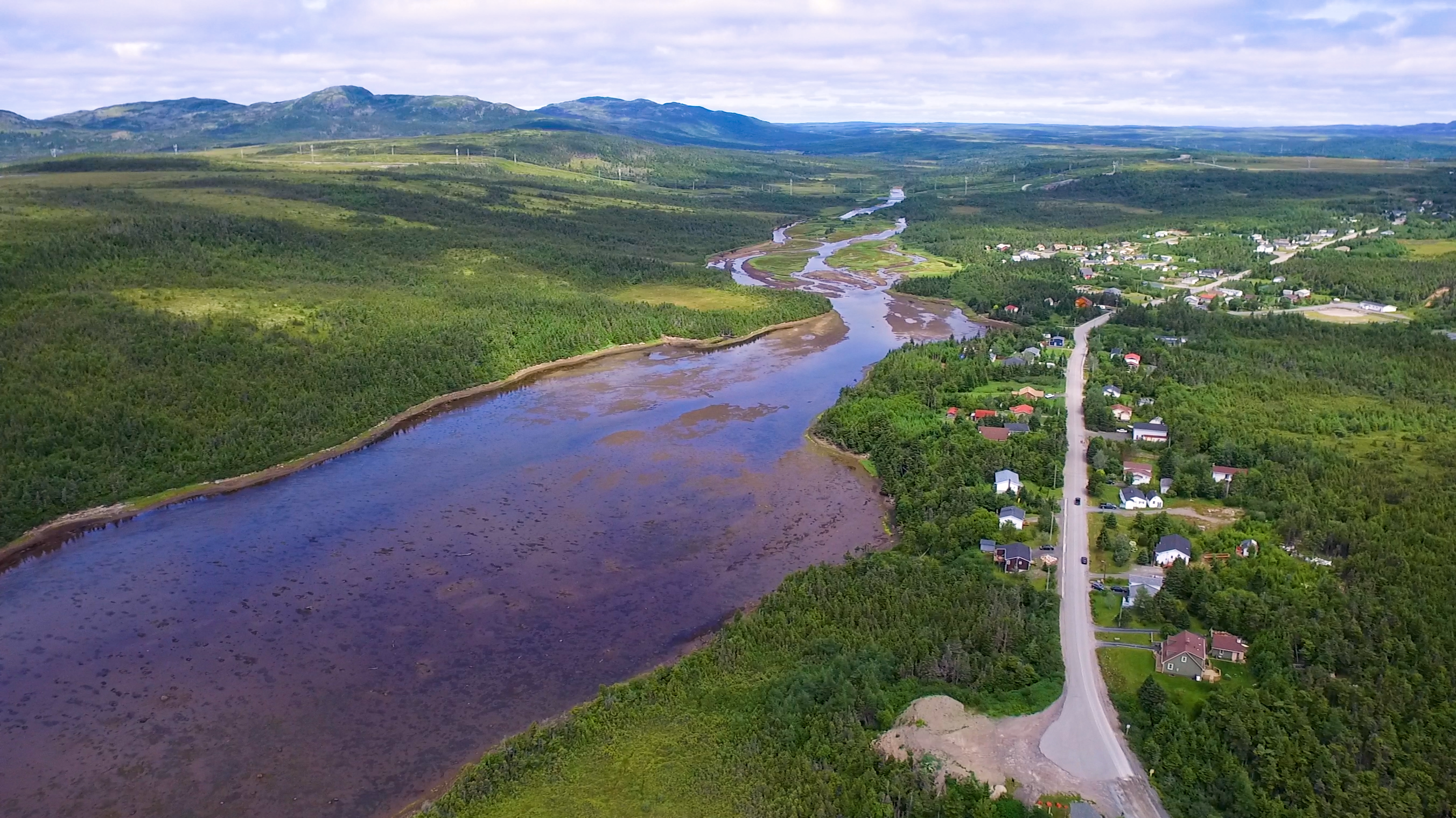

- Location of Come By Chance in Newfoundland
- Coordinates: 47°51′N 53°59′W
- Country: Canada
- Province: Newfoundland and Labrador
- Census division: 1

Area
  - Land: 39.7 km^{2} (15.3 sq mi)

Population (2021)
  - Total: 208
  - Density: 5.74/km^{2} (14.9/sq mi)
- Time zone: UTC-3:30 (Newfoundland Time)
  - Summer (DST): UTC-2:30 (Newfoundland Daylight)
- Area code: 709
- Highways: Route 1 (TCH)

Come By Chance is a town on the isthmus of the Avalon Peninsula in Newfoundland and Labrador, Canada. It is in Division 1 on Placentia Bay.

Located in this town is Newfoundland's only oil refinery, the Come By Chance Refinery operated by North Atlantic Refining, which has a capacity of 130,000 barrels per day (21,000 m^{3}/d). The associated port was Canada's fifth largest port by cargo tonnage loaded and unloaded in 2011. It handled 27.4 million metric tonnes, of which 23.7 million tonnes was crude petroleum.

== History ==
The town's name is believed to be the result of explorers coming upon a Beothuk path by chance, and naming the location after the unexpected discovery.

Come By Chance was chosen as the location for a Canadian cottage hospital in 1936.

In February 2018, a group of oil refinery workers split a Canadian lottery winning of $60,000,000.

== Demographics ==
In the 2021 Census of Population conducted by Statistics Canada, Come By Chance had a population of 208 living in 90 of its 108 total private dwellings, a change of −8.8% from its 2016 population of 228. With a land area of 39.55 km^{2} (15.27 sq mi), it had a population density of 5.3/km^{2} (13.6/sq mi) in 2021.

== Notable people ==
- Bob Gladney, National Hockey League player

== See also ==
- List of cities and towns in Newfoundland and Labrador
