= Strathcona Refinery =

Canadian oil refinery owned by Imperial Oil

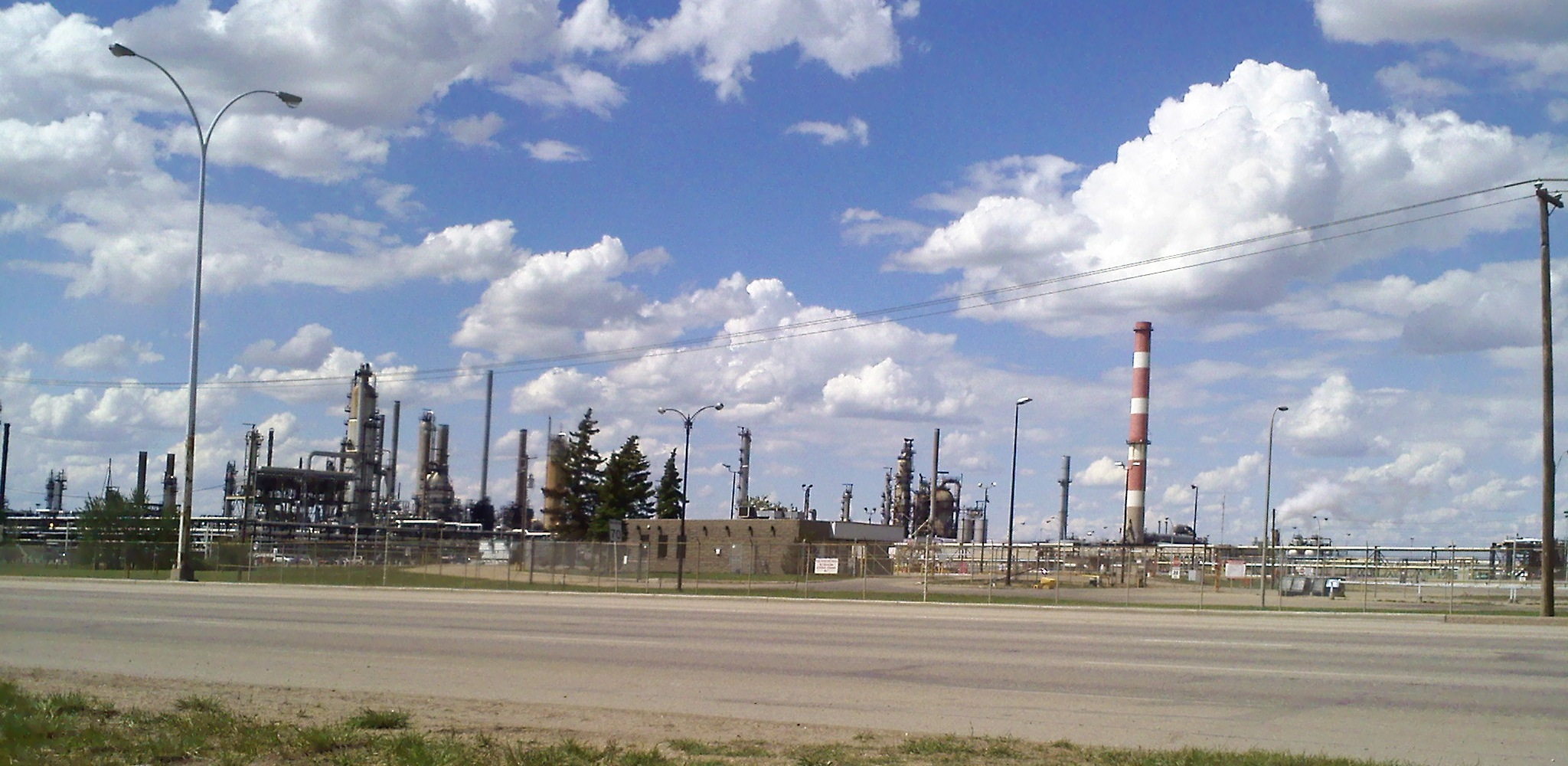
- Interactive map of Strathcona Refinery
- Location: Sherwood Park, Alberta, Canada; 53°32′46″N 113°23′30″W

Refinery details
- Operator: Imperial Oil
- Owner: Imperial Oil
- Opened: 1975
- Capacity: 187,000 barrels per day (29,700 m^{3}/d)
- No. of employees: 450
- Refining center: Refinery Row

The Strathcona Refinery is an oil refinery located in Strathcona County adjacent to Edmonton, Alberta, Canada, owned by Imperial Oil. The refinery provides oil products, primarily gasoline, aviation fuel, diesel, lubricating oils, petroleum waxes, heavy fuel oil and asphalts.

The refinery was built in 1975 and replaced older refineries in Edmonton, Regina, Winnipeg, and Calgary.

A fire occurred at the refinery in 2007 that resulted it in temporarily operating at reduced capacity.

== Avgas contamination ==
On February 15, 2018 Imperial Oil Limited the Canadian subsidiary of U.S. petroleum company ExxonMobil and sole producer of Avgas in Canada announced that it had notified Transport Canada that it was immediately ceasing all production of AVGas produced at the Strathcona Refinery due to quality issues, specifically that "the product quality issue may cause interference with on-board fuel gauge sensors of aircraft using avgas." Imperial also sent out warnings to airport FBOs about the quality issues and ordered that all sales of Avgas since December 28, 2017 be stopped and the fuel in question be quarantined until Imperial can make arrangements to have the fuel returned to the refinery. As a result many small aircraft have been left stranded at airports across Canada until fuel supplies from neighboring U.S. can be delivered.

== Refinery units ==
Refinery unit capacities as of 2018

Unit	Capacity in bpcd
Atmospheric Distillation Unit	189,000
Vacuum Distillation Unit	69,000
FCC Unit	64,500
Naphtha Reformer	21,000
Gasoline Desulphurization Hydrotreater	30,500
ULSD Hydrotreater	78,500
Other Hydrotrreating	52,000
Alkylation	15,500
C4 Isomerization	6,500
H2 SMR Production mmscf/d	20.0
Lubes	3,000
Sulfur mt/d	49

== See also ==
- Husky Lloydminster Refinery, Lloydminster (Husky Energy), 30,000 bbl/d (4,800 m^{3}/d)
- Scotford Upgrader, Strathcona County (Shell Oil Company), 114,000 bbl/d (18,100 m^{3}/d)
- Strathcona Refinery, Strathcona County (Imperial Oil), 191,000 bbl/d (30,400 m^{3}/d)
- Sturgeon Refinery, Sturgeon County (North West Redwater Partnership — Canadian Natural Resources and North West Refineries), 80,000 bbl/d (13,000 m^{3}/d)
