= Scotford Upgrader =

Bitumen processing facility

Coordinates: 53°48′14″N 113°06′00″W

The Shell Scotford Upgrader is an oilsand upgrader, a facility which processes crude bitumen from oil sands into a wide range of synthetic crude oils. The upgrader is owned by Athabasca Oil Sands Project (AOSP), a joint venture of Shell Canada Energy (60%), Marathon Oil Sands L.P. (20%) and Chevron Canada Limited (20%). The facility is located in the industrial development of Scotford, in Strathcona County, just to the northeast of Fort Saskatchewan, Alberta in the Edmonton Capital Region.

== Shell Scotford Complex ==
The Scotford Upgrader is a part of a larger site known as the Shell Scotford Complex (Shell Scotford) located 40 km northeast of Edmonton, Alberta. Shell Scotford comprises three operating units: the Scotford Upgrader, the 100,000 bbl/d (16,000 m^{3}/d) Scotford Refinery, and a Chemical plant. The Scotford Cogeneration Plant is also located on the site. Currently, work is being done on the first Upgrader expansion. In 1984, Shell opened both the Refinery and Chemical plant on the Scotford site. As one of North America's most modern and efficient refineries, the Scotford Refinery was the first to exclusively process synthetic crude oil from Alberta’s oil sands. Benzene that is produced during the refining process is sent to the adjacent Chemical plant and is used in the production of Styrene Monomer, a chemical needed to make many of the hard plastics people use daily. In 2000, a glycol plant was opened at Scotford Chemicals. Much of the output of the Scotford Upgrader is sold to the Scotford Refinery. Both light and heavy crudes are also sold to Shell's Sarnia Refinery in Ontario. The rest of the synthetic crude is sold to the general marketplace and shipped by pipeline.

== History of Scotford ==
In 1891, a group of immigrants from Galicia, Austria settled on the land south of the North Saskatchewan River, near the South Victoria Trail. Philip Krebs, along with his son John, settled on the north side of South Victoria Trail. Their home became a popular stopping place for those travelling along the trail. Besides being a hospitable natured man, John was fluent in four European languages (German, English, Polish, and Ukrainian) and could speak Cree - making him popular with those who stopped by.

When the Canadian Northern Railway was being built into Fort Saskatchewan, Krebs' homestead was a natural place for a stop. In 1905, a loading station and grain elevator were erected there, and on the siding of the two structures was the name "Scotford" (named after Walter Scott and Alexander Rutherford, the premiers of the two provinces – Saskatchewan and Alberta - that were formed that same year). The area is still referred to by that name.

== Description ==
The Scotford Upgrader has a rated processing capacity of 255,000 barrels per day (40,500 m^{3}/d). It was shut down after being damaged in a fire 19 November 2007. The production was resumed in December 2007.

The facility uses hydrogen addition to convert the bitumen from CNRL's Muskeg River Mine in the Athabasca oil sands into refinery-ready sweet, light crude oil. The Muskeg River Mine is the first commercial unit using Shell's Enhance froth treatment technology — a process for removing sand, fine clay and water from oil sands froth to make clean bitumen suitable for upgrading via hydrogen addition.

According to Shell, the hydrogenation process is well suited to the very clean bitumen produced at the Muskeg River Mine, and results in the upgrader producing more light crude oil than it inputs in the form of heavy bitumen. It also produces lower levels of sulfur dioxide emissions than the alternative coking method which removes carbon to produce petroleum coke as a by-product. The Scotford Upgrader has its own hydrogen manufacturing unit and produces most of the hydrogen required for the hydrogen-addition process.

The Scotford Upgrader capacity was expanded by 100,000 bbl/d (16,000 m^{3}/d) in March 2010, an increase of 60% in capacity. In May 2007, the US$9 billion to US$11.3 billion expansion contract was awarded to TIC, Bantrel Constructors, PCL & KBR. KBR built 160 modules and performed construction work for the Atmospheric and Vacuum (A&V) unit and Sulphur Recovery Unit (SRU). Bantrel completed the tank farm, Utilities, Waterblock and Flare units, PCL completed the Residue Hydroconversion Complex (RHC) and TIC constructed the Hydrogen Manufacturing Unit (HMU) .

== See also ==
- Alberta's Industrial Heartland
- Albian Sands
- Husky Lloydminster Refinery, Lloydminster (Husky Energy), 30,000 bbl/d (4,800 m^{3}/d)
- Strathcona Refinery, Strathcona County (Imperial Oil), 191,000 bbl/d (30,400 m^{3}/d)
- Sturgeon Refinery, Sturgeon County (North West Redwater Partnership — Canadian Natural Resources and North West Refineries), 80,000 bbl/d (13,000 m^{3}/d)
