= Come By Chance Refinery =

Canadian diesel refinery

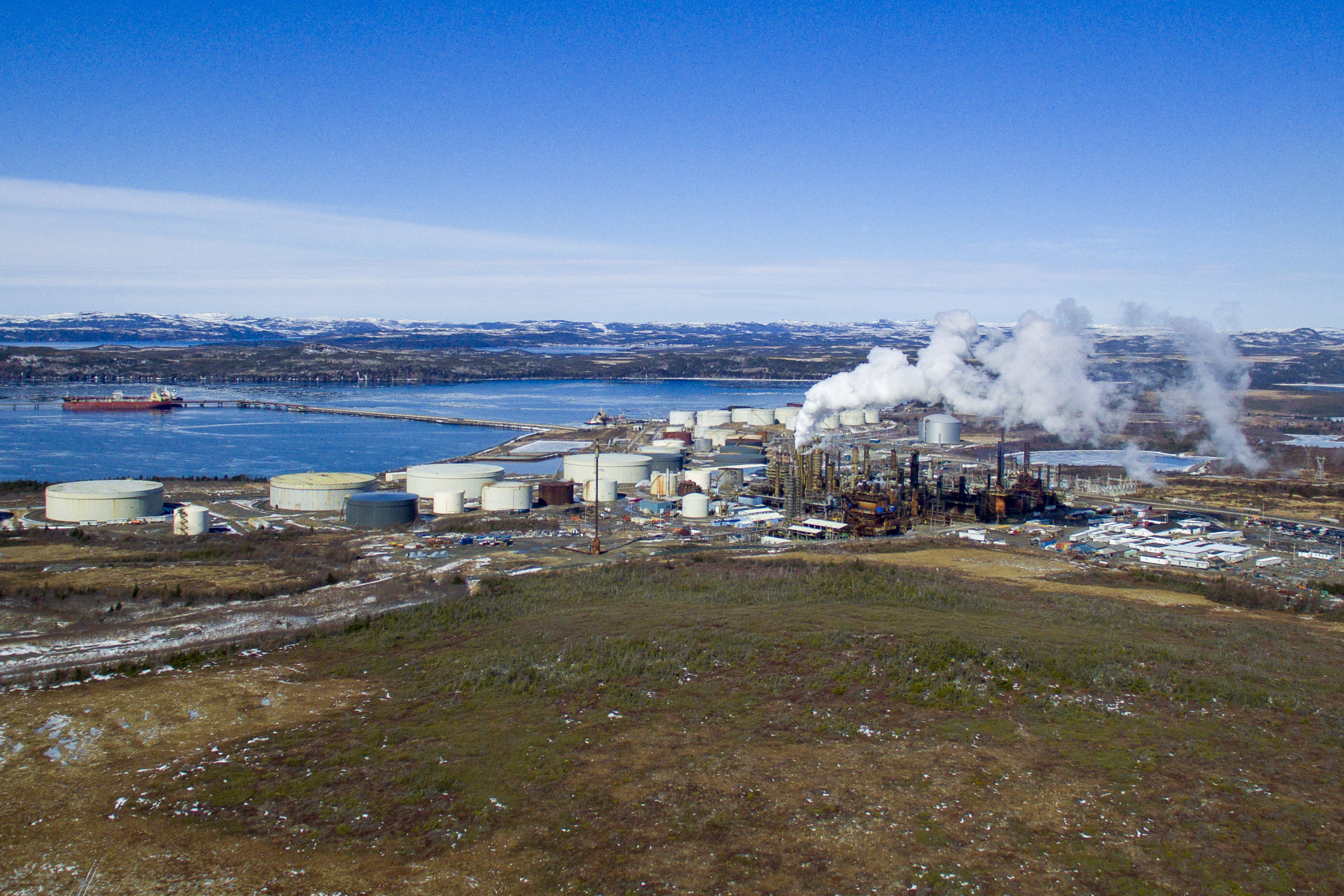
- Come by Chance Refinery

- Location of Come By Chance Refinery in Newfoundland and Labrador
- Location: Come By Chance, Newfoundland and Labrador, Canada; 47°47′57″N 53°59′45″W

Refinery details
- Operator: Braya Renewable Fuels
- Owner: Cresta Fund Management
- Opened: 1973
- Capacity: 18,000 barrels per day (2,900 m^{3}/d)
- No. of employees: 230
- Refining units: alkylation, isomerisation, distillation of crude oil, hydrocracking, reforming catalytic, cracking catalytic, desulphuration
- No. of oil tanks: 50

Come By Chance Refinery is a renewable diesel refinery operated by Braya Renewable Fuels in Come By Chance, Newfoundland and Labrador, Canada. It has a refining capacity of 18,000 barrels per day (2,900 m^{3}/d).

== History ==
The refinery was built by John Shaheen's Shaheen Resources from 1971 to 1973, with the help of British company Procon Limited, for $155 million. The refinery began operation in December 1973 until the refinery went bankrupt in 1976, with Shaheen Resources owing about $500 million. After four years of inactivity, the refinery was purchased by Petro-Canada for $10 million in 1980. Petro-Canada decided against reactivation. Instead, the company sold the refinery to Bermuda-based refinery Newfoundland Processing Ltd. for $1 in 1986, which reopened it the following year.

In August 1994, the Vitol Group purchased the refinery and the operating company North Atlantic Refining was founded. In 2014, it was acquired by SilverRange Capital Partners, a New York-based alternative asset manager. On May 28, 2020, Irving Oil announced that it was in negotiations to purchase the refinery. On October 5, 2020, the sale to Irving Oil collapsed and it was announced that the Come By Chance refinery would close permanently.

In November 2021, the U.S. private equity group Cresta Fund Management purchased a controlling stake of the idling refinery and announced plans to convert the plant to a biofuel operation. As part of the acquisition, the refinery was renamed to Braya Renewable Fuels.

On September 2, 2022, an explosion at the refinery injured eight workers, one of whom, Shawn Peddle of Clarenville (formerly of Hatchet Cove) died in hospital on October 15. Occupational Health & Safety charges were later laid against both Braya and a contractor.

In late August, 2023, the Government of Newfoundland & Labrador awarded exclusive rights to pursue development of the Toqlukuti'k Wind and Hydrogen Ltd. Project to Braya partner ABO Wind. Braya had previously issued an exclusive letter of support to ABO Wind for the joint development of green hydrogen production at its refinery in Come By Chance. The Crown lands decision awarded ABO Wind exclusive rights to 267,000 acres, or 417 square miles, near to the refinery.

In February 2024, the refinery started production of renewable diesel, with production expected to ramp up to 18,000 bpd. However, by December of the same year, Braya was contemplating a temporary shutdown of the refinery due to tight margins and the expiration of the Blenders Tax Credit in the United States. The shutdown took effect in January 2025.
