= Ken Johnston (Alberta politician) =

Canadian politician (born 1954)

Mayor of Red Deer, Alberta
- In office October 25, 2021 – November 3, 2025
- Preceded by: Tara Veer
- Succeeded by: Cindy Jefferies

Personal details
- Born: Kenneth Charles Johnston; 1954 Newfoundland
- Spouse(s): Isabelle (m. 1978; died 2017); Carolyn (m. 2023)
- Children: 2
- Occupation: Bank manager

Kenneth Charles Johnston (born c. 1954) is a Canadian politician. He served as the mayor of Red Deer, Alberta from 2021 to 2025.

== Early life ==
Originally from Newfoundland, Johnston moved to Alberta in 1980.

Before entering politics, Johnston worked for 40 years as a personal financial planner with Scotiabank. He is the past president of the Red Deer Rotary Club. He was transferred from a Scotiabank branch in Drumheller to Red Deer in 1996, and has lived there ever since.

== Electoral career ==
In May 2013, Johnston announced he was running for a seat on Red Deer City Council in the October 2013 Red Deer municipal election. Johnston was elected to the eight-seat body, winning over 7,000 votes, finishing sixth in the at-large race. During his first term as councillor, Johnston cited the economic downturn that the province had in 2015 was one of the council's greatest challenges.

Johnston ran for re-election to council in the 2017 elections, promising to focus on community safety, policing and hospital expansion if elected. He was re-elected, finishing sixth again, winning another 7,000 votes.

While on council, he was one of the few members who opposed shutting down the Cannery Row homeless shelter without an alternative in place.

Following the decision of mayor Tara Veer not to run for re-election, in August 2021 Johnston announced he was going run for city's top job in the 2021 municipal elections, stating that "its critical... that we have a mayor who has proven leadership in the community, in professional life, and the administrative life at city hall... who can lead, collaborate and serve with a dynamic council team toward a greater Red Deer". He stated his platform would highlight economic recovery, community safety, crime prevention, fiscal management, stronger neighbourhoods, regional partnership and health care equity advocacy. Johnston was elected as mayor of Red Deer on election day in a landslide. One of his opponents suggested Johnston was elected because the vote was split among Johnston's more conservative challengers, though Johnston won a majority of the vote. Following his election, he stated his main priority would be "addressing downtown revitalization, including the social housing/homelessness crisis".

As mayor, he continued to call on the provincial government for the expansion of the Red Deer Regional Hospital in the wake of the death of a patient who was waiting in the emergency room there.

In 2024, Johnston stated he was opposed to the provincial government's proposal to allow for political parties at the municipal level.

In January 2025, Johnston announced he was not running for re-election in the 2025 election. He cited "securing $1.8 billion in improvements to the Red Deer Regional Hospital Centre" as one of his main accomplishments.

== Personal life ==
While serving as mayor, Johnston married his former sister-in-law Carolyn in a backyard ceremony in August 2023. Carolyn was previously married to Johnston's brother, who had died in 2016.
