= Morris Flewwelling =

Canadian politician

Morris Flewwelling CM AOE
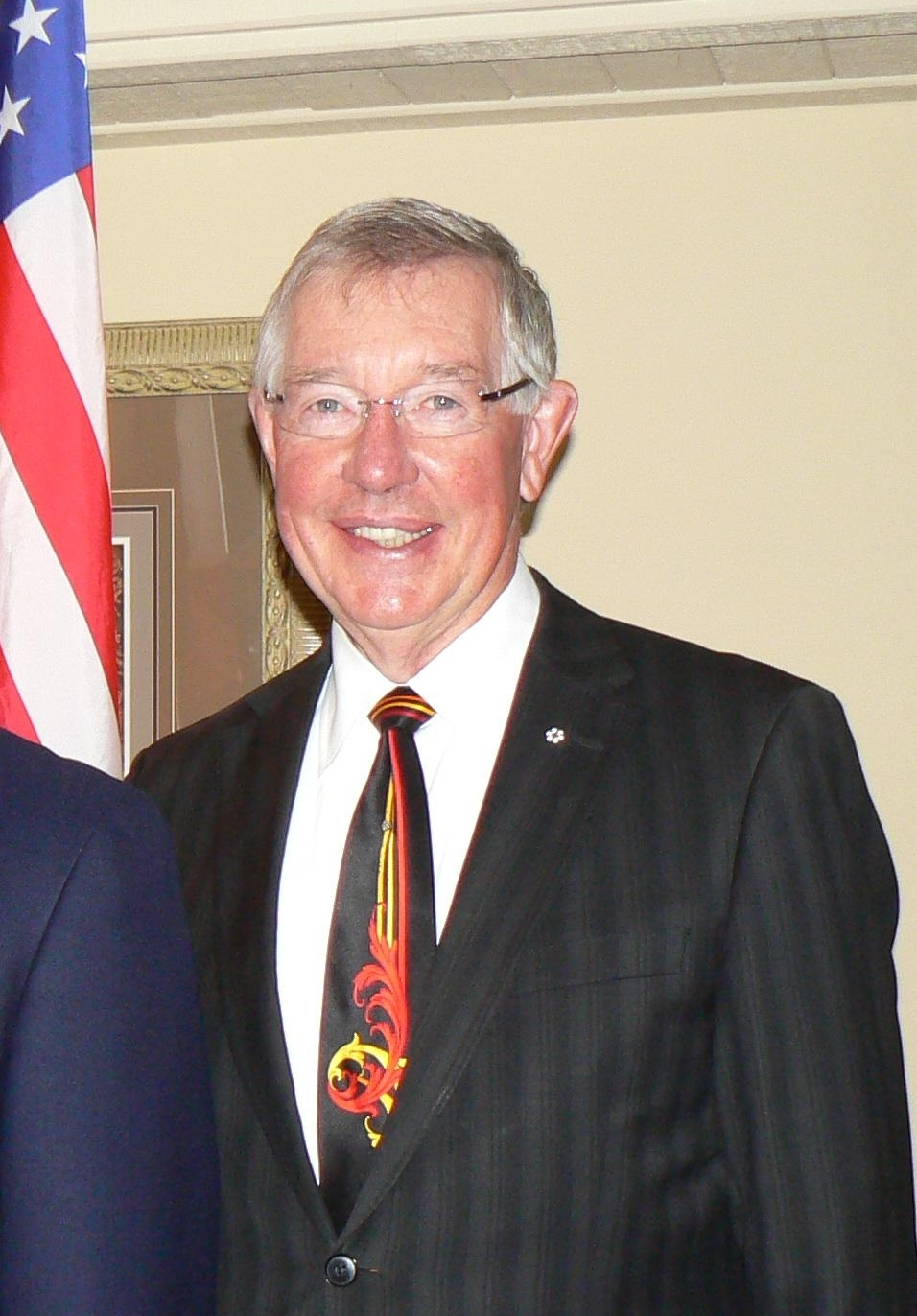

24th Mayor of Red Deer, Alberta
- In office October 26, 2004 – October 29, 2013
- Preceded by: Gail Surkan
- Succeeded by: Tara Veer

Personal details
- Born: Francis Morris Flewwelling; June 2, 1941 (age 84) Mirror, Alberta, Canada
- Spouse: Hazel Waldburger (m. 1968)
- Children: 2
- Education: University of Alberta (BEd)

Morris Flewwelling CM AOE (born June 2, 1941) was the mayor of the City of Red Deer, Alberta, from 2004 to 2013. He was a long time alderman on Red Deer City Council prior to being elected mayor.
