= 2017 Alberta municipal elections =

- October 16, 2017
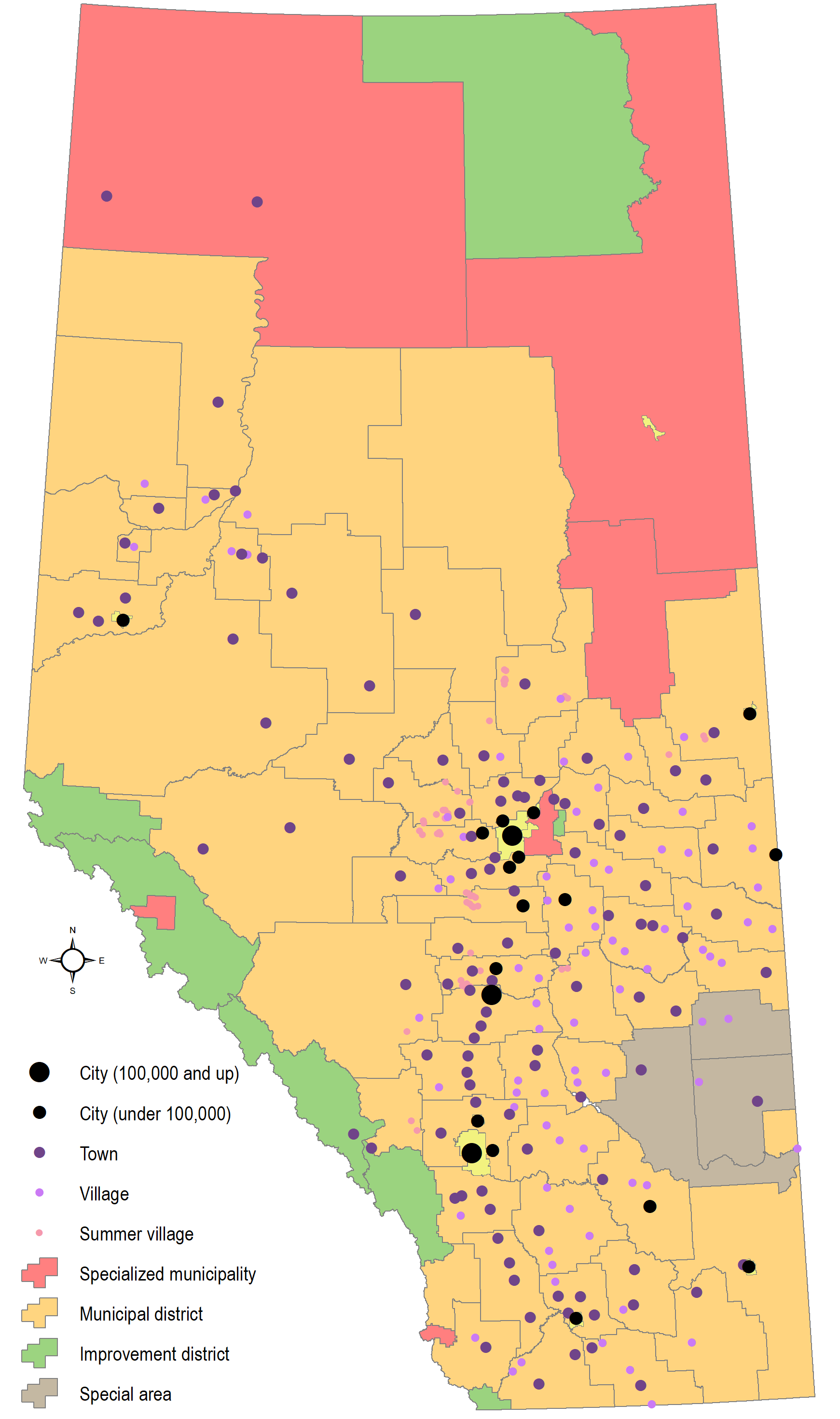
- Alberta's 344 municipalities (19 cities, 106 towns, 80 villages, 51 summer villages, 6 specialized municipalities, 63 municipal districts, 7 improvement districts, and 3 special areas) as of July 2021

Municipal elections were held in Alberta, Canada on Monday, October 16, 2017. Mayors (reeves), councillors (aldermen), and trustees were up for election in all cities (except Lloydminster), all towns, all villages, all specialized municipalities, all municipal districts, three of the eight improvement districts, and the advisory councils of the special areas.

== Cities ==
=== Airdrie ===
==== Mayor ====
Candidate	Vote	%
Peter Brown (X)	5,006	45.86
Marie Lauer	3,280	30.04
Fred Burley	1,974	18.08
Bernie Biever	461	4.22
Blaine Astra	196	1.80

==== Council ====
Top six candidates elected and are shown in bold

Candidate	Vote	%
**Ron Chapman** (X)	5,591	10.43
**Kelly Hegg** (X)	5,409	10.09
**Al Jones**	5,343	9.96
**Candice Kolson** (X)	4,423	8.25
**Darrell Belyk** (X)	3,608	6.73
**Tina Petrow**	3,329	6.21
Shelley Bitz	2,999	5.59
Allan Hunter (X)	2,812	5.24
Lindsey Coyle	2,276	4.24
Nicole Proseilo	2,208	4.12
Charlotte Blackwell	2,189	4.08
Rick Northey	1,898	3.54
Tim Lowing	1,773	3.31
Mike De Bokx	1,736	3.24
Rachael Sasha Mercedes	1,566	2.92
Brenda McIntosh-Doell	1,388	2.59
Chris Gourlie	1,164	2.17
Trevor Dziaduck	1,047	1.95
Serge Desrochers	897	1.67
Mo Benini	643	1.20
Daria Skibington-Roffel	574	1.07
Tanveer Ahmad Taj	446	0.87
Richard Douglas Absalom Herdman	281	0.52

=== Brooks ===
Mayoral candidate	Vote	%
Barry Morishita (X)	Acclaimed	

=== Calgary ===
==== Mayor ====
Candidate	Vote	%
Naheed Nenshi (X)	199,122	51.41
Bill Smith	169,367	43.73
Andre Chabot	11,945	3.08
Curtis Olson	1,776	0.46
David Lapp	1,288	0.33
Emile Gabriel	1,258	0.32
Larry Heather	845	0.22
Stan the Man Waciak	664	0.17
Brent Chisholm	576	0.15
Jason Achtymichuk	465	0.12

=== Camrose ===
Mayoral candidate	Vote	%
Norm Mayer (X)	2,416	53.62
Bill Sears	1,881	41.74
Wayne Massick	209	4.64

=== Chestermere ===
Mayoral candidate	Vote	%
Marshall Chalmers	2,628	54.02
Jeff Hodgson	987	20.29
Ryan Roch	874	17.97
Khaleel Bhatti	330	6.78
Ray Blanchard	46	0.95

=== Cold Lake ===
Mayoral candidate	Vote	%
Craig Copeland (X)	Acclaimed	

=== Edmonton ===
==== Mayor ====
Candidate	Vote	%
Don Iveson (X)	141,182	72.47
Don Koziak	13,204	6.78
Steve Shewchuk	9,716	4.99
Fahad Mughal	6,626	3.40
Justin Thomas	4,976	2.55
Mike Butler	4,028	2.07
Carla Frost	3,067	1.57
Taz Bouchier	2,782	1.43
Henry Mak	1,531	0.79
Ron Cousineau	1,252	0.64
Neil Stephens	1,231	0.63
Bob Ligertwood	1,129	0.58
Gordon Nikolic	1,062	0.55

=== Fort Saskatchewan ===
Mayoral candidate	Vote	%
Gale Katchur (X)	3,959	54.40
Arjun Randhawa	3,148	43.25
Judy Sellin	171	2.35

=== Grande Prairie ===
==== Mayor ====
Candidate	Vote	%
Bill Given (X)	6,193	68.07
Dick Baillie	2,440	26.82
Theodore Nikiforuk	383	4.21
Rony Rajput	82	0.90

==== Council ====
Top eight candidates elected and are marked in bold

Candidate	Vote	%
**Eunice Friesen**	5,282	9.61
**Chris Thiessen** (X)	5,279	9.60
**Jackie Clayton** (X)	4,382	7.97
**Dylan Bressey**	4,163	7.57
**Clyde Blackburn**	3,901	7.10
**Wade Pilat**	3,869	7.04
**Kevin P. O'Toole** (X)	3,743	6.81
**Yadvinder Singh Minhas**	3,030	5.51
Kevin McLean (X)	2,906	5.29
John Alger Mark Kirska	2,869	5.22
Cheryl Montgomery	2,774	5.50
Shannon Dunfield	2,536	4.61
John Croken	2,439	4.44
Timothy Nesbitt	2,060	3.75
Cam White	2,056	3.74
Tyla Savard	1,733	3.15
Sydney M. Fletcher	1,110	2.02
Mike Wolfel	428	0.78
Morgan Suurd	422	0.77

=== Lacombe ===
Mayoral candidate	Vote	%
Grant Creasey	1,964	58.09
Peter Bouwsema	1,417	41.91

=== Leduc ===
Mayoral candidate	Vote	%
Bob Young	2,813	45.28
Dave MacKenzie	2,457	39.55
Donna Tona	942	15.16

=== Lethbridge ===
==== Mayor ====
Candidate	Vote	%
Chris Spearman (X)	14,897	73.72
Martin Heavy Head	3,342	16.54
Bob Janzen	1,969	9.74

==== Council ====
Top eight candidates elected and are marked in bold

Candidate	Vote	%
**Mark Campbell** (X)	9,522	7.46
**Joe Mauro** (X)	8,891	6.97
**Jeff Carlson** (X)	8,140	6.38
**Ryan Parker** (X)	7,919	6.21
**Blaine E. Hyggen** (X)	7,438	5.83
**Belinda Crowson** (X)	7,391	5.79
**Jeffrey Coffman** (X)	7,368	5.78
**Rob Miyashiro** (X)	7,272	5.70
Liz Iwaskiw	5,680	4.45
Nick Paladino	5,668	4.44
Jennifer Takahashi	5,264	4.13
Harold Pereverseff	4,759	3.73
Joey Schackleford	4,728	3.71
Shelby J. McLeod	3,875	3.04
David Mikuliak	3,709	2.91
Aileen Burke	3,600	2.82
Bruce Thurber	3,325	2.61
Rena Woss	3,102	2.43
Zachary Gibb	3,058	2.40
Stephnie Watson	2,638	2.07
Bill Ginther	2,270	1.78
Raymond Hoffarth	2,250	1.76
Craig Burrows-Johnson	2,091	1.64
John Pogorzelski	1,779	1.39
Davey Wiggers	1,532	1.20
Louise Marie Saloff	1,321	1.04
Ross Morrell	1,056	0.83
Kevin Mark Layton	994	0.78
Clint Germsheid	937	0.73

=== Medicine Hat ===
==== Mayor ====
Candidate	Vote	%
Ted Clugston (X)	9,317	56.64
John Hamill	4,119	25.04
Scott Raible	2,516	15.30
Thomas Fougere	497	3.02

==== Council ====
Top eight candidates elected and are shown in bold

Candidate	Vote	%
**Robert Dumanowski** (X)	8,356	8.38
**Kris Samraj**	7,619	7.64
**Phil Turnbull**	7,393	7.41
**Julie Christine Friesen** (X)	7,056	7.07
**Darren Hirsch**	6,957	6.97
**Jim Turner** (X)	6,393	6.41
**Brian Varga** (X)	6,115	6.13
**Jamie McIntosh** (X)	6,083	6.10
Bill Cocks (X)	5,970	5.99
Les Pearson (X)	5,842	5.86
Immanuel Moritz	5,650	5.66
Mo Roberts	5,141	5.15
Hugh English	4,230	4.24
Michael Klassen	3,717	3.73
Colette Smithers	3,611	3.62
Myles Mulholland	3,536	3.54
Chuck Turner	2,656	2.66
Leslie Rath	2,008	2.01
Ryan Philip Norman Regnier	1,416	1.42

=== Red Deer ===
==== Mayor ====
Candidate	Vote	%
Tara Veer (X)	16,619	88.42
Sean Burke	2,176	11.58

==== Council ====
Top eight candidates elected and are marked in bold

Each voter cast up to eight votes each

121,746 valid votes cast

128 ballots rejected due to too many choices marked.

Percentage indicated is of votes cast, not of percentage of voters' support.

Candidate	Vote	%
**Michael Dawe**	12,258	10.07
**Tanya Handley** (X)	9,671	7.94
**Dianne Wyntjes** (X)	9,193	7.55
**Lawrence Lee** (X)	8,796	7.22
**Buck Buchanan** (X)	7,453	6.12
**Ken Johnston** (X)	7,373	6.06
**Frank Wong** (X)	6,306	5.18
**Vesna Hingham**	6,296	5.17
Lynne Mulder (X)	6,115	5.02
Rick More	5,669	4.66
Jonathan Wieler	4,709	3.87
Ted Johnson	3,537	2.91
Jeremy Moore	3,504	2.88
Jordy Smith	3,309	2.72
Calvin Goulet-Jones	3,260	2.68
Brice Unland	3,090	2.54
Sam Bergeron	2,766	2.27
Valdene Callin	2,754	2.26
Matthew Slubik	2,163	1.78
Doug Manderville	2,008	1.65
Robert Friss	1,866	1.53
Bobbi McCoy	1,694	1.39
Jim Kristinson	1,552	1.27
Bayo Nshombo Bayongwa	1,385	1.14
Cory Kingsfield	1,377	1.13
Ian Miller	1,189	0.98
Matt Chapin	979	0.80
Kris Maciborksy	935	0.77
Jason Habuza	539	0.44

=== Spruce Grove ===
Mayoral candidate	Vote	%
Stuart Houston (X)	5,381	76.74
Daniel Doornekamp	1,631	23.26

=== St. Albert ===
==== Mayor ====
Candidate	Vote	%
Cathy Heron	10,714	49.93
Cam MacKay	6,840	31.87
Malcolm Parker	3,905	18.20

==== Council ====
Top six candidates elected and are in bold

Candidate	Vote	%
**Wes Brodhead** (X)	8,900	7.82
**Jacquie Hansen**	8,479	7.45
**Sheena Hughes** (X)	7,642	6.72
**Natalie Joly**	7,446	6.55
**Ray Watkins**	7,440	6.54
**Ken MacKay** (X)	6,777	5.96
Allan Bohachyk	6,603	5.80
Jan Butler	6,599	5.80
Tash Taylor	6,571	5.78
Mark Cassidy	5,489	4.82
Charlene Jelinski	4,936	4.34
Steve Stone	4,830	4.25
Bob Russell (X)	4,083	3.59
Gilbert Cantin	3,723	3.27
Sandyne Beach-McCutcheon	3,192	2.81
Hannes Rudolph	3,099	2.72
Craig Cameron	2,845	2.50
Jaye Walter	2,730	2.40
Barry Zukewich	2,496	2.19
Ufuoma Odebala-Fregene	2,283	2.01
Mark Kay	1,900	1.67
Nestor Andrew Petriw	1,708	1.50
Leonard Wilkins	1,566	1.38
Jacy Eberlein	1,303	1.15
Shayne Kawalilak	1,125	0.99

=== Wetaskiwin ===
Candidate	Vote	%
Tyler Gandam	2,081	69.55
Glen Ruecker	911	30.45

== Towns ==
The following are the 2017 municipal election results for towns with 5,000 or more inhabitants.

=== Banff ===
Mayoral candidate	Vote	%
Karen Sorensen (X)	1,223	56.08
Hugh Pettigrew	958	43.92

=== Beaumont ===
Mayoral candidate	Vote	%
John Stewart	1,354	30.90
Kerri Bauer	931	21.25
Gil Poitras	778	17.75
Bruce LeCren	732	16.70
Patrick John Kobly	555	12.67
K. C. Sommers	32	0.73

=== Blackfalds ===
==== Mayor ====
Candidate	Vote	%
Richard Poole	863	80.06
Gary Smith	215	19.94

==== Council ====
Candidate	Vote	%
Vincent Wolfe		
Jennifer Myslicki		
James Hoover		
Marina Appel		
Ray Olfert (X)		
William Taylor (X)		
Rebecca Stendie		
Laura Svab		
Michael Francis		
Karen Sernecky		
Nicole Sutherland (X)		
Carol Rosenfelt		

=== Bonnyville ===
Mayoral candidate	Vote	%
Gene Sobolewski (X)	Acclaimed	

=== Canmore ===
Mayoral candidate	Vote	%
John Borrowman (X)	2,862	64.62
Ed Russell	1,567	35.38

=== Coaldale ===
Mayoral candidate	Vote	%
Kim Craig (X)	1,149	51.32
Jack Van Rijn	1,090	48.68

=== Cochrane ===
Mayoral candidate	Vote	%
Jeff Genung	4,321	61.61
Ivan Brooker (X)	2,252	32.11
Tom Hardy	440	6.27

=== Devon ===
Mayoral candidate	Vote	%
Ray Ralph	618	32.84
Murray Abtosway	565	30.02
Anita Fisher	413	21.94
Stephen Lindop (X)	286	15.20

=== Didsbury ===
Mayoral candidate	Vote	%
Rhonda Hunter	513	31.11
Joyce McCoy	441	26.74
Norm L. Quantz	415	25.17
Rick Mousseau (X)	200	12.13
Keegon McPherson	80	4.85

=== Drayton Valley ===
Mayoral candidate	Vote	%
Michael James Doerksen	850	48.57
Brandy Fredrickson	648	37.03
Cecile Shewfelt	252	14.40

=== Drumheller ===
Mayoral candidate	Vote	%
Heather Colberg	2,128	81.22
Sharel Shoff	492	18.78

=== Edson ===
Mayoral candidate	Vote	%
Kevin Zahara	1,160	61.21
Greg Pasychny (X)	735	38.79

=== High River ===
Mayoral candidate	Vote	%
Craig Lyle Snodgrass (X)	2,374	70.17
Paul Milligan	1,009	29.83

=== Hinton ===
Mayoral candidate	Vote	%
Marcel Michaels	1,321	53.42
Stuart Taylor	844	34.13
Benita Smit	308	12.45

=== Innisfail ===
Mayoral candidate	Vote	%
Jim Romane	1,168	61.64
Brian Spiller (X)	727	38.36

=== Morinville ===
Mayoral candidate	Vote	%
Barry Turner	Acclaimed	

=== Okotoks ===
Mayoral candidate	Vote	%
Bill Robertson (X)	3,111	55.19
Carrie Fischer	2,526	44.81

=== Olds ===
Mayoral candidate	Vote	%
Michael Muzychka	Acclaimed	

=== Peace River ===
Mayoral candidate	Vote	%
Tom Tarpey (X)	977	57.78
Sherry Hinton	401	23.71
James Paras	313	18.51

=== Ponoka ===
Mayoral candidate	Vote	%
Rick Bonnet (X)	1,352	68.80
Larry Henkelman	613	31.20

=== Redcliff ===
Mayoral candidate	Vote	%
Dwight Kilpatrick	591	54.22
Ernie Reimer (X)	499	45.78

=== Rocky Mountain House ===
Mayoral candidate	Vote	%
Tammy Burke	747	51.73
Sheila Mizera	697	48.27

=== Slave Lake ===
Mayoral candidate	Vote	%
Tyler Warman (X)	Acclaimed	

=== Stettler ===
Mayoral candidate	Vote	%
Sean Nolls	Acclaimed	

=== Stony Plain ===
Mayoral candidate	Vote	%
William Choy (X)	2,427	63.68
Robert Twerdoclib	1,384	36.32

=== St. Paul ===
Mayoral candidate	Vote	%
Maureen Miller	955	57.29
Glenn Andersen (X)	712	42.71

=== Strathmore ===
Mayoral candidate	Vote	%
Pat Fule	2,773	86.06
Earl Best	449	13.94

=== Sylvan Lake ===
Mayoral candidate	Vote	%
Sean McIntyre (X)	Acclaimed	

=== Taber ===
Mayoral candidate	Vote	%
Andrew Prokop (X)	1,227	62.51
Randy Sparks	736	37.49

=== Vegreville ===
Mayoral candidate	Vote	%
Tim MacPhee (X)	990	51.06
Myron Hayduk	949	48.94

=== Wainwright ===
Mayoral candidate	Vote	%
Brian Bethune (X)	Acclaimed	

=== Westlock ===
Mayoral candidate	Vote	%
Ralph Leriger (X)	Acclaimed	

=== Whitecourt ===
Mayoral candidate	Vote	%
Maryann Irene Chichak (X)	1,365	61.61
Darlene Chartrand	850	38.39

== Specialized municipalities ==
=== Municipality of Crowsnest Pass ===
Mayoral candidate	Vote	%
Blair Painter (X)	Acclaimed	

=== Lac La Biche County ===
Mayoral candidate	Vote	%
Omer Moghrabi (X)	2,099	59.87
Gail Broadbent-Ludwig	1,407	40.13

=== Mackenzie County ===
Mackenzie County elects its reeve from among its ten council members.

=== Strathcona County ===
==== Mayor ====
Candidate	Vote	%
Rod Frank	10,310	37.33
Roxanne Carr (X)	8,287	30.01
Jacquie Fenske	4,257	15.41
Linda Osinchuk	3,572	12.93
David Dixon	1,192	4.32

==== Council ====
Candidate	Vote	%
Ward 1
Robert Parks	2,556	63.47
Maurice Perrault	1,471	36.53
Ward 2
Dave Anderson (X)	2,496	57.29
Walter Schwabe	955	21.92
Leonard Goulet	906	20.79
Ward 3
Brian Botterill (X)	1,771	47.53
Brett Dermott	1,638	43.96
Nicholas Nigro	317	8.51
Ward 4
Bill Tonita	1,672	46.97
Jamie Fraleigh	889	24.97
Don McPherson	510	14.33
Karen Lefebvre	489	13.74
Ward 5
Paul Smith (X)	1,097	42.44
Bob Leman	709	27.43
Aaron C. Nelson	647	25.03
David Kierstead	132	5.11
Ward 6
Linton Delainey (X)	1,416	53.53
Alan Dunn	419	15.84
Sarah Patterson	412	15.58
Patrick Hildebrand	398	15.05
Ward 7
Glen Lawrence	1,211	53.37
Brandie Harrop	1,058	46.63
Ward 8
Katie Berghofer	1,949	48.46
Floyd House	1,066	26.50
Rex Adam	1,007	25.04

=== Regional Municipality of Wood Buffalo ===
==== Mayor ====
Candidate	Vote	%
Don Scott	8,911	68.65
Allan Grandison	3,160	24.35
Tony Needham	650	5.01
Allan Glenn Vinni	259	2.00

==== Council ====
Elected candidates shown in bold

Candidate	Vote	%
Ward 1 - six to be elected
**Phil Meagher** (X)	6,508	11.25
**Jeff Peddle**	6,385	11.04
**Krista Balsom**	6,138	10.61
**Keith McGrath** (X)	5,720	9.89
**Mike Allen**	5,577	9.64
**Verna Murphy**	5,236	9.05
Lance Bussieres (X)	5,016	8.67
Arianna Johnson	4,648	8.04
Adem Campbell	4,005	6.92
M. Shafiq Dogar	3,276	5.66
J. Paul McLeod	2,492	4.31
Ali Syed	1,859	3.21
Hukun Hurur	981	1.70
Ward 2 - two to be elected
**Claris Voyageur** (X)	224	30.48
**John Bruce Inglis**	183	24.90
Julia Cardinal (X)	148	20.14
Scott Clayton Flett	121	16.46
David Blair	32	4.35
Dan Mercredi	27	3.67
Ward 3 - one to be elected
**Sheila Lalonde**	181	52.77
Brad Lucier	162	47.23
Ward 4 - one to be elected
**Jane Stroud** (X)	238	72.12
Kevin Tremblay	92	27.88

== Municipal districts ==
=== Athabasca County ===
Athabasca County elects its reeve from among its nine council members.

=== County of Barrhead No. 11 ===
The County of Barrhead No. 11 elects its reeve from among its seven council members.

=== Beaver County ===
Beaver County elects its reeve from among its five council members.

=== Big Lakes County ===
Big Lakes County elects its reeve from among its nine council members.

=== Municipal District of Bonnyville No. 87 ===
Reeve candidate	Vote	%
Greg Sawchuk	1,835	53.80
Barry Kalinski	1,576	46.20

=== Brazeau County ===
Reeve candidate	Vote	%
Bart Guyon (X)	Acclaimed	

=== Camrose County ===
Camrose County elects its reeve from among its seven council members.

=== Clearwater County ===
Clearwater County elects its reeve from among its seven council members.

=== Cypress County ===
Cypress County elects its reeve from among its nine council members.

=== Municipal District of Foothills No. 31 ===
The Municipal District of Foothills No. 31 elects its mayor from among its seven council members.

=== County of Grande Prairie No. 1 ===
The County of Grande Prairie No. 11 elects its mayor from among its nine council members.

Candidate	Vote	%
Division 1
Harold Bulford (X)	Acclaimed	
Division 2
Daryl Beeston (X)	499	84
Don Streeper	31	5
Thomas Walter Tharp	63	11
Division 3
Leanne Beaupre (X)	372	71
Barry Yaehne	152	29
Division 4
Maurissa Hietland	196	30
Bernie Smashnuk	173	26
Ross Sutherland (X)	293	44
Division 5
Kevin Gingles	176	33
Robert Hill	132	25
Bob Marshall (X)	229	43
Division 6
Peter Harris (X)	171	49
Ashley Heggelund	111	32
Kathleen Jean Longson	66	19
Ward 7
Arthur Amendt	100	32
Linda Dianne Waddy	213	68
Ward 8
Karen Rosvold (X)	Acclaimed	
Ward 9
Dwayne A. Badry	202	47
Corey Beck (X)	225	53

=== Municipal District of Greenview No. 16 ===
The Municipal District of Greenview No. 16 elects its reeve from among its eight council members.

=== Kneehill County ===
Kneehill County elects its reeve from among its seven council members.

=== Lacombe County ===
Lacombe County elects its reeve from among its seven council members.

=== Lac Ste. Anne County ===
Lac Ste. Anne County elects its mayor from among its seven council members.

=== Leduc County ===
Leduc County elects its mayor from among its seven council members.

=== Lethbridge County ===
Lethbridge County elects its reeve from among its seven council members.

=== Mountain View County ===
Mounatain View County elects its reeve from among its seven council members.

=== County of Newell ===
The County of Newell elects its reeve from among its ten council members.

Candidate	Vote	%
Division 1
Clarence Amulung	Acclaimed	
Division 2
Hubert Kallen	Acclaimed	
Division 3
Anne Marie Philipsen	Acclaimed	
Division 4
Wayne Hammergren (X)	83	73
Inge Hoekstra	30	27
Division 5
Tracy Fyfe	Acclaimed	
Division 6
Kelly Christman	Acclaimed	
Division 7
Ellen Unruh (X)	97	66
Edward Penner	49	34
Division 8
Brian de Jong (X)	58	56
Terry Neigum	45	44
Division 9
Molly Douglass	Acclaimed	
Division 10
Lionel Juss	Acclaimed	

=== Parkland County ===
Mayoral candidate	Vote	%
Rod Shaigec (X)	2,794	61.46
Donald J. Heron	1,358	29.87
Curtis Roper	394	8.67

=== Ponoka County ===
Ponoka County elects its reeve from among its five council members.

=== Red Deer County ===
Mayoral candidate	Vote	%
Jim Wood (X)	2,550	67.28
Debra Hanna	1,240	32.72

=== Rocky View County ===
Council

Rocky View County's council elects the reeve from among the nine of themselves after the election.

Candidate	Vote	%
Division 1
Mark Kamachi	617	71.16
Enrique Massot	250	28.84
Division 2
Kim McKylor	519	51.18
Jerry Arshinoff (X)	495	48.82
Division 3
Kevin Hanson	669	56.65
Gordon Branson	512	43.35
Division 4
Albert Michael Schule	728	54.13
Douglas Fairley	617	45.87
Division 5
Jerry Gautreau	556	87.42
Steven Gehring	80	12.58
Division 6
Greg Boehlke (X)	372	74.10
John McMurray	130	25.90
Division 7
Daniel Henn	399	50.38
Syd Hartley	393	49.62
Division 8
Samanntha Wright	877	52.20
Eric Lowther (X)	803	47.80
Division 9
Crystal Kissel	578	49.61
Colleen E. Munro	329	28.24
Bruce Kendall (X)	258	22.15

=== County of Stettler No. 6 ===
The County of Stettler No. 6 elects its reeve from among its seven council members.

=== County of St. Paul No. 19 ===
Reeve candidate	Vote	%
Steve Upham (X)	1,187	46.59
Glen Ockerman	733	28.77
Leo de Moissac	628	24.65

=== Sturgeon County ===
Mayoral candidate	Vote	%
Alanna Hnatiw	2,930	52.68
Tom Flynn (X)	2,632	47.32

=== Municipal District of Taber ===
The Municipal District of Taber elects its reeve from among its seven council members.

=== County of Vermilion River ===
The County of Vermilion River elects its reeve from among its seven council members.

=== Vulcan County ===
Vulcan County elects its reeve from among its seven council members.

Candidate	Vote	%
Division 1
Serena Donovan	90	57
David Bexte	52	33
Lee Ward	15	10
Division 2
Shane Cockwill	A	100
Division 3
Jason Schneider	A	100
Division 4
Laurie Lyckman	67	88
Jack Feenstra	9	12
Division 5
Michael Monner	A	100
Division 6
Ryan Smith	80	75
Carmen Pelletier	26	25
Division 7
Doug Logan	80	55
Greg Honess	64	44
Mike Collins	2	1

=== Westlock County ===
Westlock County elects its reeve from among its seven council members.

=== County of Wetaskiwin No. 10 ===
The County of Wetaskiwin No. 10 elects its reeve from among its seven council members.

=== Wheatland County ===
Wheatland County elects its reeve from among its seven council members.

=== Municipal District of Willow Creek No. 26 ===
The Municipal District of Willow Creek No. 26 elects its reeve from among its seven council members.

=== Yellowhead County ===
Mayoral candidate	Vote	%
Gerald Soroka (X)	1,293	47.47
Maxine Beasley	746	27.39
Ruth Martin Williams	548	20.12
Dallas Haywood	137	5.03

== See also ==
- 2017 Alberta municipal censuses
- List of municipalities in Alberta
