= 2021 Alberta municipal elections =

Local elections in Canada

- October 18, 2021
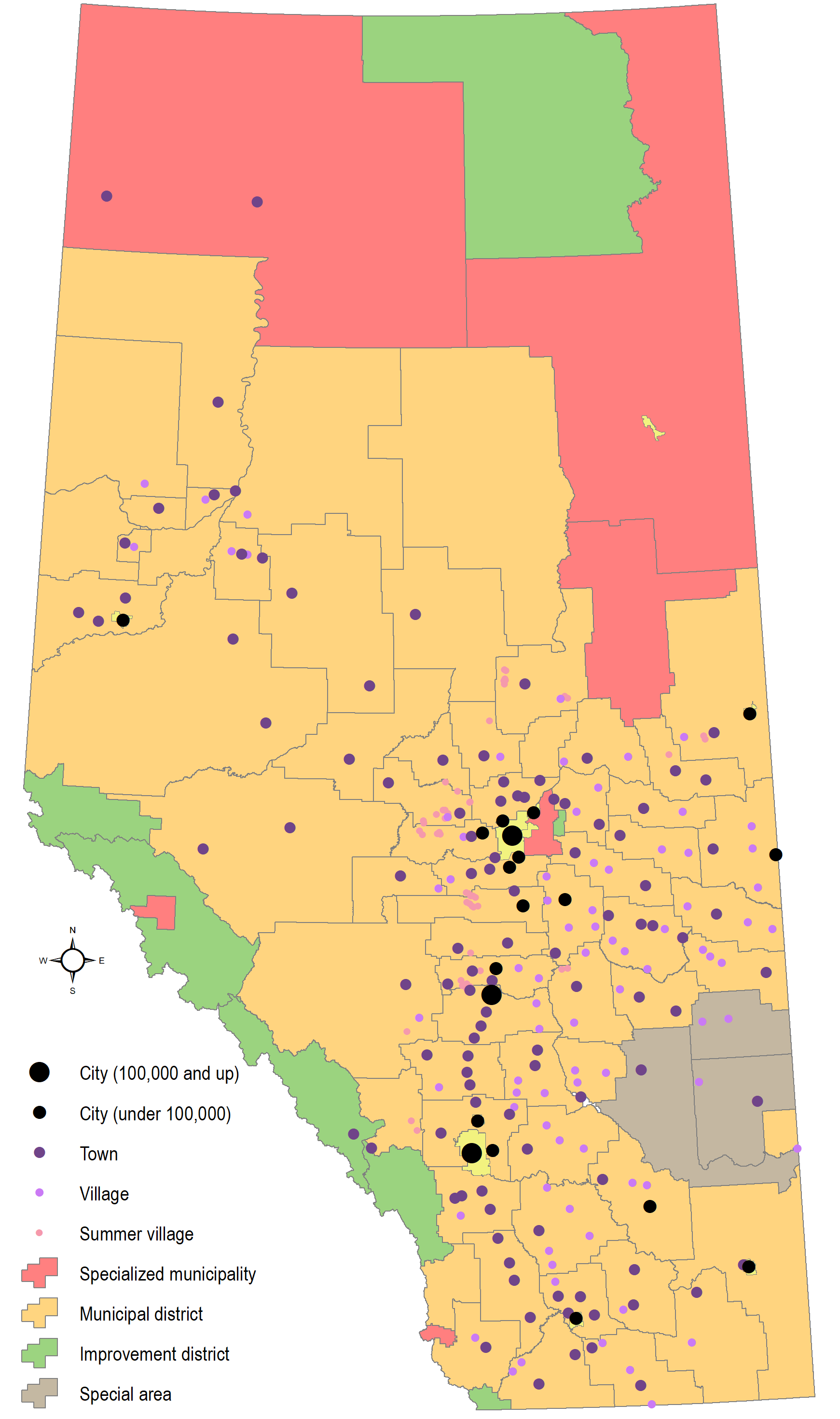
- Alberta's 344 municipalities (19 cities, 106 towns, 80 villages, 51 summer villages, 6 specialized municipalities, 63 municipal districts, 7 improvement districts, and 3 special areas) as of July 2021

Municipal elections were held in Alberta, Canada on October 18, 2021. Chief elected officials (mayors or reeves) and councillors (or aldermen), were up for election in all cities (except Lloydminster), towns, villages, specialized municipalities, and municipal districts, as are trustees for public and separate school divisions. A provincewide vote on equalization and Daylight Saving Time was also held.

== Background ==
New spending limits will come into force before the election. New revisions to the Local Authorities Act will now place a $30,000 donation limit on third party advertisers (such as labour unions, and special interest groups). But also exempts them from disclosing their financials until after election day. This is the first time that limits have been placed on third party groups, but critics say the limit is still too high to prevent political influence and that spending is still not capped.

== Cities ==
The following are the municipalities incorporated as cities in Alberta that will vote in the 2021 Alberta Municipal election. All cities in Alberta vote at the same time, except for Lloydminster. Incumbents are marked by an X, and elected candidates are bolded.

=== Airdrie ===
Mayor

Candidate	Vote	%
**Peter Brown** (X)	7,848	66.38
Lindsey Coyle	2,382	20.15
Allan Hunter	1,592	13.47

Council

Top six candidates are elected at large

Candidate	Vote	%
**Tina Petrow** (X)	6,827	12.23
**Ron Chapman** (X)	5,161	9.25
**Candice Kolson** (X)	5,111	9.16
**Heather Spearman**	4,937	8.85
**Al Jones** (X)	4,502	8.07
**Darrell Belyk** (X)	3,014	5.40
Jay Raymundo	2,917	5.23
Mark Steffler	2,823	5.06
Chris Stockton	2,757	4.94
Jaclyn Dorchak	2,738	4.91
Chris Glass	2,550	4.57
Trevor Cameron	2,163	3.88
Derrick Greenwood	2,144	3.84
Rachael Mercedes	2,084	3.73
Lore Perez	2,072	3.71
Sunday Adeleye	2,020	3.62
Reggie Lang	1,391	2.49
Tanveer Taj	605	1.08

=== Beaumont ===
Mayor

Candidate	Vote	%
**Bill Daneluik**	2,267	50.41
Chantal Yardley	995	22.13
John Stewart (X)	968	21.53
Coreina Hubert	159	3.54
Rodney Erismann	108	2.40

Council

Top six candidates are elected at large

Candidate	Vote	%
**Ashley Miller**	2,597	11.64
**Rene Tessier**	2,418	10.83
**Sam Munckhof-Swain** (X)	2,216	9.93
**Kathy Barnhart** (X)	2,104	9.43
**Steven vanNieuwkerk** (X)	1,984	8.88
**Catherine McCook**	1,870	8.38
Perry Hendriks (X)	1,620	7.26
Martin Stout (X)	1,444	6.47
Philip Penrod	1,337	5.99
Jason Hart	1,036	4.64
Nam Khular	946	4.24
Karunesh Saroya	815	3.65
Gary Sran	749	3.36
David Hamilton	636	2.85
Yash Sharma	546	2.45

=== Brooks ===
Mayor

Candidate	Vote	%
**John Petrie**	1,580	57.62
Norman Gerestein	1,162	42.38

Council

Top six candidates are elected at large

Candidate	Vote	%
**John Nesbitt (X)**	1367	10.99
**Joel Goodnough (X)**	1336	10.74
**Marissa Wardrop**	1213	9.75
**Mohammed Idriss**	1150	9.25
**Bill Prentice (X)**	1146	9.22
**Ray Juska**	1117	8.98
Jim Third	1113	8.95
Dave Zukowski	954	7.67
Mike Regner	810	6.51
Grace Miedema	744	5.98
Ryan Mobbs	639	5.14
Chris Kenney	435	3.50
Fakhar Islam	412	3.31

=== Calgary ===
Calgary's incumbent mayor, Naheed Nenshi, has announced he will not seek re-election in 2021.

=== Camrose ===
Mayor

Candidate	Vote	%
**PJ Stasko**	3,315	61.45
Max Lindstrand	2,080	38.55

Council

Top eight candidates are elected at large

Candidate	Vote	%
**Don Rosland**	2,802	8.56
**Agnes Hoveland** (X)	2,677	8.18
**Kevin Hycha** (X)	2,661	8.13
**Lucas Banack**	2,558	7.81
**Lana Broker**	2,410	7.36
**David R. Francoeur**	2,107	6.44
**DJ Ilg**	2,064	6.30
**Joy-Anne Murphy**	2,038	6.22
Greg Sharp	1,823	5.57
Doug MacKay	1,779	5.43
Julie Girard	1,776	5.42
Troy Thompson	1,558	4.76
Ron Baier	1,490	4.55
Thomas David (Tom) Calhoun	1,135	3.47
Geoffrey Ryan Turnquist	1,046	3.19
Wyatt Tanton	951	2.90
Larissa Berlin	823	2.51
Robbyn Thompson	799	2.44
Anthony Holler	244	0.75

=== Chestermere ===
Mayor

Candidate	Vote	%
**Jeff Colvin**	2,927	62.80
Michelle Young	1,734	37.20

Council

Top six candidates are elected at large

Candidate	Vote	%
**Shannon Dean**	2,522	10.46
**Stephen Hanley**	2,397	9.94
**Mel Foat** (X)	2,365	9.81
**Ritesh Dalip Narayan** (X)	2,146	8.90
**Blaine Funk**	2,067	8.57
**Sandy (Sandeep) Johal-Watt**	1,952	8.10
Janelle Sandboe	1,871	7.76
Laurie Dunn	1,858	7.71
Murray Grant	1,666	6.91
Morgan Matheson	1,659	6.88
Satish Lal	1,071	4.44
Cyndie McOuat	1,017	4.22
Anna Kardash	831	3.45
Neena Obhrai	683	2.83

==== By-election ====
There was a mayor and council by-election held on June 24, 2024 to replace Jeff Colvin and four councillors who had been removed from their posts by the provincial government due to a "failure to fix dysfunction".

Mayoral results:

Candidate	Vote	%
**Shannon Dean**	**3,559**	**55.96**
Marshall Chalmers	1,102	17.33
Jeff Colvin (X)	1,072	16.86
Chris Steeves	627	9.86

=== Cold Lake ===
Mayor

Candidate	Vote	%
Craig Copeland (X)	Acclaimed	

Council

Top six candidates are elected at large

Candidate	Vote	%
**Bob Mattice**	1,725	12.90
**Chris Vining** (X)	1,382	10.34
**Vicky Lefebvre** (X)	1,191	8.91
**Adele Richardson**	1,039	7.77
**Ryan Bailey**	1,027	7.68
**William (Bill) Charles Parker**	1,017	7.61
Ryan Lefebvre	988	7.39
Bob Buckle (X)	834	6.24
Rhea McMillan	813	6.08
Murray Gauthier	800	5.98
Hussein Elkadri	760	5.69
Debra Pelechosky	633	4.74
Larry Ashcroft	600	4.49
Sarah Fewchuk	558	4.17

=== Edmonton ===
Amarjeet Sohi won the Mayoral election, and for the first time in Edmonton's history the majority of City Councilors will be women.

=== Fort Saskatchewan ===
Mayor

Candidate	Vote	%
**Gale Katchur** (X)	3,329	52.27
Deanna Lennox	3,040	47.73

Council

Top six candidates are elected at large

Candidate	Vote	%
**Lisa Makin** (X)	3779	12.13
**Jibs Abitoye** (X)	3483	11.18
**Brian Kelly** (X)	3269	10.49
**Gordon Harris** (X)	3237	10.39
**Patrick Noyen**	3143	10.09
**Birgit Blizzard**	2822	9.06
Mike Ferris	2795	8.97
Frank Garritsen	2322	7.45
Dennis Thompson	1744	5.60
Greg Richardson	1316	4.22
Stuart McGowan	1269	4.07
Michelle Kyle	1173	3.76
Charles Simpson	813	2.61

=== Grande Prairie ===
Mayor

Candidate	Vote	%
**Jackie Clayton** (X)	4,270	44.70
Eunice Friesen	4,135	43.29
Bryan Petryshyn	837	8.76
Glyn Gruner	310	3.25

Council

Top eight candidates are elected at large

Candidate	Vote	%
**Chris Thiessen** (X)	5,515	9.86
**Grant Berg**	5,014	8.97
**Dylan Bressey** (X)	4,493	8.03
**Kevin P. O'Toole** (X)	4,103	7.34
**Wendy Bosch**	3,803	6.80
**John Lehners**	3,719	6.65
**Gladys Blackmore**	3,300	5.90
**Mike O'Connor**	3,284	5.87
Yad Minhas (X)	3,010	5.38
Kevin McLean	2,985	5.34
Tammy Brown	2,923	5.23
Solomon Okhifoh	2,765	4.94
Melissa J. Erickson	2,410	4.31
Neil Tuazon	1,967	3.52
Ejibola Folashade Adetokunbo-Taiwo	1,832	3.28
Sarvinder Singh	1,582	2.83
Michelle Jasper	1,554	2.78
Gerald Scott Hafner	1,209	2.16
Ngemital Paul Rovin	454	0.81

==== By-election ====
There was a council by-election held on October 17, 2022 to replace John Lehners who had died.

Results:

Candidate	Vote	%
**Wade Pilat**	**669**	**27.62**
Kevin McLean	432	17.84
Solomon Okifoh	407	16.80
Erik Gault	318	13.13
Robin Rochon	242	9.99
Tammy Brown	232	9.58
Frank Skolly	101	4.17
Bryan Petryshyn	21	0.87

=== Lacombe ===
Mayor

Candidate	Vote	%
Grant Creasey (X)	Acclaimed	

Council

Top six candidates are elected at large

Candidate	Vote	%
**Thalia Hibbs** (X)	1,756	15.61
**Cora Hoekstra** (X)	1,642	14.60
**Reuben Konnik** (X)	1,466	13.03
**Don Gullekson** (X)	1,384	12.30
**Chris Ross** (X)	1,211	10.76
**Scott Dallas**	1,150	10.22
Jonathan Jacobson (X)	1,128	10.03
Wayne Armishaw	1,072	9.53
W. Sandy (Pepper) Douglas	441	3.92

=== Leduc ===
Mayor

Candidate	Vote	%
**Bob Young** (X)	4,591	66.24
Lynn Schrader	1,426	20.57
Karen Richert	914	13.19

Council

Top six candidates are elected at large

Candidate	Vote	%
**Lars Hansen** (X)	4,688	14.19
**Glen Finstad** (X)	3,844	11.63
**Laura Tillack** (X)	3,775	11.42
**Beverly Beckett** (X)	3,617	10.95
**Ryan Pollard**	3,576	10.82
**Bill Hamilton** (X)	3,476	10.52
Terry Lazowski (X)	3,225	9.76
Tammy Haayema	2,922	8.84
Dawn Macdougall	2,840	8.59
Jeremy Langedahl	1,081	3.27

=== Lethbridge ===
Lethbridge's incumbent mayor, Chris Spearman, has announced he will not seek re-election in 2021.

Plebiscite

Lethbridge's 2021 municipal election will include two plebiscite questions – one on establishing a ward system and one to construct a third river crossing over the Oldman River.

Question	Yes	No
"Do you support using a ward system to elect City Councillors (other than the Mayor) starting with the 2025 municipal election?"	14,611	11,625
"Do you agree that city council should approve plans to construct a 3rd bridge prior to 2030 as a municipal capital project priority?"	16,463	10,790

=== Medicine Hat ===
Mayor

Candidate	Vote	%
**Linnsie Clark**	13,151	66.43
Ted Clugston (X)	4,639	23.43
Alan Rose	1,562	7.89
Tony Leahy	319	1.61
Michael Starner	126	0.64

Council

Top eight candidates are elected at large

Candidate	Vote	%
**Ramona Karen Robins**	8,113	7.01
**Andy McGrogan**	8,095	6.99
**Allison Knodel**	8,083	6.98
**Robert Dumanowski** (X)	7,737	6.69
**Alison Van Dyke**	7,225	6.24
**Cassi Hider**	6,747	5.83
**Shila Sharps**	5,901	5.10
**Darren Hirsch** (X)	5,283	4.56
Brian Varga (X)	4,403	3.80
Phil Turnbull (X)	4,253	3.67
Mandi Lee Campbell	4,226	3.65
Immanuel Moritz	3,996	3.45
Brian Webster	3,722	3.22
Kelly Allard	3,450	2.98
Marco Jansen	3,413	2.95
Brian Dueck	3,397	2.94
Jim Black	3,082	2.66
Bill Bergeson	2,911	2.52
Justin Wright	2,611	2.26
Paul Wray Hemsing	2,375	2.05
Praveen Joshi	2,341	2.02
Warren Pister	2,316	2.00
Rockford Rutledge	1,876	1.62
Mark Asham	1,831	1.58
Jeremy Silver	1,730	1.49
Stephen Campbell	1,481	1.28
Jay Hitchen	1,348	1.16
Bradley Gruszie	1,081	0.93
Charles Chuck Turner	771	0.67
Roger Steven McClary	617	0.53
Nicholas Martin	603	0.52
Jim Allan Turner	371	0.32
Shane Gilmore	346	0.30

=== Red Deer ===
Mayor

Candidate	Vote	%
**Ken Johnston**	11,611	54.76
Jeremy Moore	3,169	14.95
S.H. (Buck) Buchanan	3,086	14.55
Bradley James Magee	2,049	9.66
Dwight G. Hickey	900	4.24
James Allen	389	1.83

Council

Top eight candidates are elected at large

Candidate	Vote	%
**Michael Dawe** (X)	12,141	8.99
**Cindy Jefferies**	11,304	8.37
**Dianne Wyntjes** (X)	8,961	6.64
**Lawrence Lee** (X)	8,310	6.16
**Bruce Buruma**	7,067	5.24
**Vesna Higham** (X)	6,298	4.67
**Kraymer Barnstable**	5,892	4.37
**Victor Doerksen**	5,884	4.36
Chad Krahn	5,122	3.79
Sadia Khan	5,000	3.70
Dax Williams	4,865	3.60
Janise Somer	4,809	3.56
Hans Huizing	4,687	3.47
Jason MacDonald	4,677	3.46
Craig Curtis	4,543	3.37
Sheyi Olubowale	4,245	3.14
Graham Barclay	4,061	3.01
Nicole (Nikki) Lydiard	3,725	2.76
Brenda Campbell	3,525	2.61
Sarah Harksen	3,290	2.44
Grace Joy Engel	2,540	1.88
Harish Ratra	2,495	1.85
Lisa Spencer-Cook	2,468	1.83
Calvin Campbell	2,067	1.53
Liam Milaney	1,634	1.21
Lindsay LaRocque	1,362	1.01
Jozef Mihaly	1,353	1.00
Ryan Andrew Laloge	1,317	0.98
Matt Chapin	902	0.67
Stephen (Steve) Coop	435	0.32

==== By-election ====
A municipal by-election was held on April 22, 2024 following the death of Michael Dawe.

Candidate	Vote	%
**Chad Krahn**	**2,512**	**36.93**
Jaelene Tweedle	2,355	34.62
Buck Buchanan	479	7.04
Hans Huizing	381	5.60
Linda Cullen-Saik	296	4.35
Jason Chilibeck	287	4.22
Calvin Yzerman	183	2.69
Ashley MacDonald	165	2.43
Mark Collings	115	1.69
The Level Milaney	29	0.43

=== Spruce Grove ===
Mayor

Candidate	Vote	%
**Jeff Acker**	4,245	54.18
Chantal McKenzie	2,727	34.81
Len Gierach	863	11.01

Council

Top six candidates are elected at large

Candidate	Vote	%
**Dave Oldham** (X)	5,344	14.25
**Stuart Houston**	4,757	12.69
**Danielle Carter**	4,032	10.75
**Jan Gillett**	3,560	9.49
**Reid MacDonald**	3,323	8.86
**Erin Stevenson** (X)	3,295	8.79
Jeff Tokar	3,231	8.62
Jackie McCuaig	2,710	7.23
Michelle Thiebauld-Gruhlke (X)	2,405	6.41
Christopher McDonald	2,225	5.93
Jason Pickett	2,005	5.35
Francis B. Crowther	612	1.63

=== St. Albert ===
Mayor is elected through First-past-the-post voting.

Councillors are elected through Plurality block voting, with each voter able to cast up to six votes.

Mayor

Candidate	Vote	%
**Cathy Heron** (X)	6,927	39.42
Angela Wood	6,328	36.01
David Letourneau	2,579	14.68
Bob Russell	1,740	9.90

Council

Top six candidates are elected at large

Candidate	Vote	%
**Ken MacKay** (X)	7,791	8.73
**Sheena Hughes** (X)	7,788	8.72
**Wes Brodhead** (X)	7,229	8.10
**Natalie Joly** (X)	7,067	7.92
**Mike Killick**	6,362	7.13
**Shelley Biermanski**	6,260	7.01
Sandy Clark	6,031	6.76
Ross Guffei	4,942	5.54
Jennifer Cote	4,825	5.40
Leonard Wilkins	4,310	4.83
Rachel Jones	4,098	4.59
Kevan Donald Jess	4,095	4.59
Donna Kawahara	4,067	4.56
Gilbert Cantin	3,209	3.59
Shawn Michel LeMay	2,691	3.01
Louis Sobolewski	2,616	2.93
Wally Popik	2,385	2.67
Isadore Peter Stoyko	1,365	1.53
Mike Ferguson	1,264	1.42
Joseph Trapani	887	0.99

=== Wetaskiwin ===
Mayor

Candidate	Vote	%
**Tyler Gandam** (X)	1,819	54.36
Joe Branco	1,299	38.82
Jenn Moriartey	180	5.38
Craig Haavaldsen	48	1.43

Council

Top six candidates are elected at large

Candidate	Vote	%
**Wayne Neilson** (X)	1,895	11.83
**Gabrielle Blatz** (X)	1,783	11.13
**Bill Elliot**	1,716	10.71
**Dean Billingsley** (X)	1,597	9.97
**Karen Aberle**	1,384	8.64
**Kevin Lonsdale** (X)	1,362	8.50
Amanda Rule	1,171	7.31
Colleen Thiessen	1,128	7.04
Steven Venardos	963	6.01
Jessi Hanks	857	5.35
Myrna (MJ) Fontaine	578	3.61
Roderick Mackenzie	450	2.81
Mike Cifarelli	350	2.18
Ronald Mildenberger	337	2.10
James Commet	263	1.64
Magpie Ilkiw	185	1.15

== Towns ==
The following are the municipalities incorporated as towns in Alberta that will vote in the 2021 Alberta Municipal election. Unless otherwise stated, each town elects the top six candidates for council at large. Incumbents are marked by an X.

=== Athabasca ===
Mayor

Candidate	Vote	%
Robert Balay	624	88.14
Robert Woito	84	11.86

Council

Candidate	Vote	%
Jonathan LeMessurier	539	16.73
David Pacholok (X)	512	15.90
Ida Edwards (X)	480	14.90
Sara Graling	421	13.07
Edith Yuill	357	11.08
Loretta Prosser	284	8.82
Roger Morrill	247	7.67
Rena Zatorski	211	6.55
Michael Borody	170	5.28

=== Banff ===
Mayor

Candidate	Vote	%
Corrie DiManno	1,096	53.20
Brian James Standish	500	24.27
Karen Marlene Thomas	432	20.97
Garry Gilmour	32	1.55

Council

Candidate	Vote	%
Barb Pelham	1,251	12.56
Kaylee Ram	1,146	11.51
Ted Christensen (X)	901	9.05
Grant Canning (X)	879	8.83
Chip (Cheryl) Olver (X)	876	8.80
Hugh Pettigrew	831	8.35
Allan Buckingham	790	7.93
Mark Walker	631	6.34
Stephanie Ferracuti	624	6.27
Dana Humbert	512	5.14
Shawn Rapley	494	4.96
Jessia C. Arsenio	447	4.49
Lesley Young	392	3.94
Kerry-Lee Schultheis	183	1.84

=== Barrhead ===
Mayor

Candidate	Vote	%
Dave McKenzie (X)	1,129	84.5
Liam Sorenson	207	15.5

Council

Candidate	Vote	%
Dave Sawatzky	914	15.32
Dausen Kluin (X)	877	14.70
Ty Assaf (X)	835	14.00
Don Smith (X)	802	13.44
Rod Klumph (X)	765	12.82
Anthony Oswald	560	9.39
Shauna Lynn Zeldenrust	434	7.27
Shannon Harris	393	6.59
Stephen Bablitz	386	6.47

=== Bashaw ===
Mayor

Candidate	Vote	%
Robert McDonald	Acclaimed	

Council

Top four candidates are elected at large

Candidate	Vote	%
Shelley Boileau	57	17.9
Bradley Carlson	76	23.9
Bryan Gust	221	69.5
Michelle Innes	36	11.3
Thomas Lonsdale	58	18.2
Kyle McIntosh	216	67.9
Jackie Northey	207	65.1
Cindy Orom	257	80.8
Carlos Siguenza	24	7.5
Robyn Walker	18	5.7

=== Bassano ===
Mayor

Mayor is elected by Council from amongst its members

Council

Top five candidates are elected at large

Candidate	Vote	%
Irvin Morey (X)	296	16.76
Sydney Miller	276	15.63
Mike Wetzstein	251	14.21
Kevin Jones (X)	247	13.99
John Slomp (X)	236	13.36
Timothy Gourlay	222	12.57
Lynn Royea	132	7.47
Bentley Barnes (X)	106	6.00

=== Beaverlodge ===
Mayor

Candidate	Vote	%
Gary Rycroft (X)	Acclaimed	

Council

Candidate	Vote	%
Gena Jones (X)	335	16.49
Hugh Graw (X)	332	16.34
Calvin Mosher (X)	267	13.14
Judy Kokotilo-Bekkerus (X)	248	12.20
Cody Moulds	238	11.71
Cyndi Corbett (X)	208	10.24
William Martin	140	6.89
Terry Dueck (X)	132	6.50
Victoria Hudson	132	6.50

=== Bentley ===
Mayor

Candidate	Vote	%
Greg Rathjen (X)	Acclaimed	

Council

Top four candidates are elected at large

Candidate	Vote	%
Dale Grimsdale	238	27.17
Pamela Hansen	222	25.34
Lenore Eastman	169	19.29
Brenda Valiquette	130	14.84
Lynda Haarstad-Petten	117	13.36

=== Black Diamond ===
Mayor

Candidate	Vote	%
Brendan Kelly	565	64.72
Ruth Goodwin (X)	308	35.28

Council

Candidate	Vote	%
Heather Thomson	498	12.18
Veronica Kloiber (X)	470	11.49
Ted Bain (X)	432	10.56
Chad Vandenhoek	409	10.00
Andrew Dunning	407	9.95
Daryl Lalonde (X)	393	9.61
Sharon Hart (X)	378	9.24
Colin Fleming	377	9.22
Bradley William Whaling	366	8.95
Randy Brown	359	8.78

=== Blackfalds ===
Mayor

Candidate	Vote	%
Jamie Hoover	522	37.15
Wayne Tutty	507	36.09
Jeff Krehmer	376	26.76

Council

Candidate	Vote	%
Laura Svab (X)	1,017	15.78
Rebecca Stendie (X)	809	12.55
Brenda Dennis	792	12.29
Jim Sands	690	10.70
Amanda Valin	684	10.61
Marina Appel (X)	673	10.44
Will Taylor	660	10.24
Ray Olfert	613	9.51
Edna Coulter	508	7.88

=== Bon Accord ===
Mayor

Candidate	Vote	%
Brian Holden	Acclaimed	

Council

Top four candidates are elected at large

Candidate	Vote	%
Tanya May (X)	259	24.14
Lynn Bidney (X)	240	22.37
Cory Roemer	233	21.71
Lacey Laing (X)	193	17.99
Larissa Gagné	148	13.79

=== Bonnyville ===
Mayor

Candidate	Vote	%
Elisa Brosseau	942	73.88
Duane Zaraska	333	26.12

Council

Candidate	Vote	%
Byron Johnson	627	11.62
Kayla Blanchette	627	11.62
David Shaun	621	11.51
Philip Kushnir	516	9.56
Brian McEvoy (X)	487	9.02
Neil Langridge	475	8.80
Darcy Zelisko	402	7.45
Chadwick Colbourne (X)	371	6.87
Bryan Krawchuk	355	6.58
Trevor Makaruk	274	5.08
Zak Eddamni	259	4.80
Michael Morris	208	3.85
James Dale	175	3.24

=== Bow Island ===
Mayor

Candidate	Vote	%
Gordon Reynolds (X)	Acclaimed	

Council

Candidate	Vote	%
Dave Harrison (X)	Acclaimed	
Roberto Ficius (X)	Acclaimed	
Shannon Strom	Acclaimed	
Terrie Matz (X)	Acclaimed	
Danise Curliss	Acclaimed	
Kim Mitchell	Acclaimed	

=== Bowden ===
Mayor

Candidate	Vote	%
Robb Stuart (X)	246	68.14
Shirley Schultz	115	31.86

Council

Candidate	Vote	%
Paul Webb (X)	247	13.35
Sandy Gamble (X)	204	11.03
Wayne Milaney (X)	203	10.97
Randy Brown (X)	178	9.62
Marie Flowers	176	9.51
Deb Coombes	167	9.03
Carol Pion (X)	156	8.43
Lisa Ouellette	125	6.76
Melissa Braun	111	6.00
Samantha Sharpe	85	4.59
Donnalee Nickerson	82	4.43
Kerry Kelm (X)	80	4.32
Penny de Nevers	36	1.95

=== Bruderheim ===
Mayor

Candidate	Vote	%
Karl Hauch (X)	Acclaimed	

Council

Candidate	Vote	%
George Campbell (X)	Acclaimed	
Len Falardeau (X)	Acclaimed	
Dayna Jacons	Acclaimed	
Wayne Olechow (X)	Acclaimed	
Judy Schueler (X)	Acclaimed	
Ashley Carter	Acclaimed	

=== Calmar ===
Mayor

Candidate	Vote	%
Sean Carnahan	326	59.71
Wally Yachimetz (X)	115	21.06
Kirk Popik	105	19.23

Council

Top four candidates are elected at large

Candidate	Vote	%
Krista Gardner (X)	351	21.13
Carey Benson	279	16.80
Jaime McKeag	266	16.01
Don Faulkner (X)	234	14.09
Terry Balaban (X)	184	11.08
Elke Hemmings	182	10.96
Colin Bremner	165	9.93

=== Canmore ===
Mayor

Candidate	Vote	%
Sean Krausert	3,125	66.07
Vi Sandford	1,346	28.46
Jeff Laidlaw	259	5.48

Council

Candidate	Vote	%
Jeff Mah	3,281	13.95
Tanya Foubert	2,775	11.79
Joanna McCallum (X)	2,771	11.78
Karen Marra (X)	2,322	9.87
Jeff Hilstad (X)	2,245	9.54
Wade Graham	2,174	9.24
Vijay Domingo	1,988	8.45
Jyn San Miguel	1,915	8.14
Rob Seeley (X)	1,891	8.04
Hans Helder	1,215	5.16
Christoph Braier	951	4.04

=== Cardston ===
Mayor

Candidate	Vote	%
Maggie Kronen (X)		
Gerry Selk		
Cinda Spirig		

Council

Candidate	Vote	%
Dennis Barnes (X)		
Paula Brown (X)		
Allan Burton		
Tim Court (X)		
William (Bill) Creed		
John M. Grainger		
Liam Patrick Hastings		
Marsha Jensen		
Jared Kenly		

=== Carstairs ===
Mayor

Candidate	Vote	%
Lance Colby (X)	Acclaimed	

Council

Candidate	Vote	%
Sheldon Ball		
Ryan Bourassa		
Tom Davies		
Angie Fricke		
Bob Greene (X)		
Ron Hoffman		
Rhonda Kraemer-Wise		
Marty Ratz (X)		
Jerry Roberts		
Shannon Wilcox (X)		

=== Castor ===
Mayor

Mayor is elected from town council by its members after the election

Candidate	Vote	%

Council

Top seven candidates are elected at large

Candidate	Vote	%
Michael Bozek		
Richard Elhard (X)		
Anthony Holland		
Trudy Kilner (X)		
Kevin McDougall (X)		
Shawn Peach		
Melanie Robertson		
Donald Sisson		
Brenda Wismer (X)		
Cecil Yates		

=== Claresholm ===
Mayor

Candidate	Vote	%
Doug MacPherson (X)		
Chelsae Petrovic		

Council

Candidate	Vote	%
Kieth Carlson (X)		
Jamie Cutler		
Mike Cutler (X)		
Rod Kettles (X)		
Kandice Meister		
Gaven Moore (X)		
Brad Schlossberger (X)		
Craig Zimmer (X)		

=== Coaldale ===
Mayor

Candidate	Vote	%
Jack Van Rijin	1,729	61.64
Henry Doeve	1,076	38.36

Council

Candidate	Vote	%
Jacen Abrey (X)		
Jason Beekman		
Brad Calder		
Bill Chapman (X)		
Wayne Driver		
Ilja Kraemer		
Jay LaPierre		
Henry (Butch) Pauls (X)		
Dale Pickering		
Lisa Reis		
Jordan Sailor		
Rene van de Vendel		
Clayton Varjassy		

=== Coalhurst ===
Mayor

Candidate	Vote	%
Ronald Lagemaat		
Lyndsay Montina		

Council

Top four candidates are elected at large

Candidate	Vote	%
Scott Akkermans		
john Bordyschuks		
Heather Caldwell (X)		
Taralynn Craig		
Barbara Edgecombe-Green (X)		
Christopher Evetts		
Deborah Florence		
Jesse Potrie		
Brody Prete		
Stan Reynolds		

=== Cochrane ===
Mayor

Candidate	Vote	%
Jeff Genung (X)	Acclaimed	

Council

Candidate	Vote	%
Kaitlin Chamberlain		
Alan Cox		
Paul Crierie		
Brandon Cruze		
Daniel Cunin		
Marni Fedeyko (X)		
Susan Flowers (X)		
Erika Lange		
Tara McFadden (X)		
Ryan McMillan		
Todd Muir		
Alexander Murphy		
Deborah Murphy		
Morgan Nagel (X)		
Samantha Nickerson		
Alex Reed (X)		
Paul Singh		
Bruce Townley		
Patrick Wilson (X)		

=== Coronation ===
Mayor

Mayor is elected from town council by its members after the election

Candidate	Vote	%

Council

Top five candidates are elected at large

Candidate	Vote	%
Brett Alderdice (X)		
Dylan Bullick		
Ronald Checkel (X)		
Cody Hilmer		
Wilfred Noseworthy		
Matthew Peacock		
Mark Stannard (X)		

=== Crossfield ===
Mayor

Candidate	Vote	%

Council

Candidate	Vote	%

=== Daysland ===
Mayor

Candidate	Vote	%

Council

Candidate	Vote	%

=== Devon ===
Mayor

Candidate	Vote	%
Jeff Craddock	986	45.29
Ray Ralph (X)	640	29.40
John Fairhead	339	15.57
Michael Laveck	212	9.74

Council

Candidate	Vote	%
Brian Bowles	1089	
Tanya Hugh (X)	1077	
Anita Fisher	997	
Gurk Dhanoa	948	
Ben Gronberg	846	
Chris Belke	716	
Juston Porter (X)	669	
Mike Hanly	630	
Kayla Fitzpatrick	615	
Stacey R. May (X)	548	
Chris Fish (X)	482	
Serena Grimson	454	
Pat Beaulieu	378	
Andrew Wesa	376	
Chad Griffith	375	
Erick Barba	279	
Andre Grondin	279	
Blake Adams (X)	237	

=== Didsbury ===
Mayor

Candidate	Vote	%
Rhonda Hunter (X)	853	52.01
Erhard Poggemiller	787	47.99

Council

Candidate	Vote	%
Sheree Andrews		
Bill Windsor (X)		
Ethan Williams		
Melynda Crampton		
Berent Hamm		

=== Drayton Valley ===
Mayor

Candidate	Vote	%
Nancy Dodds	1,081	55.92
Corey Peebles	852	44.08

Council

Candidate	Vote	%

=== Drumheller ===
Mayor

Candidate	Vote	%
Heather Colberg (X)	1,444	54.43
Mark Chung	1,116	42.07
Edmund Almond	93	3.51

Council

Candidate	Vote	%
Thomas Victor Zariski (X)		

=== Eckville ===
Mayor

Candidate	Vote	%
Helen Posti (X)		
Colleen Ebden		

Council

Candidate	Vote	%
JacQueline Palm-Fraser		
Karin Engen (X)		
Kevin See (X)		

=== Edson ===
Mayor

Candidate	Vote	%
Kevin Zahara (X)	848	46.19
Janet Wilkinson	663	36.11
Annie Marie Desjarlais	325	17.70

Council

Candidate	Vote	%
Krystal Baier (X)	1,112	
Gean Chouinard (X)	1,071	
Peter Taylor	982	
Trevor Bevan (X)	880	
Greg Pasychny	861	
Ed Moore	841	
Doug Woodhouse	791	
Troy Christian Sorensen (X)	788	
Marsha Jensen	776	
Charl MacPherson	468	

=== Elk Point ===
Mayor

Candidate	Vote	%

Council

Candidate	Vote	%

=== Fairview ===
Mayor

Candidate	Vote	%

Council

Candidate	Vote	%

=== Falher ===
Mayor

Candidate	Vote	%
Donna Buchinski	Acclaimed	

Council

Candidate	Vote	%
Lindsay Brown	Acclaimed	
Robert Lauze	Acclaimed	
Daniel Morin	Acclaimed	
Gaetane Pizycki	Acclaimed	

=== Fort Macleod ===
Mayor

Candidate	Vote	%

Council

Candidate	Vote	%

=== Fox Creek ===
Mayor

Candidate	Vote	%

Council

Candidate	Vote	%

=== Gibbons ===
Mayor

Candidate	Vote	%
Dan Deck	488	63.38
Kendra A. Ball	282	36.62

Council

Candidate	Vote	%
Amber Harris	528	67.87
Loraine Berry	488	62.72
Jaycinth Julian Millante	463	59.51
Norman Sandahl	441	56.68
Darren McCann	437	56.17
Willis Kozak	431	55.40
Jean Woodger	412	52.96

=== Grimshaw ===
Mayor

Candidate	Vote	%

Council

Candidate	Vote	%

=== Hanna ===
Mayor

Candidate	Vote	%

Council

Candidate	Vote	%

=== Hardisty ===
Mayor

Candidate	Vote	%

Council

Candidate	Vote	%

=== High Level ===
Mayor

Candidate	Vote	%

Council

Candidate	Vote	%

=== High Prairie ===
Mayor

Candidate	Vote	%

Council

Candidate	Vote	%

=== High River ===
Mayor

Candidate	Vote	%
Craig Snodgrass (X)	2,625	62.34
Jeff Langford	1,586	37.66

Council

Candidate	Vote	%
Jamie Kinghorn (X)		
Terry G. Coleman		
Rylan Siggelkow		
Jenny Jones		
Kelly Killick-Smit		
Dominick Dodge		
Ken Bayliff		
Brenda Walsh		
Michael Nychyk (X)		
Dominic VonRaven		
David Moretta		
Monty Stafford		
Deborah Gauger		

Referendum

Do you support the Town borrowing up to $15,000,000.00 to expand the existing pool facility?

Choice	Vote	%
No	2,211	54.24
Yes	1,865	45.76

=== Hinton ===
Mayor

Candidate	Vote	%
Marcel Michaels (X)	1,797	65.99
Dewly Nelson	926	34.01

==== By-election ====
A mayoral by-election was held November 16, 2023 following the resignation of Marcel Michaels to take the role of CAO of Consort, Alberta. The results were as follows:

Candidate	Vote	%
Nicholas Nissen	676	57.68
Brian LaBerge	496	42.32

=== Innisfail ===
Mayor

Candidate	Vote	%
Jean Barclay	2,025	76.39
Glen Carritt	626	23.61

Council

Candidate	Vote	%

=== Irricana ===
Mayor

Candidate	Vote	%

Council

Candidate	Vote	%

=== Killam ===
Mayor

Candidate	Vote	%

Council

Candidate	Vote	%

=== Lamont ===
Mayor

Candidate	Vote	%

Council

Candidate	Vote	%

=== Legal ===
Mayor

Candidate	Vote	%

Council

Candidate	Vote	%

=== Magrath ===
Mayor

Candidate	Vote	%

Council

Candidate	Vote	%

=== Manning ===
Mayor

Candidate	Vote	%

Council

Candidate	Vote	%

=== Mayerthorpe ===
Mayor

Candidate	Vote	%

Council

Candidate	Vote	%

=== McLennan ===
Mayor

Candidate	Vote	%

Council

Candidate	Vote	%

=== Milk River ===
Mayor

Candidate	Vote	%

Council

Candidate	Vote	%

=== Millet ===
Mayor

Candidate	Vote	%

Council

Candidate	Vote	%

=== Morinville ===
Mayor

Candidate	Vote	%
Simon Boersma	1,681	64.16
Barry Turner (X)	733	27.98
Shane Ladouceur	206	7.86

Council

Candidate	Vote	%
Alan John Otway		

=== Mundare ===
Mayor

Candidate	Vote	%

Council

Candidate	Vote	%

=== Nanton ===
Mayor

Candidate	Vote	%
Jennifer Handley (X)	651	
Erik Abilgaard	138	

Council

Candidate	Vote	%
Terry Wickett(X)	635	
Kevin Todd	471	
Victor Czop(X)	415	
David Mitchell(X)	409	
Roger Miller	345	
Kenneth Sorenson	340	
Julia Anderson	335	
Amanda Bustard	333	
Dan McLelland (X)	333	
Darcy Slettede	247	
Jennifer Wing	239	
Faren Iwanicha	40	

=== Nobleford ===
Mayor

Candidate	Vote	%

Council

Candidate	Vote	%

=== Okotoks ===
Mayor

Candidate	Vote	%
Tanya Thorn	4,409	59.17
Jeff Reinhart	1,876	25.18
Naydene Lewis	1,166	15.65

Council

Candidate	Vote	%
Gord Lang		
Tassidq Hussain Syed		
Rodney Rene Potrie		
Oliver Hallmark		
Ryan Nix		
James Lee		
Jessica Maurice		

=== Olds ===
Mayor

Candidate	Vote	%
Judy Dahl	1,268	54.80
Michael Ethan Muzychka (X)	1,046	45.20

Council

Candidate	Vote	%

=== Onoway ===
Mayor

Candidate	Vote	%

Council

Candidate	Vote	%

=== Oyen ===
Mayor

Candidate	Vote	%

Council

Candidate	Vote	%

=== Peace River ===
Mayor

Candidate	Vote	%
Elaine Manzer	886	47.28
Normand Boucher	496	26.47
Tom Day	492	26.26

Council

Candidate	Vote	%

=== Penhold ===
Mayor

Candidate	Vote	%

Council

Candidate	Vote	%
Mike Walsh (X)		

=== Picture Butte ===
Mayor

Candidate	Vote	%

Council

Candidate	Vote	%

=== Pincher Creek ===
Mayor

Candidate	Vote	%

Council

Candidate	Vote	%

=== Ponoka ===
Mayor

Candidate	Vote	%
Kevin Ferguson	Acclaimed	

Council

Candidate	Vote	%
Ted Dillon (X)		

=== Provost ===
Mayor

Candidate	Vote	%

Council

Candidate	Vote	%

=== Rainbow Lake ===
Mayor

Candidate	Vote	%

Council

Candidate	Vote	%

=== Raymond ===
Mayor

Candidate	Vote	%
Jim Depew (X)		
Brian Eakett		

Council

Candidate	Vote	%
Bryce Coppieters (X)		
Matt Evans		
Joan Harker (X)		
Ken Heggie (X)		
Kelly Jensen		
Kelvin Kado		
Kate Kindt		
Nicholas Larsen		
Randall Olson		
David Reeve		
Neil Sieben		
Trent Tinney		
Allen Tollestrup		
Ann Williams		

=== Redcliff ===
Mayor

Candidate	Vote	%
Dwight Kilpatrick (X)	656	48.16
Shawna Gale	363	26.65
Ernie Reimer	238	17.47
Mark Payne	105	7.71

Council

Candidate	Vote	%

=== Redwater ===
Mayor

Candidate	Vote	%

Council

Candidate	Vote	%

=== Rimbey ===
Mayor

Candidate	Vote	%

Council

Candidate	Vote	%

=== Rocky Mountain House ===
Mayor

Candidate	Vote	%
Debbie Baich	744	44.29
Tammy Burke (X)	684	40.71
Jeanette Maria de Boer	252	15.00

Council

Candidate	Vote	%

=== Sedgewick ===
Mayor

Candidate	Vote	%

Council

Candidate	Vote	%

=== Sexsmith ===
Mayor

Candidate	Vote	%

Council

Candidate	Vote	%

=== Slave Lake ===
Mayor

Candidate	Vote	%
Tyler Warman (X)	1,064	70.05
Rebecca King	455	29.95

==== By-election ====
A mayoral by-election was held April 3, 2023 following the resignation of Tyler Warman. Results:

Candidate	Vote	%
Francesca Ward	728	87.71
Ron Gariepy	102	12.29

=== Smoky Lake ===
Mayor

Candidate	Vote	%

Council

Candidate	Vote	%

=== Spirit River ===
Mayor

Candidate	Vote	%

Council

Candidate	Vote	%

=== St. Paul ===
Mayor

Candidate	Vote	%
Maureen Miller (X)	Acclaimed	

Council

Candidate	Vote	%

=== Stavely ===
Mayor

Candidate	Vote	%
Gentry Hall (Acclaimed)		

Council

Candidate	Vote	%
Janice Binmore (X)		
Dale (Friday) Gugala (X)		
Tim Martin (X)		
Don Norby (X)		
Michael Varey (X)		
Ramona Whittingham (X)		
Monte Yanosik		

=== Stettler ===
Mayor

Candidate	Vote	%
Sean Nolls (X)	Acclaimed	

Council

Candidate	Vote	%

=== Stony Plain ===
Mayor

Candidate	Vote	%
William Choy (X)	3,126	75.25
Sheldon Gron	1,028	24.75

Council

Candidate	Vote	%
Hughena Burke		
Eric Meyer (X)		

=== Strathmore ===
Mayor

Candidate	Vote	%
Pat Fule (X)	2,019	56.18
Jason Hollingsworth	994	27.66
Lorraine Bauer	486	13.52
Jason Chase	95	2.64

Council

Candidate	Vote	%
Denise Peterson (X)	1672	9.81
Melissa Langmaid	1671	9.81
Jason Montgomery (X)	1544	9.06
Debbie Mitzner	1536	9.01
Brent Wiley	1527	8.96
Richard Wegener	1502	8.82
John Hilton-O’Brien	1373	8.06
Jacy Rapke	1308	7.68
Ken Kuenzl	1297	7.61
Nicole Gibbons	1103	6.47
Brian Cunningham	961	5.64
Craig Vandenberg	941	5.52
Kevin Reynolds	604	3.54

=== Sundre ===
Mayor

Candidate	Vote	%

Council

Candidate	Vote	%

=== Swan Hills ===
Mayor

Candidate	Vote	%

Council

Candidate	Vote	%

=== Sylvan Lake ===
Mayor

Candidate	Vote	%
Megan Hanson	2,876	86.89
Ted Iverson	434	13.11

Council

Candidate	Vote	%
Laura Lauder		
Kjeryn Dakin		
Kendall Kloss		
Jas Payne (X)		

=== Taber ===
Mayor

Candidate	Vote	%
Andrew Prokop (X)	1,058	49.44
Ken Holst	944	44.11
Rick Popadynetz	138	6.45

Council

Candidate	Vote	%
Mark Garner		

=== Thorsby ===
Mayor

Candidate	Vote	%

Council

Candidate	Vote	%

=== Three Hills ===
Mayor

Candidate	Vote	%

Council

Candidate	Vote	%

=== Tofield ===
Mayor

Candidate	Vote	%

Council

Candidate	Vote	%

=== Trochu ===
Mayor

Candidate	Vote	%

Council

Candidate	Vote	%

=== Turner Valley ===
Mayor

Candidate	Vote	%

Council

Candidate	Vote	%

=== Two Hills ===
Mayor

Candidate	Vote	%

Council

Candidate	Vote	%

=== Valleyview ===
Mayor

Candidate	Vote	%

Council

Candidate	Vote	%

=== Vauxhall ===
Mayor

Candidate	Vote	%

Council

Candidate	Vote	%

=== Vegreville ===
Mayor

Candidate	Vote	%
Tim MacPhee (X)	1,427	82.77
Jack Timmermans	297	17.23

Council

Candidate	Vote	%

=== Vermilion ===
Mayor

Candidate	Vote	%

Council

Candidate	Vote	%

=== Viking ===
Mayor

Candidate	Vote	%

Council

Candidate	Vote	%

=== Vulcan ===
Mayor

Candidate	Vote	%

Council

Candidate	Vote	%

=== Wainwright ===
Mayor

Candidate	Vote	%
Bruce Pugh	1,324	78.95
Dan Lapierre	353	21.05

Council

Candidate	Vote	%
Will Challenger (X)		
Bob Foley (X)		
Patrick Moroz (X)		

=== Wembley ===
Mayor

Candidate	Vote	%

Council

Candidate	Vote	%

=== Westlock ===
Mayor

Candidate	Vote	%
Ralph Leriger (X)	Acclaimed	

Council

Candidate	Vote	%

=== Whitecourt ===
Mayor

Candidate	Vote	%
Tom Pickard	848	37.74
Ray Hilts	817	36.36
Darlene Chartrand	582	25.90

Council

Candidate	Vote	%

== Specialized municipalities ==
The following are the municipalities incorporated as specialized municipalities in Alberta that will vote in the 2021 Alberta Municipal election. Incumbents are marked by an X.

=== Lac La Biche County ===
Mayor

Candidate	Vote	%
Paul Reutov	1,065	32.64
Arlene Hrynyk	815	24.98
George L'Heureux	770	23.60
Omer Moghrabi (X)	613	18.79

Council

Candidate	Vote	%
Ward 1
Darlene Beniuk (X)		
Ward 2
Liz Shaffer		
Ward 3
Ward 4
Ward 5
Ward 6
Ward 7
Colin Cote (X)		
Lorin Tkachuk		

=== Mackenzie County ===
Reeve

Mackenzie County’s reeve is not elected at large; rather the reeve is chosen by its own elected council members.

Council

Candidate	Vote	%
Ward 1
Ward 2
Ward 3
Ward 4
Ward 5
Ward 6
Ward 7
Ward 8
Ward 9
Ward 10

=== Municipality of Crowsnest Pass ===
Mayor

Candidate	Vote	%
Blair Painter (X)	Acclaimed	

Council

Top six candidates are elected at large

Candidate	Vote	%

=== Municipality of Jasper ===
Mayor

Candidate	Vote	%

Council

Top six candidates are elected at large

Candidate	Vote	%

=== Regional Municipality of Wood Buffalo ===
Mayor

Candidate	Vote	%
Sandy Bowman	5,690	44.85
Verna Murphy	4,119	32.46
Mike Allen	2,879	22.69

Council

In multi-member wards, the percentages shown are percentages of votes cast, not percentages of voters who voted.

Candidate	Vote	%
Ward 1 - top six to be elected, through Plurality block voting
Funky Banjoko	4,788	8.59
M. Shafiq Dogar	4,379	7.86
Lance Bussieres	4,361	7.83
Keith McGrath (X)	3,999	7.18
Ken Ball	3,636	6.53
Allan Grandison	3,040	5.46
Jason King	3,036	5.45
Jeffrey Peddle (X)	2,948	5.29
Rene Wells	2,769	4.97
I. J. Uche-Ezeala	2,625	4.71
Michelle Landsiedel	2,491	4.47
Alex McKenzie	2,168	3.89
Jennifer Vardy	2,110	3.79
Gareth Norris	1,663	2.98
Garth Hewitt	1,582	2.84
Joseph Mugodo	1,526	2.74
Charles Wilson	1,394	2.50
Zaid Sulaiman	1,339	2.40
Jonathan Gregory Higdon	1,232	2.21
Scott Wilson	1,176	2.11
Dale Leo Bendfeld	1,098	1.97
Matty Parlee	838	1.50
Mike Powlesland	763	1.37
Tal Tupper	761	1.37
Ward 2 - top two to be elected, through Plurality block voting
Kendrick Cardinal	243	36.99
Loretta Eva Waquan	208	31.66
Claris Voyageur (X)	206	31.35
Ward 3 - one to be elected, through First-past-the-post voting
Stu Wigle	233	64.01
Sheila Lalonde (X)	131	35.99
Ward 4 - one to be elected, through First-past-the-post voting
Jane Stroud (X)	Acclaimed	

=== Strathcona County ===
Mayor

Candidate	Vote	%
Rod Frank (X)	17,571	57.91
Dave Quest	5,539	18.26
Al Biel	3,402	11.21
Annie McKitrick	3,343	11.02
David Dixon	487	1.61

Council

Candidate	Vote	%
Ward 1
Robert Parks (X)	1,912	46.37
Ray McCartney	833	20.20
Paul Wielens	790	19.16
Doug Best	588	14.26
Ward 2
Dave Anderson (X)	3,038	69.01
Leonard Goulet	1,364	30.99
Ward 3
Lorne Harvey	2,024	52.52
Brian Botterill (X)	1,263	32.77
Teunis Kruger	567	14.71
Ward 4
Bill Tonita (X)	2,792	62.61
Hugh Bell	1,392	31.22
Isaac Cameron	275	6.17
Ward 5
Aaron C. Nelson	1,190	42.38
Daryl Marler	840	29.91
Leighton Larson	670	23.86
Ken Timperley	108	3.85
Ward 6
Corey-Ann Hartwick	1,39	46.54
Alan Dunn	965	33.54
Vaun Gage	573	19.92
Ward 7
Glen Lawrence (X)	1,213	47.93
Harvey Grabill	715	28.25
Dylan Bohaychuk	603	23.82
Ward 8
Katie Berghofer (X)	2,877	62.65
Rahat Abdulla	1,715	37.35

== Municipal districts ==
=== Athabasca County ===
Athabasca County elects its reeve from among its nine council members.

=== County of Barrhead No. 11 ===
The County of Barrhead No. 11 elects its reeve from among its seven council members.

=== Beaver County ===
Beaver County elects its reeve from among its five council members.

=== Big Lakes County ===
Big Lakes County elects its reeve from among its nine council members.

=== Municipal District of Bonnyville No. 87 ===
Reeve candidate	Vote	%
Barry Kalinski	2,227	54.28
Greg Sawchuk (X)	1,876	45.72

=== Brazeau County ===
Reeve candidate	Vote	%
Bart Guyon (X)	1,673	58.09
Jason Kennedy	986	34.24
Don Mosicki	221	7.67

=== Camrose County ===
Camrose County elects its reeve from among its seven council members.

=== Clearwater County ===
Clearwater County elects its reeve from among its seven council members.

=== Cypress County ===
Cypress County elects its reeve from among its nine council members.

=== Foothills County ===
Foothills County elects its mayor from among its seven council members.

=== County of Grande Prairie No. 1 ===
The County of Grande Prairie No. 11 elects its mayor from among its nine council members.

=== Municipal District of Greenview No. 16 ===
The Municipal District of Greenview No. 16 elects its reeve from among its nine council members.

=== Kneehill County ===
Kneehill County elects its reeve from among its seven council members.

=== Lac Ste. Anne County ===
Lac Ste. Anne County elects its mayor from among its seven council members.

=== Lacombe County ===
Lacombe County elects its reeve from among its seven council members.

=== Leduc County ===
Leduc County elects its mayor from among its seven council members.

=== Lethbridge County ===
Lethbridge County elects its reeve from among its seven council members.

=== Mountain View County ===
Mounatain View County elects its reeve from among its seven council members.

=== County of Newell ===
The County of Newell elects its reeve from among its ten council members.

=== Parkland County ===
Mayoral candidate	Vote	%
Allan Gamble	2,889	38.33
Kathy Rondeau	2,005	26.60
Donald J. Heron	1,927	25.56
Jerry Molnar	717	9.51

=== Ponoka County ===
Ponoka County elects its reeve from among its five council members.

=== Red Deer County ===
Mayoral candidate	Vote	%
Jim Wood (X)	2,623	43.88
Stan Bell	1,751	29.30
Ty Northcott	1,603	26.82

=== Rocky View County ===
Council

Rocky View County's council elects the reeve from among the seven of themselves after the election.

Candidate	Vote	%
Division 1
Kevin Robert Hanson (X)	1,024	58.41
Brent Moore	729	41.59
Division 2
Don Kochan	1,022	56.46
Kim McKylor (X)	788	43.54
Division 3
Crystal Kissel (X)	806	52.03
Jolene Airth	743	47.97
Division 4
Samanntha Wright (X)	808	42.57
Roc Spence	757	39.88
Dan Henn (X)	333	17.54
Division 5
Greg Boehlke (X)	707	40.89
Mark Jette	437	25.27
Ted Francois	389	22.50
John McMurray	196	11.34
Division 6
Sunny Samra	969	48.94
Rolly Ashdown	452	22.83
Jerry Gautreau (X)	450	22.73
Jeremy Stinson	109	5.51
Division 7
Al Schule (X)	677	59.54
Alysha Bates	460	40.46

=== County of Stettler No. 6 ===
The County of Stettler No. 6 elects its reeve from among its seven council members.

=== County of St. Paul No. 19 ===
Reeve candidate	Vote	%
Glen Ockerman	1,270	51.42
Yvonne Weinmeier	1,200	48.58

=== Sturgeon County ===
Mayoral candidate	Vote	%
Alanna Hnatiw (X)	Acclaimed	

=== Municipal District of Taber ===
The Municipal District of Taber elects its reeve from among its seven council members.

=== County of Vermilion River ===
The County of Vermilion River elects its reeve from among its seven council members.

=== Westlock County ===
Westlock County elects its reeve from among its seven council members.

=== County of Wetaskiwin No. 10 ===
The County of Wetaskiwin No. 10 elects its reeve from among its seven council members.

=== Wheatland County ===
Wheatland County elects its reeve from among its seven council members.

Candidate	Vote	%
Division 1
Shannon Laprise	147	49.66%
Erich Hoff	87	29.39%
Allen Grant MacLennan	42	14.19%
Janet Kanters-Shmorong	20	6.76%
Division 2
Amber Link (X)	Acclaimed	
Division 3
Donna Biggar (X)	Acclaimed	
Division 4
Tom Ikert (X)	Acclaimed	
Division 5
Scott James Klassen (X)	428	78.10%
Brenda Knight	120	21.90%
Division 6
Glenn Koester (X)	253	77.37%
Rex Harwood	56	17.13%
Ginette Motta	18	5.50%
Division 7
Rick Laursen	140	56.91%
Einar B Davison	60	24.39%
Herb McLane	46	18.70%

=== Municipal District of Willow Creek No. 26 ===
The Municipal District of Willow Creek No. 26 elects its reeve from among its seven council members.

=== Yellowhead County ===
Mayoral candidate	Vote	%
Wade Williams	1,254	40.75
Doug Elzinga	954	31.00
Sandra Cherniawsky	591	19.21
Sonja Christopher	221	7.18
Ken Bitz	57	1.85
