= Tara Veer =

Canadian politician

25th Mayor of Red Deer
- In office October 29, 2013 – October 25, 2021
- Preceded by: Morris Flewwelling
- Succeeded by: Ken Johnston

Member of the Red Deer City Council
- In office October 26, 2004 – October 29, 2013
- Preceded by: Not applicable
- Succeeded by: Not applicable

Personal details
- Born: December 29, 1977 (age 48) Red Deer, Alberta
- Education: Queen's University (BA); Red Deer College

Tara Veer is a Canadian politician, who was elected mayor of Red Deer, Alberta in the 2013 municipal election. She was the youngest mayor at age 35, and the second woman in the city's history, after Gail Surkan, to be elected mayor of the city.

Prior to her election as mayor, Veer served on the Red Deer City Council for nine years.

Veer was re-elected against challenger Sean Burke in the 2017 municipal election.

Veer did not seek re-election in the 2021 municipal election, and was succeeded by Ken Johnston.
