= 2013 Alberta municipal elections =

- October 21, 2013
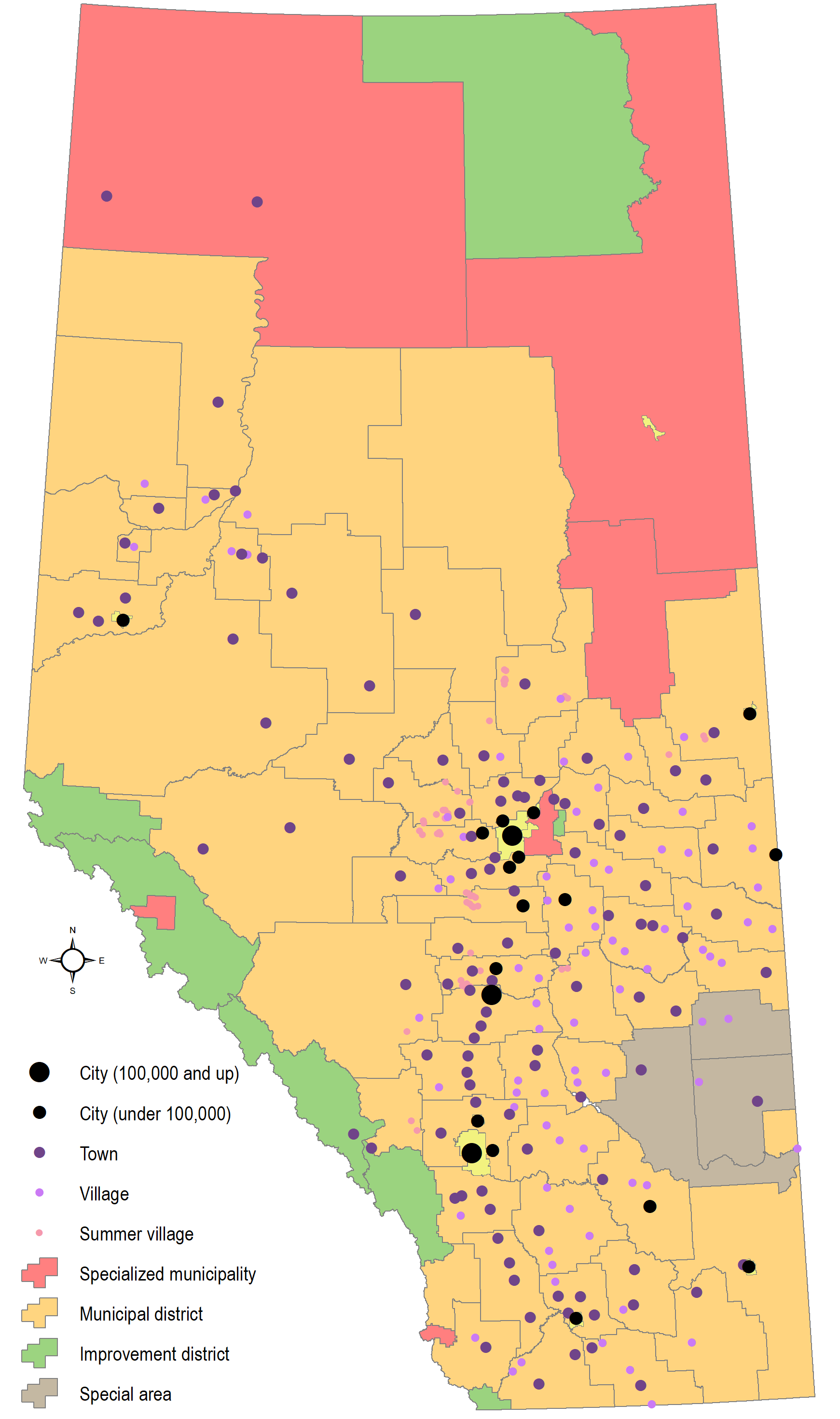
- Alberta's 344 municipalities (19 cities, 106 towns, 80 villages, 51 summer villages, 6 specialized municipalities, 63 municipal districts, 7 improvement districts, and 3 special areas) as of July 2021

Municipal elections were held in Alberta, Canada on Monday, October 21, 2013. Mayors (reeves), councillors (aldermen), and trustees were elected to office in 16 of the 17 cities, all 108 towns, all 93 villages, all 5 specialized municipalities, all 64 municipal districts, 3 of the 8 improvement districts, and the advisory councils of the 3 special areas. The City of Lloydminster is on the Saskatchewan schedule (quadrennial), and held elections on October 24, 2012, while 5 improvement districts (Nos. 12, 13, 24, 25, and 349) have no councils and are led solely by the Minister of Municipal Affairs. Since the 2010 municipal elections, portions of Lac La Biche County and the Regional Municipality of Wood Buffalo formed Improvement District No. 349, and the villages of New Norway and Tilley were dissolved. From 1968 to 2013, provincial legislation has required every municipality to hold elections every three years. The Alberta Legislative Assembly passed a bill on December 5, 2012, amending the Local Authorities Election Act. Starting with the 2013 elections, officials are elected for a four-year term, and municipal elections are moved to a four-year cycle.

== Cities ==
The following are the elections for all Alberta cities. Bold indicates elected, and incumbents are italicized.

=== Airdrie ===
Citizens of Airdrie will elect six at large councillors. No mayoral election will be held due to Peter Brown being acclaimed.

Mayoral race

Candidate	Vote	%
**Peter Brown**	**Acclaimed**	

=== Brooks ===
Citizens of Brooks will elect one mayor and six at large councillors.

Mayoral race

Candidate	Vote	%
**Martin Shields**	1,879	72.38
Priscilla Petersen	483	18.61
Loran Casimere Fells	234	9.01

Mayoral by-election (held January 18, 2016)

Candidate	Vote	%
**Barry Morishita**	1,561	64.03
Sarah Bisbee	877	35.97

=== Calgary ===
In the 2013 elections, the citizens of Calgary elected one mayor, 14 councillors (one from each of 14 wards), the seven Calgary School District trustees (each representing 2 of 14 wards), and five of the seven Calgary Catholic School District trustees (each representing 2 of 14 wards).

=== Camrose ===
Citizens of Camrose will elect one mayor and eight at large councillors.

Mayoral race

Candidate	Vote	%
**Norman Mayer**	2,137	47.75
Russell David Hawkins	1,667	37.25
Mike Morris	671	14.99

=== Cold Lake ===
Citizens of Cold Lake will elect six at large councillors. No mayoral election will be held due to Craig Copeland being acclaimed.

Mayoral race

Candidate	Vote	%
**Craig Copeland**	**Acclaimed**	

=== Edmonton ===
In the 2013 elections, the citizens of Edmonton elected one mayor, 12 councillors (one from each of 12 wards), seven of the nine Edmonton Public Schools trustees (one from each of nine wards), and the seven Edmonton Catholic School District trustees (one from each of seven wards).

=== Fort Saskatchewan ===
Citizens of Fort Saskatchewan will elect one mayor and six at large councillors.

Mayoral race

Candidate	Vote	%
**Gale Katchur**	3,481	67.08
Don Morgan	1,708	32.92

=== Grande Prairie ===
Citizens of Grande Prairie will elect one mayor and eight at large councillors.

Mayoral race

Candidate	Vote	%
**Bill Given**	6,194	73.01
Gladys Blackmore	2,290	26.99

=== Lacombe ===
Citizens of Lacombe will elect one mayor and six at large councillors.

Mayoral race

Candidate	Vote	%
**Steve Christie**	1,662	50.97
Grant Creasey	1,599	49.03

=== Leduc ===
Citizens of Leduc will elect one mayor and six at large aldermen (councillors).

Mayoral race

Candidate	Vote	%
**Greg Krischke**	3,546	77.90
Mahnaz Rahmani	1,006	22.10

=== Lethbridge ===
In the 2013 elections, the citizens of Lethbridge elected one mayor, eight councillors (all at large), the seven Lethbridge School District No. 51 trustees, and five of the Holy Spirit Roman Catholic Separate Regional Division No. 4's nine trustees (as Ward 2). This election marks a change of title for council members from "alderman" to "councillor".

=== Medicine Hat ===
Citizens of Medicine Hat will elect one mayor and eight at large councillors.

Mayoral race

Candidate	Vote	%
**Ted Clugston**	10,192	50.69
Phil Turnbull	4,955	24.64
Milvia Bauman	3,602	17.91
Norm Boucher	1,358	6.75

=== Red Deer ===
In the 2013 elections, the citizens of Red Deer elected one mayor, eight councillors (all at large), the seven Red Deer School District No. 104 trustees (at large), and five of the Red Deer Catholic Regional Division No. 39's seven trustees (as Red Deer Ward). They also voted to not implement a ward system in a plebiscite.

Mayoral race

Candidate	Vote	%
**Tara Veer**	**9,400**	**46.4**
Cindy Jefferies	7,971	39.4
Dennis Trepanier	1,514	7.5
William (Joe) Horn	951	4.7
Chad Mason	409	2.0

=== Spruce Grove ===
Citizens of Spruce Grove will elect one mayor and six at large aldermen (councillors).

Mayoral race

Candidate	Vote	%
**Stuart Houston**	3,244	64.78
Dan Saunders	1,764	35.22

=== St. Albert ===
Citizens of St. Albert will elect one mayor and six at large councillors.

Mayoral race

Candidate	Vote	%
**Nolan Crouse**	9,900	55.12
Shelley Biermanski	8,061	44.88

=== Wetaskiwin ===
Citizens of Wetaskiwin will elect one mayor and six at large aldermen (councillors).

Mayoral race

Candidate	Vote	%
**Bill Elliot**	1,867	55.68
Mark McFaul	1,486	44.32

== Towns ==
The following are the elections for Alberta towns with a population over 5,000. Bold indicates elected, and incumbents are italicized.

=== Banff ===
Citizens of Banff will elect one mayor and six at large councillors.

Mayoral race

Candidate	Vote	%
**Karen Sorensen**	946	50.86
Jim Abelseth	703	37.80
Cynthia Anderson	211	11.34

=== Beaumont ===
Citizens of Beaumont will elect one mayor and six at large councillors.

Mayoral race

Candidate	Vote	%
**Camille Bérubé**	**1,799**	**57.27**
Gil Poitras	1,184	37.70
K. C. MacPherson	158	5.03

=== Blackfalds ===
Citizens of Blackfalds will elect one mayor and six at large councillors.

Mayoral race

Candidate	Vote	%
**Melodie Stol**	519	67.49
Wayne Tutty	250	32.51

=== Bonnyville ===
Citizens of Bonnyville will elect one mayor and six at large councillors.

Mayoral race

Candidate	Vote	%
**Gene Sobolewski**	499	49.65
Ernie Isley	375	37.31
Brent Boulrice	131	13.03

=== Canmore ===
Citizens of Canmore will elect one mayor and six at large councillors.

Mayoral race

Candidate	Vote	%
**John Borrowman**	2,593	78.15
Hans Helder	672	20.25
Caleb McMillan	53	1.60

=== Chestermere ===
Citizens of Chestermere will elect six at large councillors. No mayoral election will be held due to Patricia Matthews being acclaimed.

Mayoral race

Candidate	Vote	%
**Patricia Matthews**	**Acclaimed**	

=== Coaldale ===
Citizens of Coaldale will elect one mayor and six at large councillors.

Mayoral race

Candidate	Vote	%
**Kim Craig**	1,065	57.57
Butch Pauls	785	42.43

=== Cochrane ===
Citizens of Cochrane will elect one mayor and six at large councillors.

Mayoral race

Candidate	Vote	%
**Ivan Brooker**	1,856	41.06
Joann Churchill	1,432	31.68
David Smith	1,232	27.26

Morgan Justice Nagel was also elected as the youngest of the six councillors, of 13 candidates, becoming the youngest councillor in Cochrane at 23 years old.

=== Devon ===
Citizens of Devon will elect one mayor and six at large councillors.

Mayoral race

Candidate	Vote	%
**Stephen Lindop**	919	46.25
Anita Fisher	627	31.56
Sheila Aitken	441	22.19

=== Drayton Valley ===
Citizens of Drayton Valley will elect one mayor and six at large councillors.

Mayoral race

Candidate	Vote	%
**Glenn McLean**	917	49.59
Kyle Archer	556	30.07
Carol Lapointe	376	20.34

=== Drumheller ===
Citizens of Drumheller will elect six at large councillors. No mayoral election will be held due to Terry Yemen being acclaimed.

Mayoral race

Candidate	Vote	%
**Terry Yemen**	**Acclaimed**	

=== Edson ===
Citizens of Edson will elect one mayor and six at large councillors.

Mayoral race

Candidate	Vote	%
**Greg Pasychny**	1,454	85.18
Robert Wilkinson	253	14.82

=== High River ===
Citizens of High River will elect one mayor and six at large councillors.

Mayoral race

Candidate	Vote	%
**Craig Lyle Snodgrass**	3,024	76.09
Jamie Kinghorn	950	23.91

=== Hinton ===
Citizens of Hinton will elect one mayor and six at large councillors.

Mayoral race

Candidate	Vote	%
**Rob Mackin**	2,154	76.57
Bill Bulger	659	23.43

=== Innisfail ===
Citizens of Innisfail will elect six at large councillors. No mayoral election will be held due to Brian Spiller being acclaimed.

Mayoral race

Candidate	Vote	%
**Brian Spiller**	**Acclaimed**	

=== Morinville ===
Citizens of Morinville will elect one mayor and six at large councillors.

Mayoral race

Candidate	Vote	%
**Lisa Holmes**	1,034	43.89
Sheldon Fingler	1,016	43.12
Carrie Foss	294	12.48
Christa Naughton	12	0.51

=== Okotoks ===
Citizens of Okotoks will elect one mayor and six at large councillors.

Mayoral race

Candidate	Vote	%
**Bill Robertson**	2,652	57.79
Larry Albrecht	1,937	42.21

=== Olds ===
Citizens of Olds will elect one mayor and six at large councillors.

Mayoral race

Candidate	Vote	%
**Judy Dahl**	1,366	73.52
Art Baker	450	24.22
Shirley Schultz	42	2.26

=== Peace River ===
Citizens of Peace River will elect one mayor and six at large councillors.

Mayoral race

Candidate	Vote	%
**Tom Tarpey**	1,401	78.05
Lorne Mann	394	21.95

=== Ponoka ===
Citizens of Ponoka will elect one mayor and six at large councillors.

Mayoral race

Candidate	Vote	%
**Rick Bonnett**	960	50.03
Doug Gill	959	49.97

=== Redcliff ===
Citizens of Redcliff will elect one mayor and six at large councillors.

Mayoral race

Candidate	Vote	%
**Ernie Reimer**	601	55.65
Robert Hazelaar	479	44.35

=== Rocky Mountain House ===
Citizens of Rocky Mountain House will elect one mayor and six at large councillors.

Mayoral race

Candidate	Vote	%
**Fred Nash**	773	54.78
Sheila Mizera	433	30.69
Jim Bague	205	14.53

=== Slave Lake ===
Citizens of Slave Lake will elect six at large councillors. No mayoral election will be held due to Tyler Warman being elected with no opposition.

Mayoral race

Candidate	Vote	%
**Tyler Warman**	**Acclaimed**	

=== Stettler ===
Citizens of Sttetler will elect six at large councillors. No mayoral election will be held due to Dick Richards being elected with no opposition.

Mayoral race

Candidate	Vote	%
**Dick Richards**	**Acclaimed**	

=== Stony Plain ===
Citizens of Stony Plain will elect six at large councillors. No mayoral election will be held due to William Choy being acclaimed.

Mayoral race

Candidate	Vote	%
**William Choy**	**Acclaimed**	

=== St. Paul ===
Citizens of St. Paul will elect six at large councillors. No mayoral election will be held due to Glenn Andersen being elected with no opposition.

Mayoral race

Candidate	Vote	%
**Glenn Andersen**	**Acclaimed**	

=== Strathmore ===
Citizens of Strathmore will elect one mayor and six at large councillors.

Mayoral race

Candidate	Vote	%
**Michael Ell**	1,513	59.64
Steve Grajczyk	1,024	40.36

=== Sylvan Lake ===
Citizens of Sylvan Lake will elect one mayor and six at large councillors.

Mayoral race

Candidate	Vote	%
**Sean McIntyre**	1966	71.67
Susan Samson	678	24.72
Melesa Starchesk	99	3.61

=== Taber ===
Citizens of Taber will elect one mayor and six at large councillors.

Mayoral race

Candidate	Vote	%
**Henk De Vlieger**	1,041	59.62
Ray Bryant	705	40.38

=== Vegreville ===
Citizens of Vegreville will elect one mayor and six at large councillors.

Mayoral race

Candidate	Vote	%
**Myron Hayduk**	1,543	74.33
Natalia Toroshenko	292	14.07
Jenny Cooper	241	11.61

=== Wainwright ===
Citizens of Wainwright will elect six at large councillors. No mayoral election will be held due to Brian Bethune being elected with no opposition.

Mayoral race

Candidate	Vote	%
**Brian Bethune**	**Acclaimed**	

=== Whitecourt ===
Citizens of Whitecourt will elect one mayor and six at large councillors.

Mayoral race

Candidate	Vote	%
**Maryann Irene Chichak**	**1,091**	**59.78**
Trevor Thain	734	40.22

Bold indicates elected, and incumbents are italicized.

== Specialized municipalities ==
The following are the elections for Alberta specialized municipalities with a population over 5,000, which include the urban service areas of Fort McMurray and Sherwood Park.

=== Crowsnest Pass ===
In the 2013 elections, the citizens of Crowsnest Pass will elect one mayor, and six at large councillors.

Mayoral race

Candidate	Vote	%
Blair Painter	2,065	76.94
Bruce Vernon Decoux	467	17.40
John Prince	152	5.66

=== Mackenzie County ===
In the 2013 elections, the citizens of Mackenzie County were to elect ten councillors (one from each of ten wards). As six of them were acclaimed, citizens of wards 1, 3, 7 and 9 will elect the remaining four councillors.

=== Strathcona County ===
In the 2013 elections, the citizens of Strathcona County elected one mayor, eight councillors (one from each of eight wards), five of the Elk Island Public Schools Regional Division No. 14's nine trustees (three from Sherwood Park, one from Strathcona County north, and one from Strathcona County south), and four of the Elk Island Catholic Separate Regional Division No. 41's seven trustees (supporters in Sherwood Park).

=== Wood Buffalo ===
In the 2013 elections, the citizens of the Regional Municipality of Wood Buffalo elected one mayor, ten councillors (from four wards), the five Fort McMurray Public School District trustees (in Fort McMurray), five of the Northland School Division No. 61's 22 school boards (outside Fort McMurray, three or five trustees each), and the five Fort McMurray Catholic School District trustees (in Fort McMurray).

== Municipal districts ==
The following are the election results for Alberta municipal districts (counties) with a population over 5,000 and have an elected mayor or reeve position. Bold indicates elected, and incumbents are italicized.

=== Bonnyville No. 87 ===
Citizens of the Municipal District of Bonnyville No. 87 will elect six councillors from six wards.

Reeve race

Candidate	Vote	%
**Ed Rondeau**	1,306	66.29
Erwin Thompson	664	33.71

=== Brazeau County ===
Citizens of Brazeau County will elect six councillors from six divisions.

Reeve race

Candidate	Vote	%
**Pat Vos**	1,325	58.24
Bart Guyon	950	41.76

=== Lac La Biche County ===
Citizens of Lac La Biche County will elect seven councillors from seven wards.

Mayoral race

Candidate	Vote	%
**Aurel Langevin**	1,195	47.40
Gail Ludwig-Broadbent	1,139	45.18
Karen Young	187	7.42

=== Red Deer County ===
Citizens of Red Deer County will elect six councillors from six divisions. No mayoral election will be held due to Jim Wood being acclaimed.

Mayoral race

Candidate	Vote	%
**Jim Wood**	**Acclaimed**	

=== St. Paul County No. 19 ===
Citizens of the County of St. Paul No. 19 will elect six councillors from six divisions.

Mayoral race

Candidate	Vote	%
**Steve Upham**	1,104	46.48
Ray Danyluk	1,062	44.72
Ben Dyck	209	8.80

=== Yellowhead County ===
Citizens of Yellowhead County elected eight councillors from eight wards.

Mayoral race

Candidate	Vote	%
**Gerald Soroka**	1,226	52.51
Roxanne Scherger	882	37.77
Dallas Haywood	227	9.72

== See also ==
- Alberta municipal censuses, 2013
- Alberta municipal censuses, 2014
- List of municipalities in Alberta
