= 2021 census =

2021 census may refer to:

- 2021 Alberta municipal censuses
- 2021 Australian census
- 2021 Canadian census
- 2021 Croatian census
- 2021 Czech census
- 2021 Greek census
- 2021 population census in Hong Kong
- 2021 census of India
- 2021 Nepal census
- 2021 Polish census
- 2021 Russian census
- 2021 United Kingdom census
