= Ernest Newman (politician) =

Canadian politician

Ernest E. Newman served as Mayor of Red Deer, Alberta from 1961 until his resignation in 1965. Before being elected as mayor in 1961 to succeed a retiring J. M. McAfee, Newman had been the city's commissioner.

Born in London in 1914, he moved to Canada in 1940. He died in 1977.
