= 2021 Alberta municipal censuses =

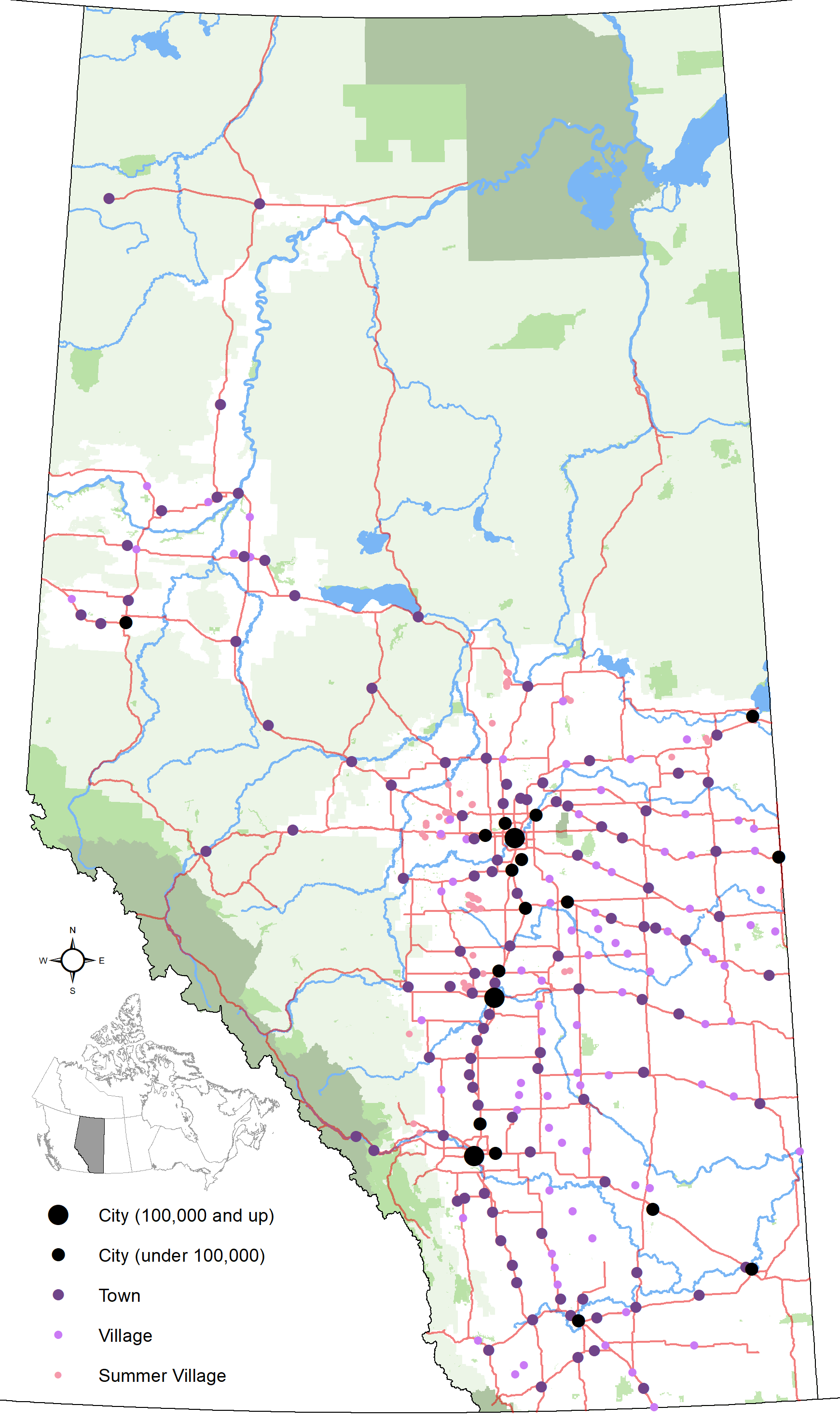
- Distribution of Alberta's 260 urban municipalities

Alberta has provincial legislation allowing its municipalities to conduct municipal censuses. Municipalities choose to conduct their own censuses for multiple reasons such as to better inform municipal service planning and provision or to simply update their populations since the last federal census.

Alberta began the year of 2021 with 345 municipalities, which decreased to 343 with the dissolutions of Improvement District No. 349 on May 1 and the Village of Hythe on July 1. Of these, the only two municipalities to conduct a municipal census in 2021 were the Town of Blackfalds and the Regional Municipality (RM) of Wood Buffalo.

== Municipal census results ==
The following summarizes the results of the two municipal censuses conducted in 2021.

2021 municipal census summary				2016 federal census comparison				Previous municipal census comparison			
Municipality	Status	Census date	2021 pop.	2016 pop.	Absolute growth	Absolute change	Annual growth rate	Prev. pop.	Prev. census year	Absolute growth	Annual growth rate
Blackfalds	Town	March 1, 2021	11,015	9,328	1,687	18.1%	3.4%	10,125	2018	890	−2.8%
RM of Wood Buffalo	Specialized municipality	April 1, 2021	75,555	71,589	3,966	5.5%	1.1%	75,009	2018	546	0.2%

== Breakdowns ==
=== Urban and rural service areas ===
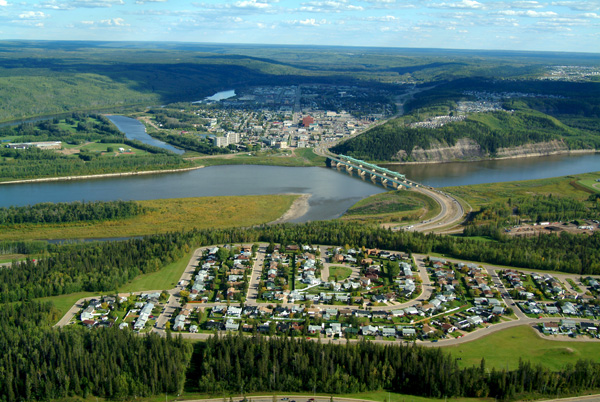
Fort McMurray is the Regional Municipality of Wood Buffalo's urban service area.

2021 municipal census summary		2018 municipal census comparison		
Area	2021 population	Previous population	Absolute growth	Annual growth rate
Fort McMurray urban service area (Note: The Fort McMurray urban service area is deemed equivalent to a city.)	72,917	72,056	861	0.4%
Rural service area (Note: The RM of Wood Buffalo's rural service area is deemed equivalent to a municipal district.)	2,638	2,953	−315	−3.7%
Total RM of Wood Buffalo	75,555	75,009	546	0.2%

=== Hamlets ===
The following is a list of hamlet populations determined by the 2021 municipal census conducted by the RM of Wood Buffalo, excluding the Fort McMurray urban service area that is presented above.

2021 municipal census summary			Previous municipal census comparison			
Hamlet	Municipality	2021 population	Previous population	Previous census year	Absolute growth	Annual growth rate
Anzac	RM of Wood Buffalo	555	659	2018	−104	−5.6%
Conklin	RM of Wood Buffalo	178	229	2018	−51	−8.1%
Fort Chipewyan	RM of Wood Buffalo	847	918	2018	−71	−2.6%
Fort MacKay	RM of Wood Buffalo	57	59	2018	−2	−1.1%
Gregoire Lake Estates	RM of Wood Buffalo	217	204	2018	13	2.1%
Janvier	RM of Wood Buffalo	77	141	2018	−64	−18.3%
Saprae Creek	RM of Wood Buffalo	658	715	2018	−57	−2.7%

== Shadow population ==
Alberta Municipal Affairs defines shadow population as "temporary residents of a municipality who are employed by an industrial or commercial establishment in the municipality for a minimum of 30 days within a municipal census year." The RM of Wood Buffalo conducted a shadow population count in 2021. The following presents the results of this count for comparison with its concurrent municipal census results.

Municipality	Status	Municipal census population	Shadow population	Combined population
RM of Wood Buffalo	Specialized municipality	75,555	30,504	106,059

== See also ==
- 2021 Alberta municipal elections
- List of communities in Alberta
