= Cindy Jefferies (politician) =

Canadian politician

Her Worship Cindy Jefferies

27th Mayor of Red Deer
- Incumbent
- Assumed office November 3, 2025
- Preceded by: Ken Johnston

Personal details
- Education: University of Calgary

Cindy Jefferies is a Canadian politician who has been mayor of Red Deer, Alberta, since 2025. She previously served as a city councillor from 2004 to 2013, and again from 2021 to 2025. Jefferies was previously a local school board trustee and candidate for mayor in 2013, losing to Tara Veer.
