= List of mayors of Red Deer, Alberta =

Mayor of Red Deer, Alberta
- Incumbent; Cindy Jefferies since November 3, 2025
- Term length: 4 years
- Formation: 1901
- First holder: Raymond Leonard Gaetz

This is a list of the Mayors of Red Deer, Alberta. In all countries of the Commonwealth, mayors are awarded the title of His/Her Worship. Currently, elections for the office of mayor take place every four years on the third Monday in October, the next occurring in 2029.

== Mayors of the Town of Red Deer (1901–1913) ==
- 1901–1903 Raymond Leonard Gaetz
- 1903–1904 The Rev. George A. Love
- 1904–1906 Edward Michener
- 1906–1908 Halley H. Gaetz
- 1908–1909 William J. Botterill
- 1909–1910 Samuel E. McKee
- 1910–1912 Robert B. Welliver
- 1912–1913 Francis Wright Galbraith

== Mayors of the City of Red Deer ==
- 1913 Francis Wright Galbraith
- 1913–1914 Stanley N. Carscallen
- 1914–1916 John A. Carswell
- 1916–1918 George Smith
- 1918–1920 William E. Lord
- 1920–1924 Dr. John Collison
- 1924–1927 Edgar G. Johns
- 1927–1930 Dr. Harold J. Snell
- 1930–1932 Fred Turnbull
- 1932–1936 W. Peter Code
- 1936–1944 Edward S. Hogg
- 1944–1947 Harvey W. Halladay
- 1947–1949 Dr. Charles R. Bunn
- 1949–1951 John V. Bettenson
- 1951–1953 Paul Crawford
- 1953–1955 Harvey W. Halladay
- 1955–1961 Jack M. McAfee
- 1961–1965 Ernest Newman (resigned from office)
- 1965 F.B. Moore (pro tempore)
- 1965–1974 R. E. Barrett
- 1974–1977 Roy McGregor
- 1977–1980 Ken Curle
- 1980–1992 Robert J. McGhee
- 1992–2004 Gail Surkan
- 2004–2013 Morris Flewwelling
- 2013–2021 Tara Veer
- 2021–2025 Ken Johnston
- 2025– Cindy Jefferies
