= R. E. Barrett =

Canadian politician (1904–1990)

Robert Edward Barrett (January 9, 1904 – October 3, 1990) was a Canadian politician. He served as the mayor of Red Deer, Alberta from 1965 to 1974 for a total of three terms.
