= Red Deer City Council =

Red Deer City Council is the governing body for the city of Red Deer, Alberta, Canada. The council consists of the mayor and eight councillors.

The current council was elected on October 20, 2025. The results of the election were certified October 22, 2025 and further updated on October 23, 2025.

== Red Deer City Mayor ==
- Cindy Jefferies

== Red Deer Councillors ==
- Kraymer Barnstable (Elected 2021, 2025)
- Tristin Brisbois (Elected 2025)
- Bruce Buruma (Elected 2021, 2025)
- Cassandra Curtis (Elected 2025)
- Adam Goodwin (Elected 2025)
- Chad Krahn (Elected 2024 [byelection], 2025)
- Jaelene Tweedle (Elected 2025)
- Dianne Wyntjes (Elected 2010, 2013, 2017, 2021, 2025)

== See also, ==
- List of mayors of Red Deer, Alberta
