= Blackfalds =

- Town
- Town of Blackfalds
- Location of Blackfalds in Alberta
- Coordinates: 52°22′33″N 113°47′35″W
- Country: Canada
- Province: Alberta
- Region: Central Alberta
- Census division: 8
- Municipal district: Lacombe County
- Incorporated
  - Village: June 17, 1904
  - Town: April 1, 1980

Government
  - Governing body: Blackfalds Town Council: Mayor Laura Svab, Ryan Brown, Cory Twerdoclib, Aaron Hoyte, Brenda Dennis, Jim Sands, Shane Hanson
  - MP: Blaine Calkins

Area (2021)
  - Land: 16.58 km^{2} (6.40 sq mi)
- Elevation: 880 m (2,890 ft)

Population (2021)
  - Total: 10,627
  - Municipal census (2021): 11,105
- Time zone: UTC−06:00 (Alberta Time)
- Forward sortation area: T0M 0J0
- Area codes: +1 403, +1 587
- Highway: Highway 2A
- Waterways: Blindman River; Red Deer River
- Website: Official website

Blackfalds is a town in central Alberta, Canada. It is located along Highway 2A 13.5 km north of Red Deer. The town's name, Waghorn (for Walter Waghorn, post master), changed in 1903 to Blackfalds, after Blackfalds, a Scottish hamlet.

== Demographics ==
Historical population
Year	Pop.	±%
1976	1,065	—
1981	1,468	+37.8%
1986	1,688	+15.0%
1991	1,769	+4.8%
1996	2,001	+13.1%
2001	3,042	+52.0%
2006	4,571	+50.3%
2011	6,300	+37.8%
2016	9,328	+48.1%
2021	10,627	+13.9%

In the 2021 Census of Population conducted by Statistics Canada, the Town of Blackfalds had a population of 10,627 living in 3,836 of its 4,010 total private dwellings, a change of 13.9% from its 2016 population of 9,328. With a land area of 16.58 km^{2} (6.40 sq mi), it had a population density of 641.0/km^{2} (1,660.1/sq mi) in 2021.

The population of the Town of Blackfalds according to its 2021 municipal census is 11,015, a change of 9.7% from its 2018 municipal census population of 10,125.

In the 2016 Census of Population conducted by Statistics Canada, the Town of Blackfalds recorded a population of 9,328 living in 3,302 of its 3,552 total private dwellings, a 48.1% change from its 2011 population of 6,300. With a land area of 16.44 km^{2} (6.35 sq mi), it had a population density of 567.4/km^{2} (1,469.6/sq mi) in 2016.

Panethnic groups in the Town of Blackfalds (2001−2021)
Panethnic group	2021		2016		2011		2006		2001	
Panethnic group	Pop.	%	Pop.	%	Pop.	%	Pop.	%	Pop.	%
European (Note: Statistic includes all persons that did not make up part of a visible minority or an indigenous identity.)	9,080	86.72%	8,155	87.45%	5,770	91.59%	4,315	94.42%	2,840	93.42%
Indigenous	690	6.59%	830	8.9%	465	7.38%	200	4.38%	125	4.11%
Southeast Asian (Note: Statistic includes total responses of "Filipino" and "Southeast Asian" under visible minority section on census.)	245	2.34%	115	1.23%	15	0.24%	15	0.33%	35	1.15%
East Asian (Note: Statistic includes total responses of "Chinese", "Korean", and "Japanese" under visible minority section on census.)	130	1.24%	110	1.18%	15	0.24%	40	0.88%	20	0.66%
Latin American	130	1.24%	35	0.38%	0	0%	0	0%	0	0%
African	100	0.96%	70	0.75%	0	0%	0	0%	25	0.82%
Middle Eastern (Note: Statistic includes total responses of "West Asian" and "Arab" under visible minority section on census.)	30	0.29%	0	0%	0	0%	0	0%	0	0%
South Asian	20	0.19%	25	0.27%	0	0%	0	0%	10	0.33%
Other/multiracial (Note: Statistic includes total responses of "Visible minority, n.i.e." and "Multiple visible minorities" under visible minority section on census.)	20	0.19%	10	0.11%	0	0%	0	0%	0	0%
Total responses	10,470	100%	9,325	99.97%	6,300	100%	4,570	99.98%	3,040	97.56%
Total population	10,470	100%	9,328	100%	6,300	100%	4,571	100%	3,116	100%
Note: Totals greater than 100% due to multiple origin responses

== Amenities ==
The town has many public facilities such as:

- Blackfalds Public Library, located in the Eagle Builders Centre on Waghorn Street.
- Blackfalds All Wheels Park and Blackfalds Bike Skills Park are located on Womacks Road off of Vista Trail.
- Tayles Water Spray Park, located next to the Cultural Centre.
- Blackfalds All-Star Park, located in the southwest corner of Blackfalds.
- Eagle Builders Centre, formerly Blackfalds Multiplex, home to the Blackfalds Bulldogs ice hockey team.
- Blackfalds Abbey Centre, a Multi-Purpose Fitness Facility and Outdoor Aquatic Centre.

== Education ==
The town has four public schools in the Wolf Creek school district and one catholic school in the Red Deer Catholic Regional Schools district:

- Iron Ridge Elementary Campus
- Iron Ridge Intermediate Campus
- Iron Ridge Junior Campus
- Iron Ridge Secondary Campus; and
- St. Gregory the Great Catholic School.
- St. Veronica Catholic School

== Media ==
The Town of Blackfalds is primarily served by regional weekly newspapers and one major daily. As of 2018, the town no longer has a newspaper of their own as the Blackfalds LIFE, which began circulation in August 2014, closed.

Blackfalds has access to rdnewsNOW, and receives the Red Deer Advocate and Lacombe Express.

Blackfalds is served by numerous radio stations from Red Deer and Lacombe, including Kraze 101.3 (CKIK), Real Country 95.5, Zed 99, Sunny 94, Big 105, X 100.7 (CKEX) and 106.7 Rewind Radio.

== Sports ==
The Blackfalds Bulldogs, formerly the Calgary Mustangs, of the AJHL relocated to Blackfalds in 2021. On February 1, 2024, the Bulldogs announced their move to the British Columbia Hockey League.

== See also ==
- List of communities in Alberta
- List of towns in Alberta
