= Jim Sheasgreen =

Canadian politician

29th Mayor of Fort Saskatchewan
- In office October 26, 2004 – October 18, 2010
- Preceded by: Ken Hodgins
- Succeeded by: Gale Katchur

Personal details
- Born: Montreal, Quebec, Canada
- Spouse: Christine Sheasgreen

Jim Sheasgreen is a Canadian politician and the former mayor of Fort Saskatchewan, Alberta.

== Biography ==
Sheasgreen was born and raised in Montreal, Quebec.

Sheasgreen holds a Bachelor of Arts, a Bachelor of Education, and a master's degree in educational administration. He was the superintendent of schools in Falher, Alberta, and Fort Saskatchewan from 1985 to 1998. He was the deputy superintendent for Elk Island Catholic Schools from 1998 to 2003.

Sheasgreen was first elected to political office in 2001 as a Fort Saskatchewan city councillor.

In 2004, he defeated incumbent mayor Ken Hodgins by earning 63.4% of the popular vote in the two-candidate mayoral race. He had no challengers in the 2007 municipal election and was acclaimed.

In 2010, Sheasgreen was defeated by Gale Katchur. One-term councillor Katchur earned 54.8% of the vote in the two-candidate mayoral race.

Sheasgreen is married to Christine Sheasgreen. They have three children.
