= CKFT-FM =

Radio station in Fort Saskatchewan, Alberta

- Fort Saskatchewan, Alberta; Canada
- Broadcast area: The Heartland
- Frequency: 107.9 MHz
- Branding: Mix 107.9

Programming
- Format: Adult contemporary

Ownership
- Owner: Kenner Media

History
- First air date: November 27, 2012
- Call sign meaning: FT for "Fort"

Technical information
- Class: B1
- ERP: 11,000 watts average 20,000 watts peak
- HAAT: 60.5 metres (198 ft)
- Transmitter coordinates: 53°43′0.9″N 113°15′26.8″W

Links
- Webcast: Listen Live
- Website: heartlandnews.ca

CKFT-FM (107.9 MHz, "Mix 107.9") is a radio station licensed to Fort Saskatchewan, Alberta. Owned by Kenner Media, it broadcasts a hot adult contemporary format targeting Fort Saskatchewan, Strathcona County, Sturgeon County and Edmonton.

== History ==
Golden West Broadcasting received CRTC approval for a new licence to serve Fort Saskatchewan on January 10, 2012. Signal tests on 107.9 FM began on October 23, 2012. The station launched at 10:00a.m. on November 27 of that year with a hot adult contemporary format branded at "Mix 107."

On May 23, 2023, Kenner Media received CRTC approval to acquire CKFT-FM from Golden West Broadcasting.

Previous logo

On October 31, 2023, at 3 p.m., after stunting with a loop of a Vincent Price line from the Michael Jackson song "Thriller", the station launched its first tenure of all-Christmas music for the holiday season, and introduced former CKRA-FM personality Rob Christie as its new morning host.
