= Gale Katchur =

Canadian politician

Her Worship Gale Katchur

30th Mayor of Fort Saskatchewan
- In office October 18, 2010 – October 29, 2025
- Preceded by: Jim Sheasgreen
- Succeeded by: Lisa Makin

Personal details
- Born: Fort St. John, British Columbia
- Spouse: Wayne Katchur

Gale Katchur is a Canadian politician and former mayor of Fort Saskatchewan, Alberta.

== Biography ==
Katchur was born Gale Lewchuk in Fort St. John, British Columbia, but raised on a farm near Spirit River, Alberta.

Katchur served as a civil servant in the Alberta government before moving to private industry with Baker International. A few years after the birth of her second child in 1983, Katchur was hired as a civil servant for the City of Fort Saskatchewan where she worked for 17 years.

Katchur was first elected to political office in 2007 as a Fort Saskatchewan city councillor, officially resigning her job within the city government upon her election.

In 2010, she defeated incumbent mayor Jim Sheasgreen by earning 54.8% of the popular vote in the two-candidate mayoral race. She was reelected in 2013, 2017 and 2021.

Katchur is the second female mayor in the history of Fort Saskatchewan. Muriel Abdurahman was the first.

== Personal life ==
Katchur is married to husband Wayne, a retired banker. They have two children: Ryan and Erin. Both are married and have children. Ryan has two kids named Rune and Kaia, and Erin has two kids named Logan and Arianna.

== Controversy ==
During the City of Fort Saskatchewan's Committee of the Whole meeting on September 17, 2024, Katchur stated "It would be cruel to say, but it would be interesting if people could deal with them themselves … like in the old days when you lived on a farm." Mayor Katchur then admonished that, "when you lived on the farm, if there was cats, you threw them in a bag and threw them in a river, or they just put them on the exhaust pipe."

Katchur's position on the killing of feral cats led to widespread push back and calls for her resignation. Diana Graham, co-founder of the stray cat rescue agency Community Cats Edmonton was among to call for Katchur's resignation, stating "We’re disappointed to see that Mayor Katchur still thinks harming stray and feral cats is something to joke about. Stray and feral cats are one of the most vulnerable animal populations out there. They exist because of human negligence, and they’re just trying to survive. Comments like Gale’s put them even more at risk."

On September 19, 2024 Mayor Katchur publicly apologized for her comments, stating "I understand that my remarks did not align with the values of compassion and inclusivity that we strive to uphold. Our community deserves leadership that reflects these principles, and I am committed to learning from this experience.[...] Moving forward, I will ensure that my comments and our approach to managing animal populations reflect our community’s dedication to humane and responsible practices."
