= Fort Saskatchewan station =

Railway station in Alberta, Canada

Fort Saskatchewan
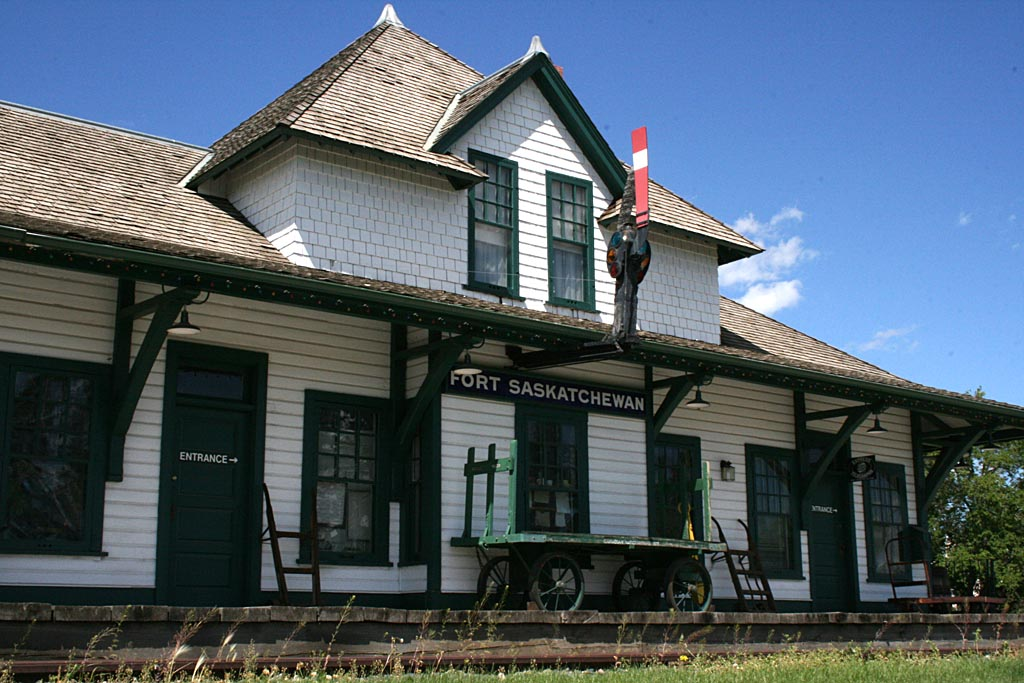

General information
- Location: 10030 99 Avenue; Fort Saskatchewan, Alberta
- Coordinates: 53.7099°N 113.2145°W
- Line: Canadian National Railway

History
- Opened: 1905
- Closed: 1988

Former services
Preceding station	Canadian National Railway	Following station
River Bend toward Edmonton	Edmonton – Winnipeg via North Battleford and Regina	Scotford toward Winnipeg
Location

The Fort Saskatchewan Canadian Northern Railway Station is a former railway station in Fort Saskatchewan, Alberta, Canada. It is a designated provincial historic resource. It was built by the Canadian Northern Railway along the east-west Canadian Northern Railway line. The 1 1/2-storey, wood-frame building is of a modified third-class station design (100-19 plan) employed at some of the major stops along the line; it is longer than that of most third-class designs. This included a vestibule, kitchen, living room, large general waiting room, separate ladies' waiting room, office and a small freight shed and was augmented with an expansion in 1911, In 1986 an agreement was reached by Canadian National and the town to remove the tracks into town and on September 8, 1987, the last train passed by the station. In 1991, the Fort Saskatchewan Kinsmen Club and Fort Saskatchewan Historical Society restored the station building. It is now part of the Fort Heritage Precinct, the City of Fort Saskatchewan's museum and historic site, and includes a railway museum in the station agent's office, ladies waiting room, and upstairs living quarters. Rooms can be rented to community groups and as of 2020, Miller's Ice Cream shop occupies the north end of the station.

The Canadian Northern Railway reached Fort Saskatchewan in 1905, placing the town on a transcontinental rail line. The first bridge across the river was also built at this time, with the railway paying for it in exchange for free land for its station in Fort Saskatchewan. Prior to the bridge, the only method to cross the river at Fort Saskatchewan was via ferry.
