= Dow Centennial Centre =

Canadian multipurpose recreation facility

Coordinates: 53.6835°N 113.2354°W

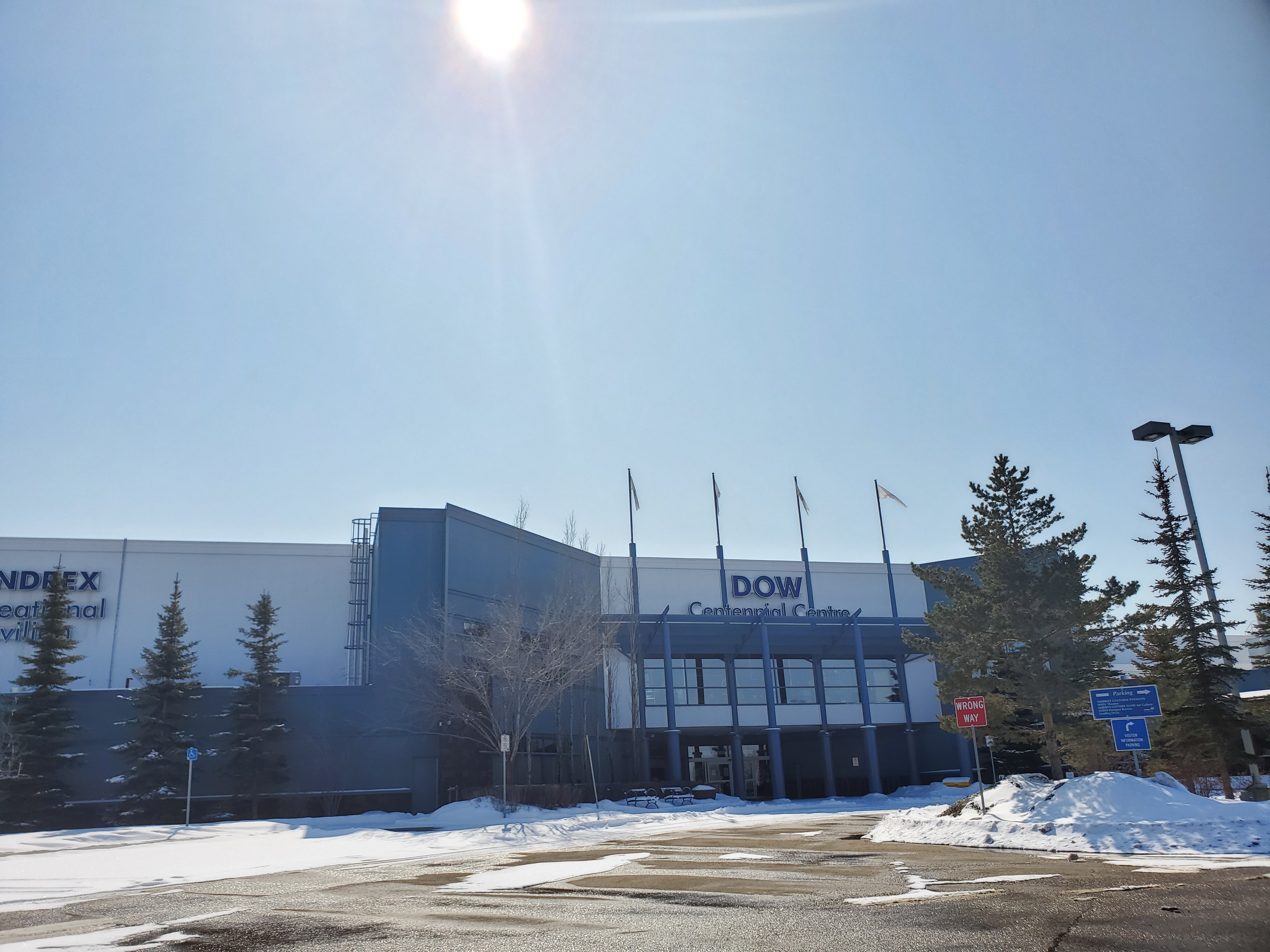
Dow Centennial Centre, main entrance, April 2020

The Dow Centennial Centre (DCC) is a multipurpose recreational facility in Fort Saskatchewan, Alberta, Canada. Constructed in 2003–2004 for the city's centennial, the 13,400-square-metre (144,000 sq ft) complex cost $22 million.

The DCC is notable for its arts facilities, which include a 550-seat performing arts theatre, and for its energy efficiency. However, it lacks any swimming facilities. The DCC has frequently hosted the province's judo and ringette championships.

== Background and design ==
Into the early 2000s, there was a lack of public spaces in Fort Saskatchewan, Alberta. The public gym and art studios were located in decrepit buildings which had once belonged to the local jail and were scheduled for demolition. There were no performance spaces, and some residents were travelling outside the city to find facilities. These factors put pressure on the city to create a new recreational facility.

An initial proposal for a new community centre was rejected by city taxpayers in 2001. A larger plan, called the Centennial Activities Centre, (Note: The Centre was initially planned to open in July 2004, for the centennial of Fort Saskatchewan's incorporation as a town.) attempted to meet all the community's requests with a gymnasium, indoor soccer pitch and hockey rink, studios for pottery and painting, a performing arts theatre, and a banquet facility. The 13,400-square-metre (144,000 sq ft) complex was approved by taxpayers in 2002.

The Centre was designed by architect Ken Hutchinson, and is distinguished from other multipurpose recreational facilities by its performing arts theatre and energy efficiency. Hutchinson made certain not to disguise the facility's features, with the second-floor running track and other prominent aspects visible from the reception area. The city's 4400 school children designed ceramic tiles which decorate several of the Centre's walls.

== Financing ==
The projected cost of the Centre was $20 million. City taxpayers voted to pay $15 million of this over 20 years; the remainder was sought through grants and donations. The city had secured commitments for about half of these monies by July 2003.

The provincial government provided $2 million in grants. The largest corporate donor, Dow Chemical Company, donated $1 million towards the Centre, partially in the form of insulation materials manufactured by the company, and received naming rights as the Dow Centennial Centre (DCC). Other corporate donors include Sherritt International, Shell Canada and Agrium (now Nutrien), which respectively received naming rights to the hockey arena, performing arts theatre and indoor soccer pitch. Private donors include professional hockey players Richard Matvichuk and Ray Whitney.

Cost increases during construction were paid through additional fundraising, through lease charges, and through the city's budget reserves. The total cost of construction was just under $22 million.

Opened to the public on 15 September 2004, the DCC operated at a loss and cost the city millions of dollars over its first three years of operations, although it is credited with spurring nearby commercial and residential development in the city. In 2007, Telus was granted a five-year lease to a small parcel of land on the DCC property, to erect a 45-metre (148 ft) telecommunications tower, the tallest in the city.

== Construction ==
Groundwork for the DCC began in spring 2003 on an 11-hectare (27-acre) lot on Alberta Highway 21 at 84th Street. The primary builder was Stuart Olson Construction, with the work overseen by project manager Dick Polowaniuk and city manager Paul Benedetto.

The foundations were poured in July 2003. By October 2003, it was realized that second-floor expansions planned for a future date could be completed more cost-effectively alongside the main build. These were approved by city council, along with additional commercial space to generate lease revenues.

The Centre was intended to open in July 2004, for the centennial of Fort Saskatchewan's incorporation as a town. This was pushed back to September 2004.

== Features ==
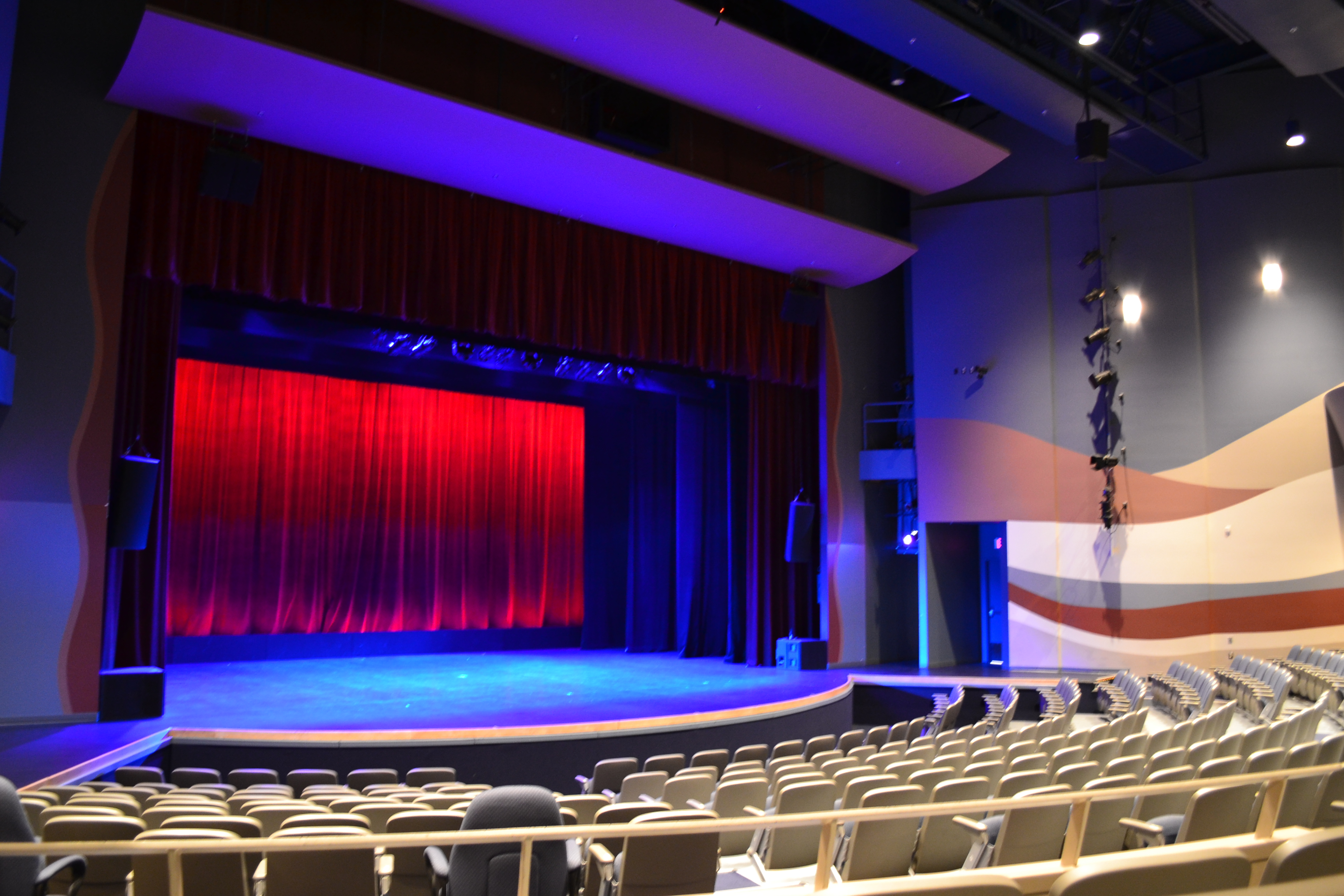
DCC performing arts theatre

The multi-purpose recreational facility has many features:

- Sports and fitness:
  - Ice hockey rink – NHL size, 61 by 24 metres (200 by 80 ft)
  - Indoor soccer pitch (can be reconfigured for other uses)
  - Recreational skating area
  - Saunas and steam room
  - Fitness facility
  - 334-metre (1,096 ft) indoor running track
  - Children's play area with rubber flooring
  - Gymnasium which can be divided for separate activities
- Culture:
  - 552-seat performing arts theatre
  - Pottery studio with 18 pottery wheels and 3 kilns
  - Painting and quilting studio
  - Art gallery
- Reception areas:
  - 430-seat banquet hall

As of 2004, commercial space included physiotherapy and massage clinics, Ticketmaster, a sandwich shop and a refreshment booth. There is also a 660-square-metre (7,100 sq ft) commercial kitchen, capable of serving 2000 people at 4 events per evening.

Most of the facility has extra-thick insulation, and the sinks, toilets and urinals are designed to save water. An "eco-chill" system pumps glycol from the hockey rink's refrigerant compressors to the air vents in the soccer pitch, theatre and fitness centre, warming them in the winter and cooling them in the summer (when the hockey rink isn't in use). High-efficiency boilers provide backup heating, and solar panels on the facility's roof generate approximately 6,000 kilowatt-hours of energy per year.

The DCC is operated by a staff of 35. (Note: Not including employees in the commercial space.)

== Expansion plans ==
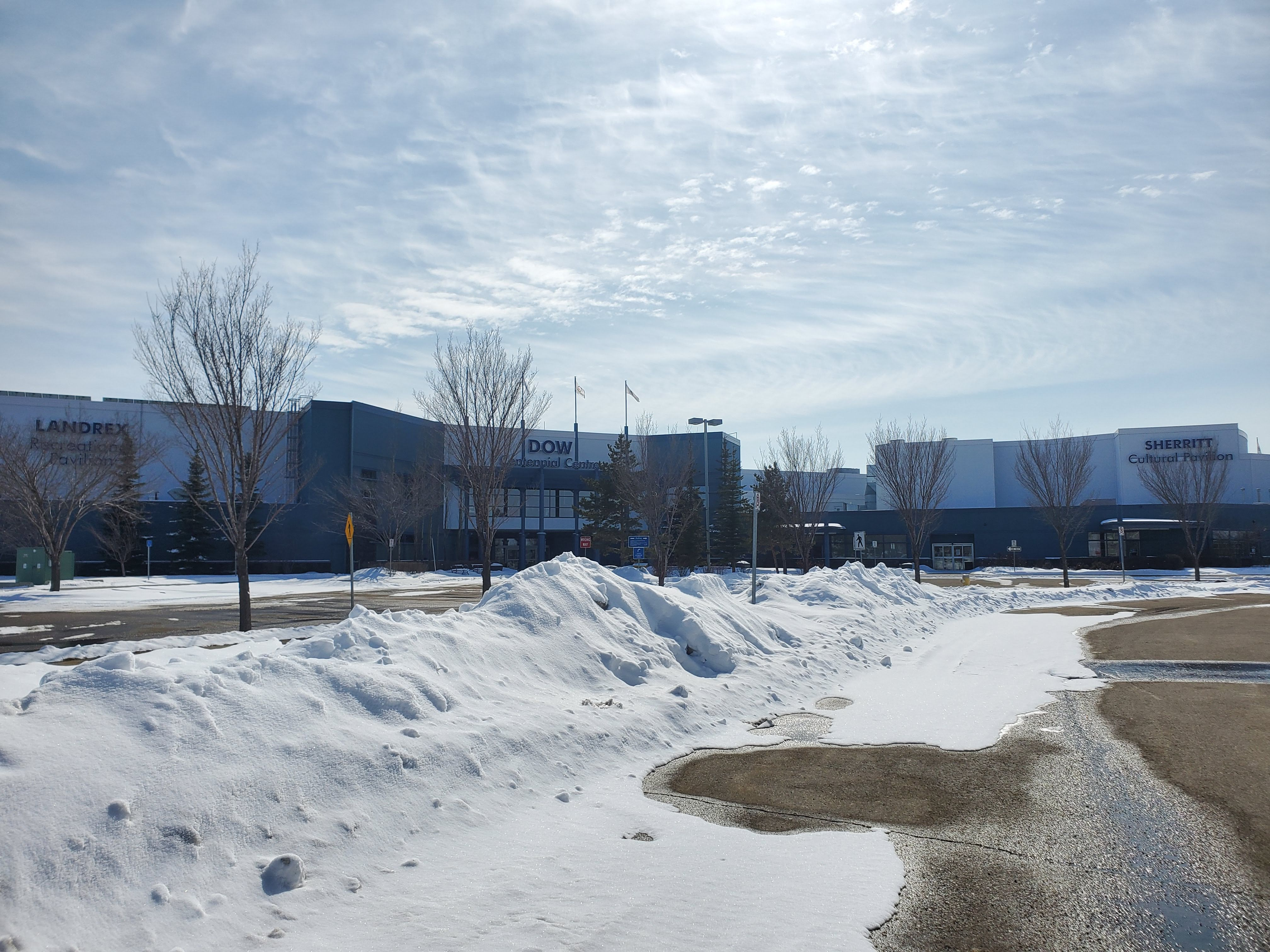
DCC in April 2020

Citing rapid population growth, the city's 2015 recreation master plan called for a $27 million aquatic centre and fitness expansion at the DCC planned for 2017–2020, followed in 2020–2022 by a second hockey arena at a cost of $12 million. Under Hockey Canada's development model, the city was not providing adequate practice time for the city's teams, who were seeking ice time in other communities.

== Notable events ==
The DCC's performing arts theatre has hosted notable performers including Randy Bachman, George Canyon, Matt Good, Natalie MacMaster, Rita MacNeil, John McDermott, and Trooper. The theatre was also used for the opening concert scene in the 2008 Skyline Motion Pictures film Cat's Cradle.

The facility has hosted a number of tournaments, frequently hosting the provincial judo and ringette championships.

- 2005 Junior/Juvenile National Judo Championships, 2–3 July 2005.
- 2007 Alberta Senior Games, 26–29 July 2007
- 2007 Diamond Ring ringette tournament, 2–4 November 2007
- 2008 Hockey Alberta Atom AA Championship, 7–9 March 2008, held jointly with the city's Jubilee Recreation Centre (JRC) and Sportsplex arena.
- 2009 Fragapalooza – National gaming convention, 6–9 August 2009
- 2011 Judo Alberta Provincial Championships, 12 March 2011
- 2011 Diamond Ring ringette tournament, 2–4 December 2011, held jointly with JRC and Sportsplex.
- 2013 Alberta U-12A and U-19B ringette tournaments, 15–17 March, held jointly with JRC.
- 2014 Judo Alberta Provincial Championships, 1 February 2014
- 2016 Judo Alberta Provincial Championships, 27 Jan 2016
- 2017 Judo Alberta Provincial Championships, 28 Jan 2017
- 2019 Diamond Ring ringette tournament, 29 Nov – 1 Dec 2019, held jointly with JRC
