= List of mayors of Fort Saskatchewan =

Fort Saskatchewan was incorporated as a village in 1899, a town in 1904, and a city in 1985. It elects its mayors separately from its Councillors. Since its incorporation as a town in 1904, 30 residents have served as Mayor.

Mayors of Fort Saskatchewan
Mayor	Term Began	Term Ended
William Ford Langworthy	1904	1906
H.G. McAvoy	1907	1907
H.E. Daniel	1907	1908
Dr. Peter Aylen	1909	1911
A.M. Sutherland	1912	1912
S.O. Jones	1913	1914
James Graham	1915	1916
John W. Kidney	1917	1920
Ray E. Staples	1921	1922
Arnold Carscadden	1923	1924
A.M. Sutherland	1925	1926
Robert Hunter	1927	1928
William H. (Nobby) White	1929	1930
G.T. Montgomery	1931	1934
A.H. Rogers	1935	1936
W.A. (Bill) Graham	1937	1940
Peter A. Moret	1941	1942
C.R.W. (Dick) Mager	1943	1949
Charles Lowe	March 1950	March 1954
David Mackie	March 1954	March 1956
Charles Lowe	March 1956	April 1960
Carl Hennig	May 1960	October 1960
Cliff Curry	October 1960	October 1964
B. Knowles	October 1964	August 1970
Walter Sherman	August 1970	October 1970
John Lupul	October 1970	October 1971
Henry Powell	October 1971	October 1980
Muriel Abdurahman	October 1980	April 1986
Pryce Alderson	April 1986	October 1995
Ken Hodgins	October 1995	October 2004
Jim Sheasgreen	October 26, 2004	October 18, 2010
Gale Katchur	October 19, 2010	October 29, 2025
Lisa Makin	October 29, 2025	present
