= Fort Saskatchewan =

- City
- City of Fort Saskatchewan
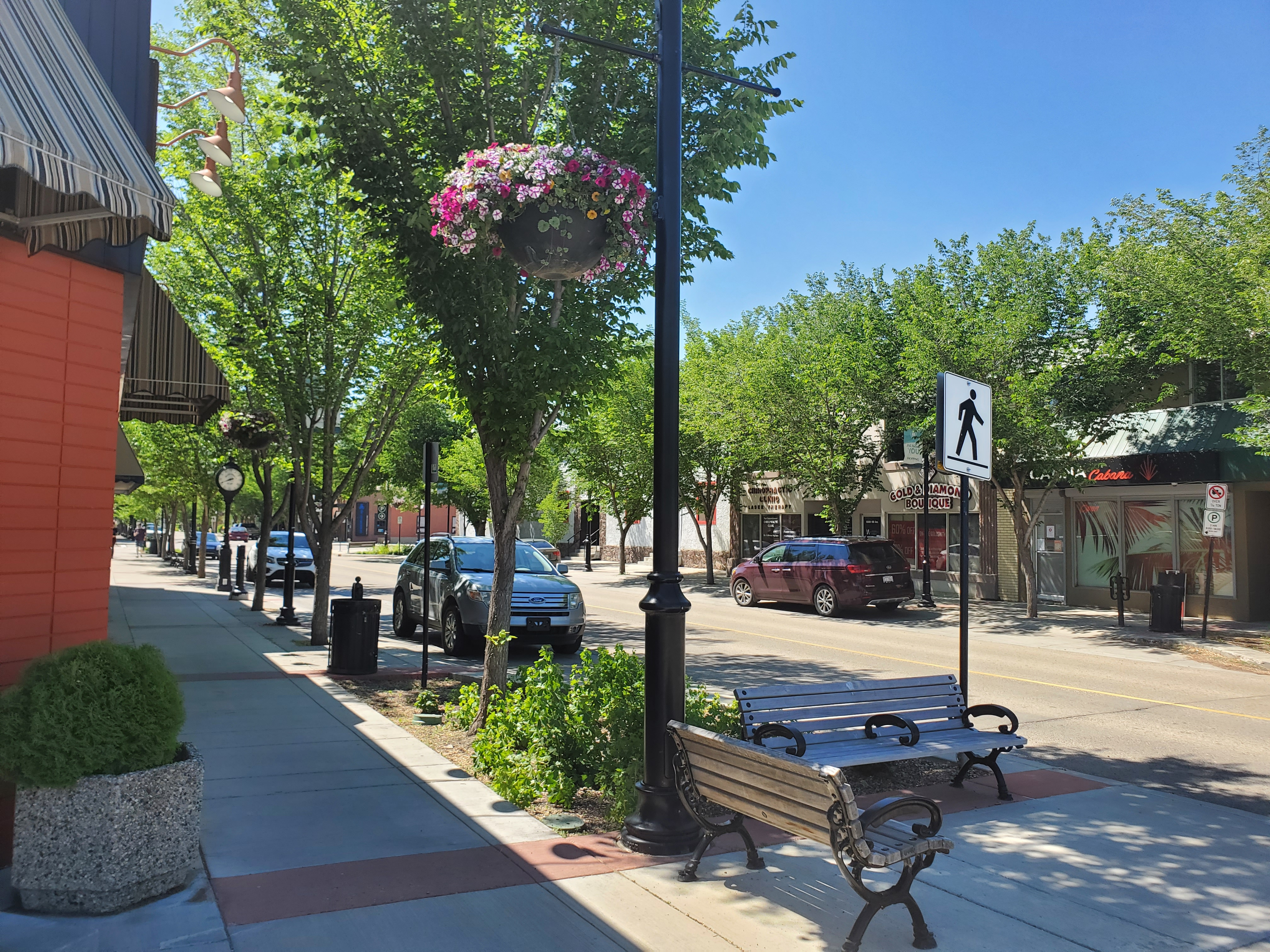
- Downtown Fort Saskatchewan

- Flag Seal Logo
- Motto: Gotta love it!
- Location of Fort Saskatchewan with Strathcona County Location of Fort Saskatchewan in Alberta
- Coordinates: 53°42′46″N 113°12′48″W
- Country: Canada
- Province: Alberta
- Region: Edmonton Metropolitan Region
- Planning region: North Saskatchewan
- Incorporated
  - Village: March 1, 1899
  - Town: July 1, 1904
  - City: July 1, 1967
- Named for: North Saskatchewan River

Government
  - Mayor: Lisa Makin (Past mayors)
  - Governing body: Fort Saskatchewan City Council: Birgit Blizzard; Gordon Harris; Allan Wesley; Gale Katchur; Patrick Noyen; Arjun Randhawa
  - Manager: Troy Fleming
  - MP: Garnett Genuis (Sherwood Park—Fort Saskatchewan-Conservative)
  - MLA: Jackie Armstrong Homeniuk (Fort Saskatchewan-Vegreville-UCP)

Area (2021)
  - Land: 56.5 km^{2} (21.8 sq mi)
- Elevation: 610 m (2,000 ft)

Population (2021)
  - Total: 27,464
  - Density: 479.4/km^{2} (1,242/sq mi)
  - Municipal census (2023): 28,624
- Time zone: UTC−06:00 (Alberta Time)
- Forward sortation area: T8L
- Area codes: 780, 587, 825, 368
- Highways: Highway 15, Highway 21
- Waterways: North Saskatchewan River; Pointe-aux-Pins Creek; Ross Creek
- Public Transit Service: Fort Sask Transit
- Website: fortsask.ca

Fort Saskatchewan is a city along the North Saskatchewan River in Alberta, Canada. It is 25 kilometres (16 mi) northeast of Edmonton, the provincial capital. It is part of the Edmonton census metropolitan area and one of 24 municipalities that constitute the Edmonton Metropolitan Region Board. Its population in the 2021 federal census was 27,464.

The city was founded as a North-West Mounted Police fort and later home to a large provincial jail. The original fort was located across the river from the hamlet of Lamoureux, and Fort Saskatchewan opened a replica of the fort next to its original site in 2011. Fort Saskatchewan is bordered by Strathcona County to the south and east, Sturgeon County to the north and west, and the City of Edmonton to the southwest. Sturgeon County is across the North Saskatchewan River.

The city is best known for its proximity to chemical plants, including Dow Chemical, Sherritt International, Nutrien (formerly Agrium), Linde (Praxair), and Shell Canada. It is also known for its flock of 50 sheep that roam the Fort Heritage Precinct throughout the summer months eating the grass.

== History ==
=== Pre-colonization and founding ===
Prior to colonization of the region, the area around what is now Fort Saskatchewan was a gathering place and home for many Indigenous nations, including the Cree and Métis. Indigenous peoples of the region commonly travelled the North Saskatchewan River by canoe. The mouth of the Sturgeon River, located near modern-day Fort Saskatchewan's industrial business park, was an ideal location to gather the materials necessary to construct canoes. The Cree name of the area of modern-day Fort Saskatchewan is waskwayâhtik ispatinaw (Birch Hills) because birch bark was an important component for making canoes and scrolls with Cree syllabics inscribed on them.

Inspector William D. Jarvis, who led a column of North-West Mounted Police (NWMP) during the March West, established Sturgeon Creek Post in 1875. The post was soon renamed "Fort (on the) Saskatchewan", and it became a key northern police garrison. Its location caused outrage among residents of Edmonton, who held a meeting voicing their concern that the police garrison was located far from their settlement. Chief Factor Richard Hardisty, in charge of Fort Edmonton, wanted the police garrison to be located across the river and slightly upstream from his fort. However, Inspector Jarvis preferred the downstream site because he believed that its narrower and shallower river banks were better suited for a future railway crossing.

The NWMP made Fort Saskatchewan the headquarters of 'G' Division in 1885, and considered moving it to Edmonton to accommodate an expansion. The residents of Edmonton were enthusiastic about this proposal; they held a meeting to voice their support for the move, and submitted a 250-signature petition to the Minister of the Interior. However, the existing (temporary) NWMP barracks in Edmonton were so dilapidated that some officers mutinied in 1886 – an event known among police at the time as "the Big Buck". It was cheaper to expand Fort Saskatchewan at its current location than to rebuild and expand the garrison in Edmonton. Despite the efforts of Edmonton's residents, who would continue to protest and voice their discontent until 1888, Fort Saskatchewan remained where it was.

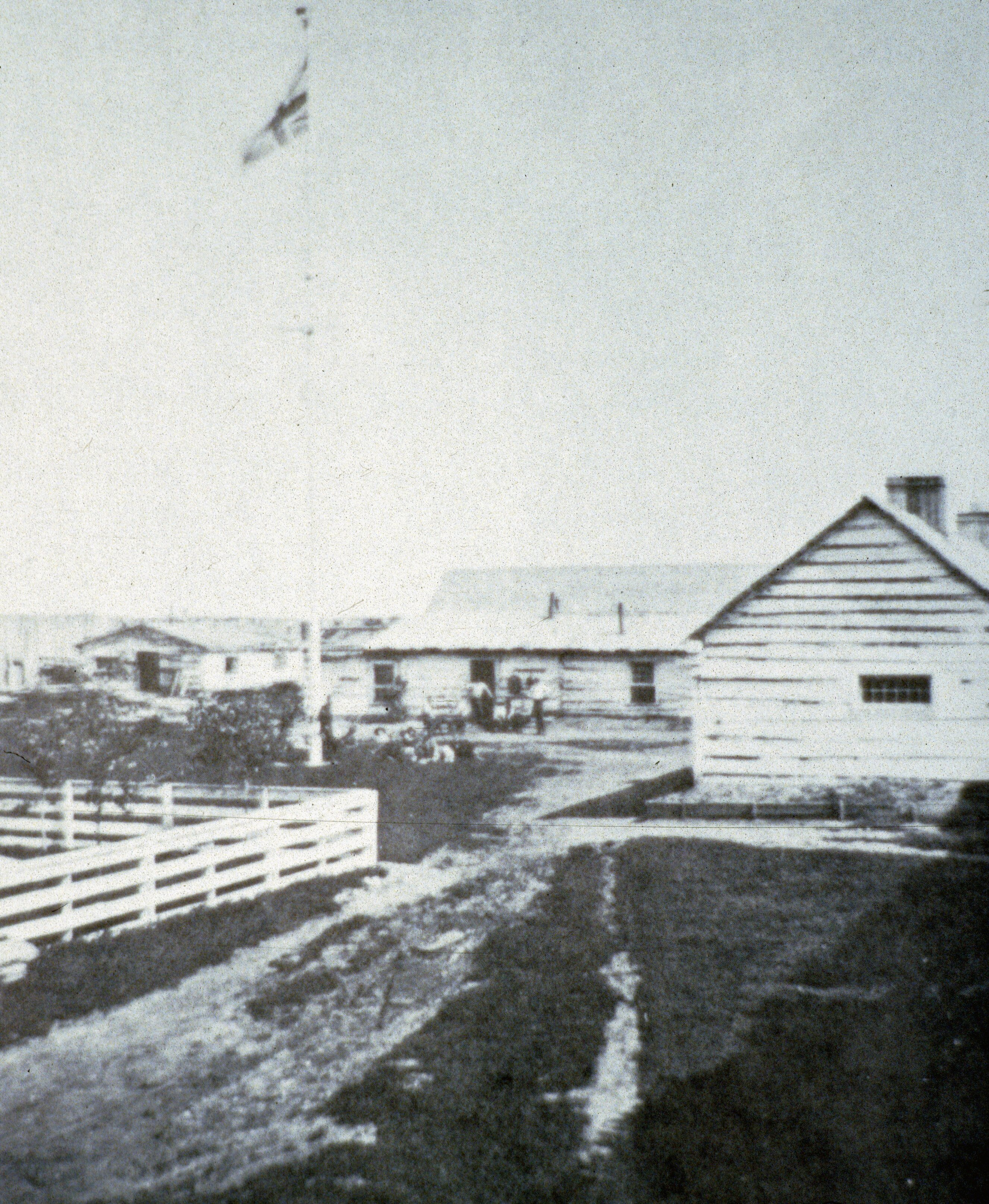
The interior of Fort Saskatchewan, c. 1884

The palisade wall surrounding the fort was dismantled in 1886, and the fort was expanded for a second time in 1889. As headquarters of 'G' Division, it hosted patrols that extended as far as Fort Simpson and Chesterfield Inlet. The NWMP transferred the property to the Alberta government in 1911 for the construction of a provincial jail, and the fort was soon demolished. Artifacts and structural features have been discovered during subsequent digs, including clothing buttons, a possible privy deposit, and structural remains of the original palisade wall. The site of the fort has been partially damaged by the installation of underground utilities, and the construction of the provincial jail. Fort Saskatchewan was incorporated as a village in 1899, a town in 1904, and a city in 1985.

==== Hanging of Swift Runner ====
Five hangings were conducted at the fort between 1879 and 1914. On December 20, 1879, Fort Saskatchewan's police garrison conducted the first hanging in the North-West Territories (which included present-day Alberta).

Swift Runner (Ka-Ki-Si-Kutchin), a Cree man, was considered by locals to be smart and trustworthy, and he had previously served as a guide for local police. He was expelled from Fort Saskatchewan, and later his tribe as well, after developing a severe addiction to whisky. After he eventually arrived back at Fort Saskatchewan alone, it was discovered that he killed and ate his six children, his wife, his brother, and his mother. Possible motives for his acts have been proposed, such as trauma from previously being forced to eat a deceased hunting partner out of necessity, or being possessed by Wendigo – a flesh eating spirit in some Indigenous cultures.

Charged for murder and cannibalism, Swift Runner was sentenced to death in August 1879 by a jury consisting of three Métis residents, four locals who knew the Cree language, and a Cree translator. Scaffolding was built for his hanging in December, and an army pensioner was paid $50 to act as the hangman. Local Indigenous Chiefs were also invited to observe the execution to pacify rumours of unnecessary cruelty inflicted upon the condemned. The hanging was delayed after locals used the trap from the scaffolding as fire kindling, and the hangman forgot straps to bind Swift Runner's arms. At 9:30 am, Swift Runner was hanged in front of 60 onlookers and pronounced dead shortly after. Within an hour, his body was cut from the rope and buried in the snow outside the fort walls.

=== Early growth ===
==== Arrival of the railway ====
Prior to the arrival of the railway, travellers to and from Edmonton had to traverse a dirt trail that wound around woods and swamps.

The Canadian Northern Railway (CNR) reached Fort Saskatchewan in 1905, placing the town on what would eventually become a transcontinental rail line. The CNR station is a modified third-class station design (100-19 plan); a "special station" that was used by CNR at the most significant stops along their line. It has several unique features, such as a longer footprint than other third-class stations, and a freight shed; these reflected Fort Saskatchewan's status as the centre of an agricultural district and the largest community on the CNR line between Edmonton and North Battleford, Saskatchewan. A second freight shed was built on the west side of the station in 1911; a sign of the growth in population and rail traffic that Fort Saskatchewan experienced. The station is the only surviving model 100-19 railway station in Alberta. In the decade after the railway arrived, the town's population nearly doubled to 993.

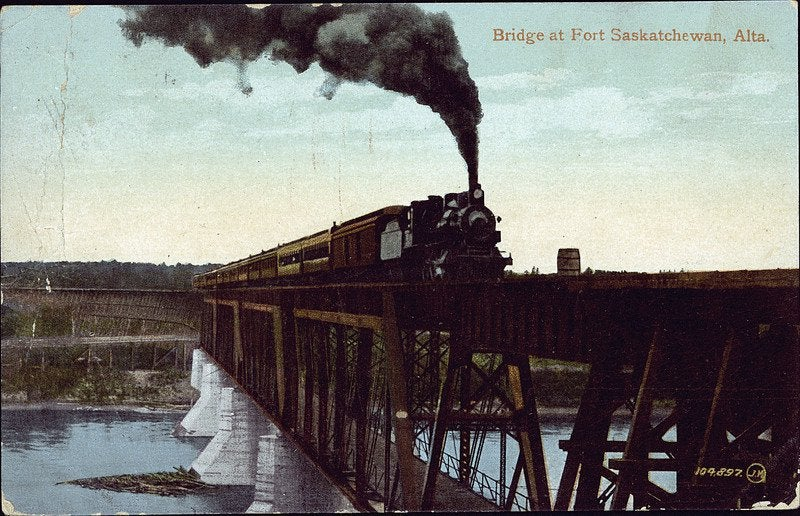
A colour postcard showing a train crossing the CNR bridge into Fort Saskatchewan. The wooden car deck can be seen below.

The first bridge leading to Fort Saskatchewan, crossing the North Saskatchewan River, was also built at this time; CNR paid for it in exchange for free land for its station. It had a railway deck on its upper level and a wooden road deck on its lower level. Previously, the only method to cross the river at Fort Saskatchewan was via ferry. At the time of the bridge's construction, the Edmonton Bulletin described it as the second largest bridge in the CNR. The road deck was too narrow to allow more than one-way traffic, and traffic lights were later installed on each side of the bridge to help prevent collisions. Some drivers ignored the traffic lights at night, and proceeded if they did not see any oncoming headlights; even if they had a red light. A heavy vehicle struck the bridge in 1950, and a girder was forced 18 inches (46 cm) out of alignment by the impact. The safety concerns illustrated by these two factors caused the province to open a new two-lane bridge downstream of the railway bridge. After it opened in 1957, the railway bridge's lower traffic deck was dismantled.

The railway station and line through Fort Saskatchewan were in use until the late 1980s. Declining rail traffic and safety concerns regarding the transportation of dangerous goods prompted the Canadian National Railway to divert the line away from the city's non-industrial areas. The station and its property, including the railway track directly in front of it, were sold to the Province of Alberta, which immediately re-sold it to Fort Saskatchewan. The 1905 bridge was demolished soon after the railway was diverted. The old piers still stand in the river as of 2022.

As of 1987, all freight and passenger rail connections occur in Edmonton, and a new bridge, downstream and northeast of Fort Saskatchewan's downtown, carries a rail line that goes through Fort Saskatchewan's industrial area without going through residential areas.

==== Combined fire and town hall ====
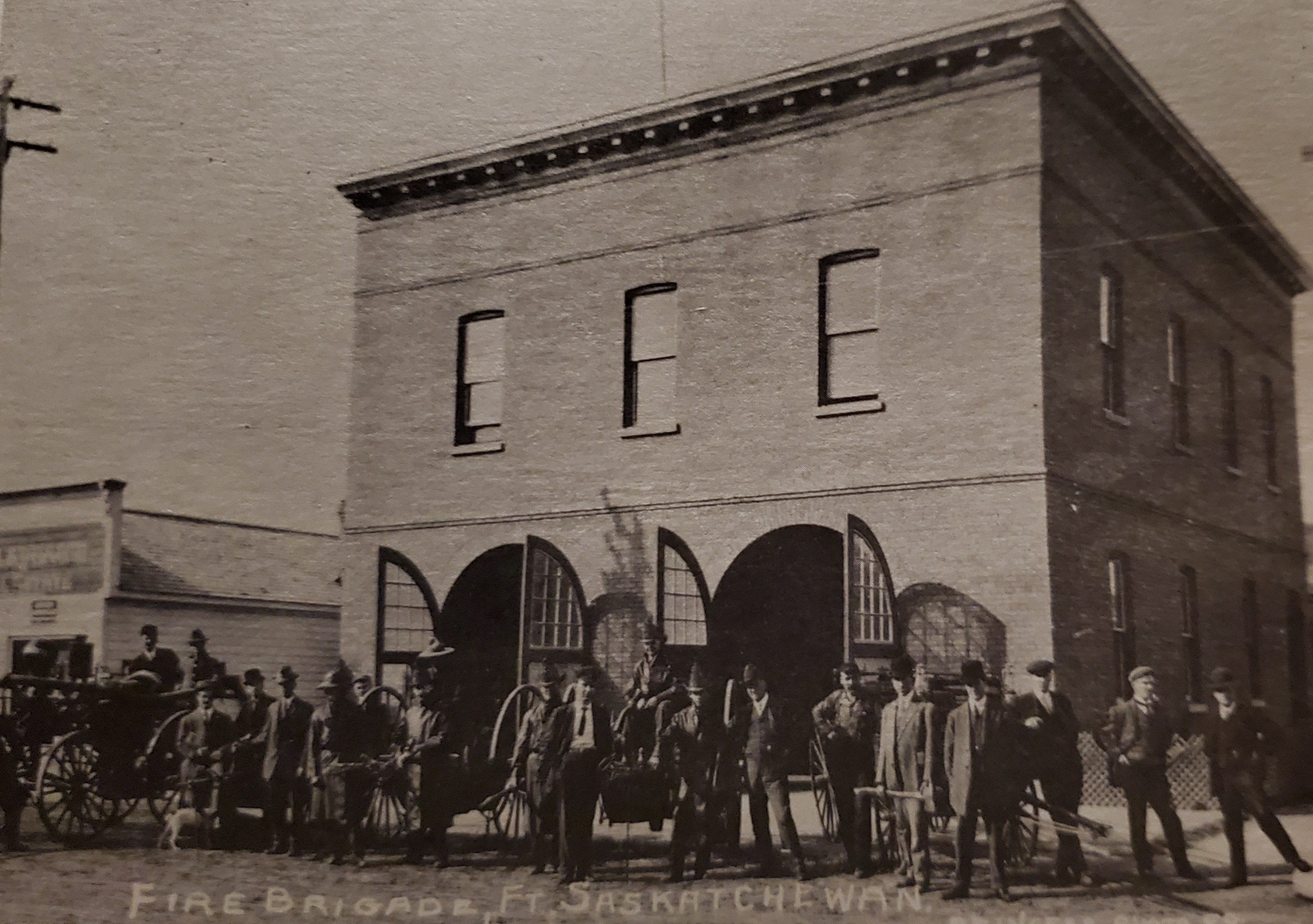
The Fort Saskatchewan Fire Department gathered outside of the combined fire/town hall in 1910.

Town council, meeting in the Odd Fellows Hall, approved the construction of a combined fire and town hall in 1905. The building would also contain two cells for police use. Council originally voted to purchase land for the building behind the Queen's Hotel for $675, but a public petition successfully persuaded council to instead purchase land on the north-west corner of 100 Avenue and 103 Street for $1,250. Local taxpayers voted for $6000 to be spent on the construction of the building, and $7000 on fire-fighting equipment.

The fire and town hall was completed in 1906; the fire department occupied the bottom level, and the town hall and council chamber were located on the upper floor. The fire department occupied the bottom floor until 1958, while the town hall was located in the building until 1970. The building is now privately owned and used as commercial space.

==== Hydroelectric dam ====
After purchasing the Fort Electric Company in 1910, Town Council voted to purchase land near the mouth of the Sturgeon River, and construct a $30,000 wooden hydroelectric dam and power plant which were expected to last approximately 20 years. The town had to take over construction of the dam and plant in 1911 after the contracted firm went bankrupt. There were two separate instances in June 1911 where water rose above the dam and flooded the construction area. By its completion in December 1911, Fort Saskatchewan had spent $80,000 on the project. Minor leaks were detected throughout the next few months, and the plant was shut down in April 1912 after a washout at the penstock damaged the canal, a bulkhead, and parts of the natural riverbank. This incident was blamed on faulty construction.

The town decided in September 1912 that there was no cost-effective way to repair the dam. It instead retrofitted its old power house for $3000, and absorbed the financial losses associated with prematurely decommissioning the dam. The power plant on the grounds of the jail supplied the entire town for eight years, during-which Fort Saskatchewan faced numerous issues with residents neglecting to pay their power bills. The town finalized an agreement for Calgary Power to purchase the town's equipment for $26,000 in June 1928, and supply the town with power for ten years.

==== Public emergencies ====
===== Downtown fire =====
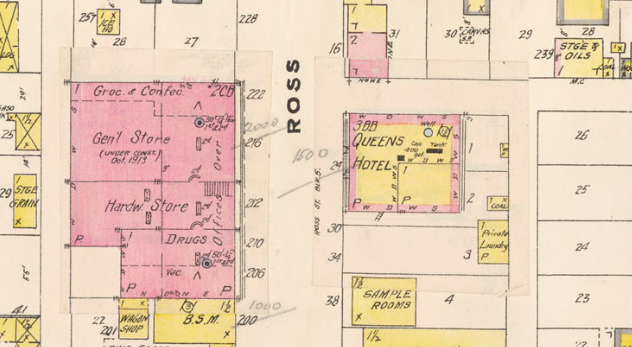
A fire insurance map for Fort Saskatchewan published in 1912, but revised in 1913 after the downtown fire. The darker patches indicate the extent of the damage caused by the fire, because the revisions were pasted on top of the original map.

A fire swept through a large portion of the town's business section on January 21, 1913. It is thought to have started in the Queen's hotel, before quickly leaping across the street to nearby buildings. The fire department struggled to start their engine, and their hose froze; by the time they fixed their equipment, the fire was too large to be contained. Five businesses, primarily located in the Fetherstonhaugh Block, were lost to the fire — costing a total of $24,000 in damages. In the spring of 1913, construction began on $69,500 worth of buildings in the business section. These new buildings included the Williamson Block, which replaced the Fetherstonhaugh Block, and a new Queen's Hotel.

===== Influenza epidemic of 1918–1919 =====
In response to the worsening Spanish Influenza outbreak, the local Board of Health placed Fort Saskatchewan under quarantine on October 30, 1918. Guards were placed at all roads leading into the town, and nobody could enter or leave without a pass from the health board. The town reached 86 cases of the Spanish Flu in November 1918, representing approximately nine percent of its total population. Fort Saskatchewan did not have its own hospital, so a local home owner, Mrs. Graham, donated her house to be used as a temporary medical facility; four residents were treated there. Three residents died from the Spanish Flu. The town's quarantine lasted for three weeks, and was lifted on November 17, 1918.

=== Provincial jail ===
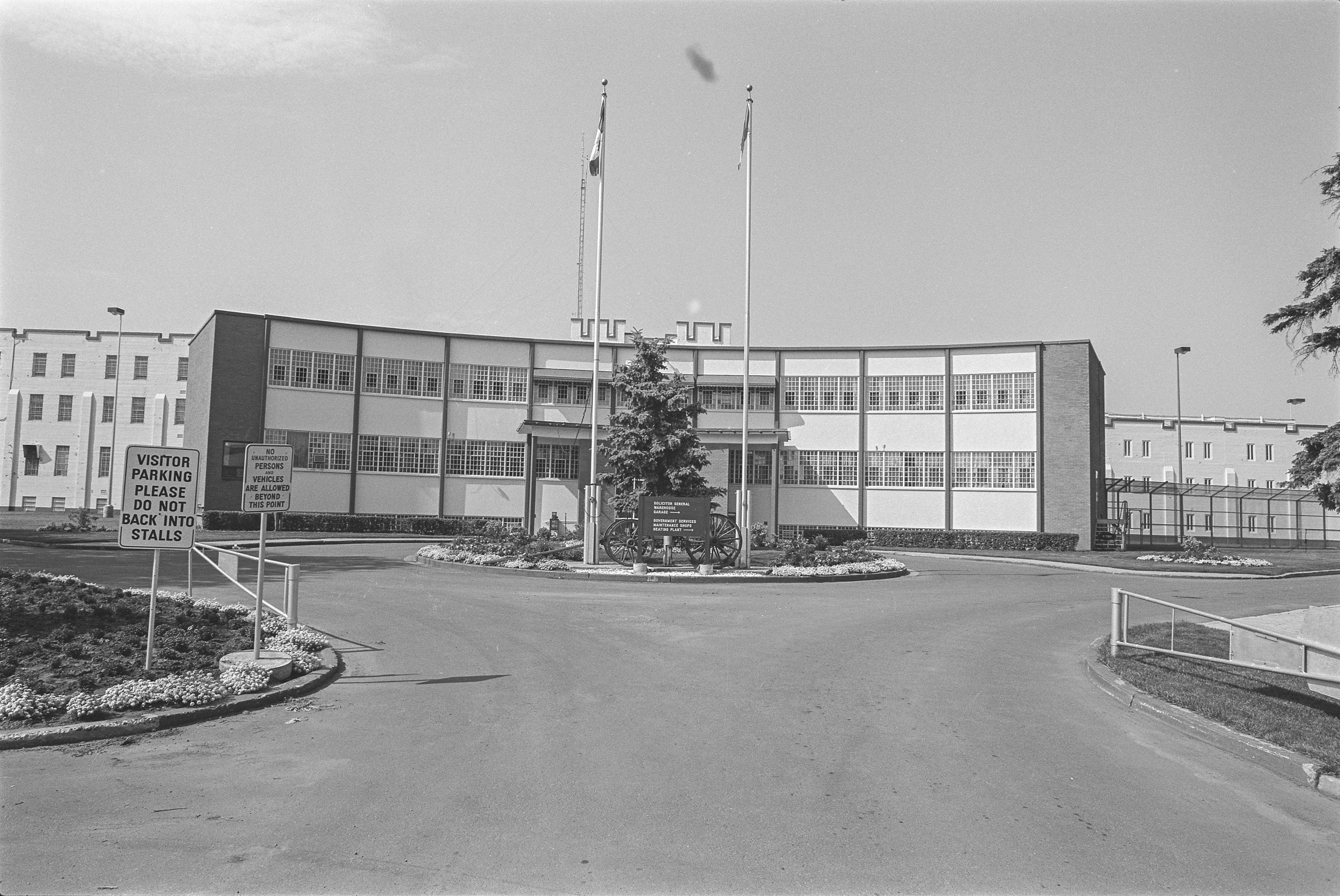
The Fort Saskatchewan Correctional Institute in 1982

A $200,000 provincial jail opened in 1915 on the site of the old fort, to replace the 34-cell guard house that had been used since the NWMP fort was constructed in 1875. This was necessary because by the early 1900s, the guard house was often filled beyond capacity; in August 1912, it held up to 71 prisoners at one time. The fort was demolished after the jail opened, and in 1927 the prison's warden unveiled a cairn on the site of the old guard room, made from stones taken from its foundation, to commemorate the old fort.

There were various additions to the jail throughout the next 70 years, including more cell blocks, a gymnasium, a stand-alone power plant, and carpentry, auto body, and license plate shops. The prison grew food for inmates on a nearby 324 hectare (800 acre) farm. A new house for the warden and his family was completed in 1937, replacing the commanding officer's quarters of 1889. The warden's house was symbolically constructed on municipal grounds near the prison, rather than on the prison grounds themselves — providing convenient access to the prison for the warden while normalizing life for his wife and children. The warden's house was converted into office space in early 1973.

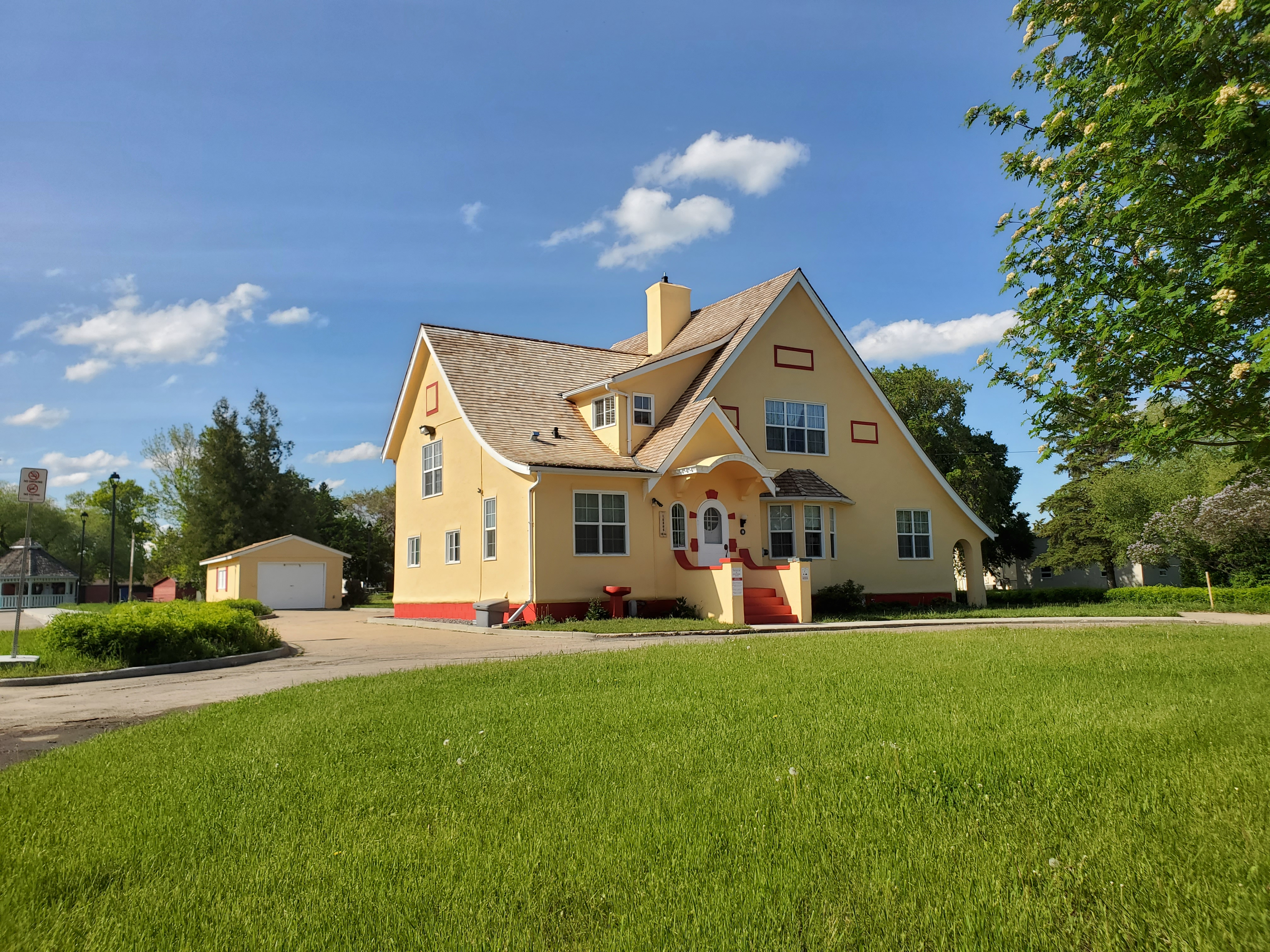
The warden's house shortly after being repainted to its original colour scheme

The prison was primarily used to house people awaiting their trials or serving sentences of under two years, and 29 prisoners were hanged on-site between 1914 and 1960. Noteworthy prisoners who were executed include Florence Lassandro (the only woman hanged in Alberta), and Robert Raymond Cook (the last man to be hanged in Alberta). By 1973, the jail employed 220 people and housed 300 male and female offenders. The jail was replaced in 1988 when a new provincial correctional centre, which houses 546 inmates, was built south of Highway 15 (Veterans Way) on 101 Street. The cell blocks were demolished in 1992. The warden's house is the only remaining structure linked to the old jail; the last building on the actual prison grounds, the facility workshop, was demolished in 2014.

==== Riot ====
96 inmates rioted in the prison dining room on January 19, 1955, led by 12 ringleaders who barricaded themselves in the prison's bakery. The riot started only 24 hours after the chief guard and two other guards were dismissed. Dishes and furniture were thrown and smashed, and a store room in the bakery was destroyed by fire after the ringleaders torched clothing, boots, and other supplies that they found. Prisoners in a cell block believed to contain rioters shouted phrases such as "get the story straight" to nearby reporters. They claimed that they rioted because of the food at the jail. The fire was doused by the local fire department, and the riot was put down by 50 Royal Canadian Mounted Police officers from Edmonton, who were armed with tear gas and smoke grenades. After the ringleaders were pulled from the bakery, they were returned to their cells. The prison had previously seen an inmate sit-down in October 1950, and a small disturbance in March 1949, but this was the most significant act of aggression by inmates that the prison had seen. The riot caused $10,000 worth of damage.

=== 1950–present ===
Sherritt Gordon Mines started construction on a $25-million nickel refinery in 1952, which started production in 1954. As a result, more industries constructed plants in Fort Saskatchewan. Between 1951 and 1956, the town's population doubled from 1,076 to 2,582. Dow Chemical acquired 700 acres in Fort Saskatchewan in 1959, opening its plant in 1961 and further expanding it in 1967. The population increased from 2,972 in 1961, when operations at Dow began, to 4,152 in 1966.

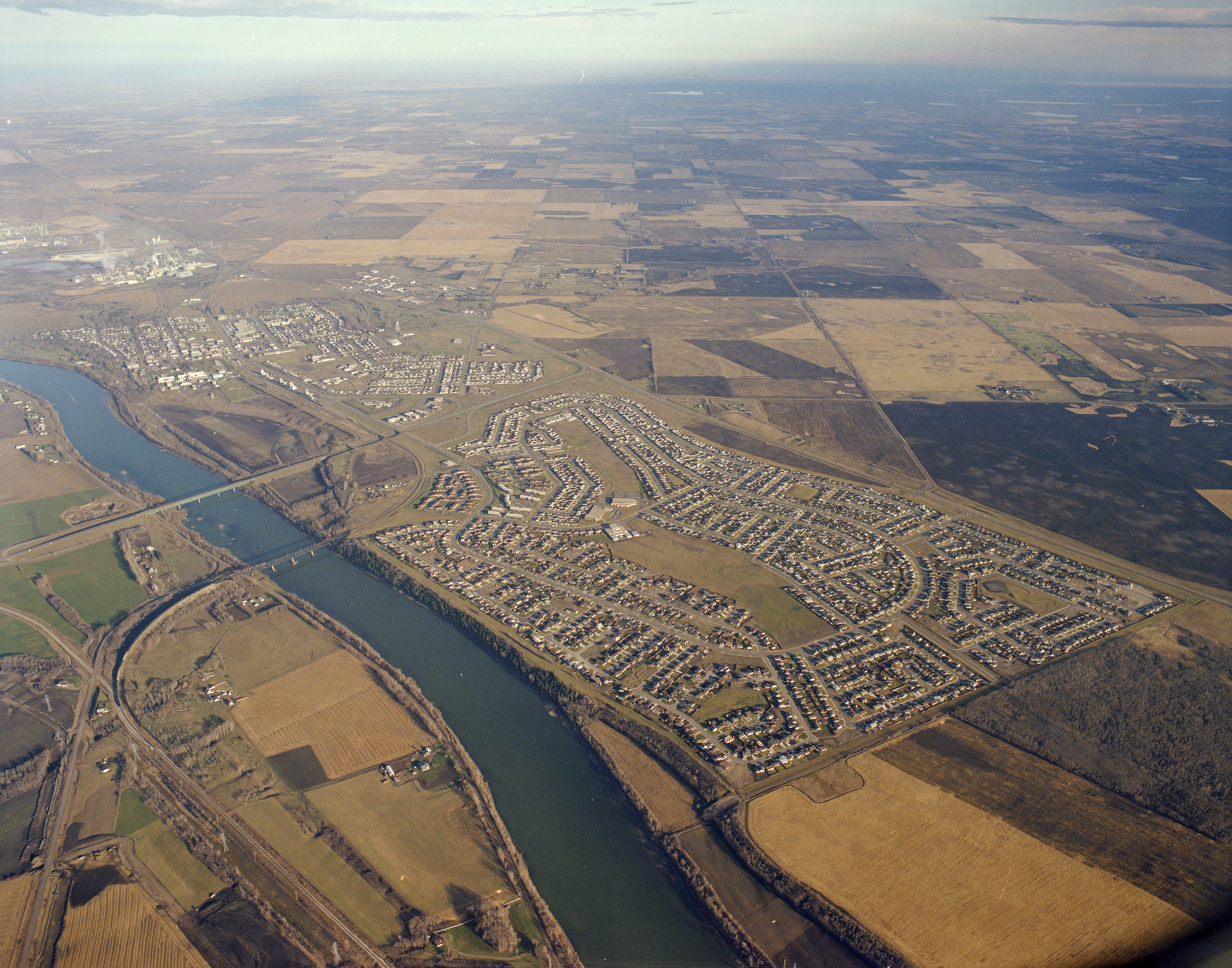
Fort Saskatchewan in 1980

The Fort Saskatchewan Town Police force (est. 1904) was disbanded in 1972, and the RCMP resumed policing duties in the town for the first time since 1917. As part of a royal tour during the XI Commonwealth Games, Queen Elizabeth II and Prince Philip arrived in Fort Saskatchewan from Vegreville via a special train on August 2, 1978. The royal couple met with then-Premier Lougheed on the platform of the CNR station, gave a speech to local residents at Turner Park, and then traveled to Edmonton in a limousine.

Muriel Abdurahman was elected as Fort Saskatchewan's first female mayor in 1980. Abdurahman was elected for a second term in 1983, and she became the first mayor of the City of Fort Saskatchewan after it gained official city status in 1985. She later resigned as mayor to pursue a career in provincial politics, and was succeeded by Pryce Alderson.

Fort Saskatchewan annexed 952 hectares (2,350 acres) of land from Strathcona County on January 1, 2020. The land is mainly located south of the city's old boundaries. Fort Saskatchewan originally requested 2,000 hectares (4,900 acres) from Strathcona County, including industrial land to the north, but the two municipalities negotiated an agreement involving less land.

Since Fort Saskatchewan was incorporated as a town in 1904, it has had 30 residents serve as its mayor as of 2021.

==== Annexation dispute ====
Fort Saskatchewan submitted a bid to annex 784 hectares (1,940 acres) of industrial land to its east from Strathcona County in 1988. Dow Chemical was constructing a plant on some of this land, and the refinery was expected to generate $4 million in tax revenues once it was complete. After Fort Saskatchewan declined to split Dow's taxes between the two municipalities, and in protest over being "chiseled away" by its urban neighbours, Strathcona County submitted a counter-bid to the Local Authorities Board in 1989 to retake 1,400 hectares (3,500 acres) of land from Fort Saskatchewan. The claim encompassed most of Fort Saskatchewan's tax-rich industrial land, which had been ceded to the city in 1959. In the late 1980s, Fort Saskatchewan had the richest tax base in the Edmonton Area, with 74% involving commercial or industrial properties, and it had the lowest homeowners tax in the region. After the provincial government tried unsuccessfully to mediate an agreement between the two sides in late 1989, the Edmonton Metropolitan Regional Planning Commission voted in 1990 in favour of Fort Saskatchewan's bid, and rejected Strathcona County's counter-bid.

As the dispute continued into late 1990, Fort Saskatchewan purchased a full-page advertisement in the Edmonton Journal, urging the provincial government to respect the Local Authorities Board's "non-political decision", regardless of what its verdict was. The province announced that Fort Saskatchewan's bid was successful in 1991, stating that the city would annex 1,144 hectares (2,830 acres) of land from Strathcona County on December 31, 1991. In turn, the county would be protected from further annexations for 20 years, and the two municipalities would have to reach an agreement on tax-sharing. The two sides continued to face difficulties negotiating with one another, and neither believed that an arbitration process could be agreed upon. In March 1992, a Court of Queen's Bench judge ruled in favour of Strathcona County. He declared that over the next 19 years, the county was to receive approximately $27 million in tax revenue from the land annexed by Fort Saskatchewan, while the city would receive about $55 million of tax revenue over that same period. Mayor Pryce Alderson of Fort Saskatchewan, and Reeve Iris Evans of Strathcona County, issued a joint statement that welcomed the decision, stating that they would work together moving forward.

== Geography ==
=== Climate ===
Fort Saskatchewan has a humid continental climate (Köppen: Dfb) with warm summers and cold winters. Precipitation peaks during summer time, and snowfall peaks from November to January.

Climate data for Fort Saskatchewan
Month	Jan	Feb	Mar	Apr	May	Jun	Jul	Aug	Sep	Oct	Nov	Dec	Year
Record high °C (°F)	10.0 (50.0)	20.0 (68.0)	22.5 (72.5)	31.1 (88.0)	34.0 (93.2)	34.4 (93.9)	36.5 (97.7)	36.0 (96.8)	34.5 (94.1)	31.0 (87.8)	19.0 (66.2)	12.5 (54.5)	36.5 (97.7)
Mean daily maximum °C (°F)	−6.4 (20.5)	−3.1 (26.4)	1.9 (35.4)	10.9 (51.6)	17.8 (64.0)	21.3 (70.3)	23.6 (74.5)	23.1 (73.6)	18.3 (64.9)	10.4 (50.7)	0.9 (33.6)	−5 (23)	9.5 (49.1)
Daily mean °C (°F)	−12.8 (9.0)	−9.2 (15.4)	−4 (25)	4.7 (40.5)	10.9 (51.6)	14.9 (58.8)	17.3 (63.1)	16.3 (61.3)	11.4 (52.5)	4.4 (39.9)	−4.3 (24.3)	−10.2 (13.6)	3.3 (37.9)
Mean daily minimum °C (°F)	−17.8 (0.0)	−15.2 (4.6)	−9.5 (14.9)	−1.9 (28.6)	4.1 (39.4)	8.6 (47.5)	11.0 (51.8)	9.7 (49.5)	4.5 (40.1)	−1.4 (29.5)	−9.6 (14.7)	−15.4 (4.3)	−2.7 (27.1)
Record low °C (°F)	−45 (−49)	−47.5 (−53.5)	−45.6 (−50.1)	−28 (−18)	−9.5 (14.9)	−3.3 (26.1)	0.5 (32.9)	−1 (30)	−10 (14)	−24.5 (−12.1)	−38.5 (−37.3)	−43.9 (−47.0)	−47.5 (−53.5)
Average precipitation mm (inches)	30.3 (1.19)	14.4 (0.57)	22.3 (0.88)	26.9 (1.06)	48.9 (1.93)	78.0 (3.07)	81.9 (3.22)	55.6 (2.19)	39.0 (1.54)	23.2 (0.91)	29.4 (1.16)	22.9 (0.90)	473.0 (18.62)
Average rainfall mm (inches)	0.6 (0.02)	1.1 (0.04)	1.0 (0.04)	18.5 (0.73)	46.7 (1.84)	78.0 (3.07)	81.9 (3.22)	55.6 (2.19)	39.0 (1.54)	15.6 (0.61)	2.5 (0.10)	0.5 (0.02)	341.0 (13.43)
Average snowfall cm (inches)	29.7 (11.7)	13.4 (5.3)	21.3 (8.4)	8.4 (3.3)	2.2 (0.9)	0.0 (0.0)	0.0 (0.0)	0.0 (0.0)	0.0 (0.0)	7.7 (3.0)	27.0 (10.6)	22.8 (9.0)	132.3 (52.1)
Average precipitation days (≥ 0.2 mm)	—	5.4	4.7	6.8	9.5	13.5	15.2	11.7	9.9	7.7	7.7	6.7	106.9
Average rainy days (≥ 0.2 mm)	0.18	0.39	0.63	5.4	9.3	13.5	15.2	11.7	9.9	6.5	1.7	0.24	74.6
Average snowy days (≥ 0.2 cm)	7.9	5.1	4.2	1.8	0.53	0	0	0	0	1.5	6.1	6.5	33.6
Source 1: Environment Canada
Source 2: Precipitation Days Only

=== Neighbourhoods ===
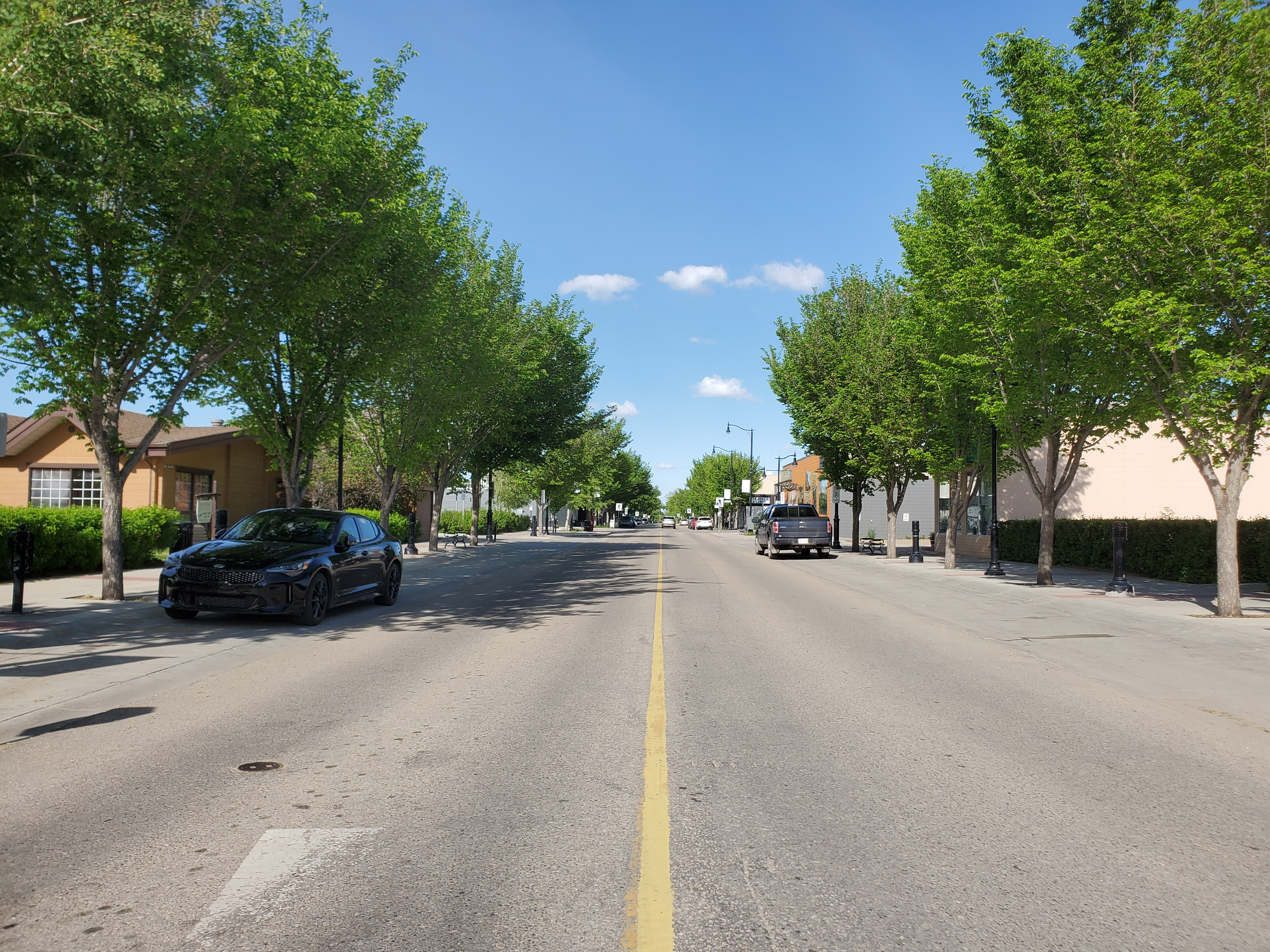
100th Avenue in downtown Fort Saskatchewan

Fort Saskatchewan is divided into seven residential neighbourhoods and two industrial parks. Downtown is the city's oldest neighbourhood, and currently experiencing a larger commercial vacancy rate than the local average due to its low catchment area. Bridgeview, Clover Park, Pineview, and Sherridon are mature residential neighbourhoods, and Westpark and Southfort — the city's newest neighbourhoods — are still under development as of 2021. Eastgate Business Park and the Industrial Business Park both sit on the eastern edge of the city.

== Demographics ==
Federal census population history
Year	Pop.	±%
1901	306	—
1906	585	+91.2%
1911	782	+33.7%
1916	993	+27.0%
1921	982	−1.1%
1926	943	−4.0%
1931	1,001	+6.2%
1936	899	−10.2%
1941	903	+0.4%
1946	921	+2.0%
1951	1,076	+16.8%
1956	2,582	+140.0%
1961	2,972	+15.1%
1966	4,152	+39.7%
1971	5,726	+37.9%
1976	8,304	+45.0%
1981	12,169	+46.5%
1986	11,983	−1.5%
1991	12,078	+0.8%
1996	12,408	+2.7%
2001	13,121	+5.7%
2006	14,957	+14.0%
2011	19,051	+27.4%
2016	24,149	+26.8%
2021	27,464	+13.7%
Sources: Statistics Canada and City of Fort Saskatchewan

In the 2021 Census of Population conducted by Statistics Canada, the City of Fort Saskatchewan had a population of 27,464 living in 10,570 of its 11,046 total private dwellings, a change of 13.6% from its 2016 population of 24,169. With a land area of 56.5 km^{2} (21.8 sq mi), it had a population density of 486.1/km^{2} (1,259.0/sq mi) in 2021.

According to its 2023 municipal census, the population of Fort Saskatchewan is 28,624, representing an increase of 6.24% from the 2019 municipal census.

Fort Saskatchewan's population, according to its 2019 municipal census, is 26,942; a change of 2.3% from its 2018 municipal census population of 26,328.

In the 2016 Census of Population conducted by Statistics Canada, the City of Fort Saskatchewan had a population of 24,149 living in 9,261 of its 9,939 total private dwellings, a change of 26.8% from its 2011 population of 19,051. With a land area of 48.18 km^{2} (18.60 sq mi), it had a population density of 501.2/km^{2} (1,298.2/sq mi) in 2016.

As of 2016, the top three areas of employment are: Trades, transport and equipment operators and related occupations (3,140 residents), sales and service occupations (2,685), and business, finance and administration occupations (1,915 residents). The three most common levels of education are: Post secondary certificate, diploma or degree (10,420 residents), secondary (high) school diploma or equivalency certificate (5,735 residents), and college, CEGEP or other non-university certificate or diploma (4,565 residents).

=== Ethnicity ===
According to the 2016 census, the largest visible minority populations in the community are Filipino with 535 residents, followed by South Asian with 350 residents. 1,390 residents identified as Aboriginal in 2016: 415 as First Nations, 965 as Métis, and 15 as Inuk (Inuit). 15 residents also claimed multiple Aboriginal identities, bringing the total number of Aboriginal identity claims to 1,410.

Panethnic groups in the City of Fort Saskatchewan (2001−2021)
Panethnic group	2021		2016		2011		2006		2001	
Panethnic group	Pop.	%	Pop.	%	Pop.	%	Pop.	%	Pop.	%
European (Note: Statistic includes all persons that did not make up part of a visible minority or an indigenous identity.)	22,200	83.57%	20,795	87.48%	16,965	90.26%	14,005	94.88%	12,490	96.78%
Indigenous	1,915	7.21%	1,420	5.97%	1,105	5.88%	440	2.98%	240	1.86%
Southeast Asian (Note: Statistic includes total responses of "Filipino" and "Southeast Asian" under visible minority section on census.)	990	3.73%	570	2.4%	260	1.38%	55	0.37%	20	0.15%
South Asian	505	1.9%	350	1.47%	95	0.51%	25	0.17%	40	0.31%
African	410	1.54%	180	0.76%	215	1.14%	45	0.3%	30	0.23%
Latin American	175	0.66%	70	0.29%	45	0.24%	50	0.34%	30	0.23%
East Asian (Note: Statistic includes total responses of "Chinese", "Korean", and "Japanese" under visible minority section on census.)	155	0.58%	210	0.88%	85	0.45%	120	0.81%	50	0.39%
Middle Eastern (Note: Statistic includes total responses of "West Asian" and "Arab" under visible minority section on census.)	70	0.26%	95	0.4%	0	0%	10	0.07%	0	0%
Other/multiracial (Note: Statistic includes total responses of "Visible minority, n.i.e." and "Multiple visible minorities" under visible minority section on census.)	160	0.6%	70	0.29%	0	0%	15	0.1%	10	0.08%
Total responses	26,565	98.07%	23,770	98.35%	18,795	98.66%	14,760	98.68%	12,905	98.35%
Total population	27,088	100%	24,169	100%	19,051	100%	14,957	100%	13,121	100%
Note: Totals greater than 100% due to multiple origin responses

=== Language ===
Regarding the official languages of Canada, 22,160 residents are proficient only in English, 15 are only proficient in French, 1,385 residents are bilingual, and 60 residents are not proficient in either official language.

== Economy ==
Fort Saskatchewan's main industries are commercial and heavy industry. It is part of Alberta's Industrial Heartland, the largest Canadian industrial area west of Toronto. Companies with operations in the area include Dow Chemical, Sherritt International, Nutrien (formerly Agrium) and Shell Canada. These plants are major employers for residents of Fort Saskatchewan and the surrounding area.

The city has attracted a number of major retailers including Wal-Mart, The Home Depot, Canadian Tire, Safeway, Federated CO-OP, and Freson Bros. Fort Saskatchewan has also developed as a regional hub for stores and services; in 2019 it served a catchment area of approximately 75,000 people, both locally and from communities to its north and east, including Lamont, Bruderheim, and Redwater.

=== Fort Station Mall ===
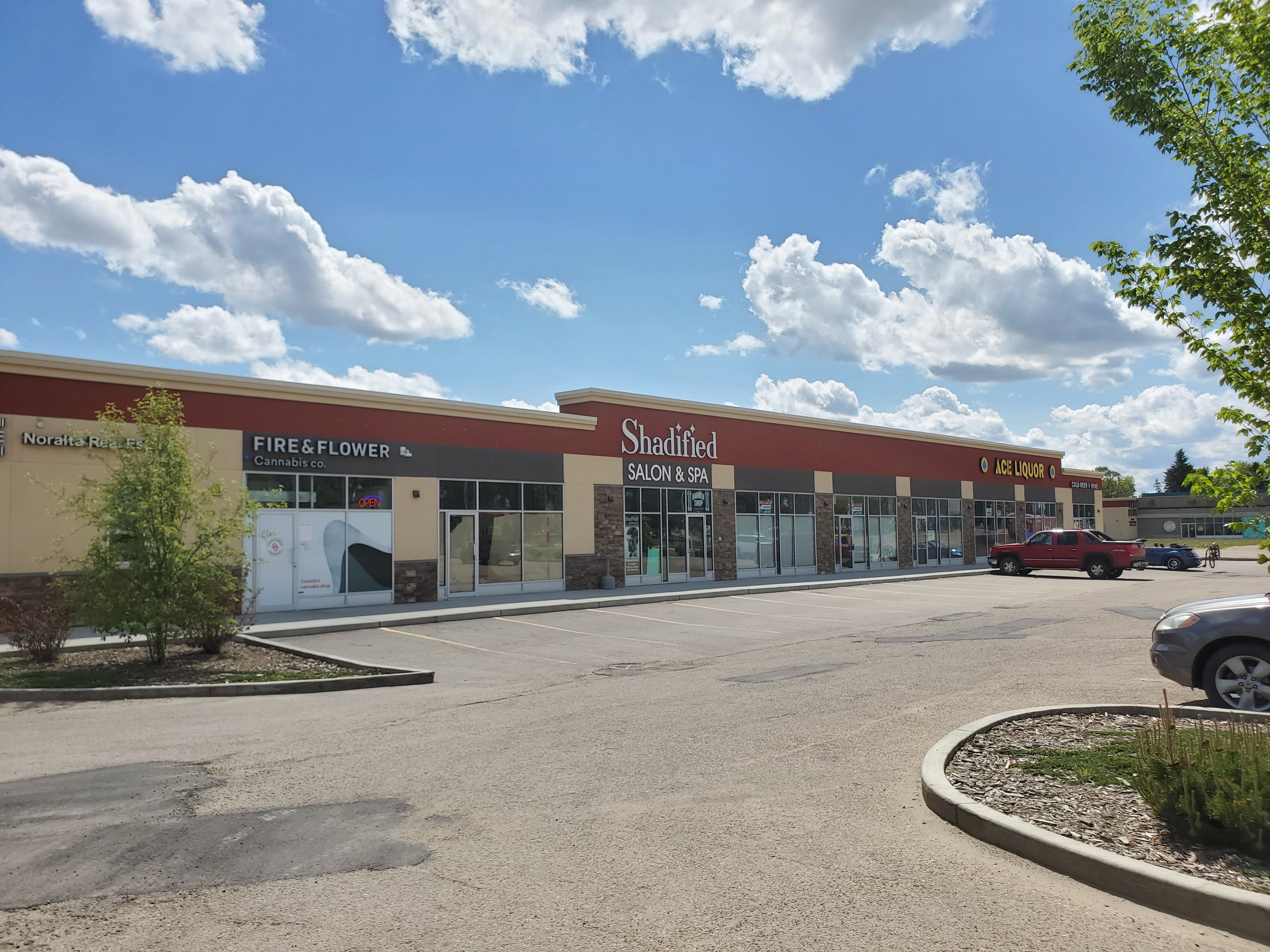
A commercial building at the Fort Station Mall

The original Fort Mall was located on a 49,000-square-metre (12-acre) parcel on the east side of downtown, and contained 16,000 square metres (170,000 sq ft) of retail space. On September 15, 2015, Haro Developments opened phase one of its redevelopment of the site, which it renamed Fort Station Mall. The majority of the old mall was demolished and replaced with outward-facing commercial units. Future plans for development include the construction of additional commercial units, apartments, and an assisted-living facility for seniors. A report commissioned by the City of Fort Saskatchewan noted: "As of 2019, there is another phase of the site, yet to be redeveloped, but the project continues to progress towards completion."

== Attractions ==
=== Recreational ===
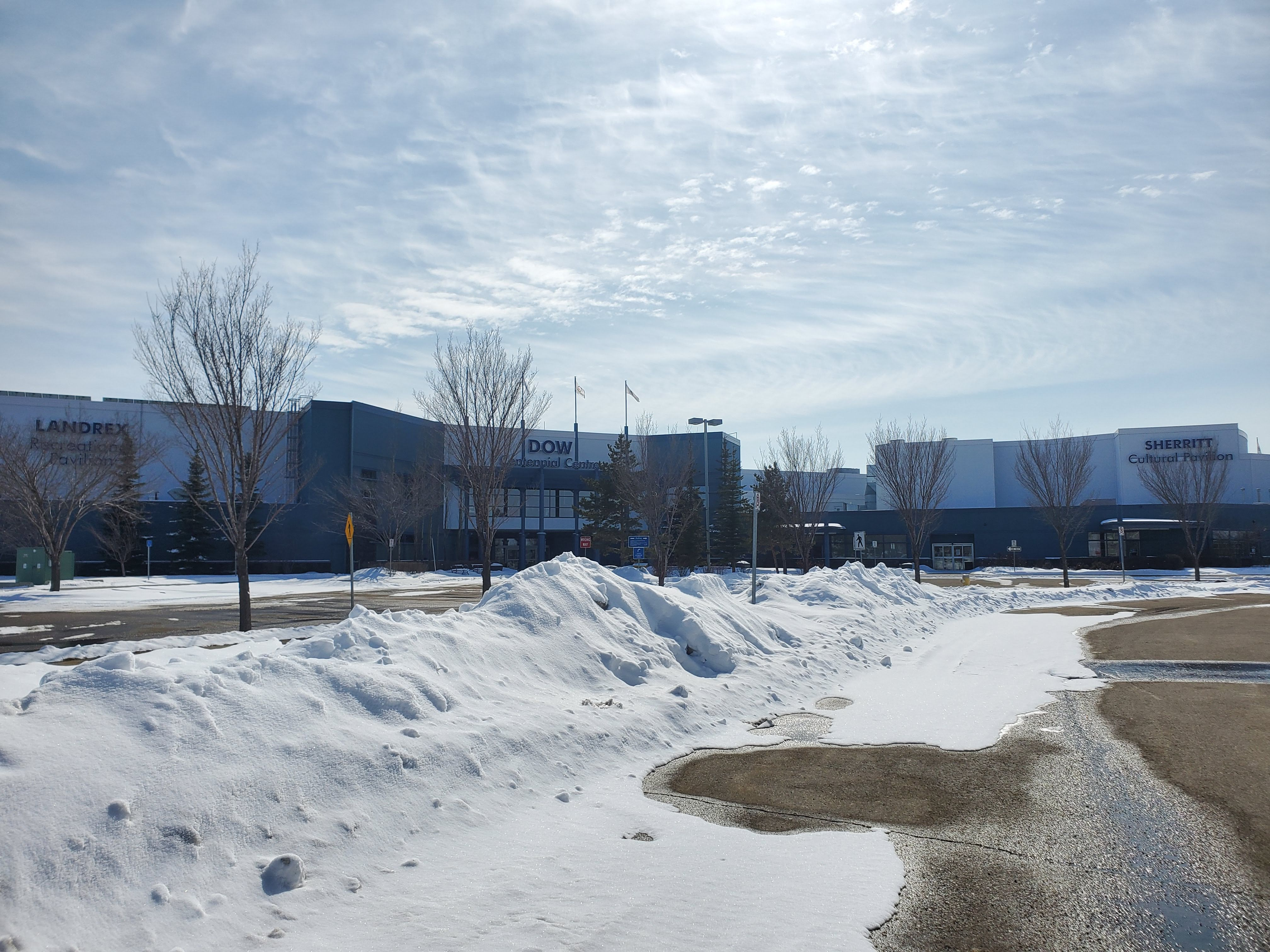
The Dow Centennial Centre

The centerpiece of Fort Saskatchewan's recreation and culture is the Dow Centennial Centre, a multi-use facility that includes an ice arena, gymnasium, field house, indoor track and fitness centre. The facility, which opened in September 2004, also features a 550-seat performing arts theatre, a permanent art gallery with monthly shows, a banquet hall and the local pottery guild.

The city has two other indoor ice arenas the Jubilee Recreation Centre and the Sportsplex, that are used during the winter months by hockey, ringette and figure skating associations. In the summer months, the lacrosse association uses them. Fort Saskatchewan also has Harbour Pool: An indoor swimming pool with a hot tub, sauna, and slide. The city opened Taurus Field in 2018 – a FIFA-certified artificial turf field for soccer and football matches. It features seating for more than 1000 people, a press box, four large dressing rooms, and lights surrounding the field.

There is one nine-hole golf course located within the city's boundaries, and a six-sheet curling club; they are both operated by the Fort Golf and Curling Club. The city's west end features a boat launch into the North Saskatchewan River, called Red Coat Landing, and a provincially preserved natural area called the Fort Saskatchewan Prairie. Elk Island National Park is located southeast of the city.

==== Trail network ====
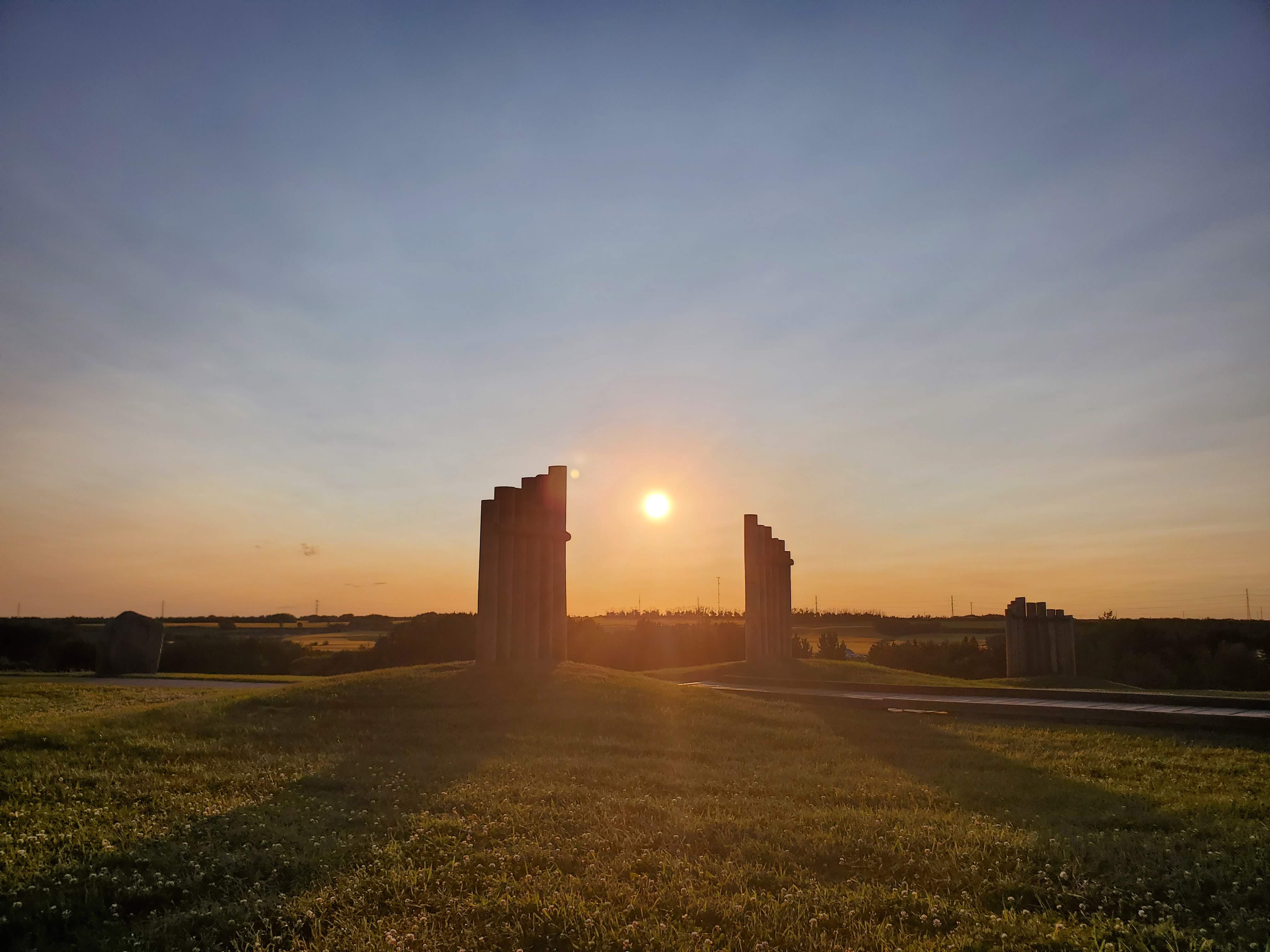
The Heritage Precinct Loop crosses the site of the original N.W.M.P. fort, whose original gateways and corners are indicated by wooden markers

Fort Saskatchewan has over 75 km (47 mi) of paved multi-use trails as of 2021, including approximately 20 km (12 mi) throughout the river valley and the city's parks. A pedestrian bridge crossing the North Saskatchewan River has been under construction since 2019; once completed it will connect Fort Saskatchewan's trail network to Sturgeon County's trails. This is part of the Trans Canada Trail network, reflecting Fort Saskatchewan's status as a hub for numerous provincial and national trails.

=== Cultural ===
The 11 hectare (27 acre) Fort Heritage Precinct is a municipally operated museum and historic site. It contains a variety of historically significant buildings from the area which form a historical village. The Fort Heritage Precinct features a full-scale replica of the original NWMP fort, which can be explored in guided tours. Phase one of the replica fort, which included the Men's Quarters and the Officers' Quarters, opened in 2011. The fort also features a horse stable, a guard room with jail cells, and an ice house which was completed in the summer of 2015.

The replica fort was constructed beside the site of the original fort to preserve the original site's archaeological integrity. The city has placed eight wooden markers to show the position of the original fort: one marker is at each of the four corners where the wall once stood, and two sets of markers indicate the positions of the original east and west gates (which provided access to the settlement and to the river respectively).

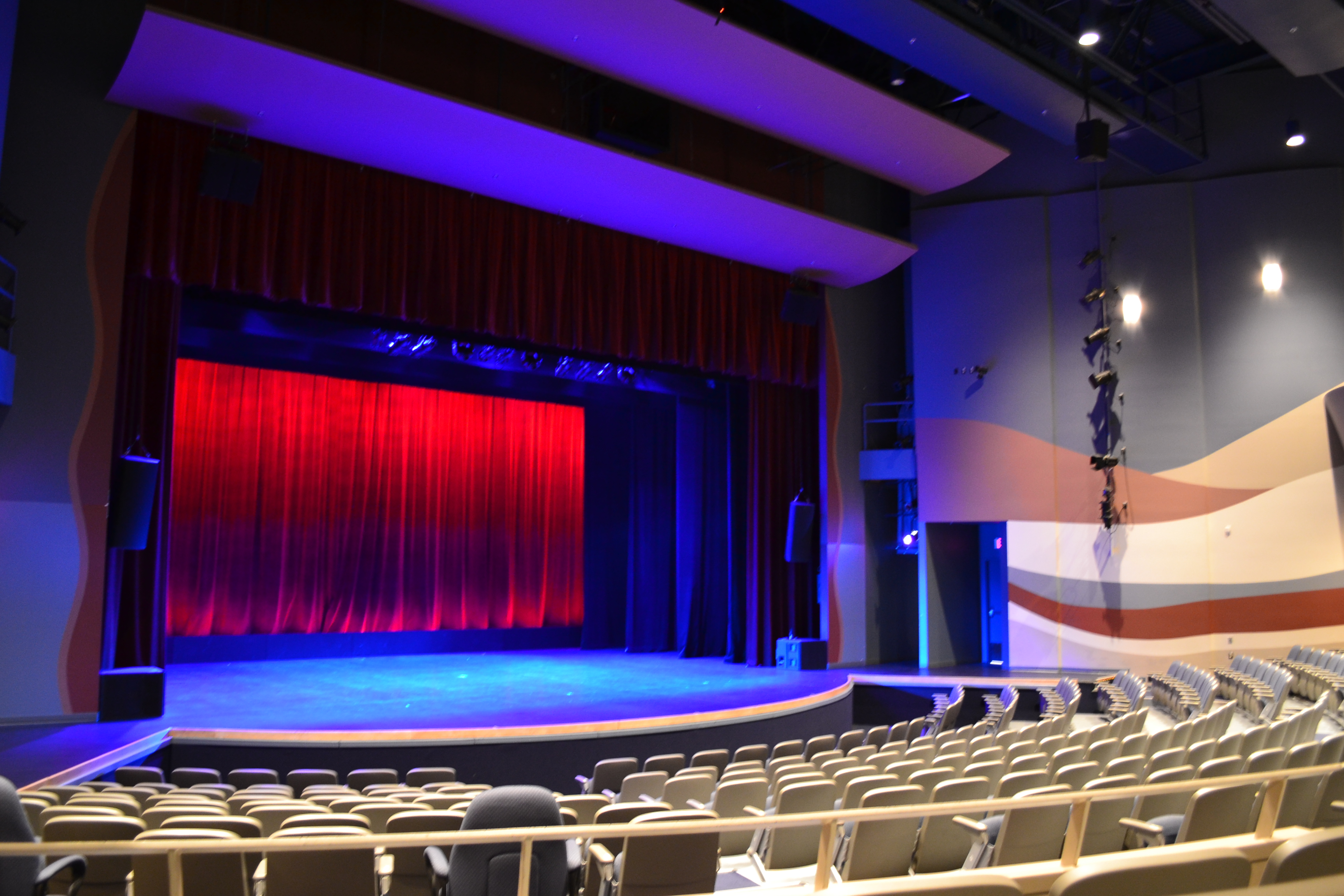
The Shell Theatre inside the Dow Centennial Centre

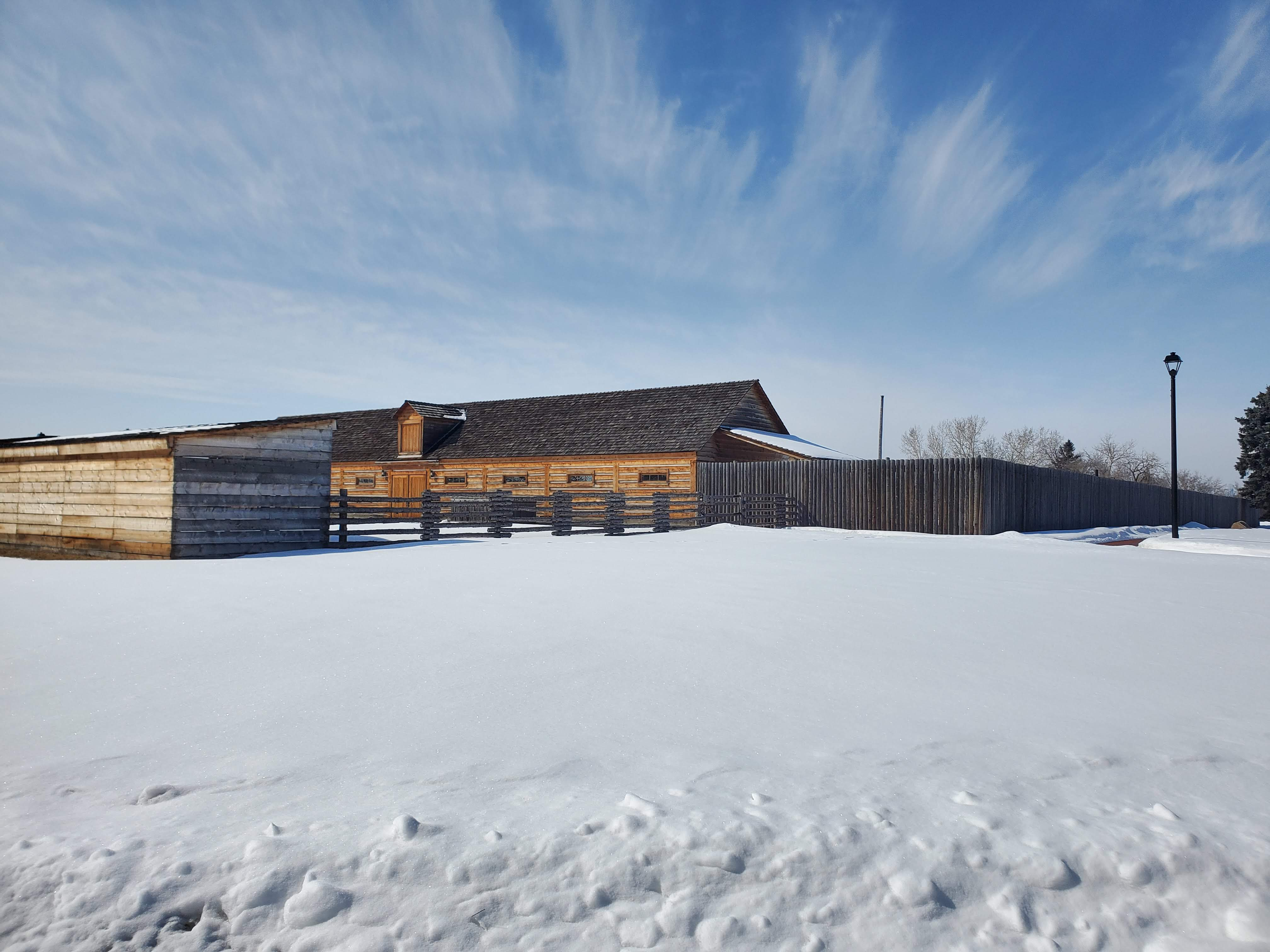
The replica of the original Fort Saskatchewan

The historical society hosts a two-day event called "The Peoples of the North Saskatchewan" every May, which educates students about Métis and settler cultures. A flock of sheep are kept at the Heritage Precinct every summer to maintain the grass, and members of the public are allowed to interact with them. The city's mascot is a sheep mascot named Auggie, which is a reference to the North West Company's Fort Augustus which was located nearby.

Fort Saskatchewan is served by a public library located in the same building as City Hall. The city is also home to a local theatre group, called The Sheeptown Players Drama Society, which regularly performs throughout the community.

== Sports ==
The Pyramid Corp. Hawks of the Capital Junior Hockey League play out of the Jubilee Recreation Centre. The Fort Saskatchewan Traders, of the Alberta Junior Hockey League, relocated to St. Albert in 2007, and renamed the St. Albert Steel.

Fort Saskatchewan is home to the Heartland Roller Derby Association, a flat-track roller-derby league formed in 2016. There are youth sports associations for hockey, soccer (indoor and outdoor), baseball, ringette, indoor lacrosse, and figure skating, and sports associations for cross-country skiing and swimming.

== Infrastructure ==
=== Emergency services ===
==== Policing ====
The Royal Canadian Mounted Police's K Division maintains a detachment which serves Fort Saskatchewan and the surrounding region. In 2015, the detachment moved into a new 5,100 m^{2} (55,000 sq ft) station, which also houses the city's protective services and municipal enforcement personnel. A local police official predicted that the new location, which provides direct access to Highway 21 (Veterans Way), would allow officers to cut emergency response times by 60–90 seconds. The station features a boardroom that local organizations are able to use. The Families First Society, a local not-for-profit resource centre for families, parents, and children, moved into the old police station in April 2016.

==== Fire department ====
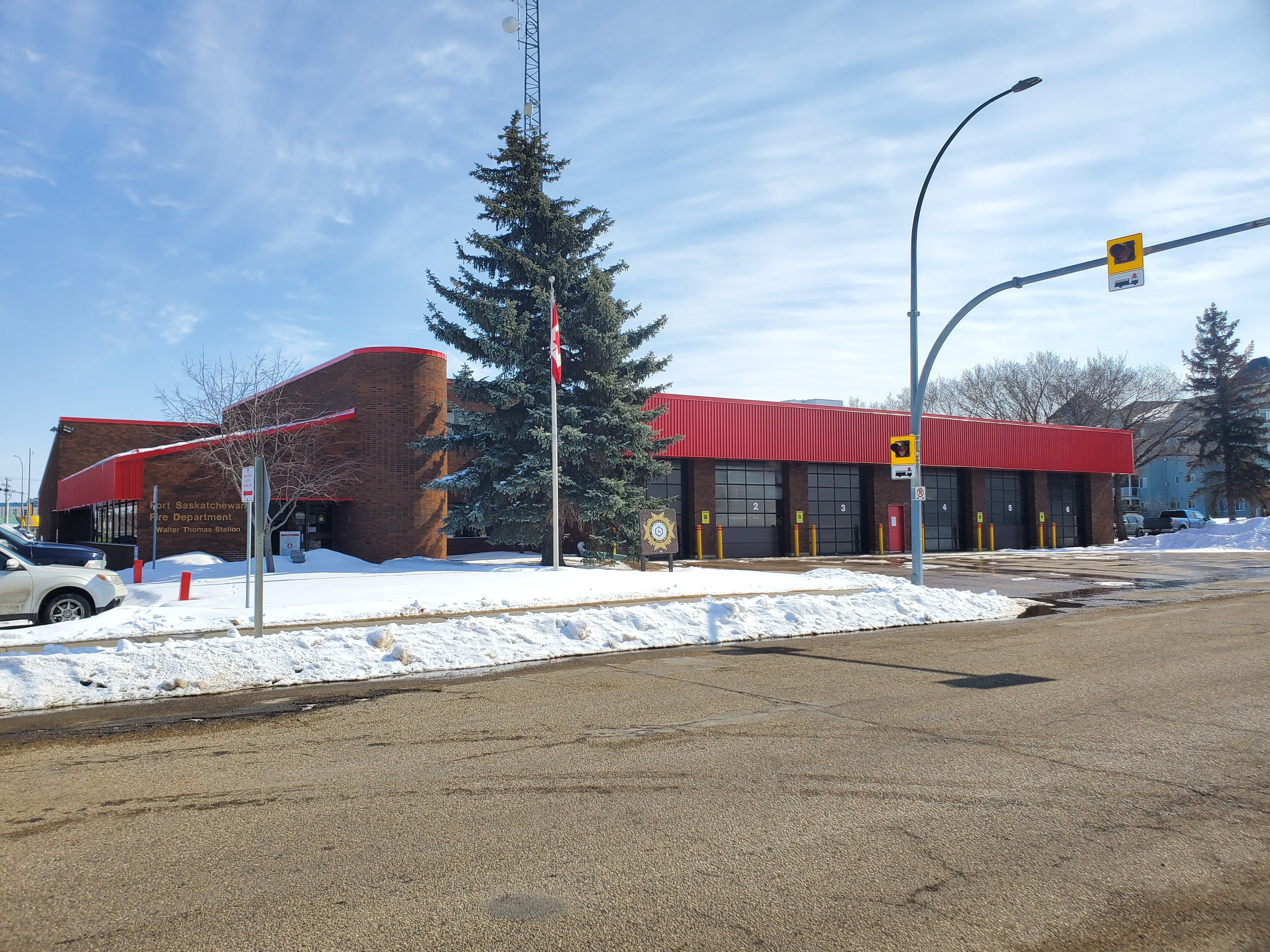
Fort Saskatchewan Fire Department's Walter Thomas Station

The Fire Department (est. 1906), based at the Walter Thomas Fire Station, is staffed by 14 full-time firefighters who are supported by part time firefighters and three full-time administrative staff. The full-time firefighters rotate between a 10-hour day shift and a 14-hour night shift.

The full-time staffing model was introduced in early 2020. Prior to its introduction, the fire station was vacant every evening, and paid on-call volunteers would have to travel to the station before they could respond to an emergency. The introduction of full-time staff has reduced response times from up to 15 minutes, to a standard of 105 seconds in 2019. New sleeping quarters were constructed at the fire station to accommodate the full-time staff.

The city purchased property for a second fire station in 2017, reflecting the increase in call volumes coming from its newer neighbourhoods.

Fort Saskatchewan was also home to Canada's longest serving firefighter: Walter Thomas (1922–2017). Walter joined the department on May 1, 1947, and served until May 2017, a few months before he died. Walter's last position in the department was as its official historian.

=== Public health ===
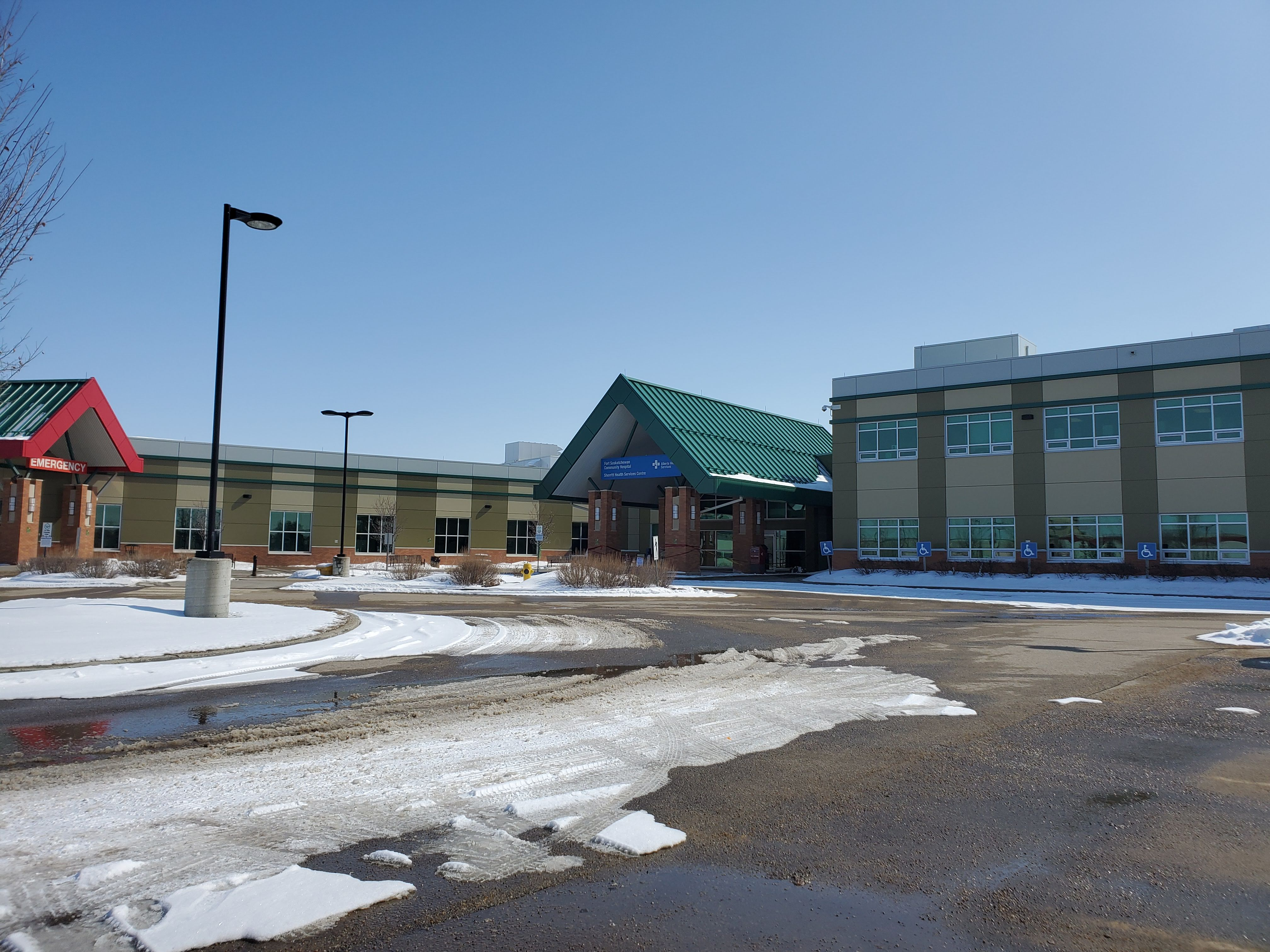
The Fort Saskatchewan Community Hospital

Fort Saskatchewan has one hospital — the 38-bed Fort Saskatchewan Community Hospital. It opened in 2012 to replace the city's aging health centre. It is attached to a new health facility that provides home care, mental health, rehabilitation, community health, and child and family services.

The city also has a 58-bed, publicly operated, supportive-living seniors lodge, called Dr. Turner Lodge. Southfort Bend, a privately operated facility, also has supportive living for seniors. The lone assisted-living facility in Fort Saskatchewan, the Rivercrest Care Centre, is also home to a hospice.

Fort Air Partnership (FAP) monitors the air quality of the 4,500-square-kilometre (1,700 sq mi) airshed located immediately north and east of Edmonton. FAP maintains 10 continuous monitoring stations — three of which are located in Fort Saskatchewan — and 47 passive monitoring stations.

=== Public transit ===
Fort Sask Transit (FST) operates two daily routes, which mostly traverse the same parts of the city but go in opposite directions. To help facilitate regional travel, Strathcona County Transit is contracted by Fort Saskatchewan to provide peak-hour service between Fort Saskatchewan and the Bethel Transit Terminal in Sherwood Park. All three routes terminate at the FST park and ride at the Dow Centennial Centre. All of FST's buses are accessible to riders with mobility issues, and the Special Transportation Service Society, a volunteer service operated by the Fort Saskatchewan Lions Club, offers a specialized minivan service for people who cannot use regular transit options because of physical disabilities.

=== Utilities ===
Fort Saskatchewan's water is supplied by the Capital Region Northeast Water Services Commission. The commission purchases water from the Edmonton-based utilities company EPCOR, which supplies treated water from the North Saskatchewan River. Waste water is treated at a facility in Strathcona County, which is owned by the Alberta Capital Region Wastewater Commission. EPCOR provides the Regulated Retail Offering for electricity in Fort Saskatchewan, and the wire service (distribution and transmission) is provided by Fortis Alberta. Direct Energy Regulated Services provides regulated natural gas to the city, and its distribution is provided by ATCO.

=== Waste management ===
Fort Saskatchewan's residents separate their household waste into three categories: organic waste is put into green bins, garbage is picked up in black bins, and recycling is collected in blue bags. The three-stream system was introduced in June 2018, after a successful pilot program. Garbage is collected bi-weekly, organics are collected weekly or bi-weekly depending on the time of year, and recycling is collected weekly. Blue bins were used for recycling in the pilot program, but the city reverted to blue bags when launching the new waste system city-wide. This was because objects could get jammed in the blue bins, and crews could not easily tell if the loads inside blue bins were contaminated like they could with blue bags. Prior to the introduction of this system, the municipality contracted out collection of garbage and recycling only; recycling was collected in blue bags, but garbage cans were not regulated by the city.

== Government ==
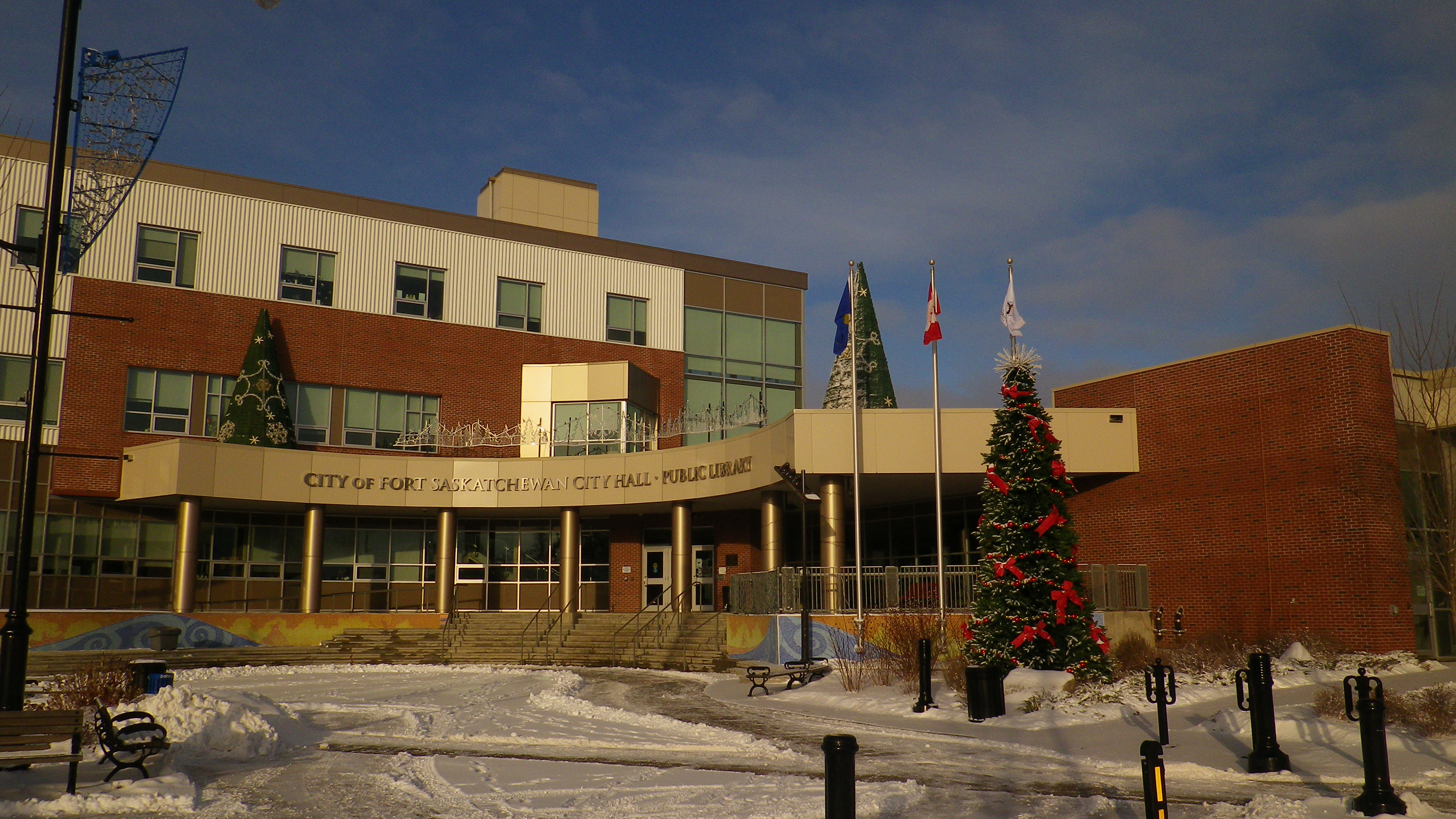
Fort Saskatchewan City Hall and Public Library

Fort Saskatchewan is directly governed by a city council consisting of one mayor and six councillors. Municipal elections, which are non-partisan, occur every four years on the third Monday in October. The last election was held on October 18, 2021, where Gale Katchur was re-elected for a fourth term as Mayor; becoming the longest-serving Mayor in Fort Saskatchewan's history. The mayor is elected separately from the councilors, who are elected at-large (as opposed to the ward system).

Fort Saskatchewan federal election results
Year	Liberal		Conservative		New Democratic		Green	
2021	8%	1,149	59%	8,197	22%	3,016	1%	154
2019	7%	1,064	76%	10,750	12%	1,762	2%	299

Fort Saskatchewan provincial election results
Year	United Cons.		New Democratic	
2019	47%	5,477	36%	4,191

At the provincial level of government, Fort Saskatchewan is part of the Fort Saskatchewan-Vegreville riding, which has been represented by Jackie Armstrong-Homeniuk (United Conservative Party) since 2019.

At the federal level, Fort Saskatchewan is part of the Sherwood Park—Fort Saskatchewan riding and is represented by Garnett Genuis (Conservative Party of Canada).

In 2024, Mayor Gale Katchur made headlines when she advocated for the killing of feral cats at a televised committee meeting. She claimed that in the past, farmers in Fort Saskatchewan would "drown cats in the river" or "burn them on exhaust pipes". She later apologized.

== Education ==
Fort Saskatchewan has no post-secondary schools that are open to the public, but its corrections centre partners with NorQuest College to provide academic upgrading, personal development courses, and employment training courses to inmates. Most residents of Fort Saskatchewan commute or move to Edmonton to attend post-secondary classes at the University of Alberta, MacEwan University, or NAIT.

Fort Saskatchewan's schools are governed by two different school boards – Elk Island Public Schools and Elk Island Catholic Schools. Both school boards have their head offices located in Sherwood Park. Fort Saskatchewan's elected trustees on the EIPS board are Heather Wall and Harvey Stadnick. Al Stewart is the lone Fort Saskatchewan trustee on the EICS board.

== Media ==
Fort Saskatchewan has two local newspapers. The Fort Saskatchewan Record (The Fort Record) is a weekly home-delivered newspaper published on Thursdays. It took over the offices and plant of The Conservator, the previous weekly newspaper, and was first published on April 5, 1922. The Sturgeon Creek Post, established in 1996, is a weekly newspaper published on Wednesdays that is available at local businesses and newsstands. The Edmonton Journal and the Edmonton Sun are also distributed in the community.

Fort Saskatchewan has one local radio station that broadcasts live. It is branded Mix 107.9 FM, and owned by Kenner Media Ltd. Fort Saskatchewan had an internet radio station named FortRadio.com, which came online in November 2010.

== See also ==
- List of communities in Alberta
