= T3 Transit =

Public transit company serving Charlottetown

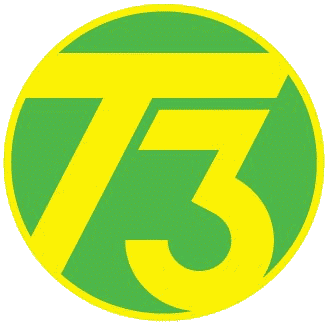
- Parent: City of Charlottetown
- Founded: 2005
- Headquarters: 7 Mount Edward Rd., Charlottetown, PE; C1A 5R7
- Locale: Prince Edward Island
- Service area: Urban
- Service type: Bus
- Routes: 12
- Fleet: approximately 12
- Annual ridership: 450,000
- Fuel type: Diesel
- Operator: Coach Atlantic Group
- Chief executive: Mike Cassidy
- Website: www.t3transit.ca

T3 Transit is a Canadian public transport company operating buses throughout the Greater Charlottetown area of Prince Edward Island, including the towns of Cornwall and Stratford.

== History ==
Original 2005 transit branding

Founded in 2005 as Charlottetown Transit, the 150th anniversary year of the city's incorporation. In 2025, it is funded by the municipal and provincial levels of government and provides service throughout the City of Charlottetown, and the neighbouring towns of Cornwall and Stratford. Federal government funding supports capital purchases of buses. The last prior attempt at launching public transit was in the form of "Charlottetown Urban Transit Systems Limited" from late 1979 to 1981.

The name "Charlottetown Transit" was merely a marketing name and not a legally incorporated company. All buses are owned by the City of Charlottetown but are operated under contract by Trius Transit, of the Coach Atlantic Group owned by the Cassidy family.

In February, 2012, Charlottetown Transit changed its name to T3 Transit. The new brand offers services to Charlottetown, Cornwall, and Stratford, as well as in Summerside.

In the early days of Charlottetown/T3 Transit, most buses are designed to have the appearance of a tram, 'trolley', or streetcar and were constructed by Dupont Industries (Thomas MVP EF Champlain 1608 LF and HF), as well as MCI Classic buses. The trolley buses were smaller than conventional transit bus designs and were easily able to navigate the narrower streets and intersections in the city's downtown core.

In 2018, T3 Transit ran a demonstration with an electric bus, an American made New Flyer Xcelsior CHARGE. The transit agency is considering upgrading its fleet in the future to electric buses.

== Routes ==
Current operations have 10 bus routes running from Monday to Friday, with reduced routes on weekends and some holidays.

=== Greater Charlottetown ===
==== Charlottetown ====
- 1: Downtown – University Avenue
- 2: West Royalty – North River Road
- 3: Sherwood – St. Peter's Road
- 4: Queen Elizabeth Hospital (QEH)
- 5: Spring Park – Belvedere – QEH
- 10: East Royalty
- 11: Sleepy Hollow – Winsloe – Airport
- 23: Hillsborough – Sherwood

==== Stratford ====
- 7B: Stratford Bunbury
- 7K: Stratford Kinlock

==== Cornwall ====
- 9: Cornwall

=== Summerside ===
- County Line (via Transit P.E.I.) – serving points between Summerside and Charlottetown
