= Spring Park, Prince Edward Island =

Spring Park
- Neighbourhood
- Location of Spring Park in PEI
- Coordinates: 46°16′00″N 63°09′00″W
- Country: Canada
- Provinces of Canada: Prince Edward Island
- County: Queens County
- Township: Queens Royalty
- City: City of Charlottetown
- Incorporated Village: January 1, 1954
- Dissolved: April 17, 1958
- Time zone: UTC-4 (AST)
  - Summer (DST): UTC-3 (ADT)
- Canadian Postal code: C1A
- Area code: 902

Spring Park is a Canadian neighbourhood in the city of Charlottetown, Prince Edward Island.

Spring Park derived its name in 1925 from the Spring Park School District whose southern boundary at that time was located along the northern boundary of the city of Charlottetown and west of the villages of Parkdale and Sherwood. The community was defined by Spring Park Road which ran north from the city to serve what was then a rural farming district consisting of 12 acres (4.9 ha) estates in the unincorporated township of Queens Royalty.

Population growth and development pressures in Charlottetown following World War II saw parts of Spring Park south of Kirkwood Drive successively merged into the city. In the early 1950s a new Spring Park School was constructed on Union Street later called Kirkwood Drive; this building stood where the current Charlottetown Police Department is located on Kirkwood Drive. The school district was incorporated as a village in 1954 and was roughly delineated by Eden Street, Kirkwood Drive, Colonel Gray Drive, the east bank of the North River, the southern boundary with West Royalty along Hermitage Creek and the north end of the University of Prince Edward Island campus, and the former railway corridor (now the Confederation Trail).

A municipal building named "Spring Park Hall" and a fire station housing the "Spring Park Volunteer Fire Department" were located on a municipal property named "Spring Park Square" which also included Spring Park School. This property was bounded by University Avenue, Kirkwood Drive, Willow Street and Eden Street. Since it was located outside the city limits, Spring Park Square played host to many larger outdoor events such as circuses from the 1920s-1950s.

The village was dissolved on April 17, 1958 in a municipal amalgamation with the City of Charlottetown. Development pressures on the Spring Park School district by a flood of young families to new subdivisions in the early 1960s saw this school replaced in 1964 by a building located on Dunkirk Street.

Federal census population history of Spring Park
Year	Pop.	±%
1956	1,370	—
Source: Statistics Canada

The neighbourhood is Charlottetown's first post-war suburb and consists of smaller bungalows interspersed with some larger homes and is defined by mature trees lining quiet streets. This is likely the most accessible Charlottetown neighbourhood to services within walking distance with several popular churches, shopping services, restaurants, schools, and employment locations being located within and adjacent to the area. The neighbourhood expanded significantly during the late 1960s with the construction of Colonel Gray High School on the Simmons Estate fronting Spring Park Road immediately south of the former municipal boundary. Residential subdivisions such as Holland Park and Skyview were developed in the late 1960s and 1970s, followed by Westwood and Marysfield in the 1980s and 1990s.
