= Sherwood, Prince Edward Island =

Human settlement in Canada

Coordinates: 46°17′N 63°08′W

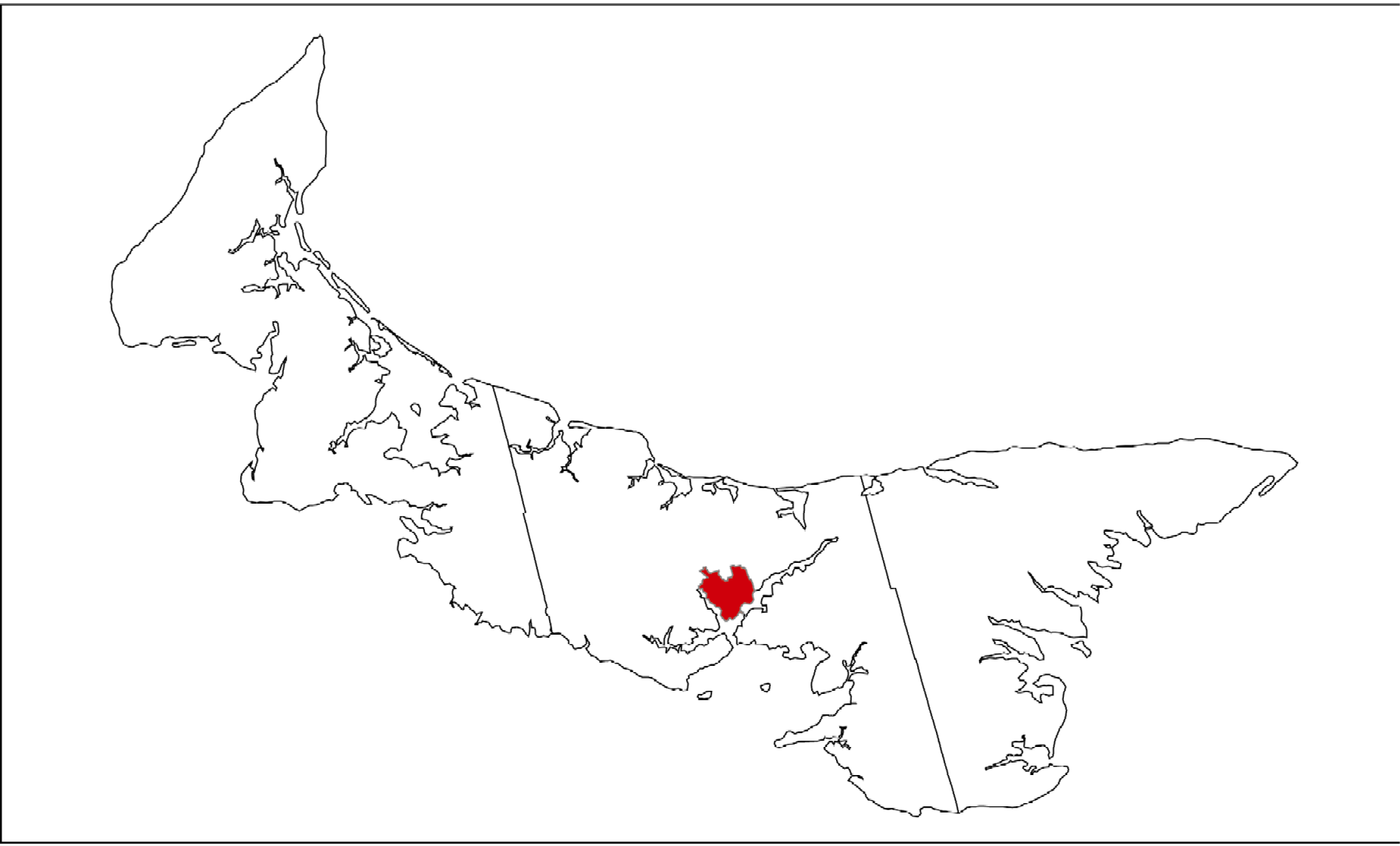
Location of Charlottetown, PEI

Federal census population history of Sherwood
Year	Pop.	±%
1961	1,580	—
1966	2,436	+54.2%
1971	3,807	+56.3%
1976	5,602	+47.1%
1981	5,681	+1.4%
1986	5,769	+1.5%
1991	6,006	+4.1%
Source: Statistics Canada

Sherwood is a neighbourhood of the city of Charlottetown in central Queens County, Prince Edward Island, Canada.

Sherwood is centrally located in Charlottetown on the border of Queens Royalty and the township of Lot 33.

Originally the settlement was known as Sherwood Station, as it was located on the mainline of the Prince Edward Island Railway running from Charlottetown to Royalty Junction (where the line bifurcated east to Mount Stewart and west to Emerald. Sherwood Station was incorporated as a village in 1960 and its name was shortened to Sherwood in 1983. The village was amalgamated into the city of Charlottetown on April 1, 1995.

Sherwood was largely a farming district, located east of the royalty's common pasture land (present-day Agriculture Canada experimental farm). It bordered Charlottetown and West Royalty on the west, Parkdale on the south, and East Royalty on the east.

One of the biggest changes that came to Sherwood occurred in 1938 when a 300-acre (1.2 km^{2}) parcel on the northern edge of the community was purchased by the city of Charlottetown to create an airport. The Charlottetown Airport remains a defining landmark in the north-central part of the city and has had a major influence on Sherwood's post-war development. During the 1960s-1990s, much of the remaining farmland in Sherwood was developed in housing projects which resulted in many single-detached homes constructed throughout the area, making Sherwood one of PEI's top-five communities in terms of population.

Sherwood is home to the Sherwood Falcons of the Island Junior Hockey League, as well as the Sherwood Metros of the Prince Edward Island Junior C Hockey League.

Presently a neighbourhood, Sherwood has a mix of housing, commercial and light industrial districts.
