= Charlottetown =

Capital city of Prince Edward Island, Canada

- City and provincial capital
- City of Charlottetown
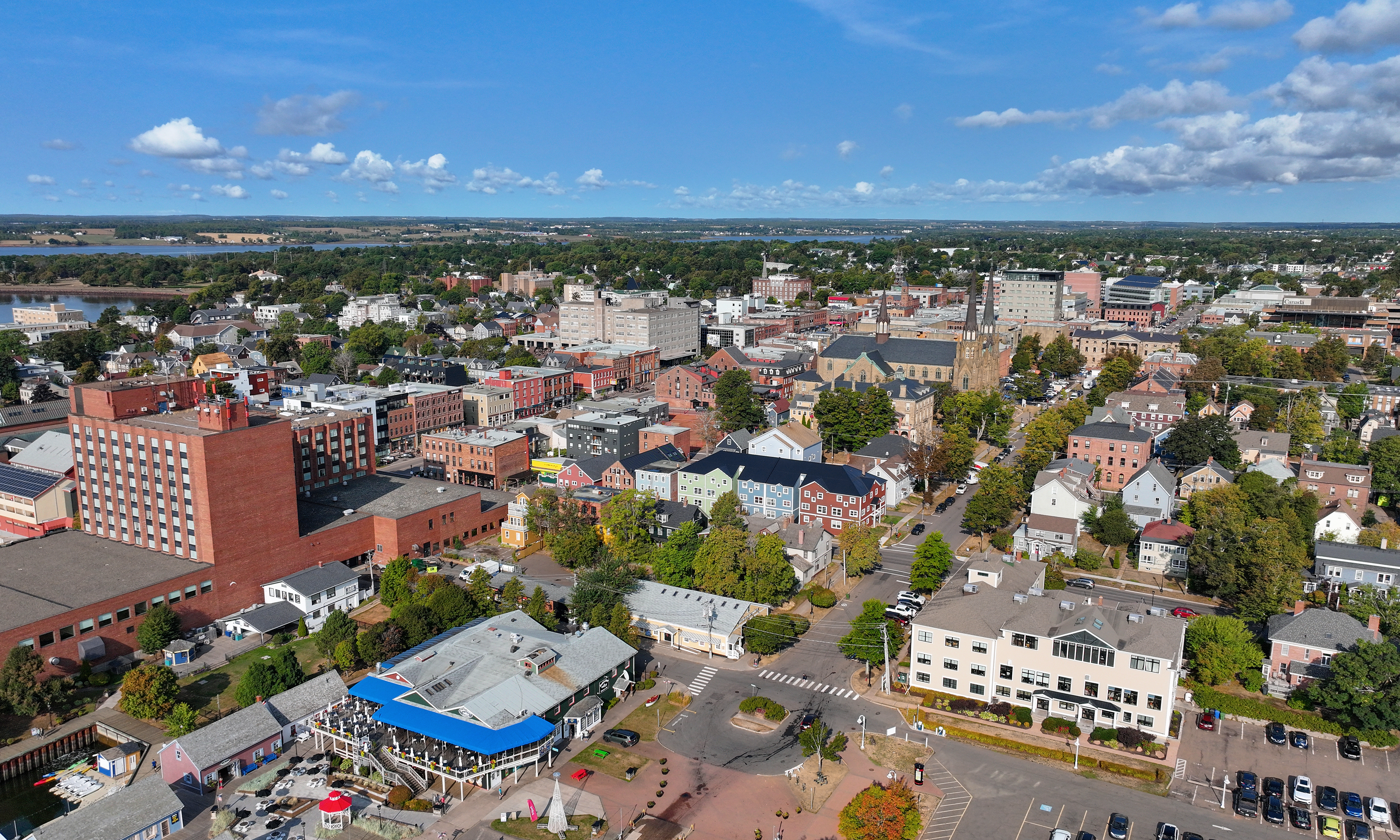
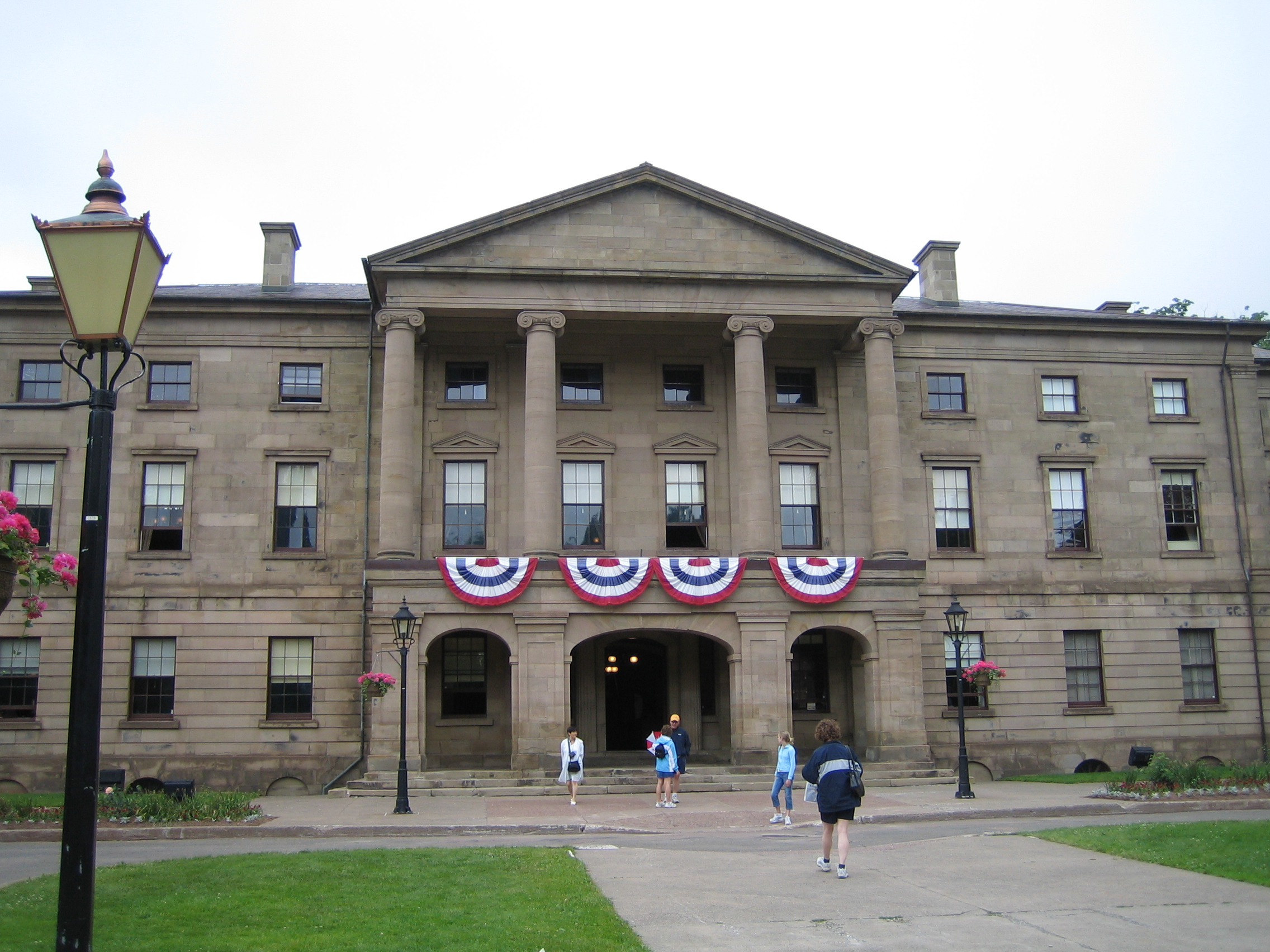
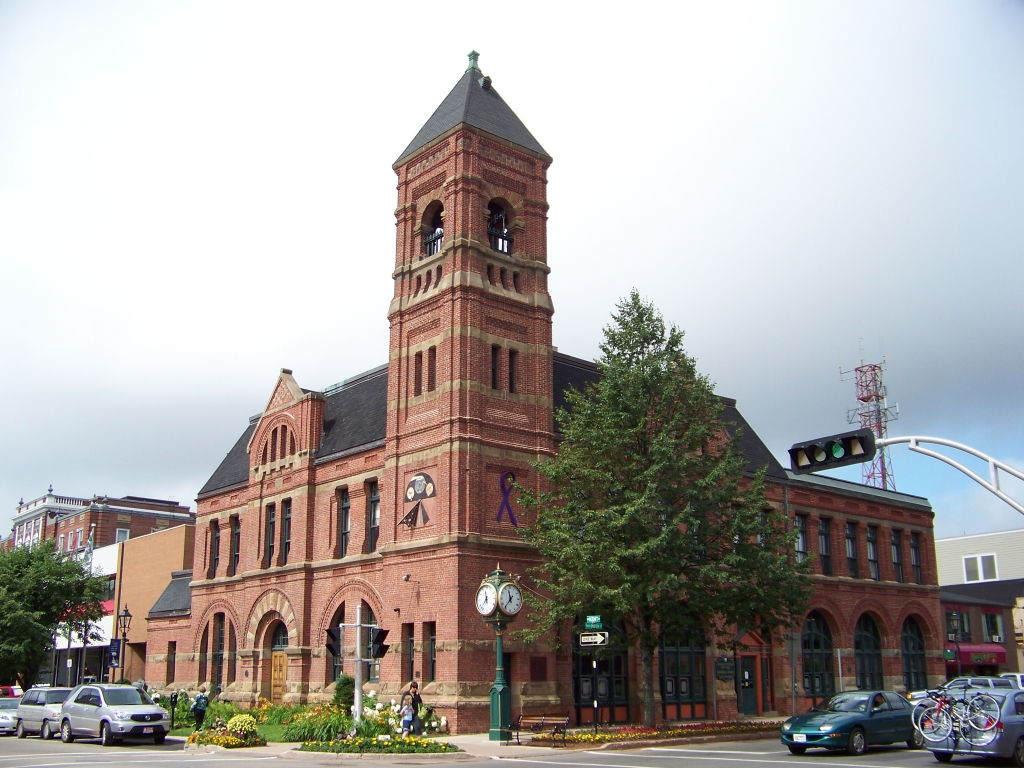
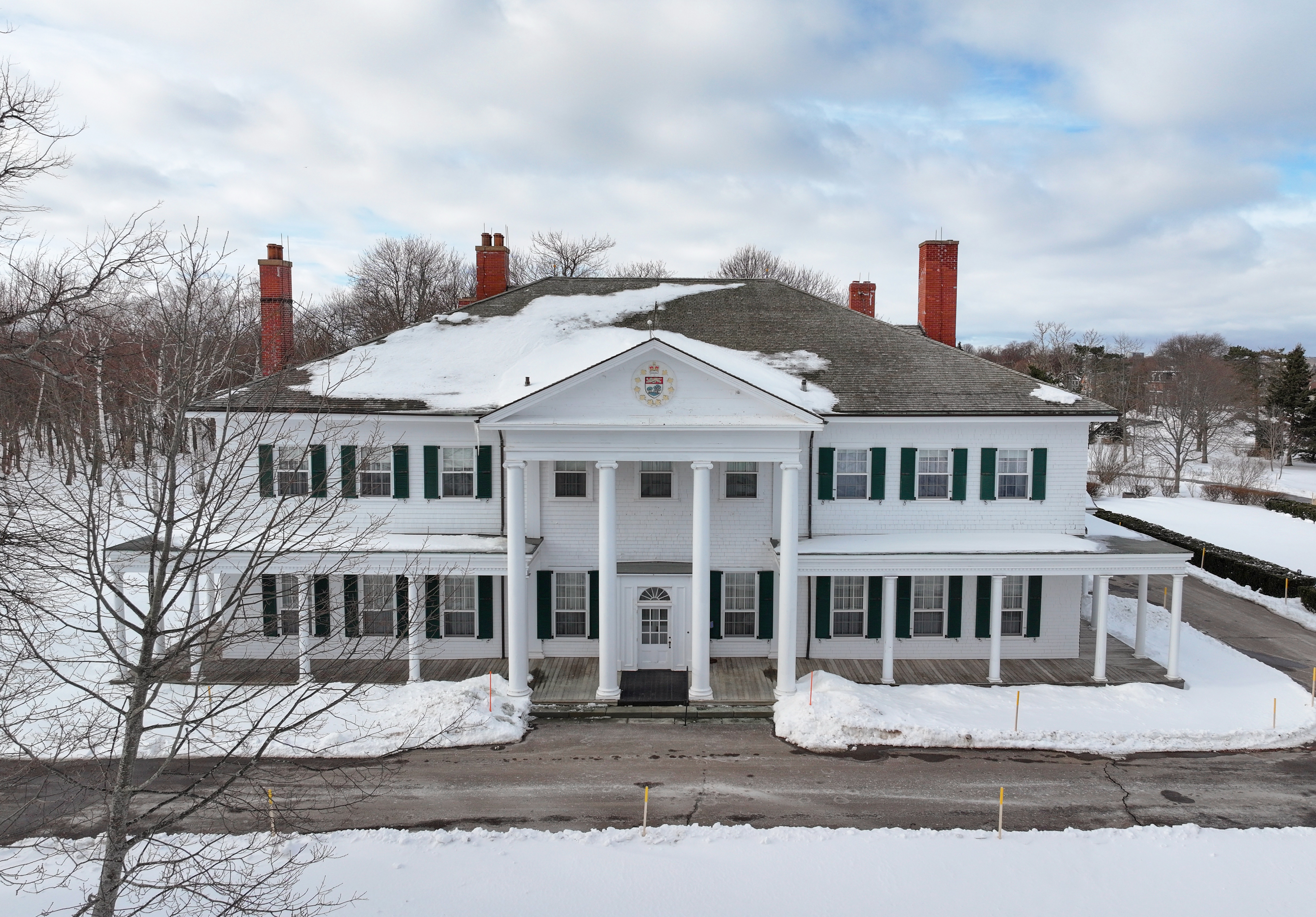
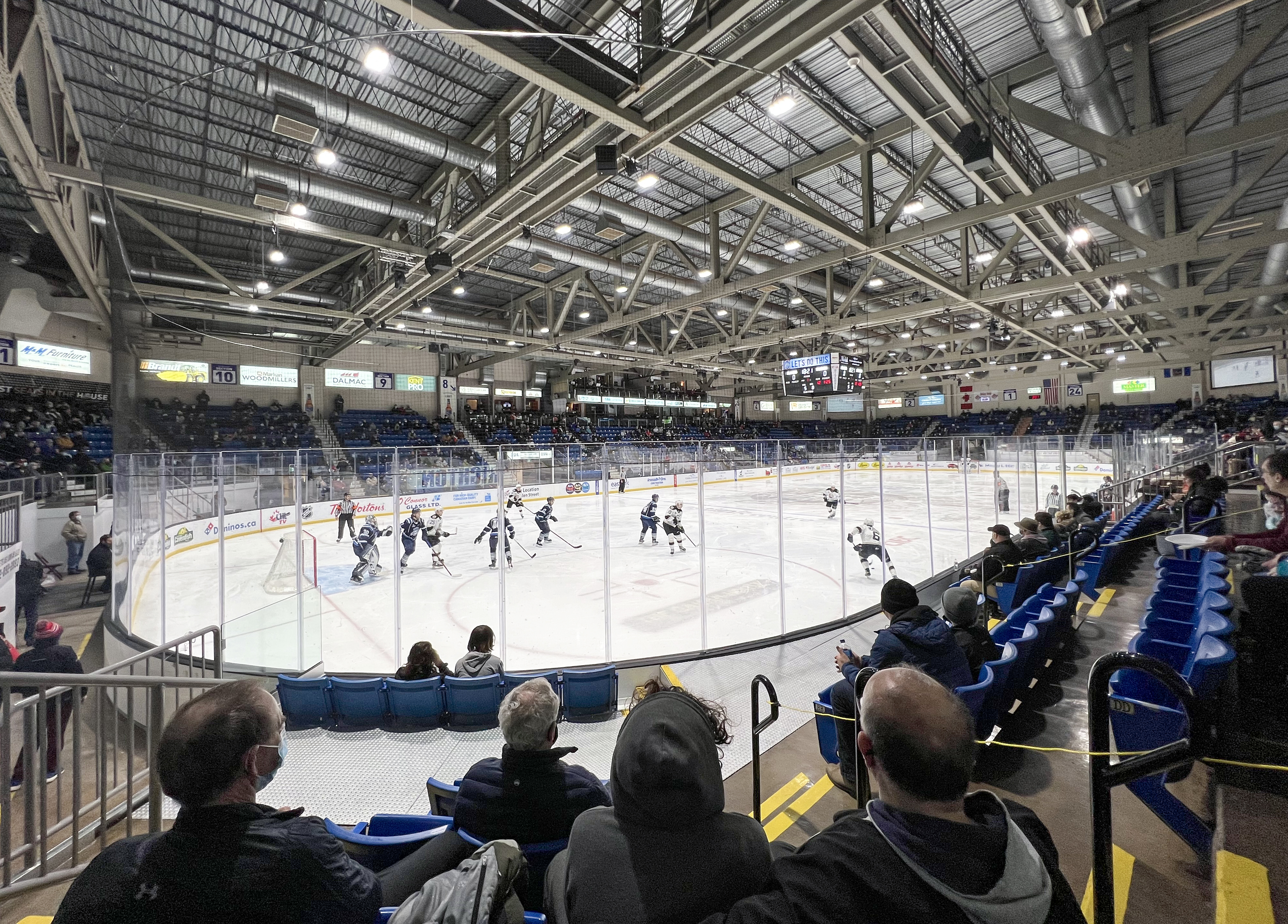
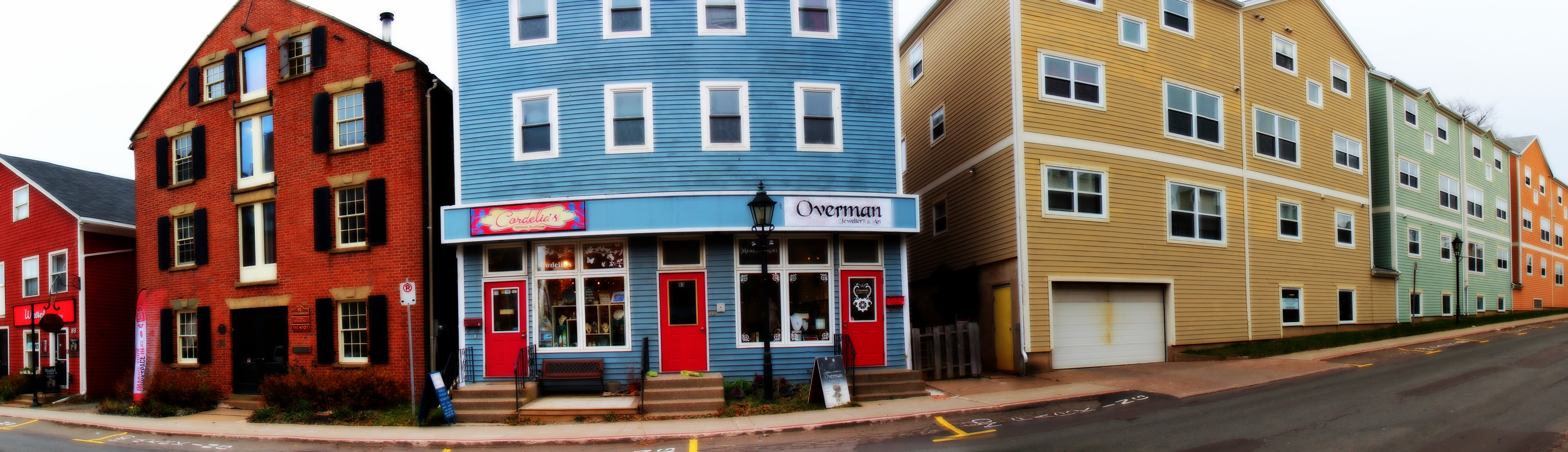
- Aerial view of Charlottetown Province House City Hall Fanningbank Eastlink Centre Queen's Square

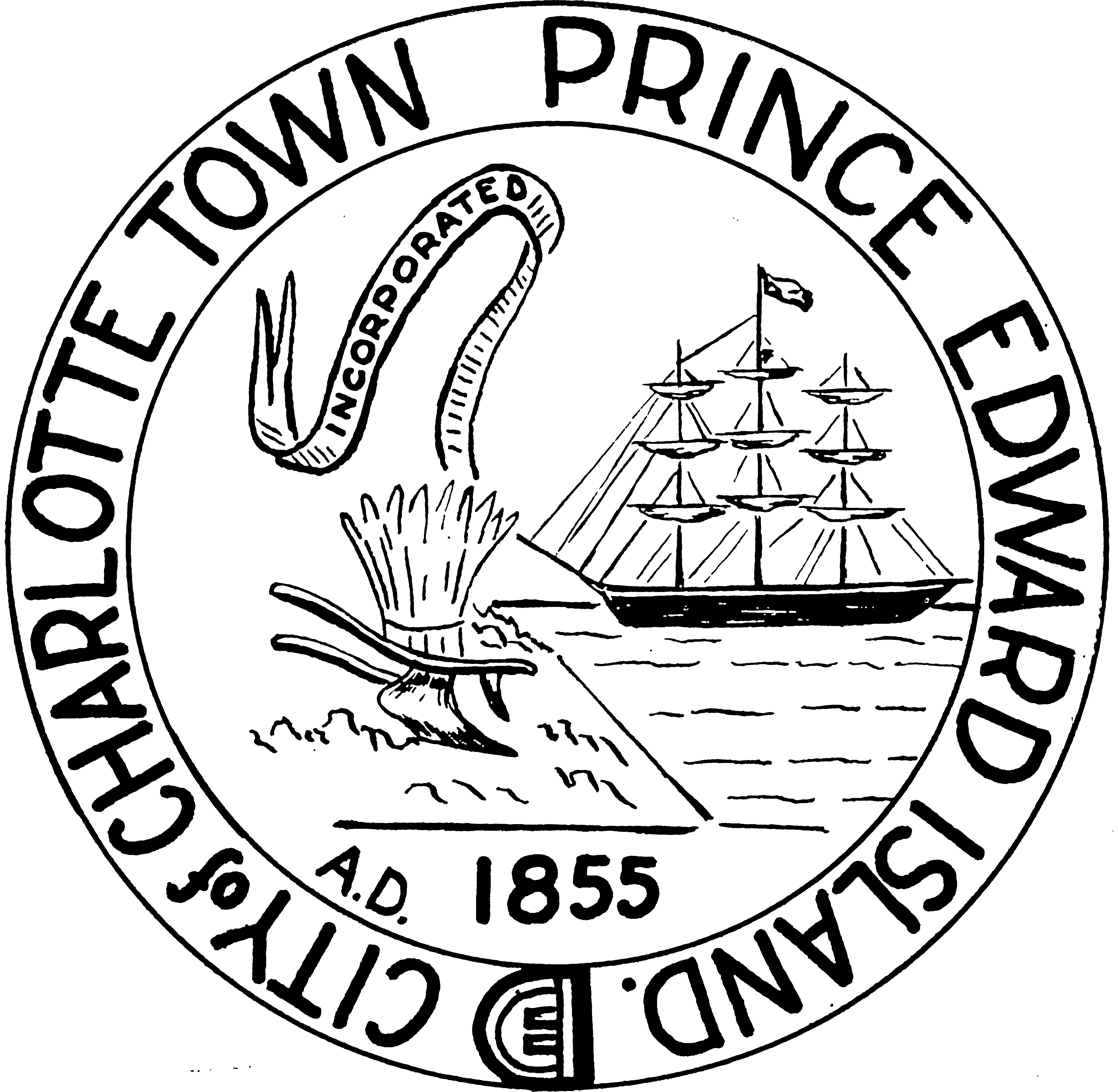
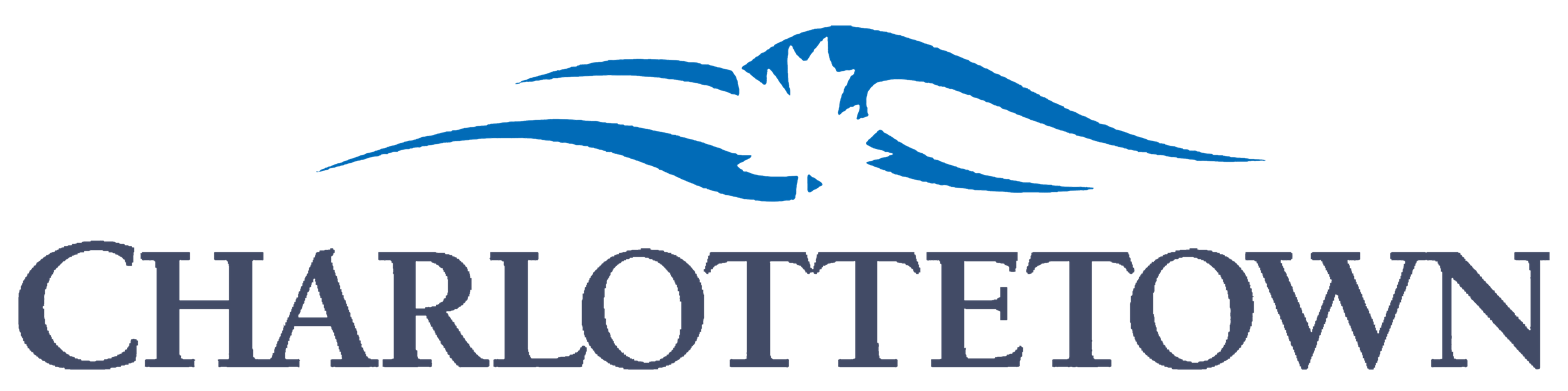
- Flag Seal Coat of arms Logo
- Nicknames: "Birthplace of Confederation"
- Motto: "Cunabula Foederis" (Latin) "Birthplace of Confederation"
- Location within Prince Edward Island Location in Canada
- Coordinates: 46°14′7″N 63°7′36″W
- Country: Canada
- Province: Prince Edward Island
- County: Queens
- Founded: 1764
- City: April 17, 1855
- Named for: Charlotte of Mecklenburg-Strelitz

Government
  - Mayor: Philip Brown
  - Governing body: Charlottetown City Council

Area (2021)
  - City: 44.27 km^{2} (17.09 sq mi)
  - Urban: 57.56 km^{2} (22.22 sq mi)
  - Metro: 1,112.43 km^{2} (429.51 sq mi)
- Elevation: 0 to 49 m (0 to 161 ft)

Population (2021)
  - City: 38,809
  - Density: 876.6/km^{2} (2,270/sq mi)
  - Urban: 52,390
  - Urban density: 910.2/km^{2} (2,357/sq mi)
  - Metro: 78,858
  - Metro density: 70.9/km^{2} (184/sq mi)
  - Change (2016–21): ▲7.5%
  - Estimate (2022): 40,500
- Demonym(s): Charlottetonian, Townie, From Town
- Time zone: UTC−04:00 (AST)
  - Summer (DST): UTC−03:00 (ADT)
- Postal code: C1A — E
- Area codes: 902 and 782
- NTS Map: 011L03
- GNBC Code: BAARG
- Website: charlottetown.ca

Charlottetown is the capital and largest city of the Canadian province of Prince Edward Island, and the county seat of Queens County. Named after Queen Charlotte, Charlottetown was an unincorporated town until it was incorporated as a city in 1855.

It was the site of the famous Charlottetown Conference in 1864, the first gathering of Canadian and Maritime statesmen to discuss the proposed Maritime Union. This conference led, instead, to the union of British North American colonies in 1867, which was the beginning of the Canadian Confederation. Prince Edward Island, however, did not join Confederation until 1873. From this, the city adopted as its motto Cunabula Foederis, "Birthplace of Confederation".

The population of Charlottetown is estimated to be 40,500 (2022); this forms the centre of a census agglomeration of 83,063 (2021), which is roughly half of the province's population (160,302).

== History ==
=== Early history (1720–1900) ===
The first European settlers in the area were French; personnel from Fortress Louisbourg founded a settlement in 1720 named Port La Joye on the southwestern part of the harbour opposite the present-day city. This settlement was led by Michel Haché-Gallant, who used his sloop to ferry Acadian settlers from Louisbourg.

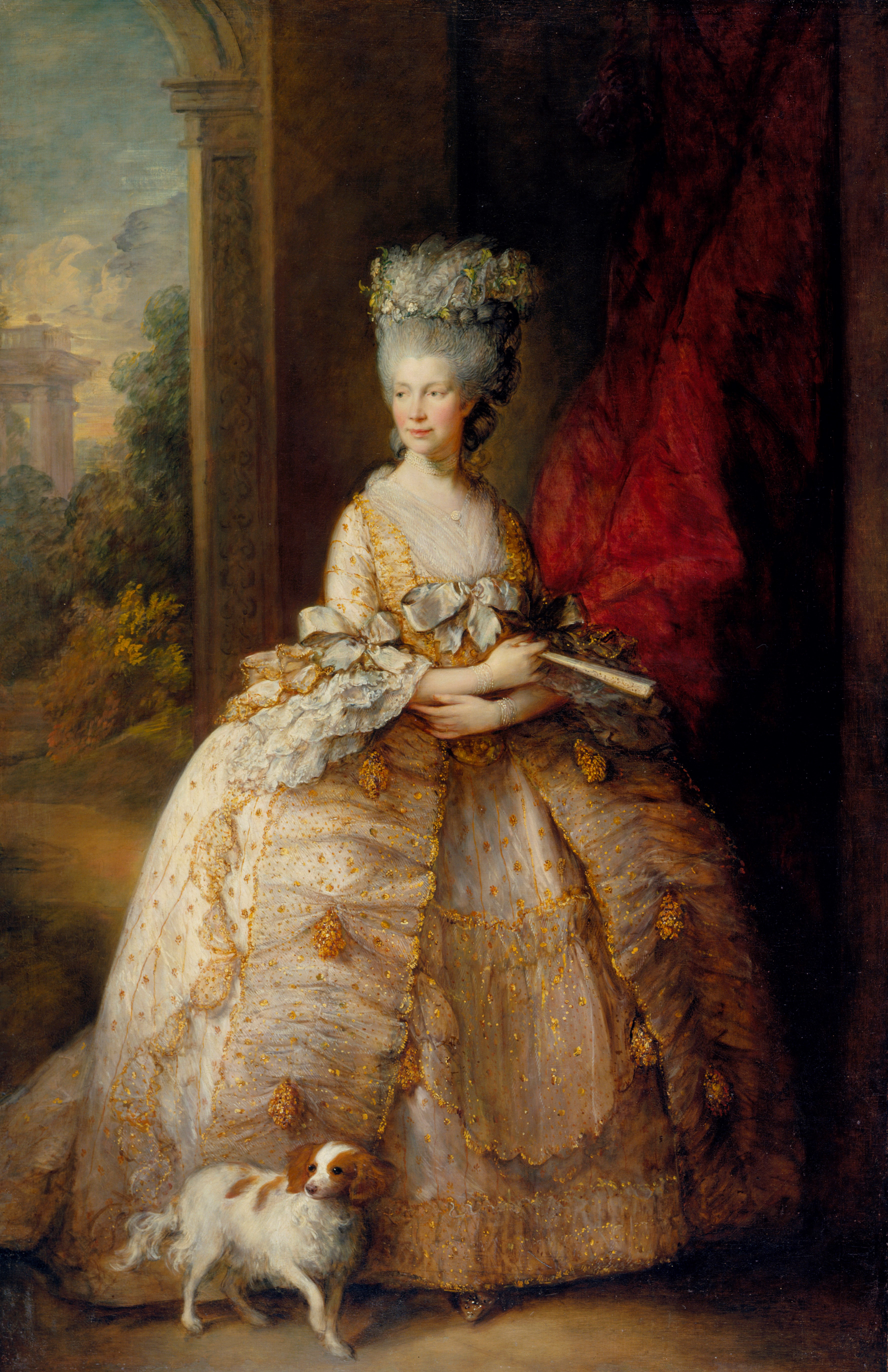
Charlottetown was named for Queen Charlotte.

During King George's War, the British had taken over Prince Edward Island. French officer Jean-Baptiste Nicolas Roch de Ramezay attacked with 500 men at the Battle at Port-la-Joye, resulting in a British defeat and the capture or death of all involved British troops.

In August 1758, at the height of the French and Indian War, a British fleet took control of the settlement and the rest of the island, promptly deporting those French settlers that they could find in the Ile Saint-Jean Campaign (this being fully three years after the initial Acadian Expulsion in Nova Scotia). British forces built Fort Amherst near the site of the abandoned Port La Joye settlement to protect the entrance to the harbour.

Charlottetown was selected as the site for the county seat of Queens County in the colonial survey of 1764 by Captain Samuel Holland of the Royal Engineers. A year later, Charlottetown was made the colonial capital of St. John's Island. Further surveys conducted between 1768 and 1771 established the street grid and public squares which can be seen in the city's historic district. The town was named in honour of Queen Charlotte.

On November 17, 1775, during the American Revolution, the colony's new capital was ransacked by Massachusetts-based privateers in the Raid on Charlottetown. During the attack, the colonial seal was stolen and several prisoners, including Phillips Callbeck and Thomas Wright, were taken to Cambridge, Massachusetts and later released.

In 1793, land had been set aside by Governor Fanning on the western limits of the community for use by the "Administrator of Government" (the governor), and as such it became known informally as "Fanning's Bank" or just "Fanning Bank". On November 29, 1798, St. John's Island was renamed to Prince Edward Island in honour of Prince Edward, Duke of Kent and Strathearn, who was the Commander-in-Chief, North America.

In 1805, the local British garrison constructed a harbour defence called "Fort Edward" to the west of the capital's waterfront and the "Prince Edward Battery" manned this facility. In 1835, "Government House" was constructed at Fanning Bank as a residence for the colony's Governor. Today, it serves as the official residence for the Lieutenant Governor.

Between 1843 and 1847, a new legislative building was constructed in the community. Named the Colonial Building originally, following Confederation with Canada it gradually became known as "Province House". The completion of this structure with Isaac Smith as builder/architect was an important milestone in the history of the capital and it is still in use today as the provincial legislature as well as a National Historic Site, and is currently the second-oldest legislative seat in Canada.

On April 17, 1855, Charlottetown was incorporated as a city, holding its first council meeting on August 11 of that year. The community had 6,500 residents at the time of incorporation.

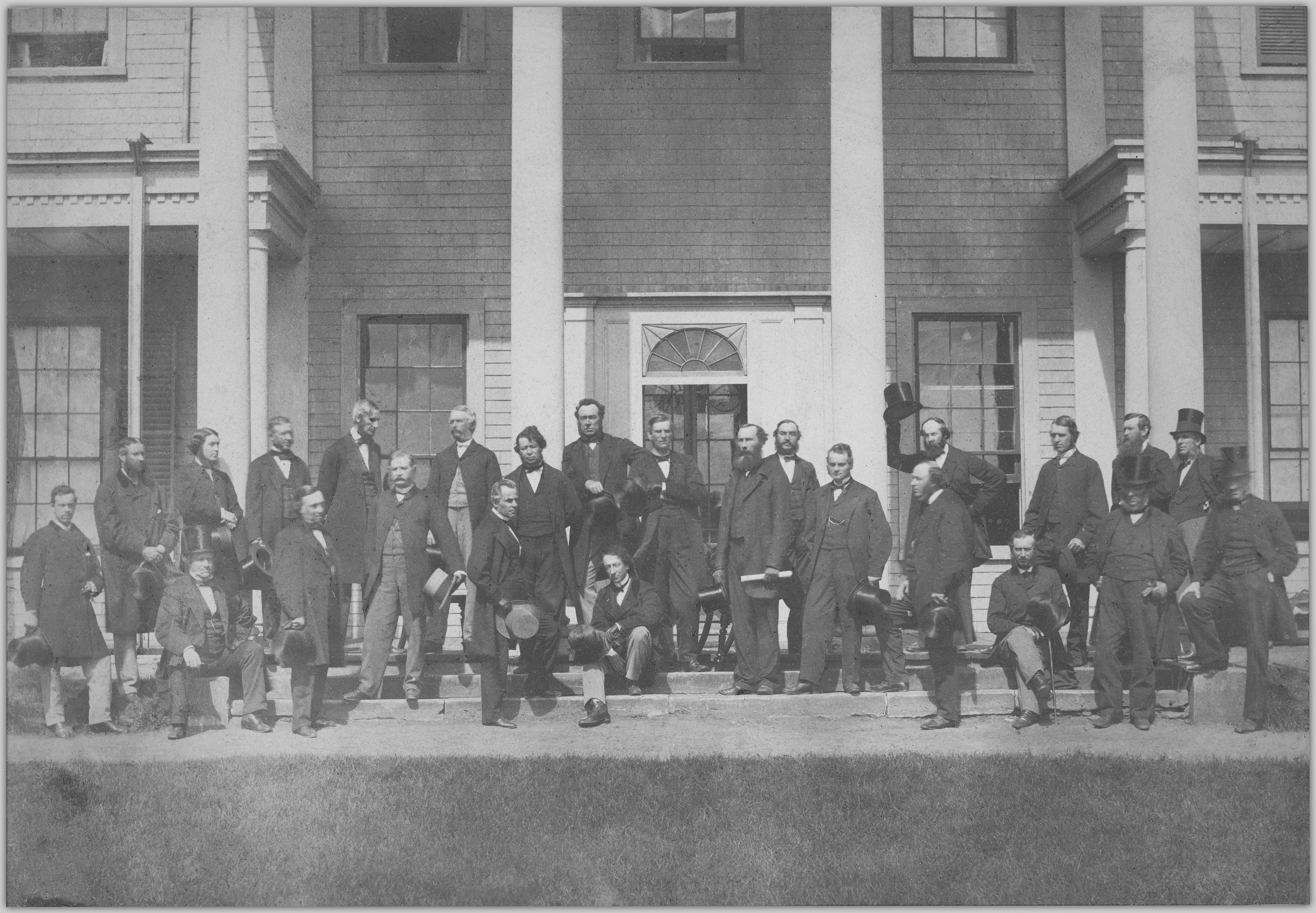
Members of the Charlottetown Conference, a conference to discuss Canadian Confederation, in front of Government House in 1864.

Between September 1–8, 1864, Charlottetown hosted what is now termed the Charlottetown Conference. Although many of the meetings and negotiations which would lead to Canadian Confederation were held in Province House, various social events spilled over into the surrounding community.

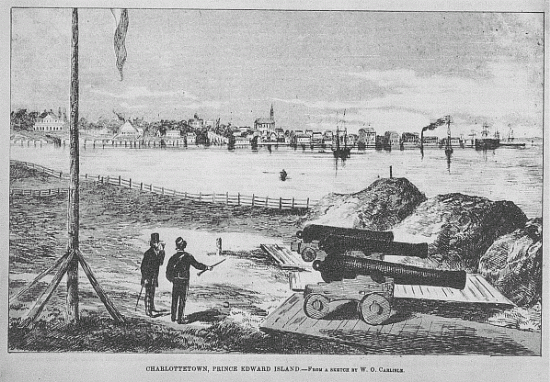
View of Charlottetown in 1872, one year prior to Prince Edward Island's entry into Canadian Confederation.

Prince Edward Island entered Confederation on July 1, 1873. Aside from being the seat of colonial government, the community came to be noted during the early nineteenth century for shipbuilding and its lumber industry as well as being a fishing port. The shipbuilding industry declined in the latter part of the nineteenth century.

On June 14, 1873, the "Government House Farm" at Fanning Bank was designated a municipal park, named Victoria Park in honour of Queen Victoria. In August 1874, the Prince Edward Island Railway opened its main line between Charlottetown and Summerside. The railway, along with the shipping industry, would continue to drive industrial development on the waterfront for several decades to come. The province's first health care facility, the Charlottetown Hospital, was opened by the Diocese of Charlottetown in 1879, which was followed by the publicly operated Prince Edward Island Hospital in 1884.

=== Modern history (1900–present) ===
Religion played a central role in the development of Charlottetown's institutions with non-denominational (i.e. Protestant) and Roman Catholic public schools (Catholic Queen Square, Notre Dame, and St Joseph's vs. Protestant West Kent and Prince Street), hospitals (Prince Edward Island Hospital vs. Charlottetown Hospital), and post-secondary institutions (Prince of Wales College vs. St. Dunstan's University) being instituted. St. Dunstan's was originally developed as a seminary for training priests, and the Maritime Christian College was founded in 1960 to train preachers for the Christian churches and churches of Christ in Prince Edward Island and the Maritime Provinces.

As with most communities in North America, the automobile shaped Charlottetown's development in the latter half of the twentieth century, when outlying farms in rural areas of Brighton, Spring Park, and Parkdale saw increased housing developments. The Charlottetown airfield in the nearby rural community of Sherwood was upgraded as part of the British Commonwealth Air Training Plan and operated for the duration of World War II as RCAF Station Charlottetown, in conjunction with RCAF Station Mount Pleasant and RCAF Station Summerside. After the war the airfield was designated Charlottetown Airport. Charlottetown's shipyards were used extensively during World War II, being used for refits and upgrades to numerous Royal Canadian Navy warships. Further post-war development continued to expand residential properties in adjacent outlying areas, particularly in the neighbouring farming communities of Sherwood, West Royalty, and East Royalty.

In 1959, the suburban village of Spring Park was amalgamated into the city, extending the city's northern boundary from Kirkwood Drive to Hermitage Creek and included the campus of St. Dunstan's University.

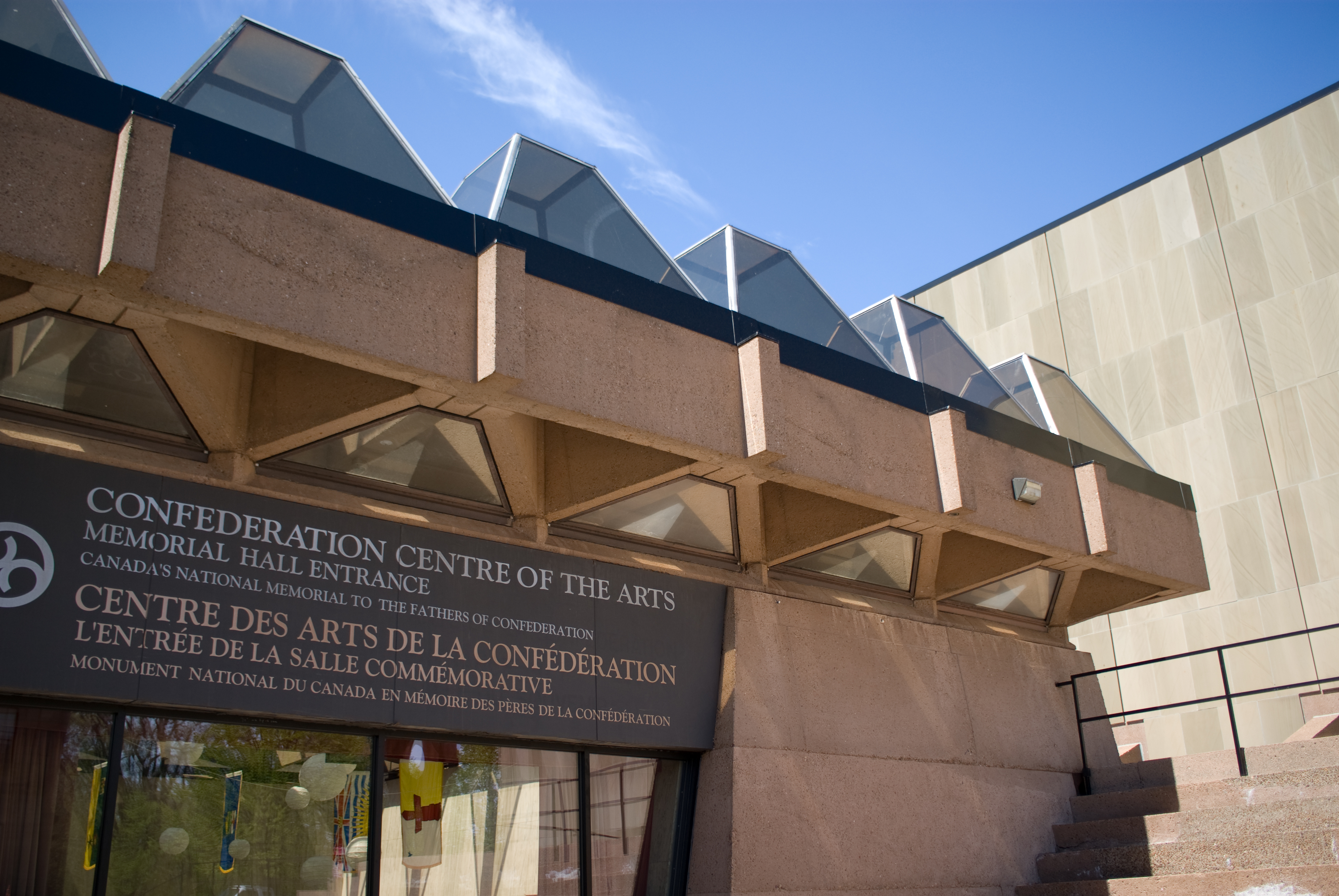
Entrance for the Confederation Centre of the Arts. The Centre was opened in 1964, to commemorate the centennial of the Charlottetown Conference.

To commemorate the centennial of the Charlottetown Conference, the ten provincial governments and the Government of Canada contributed to a national monument to the "Fathers of Confederation". The Confederation Centre of the Arts, which opened in 1964, is a gift to the residents of Prince Edward Island, and contains a public library, nationally renowned art gallery, and a mainstage theatre which has played to the Charlottetown Festival every summer since.

In the 1960s, new public schools were constructed in the community, and in 1969 the city became home to the amalgamated University of Prince Edward Island (UPEI), located on the campus of the former St. Dunstan's University. Together with the federal Department of Agriculture and Agri-Food's Charlottetown Experimental Farm (also known as Ravenwood Farm), these properties are a large green space surrounded by the city. The Prince of Wales College downtown campus became part of a new provincial community college system named Holland College, in honour of the island's famous surveyor. The PEI Comprehensive Development Plan in the late 1960s greatly contributed to the expansion of the provincial government in Charlottetown for the next decade.

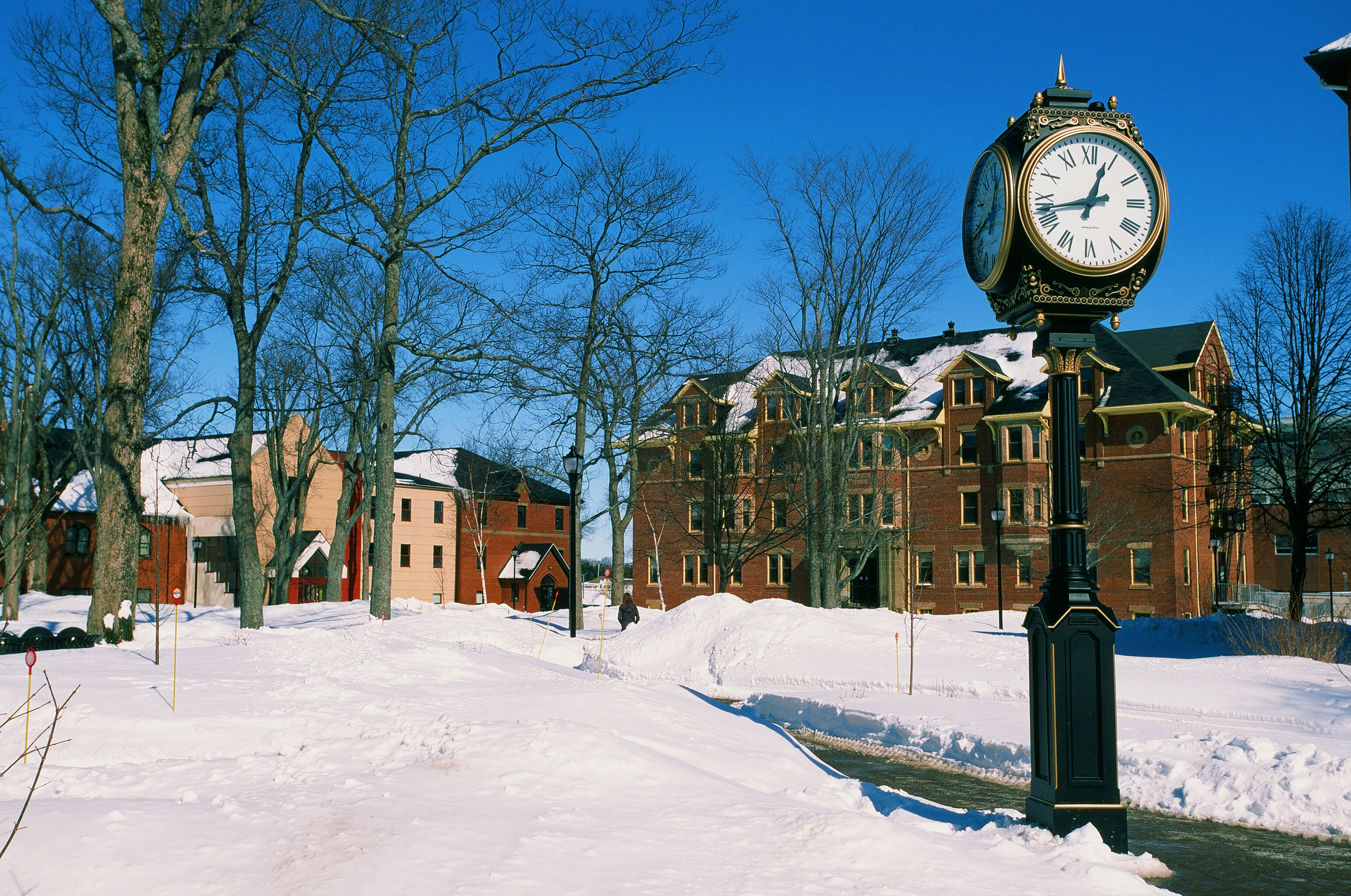
Campus of the University of Prince Edward Island. In 1969, two local post-secondary institutions, Saint Dunstan's University and Prince of Wales College, amalgamated to form UPEI.

The Queen Elizabeth Hospital opened in 1982. In 1983, the national headquarters of the federal Department of Veterans Affairs was moved to Charlottetown as part of a nationwide federal government decentralization programme. In 1986, UPEI expanded further with the opening of the Atlantic Veterinary College.

Throughout the 1970s and 1980s, there was increased commercial office and retail development. A waterfront hotel and convention centre was completed in 1982 and helped to encourage diversification and renewal in the area, leading to several residential complexes and downtown shopping facilities. The abandonment of rail service in the province by CN Rail in December 1989 led to the railway and industrial lands at the east end of the waterfront being transformed into parks and cultural attractions.

In the late 1990s and 2000s, the retail landscape changed with the opening of big box stores on the site of former traditional shopping centres and in new developments in the northern suburbs, particularly the neighbourhood of West Royalty, which is a key road junction.

On April 1, 1995, Charlottetown amalgamated with the Town of Parkdale and the incorporated communities of East Royalty, Hillsborough Park, Sherwood, West Royalty, and Winsloe. At the same time, the amalgamated Charlottetown annexed Queens Royalty. Today, the City of Charlottetown occupies parts of the Lot 33 and Lot 34 townships.

The central business district continues to undergo incremental expansion as government and private sector office space is constructed and new institutional space is built or retrofitted, however retail space in the CBD has suffered as a result of outlying big box retail construction in recent years.

On May 31, 2021, the Charlottetown City Council voted to remove a statue of John A. MacDonald, the first Prime Minister of Canada, following a year of vandalism in the wake of the George Floyd Protests. The catalyst for the removal came following the discovery of a mass grave at the Kamloops Indian Residential School in British Columbia.

The first video and sound recording of a meteorite striking the earth, the Charlottetown meteorite, was captured in the neighborhood of Marshfield in 2024.

== Geography ==
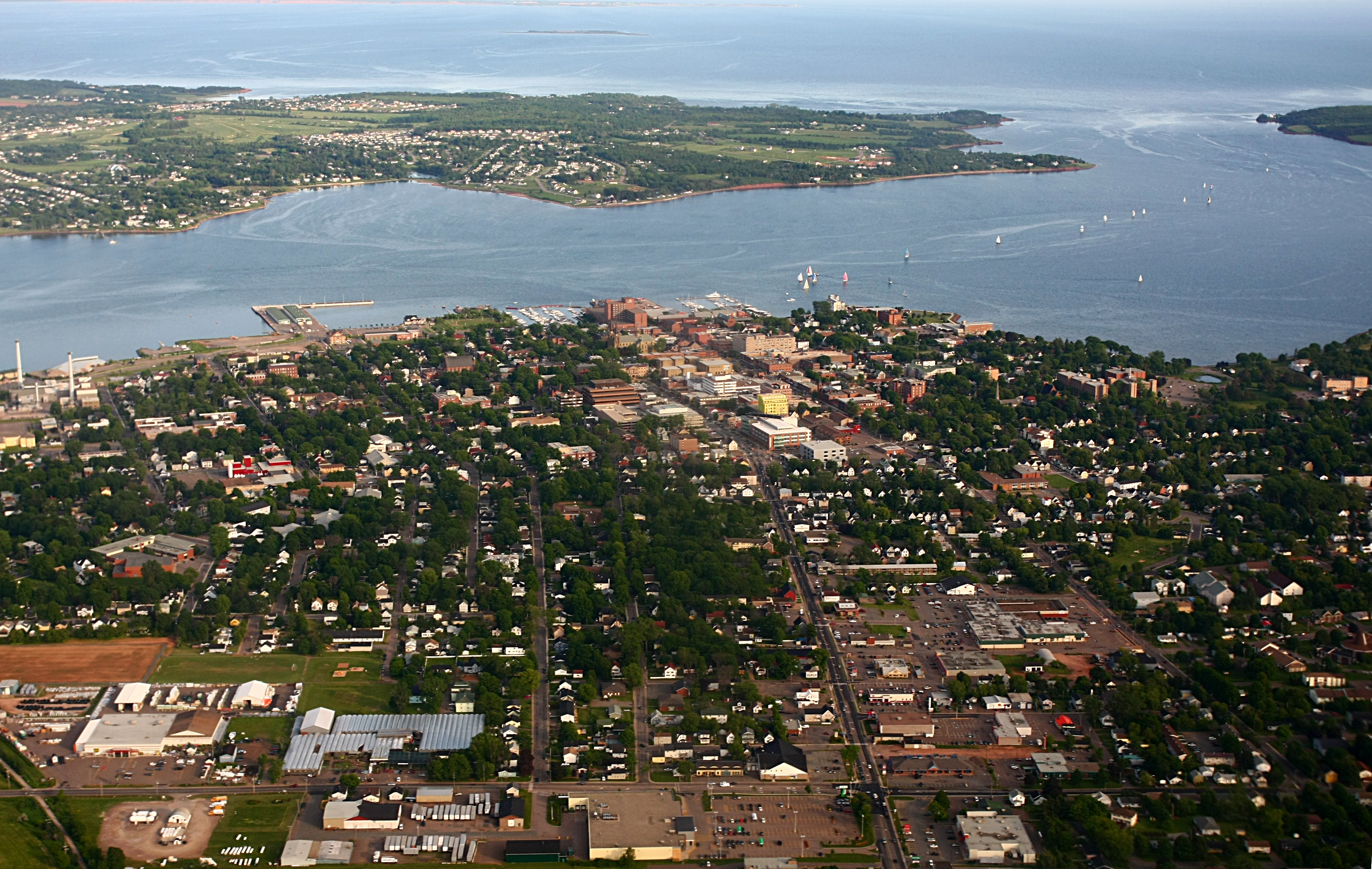
Charlottetown is situated on its namesake harbour. The harbour leads into the Northumberland Strait.

Charlottetown is situated on its namesake harbour, which is formed by the confluence of three rivers in the central part of the island's south shore. The harbour opens onto the Northumberland Strait. The city is roughly V-shaped (pointed to the south) and constrained by the North (Yorke) and the Hillsborough (East) Rivers to the west and east.

=== Climate ===
Charlottetown has a humid continental climate (Köppen Dfb) moderated partially by Prince Edward Island's location in the Gulf of Saint Lawrence. Winters are somewhat milder than many inland cities at a similar latitude: the January average is −7.3 °C (18.9 °F), and lows reach −20 °C (−4 °F) or below on an average 5.8 days per season. However, the coastal position means that winter precipitation, more often as snow, is frequent and at times heavy: the seasonal snow average is 284.8 cm (112 in). Spring warming is gradual due to the ocean waters still being cold. Summers are mild, again due to the same maritime moderation: the July high is 23.6 °C (74.5 °F). Precipitation averages 1,135.7 mm (45 in) per year, with the greatest amounts falling in late fall and winter.

The highest temperature ever recorded in Charlottetown was 36.7 °C (98 °F) on August 19, 1935. The coldest temperature ever recorded was −32.8 °C (−27 °F) on January 29, 1877.

Climate data for Charlottetown (Charlottetown Airport), WMO ID: 71706; coordinates 46°17′19″N 63°07′43″W; elevation: 48.8 m (160 ft); 1991–2020 normals, extremes 1872–present (Note: Extreme high and low temperatures in the table are from Charlottetown (April 1872 to December 1934), Charlottetown CDA (January 1935 to March 1943), and Charlottetown Airport (April 1943 to present).)
Month	Jan	Feb	Mar	Apr	May	Jun	Jul	Aug	Sep	Oct	Nov	Dec	Year
Record high humidex	16.8	14.0	26.1	25.9	34.4	39.7	40.6	41.0	39.8	32.8	26.4	19.2	41.0
Record high °C (°F)	15.1 (59.2)	13.3 (55.9)	24.5 (76.1)	26.7 (80.1)	31.7 (89.1)	32.2 (90.0)	33.9 (93.0)	36.7 (98.1)	31.5 (88.7)	27.8 (82.0)	21.3 (70.3)	16.7 (62.1)	36.7 (98.1)
Mean maximum °C (°F)	8.5 (47.3)	6.9 (44.4)	10.4 (50.7)	17.9 (64.2)	24.3 (75.7)	27.5 (81.5)	29.1 (84.4)	28.9 (84.0)	26.0 (78.8)	20.9 (69.6)	16.8 (62.2)	11.4 (52.5)	30.1 (86.2)
Mean daily maximum °C (°F)	−3.0 (26.6)	−2.9 (26.8)	1.4 (34.5)	7.3 (45.1)	14.2 (57.6)	19.5 (67.1)	23.6 (74.5)	23.3 (73.9)	19.1 (66.4)	12.6 (54.7)	6.7 (44.1)	0.9 (33.6)	10.2 (50.4)
Daily mean °C (°F)	−7.3 (18.9)	−7.3 (18.9)	−2.6 (27.3)	3.0 (37.4)	9.1 (48.4)	14.6 (58.3)	19.0 (66.2)	18.8 (65.8)	14.6 (58.3)	8.6 (47.5)	3.2 (37.8)	−2.7 (27.1)	5.9 (42.6)
Mean daily minimum °C (°F)	−11.5 (11.3)	−11.6 (11.1)	−6.5 (20.3)	−1.4 (29.5)	3.9 (39.0)	9.6 (49.3)	14.4 (57.9)	14.1 (57.4)	10.0 (50.0)	4.6 (40.3)	−0.2 (31.6)	−6.3 (20.7)	1.6 (34.9)
Mean minimum °C (°F)	−21.6 (−6.9)	−21.7 (−7.1)	−16.6 (2.1)	−7.7 (18.1)	−2.3 (27.9)	2.0 (35.6)	8.2 (46.8)	7.6 (45.7)	2.5 (36.5)	−2.1 (28.2)	−8.2 (17.2)	−16.0 (3.2)	−23.3 (−9.9)
Record low °C (°F)	−32.8 (−27.0)	−30.6 (−23.1)	−27.2 (−17.0)	−16.1 (3.0)	−6.7 (19.9)	−1.3 (29.7)	2.8 (37.0)	2.0 (35.6)	−1.4 (29.5)	−6.7 (19.9)	−17.2 (1.0)	−28.1 (−18.6)	−32.8 (−27.0)
Record low wind chill	−50.2	−45.4	−36.0	−24.5	−11.1	−3.3	0.0	0.0	−1.9	−10.8	−24.1	−40.6	−50.2
Average precipitation mm (inches)	101.4 (3.99)	85.4 (3.36)	83.9 (3.30)	74.8 (2.94)	78.3 (3.08)	90.7 (3.57)	82.3 (3.24)	96.3 (3.79)	95.3 (3.75)	121.8 (4.80)	110.3 (4.34)	115.2 (4.54)	1,135.7 (44.71)
Average rainfall mm (inches)	35.4 (1.39)	29.8 (1.17)	45.2 (1.78)	50.1 (1.97)	76.1 (3.00)	90.7 (3.57)	82.3 (3.24)	96.3 (3.79)	95.3 (3.75)	120.2 (4.73)	91.9 (3.62)	58.3 (2.30)	871.6 (34.31)
Average snowfall cm (inches)	73.2 (28.8)	61.7 (24.3)	41.9 (16.5)	21.4 (8.4)	2.2 (0.9)	0.0 (0.0)	0.0 (0.0)	0.0 (0.0)	0.0 (0.0)	1.5 (0.6)	20.5 (8.1)	62.5 (24.6)	284.8 (112.1)
Average precipitation days (≥ 0.2 mm)	19.4	15.7	16.3	14.8	13.7	12.6	13.0	11.3	12.6	15.7	16.7	19.4	181.1
Average rainy days (≥ 0.2 mm)	5.9	4.9	7.9	10.9	13.5	12.6	13.0	11.3	12.6	15.4	13.0	9.0	129.7
Average snowy days (≥ 0.2 cm)	17.7	14.1	12.6	6.2	0.7	0.0	0.0	0.0	0.0	0.1	6.4	14.7	73.4
Average relative humidity (%) (at 15:00 LST)	73.9	70.1	67.7	63.9	62.3	64.8	64.7	63.7	65.4	68.5	73.0	76.3	67.9
Average dew point °C (°F)	−10.1 (13.8)	−10.4 (13.3)	−6.6 (20.1)	−1.5 (29.3)	4.3 (39.7)	10.1 (50.2)	14.6 (58.3)	14.4 (57.9)	10.9 (51.6)	5.3 (41.5)	0.0 (32.0)	−5.3 (22.5)	2.2 (36.0)
Mean monthly sunshine hours	108.9	109.1	141.3	148.2	197.1	219.8	253.6	219.0	181.0	123.9	62.9	75.8	1,840.5
Percentage possible sunshine	38.8	37.6	38.3	36.5	42.5	46.6	53.2	49.9	47.9	36.5	22.1	28.1	39.8
Source: Environment and Climate Change Canada, (sun 1971–2000), (weatherstats.ca - average record high / low and dewp0int)

== Cityscape ==
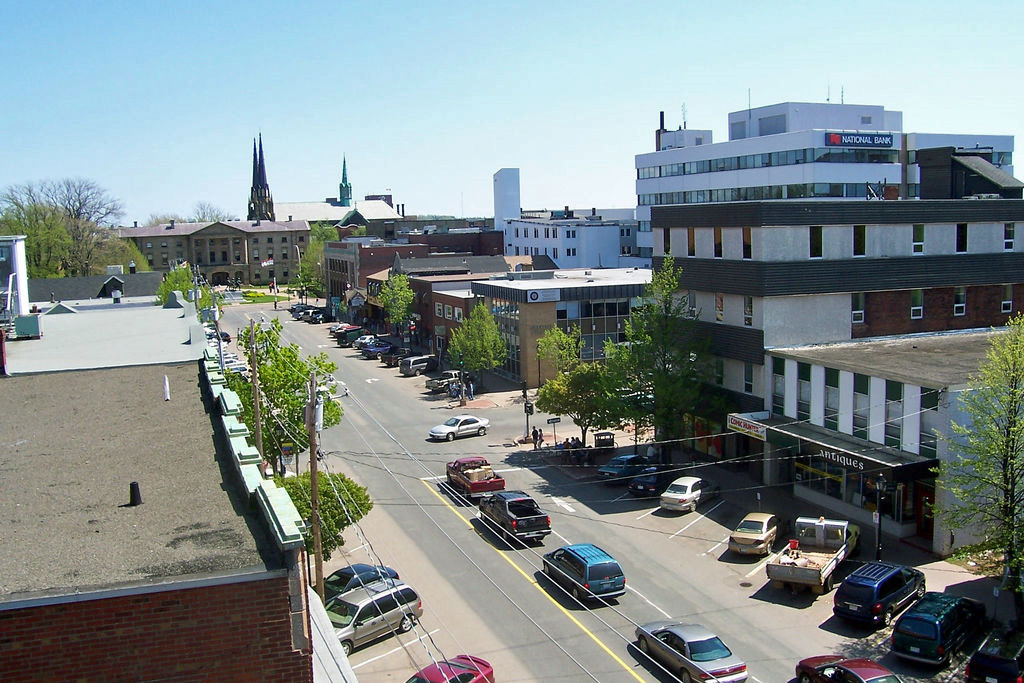
View of Downtown Charlottetown from atop the Atlantic Technology Centre.

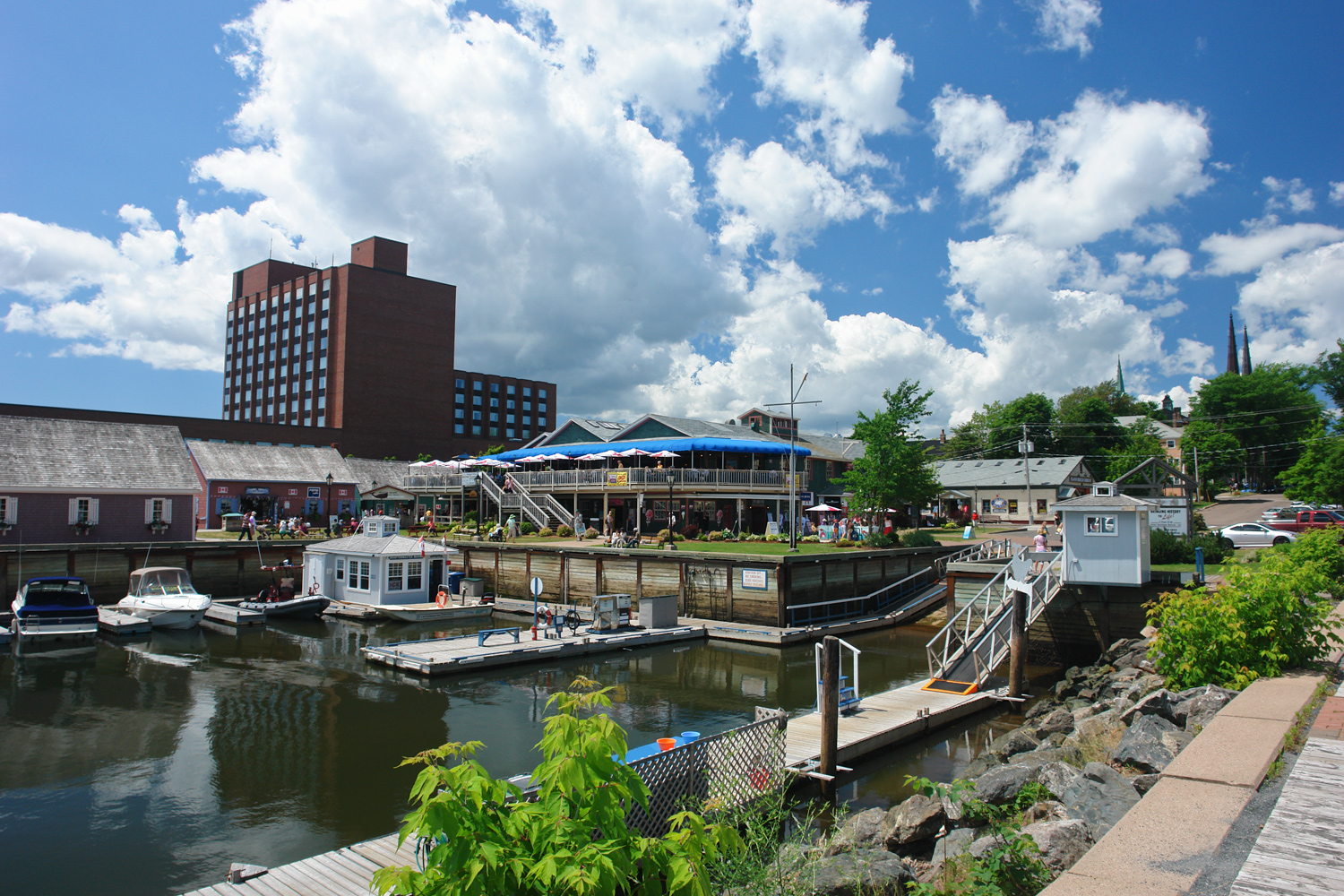
View from Charlottetown Marina. The city's waterfront is dominated by urban development.

Downtown Charlottetown includes the city's historic five hundred lots, as surveyed by Captain Samuel Holland, as well as the waterfront facing the harbour and the Hillsborough River. Adjacent communities to the original downtown included Brighton, Spring Park, Sherwood and Parkdale. The areas to the west, north and east of downtown have been developed in recent decades with several residential and commercial/retail developments, although the outer regions of the city are still predominantly farmland, as is an area in the centre of the city where an Agriculture Canada experimental crop research station is located. The Agriculture Canada research station farm is the last remnant of the Queens Royalty common pasture lands and creates a large greenspace in the centre of the city, north of downtown. The development of the township of Queens Royalty, with its 5-hectare (12-acre) estates surveyed during the 18th and 19th centuries along a north–south axis forced early road networks into a grid.

21st-century Charlottetown landscape is dominated by urban development along the waterfront areas, suburban development to the west, north and east, as well as the airport to the north. Commercial development, aside from the central business district, is concentrated along several road corridors:

- University Avenue/Malpeque Road
- North River Road/Lower Malpeque Road
- St. Peter's Road
- Mount Edward Road
- Kensington Road

The downtown core is augmented by several feeder streets:

- Queen Street
- Water Street
- Grafton Street

=== Neighbourhoods ===
Charlottetown has the following neighbourhoods which were one-time independent municipalities:

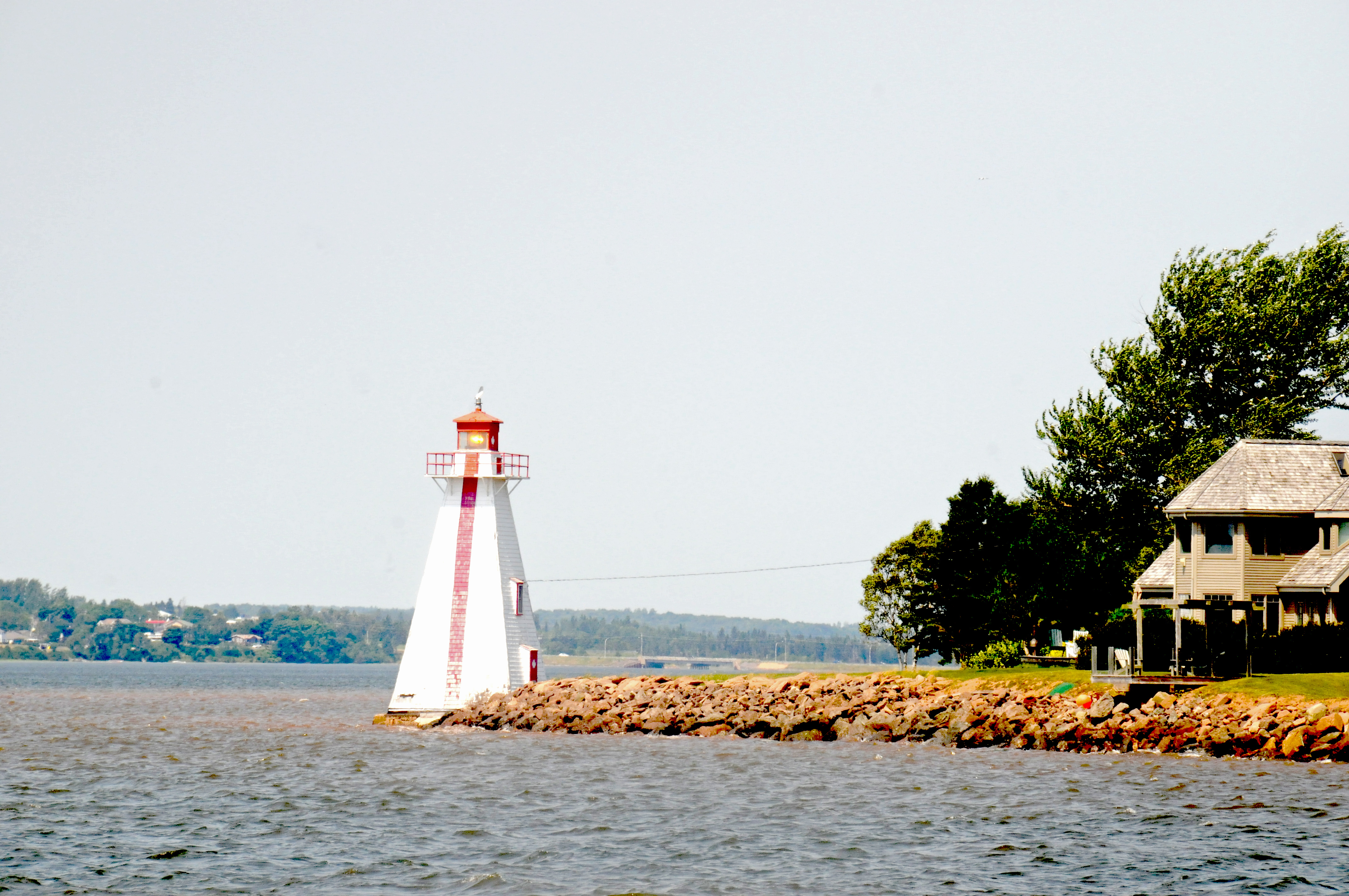
Brighton Beach Range Front lighthouse in the neighbourhood of Brighton.

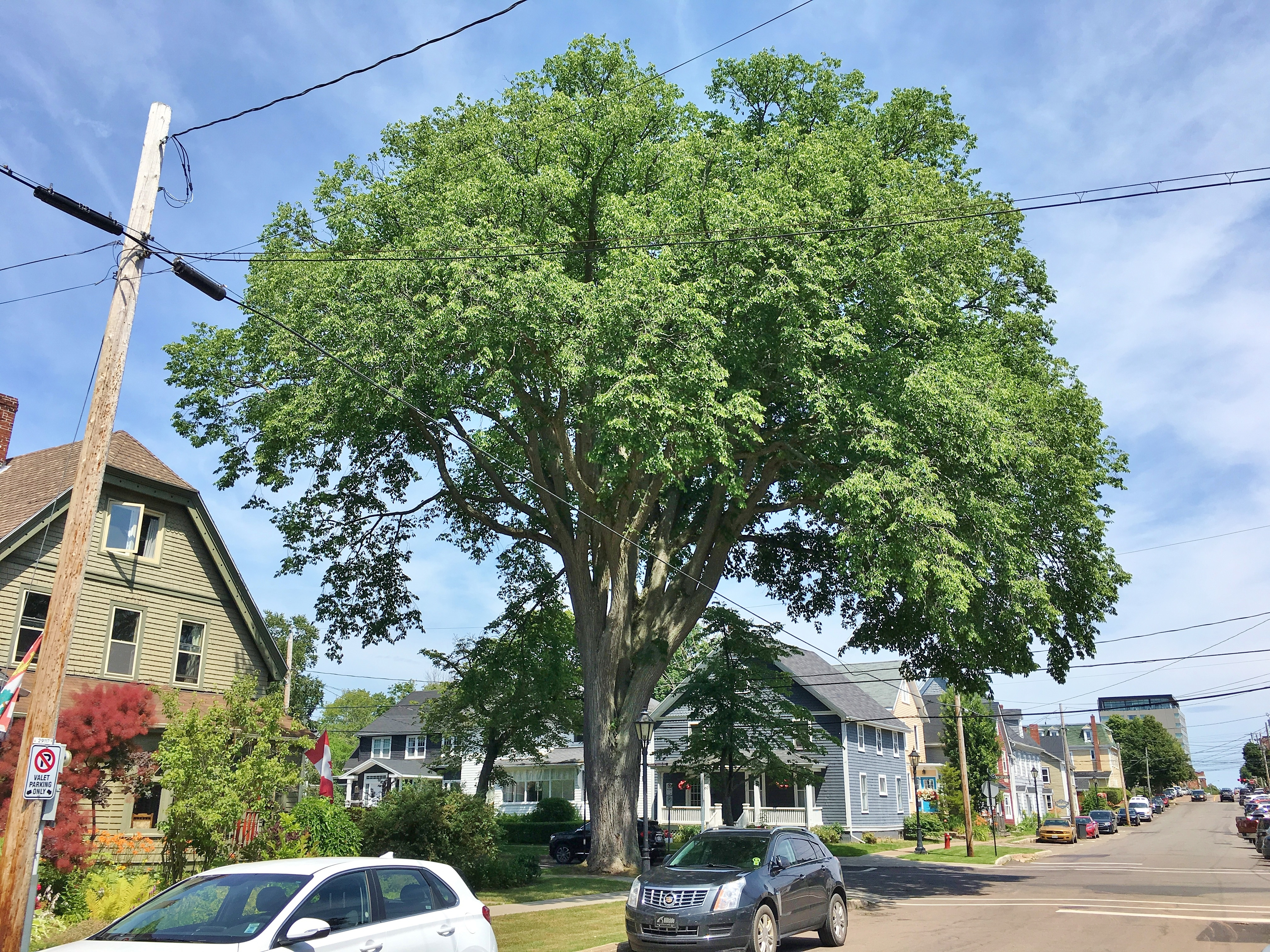
Large American elm in a Charlottetown neighbourhood near downtown (August 2019)

- Downtown Charlottetown
- Brighton
- Spring Park
- Parkdale
- Sherwood (including Falconwood)
- East Royalty (including Hillsborough Park)
- West Royalty (including Lewis Point)
- Winsloe

The original municipal boundary between Charlottetown and the common area of the township of Queens Royalty was the northern edge of the original five hundred lots along present-day Euston Street. This boundary was extended north to Allen Street and Kirkwood Drive during the early twentieth century, taking in part of the rural community of Brighton west of the downtown. The village of Spring Park was amalgamated into the city in 1959, extending the city's boundary north to Hermitage Creek, which also formed the southern boundary of the village of West Royalty. Development filled in most vacant land in the Brighton and Spring Park neighbourhoods by the 1980s. Municipal amalgamation in 1996 saw the outlying independent municipalities of Parkdale (town), Sherwood, East Royalty, West Royalty and Winsloe (villages) merged into a larger city of Charlottetown at the same time as rural communities east and west of the city were amalgamated to form the towns of Stratford and Cornwall respectively.

A green belt is in place around the northern fringe of the municipal boundary, although it is poorly enforced by the provincial government, leading to suburban sprawl.

== Culture ==
=== Attractions ===
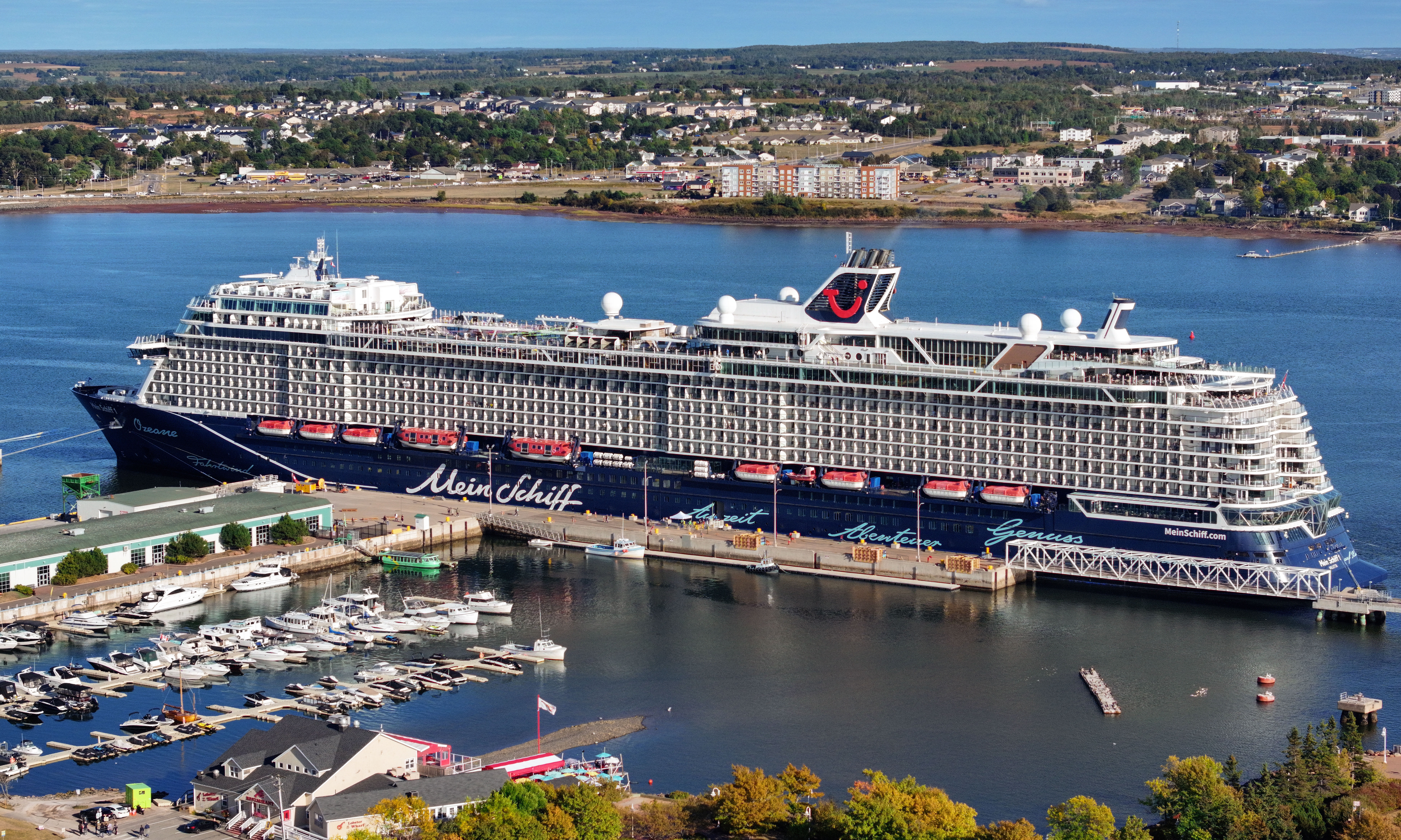
Mein Schiff 1 docked at Port Charlotte

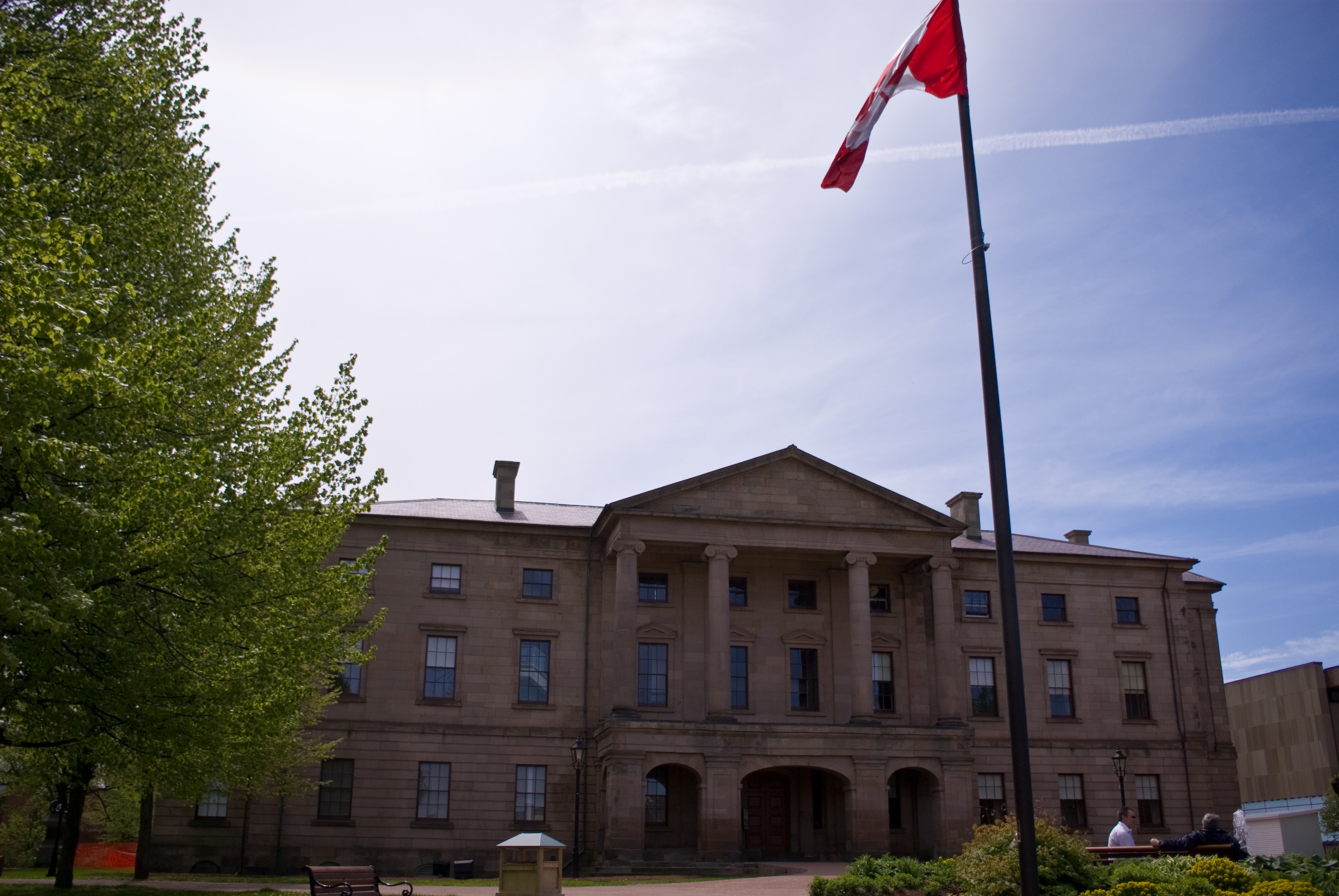
Province House houses the Legislative Assembly of Prince Edward Island and was the location for the Charlottetown Conference.

The city's streetscape with a centrally planned downtown core containing many Victorian-era houses and buildings is an attraction, as well as the waterfront redevelopment project in recent decades which has seen walking trails and parks developed on former industrial lands. A new cruise ship terminal was opened by the port authority in September 2007 which, proponents hope, will make the city a more attractive destination for the growing number of vessels operating in the Gulf of St. Lawrence.

Popular attractions within the city include the provincial legislature at Province House, which hosted the Charlottetown Conference, as well as Founders Hall, a recently redeveloped railway maintenance building which now houses an interactive trip through history tracing the development of Canada as a nation.

The Confederation Centre of the Arts provides live theatre, including the Charlottetown Festival during the summer months, as well as the Confederation Centre Art Gallery. The Charlottetown Festival itself is headlined by Canada's most popular and longest-running musical, Anne of Green Gables - The Musical, an adaptation of Island author Lucy Maud Montgomery's novel. Several other small theatres and galleries can be found immediately surrounding the Confederation centre including the Mac (MacKenzie theatre), the Arts Guild, and Pilar Shepard gallery.

There are 11 National Historic Sites of Canada located in Charlottetown, including Province House and the Confederation Centre of the Arts.

=== Sports ===
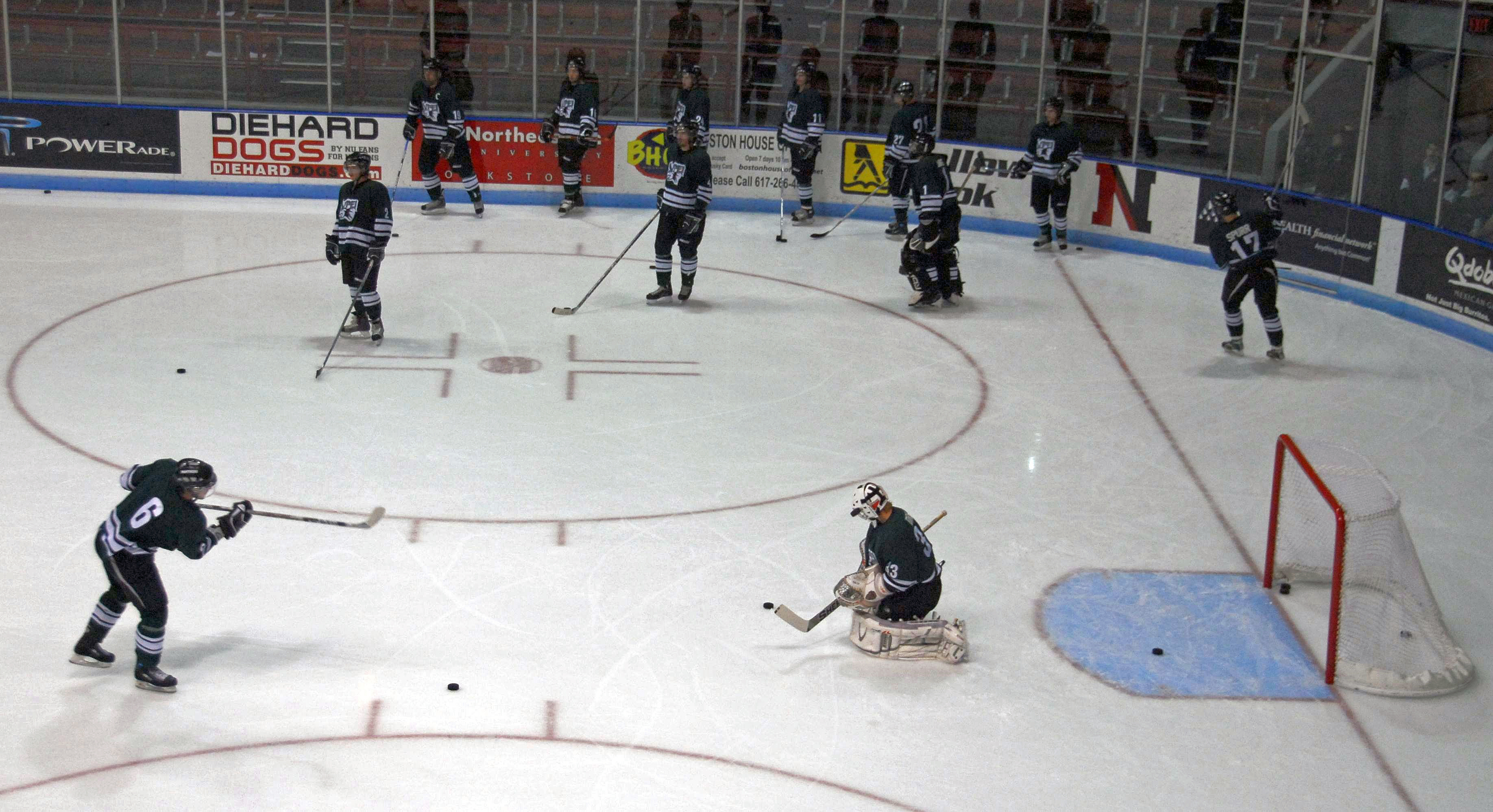
The UPEI Panthers practising at MacLauchlan Arena. The team is one of several amateur varsity teams in the city.

Charlottetown has numerous parks and playing fields for soccer, baseball, softball, football, rugby, and field hockey. Cricket also has been gaining popularity after building a ground and a cricket pitch at Tea hill park in Stratford. There are also many outdoor tennis courts, recreational trails, and running tracks. Most public schools in the city have gymnasiums available for public use outside of school hours and there are community-owned and operated hockey arenas and swimming pools, as well as several privately operated fitness centres.

Amateur varsity team sports are prevalent for males and females in the city's two senior high schools, Colonel Gray and Charlottetown Rural, as well as the University of Prince Edward Island's varsity teams (the UPEI Panthers) through the institution's affiliation with Canadian Interuniversity Sport. Holland College also has varsity teams, the Holland Hurricanes.

There is one junior hockey team in the community: the Quebec Maritimes Junior Hockey League's Charlottetown Islanders. The city was home to the Island Storm of the now-defunct National Basketball League of Canada from 2013 to 2020.

Other notable sporting events held by Charlottetown include:

- 1991 Canada Winter Games
- 2009 Canada Summer Games (Co-hosted with Summerside)

== Demographics ==
Federal census population history of Charlottetown (post-amalgamation)
Year	Pop.	±%
1991	31,541	—
1996	32,531	+3.1%
2001	32,245	−0.9%
2006	32,174	−0.2%
2011	34,562	+7.4%
2016	36,094	+4.4%
2021	38,809	+7.5%
Source: Statistics Canada

Federal census population history of Charlottetown (pre-amalgamation)
Year	Pop.	±%
1871	7,872	—
1881	10,345	+31.4%
1891	10,098	−2.4%
1901	10,718	+6.1%
1911	9,883	−7.8%
1921	10,814	+9.4%
1931	12,361	+14.3%
1941	14,821	+19.9%
1951	15,887	+7.2%
1956	16,707	+5.2%
1961	18,318	+9.6%
1966	18,427	+0.6%
1971	19,133	+3.8%
1976	17,063	−10.8%
1981	15,282	−10.4%
1986	15,776	+3.2%
1991	15,396	−2.4%
Source: Statistics Canada

In the 2021 Canadian census conducted by Statistics Canada, Charlottetown had a population of 38,809 living in 17,184 of its 18,364 total private dwellings, a change of 7.5% from its 2016 population of 36,094. With a land area of 44.27 km^{2} (17.09 sq mi), it had a population density of 876.6/km^{2} (2,270.5/sq mi) in 2021.

In the 2021 census, children under five account for approximately 3.9% of the resident population of Charlottetown. This compares with 4.4% in Prince Edward Island, and 5.0% for Canada overall. 21.0% of the resident population in Charlottetown are of retirement age compared with 21.2% in Prince Edward Island and 19.0% in Canada. The median age is 40.8 years of age compared to 44.0 years of age for Prince Edward Island and 41.6 years of age for all of Canada.

There are 17,193 total private dwellings in Charlottetown with an occupancy rate of 93.6%. The median value of a private dwelling is $200,284 compared to $341,556 nationally. The population density is 814.1 per square kilometre.

The 2021 census reported that immigrants (individuals born outside Canada) comprise 5,245 persons or 13.9% of the total population of Charlottetown. Of the total immigrant population, the top countries of origin were China (1,030 persons or 19.6%), India (530 persons or 10.1%), Vietnam (410 persons or 7.8%), Syria (345 persons or 6.6%), Philippines (310 persons or 5.9%), United States (280 persons or 5.3%), United Kingdom (245 persons or 4.7%), Lebanon (115 persons or 2.2%), Iran (110 persons or 2.1%), and Jamaica (95 persons or 1.8%).

=== Ethnicity ===
Charlottetown is approximately 76.2% white, 21.8% visible minorities and 2.0% Indigenous as of 2021. The largest visible minority groups in Charlottetown are South Asian (6.4%), Chinese (5.0%), Black (2.9%), Arab (2.3%), and Southeast Asian (2.0%).

Panethnic groups in the City of Charlottetown (2001−2021)
Panethnic group	2021		2016		2011		2006		2001	
Panethnic group	Pop.	%	Pop.	%	Pop.	%	Pop.	%	Pop.	%
European (Note: Statistic includes all persons that did not make up part of a visible minority or an indigenous identity.)	28,670	76.25%	29,940	86.11%	30,035	90.15%	29,875	95.46%	30,320	97.15%
South Asian	2,390	6.36%	660	1.9%	340	1.02%	70	0.22%	60	0.19%
East Asian (Note: Statistic includes total responses of "Chinese", "Korean", and "Japanese" under visible minority section on census.)	2,035	5.41%	1,955	5.62%	1,560	4.68%	200	0.64%	150	0.48%
Southeast Asian (Note: Statistic includes total responses of "Filipino" and "Southeast Asian" under visible minority section on census.)	1,195	3.18%	340	0.98%	165	0.5%	15	0.05%	30	0.1%
African	1,090	2.9%	490	1.41%	255	0.77%	260	0.83%	140	0.45%
Middle Eastern (Note: Statistic includes total responses of "West Asian" and "Arab" under visible minority section on census.)	1,075	2.86%	630	1.81%	480	1.44%	290	0.93%	155	0.5%
Indigenous	745	1.98%	560	1.61%	300	0.9%	450	1.44%	280	0.9%
Latin American	240	0.64%	120	0.35%	130	0.39%	115	0.37%	70	0.22%
Other/multiracial (Note: Statistic includes total responses of "Visible minority, n.i.e." and "Multiple visible minorities" under visible minority section on census.)	165	0.44%	95	0.27%	40	0.12%	10	0.03%	20	0.06%
Total responses	37,600	96.88%	34,770	96.33%	33,315	96.39%	31,295	97.27%	31,210	96.79%
Total population	38,809	100%	36,094	100%	34,562	100%	32,174	100%	32,245	100%
Note: Totals greater than 100% due to multiple origin responses

Ethnic Origin 2021
Ethnic Origin	Population	Percent
Scottish	11,650	31.0%
Irish	10,140	27.0%
English	9,830	21.0%
Canadian	4,595	12.2%
French n.o.s	4,120	11.0%
Chinese	1,765	4.7%
German	1,520	4.0%
Indian (India)	1,465	3.9%
Acadian	1,460	3.9%
Caucasian (White) n.o.s	1,320	3.5%
Dutch	850	2.3%

=== Language ===
78.6% of Charlottetown residents spoke English as their first language. Other common mother tongues are Chinese languages (4.3%), Punjabi (2.0%) French (1.8%), Arabic (1.7%), and Vietnamese (1.2%). 1.8% of residents listed both English and a non-official language as mother tongues.

=== Religion ===
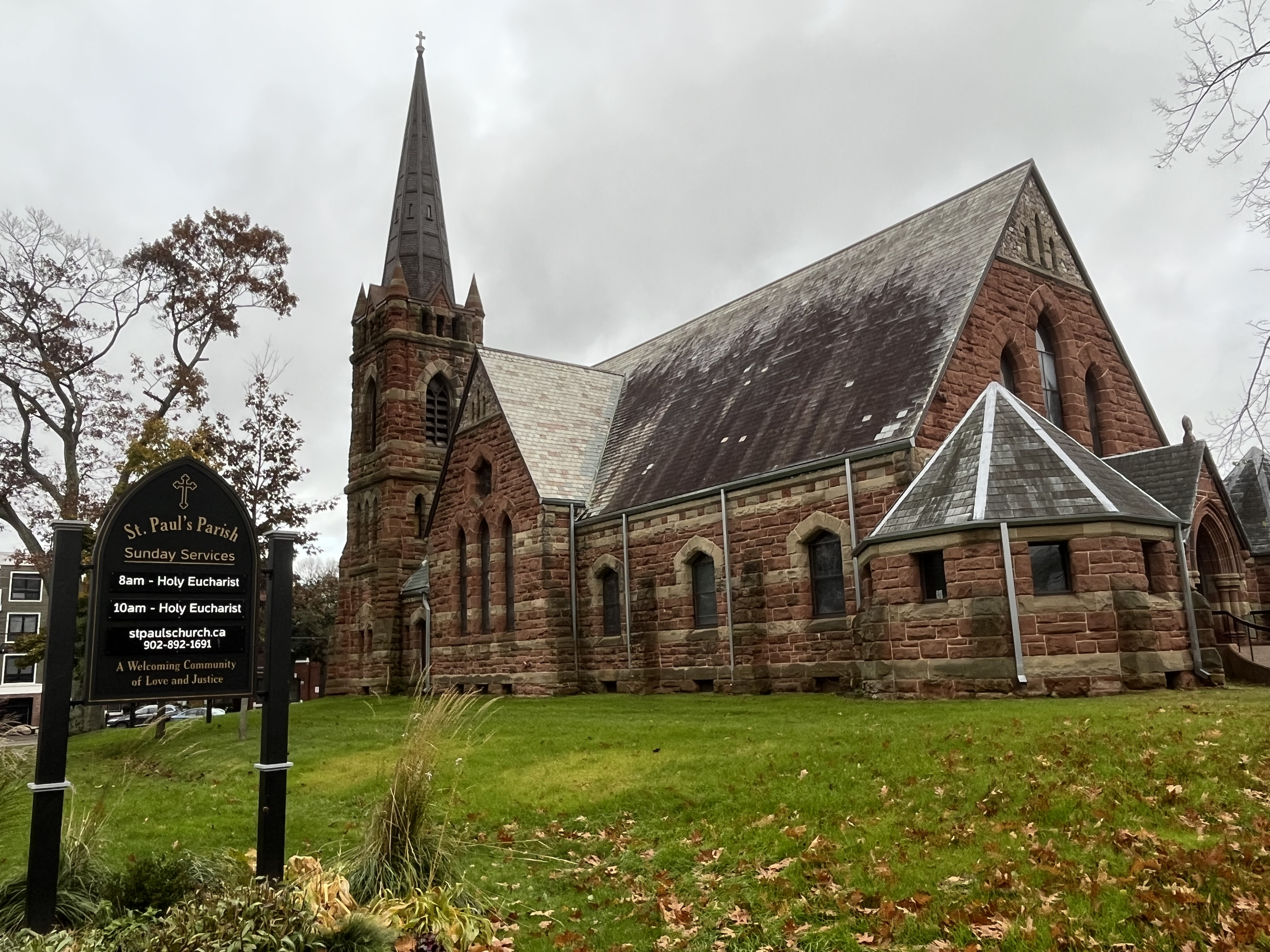
St. Paul's Anglican Parish in Charlottetown

According to the 2021 census, religious groups in Charlottetown included:

- Christianity (21,665 persons or 57.6%)
- Irreligion (12,425 persons or 33.0%)
- Islam (1,265 persons or 3.4%)
- Hinduism (860 persons or 2.3%)
- Sikhism (635 persons or 1.7%)
- Buddhism (350 persons or 0.9%)
- Judaism (70 persons or 0.2%)
- Indigenous Spirituality (15 persons or <0.1%)
- Other (310 persons or 0.8%)

As of 2021, 57.6% of residents are Christians, down from 75.4% in 2011. 28.9% were Catholic, 16.9% were Protestant, 7.2% were Christian n.o.s, and 4.7% were other Christian denominations and Christian-related traditions. Non-religious or secular people are 33.0% of the population, up from 20.8% in 2011. There are also significant populations of Muslims (3.4%) and Sikhs (1.7%).

== Economy ==
Charlottetown's economy is dominated by the public sector. The provincial, federal, and municipal levels of government are significant employers in the central part of Queens County, as are the health care and secondary and post-secondary education sectors. Technology companies have increased their share of the city's workforce, however the actual numbers are quite small once call-centres are excluded. Other significant economic activities include light manufacturing, such as chemicals, bio-technology, and machining.

== Government ==
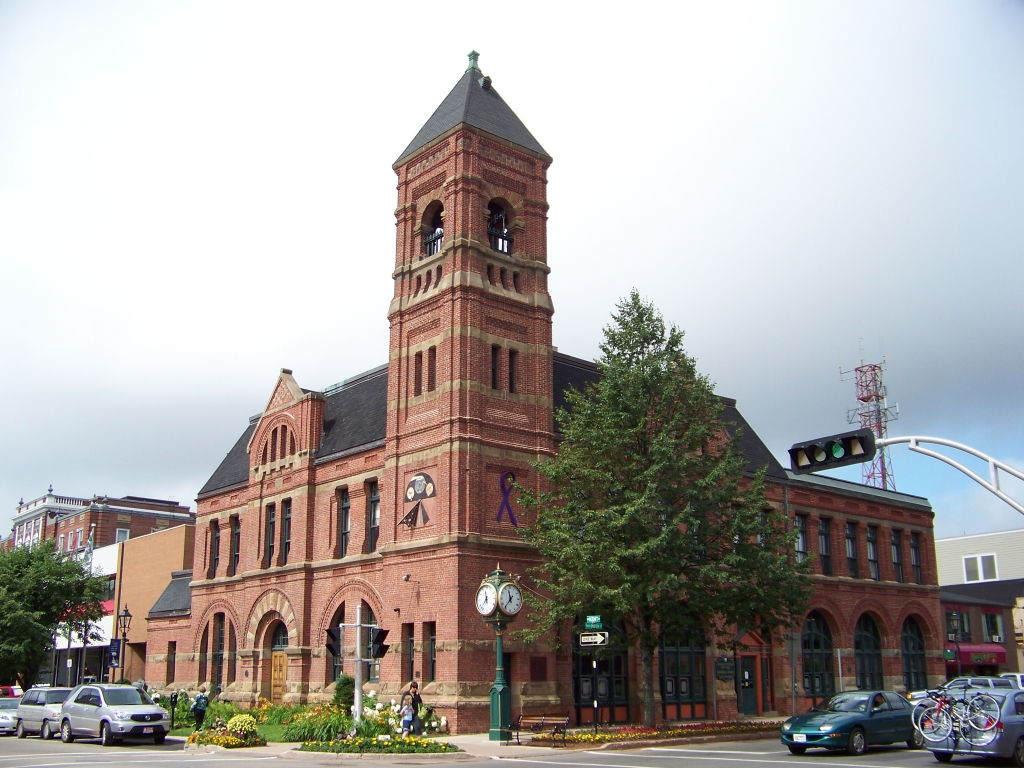
Charlottetown City Hall is the seat of municipal government.

The city's municipal government is structured around a council with a mayor and ten councillors elected using the ward system. The current mayor of the city is Philip Brown.

Charlottetown has seven seats (out of 27) in the Legislative Assembly of Prince Edward Island. Some of these electoral districts occupy adjacent rural areas that are not within the city's boundaries.

The city has a single seat in the House of Commons; the current Member of Parliament is Sean Casey.

== Transportation ==
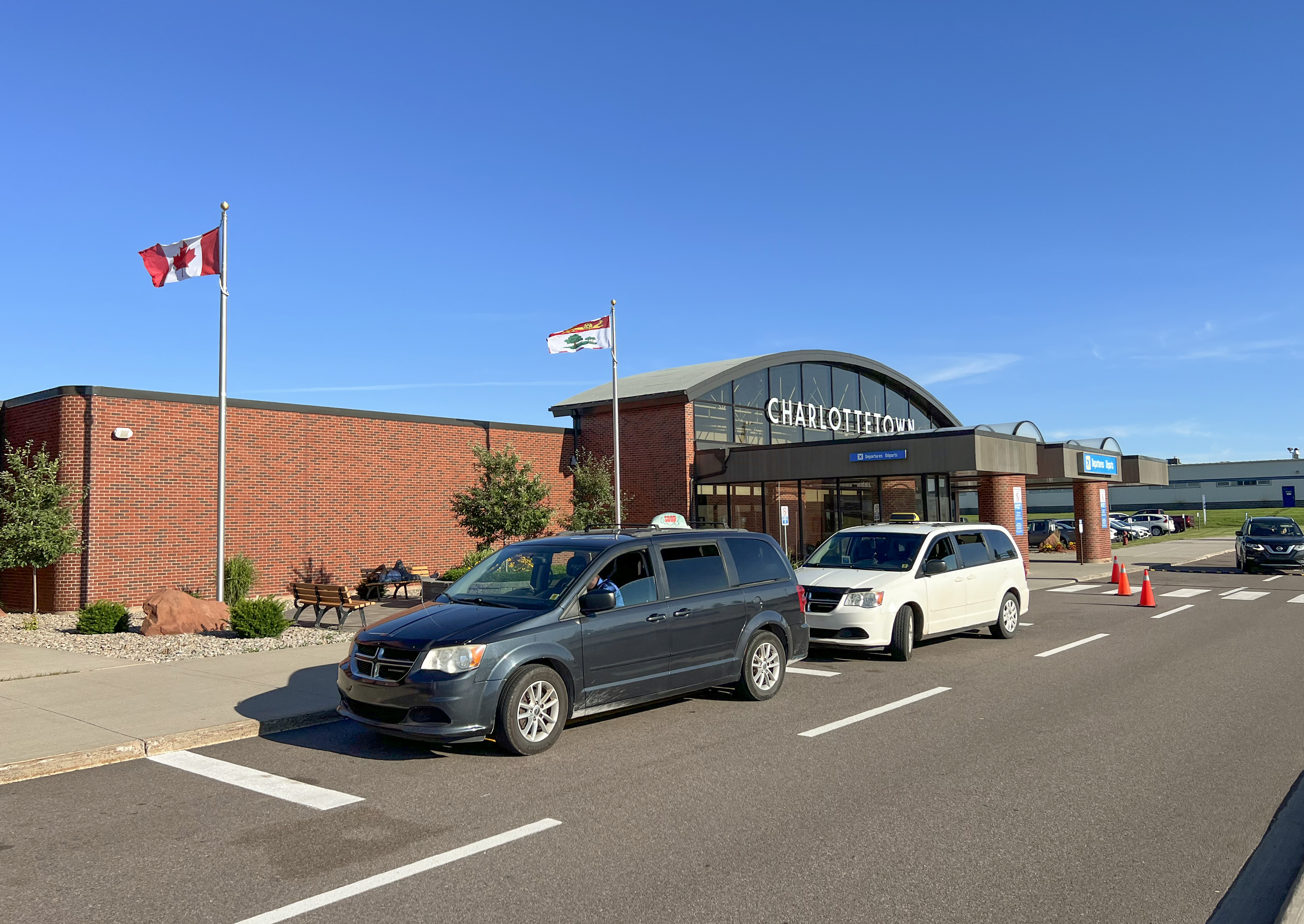
Charlottetown Airport is the province's only airport with scheduled passenger service.

Historically, Charlottetown was the centre of the province's railway network. Highway development in the latter part of the 20th century has resulted in the city being the focal point of several important routes in the province. Route 1, the Trans-Canada Highway, partially bisects the northern suburbs, linking with Riverside Drive, the Hillsborough River Bridge and the North River Causeway/Bridge on a limited-access arterial highway linking the city with the Confederation Bridge in the west and the Northumberland Ferries terminal in the east. Route 2, the province's main east–west highway intersects with Route 1 in the city.

Charlottetown Airport is the province's only airport with scheduled passenger airline service, serving 280,000 passengers per year.

Charlottetown Transit was founded in 2005 and offers 10 bus routes around town.

The absence of public transit for many decades in Charlottetown resulted in a dependence on personal use of automobiles, with municipal governments constructing three large above-ground parking garages in the city's historic district to house vehicles of downtown workers. The city also had a statistically higher proportion of taxis than the Canadian average as taxi service became a last-resort for many residents without access to a vehicle.

The Charlottetown Harbour Authority operates the city's commercial port and is currently expanding a marine terminal which was formerly operated by the federal government. Importation of gravel for construction and petroleum products are the main port activities.

== Education ==
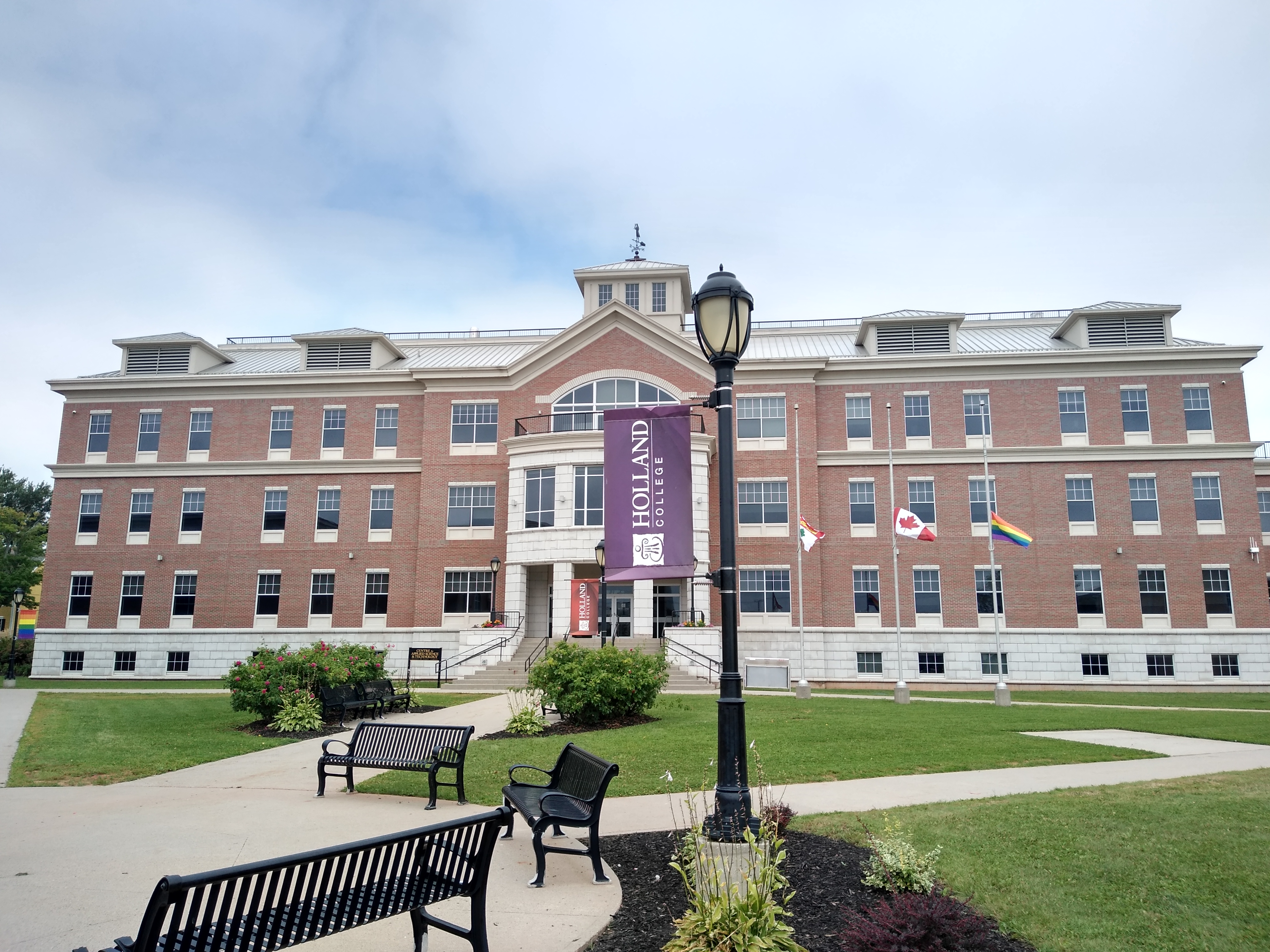
Holland College, Charlottetown

English public schooling (gr. K-12) in Charlottetown is provided by the Public Schools Branch. French public schooling (gr. K-12) in the city is provided by the Commission scolaire de langue française.

The city also has two independent schools: Immanuel Christian School and Grace Christian School.

Charlottetown is home to the University of Prince Edward Island. UPEI has programs in Arts, Education, Science, Business, Nursing and Engineering. The provincial university also houses the Atlantic Veterinary College.

Charlottetown is also home to several campuses of Holland College, the province's community college. In addition, there are various private training colleges in the city.

== Notable people ==
- Milton Acorn, poet
- Jared Connaughton, Olympic athlete
- Dorothy Corrigan, first and only female mayor of Charlottetown
- Lloyd Duffy, jockey
- Mike Duffy, Canadian senator and television journalist
- Kara Grant, Canadian pentathlon Olympian, 2004 Summer Olympics
- Dylan Mohan Gray, filmmaker
- Vern Handrahan, former professional baseball player, Kansas City Athletics
- Wally Hennessey, harness racing driver
- Bonnie Henry, provincial officer, British Columbia Ministry of Health
- Ross Johnston, professional ice hockey player, New York Islanders
- Lorie Kane, professional LPGA golfer
- Joey Kitson, Celtic rock musician and lead singer, Rawlins Cross
- Troy Little, comic book artist, graphic designer, creator of Chiaroscuro
- Whitney Rose, country musician
- Al MacAdam, former professional ice hockey player, Minnesota North Stars, Philadelphia Flyers, and Vancouver Canucks
- Amber MacArthur, television personality and author
- David MacEachern, Olympic gold medalist bobsled, 1998 Winter Olympics
- Zack MacEwen, professional ice hockey player, Ottawa Senators
- Charles Andrew MacGillivary, Medal of Honor recipient for action with the U.S. Army during World War II
- Martha MacIsaac, actress
- Tara MacLean, singer-songwriter
- Cynthia MacLeod, fiddler
- Elizabeth S. MacLeod, poet
- Don McDougall, former president, Labatt Brewing Company
- Adam McQuaid, former professional ice hockey player, Boston Bruins, Columbus Blue Jackets, and New York Rangers
- Sarah Newcomb Merrick, teacher, writer, businessperson, and physician
- Don Messer, fiddler and radio and TV show host, Don Messer's Jubilee
- Lucy Maud Montgomery, author
- Heather Moyse, Olympic gold medalist in bobsledding, 2010 and 2014 Winter Olympics
- Chris Murphy, rock musician, Sloan
- Emerson Sanderson (Denim), Canadian drag queen known for competing and placing third on the fourth series of Canada's Drag Race
- Gary Simmons, former professional ice hockey player, California Golden Seals, Cleveland Barons, and Los Angeles Kings
- Frederick Thornton Peters, Victoria Cross recipient for action off the coast of Algeria during World War II
- Jackie Torrens, comedian, Made in Canada, actor, writer, and journalist
- Jonathan Torrens, actor, writer, and producer
- Brian Tracy, self-development author and board member, The Heritage Foundation
- Rick Vaive, former professional ice hockey player, Toronto Maple Leafs and other teams
- William Henry Weeks, former architect in California
- James Wood, former Commander of the Royal Canadian Navy

== See also ==
- Royal eponyms in Canada
- Provinces and territories of Canada
