= West Royalty, Prince Edward Island =

Human settlement in Prince Edward Island, Canada

Coordinates: 46°15′51.7″N 63°9′29.2″W

West Royalty is a neighbourhood of the city of Charlottetown in central Queens County, Prince Edward Island, Canada.

== History ==
Federal census population history of West Royalty
Year	Pop.	±%
1976	1,244	—
1981	1,686	+35.5%
1986	2,070	+22.8%
1991	3,142	+51.8%
Source: Statistics Canada

West Royalty was originally a farming community in the western part of Queens Royalty, from which it derives its name. It was officially designated a settlement in 1939 and it became a village in 1980. It was amalgamated into the City of Charlottetown on April 1, 1995.

Presently a neighbourhood, West Royalty has a mix of housing, commercial and light industrial districts as well as the major retail district centred on the intersections of Route 1 and Route 2, as well as Route 2 and the perimeter highway.

== Geography ==
West Royalty is located in the northwestern part of the city on the border of Spring Park, Sherwood and Winsloe (all neighbourhoods of Charlottetown). West Royalty's western boundary is defined by the North (Yorke) River which separates Charlottetown from the town of Cornwall. Its northwestern boundary (and that of the city) is shared with the adjacent village of Miltonvale Park.

== Suburban growth ==
During the 1960s, Route 1, the Trans-Canada Highway, was constructed through the community which led to increased residential and commercial growth. The West Royalty Industrial Park (now West Royalty Business Park) was established by the provincial government in the 1970s as part of an economic development program and became a major employer.

West Royalty has experienced the majority of residential growth in the greater Charlottetown area from the 1970s-1990s and includes several residential subdivisions:

- Orchard Hill subdivision
- Lewis Point Park subdivision
- Beach Grove subdivision
- Highland View subdivision
- Gates subdivision
- Bell Heights subdivision
- Richmond Hill subdivision
- Park West subdivision
- Upton Park subdivision
- Sandlewood Park subdivision

During the 1970s, the Charlottetown Mall was established at the intersection of Route 1 and Route 2, making this area of West Royalty the province's primary retail centre. Further big box store development in the 1990s and 2000s initially spurred by the establishment of the province's first big box store (a Sobeys supermarket) in the vicinity of the mall has seen stores such as Canadian Tire, Best Buy, and Walmart Canada locate in the area. The construction of the Charlottetown Perimeter Highway in the early 2000s north of the mall location has seen a new big box retail development called the Royalty Power Centre.
