= Spring Park =

Spring Park can refer to several different places:

== Places ==
Canada

- Spring Park, Prince Edward Island

United States

- Spring Park, Minnesota

United Kingdom

- Spring Park, Croydon
