= Coat of arms of Charlottetown =

Coat of Arms of Charlottetown
- Armiger: Charlottetown, Prince Edward Island
- Adopted: 1989
- Crest: helmet mantled Vert doubled Argent on a wreath Argent and Vert issuing from a circlet of Lady Slipper (Cypripendium acaule) flowers
- Shield: The coat of arms is a simple white and green shield with a depiction of the coronation crown of Queen Charlotte Sophia in the middle.
- Supporters: Dexter a griffin Argent sinister a fox Argent
- Compartment: meadow above red soil proper washed by waves of Charlottetown harbour Argent and Azure
- Motto: Cunabula Foederis

The coat of arms of Charlottetown is the full armorial achievement as used by the municipal government as an official symbol.

The coat of arms is a simple white and green shield with the coronation crown of Queen Charlotte Sophia of England in the middle.
