= Elizabeth S. MacLeod =

Canadian poet

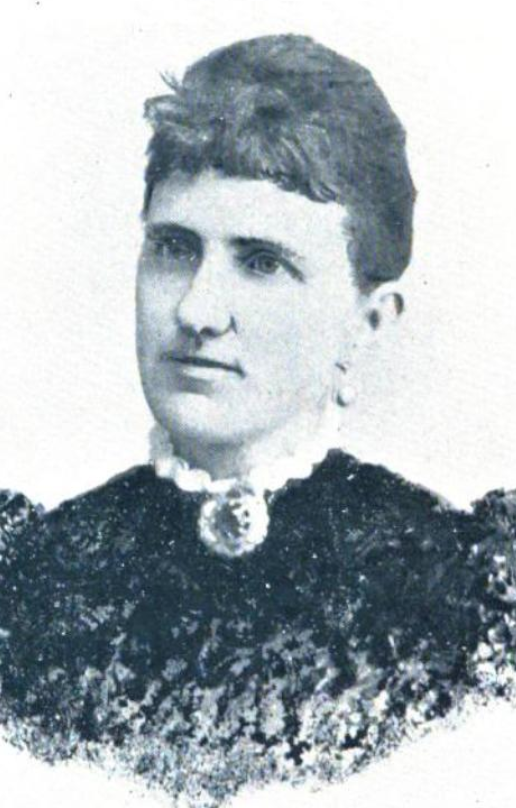
- Elizabeth S. MacLeod, from an 1893 publication
- Born: Elizabeth Susan MacQueen; 23 February 1842; Edinburgh, Scotland, U.K.
- Died: 15 January 1939 (aged 96); Charlottetown, Prince Edward Island, Canada
- Other names: E. S. MacLeod
- Occupation: Poet

Elizabeth Susan MacLeod (23 February 1842 – 15 January 1939) was a Scottish-born Canadian poet, called the "Island Poetess" in reference to her adopted home, Prince Edward Island.

== Early life and education ==
Elizabeth Susan MacQueen was born in Edinburgh, the daughter of Martin MacQueen and Sophia (or Susan) E. Treherne MacQueen. She attended Bishop's School in Dundee.

== Career ==
MacLeod was known as the "Island Poetess", for her strong identification with Prince Edward Island after immigrating to marry in 1878. Her foray into historical fiction, Donalda (1905), was considered less successful than her patriotic poetry. "She has written some fair verse, but it is quite clear that she knows little of prose," commented a review in The Canadian Magazine.

== Publications ==
- Carols of Canada (1893, poetry)
- "Alexander MacKenzie" (1900, poem)
- For the Flag; or, Lays and Incidents of the South African War (1901, poetry and nonfiction)
- Donalda, A Scottish-Canadian Story (1905, novel)
- "The Olden Flag" (1907, poem)

== Personal life ==
MacQueen married her second cousin, Alexander D. MacLeod, a customs official based on Prince Edward Island. They had sons Victor and Hugh. Her husband died in 1907, and she died in 1939, at age 96, in Charlottetown.
