= Parkdale, Prince Edward Island =

Neighbourhood in Charlottetown

Coordinates: 46°15′N 63°07′W

Federal census population history of Parkdale
| Year | Pop. | ±% |
|---|---|---|
| 1956 | 1,422 | — |
| 1961 | 1,735 | +22.0% |
| 1966 | 2,071 | +19.4% |
| 1971 | 2,313 | +11.7% |
| 1976 | 2,172 | −6.1% |
| 1981 | 2,018 | −7.1% |
| 1986 | 2,065 | +2.3% |
| 1991 | 2,198 | +6.4% |
Source: Statistics Canada

Parkdale is a neighbourhood of the city of Charlottetown in central Queens County, Prince Edward Island, Canada.

Parkdale's location immediately northeast of Charlottetown and southeast of Sherwood saw it grow from a rural farming community in the Queens Royalty to a village on November 6, 1958. It was incorporated as a town in 1973 and amalgamated into Charlottetown on April 1, 1995.

Presently a neighbourhood, Parkdale has a mix of housing, commercial and light industrial districts across an area of several dozen hectares, bounded by the former railway line (now the Confederation Trail) to the south and west, Belvedere Avenue/Falconwood Drive to the north, and the Hillsborough River to the east.

Parkdale had an active volunteer fire department, which was closed after municipal amalgamation. It is also the location of the Provincial Exhibition and Charlottetown Driving Park.
