= Charlottetown meteorite =

Meteorite fall in Prince Edward Island, Canada

Charlottetown
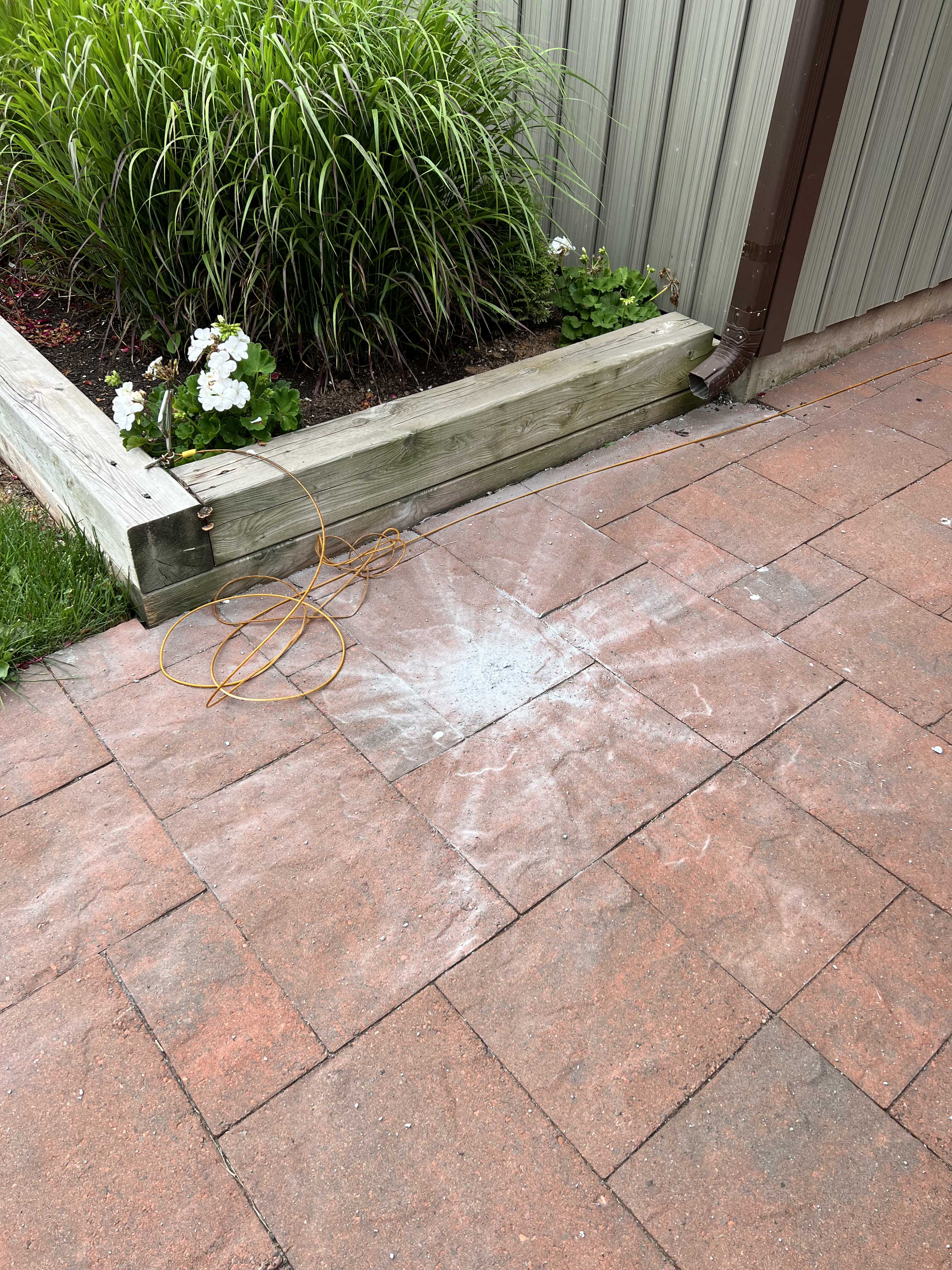
- Charlottetown meteorite impact splotch
- Type: Chondrite
- Class: Ordinary chondrite
- Group: H5
- Country: Canada
- Region: Prince Edward Island
- Coordinates: 46°17.345′N 63°4.111′W
- Observed fall: Yes
- Fall date: 17:02:20, July 25, 2024 (-03:00)
- Found date: July 25, 2024
- TKW: 95 g (3.4 oz)

The Charlottetown meteorite was a meteorite fall observed on July 25, 2024. It is notable as the first meteorite known with video and audio of the impact recorded and as the only known meteorite fall in Prince Edward Island, Canada.

The Charlottetown meteorite is classified as H5 ordinary chondrite. Its impact left a divot measuring about 2 cm (0.79 in) across.

== Impact ==
After an evening walk in the Marshfield neighbourhood of Charlottetown, Prince Edward Island, Laura Kelly and her partner Joe Velaidum found a starburst pattern of gray dust on their sidewalk. They cleared it away, not knowing what it was. Upon discovering home security camera footage of the impact, they suspected it was a meteorite. They contacted researchers, connecting with Chris Herd of the University of Alberta Meteorite Collection, and collected material from the impact.

The recorded sound of the impact has been described as similar to breaking ice. The impact created a divot some 2 centimetres (0.79 in) in diameter. Velaidum reports that he was standing at that location minutes before the meteorite struck it; he considers the event "a near-death experience".

The meteorite came from the asteroid belt, according to Herd, and would have traveled at least 200 kilometres per hour (124 mph) just prior to impact. According to Bob King, he estimates a diameter of 6–7 centimetres (2.4–2.8 in) for the impactor.

== Composition ==
Recovered fragments of the meteorite, ranging from less than one millimetre (0.039 in) up to seven millimetres (0.28 in) across, are made up of (per Herd) "very fine grained, mostly translucent crystals". It also contains larger, translucent white and gray crystals and metallic fragments.
