= Flag of Charlottetown =

Charlottetown
- Proportion: 1:2
- Adopted: August 28, 1989
- Designed by: Robert D. Watt

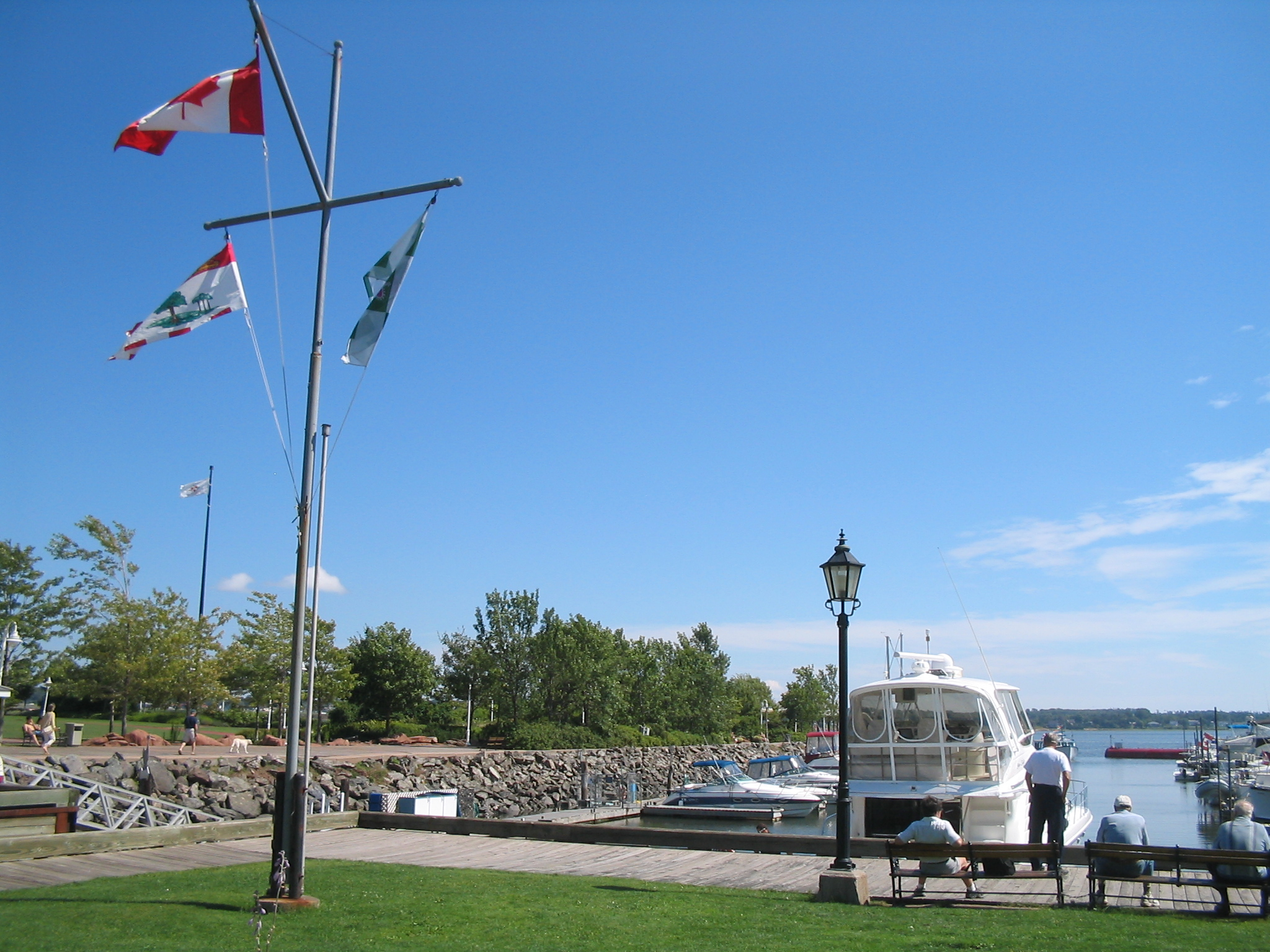
This is an image of the Peake's Wharf boardwalk in Charlottetown, Prince Edward Island.

The flag of Charlottetown is the official municipal flag of Charlottetown, Prince Edward Island. It was designed by Robert D. Watt.

== Design and symbolism ==
The flag is a banner of arms based on the city's arms in a 1:2 proportion. It is bordered on three sides with alternating green and white rectangles, such that the white rectangles have the same color as the field, with the rectangles meeting at angled corners at the fly end of the flag, emulating the border on the provincial flag. The field is white, and in the center is a green rectangle with a royal crown inside, with the rectangle representing Queens Square and the crown representing Queen Charlotte, the namesake of Charlottetown. Joined to the central rectangle at its corners are four green rectangles, symbolizing the four historic squares in Charlottetown: Rochford Square, Connaught Square, Hillsborough Square, and Kings Square. The five green rectangles are in proportions of 1:2 (they are square on the city arms), with the central rectangle representing 5/16 of the length of the flag, with the other rectangles having half of that length. The flag uses the Pantone colors Silver 427C (field), Green 349U, and Lavender 253U.

== Former flag ==
In the 1980s and 1990s, Charlottetown used a different flag. The flag consisted of the city seal atop a gray field. The city seal consisted of a white ring edged inside and out in black, with the words "CITY of CHARLOTTETOWN PRINCE EDWARD ISLAND" running clockwise from its base. In the center of the seal there is a scene showing a plough and a sheaf of wheat on a small hill in the foreground, and a tall, anchored ship on the ocean, flying a red flag in the background. A white ribbon with forked ends reads the word "INCORPORATED" and at the base of the disc are the words "AD. 1855" (the city's founding date).

== History ==
The current flag was designed by Robert D. Watt, the then Chief Herald of Canada, after the city applied to the Canadian Heraldic Authority for a flag.
