= Winsloe, Prince Edward Island =

Human settlement in Canada

Coordinates: 46°17′34.2″N 63°10′33.7″W

Winsloe is a neighbourhood in the northwestern part of the Canadian city of Charlottetown, Prince Edward Island.

== History ==
Federal census population history of Winsloe
Year	Pop.	±%
1981	1,067	—
1986	1,123	+5.2%
1991	1,105	−1.6%
Source: Statistics Canada

Winsloe was named for John Hodges Winsloe, the owner of the majority of the land in the area during the mid-19th century.

The community developed as a farming settlement on the northern boundary of the township of Queens Royalty, however the construction of the Malpeque Road between the colonial capital of Charlottetown to the south and the shire town of Prince County in Prince Royalty to the northwest saw Winsloe became a service centre on the stagecoach route.

The arrival of the Prince Edward Island Railway in 1872 saw Winsloe placed on the mainline between Charlottetown and Summerside and later Port Borden. The construction of Route 2 during the later part of the 20th century sealed Winsloe's fate as a developing suburb to Charlottetown.

Its status was upgraded to a village in 1971 and several subdivision developments were created in the community during the 1970s-1990s. On April 1, 1995 the village was amalgamated into the city of Charlottetown.

Since 1995 the village of Winsloe has been developing rapidly. The Winsloe soccer club has seen major improvements as well as new neighbourhood development.
