= East Royalty, Prince Edward Island =

Canadian neighbourhood of Charlottetown, Prince Edward Island

Coordinates: 46°16′38.5″N 63°6′11.1″W

Federal census population history of East Royalty
Year	Pop.	±%
1981	1,863	—
1986	2,039	+9.4%
1991	2,052	+0.6%
Source: Statistics Canada

East Royalty is a neighbourhood of the Canadian city of Charlottetown, Prince Edward Island.

East Royalty is located in the northeast portion of the city and occupies the eastern part of the township of Queens Royalty.

Originally a rural farming community, East Royalty became an incorporated village before being amalgamated into Charlottetown on April 1, 1995.
