= Cynthia MacLeod =

Canadian fiddler

Cynthia MacLeod is a Canadian fiddler from Prince Edward Island. She describes her fiddling style as "Cape Breton". In addition to recording, hosting standing-room-only ceilidhs in Brackley Beach, and touring, she teaches workshops both in Canada and the United States.

== Discography ==
- Head over Heels (2002)
- Crackerjack (2004)
- Hot Off the Floor (2007)
- Riddle (2010)
- Live at the Brackley Beach Ceilidh (2012)

== Awards ==
Year	Album/Song Title	Award	Category
2002	Head Over Heels	Prince Edward Island Music Award	Album of the Year
2002		Prince Edward Island Music Award	Female Artist of the Year
2002		Prince Edward Island Music Award	New Artist of the Year
2002		Prince Edward Island Music Award	Roots/Traditional Artist/Group of the Year
2002		Prince Edward Island Music Award	Instrumental Artist/Group of the Year
2002		Prince Edward Island Music Award	Group of the Year (w/former band, Fiddlers' Sons)
2003		Prince Edward Island Music Award	Instrumental Artist Group of the Year
2003		Prince Edward Island Music Award	Roots/Traditional Artist/Group of the Year
2003		Prince Edward Island Music Award	Entertainer of the Year
2004		Prince Edward Island Music Award	Instrumental Artist/Group of the Year
2004		Prince Edward Island Music Award	Roots/Traditional Artist/Group of the Year
2004		Prince Edward Island Music Award	Country Artist/Group of the Year
2004		Prince Edward Island Music Award	Entertainer of the Year
