= Queens Royalty, Prince Edward Island =

Township in Prince Edward Island, Canada

Coordinates: 46.264°N 63.131°W

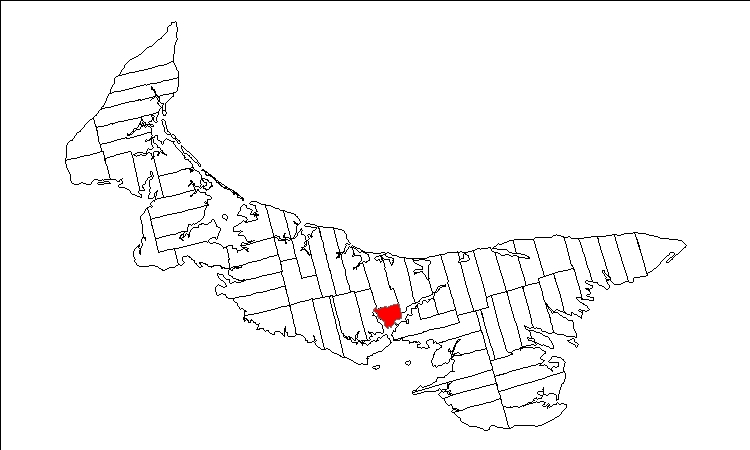

Queens Royalty is the royalty for Queens County, Prince Edward Island, Canada.

The township was established as part of the colonial survey of 1764 undertaken by Capt. Samuel J. Holland. It was intended to host the colonial capital of Prince Edward Island and shire town of Queens County, what would become known as Charlottetown. The township is located on a peninsula bounded by the Yorke (North) River on the west and the Hillsborough (East) River on the east.

Originally, Charlottetown was unincorporated, therefore the "royalty" and the community were largely synonymous, with many using the term "Charlottetown Royalty". Charlottetown itself was not officially incorporated as a town until 1855 (and then only hosted 6,000 residents) and only became a city in 1885. The municipality's early boundaries (surveyed as 500 residential/commercial land parcels) only occupied a small portion of the township, with the remainder being divided into 12 acre properties, some of which were purchased as farms from the Crown, the remainder being estates or unused lands.

The township was subdivided into an East Royalty, Central Royalty, and West Royalty, with the Central Royalty having common grazing land for all residents.

Today, the royalty is almost entirely within the boundaries of the current city of Charlottetown, which has merged various outlying municipalities and rural areas through municipal amalgamation.

Queens Royalty is part of Charlotte Parish.
