= List of Prince Edward Island government agencies and Crown corporations =

This is a list of Crown corporations and agencies of the Government of Prince Edward Island.

Crown corporations in PEI are public-sector organizations established and funded by the Government of Prince Edward Island to provide specialized goods and services to citizens. They operate at varying levels of government control, depending on how they are defined, funded, and the kinds of services they provide. In general, though they are technically owned by the government, they operate at arm's length from the public service and the elected officials of the government.

Individually, every public sector organization in PEI is assigned a ministry that is responsible for the organization. That minister is the primary link between the P.E.I. government and the organization and is held accountable to the government for the performance of the organization.

== Current organizations ==
The following is a list of current Crown agencies and corporations in Prince Edward Island as of 2025.

Organization	Responsible department
Agricultural Insurance Corporation	Agriculture
PEI Grain Elevators Corporation	Agriculture
Innovation PEI	Economic Development, Innovation and Trade
Finance PEI	Economic Development, Innovation and Trade
Island Investment Development Inc.	Economic Development, Innovation and Trade
Charlottetown Area Development Corporation	Economic Development, Innovation and Trade
Summerside Area Development Corporation	Economic Development, Innovation and Trade
PEI Student Financial Assistance Corporation	Education and Early Years
PEI Energy Corporation	Environment, Energy and Climate Action
PEI Lotteries Commission	Finance
PEI Liquor Control Commission	Finance
Self-Insurance and Risk Management Fund	Finance
PEI Marine Science Organization	Fisheries, Tourism, Sports and Culture
PEI Museum and Heritage Foundation	Fisheries, Tourism, Sports and Culture
Tourism PEI	Fisheries, Tourism, Sports and Culture
Health PEI	Health and Wellness
PEI Human Rights Commission	Justice and Public Safety
PEI Housing Corporation	Housing, Land and Communities
PEI Crown Building Corporation	Transportation and Infrastructure
Island Waste Management Corporation	Transportation and Infrastructure

== See also ==
- Crown corporations of Canada
