= PEI Cannabis =

Canadian cannabis retailer

- Company type: Crown corporation
- Industry: Retail
- Founded: October 17, 2018; 7 years ago
- Headquarters: Canada
- Number of locations: 26
- Key people: Danny MacDonald (CEO); Darlene Compton (Minister)
- Products: Cannabis sales and distribution
- Revenue: $22,500,680 (2022-2023)
- Net income: $2,909,096 (2022-2023
- Owner: Government of Prince Edward Island
- Parent: Prince Edward Island Liquor Control Commission
- Website: peicannabiscorp.com

PEI Cannabis (formally, known as PEI Cannabis Management Corporation) is a Crown corporation responsible for supply to retail sales of cannabis products in the Canadian province of Prince Edward Island. It is incorporated as a subsidiary of PEI Liquor, formally known as the PEI Liquor Control Commission.

== History ==
In March 2018, the Prince Edward Island government announced the establishment of two retail locations: Montague and Summerside. Two further locations were announced in April: Charlottetown and O'Leary, but the O'Leary store was delayed to January 2019. PEI Cannabis made significant investments in online infrastructure to meet projected demand.

Preliminarily, according to, PEI Cannabis, $152,408,35 of cannabis products were sold on P.E.I. the first day of legalization. Due to high demand, by November 2018, PEI Cannabis had announced plans to expand its workforce.

For the 2019/2020 fiscal year, online sales accounted for 1% of total revenue.
