= PEI Museum and Heritage Foundation =

PEI Crown Corporation

- Company type: Crown corporation
- Key people: Matthew McRae (Executive Director)
- Website: peimuseum.ca

The PEI Museum and Heritage Foundation is a crown corporation responsible for the maintenance of museums on Prince Edward Island. The Foundation is also responsible for the provincial collection of over 100,000 cultural objects.

It was originally created in 1970 as the PEI Heritage Foundation with the purpose of preserving Island heritage. The Foundation is currently responsibility of the Minister of Fisheries, Sport, Tourism and Culture.

== List of Sites ==
There are currently seven museums operated by the Foundation.

Sites
Museum	Location	Established
Acadian Museum	Miscouche	1964
Basin Head Fisheries Museum	Souris	
Beaconsfield Historic House	Charlottetown	
Elmira Railway Museum	Elmira	
Eptek Art & Culture Centre	Summerside	1978
Green Park Shipbuilding Museum and Yeo House	Green Park	
Orwell Corner Historic Village	Orwell	1973
Kensington Locomotive	Kensington	1990
