= Prince County Hospital =

- Health PEI
- Location in Prince Edward Island

Geography
- Location: 65 Roy Boates Avenue; Summerside, Prince Edward Island; C1N 2A9
- Coordinates: 46°25′02″N 63°46′23″W

Organisation
- Type: Acute care

Services
- Emergency department: Yes
- Beds: 110

Helipads
- Helipad: TC LID: CCH6

History
- Founded: 2004

Links
- Website: Prince County Hospital

Prince County Hospital is an acute care hospital located in Summerside, Prince Edward Island, Canada.

Operated by Health PEI, the Prince County Hospital has a capacity of 102 beds. It is the province's second largest hospital after the Queen Elizabeth Hospital.

== History ==
Prince County Hospital traces its history to the early 1900s when it was the first hospital in Prince Edward Island to be located outside of Charlottetown. It was originally located on St. Stephen Street near Summerside's central business district but was replaced in 1951 by a facility located on Beattie Avenue. This facility was replaced in 2004 by the present facility located on a 27-acre property on Roy Boates Avenue in the city's north end.

Beattie Avenue was named to honour Grace Beattie, RN who was the first administrator of the hospital. Roy Boates Avenue was named to honour Roy Boates, a previous Director of Pharmacy at the hospital. Roy owned and managed a community pharmacy in Prince Edward Island from 1949 to 1974. He served on the executive of The Canadian Pharmacists Association and was on the Executive Council of The PEI Pharmacists Association for 20 years being president twice. In 1967 he was the first person in PEI to receive the Robins Bowl of Hygeia award for community service. In 1981 he went to Gambia under the auspices of CUSO (Canadian University Service Overseas) and served as Chief Pharmacist in Gambia. He initiated, supervised and implemented a new drug system. He was responsible for two hospitals, 16 health centers, 17 dispensaries, and 54 sub dispensaries. He also opened two new medical stores stocked with supplies from the Canadian Mission Relief Fund. He taught pharmacology to third year nursing students at the Royal Victoria Hospital in Banjul, Gambia. For his service he was awarded the Certificate of Recognition by the African Area President. Roy received The Canadian Pharmacists Association Meritorious Service Award in 1987 and the Order of Canada in 1990.

== Services ==
The Prince County Hospital offers the following services:

- Surgery
- Internal medicine
- Obstetrics
- Pediatrics
- Psychiatry
- Radiology
- Pathology
- Endoscopy
- Anesthesia
- Rehabilitation
- Oncology
- Emergency medicine
