= Department of Finance (Prince Edward Island) =

- ministère des Finances

Department overview
- Formed: 1873; 153 years ago
- Jurisdiction: Prince Edward Island
- Minister responsible: Jill Burridge
- Deputy Minister responsible: Denise Lewis Fleming

The Department of Finance (French: ministère des Finances) is the department of the Government of the Canadian province of Prince Edward Island responsible for ensuring that the financial, information technology, and human resources required by the Government are available, allocated in accordance with Government priorities, and used in an efficient and accountable way. The Ministry provides administrative, analytical, and policy support to the Treasury Board.

The minister of agriculture (currently Jill Burridge) is responsible for the department to the General Assembly. While the minister is head of the department, and provides policy/political direction, the day-to-day operations of the department are managed by the deputy minister (currently Denise Lewis Fleming), who is a public servant.

== History ==
The Department of Finance was formed in 1873 upon joining confederation with the purpose of better managing the governments finances.

=== Ministers ===
Name	Party	Term	
Jill Burridge (2 of 2)	Progressive Conservative	14 April 2023	Present
Mark McLane	Progressive Conservative	15 July 2022	3 April 2023
Jill Burridge (1 of 2)	Progressive Conservative	9 May 2019	15 July 2022
Heath Macdonald	Liberal	10 January 2018	23 April 2019
Allen Roach	Liberal	20 May 2015	10 January 2018
Wade McLauchlan	Liberal	23 February 2015	20 May 2015
Wes Sheridan	Liberal	12 June 2007	23 February 2015
Mitch Murphy	Progressive Conservative	9 October 2003	28 May 2007
Pat Mella	Progressive Conservative	18 November 1996	29 September 2003

== Agencies, boards and commissions ==
- Advisory Council on the Status of Women
- Classification Appeals Committee
- PEI Lotteries Commission
- Atlantic Provinces Harness Racing Commission
- PEI Liquor Control Commission
- PEI Master Trust Investment Advisory Board
- Public Service Commission
- Self-Insurance and Risk Management Fund Committee

== Legislation ==
The Department of Finance is responsible for a number of laws related to economic regulation in Prince Edward Island.

- Atlantic Provinces Harness Racing Commission Act
- Cannabis Management Corporation Act
- Cannabis Taxation Agreement Act
- Civil Service Act
- Climate Leadership Act
- Community Development Equity Tax Credit Act
- Condominium Act
- Deposit Receipt (Winding-up) Act
- Environment Tax Act
- Financial Administration Act
- Financial Corporation Capital Tax Act
- Gasoline Tax Act
- Health Tax Act
- Income Tax Act
- King's Printer Act
- Lotteries Commission Act
- Maritime Provinces Harness Racing Commission Act
- Northumberland Strait Crossing Act
- Pension Plan Transfer Act
- Procurement of Goods Act
- Public Sector Pay Reduction Act
- Public Sector Pension Plan Act
- Real Property Assessment Act
- Real Property Tax Act
- Real Property Transfer Tax Act
- Registry Act
- Retail Sales Tax Act
- Revenue Administration Act
- Revenue Tax Act
- Statistics Act
- Tobacco Tax Act
- Vaping Products Taxation Agreement Act
