= Hillsborough Hospital =

- Health PEI
- Location in Prince Edward Island

Geography
- Location: 115 Deacon Grove Lane, Charlottetown, Prince Edward Island, Canada
- Coordinates: 46.2565°N 63.0933°W

Organization
- Type: Psychiatric

Services
- Beds: 75

History
- Founded: 1879

Links
- Website: Hillsborough Hospital
- Lists: Hospitals in Canada

The Hillsborough Hospital is a psychiatric hospital in Charlottetown, Prince Edward Island. It is the province's only mental health facility.

Operated by Health PEI, the Hillsborough Hospital is a 75-bed facility providing 24 hr/day, 7 day/week medical services for individuals who are facing acute or enduring mental illnesses.

== Mission ==
As the provincial in-patient psychiatric facility, Hillsborough Hospital's mission is to offer specialized acute and long-term treatment and rehabilitation to the people of Prince Edward Island who have enduring mental illness, persons with mental handicaps and psycho-geriatric patients. In addition the hospital provides day services to former patients.

== Services ==
The major specialized services offered include:

- assessment/admission/acute and sub-acute treatment and management
- behavioural management
- rehabilitation/life skills
- domiciliary nursing assessments
- psycho-geriatric services.

The Hillsborough Hospital kitchen also helps provide the 17,000 meals delivered by Meals on Wheels each year.

== History ==
The Prince Edward Island Hospital for the Insane was established in December 1879 on the present location of the Hillsborough Hospital. This property was known as Falconwood Farm and comprised 120 acres (0.49 km^{2}) of land along the Hillsborough River northeast of Charlottetown. It succeeded a facility for the care of the mentally ill which had been built in 1845 at Brighton Shore and had doubled in service as a Poor House.

In 1907 the Provincial Infirmary was built on the west end of the facility and this part of the building became part of the Prince Edward Island Hospital for the Insane when the Provincial Infirmary moved to the original Prince Edward Island Hospital site on Kensington Road in 1933. The name of the facility changed to Falconwood Hospital in 1911 and the building was reconstructed in 1933-34 following a disastrous fire in 1931 which took the lives of 8 patients.

In 1957 the facility was renamed Riverside Hospital when a central section of the building was completed and connected by tunnels to east and west wings. The Active Treatment Centre was named Hillsborough General Hospital.

In the 1970s the entire facility was renamed Hillsborough Hospital. The Riverside Home for Special Care is located in an adjacent facility.

In 1982 the Queen Elizabeth Hospital was opened on an adjacent property.
