= Victoria Park, Charlottetown =

Park in Charlottetown, Prince Edward Island, Canada

Victoria Park
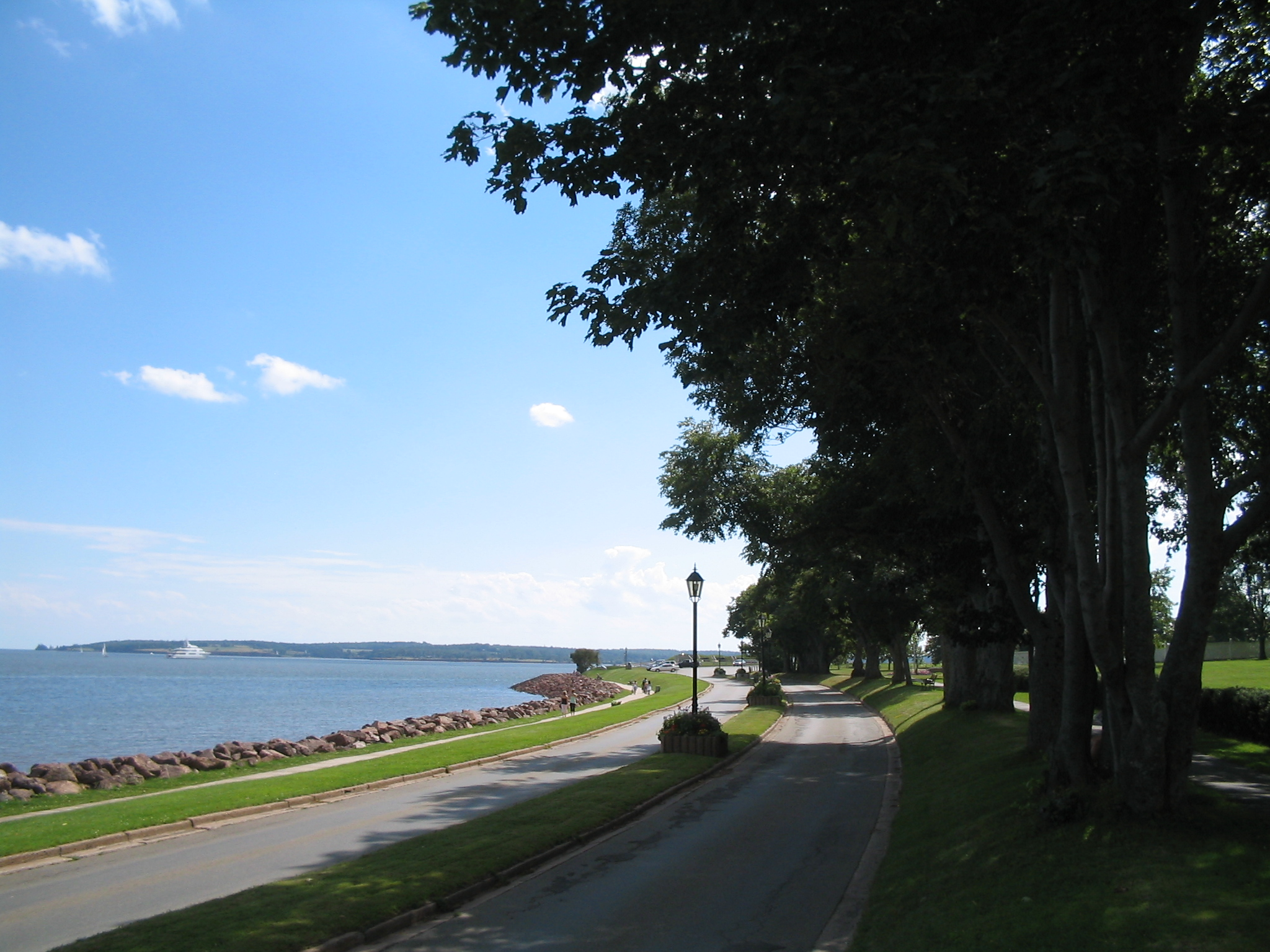
- View of Charlottetown Harbour from Victoria Park.

- Location within Prince Edward Island
- Type: Public park
- Location: Charlottetown, Prince Edward Island
- Coordinates: 46°13′47″N 63°8′24″W
- Area: 25.5 hectares (63 acres)
- Created: 1873
- Operator: City of Charlottetown, Parks and Recreation Department

Victoria Park is a waterfront park in the city of Charlottetown, Prince Edward Island, Canada.

== History ==
The property containing Victoria Park was established in 1789 by Governor Edmund Fanning as a 100-acre (40 ha) parcel for the use of the colonial administrator for St. John's Island (renamed Prince Edward Island in 1799). This property located immediately west of Charlottetown's original "500 lots" was roughly eight times larger than the thirty-six 12-acre (4.9 ha) "estates" established in the northern part of the Queens Royalty. It was envisioned that the property would be used to provide farmland for the governor and a site for an official residence.

The shore frontage of the park measures approximately 1.5 km (0.93 mi) and has several prominent features: at the east boundary, a cove which is the discharge point for Spring Park Brook which was mostly buried in the late 19th to mid-20th centuries as part of stormwater management plans for development north and east of the park; in the middle, Battery Point (also called Old Battery Point); and in the southwest, Duchess Point. Battery Point and Duchess Point are approximately 0.5 km (0.31 mi) apart.

Prior to the War of 1812, the Prince Edward Battery was established as a fortification at Battery Point facing the main shipping channel into Charlottetown Harbour. This fortification was manned by British Army regulars, as well as colonial militia until the mid-19th century. In the 1850s the colonial government constructed a quarantine station for sailors at Duchess Point but this was replaced by a facility in Keppoch at the harbour entrance within a decade.

In 1809 an Act of the Legislative Assembly was passed to establish a meridional line for surveyors in the colony. In 1820, three commissioners reported to Governor Charles Douglass Smith their calculations of magnetic declination and placed stone markers to this effect in a field cleared immediately north of the Prince Edward Battery. In 1846 additional markers were placed at right angles to the meridional lines (by a subsequent Act of the Legislative Assembly). These survey stones remain in the park to this day.

The property came to be known as the Governor's Bank in reference to a "land bank" but this was soon nicknamed by locals as Fanning's Bank in reference to Governor Edmund Fanning. The nickname was eventually shortened to Fanning Bank which remains in use to this day. In 1826, a farm house and barns were built on the property and in 1832, a tender was called for constructing a residence to house the colonial administrator. This residence which opened in December 1834 is officially named Government House and remains in use as the official residence of the Lieutenant governor of Prince Edward Island.

Pressure began to build for public access to the property and in 1869, the colonial government of the day stated that 30 acres (12 ha) of land was "quite sufficient for Government House" and that the remainder 40 acres (16 ha) should be procured for the public "as a place of retreat from the heat, filth and dust of the city".

On June 14, 1873, only 16 days before the colony became a province of Canada, Governor William Cleaver Francis Robinson vested responsibility of the 40 acres (16 ha) Government House Farm, also known as the Fanning Bank Farm, to the City of Charlottetown "to and for the use of all her Majesty's subjects as a park, promenade and pleasure ground. On no condition may it be used for circuses, shows or exhibitions of any kind..."

Shortly after this proclamation, the name Victoria Park was assigned in honour of Her Majesty Queen Victoria.

British military forces left Canada in 1905 and in that year the 16 acres (6.5 ha) property containing the Prince Edward Battery and a field adjacent to Government House were given to the City of Charlottetown to add to Victoria Park.

Following its transfer of ownership in 1873, the City of Charlottetown began making improvements to Victoria Park, including planting trees, removing stumps, constructing bath houses, and dredging Dead Man's Pond. In 1896 a roadway was built along the shore in front of Government House from Government Pond to the Prince Edward Battery; this occurred only after a legal struggle between the Lieutenant-Governor of the day and the city. The road, now the eastern part of the Victoria Park Roadway, was opened in 1897 for Queen Victoria's Diamond Jubilee. In 1903 the western part of the Victoria Park Roadway was constructed from the Prince Edward Battery west toward Duchess Point and then north along the shoreline to Brighton Road. The entire Victoria Park Roadway was surfaced with gravel in 1925.

== Development pressures ==
The park has experienced tremendous development pressures during the 20th century:

- In 1934, the northern portion of the adjoining Government House property (along the eastern boundary of the park) was secured for the Prince Edward Island Hospital.
- A "caretaker's cottage" was built in the early part of the 20th century to house a park warden, typically a military veteran. It is presently used as a pottery studio.
- On September 20, 1947, a baseball field and running track named "Memorial Field" was dedicated in honour of Prince Edward Island athletes who sacrificed their lives in World War I and World War II.
- A service road, named the Victoria Park Driveway, was constructed at this time to access the baseball field from Brighton Road, continuing south to the Prince Edward Battery, bisecting the park.
- In 1955 an ice cream parlour was constructed and operated as a fundraising enterprise for the non-profit Kiwanis Club.
- Tennis courts and a clubhouse were constructed near the ice cream parlour off the Victoria Park Driveway west of the Prince Edward Battery.
- A public swimming pool was built in the 1950s at the northwest corner of the park near Brighton Road.
- Two softball fields were built on the east side of the Victoria Park Driveway opposite Memorial Field during the 1970s-1980s.
- A playground was established in the 1970s near the swimming pool.
- A skate park was constructed between Memorial Field and the swimming pool/playground in the early 2000s.
- Additional tennis courts were constructed in 2008 in preparation for Prince Edward Island to host the 2009 Canada Games. Memorial Field was upgraded at this time.
- The Canada Day fireworks displays and associated public celebrations were held at the park near Fort Edward until being moved to Confederation Landing Park in the mid-1990s. The Canada Day fireworks returned to Victoria Park in 2011.
- A for-profit children's winter carnival was held in the park during the early 2000s before moving elsewhere. This was moved after being found to be in violation of the park's founding charter.
- The playground was dramatically increased in size in 2018 with construction of a play structure funded by the Canadian Tire Jumpstart program.
- In 2019 the abandoned Prince Edward Island Hospital was demolished and the area returned to green space. The provincial government has since announced that it will be transferred to the City of Charlottetown to be added to Victoria Park.
