= Charlottetown Hospital =

- Location in Prince Edward Island

Geography
- Location: Charlottetown, Prince Edward Island, Canada
- Coordinates: 46.2308°N 63.1292°W

Organization
- Type: Acute care

History
- Founded: 1879
- Closed: 1982

Links
- Lists: Hospitals in Canada

The Charlottetown Hospital is a former acute care hospital that was located in Charlottetown, Prince Edward Island. Established in 1879 it was the first public hospital established in the province.

== History ==
=== Establishment ===
The facility was established in 1879 under the leadership of Bishop McIntyre of the Roman Catholic Diocese of Charlottetown. It was the first hospital in Charlottetown and was established in the former Bishop's Residence on the site of the present-day St. Dunstan's Basilica at the corner of Dorchester and Great George streets. A large annex was constructed in 1882 and the hospital was open to people of any religious background.

=== New facilities ===
The increased use of the Charlottetown Hospital saw it outgrow its original building on Great George Street. In 1902, the Diocese of Charlottetown moved the hospital to larger quarters on Haviland Street in the west end of the city. A new maternity department opened in 1918 and the Charlottetown Hospital School of Nursing was established in 1920.

The Charlottetown Hospital was administered by the Order of Sisters of Charity of the Hôpital Général of Montreal from its establishment in 1879–1925. The Sisters of Saint Martha of Charlottetown, Prince Edward Island took over the administration of the Charlottetown Hospital and St. Vincent's Orphanage, another Diocese of Charlottetown responsibility.

In 1925 the Charlottetown Hospital moved into a new brick building on Haviland Street and the original wood building was converted into a nursing home which was staffed by the Sisters of St. Martha and named "Sacred Heart Home".

The Diocese of Charlottetown was involved in one final health care project in Prince Edward Island when it opened the Western Hospital in Alberton in 1944, also under the administration of the Sisters of St. Martha.

The Charlottetown Diocese undertook a major fundraising campaign during the late 1940s and early 1950s to finance major interior renovations to the Charlottetown Hospital, resulting in the construction of a new wing.

=== Government operation ===
In 1969 the provincial government took over the operation of health care facilities from the Diocese of Charlottetown as part of the provincial development plan under premier Alex Campbell. The Prince Edward Island Hospital and the Charlottetown Hospital were identified for replacement with a single modern facility.

=== Closure ===
In 1982, after 102 years of service, the Charlottetown Hospital closed its doors when the Queen Elizabeth Hospital opened.

The opening of the Queen Elizabeth Hospital in 1982 also saw the end of abortion services in the province, which had been provided at the Prince Edward Island Hospital since the late 1960s. One of the conditions that the Roman Catholic Church placed on the provincial government of Premier James Lee for merging the Catholic-affiliated Charlottetown Hospital with the secular and publicly operated Prince Edward Island Hospital into the new Queen Elizabeth Hospital was that all abortion services in the province be discontinued.

The building on Haviland Street remained standing into the mid-1990s as it was re-purposed for provincial government offices, including motor vehicle licensing and driver testing under the Department of Transportation and Public Works.

The Charlottetown Hospital School of Nursing was merged with other nursing schools in the province in 1969 to form the Prince Edward Island School of Nursing. This education facility closed in 1994 when its diploma programs transferred to the bachelor program at the University of Prince Edward Island. In 1995, the provincial government funded the conversion of the waterfront building housing the Charlottetown Hospital School of Nursing into a new Holland College campus called the Tourism and Culinary Centre, which houses a variety of management programs in the tourism and hospitality sector as well as the Culinary Institute of Canada. As part of the expansion of the new Holland College facility, the former Charlottetown Hospital building was demolished to make room for a parking lot.

The adjoining Sacred Heart Home had been moved into a new brick structure during the 1950s.. It was closed by the Sisters of St. Martha of Prince Edward Island and was subsequently sold to a private developer and renovated into a senior citizen apartment complex.
