= Northwest Territories Business Development and Investment Corporation =

Prosper NWT
- Type: Crown corporation, financial services
- Industry: Financial services, consulting, venture capital
- Founded: Yellowknife, Northwest Territories, Canada, 2005
- Headquarters: Yellowknife, Northwest Territories, Canada
- Key people: Joyce Taylor (CEO), Marie-Soleil Lacoursiere (Chairperson)
- Total assets: $16.2 million (F2012)
- Number of employees: 18 (A2025)

Prosper NWT (formerly the Business Development and Investment Corporation, or BDIC) is a Crown corporation of the Government of the Northwest Territories (GNWT) that supports economic development across the Northwest Territories (NWT), Canada. Prosper NWT works to foster a diverse and sustainable economy through flexible programs and partnerships that support entrepreneurs, businesses, and community economic development organizations.

== History ==
Prosper NWT was originally established as the BDIC in 2005, it was established pursuant to the Northwest Territories Business Development and Investment Corporation Act.

In 2024, the organization was renamed to Prosper NWT to better reflect its evolving role and focus on inclusive economic development in the territory.

== Services ==
Prosper NWT delivers a wide range of services and programs to support business development and economic diversification across the Northwest Territories. These include financing, advisory services, and entrepreneurial training.

=== Financing ===
Prosper NWT provides access to capital through both debt and equity options, designed to meet the needs of northern businesses at various stages of growth.

==== Term Loans ====
This is the most common type of credit facility. Under the Prosper NWT Act and its Regulations, a client may borrow up to a total of $2,000,000 for their business. Loans are structured over a fixed period, with an amortization period of up to 25 years. Rates of interest are determined based on the creditworthiness of the client and are typically set at prime rate plus 2, 3, or 4 percent.

==== Irrevocable Letter of Credit ====
Prosper NWT offers an irrevocable letter of credit so a client may secure credit from a conventional financial institution. Clients must pay a service fee for this product, based on risk.

==== Venture Investment Program ====
Prosper NWT may invest in a Northwest Territories business through the purchase of preferred shares. While Prosper NWT may seek a seat on the client’s board of directors, it rarely engages in the day-to-day operations of the business.

As profits increase, clients must pay dividends on the shares held by Prosper NWT. Clients also have the option to repurchase these shares at a mutually agreed-upon rate. The Venture Investment Program is currently being redesigned to better meet the needs of northern innovators.

=== Business Support Services ===
Prosper NWT also provides a range of non-financial supports to help businesses grow and succeed.

- Startup and Expansion Support: Resources and advisory services for entrepreneurs at all stages of development
- Business Planning and Guidance: Assistance with creating business plans, marketing strategies, and operational decision-making
- Entrepreneurial Resources: Targeted support for youth, Indigenous entrepreneurs, and community-based business development
- Workshops and Seminars: Through partnerships with several organizations, Prosper NWT delivers educational seminars and video conference sessions for entrepreneurs across the territory.

=== Subsidiaries ===
The BDIC owns a number of subsidiary companies. These subsidiaries create economic activity and employment in smaller NWT communities.

== Corporate Governance ==
Prosper NWT operates under the authority of the Prosper NWT Act and reports to the Legislative Assembly through the Minister Responsible. It is governed by a Board of Directors appointed by the Minister, ensuring alignment with GNWT priorities while maintaining operational independence.
