= Health PEI =

- Company type: Health Care
- Founded: July 6, 2010
- Founder: Government of Prince Edward Island
- Headquarters: Charlottetown, Prince Edward Island
- Area served: Prince Edward Island
- Key people: Diane Griffin, Chairperson of the Board of Directors; Melanie Fraser, Chief Executive Officer
- Number of employees: 3,730 (2012)
- Website: www.healthpei.ca

Health PEI is the single health authority for the Canadian province of Prince Edward Island. It delivers medical care on behalf of the Government of Prince Edward Island's Department of Health and Wellness and is governed by a board of directors appointed by the Minister of Health and Wellness.

Health PEI is headquartered in Charlottetown, Prince Edward Island and operates hospitals, health centres, and nursing home facilities throughout the province while providing a variety of programs and services.

== History ==
Health PEI was established by the provincial government following Royal Assent of the Health Services Act on April 1, 2010. Health PEI began operations on July 6, 2010 with the transfer of all operational health care services from the Department of Health and Wellness. An earlier November 8, 2005 reorganization by the provincial government saw the following health authorities dissolved and transferred to the then-named Department of Health: East Prince Health Region; West Prince Health Region; Kings Health Region; and Queens Health Region.

== Board of directors ==
Health PEI is governed by a 9-member competency-based board of directors appointed by the Minister of Health and Wellness. The board meets monthly at locations throughout the province, while committees and task groups meet regularly between board meetings. Board members are Diane Griffin (chair); Peter MacDonald (vice chair); Dr. Richard Wedge; Helen Flynn; Colleen Parker; Megan Cheverie; Selvi Roy; Dr. William Montelpare and Jennifer Evans. As part of their role in managing the affairs of Health PEI, they employ the chief executive officer. Board committees are: Quality and Safety, Audit, Risk & Planning and Human Resources.

== 'One Island Health System' ==
Following the release of a 2008 report by Corpus Sanchez International titled "A Call to Action: A Plan for Change", work began to integrate Prince Edward Island's health services. Initiatives were begun such as:

- increasing access to primary care (family physicians offices, walk-in clinics, community mental health), intended to encourage prevention and ease pressures on the system by reducing emergency department visits and unplanned hospitalizations;
- collaborative model of care, a realignment of staff to areas where they are needed the most;
- electronic health records, which provide an electronic record of every Islander's health history and care to caregivers when and when they need it.

== Facilities ==
Health PEI operates the following facilities:

- Queen Elizabeth Hospital (Charlottetown, PE)
- Prince County Hospital (Summerside, PE)
- Hillsborough Hospital (Charlottetown, PE)
- Souris Hospital (Souris, PE)
- Kings County Memorial Hospital (Montague, PE)
- Community Hospital O'Leary (O'Leary, PE)
- Western Hospital (Alberton, PE)

== Quick facts ==
- Health PEI serves the entire province of Prince Edward Island.
- Annual budget approximately $560.8 million (2013–14)
- Approximately 3,700 staff and physicians
- Over 27 facilities, clinics and offices
- 7 hospital foundations, which operate independently of Health PEI (Eastern Kings Health Foundation, Kings County Memorial Hospital Foundation, Queen Elizabeth Hospital Foundation, Prince County Hospital Foundation, Stewart Memorial Hospital Foundation, Western Hospital Foundation, O'Leary Community Health Foundation)

== Statistics (2011–2012) ==
Primary care

- Visits to health centres: 113,039
- Admissions to addiction programs: 3,150
- Referrals to community mental health: 5,004
- Referrals to provincial diabetes programs: 1,683
- Breast feeding rate: 68 percent
- Immunization rate (2 yrs old): 84 percent

Hospital care

- Emergency-department visits: 100,631
- Admissions: 15,783
- Inpatient days: 141,582
- Average length of stay: 8.7 days
- Surgeries (acute care): 3,824
- Surgeries (day): 6,665

Long-term care

- Facilities (public): 9
- Beds (public): 572
- Admissions: 225
- Average length of stay: 2.5 years

Home care

- Admissions: 4,536
- Clients over age 75: 2,719
