= Ontario Agricorp =

Ontario agricultural agency

Ontario AgriCorp is a Crown agency of the government of Ontario that delivers risk management programs and other services to Ontario's agriculture industry.

== History ==
AgriCorp was created as a provincial crown corporation in 1997 under the authority of the AgriCorp Act, 1996 (S.O. 1996, CHAPTER 17, Schedule A) with the object of administering crop insurance under the Crop Insurance Act (Ontario), 1996. Specifically, Agricorp was given the capacity and powers to establish and collect fees and service charges related to the exercise of its powers or the carrying out of its duties; establish and collect penalties for the late payment of the fees and service charges; and lend money between funds.

AgriCorp currently delivers three core programs, AgriStability, Production Insurance (PI) and the suite of risk management programs (RMPs), as well as several other smaller programs (e.g., Farm Business Registration). Agricorp is governed by a board of directors appointed by the Lieutenant governor in Council.

In June 2002, the government of Canada and the government of Ontario agreed on the Agricultural Policy Framework (APF) to focus agriculture and Agrifood movement into the 21st century. This agreement solidified the commitment of these governments to work together on developing and adjusting programs, services, and tools to help producers succeed today and tomorrow. It also identified the common goals they will pursue over the next five years.

Under the APF, effective from April 2003 to March 2008, the new Canadian Agricultural Income Stabilization (CAIS) program was launched. CAIS combined the stabilization assistance of the Net Income Stabilization Accounts (NISA) program and the disaster assistance provided under the Ontario Farm Income Disaster Program (OFIDP) into one program. In December 2004, delivery of the CAIS program was transferred from OMAF to Agricorp.

At their annual meeting in Quebec City in July 2008, federal, provincial and territorial ministers announced the completion of the Growing Forward framework, which replaced the (APF).

Under Growing Forward, the CAIS program was replaced by two new programs: AgriStability, delivered by Agricorp in Ontario, and AgriInvest, delivered by Agriculture and Agri-Food Canada. In 2013, Growing Forward was replaced by a new five-year agreement, Growing Forward 2, in effect until 2018.

== Work Force ==
AgriCorp employs over 350 staff working at the two Guelph offices (1 Stone Rd. West and Massey Rd.), Stratford and satellite offices across the province. Administrative costs are split between the federal and provincial governments and are documented in the agency's annual reports, which are available on its website.
