= Saskatchewan Housing Corporation =

- Company type: Crown Corporation
- Industry: Housing
- Founded: 1978
- Headquarters: 1920 Broad Street; 11th Floor; Regina, Saskatchewan; S4P 3V6
- Products: Housing
- Website: www.socialservices.gov.sk.ca/housing

Saskatchewan Housing Corporation (SHC) is a crown corporation owned by the Government of Saskatchewan, founded in 1978, to fund social housing, provide grants and other incentives for low-income and rental housing development within the province. In 2010, SHC supported 23,500 social and affordable rental housing units and an addition 5,400 special-purpose housing (e.g. group homes and special needs) units. The corporation primarily executes its mandate by funding programs and initiatives undertaken by 450 local community organizations, mostly local municipal housing authorities. Corporation staffing functions are primarily provided by the Ministry of Social Services under contract to the corporation.

In response to increased population growth, SHC developed a new strategic plan to increase market rental housing in the province and enhance home ownership for low-income families.
