= Great Lakes Pilotage Authority =

Canadian Crown Corporation agency

- Company type: Crown corporation
- Industry: Maritime transport
- Headquarters: Cornwall, Ontario, Canada
- Area served: All Canadian waters in and around the provinces of Ontario, Manitoba, and Quebec south of the Saint-Lambert Lock
- Key people: Jean Aubry-Morin (CEO)
- Services: Pilotage
- Revenue: ▲CA$50.9 million (2024)
- Net income: ▼CA$0.9 million (2024)
- Owner: Government of Canada
- Number of employees: 106 (2024)
- Website: glpa-apgl.com

The Great Lakes Pilotage Authority (French: Administration de pilotage des Grands Lacs) is a Crown corporation of the Government of Canada, which was established as a result of recommendations made by the Royal Commission on Pilotage in Canada, by the Pilotage Act in February 1972. Initially incorporated as a limited company in May 1972, it became an independent Crown corporation in 1998. The corporation is responsible for pilotage through Canadian waters in Manitoba and Ontario, as well as waters in Quebec south of the Saint-Lambert Lock. In international waters (predominantly the Great Lakes and the Saint Lawrence Seaway), pilotage is a shared responsibility between the Great Lakes Pilotage Authority and American pilot associations.

In 2017, the pilotage authority was the subject of a special examination by the Auditor General of Canada.
