= Island Waste Management Corporation =

- Company type: Crown corporation
- Industry: Waste management
- Headquarters: Charlottetown, Prince Edward Island, Canada
- Area served: Prince Edward Island
- Services: Collection and disposal of solid waste
- Owner: Government of Prince Edward Island
- Website: iwmc.pe.ca

The Island Waste Management Corporation (IWMC) is a Canadian provincial Crown corporation operated by the Government of Prince Edward Island.

Headquartered in Charlottetown, IWMC is responsible for collecting and disposing of solid waste in the entire province.

Faced with ever-increasing amounts of solid waste heading to antiquated, poorly designed community landfills across the province during the 1980s, the provincial government conceived its Waste Watch program in the early 1990s with the eventual goal being to standardize the collection and disposal of waste, while closing all small community landfills. IWMC was established to administer and provide solid waste management services throughout the province. The company sub-contracts the collection and disposal services and collects an annual fee for its operations through provincial property taxes for both residential and commercial properties.

== Waste Watch ==
IWMC operates and maintains the Waste Watch program, a 3-stream source separation based waste management system implemented across the entire province.

Implementation of the program began in Prince County, eventually being expanded by the late 1990s and early 2000s to the entire province once adequate waste handling facilities were constructed.

IWMC provides every property owner and tenant in the province with 2 standardized carts (there are 3 sizes available) - 1 black cart for non-recyclable and non-compostable material, and 1 green cart for compostable material. Each rugged wheeled plastic cart has an identification number assigned to each property or tenant with GPS-enabled tracking chips embedded into the plastic to enable tracking should a cart go missing. Waste disposal fees are collected through province-wide property tax assessments and provide IWMC with revenue to operate its collection and disposal programs.

In addition to the green compost and black waste bins, all recyclables must be source separated by property owners and placed in clear plastic recycling bags.

IWMC has contracted Superior Sanitation, a Charlottetown-based waste hauling company, to provide all waste collection services with a fleet of waste collection vehicles.

IWMC has contracted ADI Engineering, a Fredericton, New Brunswick-based engineering and consulting firm, to operate its central composting plant.

Waste collected in black bins which is safe for incineration is incinerated at the Tri-Gen energy-from-waste plant in Charlottetown and ashes are buried in a modern landfill outside Charlottetown.

Construction and demolition debris is collected and hauled by approved contractors who dispose of the material in approved pits, pending removal of recyclable material. IWMC's Waste Watch program does not currently have the ability to handle e-waste.

Since the introduction of Waste Watch, Prince Edward Island has become a leader among Canadian provinces in the source separation of waste and diversion of waste from landfills, largely explained by the province's small geography which is comparable to many large counties and municipalities.

Compost from biodegradable waste collection is sold to garden supply distribution chains and recyclables are sold to recycling firms in central Canada and the northeastern United States.

The Waste Watch program is mandatory and property owners or tenants who refuse to separate waste do not have it collected (or in some extreme cases are fined).

The complete Waste Watch program has been in operation since July 1, 2002 and the recycling program has been in use since July 1, 2000. The Waste Watch program has diverted 64-66% of the Island's waste to either compost or recycling.

== Waste Watch separation rules ==
1. Waste: includes anything that cannot be composted or recycled (e.g.: #6 and #7 plastic).
2. Compost: includes anything from the ground. Any human waste, any food scraps, any wet paper/cardboard, plant matter. e.g.: toenail clippings, leftover food scraps, grass, plants, leaves.
3. Recycling #1: any paper products (e.g.: newsprint, looseleaf.
4. Recycling #2: any plastic products or metals (including tin and aluminium). On the bottom of most bottles and plastic containers is a number code surrounded by a recycling emblem, ranging from 1–7, permitting these plastic items to be recyclable.*

^{*}For more than two decades, carbonated beverages in PEI were sold in reusable glass bottles redeemable at local grocery and convenience stores. Canned beer was banned in 1976 but the ban was lifted in May 2008.
