= Forestry Innovation Investment =

Forestry Innovation Investment Ltd.
- Type: Crown Corporation
- Industry: Forestry
- Founded: March 2003
- Headquarters: Vancouver
- Area served: BC
- Key people: Michael Loseth, President and CEO
- Services: Marketing, Research
- Website: www.bcfii.ca

Forestry Innovation Investment Ltd. (FII) is British Columbia's market development agency for forest products.

As a Crown corporation of the B.C. government, FII helps to develop and diversify markets for B.C. forest products to ensure the forest sector continues to be a key contributor to the provincial economy. It operates out of offices in Vancouver, with subsidiary offices in China, the United Kingdom, India and Vietnam.

== Programs ==
- Market Initiatives
- Market Outreach
- Wood First

== Market Initiatives ==
The Market Initiatives program leads the development of export markets and new market segments. This helps to diversify the sector, reduce market risk and open new opportunities in higher-value segments of the forest economy.

== Market Outreach ==
The Market Outreach program positions wood as an environmentally responsible, preferred building material and highlights B.C. as a reliable supplier of quality products from sustainably managed forests. By providing credible, fact-based information, FII ensures that audiences in B.C. and globally understand that using wood from B.C.’s sustainably managed forests can help to address climate change and advance low-carbon innovation.

== Wood First ==
The Wood First program works with B.C.’s manufacturing, education, training, design and construction industries as well as government to advance wood construction technologies and expertise in B.C. FII then leverages this leadership to promote B.C. internationally as a leading source of technology, products and expertise for the use of wood in construction, interior design and daily living.

== Governance ==
FII is governed by a Board of Directors that is accountable to the BC Ministry of Forests (FOR).

The Government appoints the Board to set operational policy for the organization and, in cooperation with senior management, to set strategic direction. The Board also monitors FII’s performance based on the Province’s planning and reporting principles. The Minister provides annual direction to the Board through issuing a mandate letter.

The Board is responsible for appointing the President & Chief Executive Officer (CEO) and delegates responsibility to the President & CEO for the day-to-day leadership and management of the organization.

FII operates out of offices in Vancouver, with subsidiary offices in China, the United Kingdom, India and Vietnam.
