= BC Pension Corporation =

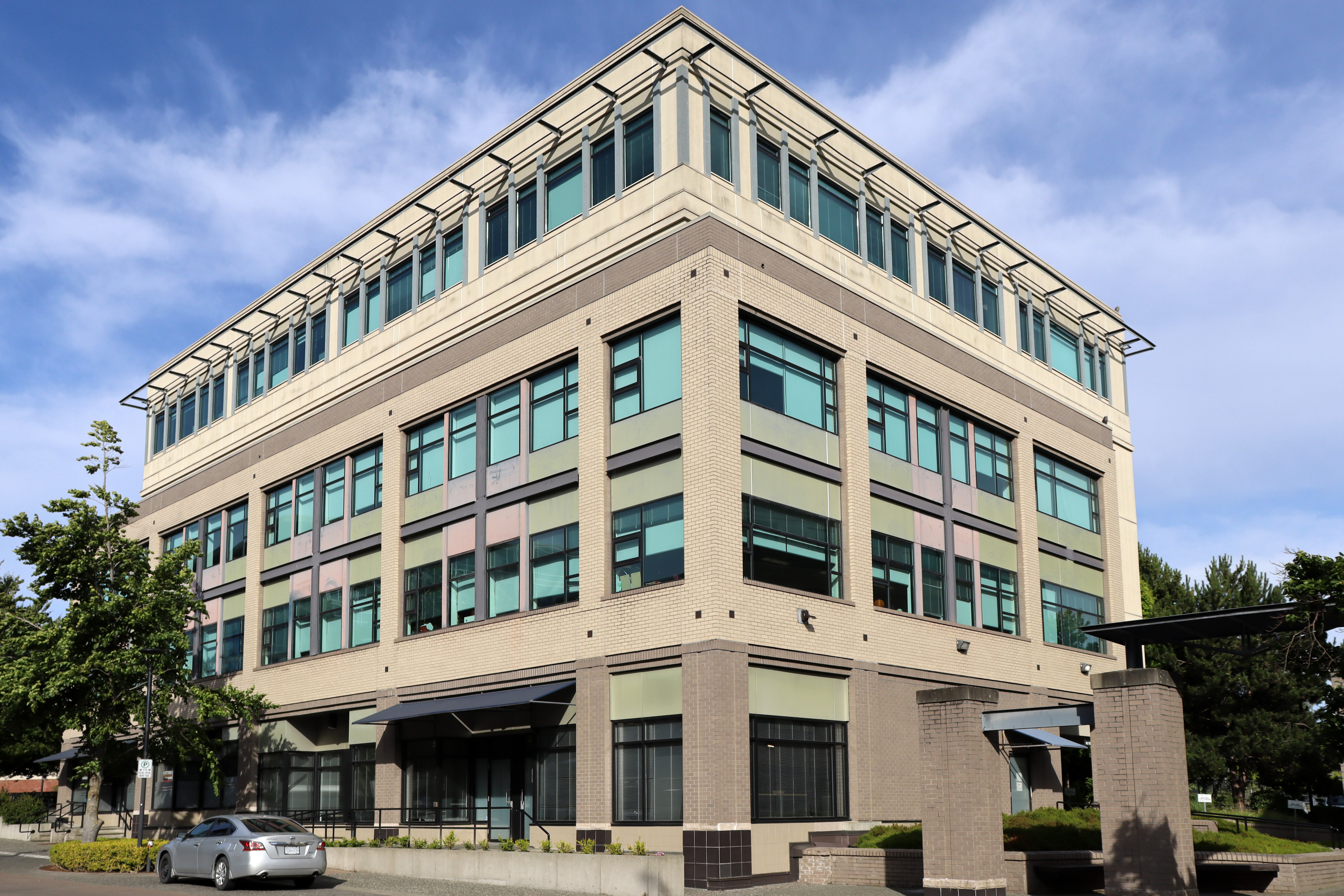
- Industry: pension system
- Founded: 2000
- Headquarters: 2995 Jutland Road; Victoria, British Columbia; V8T 5J9
- Key people: Laura Nashman (CEO) (2008-present); Trevor Fedyna (CFO); Joel Levinson (VP); Aaron Walker-Duncan (VP)
- Website: Official website

BC Pension Corporation is one of the largest pension plan administrative agents in Canada with assets in excess of CA$123.6 billion. Created in 2000 with the passage of the Public Sector Pension Plans Act, the corporation provides pension administration services on behalf of British Columbia's College, Municipal, Public Service, Teachers', and WorkSafeBC pension plans for each of their plan members and employers.

The corporation collects contributions, processes benefits and issues pension payments, and provides policy, financial and communication services for the five respective boards of trustees. Collectively, the corporation serves approximately 560,000 plan members and 1,100 plan employers as of April 27, 2020, and pays out more than CA$349 million in benefits each month (CA$4.2 billion a year) to over 181,000 retirees. Laura Nashman is the current chief executive officer of the corporation, beginning in December 2008. Ms Nashman succeeded Gail Stephens who left the corporation in March 2008.

== Leadership ==
=== Board of directors ===
- Geraldine Hutchings: Chair, appointed to the Board in 2018. Member of the College Pension Board of Trustees since March 2012. Legal counsel for the Aboriginal Law and Litigation Group within the Ministry of the Attorney General.
- Elizabeth Baverstock: Vice Chair, appointed to the Board in 2019. Member of the Teachers’ Pension Board of Trustees since January 2018. President of the Richmond Teachers' Association.
- Weldon Cowan: Member, appointed to the Board in 2011. Member of the College Pension Board of Trustees since September 2005. Staff representative for the Federation of Post-Secondary Educators of BC.
- Philip Twyford: Member. Assistant Deputy Minister and Executive Financial Officer for the Ministry of Health.
- Gary Yee: Member, appointed to the Board in 2015. Member of the Municipal Pension Board of Trustees since January 2014. Pension coordinator and airline coordinator in British Columbia for the Canadian Union of Public Employees.
- Brad Underwood: Member, appointed to the Board in 2018. Member of the Teachers' Pension Board of Trustees. Director of pensions for the Public Sector Employers’ Council Secretariat.
- David Vipond: Member. Member of the Public Service Pension Board of Trustees since 2001. Vice chair of the Public Service Pension Board of Trustees.
- Chan-Seng Lee: Member, appointed to the Board in 2018. Member of the Public Service Pension Board of Trustees since December 2010. Vice president for finance and administration with Partnerships British Columbia Inc.
