= Department of Economic Development, Innovation and Trade =

Government department of PEI, Canada

- ministère du Développement économique, de l’Innovation et du Commerce

Department overview
- Formed: 2023; 2 years ago
- Jurisdiction: Prince Edward Island
- Minister responsible: Darlene Compton
- Deputy Minister responsible: Stefanie Corbett

The Department of Economic Development, Innovation and Trade (EDIT) (French: ministère du Développement économique, de l’Innovation et du Commerce) is the department of the Government of Prince Edward Island responsible for working to advance a healthy and sustainable Island economy through strategic sector growth, economic expansion and various social enterprise initiatives.

The minister of Economic Development, Innovation and Trade (currently Darlene Compton) is responsible for the department to the General Assembly. While the minister is head of the department, and provides policy/political direction, the day-to-day operations of the department are managed by the deputy minister (currently Stefanie Corbett), who is a public servant.

== History ==
The Department of Economic Development, Innovation and Trade was created out of the responsibilities of other departments in 2023.

== Agencies, Boards and Commissions ==
- Canadian Free Trade Agreement (CFTA): Compliance Panel and Appellate Panel Rosters
- Canadian Free Trade Agreement: Electricity Transmission Services Roster Panel
- Innovation PEI Board of Directors
- Innovation PEI
- Finance PEI
- Lucy Maud Montgomery Foundation
- PEI Arts Guild Inc.

== Legislation ==
The Department of Economic Development, Innovation and Trade is responsible for a number of laws related to the economy, innovation and provincial investments in Prince Edward Island.

- Acadian Purchase Trust Act
- Broadband is an Essential Service Act
- Fathers of Confederation Buildings Act
- Finance PEI Act
- Innovation PEI Act
- International Interests in Mobile Aircraft Equipment Act
- Island Investment Development Act
- Lucy Maud Montgomery Foundation Act
- Maritime Economic Cooperation Act
