= Prince Edward Island Hospital =

- Location in Prince Edward Island

Geography
- Location: Charlottetown, Prince Edward Island, Canada
- Coordinates: 46.2323°N 63.1376°W

Organization
- Type: Acute care

History
- Founded: 1884
- Closed: 1982

Links
- Lists: Hospitals in Canada

The Prince Edward Island Hospital is a former acute care hospital that was located in Charlottetown, Prince Edward Island. It was the first public general hospital established in the province and the largest such facility throughout its history.

The facility was established by the provincial government on January 28, 1884, on a property known as "Haszard House" located at present-day 24-36 Longworth Avenue in the northeast part of the city. The Prince Edward Island Hospital was predated by the Charlottetown Hospital, which was established in 1879 by the Roman Catholic Diocese of Charlottetown. The city's residents demanded that the government open "a general" hospital that was not affiliated with a religious body. As such, the Prince Edward Island Hospital was frequently referred to as the "Protestant" hospital, however the facility was secular and had no affiliation with a religious denomination.

In 1891 the first nursing school in the province was opened when the Prince Edward Island Hospital School of Nursing was established.

In 1896 the trustees of the Prince Edward Island Hospital foresaw a greater need than Haszard House could provide and accepted the gift of Rev. Ralph Brecken's property at present-day 31 Kensington Road in the neighbouring then-rural community of Parkdale. Architect C.B. Chappell was commissioned to design and build the large brick building in June 1898 and it opened in March 1900.

By the 1920s it became apparent that the Kensington Road location for the hospital was becoming over-crowded, thus the provincial government built a much larger facility on the northern part of the Government House property adjacent to Victoria Park. This new building opened in 1934 at present-day 5 Brighton Road.

In 1969 the provincial government took over the operation of the Charlottetown Hospital from the Roman Catholic Church as part of the provincial development plan under premier Alex Campbell. The Prince Edward Island Hospital and the Charlottetown Hospital were identified for replacement with a single modern facility.

The Prince Edward Island Hospital School of Nursing was merged with other nursing schools in the province in 1969 to form the Prince Edward Island School of Nursing. This education facility closed in 1994 when its diploma programs transferred to the bachelor program at the University of Prince Edward Island.

In 1982, after 97 years of service, the Prince Edward Island Hospital closed its doors when the Queen Elizabeth Hospital opened.

The opening of the Queen Elizabeth Hospital in 1982 also saw the end of abortion services in the province, which had been provided at the Prince Edward Island Hospital since the late 1960s. One of the conditions that the Roman Catholic Church placed on the provincial government of Premier James Lee for merging the Catholic-affiliated Charlottetown Hospital with the secular and publicly operated Prince Edward Island Hospital into the new Queen Elizabeth Hospital was that all abortion services in the province be discontinued.

== Prince Edward Home ==
In 1982 the Prince Edward Island Hospital building at 5 Brighton Road was re-purposed by the provincial government and called the Prince Edward Home.

From 1982 to 2014 the building was used for the following health care services:

- Palliative Care
- Convalescent/Restorative Care
- Respite Care
- Long-Term Nursing Home Care for individuals over the age of 60 who do not require acute general hospital care
- Long-Term Medical Nursing Care for individuals under the age of 60 and who suffer from chronic disabilities

In November 2013 a new "provincial manor" opened in the neighbourhood of West Royalty and residents were moved to that location. A new palliative care facility which opened in 2014, has left the building at 5 Brighton Rd with no purpose in 2015 and it is expected to be decommissioned.

The adjacent building that housed the Prince Edward Island Hospital School of Nursing was re-purposed by the provincial government and currently houses offices for the Department of Education and called the Aubin Arsenault Building.
