= Queen Elizabeth Hospital (Charlottetown) =

- Health PEI
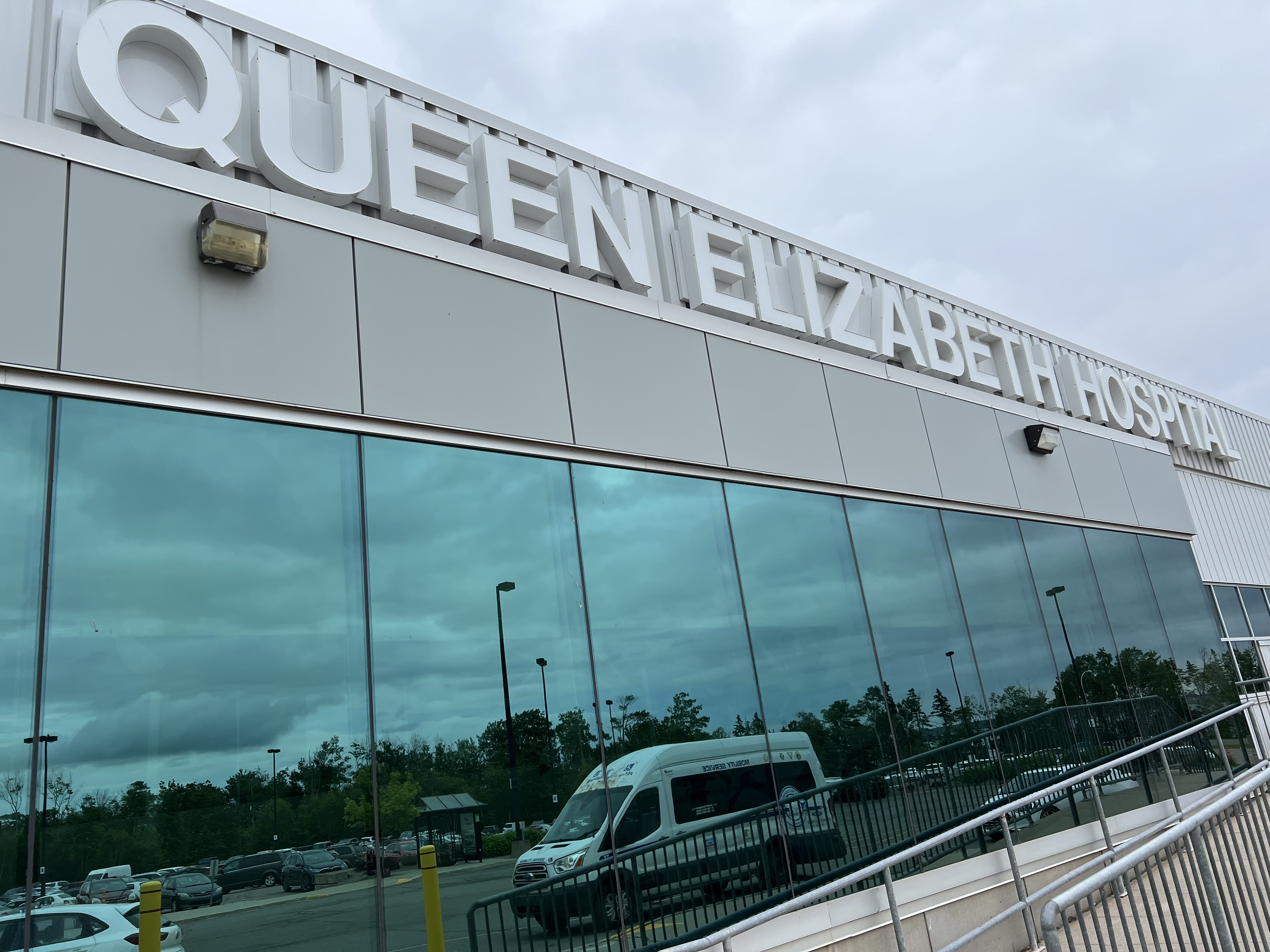
- Front of the Hospital

- Location in Prince Edward Island

Geography
- Location: 60 Riverside Drive, Charlottetown, Prince Edward Island, Canada
- Coordinates: 46.2556°N 63.1009°W

Organization
- Type: Acute care

Services
- Emergency department: Level III trauma centre
- Beds: 243

Helipads
- Helipad: TC LID: CDV3

History
- Founded: 1982

Links
- Website: Queen Elizabeth Hospital
- Lists: Hospitals in Canada

The Queen Elizabeth Hospital (QEH) is a 243-bed acute care hospital located in Charlottetown, Prince Edward Island, Canada, making it the largest hospital in the province.

Operated by Health PEI, the hospital opened in April 1982, resulting in the closure of the Charlottetown Hospital and the Prince Edward Island Hospital. It is named in honour of Queen Elizabeth II.

The QEH is located on a large forested campus originally known as Falconwood Farm in the northeast corner of the city adjoining the neighbourhoods of East Royalty, Falconwood and Sherwood, overlooking the Hillsborough River. The Hillsborough Hospital is a psychiatric hospital located on the same campus.

== Services ==
The QEH is a full-service health care facility that provides community services to residents of Queens County and is a major referral centre for specialty services for residents across Prince Edward Island.

Some of the services that the QEH offers:

- Emergency/OPD
- Ambulatory care
- Surgery/Day surgery
- ICU
- CCU
- Obstetrics
- Neonatal nursing/Neonatal ICU
- Pediatrics
- Psychiatry
- Rehabilitation
- Pathology/Laboratory
- Radiology/MRI/CT Scan/Nuclear Medicine/Mammography
- Oncology
- Polysomnography
- Respirology
- Stroke unit
- PEI Cancer Treatment Centre
- Internal Medicine/Endoscopy/Colonoscopy/Bronchoscopy
- Special services (Pulmonary Function Testing, Blood collection, ECG/EEG, Holter monitor)

== History ==
In 1999 the Prince Edward Island Cancer Treatment Centre opened a new facility at the QEH and was expanded in 2003. At around 2006, the main entrance to the QEH off Riverside Drive was upgraded and the emergency department was expanded.

The opening of the Queen Elizabeth Hospital in 1982 also saw the end of abortion services in the province, which had been provided at the Prince Edward Island Hospital since the late 1960s. One of the conditions that the Roman Catholic Church placed on the provincial government of Premier James Lee for merging the Catholic-affiliated Charlottetown Hospital with the secular and publicly operated Prince Edward Island Hospital into the new Queen Elizabeth Hospital was that all abortion services in the province be discontinued.

== See also ==
- Royal eponyms in Canada
