= Tourism in Nova Scotia =

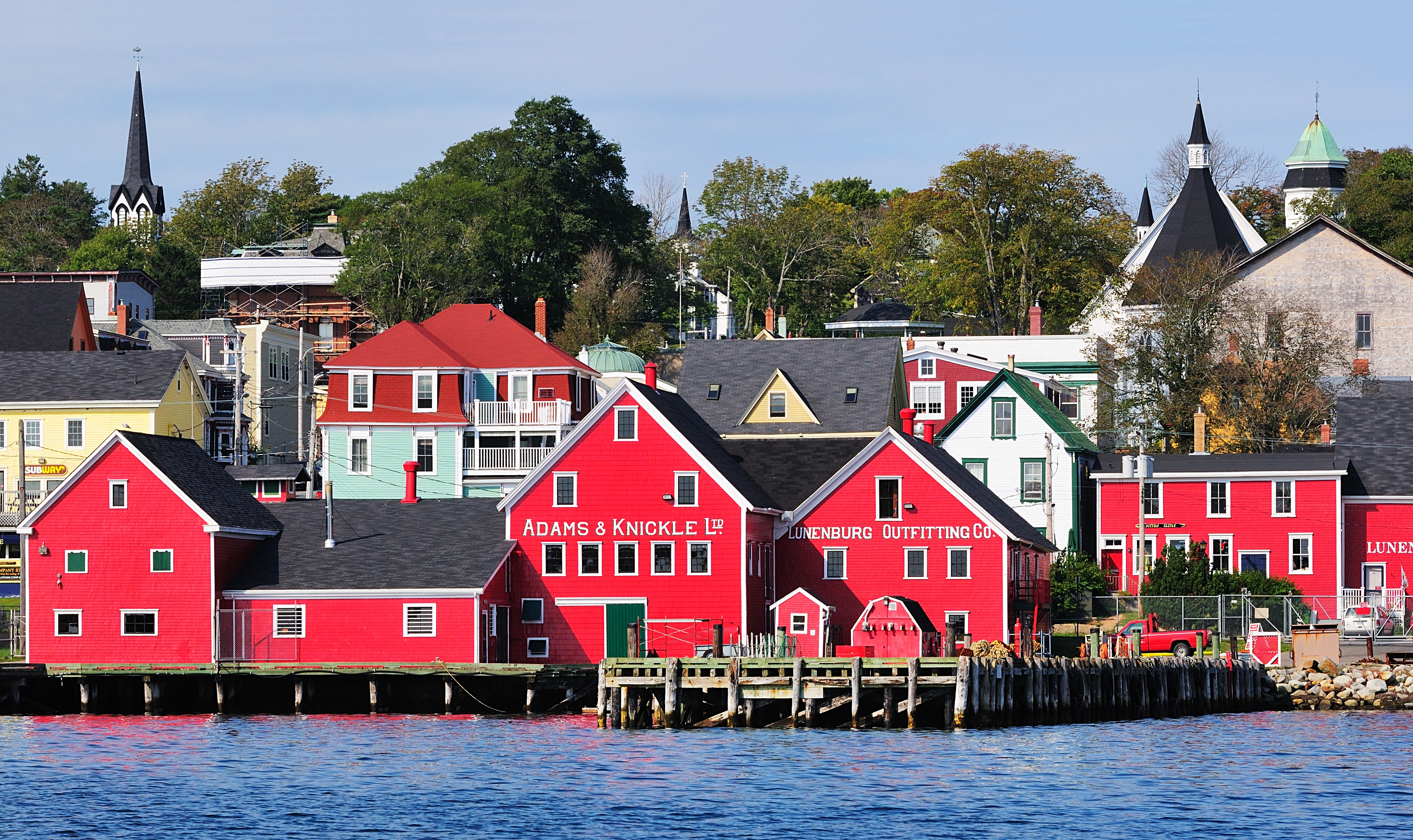
The historic district of Lunenburg is a National Historic Site of Canada and a UNESCO World Heritage Site

Nova Scotia received over 2 million visitors, generating approximately $3.5 billion in revenue in 2024. The province has two major national parks, Cape Breton Highlands National Park and Kejimkujik National Park. Nova Scotia is also home to three UNESCO World Heritage Sites. The two cultural and one natural site are the town of Lunenburg, the Grand-Pré National Historic Site, and the Joggins fossil cliffs. Nova Scotia is also famous for its numerous historical sites, museums, and natural areas. Notable among these is Fort Anne in Annapolis Royal, Canada's first National Historic Site. For the year 2024, visitation to Nova Scotia saw just over 2 million non-resident visitors. Peggy's Cove is regarded as among the most photographed sites in Canada, known for the distinctive Peggys Point Lighthouse.

Halifax, the provincial capital, has several major attractions, such as the Pier 21 museum, Citadel Hill, and the Public Gardens. The Halifax Metro Centre is home to numerous events both sport-related and otherwise, such as the Nova Scotia International Tattoo. Downtown Halifax is considered the prime tourism district in Halifax, with most historic attractions located here as well as the waterfront harbourwalk, a continuous 3 km (2 mi) stretch of boardwalk home to street vendors, entertainers, the Casino Nova Scotia, and the Maritime Museum of the Atlantic. Downtown Halifax is also the location of several major hotels, the Art Gallery of Nova Scotia and historic buildings such as Province House, the provincial legislative building; and Government House, the official residence of the Lieutenant Governor.

== Halifax ==
- Halifax Citadel - A star shaped fort with a view of Halifax Harbour, constructed in 1749 to defend the city.
- Halifax Public Gardens - First planted in 1867, they are among the few surviving Victorian era gardens of Canada.
- Maritime Museum of the Atlantic - Founded in 1948, today it contains over 30,000 artifacts, 70 small craft, and the steam ship CSS Acadia.
- Nova Scotia Museum of Natural History - First established in 1868, this museum's collection includes various historical collections and natural sciences exhibits.

== Attractions Outside Halifax ==
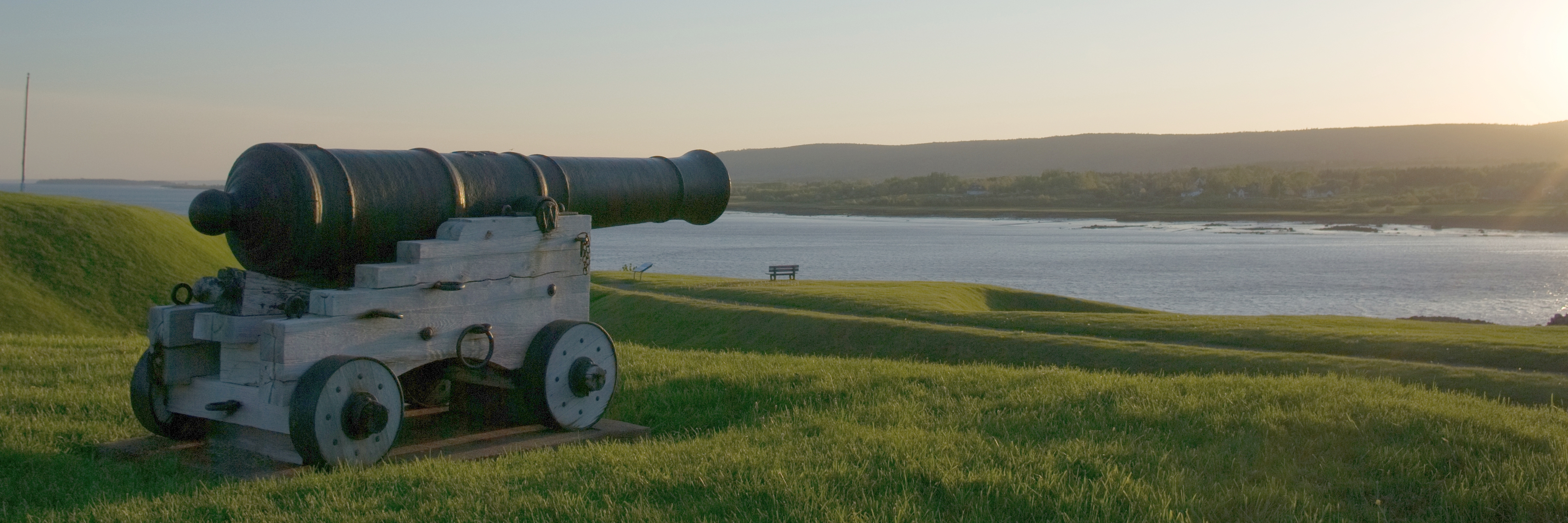
Fort Anne, Canada's First National Historic Site

Attractions outside of the Halifax regional municipality include the following:

- Annapolis Royal, originally settled in 1605, was the original capital of Acadia and Nova Scotia. It contains Fort Anne, Canada's first National Historic Site and the nearby Habitation at Port Royal, the first replica reconstruction undertaken by Parks Canada.
- Cabot Trail on Cape Breton Island originally constructed in 1932 specifically to re-brand Nova Scotia as a tourism destination.
- Fortress of Louisbourg Originally settled in 1713 and subject to two sieges in the 18th century, it is today operated by Parks Canada as a living history museum.
- Nova Scotia Museum of Industry in Stellarton which houses over 30,000 objects in its collection, and has exhibits on coal mining and the Westray Mine disaster of 1992.
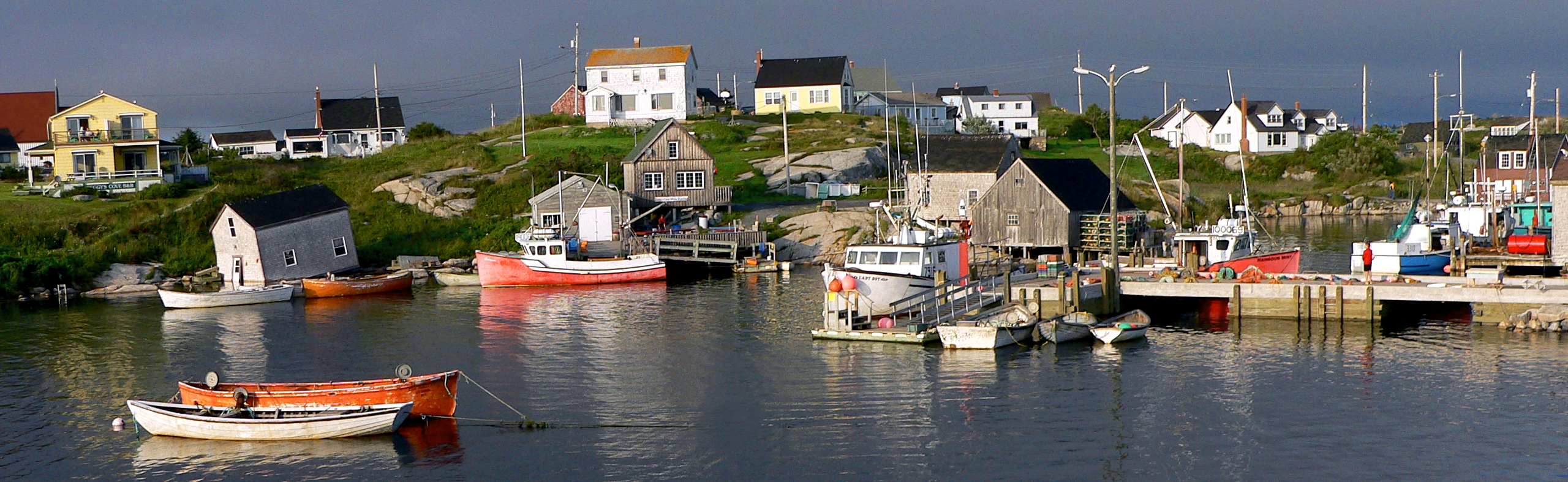
  Harbour at Peggy's Cove
- Peggy's Cove, a fishing village southwest of Halifax, known for its lighthouse and scenery. Shubenacadie Wildlife Park is home to various specimens of wildlife found throughout Canada and beyond, and also includes hiking trails, a picnic area, and a playground.

== Eastern Shore ==
See main page: Tourism on the Eastern Shore (Nova Scotia)

== Transportation in Nova Scotia ==
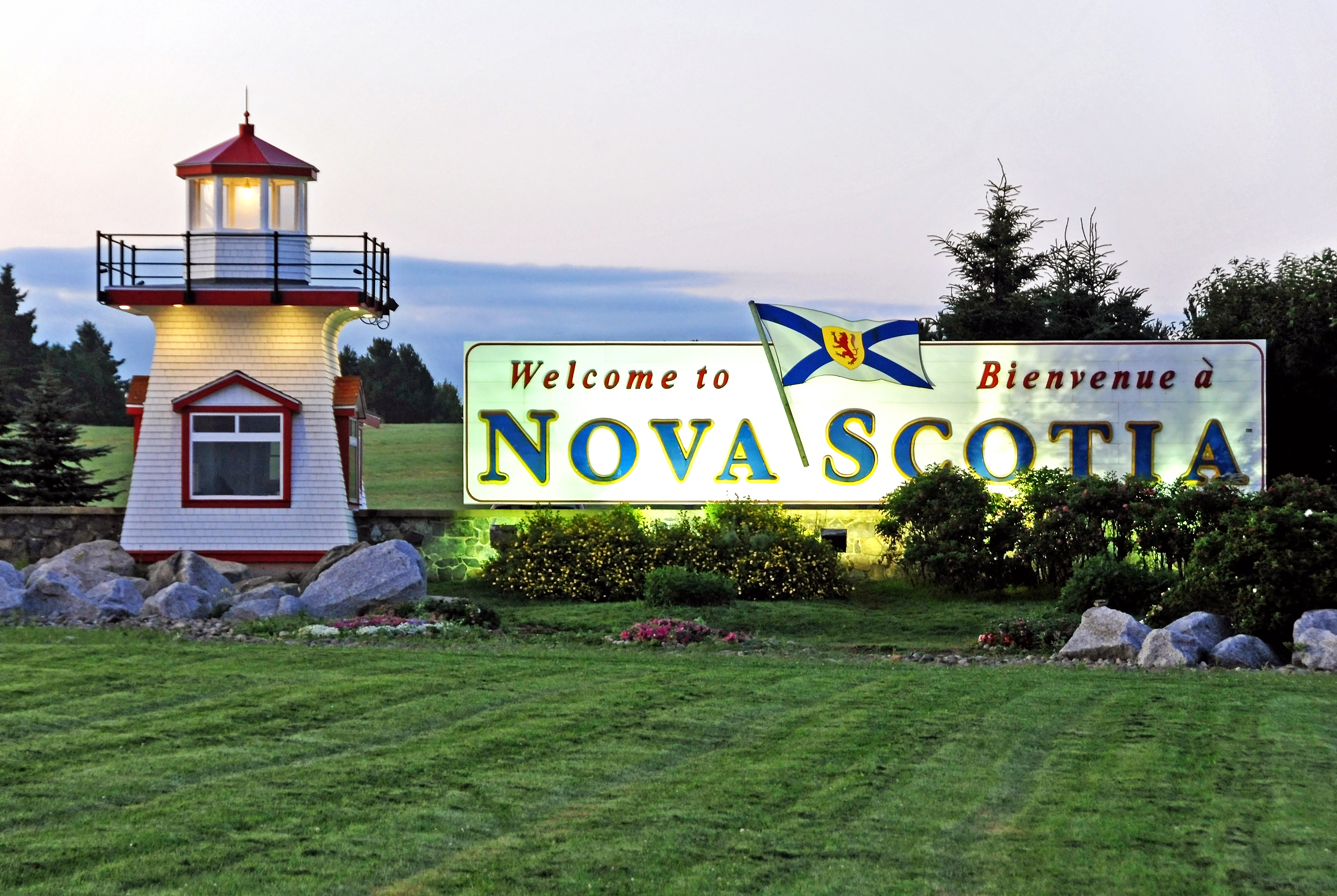
Nova Scotia welcome sign, as seen from New Brunswick

Nova Scotia has a highly developed highway system which allows for road transportation between various communities and tourism sites within the province. Maritime Bus provides road transportation to/from Nova Scotia from the neighbouring province of New Brunswick. Marine Atlantic also provides two ferry links to the communities of Argentia and Port aux Basque, both in the province of Newfoundland and Labrador.

Nova Scotia is connected to Montreal by the Ocean, a train operated by Via Rail. It is also connected to the rest of Canada and the world by Halifax Stanfield International Airport.

== Nova Scotia Tourism Statistics ==
An estimated total of 1,659,000 tourists visited Nova Scotia in the months of January - September 2015, a 6 percent increase over the same period in 2014. This trend reverses a decline in the number of tourists that visited Nova Scotia in 2013, particularly during the off-peak season.

== Gallery ==
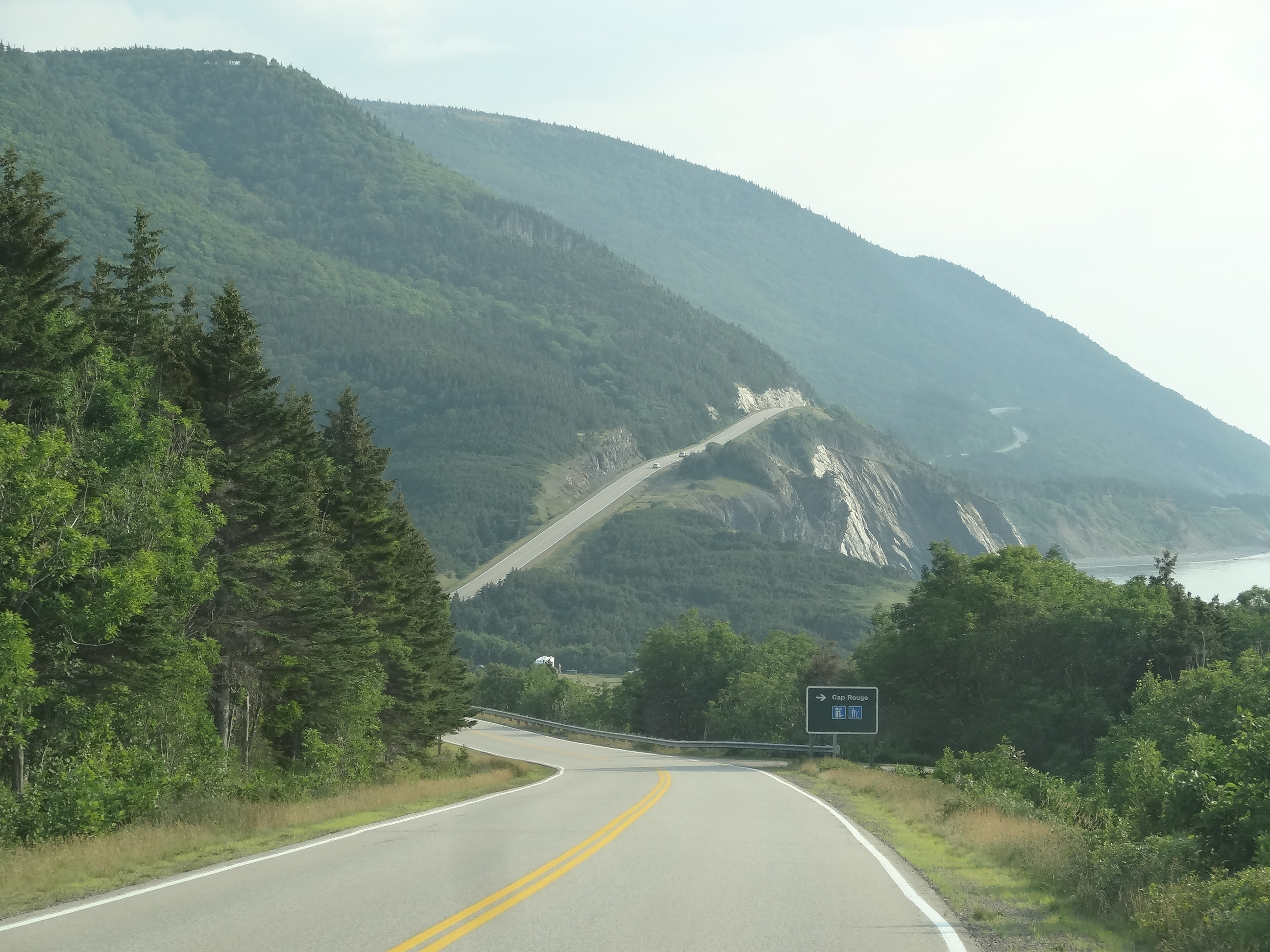
Cabot Trail north of Cheticamp

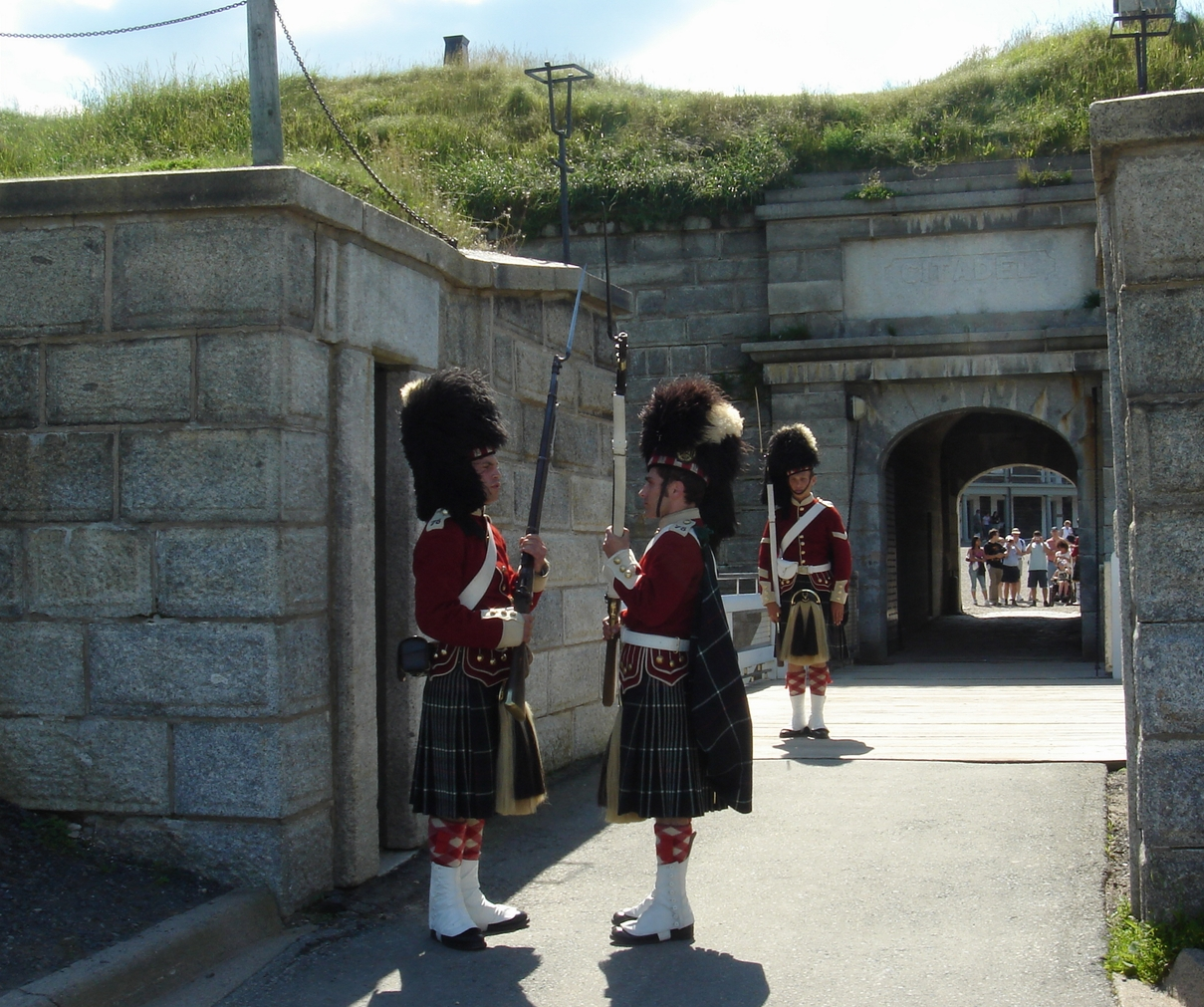
Halifax Citadel - changing guards

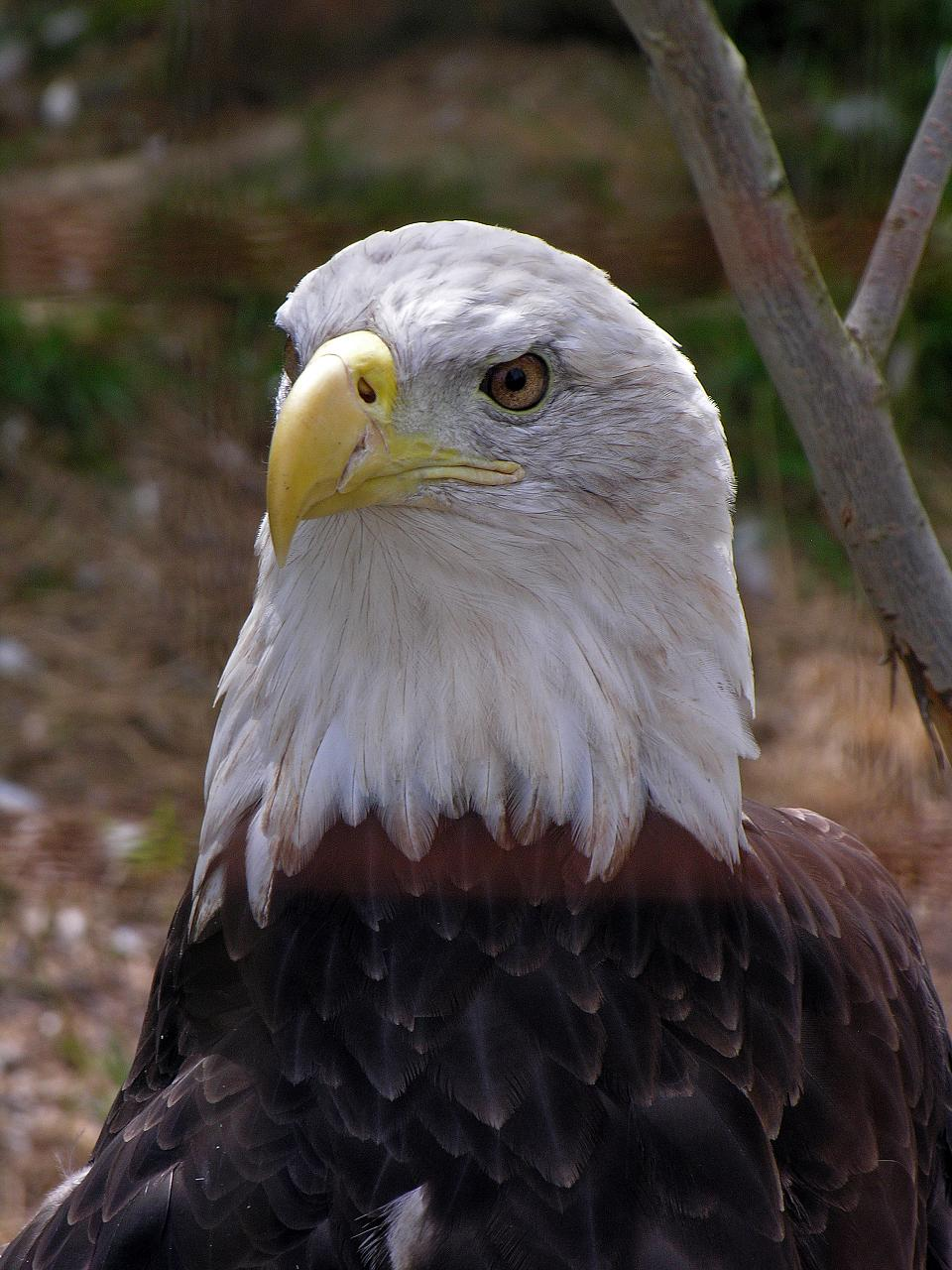
Bald Eagle at the Shubenacadie Wildlife Park

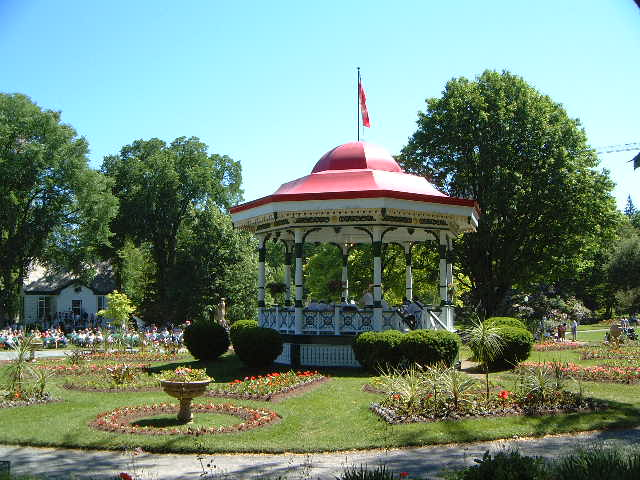
The Halifax Public Gardens on Canada Day

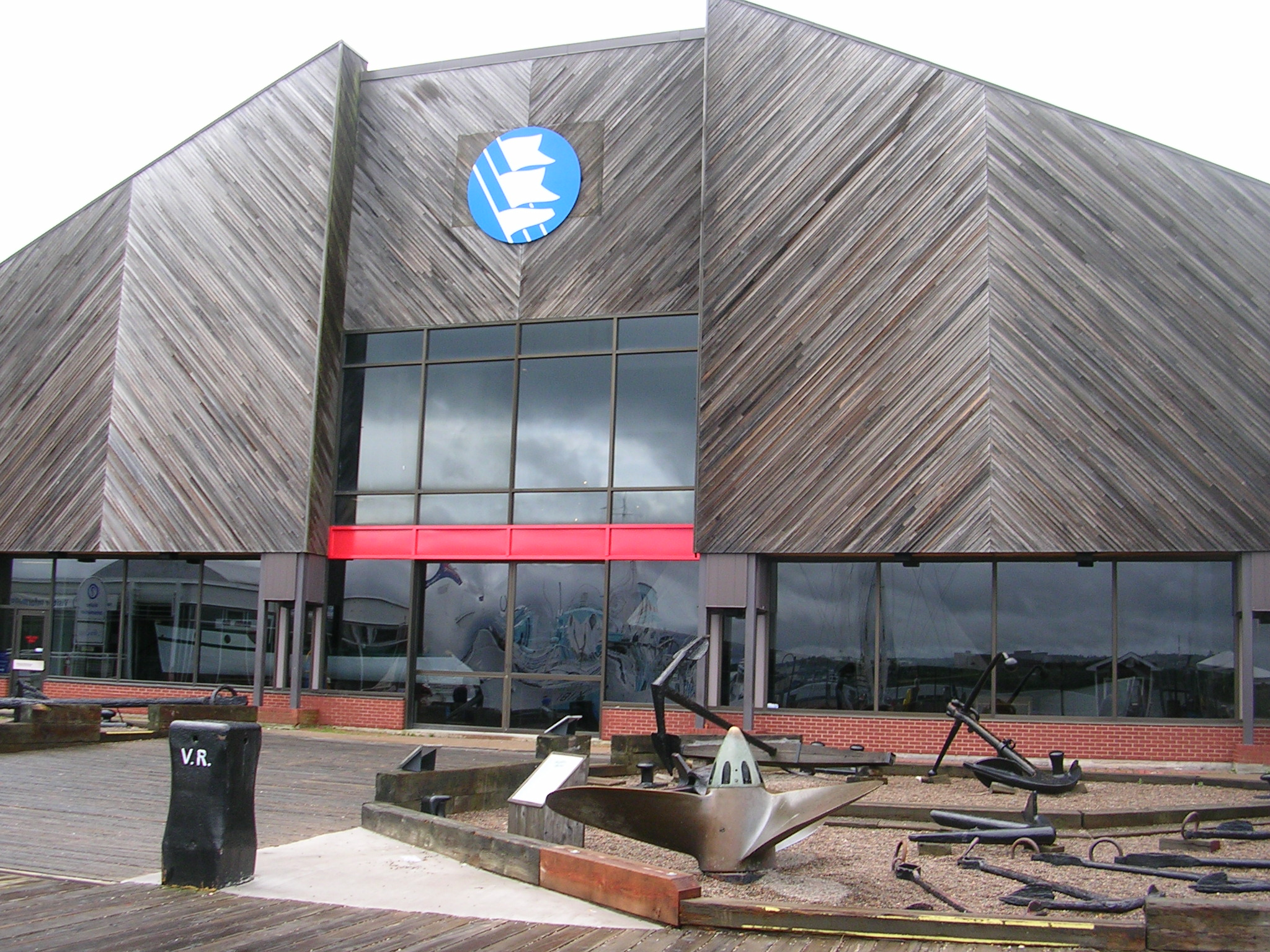
Entrance to the Maritime Museum of the Atlantic

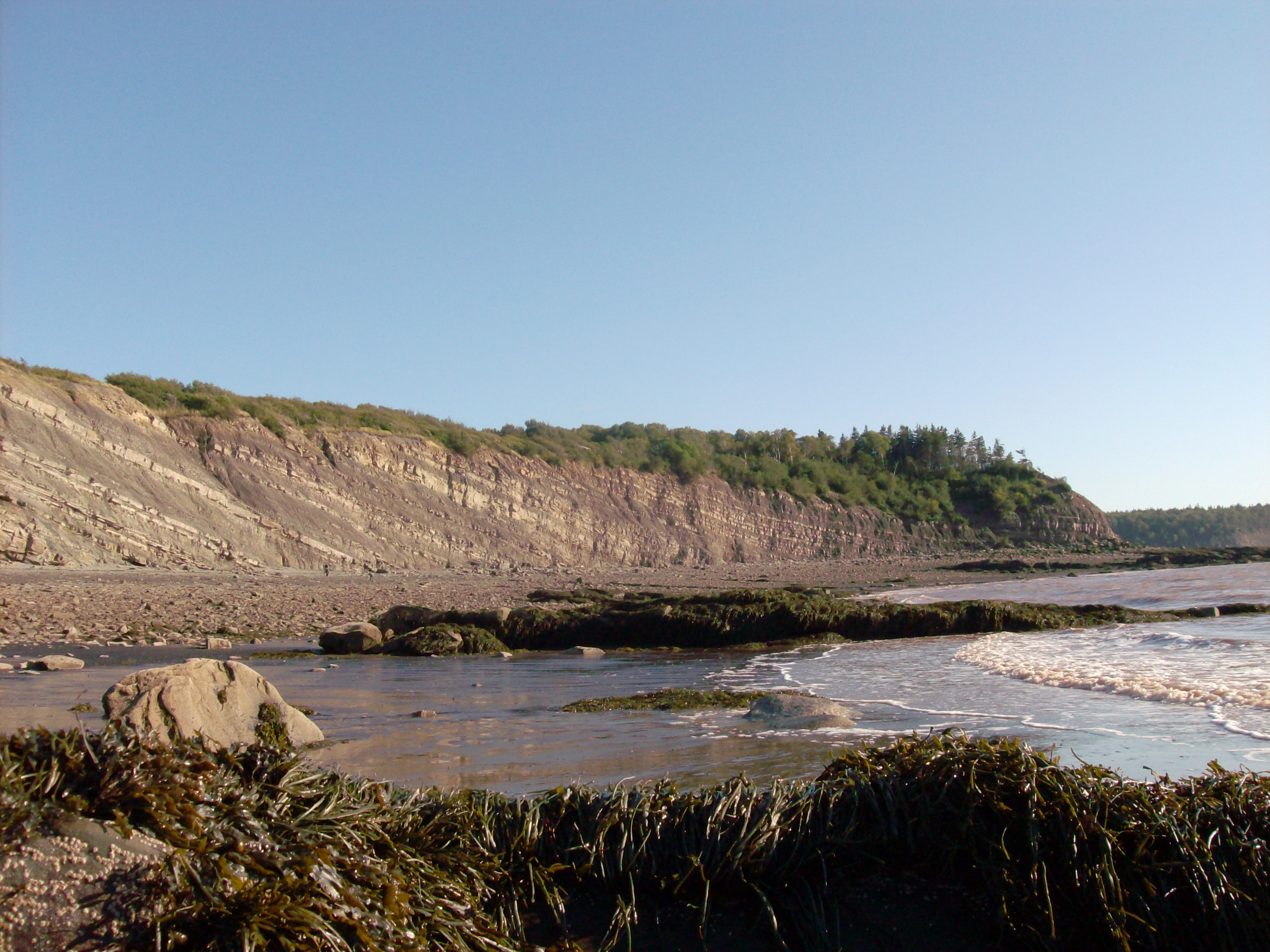
The fossil cliffs at Joggins
