= Department of Agriculture (Prince Edward Island) =

Provincial Government Department

- ministère de l’Agriculture

Department overview
- Formed: 1901; 125 years ago
- Jurisdiction: Prince Edward Island
- Minister responsible: Bloyce Thompson
- Deputy Minister responsible: Dr. Carolyn Sanford

The Department of Agriculture (French: ministère de l’Agriculture) is the department of the Government of Prince Edward Island responsible for growing and sustaining elements of agriculture on PEI, supporting the agriculture industry in its leadership role in climate efforts, protecting the environment and working with farmers to ensure that their locally grown products continue to place PEI among the world leaders in food production and innovation.

The minister of agriculture (currently Bloyce Thompson) is responsible for the department to the General Assembly. While the minister is head of the department, and provides policy/political direction, the day-to-day operations of the department are managed by the deputy minister (currently Dr. Carolyn Sanford), who is a public servant.

== History ==
The Department of Agriculture was formed in 1901 with the purpose of better managing the industry's growth.

== Agencies, Boards and Commissions ==
- Agricultural Insurance Corporation Appeal Board
- Agricultural Insurance Corporation
- Farm Practices Review Board
- PEI Grain Elevators Corporation
- PEI Marketing Council
- Natural Products Appeals Tribunal
- Veterinary College Advisory Council
- Veterinary Medical Association Licensing Board

== Legislation ==
The Department of Agriculture is responsible for a number of laws related to agriculture, food and livestock in Prince Edward Island.

- Agricultural Insurance Act
- Agricultural Products Standards Act
- Agrologists Act
- Animal Welfare Act
- Dairy Producers Act
- Dog Act
- Farm Machinery Dealers and Vendors Act
- Farm Practices Act
- Farm Registration and Farm Organizations Funding Act
- Grain Elevators Corporation Act
- Natural Products Marketing Act
- Plant Health Act
- Stray Livestock Act
- Veterinary Profession Act
- Weed Control Act
- Women's Institute Act
