= Jill Burridge =

Canadian politician

Jill Burridge MLA

Minister of Finance and Affordability
- Incumbent
- Assumed office February, 2026
- Preceded by: Ministry Established

Minister of Finance
- In office April 14, 2023 – February, 2026
- Preceded by: Mark McLane
- Succeeded by: Ministry Abolished

Member of the Legislative Assembly of Prince Edward Island for Stratford-Keppoch
- Incumbent
- Assumed office April 3, 2023
- Preceded by: James Aylward

Personal details
- Party: Progressive Conservative

Jill Burridge is a Canadian politician, who was elected to the Legislative Assembly of Prince Edward Island in the 2023 provincial election. She represents Stratford-Keppoch as a member of the Progressive Conservative Party of Prince Edward Island.

== Electoral record ==
2023 Prince Edward Island general election: Stratford-Keppoch
| Party | Candidate | Votes | % | ±% |
|---|---|---|---|---|
| Progressive Conservative | Jill Burridge | 1,479 | 52.30 | +9.80 |
| Green | Lana Beth Barkhouse | 847 | 29.90 | +3.0 |
| Liberal | Greg Arsenault | 471 | 16.60 | -12.90 |
| New Democratic | Olalekan Faromika | 32 | 1.10 | +.10 |
| Total valid votes | | 2837 | | |
| Total rejected ballots | | 8 | 0.28 | |
| Turnout | | 2,845 | | |
| Progressive Conservative hold | | Swing | | +14.40 |
