= Department of Health and Wellness (Prince Edward Island) =

- ministère de la Santé et du Mieux-être

Department overview
- Jurisdiction: Prince Edward Island
- Minister responsible: Bloyce Thompson
- Deputy Minister responsible: Lisa Thibeau

The Department of Health and Wellness (French: ministère de la Santé et du Mieux-être) is the department of the Government of Prince Edward Island responsible for providing oversight to health services in the province in accordance with the Health Services Act. It establishes an accountability framework, standards for health services, performance targets, policy or guidelines for managing operations and delivery of services, and approvals for business plans and budgets. The department also provides leadership in all matters related to public health and health promotion and informs policy to improve the health and well-being of citizens.

The minister of justice and public safety (currently Mark McLane) is responsible for the department to the General Assembly. While the minister is head of the department, and provides policy/political direction, the day-to-day operations of the department are managed by the deputy minister (currently Lisa Thibeau), who is a public servant.

== History ==
The Department of Health and Wellness in Prince Edward Island has a history intertwined with the evolution of health services on the island. It was established to provide leadership and policy direction for PEI's healthcare system. A significant milestone was the creation of Health PEI in July 2010, which marked a shift towards a more unified and integrated healthcare system.

== Agencies, Boards and Commissions ==
- Council of the Prince Edward Island College of Occupational Therapists
- Community Care Facilities and Nursing Homes Board
- Community Health Engagement Committees
- Council of the College of Allied Health Professionals of Prince Edward Island
- Council of the College of Audiology and Speech-Language Pathology of Prince Edward Island
- Council of the College of Counselling Therapy of Prince Edward Island
- Council of the College of Dental Hygienists of Prince Edward Island
- Council of the College of Dietitians of Prince Edward Island
- Council of the College of Licensed Practical Nurses of PEI
- Council of the College of Massage Therapists of PEI
- Council of the College of Paramedicine of Prince Edward Island
- Council of the College of Physicians and Surgeons of Prince Edward Island
- Council of the College of Registered Nurses and Midwives of Prince Edward Island
- Council of the Prince Edward Island Chiropractic Association
- Council of the Prince Edward Island College of Pharmacy
- Council of the Prince Edward Island College of Physiotherapy
- Council of the Prince Edward Island Dental College
- Health PEI Board of Directors
- Mental Health Review Board
- Prince Edward Island Psychologists Registration Board
- Promoting Wellness, Preserving Health Action Plan Implementation Council
- The Council of the Prince Edward Island College of Optometrists

== Legislation ==
The Department of Health and Wellness is responsible for a number of laws related to the welfare and health of people in Prince Edward Island.

- Adult Protection Act
- Ambulance Services Act
- Chiropractic Act
- Community Care Facilities and Nursing Homes Act
- Consent to Treatment and Health Care Directives Act
- Denturists Act
- Dispensing Opticians Act
- Donation of Food Act
- Drug Cost Assistance Act
- Health and Dental Services Cost Assistance Act
- Health Information Act
- Health Services Act
- Health Services Payment Act
- Hospital and Diagnostic Services Insurance Act
- Hospitals Act
- Human Tissue Donation Act
- Long-Term Care Subsidization Act
- Medical Society Act
- Mental Health Act
- Narcotics Safety and Awareness Act
- Pharmacy Act
- Provincial Health Number Act
- Psychologists Act
- Public Health Act
- Registered Health Professions Act
- Regulated Health Professions Act
- Smoke-free Places Act
- Stretcher Transportation Act
- Tobacco and Electronic Smoking Device Sales and Access Act
- White Cane Act
