= Nova Scotia Provincial Housing Agency =

Nova Scotia government agency

- Type: Crown corporation
- Industry: Housing
- Founded: 1 December 2022
- Headquarters: Halifax, Nova Scotia, Canada
- Owners: Government of Nova Scotia
- Website: nspha.ca

The Nova Scotia Provincial Housing Agency (NSPHA) is a Crown corporation responsible for administering public housing in the Canadian province of Nova Scotia. It was formed in 2022 through a merger of five regional housing authorities.

== History ==
In 2022, the Nova Scotia Affordable Housing Commission (appointed in 2020) released its final progress report. The commission made several recommendations, including the modernisation of provincial housing legislation and the establishment of a "arm’s length independent provincial housing entity". The same year, Nova Scotia's auditor general released a report critical of the management of public housing in the province.

The Nova Scotia Provincial Housing Agency was established by the Housing Supply and Services Act, which replaced the Housing Act and Housing Nova Scotia Act in late 2022. Under the new legislation, NSPHA was formed by merging Nova Scotia's five regional housing authorities:

- Cape Breton Island Regional Housing Authority
- Cobequid Housing Authority
- Eastern Mainland Housing Authority
- Metro Regional Housing Authority
- Western Regional Housing Authority

The housing authority boards were also dissolved. The NSPHA has an advisory board that answers to Nova Scotia's minister of housing. At the time of its establishment, the NSPHA was responsible for around 11,200 housing units.

== Administrative structure ==
The NSPHA is headquartered in Halifax and has four regional offices:

- Cape Breton Island District – Cape Breton Island
- Metropolitan District – Halifax region
- Northern District – Guysborough County, Antigonish County, Pictou County, Cumberland County, Colchester County
- Western District – Kings County, Annapolis County, Digby County, Yarmouth County, Shelburne County, Queens County, Lunenburg County and Hants County (East and West)
