= Department of Justice and Public Safety =

- ministère de la Justice et de la Sécurité publique

Department overview
- Jurisdiction: Prince Edward Island
- Minister responsible: Bloyce Thompson
- Deputy Minister responsible: Jonah Clements

The Department of Justice and Public Safety (French: ministère de la Justice et de la Sécurité publique) is the department of the Government of Prince Edward Island responsible for developing support to reduce risks to the community and strengthen the criminal and civil justice systems. The department coordinates efforts for efficient public safety services to protect citizens from threats to their personal and economic stability.

The minister of Justice and Public Safety (currently Bloyce Thompson) is responsible for the department to the General Assembly. Prince Edward Island has a tradition of pairing this ministry the position of the Attorney General. While the minister is head of the department, and provides policy/political direction, the day-to-day operations of the department are managed by the deputy minister (currently Jonah Clements), who is a public servant.

== Agencies, boards and commissions ==
- Court Transcribers Examining Board
- Credit Union Deposit Insurance Corporation
- Human Rights Commission (link is external)
- Judicial Remuneration Review Commission
- Law Society Council
- Criminal Code Review Board
- Police Commissioner (link is external)
- Public Trustee Advisory Committee
- Supreme Court Finance Committee
- Victim Services Advisory Committee

== Legislation ==
The Department of Justice and Public Safety is responsible for a number of laws related to enacting justice and crime prevention in Prince Edward Island.

The actual text/content that will be distributed across the columns.
