= Prince Edward Island Liquor Control Commission =

- Trade name: PEI Liquor
- Type: Crown Corporation
- Industry: Beverages
- Founded: Charlottetown (1918)
- Headquarters: Charlottetown, Prince Edward Island, Canada
- Key people: Quentin Bevan, Chairman; James C. MacLeod, CEO
- Products: Alcohol
- Website: www.liquorpei.com

The Prince Edward Island Liquor Control Commission, operating as PEI Liquor (French: Alcool Î.-P.-É.), is a provincial Crown corporation that controls the purchase, distribution and sale of alcoholic beverages in the Canadian province of Prince Edward Island.

The commission operates nineteen retail liquor stores as well as a central warehouse and distribution centre in Charlottetown.

The commission had $69 million in gross sales during 2006. The commission had just over $108 million in gross sales in the 2016-2017 fiscal year.

As of 2020, Quentin Bevan is chairman of the Liquor Control Commission Board and James C. MacLeod is the Chief Executive Officer.
