= Government of Prince Edward Island =

- Provincial government

Overview
- Established: July 1, 1873
- Country: Canada
- Polity: Province
- Leader: Premier; Bloyce Thompson
- Appointed by: Lieutenant Governor; Wassim Salamoun
- Main organ: Executive Council
- Responsible to: Legislative Assembly
- Headquarters: Charlottetown
- Website: www.princeedwardisland.ca

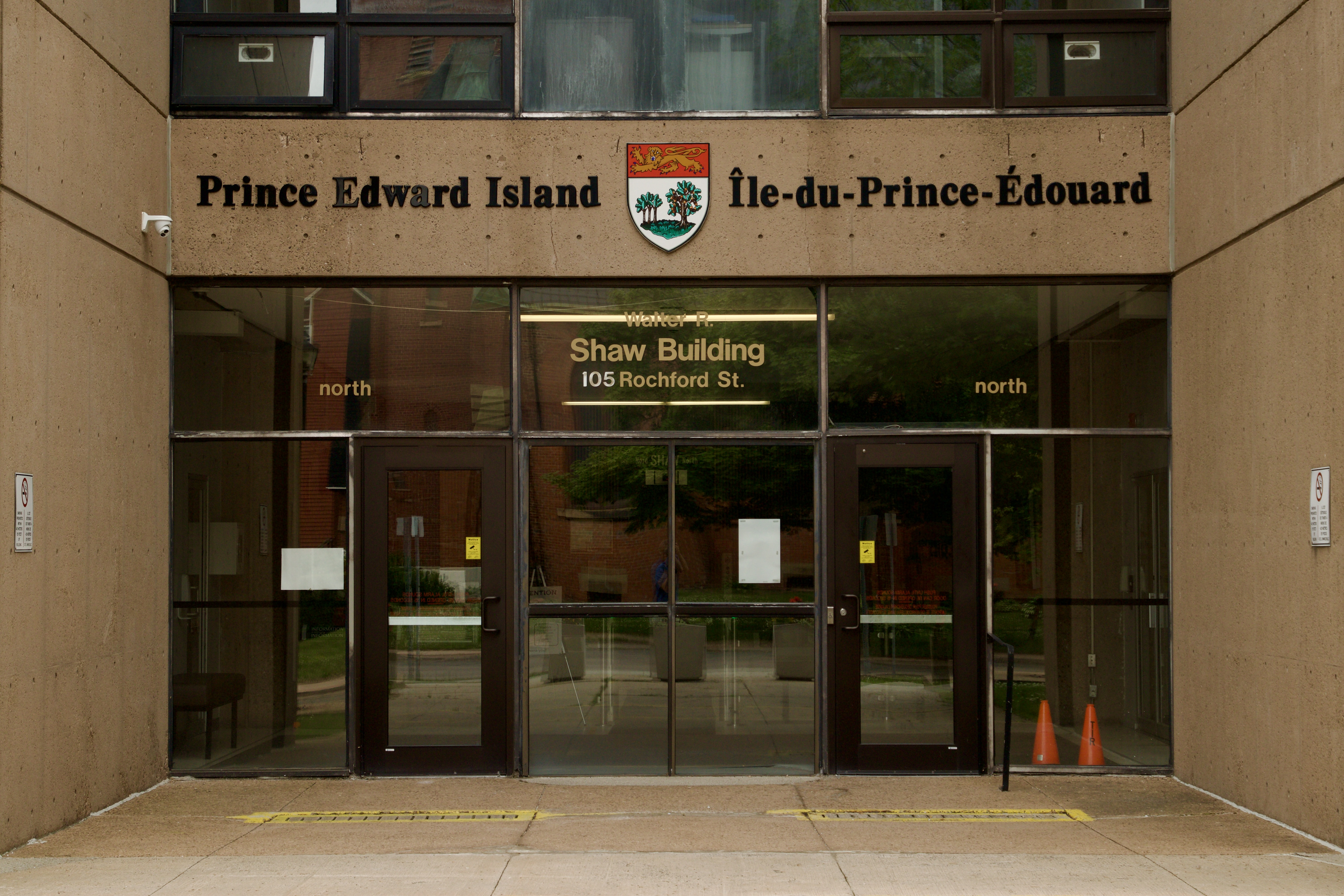
Shaw Building, headquarters of the Government of Prince Edward Island

The Government of Prince Edward Island is the provincial government of the province of Prince Edward Island. Its powers and structure are set out in the Constitution Act, 1867.

In modern Canadian use, the term "government" referred broadly to the cabinet of the day (formally the Executive Council), chosen from the Legislative Assembly and the non-political staff within each provincial department or agency – that is, the civil service.

The Province of Prince Edward Island has a unicameral legislature, the General Assembly composed of the Lieutenant Governor and the Legislative Assembly, which operates in the framework of a Westminster-style parliamentary constitutional monarchy. The political party that wins the largest number of seats in its only chamber, the Legislative Assembly, normally forms the Government, and the party's leader becomes premier of the province, the head of government.

== Role of the Crown ==
The functions of the Sovereign, Charles III, King of Canada and King in Right of Prince Edward Island, are exercised by the Lieutenant Governor. The Lieutenant Governor is appointed by the Governor General of Canada on the recommendation of the Prime Minister of Canada, in consultation with the Premier of Prince Edward Island.

== Ministries ==
- Department of Agriculture
- Department of Economic Development, Innovation, and Trade
- Department of Education and Early Years
- Department of Environment, Energy, and Climate Action
- Department of Finance
- Department of Fisheries, Tourism, Sports and Culture
- Department of Health and Wellness
- Department of Justice and Public Safety
- Department of Housing, Land and Communities
- Department of Transportation and Infrastructure
- Department of Social Development and Seniors
- Department of Workforce, Advanced Learning and Population

=== Public administration ===
Frank MacKinnon's book "The Government of Prince Edward Island" (1951) provides an early view of public administration in the province. MacKinnon characterized the Government of Prince Edward Island as being located in a “small place” and an “unusual example of local democracy”. Throughout the 1990’s, the public service went through significant change with budget cuts and the introduction of new ways of thinking about governance and management.

Today, public administration in Prince Edward Island is thought to be affected by the relatively small size of both the civil service and province (both in terms of population and land area). The provincial civil service establishment consists of approximately 4,343 civil servants as of March 31, 2022 while the population of the province is approximately 170,000 (therefore, approximately 3% of residents of the province work for the provincial civil service).

Prince Edward Island being a small place provides benefits and challenges for public administration. It can be difficult for public administrators to remain objective and make difficult policy choices when there are close personal connections between civil servants, politicians and residents. However, expedited public engagement and problem identification is thought to be enhanced by the small context of Prince Edward Island’s public administration which allows for quickly identifying problems, leading to more opportunities for innovation and positive change. Public administrators have reported that there is a continued need for new tools for civil servants to promote innovation and change in the province. Overall, an enduring challenge for public administration and administrators in this province is the reality that services must be provided in the same manner and degree as larger provinces, but with a significantly lower budget and capacity to do so.

Provincial public administration in Prince Edward Island is overseen by several accountability mechanisms and offices including the Civil Services Act, an Ethics and Integrity Commissioner as well as an Ombudsperson and Public Interest Disclosure Commissioner. There is also a diversity management policy which provides structure and resources for promoting equity and inclusion in the civil service.

==== Controversies ====
The period of 1900 to 1966 is marked with several controversies involving public administration in Prince Edward Island, including widespread government appointments based on patronage. More recently, three former civil servants filed a $1.8M suit against a former P.E.I. premier and government agency over a privacy breach related to complaints against an immigration program. This incident is connected to a larger event involving claims of corruption and conflicts of interest associated with a program that allegedly provided preferential treatment to some individuals over others.

Other controversies include:

- political interference in the healthcare system (2023, 2026)
- a multi-million dollar suit filed against the Government of Prince Edward Island in relation to a freedom of information request (2021)
- a development project that went ahead despite a stop-work order (2023)
- questionable purchases made by the Minister of Finance(2022) and Minister of Agriculture (2014)
- policies regarding foster parents (2019)
- allegations related to e-gaming (2019)
- conflict of interest issues related to a senior civil servant (2022)
- contravention of the Archives and Records Act in relation to not disclosing missing e-mails during an access to information request (2020)
- failure to provide documents as part of an access to information request associated with a legal proceeding (2021)
- harassment complaints in Executive Council Office (2024)
- lack of transparency in public spending (2024)
- mismanagement of a community outreach centre (2023)
- a secretive contract with the National Hockey League (NHL) and potential conflicts of interest with elected officials (2024)
- salary increases for health executives without proper approvals (2024)
- rising deficit and debt load despite repeated warnings from the provincial Auditor General (2026)
- conflict of interest interest breach with a Minister and a golf course development project (2026)

== See also ==
- Politics of Prince Edward Island
- Lieutenant Governor of Prince Edward Island
- Premier of Prince Edward Island
- Legislative Assembly of Prince Edward Island
- 2019 Prince Edward Island electoral reform referendum
- Executive Council of Prince Edward Island
