= 1996 Canadian census =

Census in Canada

- May 14, 1996

General information
- Country: Canada

Results
- Total population: 28,846,761 (▲5.7%)
- Most populous province/territory: Ontario (10,753,573)
- Least populous province/territory: Yukon (30,766)

The 1996 Canadian census was a detailed enumeration of the Canadian population. Census day was May 14, 1996. On that day, Statistics Canada attempted to count every person in Canada. The total population count of Canada was 28,846,761. This was a 5.7% increase over the 1991 census of 27,296,859.

The previous census was the 1991 census and the following census was in 2001 census.

== Canada by the numbers ==
A summary of information about Canada.

Total population	28,846,761
Dwellings	10,899,427
Men	14,170,025
Women	14,676,735
Median age	35.3 years
Average earnings	$26,474

== Population by province ==
Rank	Province or territory	Population as of 1996 census	Population as of 1991 census	Change	Percent change
1	Ontario	10,753,573	10,084,885	668,688 ▲	6.6 ▲
2	Quebec	7,138,795	6,895,963	242,832 ▲	3.5 ▲
3	British Columbia	3,724,500	3,282,061	442,439 ▲	13.5 ▲
4	Alberta	2,696,826	2,545,553	151,273 ▲	5.9 ▲
5	Manitoba	1,113,898	1,091,942	21,956 ▲	2.0 ▲
6	Saskatchewan	990,237	988,928	2,969 ▲	0.1 ▲
7	Nova Scotia	909,282	899,942	9,340 ▲	1.0 ▲
8	New Brunswick	738,133	723,900	14,233 ▲	2.0 ▲
9	Newfoundland and Labrador	551,792	568,474	-16,682 ▼	-2.9 ▼
10	Prince Edward Island	134,557	129,765	4,792 ▲	3.7 ▲
11	Northwest Territories	64,402	57,649	6,753 ▲	11.7 ▲
12	Yukon	30,766	27,797	2,969 ▲	10.7 ▲
	Canada	28,846,761	27,296,859	1,549,902 ▲	5.7 ▲

== Demographics ==
=== Mother tongue ===
Population by mother tongue of Canada's official languages:

Mother tongue	Population
English	16,890,615
French	6,636,660
Bilingual	107,945
Other	4,598,290

=== Aboriginal peoples ===
Population of Aboriginal peoples in Canada:

Aboriginal Population	799,010
North American Indian	529,035
Metis	204,115
Inuit	40,225

=== Ethnic origin ===
Population by ethnic origin. Only those origins with more than 250,000 respondents are included here. This is based entirely on self reporting.

Ethnic origins	Total responses	Single responses	Multiple responses 2
Total population	28,528,125	18,303,625	10,224,495
Canadian	8,806,275	5,326,995	3,479,285
English	6,832,095	2,048,275	4,783,820
French	5,597,845	2,665,250	2,932,595
Scottish	4,260,840	642,970	3,617,870
Irish	3,767,610	504,030	3,263,580
German	2,757,140	726,145	2,030,990
Italian	1,207,475	729,455	478,025
North American Indian	1,101,955	477,630	624,330
Ukrainian	1,026,475	331,680	694,790
Chinese	921,585	800,470	121,115
Dutch (Netherlands)	916,215	313,880	602,335
Polish	786,735	265,930	520,805
East Indian	723,345	590,145	133,200
Jewish	351,705	195,810	155,900
Norwegian	346,310	47,805	298,500
Welsh	338,905	27,915	310,990
Portuguese	335,110	252,640	82,470
Swedish	278,975	31,200	247,775
Russian	272,335	46,885	225,450
Hungarian (Magyar)	250,525	94,185	156,340

=== Visible minorities ===
Visible minority	Total responses	% of Population
Chinese	860,150	3.02
South Asian	670,590	2.35
Black	573,860	2.01
Arab/West Asian	244,665	0.86
Filipino	234,195	0.82
Others	614,025	2.15
Not a visible minority	25,330,645	88.79

=== Age ===
Population by age:

Age	Population
Under 15 years	5,901,275
15–24 years	3,857,175
25–44 years	9,360,615
45–64 years	6,199,855
65–74 years	2,061,935
75 years and over	1,465,910

== See also ==
- List of population of Canada by years
- Demographics of Canada
- Ethnic groups in Canada
- History of immigration to Canada
- Population and housing censuses by country
