= 2001 Canadian census =

Detailed enumeration of the Canadian population

- May 15, 2001

General information
- Country: Canada

Results
- Total population: 30,007,094 (▲4.0%)
- Most populous province/territory: Ontario (11,410,046)
- Least populous province/territory: Nunavut (26,745)

The 2001 Canadian census was a detailed enumeration of the Canadian population. Census day was May 15, 2001. On that day, Statistics Canada attempted to count every person in Canada. The total population count of Canada was 30,007,094. This was a 4% increase over 1996 census of 28,846,761. In contrast, the official Statistics Canada population estimate for 2001 was 31,021,300. This is considered a more accurate population number than the actual count.

The previous census was the 1996 census and the following census was in 2006 census.

== Canada by the numbers ==
A summary of information about Canada.

Total population	30,007,094
Dwellings	12,548,588
Men	14,706,850
Women	15,300,245
Median age	37.6 years
Average earnings	$31,757

== Census summary ==
Canada has experienced one of the smallest census-to-census growth rates in its population. From 1996 to 2001, the nation's population increased only 4.0%. The census counted 30,007,094 people on May 15, 2001, compared with 28,846,761 on May 14, 1996.

Only three provinces and one territory had growth rates above the national average. Alberta's population soared 10.3%, Ontario gained 6.1% and British Columbia, 4.9%. Nunavut's population rose 8.1%. The population of Newfoundland and Labrador declined for the second consecutive census period.

Urbanization continued. In 2001, 79.4% of Canadians lived in an urban centre of 10,000 people or more, compared with 78.5% in 1996. Outside the urban centres, the population of rural and small-town areas declined 0.4%.

In 2001, just over 64% of the nation's population, or about 19,297,000 people, lived in the 27 census metropolitan areas (CMAs), up slightly from 63% in 1996. Seven of these 27 CMAs saw their populations grow at a rate of at least double the national average. The strongest rise, by far, occurred in Calgary.

From 1996 to 2001, the nation's population concentrated further in four broad urban regions: the extended Golden Horseshoe in southern Ontario; Montreal and environs; British Columbia's Lower Mainland and southern Vancouver Island; and the Calgary-Edmonton corridor. In 2001, 51% of Canada's population lived in these regions, compared with 49% in 1996.

== Population by province/territory ==
Rank	Province or territory	Population as of 2001 census	Population as of 1996 census	Change	Percent change
1	Ontario	11,410,046	10,753,573	656,473 ▲	6.1 ▲
2	Quebec	7,237,479	7,138,795	98,684 ▲	1.4 ▲
3	British Columbia	3,907,738	3,724,500	183,238 ▲	4.9 ▲
4	Alberta	2,974,807	2,696,826	277,981 ▲	10.3 ▲
5	Manitoba	1,119,583	1,113,898	5,685 ▲	0.5 ▲
6	Saskatchewan	978,933	990,237	-2,318 ▼	-1.1 ▼
7	Nova Scotia	908,007	909,282	-1,275 ▼	-0.1 ▼
8	New Brunswick	729,498	738,133	-8,635 ▼	-1.2 ▼
9	Newfoundland and Labrador	512,930	551,792	-38,862 ▼	-7.0 ▼
10	Prince Edward Island	135,294	134,557	737 ▲	0.5 ▲
11	Northwest Territories	37,360	39,672 (Note: Adjusted figure due to boundary change)	-2,312 ▼	-5.8 ▼
12	Yukon	28,674	30,766	-2,092 ▼	-6.8 ▼
13	Nunavut	26,745	24,730 (Note: Adjusted figure due to boundary change)	2,015 ▲	8.1 ▲
	Canada	30,007,094	28,846,761	1,160,333 ▲	4.0 ▲

== Demographics ==
=== Mother tongue ===
Population by mother tongue of Canada's official languages:

Mother tongue	Population
English	17,572,170
French	6,741,955
Bilingual	122,660
Other	5,202,240

=== Aboriginal peoples ===
Population of Aboriginal peoples in Canada:

Aboriginal Population	976,305
North American Indian	608,850
Métis	292,305
Inuit	45,070

=== Ethnic origin ===
Population by ethnic origin. Only those origins with more than 250,000 respondents are included here. This is based entirely on self reporting.

Ethnic origins	Total responses	Single responses	Multiple responses 2
Total population	29,639,035	18,307,540	11,331,490
Canadian	11,682,680	6,748,135	4,934,550
English	5,978,875	1,479,520	4,499,355
French	4,668,410	1,060,755	3,607,655
Scottish	4,157,210	607,235	3,549,975
Irish	3,822,660	496,865	3,325,800
German	2,742,765	705,595	2,037,170
Italian	1,270,370	726,275	544,090
Chinese	1,094,700	936,210	158,490
Ukrainian	1,071,060	326,200	744,860
North American Indian	1,000,890	455,805	545,085
Dutch (Netherlands)	923,310	316,220	607,090
Polish	817,085	260,415	556,670
African	731,044	Unknown	Unknown
East Indian	713,330	581,665	131,665
Norwegian	363,760	47,230	316,530
Portuguese	357,690	252,835	104,855
Welsh	350,365	28,445	321,925
Jewish	348,605	186,475	162,130
Russian	337,960	70,890	267,070
Filipino	327,545	266,140	61,410
Métis	307,845	72,210	235,635
Swedish	282,760	30,440	252,320
Hungarian (Magyar)	267,255	91,795	175,460
American (USA)	250,010	25,200	224,805

=== Religion ===
Population by religion. Only those religions with more than 250,000 respondents are included here. The census question was partly aided—that is, the questionnaire form gave examples of some of the denominations but not others. The actual question asked is noted below.

Religion	Total responses	% of Population
Roman Catholic	12,793,125	43.2
No religion	4,796,325	16.2
United Church	2,839,125	9.6
Anglican	2,035,500	6.9
Christian n.i.e.	780,450	2.6
Baptist	729,470	2.5
Lutheran	606,590	2.0
Muslim	579,640	2.0
Protestant n.i.e.	549,205	1.9
Presbyterian	409,830	1.4
Pentecostal	369,475	1.2
Jewish	329,995	1.1
Buddhist	300,345	1.0
Hindu	297,200	1.0
Sikh	278,410	0.9
Jediism	21,000	0.1

The actual question asked: "What is this person's religion? Indicate a specific denomination or religion even if this person is not currently a practising member of that group.

For example, Roman Catholic, Ukrainian Catholic, United Church, Anglican, Lutheran, Baptist, Coptic Orthodox, Greek Orthodox, Jewish, Islam, Buddhist, Hindu, Sikh, etc."

=== Visible minorities ===
Visible minority	Total responses	% of Population
Chinese	1,029,395	3.47
South Asian	917,070	3.09
Black	662,215	2.23
Filipino	308,575	1.04
Others	1,066,590	3.60
Not a visible minority	25,655,185	86.56

=== Age ===
Population by age:

Age	Population
0–4 years	1,696,285
5–14 years	4,029,255
15–19 years	2,053,325
20–24 years	1,955,810
25–44 years	9,096,560
45–54 years	4,419,290
55–64 years	2,868,015
65–74 years	2,142,835
75–84 years	1,329,810
85 years and over	415,910

== Methodology ==
Every person was legally required to return the census questionnaire that required answering basic demographic information. In addition randomly selected people were legally required to complete a much more detailed questionnaire.

On May 15, 2001, Statistics Canada had thousands of canvassers who went around to try to ensure that the entire population was counted. For the first time, this included canvassers who went to homeless shelters to ensure that the homeless were included in the census.

In addition to a small number of individuals who refused to participate, some first nation communities refused to participate en masse and therefore some of the statistics are inaccurate. This is noted as footnotes in many of the affected results.

== Effects of the census ==
The census numbers are the basis of the federal governments transfer payments to the provinces and therefore when a province loses population, its transfer payments are decreased.

In addition, the census numbers are one of the elements that Elections Canada uses to create the boundaries of federal ridings.

== See also ==
- Population of Canada
- Demographics of Canada
- Ethnic groups in Canada
- History of immigration to Canada
- Population and housing censuses by country
