= Falconwood, Charlottetown =

Area of Prince Edward Island, Canada

Falconwood
- neighborhood
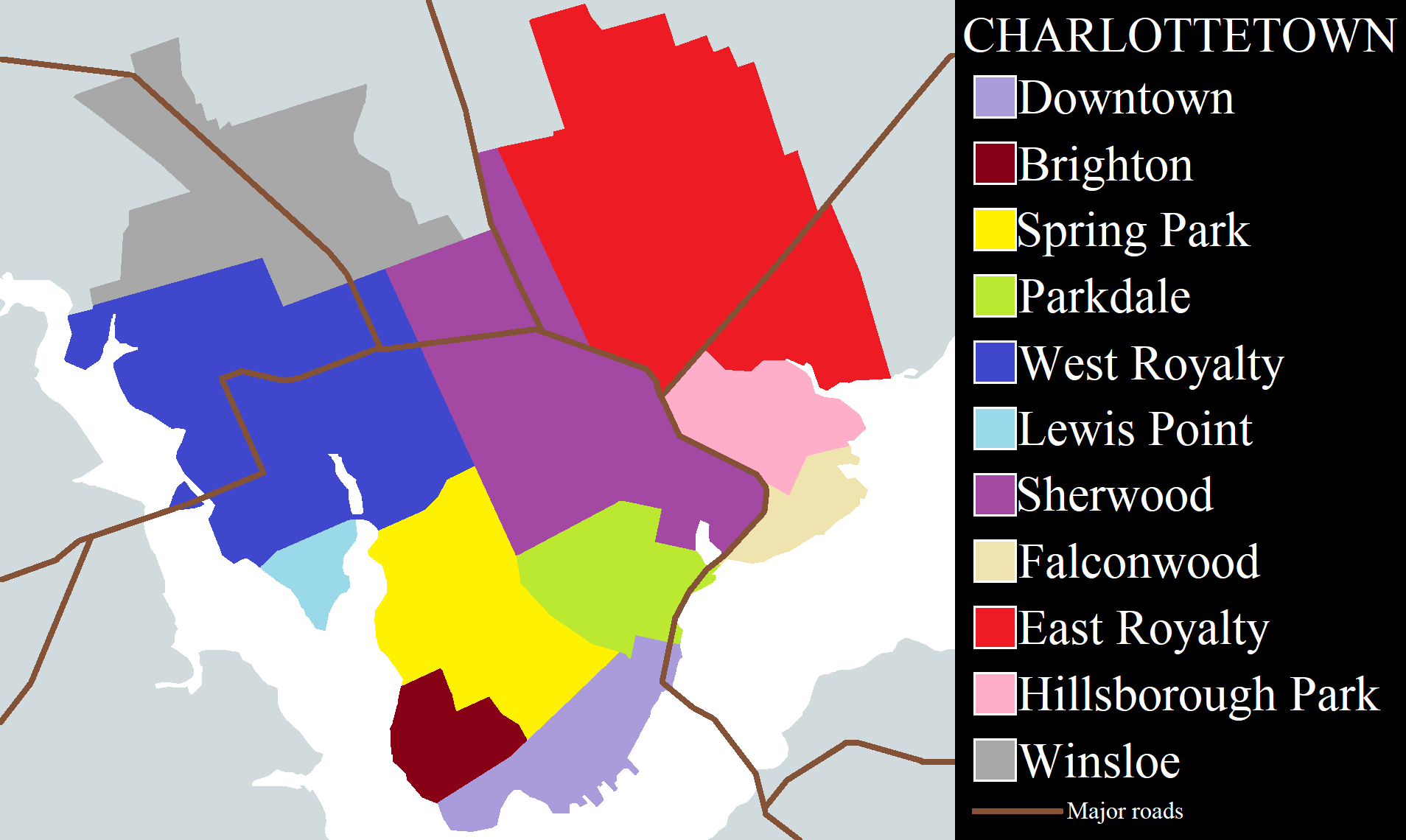
- The neighbourhoods of Charlottetown
- Interactive map of Falconwood
- Federal riding: Charlottetown
- Provincial riding: Charlottetown-Hillsborough Park

Falconwood is a neighbourhood of the Canadian city of Charlottetown, Prince Edward Island.

== History ==
Falconwood is home to a community of Hungarian Canadians.

== Buildings and structures ==
- Queen Elizabeth Hospital

== Politics ==
Falconwood is part of the Charlottetown federal riding for elections to the House of Commons of Canada. Falconwood is part of Charlottetown-Hillsborough Park for elections to the Legislative Assembly of Prince Edward Island. The Falconwood ward has elected Terry Bernard to Charlottetown City Council since 2000.

== See also ==
- Neighbourhoods of Charlottetown
- List of towns in Prince Edward Island
