= Charlottetown Library Learning Centre =

Public library in the Canadian city of Charlottetown

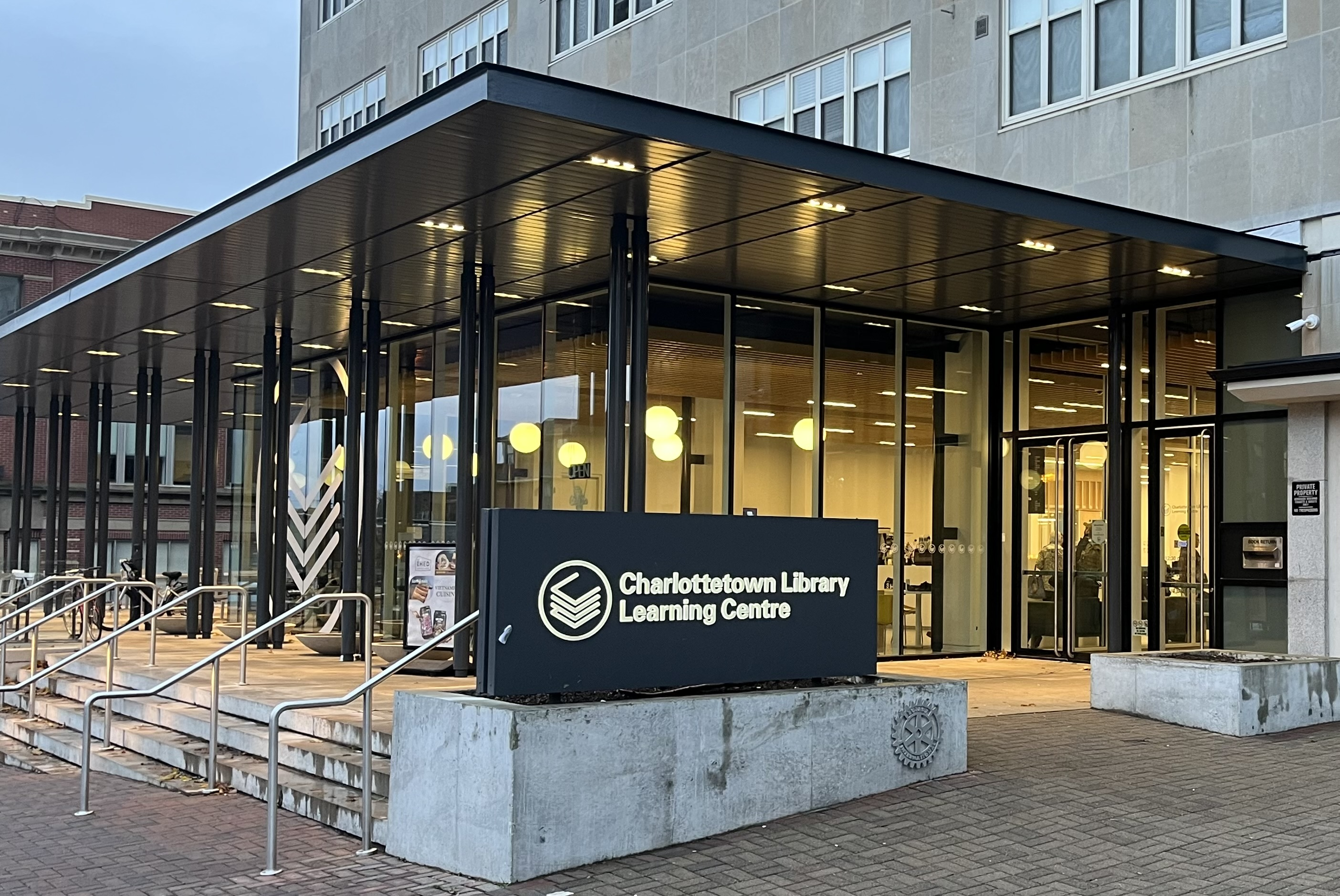
- Charlottetown Library Learning Centre
- 46.2332°N 63.1271°W
- Location: 97 Queen Street, Charlottetown, Prince Edward Island, Canada
- Type: Public Library
- Established: July 18, 2022; 3 years ago
- Service area: Downtown of Charlottetown
- Branch of: Public Library Service

Other information
- Director: Brian Howatt
- Public transit access: T3 Transit
- Website: cllcroomrentals.ca/about-us/

The Charlottetown Library Learning Centre (French: Centre d’apprentissage de la bibliothèque de Charlottetown) is a public library in Charlottetown, Prince Edward Island.

== History ==
Originally, the city's library was known as the Confederation Centre Public Library (French: La bibliothèque publique du Centre des arts de la Confédération). It situated on the southeast portion of the Confederation Centre of the Arts complex.

The Public Library served the community from 1965 until April 2022 when it was relocated to the current address in the Dominion Building and was renamed as Charlottetown Library Learning Centre.

== Architecture ==
The current Learning Centre is 42,000 square feet, more than triple the size of the old Public Library. It covers the entire ground floor of the Dominion Building in the heart of Downtown Charlottetown.

The centre has meeting and study rooms, a multipurpose auditorium, a boardroom, new maker space, a kitchen, a café shop, outdoor seating, a podcast recording booth, a gaming zone, an area for young children, programing space, and multiple technology areas with desks of computers and tablets.
