= List of Canadians of Hungarian descent =

This is a list of notable Canadians of Hungarian descent:

- Eve Adams, Canadian liberal politician (2011–2015)
- Kati Agócs – composer
- Karoly Bezdek – mathematician
- Attila Buday – Olympic canoer
- Tamas Buday Jr. – Olympic canoer
- Julius T. Csotonyi – paleoartist and illustrator
- Greyston Holt – actor
- Andrea Horwath – politician
- George Jonas – writer, poet, and journalist
- Robert Lantos – film producer
- Miklós Lente – cinematographer
- Attila Richard Lukacs – artist
- Ty Wood – actor, model
- Alanis Morissette – singer, actress, and musician
- Austin Pasztor – American football player
- William Shatner – Actor
- George Sipos – writer
- Shannon Szabados – ice hockey, goaltender for the Canadian national hockey team
- Aaron Voros – former professional ice hockey player
- Tom Wappel, Canadian liberal politician (1988–2008), staunch Social conservative
- Félix Lengyel or xQc, YouTuber and Livestreamer
- Gabor Maté, Hungarian-Canadian physician and author
- Chase Lacroix or Firefacechase YouTuber
- Vörös Twins, Canadian professional wrestlers and social media personalities
