= Hungarian Canadians =

Canadians with Hungarian ancestry

Hungarian Canadians kanadai magyarok Canadiens hongrois
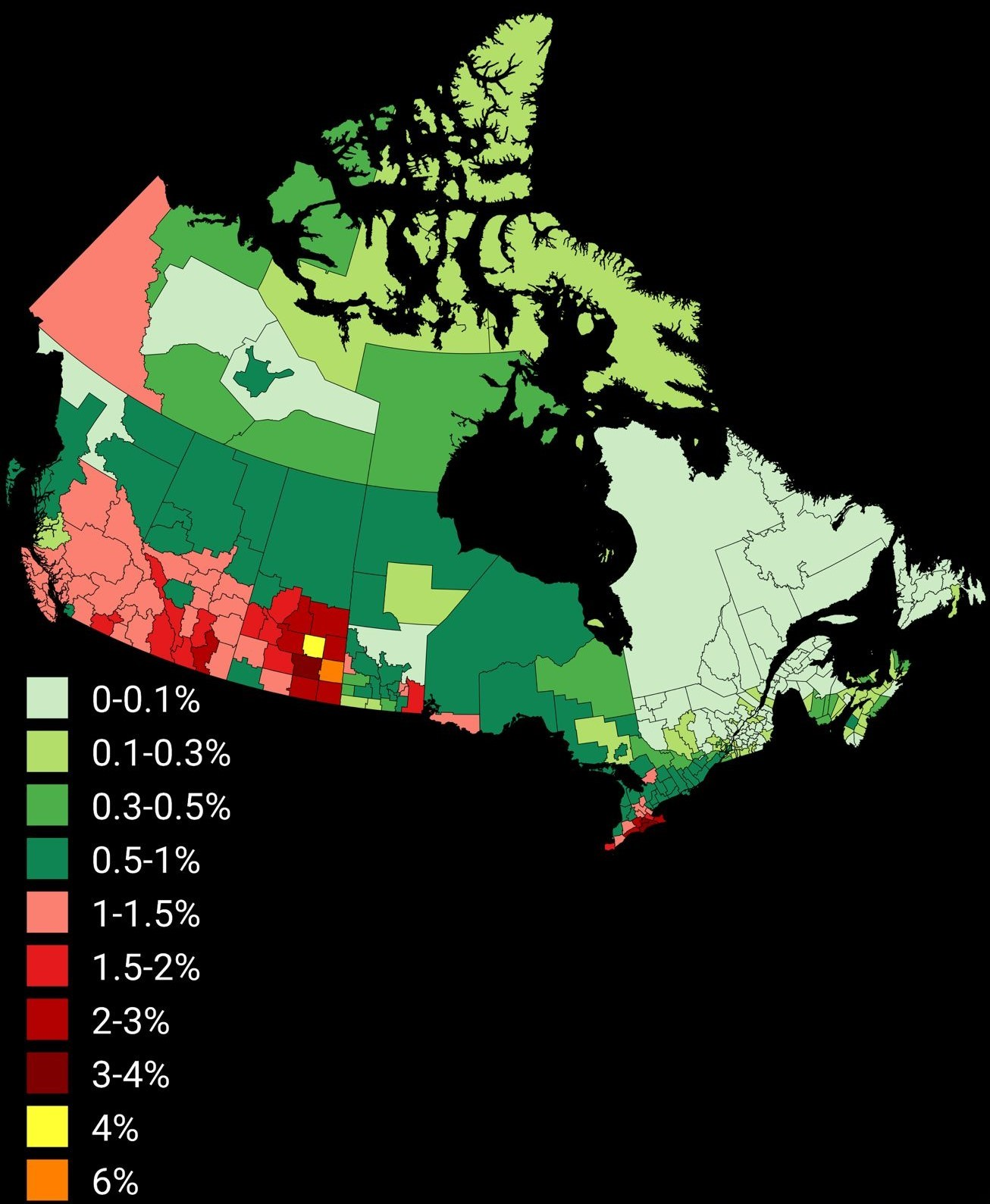
- Population distribution of Hungarian Canadians by census division, 2021 census

Total population
- 348,085 (by ancestry, 2016 Census)

Regions with significant populations
- Ontario: 163,500 (1.23%)
- British Columbia: 56,535 (1.24%)
- Alberta: 56,270 (1.41%)
- Quebec: 28,280 (0.36%)
- Saskatchewan: 27,880 (2.60%)

Languages
- Canadian English, Hungarian, Canadian French, Yiddish, Romani

Religion
- Catholic, Jewish, Reformed

Related ethnic groups
- Hungarian Americans, European Canadians

Hungarian Canadians (Hungarian: kanadai magyarok, pronounced [ˈkɒnɒdɒji ˈmɒɟɒrok]) are persons in Canada of Hungarian ancestry. According to the 2016 Census, there are 348,085 Canadians of Hungarian ancestry. The Hungarian minority is the 24th largest ethnic group of Canada. The bulk of Hungarian immigration occurred after World War II, with the wave peaking after the 1956 Hungarian revolution against communist rule, when over 100,000 Hungarian refugees went to Canada. The Hungarian Canadian community is among the country's multiple ethnicities; Canada is one of the top five countries of the Hungarian diaspora.

== Geographical distribution ==
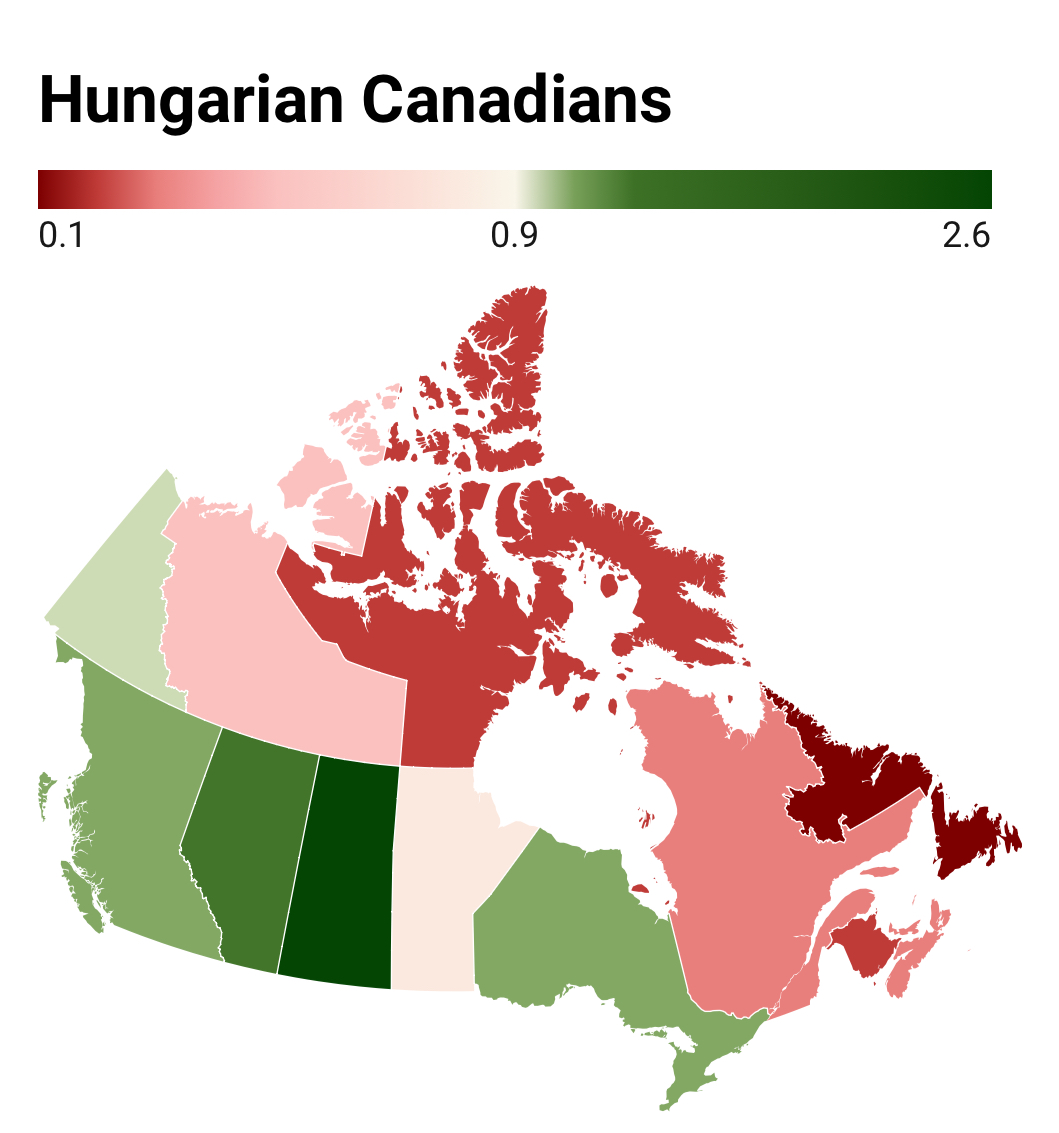
Hungarian percent in Canadian province/territory, 2021 census

=== Alberta ===
As of the 2016 Census 56,270 people (1.41% of the population) in Alberta have Hungarian roots, of which 7,660 have some knowledge of the language.

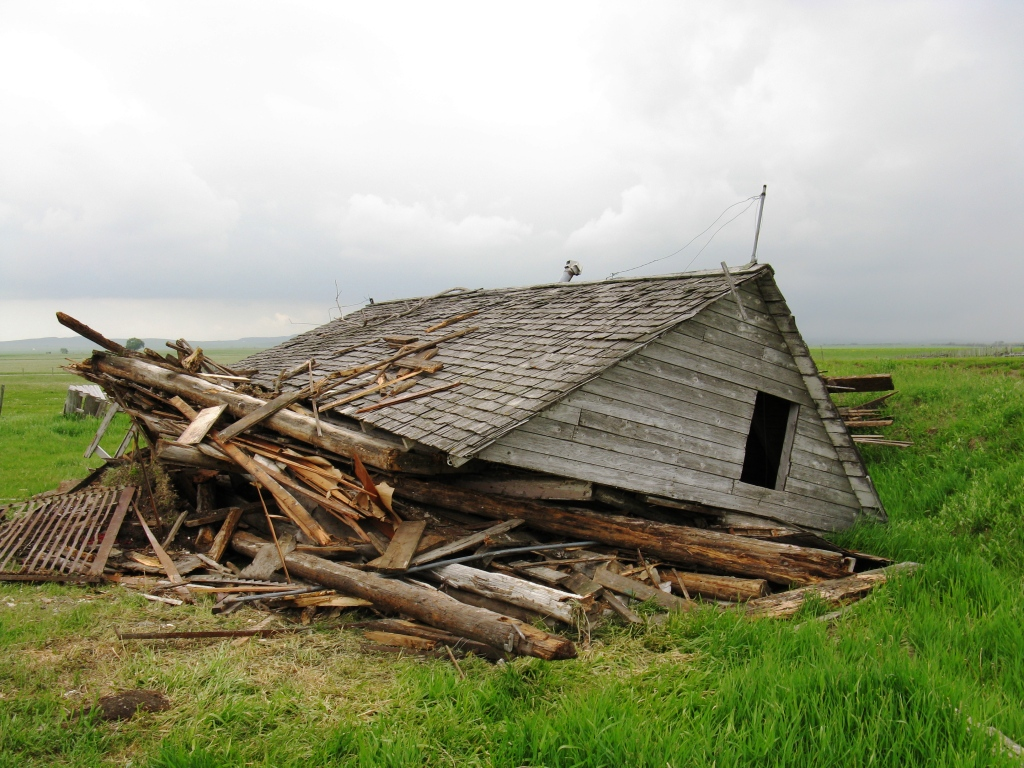
Abandoned farmstead of Steve Kapcsos in Alberta. The early Hungarian immigrants had lived in similar cabins.

The first Hungarians arrived in Alberta in 1866 with János Packh (alias Pál Oszkár Eszterházy), who wanted Hungarians that had earlier settled in Pennsylvania to re-settle in the province. The memorial of János Mráz, in 1895 in Bashaw indicated that there were already 25 Hungarian families, each of which farmed a homestead. The 1900 Census counted 167 Hungarians in the Lethbridge area.

A larger influx of immigrants into Alberta was recorded in 1914–1915. At that time 300 Hungarian labourers arrived in the area. In the 1930s there was a greater immigration wave to Alberta. In 1921, there were 1,045 Hungarians living in the province, and by 1931 this number had grown to 5,502.

=== Saskatchewan ===
The 2016 Census showed 27,880 people living in Saskatchewan who have Hungarian roots or were born in Hungary. In local, spoken Hungarian the name of the province is Saskanada.

In 1921 the Hungarian population was 8,946. By 1931 it had grown to 13,363, and by 1941 to 14,576. Because of interprovincial migration to Ontario and eastern Canada, the population declined to 12,470 by 1951. In 2001 there were 24,340 people of Hungarian ancestry living in Saskatchewan, of whom 24% (5,875 people) claimed to be born in Hungary.

Significant Hungarian populations exist in the Saskatchewan settlements of St. Benedict, Prud'homme, Yellow Creek, Zichydorf, East Central, Cudworth, Whitewood and Mistatim.

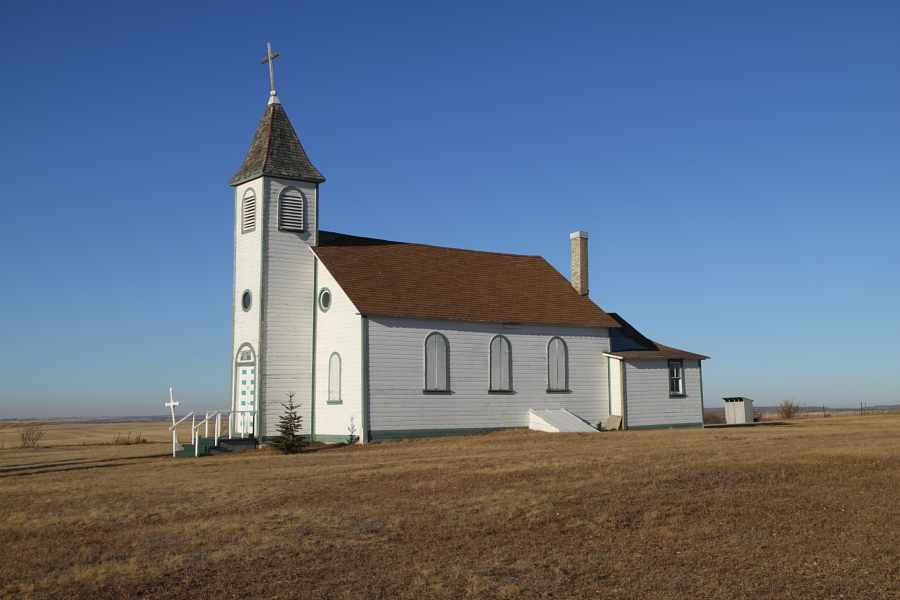
St. Laszlo Church in Prud'homme

In 1885 Hungarian immigrants established several settlements in the eastern region of Saskatchewan. One of them was the Esterhazy colony, which still exists. In 1888 a new settlement was founded near Esterhazy, which was named Kaposvár (after Kaposvár, now part of Esterhazy). By 1902 these two settlements had over 900 people. The nearby Stockholm (Sokhalom in Hungarian) also became a Hungarian settlement. In 1894 a Hungarian settlement was established by Rev. János (John) Kovács with the name Otthon, which means 'Home' in Hungarian. After 1902 somewhere around the current town of Kipling there was a settlement called Békevár ('Peaceburgh'). Later Hungarians also settled down in the northern parts of Saskatchewan, close to Wakaw, where the Buda School District was. West of Wakaw was the Dunafoldvar district (named after Dunaföldvár) and south of Wakaw was Matyasfold (Mátyásföld - 'Land of Matthew').

=== Manitoba ===
After the 2016 Census there were 10,120 people in Manitoba that have Hungarian ancestry or were born in Hungary. In 1996 there were 9,025 Hungarians living in Manitoba.

The first wave of the Hungarian immigrants reached Manitoba in 1885, many of whom settled in or near Winnipeg. In 1906 the Hungarian Presbyterian church was established there. The first Hungarian newspaper in Canada, Kanadai Magyarság ('Canadian Hungarians'), was published in Winnipeg in 1905. During the First World War, citizens of enemy allies were interned. Between 1918 and 1924 the Hungarian clubs in Winnipeg were very active. By 1920 there were 13,181 Hungarians in the country, most in Saskatchewan, with Manitoba only home to a small number. The second wave of immigration came during the inter-war years. The new immigrants established a Roman Catholic church and a Protestant church in 1924. A new newspaper was founded, Kanadai Magyar Újság ('Canadian Hungarian Newspaper'). In 1927 the Hungarian consulate was opened in Winnipeg.

=== Ontario ===
As of the 2016 Census, Ontario had 163,500 people that have Hungarian ancestry or were born in Hungary, accounting for 1.23% of the population. 54,240 Hungarians live in Toronto.

Most Hungarians lived in Welland, Windsor, Brantford and in Hamilton. In 1931, more than 1,000 Hungarians lived in Hamilton, Toronto and in Welland. There were significant Hungarian populations in Brantford, Kitchener, Oshawa, St. Catharines, Niagara Falls and in Port Colborne. Many Hungarians worked at the construction of the Welland Canal. By 1961 Hungarians accounted for 40% of the population of Welland.

After the First World War, thousands of Hungarians emigrated to Canada, especially from the rural classes. After the Second World War people from several classes came to the country. Ontario's climate was similar in some ways to the Hungarian climate so people from the Great Hungarian Plain moved to Ontario. The first Hungarians (60 people) to arrive in Welland did so in 1906. The first Hungarian society was established in Hamilton in 1907, the second was founded in Hamilton in 1913. In 1921 the Hungarian Self Culture Society was established in Welland where the first Hungarian newspaper was also published in 1928. In 1931 three quarters of the Hungarian Canadian population lived in Ontario. In 1933 two Hungarian newspapers were established by John Rapai, the Kanadai Magyar Újság and the Wellandi Kisújság. In 1949 a so-called Delhi & Tobacco District Hungarian House was dedicated in Delhi-Tillsonburg, which had been initiated by Rapai two years earlier. 40 percent (about 1,500 people) of the tobacco factory was Hungarian. After 1956 about 6,000 refugees arrived in Ontario. In 1964 a Roman Catholic church was built in London, Ontario. Roman Catholic churches are still in Toronto, Hamilton and in Welland. There are still three Greek Catholic churches in Ontario: in Welland, Windsor and in Hamilton. Presbyterian churches are in Delhi and in Ottawa.

=== Prince Edward Island ===
1956-1957 saw a large wave of Hungarian migration to Prince Edward Island, and probably the largest ever. A special Emergency Relief Committee was established to manage the arrival of Hungarian refugees, led by Minister of Health M.L. Bonnell. In addition to a reception centre which was established in the neighbourhood of Falconwood, in Charlottetown, a number of other groups participated in supporting the settlement of the Hungarians including the province's Red Cross, Women's Institute, Catholic Women's League, as well local volunteer doctors and nurses.

In general, the Hungarians were welcomed to the province, as reported by The Guardian newspaper. It was believed that the Hungarians were the "right type" of immigrant and could contribute to the province's agricultural sector.

== Religion ==
Hungarian Canadian demography by religion
Religious group	2021 (Note: Religious breakdown proportions based on "Hungarian" ethnic or cultural origin response on the 2021 census.)		2001 (Note: Religious breakdown proportions based on "Hungarian" ethnic or cultural origin response on the 2001 census.)	
Religious group	Pop.	%	Pop.	%
Christianity	170,115	53.14%	206,500	77.27%
Irreligion	133,770	41.78%	50,720	18.98%
Judaism	12,080	3.77%	8,545	3.2%
Islam	550	0.17%	225	0.08%
Buddhism	500	0.16%	350	0.13%
Hinduism	115	0.04%	45	0.02%
Indigenous spirituality	155	0.05%	215	0.08%
Sikhism	40	0.01%	15	0.01%
Other	2,825	0.88%	645	0.24%
Total Hungarian Canadian population	320,155	100%	267,255	100%

Hungarian Canadian demography by Christian sects
Religious group	2021		2001	
Religious group	Pop.	%	Pop.	%
Catholic	102,130	60.04%	125,285	60.67%
Orthodox	3,730	2.19%	2,325	1.13%
Protestant	43,305	25.46%	71,980	34.86%
Other Christian	20,950	12.32%	6,910	3.35%
Total Hungarian Canadian christian population	170,115	100%	206,500	100%

== Gallery ==
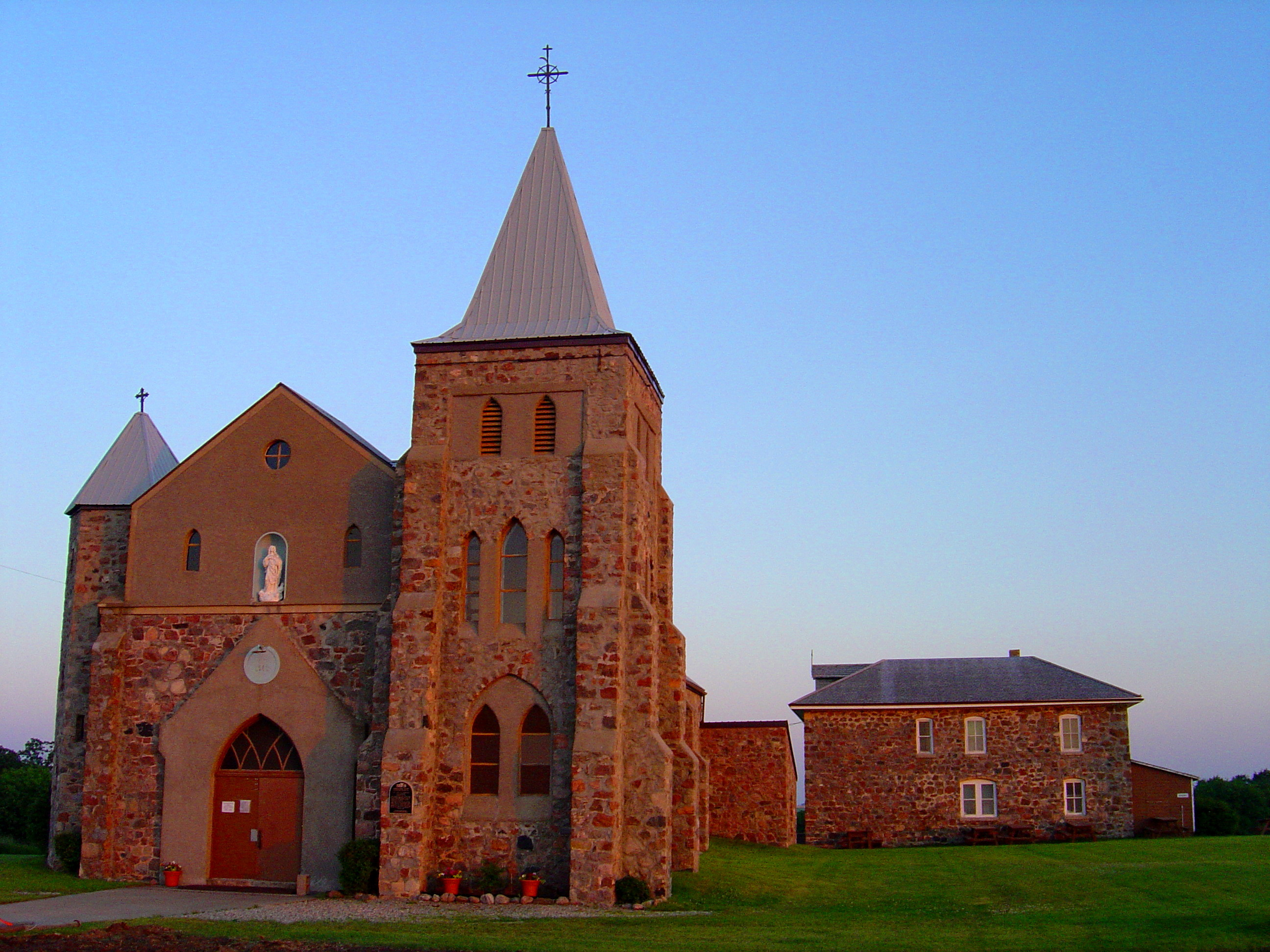
Kaposvar historical site outside of the Town of Esterhazy

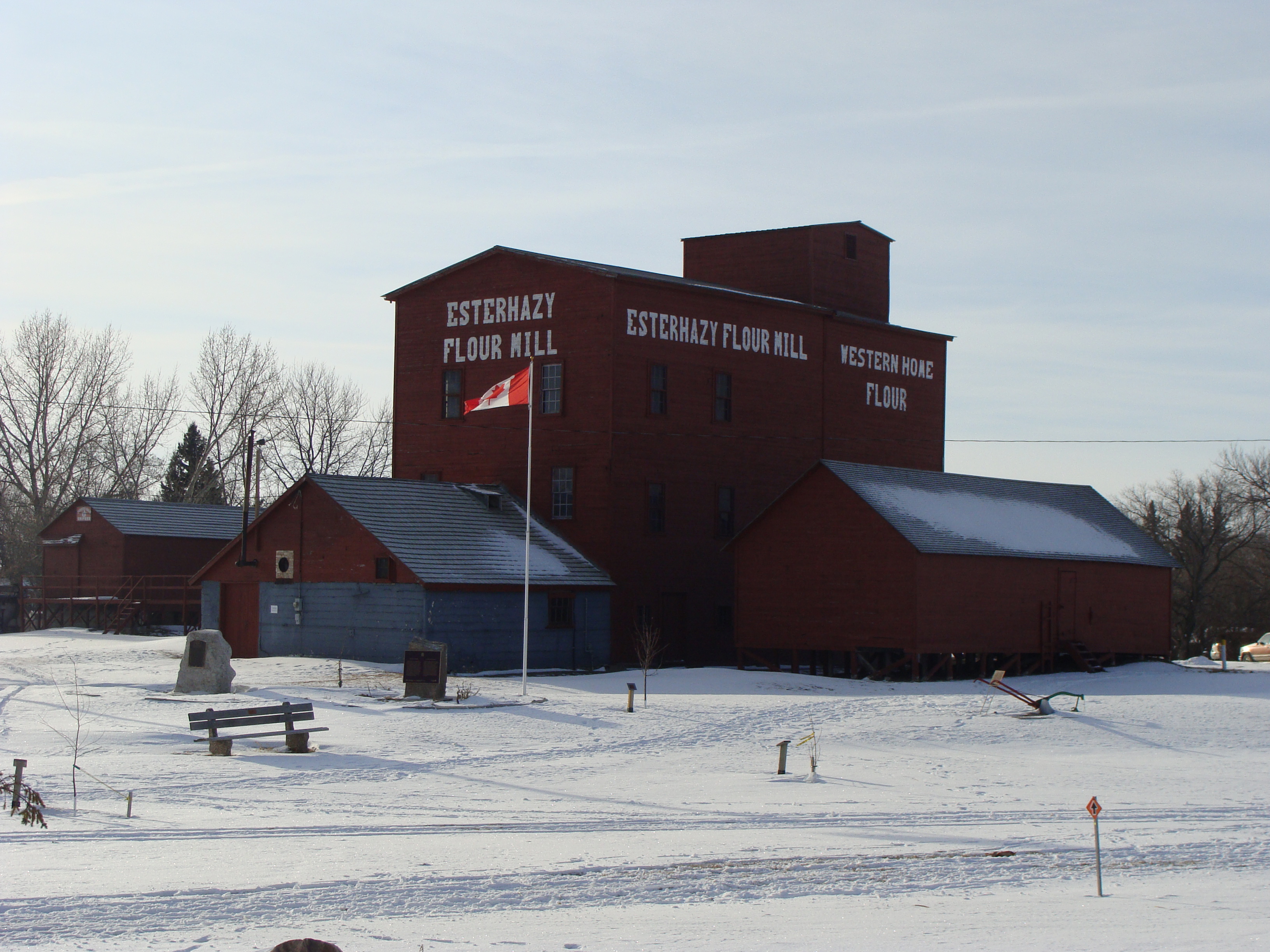
Photo of the Esterhazy Flour Mill on December 11, 2011

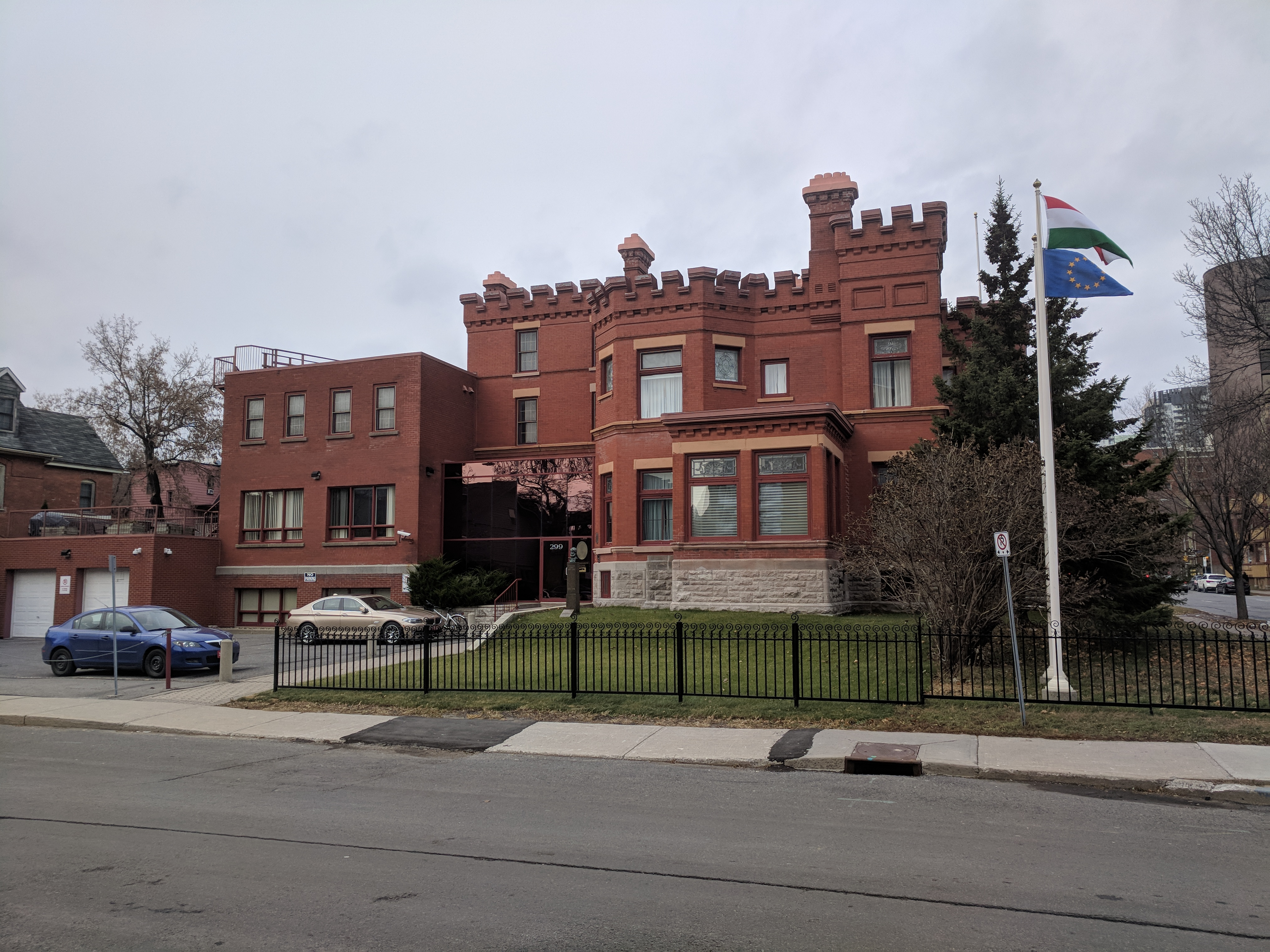
Embassy of Hungary in Ottawa, Canada

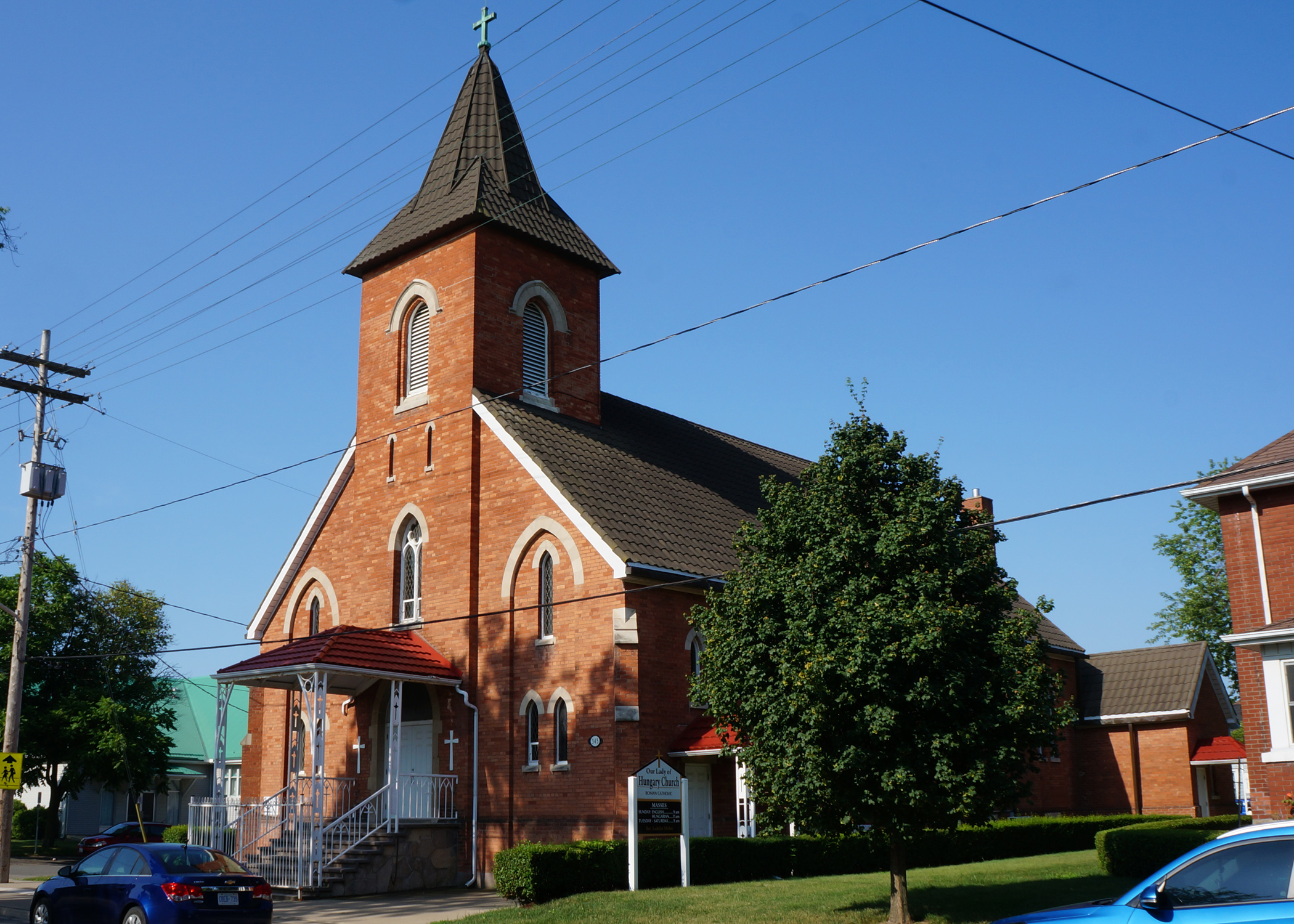
Our Lady of Hungary Roman Catholic Church in Welland, ON.

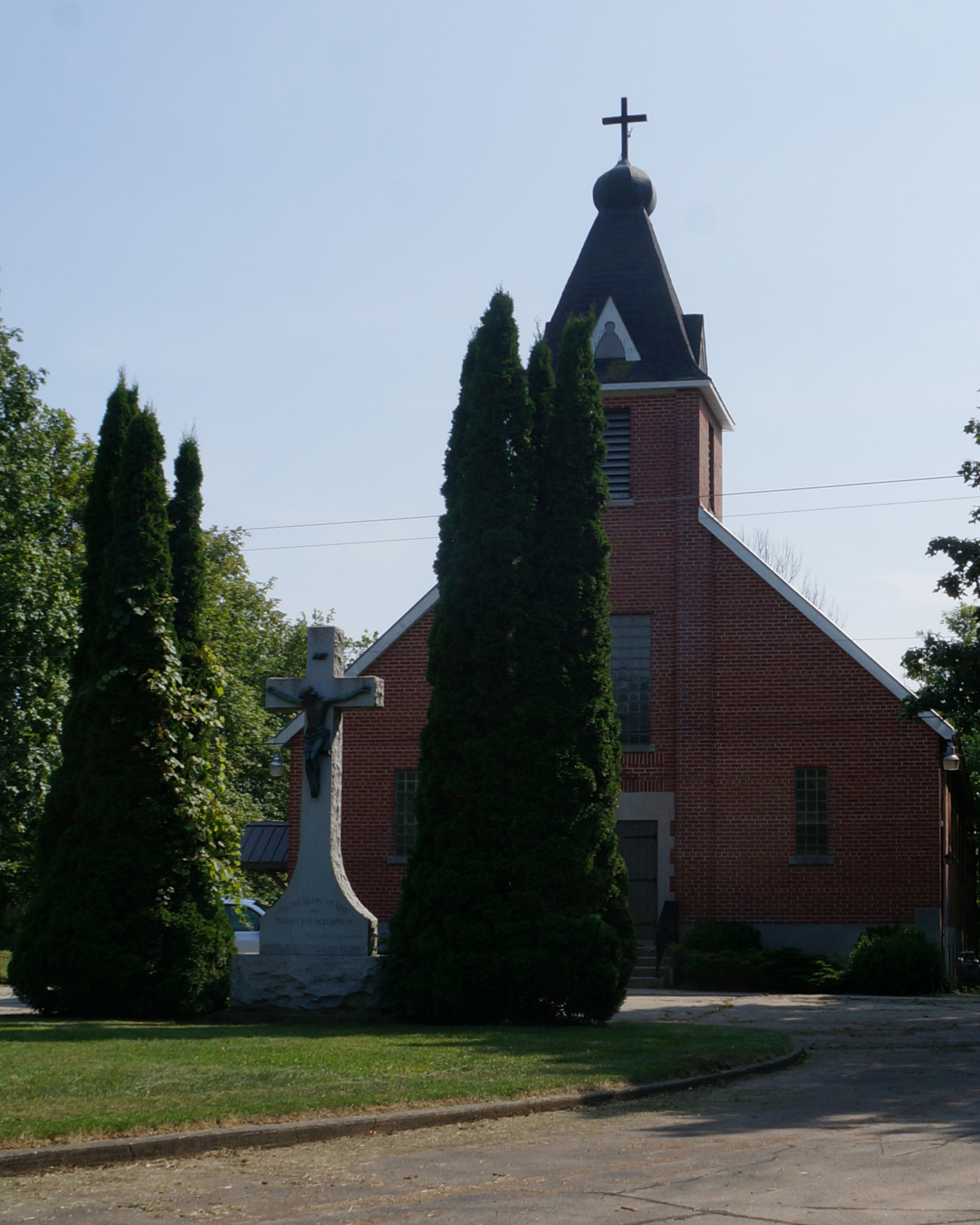
Former Greek Catholic Church of St. George in Courtland, ON.

== See also ==
- Canada–Hungary relations
- List of Canadians of Hungarian descent
- European Canadians
- Hungarian Americans
- Hungarian diaspora
