= Zichydorf, Saskatchewan =

Coordinates: 50.367633°N 104.557417°W

Zichydorf Village was a village that existed for a short period of time near Regina, Saskatchewan, Canada. The residents of Zichydorf Village mostly came from Zichydorf in Austria-Hungary (now Plandište, Serbia) before World War I. The original Zichydorf was formed in 1787 in the Banat area of southern Hungary after the expulsion of the Ottoman Empire sponsored by the Habsburgs to secure the area and further the Roman Catholic presence in Eastern Europe. The military campaign was funded by German nobles known as "Counts". One of which whose name was Count Karl Zichy de Vasonkeo who had a dorf (or village) named after him. It was a very unstable area going from Hungarian to Austrian to Yugoslavian rule over a 30-year period. A wealthy land owner, Leopold (and Annie) Amon thus wanted to move to Canada. They helped pay the way for 15 families of cousins and friends from the village to move to Canada in 1900 aboard a ship called the "Karlsburg". Leopold and Annie Amon purchased 40 acres of land a little south of Regina Saskatchewan that they called " Little Zichydorf " .The colony of German speaking Roman Catholics wanted their own school for their children, but the Regina School Board voted in favor of a new school going to neighboring Springdale. Eventually "Little Zichydorf" became part of the colony of Sprindale.
