= History of immigration to Canada =

The history of immigration to Canada details the movement of people to modern-day Canada. The modern Canadian legal regime was founded in 1867, but Canada also has legal and cultural continuity with French and British colonies in North America that go back to the 17th century, and during the colonial era, immigration was a major political and economic issue with Britain and France competing to fill their colonies with loyal settlers. Until then, the land that now makes up Canada was inhabited by many distinct Indigenous peoples for thousands of years. Indigenous peoples contributed significantly to the culture and economy of the early European colonies to which was added several waves of European immigration. More recently, the source of migrants to Canada has shifted away from Europe and towards Asia and Africa. Canada's cultural identity has evolved constantly in tandem with changes in immigration patterns.

Statistics Canada has tabulated the effect of immigration on population growth in Canada from 1851 to 2001. On average, censuses are taken every ten years, which was how Canadian censuses were first incremented between 1871 and 1901. In 1901, the Dominion Government changed its policy so that census-taking occurred every five years subsequently to document the effects of the advertising campaign that was initiated by Clifford Sifton.

In 2018, Canada received 321,035 immigrants. The top ten countries of origin, which provided 61% of those, were India (69,973), the Philippines (35,046), China (29,709), Syria (12,046), the United States (10,907), Pakistan (9,488), France (6,175), Eritrea (5,689), and the United Kingdom and its overseas territories (5,663).

== History of Canadian nationality law ==
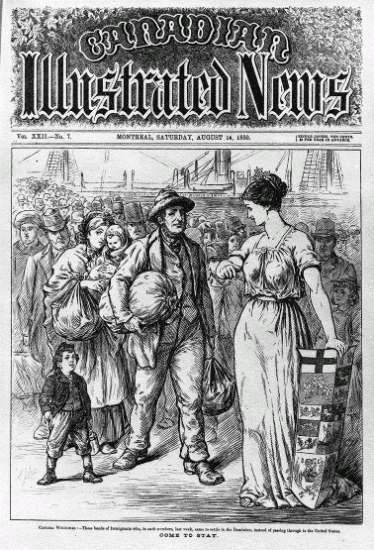
Come to Stay, printed in 1880 in the Canadian Illustrated News, refers to immigration to the "Dominion".

In 1828, during the Great Migration of Canada, Britain passed the Act to Regulate the Carrying of Passengers in Merchant Vessels, the country's first legislative recognition of its responsibility over the safety and well-being of immigrants leaving the British Isles. The act limited the number of passengers who could be carried on a ship, regulated the amount of space allocated to them and required for passengers to be supplied with adequate sustenance on the voyage. The 1828 act is now recognized as the foundation of British colonial emigration legislation.

Canadian citizenship was originally created under the Immigration Act, 1910, to designate those British subjects who were domiciled in Canada, but all other British subjects required permission to land. A separate status of 'Canadian national' was created under the Canadian Nationals Act, 1921, which defined such British subjects as being Canadian citizens, as well as their wives and children (fathered by such citizens) who had not yet landed in Canada. After the passage of the Statute of Westminster in 1931, the monarchy thus ceased to be an exclusively British institution. As result, Canadians, just as all others living among the Commonwealth realms, were known as subjects of the Crown, and the term "British subject" continued to be used in legal documents.

Canada was the second nation among what was the British Commonwealth to establish its own nationality law in 1946, with the enactment of the Canadian Citizenship Act, 1946, taking effect on January 1, 1947. To acquire Canadian citizenship from then forward, one would generally have to be a British subject on or before the act took effect; an 'Indian' or 'Eskimo'; or to have been admitted to Canada as landed immigrants before the act took effect. A British subject then was anyone from the UK or its colonies (Commonwealth countries). Acquisition and loss of British subject status before 1947 were determined by United Kingdom law (see History of British nationality law).

On February 15, 1977, Canada removed restrictions on dual citizenship. Many of the provisions to acquire or lose Canadian citizenship that existed under the 1946 legislation were repealed. Canadian citizens are in general no longer subject to involuntary loss of citizenship barring revocation on the grounds of immigration fraud or criminality. The term "Canadians of convenience" was popularized by the Canadian politician Garth Turner in 2006 in conjunction with the evacuation of Canadian citizens from Lebanon during the 2006 Israel–Lebanon conflict. It refers to people with multiple citizenship who immigrated to Canada, met the residency requirement to obtain citizenship, obtained Canadian citizenship, and moved back to their original home country while they maintained their Canadian citizenship, with those who support the term claiming they do so as a safety net.

== Regional history ==
=== Atlantic Region ===
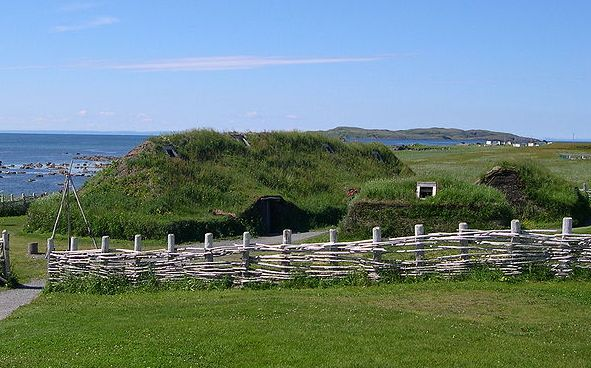
L'Anse aux Meadows on the island of Newfoundland, site of a Norsemen colony.

There are a number of reports of contact made before Columbus between the first peoples and those from other continents. The case of Viking contact is supported by the remains of a Viking settlement in L'Anse aux Meadows, Newfoundland. No archaeological traces of the settlement described by Icelandic Norseman Leifur Eiríksson as Vinland around the year 1000 have been found.

The presence of Basque cod fishermen and whalers a few years after Columbus has also been cited, with at least nine fishing outposts having been established on Labrador and Newfoundland. The largest of the settlements was the Red Bay station, with an estimated 900 people. Basque whalers may have begun fishing the Grand Banks as early as the 15th century.

The next European explorer acknowledged as landing in what is now Canada was John Cabot, who landed somewhere on the coast of North America (probably Newfoundland or Cape Breton Island) in 1497 and claimed it for King Henry VII of England. Portuguese and Spanish explorers also visited Canada, but it was the French who first began to explore further inland and set up colonies, beginning with Jacques Cartier in 1534. Under Pierre Dugua, Sieur de Mons, the first French settlement was made in 1604 in the region of New France known as Acadie on Isle Sainte-Croix, which now belongs to Maine, in the Bay of Fundy. That winter was particularly long and harsh and about half of the settlers that had accompanied Sieur de Mons died of scurvy. The following year, the French decided to move to a better-sheltered area and established a new settlement at Port-Royal. In 1608, Samuel de Champlain, established a settlement at Donnacona thaï would later grow to become Quebec City. The French claimed Canada as their own, and 6,000 settlers arrived, settling along the St. Lawrence River and in the Maritimes. Britain also had a presence in Newfoundland and, with the advent of the settlements, claimed the south of Nova Scotia as well as the areas around the Hudson Bay.

The first contact with the Europeans was disastrous for the first peoples. Explorers and traders brought European diseases, such as smallpox, which killed off entire villages. Relations varied between the settlers and the Natives. The French befriended the Huron peoples and entered into a mutually-beneficial trading relationship with them. The Iroquois, however, became dedicated opponents of the French, and warfare between the two was unrelenting, especially since the British armed the Iroquois in an effort to weaken the French.

=== Quebec ===
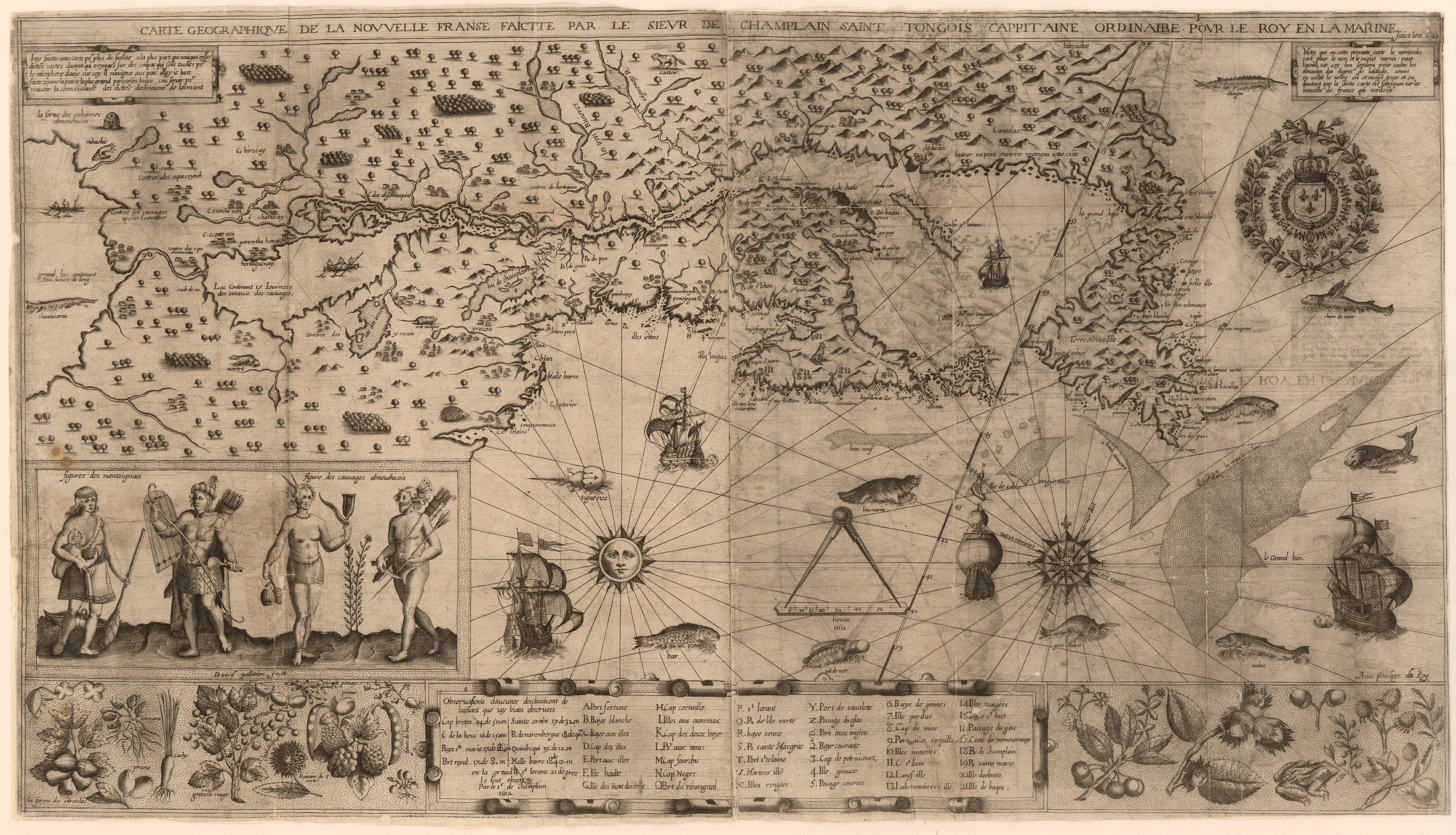
Map of New France made by Samuel de Champlain on 1612

After Samuel de Champlain's founding of Quebec City in 1608, it became the capital of New France. While the coastal communities were based upon the cod fishery, the economy of the interior revolved around beaver fur, which was popular in Europe. French voyageurs would travel into the hinterlands and trade with the natives. The voyageurs ranged throughout what is now Quebec, Ontario, and Manitoba and traded guns, gunpowder, textiles, and other European manufacturing goods with the natives for furs. The fur trade encouraged only a small population, however, as minimal labour was required. Encouraging settlement was always difficult, and some immigration occurred, but by 1760, New France had a population of only some 70,000.

New France had other problems besides low immigration. The French government had little interest or ability in supporting its colony, which was mostly left to its own devices. The economy was primitive, and much of the population was involved in little more than subsistence agriculture. The colonists also engaged in a long-running series of wars with the Iroquois.

=== Ontario ===
Étienne Brûlé explored Ontario from 1610 to 1612. In 1615, Samuel de Champlain visited Lake Huron, and French missionaries then established outposts in the region.

=== Prairie provinces ===
Rupert's Land, showing location of York Factory

In the 18th to 19th century, the only immigration that Western Canada or Rupert's Land had was early French Canadian North West Company fur traders from eastern Canada and the Scots, English Adventurers, and Explorers representing the Hudson's Bay Company who arrived via Hudson Bay. Canada became a nation in 1867, Rupert's Land became absorbed into the North-West Territories. To encourage British Columbia to join the Canadian Confederation, a transcontinental railway was proposed. The railway companies felt it was not feasible to lay track over land on which there was no settlement. The fur trading era was declining; the buffalo population disappeared, and the nomadic buffalo hunters left, which presented a possibility to increase agricultural settlement. Agricultural possibilities were first expounded by Henry Youle Hind. The Dominion government, with the guidance of Interior Minister Clifford Sifton, in charge of immigration, (1896–1905) enacted Canada's homesteading act, the Dominion Lands Act, in 1872. An extensive advertising campaign throughout Western Europe and Scandinavia brought in a huge wave of immigrants to "The Last, Best West." (In 1763, Catherine the Great issued manifesto, inviting foreigners to settle into Russia, and in 1862, the United States enacted the Homestead Act, inviting immigration.)

Ethnic or religious groups seeking asylum or independence no longer travelled to Russia or the United States, where lands were taken or homestead acts were cancelled. The Red River Colony population of Manitoba allowed it to become a Canadian province in 1870. In the 1880s, fewer than 1,000 non-Aboriginal people resided out West. The government's immigration policy was a huge success since the North-West Territories grew to a population of 56,446 in 1881, almost doubled to 98,967 in 1891, and exponentially jumped to 211,649 by 1901. Ethnic Bloc Settlements dotted the prairies, as language groupings settled together on soil types of the Canadian western prairie similar to agricultural land of their homeland. That way immigration was successful; new settlements could grow because of common communication and learned agricultural methods. the Canadian Pacific Railway transcontinental railway was finished in 1885.

Immigration briefly ceased to the West during the North-West Rebellion of 1885. Various investors and companies were involved in the sale of railway (and some non-railway) lands. Sifton himself may have been involved as an investor in some of the ventures. The populations of Saskatchewan and Alberta were eligible for provincial status in 1905. Immigration continued to increase through to the roaring twenties. A mass exodus affected the prairies during the Dirty Thirties and the Great Depression, and the prairies have never again regained the impetus of the immigration wave seen in the early 20th century.

=== British Columbia ===
Until the railway, immigration to British Columbia was via sea, or (the gold rushes were under way) via overland travel from California and other parts of the US, as there was no usable route westward beyond the Rockies, and travel on the Prairies and across the Canadian Shield was still water-borne. The very small early non-native population of BC was mostly French-Canadian and Metis fur-company employees, their British (largely Scottish) administrators and bosses, and a population of Kanakas (Hawaiians) in the company's employ, as well as members of various Iroquoian peoples, who were also in the service of the fur company. The non-local native population of the British Pacific was from 150 to 300 until the advent of the Fraser Gold Rush in 1857, when Victoria'ss population swelled to 30,000 in four weeks and towns of 10,000, and more appeared at remote locations on the Mainland, at Yale, Port Douglas, and Lillooet (then called Cayoosh Flat). The wave of settlement was nearly entirely from California and was approximately one third Americans, one third Chinese, and one third various Europeans and others. Nearly all had been in California for many years, including the early Canadians and Maritimers who made the journey north to the new Gold Colony, as British Columbia was often called.

One group of about 60, called the Overlanders of '62, made the journey from Canada via Rupert's Land during the Cariboo Gold Rush but was the exception to the rule. An earlier attempt to move some of the settlers of the Selkirk Colony ended in disaster at Dalles des Morts, near present-day Revelstoke. Early immigration to British Columbia was from all nations, largely via California, and included Germans, Scandinavians, Maritimers, Australians, Poles, Italians, French, Belgians, and others, as well as Chinese and Americans, who were the largest groups to arrive in the years around the time of the founding of the Mainland Colony in 1858. Most of the early Americans left in the early 1860s because of the American Civil War and their pursuit of other gold rushes in Idaho, Colorado, and Nevada, but Americans have remained a major component in the settler population ever since. I n the 1860s, in conjunction with the Cariboo Gold Rush and agitation to join Canada, more and more Canadians, including the Overlanders, who became influential, arrived and became a force in the local polity, which had been dominated by Britons favouring separate rule, and they helped contribute towards the agenda for annexation with Canada. After the opening of the CPR, a new wave of immigration led not just to the creation of Vancouver and other newer urban settlements, but also to the settlement of numerous regions in the Interior, especially the Okanagan, Boundary, Shuswap, and Kootenays. A similar wave of settlement and development accompanied the opening of the Grand Trunk Pacific Railway (today the Canadian National Railway) through the Central Interior, which was also the impetus for the creation of the city of Prince George and the port of Prince Rupert.

==== Head tax and Chinese Immigration Act of 1923 ====
The first immigrants from China to Canada came from California to the Fraser Canyon Gold Rush in British Columbia in 1858; immigrants directly from China did not arrive until 1859. The Chinese were a significant part of nearly all the British Columbia gold rushes, and most towns in BC had large Chinese populations, often a third of the total or more. Chinese labourers were hired to help with the construction of the Cariboo Wagon Road and Alexandra Bridge as well as the Douglas Road and other routes. Chinese miners, merchants, and ranchers enjoyed full rights to mineral tenure and land alienation and in some areas became the mainstay of the local economy for decades. The Chinese, for instance, owned 60% of the land in the Lillooet Land District in the 1870s and 1880s and held the majority of working claims on the Fraser River and in other areas. The next wave of immigrants from China were labourers brought in to help build the Canadian Pacific Railway, a transcontinental railway, but many defected to the goldfields of the Cariboo and other mining districts. In the year that the railway was completed, the Chinese Immigration Act of 1885 was enacted, and a head tax was levied to control the ongoing influx of labour although immigration continued as corporate interests in BC preferred to hire the cheaper labour that was made available to them by Chinese labour contractors. Chinese labour was brought in by the Dunsmuir coal interests and used to break the back of strikers at Cumberland in the Comox Valley, which then became one of British Columbia's largest Chinatowns, as white workers who lived there were displaced by armed force.

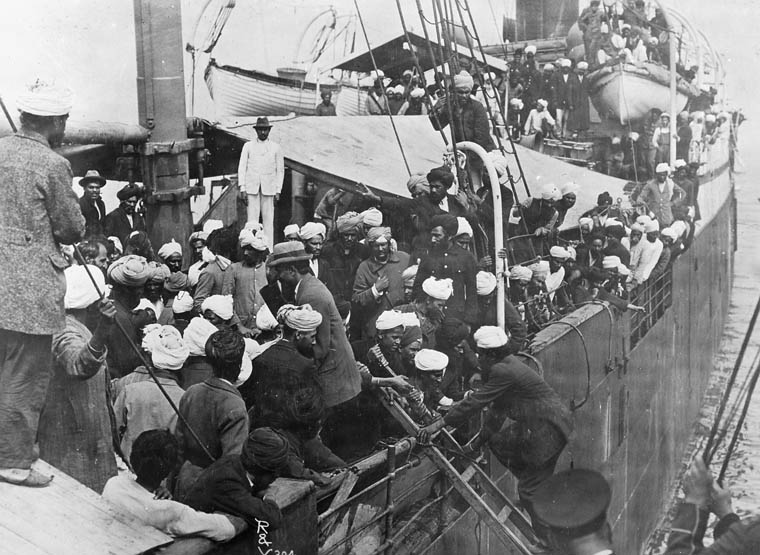
Sikhs aboard the Komagata Maru in Vancouver's Burrard Inlet, 1914

==== Indian immigration and Continuous Journey Regulation of 1908 ====
The Canadian government's first attempt to restrict immigration from India was to pass an order-in-council on January 8, 1908, that prohibited immigration of persons who "in the opinion of the Minister of the Interior" did not "come from the country of their birth or citizenship by a continuous journey and or through tickets purchased before leaving their country of their birth or nationality." In practice, that applied only to ships that began their voyage in India, as the great distance usually necessitated a stopover in Japan or Hawaii. The regulations came at a time while Canada was accepting massive numbers of immigrants (over 400,000 in 1913 alone), almost all of whom came from Europe. Gurdit Singh was apparently aware of regulations when he chartered the Komagata Maru in January 1914, but he continued with his purported goal of challenging these exclusion laws in order to have a better life. The Komagata Maru, a Japanese steamship that sailed from Hong Kong to Shanghai, China; Yokohama, Japan; and then to Vancouver, British Columbia, Canada, in 1914, carried 376 passengers from Punjab, India. The passengers were not allowed to land in Canada, and the ship was forced to return to India. The passengers consisted of 340 Sikhs, 24 Muslims, and 12 Hindus, all of whom were British subjects. That was one of several incidents in the early 20th century involving exclusion laws in Canada and the United States designed to keep out immigrants of Asian origin. Times have now changed, and India has become the largest source of immigrants for Canada. In 2019, India topped the list of immigrants admitted to Canada. Canada welcomed 85,590 Indian nationals, followed by 30,245 from China and 27,820 from the Philippines.

== Early European settlements ==
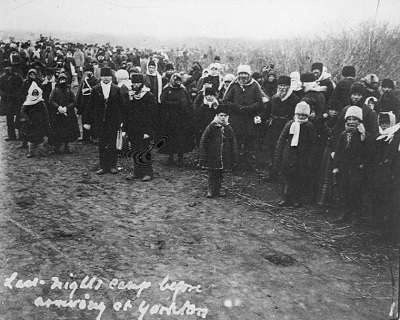
Doukhobor immigrants at a camp on way to Yorkton, Assiniboia District, North-West Territories (1899).

=== German colonists and settlement ===
German colonists, like the Scandinavians, were among the earliest to arrive from California and established themselves beyond mining in areas such as ranching and construction and specialized trades. Until World War I, Vancouver was a major centre of German investment and social life, and German was commonly heard on the city's streets and bars. The Germans remained the largest non-British group in the province until they were eclipsed in that capacity by the Chinese in the 1980s.

=== Doukhobor settlement and communities ===
The Doukhobors were assisted in their immigration by Count Leo Tolstoy, who admired them for their collectivist lifestyle, beliefs, ardent pacifism, and freedom from materialism. Originally settled in Saskatchewan and resistant to the government's desire to send their children to public school and other matters, they migrated en masse to British Columbia to settle in the West Kootenay and Boundary regions.

== Waves of migration ==
=== Great Migration ===
The Great Migration of Canada (also known as the Great Migration from Britain) was a period of high immigration to Canada from 1815 to 1850 involving over 800,000 immigrants chiefly from the British Isles. Unlike the late 19th and early 20th centuries, when organized immigration schemes brought in many of the new immigrants to Canada, this period of immigration was driven by demand, based on the need for infrastructure labour in the burgeoning colonies, the filling of new rural settlements, and the poor conditions in some source places such the Highland Clearances in Scotland and later the Great Famine of Ireland. Europe was overall becoming richer through the Industrial Revolution, but steep population growth made the relative number of jobs low, and overcrowded conditions forced many to look to North America for economic success.

=== Immigration to the West ===
Attempts to form permanent settlement colonies west of the Great Lakes were beset by difficulty and isolation until the building of the Canadian Pacific Railway and the second of the two Riel Rebellions. Despite the railway making the region more accessible, there were fears that a tide of settlers from the United States might overrun the British territory. In 1896, Interior Minister Clifford Sifton launched a program of settlement with offices and advertising in the United Kingdom and Continental Europe. That began a major wave of railway-based immigration, which created the farms, towns, and cities of the Prairie Provinces.

=== Third wave (1890–1920) and fourth wave (1940s–1960s) ===
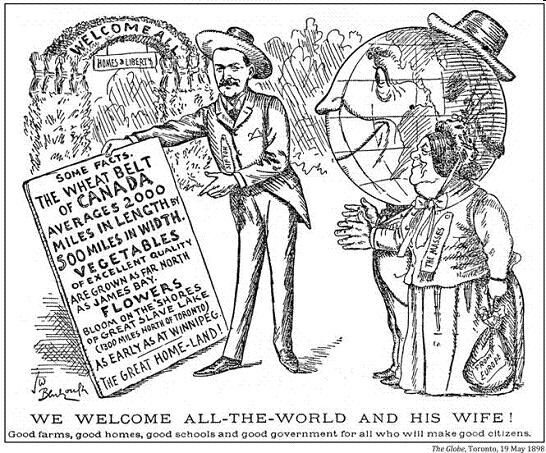
The government promoted cheap wheat lands in the Prairies in 1898.

The third wave of immigration to Canada came mostly from Continental Europe and peaked prior to World War I, between 1911 and 1913 (over 400,000 in 1912), many from Eastern or Southern Europe. The fourth wave came from Europe after the World War II and peaked at 282,000 in 1957. Many were from Italy and Portugal. Deeply entrenched antisemitism in Canada, particularly in Quebec, was evident in the country's exceptionally restrictive record in accepting Jewish refugees from Nazism between 1933 and 1945. Pier 21, in Halifax, Nova Scotia, was an influential port for European immigration and received 471,940 Italians between 1928 until it ceased operations in 1971. That made Italians the third largest ethnic group to immigrate to Canada during the time period. Together, they made Canada a more multiethnic country with substantial non-British or non-French European elements. For example, Ukrainian Canadians accounted for the largest Ukrainian population outside Ukraine and Russia. The Church of England took up the role of introducing British values to farmers newly arrived on the prairies, but in practice, the migrants mostly clung to their traditional religious affiliations.

Periods of low immigration have also occurred. International movement was very difficult during the world wars, and there was a lack of jobs during the Great Depression in Canada.

Canadianization was a high priority for new arrivals lacking a British cultural background. Immigrants from Britain were given highest priority. There was no special effort to attract francophone immigrants. In terms of economic opportunity, Canada was most attractive to farmers headed to the Prairies, who typically came from Eastern and Central Europe. Immigrants from Britain preferred urban life.

=== Fifth wave (1970s–present) ===
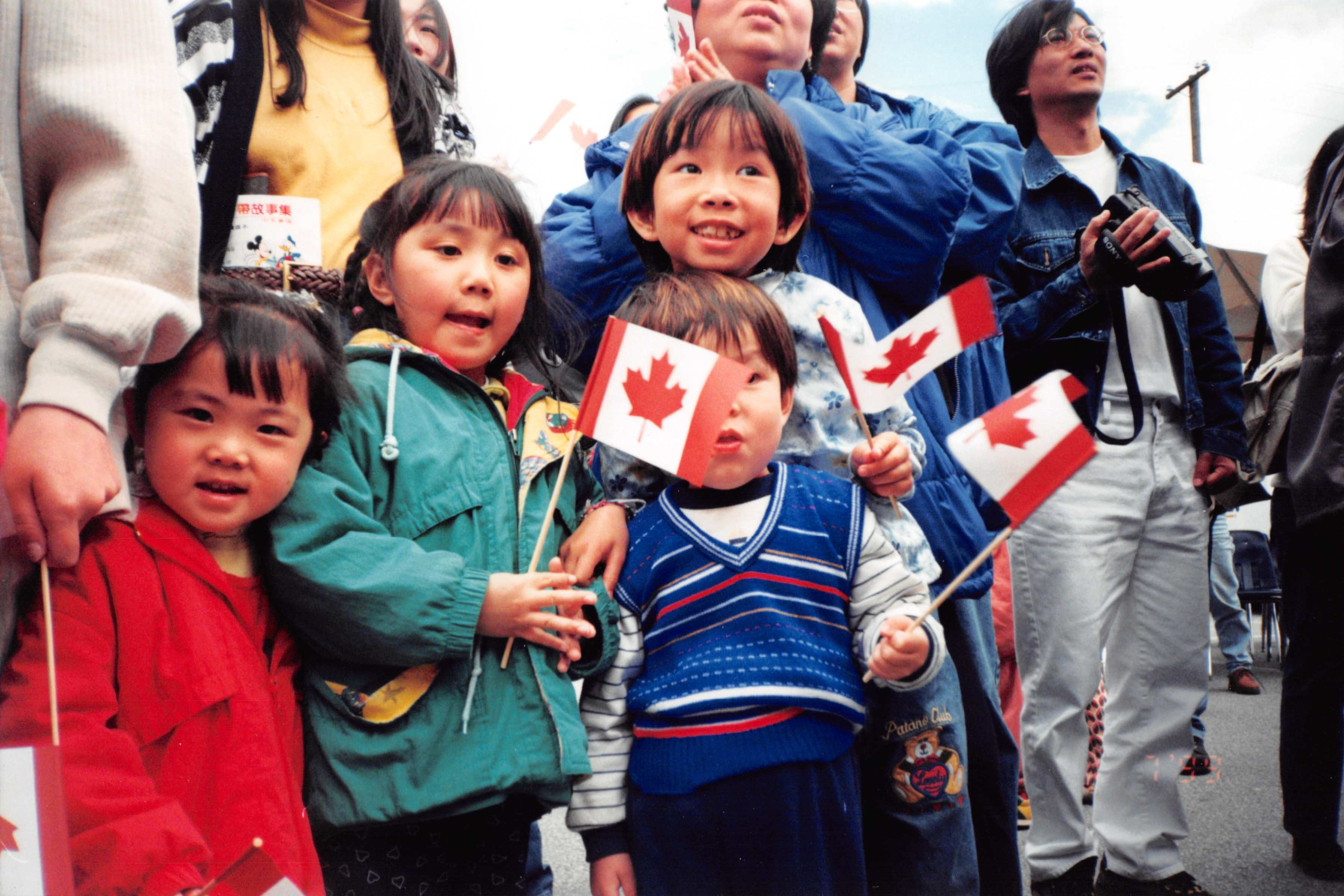
Fifth-wave Canadian children celebrating Canada Day, Vancouver, 1 July 1999

Immigration since the 1970s has overwhelmingly been of visible minorities from the developing world. That was largely influenced in 1976, when the Immigration Act was revised and has continued to be official government policy. During Brian Mulroney's government, immigration levels were increased. By the late 1980s, the fifth wave of immigration had been maintained with slight fluctuations since (225,000–275,000 annually). Currently, most immigrants come from South Asia, China, and the Caribbean, a trend that is expected to continue.

== History of immigration legislations ==
The following is the chronology of Canadian immigration and citizenship laws.

- Naturalization Act (May 22, 1868 - December 31, 1946). All Canadians born inside and outside Canada, were subject to the crown or "British Subjects".
- Canadian Citizenship Act (January 1, 1947). This act legitimized and acknowledged Canadian citizenship.
- Citizenship Act (February 15, 1977). This act recognized dual citizenship and abolished "special treatment" to the British subjects.
- Bill C-14: An Act to amend the Citizenship Act with clauses for Adopted Children (December 23, 2007). An act which provided that adopted children will automatically acquire Canadian citizenship without going through the application for permanent resident stage.
- Bill C-37: An Act to amend the Citizenship Act (April 17, 2009). An act intended to limit the citizenship privilege to first generation only and gave the opportunity to Canadian citizens to re-acquire their citizenship, hence, repealing provisions from former legislation.
- Bill C-24: Strengthening the Canadian Citizenship Act (Royal Assent: June 19, 2014; Came into force: June 11, 2015). "The Act contains a range of legislative amendments to further improve the citizenship program."
- Bill C-6: An Act to amend the Citizenship Act (Royal Assent: June 19, 2017; Came into force: October 11, 2017). This act will give "stateless" person an opportunity to be granted with Canadian citizenship which "statelessness" is considered as a legal ground for granting such privilege. This is only one of the many changes included in this new amendment of the Citizenship Act.

== See also ==
- Canada immigration statistics
- Annual immigration statistics of Canada
- Immigration to Canada
- History of Chinese immigration to Canada
- Population of Canada by year
- 1666 census of New France
- Petworth Emigration Scheme
