= Local government in Canada =

Elected local authorities in Canada

Local government in Canada can be defined as all elected local authorities which are legally empowered to make decisions on behalf of its electors, excluding the federal government, provincial and territorial governments, and First Nations, Métis and Inuit governments. This can include municipalities, school boards, health authorities, and so on.

The most prominent form of local government in Canada is municipal government(most common form of local government), which is a local council authority which provides local services, facilities, safety and infrastructure for communities. Municipal governments are local general-purpose authorities which provide services to all residents within a defined geographic area called a municipality.

According to Section 92(8) of the Constitution Act, 1867, "In each Province the Legislature may exclusively make Laws in relation to … Municipal Institutions in the Province." There are about 3,700 municipal governments in Canada. Municipal governments are established under provincial/territorial authority.

The powers granted to municipal governments are delegated by each of the provinces and territories of Canada according to governing legislation. Therefore, the legislation passed by municipalities has the status of subordinate legislation under provincial and territorial jurisdiction. However, rather than being "mere 'creatures of the provinces,'" municipal governments are "democratically elected by members of the general public and are accountable to their constituents in a manner analogous to that in which Parliament and the provincial legislatures are accountable to the electorates." Therefore, while municipalities do not have independent constitutional status, they are considered a separate level of government.

== Municipal government ==
The organisation of local government is complex. For instance, in some provinces there are several tiers of local government: regional governments, county governments and municipal governments. There are also special service districts in some unincorporated areas. Municipal local governments take various forms including cities, towns and villages. There are also innumerable specific purpose authorities.

In Ontario alone there are at least 2000 of these bodies, including 'police commissions, health units, conservation authorities, public utilities commissions, parks boards and school boards.’ Schools are usually provided locally by school boards, with the 'school trustees' being elected.

=== Regional municipalities ===
In some provinces, several municipalities in a particular area are also part of an upper tier of municipal government, which provides more regionally oriented services. Depending on the province, this second tier may be called a county, regional municipality, regional district or regional county municipality.

In Nova Scotia, three municipalities are designated as "regional municipalities". A regional municipality is a single municipal government covering an entire historical county including all formerly incorporated towns and cities within the county. Within the three regional municipalities, designations such as "city" and "town" exist only as informal signifiers for historically chartered towns and cities that used to exist prior to the establishment of the regional municipality.

=== Local municipalities ===
In Canada, the types of municipal government vary between provinces, although they all perform the same functions. The general hierarchy was established in 1849 with the passing of the Municipal Corporations Act in United Canada. The largest municipalities are usually called cities, and their governments, city councils. Smaller governments are commonly called towns, villages, parishes, rural municipalities, townships or hamlets. Some may also be directly designated as municipalities rather than as a particular type of municipality, but this term is still considered inclusive of all local governments regardless of their status.

The term "borough" was previously used in Metropolitan Toronto, Ontario, to denote suburban municipalities. The Borough of East York was the last municipality to hold this status, relinquishing it upon becoming part of the City of Toronto on January 1, 1998.

In Quebec, there is no legal distinction between cities and towns – although an informal and subjective distinction may be observed by English speakers, legally all "cities" and "towns" in Quebec have the same status of ville.

=== Sub-local divisions ===
In Quebec, the term borough is generally used as the English translation of arrondissement, referring to an administrative division of a municipality. Only eight municipalities in Quebec are divided into boroughs. (See List of boroughs in Quebec.)

=== Unincorporated areas ===
Some areas in Canada are unincorporated, meaning that they do not have a municipal government at all. Any government services in an unincorporated area are provided either by a local agency, such as a Local services board or local service district, or by the province itself.

== Powers and functions ==
While many municipal governments have different functions to others (urban vs. rural vs specialized etc.), and vary from province to province, most of the services and functions they perform are effectively the same. Functions of municipal governments can include:

- Management of the local policing and firefighting stations. Whilst this sometimes comes under the jurisdiction of the provincial government, there is often municipal police and fire services.
- Transportation. Whilst municipal governments may not be responsible for provincial and federally designated highways, roads may come under their control. Additionally, municipal governments may operate local transit services.
- Education management or funding school boards. In many municipalities, the school board is voted by the people and funded by the municipal government itself from the taxes it collects.
- Planning and development. Municipal government is responsible for local planning and approvals based on legislative requirements. They are also responsible for enforcing compliance with local requirements.
- Finance and collecting municipality taxes. Most municipalities (with the exception of some rural ones) have the power to collect taxes in order to provide the services mentioned in this list. Almost 10% of the national GDP is spent on municipal government services, and when the government is not funded by the provincial government, taxes need to be imposed.
- Public utilities and other services. Usually, parks are taken care of by the municipal government and occasionally sewerage, water, etc.
- In Quebec, Ontario and Alberta the range of local government services is broadened to include electricity, telephone and gas services.

== Structure and funding ==
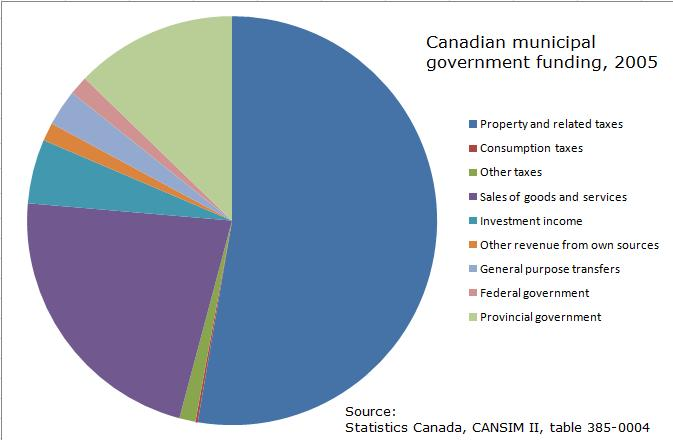
Municipal government funding sources, 2005

Most local governments are formed by a charter or act granted by the province or territory. Local governments are not mentioned in the Canadian Constitution other than to say they are the responsibility of the provinces. Consequently, municipalities can be created, amalgamated, or disbanded by the provincial government. Mayors frequently interact with their federal and provincial counterparts over areas of shared responsibility. The federal government does fund quite a few projects in many cities, like major transit and roads. These funds come from a variety of federal programs like P3 Canada, where a private company/consortia does a percentage of a project, construction, operations, maintenance, financing and designing, the Building Canada Fund, where major projects can receive federal funds for a project. Unlike many US projects and cities, most projects only get approximately a quarter of their funds from the federal government, and they are not obligated to have a certain amount of the work done by Canadians or Canadian companies.

Since each province is responsible for creating local governments in its own territory, the names, functions, and powers of local bodies vary widely across the country. Local governments generally have limited powers, namely creating local by-laws and taxation (property tax).

Typically, a municipal government is made up of one mayor (occasionally reeve or warden) and a set number of councillors (occasionally alderman). There are usually 10−20 councillors in one council; however, an exception to this is Montreal, with over 50 councillors. The councillors may represent districts called wards.

In Canada, 83% of the municipal government revenue is raised through their own sources, and legally their accounts cannot go into deficit, safeguarding the provinces from unintentionally guaranteeing their municipal governments' debts. The majority of funding for Canadian municipal governments comes from property taxes. Additional funding sources include the sale of goods and services, fines and tax transfers from the provincial government.

== Elections ==
Due to the control that the provinces have over their municipal governments, terms that councillors serve vary from province to province. Unlike most provincial elections, municipal elections are usually held on a fixed date.

=== Dates of elections by province and territory ===
Province or Territory		Occurrence	Date	Last election	Next election	Elections
Alberta	All municipalities excluding Lloydminster	4 years	3rd Monday in October	2025	2029	List
Alberta	Lloydminster	4 years	2nd Wednesday in November	2024	2028	List
British Columbia		4 years	3rd Saturday in October	2026	2030	List
Manitoba		4 years	4th Wednesday in October	2026	2030	List
New Brunswick		4 years	2nd Monday in May	2026	2030	List
Newfoundland and Labrador		4 years	Last Tuesday in September	2025	2029	List
Northwest Territories	Charter Community of Fort Good Hope	2 years	3rd Monday in July	2025	2027	List
Northwest Territories	Hamlets	2–3 years (staggered)	2nd Monday in December	2025	2026	List
Northwest Territories	Taxed communities other than Yellowknife	3 years	3rd Monday in October	2024	2027	List
Northwest Territories	Tłı̨chǫ communities	4 years	2nd Monday in June	2025	2029	List
Northwest Territories	Yellowknife	4 years	3rd Monday in October	2026	2030	List
Nova Scotia		4 years	3rd Saturday in October	2024	2028	List
Nunavut		4 years	4th Monday in October	2023	2027	List
Ontario		4 years	4th Monday in October	2026	2030	List
Prince Edward Island		4 years	1st Monday in November	2026	2030	List
Quebec		4 years	1st Sunday in November	2025	2029	List
Saskatchewan	Cities, towns, and villages	4 years	2nd Wednesday in November	2024	2028	List
Saskatchewan	Northern municipalities	4 years	Varies by municipality (Note: Provincial legislation allows the northern municipalities to each schedule their elections on a variety of date options in the Fall.)	2024	2028	List
Saskatchewan	Resort villages	4 years	Last Saturday in July	2024	2028	List
Saskatchewan	Rural municipalities (even-numbered districts)	4 years	2nd Wednesday in November	2022	2026	List
Saskatchewan	Rural municipalities (reeves and odd-numbered districts)	4 years	2nd Wednesday in November	2024	2028	List
Yukon		4 years	3rd Thursday in October	2024	2028	List

== History ==
Like many Canadian political institutions, the municipal government has its roots in the medieval system of government in England. Famously, the city of Winchester was given its charter in 1185, and the granting of freedoms became endorsed in Magna Carta, which was signed in 1215. The first formal municipality in Canada was the city of Saint John in New Brunswick, which received royal approval in 1785. For municipal government, this began an almost 50-year hiatus of receiving approval from the government, ending in the 1830s when the issue was placed on the agenda once again. In 1835, the British parliament passed the Municipal Corporations Act, which specified how municipalities were to function and be elected. The ideas from this law were transferred to Canada by Lord Durham, who submitted a report to then-Governor General, Lord Sydenham. In late 1840 to early 1841, the governments of what was Canada at the time enacted various acts which established municipal government in all areas of the country.

In 1849, the Legislative Assembly of the Province of Canada approved a Canadian version of the Municipal Corporations Act, often referred to as the Baldwin Act in honour of its creator, Robert Baldwin. It delegated authority to the municipal governments so they could raise taxes and enact by-laws. It also established a hierarchy of types of municipal governments, starting at the top with cities and continued down past towns, villages and finally townships. Changes to the boundaries of these new governments could be made by petitioning the provincial Municipal Board or by requesting a change through the legislature.

By the early 20th century, Canada was deeply involved in a period of municipal reform. An attempt to distinguish municipal government from the provincial legislature occurred, and the municipal governments were compared with a board of directors – this form of government was not for advancing a certain political party's view, it was for sitting down and running it 'like a business'. As such, the idea that a larger municipality should have more councillors was the same as having a large board of directors for a larger company, i.e., not functionally possible.

Between the 1920s and the 1960s, the municipalities received increased funding from their provincial government parents. This was partly due to the Great Depression, but further discussion about reform reared its head in the 1970s. In many cities, the system of having a few very large wards encompassing many different walks of life was replaced with one ward for every area with different demographics; this was to ensure that councillors would not have conflicting interests between the well-off and those not so. The arguments over municipal government reform continue, seen in the recent City of Toronto Act 1997 dispute.

== See also ==
- Government of Canada
- History of cities in Canada
- List of governments in Canada by annual expenditures
- List of municipalities in Canada
  - List of cities in Canada
  - List of towns in Canada
- Provinces and territories of Canada
