= Municipal elections in Canada =

Municipal elections in Canada fall within the jurisdiction of the various provinces and territories. Municipal elections usually elect a mayor and municipal council. In much of Canada, elections of directly elected school board trustees occur concurrently; some locations may also elect other bodies, such as Vancouver, which elects its own park board. Some municipalities will also hold referendums or ballot initiatives at the same time, usually relating to spending projects or tax changes.

As of 2024, all ten provinces and two of three territories have four-year terms of office for municipal officeholders and hold the associated elections on a fixed date. In most cases, all elections across a given province or territory are held simultaneously. Calendar dates vary from jurisdiction to jurisdiction; nine provinces (all except New Brunswick) hold their elections during a six-week span between late September and early November.

Each province has its own nomenclature for municipalities (including terms such as cities, villages, townships, municipal districts and counties), and some have local elections for unincorporated areas which are not technically municipalities. Elections for municipal councils are held either through ward systems or at-large systems, depending on the location. Vancouver is the largest city in Canada to use an at-large system, while most other large cities use wards.

Most councils are non-partisan and elect only independents. However, some municipalities have locally based political parties or election slates. These include Montreal, Quebec City and Longueuil in Quebec, Vancouver, Victoria, Surrey and Richmond in British Columbia and, since 2025, Edmonton and Calgary in Alberta. These local parties are rarely affiliated with any provincial or federal parties.

Voting may be done with paper ballots that are hand-counted, or by various forms of electronic voting.

== Municipal election chart by province and territory ==
Province or Territory		Occurrence	Date	Last election	Next election	Elections
Alberta	All municipalities excluding Lloydminster	4 years	3rd Monday in October	2025	2029	List
Alberta	Lloydminster	4 years	2nd Wednesday in November	2024	2028	List
British Columbia		4 years	3rd Saturday in October	2026	2030	List
Manitoba		4 years	4th Wednesday in October	2026	2030	List
New Brunswick		4 years	2nd Monday in May	2026	2030	List
Newfoundland and Labrador		4 years	Last Tuesday in September	2025	2029	List
Northwest Territories	Charter Community of Fort Good Hope	2 years	3rd Monday in July	2025	2027	List
Northwest Territories	Hamlets	2–3 years (staggered)	2nd Monday in December	2025	2026	List
Northwest Territories	Taxed communities other than Yellowknife	3 years	3rd Monday in October	2024	2027	List
Northwest Territories	Tłı̨chǫ communities	4 years	2nd Monday in June	2025	2029	List
Northwest Territories	Yellowknife	4 years	3rd Monday in October	2026	2030	List
Nova Scotia		4 years	3rd Saturday in October	2024	2028	List
Nunavut		4 years	4th Monday in October	2023	2027	List
Ontario		4 years	4th Monday in October	2026	2030	List
Prince Edward Island		4 years	1st Monday in November	2026	2030	List
Quebec		4 years	1st Sunday in November	2025	2029	List
Saskatchewan	Cities, towns, and villages	4 years	2nd Wednesday in November	2024	2028	List
Saskatchewan	Northern municipalities	4 years	Varies by municipality (Note: Provincial legislation allows the northern municipalities to each schedule their elections on a variety of date options in the Fall.)	2024	2028	List
Saskatchewan	Resort villages	4 years	Last Saturday in July	2024	2028	List
Saskatchewan	Rural municipalities (even-numbered districts)	4 years	2nd Wednesday in November	2022	2026	List
Saskatchewan	Rural municipalities (reeves and odd-numbered districts)	4 years	2nd Wednesday in November	2024	2028	List
Yukon		4 years	3rd Thursday in October	2024	2028	List

== Municipal term lengths ==
Municipal terms of office are established by provincial and territorial legislation and may therefore vary across Canada. Historically, municipal terms of office were often shorter than they are today, with one-, two- and three-year terms being common in many jurisdictions. By the late 1990s, most Canadians lived in a province where they elected their municipal leaders every three years.

From the late 1990s to the mid-2020s, Canadian provinces and territories gradually converged on four-year municipal terms. Nova Scotia adopted four-year municipal terms in 1998, followed by Manitoba, New Brunswick, Prince Edward Island and other provinces during the following decade. As late as 2010, Alberta and British Columbia still used three-year municipal terms, while Saskatchewan retained three-year terms for urban municipalities. Ontario moved to four-year terms in 2006, Alberta in 2010, and British Columbia in 2014. In 2023, Yukon enacted legislation extending municipal terms from three to four years, which took effect following the 2024 municipal elections. Following Yukon's reforms, the Northwest Territories remained the principal exception due to its mixed system of local-government election cycles.

== See also ==
- Canadian electoral calendar
- Elections in Canada
- Municipal government in Canada
- Provincial elections in Canada
