= List of mayors of Charlottetown =

This is a list of mayors of Charlottetown, Prince Edward Island:

No.	Years in office	Name	Place of birth	Notes	Ref
1	1855-1857	Robert Hutchinson	Charlottetown, Prince Edward Island	First mayor of Charlottetown	
2	1857-1867	Thomas Heath Haviland, Sr.	Cirencester, Gloucestershire, England	Died while in office	
3	1867-1872	Theophilus DesBrisay	Charlottetown, Prince Edward Island		
4	1872-1875	Neil Rankin			
5	1875-1877	Theophilus DesBrisay		Second non-subsequent election	
6	1877-1878	Jedediah Slason Carvell	Newcastle, New Brunswick	Refused renomination	
7	1878-1882	William Eddison Dawson	Leeds, England		
8	1882-1884	David Robert Moore Hooper	Charlottetown, Prince Edward Island		
9	1885-1886	Henry Beer	Charlottetown, Prince Edward Island	Died while in office	
10	1886-1893	Thomas Heath Haviland, Jr.	Charlottetown, Prince Edward Island		
11	1893-1897	William Eddison Dawson	Leeds, England	Second non-subsequent election	
12	1897-1904	James Warburton	Woodbrook, Prince Edward Island		
13	1904-1906	Frederick F. Kelly	Charlottetown, Prince Edward Island	Town's first Roman Catholic mayor	
14	1906-1908	James Paton	Paisley, Scotland		
15	1908-1910	Benjamin C. Prowse	Charlottetown, Prince Edward Island		
16	1910-1912	Benjamin Rogers	Charlottetown, Prince Edward Island		
17	1912-1914	Charles Lyons			
18	1914-1916	R.H. Stearns			
19	1916-1918	P.S. Brown			
20	1918-1920	George Dudley Wright	Bedeque, Prince Edward Island		
21	1920-1922	Daniel J. Riley			
22	1922-1924	Robert Harold Jenkins	Mount Albion, Prince Edward Island		
23	1924-1926	John McKenna			
24	1926-1928	Leonard B. Miller			
25	1928-1930	Ira J. Yeo			
26	1930-1932	Thomas William Lemuel Prowse	Charlottetown, Prince Edward Island		
27	1932-1934	William S. Stewart	Marshfield, Prince Edward Island		
28	1934-1936	Samuel Kennedy			
29	1936-1938	Percy W. Turner			
30	1938-1940	Ernest A. Foster	Charlottetown, Prince Edward Island		
31	1940-1944	B. Roy Holman			
32	1944-1946	James E. Blanchard			
33	1946-1951	B. Earle MacDonald	Covehead, Prince Edward Island		
34	1951-1956	J. David Stewart	Georgetown, Prince Edward Island		
35	1956-1958	Edwin C. Johnstone	Long River, Prince Edward Island		
36	1960-1965	A. Walthen Gaudet			
37	1965-1969	Walter J. Cox			
38	1969-1972	Dorothy Corrigan	Charlottetown, Price Edward Island	Defeated incumbent mayor Cox to become Charlottetown's first woman mayor	
39	1972-1975	Elmer J. MacRae			
40	1975-1978	Frank Zakem	Saint-Paul-du-Buton, Quebec		
41	1978-1987	Frank J. Moran	Newfoundland and Labrador		
42	1987-1993	John E. Ready	Charlottetown, Prince Edward Island		
43	1993-1998	Ian McDonald	Charlottetown, Prince Edward Island		
44	1998-2003	George MacDonald			
45	2003-2018	Clifford J. Lee	Charlottetown, Prince Edward Island	Longest-serving mayor	
46	2018–2026	Philip Brown			
47	2026-present	Amir Zuccolo			
