= Municipal elections in Prince Edward Island =

Elections in the Canadian province

This page has a list of all municipal elections in Prince Edward Island.

- 2014 Prince Edward Island municipal elections
- 2018 Prince Edward Island municipal elections
- 2022 Prince Edward Island municipal elections
- 2026 Prince Edward Island municipal elections

== See also ==
- Municipal elections in Canada
