= Clifford J. Lee =

Canadian politician

His Worship Clifford J. Lee

45th Mayor of Charlottetown
- In office November 2003 – December 6, 2018
- Preceded by: George MacDonald
- Succeeded by: Philip Brown

Personal details
- Born: December 10 Charlottetown, Prince Edward Island
- Spouse(s): Anne Marie Children = James Parents = Harold and Susan Lee
- Profession: Civil servant

Clifford J. Lee was the 45th Mayor of the city of Charlottetown, Prince Edward Island, Canada, first elected in 2003. He was re-elected three times and held the office until 2018, but announced in April of that year that he would not contest that year's municipal election. His final term ended on December 6, 2018.

== See also ==
- List of mayors of Charlottetown
- Charlottetown City Council
