= 2026 in North America =

The following lists events that will happen during 2026 in North America.

== Incumbents ==
=== Northern America ===
==== Bermuda ====
(Bermuda)

- Monarch: Charles III (2022–present)
- Governor: Rena Lalgie (2020–present)
- Premier: Edward David Burt (2017–present)

==== Canada ====
(Canada)

- Monarch – Charles III (2022–present)
- Governor General
  - Mary Simon (2021–2026)
  - Louise Arbour (2026–present)
- Prime Minister – Mark Carney (2025–present)

==== Greenland ====
(Greenland)

- Monarch – Frederik X (2024–present)
- High Commissioner – Julie Præst Wilche (2022–present)
- Premier – Jens-Frederik Nielsen (2025–present)

==== Saint Pierre and Miquelon ====
(Saint Pierre and Miquelon)

==== United States ====
(United States)

- President: Donald J. Trump (2025–present)
- Vice President: JD Vance (2025–present)

==== Mexico ====
(Mexico)

- President: Claudia Sheinbaum (2024–present)

== Events ==
=== June ===
- June 11 – The National Assembly in Quebec passes (103-1), the Coalition Avenir Québec (CAQ) government Bill that bans the sale of energy drinks to people under 16. Quebec becomes the first Canadian province/jurisdiction in North America to do this.

=== Elections ===
- 2026 Quebec general election
- 2026 British Columbia municipal elections
- 2026 Ontario municipal elections
- 2026 Prince Edward Island municipal elections
- 2026 Manitoba municipal elections
- 2026 United States elections

== See also ==
- List of state leaders in North America in 2026
