= Municipal Government Act (Alberta) =

Local government legislation in Alberta

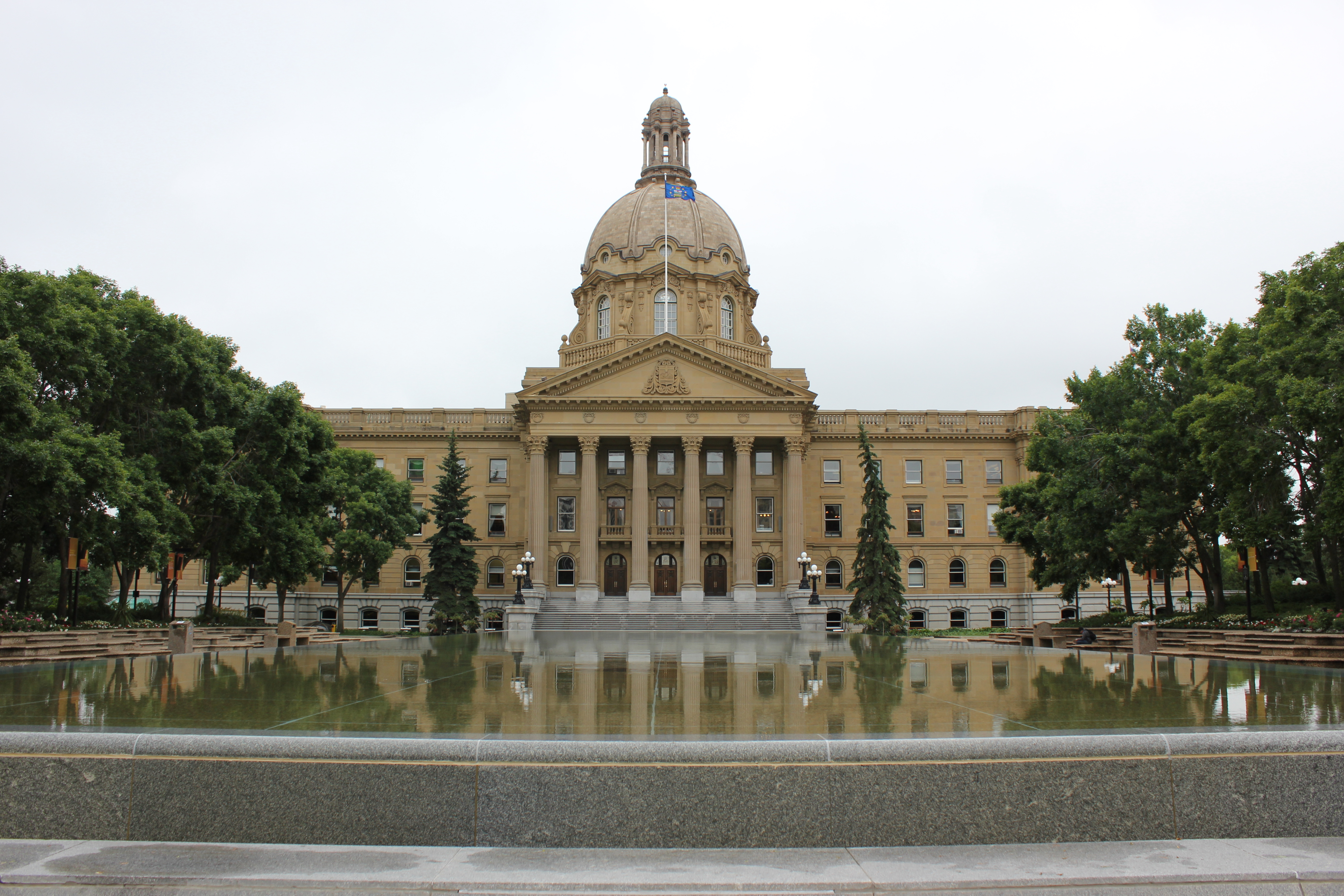

Legislative Assembly of Alberta
- Citation: RSA 2000, c M-26
- Territorial extent: Alberta
- Enacted by: Legislative Assembly of Alberta
- Enacted: June 1, 1968

Legislative history
- Bill title: An Act respecting Municipal Government
- Bill citation: Bill 23
- Introduced by: Edgar Gerhart
- Introduced: February 15, 1968

Repeals
- The City Act; The Town and Village Act; The Municipal District Act; The Early Closing Act; The Houses of Public Accommodations Act
- Status: In force

The Municipal Government Act defines local government within the Province of Alberta. The Municipal Government Act was substantially updated and modernized in 1994 to give municipalities greater control over local decision-making and govern the affairs of the municipalities, including the former Planning Act and the Regional Municipal Services Act.

== History ==
The original Municipal Government Act (known as Bill 23) was introduced by Edgar Gerhart in the Alberta Legislature in 1968 during the 1st Session of the 16th Alberta Legislature, along with the Municipal Election Act (now known as the Local Authorities Election Act). It came into effect on June 1, 1968, and defines the laws and rules under which municipalities may operate. The MGA has been subject to numerous changes over the years.

In March 2022, Bill 4 of the 3rd Session of the 30th Alberta Legislature, known as the Municipal Government (Face Mask and Proof of COVID-19 Vaccination Bylaws) Amendment Act, 2022 was introduced which amends the Municipal Government Act in order to restrict the introduction and enactment of municipal bylaws regarding face masks and proof of vaccination against COVID-19 unless approved by the Minister of Municipal Affairs, and required the immediate repeal of such municipal bylaws already in place upon coming into force. It passed first, second, and third readings throughout the month and received Royal Assent on April 21, 2022, and became law on the same day.

The Municipal Government Act was amended in October 2024 to give the provincial government greater powers to override local legislation and to recall local elected representatives, and permitting slates of candidates in Calgary and Edmonton and increasing contribution limits from corporate and union donors beginning with the 2025 Alberta municipal elections.
