= Robert Hutchinson =

Robert or Bob Hutchinson may refer to:

- Robert Hutchinson (author) (born 1957), American author and essayist
- Robert Hutchinson (Australian politician) (1857–1918), from Western Australia
- Robert Hutchinson (Canadian politician) (1802–1866), from Prince Edward Island
- Robert Hutchinson (historian), author of The Last Days of Henry VIII
- Bob Hutchinson (footballer) (1894–1971), English footballer
- Bob Hutchinson (athlete) (1931–2025), Canadian Olympic sprinter
- Robert Hutchinson (missing person), a man from Hendon, Sunderland, England, who disappeared on 23 June 2014

== See also ==
- Robert Hutchison (disambiguation)
- Bobby Hutcherson (1941–2016), jazz musician
