= Municipal elections in New Brunswick =

Elections in the Canadian province

This page has a list of all municipal elections in New Brunswick.

- 2004 New Brunswick municipal elections
- 2008 New Brunswick municipal elections
- 2012 New Brunswick municipal elections
- 2016 New Brunswick municipal elections
- 2021 New Brunswick municipal elections
- 2022 New Brunswick municipal elections
- 2023 New Brunswick municipal by-elections
- 2024 New Brunswick municipal by-elections
- 2025 New Brunswick municipal by-elections
- 2026 New Brunswick municipal elections

== See also ==
- Municipal elections in Canada
