= Dorothy Corrigan =

Canadian politician

Dorothy Corrigan OC

38th Mayor of Charlottetown
- In office 1968–1972
- Preceded by: Walter J. Cox
- Succeeded by: Elmer J. MacRae

Mary Catherine Dorothy Corrigan OC (née Hennessey; July 26, 1913 – March 20, 2010) was a Canadian politician. She was the 38th Mayor of her hometown of Charlottetown, Prince Edward Island, and the first woman to hold that office. It was not until 2026 that another woman, Amir Zuccolo, would be elected to the role.

Corrigan originally pursued a career as a nurse, but entered politics following the death of her husband, Dr. J. Ernest Corrigan. Her first public office was as an alderman in Charlottetown's Ward 2 prior to running for mayor of the city in 1968.

She was elected as the city's first female mayor in the fall of 1968. Corrigan served as mayor until 1972. She worked at the landmark Hotel Charlottetown after leaving city hall.

Dorothy Corrigan lived independently at her home until 2009. She died at the Garden Nursing Home in Charlottetown on March 20, 2010, at the age of 96. Her funeral was held at The Church of the Most Holy Redeemer in Charlottetown.
