= 2022 Prince Edward Island municipal elections =

2022 Municipal elections Canadian province

- November 7, 2022

Municipal elections were held in the Canadian province of Prince Edward Island on November 7, 2022.

== Charlottetown ==
Results of the mayoral election by ward and polling division

=== Mayor ===
The results for mayor of Charlottetown were as follows:

Mayoral Candidate	Vote	%
Philip Brown (X)	5,262	46.75
Cecil Francis Villard	3,637	32.31
Daniel Mullen	2,356	20.93

=== City Council ===
Results for Charlottetown City Council were as follows:

Candidate	Vote	%
Ward 1 - Queens Square
Alanna Jankov (X)	547	50.41
Joanna Morrison	462	42.58
Wade Munn	76	7.00
Ward 2 - Belvedere
Justin Muttart	476	44.44
Terry MacLeod (X)	318	29.69
Wendi James Poirier	250	23.34
Eric McMurray	27	2.52
Ward 3 - Brighton
Norman Beck	896	62.01
Barb MacLeod	549	37.99
Ward 4 - Spring Park
Mitchell G. Tweel (X)	706	53.44
Barbara Dylla	615	46.56
Ward 5 - Ellen's Creek
Kevin Ramsay (X)	317	34.91
Tony Carroll	222	24.45
Pauline MacIntyre	214	23.57
Daniel Cousins	155	17.07
Ward 6 - Mount Edward
Bob Doiron (X)	837	68.89
Ryan Ramsay	378	31.11
Ward 7 - Beach Grove
John McAleer	640	54.70
Paul Gaudet	333	28.46
Linda Clark	197	16.84
Ward 8 - Highfield
Trevor MacKinnon	562	45.36
Corey Driscoll	536	43.26
Charlene Wight	141	11.38
Ward 9 - Stonepark
Julie McCabe (X)	781	78.89
Gordon Gay	209	21.11
Ward 10 - Falconwood
Terry Bernard (X)	Acclaimed	

== Cornwall ==
=== Mayor ===
Cornwall mayor Minerva McCourt was re-elected as mayor of Cornwall by acclamation:

Mayoral Candidate	Vote	%
Minerva McCourt (X)	Acclaimed	

== Stratford ==
The results for mayor of Stratford are as follows:

=== Mayor ===
Mayoral Candidate	Vote	%
Steve Ogden (X)	2,290	73.40
Gail MacDonald	830	26.60

== Summerside ==
The results for mayor of Summerside are as follows:

=== Mayor ===
Mayoral Candidate	Vote	%
Dan Kutcher	3,390	61.55
Basil Stewart (X)	1,999	36.29
James Ford	119	2.16

== Three Rivers ==
The results for mayor of Three Rivers were as follows:

=== Mayor ===
Mayoral Candidate	Vote	%
Debbie Johnston	1,099	56.30
Ray Brow	853	43.70
