= Robert Hutchison =

Robert Hutchison may refer to:

- Robert Hutchison of Carlowrie (1834–1894), Scottish landowner and photographer
- Robert Hutchison, 1st Baron Hutchison of Montrose (1873–1950), Scottish soldier, politician and peer
- Sir Robert Hutchison, 1st Baronet (1871–1960), Scottish physician and writer
- Robert Gemmell Hutchison (1855–1936), Scottish landscape artist
- Robert Hutchison (mayor) (1828–1863), businessman and politician in Cape Coast
- Robert Hutchison (meteoriticist) (died 2007)

== See also ==
- Robert Hutchinson (disambiguation)
- Bobby Hutcherson (1941–2016), jazz musician
