= 2014 Prince Edward Island municipal elections =

- November 3, 2014

Municipal elections were held in the Canadian province of Prince Edward Island on November 3, 2014.

== Charlottetown ==
Mayoral Candidate	Vote	%
Clifford Lee (X)	7,696	57.49
Philip Brown	4,828	36.07
Keith Kennedy	862	6.44

== Cornwall ==
Mayoral Candidate	Vote	%
Minerva McCourt	674	40.12
Corey Frizzell	649	38.18
Marlene Hunt	369	21.71

== Stratford ==
Mayoral Candidate	Vote	%
David Dunphy (X)	Acclaimed	

== Summerside ==
Mayoral Candidate	Vote	%
Bill Martin	4,614	68.80
Basil Stewart (X)	2,092	31.20
