= Charlottetown City Hall =

City hall in Charlottetown, Prince Edward Island, Canada

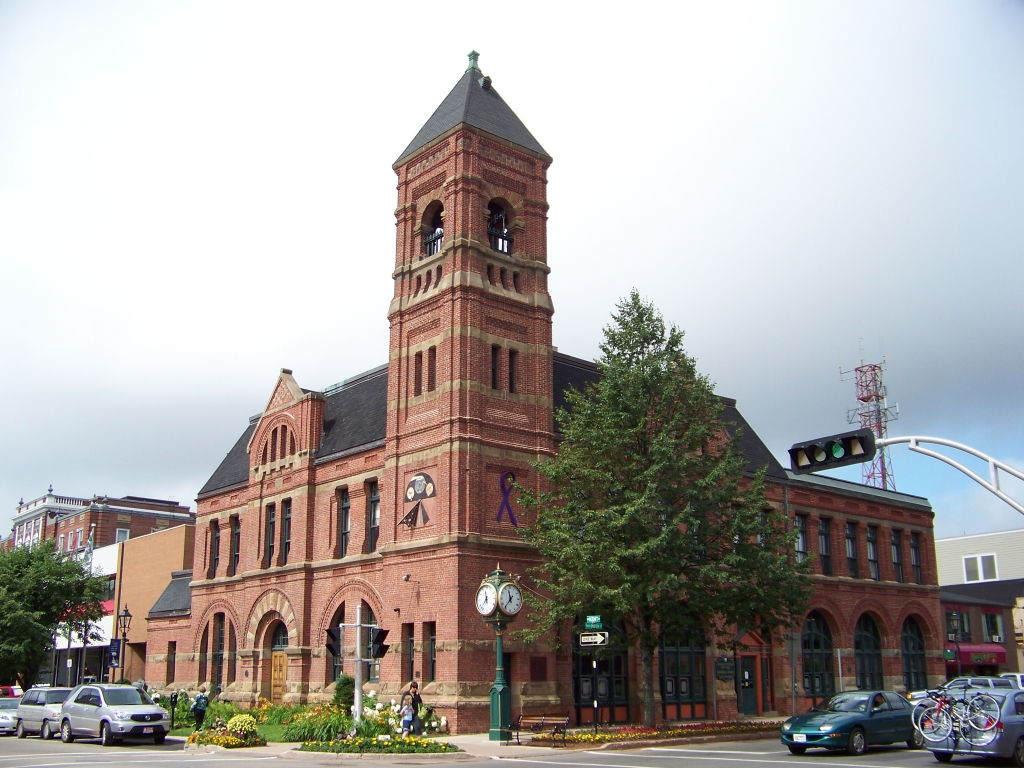
- Interactive map of the Charlottetown City Hall area

General information
- Architectural style: Romanesque Revival
- Location: 199 Queen Street; Charlottetown, Prince Edward Island; C1A 7K2
- Coordinates: 46°14′6.97″N 63°7′46.59″W
- Groundbreaking: 1887
- Opened: 1888
- Renovated: 1916

Technical details
- Floor count: 3

Design and construction
- Architects: John Lemuel Phillips, Charles Benjamin Chappell
- Main contractor: William H. Fraser

Renovating team
- Architects: Charles Benjamin Chappell, John Marshall Hunter

National Historic Site of Canada
- Designated: 1984

Charlottetown City Hall is the seat of City Council in Charlottetown, Prince Edward Island, Canada. It is located at 199 Queen Street at the corner of Kent Street.

It was designed by architects John Lemuel Phillips and Charles Benjamin Chappell in the Romanesque Revival style. It was built by contractor William H. Fraser beginning in 1887 and was completed in 1888. The fire hall designed by Charles Benjamin Chappell and John Marshall Hunter opened in 1916.

It was designated as a National Historic Site of Canada on November 23, 1984.
