= Frank Zakem =

Canadian politician (1931–2013)

Francis "Frank" Joseph Zakem OPEI (August 30, 1931 – January 23, 2013) was a Canadian businessman, politician, educator and author.

Zakem was born in Saint-Paul-du-Buton, Quebec (now Saint-Paul-de-Montminy) in 1931 and moved to Prince Edward Island in 1936 with his family. He received his early education at Queens Square School, Prince of Wales College and Saint Dunstan's University, earning the degrees of Bachelor of Commerce, Bachelor of Arts and Bachelor of Education. He spent two years at the Grand Seminary of Montreal Theology and completed the Management Development Program for College Administrators at Trent University.

In his early career, Zakem participated actively in his family business. He later wrote about the experience in several books including The Corner Store Experience for which he received a heritage award from the City of Charlottetown, The Zakem Marji Story and The Basilica Recreation Center Before and After.

Zakem worked as an educator in a number of Prince Edward Island institutions, including Saint Dunstan's University, Prince of Wales College, the University of Prince Edward Island and Holland College, where he served in a variety of capacities, including President at Holland College for 26 years.

Zakem served as city councillor for Charlottetown City Council from 1964 to 1974 and 1995 to 1998 and served as mayor from 1975 to 1977. During his tenure as mayor he oversaw the creation of the Charlottetown Area Development Corporation and helped establish a series of guidelines for the preservation of heritage in Charlottetown. One product of these guidelines was the restoration of Victoria Row, a block of Richmond Street between Queen Street and Great George Street, as well as its development into a seasonal pedestrian mall. For six years Zakem was seconded to work in various capacities in the office of Premier Joe Ghiz.

In the 1990s, Zakem consulted on the issue of municipal reform and, later that decade, he served as Director of the Federation of Prince Edward Island Municipalities. He also had a long-term involvement in community organizations dealing with mental and physical health, sports, multicultural matters and race relations, the Boy Scouts, and in helping create the Rotary Youth Parliament, a training ground for many current and future Island leaders. His writings on the political machinations of Prince Edward Island, including his work on municipal representation, are still used as reference material by political researchers.

Zakem died in Charlottetown on January 23, 2013.

== Awards ==
In 2009, Zakem was admitted into the Order of Prince Edward Island in recognition of his many contributions to public life in the fields of politics, heritage, writing, education, business and community activity.

Zakem was recognized and honoured as one of the Founders of the University of Prince Edward Island in 2011.

Zakem was presented with an honorary Doctorate from the University of Prince Edward Island in 2012.
