= Basil Stewart =

Canadian politician

Basil L. Stewart is a Canadian politician served as the mayor of Summerside, Prince Edward Island from 2018 to 2022. He previously served as mayor from 1985 to 2014 and as the president of the Canadian Federation of Municipalities in 2009–2010. Stewart was defeated in the 2014 Summerside mayoral election by Bill Martin. He returned to office, winning the 2018 Summerside mayoral election, but lost his bid for re-election in 2022.

== Before mayorship ==
Before his election as mayor, Stewart was a police officer for the Summerside Police Department from 1971 to 1984, when he retired from the force.

== Mayorship ==
After his retirement from the police force, Stewart entered municipal politics, being elected mayor of the Town of Summerside in 1985. He was re-elected in 1988 and 1991. In 1994, he became the first mayor of the now City of Summerside (Summerside formerly being a town). He was re-elected in the municipal elections held in 1997, 2000, 2003, 2006 and 2010.

In 1993, Stewart ran in a federal election as the Progressive Conservative candidate for the riding of Egmont. He was defeated by then-incumbent Liberal MP Joe McGuire, who won with a plurality of approximately 3,700 votes.

In 2011, Stewart admitted the city paid $1.3 million for a Michael Jackson tribute concert featuring stars such as Beyoncé, Justin Timberlake, Rihanna and Usher, which ultimately never occurred. The city had started attempting to get the money returned in April 2010, though Stewart had insisted the concert was going ahead as late as October. The city filed a lawsuit against Katrina Berg Sussmeier and promotion company StarLink Productions in an effort to recoup the funds. In 2013, the city accepted a stipulated judgment in which neither party claimed guilt and no money was repaid.

At the 2014 Summerside mayoral election, Bill Martin, a Summerside businessman, was elected mayor with a vote count of 4,614 compared to Stewart's 2,092, thus ending Stewart's 29-year run as mayor of Summerside.

== Other associations ==
In 2009, Stewart was President of the Federation of Canadian Municipalities. In the past, he also served as Chair of Atlantic Caucus in 1998 and Chair of National Economic Development Committee from 1998–2000.

In 2015, he was named to the National Capital Commission. In 2017, Stewart was named to the Order of Canada.

== Electoral record ==
1993 Canadian federal election: Egmont
Party	Candidate	Votes	%	±%
Liberal	Joe McGuire	10,547	57.71	+4.62
Progressive Conservative	Basil Stewart	6,850	37.48	-1.92
New Democratic	Basil Brian Dumville	880	4.81	-2.71
Total valid votes		18,277	100.00	
