= Ian MacDonald (Canadian politician) =

Ian MacDonald, colloquially known as "Tex", is a former public school teacher, who was the 43rd Mayor of Charlottetown, Prince Edward Island, Canada.

MacDonald served as a councilor on Charlottetown City Council during the late 1980s and early 1990s, culminating in the mayorship from 1992 to 1997.

MacDonald was a prominent member of the Progressive Conservative Party of Prince Edward Island prior to publicly switching to the Prince Edward Island Liberal Party to run for that party's leadership which became vacant with the resignation of Premier Catherine Callbeck in 1996. MacDonald ran unsuccessfully for the Liberal leadership against Daniel Mullen, Keith Milligan, and Wayne Cheverie.

MacDonald returned to teaching at Colonel Gray High School before retiring in the early 2000s. Following the electoral victory of Robert Ghiz in the 2007 general election, MacDonald was appointed Executive Assistant to the Premier.
