= Municipal elections in Nova Scotia =

Elections in the Canadian province

This page has a list of all municipal elections in Nova Scotia.

- 2008 Nova Scotia municipal elections
- 2012 Nova Scotia municipal elections
- 2016 Nova Scotia municipal elections
- 2020 Nova Scotia municipal elections
- 2024 Nova Scotia municipal elections

== See also ==
- Municipal elections in Canada
