= Municipal elections in Alberta =

Elections in the Canadian province

This page has a list of all municipal elections in Alberta.

- 2007 Alberta municipal elections
- 2010 Alberta municipal elections
- 2013 Alberta municipal elections
- 2017 Alberta municipal elections
- 2021 Alberta municipal elections
- 2025 Alberta municipal elections

== See also ==
- Municipal elections in Canada
