= 2023 New Brunswick municipal by-elections =

2023 New Brunswick local electoral events
- 13 February 2023; 23 October 2023
- Registered: 33,626
- Turnout: 20.30%

In 2023, local government by-elections were held across New Brunswick fill mayoral and town council vacancies.

The by-elections for wards 2 and 3 of Valley Waters were held on 13 February, while the remainder of the by-elections were held on 23 October.

== Valley Waters ==
By-elections were held in Valley Waters to elect one councillor for Ward 2 and one councillor for Ward 3. This was done because of a change in the allocation of council seats.

Previously, Ward 2 was allocated one councillor, but was now allocated two, creating a vacant seat. Ward 3 used to have two council seats, but this was reduced to one. However, since no candidates put their names forward in Ward 3 in 2022, it still had one vacant seat.

=== Councillor Ward 2 ===
Candidate	Votes	%
Carey Beth Gillis	66	57.89%
Dean Ricketson	48	42.11%

=== Councillor Ward 3 ===
Candidate	Votes	%
Lindsey Ganong	37	53.62%
Tracey Hanlin	32	46.38%

== Beaurivage ==
By-elections were held in Beaurivage to elect one councillor at large and one councillor for Ward 4, following the resignations of Dennis Mazerolle and Joanne Robichaud, respectively.

There was also a by-election in Ward 2 as no candidates stood for election to that seat in 2022.

=== Councillor at Large ===
Candidate	Votes	%
Danielle Andrée Dugas	947	66.97%
Stéphane Godin	354	25.04%
Brian Stevens	113	7.99%

=== Councillor Ward 2 ===
Candidate	Votes	%
Argentine Robichaud	Acclaimed	

=== Councillor Ward 6 ===
Candidate	Votes	%
Roger Doiron	137	36.93%
Dianne Comeau	136	36.66%
Lucie Vautour	98	26.42%

== Campobello Island ==
A by-election was held to elect a new councillor for Ward 2 of Campobello Island following the resignation of Elizabeth Greenier-Butler. However, no candidates stood for election and the seat remained vacant.

=== Councillor Ward 2 ===
Candidate	Votes	%
No candidate

== Fredericton Junction ==
A by-election was held in Fredericton Junction to elect a new mayor following the resignation of John B. Bigger.

=== Mayor ===
Candidate	Votes	%
R. Len Falconer	119	61.34%
Kyle Mitchell	75	38.66%

== Grand Lake ==
A by-election was held to elect a new councillor for Ward 4 of Grand Lake following the resignation of Shaun Ward.

=== Councillor Ward 4 ===
Candidate	Votes	%
Shawn Patterson	459	75.12%
Murray John Doherty	152	24.88%

== Grand Manan ==
A by-election was held in Grand Manan to elect two new councillors at large following the resignations of Joanne Brown and Gregg O. Russell.

=== Councillor at Large (Note: Each voter was permitted to vote for up to two candidates.) ===
Candidate	Votes	%
Susan Ballantyne	Acclaimed	
Wayne H. Sturgeon	Acclaimed	

== Hanwell ==
By-elections were held in Hanwell to elect two one councillor at large, one councillor for Ward 4, and one councillor for Ward 5, following the resignations of Pat Septon, Morgan MacPherson, and Debby Peck, respectively.

=== Councillor at Large ===
Candidate	Votes	%
Candice Lee Dekleva	333	49.33%
John R. Casey	258	38.22%
Paul MacIntosh	42	6.22%
Diane Reid	42	6.22%

=== Councillor Ward 4 ===
Candidate	Votes	%
David Holt	54	54.55%
Shane Walsh	32	32.32%
Sue-anne McDonald	13	13.13%

=== Councillor Ward 5 ===
Candidate	Votes	%
Chris Bringloe	Acclaimed	

== Neguac ==
A by-election was held to elect a new councillor at large in Neguac following the resignation of Jean Savoie.

=== Councillor at Large ===
Candidate	Votes	%
Michael Comeau	377	74.95%
Emile Basque	126	25.05%

== Riverview ==
A by-election was held to elect a new councillor at large in Riverview following the resignation of Russell Hayward.

=== Councillor at Large ===
Candidate	Votes	%
Stephen Gouzoules	777	39.10%
Lynda Carey	640	32.21%
Rudy Walters	381	19.17%
Ian Stuart Gunn	189	9.51%

== Southern Victoria ==
A by-election was held to elect a new councillor for Ward 2 of Southern Victoria following the resignation of Bill Stevenson.

=== Councillor Ward 2 ===
Candidate	Votes	%
Paul Legace	211	60.46%
Justin Gray	110	31.52%
Sarah Etta (Sally) Nicholson	28	8.02%

== Sunbury-York South ==
A by-election was held to elect a councillor for Ward 1 of Sunbury-York South as only one candidate stood for election in Ward 1 2022 despite two positions being available.

=== Councillor Ward 1 ===
Candidate	Votes	%
Larry DeLong	124	74.25%
Cory Allen	43	25.75%

== Tracy ==
=== Councillor at Large (Note: Each voter was permitted to vote for up to two candidates.) ===
Candidate	Votes	%
Gary (Gi) Jones	110	40.29%
Shelly M. Nowlan	86	31.50%
Danette Fillier-Aubin	77	28.21%

== Upper Miramichi ==
By-elections were held in Upper Miramichi to elect one councillor for Ward 1 and one councillor for Ward 3, following the death of Keith Clowater and resignation Ronald Fowler, respectively.

=== Councillor Ward 1 ===
Candidate	Votes	%
Wendy Wellwood	Acclaimed	

=== Councillor Ward 3 ===
Candidate	Votes	%
Darrell (Frank) McKeil	Acclaimed	
