= Municipal elections in British Columbia =

Elections in the Canadian province

This page lists all articles covering municipal elections in British Columbia.

- 2005 British Columbia municipal elections
- 2008 British Columbia municipal elections
- 2011 British Columbia municipal elections
- 2014 British Columbia municipal elections
- 2018 British Columbia municipal elections
- 2022 British Columbia municipal elections
- 2026 British Columbia municipal elections

== See also ==
- Municipal elections in Canada
