= 2018 Prince Edward Island municipal elections =

2018 Municipal elections Canadian province

- November 5, 2018

Municipal elections were held in the Canadian province of Prince Edward Island on November 5, 2018.

== Charlottetown ==
Results of the Charlottetown mayoral election by ward

=== Mayor ===
Mayoral Candidate	Vote	%
Philip Brown	6,136	42.13
Kim Devine	5,207	35.75
Cecil Villard	1,860	12.77
Jamie Larkin	1,160	7.97
William Izzard McFadden	200	1.37

=== City Council ===
Candidates for Charlottetown City Council are as follows:

Candidate	Vote	%
Ward 1 - Queens Square
Alanna Jankov	516	35.20
Paul Haddad	435	29.67
Ron Dowling	291	19.85
Laurent Beaulieu	149	10.16
Leo Killorn	75	5.12
Ward 2 - Belvedere
Terry MacLeod (X)	686	52.93
Justin Muttart	610	47.07
Ward 3 - Brighton
Mike Duffy (X)	648	37.57
Norman Beck	595	34.49
Frank MacEachern	421	24.41
Keith Kennedy	61	3.54
Ward 4 - Spring Park
Mitchell G. Tweel (X)	924	56.31
Valentine Gomez	623	37.96
Richard Turner	94	5.73
Ward 5 - Ellen's Creek
Kevin Ramsay (X)	603	48.91
Kenneth DesRoches	333	27.01
Pauline MacIntyre	297	24.09
Ward 6 - Mount Edward
Bob Doiron (X)	588	36.48
Melissa Hilton	560	34.74
David W. MacDonald	464	28.78
Ward 7 - Beach Grove
Greg Rivard (X)	Acclaimed	
Ward 8 - Highfield
Jason Coady (X)	1,000	65.92
Trevor MacKinnon	517	34.08
Ward 9 - Stonepark
Julie McCabe	1,092	75.78
Lornie Hughes	349	24.22
Ward 10 - Falconwood
Terry Bernard (X)	883	64.83
Jason MacKinnon	418	30.69
Ryan Cooke	61	4.48

== Cornwall ==
Mayoral Candidate	Vote	%
Minerva McCourt (X)	1,357	74.77
Graham Hicken	458	25.23

== Stratford ==
Mayoral Candidate	Vote	%
Steve Ogden	1,650	48.64
Jody Jackson	1,217	35.88
Sandy McMillan	525	15.48

== Summerside ==
Mayoral Candidate	Vote	%
Basil Stewart	2,392	38.33
Nancy Beth Guptil	2,115	33.89
Brent Gallant	1,733	27.77
