= Municipal elections in Ontario =

Elections in the Canadian province

Municipal elections in Ontario, a province of Canada, are held every four years. Municipalities in Ontario held an election on October 24, 2022. Prior to 2006, elections were held every three years.

== Evolution of municipal franchise ==
Upon the formation of the Province, the rules for elections were as follows:

1. Election day was the first Monday in January of each year
2. Electors had to be male, at least 21 years old, and a freeholder, householder or tenant in the municipality
3. They (or their wives) had to have been resident in the municipality for at least one month before the election
4. They had to hold real property (whether in their own right or that of their wives) of a minimum value: $100 in townships, $200 in villages, $300 in towns and $400 in cities
5. Persons aged 60 and over were exempted from standing for election
6. Municipalities had the option to require property taxes to be fully paid in order to vote

Changes in Ontario municipal election laws
Year	Amending Act	Change
1882	Municipal Amendment Act, 1882, S.O. 1882, c. 23, s. 15	Unmarried women and widows, having the necessary property qualification, given the right to vote on money by-laws
1903	The Municipal Act, 1903, S.O. 1903, c. 18, s. 19	Cities with a population over 100,000 given the option to set Election Day as January 1
1906	The Municipal Amendment Act, 1906, S.O. 1906, c. 34, s. 4	Municipalities given the option (with the assent of the electors) to hold elections every other year
1914	The Municipal Amendment Act, 1914, S.O. 1914, c. 33, s. 4	All municipalities enabled to set January 1 as Election Day
1917	The Women's Municipal Franchise Act, S.O. 1917, c. 36	Right to vote granted to all women, subject to property qualification; Where the wife holds real property and the husband does not, she may renounce her right to vote in favour of him
1922	The Municipal Amendment Act, 1922, S.O. 1922, c. 71, s. 3	Municipalities given the option to set Election Day as the first Monday of December
1937	The Municipal Amendment Act, 1937, S.O. 1937 (1st sess.), c. 47, s. 5	Municipalities given the option to set Election Day as December 14
1941	The Municipal Amendment Act, 1941, S.O. 1941, c. 35, s. 2, 4	Maximum age for candidates is repealed; Extension of franchise to members of the military absent from the municipality
1946	The Municipal Amendment Act, 1946, S.O. 1946, c. 60, s. 15	Municipalities also given the option (with the assent of the electors) to have staggered elections, electing half the council annually
1955	The Municipal Amendment Act, 1955, S.O. 1955, c. 48, s. 10	Assent of the electors no longer required to institute biennial or staggered elections
1958	The Municipal Franchise Extension Act, 1958, S.O. 1958, c. 66	Councils allowed to provide for the removal of the property qualification as a condition for entry on the voters' list
1971	The Age of Majority and Accountability Act, 1971, S.O. 1971 (1st sess.), c. 98	Reduction in voting age from 21 to 18
1972	The Municipal Elections Act, 1972, S.O. 1972, c. 95	Standardization of election rules: Term of office set as two years for all officials (s. 9); Effective with 1972 elections, all elections to be held every other year (s. 10); Election Day fixed on the first Monday of December (s. 11); Extension of franchise to all Canadian citizens and British subjects resident or holding property in the municipality (ss. 12-13); Property qualification required for being able to vote on money by-laws (s. 15)
1977	The Municipal Elections Act, 1977, S.O. 1977 (1st sess.), c. 62, s. 11	Election Day advanced to second Monday of November
1982	Municipal Elections Amendment Act, 1982 (no. 1), S.O. 1982, c. 2	Effective with 1982 elections, terms of all officials extended to three years
1982	Municipal Elections Amendment Act, 1982 (no. 2), S.O. 1982, c. 37, s. 4	Removal of mandatory property qualification for voting on money by-laws
1985	Municipal Elections Amendment Act, 1985, S.O. 1982, c. 4	Restrictions of franchise: Other British subjects removed from voters' lists; Disqualification of inmates of penal and correctional institutions
2006	Budget Measures Act, 2006, S.O. 2006, c. 9, Sch. H	Effective with 2006 elections, terms of all officials extended to four years
2009	Good Government Act, 2009, S.O. 2009, c. 33, Sch. 21, s. 8(4)	Election Day advanced to fourth Monday of October

== Direct elections to county councils ==
In 1896, the election of county councillors was separated from the election of local councillors. Counties were organized into divisions for electoral purposes, each of which would elect two councillors, and the number of councillors was determined by the population.

Formation of county councils (1896)
County population	Number of councillors	Number of divisions
Less than 25,000	8–10	4–5
25,000–40,000	10–12	5–6
40,000–60,000	12–14	6–7
Greater than 60,000	16–18	8–9

There was no requirement for the county divisions to be contiguous in area, and such a fragmented division (consisting of three municipalities) was noted in Halton County. It was observed that "the arrangement by which one of the municipalities in No. 4 county council division must be left out in the cold is anything but a satisfactory one".

In 1904, provision was made for a majority of the councils in a county to be able to oust direct elections, in favour of a county council consisting of the mayors and reeves of the constituent municipalities. Direct elections were finally abolished in 1907.

== Elections ==
- 1972 Ontario municipal elections
- 1976 Ontario municipal elections
- 1978 Ontario municipal elections
- 1980 Ontario municipal elections
- 1982 Ontario municipal elections
- 1985 Ontario municipal elections
- 1988 Ontario municipal elections
- 1991 Ontario municipal elections
- 1994 Ontario municipal elections
- 1997 Ontario municipal elections
- 2000 Ontario municipal elections
- 2003 Ontario municipal elections
- 2006 Ontario municipal elections
- 2010 Ontario municipal elections
- 2014 Ontario municipal elections
- 2018 Ontario municipal elections
- 2022 Ontario municipal elections
- 2026 Ontario municipal elections

== See also ==
- Municipal elections in Canada
