= Municipal elections in Newfoundland and Labrador =

Elections in the Canadian province

This page has a list of all municipal elections in Newfoundland and Labrador.

- 2005 Newfoundland and Labrador municipal elections
- 2009 Newfoundland and Labrador municipal elections
- 2013 Newfoundland and Labrador municipal elections
- 2017 Newfoundland and Labrador municipal elections
- 2021 Newfoundland and Labrador municipal elections
- 2025 Newfoundland and Labrador municipal elections

== See also ==
- Municipal elections in Canada
