= 2024 New Brunswick municipal by-elections =

The 2024 New Brunswick municipal by-elections were held throughout the year to fill vacancies in various municipalities.

== December elections ==
By-elections were held on December 9, 2024.

=== Saint John ===
==== Ward 3 ====
A by-election was held in Ward 3 on December 9, 2024, to replace David Hickey, who was elected to the Legislative Assembly of New Brunswick in the 2024 provincial election. Eleven candidates ran for the position.

Candidate	Votes	%
Mariah Darling	375	32.02%
Ryan Moore	269	22.97%
Adam Donnelly	114	9.74%
Kevin M. McCann	114	9.74%
Andrew Miller	70	5.98%
Lisa Morris	67	5.72%
P.J. Duncan	45	3.84%
Bryan Wilson	44	3.76%
Arty Watson	36	3.07%
Jennifer Thompson	24	2.05%
Dan Benoit	13	1.11%
Total	1,171	100.00%
