= Robert Hutchinson (Canadian politician) =

Canadian politician

Robert Hutchinson (19 January 1802 – 30 April 1866) was a merchant and political figure in Prince Edward Island. He was the first mayor of Charlottetown, serving from 1855 to 1857.

He was born in Charlottetown, the son of Samuel Hutchinson and Elizabeth Wilder. He opened a store there where he sold dry goods and groceries. In 1829, he married Susanna Harvie. From 1829 to 1844, he served as jailer for Queen's County jail. Hutchinson was a justice of the peace for the county from 1847 to 1852, when he resigned to protest interference by governor Alexander Bannerman. He was appointed again but resigned again in 1853 to protest the appointment of Edward Whelan as a justice of the peace; Hutchinson was named to the office again in 1854. He served as a town assessor, an assessment treasurer and captain of a fire engine company for Charlottetown. Hutchinson also served as a member of the board of health. He was named to the province's Legislative Council in 1859, serving until 1862. Hutchinson died at home in Charlottetown at age 64.
