= George MacDonald (Prince Edward Island politician) =

Canadian politician

George MacDonald is a former teacher and Canadian politician.

MacDonald has a long history in municipal politics in his home province of Prince Edward Island. He served as a councillor for the city of Charlottetown through the 1980s and 1990s before being elected as the 44th mayor in 1997. He served in that position for two terms until deciding not to run again in 2003.

MacDonald was selected as the Progressive Conservative candidate for the provincial electoral district of Charlottetown-Rochford Square in the 2003 PEI general election and lost to Liberal leader Robert Ghiz.
