= 2026 Prince Edward Island municipal elections =

Election in Canada

- November 2, 2026

Municipal elections in Prince Edward Island were held on November 2, 2026. Voters in the Canadian province of Prince Edward Island elected mayors, councillors, and all other elected officials in all of the province's municipalities.

== Charlottetown ==
=== Mayor ===
The results for mayor of Charlottetown were as follows:

Candidates	Votes	%
Amir Zuccolo	5,125	39.33
Philip Brown (X)	3,580	27.47
Mitchell G. Tweel	2,054	15.76
Cecil Villard	1,738	13.33
Daniel Mullen	337	2.586
Daniel Cousins	102	0.078
Anthony Fitzpatrick	94	0.072

=== City Council ===
Results for Charlottetown City Council were as follows:

Candidates	Votes	%
Ward One
Matt Pelletier	565	44.38
Kim Devine	497	39.04
Sasha Andric	127	9.976
Battison Andrea	84	6.598
Ward two
Justin Muttart (X)	Acclaimed	
Ward Three
Norman Beck (X)	Acclaimed	
Ward Four
Ted Kitson	493	34.66
Andee Morgan	318	22.36
Rima Rashed	231	16.24
Kenneth Murnaghan	192	13.50
Ryan Mann	188	13.22
Ward Five
Kevin Ramsay (X)	594	62.13
Tazul Riad	362	37.86
Ward Six
Sue Fraser	785	59.74
Doug Currie	529	40.25
Ward Seven
John Mcaleer (X)	Acclaimed	
Ward Eight
Corey Driscoll	1,057	61.27
Trevor Mackinnon (X)	668	38.72
Ward Nine
Julie McCabe (X)	969	69.51
Jay Patel	180	12.91
Dr. Kapil Dev Chauhan	128	9.182
Jaime Tinoco	117	8.393
Ward Ten
Terry Bernard (X)	865	77.30
Ryan Cooke	254	22.69

== Cornwall ==
=== Mayor ===
Candidates	Votes	%
Minerva McCourt (X)	Acclaimed	

=== Town Council ===
Candidates	Votes	%
Cory Stevenson (X)	1,424	17.66
Chantal Batchilder	1,278	15.85
Rita Campbell	1,240	15.38
Steven Campbell (X)	1,176	14.58
Corey Frizzell (X)	1,158	14.36
Chase Currie	914	11.33
Dean Martin	872	10.81

== Stratford ==
The results for mayor of Stratford are as follows:

=== Mayor ===
Candidates	Votes	%
Steve Ogden (X)	Acclaimed	

=== Town Council ===
Candidates	Votes	%
Ward one
Gordie Cox (X)	477	29.51
Dylan Cooper	442	27.35
Gail MacDonald	359	22.21
Derek Kronemeyer	338	20.91
Ward Two
Jeff McCentee	Acclaimed	
Patrick Ross	Acclaimed	
Ward Three
Steve Gallant (X)	543	36.91
Ron Dowling	397	26.98
Wilfred MacDonald	357	24.26
Kevin Macisaac	174	11.82

== Summerside ==
The results for mayor of Summerside are as follows:

=== Mayor ===
Candidates	Votes	%
Cory Snow (X)	4,106	73.94
Basil Stewaert	1,447	26.05

=== City Council ===
Candidates	Votes	%
Ward One
Bruce MacDougall (X)	Acclaimed	
Ward Two
Justin Doiron (X)	Acclaimed	
Ward Three
Nicholas Cameron (X)	Acclaimed	
Ward Four
Pete Peters	Acclaimed	
Ward Five
Ken Trenholm (X)	498	61.55
Tim Hockin	311	38.44
Ward Six
Norma McColeman (X)	293	51.49
Mark Greenan	276	48.50
Ward Seven
Bill Martin	Acclaimed	
Ward Eight
Carrie Adams (X)	Acclaimed	

== Three Rivers ==
The results for mayor of Three Rivers were as follows:

=== Mayor ===
Candidates	Votes	%
Janice Macbeth	1,598	57.23
Anne Forrester-Van Donkersgoed	775	27.75
Robert Rafuse	340	12.17
Carla Morgan	79	2.829

=== Town Council ===
Candidates	Votes	%
Ward One
Derek Nicholson	509	40.17
Charlie Hicken	394	31.09
Mike Monaghan	364	28.72
Ward Two
Brenda MacDougall	339	29.94
Wayne Spin (X)	328	28.97
Rick Beck	242	21.37
Lori Trainor	223	19.69
Ward Three
Mary Van Den Broek Grant	485	41.45
David McGrath	387	33.07
Kevin Jenkins	298	25.47
Ward Four
Cindy Maclean (X)	Acclaimed	
Gary Hales	Acclaimed	
