= 2026 Manitoba municipal elections =

- October 28, 2026

Municipal elections in Manitoba were held on October 28, 2026. Voters in the Canadian province of Manitoba elected mayors, reeves, councillors, school board trustees, and all other elected officials in all of the province's municipalities. Municipal elections in Manitoba are non-partisan.

== Brandon ==
Results for Brandon are as follows:

=== Mayoral election ===
Mayoral candidate	Vote	%
Jeff Fawcett (X)	5,752	54.28
Len Isleifson	4,845	45.72

=== Brandon City Council ===
Candidate	Vote	%
Ward 1
Ron Shaluk	688	51.85
Heather Karrouze (X)	639	48.15
Ward 2
Deveryn Ross	309	42.33
Sonikile Tembo	232	31.78
Buchi Onuke	107	14.66
Sunday Frangi	82	11.23
Ward 3
Craig Shanks	568	42.71
Kevin Chambers	317	23.83
Quentin Derhak	302	22.71
Enver Naidoo	143	10.75
Ward 4
Shaun Cameron (X)	1,058	90.20
James Epp	115	9.80
Ward 5
Greg Hildebrand (X)	766	75.47
Bhavesh Patel	249	24.53
Ward 6
Bruce Luebke (X)	Acclaimed	
Ward 7
Shawn Berry (X)	970	66.67
Quentin Robinson	485	33.33
Ward 8
Jason Splett (X)	618	67.61
Ketan Patel	202	22.10
Dhara Patel	94	10.28
Ward 9
Norah Woychyshyn	281	36.83
Scott Pedlow	263	34.47
Keith Waterfield	219	28.70
Ward 10
Tyson Tame (X)	720	68.70
Mitesh Patel	328	31.30

== Brokenhead ==
Results for reeve in the Rural Municipality of Brokenhead are as follows:

=== Reeve ===
Reeve candidate	Vote	%
Luke Ingeberg	854	60.35
Ashley Buller	561	39.65

== Dauphin ==
Results for mayor in Dauphin are as follows:

=== Mayor ===
Mayoral candidate	Vote	%
Steve Sobering	1,136	57.40
Keith Durston	752	38.00
Carter Taylor-Luke	91	4.60

== East St. Paul ==
Results for mayor in the Rural Municipality of East St. Paul are as follows:

=== Mayor ===
Mayoral candidate	Vote	%
Mike Watson	3,206	72.91
Orest Horechko	775	17.63
Carla Devlin (X)	416	9.46

== Flin Flon ==
Results for mayor in Flin Flon are as follows:

=== Mayor ===
Mayoral candidate	Vote	%
Roger Armstrong	687	44.04
Alison Dallas	641	41.09
Leslie Beck	232	14.87

== Gimli ==
Results for mayor in the Rural Municipality of Gimli are as follows:

=== Mayor ===
Mayoral candidate	Vote	%
Daphne Markusson	1,337	40.36
Andy Damm	1,056	31,87
Kevin Chudd (X)	920	27.77

== Hanover ==
Results for reeve in the Rural Municipality of Hanover are as follows:

=== Reeve ===
Reeve candidate	Vote	%
Jim Funk (X)	Acclaimed	

== La Broquerie ==
Results for reeve in the Rural Municipality of La Broquerie are as follows:

=== Reeve ===
Reeve candidate	Vote	%
Ivan Normandeau (X)	857	50.26
Lewis Weiss	848	49.74

== Macdonald ==
Results for reeve in the Rural Municipality of Macdonald are as follows:

=== Reeve ===
Reeve candidate	Vote	%
Douglas Dobrowolski	1,073	59.45
Paul Pfrimmer	732	40.55

== Morden ==
Results for mayor in Morden are as follows:

=== Mayor ===
Mayoral candidate	Vote	%
Ernie Epp	1,802	62.79
Brenda Klassen	728	25.37
Nancy Penner (X)	340	11.85

== Neepawa ==
Results for mayor in Neepawa are as follows:

=== Mayor ===
Mayoral candidate	Vote	%
Darryl Gerrard	Acclaimed	

== Niverville ==
Results for mayor in the town of Niverville are as follows:

=== Mayor ===
Mayoral candidate	Vote	%
Myron Dyck (X)	Acclaimed	

== Portage la Prairie (city) ==
Results for mayor in the city of Portage la Prairie are as follows:

=== Mayor ===
Mayoral candidate	Vote	%
Sharilyn Knox (X)	Acclaimed	

== Portage la Prairie (RM) ==
Results for reeve in the Rural Municipality of Portage la Prairie are as follows:

=== Reeve ===
Reeve candidate	Vote	%
Ian Alford	1,015	62.31
Roy Tufford (X)	614	37.69

== Rhineland ==
Results for reeve in the Municipality of Rhineland are as follows:

=== Reeve ===
Reeve candidate	Vote	%
Danny Penner	544	63.11
Kan Sawatzky	318	36.89

== Ritchot ==
Results for mayor in the Rural Municipality of Ritchot are as follows:

=== Mayor ===
Mayoral candidate	Vote	%
Shane Pelletier	Acclaimed	

== Rockwood ==
Results for reeve in the Rural Municipality of Rockwood are as follows:

=== Reeve ===
Reeve candidate	Vote	%
Roger Stearns	1,019	47.33
J. Wes Taplin (X)	664	30.84
Lana Hintz	470	21.83

== Selkirk ==
Results for mayor in Selkirk are as follows:

=== Mayor ===
Mayoral candidate	Vote	%
Larry Johannson (X)	Acclaimed	

== Springfield ==
Results for mayor in the Rural Municipality of Springfield are as follows:

=== Mayor ===
Mayoral candidate	Vote	%
Melinda Warren	2,370	43.69
Margaret Marion-Akins	2,029	37.40
Daniel Page	514	9.47
Edwin Giesbrecht	512	9.44

== St. Andrews ==
Results for mayor in the Rural Municipality of St. Andrews are as follows:

=== Mayor ===
Mayoral candidate	Vote	%
Ken Doornbos	1,500	52.95
Jim McInnis	1,333	47.05

== Stanley ==
Results for reeve in the Rural Municipality of Stanley are as follows:

=== Reeve ===
Reeve candidate	Vote	%
Ike Friesen (X)	Acclaimed	

== St. Clements ==
Results for mayor in the Rural Municipality of St. Clements are as follows:

Mayoral candidate	Vote	%
Rosalie Drysdale	1,524	41.09
Alan Lagimodiere	1,317	35.51
Debbie Fiebelkorn (X)	868	23.40

== Ste. Anne (RM) ==
Results for reeve in the Rural Municipality of Ste. Anne are as follows:

=== Reeve ===
Reeve candidate	Vote	%
Richard Pelletier (X)	Acclaimed	

== Steinbach ==
Results for mayor in the city of Steinbach are as follows:

=== Mayor ===
Mayoral candidate	Vote	%
Earl Funk (X)	Acclaimed	

== Stonewall ==
Results for mayor in the town of Stonewall are as follows:

=== Mayor ===
Mayoral candidate	Vote	%
Clive Hinds	1,135	53.49
Sandra Smith (X)	987	46.51

== Taché ==
Results for mayor in the Rural Municipality of Taché are as follows:

=== Mayor ===
Mayoral candidate	Vote	%
Justin Denis Bohémier	1,206	40.13
Armand Poirier (X)	1,090	36.27
Andy Brandt	709	23.59

== The Pas ==
Results for mayor in the town of The Pas are as follows:

=== Mayor ===
Mayoral candidate	Vote	%
Herb Jaques	527	56.48
Ralph McLean	278	29.80
James Ridderikhoff	128	13.82

== Thompson ==
Results in Thompson were as follows:

=== Mayor ===
Mayoral candidate	Vote	%
Oswald Sawh	1,043	45.47
Colleen Smook (X)	863	37.62
Duncan Wong	388	16.91

== West St. Paul ==
Results for mayor in the Rural Municipality of West St. Paul are as follows:

Mayoral candidate	Vote	%
Dorothy Kleiber	1,428	41.67
Stan Parag	970	28.30
Peter Truijen (X)	764	22.29
Iqbal Sandhu	265	7.73

== Winkler ==
Results for mayor in the city of Winkler are as follows:

=== Mayor ===
Mayoral candidate	Vote	%
Henry Siemens (X)	Acclaimed	

== Winnipeg ==
Incumbent mayor Scott Gillingham, elected in 2022 with 27.54% of the vote, will seek a second term.
