= Philip Brown (Charlottetown politician) =

Canadian politician

46th Mayor of Charlottetown
- Incumbent
- Assumed office December 6, 2018
- Preceded by: Clifford J. Lee

Personal details
- Born: 1958 or 1959 (age 66–67)
- Education: University of Prince Edward Island
- Profession: Teacher
- Website: http://philipbrownmayor.ca

Philip Brown (born 1958 or 1959) is the 46th and current mayor of Charlottetown, Prince Edward Island, Canada. He was elected in the general municipal election held on November 5, 2018, and took office on December 6. Brown was defeated in the 2026 Charlottetown municipal election by Amir Zuccolo.

Brown served two terms on Charlottetown City Council from 2001 to 2006. He ran for mayor unsuccessfully in 2010 and 2014.
