= 2024 Nova Scotia municipal elections =

- October 19, 2024

Municipal elections in Nova Scotia were held on October 19, 2024. Voters in the Canadian province of Nova Scotia elected mayors, councillors, and all other elected officials in all of the province's municipalities. Municipal elections in Nova Scotia are non-partisan.

== Amherst ==
Mayoral candidate	Vote	%
Rob Small	2,359	61.27
David Kogon (X)	1,491	38.73

== Bridgewater ==
Mayoral candidate	Vote	%
David Mitchell (X)	Acclaimed	

== Cape Breton Regional Municipality ==
=== Mayor ===
Mayoral candidate	Vote	%
Cecil Clarke	13,130	33.69
Joe Ward	9,370	24.04
Rankin MacSween	8,971	23.02
James Edwards	4,901	12.57
Archie MacKinnon	1,637	4.20
Carla George	337	0.86
Kevin MacEachern	239	0.61
Donnie Bacich	204	0.52
Vince Hall	188	0.48

=== Cape Breton Regional Council ===
Candidate	Vote	%
District 1
Gordon MacDonald (X)	Acclaimed	
District 2
Earlene MacMullin (X)	Acclaimed	
District 3
Blue Marshall	922	35.90
Michael Vickers	762	29.67
Glen Murrant	488	19.00
Tom Vickers	396	15.42
District 4
Steve Gillespie (X)	Acclaimed	
District 5
Eldon MacDonald (X)	2,007	66.88
Bennett MacIntyre	994	33.12
District 6
Glenn Paruch (X)	Acclaimed	
District 7
Steve Parsons (X)	Acclaimed	
District 8
Steven MacNeil	1,443	40.92
Derrick Kennedy	1,418	40.22
Shawn Lesnick	665	18.86
District 9
Dave MacKeigan	1,539	49.44
Ken Tracey (X)	1,310	42.08
Kyron Coombes	264	8.48
District 10
Paul Nickituk	2,405	75.20
William Martin	456	14.26
Matthew Boyd	337	10.54
District 11
Darren O'Quinn (X)	1,190	50.55
Louie Piovesan	1,164	49.45
District 12
Kim Sheppard	1,594	48.70
Lorne Green (X)	1,429	43.66
Gary B. Borden	179	5.47
Krys Maher	71	2.17

== Colchester County ==
Mayoral candidate	Vote	%
Christine Blair (X)	5,784	51.53
Geoff Stewart	5,440	48.47

== Cumberland County ==
Mayoral candidate	Vote	%
Rod Gilroy	3,739	76.82
Stan Blenkhorn	1,128	23.18

== Halifax ==
=== Councillors standing down ===
Four councillors are retiring:

- District 14, Lisa Blackburn
- District 9, Shawn Cleary
- District 16, Tim Outhit
- District 13, Pam Lovelace

=== Mayor ===
- Mayor Michael Savage (retiring)

== Kentville ==
Mayoral candidate	Vote	%
Andrew Zebian	1,222	47.68
Brent Platt	820	31.99
Paula Huntley	521	20.33

== Kings County ==
Mayoral candidate	Vote	%
Dave Corkum	5,259	41.63
Pauline Raven	3,134	24.81
Martha Armstrong	2,390	18.92
Madonna Spinazola	1,849	14.64

=== Kings County Municipal Council ===
Candidate	Vote	%
District 1
Everett MacPherson	Acclaimed	
District 2
Doug Gates	954	63.68
Lexie Burgess (X)	544	36.32
District 3
Robbie Hiltz	1,182	66.37
Wayne Atwater	599	33.63
District 4
Riley Peckford	Acclaimed	
District 5
Tim Harding (X)	547	42.27
Ted Palmer	410	31.68
Mary Ritchie	209	16.15
Shannon Parker	128	9.89
District 6
Bob Best	779	46.15
Paul Dixon	376	22.27
Oonagh Proudfoot	284	16.82
Rob Buchan	249	14.75
District 7
Emily Lutz (X)	1,014	74.50
Shawn Buchan	347	25.50
District 8
Christina Sappington	683	54.12
Kevin Davison (X)	448	35.50
Shawn Maxwell	131	10.38
District 9
Peter Allen (X)	589	45.10
Denise Bonnell	504	38.59
Ryan Levy	213	16.31

== District of the Municipality of Lunenburg ==
Mayoral candidate	Vote	%
Elspeth McLean-Wile	6,240	62.45
Carolyn Bolivar-Getson (X)	3,752	37.55

== New Glasgow ==
Mayoral candidate	Vote	%
Nancy Dicks (X)	2,360	80.79
Mark Firth	561	19.21

== Pictou (Town) ==
Mayoral candidate	Vote	%
Jim Ryan (X)	Acclaimed	
Councillors
Krista Fulton (X)	1123	25.8
Nadine LeBlanc (X)	964	22.1
Robert Fry (X)	830	19.1
Matt Harris (X)	758	17.4
Dan Currie	676	15.5

== Region of Queens Municipality ==
Mayoral candidate	Vote	%
Scott Christian	2,462	52.07
Terry Doucette	2,266	47.93

== Truro ==
Mayoral candidate	Vote	%
Cathy Hinton	Acclaimed	

== West Hants Regional Municipality ==
Mayoral Candidate	Vote	%
Abraham Zebian (X)	3,711	45.32
Chuck Porter	2,174	26.55
Jeff Hartt	1,993	24.34
Kjeld Mizpah (KJ) Conyers-Steede	311	3.80

== Wolfville ==
Mayoral Candidate	Vote	%
Jodi MacKay	1,247	66.22
Wendy Donovan (X)	636	33.78

== Yarmouth (Town) ==
Mayoral Candidate	Vote	%
Pam Mood (X)	1,255	52.20
Gurdeep Brar	1,149	47.80
