= 2025 Alberta municipal elections =

Local elections in Canada

- October 20, 2025
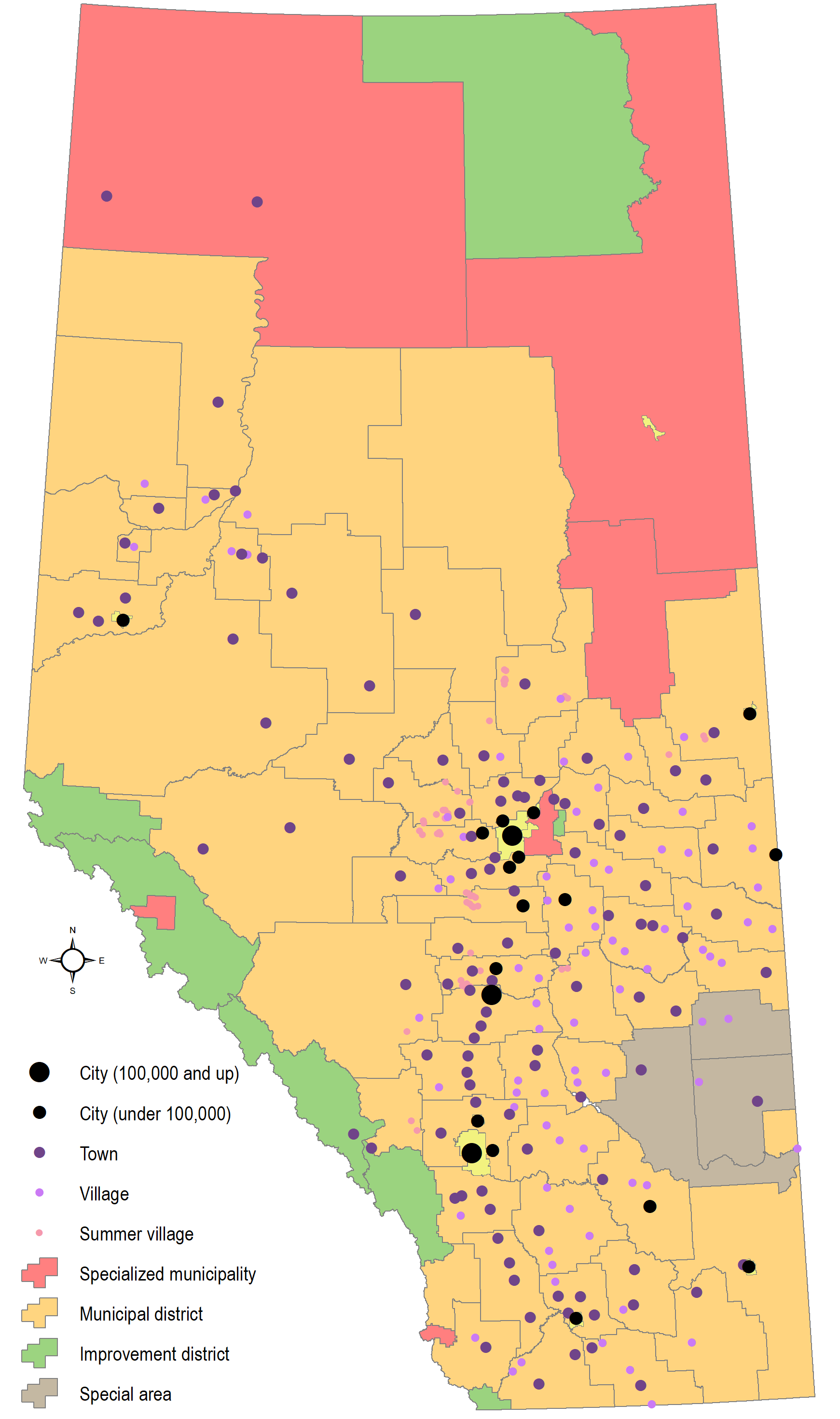
- Alberta's 344 municipalities (19 cities, 106 towns, 80 villages, 51 summer villages, 6 specialized municipalities, 63 municipal districts, 7 improvement districts, and 3 special areas) as of July 2021

Municipal elections in Alberta were held on October 20, 2025. Voters in the Canadian province of Alberta elected mayors, reeves, councillors, aldermen, school board trustees, and all other elected officials in all of the province's municipalities (except Lloydminster), towns, villages, specialized municipalities, and municipal districts.

== Background ==
Nominations for the election opened on January 1, 2025, and closed on September 22, 2025. The government of Alberta tabled legislation to reform the municipal government system; the Municipal Affairs Statutes Amendment Act, includes two pieces of legislation: the Local Authorities Election Act (LAEA) and the Municipal Government Act (Alberta) (MGA). The proposed changes enabled municipal political parties but only as a "pilot project" in Calgary and Edmonton. The Executive Council of Alberta also has the power to remove councillors.

New provincial legislation also outlawed the use of electronic vote tabulators, meaning all votes would have to be counted by hand, resulting in delays in vote counting.

== Cities ==
The following are the municipalities incorporated as cities in Alberta that did vote in the 2025 Alberta municipal election. All cities in Alberta voted at the same time, except for Lloydminster. Incumbents are marked by an X, and elected candidates are bolded.

=== Airdrie ===
Mayor

Candidate	Vote	%
**Heather Spearman**	**5,291**	**43.76**
Tina Petrow	4,331	35.82
Dave Douglass	1,170	9.68
Vern Raincock	582	4.81
Dylan Harty	416	3.44
Eeshnah Qureshi	194	1.60
Usman Mahmood	106	0.88

Council

Top six candidates are elected at large

Candidate	Vote	%
**Ron Chapman** (X)	**5,834**	**9.72**
**Candice Kolson** (X)	**5,592**	**9.31**
**Chris Glass**	**4,712**	**7.85**
**Kristen Shima**	**4,325**	**7.20**
**Simisola Obasan**	**4,093**	**6.82**
**Chad Stewart**	**3,982**	**6.63**
Al Jones (X)	3,907	6.51
Darrell Belyk (X)	3,629	6.04
Jay Raymundo	3,484	5.80
Tammy Yantz	3,269	5.44
Christopher Bakke	3,087	5.14
Anthony Morvillo	2,875	4.79
Karen Whittenbury	2,166	3.61
Tomi Adenipekun	1,921	3.20
Craig Dansereau	1,488	2.48
Maulik Shah	1,127	1.88
Kurt Bigoraj	1,045	1.74
Kathlene McCuaig	986	1.64
Rekha Mehay	868	1.45
Darrin Budzak	604	1.01
Shaganpreet Singh Sooch	410	0.68
Kaur Inderjeet	392	0.65
Tanveer Taj	253	0.42

=== Beaumont ===
Mayor

Candidate	Vote	%
**Lisa Vanderkwaak**	**1,602**	**39.48**
Catherine McCook	1,404	34.60
Gil Poitras	881	21.71
Duane (Scott) Mann	171	4.21

=== Brooks ===
Mayor

Candidate	Vote	%
**Norm Gerestein**	**1,804**	**62.29**
Joel Goodnough	1,092	37.71

=== Calgary ===
Incumbent mayor Jyoti Gondek, elected in 2021, did seek re-election for a second term. She was defeated by Jeromy Farkas.

=== Camrose ===
Mayor

Candidate	Vote	%
**PJ Stasko** (X)	**2,146**	**63.23**
Chris MacIntyre	592	17.44
Shauna Chrabaszcz	502	14.79
Norm Bloomfield	154	4.54

=== Chestermere ===
Mayor

Candidate	Vote	%
**Shannon Dean** (X)	**4,232**	**89.79**
Kofi Poku	481	10.21

=== Cold Lake ===
Mayor

Candidate	Vote	%
**Bob Mattice**	**2,148**	**71.50**
Sherri Buckle	784	26.10
Ty Mikolas	72	2.40

=== Edmonton ===
Incumbent mayor Amarjeet Sohi, elected in 2021, did not seek re-election. He will be succeeded by Andrew Knack.

=== Fort Saskatchewan ===
Mayor

Candidate	Vote	%
**Lisa Makin**	**3,636**	**61.71**
Jibs Abitoye	2,256	38.29

=== Grande Prairie ===
Mayor

Candidate	Vote	%
**Jackie Clayton** (X)	**3,491**	**37.82**
Kristopher James Arcand	1,220	13.22
Charlene Marie Nelson	1,051	11.39
James Flack	1,046	11.33
Jason Jones	1,041	11.28
Kris Kinney	821	8.89
Bryan Petryshyn	487	5.28
Durque Babunga	74	0.80

Council

Top eight candidates are elected at large

Candidate	Vote	%
**Grant Berg** (X)	**4,671**	**8.96**
**Dylan Bressey** (X)	**4,196**	**8.05**
**Len Auger**	**3,266**	**6.26**
**Jena Flach**	**3,253**	**6.24**
**Wade Pilat** (X)	**3,014**	**5.78**
**Kevin O'Toole** (X)	**2,803**	**5.38**
**Mike O'Connor** (X)	**2,740**	**5.26**
**Chris Thiessen** (X)	**2,727**	**5.23**
Lionel Frey	2,375	4.56
Gladys Blackmore (X)	2,309	4.43
Yad Minhas	2,293	4.40
Kendra Sledding	2,289	4.39
Phil Troyer	2,288	4.39
Solomon Okhifoh	2,063	3.96
Craig Reid	1,807	3.47
Michael Ouellette	1,662	3.19
Waqar Khan	1,565	3.00
J. Patrick Croken	1,289	2.47
Jun Bibangco	1,218	2.34
Rob Wasylciw	1,194	2.29
Garry Singh	985	1.89
Lynn Hoddinott	813	1.56
Josh Cercel	603	1.16
Charles John Poole	386	0.74
Glyn Gruner	324	0.62

=== Lacombe ===
Mayor

Candidate	Vote	%
**Thalia Hibbs**	**1,155**	**37.09**
Grant Creasey (X)	1,000	32.11
Reuben Calliou	959	30.80

=== Leduc ===
Mayor

Candidate	Vote	%
**Lars Hansen**	**4,224**	**60.12**
Don Inkster	1,558	22.17
Sam Dalupang	1,244	17.71

=== Lethbridge ===
Incumbent mayor Blaine Hyggen, elected in 2021, won re-election for a second term.

=== Medicine Hat ===
Mayor

Candidate	Vote	%
**Linnsie Clark** (X)	**5,875**	**32.42**
Drew Allan Roy Barnes	5,108	28.19
Kris Samraj	3,604	19.89
Andy McGrogan	2,391	13.19
Alan Rose	834	4.60
Mark Fisher	311	1.72

Council

Top eight candidates are elected at large

Candidate	Vote	%
**Yusuf Ibrahim Mohammed**	**8,242**	**7.76**
**Ted Clugston**	**7,757**	**7.30**
**Stuart Young**	**7,006**	**6.60**
**Chris Hellman**	**6,610**	**6.22**
**Bill Cocks**	**4,455**	**4.19**
**Cheryl Phaff**	**4,378**	**4.12**
**Dan Reynish**	**3,969**	**3.74**
**Brian Varga**	**3,870**	**3.64**
Adam Daniel Koch	3,757	3.54
Robert Dumanowski (X)	3,756	3.54
Kirsten Spek	3,607	3.40
Alison Van Dyke (X)	3,139	2.96
Pamela Kunz	3,134	2.95
Brock Hale	2,998	2.82
Immanuel Moritz	2,916	2.75
Laura Lee Butterfield	2,819	2.65
Steven Pudwell	2,808	2.64
Brian Edward Robinson	2,774	2.61
Jay Hitchen	2,199	2.07
Kirby Schafer	2,011	1.89
Kevin Monson	1,927	1.81
Gordon Edward Cowan	1,907	1.80
Ron Fode	1,878	1.77
Shila Sharps (X)	1,695	1.60
Troy Wason	1,637	1.54
Michael Reid	1,538	1.45
Dave Toth	1,478	1.39
Stephen Campbell	1,462	1.38
Don Fedoruk	1,440	1.36
Randall Noble	1,261	1.19
Kelly Allard	1,224	1.15
Mark Douglas Albrecht	1,207	1.14
Jodi Faith	1,194	1.12
C.K. Ellis	1,110	1.05
Clayton Stevens	998	0.94
Dana Eric Christensen	574	0.54
Donald Brent Knudsen	556	0.52
Kaleb Orge	471	0.44
Michael Starner	437	0.41

=== Red Deer ===
Incumbent Mayor Ken Johnston did not seek re-election to a second term.

2025 Red Deer Mayoral election
- October 20, 2025
Candidate	Cindy Jefferies	Gareth Scott
Popular vote	6,237	3,483
Percentage	40.56%	22.65%
Candidate	Victor Doerksen	Lawrence Lee
Popular vote	3,143	2,215
Percentage	20.44%	14.41%
Mayor before election
Ken Johnston
Elected mayor
Cindy Jefferies

Mayor

Candidate	Vote	%
**Cindy Jefferies**	**6,237**	**40.56**
Gareth Scott	3,483	22.65
Victor Doerksen	3,143	20.44
Lawrence Lee	2,215	14.41
John Gallagher	298	1.94

Council

Red Deer elects eight councillors. Of the current eight, three (Cindy Jefferies, Lawrence Lee, and Victor Doerksen) ran for Mayor, four (Dianne Wyntjes, Chad Krahn, Kraymer Barnstable, and Bruce Buruma) ran for re-election, and one (Vesa Higham) did not run for re-election.

Candidate	Vote	%
**Tristin Brisbois**	**6,703**	**7.21**
**Cassandra Curtis**	**6,422**	**6.90**
**Chad Krahn** (X)	**6,249**	**6.72**
**Kraymer Barnstable** (X)	**6,235**	**6.70**
**Dianne Wyntjes** (X)	**6,069**	**6.52**
**Jaelene Tweedle**	**5,635**	**6.06**
**Adam Goodwin**	**5,290**	**5.69**
**Bruce Buruma** (X)	**5,241**	**5.63**
Calvin Goulet-Jones	5,050	5.43
Hans Huizing	4,810	5.17
Brandon Bouchard	4,528	4.87
Ashley Macdonald	3,832	4.12
Buck Buchanan	3,660	3.93
Zainab Mohamoud	3,478	3.74
Thomas Sypkes	3,459	3.72
Gabriel Beck	3,370	3.62
Gail Parks	2,809	3.02
Calvin Yzerman	2,265	2.43
Haley Wile	1,986	2.13
Christian Cométe	1,843	1.98
Kevin M. Klerks	1,699	1.83
Don Robinson	1,296	1.40
Greg Martin	656	0.71
Anthony Klywak	444	0.48

=== Spruce Grove ===
Mayor

Candidate	Vote	%
**Jeff Acker** (X)	**4,093**	**71.62**
Chantal Saramaga-McKenzie	1,335	23.36
Britton McMullen	287	5.02

=== St. Albert ===
Mayor

Candidate	Vote	%
**Scott Olivieri**	**9,453**	**57.87**
Wes Brodhead	4,965	30.40
Rick Dory	1,570	9.61
Jared Eglinski	311	1.90
Bakhshish Singh Kang	35	0.21

Council

Top six candidates are elected at large

Candidate	Vote	%
**Neil Korotash**	**9,717**	**11.88**
**Ken MacKay** (X)	**7,778**	**9.51**
**Sheena Hughes** (X)	**7,416**	**9.07**
**Shelley Biermanski** (X)	**6,307**	**7.71**
**Sandy Clark**	**6,048**	**7.40**
**Amanda Patrick**	**5,710**	**6.98**
Alan Luck	5,122	6.26
Kristi Rouse	4,909	6.00
Gilbert Cantin	3,590	4.39
Billy Harquail	3,352	4.10
Kevin Malinowski	3,321	4.06
Leonard Wilkins	3,197	3.91
Jackie Sargent	3,191	3.90
Crystal Gossmann	3,127	3.82
Mark Cassidy	3,015	3.69
Heather McQuillan	2,689	3.29
Skye Vermeulen	2,112	2.58
Kerry Samardzija	810	0.99
Demetrius Kuc	353	0.43

=== Wetaskiwin ===
Mayor

Candidate	Vote	%
**Joseph A. Branco**	**1,708**	**51.37**
Tyler Gandam (X)	948	28.51
Glenn Ruecker	669	20.12

== Towns ==
The following are the municipalities incorporated as towns in Alberta that did vote in the 2025 Alberta municipal election. Unless otherwise stated, each town elects the top six candidates for council at large. Incumbents are marked by an X.

=== Athabasca ===
Mayor

Candidate	Vote	%
Robert Balay (X)		
Robert Woito		

=== Banff ===
Mayor

Candidate	Vote	%
**Corrie DiManno** (X)	Acclaimed	

Council

Candidate	Vote	%
**Michelle Backhouse**	742	41.5%
Allan Buckingham	740	41.4%
Grant Canning (X)	711	39.8%
Theodore (Ted) Christensen (X)	535	30.0%
Seth Enriquez	338	18.9%
**David Fullerton**	888	49.7%
**Marc Ledwidge**	796	44.6%
Chip (Cheryl) Olver (X)	521	29.2%
**Barb Pelham** (X)	890	49.8%
Hugh Pettigrew (X)	399	22.3%
**Kaylee Ram** (X)	823	46.1%
**Brian Standish**	760	42.6%
Mark Walker	476	26.7%
Lesley Young	385	21.6%

=== Bentley ===
Mayor

Candidate	Vote	%
**Pamela Hansen**	**221**	**59**
Greg Arthur Rathjen (X)	145	39

Council

Candidate	Vote	%
**Dale Grimsdale** (X)	**284**	**76**
**Kristy Anne Klinger**	**252**	**68**
**Devin Davey**	**242**	**65**
**David Rogers**	**188**	**51**
Lenore Eastman (X)	146	39
Brenda Valiquette (X)	113	30

=== Blackfalds ===
Mayor

Candidate	Vote	%
**Laura Svab**	**713**	**63.43**
Jamie Hoover (X)	411	36.57

=== Bonnyville ===
Mayor

Candidate	Vote	%
**Elisa Brosseau** (X)	Acclaimed	

=== Canmore ===
Mayor

Candidate	Vote	%
**Sean Krausert** (X)	**3,009**	**64.57**
Ed Russell	1,651	35.43

=== Coaldale ===
Mayor

Candidate	Vote	%
**Jack Van Rijn** (X)	**1,176**	**62.85**
Henry Doeve	695	37.15

=== Coalhurst ===
Mayor

Candidate	Vote	%
Scott Akkermans	199	30.33
Dennis Cassie	160	24.39
**Deb Florence**	**297**	**45.27**

Council

Candidate	Vote	%
Heather Wanda Caldwell (X)	274	40.77
**Lori Harasem**	**459**	**68.30**
**Jesse Potrie (X)**	**405**	**60.26**
**Brody Prete**	**433**	**64.43**
**Colin Slingsby**	**440**	**65.47**

=== Cochrane ===
Mayor

Candidate	Vote	%
**Morgan Nagel**	**5,543**	**57.00**
Jeff Genung (X)	2,935	30.18
Dean Hopkins	975	10.03
Tony Archer	272	2.80

=== Devon ===
Mayor

Candidate	Vote	%
**Jeff Craddock** (X)	**955**	**56.11**
Blake Adams	747	43.89

=== Didsbury ===
Mayor

Candidate	Vote	%
**Chris Little**	**783**	**61.85**
Melynda Crampton	380	30.02
Sheila Schulz	103	8.14

=== Drayton Valley ===
Mayor

Candidate	Vote	%
**Nancy Dodds** (X)	**663**	**41.33**
Matthew MacDonald	547	34.10
Kody Trafiak	394	24.56

=== Drumheller ===
Mayor

Candidate	Vote	%
**Tony Miglecz**	**832**	**42.95**
Larry Coney	640	33.04
Lana Phillips	465	24.01

=== Edson ===
Mayor

Candidate	Vote	%
**Kevin Zahara** (X)	Acclaimed	

=== Elk Point ===
Mayor

Candidate	Vote	%

Council

Candidate	Vote	%

=== Fairview ===
Mayor

Candidate	Vote	%

Council

Candidate	Vote	%

=== Falher ===
Mayor

Candidate	Vote	%

Council

Candidate	Vote	%

=== Fort Macleod ===
Mayor

Candidate	Vote	%

Council

Candidate	Vote	%

=== Fox Creek ===
Mayor

Candidate	Vote	%

Council

Candidate	Vote	%

=== Gibbons (unofficial) ===
Mayor

Candidate	Vote	%
**Richard (Rick) Henderson**	534	58.75
Dale Yushchyshyn	355	39.05

Council

Candidate	Vote	%
**Travis Currie**	684	75.25
**Ashley Morrison**	599	65.90
**Darrell Burak**	556	61.17
**Darren Longstaff**	530	58.31
**Sharla St. Germain**	403	44.33
**Robert Simonowits**	396	43.56
Brenda Campbell-St.Onge	291	32.01
Jaycinth Julian Millante (X)	273	30.03
Laura Laurie	266	29.26
Willis Kozak (X)	180	19.80
Loraine Berry (X)	162	17.82
Jonathan Derouin	144	15.84
Norman Sandahl (X)	85	9.35

=== Grimshaw ===
Mayor

Candidate	Vote	%

Council

Candidate	Vote	%

=== Hanna ===
Mayor

Candidate	Vote	%

Council

Candidate	Vote	%

=== Hardisty ===
Mayor

Candidate	Vote	%

Council

Candidate	Vote	%

=== High Level ===
Mayor

Candidate	Vote	%

Council

Candidate	Vote	%

=== High Prairie ===
Mayor

Candidate	Vote	%

Council

Candidate	Vote	%

=== High River ===
Mayor

Candidate	Vote	%
**Craig Snodgrass** (X)	**1,724**	**40.99**
Carol MacMillan	1,160	27.58
Ken Braat	845	20.09
Brenda Walsh	477	11.34

=== Hinton ===
Mayor

Candidate	Vote	%
**Brian LaBerge**	**1,222**	**52.24**
David Michael Rees	665	28.43
Nicholas Nissen (X)	452	19.32
Elected in bold. Incumbents (X).

Councillors

Top six candidates are elected at large

Candidate	Vote	%
**Kristen Chambers (X)**	**1375**	
Trevor Haas (X)	798	
Ryan Maguhn (X)	776	
**Natalie Charlton**	**1462**	
**Gail Dunn**	**1312**	
**Donald MacLean**	**1093**	
**William (Bill) McDonald**	**996**	
Lyla Mozel	853	
**Dewly Nelson**	**1271**	
Mike Storey	736	
Elected in bold. Incumbents (X).

=== Innisfail ===
Mayor

Candidate	Vote	%
**Jean Barclay** (X)	**1,381**	**68.67**
Sarah Verburg	630	31.33

=== Irricana ===
Mayor

Candidate	Vote	%

Council

Candidate	Vote	%

=== Killam ===
Mayor

Candidate	Vote	%

Council

Candidate	Vote	%

=== Lamont ===
Mayor

Candidate	Vote	%

Council

Candidate	Vote	%

=== Legal ===
Mayor

Candidate	Vote	%

Council

Candidate	Vote	%

=== Magrath ===
Mayor

Candidate	Vote	%

Council

Candidate	Vote	%

=== Manning ===
Mayor

Candidate	Vote	%

Council

Candidate	Vote	%

=== Mayerthorpe ===
Mayor

Candidate	Vote	%

Council

Candidate	Vote	%

=== McLennan ===
Mayor

Candidate	Vote	%

Council

Candidate	Vote	%

=== Milk River ===
Mayor

Candidate	Vote	%

Council

Candidate	Vote	%

=== Millet ===
Mayor

Candidate	Vote	%

Council

Candidate	Vote	%

=== Morinville ===
Mayor

Candidate	Vote	%
**Simon Boersma** (X)	Acclaimed	

=== Mundare ===
Mayor

Candidate	Vote	%

Council

Candidate	Vote	%

=== Nobleford ===
Mayor

Candidate	Vote	%

Council

Candidate	Vote	%

=== Okotoks ===
Mayor

Candidate	Vote	%
**Tanya Thorn** (X)	**2,985**	**41.88**
Dwight Koenning	2,204	30.92
Colin Langenberger	1,939	27.20

=== Olds ===
Mayor

Candidate	Vote	%
**Daniel Daley**	**1,266**	**62.46**
Michael Muzychka	761	37.54

=== Onoway ===
Mayor

Candidate	Vote	%

Council

Candidate	Vote	%

=== Oyen ===
Mayor

Candidate	Vote	%

Council

Candidate	Vote	%

=== Peace River ===
Mayor

Candidate	Vote	%
**Shelly Marie Shannon**	**1,105**	**71.20**
Elaine Manzer (X)	447	28.80

=== Picture Butte ===
Mayor

Candidate	Vote	%

Council

Candidate	Vote	%

=== Pincher Creek ===
Mayor

Candidate	Vote	%

Council

Candidate	Vote	%

=== Ponoka ===
Mayor

Candidate	Vote	%
**Kevin Ferguson** (X)	**1,138**	**86.15**
Edwin Geuder	183	13.85

=== Provost ===
Mayor

Candidate	Vote	%

Council

Candidate	Vote	%

=== Rainbow Lake ===
Mayor

Candidate	Vote	%

Council

Candidate	Vote	%

=== Redcliff ===
Mayor

Candidate	Vote	%
**Chris Czember**	**735**	**68.18**
Donald Leslie McRobb	343	31.82

=== Redwater ===
Mayor

Candidate	Vote	%

Council

Candidate	Vote	%

=== Rimbey ===
Mayor

Candidate	Vote	%

Council

Candidate	Vote	%

=== Rocky Mountain House ===
Mayor

Candidate	Vote	%
**Shane Boniface**	**1,000**	**65.53**
Len Phillips (X)	526	34.47

=== Sedgewick ===
Mayor

Candidate	Vote	%

Council

Candidate	Vote	%

=== Sexsmith ===
Mayor

Candidate	Vote	%

Council

Candidate	Vote	%

=== Slave Lake ===
Mayor

Candidate	Vote	%
**Frankie Ward** (X)	Acclaimed	

=== Smoky Lake ===
Mayor

Candidate	Vote	%

Council

Candidate	Vote	%

=== Spirit River ===
Mayor

Candidate	Vote	%

Council

Candidate	Vote	%

=== St. Paul ===
Mayor

Candidate	Vote	%
**Glenn Andersen**	**955**	**61.02**
Sylvie Smyl	610	38.98

=== Stettler ===
Mayor

Candidate	Vote	%
**Gord Lawlor**	**717**	**53.75**
Dean Lovell	617	46.25

=== Stony Plain ===
Mayor

Candidate	Vote	%
**William Choy** (X)	Acclaimed	

=== Strathmore ===
Mayor

Candidate	Vote	%
**Pat Fule** (X)	**1,747**	**50.45**
Jason Hollingsworth	1,716	49.55

=== Sundre ===
Mayor

Candidate	Vote	%

Council

Candidate	Vote	%

=== Swan Hills ===
Mayor

Candidate	Vote	%

Council

Candidate	Vote	%

=== Sylvan Lake ===
Mayor

Candidate	Vote	%
**Megan Hanson** (X)	**2,184**	**67.06**
Dorian Larsen	1,073	32.94

=== Taber ===
Mayor

Candidate	Vote	%
**Andrew Prokop** (X)	**937**	**54.01**
Alfred Rudd	798	45.99

=== Thorsby ===
Mayor

Candidate	Vote	%

Council

Candidate	Vote	%

=== Three Hills ===
Mayor

Candidate	Vote	%

Council

Candidate	Vote	%

=== Tofield ===
Mayor

Candidate	Vote	%

Council

Candidate	Vote	%

=== Trochu ===
Mayor

Candidate	Vote	%

Council

Candidate	Vote	%

=== Two Hills ===
Mayor

Candidate	Vote	%

Council

Candidate	Vote	%

=== Valleyview ===
Mayor

Candidate	Vote	%

Council

Candidate	Vote	%

=== Vauxhall ===
Mayor

Candidate	Vote	%

Council

Candidate	Vote	%

=== Vegreville ===
Mayor

Candidate	Vote	%
**Tim MacPhee** (X)	Acclaimed	

=== Vermilion ===
Mayor

Candidate	Vote	%

Council

Candidate	Vote	%

=== Viking ===
Mayor

Candidate	Vote	%

Council

Candidate	Vote	%

=== Vulcan ===
Mayor

Candidate	Vote	%

Council

Candidate	Vote	%

=== Wainwright ===
Mayor

Candidate	Vote	%
**Bruce Pugh** (X)	**1,152**	**78.53**
Leo Elrick	315	21.47

=== Wembley ===
Mayor

Candidate	Vote	%

Council

Candidate	Vote	%

=== Whitecourt ===
Mayor

Candidate	Vote	%
**Ray Hilts**	**988**	**55.66**
Derek Schlosser	787	44.34

== Specialized municipalities ==
The following are the municipalities incorporated as specialized municipalities in Alberta that did vote in the 2025 Alberta municipal election. Incumbents are marked by an X.

=== Lac La Biche County ===
Mayor

Candidate	Vote	%
Paul Reutov (X)	1,393	45.49
Charlyn Moore	861	28.12
George L'Heureux	416	13.59
Peter John Mahowich	392	12.80

=== Mackenzie County ===
Mackenzie County Council elects a reeve from amongst its members on an annual basis.

=== Municipality of Crowsnest Pass ===
Mayor

Candidate	Vote	%
Pat Rypien	1,515	76.28
Glen Girhiny	393	19.79
J. Douglas Raines	78	3.93

=== Municipality of Jasper ===
Mayor

Candidate	Vote	%
Richard Ireland (X)	Acclaimed	

Council

Top six candidates are elected at large

Candidate	Vote	%
Wendy Hall (X)	701	52
Laurie Rodger	695	52
Ralph Melnyk (X)	657	49
Danny Frechette	617	46
Kable Kongsrud	595	44
Kathleen Waxer (X)	541	40
Helen Kelleher-Empey (X)	520	39
Shawnee Janes Willson	491	37
Gilean Thomas	480	36
Jason STockfish	475	35
Ashley Kliewer	357	27
Stephen Brake	282	21
Paco Artiaga	241	18
Yves Marchand	130	10
Neal Meints	125	9
Theodore Turnbull	72	5
Adam Hvisc	36	3

=== Regional Municipality of Wood Buffalo ===
Mayor

Candidate	Vote	%
Sandy Bowman (X)	9,843	94.75
Zulkifl Mujahid	545	5.25

Council

In multi-member wards, the percentages shown are percentages of votes cast, not percentages of voters who voted.

Candidate	Vote	%
Ward 1 Top six candidates are elected
Donald Scott	4,346	9.24
Luana Bussieres	2,993	6.36
Lance Bussieres (X)	2,943	6.26
Jennifer Vardy	2,885	6.13
Ty Brandt	2,838	6.03
Mike Allen	2,379	5.06
Rene Wells	2,177	4.63
Allan Grandison (X)	2,174	4.62
Funky Banjoko (X)	2,095	4.45
Joe MacNeil	1,859	3.95
Dan Tulk	1,849	3.93
Michael Ferrara	1,721	3.66
Verna Murphy	1,667	3.54
Mila Byron	1,514	3.22
Adam Bugden	1,433	3.05
Koryn Dyer	1,363	2.90
Darrel Chisholm	1,319	2.80
Tiffany Bennett	1,311	2.79
Ij Uche-Ezeala	1,216	2.59
Scott Wilson	944	2.01
Christine Kindopp	928	1.97
Irfan Bangash	892	1.90
Jared Sabovitch	865	1.84
Deborah Moses	716	1.52
KC Hutchins	670	1.42
Wes Harris	579	1.23
T.J. Carabeo	462	0.98
Nathalie Lefebvre	401	0.85
Clyde Alexander Phillips	326	0.69
Yvette Desmarais	168	0.36
Ward 2 Top two candidates are elected
Greg (Cowboy) Marcel	120	25.32
Kendrick Cardinal (X)	93	19.62
Claris Voyageur	81	17.09
Ron Quintal	65	13.71
Russell Kaskamin	62	13.08
Kurtis Girard	53	11.18
Ward 3 One to be elected
Stu Wigle (X)	184	56.79
Sarah Hollands	140	43.21
Ward 4 One to be elected
Kyle Vandecasteyen	164	66.94
Bob Galbraith	81	33.06

=== Strathcona County ===
Mayor

Candidate	Vote	%
Rod Frank (X)	15,753	76.90
Benjamin Biel	4,732	23.10

Council

Candidate	Vote	%
Ward 1
Robert Parks (X)	1,856	63.67
Dean Kakoschke	1,059	36.33
Ward 2
Mike Derbyshire	2,334	64.44
Tracey Giroux	873	24.10
Kathy Flett	415	11.46
Ward 3
Lorne Harvey (X)	2,437	67.02
Alan Dunn	1,199	32.98
Ward 4
Bill Tonita (X)	1,777	67.39
Krystal Hampel	860	32.61
Ward 5
Aaron C. Nelson (X)	Acclaimed	
Ward 6
Corey-Ann Hartwick (X)	978	52.30
Michael Huisman	738	39.47
Brad Bell	154	8.24
Ward 7
Glen Lawrence (X)	951	58.49
Colin Reid	675	41.51
Ward 8
Katie Berghofer (X)	2,174	73.42
Joseph Ganczar	787	26.58

== Municipal districts ==
=== Athabasca County ===
Athabasca County elects its reeve from among its nine council members.

=== County of Barrhead No. 11 ===
The County of Barrhead No. 11 elects its reeve from among its seven council members.

=== Beaver County ===
Beaver County elects its reeve from among its five council members.

=== Big Lakes County ===
Big Lakes County elects its reeve from among its nine council members.

=== Municipal District of Bonnyville No. 87 ===
Reeve

Candidate	Vote	%
Barry Kalinski (X)	1,662	50.49
Greg Sawchuk	1,123	34.11
Darcy Skarsen	507	15.40

=== Brazeau County ===
Reeve

Candidate	Vote	%
Bart Guyon (X)	1,136	56.97
Pat Vos	858	43.03

=== Camrose County ===
Camrose County elects its reeve from among its seven council members.

=== Clearwater County ===
Clearwater County elects its reeve from among its seven council members.

=== Cypress County ===
Cypress County elects its reeve from among its nine council members.

=== Foothills County ===
Foothills County elects its mayor from among its seven council members.

=== County of Grande Prairie No. 1 ===
The County of Grande Prairie No. 11 elects its mayor from among its nine council members.

=== Municipal District of Greenview No. 16 ===
The Municipal District of Greenview No. 16 elects its reeve from among its nine council members.

=== Kneehill County ===
Kneehill County elects its reeve from among its seven council members.

=== Lac Ste. Anne County ===
Lac Ste. Anne County elects its mayor from among its seven council members.

=== Lacombe County ===
Lacombe County elects its reeve from among its seven council members.

=== Lamont County ===
Lamont County elects its reeve and deputy reeve from among its five council members.

Candidate	Votes	E - Elected, X - Incumbent, A - Acclaimed			
Division (Ward) 1
Gerald Thorowsky (E)	119	Daniel Warawa (X)	91		
Division (Ward) 2
Aaron Wick (A)	Acclaimed				
Division (Ward) 3
John Uganecz (E)	166	Dave Diduck (X)	91		
Division (Ward) 4
Roy Anaka (E, X)	92	Tammy Pickett	57	Brent Matiaszow	44
Division (Ward) 5
Neil Woitas (E, X)	215	Natasha Phair	33		

=== Leduc County ===
Leduc County elects its mayor from among its seven council members.

=== Lethbridge County ===
Lethbridge County elects its reeve from among its seven council members.

=== Mountain View County ===
Mounatain View County elects its reeve from among its seven council members.

=== County of Newell ===
The County of Newell elects its reeve from among its ten council members.

=== Parkland County ===
Mayor

Candidate	Vote	%
Rod Shaigec	3,102	56.47
Allan Gamble (X)	2,391	43.53

=== Ponoka County ===
Ponoka County elects its reeve from among its five council members.

=== Red Deer County ===
Mayor

Candidate	Vote	%
Brent Ramsay	2,216	48.12
Christine Moore	1,437	31.21
Lonny M. Kennett	952	20.67

=== Rocky View County ===
Council

Rocky View County's council elects the reeve from among the seven of themselves after the election.

Candidate	Vote	%
Division 1
Kevin Hanson (X)	831	58.56
Mark Kamachi	588	41.44
Division 2
Don Kochan (X)	583	41.67
Bev Copithorne	440	31.45
Allison Colbourne	270	19.30
David Clark	106	7.58
Division 3
Alison Whiting	681	56.56
Crystal Kissel (X)	443	36.79
Steve Lilly	80	6.64
Division 4
Samanntha Wright (X)	886	61.02
Roc Spence	566	38.98
Division 5
Greg Boehlke (X)	548	63.65
Milt Scott	313	36.35
Division 6
Sunny Samra (X)	967	57.25
Jerry Gautreau	495	29.31
Jas Dhadda	227	13.44
Division 7
Ken Ball	339	26.74
Gerard Lucyshyn	276	21.77
Nick Wiebe	225	17.74
Rolly Ashdown	219	17.27
Ron Wenstrom	209	16.48

=== County of Stettler No. 6 ===
The County of Stettler No. 6 elects its reeve from among its seven council members.

=== County of St. Paul No. 19 ===
Reeve

Candidate	Vote	%
Glen Ockerman (X)	950	39.24
Yvonne Weinmeier	751	31.02
Kevin Wirsta	672	27.76
Reginald Lamothe	48	1.98

=== Sturgeon County ===
Mayor

Candidate	Vote	%
Alanna G. Hnatiw (X)	2,368	58.34
Patrick D. Tighe	1,691	41.66

=== Municipal District of Taber ===
The Municipal District of Taber elects its reeve from among its seven council members.

=== County of Vermilion River ===
The County of Vermilion River elects its reeve from among its seven council members.

=== Westlock County ===
Westlock County elects its reeve from among its seven council members.

=== County of Wetaskiwin No. 10 ===
The County of Wetaskiwin No. 10 elects its reeve from among its seven council members.

=== Wheatland County ===
Wheatland County elects its reeve from among its seven council members.

=== Municipal District of Willow Creek No. 26 ===
The Municipal District of Willow Creek No. 26 elects its reeve from among its seven council members.

=== Yellowhead County ===
Mayor

Candidate	Vote	%
Wade Williams (X)	1,457	62.16
Doug Elzinga	887	37.84
