= Charlottetown City Council =

Governing body of Charlottetown, Canada

Charlottetown City Council Conseil municipal de Charlottetown

Type
- Type: City council

History
- Founded: April 17, 1855; 171 years ago
- New session started: January 13, 2026

Leadership
- Mayor of Charlottetown: Philip Brown, Non-partisan since November 7, 2022

Structure
- Seats: 10 councillors 1 ex officio presiding officer (Mayor)
- Length of term: 4 years
- Authority: Municipal Government Act, 2017

Elections
- Last election: November 7, 2022
- Next election: November 2, 2026

Meeting place
- Council Chambers, Charlottetown City Hall

Website
- www.charlottetown.ca

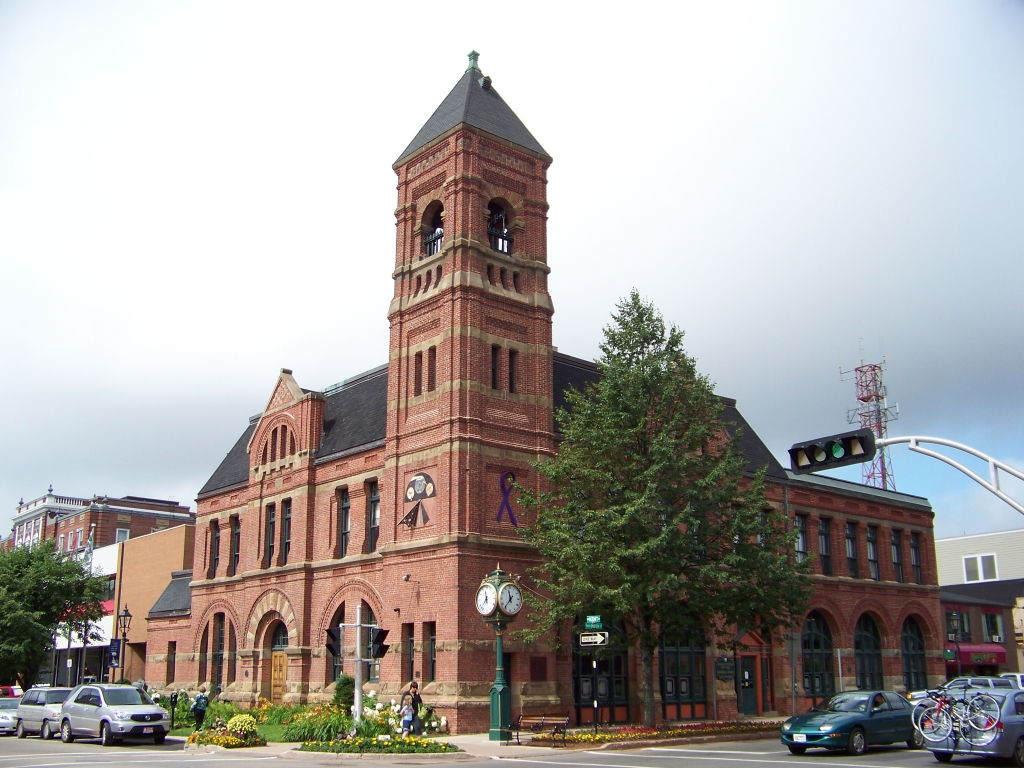
Charlottetown City Hall constructed in 1888.

Charlottetown City Council is the governing body for the city of Charlottetown, the county seat of Queen's County, Prince Edward Island, Canada. The most recent civic election took place in November 7, 2022. City council meets at Charlottetown City Hall.

== Mayor ==
- Philip Brown (2018–present)

== Councillors ==
Ward	Councillor	Year first elected
1 – Queen's Square	Alana Jankov (deputy mayor)	2018
2 – Belvedere	Justin Muttart	2022
3 – Brighton	Norman Beck	2022
4 – Spring Park	Mitchell Tweel	1994
5 – Ellen's Creek	Kevin Ramsay	2014
6 – Mount Edward	Robert Doiron	2014
7 – Beach Grove	John McAleer	2022
8 – Highfield	Trevor MacKinnon	2022
9 – Stonepark	Julie McCabe	2018
10 – Falconwood	Terry Bernard	2000

== See also ==
- List of mayors of Charlottetown
